= Alliance Racing =

British motor racing team

(United Kingdom) Alliance Racing
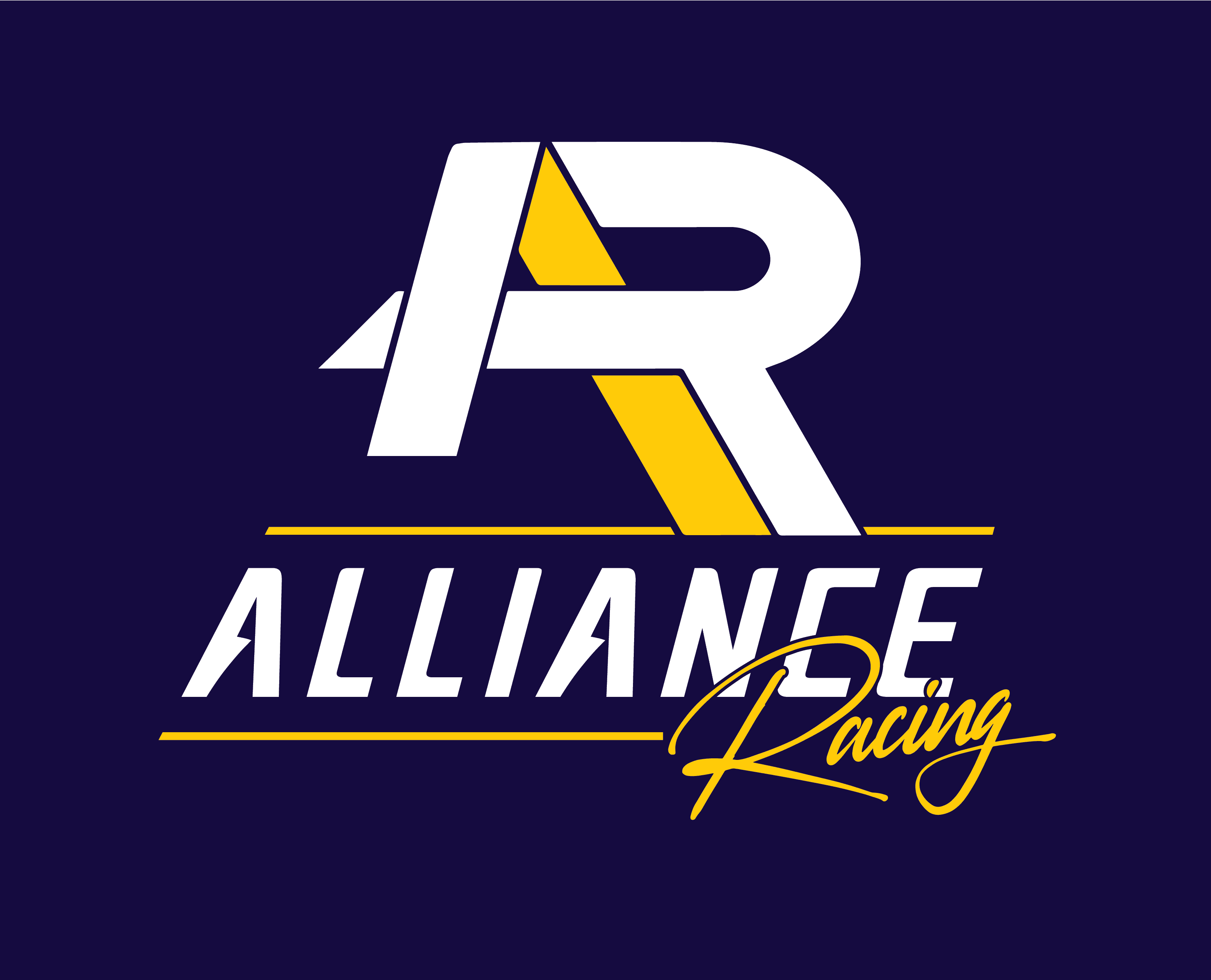
- Founded: 2004 (as Motorbase Performance); 2023 (as Alliance Racing)
- Former names: Motorbase Performance (2004–2023)
- Team principal(s): Pete Osborne; Lewis Selby
- Current series: British Touring Car Championship; Porsche Carrera Cup Great Britain; Porsche Sprint Challenge GB; Mini Challenge UK; Mini Challenge Trophy; F4 Spanish Championship
- Former series: SEAT Cupra Championship; Le Mans Endurance Series; British GT Championship; Blancpain Endurance Series
- Current drivers: British Touring Car Championship; 15. (United Kingdom) Lewis Selby; 18. (United Kingdom) Senna Proctor (part-time); 27. (United Kingdom) Dan Cammish; 77. (United Kingdom) Sam Osborne; 116. (United Kingdom) Ashley Sutton; Porsche Carrera Cup Great Britain; 30. (United Kingdom) Will Jenkins; Porsche Sprint Challenge GB; 99. (United Kingdom) Joe Marshall; Mini Challenge UK; 8. (United Kingdom) Murray Richardson; 11. (United Kingdom) Joe Tanner; 15. (United Kingdom) Cameron Richardson; 88. (United Kingdom) Alfie Garford; Mini Challenge Trophy; 8. (United Kingdom) Ellena Reece; 80. (United Kingdom) Liona Theobald; 111. (United Kingdom) Beanie Reece; 333. (United Kingdom) Lexie Powell; F4 Spanish Championship; 46. (United Kingdom) Nathan Tye; Karting (United Kingdom) Felix Tandy (United Kingdom) Nico Tye
- Noted drivers: (United Kingdom) Paul O'Neill (United Kingdom) Rob Collard (United Kingdom) Mat Jackson (Republic of Ireland) Árón Taylor-Smith (United Kingdom) Jake Hill (United Kingdom) Andrew Jordan (United Kingdom) Rory Butcher (United Kingdom) Tom Chilton (United Kingdom) Ollie Jackson (United Kingdom) Nicolas Hamilton (United Kingdom) Jessica Hawkins (United Kingdom) Daniel Rowbottom
- Teams' Championships: 2016 BTCC Independent Teams; British GT Championship – GT3: 2014
- Drivers' Championships: BTCC 2016 Independent Drivers - Andrew Jordan; Porsche Carrera Cup GB – Pro-Am 1: 2010: Ollie Jackson; British GT Championship – GT3: 2012: Michael Caine & Daniele Perfetti

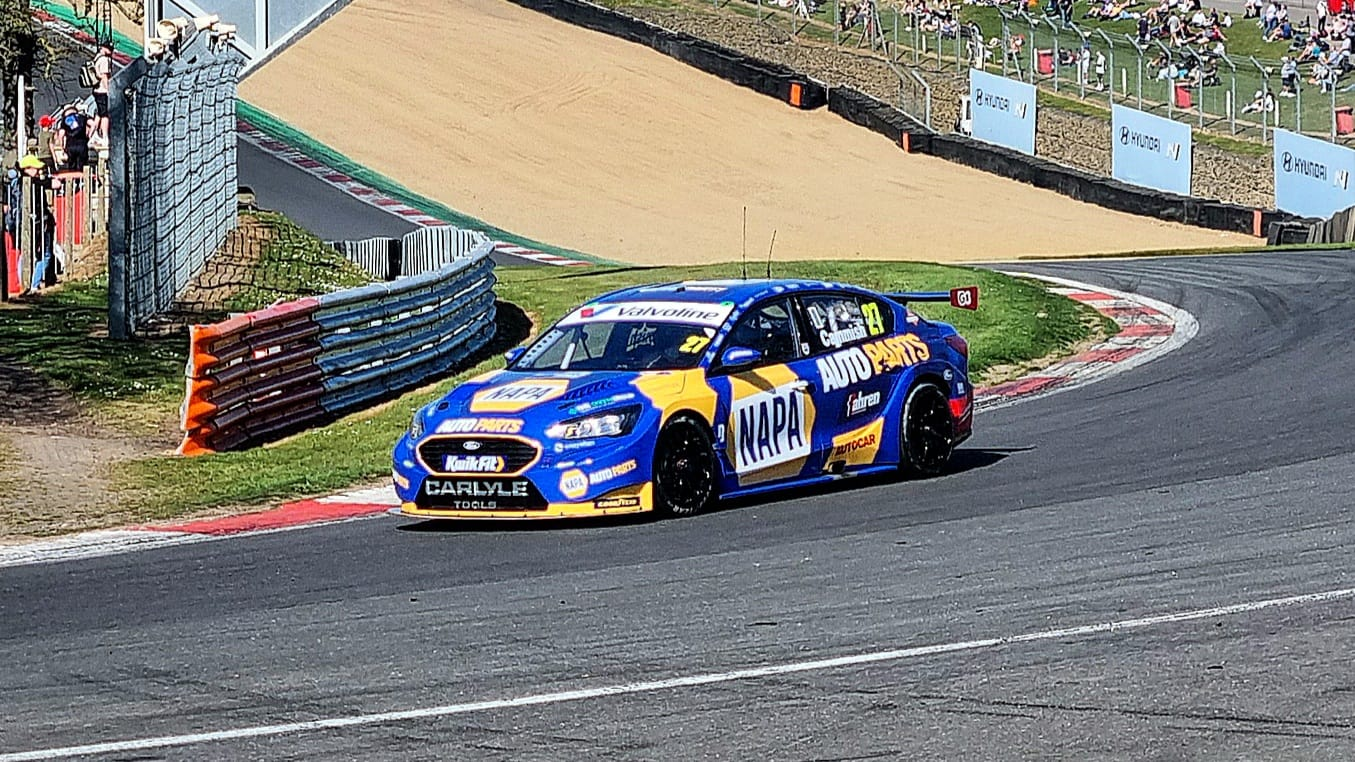
The teams' NAPA-sponsored Ford Focus Titanium BTCC car at Brands Hatch in 2026, driven by Dan Cammish.

Alliance Racing (formerly known as Motorbase Performance) is a British motor racing team, founded in 2004 by former Production Saloon racer David Bartrum. Currently owned by Pete Osborne, they are best known for competing in the British Touring Car Championship under the NAPA Racing UK moniker. The team also competes in the Mini Challenge Championship and has an academy in other series bar the BTCC, backed by Wera Tools.

== Porsche Carrera Cup Great Britain ==
The team started out by contesting the 2004 Porsche Carrera Cup Great Britain, finishing second in the teams championship despite their best-known driver Damien Faulkner only joining mid-season. However, the 2005 season proved difficult with no wins and poor points performance.

2006 saw the team enter both the Pro class and the newly established Pro-Am class. The team's main charge came from the 1992 BTCC champion Tim Harvey, who managed to score 3 wins on his way to second place in that year's championship. In the 2007 Porsche Carrera Cup Great Britain, Steven Kane won more races than anyone else, finishing 3rd overall.

The team took a break form the Carrera Cup in 2008 to focus on their British Touring Car Championship campaign but were back for the 2009 Porsche Carrera Cup Great Britain entering all three classes. Michael Caine was able to take 3 wins for the team during the year on his way to 4th in the championship.

2010 saw Michael Caine lead Motorbase's charge for the title gaining 7 wins along the way. However, he was beaten by 10 points to the title by ex-Motorbase driver Tim Harvey. In 2011, Harvey attempted to defend his title with Motorbase, partnering his rival Caine. However, the championship was won by James Sutton.

In 2011 the partnership of Caine & Harvey helped the team by giving the team two very experienced drivers alongside Kieran Vernon and George Richardson, who stepped up to the Pro-Am 1 category and Steve Parish, who made a return to the Pro- Am 1 category, joined by new Italian team-mate Daniele Perfetti.

Harvey would later claim an outstanding victory for the team in the GB element of the Porsche Carrera World Cup race, racing against over 100 911 GT3 Cup cars from the worldwide Carrera Cup series racing on the daunting 14 mile world famous Nurburgring Nordschleife in Germany.

Later on in the season Caine amoved from the Motorbase Porsche Carrera Cup squad – but rather than stepping away, it was a move that would see him achieve a life-long ambition of joining the ranks of the BTCC.

Keen to fill Caine's recently vacated seat, Team Principal David Bartrum pulled off an ambitious move by drafting in Nick Tandy. In return Tandy produced a debut performance that set a pace of over half a second ahead of the field. The team won three of the four remaining races of the season.

2018 also marked a return to the Porsche Carrera Cup GB grid for Motorbase, following a six-year absence. After initially joining the championship in 2004, David Bartrum's team competed at the very top of the German marque series for seven seasons, securing the Teams’ Championship title with a four-car strong squad in 2010 and amassing an impressive 26 race wins.

Starting the season as a single-car entry with 22-year-old rookie, Dan Vaughan, the team made an early impact, with Vaughan taking three Pro-Am wins and 5 podiums to end his impressive debut season as the Pro-Am runner-up – just 7 points adrift of the title.

A one-off appearance from Frenchman Valentine Hass-Clot at Silverstone at Snetterton, set the championship alight with a blistering performance that saw him charge from 7th to 2nd on the opening lap, with Motorbase collecting the ‘team of the weekend’ award from Porsche.

With the Carrera Cup GB celebrating its 300th race during the season finale weekend at Brands Hatch, David Bartrum commissioned a one-off special livery Porsche 911 Cup Car for the final rounds, drafting in Motorbase and Carrera Cup stalwart Michael Caine to run under the #300. The one-off livery attracted huge attention by both press and fans alike, with the car roof featuring all previous Carrera Cup GB race winners.

The team returned in 2019 running a two car Pro class programme in Porsche Carrera Cup GB for Dan Vaughan and Lewis Plato.

Plato endured a strong run recording eight podiums to secure fourth in the standings while Vaughan claimed sixth in the championship.

=== Porsche Carrera Cup GB results ===
Porsche Carrera Cup Great Britain results
Year	Drivers	Class	Wins	Poles	Fast laps	Points	D.C.
2004	Andy Britnell		0	0	0	176	6th
2004	Damien Faulkner		1	0	3	139	7th
2004	Gary Britnell		0	0	0	109	10th
2005	Andy Britnell		0	0	0	58	11th
2005	Sam Edwards		0	0	0	22	12th
2005	Dave Pinkney		0	0	0	12	15th
2005	Phil Quaife		0	0	0	7	17th
2005	Dave Bartrum		0	0	0	0	NC
2006	Tim Harvey		3	2	1	289	2nd
2006	Michael Caine		0	0	1	183	6th
2006	Phil Quaife	PA	0	0	0	173	7th
2006	Andy Britnell	PA	0	0	0	10	23rd
2007	Steven Kane		7	2	9	322	3rd
2007	Sam Hancock		1	2	1	242	5th
2007	Andy Britnell	PA	0	0	0	159	7th
2007	Gary Britnell	PA	0	0	0	9	20th
2009	Michael Caine		3	0	4	261	4th
2009	Oliver Jackson	PA1	0	0	0	163	7th
2009	Steven Parish	PA2	0	0	0	10	26th
2009	Michael Corridan	PA2	0	0	0	4	30th
2009	George Richardson	PA2	0	0	0	4	32nd
2009	Liam Griffin	PA1	0	0	0	0	NC
2010	Michael Caine		7	8	10	360	2nd
2010	Ollie Jackson	PA1	0	0	0	182	6th
2010	Charles Bateman		0	0	1	179	7th
2010	George Richardson	PA2	0	0	0	28	14th
2010	Steve Parish	PA2	0	0	0	16	20th
2010	Liam Griffin	PA1	0	0	0	16	21st
2011	Michael Caine		0	0	0	84	11th
2011	Kieran Vernon		0	0	0	69	13th
2011	Nick Tandy		3	4	4	68	14th
2011	George Richardson	PA1	0	0	0	68	15th
2011	Tim Harvey		1	0	0	66	16th
2011	Daniele Perfetti	PA1	0	0	0	33	18th
2011	Steve Parish	PA2	0	0	0	6	27th
2018	Michael Caine		0	0	0	4	10th
2018	Valentin Hasse-Clot		0	0	0	2	11th
2018	Dan Vaughan	PA1	3	0	0	107	2nd
2018	Rory Collingbourne	PA1	2	0	0	48	6th
2019	Lewis Plato		0	0	0	94	4th
2019	Dan Vaughan		0	0	0	51	6th
PA1 Pro-Am 1 Class / PA2 Pro-Am 2 Class

== British Touring Car Championship ==
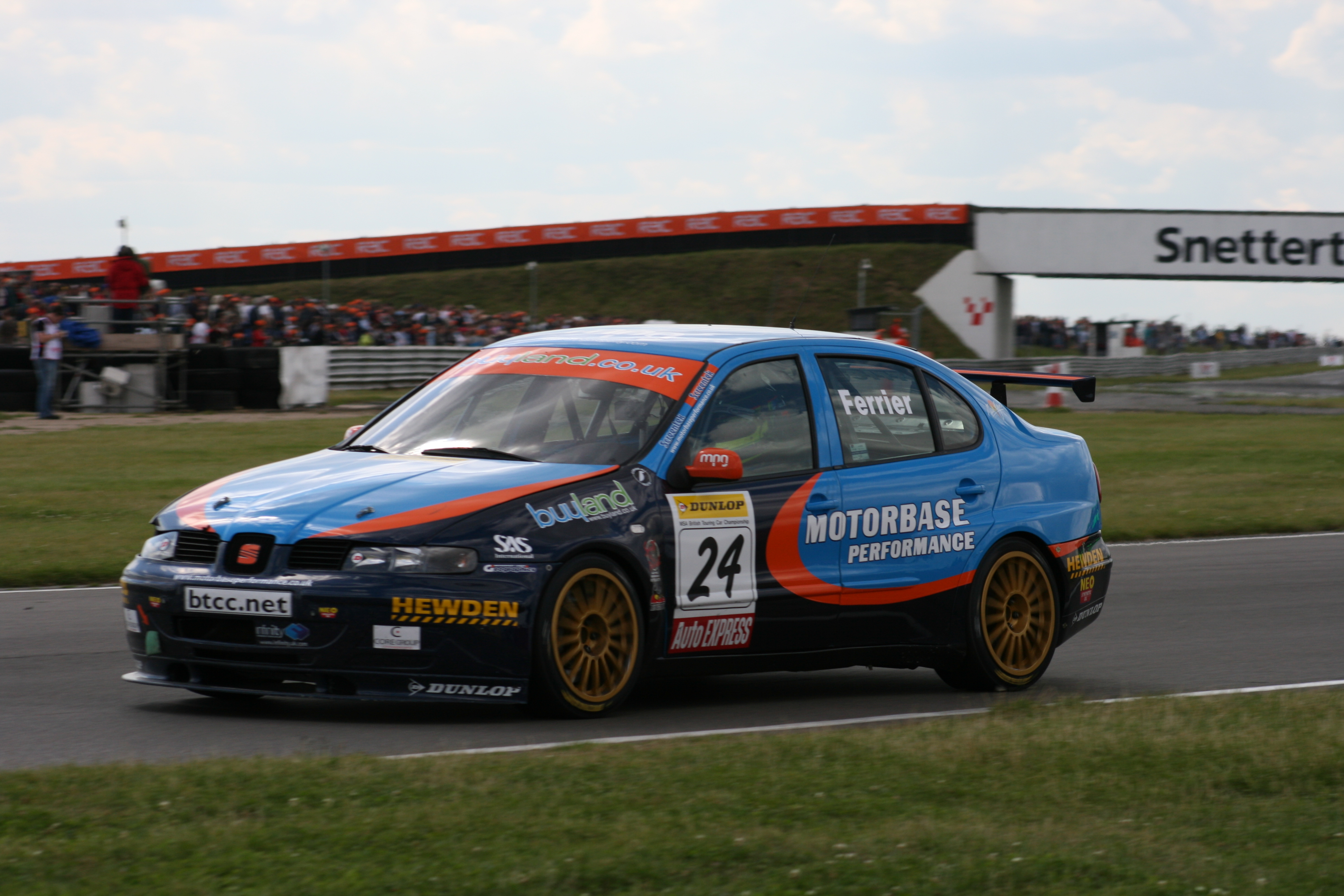
Tom Ferrier driving the Motorbase-run SEAT at the Snetterton round of the 2007 British Touring Car Championship season.

=== Honda Integra (2006) ===
For 2006 they entered the BTCC for the first time, running a BTC Touring spec Honda Integra Type R owned and raced by David Pinkney. He scored a podium at Knockhill, three further top-five finishes, and 13th place overall.

=== SEAT Toledo (2006–2007) ===
For 2007 the team purchased two ex-works, S2000 specification SEAT Toledo cars, debuting one in the final round of the 2006 British Touring Car Championship season, driven by Tom Ferrier. For 2007 they entered Gareth Howell and rookie Matt Allison, showing pace but having regular accidents, skipping the Knockhill meeting after the carnage of Brands Hatch saw both cars written off. Howell left midseason, replaced by Ferrier, while Paul O'Neill joined Allison for the final round.

=== BMW 320si E90 (2008–2010) ===
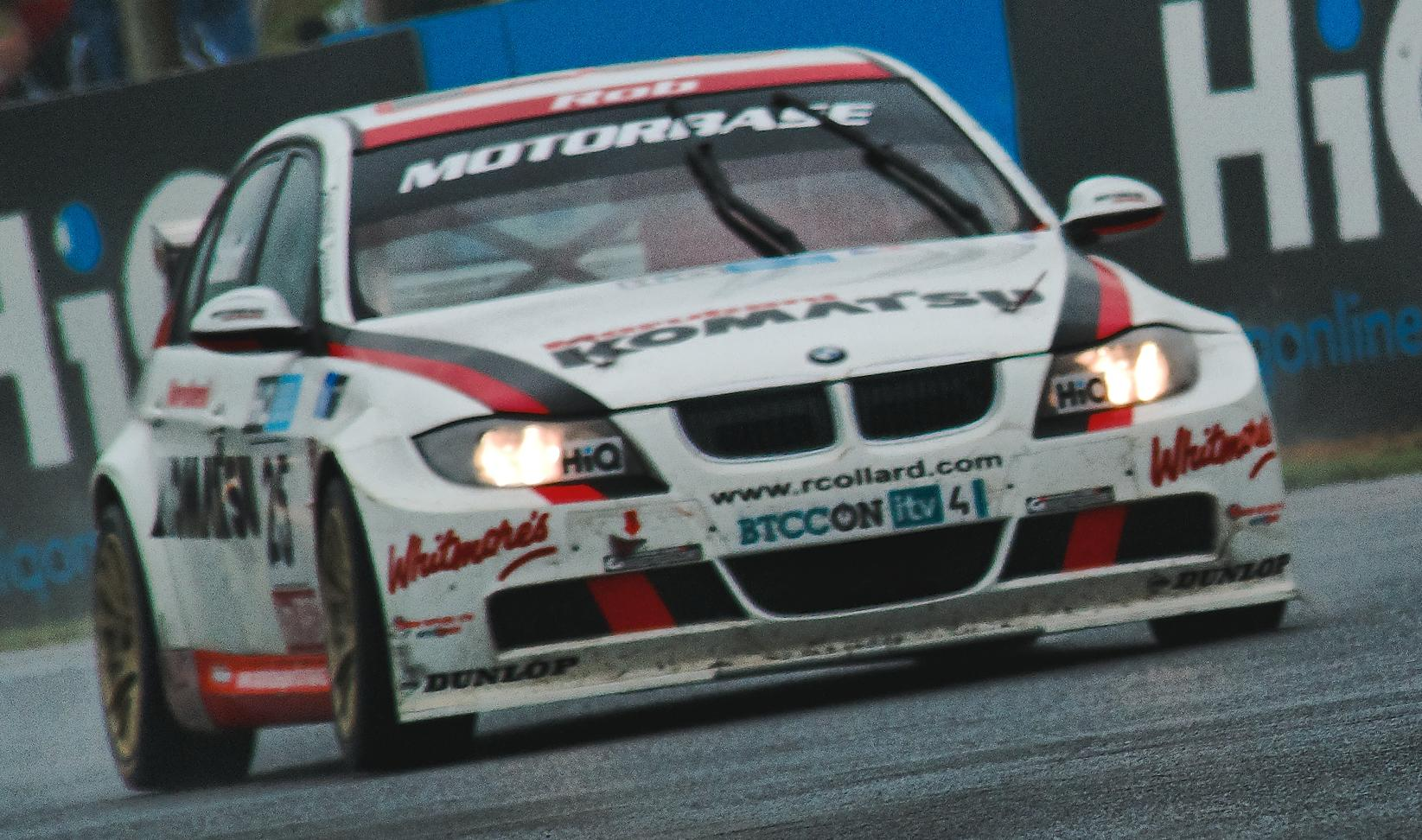
Rob Collard driving at Croft for Motorbase Performance during the 2008 British Touring Car Championship season.

For 2008 the BTCC cars were replaced by factory-specification BMW 320si E90, driven by Steven Kane and Rob Collard. The team entered no other championships for the season. After a slow start to the season (not helped by several wet-dry races which did not suit the rear-wheel-drive BMWs), Collard scored 2 top-5 finishes at Croft in round 5. This was followed by a 2nd-place finish for Kane at Snetterton.

2009 saw Kane replaced by young Scottish driver Jonathan Adam, who had previously won back to back titles in the SEAT Cupra Championship. Due to new sponsorship with Airwaves, the team began running under the Airwaves BMW banner. 2009 proved a successful season, with Collard winning 2 races and the team finishing 4th in the teams championship.

For 2010, Collard moved to West Surrey Racing, while Motorbase brought in Mat Jackson to replace him. Kane returned to the team, replacing Adam. Together, they were able to take 2 wins and 11 podiums, leading to 4th place in the teams championship for two consecutive seasons.

=== Ford Focus ST Mk2 (2011 - 2013) ===
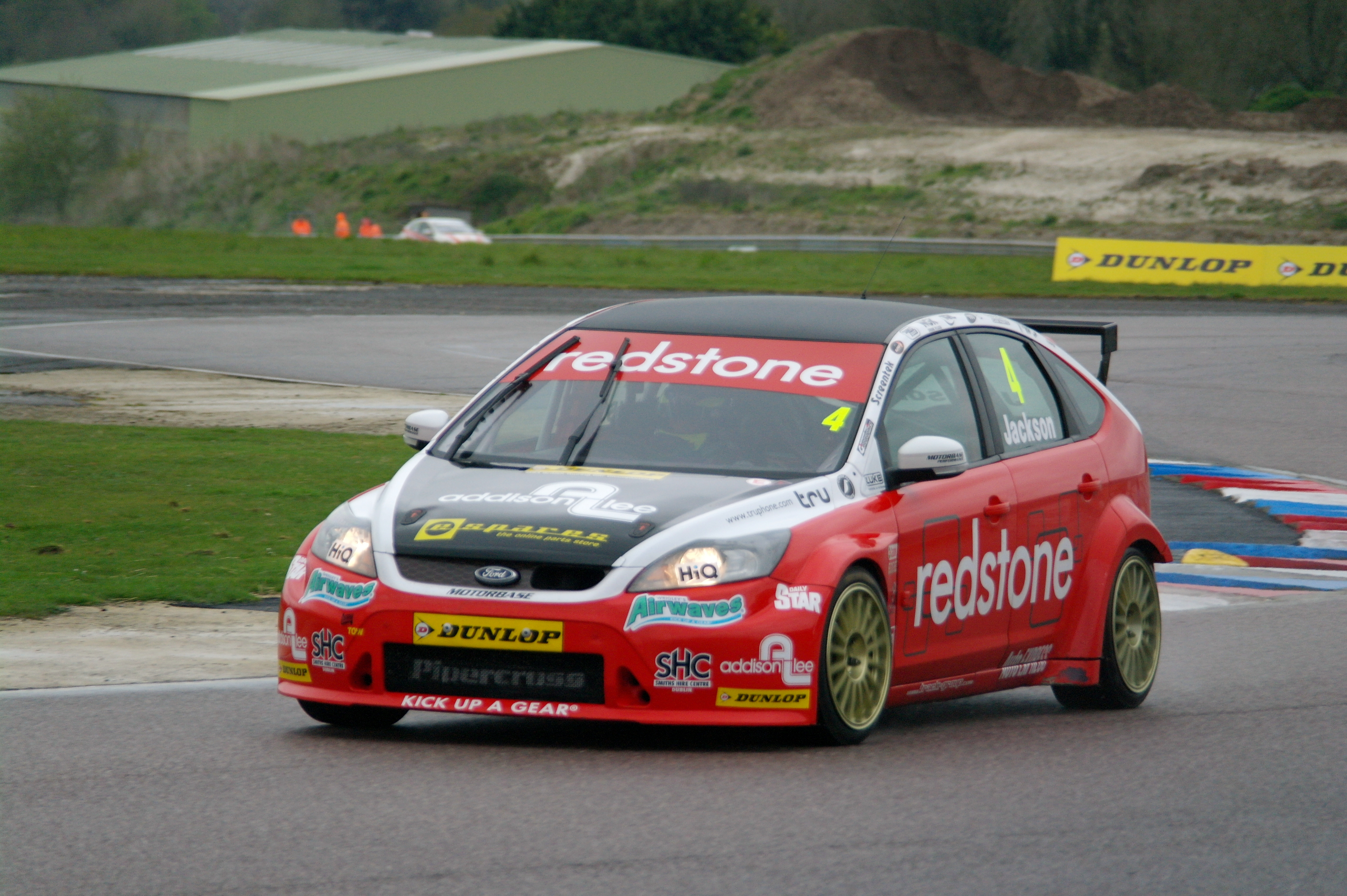
Mat Jackson driving the Motorbase-run Ford Focus ST at the Thruxton round of the 2012 British Touring Car Championship season.

In 2011 the team raced as Airwaves Racing and ran a trio of Ford Focus STs, which were previously run by Team Aon the previous year. Although the chassis was built to the S2000 specification, the team used the turbo charged NGTC Engine. Mat Jackson stayed with the team for a second consecutive season and was joined by rookie Liam Griffin. At the Rockingham and Brands Hatch rounds, the team entered a third car for Porsche Carrera Cup frontrunner Michael Caine. However, he was replaced in the third car at Silverstone by two-time British Touring Car Champion, James Thompson.

In 2012 the team raced under the banner of Redstone Racing, and continued to race with the three Ford Focus STs. Mat Jackson yet again stayed with the team for a third consecutive season. Liam Griffin returned for his second consecutive season with the team. The pair were joined by former Renault Clio Cup racer, Árón Smith. After a fire in Griffin's S2000 Focus meant they were a car short Motorbase built their first car; a NGTC specification global Ford Focus ST Mk.III. This car won its first race at the Silverstone meeting in the hands of Mat Jackson.

=== Ford Focus ST Mk3 (2013 - 2017) ===
For 2013 Airwaves returned as the main sponsor for the team. The team retained Mat Jackson and Árón Smith who both drove new NGTC turbocharged Focus ST MkIII while Liam Griffin continued with the team driving the older S2000 specification turbocharged Focus ST MkII.

David Bartrum pulled off the coup of the year in signing two-times champion Fabrizio Giovanardi as the lead driver for Airwaves Racing in 2014. Another new face in former F2 racer Jack Clarke also looked set to deliver some great results with Clarke piloting the striking lime green livery of Crabbie's Ginger Beer running under the Crabbie's Racing title. Mat Jackson's return to the squad for his fifth season was remarkably only announced at the official championship media day – after a last minute deal was penned that morning.

With BTCC legend Giovanardi and star Jackson spearheading the squad's assault on the 2014 Championship, all eyes were on Motorbase as serious title contenders. Frustratingly, it quickly became apparent that Giovanardi's four-year absence from the Championship had left too big a gap for the Italian to make up and he failed to deliver the expected results. Conversely Jackson enjoyed another superb season, finishing 4th in the overall Championship standings and runner up in the Independents.

The season also marked Motorbase's most successful season to date, taking 4th place in the Overall Teams’ Championship whilst incredibly maintaining a 100% finishing record for the #6 Focus ST – the only car to have completed every lap of the racing season. Jack Clarke's rookie BTCC season built solidly. From a slow start, the Crabbie's-backed racer showed true class during the season and was rewarded with his maiden podium and Independent race win following a stunning drive in the season finale at Brands Hatch.

2014 also marked the end of an era for Motorbase Performance, with Wrigley's Airwaves taking the decision to move away from motorsport and the Motorbase squad after six years of success. One of the most successful partnerships in the BTCC, the farewell was suitably commemorated at the squad's home circuit, Brands Hatch – the circuit where the Airwaves brand had made its debut six years earlier.

The lead up to the 2015 season would prove to be the most challenging yet for Bartrum. With the loss of Wrigley's Airwaves, a new title sponsor was in place for the Kent squad before a last minute change of direction saw them pull out just weeks ahead of the start of the season.

With new signing James Cole already announced and confirmed alongside the returning Mat Jackson and the squad mid-way through a joint Ford EcoBoost development programme with engine builders, Mountune, Team owner David Bartrum had to make the momentous and difficult decision to take a half year sabbatical from the BTCC. With support and agreement from TOCA and the team's technical partners, Motorbase pushed on with the EcoBoost project before making it highly anticipated return to the grid at Snetterton for the second half of the season.

The teams’ return was watched with interest and it soon became apparent that the new EcoBoost engine and chassis improvements had brought a new lease of life to the Focus ST. After a promising start at Snetterton and Knockhill, Mat Jackson was the man of the moment – taking a maiden BTCC qualifying pole for Motorbase at Rockingham – before making it 3 in a row with a repeat performance at Silverstone and Brands Hatch.

In the final three race meetings, Jackson and Motorbase took an unrivalled 4 outright race wins and 4 podium finishes – breaking lap records along the way. Cole also enjoyed his most successful BTCC results in three years – taking a career best 9th-place finish at Silverstone, a day best remembered for Motorbase claiming pole position in all three BTCC races.

2016 would prove to be the best year to date for Motorbase Performance. The team made a huge signing with 2013 BTCC champion Andrew Jordan joining the squad alongside Jackson.

Back for this seventh consecutive season with the team, Mat Jackson was almost untouchable. Taking a joint-top number of race wins (5 outright) for the season, Jackson also led the most laps out of the 32-strong-grid in his #7 Focus ST. Jordan proved to be a welcome addition to the team and settled in well, taking his first win in over two years at Thruxton. With both drivers consistently on form Motorbase took an early lead in the Independent Teams Championship and already had an unassailable lead by the time the BTCC grid left Rockingham.

Heading into the season finale at the squad's local Brands Hatch circuit, both Jackson and Jordan were still in contention for the overall drivers’ title. An action-packed race day delivered high drama for both with a heavy shunt ruling Jordan out of the title race whilst Jackson claimed his fifth outright win of the season – propelling him into 3rd overall – the highest placed Independent Driver and just 16 points off Championship winner, Gordon Shedden.

The 10th year for Motorbase Performance in the BTCC saw the team win both Independent Team and Independent Drivers titles. This season, Mat Jackson and Andrew Jordan were able to score 7 wins, 7 podium finishes, 15 Independent race wins, and 21 Independent podiums driving the mountune Ford Focus STs.

For 2017, Motorbase Performance boss David Bartrum decided the time had come to focus all efforts on the Dunlop MSA British Touring Car Championship.

Soon after, the well-known consumer brand Shredded Wheat was confirmed as title sponsor for a multiple-year campaign and the Kent-based squad unveiled a three-car assault with Mat Jackson at the helm, joined by BTCC regular Martin Depper and rookie Luke Davenport.

With a renewed energy, the squad set off the season all guns blazing but the results failed to materialise with the three Team Shredded Wheat Racing with duo Ford Focus STs struggling against the competition. After a promising weekend at Oulton Park with newcomer Davenport claiming Jack Sears Trophy honours as the top scoring rookie of the weekend, disaster struck at the next meeting in North Yorkshire. During a wet qualifying session at Croft Circuit, 24-year-old Davenport was involved in a season-ending accident and suffered life-threatening injuries. Thankfully, following tremendous care from the TOCA safety team and staff at the James Cook hospital in Middlesbrough, he made a full recovery but a return to racing was off the cards.

Former Motorbase GT racer Rory Butcher was drafted in to replace the stricken driver for the final 4 meetings of the season, with the scot making his BTCC debut at his local circuit, Knockhill and his rousing performance was rewarded with two top ten finishes and the Jack Sears Trophy honours.

The second half of the season proved more fruitful for the Motorbase team, with Jackson taking 7 Independent race wins across the ten race meetings. After a challenging year, Team Shredded Wheat Racing with DUO eventually ended the 2017 BTCC season in 6th place overall in the Teams Championship and 3rd in the Independent Teams’ standings.

=== Ford Focus RS (2018 - 2019) ===
Motorbase secured two front-running drivers for its 2018 BTCC line-up in the shape of Touring Car star Tom Chilton (straight off his WTCC campaign) and Mat Jackson in the Team Shredded Wheat Racing with Gallagher Fords. 2016 BTCC runner-up Sam Tordoff was also added to the squad, making his highly anticipated return to the series after a years’ sabbatical.

The new season also signalled the unveiling of the new Ford Focus RS machine, with the Motorbase outfit bringing the iconic RS badge back to the championship after a 25-year absence. The Sierra Cosworth RS500 dominated the Championship during the late eighties, securing the former Class A title for Robb Gravett back in 1990.

A shock, last minute departure for Jackson just weeks before the start of the season opened the way for BTCC race winner James Cole to return to the Motorbase fold, with the trio set up as one of the strongest squad's on the grid. Lining up against one of the most competitive grids ever seen in the BTCC, the season delivered mixed blessings for the team.

Tordoff's unquestionable pace was rarely rewarded with the deserved results, with a series of unfortunate incidents marring the Yorkshireman's successes. Although, a challenging season overall, the JCT-backed driver remained unmatched in qualifying – ending the season as the highest-placed qualifier over the year – with an average starting position of 6th. Also securing the Ford Focus RS maiden pole position at Rockingham (poignantly, the BTCC's last-ever visit to the circuit) and leading a spectacular Motorbase 1–2 at the following round on the Silverstone National circuit.

Chilton's debut Motorbase season was a huge success. Settling well into the team and the Focus RS, the 13 times-race winner added yet another win to his tally, collecting a maiden victory for the Ford Focus RS at Knockhill along with 5 podiums, eventually ending the season 3rd in the Overall Championship standings, and as Runner-up in the Independent Standings.

Numerous top ten finishes for Cole delivered a steady stream of points and the Team Shredded Wheat Racing with Gallagher squad finished 4th overall in the Teams Standings – as the highest-placed Independent Team – also claiming 2nd in the Independent Teams’ championship with the newly developed Ford Focus RS marking a solid debut season with 2 Independent race wins and 11 podiums.

Motorbase continued to field three Ford Focus RS machines in 2019 but with a changed driver line-up.

Chilton was joined by former AmDTuning.com driver Ollie Jackson in a move that saw him return to Motorbase, having driven for the squad previously in the Porsche Carrera Cup UK.

Nicolas Hamilton, half brother of six-time Formula 1 world champion Lewis Hamilton, piloted the third car under the ROKiT Racing banner. Hamilton contested eight rounds before sponsorship issues saw him vacate the seat for the final two rounds at Silverstone and Brands Hatch GP, where Michael Caine took over the car, now featuring backing from Pro Alloy.

Chilton scored double podiums at the Brands Hatch opener before claiming a third and the team's only outright win of the year at Croft. He finished 10th in the standings after snaring his fifth podium at the Brands Hatch finale.

Jackson scored seven top 10 finishes, with a best of fourth at Snetterton, on his way to 19th in the championship.

=== Ford Focus ST Mk4 (2020 - 2025) ===
For 2020, the team embarked on a huge project in developing a brand new car using the latest Ford Focus ST Mk4 chassis.

This teams’ biggest undertaking in terms of car design saw the team use CAD for the first time to construct its new contender.

Three new cars were built for the season driven by the returning Rory Butcher, Ollie Jackson and Andy Neate, who made his return to the BTCC full-time after an eight-year sabbatical.

The car made its debut in testing in February/March but did not race until August due to the COVID-19 pandemic delaying the start of the BTCC season. It proved to be an instant success propelling Butcher to two podium finishes in the opening meeting at Donington Park. Butcher would go on to take the next two pole positions in qualifying at Brands Hatch GP and Oulton Park.

Jackson also shone in the Focus scoring a second career BTCC podium with a third at Brands Hatch. Oulton Park saw Butcher claim another two podiums, including the car's maiden win in Race 1 at the Cheshire circuit.

Butcher went on to win the final race at Knockhill and take third in the final race at the following meeting in Thruxton, to put him firmly in the title race.

Silverstone however proved a bittersweet meeting for the team as Butcher, who claimed third in Race 1, was spun by Ash Sutton in Race 2 before suffering a huge airborne crash in Race 3, almost writing off the car.

In the same race as the Butcher crash, team-mate Jackson went on to record a famous win his first in the BTCC.

Jackson would go on to accrue another win at Snetterton while Butcher scored the team's fifth win in the final race of the season at Brands Hatch Indy.

Motorbase scored 11 podiums in total to claim fourth in the team's championship and second in the independent teams’ title race. Butcher secured fifth in the championship with Jackson in 12th.

Neate scored three points on his way to 23rd in the championship.

==== 2022 Season ====
===== Drivers Championship =====
2nd - Sutton

8th - Cammish

22nd - Jackson

25th - Osborne

===== Teams Championship =====
1st - NAPA Racing UK

===== Manufacturers Championship =====
2nd - Ford / Motorbase Performance

===== Jack Sears Trophy =====
4th - Osborne

==== 2023 Season ====
===== Drivers Championship =====
1st - Sutton

6th - Cammish

7th - Rowbottom

19th - Osborne

===== Teams Championship =====
1st - NAPA Racing UK

===== Manufacturers Championship =====
2nd - Alliance Racing / Ford

===== Jack Sears Trophy =====
4th - Osborne

==== 2024 Season ====
===== Drivers Championship =====
3rd - Sutton

5th - Cammish

11th - Rowbottom

15th - Osborne

===== Teams Championship =====
1st - NAPA Racing UK

===== Manufacturers Championship =====
1st- Alliance Racing / Ford

===== Jack Sears Trophy =====
2nd - Osborne

==== 2025 Season ====
===== Drivers Championship =====
2nd - Sutton

3rd - Cammish

5th - Rowbottom

16th - Osborne

===== Teams Championship =====
1st - NAPA Racing UK

===== Manufacturers Championship =====
2nd - Alliance Racing / Ford

===== Jack Sears Trophy =====
3rd - Osborne

=== Ford Focus Titanium (2026 -present) ===
==== 2026 Season ====
===== Drivers Championship =====
1st - Sutton

3rd - Cammish

17th - Osborne

19th - Selby

===== Teams Championship =====
1st - NAPA Racing UK

===== Manufacturers Championship =====
1st - Alliance Racing / Ford

===== Jack Sears Trophy =====
2nd - Selby

3rd - Osborne

=== BTCC results ===
Year	Name	Car	No.	Driver	Races	Wins	Poles	F/Laps	Podiums	Points	DC	CC Pts	CC
2006	Motorbase Performance	SEAT Toledo Cupra	23	(United Kingdom) Tom Ferrier	3	0	0	0	0	7	19th	74	6th
2006	Motorbase Performance	Honda Integra Type R	55	(United Kingdom) Dave Pinkney	30	0	0	1	1	56	13th	74	6th
2007	Motorbase Performance	SEAT Toledo Cupra	23	(United Kingdom) Matt Allison	27	0	0	0	0	29	12th	47	8th
2007	Motorbase Performance	SEAT Toledo Cupra	24	(United Kingdom) Tom Ferrier	7	0	0	0	0	2	22nd	47	8th
2007	Motorbase Performance	SEAT Toledo Cupra	25	(United Kingdom) Gareth Howell	14	0	0	0	0	16	14th	47	8th
2007	Motorbase Performance	SEAT Toledo Cupra	29	(United Kingdom) Paul O'Neill	3	0	0	0	0	0	33rd	47	8th
2008	Motorbase Performance	BMW 320si E90	24	(United Kingdom) Steven Kane	29	0	0	2	3	86	11th	173	6th
2008	Motorbase Performance	BMW 320si E90	25	(United Kingdom) Rob Collard	29	0	0	0	2	84	12th	173	6th
2009	Airwaves BMW	BMW 320si E90	11	(United Kingdom) Rob Collard	30	2	0	2	3	145	6th	255	4th
2009	Airwaves BMW	BMW 320si E90	12	(United Kingdom) Jonny Adam	30	0	0	1	2	116	8th	255	4th
2010	Airwaves BMW	BMW 320si E90	5	(United Kingdom) Mat Jackson	30	1	0	0	6	169	6th	320	4th
2010	Airwaves BMW	BMW 320si E90	11	(United Kingdom) Steven Kane	30	1	0	0	7	155	7th	320	4th
2010	Airwaves BMW	BMW 320si E90	12	(United Kingdom) Ben Collins	3	0	0	0	0	0	26th	320	4th
2011	Airwaves Racing	Ford Focus ST Mk.II	6	(United Kingdom) Michael Caine	27	0	0	0	0	1	23rd	183	5th
2011	Airwaves Racing	Ford Focus ST Mk.II	6	(United Kingdom) James Thompson	3	0	0	1	0	1	25th	183	5th
2011	Airwaves Racing	Ford Focus ST Mk.II	7	(United Kingdom) Mat Jackson	30	4	0	7	10	191	4th	183	5th
2011	Airwaves Racing	Ford Focus ST Mk.II	66	(United Kingdom) Liam Griffin	30	0	0	0	0	2	21st	183	5th
2012	Redstone Racing	Ford Focus ST Mk.III	4	(United Kingdom) Mat Jackson	15	3	3	0	6	274	7th	502	4th
2012	Redstone Racing	Ford Focus ST Mk.II	4	(United Kingdom) Mat Jackson	15	3	3	0	6	274	7th	502	4th
2012	Redstone Racing	Ford Focus ST Mk.II	5	(Republic of Ireland) Árón Smith	30	1	0	0	2	204	8th	502	4th
2012	Redstone Racing	Ford Focus ST Mk.II	6	(United Kingdom) Liam Griffin	21	0	0	0	0	37	21st	502	4th
2013	Airwaves Racing	Ford Focus Mk.III	6	(United Kingdom) Tom Onslow-Cole (Note: Onslow-Cole competed Rounds 1 to 7 with Team HARD and Rounds 8 to 10 with Motorbase Performance.)	9	0	0	0	0	152	12th	442	5th
2013	Airwaves Racing	Ford Focus Mk.III	7	(United Kingdom) Mat Jackson	30	0	0	0	4	225	8th	442	5th
2013	Airwaves Racing	Ford Focus Mk.III	8	(Republic of Ireland) Árón Smith	30	1	0	0	4	201	9th	442	5th
2013	Addison Lee Racing	Ford Focus Mk.III	4	(United Kingdom) Michael Caine	2	0	0	0	0	8	22nd	15	14th
2013	Addison Lee Racing	Ford Focus Mk.II	9	(United Kingdom) Jake Hill (Note: Hill competed in Round 5 with Motorbase Performance and Round 10 with Rob Austin Racing.)	3	0	0	0	0	8	23rd	15	14th
2013	Addison Lee Racing	Ford Focus Mk.II	66	(United Kingdom) Liam Griffin	25	0	0	0	0	6	25th	15	14th
2014	Airwaves Racing	Ford Focus ST	6	(United Kingdom) Mat Jackson	30	2	0	0	5	316	4th	465	4th
2014	Airwaves Racing	Ford Focus ST	7	(Italy) Fabrizio Giovanardi	30	0	0	0	1	138	13th	465	4th
2014	Crabbie's Racing	Ford Focus ST	44	(United Kingdom) Jack Clarke	30	0	0	0	1	50	19th	57	13th
2015	Motorbase Performance	Ford Focus ST	4	(United Kingdom) Mat Jackson	15	4	3	4	8	200	12th	223	7th
2015	Motorbase Performance	Ford Focus ST	44	(United Kingdom) James Cole	15	0	0	0	0	32	19th	223	7th
2016	Motorbase Performance	Ford Focus ST	7	(United Kingdom) Mat Jackson	30	5	0	1	9	292	3rd	538	3rd
2016	Motorbase Performance	Ford Focus ST	77	(United Kingdom) Andrew Jordan	30	2	0	0	5	255	8th	538	3rd
2017	Team Shredded Wheat Racing with DUO	Ford Focus ST	3	(United Kingdom) Mat Jackson	30	1	0	0	3	210	8th	235	6th
2017	Team Shredded Wheat Racing with DUO	Ford Focus ST	6	(United Kingdom) Rory Butcher	15	0	0	0	0	20	29th	235	6th
2017	Team Shredded Wheat Racing with DUO	Ford Focus ST	30	(United Kingdom) Martin Depper	29	0	0	0	0	22	28th	235	6th
2017	Team Shredded Wheat Racing with DUO	Ford Focus ST	300	(United Kingdom) Luke Davenport	12	0	0	0	0	6	32nd	235	6th
2018	Team Shredded Wheat Racing with Gallagher	Ford Focus ST	3	(United Kingdom) Tom Chilton	30	1	0	2	6	266	3rd	318	4th
2018	Team Shredded Wheat Racing with Gallagher	Ford Focus ST	20	(United Kingdom) James Cole	30	0	0	0	0	67	21st	318	4th
2018	Team GardX Racing with Motorbase	Ford Focus ST	600	(United Kingdom) Sam Tordoff	30	1	0	1	2	202	11th	198	11th
2019	Team Shredded Wheat Racing with Gallagher	Ford Focus RS	3	(United Kingdom) Tom Chilton	30	1	0	0	5	200	10th	279	7th
2019	Team Shredded Wheat Racing with Gallagher	Ford Focus RS	48	(United Kingdom) Ollie Jackson	30	0	0	0	0	81	19th	279	7th
2019	ROKiT Racing with Motorbase	Ford Focus RS	28	(United Kingdom) Nicolas Hamilton	24	0	0	0	0	0	32nd	0	20th
2019	Motorbase Performance	Ford Focus RS	44	(United Kingdom) Michael Caine	6	0	0	0	0	16	25th	16	17th
2020	Motorbase Performance	Ford Focus ST Mk.IV	6	(United Kingdom) Rory Butcher	27	3	1	2	8	286	5th	426	4th
2020	Motorbase Performance	Ford Focus ST Mk.IV	44	(United Kingdom) Andy Neate	27	0	0	0	0	3	25th	426	4th
2020	Motorbase Performance	Ford Focus ST Mk.IV	48	(United Kingdom) Ollie Jackson	27	2	0	0	3	152	12th	426	4th
2021	Racing with Wera & Photon Group	Ford Focus ST	4	(United Kingdom) Sam Osborne	30	0	0	0	0	16	23rd	28	12th
2021	Racing with Wera & Photon Group	Ford Focus ST	20	(United Kingdom) Paul Rivett	6	0	0	0	0	0	31st	28	12th
2021	Racing with Wera & Photon Group	Ford Focus ST	21	(United Kingdom) Jessica Hawkins	3	0	0	0	0	0	33rd	28	12th
2021	Racing with Wera & Photon Group	Ford Focus ST	44	(United Kingdom) Andy Neate	16	0	0	0	0	0	30th	28	12th
2021	MB Motorsport accelerated by Blue Square	Ford Focus ST	24	(United Kingdom) Jake Hill	30	2	0	2	9	295	5th	384	6th
2021	MB Motorsport accelerated by Blue Square	Ford Focus ST	48	(United Kingdom) Ollie Jackson	30	0	0	0	1	77	18th	384	6th
2022	NAPA Racing UK	Ford Focus ST	1	(United Kingdom) Ashley Sutton	30	3	0	4	12	382	2nd	582	1st
2022	NAPA Racing UK	Ford Focus ST	9	(United Kingdom) Dan Cammish	30	1	1	0	4	207	8th	582	1st
2022	Apec Racing with Beavis Morgan	Ford Focus ST	48	(United Kingdom) Ollie Jackson	30	0	0	0	0	33	22nd	40	13th
2022	Apec Racing with Beavis Morgan	Ford Focus ST	77	(United Kingdom) Sam Osborne	30	0	0	0	0	1	25th	40	13th
2023	NAPA Racing UK	Ford Focus ST	27	(United Kingdom) Dan Cammish	27	3	2	1	6	253	6th	713	1st
2023	NAPA Racing UK	Ford Focus ST	32	(United Kingdom) Daniel Rowbottom	29	1	1	0	5	226	7th	713	1st
2023	NAPA Racing UK	Ford Focus ST	77	(United Kingdom) Sam Osborne	30	0	0	0	1	65	19th	713	1st
2023	NAPA Racing UK	Ford Focus ST	116	(United Kingdom) Ashley Sutton	30	12	6	12	20	446	1st	713	1st
2024	NAPA Racing UK	Ford Focus ST	1	(United Kingdom) Ashley Sutton	30	3	0	6	14	365	3rd	724	1st
2024	NAPA Racing UK	Ford Focus ST	27	(United Kingdom) Dan Cammish	30	1	0	3	9	346	5th	724	1st
2024	NAPA Racing UK	Ford Focus ST	32	(United Kingdom) Daniel Rowbottom	30	0	0	1	2	186	11th	724	1st
2024	NAPA Racing UK	Ford Focus ST	77	(United Kingdom) Sam Osborne	29	0	0	0	0	93	15th	724	1st
2025	NAPA Racing UK	Ford Focus ST	27	(United Kingdom) Dan Cammish	30	3	2	2	10	307	3rd	775	1st
2025	NAPA Racing UK	Ford Focus ST	32	(United Kingdom) Daniel Rowbottom	30	3	0	1	8	277	5th	775	1st
2025	NAPA Racing UK	Ford Focus ST	77	(United Kingdom) Sam Osborne	29	1	0	0	1	108	16th	775	1st
2025	NAPA Racing UK	Ford Focus ST	116	(United Kingdom) Ashley Sutton	30	5	1	7	17	428	2nd	775	1st
2026	NAPA Racing UK	Ford Focus Titanium Saloon	15	(United Kingdom) Lewis Selby	30	0	0	0	0	46	19th	766	1st
2026	NAPA Racing UK	Ford Focus Titanium Saloon	18	(United Kingdom) Senna Proctor	3	0	0	0	0	31	21st	766	1st
2026	NAPA Racing UK	Ford Focus Titanium Saloon	27	(United Kingdom) Dan Cammish	30	3	1	1	8	372	3rd	766	1st
2026	NAPA Racing UK	Ford Focus Titanium Saloon	77	(United Kingdom) Sam Osborne	25	0	0	0	0	76	17th	766	1st
2026	NAPA Racing UK	Ford Focus Titanium Saloon	116	(United Kingdom) Ashley Sutton	30	9	1	13	21	516	1st	766	1st

== Other Championships/Series ==
In 2005 they contested the SEAT Cupra Championship and the GT3 class of the British GT Championship, running an assortment of drivers including Steven Kane, Tim Harvey and David Pinkney.

They also raced in British GTs in 2006 and ventured outside the UK for the first time, in selected rounds of the Le Mans Endurance Series.

A return to the British GT Championship in 2012 would prove a prudent move for team, as the Motorbase pairing of Michael Caine and Daniele Perfetti in the Porsche 997 GT3 produced some stunning race results lined up against strong competition (including ex-Motorbase drivers Tim Harvey and Jonny Adam) on the GT grid.

The title showdown came down to the last start/finish line of the season with five cars competing for the overall title heading into the finale at Donington Park. A dramatic end to the season saw the Motorbase team finish the final two hour endurance race in fourth place, clinching the British GT Title in only its first season back competing in the Championship.

In 2013 Michael Caine was once more welcomed back behind the wheel of the #1 Porsche 911 GT3R to defend his British GT Championship title; partnered by Porsche Carrera Cup GB Champion Ahmad Al Harthy under the new team name Oman Air Motorbase for the 2013 season.

This pair received a 75 kg weight penalty and the team finished 5th in the overall championship.

The squad expanded its GT programme into Europe in 2014 with parallel programmes in the Blancpain Endurance Series and British GT Championship.

The partnership of Al Harthy and Caine returned for a second British GT campaign with former BTCC and Porsche Carrera Cup racer Stephen Jelley joining them for the squad's maiden Blancpain run. Meanwhile, young Scotsman Rory Butcher joined forces with veteran sports car racer John Hartshorne in the second Vantage GT3. Hartshorne's place in the squad was short-lived however, with former BTCC racer Liam Griffin joining Butcher in the Vantage at Rockingham for the remainder of the season.

The move to the Aston Martin marque paid dividends for Motorbase in the British GT, with Bartrum's squad reclaiming the overall Teams Championship title during a thrilling Donington Park finale. A historic result for the team as the first ever Omani-licensed entry and Championship win for the Oman Nation. An incredible final performance from Al Harthy and Caine saw the duo end the season as Vice Champions – narrowly missing out on the overall drivers’ honours.

A new driver line-up beckoned for the GT squad in 2015 with 23-year-old Daniel Lloyd partnering Ahmad Al Harthy in the British GT Championship.

Also returning for a full season effort was the duo of Rory Butcher and Liam Griffin in the second Aston Martin.

A familiar face also made a one-off appearance in the British GT opening round with Mat Jackson pairing up with Phil Dryburgh for the opening two races. A start to the season with an opening race win for Butcher and Griffin set the scene for the season and the pair enjoyed a year in the #8 Aston; surprising many by taking two race wins, they ended the season in fourth place overall.

A change in driver classification had a massive impact on Al Harthy and Lloyd with the pair slotted into the new GT3 Silver Cup Class. With new BOP regulations also coming into play, the duos’ season was placed on the back foot immediately. Despite the challenges facing them, Al Harthy and Lloyd enjoyed success with a well-earned podium finish at Rockingham on their way to claiming the Silver Cup title at the end of the season.

With a new look Blancpain Endurance Series line-up confirmed in Ahmad Al Harthy, Daniel Lloyd and Aston Martin works driver and former Motorbase BTCC driver Jonny Adam, David Bartrum's squad was set for its second European campaign. With a year of experience and knowledge of the Aston Martin V12 Vantage GT3, the squad came close to a podium finish at the blue-riband Total 24 hours of Spa. Pitted against the world's leading GT3 teams in the Pro Class, the Wrotham-based team struggled in the first half of the season, before a move to Pro-Am class was rewarded with a top ten finish for Ahmad Al Harthy, Rory Butcher and Stefan Mücke during the last race of the season on the world-famous Nürburgring.

2015 ended with the GT squad taking a pole position and podium on its maiden appearance in the Gulf 12 hours race on the stunning Yas Marina Grand Prix circuit in December. The only Aston Martin on the grid, the Motorbase car piloted by Al Harthy and Aston Martin works drivers Jonny Adam and Darren Turner raced against top International talent to take third place overall.

2016 saw a reshuffle in the GT squad saw the return of Al Harthy. The Oman racer was this time joined by Motorbase favourite and Aston Martin works driver Jonny Adam and newcomer Devon Modell – all focussed on refining on the previous season's performances in Europe competing in the Blancpain Endurance Cup. Motorbase also returned to the British GT grid with sportscar veteran Phil Dryburgh behind the wheel of the #8 Vantage GT3, partnered by young Scot, Ross Wylie.

The European campaign started well for the Blancpain squad with Modell, Adam and Al Harthy gelling in the Pro-Am class category. A top-four place finish during the opening round at Monza got the championship challenge off to an excellent start and was immediately followed up with a maiden Blancpain podium on home-soil at Silverstone. Just missing out on a second podium at Paul Ricard, the squad went into the blue riband 24 hours of Spa event in strong form. Unfortunately after leading the Pro-Am Class and overall race briefly, contact in the early hours saw the #44 Aston drop down the order and derailed the hopes of another podium finish.

Despite the final two rounds of the campaign failing to produce the deserved results, David Bartrum's outfit fought back from adversity in the season finale to take fourth in the Pro-Am Championship standings – missing out on the third spot by just a single point.

2016 would be a season best forgotten for Motorbase in the British GT. A huge accident during the opening round at Brands Hatch totalled the squad's #8 Vantage and despite an epic rebuild by the Motorbase crew to get back on track for the following round – the season failed to deliver any real high points for the team. Dryburgh and Wylie secured points in five of the nine rounds but disappointingly a lack of consistency and pace failed to secure the results requited to mount a successful challenge.
