= 2009 Porsche Carrera Cup Great Britain =

The 2009 Porsche Carrera Cup Great Britain was the seventh Porsche Carrera Cup Great Britain season. The season consisted of twenty rounds, beginning on 5 April at Brands Hatch's Indy circuit and ending on 4 October at the circuit's Grand Prix layout. The series supported the British Touring Car Championship throughout the season. Tim Bridgman took his first title, holding off the challenges of reigning champion Tim Harvey, James Sutton and Michael Caine. In the other classes, Glynn Geddie took home the Pro-Am 1 title, while Glenn McMenamin won Pro-Am 2.

== Entry list ==
- All drivers raced in Porsche 911 GT3s. Guest drivers in italics.

Team	No	Driver	Rounds
Redline Racing	1	(United Kingdom) Tim Harvey	All
Redline Racing	5	(United Kingdom) Dean Smith	1
Redline Racing	5	(United Kingdom) James Sutton	2–10
Redline Racing	11	(United Kingdom) Lewis Hopkins	All
JMH	6	(United Kingdom) Aaron Scott	3
Team Parker Racing	7	(United Kingdom) Tim Bridgman	All
Team Parker Racing	42	(United Kingdom) Charles Bateman	6–7
Team Parker Racing	43	(United Kingdom) Tom Bradshaw	All
Motorbase Performance	44	(United Kingdom) Michael Caine	All
Pro-Am 1
JMH	6	(United Kingdom) Andy Ruhan	6, 10
Team Parker Racing	8	(United Kingdom) Glynn Geddie	All
Team Parker Racing	10	(Republic of Ireland) Michael Leonard	1, 3–4, 6, 8, 10
JHR	24	(United Kingdom) Derek Pierce	1–8, 10
JHR	25	(United Kingdom) Robert Lawson	All
Redline Racing	34	(United Kingdom) Tony Gilham	All
Motorbase Performance	48	(United Kingdom) Ollie Jackson	All
In2Racing	50	(United Kingdom) Paul Hogarth	3, 5–10
RSS Performance	55	(United Kingdom) John Quartermaine	1, 10
RSS Performance	68	(United Kingdom) Matt Kelly	2
Celtic Speed	68	(United Kingdom) Tommy Dreelan	2–10
GT Marques	87	(United Kingdom) Alex Martin	9–10
Pro-Am 2
Parr Motorsport	13	(United Kingdom) Glenn McMenamin	3–4, 6–10
Parr Motorsport	23	(United Kingdom) Robin Clark	1–4, 6–10
Kinfaun Racing	18	(United Kingdom) John Gaw	8
Apex Motorsport	19	(United Kingdom) Andrew Tate	6, 8–10
Motorbase Performance	28	(United Kingdom) George Richardson	1
Motorbase Performance	28	(Republic of Ireland) Michael Corridan	4
Motorbase Performance	28	(United Kingdom) Steve Parish	9–10
RSS Performance	36	(Republic of Ireland) Karl Leonard	1, 3–4, 6, 8, 10
GT Marques	40	(United Kingdom) Paul Mace	2, 6, 9–10
Celtic Speed	79	(United Kingdom) Bob Lyons	3–10
Celtic Speed	99	(United Kingdom) George Brewster	5, 7, 9–10
Guest
Team Parker Racing	9	(United States) Jake Rosenzweig	1–2, 10
Porsche Cars GB	61	(United Kingdom) Anthony Reid	1
Porsche Cars GB	61	(United Kingdom) Ben McLoughlin	2
Porsche Cars GB	61	(United Kingdom) Aaron Steele	3
Porsche Cars GB	61	(United Kingdom) Richard Singleton	4
Porsche Cars GB	61	(New Zealand) Aaron Slight	5
Porsche Cars GB	61	(United Kingdom) Jeremy Clark	6
Porsche Cars GB	61	(United Kingdom) Andrew Herron	7
Porsche Cars GB	61	(United Kingdom) Paul Winter	8
Porsche Cars GB	61	(United Kingdom) Tiffany Chittenden	9
Porsche Cars GB	61	(United Kingdom) Mark Higgins	10
Motorbase Performance	66	(United Kingdom) Liam Griffin	8

== Calendar ==
All races were held in the United Kingdom.

Round		Venue	Date	Pole	Fastest lap	Winning driver	Winning team
1	R1	Brands Hatch Indy, Kent	5 April	(United Kingdom) Tim Bridgman	(United Kingdom) Tim Bridgman	(United Kingdom) Tim Bridgman	Team Parker Racing
1	R2	Brands Hatch Indy, Kent	5 April	(United Kingdom) Tim Bridgman	(United Kingdom) Tim Bridgman	(United Kingdom) Tim Bridgman	Team Parker Racing
2	R3	Thruxton Circuit, Hampshire	25 April	(United Kingdom) Tim Bridgman	(United Kingdom) Tim Harvey	(United Kingdom) Tim Harvey	Redline Racing
2	R4	Thruxton Circuit, Hampshire	25 April	(United Kingdom) Tim Bridgman	(United Kingdom) Michael Caine	(United Kingdom) Michael Caine	Motorbase Performance
3	R5	Donington Park, Lancashire	17 May	(United Kingdom) Tim Bridgman	(United Kingdom) James Sutton	(United Kingdom) Michael Caine	Motorbase Performance
3	R6	Donington Park, Lancashire	17 May	(United Kingdom) Tim Bridgman	(United Kingdom) Tim Bridgman	(United Kingdom) James Sutton	Redline Racing
4	R7	Oulton Park, Cheshire	30 May	(United Kingdom) Tim Bridgman	(United Kingdom) Tim Bridgman	(United Kingdom) Tim Bridgman	Team Parker Racing
4	R8	Oulton Park, Cheshire	31 May	(United Kingdom) Tim Bridgman	(United Kingdom) James Sutton	(United Kingdom) Tim Bridgman	Team Parker Racing
5	R9	Croft Circuit, North Yorkshire	14 June	(United Kingdom) Tim Bridgman	(United Kingdom) Tim Bridgman	(United Kingdom) Tim Bridgman	Team Parker Racing
5	R10	Croft Circuit, North Yorkshire	14 June	(United Kingdom) Tim Bridgman	(United Kingdom) Michael Caine	(United Kingdom) James Sutton	Redline Racing
6	R11	Snetterton Motor Racing Circuit, Norfolk	2 August	(United Kingdom) Tim Harvey	(United Kingdom) Tim Harvey	(United Kingdom) Tim Harvey	Redline Racing
6	R12	Snetterton Motor Racing Circuit, Norfolk	2 August	(United Kingdom) James Sutton	(United Kingdom) James Sutton	(United Kingdom) Tim Harvey	Redline Racing
7	R13	Knockhill Racing Circuit, Fife	16 August	(United Kingdom) Tim Bridgman	(United Kingdom) Glynn Geddie	(United Kingdom) Michael Caine	Motorbase Performance
7	R14	Knockhill Racing Circuit, Fife	16 August	(United Kingdom) Tim Harvey	(United Kingdom) Michael Caine	(United Kingdom) Tim Bridgman	Team Parker Racing
8	R15	Silverstone Circuit, Northamptonshire	30 August	(United Kingdom) Tim Bridgman	(United Kingdom) James Sutton	(United Kingdom) James Sutton	Redline Racing
8	R16	Silverstone Circuit, Northamptonshire	30 August	(United Kingdom) Tim Bridgman	(United Kingdom) James Sutton	(United Kingdom) James Sutton	Redline Racing
9	R17	Rockingham Motor Speedway, Northamptonshire	19 September	(United Kingdom) James Sutton	(United Kingdom) Michael Caine	(United Kingdom) James Sutton	Redline Racing
9	R18	Rockingham Motor Speedway, Northamptonshire	20 September	(United Kingdom) James Sutton	(United Kingdom) Tom Bradshaw	(United Kingdom) James Sutton	Redline Racing
10	R19	Brands Hatch GP, Kent	4 October	(United Kingdom) Tim Bridgman	(United Kingdom) Tim Bridgman	(United Kingdom) Tim Bridgman	Team Parker Racing
10	R20	Brands Hatch GP, Kent	4 October	(United Kingdom) Tim Bridgman	(United Kingdom) Tim Bridgman	(United Kingdom) Tim Bridgman	Team Parker Racing

== Driver's Standings ==
Pos	Driver	BHI		THR		DON		OUL		CRO		SNE		KNO		SIL		ROC		BHGP		Pts
1	(United Kingdom) Tim Bridgman	**1**	**1**	**3**	**5**	**DNS**	**2**	**1**	**1**	**1**	**5**	3	2	**7**	1	**2**	**DSQ**	3	3	**1**	**1**	324
2	(United Kingdom) James Sutton			4	3	3	1	2	2	2	1	2	**3**	11	3	1	1	**1**	**1**	2	2	320
3	(United Kingdom) Tim Harvey	2	2	1	2	2	3	3	4	4	3	**1**	1	6	**2**	3	Ret	2	4	5	3	316
4	(United Kingdom) Michael Caine	3	3	2	1	1	6	Ret	3	3	2	4	Ret	1	4	4	13	4	2	6	Ret	261
5	(United Kingdom) Glynn Geddie	8	5	8	13	DNS	5	9	Ret	Ret	NC	5	4	2	6	5	2	Ret	8	3	4	174
6	(United Kingdom) Robert Lawson	Ret	9	5	9	5	7	5	5	6	4	Ret	8	3	9	Ret	4	5	Ret	8	6	171
7	(United Kingdom) Ollie Jackson	10	8	13	10	8	14	7	7	8	6	6	7	5	10	7	12	6	5	10	7	163
8	(United Kingdom) Tom Bradshaw	4	Ret	10	7	4	4	DNS	10	5	Ret	9	6	9	5	Ret	Ret	Ret	7	4	5	149
9	(United Kingdom) Tony Gilham	7	Ret	6	6	6	9	6	9	9	8	8	5	10	7	6	10	Ret	6	Ret	Ret	141
10	(United Kingdom) Lewis Hopkins	Ret	11	Ret	12	Ret	DNS	10	Ret	7	11	7	11	12	11	8	Ret	7	11	9	12	92
11	(United Kingdom) Derek Pierce	9	10	12	11	7	13	Ret	8	12	Ret	12	13	Ret	12	Ret	6			7	Ret	86
12	(Republic of Ireland) Michael Leonard	6	7			Ret	8	11	6			Ret	10			Ret	7			11	9	72
13	(United Kingdom) Glenn McMenamin					Ret	Ret	13	11			11	15	13	15	10	9	9	9	15	13	54
14	(Republic of Ireland) Karl Leonard	Ret	12			10	11	4	Ret			Ret	9			9	3			Ret	10	53
15	(United Kingdom) Paul Hogarth					12	15			13	10	Ret	14	14	NC	11	8	Ret	12	14	15	46
16	(United Kingdom) Tommy Dreelan			14	16	14	17	15	12	14	13	14	20	17	14	12	14	12	14	22	20	41
17	(United Kingdom) Charles Bateman											Ret	9	4	8							29
18	(United Kingdom) Bob Lyons					13	16	12	DSQ	15	12	15	17	15	Ret	13	11	14	16	19	18	27
19	(United Kingdom) Dean Smith	5	4																			26
20	(United Kingdom) Paul Mace			13	15							Ret	16					DSQ	13	12	11	22
21	(United Kingdom) George Brewster									10	9			16	13					16	21	18
22	(United Kingdom) Robin Clark	12	15	16	17	15	18	Ret	14			16	21	18	16	17	17	15	17	24	24	16
23	(United Kingdom) Alex Martin																	10	10	13	23	15
24	(United Kingdom) John Gaw															Ret	5					12
25	(United Kingdom) Aaron Scott					11	12															11
26	(United Kingdom) Steve Parish																	8	Ret	21	16	10
27	(United Kingdom) Matt Kelly			15	14																	8
28	(United Kingdom) John Quartermaine	11	14																	20	19	8
29	(United Kingdom) Andy Ruhan											13	18							18	17	8
30	(Republic of Ireland) Michael Corridan							15	13													4
31	(United Kingdom) Andrew Tate											17	19			15	18	13	Ret	23	22	4
32	(United Kingdom) George Richardson	DSQ	13																			4
guest drivers ineligible for points
	(United States) Jake Rosenzweig	Ret	6	7	4															Ret	8	0
	(New Zealand) Aaron Slight									11	7											0
	(United Kingdom) Ben McLoughlin			9	8																	0
	(United Kingdom) Aaron Steele					9	10															0
	(United Kingdom) Jeremy Clark											10	12									0
	(United Kingdom) Andrew Herron													8	Ret							0
	(United Kingdom) Richard Singleton							8	Ret													0
	(United Kingdom) Tiffany Chittenden																	11	15			0
	(United Kingdom) Liam Griffin															14	16					0
	(United Kingdom) Mark Higgins																			17	14	0
	(United Kingdom) Paul Winter															16	15					0
	(United Kingdom) Anthony Reid	Ret	Ret																			0
Pos	Driver	BHI		THR		DON		OUL		CRO		SNE		KNO		SIL		ROC		BHGP		Pts

Colour	Result
Gold	Winner
Silver	Second place
Bronze	Third place
Green	Points classification
Blue	Non-points classification
Blue	Non-classified finish (NC)
Purple	Retired, not classified (Ret)
Red	Did not qualify (DNQ)
Red	Did not pre-qualify (DNPQ)
Black	Disqualified (DSQ)
White	Did not start (DNS)
White	Withdrew (WD)
White	Race cancelled (C)
Blank	Did not practice (DNP)
Blank	Did not arrive (DNA)
Blank	Excluded (EX)

**Bold** – Pole (1 point)
Italics – Fastest Lap (1 point)
