= 2011 Porsche Carrera Cup Great Britain =

The 2011 Porsche Carrera Cup Great Britain was the ninth season of the Porsche Carrera Cup Great Britain series. The series again featured on the same package as the British Touring Car Championship, and as such benefited from live coverage at each round on ITV4 in the United Kingdom.

2011 will see the introduction of a new 911 GT3 Cup car, featuring more power, downforce and other technological changes.

== Entry list ==
Porsche had announced a capacity entry list for 2011 with several new teams expected to join the championship, but a grid of 25 cars appeared at the first meeting.

- All drivers will race in Porsche 911 GT3s. Guest drivers in italics.

Team	No.	Driver	Rounds
Motorbase Performance	1	(United Kingdom) Tim Harvey	1–3, 5
Motorbase Performance	1	(United Kingdom) Kieran Vernon	4, 6–10
Motorbase Performance	2	(United Kingdom) Michael Caine	1–4, 6
Motorbase Performance	27	(United Kingdom) Nick Tandy	9–10
Team Parker Racing	5	(United Kingdom) Richard Plant	All
Team Parker Racing	18	(United Kingdom) Euan Hankey	All
Team Parker Racing	44	(United Kingdom) Sam Tordoff	All
Team Parker Racing	70	(United Kingdom) Stephen Jelley	All
Redline Racing	9	(United Kingdom) Michael Meadows	All
Redline Racing	10	(United Kingdom) James Sutton	All
Redline Racing	16	(United Kingdom) Benji Hetherington	All
Parr Motorsport	14	(United Kingdom) Ben Barker	6–7
Pro-Am 1
Motorbase Performance	3	(Switzerland) Daniele Perfetti	1–4, 6–10
Motorbase Performance	28	(United Kingdom) George Richardson	1–4, 6–10
Redline Racing	7	(Oman) Ahmad Al Harthy	All
Juta Racing	8	(Lithuania) Jonas Gelžinis	All
Team Parker Racing	17	(Republic of Ireland) Michael Leonard	9–10
Team Parker Racing	24	(United Kingdom) Derek Pierce	All
Team Parker Racing	87	(United Kingdom) Alex Martin	All
Parr Motorsport	17	(Republic of Ireland) Michael Leonard	1
Parr Motorsport	21	(Republic of Ireland) Karl Leonard	9–10
GT Marques	22	(Sweden) Freddy Nordström	6, 10
Celtic Speed	45	(United Kingdom) Rory Butcher	All
Pro-Am 2
Motorbase Performance	4	(United Kingdom) Steve Parish	1, 3–4, 6–10
Redline Racing	6	(United Kingdom) Andrew Shelley	1–4
Redline Racing	20	(Turkey) Yücel Özbek	6–10
Redline Racing	99	(United Kingdom) Keith Webster	All
Celtic Speed	11	(United Kingdom) George Brewster	All
Celtic Speed	56	(United Kingdom) Tommy Dreelan	All
Juta Racing	12	(Lithuania) Rytis Garbaravičius	7
Juta Racing	19	(Lithuania) Tautvydas Barštys	1–2, 5, 10
Parr Motorsport	15	(Australia) Richard Denny	All
Parr Motorsport	39	(United Kingdom) Chris Dyer	8
Team Parker Racing	42	(United Kingdom) John Taylor	1–4, 6–7, 10
Guest
Team Parker Racing	360	(United Kingdom) Chris Harris	5
Team Parker Racing	366	(United Kingdom) Stephen Liquorish	5
Rennsport Racing	395	(United Kingdom) Peter Smallwood	5

== Race calendar and results ==
On 8 September 2010, the British Touring Car Championship announced the race calendar for the 2011 season for all of the series competing on the TOCA package. On 14 January 2011, Porsche released an amended calendar with the meeting at Croft being replaced by a single race in Germany at the Nürburgring Nordschleife as part of the Porsche Carrera World Cup. As such, the championship will be contested over 19 races.

Round		Circuit	Date	Pole position	Fastest lap	Winning driver	Winning team
1	R1	Brands Hatch (Indy), Kent	2 April	(United Kingdom) Stephen Jelley	(United Kingdom) Stephen Jelley	(United Kingdom) Euan Hankey	Parker with Juta
1	R2	Brands Hatch (Indy), Kent	3 April	(United Kingdom) Stephen Jelley	(United Kingdom) Stephen Jelley	(United Kingdom) Stephen Jelley	Parker with Juta
2	R3	Donington Park, Leicestershire	17 April	(Lithuania) Jonas Gelžinis	(United Kingdom) Sam Tordoff	(United Kingdom) Euan Hankey	Parker with Juta
2	R4	Donington Park, Leicestershire	17 April	(United Kingdom) Michael Meadows	(United Kingdom) Michael Meadows	(United Kingdom) Michael Meadows	SAS Redline Racing
3	R5	Thruxton Circuit, Hampshire	1 May	(United Kingdom) James Sutton	(United Kingdom) James Sutton	(United Kingdom) James Sutton	SAS Redline Racing
3	R6	Thruxton Circuit, Hampshire	1 May	(United Kingdom) James Sutton	(United Kingdom) James Sutton	(United Kingdom) James Sutton	SAS Redline Racing
4	R7	Oulton Park, Cheshire	4 June	(United Kingdom) Michael Meadows	(United Kingdom) Stephen Jelley	(United Kingdom) James Sutton	SAS Redline Racing
4	R8	Oulton Park, Cheshire	5 June	(United Kingdom) Michael Meadows	(United Kingdom) Stephen Jelley	(United Kingdom) Stephen Jelley	Parker with Juta
5	R9	(Germany) Nürburgring Nordschleife, Nürburg	25 June	(United Kingdom) James Sutton	(United Kingdom) Rory Butcher	(United Kingdom) Tim Harvey	Nationwide Motorbase
6	R10	Snetterton Motor Racing Circuit, Norfolk	7 August	(United Kingdom) Michael Meadows	(United Kingdom) Ben Barker	(United Kingdom) Stephen Jelley	Parker with Juta
6	R11	Snetterton Motor Racing Circuit, Norfolk	7 August	(United Kingdom) Stephen Jelley	(United Kingdom) Stephen Jelley	(United Kingdom) Stephen Jelley	Parker with Juta
7	R12	Knockhill Racing Circuit, Fife	4 September	(United Kingdom) Michael Meadows	(United Kingdom) James Sutton	(United Kingdom) Michael Meadows	SAS Redline Racing
7	R13	Knockhill Racing Circuit, Fife	4 September	(United Kingdom) Euan Hankey	(United Kingdom) Michael Meadows	(United Kingdom) Euan Hankey	Parker with Juta
8	R14	Rockingham Motor Speedway, Northamptonshire	18 September	(United Kingdom) Euan Hankey	(United Kingdom) Michael Meadows	(United Kingdom) Euan Hankey	Parker with Juta
8	R15	Rockingham Motor Speedway, Northamptonshire	18 September	(United Kingdom) Euan Hankey	(United Kingdom) James Sutton	(United Kingdom) Euan Hankey	Parker with Juta
9	R16	Brands Hatch (GP), Kent	1 October	(United Kingdom) Nick Tandy	(United Kingdom) Nick Tandy	(United Kingdom) Nick Tandy	Nationwide Motorbase
9	R17	Brands Hatch (GP), Kent	2 October	(United Kingdom) Nick Tandy	(United Kingdom) Nick Tandy	(United Kingdom) Stephen Jelley	Parker with Juta
10	R18	Silverstone (National), Northamptonshire	16 October	(United Kingdom) Nick Tandy	(United Kingdom) Nick Tandy	(United Kingdom) Nick Tandy	Nationwide Motorbase
10	R19	Silverstone (National), Northamptonshire	16 October	(United Kingdom) Nick Tandy	(United Kingdom) Nick Tandy	(United Kingdom) Nick Tandy	Nationwide Motorbase

== Championship standings ==
Pos	Driver	BHI		DON		THR		OUL		NÜR	SNE		KNO		ROC		BHGP		SIL		Pen	Pts
1	(United Kingdom) James Sutton	2	2	3	2	1	1	1	3	Ret	7	4	3	4	3	2	2	5	2	2		305
2	(United Kingdom) Michael Meadows	4	5	2	1	4	4	3	2	6	2	2	1	2	2	4	4	2	3	17		298
3	(United Kingdom) Stephen Jelley	3	1	Ret	5	3	2	2	1	2	1	1	6	5	5	3	3	1	Ret	6		282
4	(United Kingdom) Euan Hankey	1	11	1	3	2	3	9	6	Ret	5	6	2	1	1	1	Ret	3	6	Ret		241
5	(United Kingdom) Richard Plant	7	6	4	7	10	8	6	7	8	4	3	8	9	4	6	16	8	7	4		183
6	(Lithuania) Jonas Gelžinis	10	8	7	4	5	5	5	12	7	6	7	12	11	7	5	6	Ret	5	5	3	167
7	(United Kingdom) Sam Tordoff	5	4	8	Ret	9	9	Ret	10	3	10	9	5	8	11	Ret	14	4	4	10		145
8	(United Kingdom) Benji Hetherington	12	10	5	10	8	10	8	13	Ret	11	8	4	6	8	7	Ret	7	18	3		132
9	(United Kingdom) Rory Butcher	8	Ret	9	11	7	11	10	5	4	13	12	13	7	20	14	8	10	8	Ret	9	101
10	(Oman) Ahmad Al Harthy	9	20	6	9	12	12	7	8	Ret	18	18	11	12	Ret	9	7	9	10	8		95
11	(United Kingdom) Michael Caine	6	7	10	8	Ret	7	4	4		8	10										84
12	(United Kingdom) Derek Pierce	13	9	13	Ret	11	13	12	15	5	15	13	9	13	10	8	Ret	12	11	12		79
13	(United Kingdom) Kieran Vernon							11	11		9	11	7	10	6	16	5	6	Ret	Ret		69
14	(United Kingdom) Nick Tandy																1	Ret	1	1		68
15	(United Kingdom) George Richardson	17	13	Ret	13	14	14	13	9		19	16	10	14	9	10	10	11	9	7		68
16	(United Kingdom) Tim Harvey	23	3	17	6	6	6			1												66
17	(United Kingdom) Ben Barker										3	5	Ret	3								45
18	(Switzerland) Daniele Perfetti	18	Ret	11	12	15	15	17	Ret		14	Ret	16	Ret	18	11	9	14	13	13		33
19	(United Kingdom) Alex Martin	11	Ret	16	14	13	21	14	14	9	12	14			Ret	Ret	Ret	21	12	14	6	27
20	(Republic of Ireland) Michael Leonard	14	12														Ret	Ret	22	9		13
21	(United Kingdom) George Brewster	15	14	15	15	Ret	16	Ret	18	Ret	17	23	14	15	19	20	11	17	14	20	2	13
22	(Turkey) Yücel Özbek										22	19	Ret	16	12	12	13	16	17	Ret		11
23	(Australia) Richard Denny	19	Ret	18	21	17	18	19	21	10	20	Ret	15	17	16	19	15	15	19	19		10
24	(United Kingdom) Keith Webster	21	17	14	17	DSQ	17	18	16	Ret	16	17			14	15	12	18	15	15	2	9
25	(Republic of Ireland) Karl Leonard																Ret	13	DSQ	11		8
26	(United Kingdom) Andrew Shelley	20	15	12	16	16	19	15	19													6
27	(United Kingdom) Steve Parish	16	Ret			Ret	20	16	17		21	20	18	Ret	13	13	Ret	19	16	18		6
28	(Sweden) Freddy Nordström										25	15							24	16		1
29	(Lithuania) Tautvydas Barštys	22	16	19	18					DNS									20	Ret		0
30	(United Kingdom) Tommy Dreelan	25	18	21	19	18	22	20	20	Ret	23	21	17	18	17	18	17	20	21	22		0
31	(United Kingdom) John Taylor	24	19	20	20	19	23	21	22		24	22	19	20					23	21		0
32	(Lithuania) Rytis Garbaravičius												20	19								0
Guest drivers ineligible for points
	(United Kingdom) Chris Harris									11												0
	(United Kingdom) Chris Dyer														15	17						0
	(United Kingdom) Stephen Liquorish									Ret												0
	(United Kingdom) Peter Smallwood									Ret												0
Pos	Driver	BHI		DON		THR		OUL		NÜR	SNE		KNO		ROC		BHGP		SIL		Pen	Pts

Colour	Result
Gold	Winner
Silver	Second place
Bronze	Third place
Green	Points classification
Blue	Non-points classification
Blue	Non-classified finish (NC)
Purple	Retired, not classified (Ret)
Red	Did not qualify (DNQ)
Red	Did not pre-qualify (DNPQ)
Black	Disqualified (DSQ)
White	Did not start (DNS)
White	Withdrew (WD)
White	Race cancelled (C)
Blank	Did not practice (DNP)
Blank	Did not arrive (DNA)
Blank	Excluded (EX)

Position	1st	2nd	3rd	4th	5th	6th	7th	8th	9th	10th	11th	12th	13th	14th	15th	Pole	F. Lap
Points	20	18	16	14	12	10	9	8	7	6	5	4	3	2	1	1	1
