= 2007 Porsche Carrera Cup Great Britain =

The 2007 Porsche Carrera Cup Great Britain was the fifth season of the one-make championship. It consisted of 20 rounds, beginning on 31 March at Brands Hatch and finishing on 14 October at Thruxton. The series supported the British Touring Car Championship throughout the season. James Sutton won the championship at his first attempt, ahead of Tim Harvey and Steven Kane after a close points battle.

== Entry list ==
- All drivers raced in Porsche 911 GT3s.

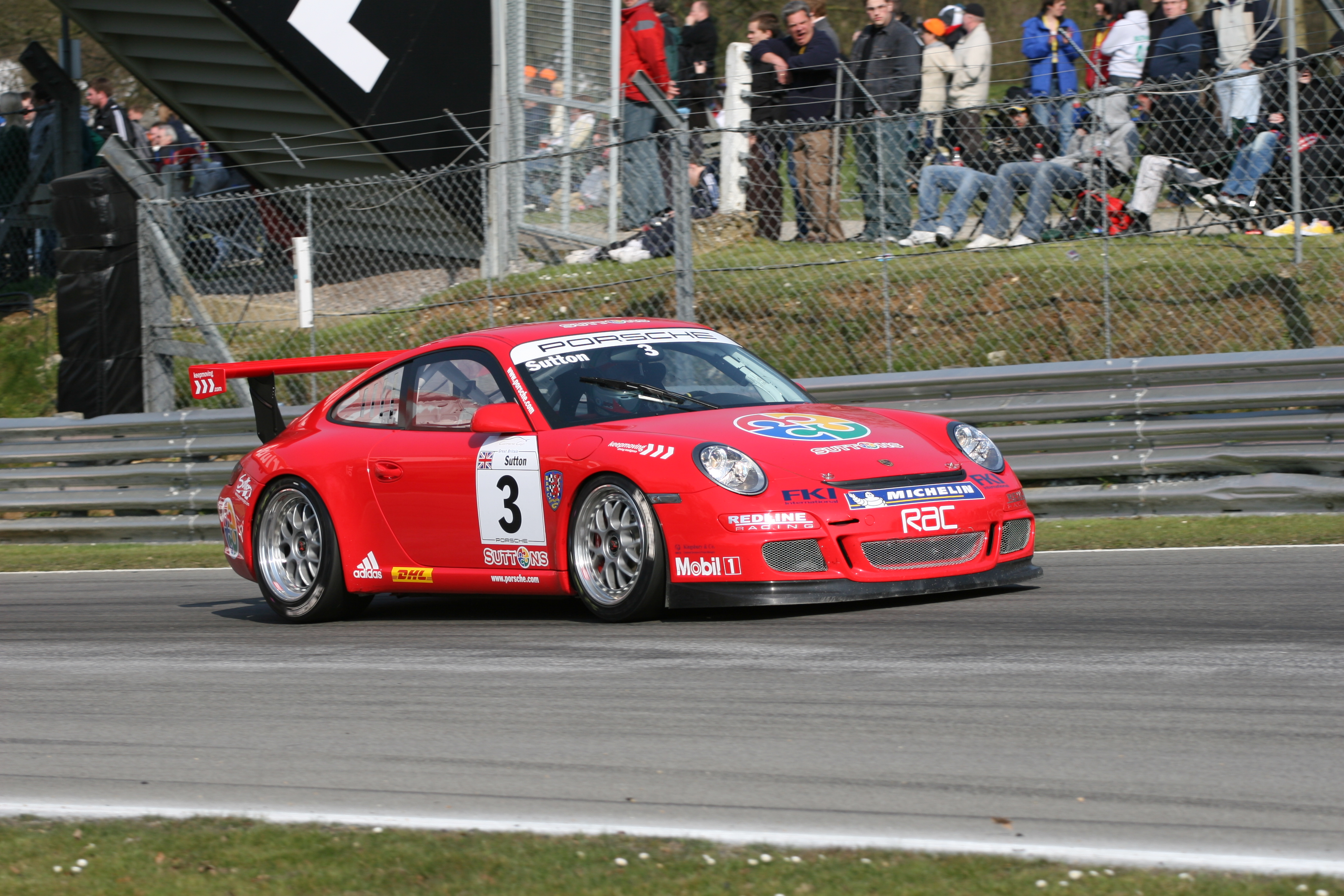
2007 Champion James Sutton.

Team	No	Driver	Rounds
Redline Racing	2	(United Kingdom) Tim Harvey	All
Redline Racing	3	(United Kingdom) James Sutton	All
Motorbase Performance	7	(United Kingdom) Sam Hancock	All
Motorbase Performance	8	(United Kingdom) Steven Kane	All
QM Engineering	9	(United Kingdom) James Pickford	1-3
QM Engineering	45	(United Kingdom) Kelvin Burt	3
Team Parker Racing	19	(United Kingdom) David Epton	6
Team Parker Racing	21	(United Kingdom) Rob Collard	1-3
Team Parker Racing	32	(United Kingdom) Jon Barnes	6-10
Team Parker Racing	44	(United Kingdom) Michael Caine	All
Team4Car with Confused.com	34	(United Kingdom) Mark Cole	10
Team RPM	89	(Republic of Ireland) Matt Griffin	10
Team TWC/Willmott Racing	99	(United Kingdom) Graeme Mundy	10
Pro-Am
Redline Racing	5	(United Kingdom) Nigel Rice	All
Redline Racing	50	(United Kingdom) Maxi Jazz	4, 6-8
Motorbase Performance	6	(United Kingdom) Andy Britnell	All
Motorbase Performance	9	(United Kingdom) Gary Britnell	5
Team Parker Racing	10	(United Kingdom) Nick Leason	8
Team Parker Racing	20	(United Kingdom) Charles Bateman	All
Trackspeed	11	(United Kingdom) David Ashburn	1
Team RPM	11	(United Kingdom) Steve Clark	7-8, 10
Team RPM	88	(United Kingdom) Peter Bamford	3, 10
Chad Racing	23	(United Kingdom) Iain Dockerill	7
Team O	24	(United Kingdom) Pete Osborne	All
Team TWC/Willmott Racing	31	(United Kingdom) Peter Morris	5
Team TWC/Willmott Racing	70	(United Kingdom) Colin Willmott	2-6, 8-10
ABG Motorsport	37	(United Kingdom) Mark Stephenson	5
Guest
Porsche Motorsport	1	(United Kingdom) Jon Barnes	1
Porsche Motorsport	1	(United Kingdom) Andrew Kirkaldy	2
Porsche Motorsport	1	(United Kingdom) Matt Howson	3
Porsche Motorsport	1	(United Kingdom) Peter Morris	4
Porsche Motorsport	1	(United Kingdom) Nathan Freke	5
Porsche Motorsport	1	(United Kingdom) Oliver Jarvis	6
Porsche Motorsport	1	(United Kingdom) Ian White	7
Porsche Motorsport	1	(United Kingdom) Oliver Turvey	8
Porsche Motorsport	1	(United Kingdom) Jeremy Metcalfe	9
Porsche Motorsport	1	(United Kingdom) Jonny Kane	10

== Calendar & Winners ==
All races were held in the United Kingdom.

Round		Venue	Date	Pole position	Fastest lap	Winning driver	Winning team
1	R1	Brands Hatch Indy, Kent	31 March - 1 April	(United Kingdom) Tim Harvey	(United Kingdom) Tim Harvey	(United Kingdom) Tim Harvey	Redline Racing
1	R2	Brands Hatch Indy, Kent	31 March - 1 April		(United Kingdom) Tim Harvey	(United Kingdom) Tim Harvey	Redline Racing
2	R3	Rockingham Motor Speedway, Northamptonshire	21–22 April	(United Kingdom) James Sutton	(United Kingdom) Steven Kane	(United Kingdom) Andrew Kirkaldy	Porsche Motorsport
2	R4	Rockingham Motor Speedway, Northamptonshire	21–22 April		(United Kingdom) Steven Kane	(United Kingdom) Steven Kane	Motorbase Performance
3	R5	Thruxton Circuit, Hampshire	5–6 May	(United Kingdom) Steven Kane	(United Kingdom) Steven Kane	(United Kingdom) Steven Kane	Motorbase Performance
3	R6	Thruxton Circuit, Hampshire	5–6 May		(United Kingdom) Tim Harvey	(United Kingdom) Steven Kane	Motorbase Performance
4	R7	Croft Circuit, North Yorkshire	2–3 June	(United Kingdom) James Sutton	(United Kingdom) James Sutton	(United Kingdom) James Sutton	Redline Racing
4	R8	Croft Circuit, North Yorkshire	2–3 June		(United Kingdom) James Sutton	(United Kingdom) James Sutton	Redline Racing
5	R9	Oulton Park, Cheshire	23–24 June	(United Kingdom) Steven Kane	(United Kingdom) James Sutton	(United Kingdom) Steven Kane	Motorbase Performance
5	R10	Oulton Park, Cheshire	23–24 June		(United Kingdom) Steven Kane	(United Kingdom) Steven Kane	Motorbase Performance
6	R11	Donington Park, Leicestershire	14–15 July	(United Kingdom) James Sutton	(United Kingdom) Steven Kane	(United Kingdom) James Sutton	Redline Racing
6	R12	Donington Park, Leicestershire	14–15 July		(United Kingdom) Steven Kane	(United Kingdom) James Sutton	Redline Racing
7	R13	Snetterton Motor Racing Circuit, Norfolk	28–29 July	(United Kingdom) Tim Harvey	(United Kingdom) Steven Kane	(United Kingdom) Tim Harvey	Redline Racing
7	R14	Snetterton Motor Racing Circuit, Norfolk	28–29 July		(United Kingdom) Tim Harvey	(United Kingdom) Tim Harvey	Redline Racing
8	R15	Brands Hatch Indy, Kent	18–19 August	(United Kingdom) James Sutton	(United Kingdom) James Sutton	(United Kingdom) James Sutton	Redline Racing
8	R16	Brands Hatch Indy, Kent	18–19 August		(United Kingdom) James Sutton	(United Kingdom) James Sutton	Redline Racing
9	R17	Knockhill Racing Circuit, Fife	1–2 September	(United Kingdom) Sam Hancock	(United Kingdom) Tim Harvey	(United Kingdom) Sam Hancock	Motorbase Performance
9	R18	Knockhill Racing Circuit, Fife	1–2 September		(United Kingdom) Sam Hancock	(United Kingdom) Tim Harvey	Redline Racing
10	R19	Thruxton Circuit, Hampshire	13–14 October	(United Kingdom) Sam Hancock	(United Kingdom) Steven Kane	(United Kingdom) Steven Kane	Motorbase Performance
10	R20	Thruxton Circuit, Hampshire	13–14 October		(United Kingdom) Steven Kane	(United Kingdom) Steven Kane	Motorbase Performance

== Championship Standings ==
Points were awarded on a 20, 18, 16, 14, 12, 10, 9, 8, 7, 6, 5, 4, 3, 2, 1 basis to the top 15 finishers in each race, with 1 point for the fastest lap in each race and 1 point for pole position in the first race of each meeting.

Pos	Driver	BRA		ROC		THR		CRO		OUL		DON		SNE		BRA		KNO		THR		Pen	Pts
1	(United Kingdom) James Sutton	2	4	**10**	3	3	3	**1**	**1**	3	2	**1**	**1**	5	5	**1**	**1**	5	4	7	3		328
2	(United Kingdom) Tim Harvey	**1**	**1**	4	2	2	2	3	4	4	3	4	Ret	**1**	**1**	3	8	2	1	4	2	2	324
3	(United Kingdom) Steven Kane	4	5	2	1	**1**	**1**	2	2	**1**	**1**	2	2	2	4	4	12	Ret	Ret	1	**1**		322
4	(United Kingdom) Michael Caine	3	2	3	4	6	5	5	6	2	4	Ret	3	3	3	5	3	3	2	3	4		282
5	(United Kingdom) Sam Hancock	8	6	5	5	4	4	4	3	5	5	3	7	4	2	Ret	5	**1**	**9**	**11**	11	2	242
6	(United Kingdom) Nigel Rice	6	8	7	7	9	8	6	5	9	9	7	4	6	7	8	7	NC	7	8	5		186
7	(United Kingdom) Andy Britnell	10	7	9	8	10	11	7	7	7	7	9	Ret	7	8	7	6	7	5	10	Ret		159
8	(United Kingdom) Charles Bateman	11	10	8	9	12	9	9	9	8	8	6	Ret	9	9	Ret	10	6	6	9	7		142
9	(United Kingdom) Pete Osborne	13	11	Ret	10	11	10	8	8	10	11	10	6	8	10	9	9	9	10	12	9		134
10	(United Kingdom) Jon Barnes	5	3									5	9	Ret	6	2	2	4	3	2	12		119
11	(United Kingdom) Colin Willmott			11	11	WD	WD	11	10	11	10	12	8			11	Ret	8	Ret	13	10		75
12	(United Kingdom) Rob Collard	7	12	6	6	7	7																56
13	(United Kingdom) Steve Clark													10	12	10	11			WD	WD		24
14	(Republic of Ireland) Matt Griffin																			5	6		22
15	(United Kingdom) Maxi Jazz							WD	WD			11	10	12	Ret	13	Ret						22
16	(United Kingdom) James Pickford	9	9	WD	WD	WD	WD																16
17	(United Kingdom) Kelvin Burt					5	Ret																12
18	(United Kingdom) Peter Morris							10	11	13	12												9
19	(United Kingdom) Peter Bamford					13	12													Ret	DNS		9
20	(United Kingdom) Gary Britnell									12	13												9
21	(United Kingdom) Nick Leason															12	13						9
22	(United Kingdom) Iain Dockerill													13	13								8
23	(United Kingdom) David Ashburn	12	Ret																				5
NC	(United Kingdom) Mark Stephenson									Ret	Ret												0
NC	(United Kingdom) David Epton											Ret	Ret										0
NC	(United Kingdom) Mark Cole																			Ret	Ret		0
NC	(United Kingdom) Graeme Mundy																			WD	WD		0
guest drivers ineligible for points.
	(United Kingdom) Andrew Kirkaldy			1	**Ret**																		0
	(United Kingdom) Oliver Turvey															6	4						0
	(United Kingdom) Oliver Jarvis											8	5										0
	(United Kingdom) Nathan Freke									6	6												0
	(United Kingdom) Matt Howson					8	6																0
	(United Kingdom) Jonny Kane																			6	8		0
	(United Kingdom) Jeremy Metcalfe																	Ret	8				0
	(United Kingdom) Ian White													11	11								0
Pos	Driver	BRA		ROC		THR		CRO		OUL		DON		SNE		BRA		KNO		THR		Pen	Pts

Colour	Result
Gold	Winner
Silver	Second place
Bronze	Third place
Green	Points classification
Blue	Non-points classification
Blue	Non-classified finish (NC)
Purple	Retired, not classified (Ret)
Red	Did not qualify (DNQ)
Red	Did not pre-qualify (DNPQ)
Black	Disqualified (DSQ)
White	Did not start (DNS)
White	Withdrew (WD)
White	Race cancelled (C)
Blank	Did not practice (DNP)
Blank	Did not arrive (DNA)
Blank	Excluded (EX)

**Bold** – Pole
Italics – Fastest Lap
