= Airwaves (gum) =

Brand of chewing gum

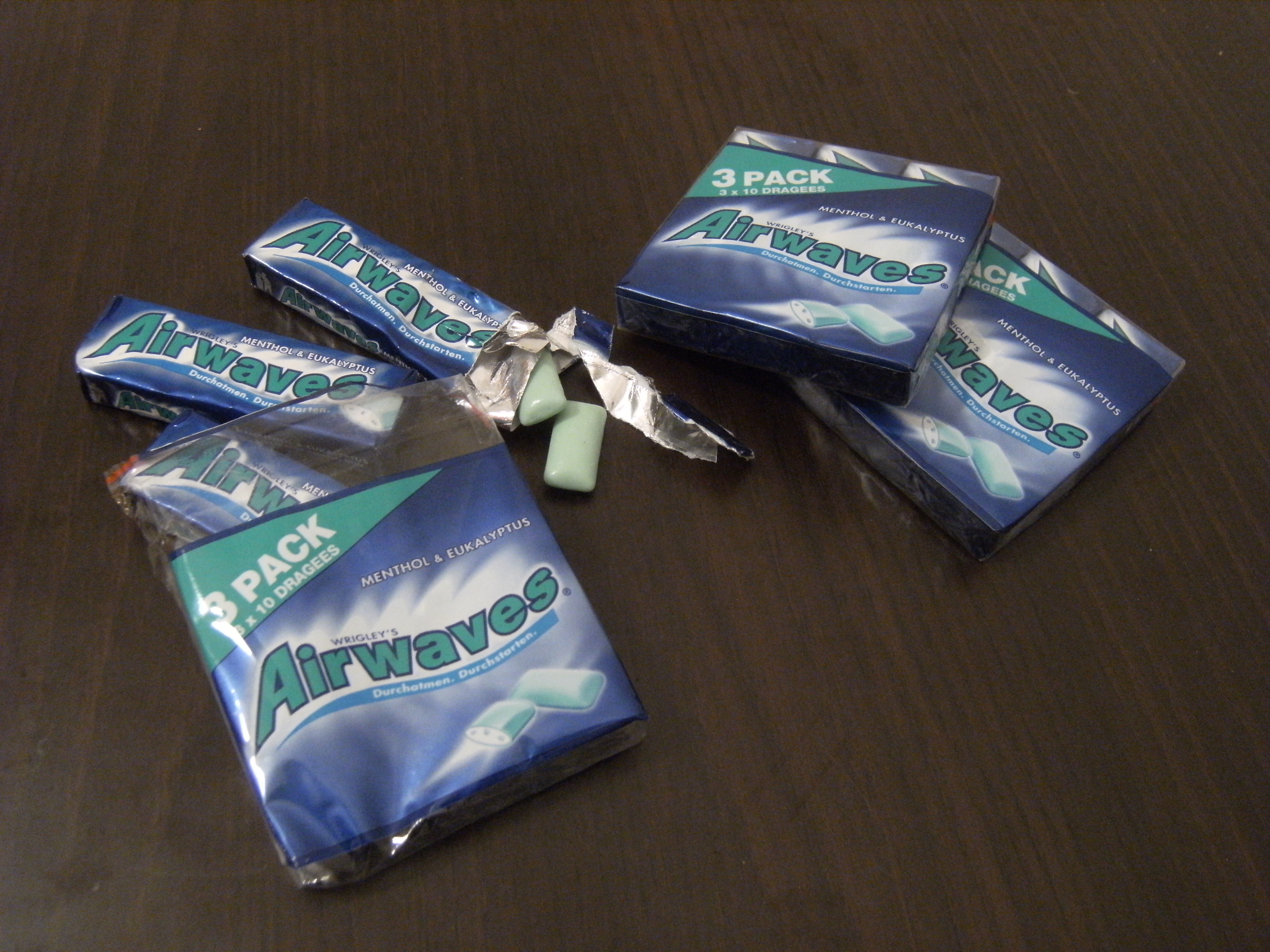
- Pack of Airwaves gum
- Product type: Chewing gum
- Current owner: Mars, Inc.
- Produced by: Wrigley Company
- Country: United Kingdom
- Introduced: 1997; 29 years ago
- Website: airwavesgum.co.uk

Airwaves is a brand of sugarfree chewing gum produced by the Wm. Wrigley Jr. Company, and sold primarily in Europe and East Asia. The brand is marketed for its intense flavor similar to the effect one would get from the consumption of cough drops (which are also sold by Wrigley's). This intensity of flavor is obtained by including Eucalyptus and Menthol in the candy coating of the tablets of gum.

This menthol and eucalyptus combination is widely used in medicated sweets to clear the head and nasal passages and to reduce the symptoms of nasal congestions and colds.

Airwaves comes in six flavors: Eucalyptus and Menthol (the blue packets), Blackcurrant and Vitamin C (the purple packets), Cherry (the red packets), Grapefruit and Menthol (the pink packets), Herbal (the light green packets) and the newly added Black Mint (Black Packet). The honey and lemon flavor has been discontinued (but is still sold in many Asian countries) along with the spicy cocktail flavor. In 2005, Airwaves Active was produced, containing guaraná.

Flavour	United Kingdom	Hong Kong
Menthol & Eucalyptus (Blue)	Current	Current
Cherry (Red)	Current	n/a
Black Mint (Black)	Current	n/a
Green Mint (Green)	Discontinued	n/a
Ginseng (Red/Orange)	Discontinued	n/a
Honey & Lemon (Yellow)	Discontinued	Current
Blackcurrant (Purple)	Current	Current
Ginger (Orange)	Discontinued	Current
Grapefruit (Pink)	n/a	Current
Herbal Mint (Light Green)	n/a	Current
ICE (Metallic Blue)	n/a	Current
FIRE (Metallic Red)	n/a	Discontinued
SUPER (Black)	n/a	Current
Ice Grape (Light Yellow)	n/a	Current
Extreme (Dark Blue, extra strong)	Current	n/a

== In popular culture ==
The chewing gum was featured in Tom Clancy's Splinter Cell: Chaos Theory several times, with Sam Fisher, the game's protagonist, eating from a clearly displayed pack in the first mission cutscene, and clearly visible next to a radio in another cutscene, suggesting that Fisher may be a fan of the gum. A blimp marketing the gum was also seen in a third cutscene in the game featuring the gum's logo.

Wrigley's Airwaves announced in March 2009 that it is to sponsor leading British Touring Car Championship team Motorbase Performance, running under the name Airwaves BMW. They are also the title sponsors of the Airwaves Plymouth Raiders, a professional basketball team, located in the company's base city of Plymouth, who compete in the British Basketball League. Late in 2008, Airwaves became the official chewing gum of the FIA World Rally Championship.
