= Stephen Jelley =

British racing driver (born 1982)

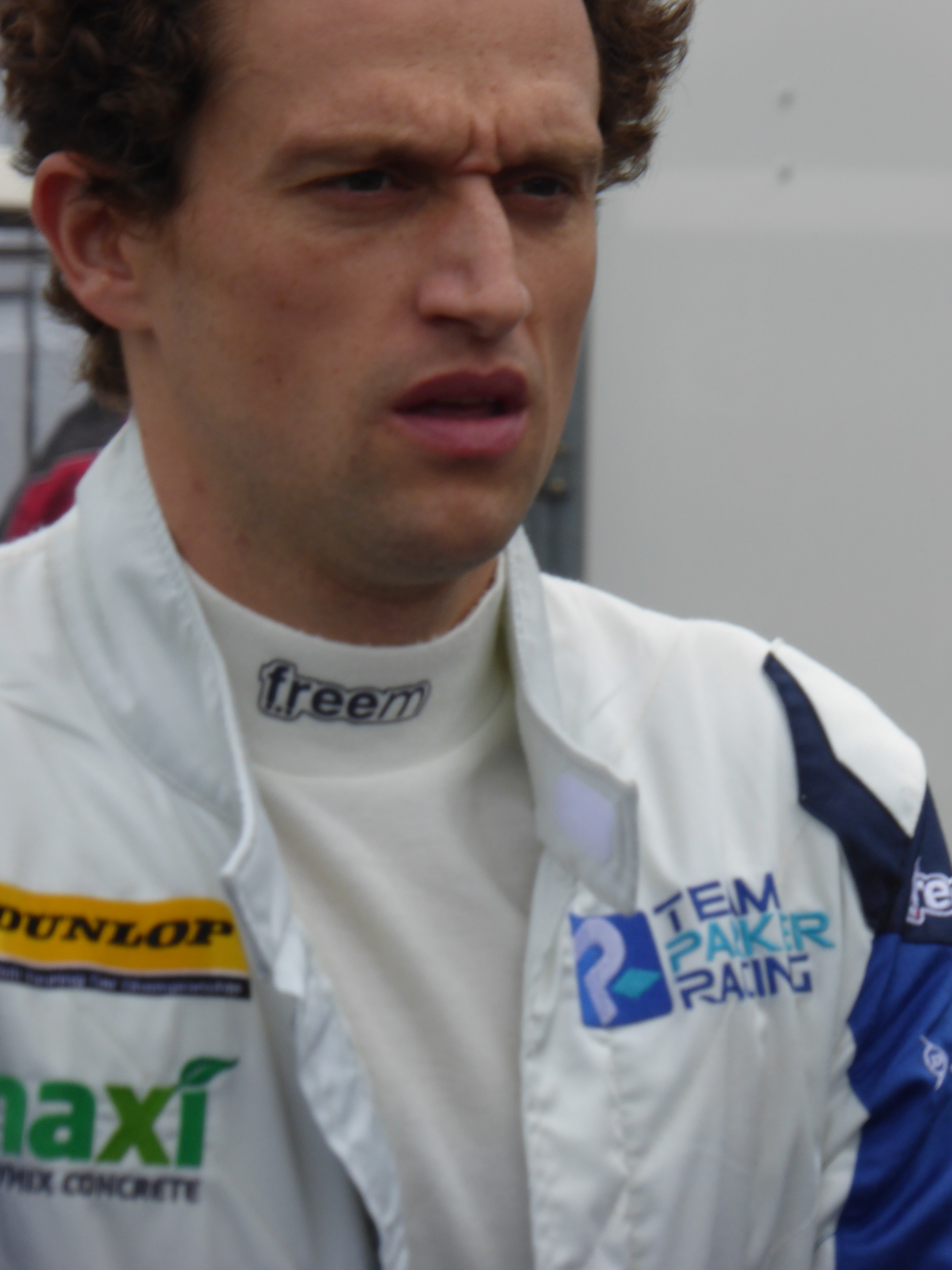
- Jelley in 2017
- Nationality: (United Kingdom) British
- Born: Stephen David Jelley; 12 May 1982 (age 44) Leicester, England

Porsche Carrera Cup Great Britain career
- Debut season: 2010
- Current team: XQS Team Parker Racing
- Categorisation: FIA Gold
- Car number: 12
- Former teams: Team Parker Racing
- Starts: 73
- Wins: 7
- Poles: 7
- Fastest laps: 9
- Best finish: 3rd in 2011

Previous series
- 2008-09, 2017-23, 2025 2015 2012–2014 2011 2010–2011, 2015–2016 2010–2013 2008 2005 2004–2007 2002–2003: British Touring Car Championship; Porsche Supercup; Blancpain Endurance Cup; International GT Open; Porsche Carrera Cup GB British GT; GP2 Asia Series; Formula 3 Euro Series; British F3; British Formula Ford

Stephen David Jelley (born 12 May 1982) is a British racing driver currently competing in the Porsche Carrera Cup GB for XQS Team Parker Racing.

== Career ==
=== Single-seaters ===
Born in Leicester, Jelley moved up from Formula Ford to the National Class of the British Formula 3 Championship for 2004, taking three class wins. In 2006 and 2007 he drove for Räikkönen Robertson Racing in British F3. After a second place in the 2007 opening round, he took two wins and finished 3rd overall. He contested the 2008 GP2 Asia Series season for the ART Grand Prix team.

=== Touring cars ===
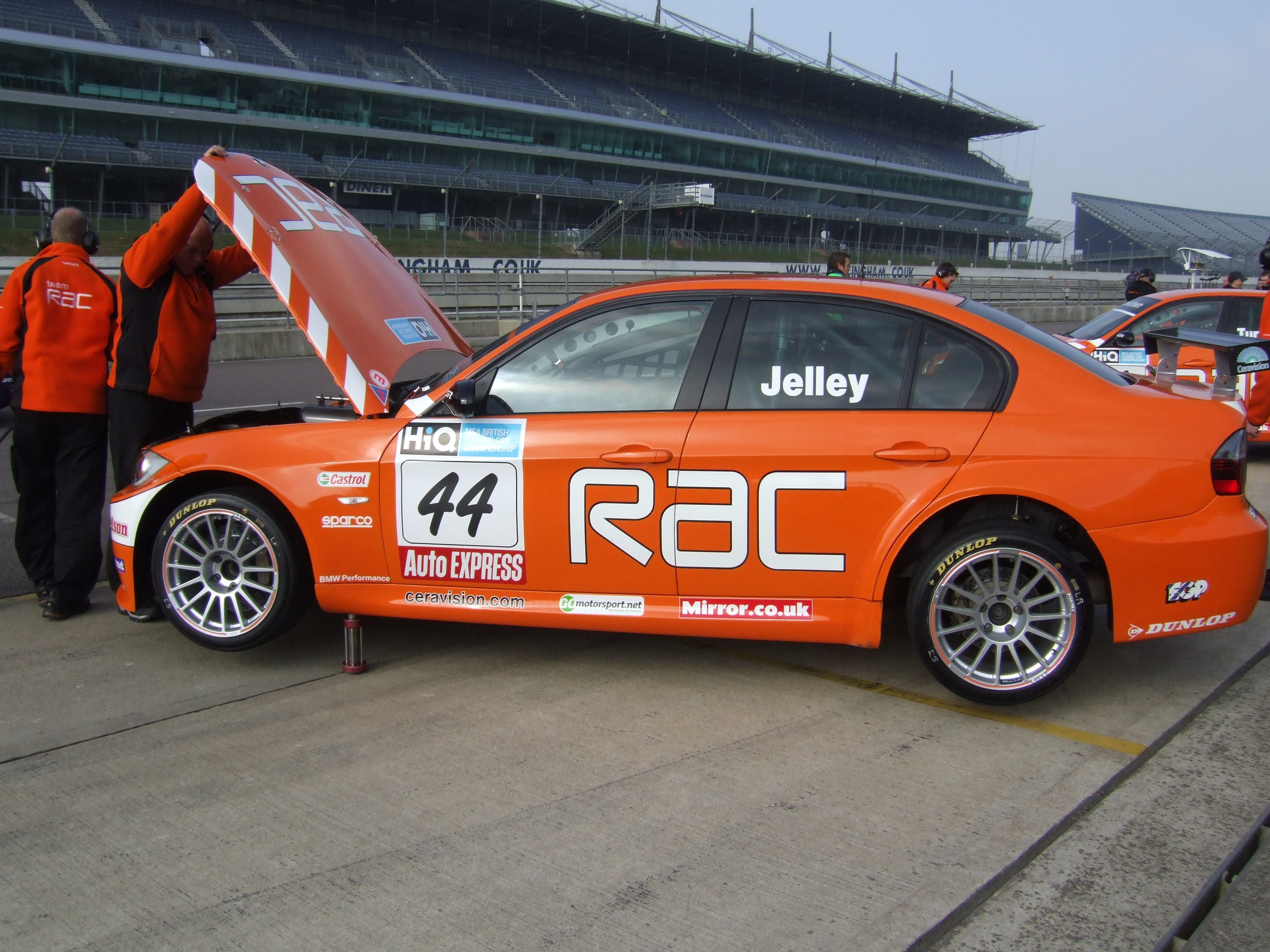
Jelley's 2009-spec BMW 320si at Rockingham.

Jelley switched to touring cars after his GP2 Asia campaign contesting the 2008 British Touring Car Championship with Team RAC as Colin Turkington's team-mate. His last GP2 Asia weekend clashed with the second BTCC meeting of the year at Rockingham meaning a GP2 race in Dubai on the Friday and BTCC qualifying at Rockingham on the Saturday. Early results were not impressive, with only one point in the first four meetings, results gradually improved with points finishes in each of the next three meetings, At Silverstone, he qualified seventh, but after finishing there in round 25, he crashed in round 26, dislocating his shoulder. Despite this injury, he did contest round 27, finishing in the points. At the Brands Hatch season finale, he took pole position, although as he explained to ITV4, the team did not initially believe he had set the fastest time, and attributed seeing P1 on the screen to a timing error. In the race, his gearbox failed, but he fought back to score minor points in the final round. For 2009, he continued with Team RAC and showed he had benefited from a years knowledge by finishing fourth (a then personal best) at the first round at Brands Hatch. Results continued to improve and at the halfway point of the 2009 season, Jelley took two-second-place finishes and a third position in the third race at Croft to clinch his first podium finishes in the sport. This was followed up at Rockingham with two wins one in race 1 from a starting position of fourth and one in race three again from fourth.

=== Porsche Carrera Cup ===
Jelley switched to the British Porsche Carrera Cup for 2010, driving for Team Parker Racing. He had a consistent season, taking 11 podium finishes (including wins in the final two races), and finished third in the championship, behind Tim Harvey and Michael Caine, but ahead of his team-mates.

Jelley remained in the series with the same team for 2011, this was a late change as he had initially agreed to drive in the 2011 Le Mans Series. Jelley took pole position for the season's first two races at Brands Hatch, leading the first until a mistake (that he attributed to a slightly different braking performance of the new car) dropped him to third. He rectified this in the second event, winning from team mate Euan Hankey. Throughout the season, Jelley fought with the two SAS backed cars of James Sutton and Michael Meadows, they went into the final meeting of the year tied on points. A fuel pick up problem in qualifying resulted in a frustrating seventh and ninth positions, Jelley managed to race to fourth place before slight contact with the rear of Meadows's car resulted in a punctured radiator ending his championship chances. Over the year, Jelley recorded five wins. Jelley's overtaking performances through the year were praised by Autosport Magazine (17 Nov 2011) as he was seen to make more positions than any other driver.

=== Avon Tyres British GT Championship ===
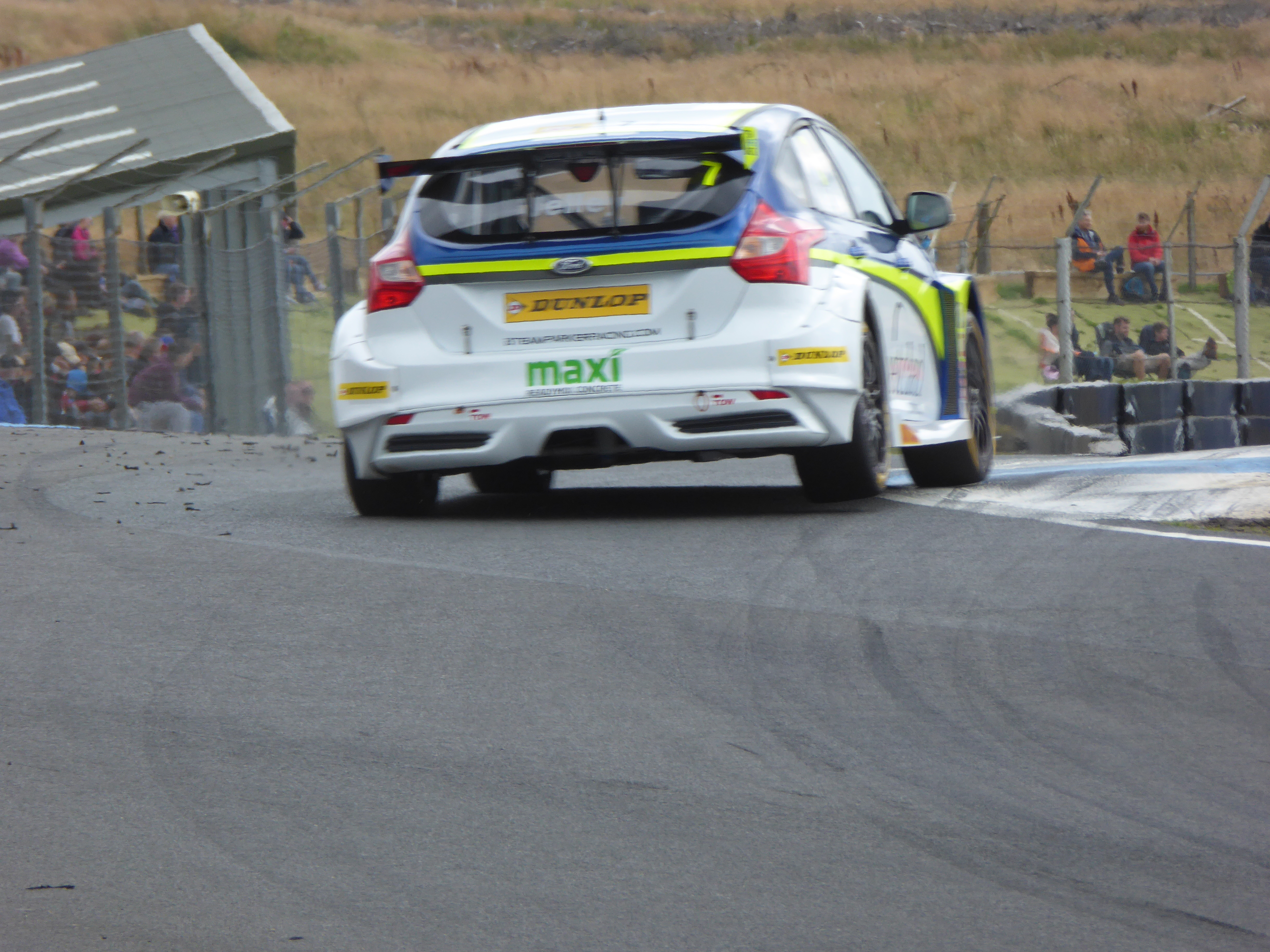
Jelley driving the Team Parker Racing Ford Focus ST at Knockhill during the 2017 British Touring Car Championship season.

As well as the 2011 Carrera Cup GB, Jelley competed in Two British GT Races for Trackspeed Racing at the wheel of a Porsche GT3R partnering David Ashburn. The pair also entered the International GT Open event at Brands Hatch. The highlight of these was Jelley setting Pole position for the British GT Donington 3-hour event, the pair finished fourth in the event. In 2012, Jelley competed in three rounds of the British GT Championship with Motorbase Performance driving a Porsche GT3R alongside businessman Steve Parish (Rockingham, Brands Hatch, and Donington.) He claimed pole position for the Rockingham and Brands Hatch rounds.

=== Blancpain Endurance Series ===
During 2012, Jelley drove for Von Ryan Racing in the Blancpain Endurance Series in a McLaren MP4-12C GT3 alongside brothers Matt and Julien Draper. This included the Spa 24h race.

=== Return to BTCC (2017–2023) ===
Following two years driving for Team Parker Racing in the Porsche Carrera Cup GB, Jelley returned to the British Touring Car Championship with the team driving a Ford Focus. The team struggled for pace and finished the season with only two points.

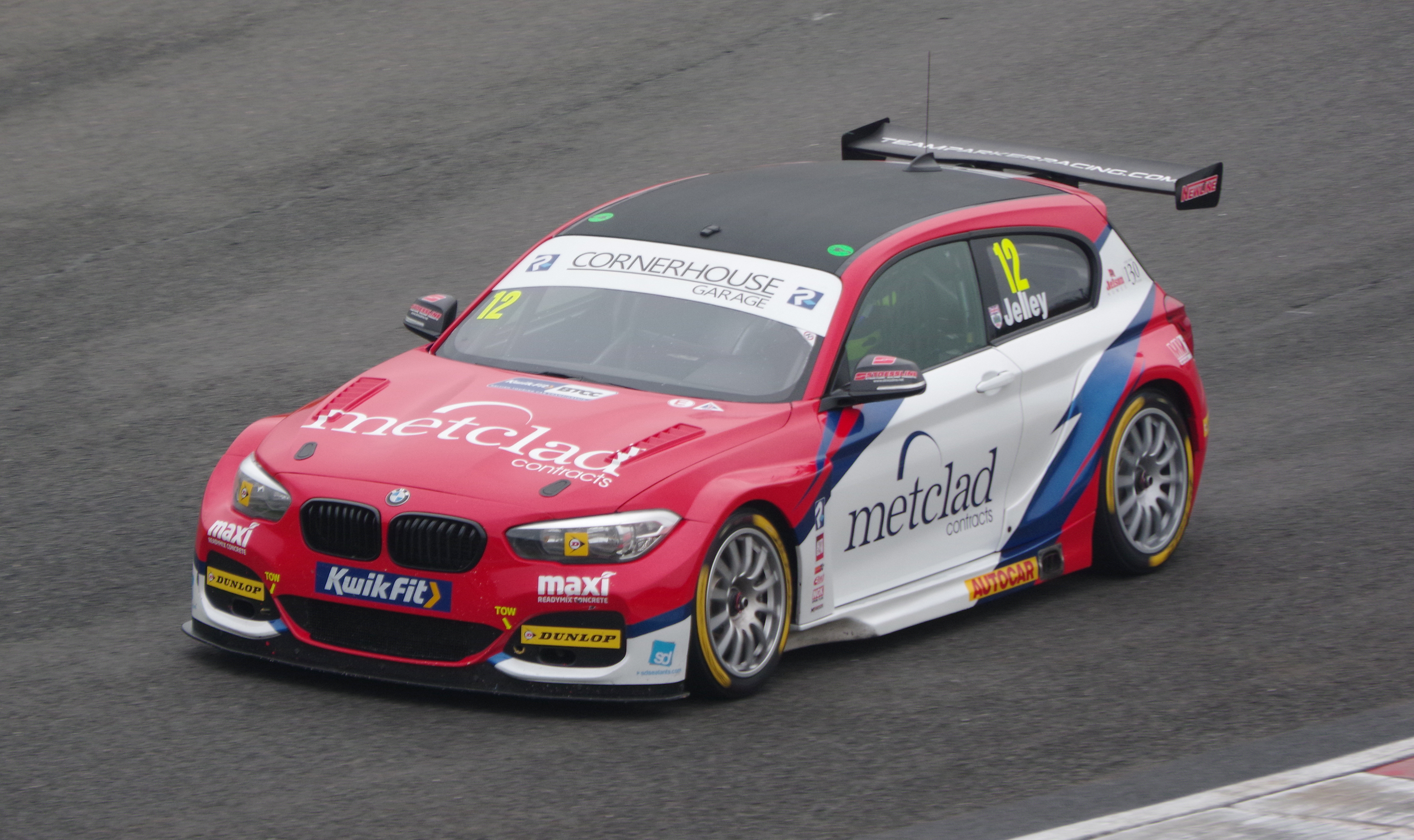
Jelley driving the Team Parker Racing BMW 125i at Brands Hatch during the 2019 British Touring Car Championship season.

For 2018, the team switched to an ex-WSR BMW 125i. The season was again a disappointment, with Jelley suffering bad luck on several occasions. His best meeting of the year was Knockhill, where he qualified second and was running in that position until getting punted by ex-teammate Colin Turkington.

Jelley remained with Team Parker and BMW for 2019. He immediately picked up his best result since his return to the championship, finishing on the podium in race 3 at Brands Hatch. At round 5, Jelley finished race 3 in second place on the road, but was promoted to first after a 20-second penalty was awarded to original winner Jake Hill.

Following the 2023 season, Jelley confirmed he would be departing West Surrey Racing.

=== Return to Porsche Carrera Cup ===
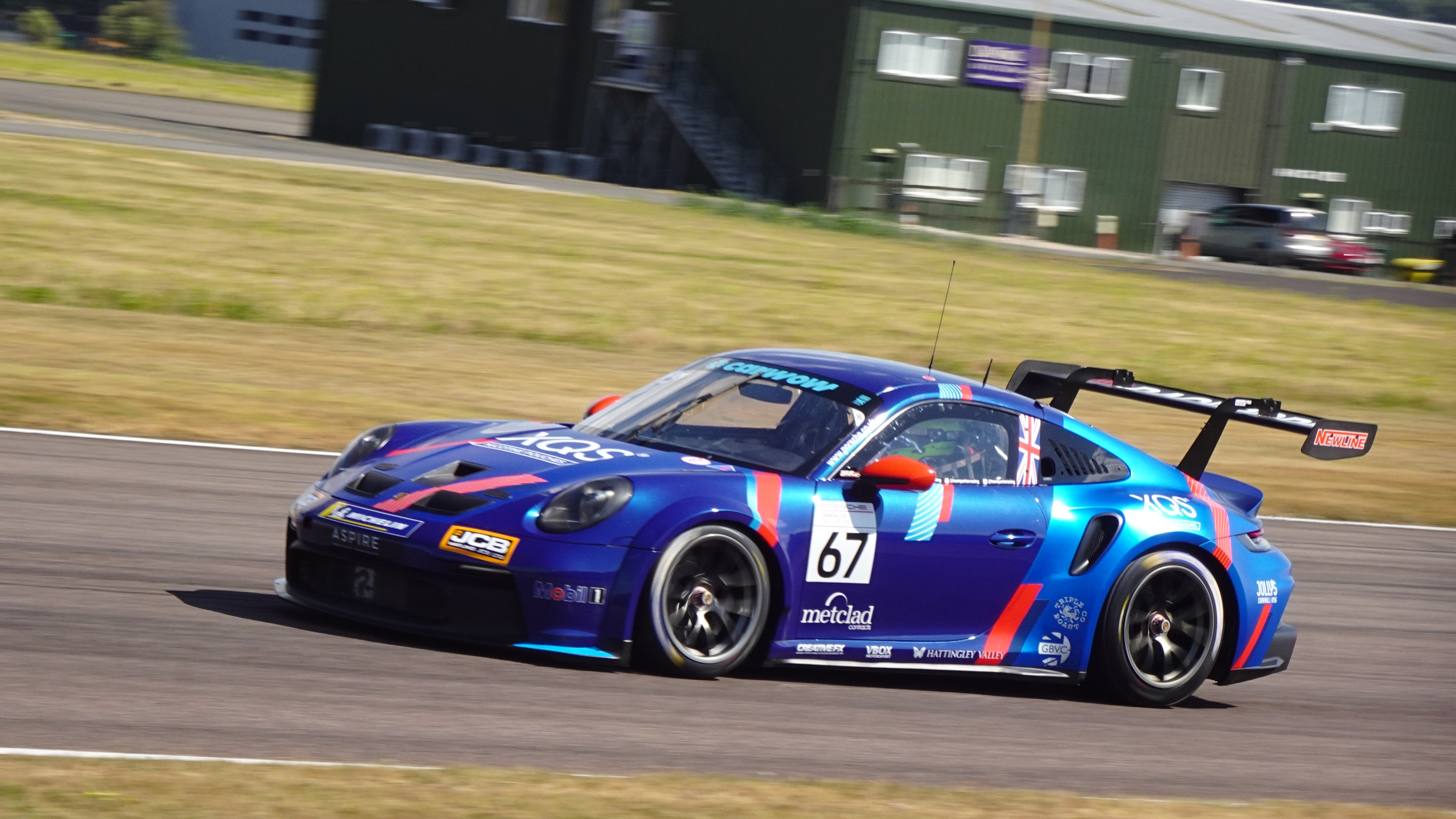
Jelley racing at Thruxton Circuit in the 2026 season

Ahead of the 2024 season, Jelley returned to the British Porsche Carrera Cup with Team Parker Racing.

=== Return to BTCC (2025–present) ===
Jelley is set to compete in 2025 British Touring Car Championship with One Motorsport, driving a Honda Civic Type-R alongside Josh Cook.

== Racing record ==
=== Complete British Formula Three Championship results ===
(key)

Year	Entrant	Chassis	Engine	Class	1	2	3	4	5	6	7	8	9	10	11	12	13	14	15	16	17	18	19	20	21	22	23	24	25	DC	Points
2004	Performance Racing Europe	Dallara F301	Opel	Scholarship	DON; 1; 20	DON; 2; 13	SIL; 1; 16	SIL; 2 C	CRO; 1; 14	CRO; 2; 14	KNO; 1 Ret	KNO; 2 Ret	**SNE**; **1** Ret	**SNE**; **2**; 13	**SNE**; **3**; 19	CAS; 1; 17	CAS; 2; 11	**DON**; **1**; 9	DON; 2; 13	OUL; 1 Ret	OUL; 2; 11	SIL; 1 Ret	**SIL**; **2**; 17	**THR**; **1**; 13	**THR**; **2**; 15	SPA; 1 DNS	SPA; 2; 19	BRH; 1; 13	BRH; 2; 15	2nd	266
2005	Menu F3 Motorsport	Dallara F305	Opel	Championship	DON; 1 Ret	DON; 2; 14	SPA; 1 C	SPA; 2 C	CRO; 1 Ret	CRO; 2; 16	KNO; 1; 11	KNO; 2 Ret	THR; 1; 13	THR; 2; 10	CAS; 1; 14	CAS; 2; 9	MNZ; 1; 16	MNZ; 2; 7	MNZ; 3; 8	SIL; 1; 8	SIL; 2; 11	SIL; 3; 10	NÜR; 1; 11	NÜR; 2; 19	MON; 1; 9	MON; 2; 13	SIL; 1; 8	SIL; 2; 11		12th	30
2006	Räikkönen Robertson Racing	Dallara F306	Mercedes HWA	Championship	OUL; 1; 2	OUL; 2; 11	DON; 1; 3	DON; 2 Ret	PAU; 1 Ret	PAU; 2; 9	MON; 1; 3	MON; 2; 12	SNE; 1; 7	SNE; 2; 4	SPA; 1; 11	SPA; 2; 8	SIL; 1; 7	SIL; 2; 13	BRH; 1; 5	BRH; 2; 8	MUG; 1; 2	MUG; 2; 9	SIL; 1; 6	SIL; 2; 16	THR; 1; 3	THR; 2; 5				7th	126
2007	Räikkönen Robertson Racing	Dallara F307	Mercedes	Championship	OUL; 1; 3	OUL; 2; 2	DON; 1; 2	DON; 2; 25	BUC; 1; 7	**BUC**; **2**; 3	SNE; 1; 4	SNE; 2; 5	MNZ; 1; 11	MNZ; 2; 18	BRH; 1; 2	BRH; 2; 6	**SPA**; **1**; 3	SPA; 2; 4	SIL; 1; 5	SIL; 2; 10	THR; 1; 1	THR; 2; 7	CRO; 1; 1	CRO; 2; 8	ROC; 1; 9	ROC; 2; 8				3rd	183

=== Complete Formula 3 Euro Series results ===
(key)

Year	Entrant	Chassis	Engine	1	2	3	4	5	6	7	8	9	10	11	12	13	14	15	16	17	18	19	20	DC	Points
2005	Team Midland Euroseries	Dallara F305/001	Toyota	HOC; 1	HOC; 2	PAU; 1	PAU; 2	SPA; 1	SPA; 2	MON; 1	MON; 2	OSC; 1	OSC; 2	NOR; 1	NOR; 2	NÜR; 1; 20	NÜR; 2; 16	ZAN; 1	ZAN; 2	LAU; 1	LAU; 2	HOC; 3	HOC; 4	NC	0

=== Complete GP2 Asia Series results ===
(key)

Year	Entrant	1	2	3	4	5	6	7	8	9	10	DC	Points
2008	ART Grand Prix	DUB1; FEA; 15	DUB1; SPR; 12	IDN; FEA; DSQ	IDN; SPR; Ret	MYS; FEA; Ret	MYS; SPR; 18	BHR; FEA; 16	BHR; SPR; 9	DUB2; FEA; 18	DUB2; SPR; DNS	24th	0

=== Complete British Touring Car Championship results ===
(key) (Races in bold indicate pole position – 1 point awarded in first race; races in italics indicate fastest lap – 1 point awarded all races; * signifies that driver lead race for at least one lap – 1 point given all races)

Year	Team	Car	1	2	3	4	5	6	7	8	9	10	11	12	13	14	15	16	17	18	19	20	21	22	23	24	25	26	27	28	29	30	Pos	Points
2008	Team RAC	BMW 320si	BRH; 1; 14	BRH; 2; 11	BRH; 3; 10	ROC; 1; 11	ROC; 2; 15	ROC; 3; 11	DON; 1 Ret	DON; 2 Ret	DON; 3; 13	THR; 1; 11	THR; 2; 11	THR; 3 Ret	CRO; 1 Ret	CRO; 2; 10	CRO; 3; 9	SNE; 1; 12	SNE; 2; 11	SNE; 3; 8	OUL; 1; 11	OUL; 2; 10	OUL; 3; 15	KNO; 1; 13	KNO; 2; 15	KNO; 3; 13	SIL; 1; 7	SIL; 2 Ret	SIL; 3; 10	**BRH**; **1** Ret	BRH; 2; 12	BRH; 3 Ret	15th	14
2009	Team RAC	BMW 320si	BRH; 1; 7	BRH; 2; 4	BRH; 3 Ret	THR; 1; 7	THR; 2; 4	THR; 3; 6	DON; 1 Ret	DON; 2 DNS	DON; 3 DNS	OUL; 1; 5	OUL; 2; 14	OUL; 3 Ret	CRO; 1; 2	CRO; 2; 2	CRO; 3; 3	SNE; 1; 6	SNE; 2; 13	SNE; 3 Ret	KNO; 1; 8	KNO; 2; 8	KNO; 3; 10	SIL; 1; 7	SIL; 2; 12	SIL; 3; 4	ROC; 1; 1*	**ROC**; **2**; 6*	ROC; 3; 1*	BRH; 1; 14	BRH; 2; 11	BRH; 3; 6	6th	137
2017	Team Parker Racing with Maximum Motorsport	Ford Focus ST	BRH; 1; 20	BRH; 2; 18	BRH; 3; 27	DON; 1; 20	DON; 2; 22	DON; 3; 19	THR; 1; 22	THR; 2; 22	THR; 3; 21	OUL; 1; 17	OUL; 2; 23	OUL; 3; 17	CRO; 1; 15	CRO; 2 Ret	CRO; 3 Ret	SNE; 1; 21	SNE; 2; 25	SNE; 3; 15	KNO; 1; 20	KNO; 2 Ret	KNO; 3; 21	ROC; 1; 26	ROC; 2; 22	ROC; 3 Ret	SIL; 1 Ret	SIL; 2; 26	SIL; 3 Ret	BRH; 1; 20	BRH; 2 DNS	BRH; 3; 19	34th	2
2018	Team Parker Racing	BMW 125i M Sport	BRH; 1; 22	BRH; 2 Ret	BRH; 3; 23	DON; 1; 30	DON; 2; 19	DON; 3; 17	THR; 1; 27	THR; 2; 25	THR; 3; 21	OUL; 1; 22	OUL; 2 Ret	OUL; 3; 16	CRO; 1 Ret	CRO; 2; 20	CRO; 3; 16	SNE; 1; 20	SNE; 2; 22	SNE; 3; 17	ROC; 1; 14	ROC; 2 Ret	ROC; 3; 16	KNO; 1 Ret	KNO; 2 Ret	KNO; 3; 14	SIL; 1 Ret	SIL; 2 Ret	SIL; 3 Ret	BRH; 1; 21	BRH; 2 Ret	BRH; 3 Ret	32nd	4
2019	Team Parker Racing	BMW 125i M Sport	BRH; 1; 7	BRH; 2; 6	BRH; 3; 3*	DON; 1; 17	DON; 2 Ret	DON; 3; 20	THR; 1; 13	THR; 2; 18	THR; 3; 12	CRO; 1; 14	CRO; 2; 12	CRO; 3; 28	OUL; 1; 11	OUL; 2; 6	OUL; 3; 1	SNE; 1; 25	SNE; 2 Ret	SNE; 3; 16	THR; 1; 19	THR; 2; 16	THR; 3; 23	KNO; 1 Ret	KNO; 2 Ret	KNO; 3; 17	SIL; 1 Ret	SIL; 2 Ret	SIL; 3; 23	BRH; 1; 7	BRH; 2; 10	BRH; 3; 11*	17th	105
2020	Team Parker Racing	BMW 125i M Sport	DON; 1; 9	DON; 2; 9	DON; 3; 18	BRH; 1; 9	BRH; 2; 9	BRH; 3; 3	OUL; 1; 20	OUL; 2; 20	OUL; 3 Ret	KNO; 1; 10	KNO; 2 Ret	KNO; 3; 13	THR; 1; 20	THR; 2; 17	THR; 3; 17	SIL; 1; 9	SIL; 2; 20	SIL; 3; 18	CRO; 1; 15	CRO; 2; 10	CRO; 3; 14	SNE; 1; 12	SNE; 2; 17	SNE; 3; 16	BRH; 1; 16	BRH; 2; 17	BRH; 3 Ret				16th	72
2021	Team BMW	BMW 330i M Sport	THR; 1 Ret	THR; 2; 11	**THR**; **3**; 10*	SNE; 1; 4	SNE; 2; 7	**SNE**; **3**; 5*	BRH; 1; 14	BRH; 2 Ret	BRH; 3; 22	OUL; 1; 5	OUL; 2; 7	OUL; 3; 2	KNO; 1; 11	KNO; 2; 9	**KNO**; **3**; 3*	THR; 1; 15	THR; 2; 14	THR; 3; 14	CRO; 1; 13	CRO; 2; 10	CRO; 3; 14	SIL; 1; 9	SIL; 2; 8	SIL; 3; 5	DON; 1; 15	DON; 2; 13	DON; 3; 9	BRH; 1; 23	BRH; 2; 9	**BRH**; **3**; 24*	12th	174
2022	Team BMW	BMW 330e M Sport	DON; 1; 7	DON; 2 DNS	DON; 3; 14	BRH; 1; 20	BRH; 2; 18	BRH; 3; 13	THR; 1; 9	THR; 2; 14	THR; 3; 16	OUL; 1; 11	OUL; 2; 12	**OUL**; **3**; 1*	CRO; 1; 11	CRO; 2; 10	CRO; 3; 4	KNO; 1; 4	KNO; 2; 8	KNO; 3; 7	SNE; 1; 5	SNE; 2; 5	SNE; 3; 21	THR; 1; 11	THR; 2; 11	**THR**; **3**; 3*	SIL; 1; 9	SIL; 2; 14	SIL; 3; 13	BRH; 1; 10	BRH; 2; 15	BRH; 3; 9	11th	181
2023	Team BMW	BMW 330e M Sport	DON; 1; 22	DON; 2; 4	DON; 3; 20	BRH; 1 Ret	BRH; 2 DNS	BRH; 3; 24	SNE; 1; 6	SNE; 2; 6	**SNE**; **3**; 6*	THR; 1; 19	THR; 2; 17	THR; 3; 16	OUL; 1; 10	OUL; 2; 18	OUL; 3; 13	CRO; 1; 8	CRO; 2; 7	CRO; 3 Ret	KNO; 1; 4	KNO; 2; 3	KNO; 3; 19	DON; 1; 19	DON; 2; 13	DON; 3; 10	SIL; 1; 19	SIL; 2; 18	SIL; 3; 13	BRH; 1; 8	BRH; 2; 9	**BRH**; **3**; 3*	12th	140
2025	One Motorsport	Honda Civic Type R	DON; 1; 20	DON; 2; 15	DON; 3; 17	BRH; 1; 14	BRH; 2; 13	BRH; 3; 19	SNE; 1 Ret	SNE; 2; 17	SNE; 3 Ret	THR; 1; 19	THR; 2; 16	THR; 3; 15	OUL; 1; 21	OUL; 2 NC	OUL; 3 Ret																24th	7
2025	ROKiT Racing with Un-Limited Motorsport	Cupra León																CRO; 1; 16	CRO; 2; 17	CRO; 3 Ret	KNO; 1	KNO; 2	KNO; 3	DON; 1	DON; 2	DON; 3	SIL; 1	SIL; 2	SIL; 3	BRH; 1	BRH; 2	BRH; 3	24th	7
