= James Sutton (racing driver) =

British racing driver (born 1985)

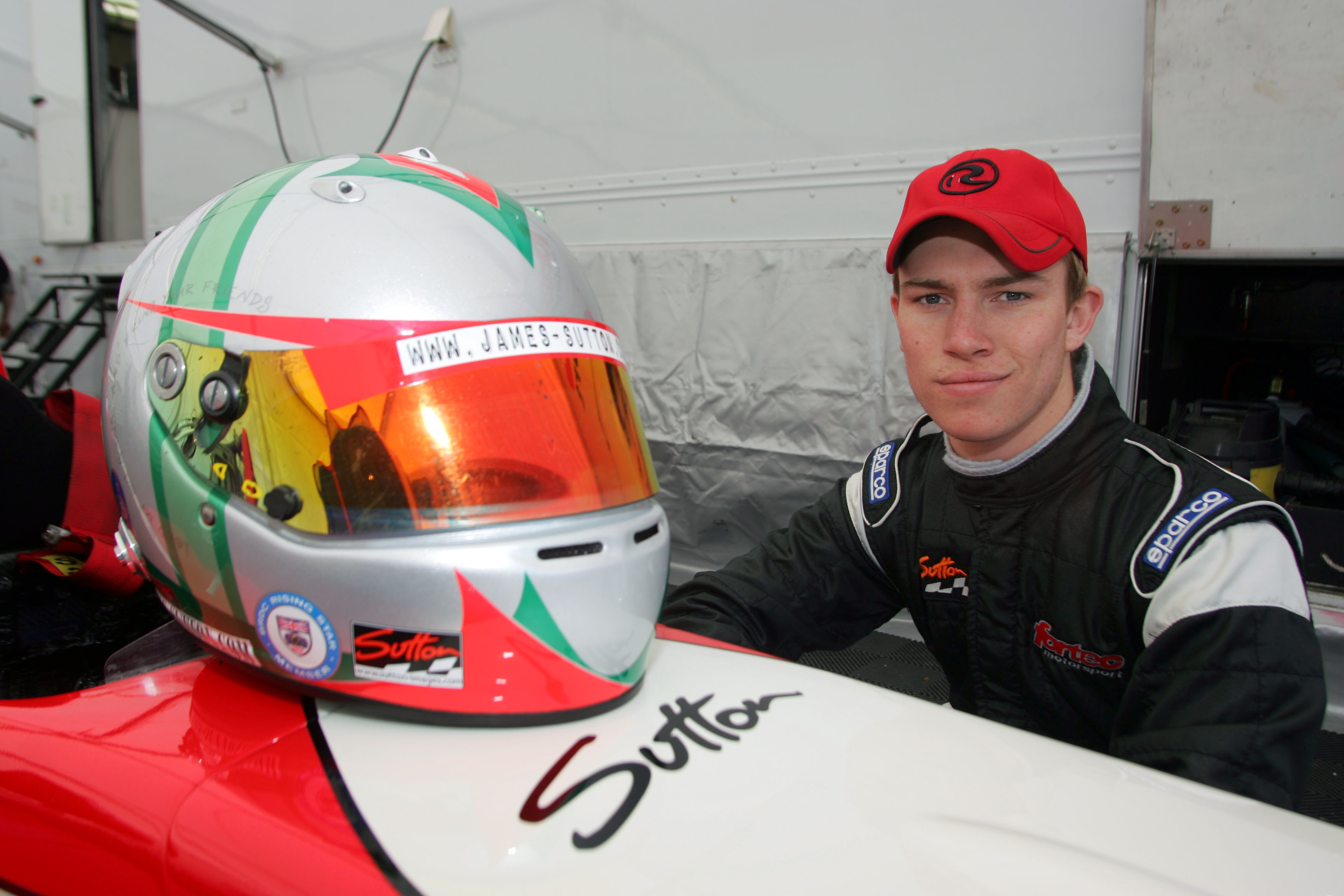
- James Sutton at Brands Hatch
- Nationality: British
- Born: 20 October 1985 (age 41)

Porsche Carrera Cup Great Britain career
- Debut season: 2007
- Current team: Redline Racing
- Car number: 1
- Starts: 60
- Wins: 15
- Poles: 10
- Fastest laps: 14
- Best finish: 1st in 2007, 2011

Previous series
- 2005–2006: Formula Renault

Championship titles
- 2007, 2011: Porsche Carrera Cup GB

James Sutton (born 20 October 1985 in London) is a racing driver. He won the 2007 Porsche Carrera Cup GB.

== Early years ==
Before he embarked on a career in cars, Sutton raced in karting, winning the London Cup in 2000 before becoming the Junior TKM British champion in 2001, before moving onto Formula ICA and in 2003 racing in the British Formula A karting championships.

== Single Seaters ==
Sutton's single-seater career began in 2004 where he won two races in the Formula BMW championships for the Fortec Motorsport team. In the same year, Sutton became an accepted member of the British Racing Drivers' Club (BRDC), as a 'Rising Star'. Sutton stayed with the team where he won his first Formula Renault race at the opening round of the 2006 Formula Renault UK series at Brands Hatch.

In 2005 and 2006, Sutton competed in the Formula Renault championships for Fortec,à winning the opening race of the 2006 season.

Sutton is campaigning for the introduction of guidelines, to be subjected to racing drivers involved in high speed racing crashes, that would regulate and control drivers competing and/or driving on the public highway.

== Porsche Carrera Cup Great Britain ==
In February 2007, it was announced that Sutton would compete in the Porsche Carrera Cup GB series for the 2007 season, with the Redline Racing team, which took Richard Westbrook to the championship in 2004 and took Danny Watts to ten wins out of the 20 races in 2006.

On 25 August 2007, Sutton was interviewed by Muriel Gray for the BBC Radio 4 show, Saturday Live, describing how he has tried to come to terms with having been responsible for a road death.

In October 2007, Sutton won the Porsche Carrera Cup GB championship in his debut season, making him the youngest driver to win the series. Having required only two sensible race finishes prior to the final weekend, Sutton was involved in a controversial penultimate race that opened the championship up to three drivers (himself, Steven Kane and Tim Harvey). Requiring only a third-place finish, Sutton, having started seventh on the grid, managed to the secure a podium finish and with that the overall title.

In November 2007, in an interview at the TOCA Awards ceremony, Sutton stated that an early retirement from motorsport had previously been contemplated at the end of the 2006 Formula Renault season. In an interview of the January 2008 edition of the 911 and Porsche World magazine, he stated that he chose to turn to sportscar racing when he was unable to raise the £400,000 needed to compete in F3. At this stage, he had no definite 2008 plans.

Sutton returned to the series in 2009, enjoying further success, and despite missing the first round of the championship, found himself challenging Harvey and Tim Bridgman for the title. A succession of double wins at Silverstone and Rockingham (boosted by non-finishes for both Tims in race 2 at Silverstone) left him four points behind Harvey and four ahead of Bridgman going into the final meeting at Brands Hatch.

Sutton went back to the Porsche Carrera Cup Championship in 2011 and following a hard-fought season against his teammate, Michael Meadows, won for the second time. Michael Meadows suffered a slow puncture in the last race at Brands Hatch which led to Sutton securing his title. Sutton is quoted saying "it was a very tough season and I consider this the biggest achievement of my career so far, based purely on the people I've had to compete against. To finally come away with the title feels fantastic. We had to work hard to make this year happen in the first place."

Sutton took a break from racing in 2012 before rejoining Redline in the Porsche Carrera Cup for the final three weekends of the 2012 championship replacing Glynn Geddie

== British GT ==
In February 2008, Sutton was announced as the fourth driver to be signed for the newly formed CR Scuderia. James partnered Michael Meadows for the whole of the 2008 British GT season.

Whilst competing in the British GT, Sutton also raced once in the Porsche Super Cup at Silverstone (starting 19th on the grid to finish fourth), and the Spa 24-hour race of the FIA GT championship (alongside Andrew Kirkaldy, Rob Bell and Dirk Müller in the CR Scuderia no. 56 car).

== Racing record ==
=== Complete Porsche Supercup results ===
(key) (Races in bold indicate pole position – 2 points awarded 2008 onwards in all races) (Races in italics indicate fastest lap)

Year	Team	1	2	3	4	5	6	7	8	9	10	11	12	13	DC	Points
2007	Porsche Cars Great Britain	BHR	BHR	ESP	MON	FRA	GBR; 12	GER	HUN	TUR	BEL	ITA			NC‡	0‡
2008	Veltins MRS Racing	BHR	BHR	ESP	TUR	MON	FRA	GBR; 4	GER	HUN	ESP	BEL	ITA		NC‡	0‡
2009	Porsche Cars Great Britain	BHR	BHR	ESP	MON	TUR	GBR; 3	GER	HUN	ESP	BEL	ITA	UAE; 9	UAE; 13	NC‡	0‡
2011	SAS International	TUR	ESP	MON	NNS	GBR; 11	GER	HUN	BEL	ITA	UAE	UAE			NC‡	0‡

‡ – Guest driver – Not eligible for points.

=== Complete British GT results ===
(key) (Races in bold indicate pole position) (Races in italics indicate fastest lap)

Year	Team	Car	Class	1	2	3	4	5	6	7	8	9	10	11	12	13	14	DC	Pts
2008	CR Scuderia	Ferrari F430 GT3	GT3	**OUL**; **1** DNS	OUL; 2; 2	KNO; 1 Ret	KNO; 2; 10	ROC; 1; 3	ROC; 2; 3	SNE; 1; 6	SNE; 2; 3	THR; 1; 9	THR; 2; 3	BRH; 1 Ret	BRH; 2; 13	SIL; 1	DON; Ret	9th	47

Sporting positions
Preceded by Damien Faulkner	Porsche Carrera Cup GB Champion; 2007	Succeeded by Tim Harvey
Preceded by Tim Harvey	Porsche Carrera Cup GB Champion; 2011	Succeeded by Michael Meadows
