= 2005 Porsche Carrera Cup Great Britain =

The 2005 Porsche Carrera Cup Great Britain was the third season of the one-make championship. It consisted of 20 rounds, beginning on 9 April at Donington Park and finishing on 2 October at Brands Hatch. The series supported the British Touring Car Championship throughout the season. Damien Faulkner claimed his first title, ahead of Richard Westbrook who had won the championship the previous year.

== Entry list ==
- All drivers raced in Porsche 911 GT3s.

Team	No	Driver	Rounds
Redline Racing	1	(United Kingdom) Richard Westbrook	1-3, 5-10
Redline Racing	5	(United Kingdom) Nigel Rice	All
Redline Racing	8	(United Kingdom) Jason Young	1-5, 7, 9-10
Redline Racing	9	(United Kingdom) Stephen Shanly	All
Team RPM	2	(United Kingdom) Tim Harvey	All
Team RPM	11	(United Kingdom) Steve Clark	All
Team RPM	12	(United States) Emmanuel Crouvisier	1
Team RPM	88	(Hong Kong) Paul Ip	9
Team RPM	96	(United Kingdom) Alex Mortimer	3
Team SAS	3	(United Kingdom) Jason Templeman	All
Team SAS	7	(Republic of Ireland) Damien Faulkner	All
Motorbase Performance	6	(United Kingdom) Andy Britnell	3-4, 10
Motorbase Performance	16	(United Kingdom) Sam Edwards	3
Motorbase Performance	16	(United Kingdom) Dave Pinkney	10
Motorbase Performance	17	(United Kingdom) Dave Bartrum	10
Motorbase Performance	18	(United Kingdom) Phil Quaife	10
Team Parker Racing	14	(Republic of Ireland) Michael Corridan	1, 5-10
Trackspeed	39	(United Kingdom) David Ashburn	1-3, 7-8, 10
Trackspeed	52	(United Kingdom) Rory Fordyce	1
Apex Tubulars	77	(United Kingdom) Jim Geddie	8
Guest
Porsche Cars GB	42	(United Kingdom) Dan Eagling	1
Porsche Cars GB	42	(United Kingdom) Jon Barnes	2
Porsche Cars GB	42	(United Kingdom) Susie Stoddart	3
Porsche Cars GB	42	(United Kingdom) Adam Fleetwood	4
Porsche Cars GB	42	(United Kingdom) Richard Lambert	5
Porsche Cars GB	42	(United Kingdom) Joey Foster	6
Porsche Cars GB	42	(United Kingdom) Jeremy Clark	7
Porsche Cars GB	42	(United Kingdom) Gordon Shedden	8
Porsche Cars GB	42	(United Kingdom) Scott Mansell	9
Porsche Cars GB	42	(United Kingdom) Tim Bridgman	10

== Calendar & Winners ==
Round		Venue	Date	Pole position	Fastest lap	Winning driver	Winning team
1	R1	Donington Park, Leicestershire	9–10 April	(United Kingdom) Richard Westbrook	(United Kingdom) Tim Harvey	(United Kingdom) Richard Westbrook	Redline Racing
1	R2	Donington Park, Leicestershire	9–10 April		(United Kingdom) Richard Westbrook	(United Kingdom) Richard Westbrook	Redline Racing
2	R3	Thruxton Circuit, Hampshire	30 April-1 May	(United Kingdom) Jason Templeman	(United Kingdom) Richard Westbrook	(United Kingdom) Richard Westbrook	Redline Racing
2	R4	Thruxton Circuit, Hampshire	30 April-1 May		(United Kingdom) Richard Westbrook	(United Kingdom) Richard Westbrook	Redline Racing
3	R5	Brands Hatch Indy, Kent	4–5 June	(United Kingdom) Richard Westbrook	(United Kingdom) Tim Harvey	(United Kingdom) Richard Westbrook	Redline Racing
3	R6	Brands Hatch Indy, Kent	4–5 June		(United Kingdom) Richard Westbrook	(United Kingdom) Richard Westbrook	Redline Racing
4	R7	Oulton Park, Cheshire	18–19 June	(Republic of Ireland) Damien Faulkner	(Republic of Ireland) Damien Faulkner	(Republic of Ireland) Damien Faulkner	Team SAS
4	R8	Oulton Park, Cheshire	18–19 June	Race postponed due to adverse weather conditions. Run at Mondello Park.			
5	R9	Croft Circuit, North Yorkshire	16–17 July	(United Kingdom) Richard Westbrook	(United Kingdom) Richard Westbrook	(United Kingdom) Richard Westbrook	Redline Racing
5	R10	Croft Circuit, North Yorkshire	16–17 July		(United Kingdom) Richard Westbrook	(United Kingdom) Richard Westbrook	Redline Racing
6	R8	Mondello Park, County Kildare	23–24 July		(Republic of Ireland) Damien Faulkner	(Republic of Ireland) Damien Faulkner	Team SAS
6	R11	Mondello Park, County Kildare	23–24 July	(United Kingdom) Richard Westbrook	(United Kingdom) Richard Westbrook	(Republic of Ireland) Damien Faulkner	Team SAS
6	R12	Mondello Park, County Kildare	23–24 July		(Republic of Ireland) Damien Faulkner	(Republic of Ireland) Damien Faulkner	Team SAS
7	R13	Snetterton Motor Racing Circuit, Norfolk	6–7 August	(United Kingdom) Richard Westbrook	(Republic of Ireland) Damien Faulkner	(Republic of Ireland) Damien Faulkner	Team SAS
7	R14	Snetterton Motor Racing Circuit, Norfolk	6–7 August		(United Kingdom) Richard Westbrook	(Republic of Ireland) Damien Faulkner	Team SAS
8	R15	Knockhill Racing Circuit, Fife	27–28 August	(United Kingdom) Richard Westbrook	(United Kingdom) Richard Westbrook	(United Kingdom) Richard Westbrook	Redline Racing
8	R16	Knockhill Racing Circuit, Fife	27–28 August		(United Kingdom) Tim Harvey	(United Kingdom) Richard Westbrook	Redline Racing
9	R17	Silverstone Circuit, Northamptonshire	17–18 September	(United Kingdom) Richard Westbrook	(Republic of Ireland) Damien Faulkner	(United Kingdom) Richard Westbrook	Redline Racing
9	R18	Silverstone Circuit, Northamptonshire	17–18 September		(United Kingdom) Richard Westbrook	(United Kingdom) Richard Westbrook	Redline Racing
10	R19	Brands Hatch GP, Kent	1–2 October	(United Kingdom) Richard Westbrook	(United Kingdom) Richard Westbrook	(United Kingdom) Richard Westbrook	Redline Racing
10	R20	Brands Hatch GP, Kent	1–2 October		(Republic of Ireland) Damien Faulkner	(United Kingdom) Richard Westbrook	Redline Racing

== Championship Standings ==
Points were awarded on a 20, 18, 16, 14, 12, 10, 9, 8, 7, 6, 5, 4, 3, 2, 1 basis to the top 15 finishers in each race, with 1 point for the fastest lap in each race and 1 point for pole position in the first race of each meeting.

Pos	Driver	DON		THR		BRA		OUL		CRO		MON			SNE		KNO		SIL		BRA		Pts
1	(Republic of Ireland) Damien Faulkner	3	3	2	2	2	2	**1**	**C**	3	2	**1**	1	**1**	1	**1**	2	4	2	**2**	3	2	371
2	(United Kingdom) Richard Westbrook	**1**	**1**	1	**1**	**1**	**1**			**1**	**1**		**Ret**	3	**DSQ**	2	**1**	**1**	**1**	1	**1**	**1**	331
3	(United Kingdom) Jason Templeman	4	4	**9**	8	3	3	2	C	4	4	2	3	6	3	4	6	6	3	Ret	2	3	274
4	(United Kingdom) Tim Harvey	2	2	8	3	Ret	Ret	7	C	2	3	3	2	2	2	3	4	3	4	DSQ	4	Ret	256
5	(United Kingdom) Nigel Rice	6	5	4	4	9	10	5	C	5	7	5	5	4	4	Ret	5	5	7	4	7	Ret	217
6	(United Kingdom) Stephen Shanly	10	7	5	Ret	Ret	6	3	C	6	5	4	6	7	6	5	7	7	5	Ret	Ret	7	176
7	(United Kingdom) Steve Clark	Ret	10	7	6	Ret	9	Ret	C	7	8	6	7	8	7	6	9	10	6	6	8	8	155
8	(United Kingdom) Jason Young	7	6	3	5	4	8	DSQ	C	DNS	DNS				5	7			9	5	6	5	138
9	(Republic of Ireland) Michael Corridan	11	11							9	9		8	9	10	9	11	Ret	11	7	12	10	92
10	(United Kingdom) David Ashburn	9	Ret	Ret	9	10	11								9	8	8	8			11	9	70
11	(United Kingdom) Andy Britnell					5	4	4	C												10	6	58
12	(United Kingdom) Sam Edwards					6	5																22
13	(United States) Emmanuel Crouvisier	8	8																				17
14	(United Kingdom) Jim Geddie																10	9					15
15	(United Kingdom) Dave Pinkney																				5	Ret	12
16	(United Kingdom) Alex Mortimer					8	DNS																9
17	(United Kingdom) Phil Quaife																				9	Ret	7
18	(Hong Kong) Paul Ip																		10	Ret			7
NC	(United Kingdom) Rory Fordyce	DNS	Ret																				0
NC	(United Kingdom) Dave Bartrum																				DNS	DNS	0
guest drivers ineligible for points
	(United Kingdom) Gordon Shedden																3	2					0
	(United Kingdom) Scott Mansell																		8	3			0
	(United Kingdom) Joey Foster												4	5									0
	(United Kingdom) Tim Bridgman																				Ret	4	0
	(United Kingdom) Dan Eagling	5	9																				0
	(United Kingdom) Jon Barnes			6	7																		0
	(United Kingdom) Richard Lambert									8	6												0
	(United Kingdom) Adam Fleetwood							6	C														0
	(United Kingdom) Susie Stoddart					7	7																0
	(United Kingdom) Jeremy Clark														8	Ret							0
Pos	Driver	DON		THR		BRA		OUL		CRO		MON			SNE		KNO		SIL		BRA		Pts

Colour	Result
Gold	Winner
Silver	Second place
Bronze	Third place
Green	Points classification
Blue	Non-points classification
Blue	Non-classified finish (NC)
Purple	Retired, not classified (Ret)
Red	Did not qualify (DNQ)
Red	Did not pre-qualify (DNPQ)
Black	Disqualified (DSQ)
White	Did not start (DNS)
White	Withdrew (WD)
White	Race cancelled (C)
Blank	Did not practice (DNP)
Blank	Did not arrive (DNA)
Blank	Excluded (EX)

**Bold** – Pole
Italics – Fastest Lap
