= 2008 Porsche Carrera Cup Great Britain =

The 2008 Porsche Carrera Cup Great Britain was the sixth season of the one-make championship. It consisted of 20 rounds, beginning on 29 March at Brands Hatch and finishing on 21 September at the same venue. The series supported the British Touring Car Championship throughout the season. Tim Harvey claimed his first title, having finished as runner-up to Richard Westbrook in 2004, Damien Faulkner in 2006 and James Sutton in 2007, Michael Caine finished the season as runner-up. Other front runners throughout the season were Sam Hancock, Tim Bridgman and Phil Quaife. Guest drivers Stefan Hodgetts, son of former British Touring Car champion Chris, and Nick Tandy were also victorious. Former BTCC race winner Paul O'Neill was another notable guest driver.

== Entry list ==
- All drivers raced in Porsche 911 GT3s.

Team	No	Driver	Rounds
Redline Racing	2	(United Kingdom) Tim Harvey	All
Team Jota	5	(United Kingdom) Sam Hancock	All
Team Jota	6	(United Kingdom) Phil Quaife	All
Team Parker Racing	7	(United Kingdom) Charles Bateman	All
Team Parker Racing	8	(United Kingdom) Tim Bridgman	All
Team Parker Racing	44	(United Kingdom) Michael Caine	All
Team Parker Racing	46	(United Kingdom) Sean Paul Breslin	9
Team Eurotech	10	(United Kingdom) Pippa Mann	7–8, 10
Team RPM	12	(United Kingdom) Alex Mortimer	7
Pro-Am 1
Redline Racing	15	(United Kingdom) Nigel Rice	All
Redline Racing	31	(United Kingdom) Fergus Campbell	1–2
Redline Racing	31	(United Kingdom) Andy Neate	6
Redline Racing	31	(United Kingdom) Ray MacDowall	10
Team RPM	18	(United Kingdom) Nick Whale	3
ReDesign Racing	34	(United Kingdom) Tony Gilham	All
Pro-Am 2
Apex Tubulars	10	(United Kingdom) Bob Lyons	5
Apex Tubulars	79	(United Kingdom) Bob Lyons	8
RSS Performance	13	(United Kingdom) George Mackintosh	6
RSS Performance	40	(Republic of Ireland) Karl Leonard	7
RSS Performance	41	(Republic of Ireland) Michael Leonard	10
RSS Performance	42	(United Kingdom) Graeme Mundy	6–10
Parr Motorsport	23	(United Kingdom) Robin Clark	6, 9–10
Parr Motorsport	24	(United Kingdom) Steve Rance	6, 9
Parr Motorsport	78	(United Kingdom) Glynn Geddie	6–10
Ken Bolger Motorsport	41	(Republic of Ireland) Michael Leonard	7
In2Racing	50	(United Kingdom) Paul Hogarth	9–10
Qserv	56	(United Kingdom) Tommy Dreelan	5–6, 8–10
Qserv	79	(United Kingdom) Alasdair McCaig	9
Guest
Geek Squad	43	(United States) Jake Rosenzweig	6–7
Team Parker Racing	43	(United States) Jake Rosenzweig	10
Porsche Motorsport	45	(United Kingdom) Steve Rance	1
Porsche Motorsport	45	(United Kingdom) John Stack	2
Porsche Motorsport	45	(United Kingdom) John Quartermaine	3
Porsche Motorsport	45	(United Kingdom) Matt Blyth	4
Porsche Motorsport	45	(United Kingdom) Glynn Geddie	5
Porsche Motorsport	45	(United Kingdom) Sarah Franklin	6
Porsche Motorsport	45	(United Kingdom) Ed Pead	7
Porsche Motorsport	45	(United Kingdom) Rory Butcher	8
Porsche Motorsport	45	(United Kingdom) Mark McAleer	9
Porsche Motorsport	45	(United Kingdom) Ollie Jackson	10
Porsche Motorsport	60	(United Kingdom) Andy Britnell	1
Porsche Motorsport	60	(United Kingdom) Dean Smith	2
Porsche Motorsport	60	(United Kingdom) Callum MacLeod	3
Porsche Motorsport	60	(United Kingdom) Duncan Tappy	4
Porsche Motorsport	60	(United Kingdom) Stefan Hodgetts	5
Porsche Motorsport	60	(United Kingdom) Jack Clarke	6
Porsche Motorsport	60	(United Kingdom) Paul O'Neill	7
Porsche Motorsport	60	(United Kingdom) Ben Anderson	8
Porsche Motorsport	60	(United Kingdom) Nick Tandy	9

== Race results ==
All races were held in the United Kingdom.

Round		Venue	Date	Pole position	Fastest lap	Winning driver	Winning team
1	R1	Brands Hatch Indy, Kent	29 March	(United Kingdom) Tim Bridgman	(United Kingdom) Michael Caine	(United Kingdom) Michael Caine	Team Parker Racing
1	R2	Brands Hatch Indy, Kent	30 March	(United Kingdom) Tim Bridgman	(United Kingdom) Michael Caine	(United Kingdom) Michael Caine	Team Parker Racing
2	R3	Rockingham Motor Speedway, Northamptonshire	13 April	(United Kingdom) Tim Bridgman	(United Kingdom) Tim Bridgman	(United Kingdom) Tim Bridgman	Team Parker Racing
2	R4	Rockingham Motor Speedway, Northamptonshire	13 April	(United Kingdom) Tim Bridgman	(United Kingdom) Dean Smith	(United Kingdom) Tim Bridgman	Team Parker Racing
3	R5	Donington Park, Lancashire	3 May	(United Kingdom) Tim Bridgman	(United Kingdom) Tim Harvey	(United Kingdom) Tim Bridgman	Team Parker Racing
3	R6	Donington Park, Lancashire	3 May	(United Kingdom) Tim Bridgman	(United Kingdom) Phil Quaife	(United Kingdom) Tim Bridgman	Team Parker Racing
4	R7	Thruxton Circuit, Hampshire	17 May	(United Kingdom) Michael Caine	(United Kingdom) Michael Caine	(United Kingdom) Sam Hancock	Team Jota
4	R8	Thruxton Circuit, Hampshire	18 May	(United Kingdom) Michael Caine	(United Kingdom) Tim Harvey	(United Kingdom) Sam Hancock	Team Jota
5	R9	Croft Circuit, North Yorkshire	31 May	(United Kingdom) Tim Harvey	(United Kingdom) Tim Harvey	(United Kingdom) Tim Bridgman	Team Parker Racing
5	R10	Croft Circuit, North Yorkshire	1 June	(United Kingdom) Tim Harvey	(United Kingdom) Stefan Hodgetts	(United Kingdom) Stefan Hodgetts	Porsche Motorsport
6	R11	Snetterton Motor Racing Circuit, Norfolk	13 July	(United Kingdom) Sam Hancock	(United Kingdom) Tim Bridgman	(United Kingdom) Tim Harvey	Redline Racing
6	R12	Snetterton Motor Racing Circuit, Norfolk	13 July	(United Kingdom) Tim Harvey	(United Kingdom) Tim Harvey	(United Kingdom) Tim Harvey	Redline Racing
7	R13	Oulton Park, Cheshire	26 July	(United Kingdom) Michael Caine	(United Kingdom) Michael Caine	(United Kingdom) Michael Caine	Team Parker Racing
7	R14	Oulton Park, Cheshire	27 July	(United Kingdom) Michael Caine	(United Kingdom) Michael Caine	(United Kingdom) Michael Caine	Team Parker Racing
8	R15	Knockhill Racing Circuit, Fife	17 August	(United Kingdom) Sam Hancock	(United Kingdom) Tim Harvey	(United Kingdom) Tim Bridgman	Team Parker Racing
8	R16	Knockhill Racing Circuit, Fife	17 August	(United Kingdom) Sam Hancock	(United Kingdom) Michael Caine	(United Kingdom) Sam Hancock	Team Jota
9	R17	Silverstone Circuit, Northamptonshire	31 August	(United Kingdom) Phil Quaife	(United Kingdom) Tim Bridgman	(United Kingdom) Nick Tandy	Porsche Motorsport
9	R18	Silverstone Circuit, Northamptonshire	31 August	(United Kingdom) Phil Quaife	(United Kingdom) Sam Hancock	(United Kingdom) Tim Harvey	Redline Racing
10	R19	Brands Hatch Indy, Kent	20 September	(United Kingdom) Tim Bridgman	(United States) Jake Rosenzweig	(United Kingdom) Tim Harvey	Redline Racing
10	R20	Brands Hatch Indy, Kent	21 September	(United Kingdom) Tim Bridgman	(United Kingdom) Tim Bridgman	(United Kingdom) Tim Bridgman	Team Parker Racing

== Championship standings ==
Pos	Driver	BHI		ROC		DON		THR		CRO		SNE		OUL		KNO		SIL		BHI		Pts
1	(United Kingdom) Tim Harvey	2	2	2	2	2	6	3	Ret	**3**	**3**	1	1	2	3	4	3	2	1	1	2	340
2	(United Kingdom) Michael Caine	1	1	3	3	3	2	**5**	**4**	5	2	5	3	1	1	6	6	5	4	2	3	328
3	(United Kingdom) Sam Hancock	Ret	4	5	4	4	5	1	1	4	8	**2**	**4**	4	Ret	**2**	**1**	3	3	3	4	282
4	(United Kingdom) Tim Bridgman	**Ret**	**Ret**	**1**	**1**	**1**	**1**	2	2	1	7	11	2	3	2	1	2	Ret	9	**DNS**	**1**	273
5	(United Kingdom) Phil Quaife	4	3	DNS	5	6	3	4	5	6	4	3	9	7	13	3	4	**4**	**2**	5	5	257
6	(United Kingdom) Tony Gilham	6	9	7	9	8	8	8	6	10	9	Ret	7	10	8	9	7	8	8	8	9	173
7	(United Kingdom) Nigel Rice	Ret	5	8	7	7	7	7	Ret	8	Ret	6	Ret	9	6	7	9	6	6	6	7	162
8	(United Kingdom) Charles Bateman	7	6	6	8	10	4	Ret	3	7	6	9	Ret	5	4	Ret	DNS	Ret	Ret	7	8	159
9	(United Kingdom) Glynn Geddie									9	5	4	Ret	Ret	10	9	8	9	5	10	Ret	66
10	(United Kingdom) Graeme Mundy											Ret	6	13	12	DNS	11	13	14	12	12	46
11	(United Kingdom) Tommy Dreelan									12	11	14	11			13	13	15	15	13	14	46
12	(United Kingdom) Steve Rance	5	10									12	8					11	7			30
13	(United Kingdom) Fergus Campbell	8	8	9	Ret																	27
14	(United Kingdom) Paul Hogarth																	10	10	11	11	26
15	(United Kingdom) Bob Lyons									11	10					12	12					26
16	(United Kingdom) Robin Clark											16	12					16	16	14	15	18
17	(United Kingdom) Pippa Mann													Ret	11	10	9			Ret	Ret	15
18	(Republic of Ireland) Michael Leonard													12	Ret					9	Ret	14
19	(United Kingdom) George Mackintosh											13	10									12
20	(United Kingdom) Sean Paul Breslin																	7	Ret			10
21	(Republic of Ireland) Karl Leonard													Ret	7							10
22	(United Kingdom) Alasdair McCaig																	12	13			10
23	(United Kingdom) Nick Whale					9	Ret															8
24	(United Kingdom) Andy Neate											10	Ret									8
25	(United Kingdom) Ray MacDowall																			Ret	13	5
26	(United Kingdom) Alex Mortimer													11	DNS							1
guest drivers ineligible for points
	(United Kingdom) Stefan Hodgetts									2	1											0
	(United Kingdom) Nick Tandy																	1	11			0
	(United Kingdom) Andy Britnell	3	7																			0
	(United States) Jake Rosenzweig											8	5	8	9					4	6	0
	(United Kingdom) Dean Smith			4	6																	0
	(United Kingdom) Rory Butcher															5	5					0
	(United Kingdom) Callum MacLeod					5	Ret															0
	(United Kingdom) Ed Pead													Ret	5							0
	(United Kingdom) Matt Blyth							6	7													0
	(United Kingdom) Paul O'Neill													6	Ret							0
	(United Kingdom) Jack Clarke											7	Ret									0
	(United Kingdom) John Quartermaine					11	9															0
	(United Kingdom) Duncan Tappy							9	Ret													0
	(United Kingdom) John Stack			10	10																	0
	(United Kingdom) Ollie Jackson																			Ret	10	0
	(United Kingdom) Mark McAleer																	14	12			0
	(United Kingdom) Ben Anderson															11	Ret					0
	(United Kingdom) Sarah Franklin											15	Ret									0
Pos	Driver	BHI		ROC		DON		THR		CRO		SNE		OUL		KNO		SIL		BHI		Pts

Colour	Result
Gold	Winner
Silver	Second place
Bronze	Third place
Green	Points classification
Blue	Non-points classification
Blue	Non-classified finish (NC)
Purple	Retired, not classified (Ret)
Red	Did not qualify (DNQ)
Red	Did not pre-qualify (DNPQ)
Black	Disqualified (DSQ)
White	Did not start (DNS)
White	Withdrew (WD)
White	Race cancelled (C)
Blank	Did not practice (DNP)
Blank	Did not arrive (DNA)
Blank	Excluded (EX)

**Bold** – Pole
Italics – Fastest Lap
