= 2010 Porsche Carrera Cup Great Britain =

The 2010 Porsche Carrera Cup Great Britain was the eighth season of the Porsche Carrera Cup Great Britain series. The series again featured on the same package as the British Touring Car Championship, and as such benefited from live coverage at each round on ITV4 in the United Kingdom.

Reigning champion Tim Bridgman will not be back to defend his title in 2010 as he will be taking part in the Porsche Supercup. 2008 Champion Tim Harvey has announced his intention to return to the series for another year after losing out on the championship in 2009.

== Entry list ==
On 17 March 2010, the championship was officially launched at Silverstone, with the organisers unveiling a capacity entry list of 28 cars.

- All drivers race in Porsche 911 GT3s.

Team	No.	Driver	Rounds
Redline Racing	3	(United Kingdom) Tim Harvey	All
Redline Racing	9	(United Kingdom) Michael Meadows	All
Team Parker Racing	7	(United Kingdom) Glynn Geddie	All
Team Parker Racing	16	(United Kingdom) Euan Hankey	All
Team Parker Racing	70	(United Kingdom) Stephen Jelley	All
GT Marques	30	(United Kingdom) Robbie Kerr	7
JHR	43	(United Kingdom) Tom Bradshaw	1–5, 9–10
Motorbase Performance	44	(United Kingdom) Michael Caine	All
Motorbase Performance	77	(United Kingdom) Charles Bateman	All
Pro-Am 1
Redline Racing	6	(United Kingdom) Andrew Shelley	1–7, 9–10
Redline Racing	18	(United Kingdom) Archie Hamilton	1–7
Redline Racing	23	(Oman) Ahmad Al Harthy	All
Juta Racing	8	(Lithuania) Jonas Gelžinis	All
Juta Racing	19	(Lithuania) Tautvydas Barštys	1–8, 10
Team Parker Racing	10	(Republic of Ireland) Michael Leonard	3, 6–7
Team Parker Racing	87	(United Kingdom) Alex Martin	6–8, 10
JHR	11	(Sweden) Martin Ohlin	7
JHR	36	(Republic of Ireland) Karl Leonard	8
Re-Design Racing	34	(United Kingdom) Tony Gilham	All
Motorbase Performance	48	(United Kingdom) Ollie Jackson	All
Motorbase Performance	66	(United Kingdom) Liam Griffin	All
Celtic Speed	68	(United Kingdom) Tommy Dreelan	All
Pro-Am 2
Motorbase Performance	4	(United Kingdom) Steve Parish	1–4, 9–10
Motorbase Performance	28	(United Kingdom) George Richardson	All
JHR	5	(United Kingdom) Mark Hazell	1–5, 7–10
Redline Racing	13	(United Kingdom) Glenn McMenamin	All
Parr Motorsport	15	(United Kingdom) Richard Denny	1–8
GT Marques	40	(United Kingdom) Paul Mace	1, 3–7, 10
GT Marques	87	(United Kingdom) Alex Martin	1–5
IN2Racing	50	(United Kingdom) Paul Hogarth	2
Celtic Speed	79	(United Kingdom) Bob Lyons	2–5, 7–10
Celtic Speed	99	(United Kingdom) George Brewster	All
Kinfaun Racing	81	(United Kingdom) John Gaw	4
Guest
Redline Racing	20	(Turkey) Yucel Ozbek	9
Redline Racing	60	(United Kingdom) James Sutton	7
Celtic Speed	45	(United Kingdom) Rory Butcher	8
Team Parker Racing	61	(United Kingdom) Mike Johnson	2
Team Parker Racing	62	(United Kingdom) Jeremy Clark	5

== Calendar ==
On 7 October 2009, the British Touring Car Championship announced the race calendar for the 2010 season for all of the series competing on the TOCA package. Each meeting will take place over a weekend. The Porsche Carrera Cup will feature Saturday races at the second meeting at Rockingham and the season finale at Brands Hatch. All other meetings will see the series race twice on Sunday. All races were held in the United Kingdom.

Round		Circuit	Date	Pole position	Fastest lap	Winning driver	Winning team
1	R1	Thruxton Circuit, Hampshire	4 April	(United Kingdom) Tim Harvey	(United Kingdom) Michael Caine	(United Kingdom) Tim Harvey	Redline Racing
1	R2	Thruxton Circuit, Hampshire	4 April	(United Kingdom) Tim Harvey	(United Kingdom) Michael Caine	(United Kingdom) Tim Harvey	Redline Racing
2	R3	Rockingham Motor Speedway, Northamptonshire	24 April	(United Kingdom) Tim Harvey	(United Kingdom) Tim Harvey	(United Kingdom) Tim Harvey	Redline Racing
2	R4	Rockingham Motor Speedway, Northamptonshire	25 April	(United Kingdom) Tim Harvey	(United Kingdom) Michael Caine	(United Kingdom) Tim Harvey	Redline Racing
3	R5	Brands Hatch (GP), Kent	2 May	(United Kingdom) Michael Caine	(United Kingdom) Tom Bradshaw	(United Kingdom) Michael Caine	Motorbase Performance
3	R6	Brands Hatch (GP), Kent	2 May	(United Kingdom) Tim Harvey	(United Kingdom) Tom Bradshaw	(United Kingdom) Tim Harvey	Redline Racing
4	R7	Oulton Park, Cheshire	6 June	(United Kingdom) Michael Caine	(United Kingdom) Tim Harvey	(United Kingdom) Tim Harvey	Redline Racing
4	R8	Oulton Park, Cheshire	6 June	(United Kingdom) Tim Harvey	(United Kingdom) Charles Bateman	(United Kingdom) Tim Harvey	Redline Racing
5	R9	Croft Circuit, North Yorkshire	20 June	(United Kingdom) Tim Harvey	(United Kingdom) Michael Caine	(United Kingdom) Tim Harvey	Redline Racing
5	R10	Croft Circuit, North Yorkshire	20 June	(United Kingdom) Euan Hankey	(United Kingdom) Tim Harvey	(United Kingdom) Tim Harvey	Redline Racing
6	R11	Snetterton Motor Racing Circuit, Norfolk	8 August	(United Kingdom) Michael Caine	(United Kingdom) Tim Harvey	(United Kingdom) Michael Caine	Motorbase Performance
6	R12	Snetterton Motor Racing Circuit, Norfolk	8 August	(United Kingdom) Tim Harvey	(United Kingdom) Stephen Jelley	(United Kingdom) Tim Harvey	Redline Racing
7	R13	Silverstone Circuit, Northamptonshire	22 August	(United Kingdom) Michael Caine	(United Kingdom) Michael Caine	(United Kingdom) Michael Caine	Motorbase Performance
7	R14	Silverstone Circuit, Northamptonshire	22 August	(United Kingdom) Tim Harvey	(United Kingdom) Michael Caine	(United Kingdom) Michael Caine	Motorbase Performance
8	R15	Knockhill Racing Circuit, Fife	5 September	(United Kingdom) Michael Caine	(United Kingdom) Michael Caine	(United Kingdom) Tim Harvey	Redline Racing
8	R16	Knockhill Racing Circuit, Fife	5 September	(United Kingdom) Michael Caine	(United Kingdom) Glynn Geddie	(United Kingdom) Michael Caine	Motorbase Performance
9	R17	Donington Park, Leicestershire	19 September	(United Kingdom) Michael Caine	(United Kingdom) Michael Caine	(United Kingdom) Michael Caine	Motorbase Performance
9	R18	Donington Park, Leicestershire	19 September	(United Kingdom) Michael Caine	(United Kingdom) Michael Caine	(United Kingdom) Michael Caine	Motorbase Performance
10	R19	Brands Hatch (Indy), Kent	9 October	(United Kingdom) Stephen Jelley	(United Kingdom) Michael Caine	(United Kingdom) Stephen Jelley	Team Parker Racing
10	R20	Brands Hatch (Indy), Kent	10 October	(United Kingdom) Stephen Jelley	(United Kingdom) Glynn Geddie	(United Kingdom) Stephen Jelley	Team Parker Racing

== Standings ==
Pos	Driver	THR		ROC		BHGP		OUL		CRO		SNE		SIL		KNO		DON		BHI		Pen	Pts
1	(United Kingdom) Tim Harvey	1	1	1	1	2	1	1	1	1	1	2	1	2	2	1	4	2	2	2	19	3^{1}	370
2	(United Kingdom) Michael Caine	2	3	2	2	1	2	Ret	2	3	2	1	2	1	1	2	1	1	1	6	3		360
3	(United Kingdom) Stephen Jelley	6	DNS	Ret	4	3	Ret	3	3	2	4	3	3	3	3	7	9	3	13	1	1		248
4	(United Kingdom) Glynn Geddie	7	5	6	3	4	4	4	5	8	14	4	5	6	5	3	7	4	5	3	9	9^{2}	227
5	(United Kingdom) Euan Hankey	3	2	3	Ret	5	6	2	25	4	3	5	10	7	8	Ret	2	12	3	20	2	2^{3}	210
6	(United Kingdom) Ollie Jackson	10	8	4	5	13	7	9	7	6	5	7	6	5	7	10	10	8	8	8	4		182
7	(United Kingdom) Charles Bateman	5	6	9	6	Ret	5	5	9	7	10	6	7	23	Ret	4	3	5	6	5	6		179
8	(United Kingdom) Michael Meadows	11	7	8	Ret	6	NC	6	10	14	25	10	4	4	4	6	5	6	4	4	Ret	12^{4}	148
9	(United Kingdom) Tony Gilham	8	12	5	7	9	8	12	11	9	8	8	8	8	14	8	8	7	10	11	8		145
10	(Lithuania) Jonas Gelžinis	13	9	7	8	7	9	7	4	5	6	Ret	9	Ret	6	9	Ret	9	9	9	7		143
11	(Oman) Ahmad Al Harthy	9	10	10	9	14	10	10	6	Ret	9	12	Ret	10	9	11	12	10	11	10	12		106
12	(United Kingdom) Tom Bradshaw	4	4	Ret	DNS	8	3	11	21	10	7							Ret	7	7	5	2^{5}	102
13	(United Kingdom) Archie Hamilton	12	11	11	10	10	11	8	8	11	11	9	11	18	12							4^{6}	69
14	(United Kingdom) George Richardson	Ret	17	19	14	Ret	15	24	23	Ret	18	14	17	15	18	13	13	13	14	13	10		28
15	(United Kingdom) Glenn McMenamin	21	16	22	11	15	16	13	15	17	15	11	16	13	15	14	Ret	Ret	17	14	14		28
16	(Republic of Ireland) Michael Leonard					12	12					20	12	9	11								24
17	(United Kingdom) Andrew Shelley	18	Ret	17	Ret	18	17	14	17	12	12	16	18	17	DNS			11	12	18	13		22
18	(United Kingdom) George Brewster	17	15	14	15	19	22	17	16	13	19	15	Ret	14	17	12	11	20	15	17	17		22
19	(United Kingdom) Alex Martin	16	Ret	Ret	13	16	14	16	Ret	23	13	DNS	14	20	Ret	16	14			12	11	2^{7}	21
20	(United Kingdom) Steve Parish	15	14	13	12	11	Ret	20	Ret									19	19	19	15		16
21	(United Kingdom) Liam Griffin	19	19	15	18	22	19	15	12	15	16	18	13	12	16	Ret	Ret	16	16	16	Ret		16
22	(United Kingdom) Mark Hazell	14	13	12	19	17	18	18	14	18	17			Ret	21	18	DNS	14	18	15	21		14
23	(United Kingdom) Paul Mace	Ret	DNS			23	13	23	13	16	Ret	13	15	16	Ret					21	16	2^{8}	8
24	(Sweden) Martin Ohlin													Ret	10								6
25	(United Kingdom) Robbie Kerr													11	Ret								5
26	(United Kingdom) Tommy Dreelan	20	21	21	17	21	Ret	22	24	21	24	19	20	21	22	19	15	18	22	23	20		2
27	(Republic of Ireland) Karl Leonard															15	Ret						2
28	(Lithuania) Tautvydas Barštys	23	18	20	16	Ret	20	21	22	Ret	22	DNS	DNS	19	19	17	Ret			24	18		0
29	(United Kingdom) Paul Hogarth			16	DNS																		0
30	(United Kingdom) Bob Lyons			18	20	20	21	Ret	20	20	21			Ret	20	Ret	DNS	17	21	22	Ret		0
31	(United Kingdom) John Gaw							Ret	18														0
32	(United Kingdom) Richard Denny	22	20	23	Ret	Ret	DNS	19	19	22	23	17	19	22	Ret	DSQ	16					2^{9}	−1
Guest drivers ineligible for points
	(United Kingdom) Rory Butcher															5	6						0
	(United Kingdom) James Sutton													DNS	13								0
	(Turkey) Yucel Ozbek																	15	20				0
	(United Kingdom) Jeremy Clark									19	20												0
	(United Kingdom) Mike Johnson			Ret	DNS																		0
Pos	Driver	THR		ROC		BHGP		OUL		CRO		SNE		SIL		KNO		DON		BHI		Pen	Pts

Colour	Result
Gold	Winner
Silver	Second place
Bronze	Third place
Green	Points classification
Blue	Non-points classification
Blue	Non-classified finish (NC)
Purple	Retired, not classified (Ret)
Red	Did not qualify (DNQ)
Red	Did not pre-qualify (DNPQ)
Black	Disqualified (DSQ)
White	Did not start (DNS)
White	Withdrew (WD)
White	Race cancelled (C)
Blank	Did not practice (DNP)
Blank	Did not arrive (DNA)
Blank	Excluded (EX)

Notes:

1. – Tim Harvey was penalised three points at Oulton Park.
2. – Glynn Geddie was penalised three points at Brands Hatch GP, with a further six-point penalty at Oulton Park.
3. – Euan Hankey was penalised two points at Rockingham.
4. – Michael Meadows was penalised two points at Thruxton. A four-point penalty was given at Croft and a six-point penalty was given at Donington.
5. – Tom Bradshaw was penalised two points at Donington.
6. – Archie Hamilton was penalised two points at Thruxton, and Silverstone.
7. – Alex Martin was penalised two points at Snetterton.
8. – Paul Mace was penalised two points at Silverstone.
9. – Richard Denny was penalised two points at Brands Hatch GP.
