= 2006 Porsche Carrera Cup Great Britain =

The 2006 Porsche Carrera Cup Great Britain was the fourth season of the one-make championship. It consisted of 20 rounds, beginning on 8 April at Brands Hatch and finishing on 15 October at Silverstone. The series supported the British Touring Car Championship throughout the season. Damien Faulkner won his second consecutive title, ahead of Tim Harvey and Danny Watts.

== Changes for 2006 ==
- The 997 model 911 GT3 replaced the 996.
- Races were approximately 55% longer than in 2005.
- The Pro-Am class for non-professional drivers was introduced.

== Entry list ==
- All drivers raced in Porsche 911 GT3s.

Team	No	Driver	Rounds
Team Parker with SAS	1	(Republic of Ireland) Damien Faulkner	All
Team Parker with SAS	3	(United Kingdom) Jason Templeman	All
Team Irwin with Redline Racing	2	(United Kingdom) Richard Westbrook	1, 4
Team Irwin with Redline Racing	2	(United Kingdom) Danny Watts	2-3, 5-10
Motorbase Performance	4	(United Kingdom) Tim Harvey	All
Motorbase Performance	44	(United Kingdom) Michael Caine	All
Trackspeed	11	(United Kingdom) Piers Masarati	1
Team RPM	12	(United Kingdom) Mark Cole	1
In2Racing	20	(United Kingdom) Richard Williams	All
In2Racing	21	(United Kingdom) James Pickford	8
In2Racing	22	(United Kingdom) James Pickford	9-10
In2Racing	23	(United Kingdom) Tim Sugden	2
Tech 9	32	(United Kingdom) Mark Cole	3-5
Team Parker	68	(United Kingdom) Sam Edwards	1-2
Pro-Am
Redline Racing	5	(United Kingdom) Nigel Rice	All
Redline Racing	8	(United Kingdom) Jason Young	1-4, 6-7, 9
Redline Racing	48	(United Kingdom) Maxi Jazz	1-6, 9-10
Motorbase Performance	14	(United Kingdom) Andy Britnell	10
Motorbase Performance	27	(United Kingdom) Phil Quaife	All
Trackspeed	10	(United Kingdom) David Ashburn	All
Team RPM	12	(United Kingdom) Alex Mortimer	6
Team Parker	18	(United Kingdom) Mark Hazell	1-4, 6, 9-10
Team Parker	68	(United Kingdom) Sam Edwards	3-10
In2Racing	21	(United Kingdom) Mike Richards	1-4, 6-7, 9-10
In2Racing	22	(United Kingdom) Paul Warren	1
In2Racing	23	(United Kingdom) Paul Hogarth	1-3, 6-10
Team O	24	(United Kingdom) Pete Osborne	1, 3-7, 9-10
Tech 9	32	(Greece) Andy Demetriou	10
Tech 9	33	(United Kingdom) Phil Hindley	3
RH Motorsport with Paragon	77	(United Kingdom) Andy Purdie	1, 4-10
Guest
Porsche Motorsport	43	(United Kingdom) Mark Hales	1
Porsche Motorsport	43	(Republic of Ireland) Michael Devaney	2
Porsche Motorsport	43	(United Kingdom) Paul O'Neill	3
Porsche Motorsport	43	(Germany) Sascha Maassen	4
Porsche Motorsport	43	(United Kingdom) Ian White	5
Porsche Motorsport	43	(United Kingdom) Owen Mildenhall	6
Porsche Motorsport	43	(United Kingdom) Rob Huff	7
Porsche Motorsport	43	(United Kingdom) Colin McRae	8
Porsche Motorsport	43	(Republic of Ireland) Shane Lynch	9
Porsche Motorsport	43	(United Kingdom) Vicki Butler-Henderson	10

== Calendar & Winners ==
All races were held in the United Kingdom (excepting Mondello Park round that held in Ireland).

Round		Venue	Date	Pole position	Fastest lap	Winning driver	Winning team
1	R1	Brands Hatch Indy, Kent	8–9 April	(United Kingdom) Tim Harvey	(United Kingdom) Richard Westbrook	(United Kingdom) Richard Westbrook	Team Irwin with Redline Racing
1	R2	Brands Hatch Indy, Kent	8–9 April		(United Kingdom) Tim Harvey	(United Kingdom) Richard Westbrook	Team Irwin with Redline Racing
2	R3	Mondello Park, County Kildare	22–23 April	(Republic of Ireland) Damien Faulkner	(Republic of Ireland) Damien Faulkner	(Republic of Ireland) Damien Faulkner	Team Parker with SAS
2	R4	Mondello Park, County Kildare	22–23 April		(Republic of Ireland) Damien Faulkner	(United Kingdom) Tim Harvey	Motorbase Performance
3	R5	Oulton Park, Cheshire	13–14 May	(United Kingdom) Danny Watts	(United Kingdom) Danny Watts	(United Kingdom) Danny Watts	Team Irwin with Redline Racing
3	R6	Oulton Park, Cheshire	13–14 May		(Republic of Ireland) Damien Faulkner	(United Kingdom) Danny Watts	Team Irwin with Redline Racing
4	R7	Thruxton Circuit, Hampshire	3–4 June	(Republic of Ireland) Damien Faulkner	(Republic of Ireland) Damien Faulkner	(Republic of Ireland) Damien Faulkner	Team Parker with SAS
4	R8	Thruxton Circuit, Hampshire	3–4 June		(United Kingdom) Richard Westbrook	(United Kingdom) Richard Westbrook	Team Irwin with Redline Racing
5	R9	Croft Circuit, North Yorkshire	15–16 July	(United Kingdom) Danny Watts	(United Kingdom) Danny Watts	(United Kingdom) Danny Watts	Team Irwin with Redline Racing
5	R10	Croft Circuit, North Yorkshire	15–16 July		(United Kingdom) Danny Watts	(United Kingdom) Danny Watts	Team Irwin with Redline Racing
6	R11	Donington Park, Leicestershire	29–30 July	(United Kingdom) Danny Watts	(Republic of Ireland) Damien Faulkner	(United Kingdom) Danny Watts	Team Irwin with Redline Racing
6	R12	Donington Park, Leicestershire	29–30 July		(United Kingdom) Danny Watts	(United Kingdom) Danny Watts	Team Irwin with Redline Racing
7	R13	Snetterton Motor Racing Circuit, Norfolk	12–13 August	(United Kingdom) Danny Watts	(Republic of Ireland) Damien Faulkner	(United Kingdom) Danny Watts	Team Irwin with Redline Racing
7	R14	Snetterton Motor Racing Circuit, Norfolk	12–13 August		(United Kingdom) Danny Watts	(United Kingdom) Danny Watts	Team Irwin with Redline Racing
8	R15	Knockhill Racing Circuit, Fife	2–3 September	(United Kingdom) Tim Harvey	(United Kingdom) Michael Caine	(Republic of Ireland) Damien Faulkner	Team Parker with SAS
8	R16	Knockhill Racing Circuit, Fife	2–3 September		(United Kingdom) Danny Watts	(United Kingdom) Tim Harvey	Motorbase Performance
9	R17	Brands Hatch Indy, Kent	23–24 September	(United Kingdom) Danny Watts	(United Kingdom) Mike Richards	(United Kingdom) Danny Watts	Team Irwin with Redline Racing
9	R18	Brands Hatch Indy, Kent	23–24 September		(United Kingdom) Jason Templeman	(United Kingdom) Danny Watts	Team Irwin with Redline Racing
10	R19	Silverstone Circuit, Northamptonshire	14–15 October	(United Kingdom) Danny Watts	(United Kingdom) James Pickford	(United Kingdom) James Pickford	In2Racing
10	R20	Silverstone Circuit, Northamptonshire	14–15 October		(United Kingdom) James Pickford	(United Kingdom) Tim Harvey	Motorbase Performance

== Championship Standings ==
Points were awarded on a 20, 18, 16, 14, 12, 10, 9, 8, 7, 6, 5, 4, 3, 2, 1 basis to the top 15 finishers in each race, with 1 point for the fastest lap in each race and 1 point for pole position in the first race of each meeting.

Pos	Driver	BRA		MON		OUL		THR		CRO		DON		SNE		KNO		BRA		SIL		Pts
1	(Republic of Ireland) Damien Faulkner	3	2	**1**	**2**	3	3	**1**	**Ret**	2	2	2	3	3	3	1	**2**	3	2	3	2	340
2	(United Kingdom) Tim Harvey	**2**	3	2	1	2	2	2	Ret	3	3	3	2	Ret	Ret	**3**	1	2	14	2	1	289
3	(United Kingdom) Danny Watts			Ret	3	**1**	**1**			**1**	**1**	**1**	**1**	**1**	**1**	Ret	8	**1**	**1**	**Ret**	4	250
4	(United Kingdom) Richard Williams	6	5	4	6	5	4	13	3	5	4	15	8	6	4	6	7	7	4	7	5	221
5	(United Kingdom) Jason Templeman	4	4	Ret	Ret	15	9	5	Ret	11	6	4	4	4	15	5	3	5	3	9	6	184
6	(United Kingdom) Michael Caine	5	6	Ret	Ret	Ret	Ret	3	Ret	4	Ret	9	6	2	2	4	9	4	5	4	3	183
7	(United Kingdom) Phil Quaife	10	8	5	5	4	5	7	Ret	7	5	5	Ret	7	5	11	4	13	11	11	7	173
8	(United Kingdom) Sam Edwards	DSQ	DSQ	6	7	9	6	6	Ret	8	8	7	Ret	5	6	7	Ret	8	DSQ	10	8	130
9	(United Kingdom) Nigel Rice	7	10	7	Ret	12	8	Ret	7	Ret	10	8	11	12	10	9	10	10	9	13	9	114
10	(United Kingdom) Andy Purdie	11	11					10	5	9	9	Ret	Ret	Ret	9	8	5	9	7	5	Ret	101
11	(United Kingdom) David Ashburn	13	9	9	9	11	11	Ret	8	10	12	12	10	8	12	10	11	12	Ret	14	13	99
12	(United Kingdom) Mike Richards	9	14	Ret	Ret	8	12	9	Ret			10	7	10	8			6	10	6	11	93
13	(United Kingdom) Jason Young	8	7	8	8	14	10	Ret	6			18	9	11	11			11	8			87
14	(United Kingdom) Richard Westbrook	1	**1**					15	1													64
15	(United Kingdom) James Pickford															2	6	DNS	6	1	**Ret**	60
16	(United Kingdom) Pete Osborne	16	15			13	Ret	12	11	13	11	11	13	9	13			16	13	17	12	52
17	(United Kingdom) Mark Cole	12	Ret			Ret	7	14	4	6	7											51
18	(United Kingdom) Mark Hazell	Ret	13	10	Ret	10	13	8	9			13	14					14	12	Ret	Ret	50
19	(United Kingdom) Maxi Jazz	Ret	Ret	11	Ret	Ret	14	11	10	Ret	14	16	Ret					18	Ret	18	16	26
20	(United Kingdom) Alex Mortimer											6	5									22
21	(United Kingdom) Paul Hogarth	15	DNS	Ret	DNS	Ret	Ret					17	Ret	DSQ	14	12	DNS	15	DNS	15	14	12
22	(United Kingdom) Phil Hindley					7	Ret															10
23	(United Kingdom) Andy Britnell																			12	10	10
24	(Greece) Andy Demetriou																			8	Ret	8
25	(United Kingdom) Paul Warren	14	Ret																			2
26	(United Kingdom) Piers Masarati	17	DSQ																			0
NC	(United Kingdom) Tim Sugden			DNS	Ret																	0
guest drivers ineligible for points.
	(Germany) Sascha Maassen							4	2													0
	(Republic of Ireland) Michael Devaney			3	4																	0
	(United Kingdom) Paul O'Neill					6	Ret															0
	(United Kingdom) Rob Huff													Ret	7							0
	(United Kingdom) Ian White									12	13											0
	(United Kingdom) Owen Mildenhall											14	12									0
	(United Kingdom) Mark Hales	Ret	12																			0
	(United Kingdom) Vicki Butler-Henderson																			16	15	0
	(Republic of Ireland) Shane Lynch																	17	Ret			0
	(United Kingdom) Colin McRae															Ret	Ret					0
Pos	Driver	BRA		MON		OUL		THR		CRO		DON		SNE		KNO		BRA		SIL		Pts

Colour	Result
Gold	Winner
Silver	Second place
Bronze	Third place
Green	Points classification
Blue	Non-points classification
Blue	Non-classified finish (NC)
Purple	Retired, not classified (Ret)
Red	Did not qualify (DNQ)
Red	Did not pre-qualify (DNPQ)
Black	Disqualified (DSQ)
White	Did not start (DNS)
White	Withdrew (WD)
White	Race cancelled (C)
Blank	Did not practice (DNP)
Blank	Did not arrive (DNA)
Blank	Excluded (EX)

**Bold** – Pole
Italics – Fastest Lap
