= 2004 Porsche Carrera Cup Great Britain =

The 2004 Porsche Carrera Cup Great Britain was a multi-event, one make motor racing championship held across England, Scotland and Ireland. The championship featured a mix of professional motor racing teams and privately funded drivers, competing in Porsche 911 GT3 cars that conform to the technical regulations for the championship. It forms part of the extensive program of support categories built up around the BTCC centrepiece.

This season was the second Porsche Carrera Cup Great Britain. The season began on 10 April at Thruxton Circuit and concluded on 27 September at Donington Park, after 20 races held at ten meetings, all in support of the 2004 British Touring Car Championship.

Richard Westbrook became the drivers' champion driving for Redline Racing.

== Entry list ==
- All drivers raced in Porsche 911 GT3s.

Team	No	Driver	Rounds
BEAST Racing	2	(United Kingdom) Richard Westbrook	1-2
Redline Racing	2	(United Kingdom) Richard Westbrook	3-10
BEAST Racing	5	(United Kingdom) David Pinkney	1-2
BEAST Racing	37	(United Kingdom) Michael Corridan	3
Pinkney Motorsport	5	(United Kingdom) David Pinkney	6, 8, 10
Vic Lee Racing	3	(United Kingdom) Jason Templeman	All
Vic Lee Racing	20	(United Kingdom) Marcus Thomas	All
Team RPM	4	(United Kingdom) Tim Harvey	All
Team RPM	6	(United Kingdom) Steve Clark	10
Team RPM	8	(United Kingdom) Eddie Wighton	6-7, 9-10
Team RPM	96	(United Kingdom) Alexander Mortimer	9
Team Parker Racing	6	(United Kingdom) Tom Ferrier	7-8
Team Parker Racing	7	(United Kingdom) Chris Cooper	1-4, 8, 10
Team Parker Racing	11	(United Kingdom) Mark Hazell	1-8
Team Parker Racing	24	(United Kingdom) Martin Rich	1-6, 10
Team Parker Racing	37	(United Kingdom) Michael Corridan	4-10
Redline Racing	10	(United Kingdom) Jason Young	All
Redline Racing	15	(United Kingdom) Nigel Rice	All
Redline Racing	16	(United Kingdom) Andrew Shelley	6, 8
Redline Racing	28	(United Kingdom) Jonathan Cocker	1
Redline Racing	40	(United Kingdom) Des Winks	1-4
Motorbase Performance	21	(Republic of Ireland) Damien Faulkner	6-10
Motorbase Performance	22	(United Kingdom) Gary Britnell	All
Motorbase Performance	23	(United Kingdom) Andy Britnell	All
Motorbase Performance	77	(Republic of Ireland) Damien Faulkner	5
Total Control Racing	26	(United Kingdom) Ray MacDowell	6
Total Control Racing	27	(United Kingdom) Jonathan Fildes	All
Guest
Porsche Motorsport	1	(United Kingdom) Matthew Marsh	1
Porsche Motorsport	1	(United Kingdom) Perry McCarthy	2, 8
Porsche Motorsport	1	(United Kingdom) Warren Hughes	3
Porsche Motorsport	1	(Switzerland) Alain Menu	4
Porsche Motorsport	1	(Republic of Ireland) Robby Coleman	5
Porsche Motorsport	1	(United Kingdom) John Cleland	7
Porsche Motorsport	1	(United Kingdom) David Rothwell	9
Porsche Motorsport	1	(New Zealand) Paul Radisich	10

== Calendar & Winners ==
All races were held in the United Kingdom (excepting Mondello Park round that held in Ireland).

Round		Venue	Date	Pole position	Fastest lap	Winning driver	Winning team
1	R1	Thruxton Circuit, Hampshire	11 April	(United Kingdom) Tim Harvey	(United Kingdom) Richard Westbrook	(United Kingdom) Richard Westbrook	BEAST Racing
1	R2	Thruxton Circuit, Hampshire	11 April		(United Kingdom) Chris Cooper	(United Kingdom) Tim Harvey	Team RPM
2	R3	Brands Hatch Indy, Kent	25 April	(United Kingdom) Jason Templeman	(United Kingdom) Tim Harvey	(United Kingdom) Tim Harvey	Team RPM
2	R4	Brands Hatch Indy, Kent	25 April		(United Kingdom) Richard Westbrook	(United Kingdom) Tim Harvey	Team RPM
3	R5	Silverstone Circuit, Northamptonshire	8 May	(United Kingdom) Richard Westbrook	(United Kingdom) Tim Harvey	(United Kingdom) Richard Westbrook	Redline Racing
3	R6	Silverstone Circuit, Northamptonshire	9 May		(United Kingdom) Tim Harvey	(United Kingdom) Tim Harvey	Team RPM
4	R7	Oulton Park, Cheshire	22 May	(Switzerland) Alain Menu	(Switzerland) Alain Menu	(Switzerland) Alain Menu	Porsche Motorsport
4	R8	Oulton Park, Cheshire	23 May		(Switzerland) Alain Menu	(Switzerland) Alain Menu	Porsche Motorsport
5	R9	Mondello Park, County Kildare	13 June	(United Kingdom) Richard Westbrook	(United Kingdom) Tim Harvey	(United Kingdom) Richard Westbrook	Redline Racing
5	R10	Mondello Park, County Kildare	13 June		(United Kingdom) Richard Westbrook	(United Kingdom) Tim Harvey	Team RPM
6	R11	Croft Circuit, North Yorkshire	24 July	(United Kingdom) Tim Harvey	(United Kingdom) Tim Harvey	(United Kingdom) Tim Harvey	Team RPM
6	R12	Croft Circuit, North Yorkshire	25 July		(United Kingdom) Tim Harvey	(United Kingdom) Tim Harvey	Team RPM
7	R13	Knockhill Racing Circuit, Fife	8 August	(United Kingdom) Jason Templeman	(United Kingdom) Tim Harvey	(United Kingdom) Richard Westbrook	Redline Racing
7	R14	Knockhill Racing Circuit, Fife	8 August		(Republic of Ireland) Damien Faulkner	(United Kingdom) Richard Westbrook	Redline Racing
8	R15	Brands Hatch Indy, Kent	22 August	(United Kingdom) Jason Templeman	(United Kingdom) Jason Templeman	(United Kingdom) Jason Templeman	Vic Lee Racing
8	R16	Brands Hatch Indy, Kent	22 August		(Republic of Ireland) Jonathan Fildes	(United Kingdom) Jason Templeman	Vic Lee Racing
9	R17	Snetterton Motor Racing Circuit, Norfolk	5 September	(United Kingdom) Richard Westbrook	(United Kingdom) Tim Harvey	(United Kingdom) Tim Harvey	Team RPM
9	R18	Snetterton Motor Racing Circuit, Norfolk	5 September		(Republic of Ireland) Damien Faulkner	(United Kingdom) Richard Westbrook	Redline Racing
10	R19	Donington Park, Leicestershire	26 September	(United Kingdom) Jason Templeman	(United Kingdom) Richard Westbrook	(United Kingdom) Richard Westbrook	Redline Racing
10	R20	Donington Park, Leicestershire	26 September		(Republic of Ireland) Damien Faulkner	(Republic of Ireland) Damien Faulkner	Motorbase Performance

== Drivers' Championship ==
Points were awarded on a 20, 18, 16, 14, 12, 10, 9, 8, 7, 6, 5, 4, 3, 2, 1 basis to the top 15 finishers in each race, with 1 point for the fastest lap in each race and 1 point for pole position in the first race of each meeting.

Pos	Driver	THR		BHI		SIL		OUL		MON		CRO		KNO		BHI		SNE		DON		Pts
1	(United Kingdom) Richard Westbrook	1	**5**	Ret	3	**1**	**2**	3	3	**1**	**2**	2	6	1	**1**	3	2	**2**	1	1	**2**	345
2	(United Kingdom) Tim Harvey	**5**	1	1	**1**	3	1	4	4	2	1	**1**	**1**	2	2	Ret	6	1	**2**	4	5	338
3	(United Kingdom) Jason Templeman	2	Ret	**2**	2	2	14	**2**	**2**	3	DSQ	Ret	11	**12**	8	**1**	**1**	5	5	**3**	3	253
4	(Republic of Ireland) Jonathan Fildes	3	4	4	4	4	5	5	6	9	Ret	3	Ret	4	12	4	4	4	4	7	Ret	221
5	(United Kingdom) Nigel Rice	6	3	5	6	Ret	8	7	5	4	3	13	4	5	5	8	Ret	6	6	5	8	205
6	(United Kingdom) Andy Britnell	8	7	6	7	6	7	10	8	Ret	5	5	3	9	6	11	9	11	7	12	10	176
7	(Republic of Ireland) Damien Faulkner									Ret	DNS	Ret	2	Ret	4	2	3	3	3	2	1	139
8	(United Kingdom) Jason Young	10	12	8	11	9	6	11	9	6	7	Ret	Ret	10	10	13	10	8	8	10	7	136
9	(United Kingdom) Chris Cooper	4	2	Ret	8	10	4	6	7							9	Ret			6	4	117
10	(United Kingdom) Gary Britnell	11	Ret	Ret	9	8	10	9	Ret	7	6	8	Ret	7	7	12	8	10	Ret	Ret	13	109
11	(United Kingdom) Marcus Thomas	Ret	DNS	7	14	5	11	13	12	Ret	9	6	9			7	5			9	12	99
12	(United Kingdom) Martin Rich	13	11	Ret	10	Ret	9	8	10	5	8	Ret	Ret							13	11	72
13	(United Kingdom) Mark Hazell	12	10	Ret	13	11	12	12	Ret	DNS	DNS	10	7	8	9	10	Ret					68
14	(United Kingdom) Michael Corridan					DNS	DNS	14	11	8	10	12	12	13	13	15	12	13	11	15	16	58
15	(United Kingdom) David Pinkney	Ret	9	Ret	DNS							4	Ret			5	Ret			11	9	48
16	(United Kingdom) Tom Ferrier													3	3	6	Ret					42
17	(United Kingdom) Eddie Wighton											11	10	11	11			12	10	14	15	39
18	(United Kingdom) Andrew Shelley											9	8			14	11					23
19	(United Kingdom) Des Winks	Ret	13	Ret	12	7	13	DNS	DNS													22
20	(United Kingdom) Ray MacDowell											7	5									21
21	(United Kingdom) Jonathan Cocker	7	8																			18
22	(United Kingdom) Alexander Mortimer																	7	Ret			9
23	(United Kingdom) Steve Clark																			Ret	14	3
guest drivers ineligible for points
	(Switzerland) Alain Menu							**1**	**1**													0
	(United Kingdom) Perry McCarthy			3	5											Ret	7					0
	(United Kingdom) Warren Hughes					Ret	3															0
	(Republic of Ireland) Robby Coleman									Ret	4											0
	(New Zealand) Paul Radisich																			8	6	0
	(United Kingdom) Matthew Marsh	9	6																			0
	(United Kingdom) John Cleland													6	Ret							0
	(United Kingdom) David Rothwell																	9	9			0
Pos	Driver	THR		BHI		SIL		OUL		MON		CRO		KNO		BHI		SNE		DON		Pts

Colour	Result
Gold	Winner
Silver	Second place
Bronze	Third place
Green	Points classification
Blue	Non-points classification
Blue	Non-classified finish (NC)
Purple	Retired, not classified (Ret)
Red	Did not qualify (DNQ)
Red	Did not pre-qualify (DNPQ)
Black	Disqualified (DSQ)
White	Did not start (DNS)
White	Withdrew (WD)
White	Race cancelled (C)
Blank	Did not practice (DNP)
Blank	Did not arrive (DNA)
Blank	Excluded (EX)

**Bold** – Pole
Italics – Fastest Lap
