= Glynn Geddie =

British racing driver (born 1990)

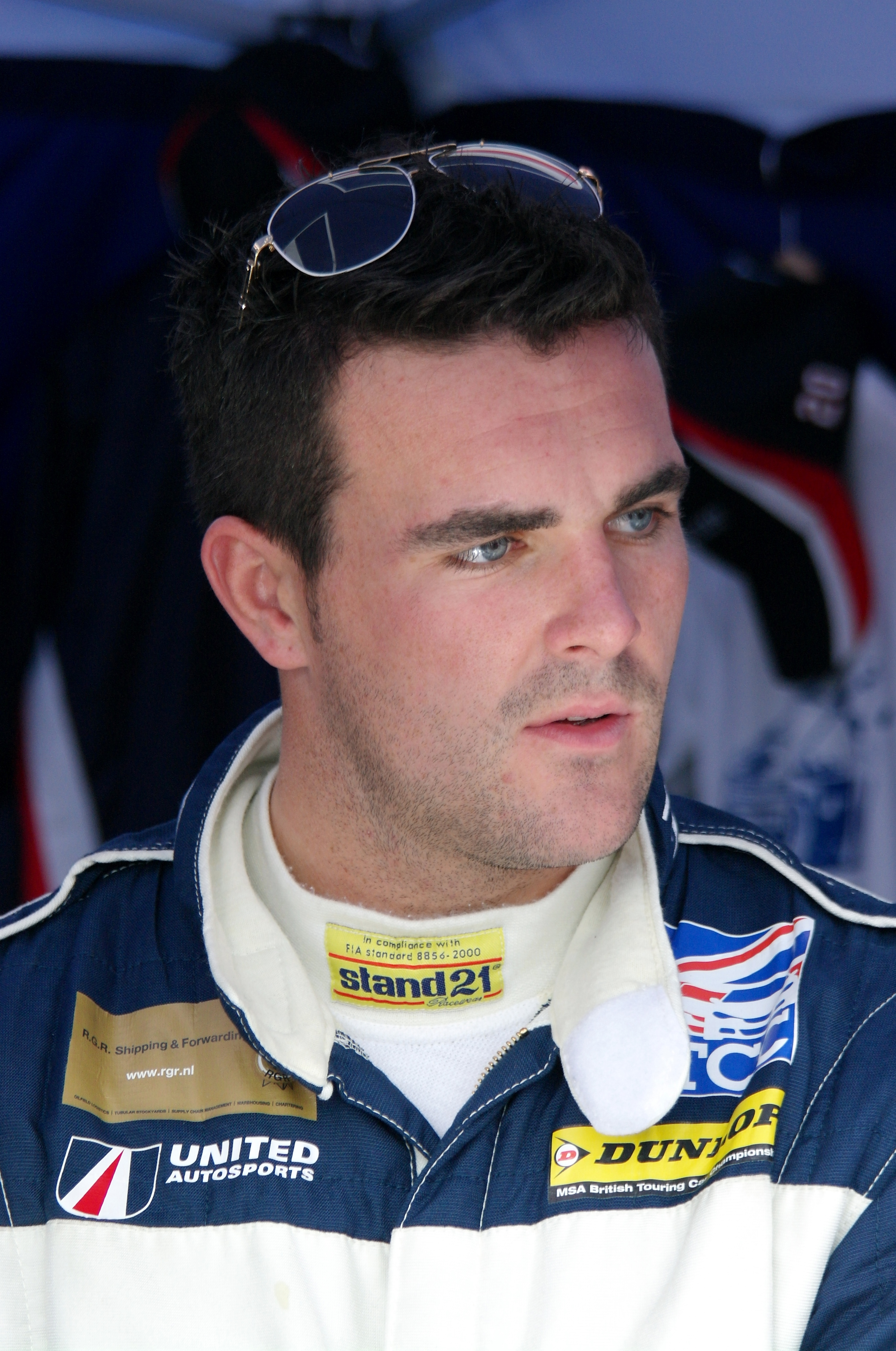
- Geddie at the Brands Hatch Indy round of the 2014 British Touring Car Championship season
- Nationality: (United Kingdom) British
- Born: Glynn James Geddie; 17 June 1990 (age 36) Aberdeen, Scotland, UK

British Touring Car Championship career
- Debut season: 2014
- Current team: Team HARD with Autobrite Direct
- Categorisation: FIA Silver
- Car number: 88
- Former teams: United Autosports, AmD with AutoAid/RCIB Insurance Racing
- Starts: 44
- Wins: 0
- Poles: 0
- Fastest laps: 0
- Best finish: 22nd in 2014

Previous series
- 2013 2013 2012 2011 2011 2011 2010–2013 2010, 2012–13 2008–2010, 12: Blancpain Endurance Series; European Supercar Challenge; Porsche Supercup; FIA GT3 European; International GT Open; Rolex Sports Car Series; British GT Championship; Dutch Supercar Challenge; Porsche Carrera Cup GB

Championship titles
- 2011 2013: British GT Championship; Supercar Challenge - Super GT

Glynn James Geddie (born 17 June 1990) is a British racing driver from Aberdeen, who last competed in the 2021 British Touring Car Championship for Team HARD. After spending his early racing career in GT cars and winning the 2011 British GT Championship, Geddie made his touring car debut in the 2014 British Touring Car Championship season.

== Career ==
=== British GT Championship ===
Geddie made his debut in the British GT Championship in 2010 with Trackspeed, joining David Ashburn for the third round of the season at Knockhill. Geddie returned to the team full-time starting at the Rockingham round, the pair took four victories to secure the championship for Ashburn and second place for Geddie. For 2011, Geddie raced a Ferrari 458 Italia for CRS Racing alongside his dad Jim; the pair started the season in an older Ferrari F430 Scuderia GT3 while they awaited delivery of the new car. The pair went on to win the championship by 14 points over reigning champion Ashburn despite a best result of two-second-place finishes at Snetterton and Rockingham. The Geddies only competed in one event in the 2012 British GT season, racing an Apex Motorsport run McLaren MP4-12C GT3 at Silverstone where they finished fifth. Geddie joined United Autosports for opening race of the 2013 British GT season at Oulton Park, substituting for Rob Bell in the No. 23 McLaren alongside Zak Brown. Geddie returned to the team at Snetterton, partnering Jody Firth.

=== British Touring Car Championship ===
==== United Autosports (2014) ====
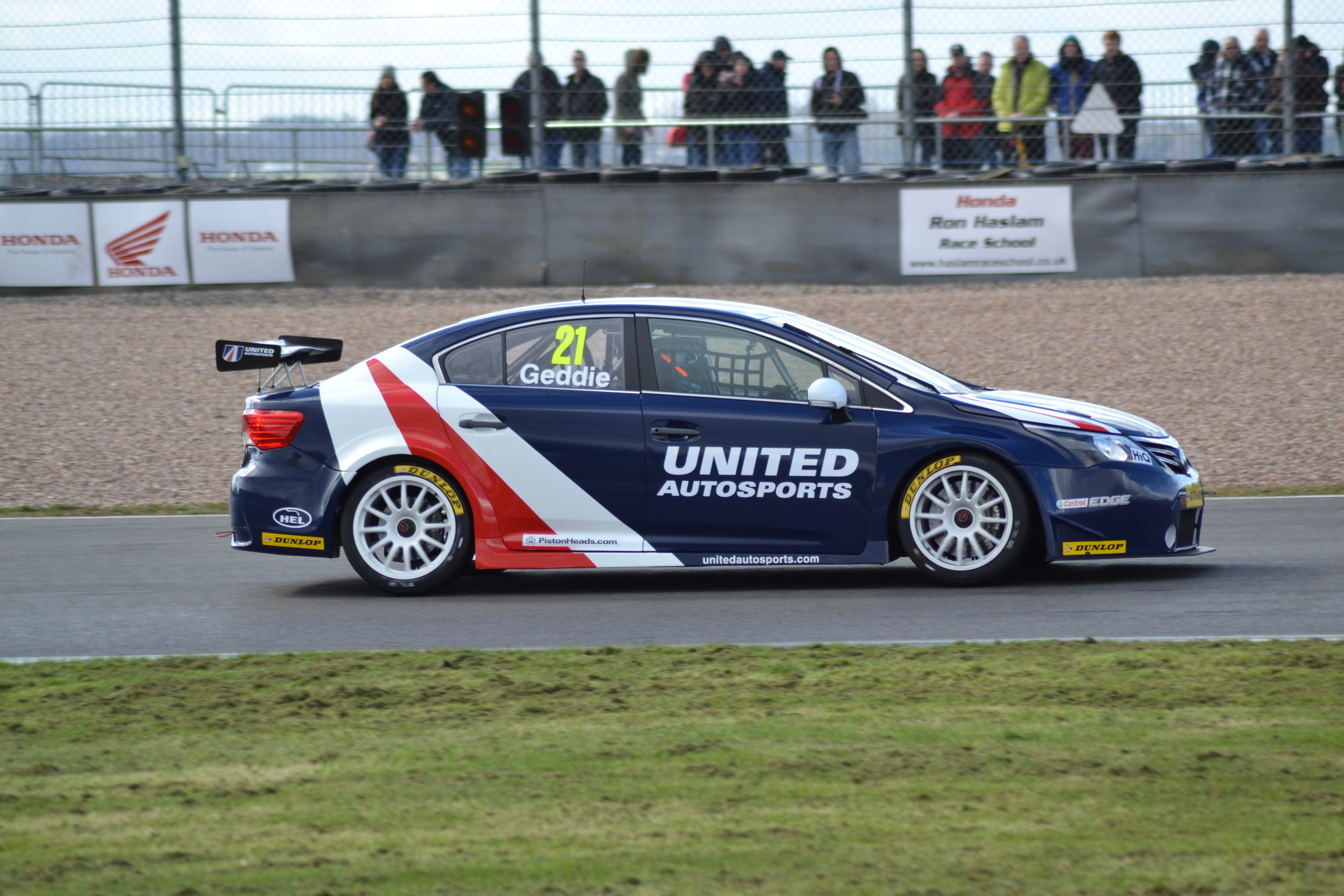
Geddie driving the United Autosports Toyota Avensis at Donington Park during the 2014 British Touring Car Championship season.

For 2014, Geddie raced for United Autosports in the British Touring Car Championship. Geddie would leave the team with two rounds remaining and was replaced by former race winner Luke Hines.

==== AmD Tuning (2018) ====
Geddie returned to the championship in 2018 with the AmD Tuning team for the rounds at Rockingham and Knockhill, scoring points in the latter.

==== Team HARD (2020–21) ====
After the departure mid-season of Ollie Brown, Geddie again made a return to the BTCC for the final two rounds of the 2020 season, driving a Volkswagen CC for Team HARD. Geddie then agreed a deal to remain with the team for 2021 driving a new Cupra Leon but took the decision to stand down from the seat after three rounds citing personal reasons.

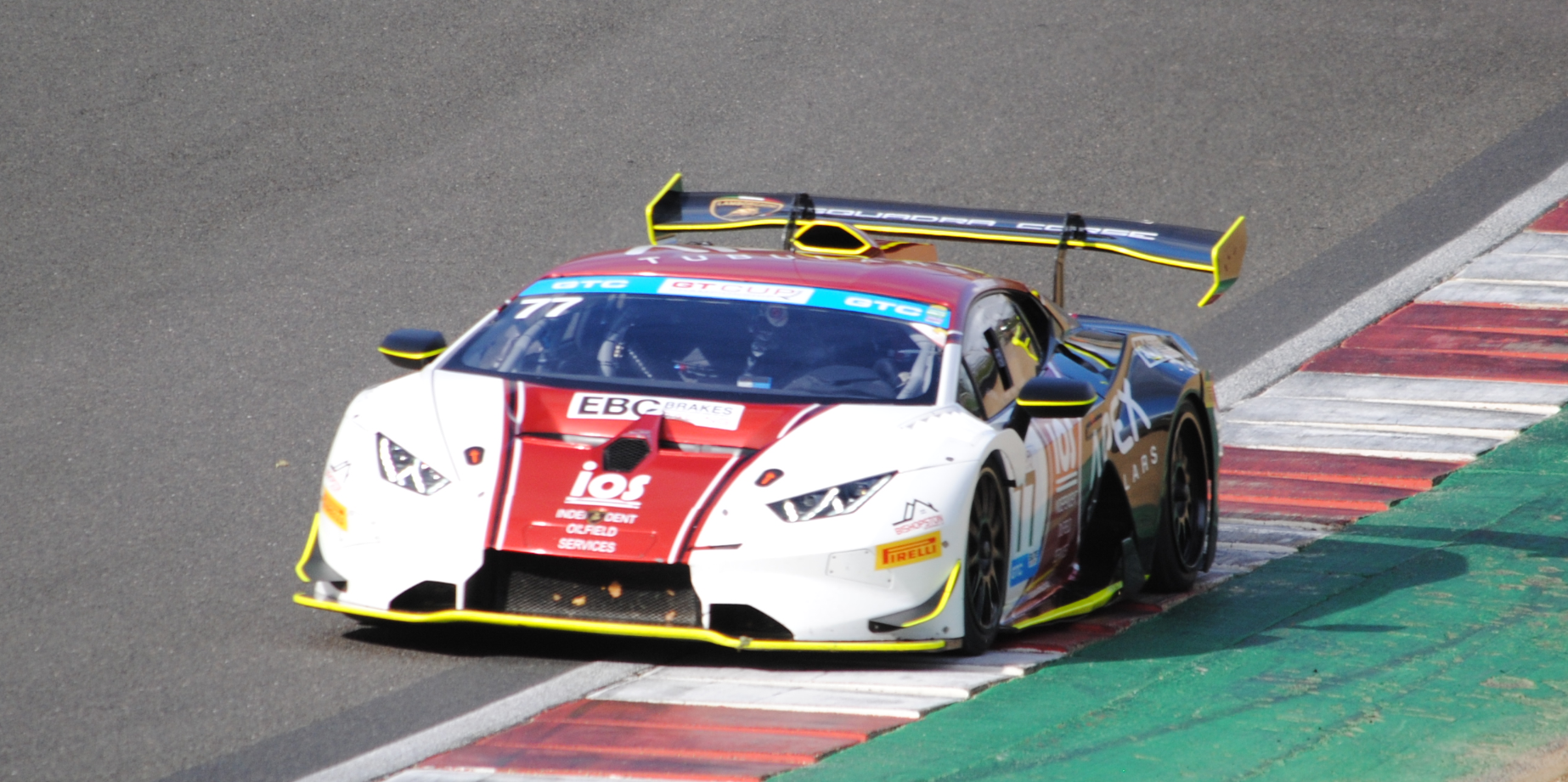
Geddie driving a Lamborghini Huracán Super Trofeo Evo in the GT Cup Championship.

== Racing record ==
=== Complete British GT Championship results ===
(key) (Races in bold indicate pole position in class) (Races in italics indicate fastest lap in class)

| Year | Team | Car | Class | 1 | 2 | 3 | 4 | 5 | 6 | 7 | 8 | 9 | 10 | 11 | 12 | 13 | DC | Pts |
|---|---|---|---|---|---|---|---|---|---|---|---|---|---|---|---|---|---|---|
| 2010 | Trackspeed | Porsche 997 GT3-R | GT3 | OUL; 1 | OUL; 2 | KNO; 1; 3 | KNO; 2 Ret | SPA; 1 | ROC; 1; 1 | **ROC**; **2**; 1 | SIL; 1; 1 | SNE; 1; 4 | SNE; 2; 9 | BRH; 1; 1 | BRH; 2; 5 | DON; 1; 2 | **2nd** | **81** |
| 2011 | CRS Racing | Ferrari F430 Scuderia GT3 | GT3 | OUL; 1; 8 | OUL; 2; 5 | | | | | | | | | | | | **1st** | **144** |
| 2011 | CRS Racing | Ferrari 458 Italia | GT3 | | | **SNE**; **1**; 2 | BRH; 1; 3 | SPA; 1; 3 | SPA; 2; 6 | ROC; 1; 12 | ROC; 2; 2 | DON; 1; 5 | SIL; 1; 3 | | | | **1st** | **144** |
| 2012 | Apex Motorsport | McLaren MP4-12C GT3 | GT3 | OUL; 1 | OUL; 2 | NÜR; 1 | NÜR; 2 | ROC; 1 | BRH; 1 | SNE; 1 | SNE; 2 | SIL; 1; 5 | DON; 1 | | | | 26th | 15 |
| 2013 | United Autosports | McLaren MP4-12C GT3 | GT3 | OUL; 1; 27† | OUL; 2; 10 | ROC; 1 | SIL; 1 | SNE; 1; 8 | SNE; 2; 14 | BRH; 1 Ret | ZAN; 1 | ZAN; 2 | DON; 1 | | | | 27th | 5 |
| 2014 | United Autosports | McLaren MP4-12C GT3 | GT3 | OUL; 1 | OUL; 2 | ROC; 1 | SIL; 1 Ret | SNE; 1 | SNE; 2 | SPA; 1 | SPA; 2 | BRH; 1 | DON; 1 | | | | NC | 0 |
| 2019 | Team Parker Racing | Bentley Continental GT3 | GT3 | OUL; 1 Ret | OUL; 2; 16† | SNE; 1; 2 | SNE; 2; 13 | SIL; 1; 6 | DON; 1; 11 | SPA; 1; 3 | BRH; 1 Ret | DON; 1 | | | | | 13th | 52.5 |

^{†} Driver did not finish, but was classified as he completed 90% race distance.

=== Complete Porsche Supercup results ===
(key) (Races in bold indicate pole position) (Races in italics indicate fastest lap)

| Year | Team | 1 | 2 | 3 | 4 | 5 | 6 | 7 | 8 | 9 | 10 | 11 | DC | Points |
|---|---|---|---|---|---|---|---|---|---|---|---|---|---|---|
| 2012 | Porsche Carrera Cup GB | BHR | BHR | ESP | MON; 22 | ESP | | | | | | | NC‡ | 0‡ |
| 2012 | Redline Racing | | | | | | GBR; Ret | GER | HUN | HUN | BEL | ITA | NC‡ | 0‡ |

‡ Guest driver – Not eligible for points.

=== Complete British Touring Car Championship results ===
(key) (Races in bold indicate pole position – 1 point awarded just in first race) (Races in italics indicate fastest lap – 1 point awarded all races) (* signifies that driver lead race for at least one lap – 1 point given all races)

| Year | Team | Car | 1 | 2 | 3 | 4 | 5 | 6 | 7 | 8 | 9 | 10 | 11 | 12 | 13 | 14 | 15 | 16 | 17 | 18 | 19 | 20 | 21 | 22 | 23 | 24 | 25 | 26 | 27 | 28 | 29 | 30 | Pos | Points |
|---|---|---|---|---|---|---|---|---|---|---|---|---|---|---|---|---|---|---|---|---|---|---|---|---|---|---|---|---|---|---|---|---|---|---|
| 2014 | United Autosports | Toyota Avensis | BRH; 1; 20 | BRH; 2; 20 | BRH; 3; 25 | DON; 1; 17 | DON; 2; 13 | DON; 3 Ret | THR; 1; 15 | THR; 2; 15 | THR; 3 Ret | OUL; 1; 21 | OUL; 2; 24 | OUL; 3; 12 | CRO; 1; 27 | CRO; 2; 23 | CRO; 3 Ret | SNE; 1; 14 | SNE; 2 Ret | SNE; 3; 12 | KNO; 1; 20 | KNO; 2; 20 | KNO; 3; 19 | ROC; 1; 26 | ROC; 2 Ret | ROC; 3 Ret | SIL; 1 | SIL; 2 | SIL; 3 | BRH; 1 | BRH; 2 | BRH; 3 | 22nd | 15 |
| 2018 | AmD with AutoAid RCIB Insurance Racing | MG 6 GT | BRH; 1 | BRH; 2 | BRH; 3 | DON; 1 | DON; 2 | DON; 3 | THR; 1 | THR; 2 | THR; 3 | OUL; 1 | OUL; 2 | OUL; 3 | CRO; 1 | CRO; 2 | CRO; 3 | SNE; 1 | SNE; 2 | SNE; 3 | ROC; 1; 22 | ROC; 2; 22 | ROC; 3 Ret | KNO; 1; 20 | KNO; 2; 15 | KNO; 3; 18 | SIL; 1 | SIL; 2 | SIL; 3 | BRH; 1 | BRH; 2 | BRH; 3 | 33rd | 1 |
| 2020 | RCIB Insurance with Fox Transport | Volkswagen CC | DON; 1 | DON; 2 | DON; 3 | BRH; 1 | BRH; 2 | BRH; 3 | OUL; 1 | OUL; 2 | OUL; 3 | KNO; 1 | KNO; 2 | KNO; 3 | THR; 1 | THR; 2 | THR; 3 | SIL; 1 | SIL; 2 | SIL; 3 | CRO; 1 | CRO; 2 | CRO; 3 | SNE; 1; 25 | SNE; 2; 18 | SNE; 3; 15 | BRH; 1 Ret | BRH; 2 Ret | BRH; 3; 18 | | | | 30th | 1 |
| 2021 | Team HARD with Autobrite Direct | Cupra León | THR; 1; 22 | THR; 2 Ret | THR; 3 DNS | SNE; 1; 27 | SNE; 2 Ret | SNE; 3; 22 | BRH; 1; 27 | BRH; 2 Ret | BRH; 3; 24 | OUL; 1 | OUL; 2 | OUL; 3 | KNO; 1 | KNO; 2 | KNO; 3 | THR; 1 | THR; 2 | THR; 3 | CRO; 1 | CRO; 2 | CRO; 3 | SIL; 1 | SIL; 2 | SIL; 3 | DON; 1 | DON; 2 | DON; 3 | BRH; 1 | BRH; 2 | BRH; 3 | 35th | 0 |

=== Partial GT Cup Championship results ===
(key) (Races in bold indicate pole position in class – 1 point awarded just in first race; races in italics indicate fastest lap in class – 1 point awarded all races;-

| Year | Team | Car | Class | 1 | 2 | 3 | 4 | 5 | 6 | 7 | 8 | 9 | 10 | 11 | 12 | 13 | 14 | 15 | 16 | 17 | 18 | 19 | 20 | DC | CP | Points |
|---|---|---|---|---|---|---|---|---|---|---|---|---|---|---|---|---|---|---|---|---|---|---|---|---|---|---|
| 2020 | Scott Sport | Lamborghini Huracán Super Trofeo Evo | GTC | SNE; 1 | SNE; 2 | SNE; 3 | SNE; 4 | SIL; 1 | SIL; 2 | SIL; 3 | SIL; 4 | DON1; 1; 4 | DON1; 2; 4 | DON1; 3; 5 | DON1; 4 DNS | BRH; 1; 3 | BRH; 2; 3 | BRH; 3; 2 | BRH; 4 Ret | DON2; 1 | DON2; 2 | DON2; 3 | DON2; 4 | NC† | NC† | 0† |

† Geddie was ineligible for points as he was an invitation entry.
