= 2007 Porsche Supercup =

15th Porsche Supercup season

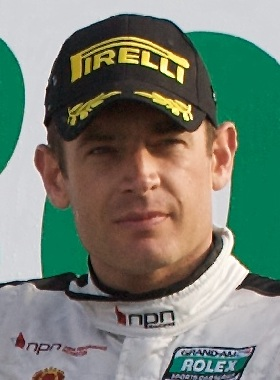
Richard Westbrook (pictured in 2010) won his second Drivers' Championship title

The 2007 Porsche Mobil 1 Supercup season was the 15th Porsche Supercup season. The races were all supporting races in the 2007 Formula One season. It travelled to nine circuits across Europe and also a double-header in Bahrain.

== Teams and drivers ==
Team	No.	Drivers	Rounds
(Germany) HISAQ Competition	1	(United Kingdom) Richard Westbrook	All
(Germany) HISAQ Competition	2	(Germany) Michael Schrey	1–5
(Germany) HISAQ Competition	2	(Germany) Marc Basseng	6–9
(Germany) HISAQ Competition	2	(Netherlands) Phil Bastiaans	10
(Germany) HISAQ Competition	57	(United Kingdom) Steven Kane	5
(Austria) Lechner Racing Bahrain	3	(Italy) Alessandro Zampedri	All
(Austria) Lechner Racing Bahrain	4	(Republic of Ireland) Damien Faulkner	All
(Germany) SPS Automotive	5	(Germany) Uwe Alzen	All
(Germany) SPS Automotive	6	(Switzerland) Marc Benz	1, 3, 10
(Germany) SPS Automotive	6	(Lithuania) Nemunas Dagilis	2, 4–5
(Germany) SPS Automotive	6	(Lithuania) Andzej Dzikevic	6–9
(Netherlands) HSF Porsche Eindhoven	7	(Netherlands) Paul van Splunteren	1–5, 7–10
(Netherlands) HSF Porsche Eindhoven	7	(Netherlands) Bernhard ten Brinke	6
(Netherlands) HSF Porsche Eindhoven	8	(Netherlands) Bernhard ten Brinke	4
(Netherlands) HSF Porsche Eindhoven	8	(Netherlands) Simon Frederiks	1–3, 5–10
(Netherlands) Golden Spike Pertamina Indonesia RT	9	(Australia) Stuart Kostera	1
(Netherlands) Golden Spike Pertamina Indonesia RT	9	(Indonesia) Maher Algadri	2–4, 6–7, 9–10
(Netherlands) Golden Spike Pertamina Indonesia RT	9	(Australia) Tim Macrow	5
(Netherlands) Golden Spike Pertamina Indonesia RT	9	(Australia) Christian Jones	8
(Netherlands) Golden Spike Pertamina Indonesia RT	10	(France) Fabrice Walfisch	1–3
(Netherlands) Golden Spike Pertamina Indonesia RT	10	(Netherlands) Jeroen Bleekemolen	4–10
(Austria) Konrad Motorsport	11	(Netherlands) Patrick Huisman	All
(Austria) Konrad Motorsport	12	(Spain) Emilio de Villota Jr.	1–2, 4–8
(Austria) Konrad Motorsport	12	(Italy) Andrea Sonvico	9
(Austria) Konrad Motorsport	12	(Finland) Markus Palttala	10
(Austria) Konrad Motorsport	12	(Finland) Mikael Forsten	3
(Austria) Konrad Motorsport	13	(Finland) Mikael Forsten	1
(Germany) MRS Team	14	(France) Olivier Maximin	All
(Germany) MRS Team	15	(United States) Will Langhorne	All
(Germany) MRS Team	24	(Brazil) Alexandre Funari Negrão	1, 8
(Germany) MRS Team	24	(Germany) René Rast	6
(Netherlands) Bleekemolen Race Planet	16	(Netherlands) Sebastiaan Bleekemolen	1–5, 8–10
(Netherlands) Bleekemolen Race Planet	16	(Germany) Oliver Freymuth	7
(Netherlands) Bleekemolen Race Planet	16	(Netherlands) Michael Bleekemolen	6
(Netherlands) Bleekemolen Race Planet	17	(Netherlands) Michael Bleekemolen	1
(Netherlands) Bleekemolen Race Planet	17	(Netherlands) Jeroen Bleekemolen	2–3
(Netherlands) Bleekemolen Race Planet	17	(Netherlands) Jaap van Lagen	4–10
(Netherlands) Racing Team Indonesia	18	(United Kingdom) Richard Williams	All
(Netherlands) Racing Team Indonesia	19	(United Kingdom) Phil Quaife	All
(Netherlands) Harders Plaza Racing	20	(Netherlands) Robert van der Berg	1–3
(Netherlands) Harders Plaza Racing	21	(Netherlands) Menno Kuus	2–3
(Austria) Lechner Racing School	22	(Slovakia) Štefan Rosina	1–5, 7–10
(Austria) Lechner Racing School	23	(Bahrain) Jaber Al Khalifa	1
(Austria) Lechner Racing School	23	(Finland) Mikael Forsten	2, 4–10
(Austria) Lechner Racing School	25	(Austria) Jörg Peham	6
(United Kingdom) Team IRWIN SAS	26	(Belgium) David Saelens	All
(United Kingdom) Team IRWIN SAS	27	(United Kingdom) Marc Hynes	All
(Germany) UPS Porsche Junior Team	28	(Germany) Lance David Arnold	2, 4–7, 9–10
(Germany) UPS Porsche Junior Team	29	(Austria) Martin Ragginger	2, 4–7, 9–10
(Germany) Tolimit Motorsport	39	(Germany) Christian Menzel	All
(Germany) Tolimit Motorsport	46	(France) Nicolas Armindo	All
(Germany) Tolimit Motorsport	47	(Germany) Hannes Plesse	2
(Germany) Schnabl Engineering (Hong Kong) Team Jebsen	55	(Hong Kong) Darryl O'Young	All
(Germany) Schnabl Engineering (Hong Kong) Team Jebsen	56	(Czech Republic) Jiří Janák	All
(Belgium) Bongou/Speedlover/Duindistel	58	(Belgium) Jürgen van Hover	10
(United Kingdom) Porsche Cars Great Britain	58	(United Kingdom) James Sutton	5
(United Kingdom) Porsche Cars Great Britain	59	(United Kingdom) Tim Harvey	5
(Germany) Porsche AG	88	(Spain) Miguel Angel de Castro	2
(Germany) Porsche AG	88	(United Kingdom) Derek Warwick	5
(Germany) Porsche AG	88	(Germany) Frank Biela	6
(Germany) Porsche AG	88	(Hungary) Norbert Kiss	7
(Germany) Porsche AG	88	(Germany) Altfrid Heger	10

== Race calendar and results ==
Round		Circuit	Country	Date	Pole position	Fastest lap	Winning driver	Winning team	Report
1	R1	Bahrain International Circuit	Bahrain	14 April	(Germany) Uwe Alzen	(Republic of Ireland) Damien Faulkner	(Republic of Ireland) Damien Faulkner	(Austria) Walter Lechner Racing	Report
1	R2	Bahrain International Circuit	Bahrain	15 April	(Republic of Ireland) Damien Faulkner	(Republic of Ireland) Damien Faulkner	(Germany) Uwe Alzen	(Germany) SPS Automotive	Report
2	R	(Spain) Circuit de Catalunya	Spain	13 May	(Netherlands) Patrick Huisman	(United Kingdom) Richard Westbrook	(United Kingdom) Richard Westbrook	(Germany) HISAQ Competition	Report
3	R	Circuit de Monaco	Monaco	27 May	(Netherlands) Jeroen Bleekemolen	(United Kingdom) Richard Westbrook	(Netherlands) Patrick Huisman	(Austria) Konrad Motorsport	Report
4	R	(France) Circuit de Nevers Magny-Cours	France	1 July	(Germany) Uwe Alzen	(United Kingdom) Richard Westbrook	(Germany) Uwe Alzen	(Germany) SPS Automotive	Report
5	R	(United Kingdom) Silverstone Circuit	United Kingdom	8 July	(France) Nicolas Armindo	(United Kingdom) Richard Westbrook	(France) Nicolas Armindo	(Germany) Tolimit Motorsport	Report
6	R	(Germany) Nürburgring	Germany	22 July	(Netherlands) Jeroen Bleekemolen	(Netherlands) Jeroen Bleekemolen	(Netherlands) Jeroen Bleekemolen	(Netherlands) Golden Spike Pertamina	Report
7	R	(Hungary) Hungaroring	Hungary	5 August	(Netherlands) Jeroen Bleekemolen	(United Kingdom) Richard Westbrook	(United Kingdom) Richard Westbrook	(Germany) HISAQ Competition	Report
8	R	(Turkey) Istanbul Park	Turkey	26 August	(Netherlands) Jeroen Bleekemolen	(Netherlands) Jeroen Bleekemolen	(Netherlands) Jeroen Bleekemolen	(Netherlands) Golden Spike Pertamina	Report
9	R	(Italy) Autodromo Nazionale Monza	Italy	9 September	(Republic of Ireland) Damien Faulkner	(Slovakia) Štefan Rosina	(Republic of Ireland) Damien Faulkner	(Austria) Walter Lechner Racing	Report
10	R	(Belgium) Circuit de Spa-Francorchamps	Belgium	16 September	(Netherlands) Jeroen Bleekemolen	(Germany) Uwe Alzen	(Netherlands) Patrick Huisman	(Austria) Konrad Motorsport	Report

== Championship standings ==
Position	1st	2nd	3rd	4th	5th	6th	7th	8th	9th	10th	11th	12th	13th	14th	15th	Ref
Points	20	18	16	14	12	10	9	8	7	6	5	4	3	2	1	

Pos	Driver	BHR (Bahrain)		CAT (Spain)	MON (Monaco)	MAG (France)	SIL (United Kingdom)	NÜR (Germany)	HUN (Hungary)	IST (Turkey)	MZA (Italy)	SPA (Belgium)	Points
1	(United Kingdom) Richard Westbrook	4	2	1	3	3	18	3	1	4	2	6	169
2	(Republic of Ireland) Damien Faulkner	1	**3**	4	6	12	5	4	3	2	**1**	3	163
3	(Germany) Uwe Alzen	**2**	1	Ret	4	**1**	6	10	18	3	3	13	128
4	(Netherlands) Patrick Huisman	8	Ret	**2**	2	7	2	12	Ret	14	12	1	107
5	(Germany) Christian Menzel	7	7	3	Ret	20	3	2	6	6	5	14	104
6	(Belgium) David Saelens	5	6	14	8	10	4	7	17	Ret	4	4	96
7	(Italy) Alessandro Zampedri	3	4	6	22	4	17	5	7	7	Ret	Ret	90
8	(Netherlands) Jeroen Bleekemolen			5	**1**	Ret	7	**1**	**2**	**1**	Ret	**2**	85
9	(France) Nicolas Armindo	Ret	8	8	7	2	**1**	11	Ret	Ret	19	Ret	72
10	(United Kingdom) Richard Williams	9	11	19	11	8	Ret	8	12	Ret	9	8	60
11	(United Kingdom) Marc Hynes	14	Ret	18	21	6	16	16	11	12	10	12	48
12	(Netherlands) Sebastiaan Bleekemolen	11	9	11	5	15	20			13	Ret	24†	42
13	(Slovakia) Štefan Rosina	12	Ret	16	12	Ret	9		8	5	Ret	Ret	42
14	(Netherlands) Jaap van Lagen					16	11	6	4	Ret	11	Ret	40
15	(France) Olivier Maximin	Ret	16	13	Ret	DSQ	14	Ret	9	8	Ret	7	38
16	(United States) Will Langhorne	13	15	27	10	9	24	19	22	9	17	15	33
17	(United Kingdom) Phil Quaife	16	13	21	14	11	22	17	13	10	Ret	9	33
18	(Czech Republic) Jiří Janák	Ret	14	Ret	Ret	Ret	Ret	14	5	20	13	11	30
19	(France) Fabrice Walfisch	6	5	15	17								28
20	(Germany) Michael Schrey	Ret	10	12	16	Ret	Ret						16
21	(Germany) Marc Basseng							9	Ret	11	8		15
22	(Hong Kong) Darryl O'Young	10	Ret	20	15	21†	21	26	15	15	Ret	17	14
23	(Spain) Emilio de Villota Jr.	Ret	Ret	17		13	19	20	14	22†			12
24	(Netherlands) Robert van den Berg	15	18	26	13								6
25	(Switzerland) Marc Benz	Ret	12		9							20	4
26	(Finland) Mikael Forsten	18	Ret	24	20	Ret	26	22	23	16	16	18	4
27	(Netherlands) Paul van Splunteren	17	19	25	Ret	Ret	23		19	17	15	Ret	4
28	(Lithuania) Nemunas Dagilis			DNQ		17	DNQ						1
29	(Netherlands) Simon Frederiks	20	21	23	19		28	24	Ret	18	18	22	1
30	(Brazil) Alexandre Funari Negrão	Ret	17							19			0
31	(Netherlands) Menno Kuus			22	18								0
32	(Indonesia) Maher Algadri			DNQ	DNQ	18		25	DNQ		20	DNQ	0
33	(Netherlands) Michael Bleekemolen	19	20					21					0
34	(Lithuania) Andzej Dzikevic							Ret	20	21†	21		0
guest drivers ineligible for championship points
	(Austria) Martin Ragginger			9		5	10	Ret	Ret		7	5	0
	(Germany) Lance David Arnold			7		19	8	15	10		6	10	0
	(Spain) Miguel Ángel de Castro			10									0
	(United Kingdom) James Sutton						12						0
	(United Kingdom) Tim Harvey						13						0
	(Germany) René Rast							13					0
	(Netherlands) Bernard ten Brinke					14		23					0
	(Italy) Andrea Sonvico										14		0
	(United Kingdom) Steven Kane						15						0
	(Hungary) Norbert Kiss								16				0
	(Germany) Altfrid Heger											16	0
	(Germany) Frank Biela							18					0
	(Finland) Markus Palttala											19	0
	(Australia) Stuart Kostera	21	23										0
	(Germany) Oliver Freymuth								21				0
	(Belgium) Jürgen van Hover											21	0
	(Bahrain) Jaber Al-Khalifa	22	22										0
	(Netherlands) Phil Bastiaans											23†	0
	(Australia) Tim Macrow						25						0
	(United Kingdom) Derek Warwick						27						0
	(Germany) Hannes Plesse			Ret									0
	(Australia) Christian Jones									Ret			0
	(Austria) Jörg Peham							DNS					0
Pos	Driver	BHR (Bahrain)		CAT (Spain)	MON (Monaco)	MAG (France)	SIL (United Kingdom)	NÜR (Germany)	HUN (Hungary)	IST (Turkey)	MZA (Italy)	SPA (Belgium)	Points

Colour	Result
Gold	Winner
Silver	Second place
Bronze	Third place
Green	Points classification
Blue	Non-points classification
Blue	Non-classified finish (NC)
Purple	Retired, not classified (Ret)
Red	Did not qualify (DNQ)
Red	Did not pre-qualify (DNPQ)
Black	Disqualified (DSQ)
White	Did not start (DNS)
White	Withdrew (WD)
White	Race cancelled (C)
Blank	Did not practice (DNP)
Blank	Did not arrive (DNA)
Blank	Excluded (EX)

**Bold** – Pole
Italics – Fastest Lap

† — Drivers did not finish the race, but were classified as they completed over 90% of the race distance.

=== Teams' Championship ===
Pos	Team	BHR (Bahrain)		CAT (Spain)	MON (Monaco)	MAG (France)	SIL (United Kingdom)	NÜR (Germany)	HUN (Hungary)	IST (Turkey)	MZA (Italy)	SPA (Belgium)	Points
1	(Austria) Lechner Racing Team Bahrain	1	3	4	6	4	5	4	3	2	1	3	249
1	(Austria) Lechner Racing Team Bahrain	3	4	6	22	12	17	5	7	7	Ret	Ret	249
2	(Germany) HISAQ Competition	4	2	1	3	3	18	3	1	4	2	6	202
2	(Germany) HISAQ Competition	Ret	10	12	16	Ret	Ret	9	Ret	11	8	23†	202
3	(Germany) tolimit	7	7	3	7	2	1	2	6	6	5	14	173
3	(Germany) tolimit	Ret	8	8	Ret	20	3	11	Ret	Ret	19	Ret	173
4	(United Kingdom) Team Irwin SAS	5	6	14	8	6	4	7	11	12	4	4	140
4	(United Kingdom) Team Irwin SAS	14	Ret	18	21	10	16	16	17	Ret	10	12	140
5	(Germany) SPS Performance	2	1	Ret	4	1	6	10	18	3	3	13	136
5	(Germany) SPS Performance	Ret	12	DNQ	9	17	DNQ	Ret	20	21†	21	20	136
6	(Austria) Konrad Motorsport	8	Ret	2	2	7	2	12	14	14	12	1	119
6	(Austria) Konrad Motorsport	Ret	Ret	17	20	13	19	20	Ret	22†	14	19	119
7	(Netherlands) Golden Spike Pertamina Indonesia Racing Team PZ Essen	6	5	15	17	18	7	1	2	1	20	2	111
7	(Netherlands) Golden Spike Pertamina Indonesia Racing Team PZ Essen	21	23	DNQ	DNQ	Ret	25	25	DNQ	Ret	Ret	DNQ	111
8	(Netherlands) Bleekemolen Race Planet PZ Essen	11	9	5	1	15	11	6	4	13	11	24†	109
8	(Netherlands) Bleekemolen Race Planet PZ Essen	19	20	11	5	16	20	21	21	Ret	Ret	Ret	109
9	(Netherlands) Racing Team Indonesia PZ Essen RA Beheer	9	11	19	11	8	22	8	12	10	9	8	87
9	(Netherlands) Racing Team Indonesia PZ Essen RA Beheer	16	13	21	14	11	Ret	17	13	Ret	Ret	9	87
10	(Germany) MRS-Team PZ Aschaffenburg	13	15	13	10	9	14	19	9	8	17	7	66
10	(Germany) MRS-Team PZ Aschaffenburg	Ret	16	27	Ret	DSQ	24	Ret	22	9	Ret	15	66
11	(Austria) Lechner Racing School Team	12	22	16	12	Ret	9	22	8	5	16	18	42
11	(Austria) Lechner Racing School Team	22	Ret	24		Ret	26	DNS	23	16	Ret	Ret	42
12	(Germany) Schnabel Engineering-LKM-Team Jebsen	10	14	20	15	21†	21	14	5	15	13	11	41
12	(Germany) Schnabel Engineering-LKM-Team Jebsen	Ret	Ret	Ret	Ret	Ret	Ret	26	15	20	Ret	17	41
13	(Netherlands) HSF / Porsche Centrum Eindhoven	17	19	23	19	14	23	23	19	17	15	22	6
13	(Netherlands) HSF / Porsche Centrum Eindhoven	20	21	25	Ret	Ret	28	25	Ret	18	18	Ret	6
Guest teams ineligible for championship points
	(Germany) UPS Porsche Junior Team			7		5	8	15	10		6	5	0
	(Germany) UPS Porsche Junior Team			9		19	10	Ret	Ret		7	10	0
	(Germany) Porsche AG			10			27	18	16			16	0
	(United Kingdom) Porsche Cars Great Britain						12						0
	(United Kingdom) Porsche Cars Great Britain						13						0
	(Netherlands) Harders Plaza Racing	15	18	22	13								0
	(Netherlands) Harders Plaza Racing			26	18								0
	(Belgium) Bongou/Speedlover/Duindistel											21	0
Pos	Team	BHR (Bahrain)		CAT (Spain)	MON (Monaco)	MAG (France)	SIL (United Kingdom)	NÜR (Germany)	HUN (Hungary)	IST (Turkey)	MZA (Italy)	SPA (Belgium)	Points
