= Redline Racing =

(United Kingdom) Redline Racing
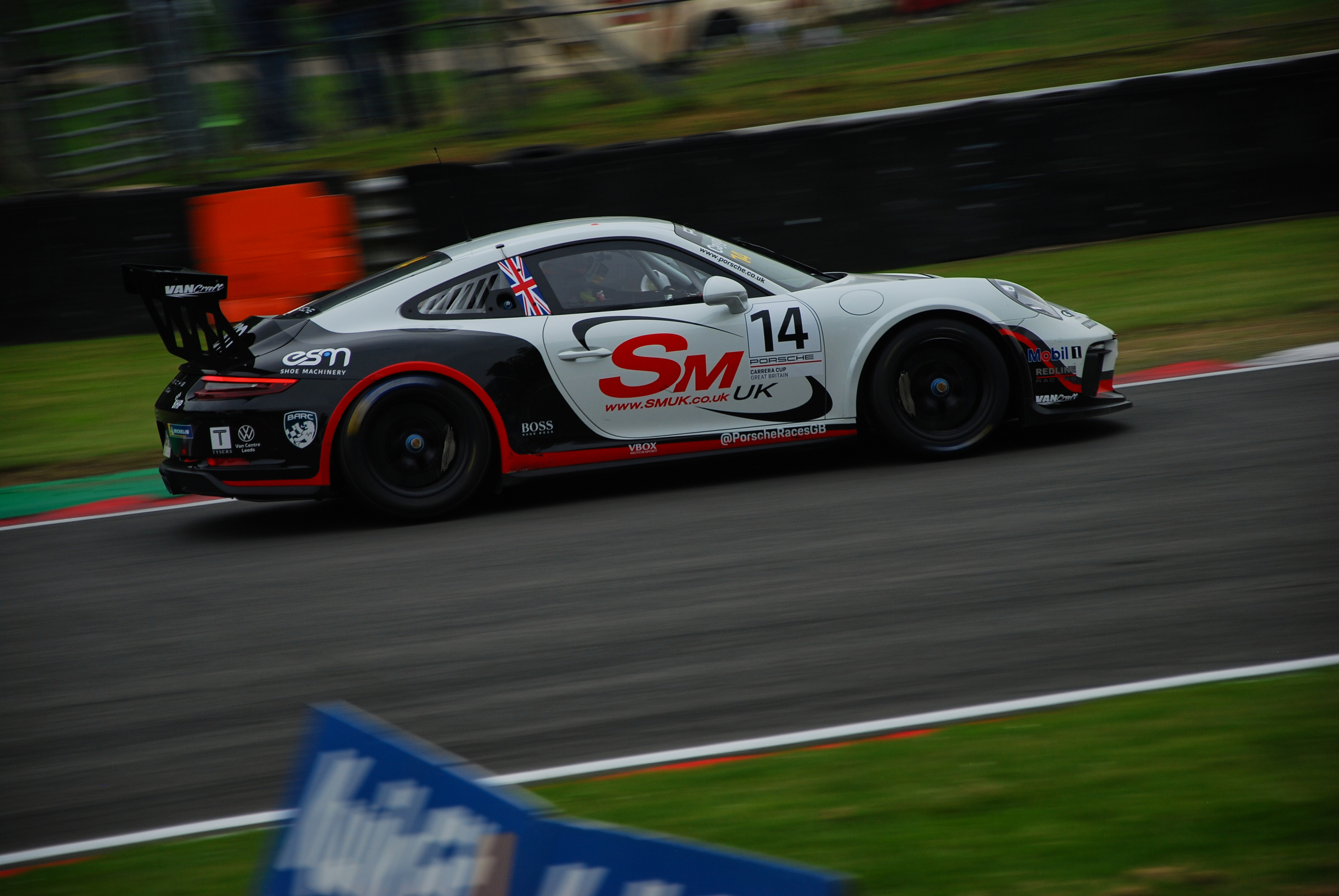
- Founded: 1995
- Team principal(s): Simon Leonard
- Current series: Porsche Carrera Cup GB
- Former series: Michelin Porsche Cup; Porsche Supercup
- Current drivers: (United Kingdom) Jamie Orton (Argentina) Dorian Mansilla
- Teams' Championships: Porsche Carrera Cup Great Britain; 2004, 2007, 2008, 2010, 2011, 2012
- Drivers' Championships: Porsche Carrera Cup Great Britain; 2004 – Richard Westbrook; 2007 – James Sutton; 2008 – Tim Harvey; 2010 – Tim Harvey; 2011 – James Sutton; 2012 – Michael Meadows; 2014 – Josh Webster; 2015 – Dan Cammish; 2016 – Dan Cammish; 2017 – Charlie Eastwood

Tim Harvey (centre) and James Sutton (right) on the Podium at Brands Hatch, April 2007

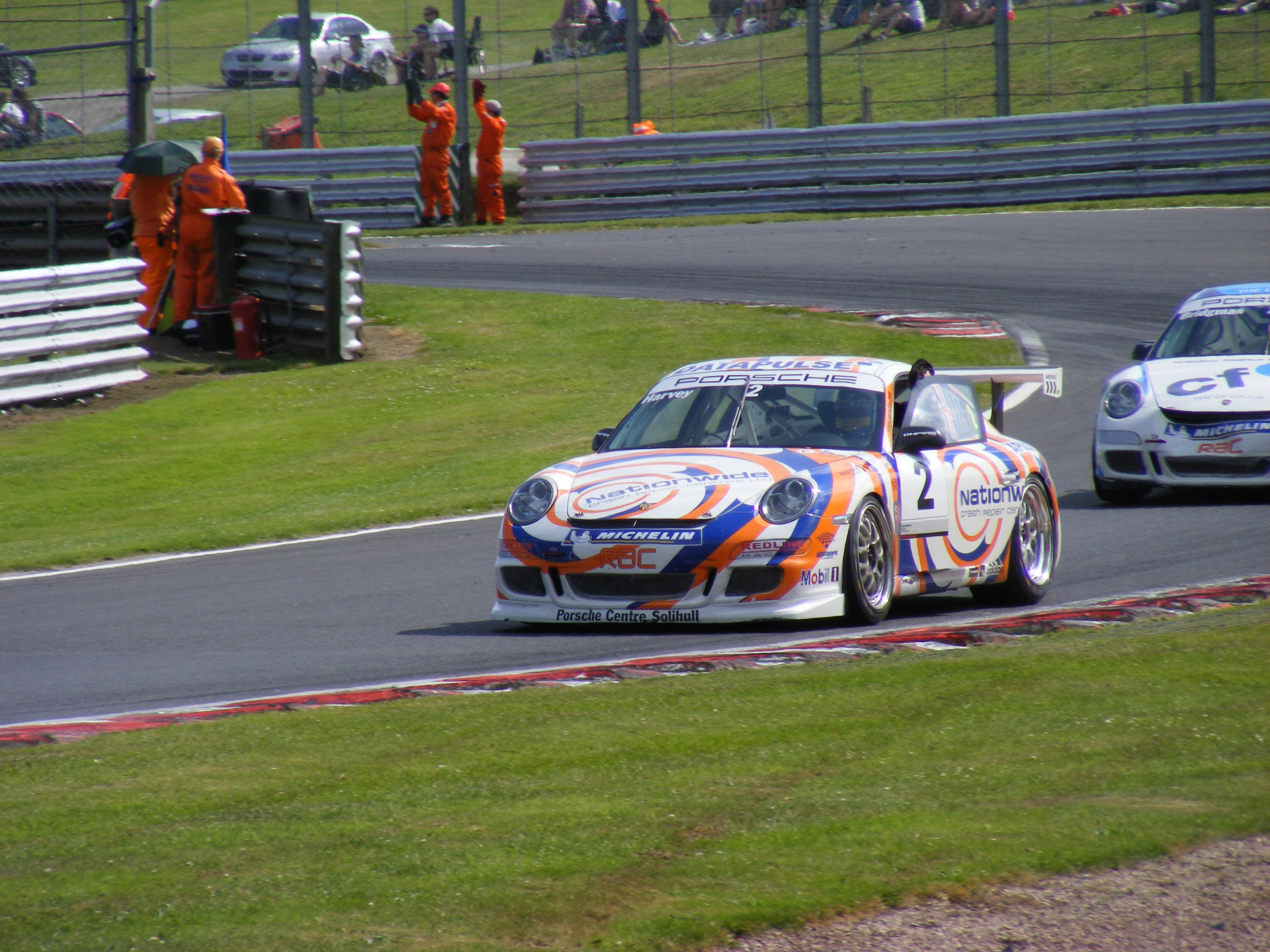
Tim Harvey waves to the Oulton Park crowd after taking second place during round 13 of the 2008 Porsche Carrera Cup Great Britain

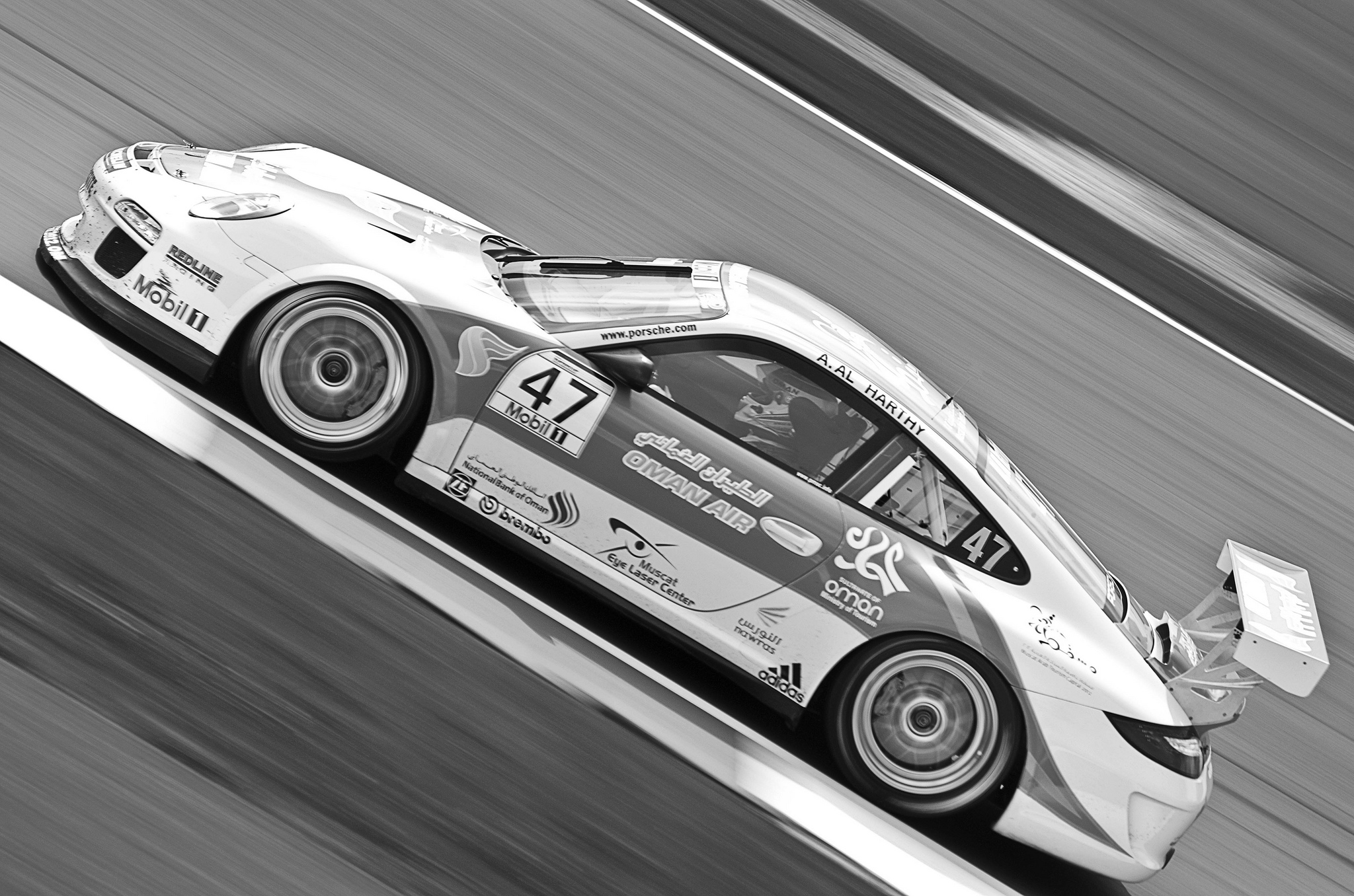
Oman Air sponsored Porsche 997 GT3 Cup of Redline Racing competing in the 2012 Porsche Supercup season

Redline Racing is a British racing team that is currently competing in the Porsche Carrera Cup Great Britain and are defending team and drivers champions. They have previously competed in the Porsche Supercup between 2007 and 2008.

== Early history ==
Redline Racing, established in 1995, made its first entry in the arena of motorsport racing in April 1997 by competing in the Michelin Porsche Cup. Having a 4-year racing experience Redline Racing entered the British National Porsche Carrera Cup in 2001, racing Porsche GT3s. They finished in second place in the championship that year and they repeated that success in 2003 and also 2005.

== Porsche Carrera Cup GB ==
Redline Racing joined the newly formed Porsche Carrera Cup Great Britain in its 2003 début season and has been one of the most successful teams in the championship, winning six teams' titles and six drivers' titles.

Their first championship success came in 2004 when after a long and difficult racing season, they conquered first place and won the team championship for the first time along with driver Richard Westbrook who won the driver's championship.

Their form continued, with the team narrowly missing out on championship spoils in 2005 and 2006 when Redline's driver lineup consisted of Nigel Rice, Jason Young and Faithless lead singer Maxi Jazz along with regular star Richard Westbrook racing in the Team Irwin sponsored car. However, due to Westbrook's Supercup commitments the car was handed over to Danny Watts who, initially, substituted for Redline in the races Westbrook could not attend. Ultimately, Watts finished third in the championship with ten wins out of 16 starts, the most wins of the season.

The 2007 season was another big year for the team after securing the drive of 1992 British Touring Car champion Tim Harvey from rivals Motorbase Performance and Formula Renault UK race-winner James Sutton to join Pro-Am vice champion Nigel Rice and Maxi Jazz, the team managed to secure the double by winning the Teams' championship and Sutton winning the drivers' crown. The Pro-Am championship was dominated by Nigel Rice, who won 14 Pro-Am race wins and 17 podiums out of a possible 20. The feat was repeated in 2008 with Harvey taking the drivers championship after five wins over the season.

A lull in 2009 where Sutton missed out on championship glory by four points after missing the opening round of the championship, spurred the team on to dominate 2010, 2011 and 2012 championships, winning both drivers' and teams' title each time.

For the 2013 campaign, Redline brought in 2010 FIA Formula Two Championship champion Dean Stoneman to lead the team. Stoneman, who is making his racing return after being diagnosed with testicular cancer in 2011, is currently third in the championship at the half way point of the season with three wins to his name.

== Porsche Supercup ==
During 2007, Redline Racing moved into the Porsche Supercup under the title banner of Team IRWIN SAS (title sponsorship coming from Irwin Industrial Tools and SAS Group). David Saelens and Marc Hynes were the team's driver, finishing in sixth and eleventh place respectively in the overall standings.

The team continued into 2008 season, this time under the Team IRWIN banner. Hynes was replaced with Patrick Huisman who outperformed Saelens to finish fourth in the championship (Saelens only managing 12th place in the final standings).

The team didn't return to contest the 2009 season and since then has only made an annual appearance in 2011 and 2012 at the British leg of the championship, with little success.

== Race results ==
=== Partial Porsche Carrera Cup GB ===
| Year | Car | Drivers | Wins | Poles | Fast laps | Points | D.C. | T.C. |
|---|---|---|---|---|---|---|---|---|
| 2005 | Porsche 996 | (United Kingdom) Richard Westbrook | 14 | 8 | 11 | 331 | 2nd | 2nd |
| 2005 | Porsche 996 | (United Kingdom) Nigel Rice | 0 | 0 | 0 | 217 | 5th | 2nd |
| 2005 | Porsche 996 | (United Kingdom) Stephen Shanly | 0 | 0 | 0 | 176 | 6th | 2nd |
| 2005 | Porsche 996 | (United Kingdom) Jason Young | 0 | 0 | 0 | 138 | 8th | 2nd |
| 2006 | Porsche 997 (1st Gen.) as Team IRWIN | (United Kingdom) Danny Watts | 10 | 6 | 6 | 250 | 3rd | 3rd |
| 2006 | Porsche 997 (1st Gen.) as Team IRWIN | (United Kingdom) Richard Westbrook | 3 | 0 | 2 | 64 | 14th | 3rd |
| 2006 | Porsche 997 (1st Gen.) as Redline Racing | (United Kingdom) Nigel Rice | 0 | 0 | 0 | 144 | 9th | 3rd |
| 2006 | Porsche 997 (1st Gen.) as Redline Racing | (United Kingdom) Jason Young | 0 | 0 | 0 | 87 | 13th | 3rd |
| 2006 | Porsche 997 (1st Gen.) as Redline Racing | (United Kingdom) Maxi Jazz | 0 | 0 | 0 | 26 | 19th | 3rd |
| 2007 | Porsche 997 (1st Gen.) | (United Kingdom) James Sutton | 6 | 4 | 5 | 328 | 1st | 1st |
| 2007 | Porsche 997 (1st Gen.) | (United Kingdom) Tim Harvey | 5 | 2 | 5 | 324 | 2nd | 1st |
| 2007 | Porsche 997 (1st Gen.) | (United Kingdom) Nigel Rice | 0 | 0 | 0 | 186 | 6th | 1st |
| 2007 | Porsche 997 (1st Gen.) | (United Kingdom) Maxi Jazz | 0 | 0 | 0 | 22 | 15th | 1st |
| 2008 | Porsche 997 (1st Gen.) | (United Kingdom) Tim Harvey | 4 | 3 | 5 | 340 | 1st | 1st |
| 2008 | Porsche 997 (1st Gen.) | (United Kingdom) Fergus Campbell | 0 | 0 | 0 | 27 | 13th | 1st |
| 2008 | Porsche 997 (1st Gen.) | (United Kingdom) Andy Neate | 0 | 0 | 0 | 8 | 24th | 1st |
| 2008 | Porsche 997 (1st Gen.) | (United Kingdom) Ray MacDowall | 0 | 0 | 0 | 5 | 25th | 1st |
| 2009 | Porsche 997 (1st Gen.) | (United Kingdom) James Sutton | 6 | 3 | 5 | 320 | 2nd | 2nd |
| 2009 | Porsche 997 (1st Gen.) | (United Kingdom) Tim Harvey | 3 | 2 | 2 | 316 | 3rd | 2nd |
| 2009 | Porsche 997 (1st Gen.) | (United Kingdom) Tony Gilham | 0 | 0 | 0 | 141 | 9th | 2nd |
| 2009 | Porsche 997 (1st Gen.) | (United Kingdom) Lewis Hopkins | 0 | 0 | 0 | 92 | 10th | 2nd |
| 2009 | Porsche 997 (1st Gen.) | (United Kingdom) Dean Smith | 0 | 0 | 0 | 26 | 19th | 2nd |
| 2010 | Porsche 997 (1st Gen.) | (United Kingdom) Tim Harvey | 11 | 9 | 4 | 370 | 1st | 1st |
| 2010 | Porsche 997 (1st Gen.) | (United Kingdom) Michael Meadows | 0 | 0 | 0 | 148 | 8th | 1st |
| 2010 | Porsche 997 (1st Gen.) | (Oman) Ahmad Al Harthy | 0 | 0 | 0 | 106 | 11th | 1st |
| 2010 | Porsche 997 (1st Gen.) | (United Kingdom) Archie Hamilton | 0 | 0 | 0 | 69 | 13th | 1st |
| 2010 | Porsche 997 (1st Gen.) | (United Kingdom) Glenn McMenamin | 0 | 0 | 0 | 28 | 15th | 1st |
| 2010 | Porsche 997 (1st Gen.) | (United Kingdom) Andrew Shelley | 0 | 0 | 0 | 22 | 17th | 1st |
| 2010 | Porsche 997 (1st Gen.) | (United Kingdom) James Sutton | 0 | 0 | 0 | 0 | G | 1st |
| 2010 | Porsche 997 (1st Gen.) | (Turkey) Yücel Özbek | 0 | 0 | 0 | 0 | G | 1st |
| 2011 | Porsche 997 (2nd Gen.) as SAS Redline Racing | (United Kingdom) James Sutton | 3 | 3 | 4 | 305 | 1st | 1st |
| 2011 | Porsche 997 (2nd Gen.) as SAS Redline Racing | (United Kingdom) Michael Meadows | 2 | 5 | 3 | 298 | 2nd | 1st |
| 2011 | Porsche 997 (2nd Gen.) as Redline Racing | (United Kingdom) Benji Hetherington | 0 | 0 | 0 | 132 | 8th | 1st |
| 2011 | Porsche 997 (2nd Gen.) as Redline Racing | (Turkey) Yücel Özbek | 0 | 0 | 0 | 11 | 22nd | 1st |
| 2011 | Porsche 997 (2nd Gen.) as Redline Racing | (United Kingdom) Keith Webster | 0 | 0 | 0 | 9 | 24th | 1st |
| 2011 | Porsche 997 (2nd Gen.) as Redline Racing | (United Kingdom) Andrew Shelley | 0 | 0 | 0 | 6 | 26th | 1st |
| 2011 | Porsche 997 (2nd Gen.) as Redline Oman Air | (Oman) Ahmad Al Harthy | 0 | 0 | 0 | 95 | 10th | 1st |
| 2012 | Porsche 997 (2nd Gen.) | (United Kingdom) Michael Meadows | 6 | 8 | 2 | 320 | 1st | 1st |
| 2012 | Porsche 997 (2nd Gen.) | (Oman) Ahmad Al Harthy | 0 | 0 | 0 | 143 | 8th | 1st |
| 2012 | Porsche 997 (2nd Gen.) | (United Kingdom) Glynn Geddie | 0 | 0 | 0 | 105 | 10th | 1st |
| 2012 | Porsche 997 (2nd Gen.) | (Spain) Víctor Jiménez | 0 | 0 | 0 | 92 | 12th | 1st |
| 2012 | Porsche 997 (2nd Gen.) | (United Kingdom) James Sutton | 0 | 0 | 0 | 55 | 14th | 1st |
| 2012 | Porsche 997 (2nd Gen.) | (United Kingdom) Keith Webster | 0 | 0 | 0 | 36 | 15th | 1st |
| 2012 | Porsche 997 (2nd Gen.) | (Turkey) Yücel Özbek | 0 | 0 | 0 | 34 | 16th | 1st |
| 2013 | Porsche 997 (2nd Gen.) | (United Kingdom) Dean Stoneman | 5 | 2 | 4 | 231 | 5th | ? |
| 2013 | Porsche 997 (2nd Gen.) | (Spain) Víctor Jiménez | 0 | 0 | 0 | 194 | 6th | ? |
| 2013 | Porsche 997 (2nd Gen.) | (United Kingdom) Dan de Zille | 0 | 0 | 0 | 160 | 7th | ? |
| 2013 | Porsche 997 (2nd Gen.) | (Turkey) Yücel Özbek | 0 | 0 | 0 | 25 | 14th | ? |
| 2013 | Porsche 997 (2nd Gen.) | (United Kingdom) George Wright | 0 | 0 | 0 | 20 | 15th | ? |
| 2013 | Porsche 997 (2nd Gen.) | (South Africa) Kyle Barnes | 0 | 0 | 0 | 14 | 19th | ? |

=== Porsche Supercup ===
| Year | Car | Drivers | Wins | Poles | Fast laps | Points | D.C. | T.C. |
|---|---|---|---|---|---|---|---|---|
| 2007 | Porsche 997 as Team IRWIN SAS | (Belgium) David Saelens | 0 | 0 | 0 | 96 | 6th | |
| 2007 | Porsche 997 as Team IRWIN SAS | (United Kingdom) Marc Hynes | 0 | 0 | 0 | 48 | 11th | |
| 2008 | Porsche 997 as IRWIN Racing | (Netherlands) Patrick Huisman | 0 | 0 | 0 | 98 | 4th | |
| 2008 | Porsche 997 as IRWIN Racing | (Belgium) David Saelens | 0 | 0 | 0 | 73 | 12th | |
| 2011 | Porsche 997 as SAS International | (United Kingdom) James Sutton | 0 | 0 | 0 | N/A | G | |
| 2011 | Porsche 997 as SAS International | (United Kingdom) Michael Meadows | 0 | 0 | 0 | N/A | G | |
| 2012 | Porsche 997 | (United Kingdom) Glynn Geddie | 0 | 0 | 0 | N/A | G | |
| 2012 | Porsche 997 | (Oman) Ahmad Al Harthy | 0 | 0 | 0 | N/A | G | |
