= Adam Fleetwood =

British racing driver

Adam Fleetwood is a British racing driver. He won the British Hillclimb Championship in both 2003 and 2004 driving a Gould GR55, and in the latter year won an unprecedented 28 of the 34 rounds of the series. In the process he broke all but one outright hill records, and became the first driver to complete the Shelsley Walsh course in under 24 seconds. However, his main rival, Graeme Wight Jr, did not compete at all (one or two guest appearances in other cars aside) in the second half of the 2004 season. As he was awaiting completion of a new car, which did not become available by the end of the season.

Before making the step up to the top category of hillclimbing, Fleetwood had previously competed with distinction in smaller-engined single-seater cars, setting several class records in the process.

In April 2005, Fleetwood announced that family and other commitments (such as his preparation for competing in the British Porsche Carrera Cup) would preclude his appearance in the rest of that season's championship, although in the end he did compete in a small number of climbs.

Sporting positions
Preceded by Graeme Wight, Jr.	British Hill Climb Champion; 2003-2004	Succeeded by Martin Groves
