= Michael Caine (racing driver) =

British racing driver (born 1969)

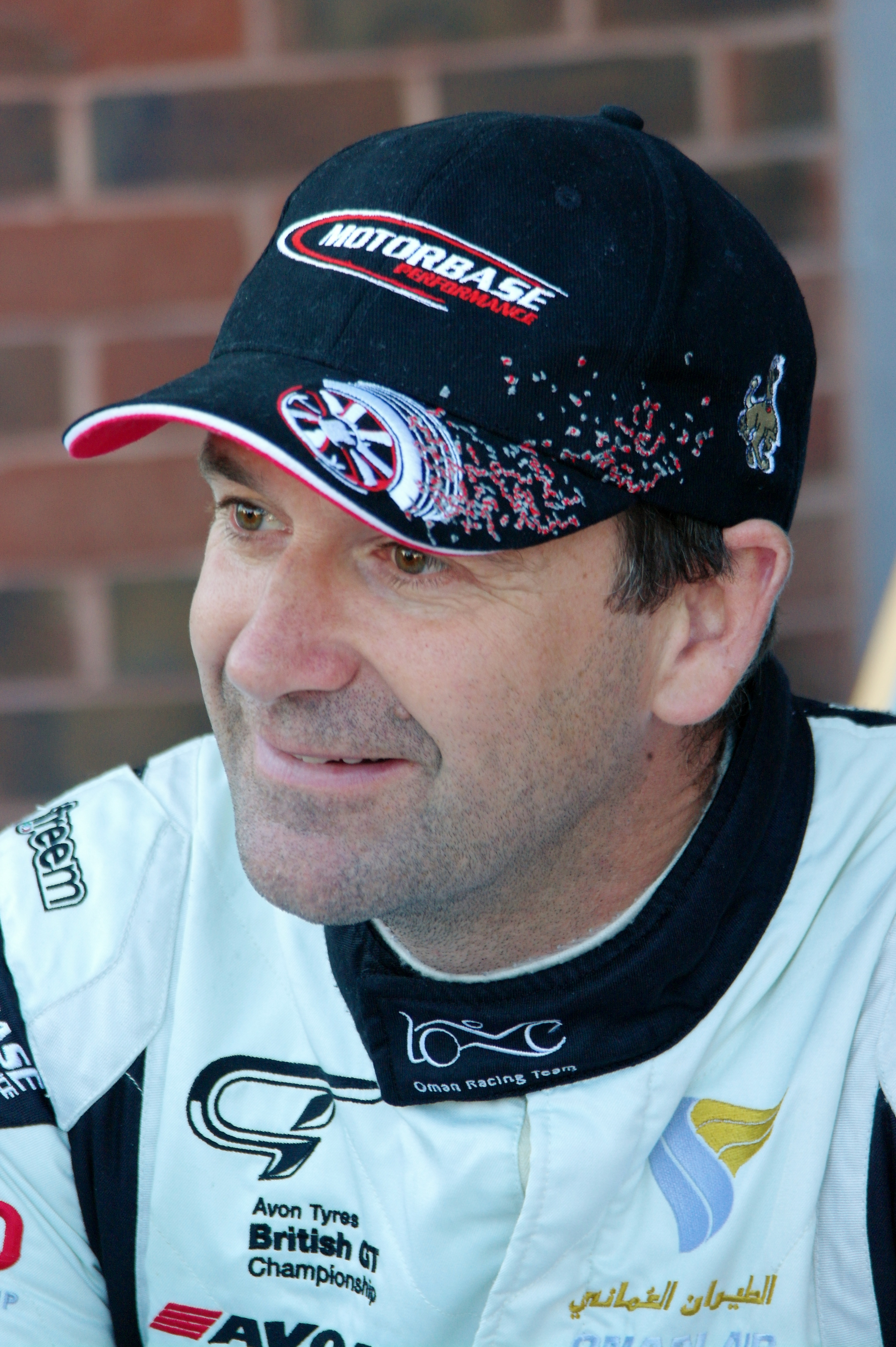
- Caine at the Brands Hatch round of the 2014 British GT Championship season
- Nationality: British
- Born: Michael Charles Caine; 13 August 1969 (age 57) Cambridge, England

British Touring Car Championship career
- Debut season: 2011
- Current team: Pro Alloy with Motorbase
- Categorisation: FIA Silver
- Car number: 44
- Former teams: Team HARD
- Starts: 34
- Wins: 0
- Poles: 0
- Fastest laps: 0
- Best finish: 22nd in 2013

Previous series
- 2012–14, 17 2006–11: British GT Championship; Porsche Carrera Cup GB

Championship titles
- 2012: British GT Championship

Michael Charles Caine (born 13 August 1969 in Cambridge) is a British racing driver. He currently competes in the British GT Championship and the British Touring Car Championship. He was the 2012 British GT champion along with Daniele Perfetti.

== Racing career ==
=== British Touring Car Championship ===
Caine made his British Touring Car Championship debut for Airwaves Racing at Rockingham in 2011, where he competed for two rounds, scoring a point on his debut.

Caine returned to the BTCC for the 2013 season, beginning with the fifth round of the championship at Croft, where he would drive a Ford Focus Mk.III ST for Addison Lee Motorbase. Caine returned to the BTCC with Team HARD in 2016 replacing Chris Smiley. On 3 January 2018, Caine was announced as the fourth driver with Team HARD for the 2018 season of the British Touring Car Championship. On 27 September 2019, it was announced that Caine would be replacing Nicolas Hamilton at Motorbase for the remaining two rounds of the season.

=== British GT Championship ===
Caine has previously competed in series such as the Porsche Carrera Cup Great Britain and the British GT Championship. For 2012, he returned to the British GT Championship with Motorbase in a Porsche 911 GT3R.

Caine stayed in the championship for 2013, now paired with Ahmad Al Harthy. Caine remained with Motorbase Performance for the 2014 season, now racing an Aston Martin Vantage GT3 alongside Al Harthy in the British GT Championship and with Al Harthy and Stephen Jelley in the Blancpain Endurance Series.

== Racing record ==
=== 24 Hours of Le Mans results ===
Year	Team	Co-Drivers	Car	Class	Laps	Pos.	Class Pos.
2003	(United Kingdom) DeWalt Racesports Salisbury	(United Kingdom) Mike Jordan (United Kingdom) Tim Sugden	TVR Tuscan T400R	GT	93	DNF	DNF
2004	(United Kingdom) Chamberlain-Synergy Motorsport	(United Kingdom) Bob Berridge (United Kingdom) Chris Stockton	TVR Tuscan T400R	GT	300	21st	8th

=== Britcar 24 Hour results ===
Year	Team	Co-Drivers	Car	Car No.	Class	Laps	Pos.	Class Pos.
2007	(United Kingdom) Trackpower Motorsport	(United Kingdom) Richard Hay (United Kingdom) Richard Stanton (United Kingdom) Stuart Turvey	TVR Sagaris	16	GT3	30	DNF	DNF

=== Complete British Touring Car Championship results ===
(key) (Races in bold indicate pole position – 1 point awarded in first race) (Races in italics indicate fastest lap – 1 point awarded all races) (* signifies that driver lead race for at least one lap – 1 point awarded all races)

Year	Team	Car	1	2	3	4	5	6	7	8	9	10	11	12	13	14	15	16	17	18	19	20	21	22	23	24	25	26	27	28	29	30	DC	Pts
2011	Airwaves Racing	Ford Focus ST	BRH; 1	BRH; 2	BRH; 3	DON; 1	DON; 2	DON; 3	THR; 1	THR; 2	THR; 3	OUL; 1	OUL; 2	OUL; 3	CRO; 1	CRO; 2	CRO; 3	SNE; 1	SNE; 2	SNE; 3	KNO; 1	KNO; 2	KNO; 3	ROC; 1; 10	ROC; 2 Ret	ROC; 3; 20	BRH; 1; 12	BRH; 2; 12	BRH; 3; 12	SIL; 1	SIL; 2	SIL; 3	23rd	1
2013	Addison Lee Racing	Ford Focus ST Mk.III	BRH; 1	BRH; 2	BRH; 3	DON; 1	DON; 2	DON; 3	THR; 1	THR; 2	THR; 3	OUL; 1	OUL; 2	OUL; 3	CRO; 1; 8	CRO; 2 Ret	CRO; 3 DNS	SNE; 1	SNE; 2	SNE; 3	KNO; 1	KNO; 2	KNO; 3	ROC; 1	ROC; 2	ROC; 3	SIL; 1	SIL; 2	SIL; 3	BRH; 1	BRH; 2	BRH; 3	22nd	8
2016	TLC Racing	Toyota Avensis	BRH; 1	BRH; 2	BRH; 3	DON; 1	DON; 2	DON; 3	THR; 1	THR; 2	THR; 3	OUL; 1	OUL; 2	OUL; 3	CRO; 1	CRO; 2	CRO; 3	SNE; 1; 18	SNE; 2 Ret	SNE; 3 DNS	KNO; 1; 24	KNO; 2 DNS	KNO; 3 DNS	ROC; 1	ROC; 2	ROC; 3	SIL; 1	SIL; 2	SIL; 3	BRH; 1	BRH; 2	BRH; 3	33rd	0
2018	Team HARD. with Trade Price Cars	Volkswagen CC	BRH; 1; 21	BRH; 2; 24	BRH; 3; 24	DON; 1; 24	DON; 2; 27	DON; 3; 19	THR; 1 Ret	THR; 2 Ret	THR; 3; 25	OUL; 1; 29	OUL; 2; 22	OUL; 3; 19	CRO; 1; 23	CRO; 2 NC	CRO; 3; 27	SNE; 1; 19	SNE; 2 Ret	SNE; 3 DNS	ROC; 1; 20	ROC; 2 Ret	ROC; 3 Ret	KNO; 1	KNO; 2	KNO; 3	SIL; 1	SIL; 2	SIL; 3	BRH; 1	BRH; 2	BRH; 3	36th	0
2019	Motorbase Performance	Ford Focus RS	BRH; 1	BRH; 2	BRH; 3	DON; 1	DON; 2	DON; 3	THR; 1	THR; 2	THR; 3	CRO; 1	CRO; 2	CRO; 3	OUL; 1	OUL; 2	OUL; 3	SNE; 1	SNE; 2	SNE; 3	THR; 1	THR; 2	THR; 3	KNO; 1	KNO; 2	KNO; 3	SIL; 1; 20	SIL; 2; 12	SIL; 3; 18	BRH; 1; 12	BRH; 2; 8	BRH; 3; 17	25th	16

=== Partial British GT Championship results ===
(key) (Races in bold indicate pole position) (Races in italics indicate fastest lap)

Year	Team	Car	Class	1	2	3	4	5	6	7	8	9	10	11	12	13	14	15	16	Pos	Points
1999	Promotasport	Marcos Mantis	INV	SIL; 1	OUL; 1	SNE; 1	BRH; 1	SIL; 1; 23	DON; 1	DON; 2	SIL; 1	CRO; 1	SPA; 1	SIL; 1						NC†	0†
2001	TVR Motorsport	TVR Cerbera Speed 12	GT	SIL; 1; 5	SNE; 1; 15	DON; 1; 3	OUL; 1; 3	CRO; 1; 2	**ROC**; **1**; 1	**CAS**; **1**; 2	BRH; 1; 1	DON; 1; 2	KNO; 1; 8	THR; 1 Ret	BRH; 1; 13	SIL; 1; 2				3rd	81
2002	TVR Engineering	TVR Cerbera Speed 12	GT	BRH; 1 Ret	DON; 1; 2	SIL; 1; 2	KNO; 1; 3	CRO; 1; 3	SIL; 1; 18	CAS; 1 Ret	ROC; 1; 4	OUL; 1; 2	SNE; 1; 3	THR; 1; 4	DON; 1; 3					?	59
2003	DeWalt Racesports	TVR Tuscan T400R	GTO	DON; 1	SNE; 1 DNA	KNO; 1	SIL; 1 DNA	CAS; 1; 1	OUL; 1	ROC; 1	THR; 1	SPA; 1; 9	BRH; 1 Ret							?	16
2004	JWR/Chambers Runfold plc	Porsche 996 GT3 Cup	GT Cup	DON; 1	DON; 2	MON; 1	MON; 2	SNE; 1	SNE; 2	CAS; 1	CAS; 2	OUL; 1 Ret	OUL; 2; 15	SIL; 1 Ret	SIL; 2; 2	THR; 1; 15	THR; 2; 12	BRH; 1 WD	BRH; 2 WD	13th	22
2004	RSR Racing	TVR Tuscan T400R	N-GT															BRH; 1 DNS	BRH; 2 Ret	NC	0
2012	Motorbase Performance	Porsche 997 GT3-R	GT3	OUL; 1; 6	OUL; 2; 4	NUR; 1; 2	NUR; 2; 3	ROC; 1; 13	BRH; 1 Ret	SNE; 1; 2	SNE; 2; 5	SIL; 1; 3	DON; 1; 4							1st	130.5
2013	Oman Air Motorbase	Porsche 997 GT3-R	GT3	OUL; 1; 4	OUL; 2; 9	ROC; 1; 6	SIL; 1; 8	SNE; 1; 1	SNE; 2; 8	BRH; 1; 7	**ZAN**; **1**; 1	ZAN; 2; 9	DON; 1; 12							5th	97
2014	Oman Racing Team	Aston Martin V12 Vantage GT3	GT3	**OUL**; **1**; 1	OUL; 2; 7	ROC; 1; 10	SIL; 1; 1	SNE; 1; 8	SNE; 2; 12	SPA; 1; 2	SPA; 2; 10	BRH; 1; 2	**DON**; **1**; 4							2nd	138
2017	Autoaid/RCIB Insurance Racing	Ginetta G55 GT4	GT4	OUL; 1 DNS	OUL; 2 DNS	ROC; 1	SNE; 1; 26	SNE; 2; 18	SIL; 1	SPA; 1	SPA; 2	BRH; 1	DON; 1							26th	2

^{†} As Caine was a guest driver, he was ineligible for points.
