= Tim Bridgman =

British racing driver (born 1985)

- Nationality: (United Kingdom) British
- Born: Timothy James Bridgman; 24 May 1985 (age 41) Harlow, England
- Categorisation: FIA Silver (until 2026); FIA Bronze (2027–)

Previous series
- 2020; 2018; 2017; 2011; 2010; 2008-2009; 2007; 2006; 2005; 2005; 2004; 2003; 2002-2003: British GT Championship; British LMP3 Cup; Blancpain GT Asia; British GT Championship; Porsche Supercup; Porsche Carrera Cup GB; Formula Palmer Audi; Formula Atlantic; Porsche Carrera Cup GB; British F3; Formula BMW UK; Formula Renault UK Winter Series; Zip Formula Great Britain

Championship titles
- 2009; 2007; 2004; 2003: Porsche Carrera Cup GB; Formula Palmer Audi; Formula BMW UK; Zip Formula Great Britain

Awards
- 2010; 2004: BRDC Superstar; BRDC Rising Star

Timothy James Bridgman (born 24 May 1985) is a British racing driver from England.

== Career ==
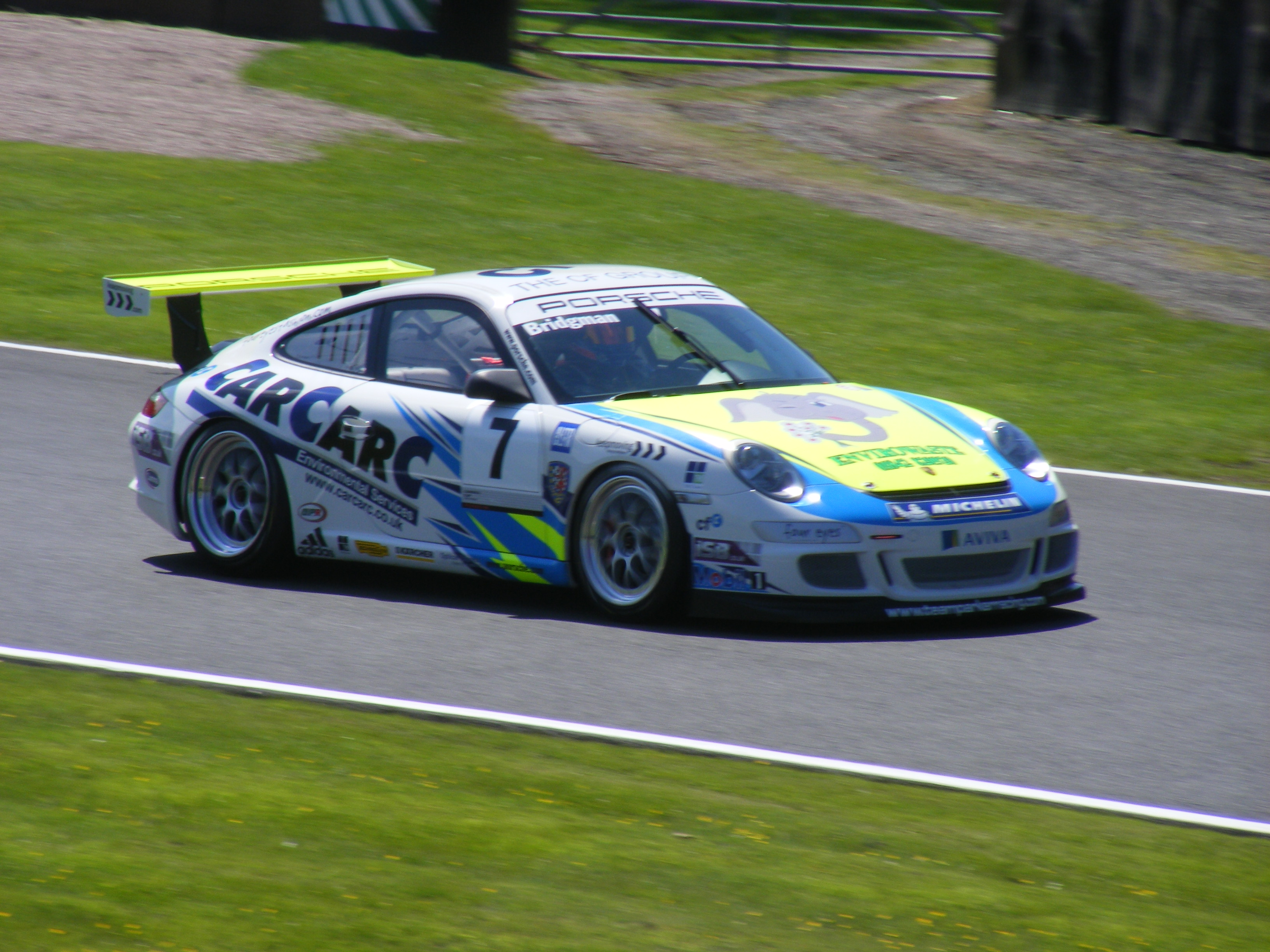
Bridgman competing in the 2009 Porsche Carrera Cup GB

Bridgman began karting in 2001, and shortly after gained his racing licence joining the Zip Formula Series in 2002. He would go on to win Zip Formula the championship in 2003, before joining Formula BMW UK. Bridgman won the inaugural championship of the one-make series with three wins and scoring a total of 230 points. He was nominated for the McLaren Autosport BRDC Young Driver of the Year award and awarded a BRDC Rising Star in the same year. Bridgman tested a British F3 car for Carlin, ultimately though he joined Hitech GP for the 2005 British F3 Championship. Bridgman finished 15th with 16 points overall. Bridgman was forced to miss the Mondello Park race due to injuries in a house fire.

Bridgman left the UK and spent the 2006 season racing in the United States for Jensen Motorsport in Champ Car Formula Atlantic. He would return to the UK for 2007 to race in Formula Palmer Audi. Bridgman would go on to win the 2007 FPA title.

Bridgman joined the Porsche Carrera Cup GB in 2008, and would go on to win the 2009 title in a final-day three-way battle with James Sutton and Tim Harvey. He would move on to the Porsche Supercup series for 2010.

Returning to Britain for 2011, Bridgman joined Trackspeed to race a Porsche 911 GT3 alongside Gregor Fisken for the 2011 British GT season. The pair would win one race at Brands Hatch. on their way to seventh overall in the championship. Trackspeed won the team title for the year despite Bridgman and Fisken finishing seventh in the overall championship.

After a hiatus from racing, Bridgman returned to the 2017 Blancpain GT Series Asia series with HubAuto. He competed in two races at Shanghai and Zhejiang. Bridgman would be drafted in to the opening round of the British LMP3 Championship for 360 Racing deputising for Jason Rishover. Bridgman's most recent competitive race came in the 2020 British GT Championship where he joined Karl Leonard to race a GTC class Porsche for Team Parker Racing for the season finale at Silverstone.

== Personal life ==
Bridgman was born in Harlow and educated at Felsted School. In 2005, he was injured in a house fire where he suffered 20 per cent burns to his abdomen.

== Racing record ==
=== Career summary ===
Season	Series	Team	Races	Wins	Poles	F/Laps	Podiums	Points	Position
2002	Zip Formula Great Britain		6	0	0	0	2	76	7th
2003	Zip Formula Great Britain		12	5	0	0	9	203	1st
2003	Formula Renault UK Winter Series	Motaworld	4	0	0	0	1	28	10th
2004	Formula BMW UK		20	3	1	3	12	230	1st
2005	British Formula 3	Hitech GP	18	0	0	0	0	16	15th
2005	Porsche Carrera Cup GB	Porsche Motorsport	2	0	0	0	0	NC	NC
2006	Formula Atlantic	Jensen Motorsport	12	0	0	0	0	72	16th
2007	Formula Palmer Audi	MSV	20	6	4	2	14	360	1st
2007	Formula Palmer Audi Autumn Trophy	MSV	6	1	0	0	2	87	4th
2008	Porsche Carrera Cup GB	Team Parker Racing	20	7	8	4	13	273	4th
2009	Porsche Carrera Cup GB	Team Parker Racing	20	8	15	7	15	87	1st
2010	Porsche Supercup	Schnabl Engineering Team Parker Racing	10	0	0	0	0	45	15th
2011	British GT Championship	Trackspeed	5	1	0	0	2	62.5	7th
2017	Blancpain GT Series Asia	HubAuto Racing	2	0	0	0	0	NC	NC
2020	British GT Championship	Team Parker Racing	1	0	0	0	0	NC	NC

==== Complete British Formula Three results ====
(key) (Races in bold indicate pole position) (Races in italics indicate fastest lap)

Year	Team	1	2	3	4	5	6	7	8	9	10	11	12	13	14	15	16	17	18	19	20	21	22	23	24	Pos	Points
2005	Hitech GP	DON; 1 Ret	DON; 2; 9	SPA; 1 C	SPA; 2 C	CRO; 1 Ret	CRO; 2 Ret	KNO; 1 Ret	KNO; 2 Ret	THR; 1 Ret	THR; 2; 15	CAS; 1; 15	CAS; 2 Ret	MZA; 1 Ret	MZA; 2 DSQ	MZA; 3 DSQ	SIL; 1 Ret	SIL; 2; 8	SIL; 3 DNS	NÜR; 1; 5	NÜR; 2; 9	MON; 1 DNS	MON; 2 DNS	SIL; 1 Ret	SIL; 2; 10	15th	16

==== Complete Champ Car Atlantic Series Results ====
(key) (Races in bold indicate pole position) (Races in italics indicate fastest lap)

Year	Team	1	2	3	4	5	6	7	8	9	10	11	12	Pos	Points
2006	Jensen Motorsport	LBH; 24	HOU; 19	MTY; 24	POR; 10	CLE1; 12	CLE2; 20	TOR; 19	EDM; 8	SJO; 4	DEN; 21	MTL; 17	ROA; 18	**16th**	**72**

==== Complete Porsche Supercup results ====
(key) (Races in bold indicate pole position) (Races in italics indicate fastest lap)

Year	Team	1	2	3	4	5	6	7	8	9	10	Pos	Points
2010	Schnabl Engineering/Team Parker Racing	BHR; 11	BHR; 8	CAT; 7	MON; 11	VAL; Ret	SIL; 21†	HOC; 13	HUN; 10	SPA; 11	MZA; Ret	15th	45

==== Complete British GT Championship results ====
(key) (Races in bold indicate pole position) (Races in italics indicate fastest lap)

Year	Team	Car	Class	1	2	3	4	5	6	7	8	9	Pos	Points
2020	Team Parker Racing	Porsche 911 GT3 Cup	GT3	OUL; 1	OUL; 2	DON; 1	DON; 2	BRH; 1	DON; 1	SNE; 1	SNE; 2	SIL; Ret	NC	NC

Sporting positions
Preceded by None	Formula BMW UK; Champion; 2004	Succeeded by Dean Smith
Preceded by Jon Barnes	Formula Palmer Audi; Champion; 2007	Succeeded by Jason Moore
Preceded by Tim Harvey	Porsche Carrera Cup GB; Champion; 2009	Succeeded by Tim Harvey
