= Andrew Scott =

Andrew Scott may refer to:

== Musicians ==
- Andy Scott (guitarist) (born 1949), British guitarist with glam rock band Sweet
- Andy Scott (saxophonist) (born 1966), British saxophonist and composer
- Andy Scott (1966–2020), drummer with British bands including Wasted Youth
- Andrew Scott (drummer) (born 1967), drummer for the Canadian rock group Sloan
- Andrew Scott (Canadian musician, born 1979), alternative folk singer and songwriter
- Andrew Scott (Canadian jazz guitarist), Toronto-based jazz guitarist

== Sportspeople ==
- Andrew Scott (golfer) (born c. 1870), Scottish professional golfer
- Andrew Scott (Australian footballer) (born 1952), Hawthorn VFL footballer
- Andrew Scott (cricketer) (1960–2006), Australian cricketer
- Andrew Scott (baseball) (born 1969), Australian baseball player
- Andy Scott (footballer, born 1972), English footballer whose clubs included Sheffield United, Brentford and Leyton Orient
- Andy Scott (footballer, born 1975), English football full back
- Andy Scott (Scottish footballer) (born 1985), Scottish footballer who currently plays for Alloa Athletic
- Andrew Scott (Northern Irish footballer) (born 2000), footballer for Larne

== Others ==
- Andrew Scott (bishop) (1772–1846), Roman Catholic bishop of Glasgow
- Andrew Scott (judge) (1789–1851), American lawyer, judge in the Arkansas Territory
- Andrew Scott (VC) (1840–1882), British soldier, won the Victoria Cross, 1877
- Captain Moonlite (Andrew George Scott, 1842–1880), Australian bushranger
- Andrea Scotti (1931–2003), credit as Andrew Scott, Italian actor
- Andrew Cunningham Scott (born 1952), British geologist
- Andrew John Scott (botanist) (born 1950), British botanist
- Andrew Murray Scott (born 1955), Scottish novelist, poet and non-fiction book writer
- Andy Scott (politician) (1955–2013), Liberal member of the Canadian Parliament
- Andrew Scott (museum director) (born 1958), British museum director
- Andy Scott (sculptor) (born 1964), Scottish figurative sculptor
- Andrew Scott (economist) (born 1965), British economist
- Andrew Scott (actor) (born 1976), Irish film, television and stage actor
- Andrew Montagu Douglas Scott (1906–1971), British Army officer
- Drew Scott (born 1978), star of Property Brothers
- Andy Scott (entrepreneur) (born 1979), British multi-millionaire entrepreneur and businessman
- Andrew Scott (GR13), a character in the 1992 film Universal Soldier
- Andrew Scott, British writer and journalist, who uses the pen name of Otto English

== See also ==
- Andrew Gilbert-Scott (born 1958), former British racing driver
