= Andrew John Scott =

Andrew John Scott may refer to:

- Andrew Scott (museum director), British museum director
- Andrew Scott (economist), British economist
- Andrew John Scott (botanist), British botanist
- Andrew Scott (Australian footballer), Australian rules footballer

== See also ==
- Andrew Scott (disambiguation)
- John Scott (disambiguation)
