= Redwing Coaches =

British coach tour operator

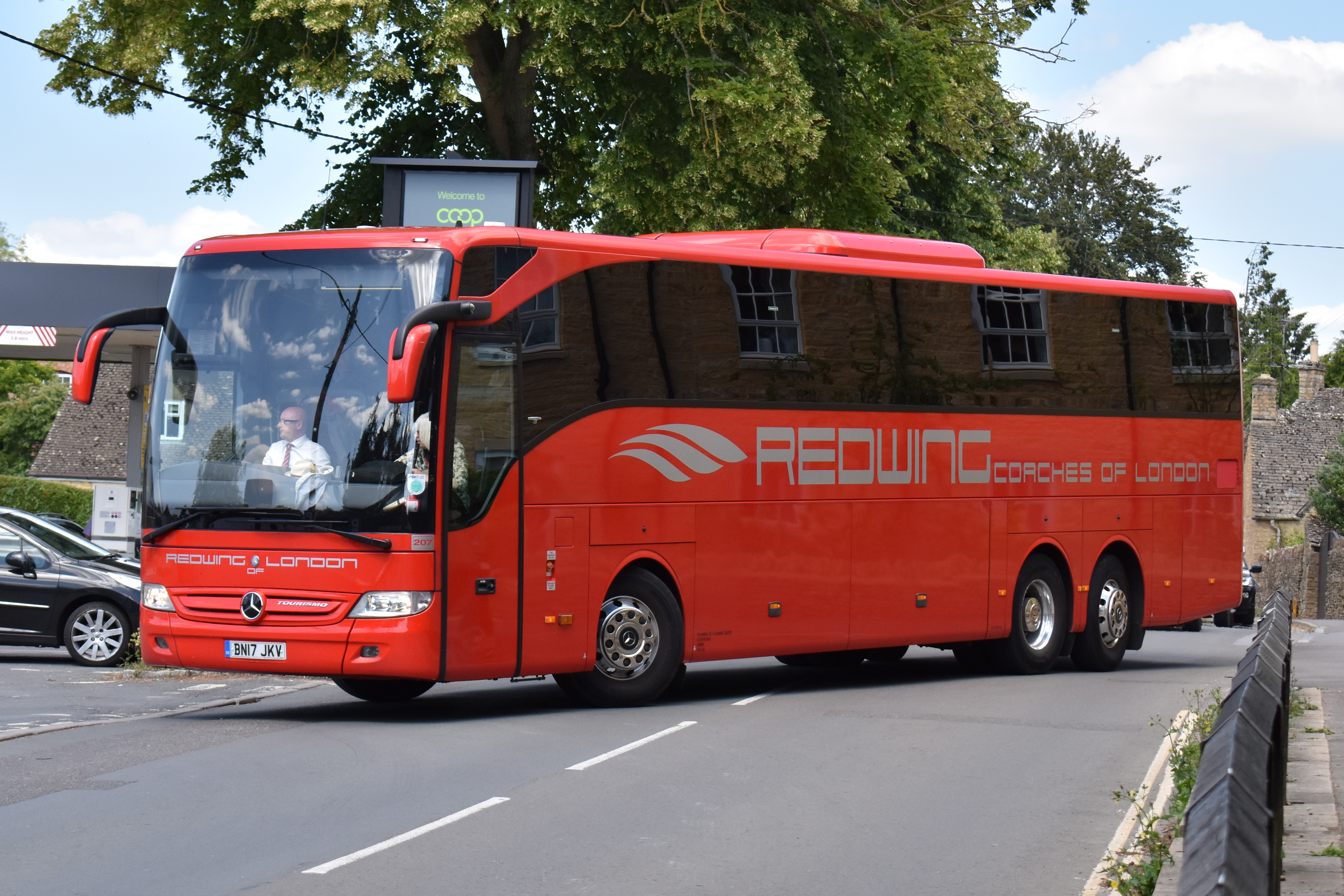
- Mercedes-Benz Tourismo in Bourton-on-the-Water in June 2018
- Parent: Paul Hockley; Nigel Taylor
- Founded: 1987; 39 years ago by Paul Campana
- Headquarters: Herne Hill, United Kingdom
- Service area: Kent, London
- Service type: Coach operator
- Fleet: 55 (November 2015)
- Fuel type: Diesel
- Website: www.redwing-coaches.co.uk

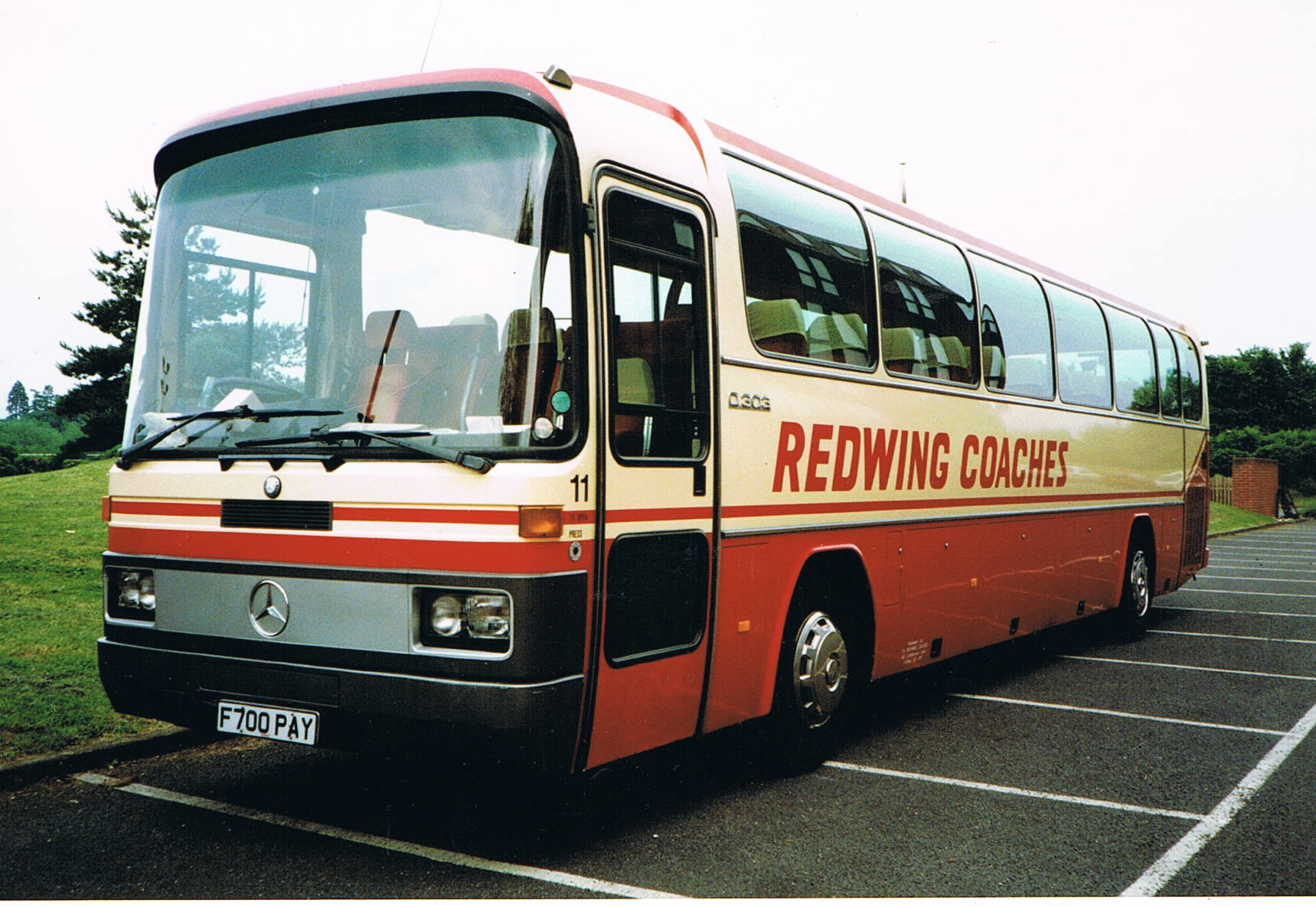
Mercedes-Benz O303 in 1989

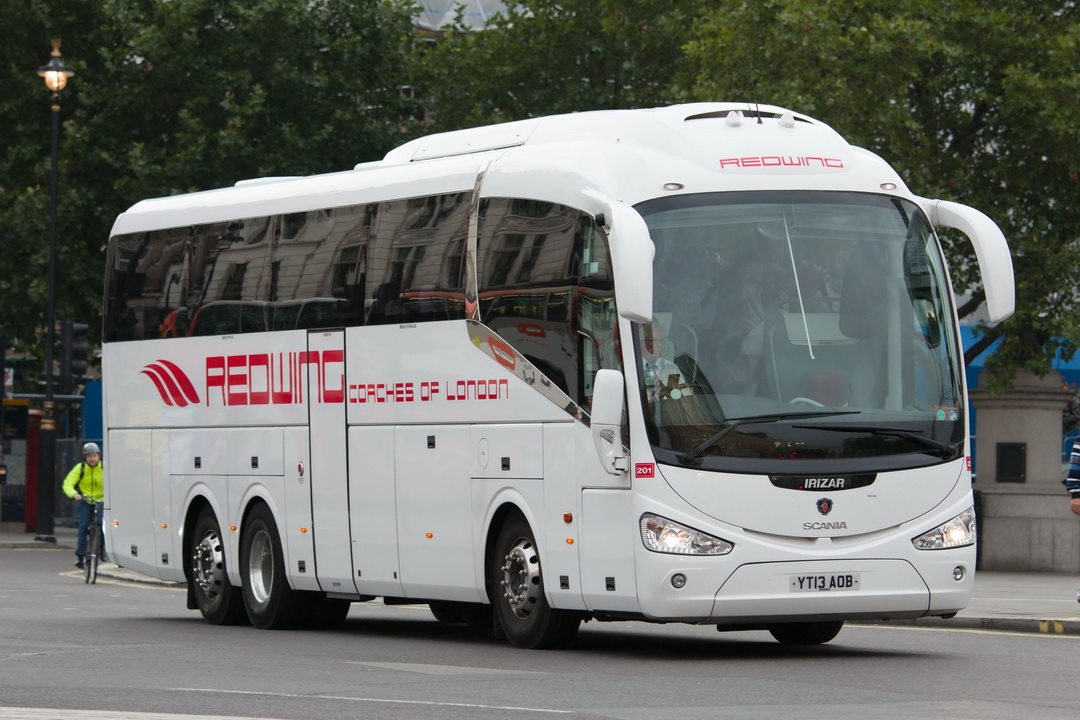
Irizar i6 bodied Scania K400EB6 in 2014

Redwing Coaches is an English coach tour operator operating in Kent and London.

== History ==
Redwing Coaches was founded in 1987 by Paul Campana. Initially based in Coldharbour Lane, in 2000 it relocated to Herne Hill. In July 2006, the business was sold to Addison Lee.

In April 2013, the business was purchased by Paul Hockley and Nigel Taylor in a management buyout. In June 2015, the Reliance Travel of Gravesend business was purchased.

In February 2022, the business was purchased by entrepreneur Andy Scott, then sold to Skills Motor Coaches in November 2025.

== Services ==
Redwing operates a commuter service from Gravesend to Canary Wharf and Central London. It operates day trips out of London under contract to Evan Evans Tours.

== Fleet ==
As at November 2015 the fleet comprised 55 coaches.
