= Lynda Gratton =

British academic, and management consultant (born 1955)

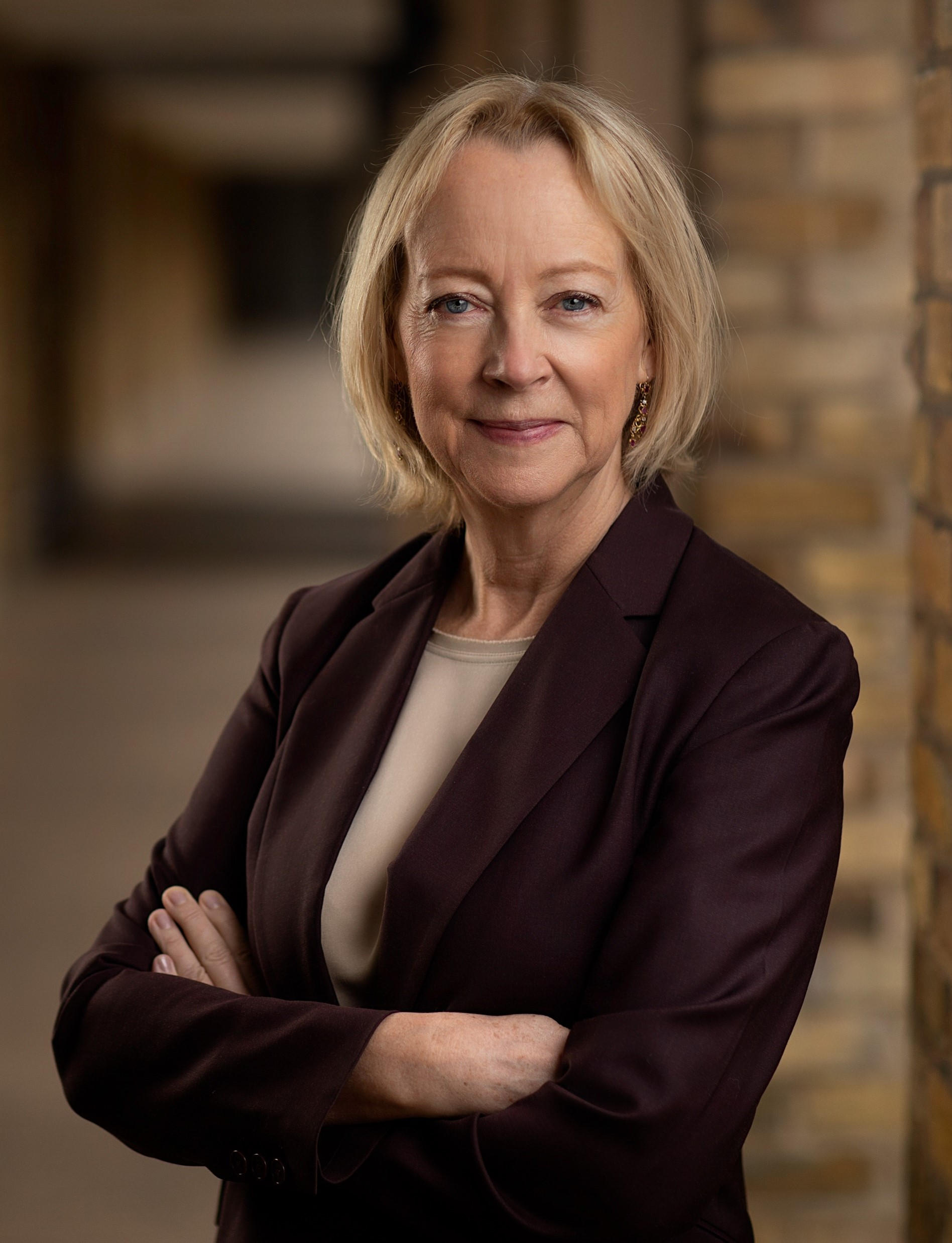
- Gratton (2021)
- Born: 1955 (age 70–71); Liverpool, England, UK
- Occupations: Author, academic, management consultant
- Website: www.lyndagratton.com

Lynda Gratton (born February 1955) a British organizational theorist, consultant, and Professor of Management Practice at London Business School where she is also Academic Co-Director of the SARI Foundation For Work, Careers, and Longevity. She is also the founder of HSM Advisory, known for her work on organisational behaviour.

== Biography ==
Born in Liverpool, England, the oldest of four children, Gratton took a degree in psychology followed by a PhD at Liverpool University.

After graduation, Gratton started her career at British Airways, where she was Chief Psychologist. In 1982 she moved to the management consultancy firm PA Consulting Group, where she became Director.

In 1989 she started her academic career as assistant professor at London Business School. In 2004 she was appointed Senior Fellow of the UK's Advanced Institute of Management Practice. In 2006 she became the founding director of the Lehman Centre for Women in Business at the London Business School.

In 2005 she founded HSM Advisory, a specialist research and consulting team that bridges academia and business. In October 2009 HSM Advisory launched the Future of Work Research Consortium, spearheading an experiment in co-creation among management, academics and executives. To date, the Future of Work Research Consortium has brought together executives from more than 110 global companies in Europe, South Africa, Japan, and Australia.

Gratton is a Fellow of the World Economic Forum and has chaired the WEF Council on Leadership. She chairs the Drucker prize panel and is on the governing body of London Business School. She continues to work with many of the world's biggest companies, including Vodafone, Shell and Unilever. She was for many years the judging panel of the Financial Times and Goldman Sachs Business Book of the Year Award. Her book The 100-Year Life: Living and Working in an Age of Longevity was shortlisted for the 2016 Financial Times and McKinsey Business Book of the Year Award.

== Awards and recognition ==
In 2008 The Financial Times selected her as the business thinker most likely to make a real difference over the next decade. In 2011 she was ranked by The Times as one of the top 15 Business Thinkers in the world today. And in 2011 she was ranked number one in Human Resources Magazine's "Top 25 HR Most Influential UK Thinkers 2011" poll.

In 2012 The Shift received the business book of the year award in Japan and has been translated into more than 15 languages.

In 2013 she was awarded the Life Time Achievement Award by HR Magazine and equally in 2013 she was amongst the 15 top thought leaders in the Thinkers50 ranking.

In 2015 The Key won the CMI Management Book of the Year. This book looks at the impact of the changing world on corporate practices and processes and on leadership.

In 2016, Gratton and co-author Andrew Scott, published The 100-Year Life: Living and Working in an Age of Longevity, which, translated into many languages, continues to generate significant interest across the world, also in Japan, where it quickly became a bestseller. It was shortlisted for the FT Business Book of the Year award.

Gratton's work has been acknowledged globally – she has won the Tata prize in India; in the US she has been named as the annual Fellow of NAHR and won the CCL prize; whilst in Australia she has won the HR prize. In 2017, Gratton became an Advisor for @GoogleOrg's initiative to help people prepare for the changing nature of work and was also invited by Prime Minister Shinzo Abe of Japan to join a new advisory council "Council for designing the 100-year-life society".

== Selected publications ==
Lynda Gratton has written several books and academic articles on organisational behaviour. Books, a selection:

- Gratton, Lynda (1999) Strategic Human Resource Management: Corporate Rhetoric and Human Reality, Oxford University Press, May 1999.
- Gratton, Lynda (2000) Living Strategy: Putting People at the Heart of Corporate Purpose, Financial Times/Prentice Hall, April 2000.
- Gratton, Lynda (2004) The Democratic Enterprise: Liberating your Business with Freedom, Flexibility and Commitment, Financial Times/Prentice Hall, 2004.
- Gratton, Lynda (2007) Hot Spots: Why Some Teams, Workplaces, and Organisations Buzz with Energy and Others Don't, Financial Times/Prentice Hall, 2007.
- Gratton, Lynda (2009) Glow: How you can radiate energy, innovation and success, Financial Times/Prentice Hall, 2009.
- Gratton, Lynda (2011) The Shift: The Future of Work is Already Here, HarperCollins Business, 2011.
- Gratton, Lynda (2014) The Key: How Corporations Succeed by Solving the World's Toughest Problems, McGraw-Hill Education, 2014.
- Gratton, Lynda & Scott, Andrew (2016) 100-year life: living and working in an age of longevity, Bloomsbury 2016.
- Gratton, Lynda & Scott, Andrew (2021) The New Long Life: A Framework for Flourishing in a Changing World, Bloomsbury 2021.
- Gratton, Lynda (2022) Redesigning Work: How to Transform Your Organisation and Make Hybrid Work for Everyone, Penguin Business 2022.
- Gratton, Lynda (2026) Living the 100-Year Life: How to build a career that lasts and a life you love, Bloomsbury 2026.

Articles, a selection:

- The Predictable Executive Career Arc is Over, Harvard Business Review, 2026
- As Careers Get Longer, Midcareer Work Needs to Change, Harvard Business Review, 2026
- Redesigning How We Work, Harvard Business Review, 2023
- Managers Can't Do It All, Harvard Business Review, 2022
- The Challenge of Scaling Soft Skills by Lynda Gratton in the MIT Sloan Management Review 2018
- How Leaders Face the Future of Work by Lynda Gratton in the MIT Sloan Management Review 2018
- The Long Journey to Understanding Intangible Assets by Lynda Gratton in the MIT Sloan Management Review 2018
- Corporate Implications of Longer Lives by Lynda Gratton & Andrew Scott in the MIT Sloan Management Review 2017 Spring Vol 58:3 p 63-70
- Rethinking the Manager's Role by Lynda Gratton in the MIT Sloan Management Review 2016 Fall Vol 58:1 p 24-27
- Gender role self-concept, categorical gender, and transactional-transformational leadership: Implications for perceived workgroup performance by Lynda Gratton and J H Wolfram in the Journal of Leadership and Organizational Studies 2014 Vol 21:4 p 338-353
- The Third Wave of Virtual Work By Lynda Gratton & Tammy Johns Published in the Harvard Business Review: January 2013
- End of the Middle Manager By Lynda Gratton Published in the Harvard Business Review: January 2011
- Lynda Gratton investigates the Future of Work By Lynda Gratton Published in the Business Strategy Review: Autumn 2010
- Eight Ways to Build Collaborative Teams By Lynda Gratton & Tammy Erickson Published in the Harvard Business Review: November 2007
- Bridging Faultlines in Diverse Teams By Lynda Gratton, Andreas Voigt and Tammy Erickson Published in MIT Sloan Management Review: Summer 2007
- Truss, Catherine, and Lynda Gratton. "Strategic human resource management: A conceptual approach." International Journal of Human Resource Management 5.3 (1994): 663–686.
- Truss, C., Gratton, L., Hope‐Hailey, V., McGovern, P., & Stiles, P. (1997). Soft and hard models of human resource management: a reappraisal. Journal of Management Studies, 34(1), 53–73.
- McGovern, P., Gratton, L., Hope‐Hailey, V., Stiles, P., & Truss, C. (1997). Human resource management on the line?. Human Resource Management Journal, 7(4), 12–29.
- Gratton, L., Hope‐Hailey, V., Stiles, P., & Truss, C. (1999). Linking individual performance to business strategy: The people process model. Human Resource Management, 38(1), 17–31.
- Ghoshal, Sumantra, and Lynda Gratton. "Integrating the enterprise." Sumantra Ghoshal On Management: A Force For Good (2005): 313.
