= The 100-Year Life =

2016 book by Lynda Gratton

- First edition
- Author: Lynda Gratton
- Genre: Self-help
- Publisher: Bloomsbury
- Publication date: 2016
- ISBN: 978-1472947321

The 100-Year Life is a 2016 self-help book by Lynda Gratton, professor of management practice at London Business School, and Andrew Scott, professor of economics at the same institution.
