= Climatecars =

Hire car service in London, England

- Company type: green car service
- Industry: Transport
- Founded: 2007
- Founder: Nicko Williamson
- Defunct: 2015
- Fate: Acquired by Addison Lee
- Headquarters: Battersea, England, London, UK
- Area served: Greater London
- Services: Minicab

Climatecars was a London based private hire car service which used solely hybrid and electric cars in its fleet. The company promoted itself as a green alternative to black taxi and minicab companies based in London. In 2015, Climatecars was acquired by car service company Addison Lee.

== History ==
Climatecars was founded in 2007 by Nicko Williamson, a University of Bristol graduate. Williamson studied the market and worked for an existing car service before starting his company.

Like other private car services, Climatecars were booked online or over the telephone, usually charged fixed prices, and could not use bus lanes. Drivers were required to pass a less stringent test than taxi drivers.

In 2011, the company raised £200,000 from Clydesdale bank and used the money to expand its fleet of vehicles. That year Williamson was voted Ernst & Young Entrepreneur of The Year, received a BusinessGreen Leader Award, and was also awarded the Young Entrepreneur of the Year award at the Fast Growth Business Awards Ceremony.

In 2013, Sam Cropper was appointed CEO of Climatecars. At that time the company was operating about 100 vehicles. In 2015, Climatecars was acquired by car service company Addison Lee, as a way of expanding its fleet while reducing average emission rates. At the time of its acquisition, Climatecars had 115 vehicles.

== Technology and environment ==
Climatecars used hybrid and fully electric cars to keep emissions to a minimum. Their fleet was made up primarily of the Toyota Prius hybrid plus some fully electric Renault Fluence vehicles. Climatecars emissions from the Prius were 89 g/km and the Fluence were 71g/km (when charged off the UK grid), which was less than the 233 g/km of the latest Black Taxi (LTI TX4) in 2015.
