= John Griffin (businessman) =

British businessman (born 1942)

Sir John Griffin
- Born: John Patrick Griffin; 1 August 1942 (age 83)
- Education: Finchley Catholic High School
- Occupation: Businessman
- Known for: Founder of Addison Lee
- Children: 2, including Liam Griffin

Sir John Patrick Griffin (born 1 August 1942) is a British businessman. He is the founder of the cab and courier company Addison Lee.

== Early life ==
John Patrick Griffin was born on 1 August 1942 in the UK to a civil engineering contractor father. He was raised in Kilburn from 9 years old attending Finchley Catholic High School. However, he left school with no qualifications after contracting tuberculosis from drinking the milk of a cow he had milked on a school visit to a farm.

== Career ==
While Griffin was training as an accountant, his father's road and sewer building business got into financial difficulty. Griffin left accountancy training to help salvage the business, with some success. During this period, and wanting a flexible job to create extra income, Griffin started working as a minicab driver which turned into a full-time job.

Griffin eventually decided to move on from driving minicabs, deciding he could do a better job of running a minicab business. Together with another driver, he set about starting a company which today is known as West One Cars. However, Griffin was convinced to stay on with his original employer after his salary was quadrupled and only later decided to form his own company.

Griffin was convinced that his new company needed a name which started with an "A" for it to appear early in telephone directory listings. A colleague who lived in a squat in Addison Gardens said people seemed to think this was a very posh address, which Griffin supplemented with Lee. Addison Lee was founded in 1975, with half the company owned by investor Lenny Foster.

In 1976, Griffin founded the Private Hire Car Association in response to the Local Government (Miscellaneous Provisions) Act 1976. As chairman of the association, Griffin was vocal in the debate that led to the licensing of private hire operators in the UK.

He appeared on the television programme, The Secret Millionaire in December 2009.

He stepped down as chairman of Addison Lee in 2014, shortly after private equity firm Carlyle Group purchased a majority stake in the company in a deal worth £300 million.

== Political affiliations ==
He is one of the top 20 donors to the Conservative Party.

== Philanthropy ==
He is an "Enterprise Fellow" of The Prince's Trust. He has also made charitable contributions to the Variety Club Golf Society.

== Personal life ==
He resides in Potters Bar, Hertfordshire, north of London, with his partner, Rita. He has two sons, Liam and Kieran, who both work for Addison Lee. In June 2023 he featured on Channel 4's Britain's Most Expensive Houses trying to sell his house overlooking Regent's Park for £29 million.

In the 2024 New Year Honours Griffin was appointed Knight Bachelor for services to business and to charity.
