= Liam Griffin (racing driver) =

British racing driver and businessman (born 1973)

- Nationality: British
- Born: 9 March 1973 (age 53) Barnet, England

British Touring Car Championship career
- Debut season: 2011
- Current team: Addison Lee Motorbase
- Categorisation: FIA Bronze
- Car number: 66
- Starts: 76
- Wins: 0 (6 in class)
- Poles: 0
- Fastest laps: 0
- Best finish: 21st in 2011, 2012

Previous series
- 2009–10 2008–09: Porsche Carrera Cup GB; VW Cup

Liam Griffin (born 9 March 1973 in Barnet, Greater London) is a British racing driver and businessman. He is the son of John Griffin and was CEO of minicab company Addison Lee for ten years before carrying out a management buyout with the private equity firm Carlyle. He is currently the Vice Chairman of Addison Lee.

Griffin has competed in the 24 Hours of Le Mans twice and currently races in the European Le Mans Series. He has also represented Ireland at Triathlon in the European and World Age Group Championships.

== Racing career ==
=== Early years ===
Griffin started racing in 2008, competing in the VW Cup. He spent two years in the series, collecting three podiums and two race wins. In 2009, he entered two rounds of the Porsche Carrera Cup Great Britain at Silverstone, driving for Motorbase Performance. He returned for a full season in 2010 for the team, driving in the Pro-Am 1 class, he finished twenty-first overall in the driver standings.

=== British Touring Car Championship ===
==== Motorbase Performance (2011–13) ====
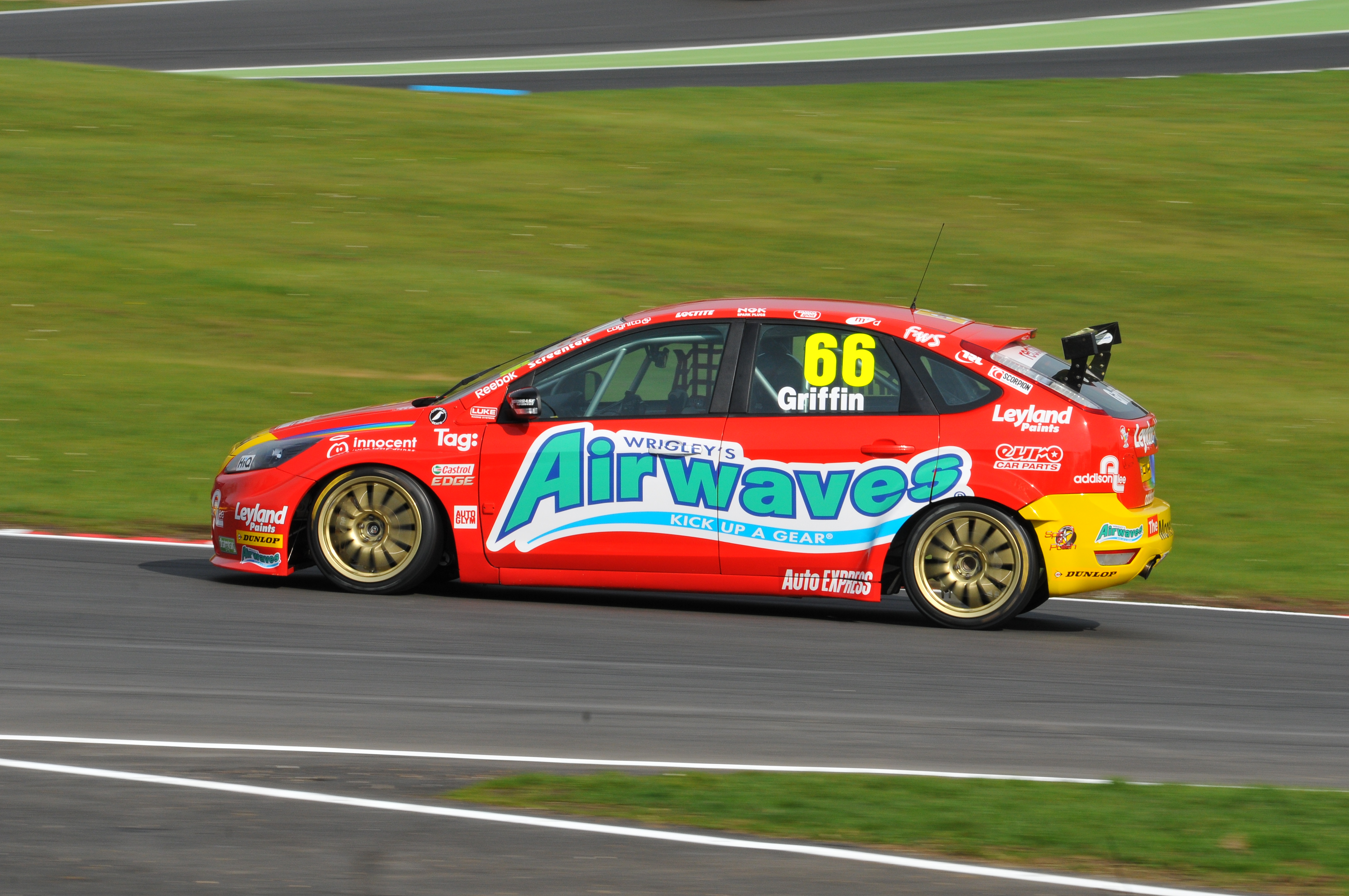
Griffin driving the Airwaves Racing Ford Focus ST at Brands Hatch during the 2011 British Touring Car Championship season.

Griffin raced in the BTCC for three years and had a number of top-ten finishes and one front row grid start as a result of the reverse grid. In his final year, he competed in the Jack Sears Trophy where he had 8 Class wins and finished 2nd in the Championship.

For 2011, Griffin entered the British Touring Car Championship. Staying with Motorbase, he drove a Ford Focus ST.

Griffin stayed with Motorbase in 2012, now racing under the Redstone Racing banner. He brought out the safety car at Croft after crashing his Redstone Racing Focus into the tyre wall, causing an engine fire. Griffin pulled out of the following meeting at Snetterton in order to focus on his business commitments during the 2012 Summer Olympics. He returned to the team at Silverstone and participated in the final two rounds of the season. After the final round at Brands Hatch, Griffin intended to retire from the BTCC.

In February 2013, Motorbase Performance announced that Griffin would race for them in the Jack Sears Trophy, driving the Super 2000 specification Ford Focus in 2013. Griffin took two class victories at the season opening Brands Hatch round to lead the trophy going to the second around at Donington Park.

== Racing record ==
=== Complete British Touring Car Championship results ===
(key) (Races in bold indicate pole position – 1 point awarded in first race) (Races in italics indicate fastest lap – 1 point awarded all races) (* signifies that driver lead race for at least one lap – 1 point awarded all races)

Year	Team	Car	1	2	3	4	5	6	7	8	9	10	11	12	13	14	15	16	17	18	19	20	21	22	23	24	25	26	27	28	29	30	Pos	Pts
2011	Airwaves Racing	Ford Focus ST Mk.II	BRH; 1 Ret	BRH; 2; 18	BRH; 3; 18	DON; 1; 13	DON; 2 Ret	DON; 3; 9	THR; 1; 14	THR; 2; 17	THR; 3; 15	OUL; 1; 15	OUL; 2; 18	OUL; 3 Ret	CRO; 1; 18	CRO; 2 Ret	CRO; 3; 16	SNE; 1; 17	SNE; 2; 14	SNE; 3 Ret	KNO; 1 Ret	KNO; 2 Ret	KNO; 3; 16	ROC; 1; 16	ROC; 2; 16	ROC; 3; 19	BRH; 1; 16	BRH; 2; 19	BRH; 3; 15	SIL; 1; 15	SIL; 2; 14	SIL; 3; 13	21st	2
2012	Redstone Racing	Ford Focus ST Mk.II	BRH; 1; 14	BRH; 2; 12	BRH; 3; 11	DON; 1 Ret	DON; 2 Ret	DON; 3; 14	THR; 1 Ret	THR; 2; 17	THR; 3; 12	OUL; 1 Ret	OUL; 2; 8	OUL; 3 Ret	CRO; 1; 14	CRO; 2; 14	CRO; 3 Ret	SNE; 1	SNE; 2	SNE; 3	KNO; 1	KNO; 2	KNO; 3	ROC; 1	ROC; 2	ROC; 3	SIL; 1 Ret	SIL; 2; 13	SIL; 3 Ret	BRH; 1; 19	BRH; 2; 13	BRH; 3; 14	21st	37
2013	Addison Lee Motorbase	Ford Focus ST Mk.II	BRH; 1; 17	BRH; 2; 11	BRH; 3; 15	DON; 1; 20	DON; 2 Ret	DON; 3 Ret	THR; 1; 20	THR; 2 Ret	THR; 3 Ret	OUL; 1; 20	OUL; 2; 19	OUL; 3; 16	CRO; 1	CRO; 2	CRO; 3	SNE; 1 Ret	SNE; 2 Ret	SNE; 3 Ret	KNO; 1; 17	KNO; 2; 18	KNO; 3 Ret	ROC; 1 Ret	ROC; 2 Ret	ROC; 3 DNS	SIL; 1 Ret	SIL; 2 Ret	SIL; 3 DNS	BRH; 1; 19	BRH; 2 Ret	BRH; 3 Ret	25th	6

=== Complete British GT Championship results ===
(key) (Races in bold indicate pole position) (Races in italics indicate fastest lap)

Year	Team	Car	Class	1	2	3	4	5	6	7	8	9	10	DC	Points
2014	Oman Racing Team	Aston Martin V12 Vantage GT3	GT3	OUL; 1	OUL; 2	ROC; 1; 12	SIL; 1; 9	SNE; 1	SNE; 2	SPA; 1	SPA; 2	BRH; 1	DON; 1; 5	28th	18
2015	Oman Racing Team	Aston Martin V12 Vantage GT3	GT3	**OUL**; **1**; 1	OUL; 2; 4	ROC; 1; 3	SIL; 1; 6	SPA; 1; 5	BRH; 1; 6	SNE; 1; 1	SNE; 2; 21	DON; 1 Ret		4th	123.5
2016	Barwell Motorsport	Lamborghini Huracán GT3	GT3	BRH; 1; 3	ROC; 1; 4	OUL; 1; 1	OUL; 2; 5	SIL; 1 Ret	SPA; 1; 8	SNE; 1; 9	SNE; 2 Ret	DON; 1; 5		5th	98.5
2017	Barwell Motorsport with GardX	Lamborghini Huracán GT3	GT3	OUL; 1; 2	OUL; 2 Ret	ROC; 1; 5	SNE; 1; 2	SNE; 2; 2	SIL; 1; 6	SPA; 1; 8	SPA; 2 Ret	BRH; 1; 2	DON; 1; 4	5th	134

=== Complete FIA World Endurance Championship results ===
Year	Entrant	Class	Car	Engine	1	2	3	4	5	6	7	8	9	Rank	Points
2015	Aston Martin Racing	LMGTE Am	Aston Martin Vantage GTE	Aston Martin 4.5 L V8	SIL	SPA	LMS	NÜR	COA	FUJ; 7	SHA; 6	BHR		19th	14
2016	Aston Martin Racing	LMGTE Am	Aston Martin Vantage GTE	Aston Martin 4.5 L V8	SIL	SPA	LMS; 4	NÜR	MEX	COA	FUJ	SHA	BHR	11th	24

=== 24 Hours of Le Mans results ===
Year	Team	Co-Drivers	Car	Class	Laps	Pos.	Class Pos.
2016	(United Kingdom) Aston Martin Racing	(Switzerland) Gary Hirsch (United Kingdom) Andrew Howard	Aston Martin V8 Vantage GTE	GTE; Am	318	36th	7th
2018	(United Kingdom) JMW Motorsport	(United States) Cooper MacNeil (United States) Jeff Segal	Ferrari 488 GTE	GTE; Am	332	30th	5th

=== Complete European Le Mans Series results ===
Year	Entrant	Class	Chassis	Engine	1	2	3	4	5	6	Rank	Points
2018	JMW Motorsport	LMGTE	Ferrari 488 GTE	Ferrari F154CB 3.9 L Turbo V8	LEC; 1	MNZ; 4	**RBR**; Ret	SIL; 1	SPA; 4‡	**ALG**; 2	2nd	88

^{‡} Half points awarded as less than 75% of race distance was completed.
