= 2016 24 Hours of Le Mans =

84th 24 Hours of Le Mans endurance race

Previous: 2015	Next: 2017
Index: Races | Winners

Circuit de la Sarthe track

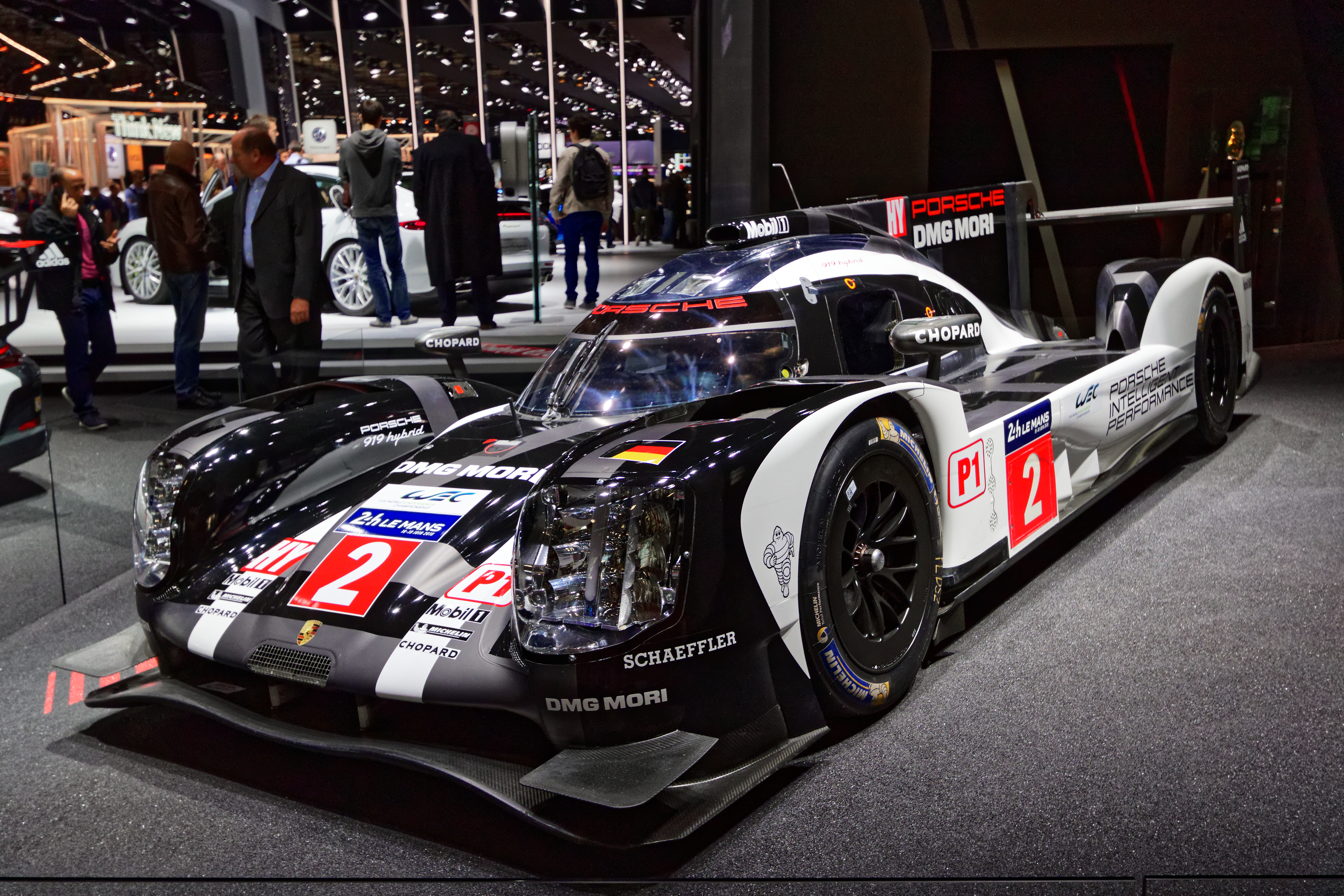
Porsche Team No. 2 Porsche 919 Hybrid, Winner of the 2016 24 Hours of Le Mans

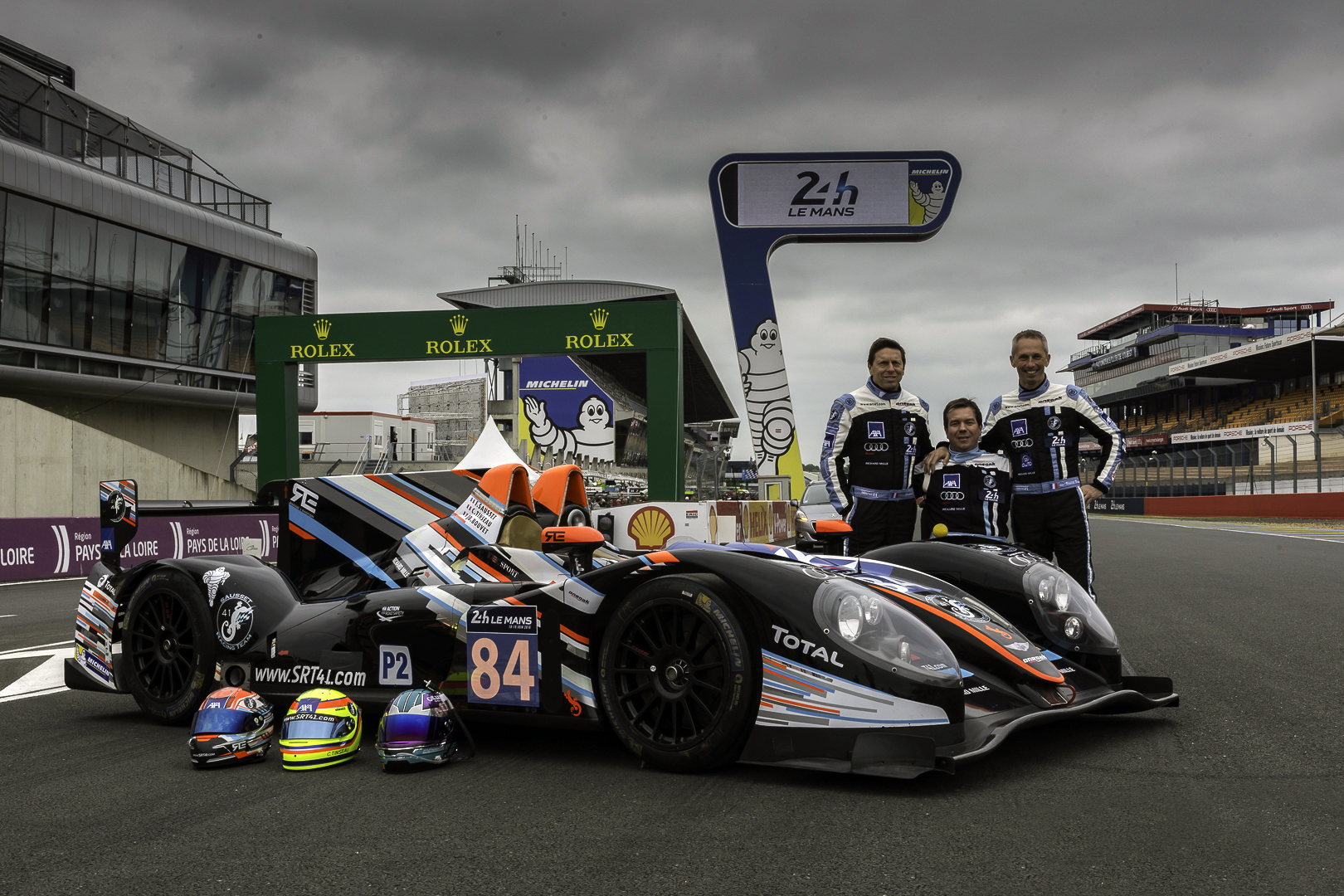
SRT41 by OAK Racing No. 84 Morgan LMP2, First Garage 56 entry to Finish the 24 Hours of Le Mans

The 84th 24 Hours of Le Mans (French: 84^{e} 24 Heures du Mans) was a 24-hour automobile endurance racing event held for teams of three drivers each fielding Le Mans Prototype and Le Mans Grand Touring Endurance cars from 15 to 19 June 2016 at the Circuit de la Sarthe, close to Le Mans, France before 263,500 spectators. It was the 84th running of the 24 Hour race organised by the Automobile Club de l'Ouest (ACO) as well as the third and flagship round of the 2016 FIA World Endurance Championship. A test day was held two weeks prior to the race on 5 June.

Neel Jani of Porsche started from pole position for the second consecutive year, but heavy rainfall forced the organisers to start the race behind a safety car for the first time in history. Once the rain had stopped and the track sufficiently dried, the field was released from under safety car conditions. Toyota, Audi and Porsche traded off the race lead in the early hours until the No. 6 Toyota established a firm hold on first place, followed by the No. 5 Toyota and No. 2 Porsche. Issues for the No. 6 eventually allowed the No. 5 Toyota to take over the lead, maintaining a small gap from the Porsche. Kazuki Nakajima was driving the Toyota to the finish in the closing three minutes of the race when it suffered a mechanical issue and stopped on the circuit right after the finish line on his last lap. Jani overcame the one-minute gap with the ailing Toyota and passed it on the final lap, taking the race victory. It was Jani and co-driver Marc Lieb's first Le Mans win and Romain Dumas' second. The sister Toyota of Stéphane Sarrazin, Mike Conway and Kamui Kobayashi finished three laps behind in second, while the No. 8 Audi of Loïc Duval, Lucas di Grassi and Oliver Jarvis completed the race podium.

The Signatech Alpine-Nissan of Gustavo Menezes, Nicolas Lapierre and Stéphane Richelmi won the Le Mans Prototype 2 (LMP2) category after it led the final 196 laps of the race. Roman Rusinov, René Rast and Will Stevens of G-Drive Racing finished on the same lap as the Alpine, while the all-Russian SMP Racing BR01-Nissan of Vitaly Petrov, Kirill Ladygin and Viktor Shaytar was four laps behind in third. On the day of the fiftieth anniversary of their first overall 24 Hours of Le Mans victory when they swept the podium, Ford won the Le Mans Grand Touring Endurance Professional (LMGTE) Pro class with the No. 68 American entry of Joey Hand, Sébastien Bourdais and Dirk Müller. As they did in 1966, Ford's winning vehicle was a Ford GT (a Ford GT40 Mk.II in 1966), and they bested Ferrari to win as Risi Competizione were second with Giancarlo Fisichella, Toni Vilander and Matteo Malucelli, after their Ferrari 488 GTE and the winning Ford GT had led all but 26 laps of the race. Ford USA's sister car of Ryan Briscoe, Scott Dixon and Richard Westbrook was third. Americans also led the Le Mans Grand Touring Endurance Amateur (LMGTE Am) category, with Scuderia Corsa's Townsend Bell, Jeff Segal and Bill Sweedler edging out the fellow Ferrari of AF Corse, driven by Emmanuel Collard, Rui Águas and François Perrodo. Khaled Al Qubaisi, Patrick Long and David Heinemeier Hansson were third in class for Abu Dhabi-Proton.

The result increased Lieb, Jani and Dumas' Drivers' Championship advantage over the new second-placed Duval, di Grassi and Jarvis to 38 points while Kobayashi, Conway and Sarrazin's second-place finish advanced them to third position. André Lotterer, Benoît Tréluyer and Marcel Fässler moved from eighth place to fourth and Alexandre Imperatori, Dominik Kraihamer and Mathéo Tuscher fell to fifth after not finishing the race. In the Manufacturers' Championship, Porsche extended their lead over Audi to 38 points while Toyota fell to third place with six races left in the season.

== Background ==
The date for the 2016 Le Mans race was officially confirmed as part of the FIA World Endurance Championship's 2016 schedule at a FIA World Motor Sport Council meeting in Paris in December 2015. It was the third of nine scheduled endurance sports car rounds of the 2016 calendar and the 84th running of the event. With the end of the race scheduled for 19 June, the event conflicted with the 2016 European Grand Prix. Force India driver Nico Hülkenberg, who won the 2015 race with Porsche would be unable to return and defend his title, leading to accusations that Formula One Management had deliberately scheduled the race to conflict with Le Mans and prevent Formula One drivers from participating.

Before the race Porsche drivers Marc Lieb, Neel Jani and Romain Dumas led the Drivers' Championship with 43 points, 18 ahead of Loïc Duval, Lucas di Grassi and Oliver Jarvis and a further three in front of Kamui Kobayashi, Mike Conway and Stéphane Sarrazin. Alexandre Imperatori, Dominik Kraihamer and Mathéo Tuscher were fourth on 15 points and their teammates Nick Heidfeld, Nico Prost and Nelson Piquet Jr. were fifth with 12 points. In the Manufacturers' Championship, Porsche lead with 55 points, 12 ahead of Toyota in second position, and a further three in front of the third-placed manufacturer Audi.

== Circuit changes ==
Modifications were made to the circuit in the run-up to the race. A new entry run-off area was constructed at the Porsche Curves in response to a major accident sustained by Duval during practice for the 2014 24 Hours of Le Mans although the turn's alignment was not altered. SAFER barriers were installed on the outside of the first entry section of the turn, marking the technology's first appearance at a European motor racing venue. Vincent Beaumesnil, the Automobile Club de l'Ouest's (ACO) sporting manager, revealed was easier to install a chicane, but following discussions with the national motor racing governing body of France, the Fédération Française du Sport Automobile, the circuit's layout was allowed to remain unchanged.

== Entries ==
The ACO initially planned to expand the race entry from 56 cars to 58 in 2015. But responding to an increase in the number of "high-quality entry requests" they allowed 60 entries for the 2016 race. The Selection Committee took steps to ensure the two additional required pits would be operational in time for the 2016 race.

=== Automatic invitations ===
Teams that won their class in the previous running of the 24 Hours of Le Mans, or won championships in the European Le Mans Series (ELMS) or the Asian Le Mans Series (ALMS) earned automatic entry invitations. Some championship runners-up were also granted automatic invitations in certain series. Two participants in the IMSA SportsCar Championship (IMSA) were chosen by the series to be automatic entries by the ACO regardless of their performance. All FIA World Endurance Championship (FIA WEC) full-season entries automatically earned invitations. As invitations were granted to teams, they could change their cars from the previous year to the next but were not allowed to change their category. In the ELMS and ALMS, the Le Mans Grand Touring Endurance (LMGTE) class invitations could choose between the Pro and Am categories. The ELMS Le Mans Prototype 3 (LMP3) champion for 2015 was required to field an entry in Le Mans Prototype 2 (LMP2) while the 2015–16 ALMS LMP3 champion was allowed to select between LMP2 or LMGTE Am. ELMS GTC class champions of 2015 were limited to the LMGTE Am category.

Among the fourteen automatic invitations granted, three teams chose not to accept: Team LNT and Marc VDS did not continue their ELMS efforts in 2016 while SMP Racing opted to concentrate on their LMP2 entries and forgo defense of their Le Mans victory in LMGTE Am.

Automatic entries for the 2016 24 Hours of Le Mans
Reason invited	LMP1	LMP2	LMGTE Am	LMGTE Pro
1st in the 24 Hours of Le Mans	(Germany) Porsche Team	(Hong Kong) KCMG	(Russia) SMP Racing	(United States) Corvette Racing
1st in the European Le Mans Series (LMP2 and LMGTE)		(United Kingdom) Greaves Motorsport	(Denmark) Formula Racing	
2nd in the European Le Mans Series (LMGTE)			(Belgium) BMW Team Marc VDS	
1st in the European Le Mans Series (LMP3 and GTC)		(United Kingdom) Team LNT	(France) TDS Racing	
IMSA SportsCar Championship at-large entries		(United States) Michael Shank Racing	(United States) Scuderia Corsa	
1st in the Asian Le Mans Series (LMP2 and GT)		(Switzerland) Race Performance	(Singapore) Clearwater Racing	
1st in the Asian Le Mans Series (LMP3)		(China) DC Racing		

=== Entry list ===
In conjunction with the announcement of entries for the FIA WEC and the ELMS, the ACO announced the full 60 car entry list and ten car reserve list in Paris on 5 February. In addition to the 32 guaranteed entries from the FIA WEC, 13 entries came from the ELMS, nine from IMSA, four from the ALMS, while one-off entries competing only at Le Mans filled the rest of the field.

=== Reserves ===
The ACO named ten reserves to replace any entries which were withdrawn prior to the official test session. Greaves Motorsport, Riley Motorsports, and Proton Competition later withdrew their reserve entries. Algarve Pro Racing was promoted to the race entry when TDS Racing withdrew their LMGTE Am Aston Martin. Six reserves remained before the race, with a second entry from Pegasus Racing and Team AAI, as well as lone entries from JMW Motorsport, Courage, OAK Racing, and DragonSpeed.

=== Garage 56 ===
The Garage 56 entry to display new technologies returned following an absence in 2015. Frédéric Sausset, a quadruple amputee, participated in the race driving a modified Morgan LMP2 developed in conjunction with Onroak Automotive. The adapted automobile featured a throttle and braking system controlled by Sausset through his thighs while steering was achieved by attaching his right limb directly to the steering column. The car was also able to be driven in a normal fashion by his co-drivers. SRT 41 initially planned to use a new Audi engine for the programme but later changed to the ubiquitous Nissan LMP2 engine. The team participated in the Silverstone ELMS race as a precursor to Le Mans, the first Garage 56 entry to compete prior to Le Mans.

=== Debutants ===
Some drivers made their first appearance in the 2016 24 Hours of Le Mans. Four-time IndyCar Series champion Scott Dixon co-drove Ford Chip Ganassi Racing's (CGR) No. 69 car, although he missed the first day of scrutineering because of a rain delay in the Firestone 600 at the Texas Motor Speedway. It was announced in March that Olympic gold medallist and multiple cycling world champion Chris Hoy would share the No. 25 Algarve Pro Racing Ligier JS P2-Nissan with Andrea Pizzitola and Michael Munemann. Hoy was the first Summer Olympic gold medallist to compete at Le Mans, the ninth former Olympian to race there and the second Olympic champion to do so, after alpine skier Henri Oreiller. British GT Championship race winner Oliver Bryant was paired with Johnny O'Connell and Mark Patterson in the No. 57 Team AAI Chevrolet Corvette C7.R.

== Testing and practice ==
A mandatory test session for all sixty entries was held on 5 June, split into two daytime sessions. The morning session was led by Porsche, with Jani setting a lap time of 3:22.334. The second Porsche of Mark Webber followed, ahead of the two Audis of Marcel Fässler and Duval and both Toyotas of Anthony Davidson and Kobayashi. Oreca vehicles led the LMP2 category with six cars at the top of the timing charts, with the Signatech Alpine of Nicolas Lapierre ahead of Eurasia Motorsport and Manor. Porsche also led the LMGTE Pro category with a one-two, the No. 92 of Frédéric Makowiecki ahead of the No. 91 of Kévin Estre, followed by Oliver Gavin's No. 63 Chevrolet Corvette C7.R. The No. 55 AF Corse Ferrari of Matt Griffin was the fastest in LMGTE Am on his final lap, ahead of the second Ferrari of Scuderia Corsa. The session was temporarily stopped halfway through when François Perrodo beached his car in the Porsche Curves gravel trap and required extraction.

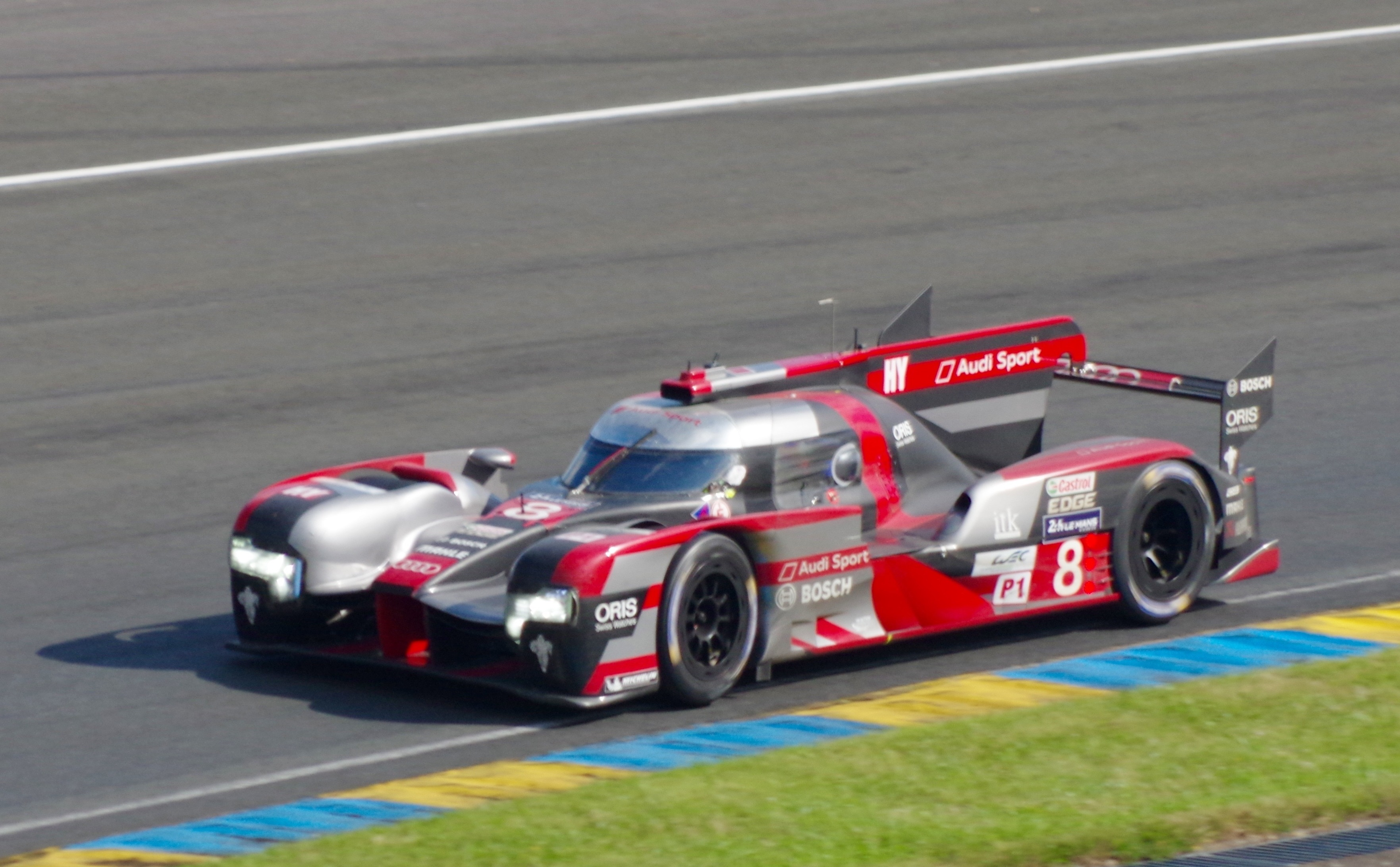
The No. 8 Audi R18 of Lucas di Grassi that set the fastest overall lap time in testing.

The second test session had Audi move to the top of the field when di Grassi set a 3:21.375 lap time, followed by an improved time for the No. 1 Porsche of Webber. The No. 8 Audi required repairs for much of the session after issues arose with the car's suspension system. Tristan Gommendy improved the fastest lap in LMP2, moving Eurasia Motorsport ahead of the Signatech Alpine. The Michael Shank Ligier-Honda of Oswaldo Negri Jr. had a heavy accident in the session's final hour at the left-hand barriers entering the second Mulsanne Chicane, bringing a premature end to the test. Negri was unhurt. Antonio García moved the No. 63 Chevrolet Corvette ahead of the pair of Porsches of Nick Tandy and Makowiecki, while another Corvette in LMGTE Am, driven by reserve driver Nicky Catsburg for Larbre Compétition, overtook the fastest time from the morning session. Other incidents had the No. 99 Aston Martin of Liam Griffin trigger the activation of the slow zone system when it stopped at the first chicane, and all cars slowed for Pu Junjin who went into the gravel trap at Mulsanne Corner. Yutaka Yamagishi impacted the tyre barrier at Tertere Rouge corner but was able to drive back to the pit lane. Tommy Milner spun his No. 64 Chevrolet Corvette at Dunlop Chicane. The safety car was deployed when Tracy Krohn beached his car in the Porsche curves entry gravel trap.

A single four-hour free practice session was available to the teams before the three qualifying sessions. Rain fell on parts of the circuit throughout the four hours. The No. 8 Audi led for much of the session until overtaken by the No. 2 Porsche Brendon Hartley until it too was pipped by Jani with a lap of 3:22.011 in the closing 10 minutes. The session was stopped briefly when Pierre Kaffer's ByKolles CLM-AER caught fire on the Mulsanne Straight after exiting the first chicane. Toyota ended the session with the No. 6 entry of Sarrazin heavily damaged at its front-end after hitting the barriers exiting the Indianapolis corner. Richard Bradley of KCMG led the LMP2 category ahead of the Signatech Alpine of Lapierre and Paul-Loup Chatin's Panis-Barthez Ligier-Nissan. Separate crashes by Bruno Senna of RGR Sport and Inès Taittinger of Pegasus Racing at the Porsche Curves and Indianapolis corner led to stoppages in the session. Ford and Ferrari entrants led the LMGTE Pro field with three Ford cars leading the class until overtaken by the Risi Ferrari of Toni Vilander and later the No. 51 AF Corse car of Gianmaria Bruni. Townsend Bell of Scuderia Corsa led the LMGTE Am category for much of the session until Rob Bell gave Le Mans rookies Clearwater Racing the fastest lap of the class in the final 15 minutes.

== Qualifying ==
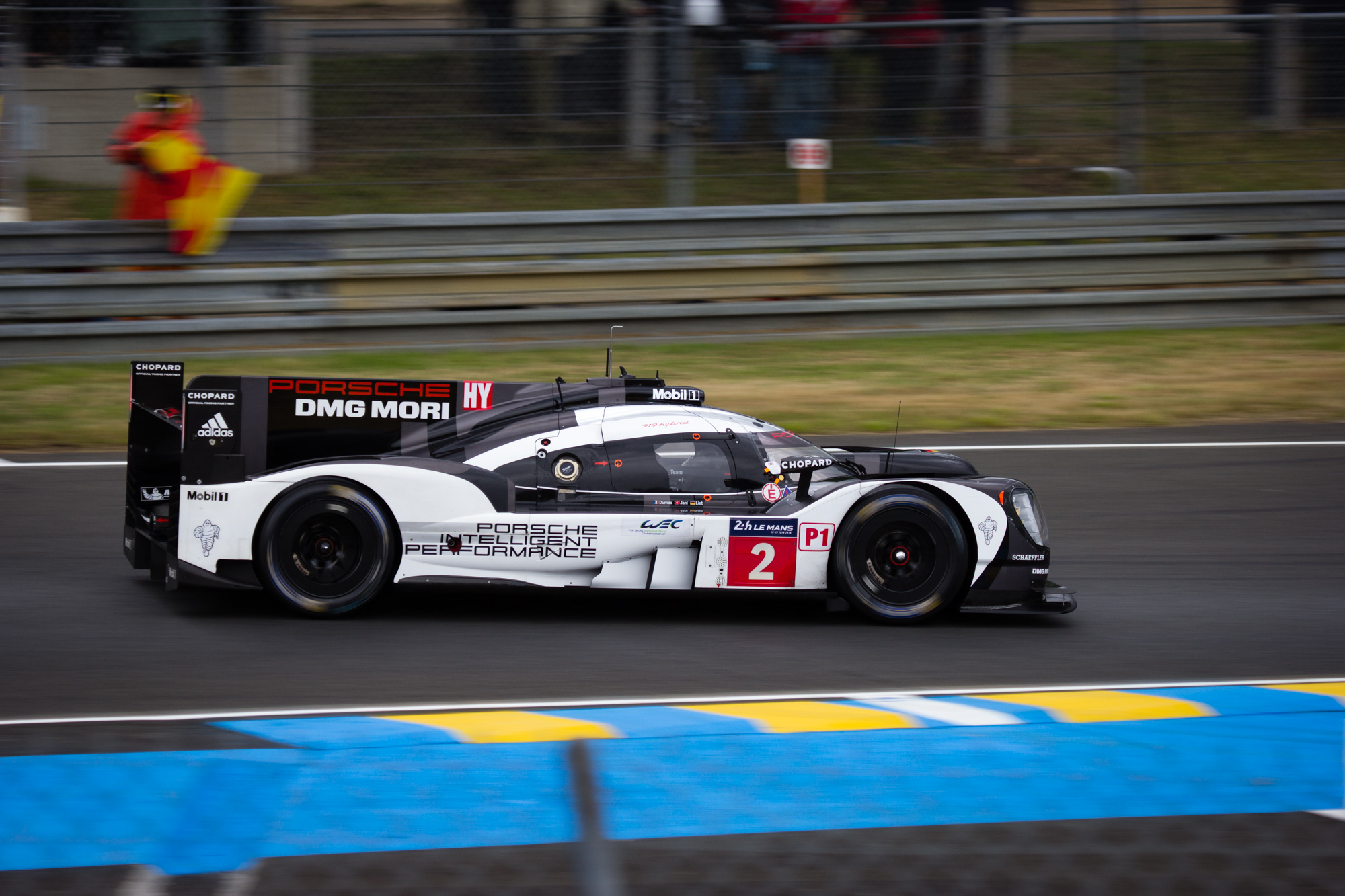
Neel Jani took the second successive pole position for the No. 2 Porsche 919 Hybrid at Le Mans in the opening ten minutes of the first qualifying session as rain affected the next day's two qualifying sessions.

Six hours of qualifying sessions to set the race's starting order with the fastest lap times set by each team's quickest driver were available to all the entrants, but pole position for the race was decided by Jani in the first ten minutes of the opening session. His 3:19.733 lap time that was affected by him being baulked in the Porsche Curves kept him at the top of the field as rain affected the two qualifying sessions the following day. The position was the second consecutive at Le Mans for both Jani and Porsche, while the sister car was nearly half a second behind in the second position. Sarrazin was a further half-second behind for third, followed by the other Toyota of Davidson. Audi struggled to get their cars on track at the start of the first session. Both R18s suffered mechanical ailments, eventually setting lap times three seconds slower than the pole position Porsche to hold onto fifth and sixth positions. Their best lap came from di Grassi. Kraihamer was the fastest privateer in the No. 13 Rebellion. The ByKolles entry did not appear during the session while repairs were made following a fire in the practice session. René Rast of G-Drive Racing led the LMP2 category with a 3:36.605 lap time set in the final 15 minutes of the session, after the lead in the category had been swapped between the G-Drive entry and the two Alpines over the course of the two-hour session. Nelson Panciatici in DC Racing's Alpine held on for second in the class while Signatech's Lapierre was third. Jin had an accident near Tertre Rouge, heavily damaging his car, and ending Eurasia Motorsport's night.

The LMGTE Pro category qualifying was swept by the new cars making their debuts at Le Mans. Ford's new GT in the hands of Dirk Müller set a lap time of 3:51.185, three-tenths of a second ahead of its American sister car the No. 69 Ford of Ryan Briscoe. Ferrari's new 488 driven by Bruni was third in the class for AF Corse, a further tenth of a second behind the two Ford cars. The British pair of Fords driven by Olivier Pla and Harry Tincknell were in fourth and fifth places, followed by two further Ferraris, with Makowiecki's No. 92 Porsche almost four seconds off the class pole position time as the first vehicle with previous experience at Le Mans. Risi Competizione's Ferrari brought out the only red flag of the session as Giancarlo Fisichella became stuck in the gravel trap at the Porsche Curves after a spin. In LMGTE Am Rob Bell's 3:56.827 lap in the Clearwater Racing Ferrari beat out Pedro Lamy in the No. 98 Aston Martin; two AF Corse Ferrari cars driven by Matt Griffin and Emmanuel Collard followed in third and fourth positions.

The following day the second qualifying session opened with a dry track but threatening skies. Several LMP2 and LMGTE teams were able to improve their qualifying times in the opening half an hour of the session before rainfall started. The biggest improvement in the beginning of the session was the Abu Dhabi-Proton Porsche in LMGTE Am, taking third place in the class, while the ByKolles CLM-AER of Kaffer went out in the wet to set first lap times of qualifying and take its place at the back of the LMP1 field. Pegasus Racing led the few improved times in the LMP2 category to earn the fifteenth position. Porsche No. 1 was the fastest in the session, but its lap time was over three seconds off the provisional pole position. The second session ended without the track drying again and no times were improved in any category. All four Aston Martins chose not to set lap times in the session as they changed their engines. The third qualifying session began an hour later under a light rain that changed to a deluge within ten minutes, prompting race officials to stop qualifying for nearly an hour as several cars aquaplaned. When the rain tapered off and qualifying resumed, many teams chose not to participate or set a large number of lap times as no improvements could be made to qualifying lap times.

Following qualifying the ACO altered the balance of performance in the LMGTE Pro category, adding 10 kg (22 lb) of ballast and lowering turbocharger boost pressure in the Ford GT and adding 25 kg (55 lb) of ballast to the Ferrari 488s to lower their performance. Similarly, Aston Martin and Corvette received an increase in performance by allowing a larger air restrictor on the air intake of their engines. Porsche had no performance changes.

=== Qualifying results ===
Provisional pole positions in each class are denoted in bold. The fastest time set by each entry is denoted with a gray background. Times for Qualifying 3 are not included as many teams did not set a lap time, and no team made an improvement on their time.

Final qualifying classification
Pos.	Class	No.	Team	Qualifying 1	Qualifying 2	Gap	Grid
1	**LMP1**	**2**	**Porsche Team**	**3:19.733**	3:25.511		1
2	LMP1	1	Porsche Team	3:20.203	**3:23.307**	+0.470	2
3	LMP1	6	Toyota Gazoo Racing	3:20.737	3:25.899	+1.004	3
4	LMP1	5	Toyota Gazoo Racing	3:21.903	3:24.399	+2.170	4
5	LMP1	7	Audi Sport Team Joest	3:22.780	3:45.468	+3.047	5
6	LMP1	8	Audi Sport Team Joest	3:22.823	3:26.680	+3.090	6
7	LMP1	13	Rebellion Racing	3:26.586	3:30.010	+6.853	7
8	LMP1	12	Rebellion Racing	3:27.348	3:27.573	+7.615	8
9	LMP1	4	ByKolles Racing Team	No Time	3:34.168	+14.435	54 (Note: The No. 4 ByKolles CLM-AER, No. 28 Pegasus Morgan-Nissan, No. 30 Extreme Speed Ligier-Nissan, No. 22 SO24! Ligier-Judd, and No. 40 Krohn Ligier-Nissan were all demoted to the back of the starting grid for having a driver fail to set a lap time within 110 per cent of their respective class pole position time.)
10	**LMP2**	**26**	**G-Drive Racing**	**3:36.605**	4:04.887	**+16.872**	9
11	LMP2	35	Baxi DC Racing Alpine	3:37.175	**3:39.559**	+17.442	10
12	LMP2	36	Signatech Alpine	3:37.225	3:40.895	+17.492	11
13	LMP2	44	Manor	3:38.037	No Time	+18.304	12
14	LMP2	49	Michael Shank Racing	3:38.837	3:51.759	+19.104	13
15	LMP2	31	Extreme Speed Motorsports	3:39.366	3:40.436	+19.633	14
16	LMP2	46	Thiriet by TDS Racing	3:39.375	3:40.611	+19.642	15
17	LMP2	42	Strakka Racing	3:39.394	3:44.142	+19.661	16
18	LMP2	47	KCMG	3:39.436	3:39.562	+19.703	17
19	LMP2	23	Panis-Barthez Compétition	3:39.470	3:45.018	+19.737	18
20	LMP2	33	Eurasia Motorsport	3:40.631	4:14.491	+20.898	19
21	LMP2	38	G-Drive Racing	3:40.685	4:01.981	+20.952	20
22	LMP2	43	RGR Sport by Morand	3:40.899	3:44.198	+21.166	21
23	LMP2	27	SMP Racing	3:41.132	3:41.457	+21.399	55 (Note: The No. 27 SMP BR01-Nissan and No. 63 Corvette were demoted to the back of the grid for having a driver fail to complete a minimum of five laps at night during qualifying.)
24	LMP2	28	Pegasus Racing	3:42.049	3:41.285	+21.552	56
25	LMP2	30	Extreme Speed Motorsports	3:41.406	4:14.456	+21.673	57
26	LMP2	37	SMP Racing	3:42.147	3:41.776	+22.043	22
27	LMP2	25	Algarve Pro Racing	3:44.185	3:42.088	+22.355	23
28	LMP2	41	Greaves Motorsport	3:43.915	3:42.570	+22.837	24
29	LMP2	48	Murphy Prototypes	3:43.508	3:45.067	+23.775	25
30	LMP2	34	Race Performance	3:43.590	3:45.711	+23.857	26
31	LMP2	22	SO24! by Lombard Racing	3:48.585	3:44.347	+24.614	58
32		84	SRT41 by OAK Racing	3:45.178	4:01.607	+25.445	27
33	LMP2	40	Krohn Racing	3:45.213	3:45.978	+25.480	59
34	**LMGTE Pro**	**68**	**Ford Chip Ganassi Team USA**	**3:51.185**	3:53.672	**+31.452**	28
35	LMGTE Pro	69	Ford Chip Ganassi Team USA	3:51.497	3:53.603	+31.764	29
36	LMGTE Pro	51	AF Corse	3:51.568	**3:53.218**	+31.835	30
37	LMGTE Pro	67	Ford Chip Ganassi Team UK	3:51.590	3:55.750	+31.857	31
38	LMGTE Pro	66	Ford Chip Ganassi Team UK	3:52.038	3:58.358	+32.305	32
39	LMGTE Pro	71	AF Corse	3:52.508	3:55.066	+32.775	33
40	LMGTE Pro	82	Risi Competizione	3:53.176	3:55.032	+33.443	34
41	LMGTE Pro	92	Porsche Motorsport	3:54.918	3:57.128	+35.185	35
42	LMGTE Pro	95	Aston Martin Racing	3:55.261	No Time	+35.528	36
43	LMGTE Pro	91	Porsche Motorsport	3:55.332	3:56.792	+35.599	37
44	LMGTE Pro	97	Aston Martin Racing	3:55.380	No Time	+35.647	38
45	LMGTE Pro	77	Dempsey-Proton Racing	3:55.426	3:57.082	+35.693	39
46	LMGTE Pro	64	Corvette Racing – GM	3:55.848	3:58.493	+36.115	40
47	**LMGTE Am**	**61**	**Clearwater Racing**	**3:56.827**	4:06.801	**+37.094**	41
48	LMGTE Am	98	Aston Martin Racing	3:57.198	No Time	+37.465	42
49	LMGTE Am	88	Abu Dhabi-Proton Racing	3:59.861	**3:57.513**	+37.780	43
50	LMGTE Am	55	AF Corse	3:57.596	3:59.469	+37.863	44
51	LMGTE Am	83	AF Corse	3:57.742	4:03.676	+38.009	45
52	LMGTE Pro	63	Corvette Racing – GM	3:57.967	3:59.268	+38.234	60
53	LMGTE Am	50	Larbre Compétition	3:58.018	4:27.530	+38.285	46
54	LMGTE Am	60	Formula Racing	3:58.760	4:03.851	+39.027	47
55	LMGTE Am	78	KCMG	3:59.245	3:59.034	+39.301	48
56	LMGTE Am	62	Scuderia Corsa	4:00.008	4:05.643	+40.275	49
57	LMGTE Am	89	Proton Competition	4:01.215	4:00.107	+40.374	50
58	LMGTE Am	86	Gulf Racing	4:01.046	4:09.283	+41.313	51
59	LMGTE Am	57	Team AAI	4:02.326	4:05.822	+42.593	52
60	LMGTE Am	99	Aston Martin Racing	4:03.148	No Time	+43.415	53

== Warm-up ==
The cars took to the circuit on Saturday morning for a 45-minute warm-up session. The No. 7 Audi driven by André Lotterer set the fastest time with a lap of 3:25.886. Kobayashi and Lieb were second and third for Toyota and Porsche. Duval was fourth-fastest and had the fastest lap until the session's quickest three drivers recorded their times. The fastest LMP2 lap was set by Rast with a time of 3:40.724. Müller, driving the No. 68 Ford GT, was the quickest driver in the LMGTE Pro category, with the No. 88 Abu Dhabi-Proton Porsche of Patrick Long the fastest of all the LMGTE Am drivers. Paul-Loup Chatin went off the track leaving the Porsche Curves and lightly damaged the right-hand side of his No. 23 Panis-Barthez car in a collision with the turn's barriers. This triggered the deployment of red flags to allow his vehicle to be removed to a safe area. David Cheng went through standing water turning right heading into Indianapolis corner and slid sideways. He attempted to regain control of his car but heavily damaged his vehicle's right-hand side. The session was ended prematurely because of the limited time available.

== Race ==
=== Daytime ===
The weather at the start of the race were wet. The air temperature throughout the race ranged from 12.2 to 20.4 °C (54.0 to 68.7 °F) and the track temperature between 13 and 32 °C (55 and 90 °F). 263,500 people attended the event. The French tricolour was waved at 15:00 Central European Summer Time (CEST) by actor Brad Pitt to start the race. Heavy rain fell on the circuit in the hour before the event started, forcing the race organisers to start it behind the safety car for the first time in history. During the reconnaissance lap, the Ford No. 66 GT was pushed into the garage after it lost gearbox pressure making it difficult to change gears. The safety car remained on the track for 53 minutes after which the cars were allowed to overtake when the track begun to dry. Jani maintained his pole position advantage heading into the first corner. Mike Conway's No. 6 Toyota tried unsuccessfully to pass Bernhard heading into Mulsanne corner, allowing Lotterer to attack him entering the Dunlop Bridge. The Audis passed the No. 5 Toyota of Sébastien Buemi for fourth and fifth. Conway overtook Bernhard on the way into the first Mulsanne Chicane for second and took the lead from Jani at the eighth lap's conclusion.

Duval passed Bernhard for third place while Lotterer began a sequence of pit stops to change to dry compound tyres soon after as the circuit began to dry. After the pit stops, Lotterer moved to the front of the race with Hartley in second and Duval third after both Toyotas had slow stops. Lotterer extended his advantage to seven seconds before entering the pit lane for an unscheduled stop. He was pushed into his garage for a change of turbocharger and repairs to his car's rear hydraulics system, promoting Hartley to the lead. Duval retook first by passing Hartley on the pit lane straight but lost the position to him at Mulsanne corner when a short rain shower fell. The LMP2 lead was taken by Roberto Merhi's No. 44 Manor at the start of the hour after he switched to the intermediate tyres during the first lap of competitive racing. In LMGTE Pro, Makowiecki's No. 92 Porsche was 13.8 seconds ahead of Richard Westbrook's No. 69 Ford. Westbrook eroded Makowiecki's advantage by going two seconds per lap faster than him. He took the class lead on the approach to Mulsanne Corner before the second hour was over. The battle for the outright lead continued to be a multi-car duel between representatives of the three manufacturers as they were separated by less than three seconds. This fluctuated due to the various levels of traffic.

Hartley and later Webber's No. 1 Porsche and Kobayashi's No. 6 Toyota exchanged the lead through the following pit stop cycle and the next three hours as the Toyotas were on track longer. This meant they ran a lap more at full speed in their attempt at making one less stop later in the race. The lead of LMGTE Pro was left to Vilander's Risi Ferrari after Briscoe relieved Westbrook in the No. 69 Ford. Vilander pulled away from Briscoe, whose performance faded in the early phase of his first stint, and he was caught by Joey Hand's sister No. 68 car which was on average 1.6 seconds faster. Hand moved out of Briscoe's slipstream and overtook him on the Mulsanne Straight for second in class. Hand caught the Vilander's category-leading vehicle and the two battled for several minutes until Hand overhauled Vilander and Briscoe followed soon after. In LMP2 Matthew Rao took over from Merhi in the class leading No. 44 Manor, but he was under pressure from Ryo Hirakawa's No. 46 TDS Racing car in second and Will Stevens' third-placed No. 26 G-Drive entry with the trio close by one other. Four hours and fifty minutes into the race, Rao spun at the Dunlop Chicane. This promoted Hirakawa into the lead of LMP2 while Rao fell to fourth.

=== Night ===
During the sixth hour of the race Kobayashi in the No. 6 Toyota was better able to mount a challenge to Webber and later Bernhard's No. 1 Porsche. Kobayashi lowered the No. 1 Porsche's advantage to 13.7 seconds after setting a new fastest lap of the race at 3:21.445 and consistently lapped in this range and strategically scythed his way through slower traffic. Matteo Malucelli returned the No. 82 Ferrari back to the front of LMGTE Pro after passing the two class leading Fords of Dixon and Stefan Mücke. Malucelli was later demoted from the top of LMGTE Pro to third when Sébastien Bourdais and later Dixon got ahead of him. Kobayashi and later Sarrazin took the overall lead from Bernhard after a local slow zone procedure was activated for trackside officials to recover Taittinger's No. 28 Pegasus Morgan. Tattiner misjudged the braking point for the right-hand Mulsanne Corner and was beached in the gravel trap. Bernhard lost forty seconds to Kobayashi because he lost sight on the approach to the slow zone due to the diminishing sunlight. He flat-spotted his tyres but stopped the No. 1 car from clouting the wall. LMGTE Am had been led by Porsche from the start. The No. 88 Abu Dhabi-Proton car and the No. 78 KCMG entry exchanged the class lead until Lamy's No. 98 Aston Martin broke up the monopoly midway through the seventh hour when he overtook Christian Ried for second and began to draw closer to Long.

As night fell on the circuit, the battle for the overall victory was left to both Toyotas and Porsches because Duval's No. 8 Audi dropped off the pace in fifth. Jani lapped more than a second faster than his teammate Bernhard and overtook him for second on the 120th lap. This came as the Audis were instructed by race control to enter their garages for repairs to their number lighting systems. Repairs to both Audis took less than six minutes each, and the team's drivers rejoined in the same positions they were in earlier. Tsugio Matsuda's No. 47 KCMG car suffered an apparent power failure due to what was determined to be debris striking the safety system and pulled off to the side of the circuit on the straight linking the Mulsanne and Indianapolis turns. That allowed Roman Rusinov's No. 26 G-Drive Oreca back into third in LMP2 after the team recovered from a drive-through penalty and a subsequent puncture. For 20 minutes the safety cars were dispatched to slow the race for a second time as two near simultaneous incidents involving GTE cars occurred. The first saw Paul Dalla Lana's No. 98 Aston Martin hit the barrier beside the track on his way to the Porsche Curves. He spun across the track and beached the car facing oncoming traffic. Then Perrodo's No. 83 AF Corse Ferrari went straight into the gravel trap at Mulsanne Corner after he could not steer right. In the meantime, Hartley's No. 1 Porsche was forced out of contention for the victory when it went to the garage for two and a half hours to rectify water pump and engine temperature problems, losing 39 laps and falling to 53rd.

In LMP2 the safety cars had split the field, leaving Pierre Thiriet's No. 46 TDS Racing vehicle two minutes and 48 seconds ahead of Lapierre's second-place No. 36 Signatech Alpine car as it made a pit stop. It did not, however, have much effect on the GTE classes as the gaps at the front of their respective fields was narrow. When racing resumed Jani's No. 2 Porsche was able to attack Conway's No. 6 Toyota leaving Tertre Rouge turn and pass him for the lead into the first Mulsanne Chicane. Jani held the position until he made a pit stop and was relieved by Dumas. Bradley ran wide into the entrance of the Porsche Curves due to a power steering failure that sent the No. 47 KCMG car deep into the gravel trap. The car was abandoned since it could not be restarted. Not long after Estre's No. 91 Porsche begun leaking oil on the run to the Porsche Curves as the car's engine failed. Pizzitola's No. 25 Algarve Pro entry was caught out by Estre's oil and slid sideways into the gravel. That caused the third deployment of the safety cars as marshals worked for 28 minutes to dry the spilled oil by scattering an oil-neutralising compound across the track. As the safety cars were recalled Dumas put pressure on Buemi's No. 5 Toyota and overtook him on the Mulsanne Straight for second. Soon after passing Kraihamer's No. 13 Rebellion for fifth Fässler's No. 7 Audi developed a hybrid system issue that forced its return to the pit lane.

The LMGTE Am lead changed midway through the twelfth hour from Khaled Al Qubaisi's No. 88 Abu Dhabi-Proton Porsche to Bell's No. 62 Scuderia Corsa Ferrari. Not long after Stevens' No. 26 G-Drive Oreca served a one-minute stop-and-go penalty for speeding in a slow zone. He fell a further minute and a half behind Hirakawa's No. 46 TDS Racing car but stayed in third place in LMP2. Several LMGTE cars took the opportunity to change brake discs at this point in the morning, including the LMGTE Pro leading Risi Ferrari of Fisichella. Halfway through the 13th hour, Kobayashi relinquished the No. 6 Toyota's hold on first to Lieb's No. 2 Porsche for five laps when he made an unscheduled pit stop to repair minor left-hand side bodywork damage. Lieb could not establish a healthy advantage as a local slow zone procedure was needed for the No. 13 Rebellion of Tuscher who retired just before the entrance to the second Mulsanne Chicane with a fuel injector failure that shut down the R-One's engine. Just after the slow zone was lifted, Lieb ran over some gravel that was strewn on the track and picked up a slow puncture. He was forced into the pit lane for a replacement wheel and fuel. Davidson's No. 5 Toyota inherited second. He started closing up to his teammate Kobayashi before Lieb retook the lead through the following pit stop cycle.

=== Morning and early afternoon ===
A series of incidents in LMGTE Pro and LMP2 during the first hours of the morning prompted localised slow zone procedures and later the fourth deployment of the safety cars. Simon Dolan's No. 38 G-Drive car was hit by Dalla Lana's No. 98 Aston Martin that he lapped in the braking zone for the Ford Chicanes. Dolan was sent scuttling across the kerbing and heavily into the tyre barrier alongside the track. Later, Milner inflicted extensive damage to his No. 64 Corvette. He crashed into the end of the right-hand side tyre barrier at the entry to the Dunlop Chicane after losing control of its rear on the kerbs through driver error under braking. Soon after, Panciatici's fourth-placed No. 35 Baxi DC Alpine LMP2 ran straight across the gravel trap at the first Mulsanne Chicane and into the concrete wall. The final incident happened when Thiriet hit the inside barrier beside the circuit and removed the front bodywork from the No. 46 TDS Racing entry. He then ran over several trackside bollards on his way to beaching in the gravel trap. The safety car separated the LMP1 field as Conway's and Buemi's Toyotas made pit stops. After racing resumed they slipstreamed one another in slower traffic on the Mulsanne Straight and Buemi overtook Conway around the outside for second. Conway and Buemi retook first and second when Jani's No. 2 Porsche made a pit stop from the lead by the close of the 17th hour and emerged close behind the pair.

The outright leaders settled down as the 18th hour approached. The two Toyotas opened up a significant lead over Jani's No. 2 Porsche, who could not match their pace after his race-long speed advantage had been nullified at that point. Müller's No. 68 Ford fell back from the battle for the lead of LMGTE Pro with the No. 82 Risi Ferrari of Malucelli on the 245th lap. Müller was penalised with a drive-through penalty for having the engine running during his refuelling pit stop. He responded by going a second per lap faster than Malucelli. It lowered his lead in LMGTE Pro to seven seconds going into the next pit stop phase. Hand later relieved Müller in the No. 68 Ford and got the car back to the front of LMGTE Pro by overtaking Malucelli on the first part of the Mulsanne Straight. He began to pull clear with 4 1/2 hours remaining. Lieb's No. 2 Porsche returned to the outright lead, but he ceded it to Davidson's faster No. 5 Toyota entering Mulsanne corner. The sister No. 6 Toyota had an anxious moment when Kobayashi lost control of the car into the right-hand Karting corner and came to a rest in the gravel trap. He returned to third without needing external aid but lost 20 seconds to teammate Davidson. The pressure put on Ford by Ferrari in LMGTE Pro eased when Vilander lost control of the rear of the No. 82 car leaving the Porsche Curves but retained second in class despite getting temporarily beached in the gravel trap.

Kobayashi bowed out of the battle for the outright victory when he entered the garage to fix the No. 6 Toyota's floor, which was damaged during the night when it hit a slower car and have a precautionary cooling system check done so it could get to the end of the race. Although repairs to the car lost it three laps to Davidson's sister No. 5 Toyota it retained its hold on third as the No. 8 Audi was ten laps behind in fourth. Davidson and later Nakajima matched Jani's pace. He could not get a consistent rate of lap times or get closer to the front of the pack. This was after Porsche changed its strategy to match the one employed by Toyota throughout the event, which had the No. 2 car stay on track for 14 laps at a time. Fuel mileage was also a concern for the LMGTE Pro leaders as Briscoe's No. 69 Ford stopped one lap later than all other cars in the class. That drew him closer to Vilander's No. 82 Risi Ferrari as Hand's sister No. 68 Ford was responding to his pace. During the 22nd hour Mathias Lauda's No. 98 Aston Martin pulled off behind the left-hand concrete wall on the approach to the Porsche Curves with a terminal gearbox problem. Soon after that Tattinger's No. 28 Morgan Pegasus repeated its earlier excursion into the right-hand side gravel trap at Mulsanne Corner and retired a few minutes later with a right-rear tyre fire.

=== Finish ===
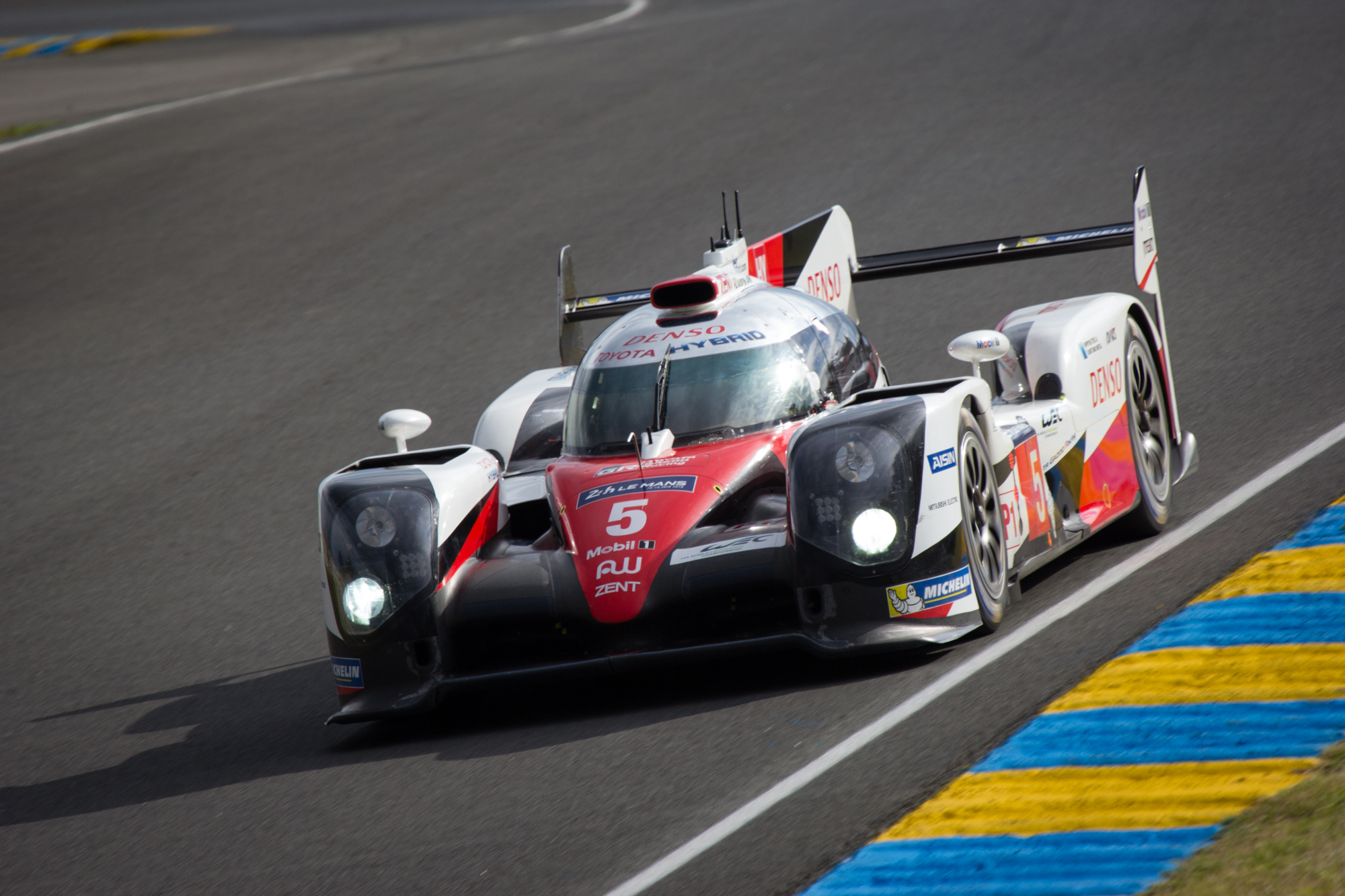
The No. 5 Toyota TS050 Hybrid had a mechanical failure in the final six minutes that stopped the Japanese manufacturer from taking its first Le Mans victory.

With six minutes remaining Nakajima's No. 5 Toyota was ahead of Jani's No. 2 Porsche by 70 seconds and looked set to claim the manufacturer's first overall Le Mans victory in its 14th attempt. But Nakajima slowed to less than 200 km/h (120 mph) on the Mulsanne Straight due to a failure of the connector line linking the turbocharger and the intercooler, reducing power and causing a sudden loss of control over the turbocharger. Nakajima slowed even more two minutes later, and stopped the No. 5 Toyota after the start/finish line close to the Toyota pit as the car's power gave out entirely at the conclusion of the lap. Jani overcame the gap and overtook Nakajima seconds later to take the chequered flag for the No. 2 Porsche and the marque's 18th overall victory at Le Mans. It was Jani and Lieb's first Le Mans victory and Dumas' second after triumphing in 2010. The sister No. 6 Toyota of Sarrazin, Conway and Kobayashi finished three laps behind in second, while the No. 8 Audi of Duval, di Grassi and Jarvis took third to maintain Audi's record of getting one car on the podium since debuting in 1999. The No. 36 Signatech Alpine of Lapierre, Gustavo Menezes and Stéphane Richelmi led the final 196 laps to take the victory in LMP2. The second-placed No. 26 G-Drive Oreca of Rusinov, Rast and Stevens was the only other LMP2 entry that finished on the same lap as the Alpine. It gave Lapierre his second successive category win and Menezes and Richelmi's first. The all-Russian SMP Racing BR01 of Vitaly Petrov, Kirill Ladygin and Viktor Shaytar, which came four laps behind in third, completed the class podium.

On the day of the 50th anniversary of their first overall 24 Hours of Le Mans victory in 1966, Ford won the LMGTE Pro class with the No. 68 American entry of Hand, Bourdais and Müller. Risi Competizione's No. 82 Ferrari were provisionally one minute adrift in second position with Fisichella, Vilander and Malucelli after they and the category winning Ford had led all but 26 laps of the race. Ford CGR USA's sister No. 69 car of Briscoe, Dixon and Westbrook was third. After the race because of a protest from the Risi team the No. 68 Ford was penalised a total of 70 seconds towards its total race time for being deemed to have sped in a slow zone and for having faulty wheel speed sensors. Risi's No. 82 Ferrari had twenty seconds added to its total time and fined €5,000 for ignoring multiple black flags with an orange disc that were deployed to instruct the team to rectify a faulty leader light board after Ford CGR filed a protest over the technical problem in the final hour of the event. The result of the penalties reduced the No. 68 Ford's margin of victory over the No. 82 Risi Ferrari to 10.2 seconds. Americans also led LMGTE Am with the Scuderia Corsa's No. 62 Ferrari of Bell, Jeff Segal, and Bill Sweedler edging out the fellow No. 83 Ferrari of AF Corse, driven by Emmanuel Collard, Rui Águas and Perrodo. Al Qubaisi, Long, and David Heinemeier Hansson were third in class for Abu Dhabi-Proton. There were 28 outright lead changes during the race; four cars reached the front of the field. The No. 6 Toyota led thirteen times for 173 laps, more than any other car. The No. 2 Porsche led twelve times for a total of 51 laps.

== Post-race ==
The top three finishers in all four categories appeared on the podium to collect their trophies and at their own separate press conferences. Lieb said of the No. 2 Porsche's outright victory, "The last quadruple stint I did was really on the edge. Even the first three stints were quite difficult with overtaking in the traffic and taking risks. In the last one I then also had to save fuel, and especially the front tyres that began to lose performance. I gave everything I had—and now I think I have to digest what all has happened today." Kobayashi said Toyota was unhappy to finish in second place, "Unfortunately our second position was not what we wanted. We are here to win so I am not really happy." His co-driver Conway spoke of his mixed feelings over the result, "I have mixed feelings. Second is okay but we are all gutted for car #5. They drove a great race ... It's okay to get one car on the podium but we wanted more." Third-placed di Grassi described Audi's race as "horrible" and said the improved competition from Porsche and Toyota would require his team to improve for the rest of the season. "To finish on the podium is a nice reward, but this race [performance] is not Audi, with how many times we went into the garage, how many repairs we had to do, and how much time we spent stopped. We have to improve a lot. We have to beat the others on the track."

The mechanical failure of the No. 5 Toyota in the closing minutes overshadowed the event. Toyota team principal Hugues de Chaunac was visibly distraught and tearful over the manufacturer being denied a first Le Mans win. He said, "You cannot accept that three minutes before the flag and just in front of you. You cannot believe it, we are just dreaming, it is so hard to accept it." Jarvis, Jani, Webber, and the head of Audi Motorsport Wolfgang Ullrich expressed their reaction to Toyota. Following the completion of an initial investigation into the failure five days later, Toyota denied any connection to similar engine problems the cars had at the preceding 6 Hours of Spa-Francorchamps held the month before. The No. 5 car was not classified in the final result because it completed the last lap in 11:53.815 and it scored no championship points. After discussion over the final lap, the ACO announced a new series of rule changes in December 2016 to deal with cars in the final minutes. The standards by which a car is classified have been changed. Instead of the mandatory six minutes for the final lap of the race, penalties will be awarded for any lap over six minutes on a gradual scale. Failure to complete the last lap of the race in under fifteen minutes will now lead to a car no longer being classified. Under the 2017 rules, there would have been a ten-lap penalty for the No. 5 car.

The result increased Lieb, Jani and Dumas' advantage over the new second-placed trio of Duval, di Grassi and Jarvis in the Drivers' Championship to 39 points. Kobayashi, Conway and Sarrazin's second-place finish advance the trio to third position in the standings. Lotterer, Fassler and Treulyer moved to fourth place and Kraihamer, Imperatori and Tuscher's non-finish dropped them to fifth. In the Manufacturers' Championship, Porsche extended their lead over Audi to 38 points and Toyota fell to third position with six races left in the season.

== Official results ==
The minimum number of laps for classification (70 per cent of the overall winning car's race distance) was 268 laps. Class winners are denoted with bold.

Final race classification
Pos	Class	No	Team	Drivers	Chassis	Tyre	Laps	Time/Retired
Pos	Class	No	Team	Drivers	Engine	Tyre	Laps	Time/Retired
1	LMP1	2	(Germany) Porsche Team	(Germany) Marc Lieb (France) Romain Dumas (Switzerland) Neel Jani	Porsche 919 Hybrid	M	384	24:00:38.449
1	LMP1	2	(Germany) Porsche Team	(Germany) Marc Lieb (France) Romain Dumas (Switzerland) Neel Jani	Porsche 2.0 L Turbo V4	M	384	24:00:38.449
2	LMP1	6	(Japan) Toyota Gazoo Racing	(France) Stéphane Sarrazin (United Kingdom) Mike Conway (Japan) Kamui Kobayashi	Toyota TS050 Hybrid	M	381	+3 Laps
2	LMP1	6	(Japan) Toyota Gazoo Racing	(France) Stéphane Sarrazin (United Kingdom) Mike Conway (Japan) Kamui Kobayashi	Toyota 2.4 L Turbo V6	M	381	+3 Laps
3	LMP1	8	(Germany) Audi Sport Team Joest	(France) Loïc Duval (Brazil) Lucas di Grassi (United Kingdom) Oliver Jarvis	Audi R18	M	372	+12 Laps
3	LMP1	8	(Germany) Audi Sport Team Joest	(France) Loïc Duval (Brazil) Lucas di Grassi (United Kingdom) Oliver Jarvis	Audi TDI 4.0 L Turbo Diesel V6	M	372	+12 Laps
4	LMP1	7	(Germany) Audi Sport Team Joest	(Germany) André Lotterer (Switzerland) Marcel Fässler (France) Benoît Tréluyer	Audi R18	M	367	+17 Laps
4	LMP1	7	(Germany) Audi Sport Team Joest	(Germany) André Lotterer (Switzerland) Marcel Fässler (France) Benoît Tréluyer	Audi TDI 4.0 L Turbo Diesel V6	M	367	+17 Laps
5	LMP2	36	(France) Signatech Alpine	(France) Nicolas Lapierre (United States) Gustavo Menezes (Monaco) Stéphane Richelmi	Alpine A460	D	357	+27 Laps
5	LMP2	36	(France) Signatech Alpine	(France) Nicolas Lapierre (United States) Gustavo Menezes (Monaco) Stéphane Richelmi	Nissan VK45DE 4.5 L V8	D	357	+27 Laps
6	LMP2	26	(Russia) G-Drive Racing	(Russia) Roman Rusinov (United Kingdom) Will Stevens (Germany) René Rast	Oreca 05	D	357	+27 Laps
6	LMP2	26	(Russia) G-Drive Racing	(Russia) Roman Rusinov (United Kingdom) Will Stevens (Germany) René Rast	Nissan VK45DE 4.5 L V8	D	357	+27 Laps
7	LMP2	37	(Russia) SMP Racing	(Russia) Vitaly Petrov (Russia) Viktor Shaytar (Russia) Kirill Ladygin	BR Engineering BR01	D	353	+31 Laps
7	LMP2	37	(Russia) SMP Racing	(Russia) Vitaly Petrov (Russia) Viktor Shaytar (Russia) Kirill Ladygin	Nissan VK45DE 4.5 L V8	D	353	+31 Laps
8	LMP2	42	(United Kingdom) Strakka Racing	(United Kingdom) Nick Leventis (United Kingdom) Jonny Kane (United Kingdom) Danny Watts	Gibson 015S	D	351	+33 Laps
8	LMP2	42	(United Kingdom) Strakka Racing	(United Kingdom) Nick Leventis (United Kingdom) Jonny Kane (United Kingdom) Danny Watts	Nissan VK45DE 4.5 L V8	D	351	+33 Laps
9	LMP2	33	(Philippines) Eurasia Motorsport	(China) Pu Junjin (France) Tristan Gommendy (Netherlands) Nick de Bruijn	Oreca 05	D	348	+37 Laps
9	LMP2	33	(Philippines) Eurasia Motorsport	(China) Pu Junjin (France) Tristan Gommendy (Netherlands) Nick de Bruijn	Nissan VK45DE 4.5 L V8	D	348	+37 Laps
10	LMP2	41	(United Kingdom) Greaves Motorsport	(Mexico) Memo Rojas (France) Julien Canal (France) Nathanaël Berthon	Ligier JS P2	D	348	+37 Laps
10	LMP2	41	(United Kingdom) Greaves Motorsport	(Mexico) Memo Rojas (France) Julien Canal (France) Nathanaël Berthon	Nissan VK45DE 4.5 L V8	D	348	+37 Laps
11	LMP2	27	(Russia) SMP Racing	(France) Nicolas Minassian (Italy) Maurizio Mediani (Russia) Mikhail Aleshin	BR Engineering BR01	D	347	+37 Laps
11	LMP2	27	(Russia) SMP Racing	(France) Nicolas Minassian (Italy) Maurizio Mediani (Russia) Mikhail Aleshin	Nissan VK45DE 4.5 L V8	D	347	+37 Laps
12	LMP2	23	(France) Panis-Barthez Compétition	(France) Fabien Barthez (France) Timothé Buret (France) Paul-Loup Chatin	Ligier JS P2	M	347	+37 Laps
12	LMP2	23	(France) Panis-Barthez Compétition	(France) Fabien Barthez (France) Timothé Buret (France) Paul-Loup Chatin	Nissan VK45DE 4.5 L V8	M	347	+37 Laps
13	LMP1	1	(Germany) Porsche Team	(Germany) Timo Bernhard (New Zealand) Brendon Hartley (Australia) Mark Webber	Porsche 919 Hybrid	M	346	+38 Laps
13	LMP1	1	(Germany) Porsche Team	(Germany) Timo Bernhard (New Zealand) Brendon Hartley (Australia) Mark Webber	Porsche 2.0 L Turbo V4	M	346	+38 Laps
14	LMP2	49	(United States) Michael Shank Racing	(United States) John Pew (Brazil) Oswaldo Negri Jr. (Belgium) Laurens Vanthoor	Ligier JS P2	D	345	+39 Laps
14	LMP2	49	(United States) Michael Shank Racing	(United States) John Pew (Brazil) Oswaldo Negri Jr. (Belgium) Laurens Vanthoor	Honda HR28TT 2.8 L Turbo V6	D	345	+39 Laps
15	LMP2	43	(Mexico) RGR Sport by Morand	(Mexico) Ricardo González (Portugal) Filipe Albuquerque (Brazil) Bruno Senna	Ligier JS P2	D	344	+40 Laps
15	LMP2	43	(Mexico) RGR Sport by Morand	(Mexico) Ricardo González (Portugal) Filipe Albuquerque (Brazil) Bruno Senna	Nissan VK45DE 4.5 L V8	D	344	+40 Laps
16	LMP2	30	(United States) Extreme Speed Motorsports	(United States) Scott Sharp (United States) Ed Brown (United States) Johannes van Overbeek	Ligier JS P2	D	341	+43 Laps
16	LMP2	30	(United States) Extreme Speed Motorsports	(United States) Scott Sharp (United States) Ed Brown (United States) Johannes van Overbeek	Nissan VK45DE 4.5 L V8	D	341	+43 Laps
17	LMP2	25	(Portugal) Algarve Pro Racing	(United Kingdom) Michael Munemann (United Kingdom) Chris Hoy (France) Andrea Pizzitola	Ligier JS P2	D	341	+43 Laps
17	LMP2	25	(Portugal) Algarve Pro Racing	(United Kingdom) Michael Munemann (United Kingdom) Chris Hoy (France) Andrea Pizzitola	Nissan VK45DE 4.5 L V8	D	341	+43 Laps
18	LMGTE; Pro	68	(United States) Ford Chip Ganassi Team USA	(United States) Joey Hand (Germany) Dirk Müller (France) Sébastien Bourdais	Ford GT	M	340	+44 Laps
18	LMGTE; Pro	68	(United States) Ford Chip Ganassi Team USA	(United States) Joey Hand (Germany) Dirk Müller (France) Sébastien Bourdais	Ford EcoBoost 3.5 L Turbo V6	M	340	+44 Laps
19	LMGTE; Pro	82	(United States) Risi Competizione	(Italy) Giancarlo Fisichella (Italy) Matteo Malucelli (Finland) Toni Vilander	Ferrari 488 GTE	M	340	+44 Laps
19	LMGTE; Pro	82	(United States) Risi Competizione	(Italy) Giancarlo Fisichella (Italy) Matteo Malucelli (Finland) Toni Vilander	Ferrari F154CB 3.9 L Turbo V8	M	340	+44 Laps
20	LMGTE; Pro	69	(United States) Ford Chip Ganassi Team USA	(Australia) Ryan Briscoe (United Kingdom) Richard Westbrook (New Zealand) Scott Dixon	Ford GT	M	340	+44 Laps
20	LMGTE; Pro	69	(United States) Ford Chip Ganassi Team USA	(Australia) Ryan Briscoe (United Kingdom) Richard Westbrook (New Zealand) Scott Dixon	Ford EcoBoost 3.5 L Turbo V6	M	340	+44 Laps
21	LMGTE; Pro	66	(United States) Ford Chip Ganassi Team UK	(France) Olivier Pla (Germany) Stefan Mücke (United States) Billy Johnson	Ford GT	M	339	+45 Laps
21	LMGTE; Pro	66	(United States) Ford Chip Ganassi Team UK	(France) Olivier Pla (Germany) Stefan Mücke (United States) Billy Johnson	Ford EcoBoost 3.5 L Turbo V6	M	339	+45 Laps
22	LMP2	40	(United States) Krohn Racing	(United States) Tracy Krohn (Sweden) Niclas Jönsson (Portugal) João Barbosa	Ligier JS P2	M	338	+46 Laps
22	LMP2	40	(United States) Krohn Racing	(United States) Tracy Krohn (Sweden) Niclas Jönsson (Portugal) João Barbosa	Nissan VK45DE 4.5 L V8	M	338	+46 Laps
23	LMGTE; Pro	95	(United Kingdom) Aston Martin Racing	(Denmark) Nicki Thiim (Denmark) Marco Sørensen (United Kingdom) Darren Turner	Aston Martin V8 Vantage GTE	D	338	+46 Laps
23	LMGTE; Pro	95	(United Kingdom) Aston Martin Racing	(Denmark) Nicki Thiim (Denmark) Marco Sørensen (United Kingdom) Darren Turner	Aston Martin 4.5 L V8	D	338	+46 Laps
24	LMGTE; Pro	97	(United Kingdom) Aston Martin Racing	(Brazil) Fernando Rees (United Kingdom) Jonny Adam (New Zealand) Richie Stanaway	Aston Martin V8 Vantage GTE	D	337	+47 Laps
24	LMGTE; Pro	97	(United Kingdom) Aston Martin Racing	(Brazil) Fernando Rees (United Kingdom) Jonny Adam (New Zealand) Richie Stanaway	Aston Martin 4.5 L V8	D	337	+47 Laps
25	LMGTE; Pro	63	(United States) Corvette Racing – GM	(Denmark) Jan Magnussen (Spain) Antonio García (United States) Ricky Taylor	Chevrolet Corvette C7.R	M	336	+48 Laps
25	LMGTE; Pro	63	(United States) Corvette Racing – GM	(Denmark) Jan Magnussen (Spain) Antonio García (United States) Ricky Taylor	Chevrolet LT5.5 5.5 L V8	M	336	+48 Laps
26	LMGTE; Am	62	(United States) Scuderia Corsa	(United States) Bill Sweedler (United States) Townsend Bell (United States) Jeff Segal	Ferrari 458 Italia GT2	M	331	+53 Laps
26	LMGTE; Am	62	(United States) Scuderia Corsa	(United States) Bill Sweedler (United States) Townsend Bell (United States) Jeff Segal	Ferrari F136GT 4.5 L V8	M	331	+53 Laps
27	LMGTE; Am	83	(Italy) AF Corse	(France) François Perrodo (France) Emmanuel Collard (Portugal) Rui Águas	Ferrari 458 Italia GT2	M	331	+53 Laps
27	LMGTE; Am	83	(Italy) AF Corse	(France) François Perrodo (France) Emmanuel Collard (Portugal) Rui Águas	Ferrari F136GT 4.5 L V8	M	331	+53 Laps
28	LMGTE; Am	88	(United Arab Emirates) Abu Dhabi-Proton Racing	(United Arab Emirates) Khaled Al Qubaisi (United States) Patrick Long (Denmark) David Heinemeier Hansson	Porsche 911 RSR	M	330	+54 Laps
28	LMGTE; Am	88	(United Arab Emirates) Abu Dhabi-Proton Racing	(United Arab Emirates) Khaled Al Qubaisi (United States) Patrick Long (Denmark) David Heinemeier Hansson	Porsche 4.0 L Flat-6	M	330	+54 Laps
29	LMP1	12	(Switzerland) Rebellion Racing	(France) Nicolas Prost (Germany) Nick Heidfeld (Brazil) Nelson Piquet Jr.	Rebellion R-One	D	330	+54 Laps
29	LMP1	12	(Switzerland) Rebellion Racing	(France) Nicolas Prost (Germany) Nick Heidfeld (Brazil) Nelson Piquet Jr.	AER P60 2.4 L Turbo V6	D	330	+54 Laps
30	LMGTE; Am	61	(Singapore) Clearwater Racing	(Malaysia) Weng Sun Mok (United Kingdom) Rob Bell (Japan) Keita Sawa	Ferrari 458 Italia GT2	M	329	+55 Laps
30	LMGTE; Am	61	(Singapore) Clearwater Racing	(Malaysia) Weng Sun Mok (United Kingdom) Rob Bell (Japan) Keita Sawa	Ferrari F136GT 4.5 L V8	M	329	+55 Laps
31	LMGTE; Pro	77	(Germany) Dempsey-Proton Racing	(Austria) Richard Lietz (Austria) Philipp Eng (Denmark) Michael Christensen	Porsche 911 RSR	M	329	+55 Laps
31	LMGTE; Pro	77	(Germany) Dempsey-Proton Racing	(Austria) Richard Lietz (Austria) Philipp Eng (Denmark) Michael Christensen	Porsche 4.0 L Flat-6	M	329	+55 Laps
32	LMP2	22	(France) SO24! by Lombard Racing	(France) Vincent Capillaire (France) Erik Maris (United Kingdom) Jonathan Coleman	Ligier JS P2	D	328	+56 Laps
32	LMP2	22	(France) SO24! by Lombard Racing	(France) Vincent Capillaire (France) Erik Maris (United Kingdom) Jonathan Coleman	Judd HK 3.6 L V8	D	328	+56 Laps
33	LMGTE; Am	86	(United Kingdom) Gulf Racing	(United Kingdom) Michael Wainwright (United Kingdom) Adam Carroll (United Kingdom) Ben Barker	Porsche 911 RSR	M	328	+56 Laps
33	LMGTE; Am	86	(United Kingdom) Gulf Racing	(United Kingdom) Michael Wainwright (United Kingdom) Adam Carroll (United Kingdom) Ben Barker	Porsche 4.0 L Flat-6	M	328	+56 Laps
34	LMP2	48	(Republic of Ireland) Murphy Prototypes	(United States) Ben Keating (Belgium) Marc Goossens (Netherlands) Jeroen Bleekemolen	Oreca 03R	D	323	+61 Laps
34	LMP2	48	(Republic of Ireland) Murphy Prototypes	(United States) Ben Keating (Belgium) Marc Goossens (Netherlands) Jeroen Bleekemolen	Nissan VK45DE 4.5 L V8	D	323	+61 Laps
35	LMGTE; Am	60	(Denmark) Formula Racing	(Denmark) Johnny Laursen (Denmark) Christina Nielsen (Denmark) Mikkel Mac	Ferrari 458 Italia GT2	M	319	+65 Laps
35	LMGTE; Am	60	(Denmark) Formula Racing	(Denmark) Johnny Laursen (Denmark) Christina Nielsen (Denmark) Mikkel Mac	Ferrari F136GT 4.5 L V8	M	319	+65 Laps
36	LMGTE; Am	99	(United Kingdom) Aston Martin Racing	(United Kingdom) Andrew Howard (United Kingdom) Liam Griffin (Switzerland) Gary Hirsch	Aston Martin V8 Vantage GTE	D	318	+66 Laps
36	LMGTE; Am	99	(United Kingdom) Aston Martin Racing	(United Kingdom) Andrew Howard (United Kingdom) Liam Griffin (Switzerland) Gary Hirsch	Aston Martin 4.5 L V8	D	318	+66 Laps
37	LMGTE; Am	50	(France) Larbre Compétition	(Japan) Yutaka Yamagishi (France) Pierre Ragues (France) Jean-Philippe Belloc	Chevrolet Corvette C7.R	M	316	+68 Laps
37	LMGTE; Am	50	(France) Larbre Compétition	(Japan) Yutaka Yamagishi (France) Pierre Ragues (France) Jean-Philippe Belloc	Chevrolet LT5.5 5.5 L V8	M	316	+68 Laps
38		84	(France) SRT41 by OAK Racing	(France) Frédéric Sausset (France) Christophe Tinseau (France) Jean-Bernard Bouvet	Morgan LMP2	M	315	+69 Laps
38		84	(France) SRT41 by OAK Racing	(France) Frédéric Sausset (France) Christophe Tinseau (France) Jean-Bernard Bouvet	Nissan VK45DE 4.5 L V8	M	315	+69 Laps
39	LMGTE; Am	57	(Taiwan) Team AAI	(United States) Johnny O'Connell (United States) Mark Patterson (United Kingdom) Oliver Bryant	Chevrolet Corvette C7.R	M	306	+78 Laps
39	LMGTE; Am	57	(Taiwan) Team AAI	(United States) Johnny O'Connell (United States) Mark Patterson (United Kingdom) Oliver Bryant	Chevrolet LT5.5 5.5 L V8	M	306	+78 Laps
40	LMGTE; Pro	67	(United States) Ford Chip Ganassi Team UK	(United Kingdom) Andy Priaulx (United Kingdom) Marino Franchitti (United Kingdom) Harry Tincknell	Ford GT	M	306	+78 Laps
40	LMGTE; Pro	67	(United States) Ford Chip Ganassi Team UK	(United Kingdom) Andy Priaulx (United Kingdom) Marino Franchitti (United Kingdom) Harry Tincknell	Ford EcoBoost 3.5 L Turbo V6	M	306	+78 Laps
41	LMGTE; Am	78	(Hong Kong) KCMG	(Germany) Christian Ried (Germany) Wolf Henzler (Switzerland) Joël Camathias	Porsche 911 RSR	M	300	+84 Laps
41	LMGTE; Am	78	(Hong Kong) KCMG	(Germany) Christian Ried (Germany) Wolf Henzler (Switzerland) Joël Camathias	Porsche 4.0 L Flat-6	M	300	+84 Laps
42	LMP2	31	(United States) Extreme Speed Motorsports	(United Kingdom) Ryan Dalziel (Canada) Chris Cumming (Brazil) Pipo Derani	Ligier JS P2	D	297	+87 Laps
42	LMP2	31	(United States) Extreme Speed Motorsports	(United Kingdom) Ryan Dalziel (Canada) Chris Cumming (Brazil) Pipo Derani	Nissan VK45DE 4.5 L V8	D	297	+87 Laps
43	LMGTE; Am	55	(Italy) AF Corse	(United Kingdom) Duncan Cameron (United Kingdom) Aaron Scott (Republic of Ireland) Matt Griffin	Ferrari 458 Italia GT2	M	289	+94 Laps
43	LMGTE; Am	55	(Italy) AF Corse	(United Kingdom) Duncan Cameron (United Kingdom) Aaron Scott (Republic of Ireland) Matt Griffin	Ferrari F136GT 4.5 L V8	M	289	+94 Laps
44	LMP2	34	(Switzerland) Race Performance	(Switzerland) Nicolas Leutwiler (United Kingdom) James Winslow (Japan) Shinji Nakano	Oreca 03R	D	289 (Note: The No. 34 Race Performance Oreca-Judd was penalized for failing to meet the minimum drive time for the team's silver-rated driver. Eight laps plus two minutes were added to the team's total to account for the lost time.)	+94 Laps
44	LMP2	34	(Switzerland) Race Performance	(Switzerland) Nicolas Leutwiler (United Kingdom) James Winslow (Japan) Shinji Nakano	Judd HK 3.6 L V8	D	289	+94 Laps
NC	LMP1	5	(Japan) Toyota Gazoo Racing	(United Kingdom) Anthony Davidson (Switzerland) Sébastien Buemi (Japan) Kazuki Nakajima	Toyota TS050 Hybrid	M	384	Incomplete final lap (Note: The No. 5 Toyota was not classified in the race result for failing to complete the final lap of the race within six minutes.)
NC	LMP1	5	(Japan) Toyota Gazoo Racing	(United Kingdom) Anthony Davidson (Switzerland) Sébastien Buemi (Japan) Kazuki Nakajima	Toyota 2.4 L Turbo V6	M	384	Incomplete final lap
DNF	LMP2	28	(Germany) Pegasus Racing	(France) Inès Taittinger (France) Léo Roussel (France) Rémy Striebig	Morgan LMP2	M	292	Fire
DNF	LMP2	28	(Germany) Pegasus Racing	(France) Inès Taittinger (France) Léo Roussel (France) Rémy Striebig	Nissan VK45DE 4.5 L V8	M	292	Fire
DNF	LMP2	44	(United Kingdom) Manor	(Thailand) Tor Graves (United Kingdom) Matthew Rao (Spain) Roberto Merhi	Oreca 05	D	283	Accident
DNF	LMP2	44	(United Kingdom) Manor	(Thailand) Tor Graves (United Kingdom) Matthew Rao (Spain) Roberto Merhi	Nissan VK45DE 4.5 L V8	D	283	Accident
DNF	LMGTE; Am	98	(United Kingdom) Aston Martin Racing	(Canada) Paul Dalla Lana (Portugal) Pedro Lamy (Austria) Mathias Lauda	Aston Martin V8 Vantage GTE	D	281	Gearbox
DNF	LMGTE; Am	98	(United Kingdom) Aston Martin Racing	(Canada) Paul Dalla Lana (Portugal) Pedro Lamy (Austria) Mathias Lauda	Aston Martin 4.5 L V8	D	281	Gearbox
DNF	LMP2	46	(France) Thiriet by TDS Racing	(France) Pierre Thiriet (Switzerland) Mathias Beche (Japan) Ryo Hirakawa	Oreca 05	D	241	Crash
DNF	LMP2	46	(France) Thiriet by TDS Racing	(France) Pierre Thiriet (Switzerland) Mathias Beche (Japan) Ryo Hirakawa	Nissan VK45DE 4.5 L V8	D	241	Crash
DNF	LMP2	35	(China) Baxi DC Racing Alpine	(China) David Cheng (Netherlands) Ho-Pin Tung (France) Nelson Panciatici	Alpine A460	D	234	Crash
DNF	LMP2	35	(China) Baxi DC Racing Alpine	(China) David Cheng (Netherlands) Ho-Pin Tung (France) Nelson Panciatici	Nissan VK45DE 4.5 L V8	D	234	Crash
DNF	LMP2	38	(Russia) G-Drive Racing	(United Kingdom) Simon Dolan (United Kingdom) Jake Dennis (Netherlands) Giedo van der Garde	Gibson 015S	D	222	Crash
DNF	LMP2	38	(Russia) G-Drive Racing	(United Kingdom) Simon Dolan (United Kingdom) Jake Dennis (Netherlands) Giedo van der Garde	Nissan VK45DE 4.5 L V8	D	222	Crash
DNF	LMGTE; Pro	64	(United States) Corvette Racing – GM	(United Kingdom) Oliver Gavin (United States) Tommy Milner (United States) Jordan Taylor	Chevrolet Corvette C7.R	M	219	Accident
DNF	LMGTE; Pro	64	(United States) Corvette Racing – GM	(United Kingdom) Oliver Gavin (United States) Tommy Milner (United States) Jordan Taylor	Chevrolet LT5.5 5.5 L V8	M	219	Accident
DNF	LMP1	4	(Austria) ByKolles Racing Team	(Switzerland) Simon Trummer (Germany) Pierre Kaffer (United Kingdom) Oliver Webb	CLM P1/01	D	206	Engine
DNF	LMP1	4	(Austria) ByKolles Racing Team	(Switzerland) Simon Trummer (Germany) Pierre Kaffer (United Kingdom) Oliver Webb	AER P60 2.4 L Turbo V6	D	206	Engine
DNF	LMP1	13	(Switzerland) Rebellion Racing	(Austria) Dominik Kraihamer (Switzerland) Alexandre Imperatori (Switzerland) Mathéo Tuscher	Rebellion R-One	D	200	Fuel injector
DNF	LMP1	13	(Switzerland) Rebellion Racing	(Austria) Dominik Kraihamer (Switzerland) Alexandre Imperatori (Switzerland) Mathéo Tuscher	AER P60 2.4 L Turbo V6	D	200	Fuel injector
DNF	LMGTE; Pro	51	(Italy) AF Corse	(Italy) Gianmaria Bruni (Italy) Alessandro Pier Guidi (United Kingdom) James Calado	Ferrari 488 GTE	M	179	Engine
DNF	LMGTE; Pro	51	(Italy) AF Corse	(Italy) Gianmaria Bruni (Italy) Alessandro Pier Guidi (United Kingdom) James Calado	Ferrari F154CB 3.9 L Turbo V8	M	179	Engine
DNF	LMGTE; Pro	71	(Italy) AF Corse	(Italy) Davide Rigon (Italy) Andrea Bertolini (United Kingdom) Sam Bird	Ferrari 488 GTE	M	143	Wheel
DNF	LMGTE; Pro	71	(Italy) AF Corse	(Italy) Davide Rigon (Italy) Andrea Bertolini (United Kingdom) Sam Bird	Ferrari F154CB 3.9 L Turbo V8	M	143	Wheel
DNF	LMGTE; Pro	92	(Germany) Porsche Motorsport	(France) Frédéric Makowiecki (Germany) Jörg Bergmeister (New Zealand) Earl Bamber	Porsche 911 RSR	M	140	Suspension
DNF	LMGTE; Pro	92	(Germany) Porsche Motorsport	(France) Frédéric Makowiecki (Germany) Jörg Bergmeister (New Zealand) Earl Bamber	Porsche 4.0 L Flat-6	M	140	Suspension
DNF	LMGTE; Pro	91	(Germany) Porsche Motorsport	(France) Patrick Pilet (France) Kévin Estre (United Kingdom) Nick Tandy	Porsche 911 RSR	M	135	Engine
DNF	LMGTE; Pro	91	(Germany) Porsche Motorsport	(France) Patrick Pilet (France) Kévin Estre (United Kingdom) Nick Tandy	Porsche 4.0 L Flat-6	M	135	Engine
DNF	LMP2	47	(Hong Kong) KCMG	(Japan) Tsugio Matsuda (United Kingdom) Richard Bradley (United Kingdom) Matthew Howson	Oreca 05	D	116	Electrical
DNF	LMP2	47	(Hong Kong) KCMG	(Japan) Tsugio Matsuda (United Kingdom) Richard Bradley (United Kingdom) Matthew Howson	Nissan VK45DE 4.5 L V8	D	116	Electrical
DNF	LMGTE; Am	89	(Germany) Proton Competition (Note: Cooper MacNeil was not allowed to drive the No. 89 Proton Porsche after becoming ill before the race. A last minute switch to reserve driver Gunnar Jeannette was denied by the ACO. The entry was allowed by the ACO to compete with only two drivers.)	(United States) Leh Keen (United States) Marc Miller	Porsche 911 RSR	M	50	Crash
DNF	LMGTE; Am	89	(Germany) Proton Competition	(United States) Leh Keen (United States) Marc Miller	Porsche 4.0 L Flat-6	M	50	Crash

Tyre manufacturers
Key
Symbol	Tyre manufacturer
D	Dunlop
M	Michelin

== Standings after the race ==
World Endurance Drivers' Championship standings
Pos.	+/–	Driver	Points
1		(Germany) Marc Lieb (France) Romain Dumas (Switzerland) Neel Jani	94
2	1	(France) Loïc Duval (Brazil) Lucas di Grassi (United Kingdom) Oliver Jarvis	55
3	2	(France) Stéphane Sarrazin (United Kingdom) Mike Conway (Japan) Kamui Kobayashi	54
4	4	(Germany) André Lotterer (France) Benoît Tréluyer (Switzerland) Marcel Fässler	35
5	3	(Austria) Dominik Kraihamer (Switzerland) Alexandre Imperatori (Switzerland) Mathéo Tuscher	30

World Endurance Manufacturers' Championship standings
Pos.	+/–	Constructor	Points
1		(Germany) Porsche	127
2	1	(Germany) Audi	95
3	1	(Japan) Toyota	79

== Footnotes ==
FIA World Endurance Championship
Previous race: 6 Hours of Spa-Francorchamps	2016 season	Next race: 6 Hours of Nürburgring
