= Addison Lee =

London private hire taxi company

Addison Lee Limited
- Addison Lee 2025 logo
- Type: Private
- Founded: 1975; 51 years ago in Battersea, London
- Founder: John Griffin
- Headquarters: London, W2; United Kingdom
- Area served: Greater London; Greater Manchester
- Key people: Liam Griffin, CEO
- Services: Minicab, Courier, Motorcycle taxi
- Revenue: £346 million (2017)
- Website: addisonlee.com

Addison Lee is a British private hire car and courier company headquartered in London, England. Founded in 1975 by John Griffin, the company has become the UK's largest premium private hire and courier service provider. In 2024, Addison Lee was acquired by ComfortDelGro, a multinational transport group based in Singapore.

Addison Lee serves a wide range of sectors, such as legal, financial, and media production industries. Its core offerings include private hire vehicles, black taxis, airport transfers, event transport solutions, and same-day courier deliveries, all of which can be booked via mobile app, website, or phone.

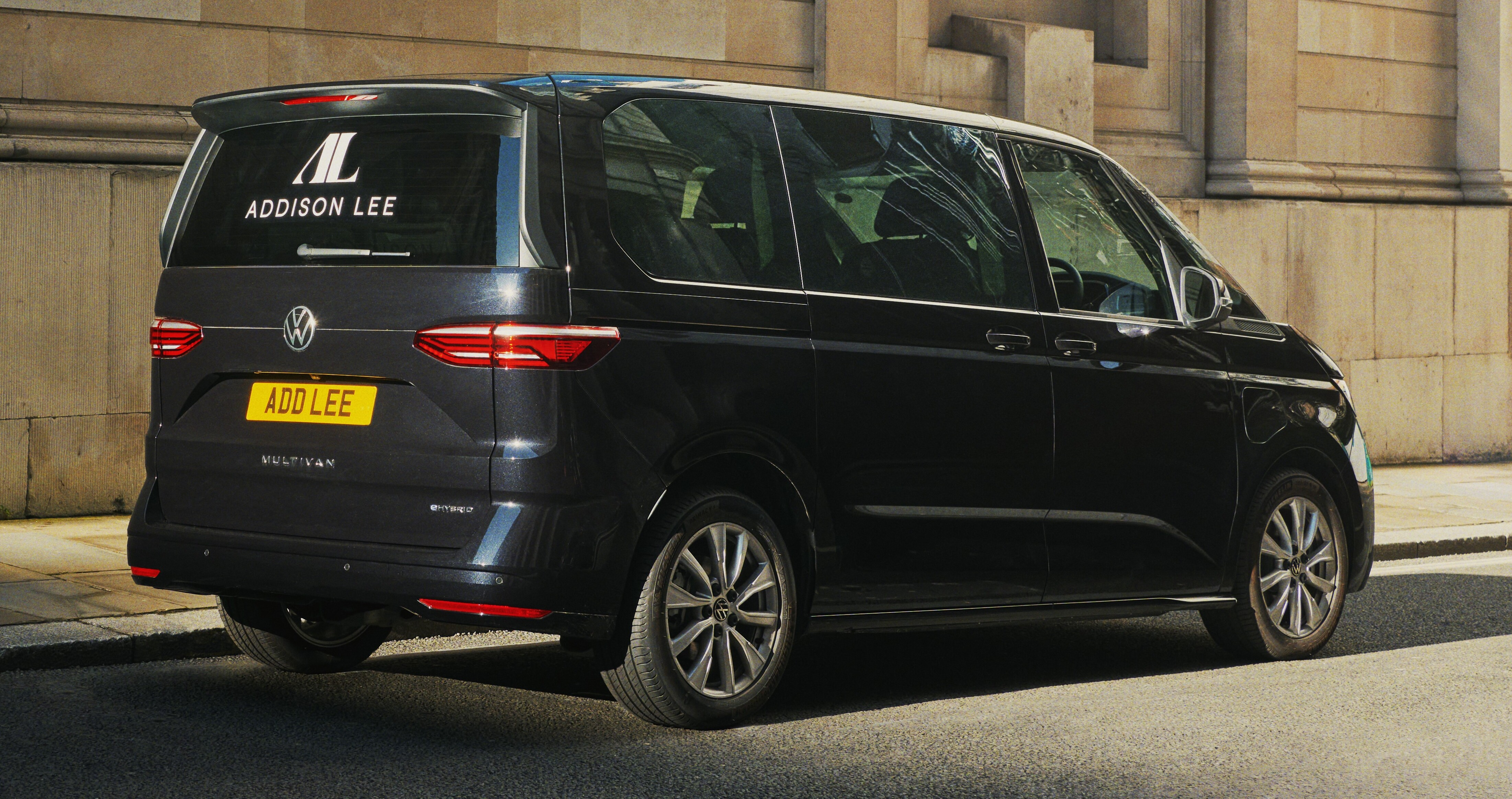
An Addison Lee VW Multivan with the latest branding

== History ==
The company was established in 1975 by John Griffin initially under the name Pacecroft Limited Griffin chose the name "Addison Lee" because he believed that a company name starting with "A" would increase visibility in telephone directory listings. The name "Addison" was suggested by a colleague who lived in Addison Gardens, a London area considered prestigious at the time. The company's ownership was initially split between Griffin and investor Lenny Foster.

In April 2013, The Carlyle Group, a private equity firm, purchased the company for an undisclosed sum. Liam Griffin replaced Daryl Foster as CEO. The Carlyle Group intended to grow the firm nationally and internationally. During 2014 Addison Lee announced that founder John Griffin had stepped down earlier that year and is no longer involved with the company.

In July 2017, they opened a customer care centre in Peterborough, Cambridgeshire.

In April 2020, the Carlyle Group sold Addison Lee back to Liam Griffin, who returned as CEO.

In October 2024, it was announced that ComfortDelGro, a multi-national transport group based in Singapore, acquired Addison Lee for £269.1m.

== Current Operations ==
As of 2024, Addison Lee operates a fleet of approximately 5,000 vehicles and generates annual revenues exceeding £500 million. The company completes more than 2 million individual rides and courier deliveries each year.

=== Acquisitions ===
In 2021, Addison Lee acquired black taxi operator ComCab London, making it the largest private hire and taxi company in London.

In 2023, Addison Lee acquired London-based private hire fleet operator Green Tomato Cars, an acquisition that followed their 2021 commitment to fully electric operations.

=== Technology ===
The company won the "Best Large Private Sector Fleet" award at the Energy Saving Trust Fleet Hero Awards 2011.

Addison Lee's software platform, developed in partnership with Haulmont Technology, has been used by JBW, an enforcement agency.

=== Accessibility ===
In October 2015, Addison Lee introduced CycleCab, a service allowing up to two passengers to travel in a cab with one bicycle.

== Controversies ==
In April 2012, Addison Lee's chairman John Griffin instructed all of its drivers to begin using bus lanes illegally. Griffin argued that allowing only licensed black taxis to use the lanes was "unfair discrimination". Griffin also secured a judicial review against Hackney Carriage legislation saying it was archaic.

John Griffin said the firm would "indemnify any fines or payments" that the firm's drivers would incur. In April 2012 the High Court ruled that Addison Lee could not encourage or instruct its drivers to use bus lanes.

In the April 2012 edition of Addison Lee's corporate magazine Add Lib, John Griffin used his editorial piece to voice his opinion that collisions with cyclists were unavoidable, and not the fault of his drivers. He concluded: "It is time for us to say to cyclists, ‘You want to join our gang, get trained and pay up’." This has caused a reaction from London's cycling community, including the London Cycling Campaign, CTC, Levenes Cycle and the London Fixed-Gear and Single-Speed forum, who have started taking action boycotting Addison Lee cabs by leaving negative reviews on the company's iPhone app, organising protests, and calling for people to lobby their companies to stop their Addison Lee accounts.

Dr. Belinda Web started an e-petition with HM Government to have Addison Lee's license withdrawn. This caused a reaction from London's cycling community, including the London Cycling Campaign.

On 26 April 2012, the Chief Procurement Officer confirmed that the UK Government (OP71) contract with Addison Lee would be terminated at the end of April 2012.

In 2015, following reports that a small number of Addison Lee drivers had kicked same-sex couples out of their cars, the company introduced a diploma for its drivers, which includes equality training.

In September 2017, Addison Lee lost a tribunal case brought by Leigh Day, which sought to grant employees rights such as the minimum wage and holiday pay.

== Former operations ==
Between July 2006 and April 2013, Addison Lee operated the Redwing Coaches business.
