= Andrew Scott (Canadian musician, born 1979) =

Canadian musician and songwriter

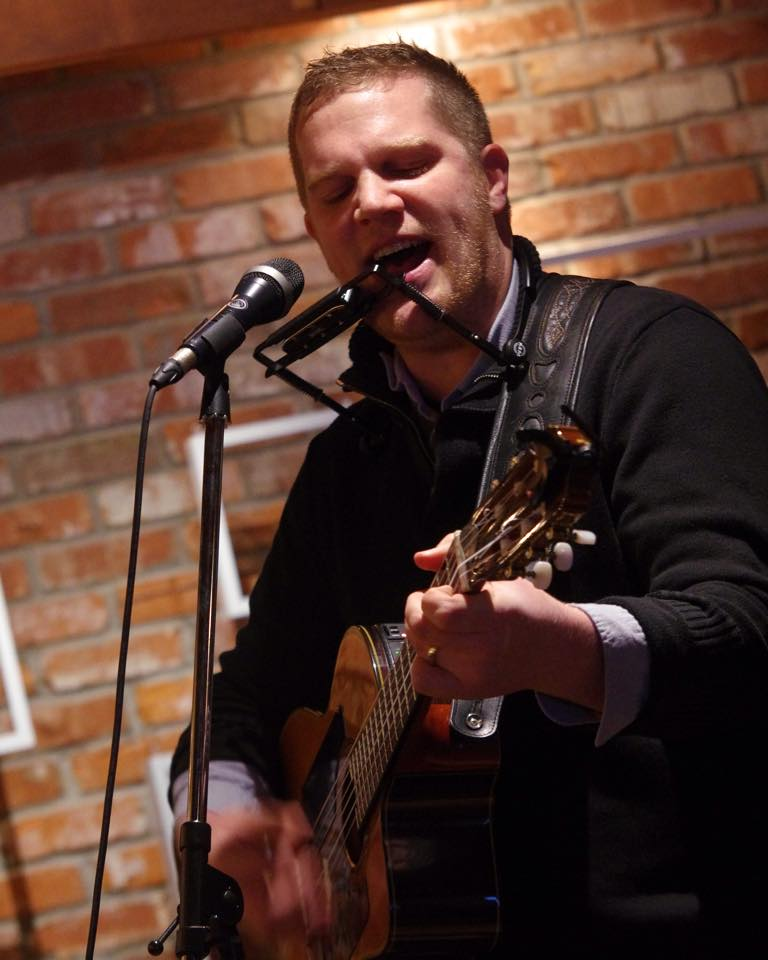
- Andrew Scott in concert, 2014.

Background information
- Born: Robert Andrew Scott; September 27, 1979 (age 46); Grande Prairie, Alberta, Canada
- Genres: Alternative country, alt folk, folk rock
- Years active: 2001 – Present
- Formerly of: The Turncoats
- Website: andrewscottsolo.ca

Robert Andrew Scott (born September 27, 1979) is a Canadian musician and songwriter, specializing in alternative country, alternative folk, and folk rock, with additional interests in folk music and blues. Scott was born and raised in Grande Prairie, Alberta, Canada. He is married to Julie Sauve Scott.

== Artistic style ==
While the instrumental portion of Scott's songs rely primarily on the acoustic guitar, Scott has drawn upon the talents of numerous musicians with a variety of sometimes unusual instruments (especially in relation to the genre of the song) to create a particular ambience through an innovative blend of instrumental sounds. Such instruments include the ukulele, violin, keyboard, concert flute, pianica (melodica), accordion, harmonica, kazoo, and the autoharp. In addition, Scott has incorporated various vocal styles in his work, and is particularly adept at yodeling.

Themes which are often heard in the lyrics of his songs include both the frustrating and gratifying aspects of everyday interpersonal and romantic relationships, often with a humorous bent. His more recent songs humorously lampoon aspects of life in Japan from the point of view of a foreign resident. His most popular original songs have been River of Tears, Sweetie Pie, and I'm Gonna Bust Your Head In. In live performances, Scott has also been known for his talented cover versions of many songs. His renditions of the songs Rawhide and We Do (also known as The Stonecutters' Song) in particular endeared him to members of his American audience. Scott is known among his fans for his gregarious stage presence, charismatic personality, and clarion voice, sometimes reminiscent of the late Frankie Laine.

== Musical career ==
Starting in 2002 Scott studied music at the University of Lethbridge. During his time there he joined The Turncoats, a popular local group, as guitarist and lead vocalist. With Scott as their frontman, The Turncoats recorded two CDs (Bloodrunnin and Teeth Like A Chainsaw) and played at venues and festivals throughout western Canada.

From 2007 until 2010, Scott and his wife Julie lived and worked in Aichi Prefecture, Japan, as English teachers in public schools. He continued to perform while in Japan, mostly at venues in the cities of Toyohashi and Nagoya, where Julie frequently accompanied on percussion. In May 2009, Scott released a CD entitled 13 Birds of Prey. Songs were recorded in both Canadian and Japanese studios, and featured the collaborative efforts of Japanese, Canadian, American, Australian, and Irish musical artists.

Scott and his wife returned to Lethbridge, Alberta in July 2010. Scott reunited with The Turncoats for a series of live performances in September 2010. Although The Turncoats have taken an indefinite hiatus, they occasionally re-unite whenever possible. Scott worked with Julie and Takuro Otani on the album My Time In The Empire, which was released on 24 May 2011. Scott has stated that songs in the next album have been inspired by his recent fatherhood experiences.

== Awards ==
- 2011: Global Country Star Search
- 2010: Top 10 category, "Gaijin Sounds Songwriting Contest" featured in Japanzine, for his song I'm Gonna Bust Your Head In.
- 2007: Second Place, Calgary Folk Music Festival Songwriting Contest, for his song River of Tears.
- 2006: "Best Performance", Calgary Folk Music Festival, with original song Artillery.
- 2001: First Place, Grande Prairie 97.7 Sun FM Songwriting Contest, for his song She Don't Want My Money.

== Discography ==
=== Andrew Scott ===
- My Time in the Empire, (2011)
- 13 Birds of Prey, (2009)
- Rattletale, (2003)

=== The Turncoats ===
- Teeth Like a Chainsaw, (2007)
- Bloodrunnin, (2004)

== See also ==
- Canadian rock
- List of Canadian musicians
- Music of Canada
