= Andy Scott (entrepreneur) =

British businessman

- Born: Andrew Pervis Scott; 13 January 1979 (age 47)
- Occupations: Businessman, entrepreneur
- Website: Official website

Andrew Pervis Scott (Andy Scott), born on 13 January 1979, is a British entrepreneur and businessman. His primary area of business revolves around leisure real estate, and he also holds ownership of multiple companies within the leisure, recruitment, and transport sectors. He is also an offshore and ocean sailor, having raced twice across the Atlantic Ocean and once across Pacific Ocean.

== Career ==
Scott grew up north of Portsmouth in Hampshire, UK, and received his education at St John's College, Southsea. He began his career at the age of 16 while working as a nightclub doorman. Scott initiated house renovations and managed construction sites after inheriting £5,000 from his grandmother, enabling him to purchase his first development property at the age of 18. He went on to develop more than 150 properties. By the age of 25, he had amassed his first million, personally owning seven hotels along the South Coast of England, with his first million-pound hotel acquisition occurring at the age of 22. Scott also held ownership of a group of café bars, selling them to Glendola Leisure and remaining on the board under a joint venture for two years. Andy Scott experienced a £6 million loss during the financial crash of 2008.

In 2008, Scott launched his investment company, Real Estate Leisure Capital Ltd (REL) with two subsidiaries Rel Hotels Ltd and Rel Pub Co Ltd. The REL Hotels purchased and sold the Gresham Court Hotel and the Palm Court Hotel in Bournemouth, UK. By 2009, it acquired Bournemouth's Woodcroft Hotel and Orchid Hotel, re-branding and developing Woodcroft Hotel through the exchanged contracts with multinational hospitality company Accor. The development included a £1 million extension and refurbishment. Around the same time, REL has exchanged on three pub sites in the area for residential development, and completed a £10 million mixed-use scheme with Travelodge in Kent and Essex.

Scott also owns bars groups, such as Number 1 Leicester Square in London's West End. Additionally, he held shareholdings and business interests in Europe, both personally and through REL. In 2017, he completed six company acquisitions and managed twelve turnaround and high-growth businesses.

Carinae IX 38-metre schooner

Scott's owns two superyachts, as well as Carinae IX, a 125-ft (38 m) schooner designed by Robert Harris and constructed in Canada in 2004. In 2019, he acquired the classic Sangermani yacht Telstar to prevent its potential destruction during a legal dispute in La Spezia. Subsequently, the vessel underwent a refit to serve the French and Italian Riviera for charter purposes.
