= Andrew Scott (economist) =

Economist, author and professor at the London Business School

Andrew J Scott CBE
- Born: Andrew John Scott; Enfield, United Kingdom
- Education: Trinity College Oxford
- Known for: Longevity Expertise
- Children: 3
- Scientific career
- Fields: Longevity and Ageing and Macroeconomic Trends
- Workplaces: London Business School; London School of Economics; Harvard University; University of Oxford; All Souls College, Oxford; Trinity College, Oxford; Centre for Economic Policy Research
- Website: profandrewjscott.com

Andrew John Scott CBE is a British economist, currently Professor of Economics at University of Oxford and Principal Scientist (Economics) at Ellison Institute of Technology-Oxford. He is known for his work on longevity and macroeconomics. Previously he was Professor of Economics at London Business School, a visiting professor at Harvard University and a researcher at the London School of Economics.

== Biography ==
Scott was born in 1965 in Enfield, London and was educated at Firs Farm Primary School and Haberdashers' Aske’s, Elstree. He attended Trinity College, Oxford where he graduated with a first with prizes in Politics, Philosophy and Economics in 1987. He received a MSc in economics from the London School of Economics in 1990 and was elected to a Prize Fellowship to All Souls College, Oxford in 1990. He was elected in the same year as philosopher Robert Rowland Smith and historian Scott Mandelbrote. He received his D.Phil (Essays in Aggregate Consumption) from Oxford in 1994.

He worked briefly as an economist for Credit Suisse First Boston before holding research positions at London Business School and the London School of Economics. He then took up a lectureship at Oxford University, a visiting assistant professor at Harvard before joining London Business School. The first half of his academic career focused on business cycles, monetary and fiscal policy and debt management but since the popular success of his book The 100 Year Life, his research has focused on the economics of longevity and ageing. In 2024, he published The Longevity Imperative, which outlines the importance of adjusting to longer life expectancy and the need to create a longevity society rather than an ageing society.

Alongside his academic career Scott has been a non-executive director for the UK’s Financial Services Authority and an advisor on monetary and fiscal policy to the House of Commons, the Bank of England, and H.M.Treasury and on ageing and longevity to a range of governments, departments and organisations. In 2026, he was awarded a CBE for his service to economics, research and public discourse.

== Selected publications ==
- Scott, Andrew J (2024) The Longevity Imperative: Building a Better Society for Healthier, Longer Lives, Basic Books 2024. ISBN 1-3998-0105-8
- The Economic Value of Targeting Aging (with David Sinclair, Martin Ellison), Nature Aging 2021
- The Longevity Society and The Longevity Economy, The Lancet Healthy Longevity 2021
- Government Debt Management: The Long AND the short of it (with Elisa Faraglia, Albert Marcet, Rigas Oikonomou), Review of Economic Studies 2019
- Gratton, Lynda & Scott, Andrew (2016) The 100-year life: living and working in an age of longevity, Bloomsbury 2016. ISBN 978-1-4729-3015-6
- Miles, David; Scott, Andrew; Breedon, Francis (9 April 2012). Macroeconomics: Understanding the Global Economy. Chichester: John Wiley & Sons. ISBN 978-1-119-99571-5.
- Debt and Deficit Fluctuations and the Structure of Bond Markets (with Albert Marcet) Journal of Economic Theory, 2009
- Consumer Confidence and Rational Expectations: Are Agents' Beliefs Consistent with the Theory? (with Daron Acemoglu) Economic Journal, January 1994, 104, 1-19
