= AmD Essex =

British car company and former racing team

- Founded: 1987 (as company); 1990 (as race team)
- Folded: 2020
- Base: West Thurrock, United Kingdom
- Team principal(s): Shaun Hollamby
- Former series: British Touring Car Championship; NASCAR Whelen Euro Series; Dunlop Sportmaxx Cup
- Noted drivers: (United Kingdom) Sam Osborne (United Kingdom) Jake Hill (United Kingdom) Rory Butcher (United Kingdom) Shaun Hollamby (United Kingdom) Nicolas Hamilton (United Kingdom) Tom Onslow-Cole (United Kingdom) Tom Boardman (United Kingdom) Ant Whorton-Eales (United Kingdom) Sam Tordoff (United Kingdom) Sam Smelt (United Kingdom) Ollie Jackson
- Teams' Championships: BTCC Independents Teams Champions: 2019
- Drivers' Championships: Dunlop Sportmaxx Cup: 2009: Simon Shaw; BTCC Independents Drivers title: 2019: Rory Butcher; BTCC Jack Sears Trophy: 2019: Rory Butcher
- Website: AmD Tuning Essex

AmD Technik Essex (also known as Automotive Developments) was a British car tuning company and auto racing team. The team last competed in the British Touring Car Championship under the MB Motorsport accelerated by Blue Square banner before merging with Motorbase Performance.

== History ==
The company was formed in 1987, specialising in the Volkswagen-Audi marque, forming their own VW-backed race team in 1990. They went on to win many championships with AmD-built and tuned Volkswagen Golfs. The company now offers tuning parts for most European cars.

For the 2008 & 2009 seasons, AmD ran SEAT Leóns in the Dunlop Sportmaxx Cup and won the championship in 2009, with Simon Shaw driving.

== BTCC ==
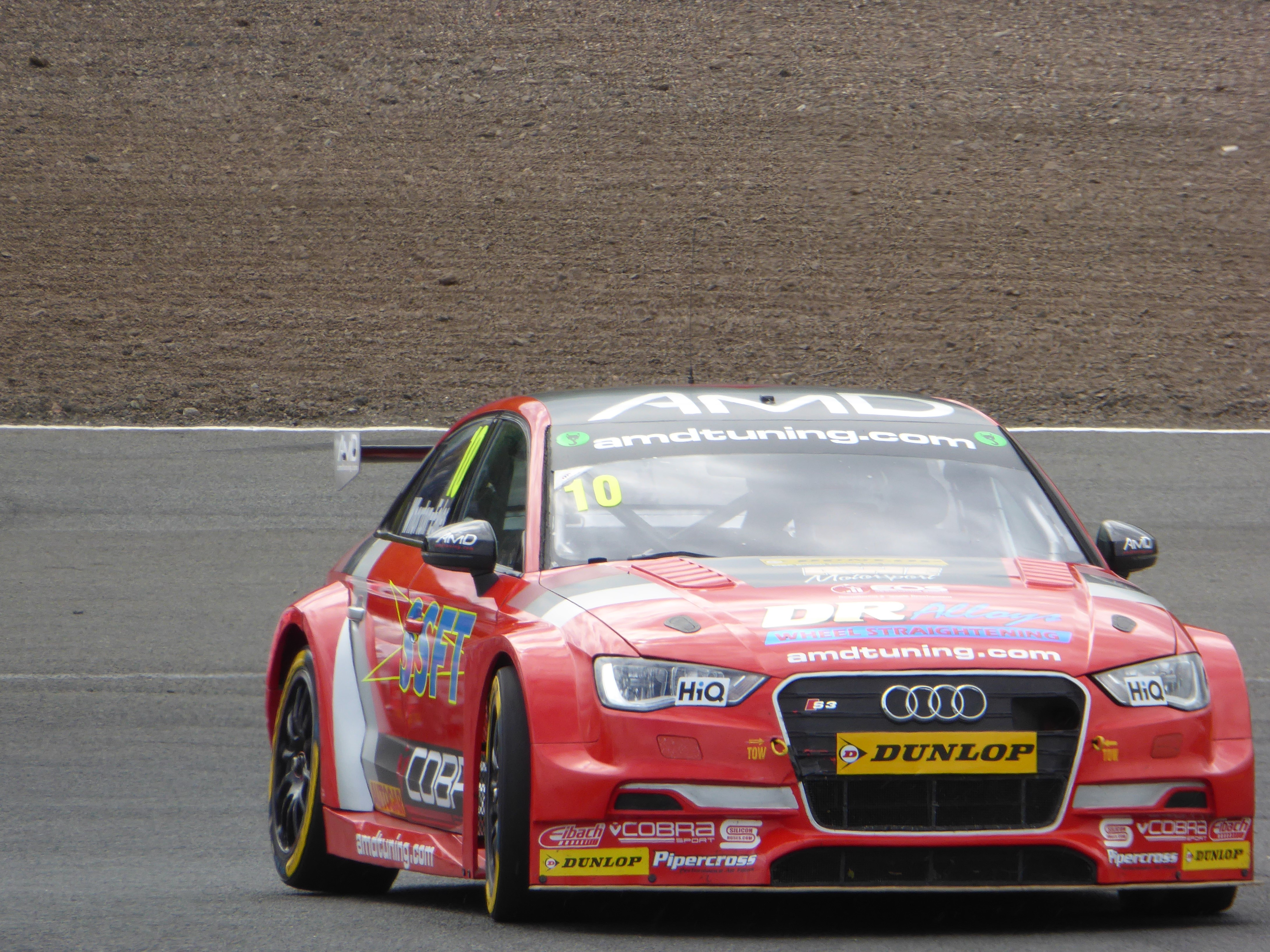
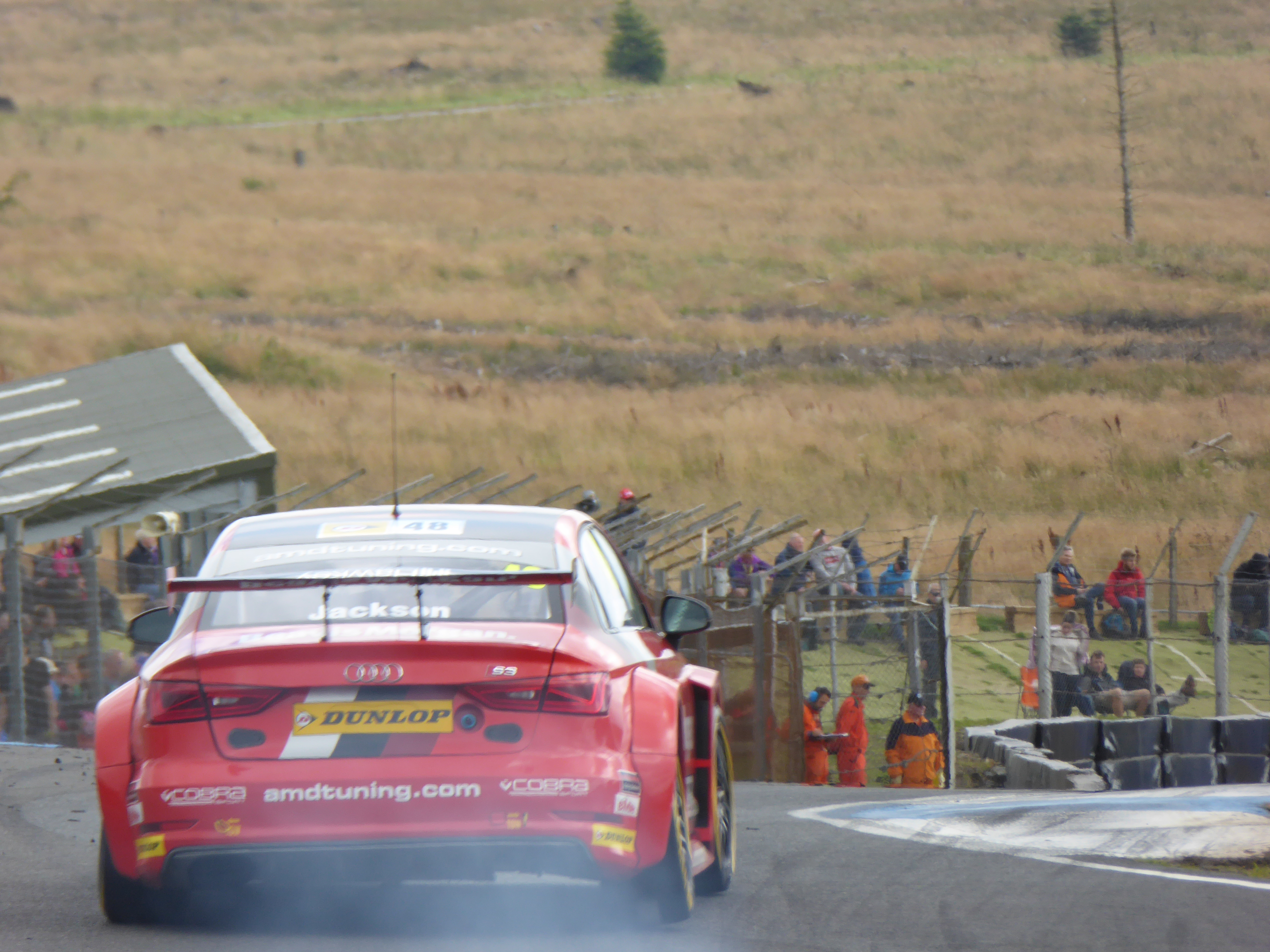
Ant Whorton-Eales (left) and Ollie Jackson (right), the team's drivers, at the Knockhill round of the 2017 British Touring Car Championship.

In 2010, AmD Essex, under the name AmD Milltek Racing, raced in the British Touring Car Championship running a Volkswagen Golf Mk5, driven by their managing director, Shaun Hollamby. The car was previously run in the Baltic Touring Car Championship.

The team remained in the series in 2011, with Tom Onslow-Cole campaigning the Golf for the first four rounds of the season, running with a Lehmann-built NGTC engine.

On Sunday 5 June, following Race 2 of round four at Oulton Park, Onslow-Cole announced he would be leaving the team following the final race of the day. Given the sudden circumstances, AmD Milltek took the decision not to field the car for the final round of the day. A day later, it emerged that Tom Onslow-Cole was to return to his previous team in Motorbase Performance Aon Ford, to run a third car. In the following week, it was announced that managing director Shaun Hollamby would pilot the car at round five at Croft, to give the team longer to find an appropriate replacement for Onslow-Cole. After Croft, Hollamby announced his retirement from high-level motorsport. For the remainder of the 2011 season, the team signed former Renault Clio Cup champion, Martin Byford to drive the car.

At the Autosport International show, AmD announced that Ollie Jackson would be driving for the team during the 2012 season.

In 2013, AmD ran James Kaye in a Honda Civic Type R (FK2) for round 1 of the BTCC season. The team then put Kaye in a Volkswagen Golf for the following rounds up to round 5. The car was then piloted by Shaun Hollamby on a one-off race in round 6 and Aaron Mason the round after. They sat out the Knockhill, Rockingham and Silverstone rounds of the championship, electing to focus on 2014.

Dave Newsham joined the team in 2014 and drove a Ford Focus ST for the season, picking up the team's first podium in race 3 at Newsham's home round at Knockhill and finished 17th in the championship.

For 2015, the team stuck with the Ford Focus ST with Mike Bushell piloting, and introduced the Audi S3 Saloon purchased from Rotek Racing to run brother of F1 champion Lewis Hamilton in Nicolas Hamilton for rounds 6 through 9 and Jake Hill at the final round at Brands Hatch.

Ollie Jackson returned to the squad in 2016 opting to run the Audi S3 Saloon after a single-entry of the car at the back end of 2015 and ditching the Ford Focus ST. Jackson completed the season in 26th place in the championship.

2017 saw AmD build a second Audi for Ant Whorton-Eales to partner the retained Ollie Jackson for the season with the two becoming regular points scorers on the way to 22nd and 23rd in the final standings.

AmD significantly expanded for the 2018 BTCC season with the acquisition of the MG6 cars left by the defunct Triple Eight Racing. To drive the two machines, the services of young Scotsman Rory Butcher who debuted in 2017 and previous BTCC race winner Tom Boardman were called upon. AmD split their team, as they also retained the two Audi S3 Saloon with Jackson remaining in one for the 3rd consecutive season and youngster Sam Smelt called up to the sister car. They recorded their best season to date with Butcher regularly troubling the top points scorers. Boardman was replaced half way through the season by Ant Whorton-Eales for Snetterton, Glynn Geddie for Rockingham and Knockhill and Josh Caygill for Silverstone and Brands Hatch. Ollie Jackson also took a 3rd place finish at Brands Hatch in changeable conditions.

For 2019, AmD sold the MG6s to new squad Excelr8 Motorsport and bought in the Honda Civic Type R (FK2) from Eurotech Racing, former team of 2013 champion Andrew Jordan, who left the series at the end of 2018. Rory Butcher was retained for one of the new Honda seats and race-winner Sam Tordoff was brought in to partner him. Tordoff was later replaced after 7 rounds by Mike Bushell. The three of them secured the Independent Teams Championship with a combined 4 wins and 3 pole positions whilst Butcher won both Independent Drivers title and the Jack Sears Trophy rounding off the team's most successful season to date and last as a standalone team.

=== TradePriceCars.com ===
Also in 2019, the Audi S3 Saloon was sold to Trade Price Racing but are still to be run for the team in a two-year deal by AmD, with Jake Hill taking one of the Audi seats and ex F1 driver, Le Mans & Indy Car race winner Mark Blundell taking the other. Jake took the Audis 1st ever victory at Knockhill.

Jake was promoted to the AmD side of the team for 2020 and will be partnered by Sam Osborne, whilst the Trade Price Cars arm will be piloted by Bobby Thompson and ex British GT Champion James Gornall.

=== MB Motorsport ===
For 2020, a partnership with ex-F1 racer Mark Blundell was formed, taking over the running of the Honda Civics. Mark Blundell will act as sporting director of the two-car Honda programme featuring new BRDC Superstar Jake Hill and Sam Osborne, with AmD founder Shaun Hollamby retaining the position of team principal. The team merged with Motorbase Performance for 2021.

=== BTCC results ===
British Touring Car Championship results
Year	Team name	Car	Drivers	Wins	Poles	Fast laps	Points	D.C.	T.C.	M.C.	I.D.C.	I.T.C.
2010	AmD Milltek Racing.com	Volkswagen Golf	(United Kingdom) Shaun Hollamby	0	0	0	0	28th	16th	N/A	22nd	13th
2011	AmD Milltek Racing.com	Volkswagen Golf	(United Kingdom) Tom Onslow-Cole †	0	0	0	61	13th	12th	N/A	7th	10th
2011	AmD Milltek Racing.com	Volkswagen Golf	(United Kingdom) Shaun Hollamby	0	0	0	0	29th	12th	N/A	24th	10th
2011	AmD Milltek Racing.com	Volkswagen Golf	(United Kingdom) Martin Byford	0	0	0	0	30th	12th	N/A	25th	10th
2012	AmD Tuning.com	Volkswagen Golf	(United Kingdom) Ollie Jackson	0	0	0	61	18th	13th	N/A	13th	11th
2013	AmD Tuning.com	Honda Civic	(United Kingdom) James Kaye	0	0	0	5	27th	18th	N/A	26th	15th
2013	AmD Tuning.com	Volkswagen Golf	(United Kingdom) James Kaye	0	0	0	5	27th	18th	N/A	26th	15th
2013	AmD Tuning.com	Volkswagen Golf	(United Kingdom) Shaun Hollamby	0	0	0	1	33rd	18th	N/A	29th	15th
2013	AmD Tuning.com	Volkswagen Golf	(United Kingdom) Aaron Mason	0	0	0	0	29th	18th	N/A	34th	15th
2014	AmD Tuning.com	Ford Focus ST	(United Kingdom) Dave Newsham	0	0	0	70	17th	10th	N/A	13th	8th
2015	AmD Tuning	Ford Focus ST	(United Kingdom) Mike Bushell	0	0	0	22	23rd	5th	N/A	15th	9th
2015	AmD Tuning	Audi S3 Saloon	(United Kingdom) Nicolas Hamilton	0	0	0	N/A	N/A	5th	N/A	N/A	9th
2015	AmD Tuning	Audi S3 Saloon	(United Kingdom) Jake Hill	0	0	0	0	35th	5th	N/A	28th	9th
2016	AmD Tuning	Audi S3 Saloon	(United Kingdom) Ollie Jackson	0	0	0	14	26th	16th	N/A	13th	10th
2017	AmD Tuning	Audi S3 Saloon	(United Kingdom) Ant Whorton-Eales	0	0	0	34	23rd	14th	N/A	12th	7th
2017	AmD Tuning	Audi S3 Saloon	(United Kingdom) Ollie Jackson	0	0	0	42	22nd	14th	N/A	9th	7th
2018	AmDTuning.com with Cobra Exhausts	Audi S3 Saloon	(United Kingdom) Sam Smelt	0	0	0	0	34th	17th	N/A	21st	13th
2018	AmDTuning.com with Cobra Exhausts	Audi S3 Saloon	(United Kingdom) Ollie Jackson	0	0	0	59	23rd	17th	N/A	15th	13th
2018	AmDTuning.com with AutoAid/RCIB Insurance Racing	MG6 GT	(United Kingdom) Rory Butcher	0	0	0	99	17th	12th	N/A	10th	7th
2018	AmDTuning.com with AutoAid/RCIB Insurance Racing	MG6 GT	(United Kingdom) Ant Whorton-Eales	0	0	0	6	30th	12th	N/A	23rd	7th
2018	AmDTuning.com with AutoAid/RCIB Insurance Racing	MG6 GT	(United Kingdom) Tom Boardman	0	0	0	4	29th	12th	N/A	20th	7th
2018	AmDTuning.com with AutoAid/RCIB Insurance Racing	MG6 GT	(United Kingdom) Glynn Geddie	0	0	0	1	33rd	12th	N/A	25th	7th
2018	AmDTuning.com with AutoAid/RCIB Insurance Racing	MG6 GT	(United Kingdom) Josh Caygill	0	0	0	0	40th	12th	N/A	29th	7th
2019	Cobra Sport AmD with AutoAid/RCIB Insurance Racing	Honda Civic Type R (FK2)	(United Kingdom) Rory Butcher	3	1	3	266	5th	3rd	N/A	1st	1st
2019	Cobra Sport AmD with AutoAid/RCIB Insurance Racing	Honda Civic Type R (FK2)	(United Kingdom) Sam Tordoff	1	2	0	147	13th	3rd	N/A	6th	1st
2019	Cobra Sport AmD with AutoAid/RCIB Insurance Racing	Honda Civic Type R (FK2)	(United Kingdom) Mike Bushell	0	0	1	27	24th	3rd	N/A	17th	1st
2019	TradePriceCars.com	Audi S3 Saloon	(United Kingdom) Jake Hill	1	0	0	131	15th	11th	N/A	4th	4th
2019	TradePriceCars.com	Audi S3 Saloon	(United Kingdom) Mark Blundell	0	0	0	5	27th	11th	N/A	18th	4th
Year	Team name	Car	Drivers	Wins	Poles	Fast laps	Points	D.C.	T.C.	M.C.	I.D.C.	I.T.C.

Notes
* Season still in progress
† Swapped teams mid season
