= Aaron Mason =

British racing driver (born 1979)

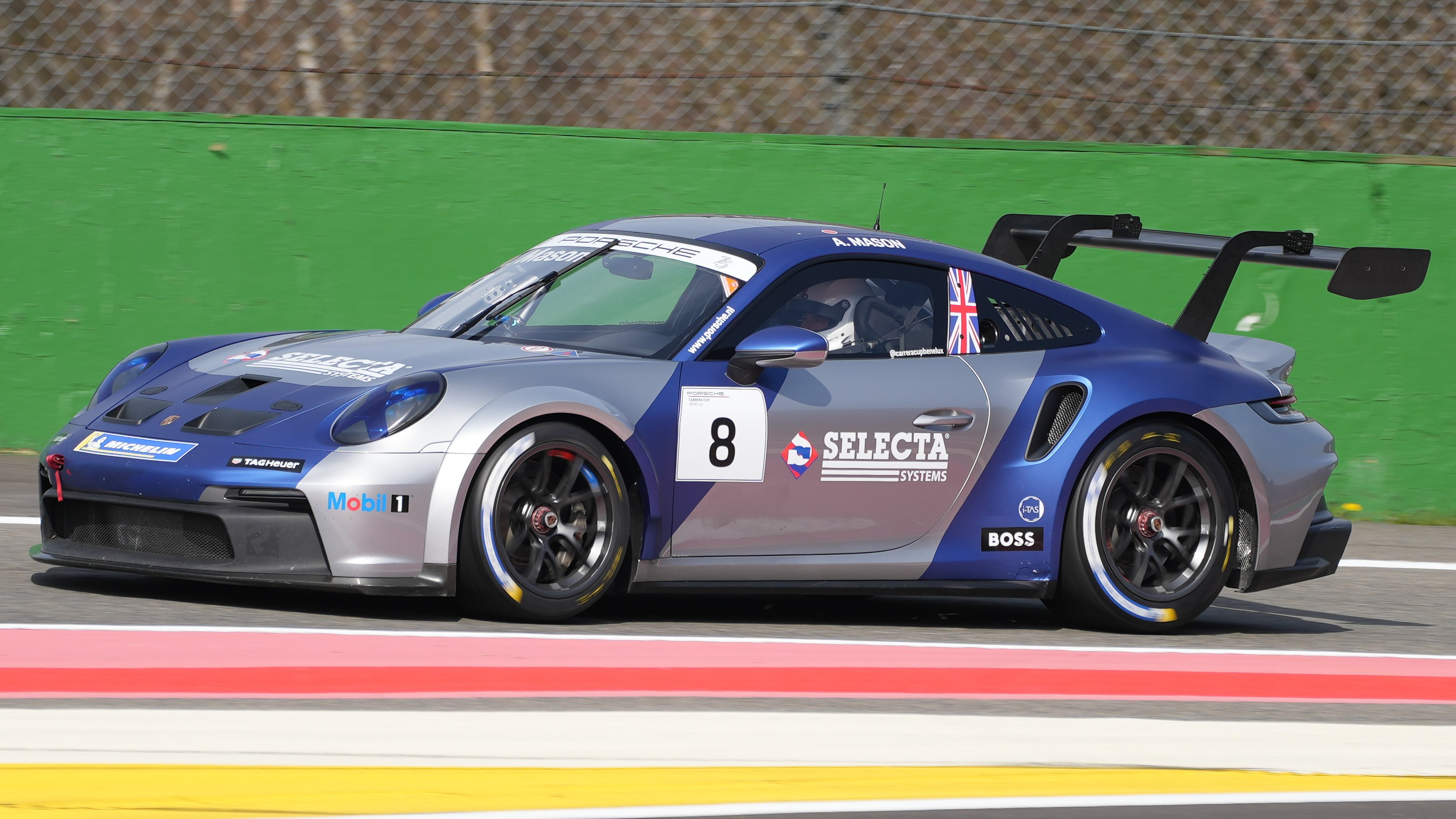
- Mason driving at Circuit de Spa-Francorchamps in 2023.
- Nationality: (United Kingdom) British
- Born: 20 September 1979 (age 47) Doncaster, United Kingdom

Porsche Supercup career
- Debut season: 2021
- Current team: Martinet by Alméras
- Car number: 15
- Starts: 23
- Wins: 0
- Poles: 0
- Fastest laps: 0
- Best finish: 22nd in 2025
- Finished last season: 22nd

Previous series
- 2021 2019-2020 2016 2009-2011, 2013-2015 2013: Porsche Carrera Cup Germany; Porsche Carrera Cup GB; British GT; VW Racing Cup GB; BTCC

Championship titles
- 2013, 2015: Volkswagen Racing Cup GB

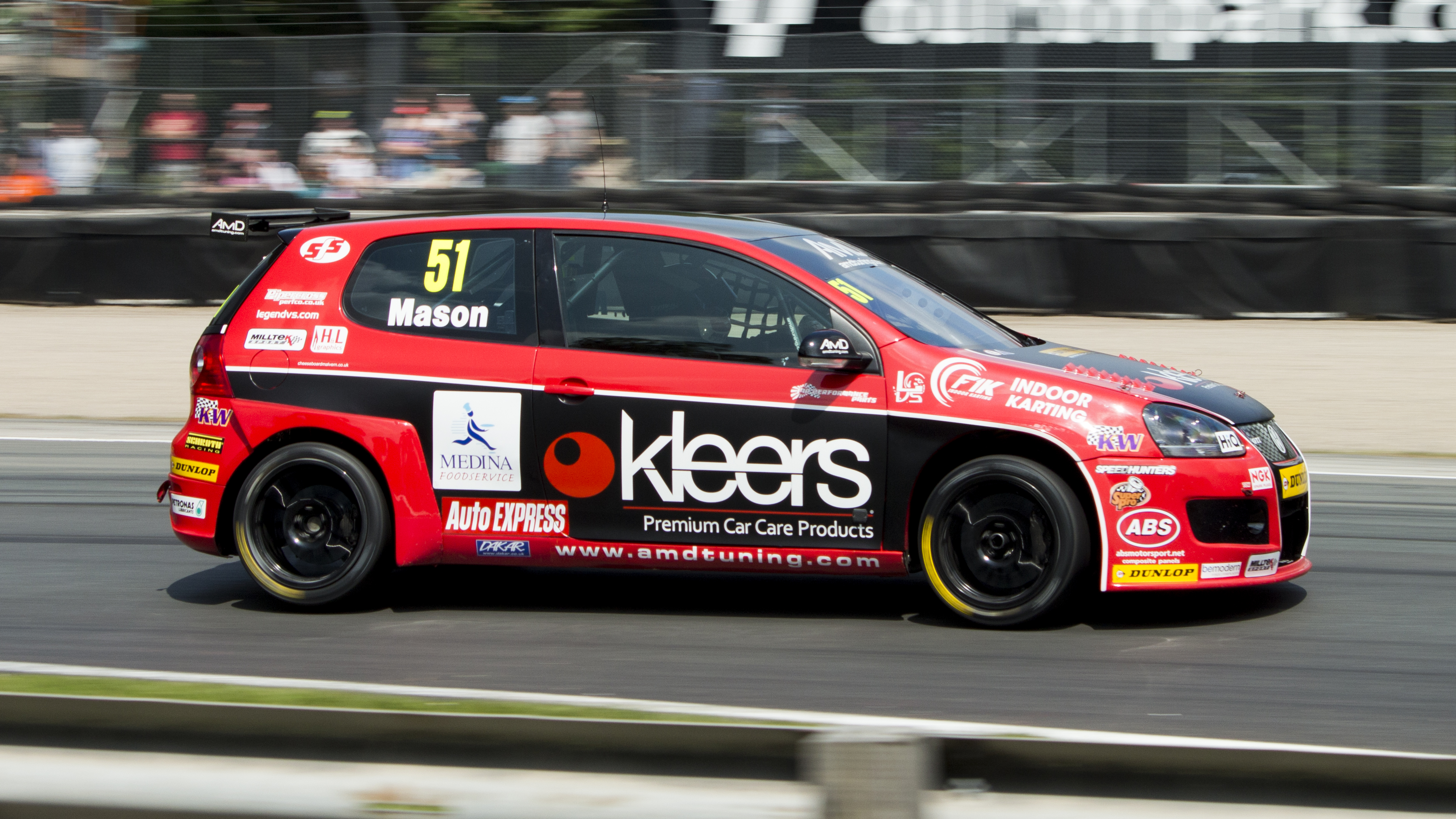
Mason driving the AmD Tuning Volkswagen Golf at Oulton Park during the 2013 British Touring Car Championship season.

Aaron Mason (born 20 September 1979) is a British racing driver who last competed in the Porsche Supercup with Martinet by Alméras. He is a two-time champion of the Volkswagen Racing Cup GB. He made his British Touring Car Championship debut in 2013, replacing James Kaye at AmDTuning.com for the Oulton Park round.

== Career ==
In 2009, Mason, born in Doncaster, Yorkshire, entered the Volkswagen Racing Cup Great Britain, driving a Volkswagen Golf GTI Mk V for AWM Motorsport; he finished on the podium once out of his 13 races, and was classified third in the championship. He remained in the series for 2010, but slipped to fifth place, despite winning three races, and taking a further podium. He remained in the series for 2011 and 2012, finishing third both years, with four victories.

Mason entered the series again in 2013, driving a Volkswagen Scirocco R, and took four victories early in the season; his total tally of 15 made him the most successful driver in the history of the series. In June 2013, it was announced that Mason would be driving for AmDTuning.com in the Oulton Park round of the British Touring Car Championship, as regular driver James Kaye had business commitments that prevented him from competing in the event. He took third place in the Jack Sears Trophy in the first race (21st overall), but overrevved the engine in the second, and was unable to race in the final round of the day. Shaun Hollamby, the team boss of AmDTuning.com, praised his performance, stating "He did a brilliant job when you consider he was thrown in at the deep end and there was a lot for him to get used to in a short amount of time." Following the race, he returned to the VW Racing Cup, and took the title in the final round, with his fifth victory of the season.

== Racing record ==
=== Complete British Touring Car Championship results ===
(key) (Races in bold indicate pole position – 1 point awarded just in first race) (Races in italics indicate fastest lap – 1 point awarded all races) (* signifies that driver lead race for at least one lap – 1 point given all races)

Year	Team	Car	1	2	3	4	5	6	7	8	9	10	11	12	13	14	15	16	17	18	19	20	21	22	23	24	25	26	27	28	29	30	Pos	Pts
2013	AmD Tuning.com	Volkswagen Golf GTI	BRH; 1	BRH; 2	BRH; 3	DON; 1	DON; 2	DON; 3	THR; 1	THR; 2	THR; 3	OUL; 1; 21	OUL; 2 Ret	OUL; 3 DNS	CRO; 1	CRO; 2	CRO; 3	SNE; 1	SNE; 2	SNE; 3	KNO; 1	KNO; 2	KNO; 3	ROC; 1	ROC; 2	ROC; 3	SIL; 1	SIL; 2	SIL; 3	BRH; 1	BRH; 2	BRH; 3	39th	0

=== Complete British GT Championship results ===
(key) (Races in bold indicate pole position) (Races in italics indicate fastest lap)

Year	Team	Car	Class	1	2	3	4	5	6	7	8	9	DC	Points
2016	RCIB Insurance Racing	Ginetta G55 GT4	GT4	BRH; 1	ROC; 1	OUL; 1; 22	OUL; 2; 15	SIL; 1; 11	SPA; 1; 19	SNE; 1; 19	SNE; 2 Ret	DON; 1; 15	9th	81.5

=== Complete Porsche Supercup results ===
(key) (Races in bold indicate pole position) (Races in italics indicate fastest lap)

Year	Team	1	2	3	4	5	6	7	8	Pos.	Points
2021	Pierre martinet by Alméras	MON; Ret	RBR; 23	RBR; 20	HUN; 22	SPA; 26	ZND; 26	MNZ; 24	MNZ; 24	24th	0
2022	Martinet by Alméras	IMO; 31	MON; DNQ	SIL; 24	RBR; 26	LEC; Ret	SPA; 21	ZND; 22	MNZ; 24	27th	0
2025	Martinet by Alméras	IMO; 20	MON; 15‡	CAT; 26	RBR; 26	SPA; 21	HUN; 18	ZND; 21	MNZ; 21	22nd	4

^{‡} Half points awarded as less than 75% of race distance was completed.
