= Shaun Hollamby =

British TV Director/Producer and former racing driver (born 1965)

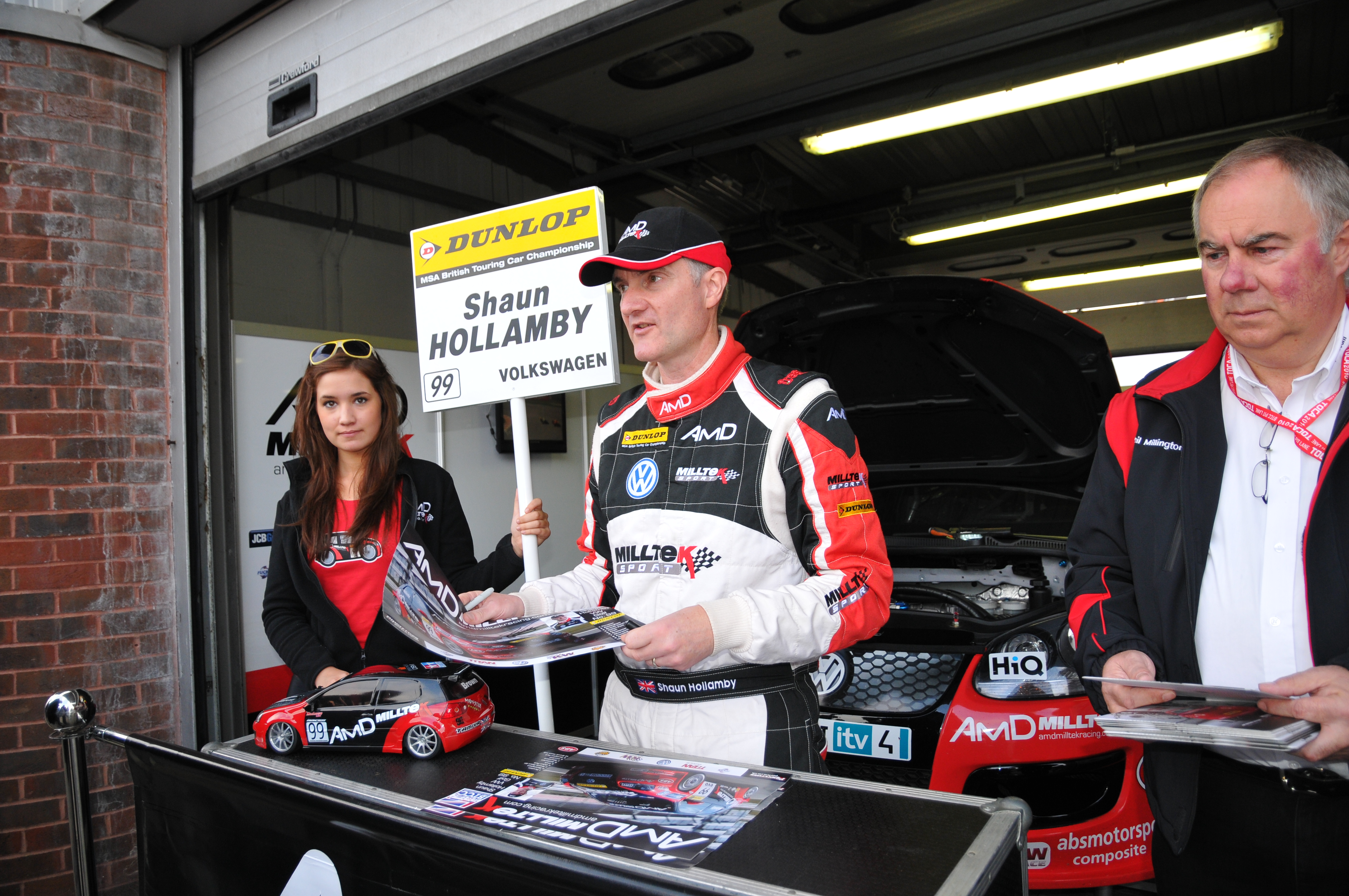
- Hollamby at Brands Hatch during the 2010 British Touring Car Championship season
- Nationality: British
- Born: 4 December 1965 (age 60) Pembury, Kent, England

NASCAR Whelen Euro Series career
- Debut season: 2019
- Current team: DF1 Racing
- Car number: 77
- Former teams: Marko Stipp Motorsport AmD Tuning
- Starts: 8
- Wins: 0
- Poles: 0
- Fastest laps: 0

Previous series
- 2016-17 2010–11, 13 2008 2007–2009 2003–05 1990 1989 1987–88 1986: Britcar; BTCC; Dunlop Sport Maxx Cup; European Time Attack; VW Cup; Formula Forward; Multisports; Formula First; Formula Vee

Championship titles
- 1989, 2013: Wurth Multisports, Battle of the Pros

Scott Hollamby, also known as Shaun Hollamby, (born 4 December 1965 in Pembury, Kent) is a British TV Director/Producer and former racing driver and race team owner. He was the managing director of AmD Tuning, a performance tuning company and motor racing team based in West Thurrock, Essex. He also previously competed in a part-time effort in the NASCAR Whelen Euro Series and Historic F3 and FFord.

In 2010–2013, Hollamby ran and drove a Volkswagen Golf in the British Touring Car Championship (BTCC) with various drivers for his own team AmD Tuning.

AmD then switched to a Ford Focus in the BTCC in 2014–2015, with Dave Newsham and Mike Bushell; and also an Audi S3 for Nicolas Hamilton in 2015.

The following year AmD ran Ollie Jackson in the Audi and Ant Whorton-Eales joined for 2017 in a second Audi. The 2018 season saw an expansion to also run two MGs alongside the Audis, with Sam Smelt joining Ollie Jackson in the Audis and Rory Butcher and Tom Boardman driving the MGs.

The team ran Sam Tordoff and Rory Butcher in Honda FK2 Civic Type Rs; and Jake Hill and Mark Blundell in the Audi S3s. The team also ran Jake Hill and Sam Osborne in the Hondas in 2020 and Bobby Thompson and James Gornall in the Audis under the Trade Price Cars banner.

Hollamby completed a buyout/merger with Motorbase BTCC team for the 2021 season, but the agreement for Hollamby to continue as Team Principal and joint owner was changed, so he chose to step down from a full time role in the BTCC. Hollamby continued to work within the paddock as the presenter for the Pitch BTCC TV programme on the SKY channel; the channel SportyStuff TV; and as a commentator on the Porsche Supercup world feed.

Hollamby is now TV Producer/Director for F2/F3/F1 Academy/F1 Kids/Porsche Supercup, working full time for Formula One Management Ltd.

== Motorsport history ==
- 1978–85, Karting
- 1986, Formula Vee
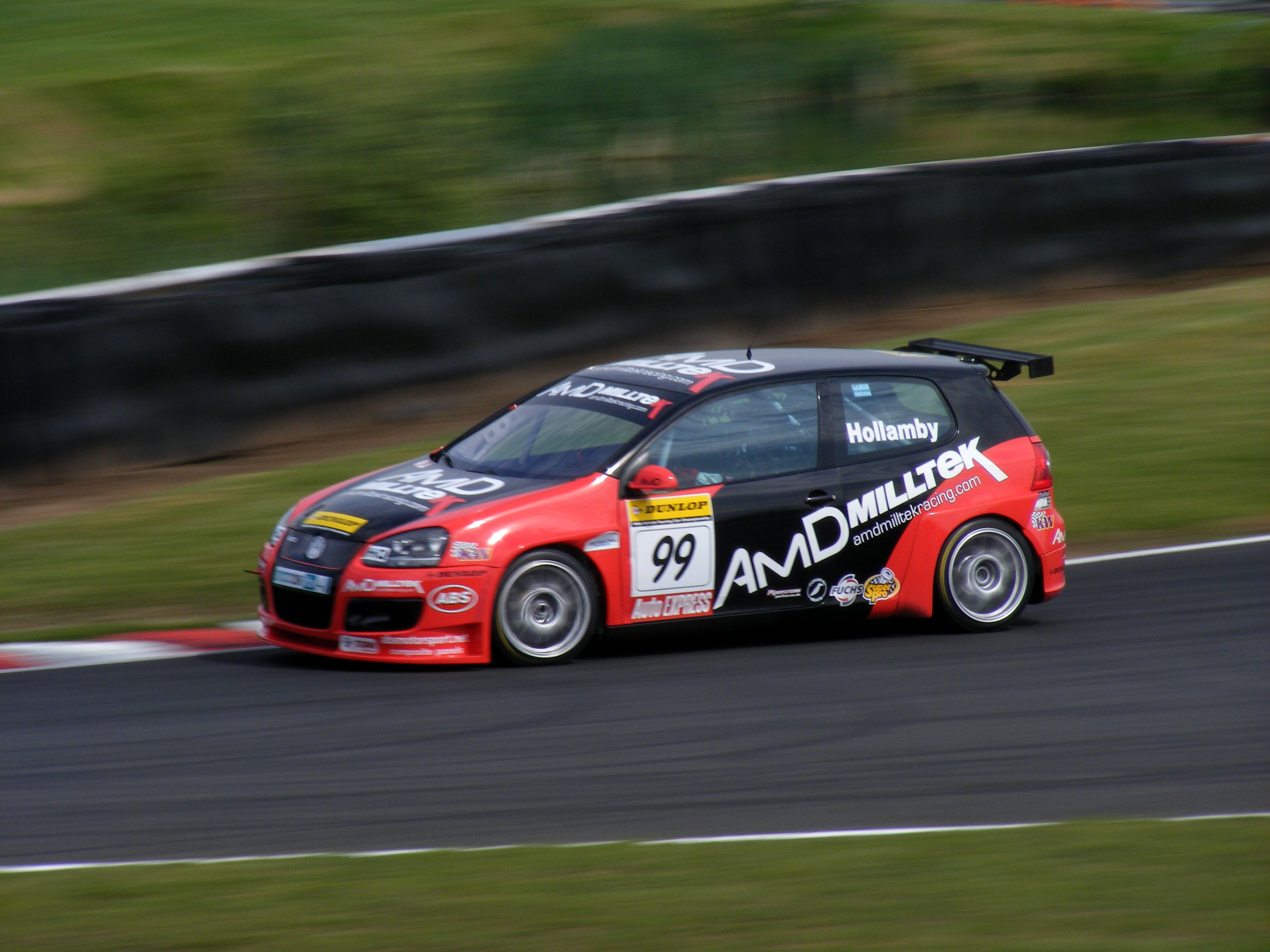
- Shaun Hollamby at Oulton Park during the 2010 British Touring Car Championship season
  1987–88, Formula First
- 1989, Multisport
- 1990, Formula Forward
- 1997–present, TV Director/Producer for Formula One Management (FOM)
- 2003–2005, Volkswagen Racing Cup
- 2008, Dunlop Sportmaxx Cup
- 2008–2010, European Time Attack
- 2010–2011, 2013 British Touring Car Championship (BTCC)
- 2015, British GT
- 2016, Britcar
- 2017, VW Cup and Britcar
- 2019-2020, NASCAR Whelen Euro Series
- 2021 Historic F3 and FFord

== Personal life ==
Hollamby currently lives in London and has two daughters, Josie, Lottie and grandson, Brodie. He is married to Angie and has three step children Jamie, Max and Tara. Shaun's father, Olly, was a successful racing driver, winning the 1977 and 1979 SuperVee Championships.

== Racing record ==
=== Complete British Touring Car Championship results ===
(key) (Races in bold indicate pole position – 1 point awarded just in first race) (Races in italics indicate fastest lap – 1 point awarded all races) (* signifies that driver lead race for at least one lap – 1 point awarded all races)

Year	Team	Car	1	2	3	4	5	6	7	8	9	10	11	12	13	14	15	16	17	18	19	20	21	22	23	24	25	26	27	28	29	30	DC	Pts
2010	AmD Milltek Essex.com	Volkswagen Golf	THR; 1 Ret	THR; 2; 18	THR; 3 Ret	ROC; 1; 14	ROC; 2 Ret	ROC; 3; 14	BRH; 1 Ret	BRH; 2 Ret	BRH; 3 DNS	OUL; 1 NC	OUL; 2 Ret	OUL; 3 Ret	CRO; 1 Ret	CRO; 2; 16	CRO; 3; 14	SNE; 1; 16	SNE; 2; 15	SNE; 3; 15	SIL; 1 DNS	SIL; 2 DNS	SIL; 3 DNS	KNO; 1; 13	KNO; 2; 16	KNO; 3; 15	DON; 1; 15	DON; 2; 19	DON; 3 Ret	BRH; 1; 21	BRH; 2; 17	BRH; 3 Ret	28th	0
2011	AmD Milltek Racing.com	Volkswagen Golf	BRH; 1	BRH; 2	BRH; 3	DON; 1	DON; 2	DON; 3	THR; 1	THR; 2	THR; 3	OUL; 1	OUL; 2	OUL; 3	CRO; 1; 17	CRO; 2; 13	CRO; 3; 15	SNE; 1	SNE; 2	SNE; 3	KNO; 1	KNO; 2	KNO; 3	ROC; 1	ROC; 2	ROC; 3	BRH; 1	BRH; 2	BRH; 3	SIL; 1	SIL; 2	SIL; 3	29th	0
2013	AmD Tuning.com	Volkswagen Golf	BRH; 1	BRH; 2	BRH; 3	DON; 1	DON; 2	DON; 3	THR; 1	THR; 2	THR; 3	OUL; 1	OUL; 2	OUL; 3	CRO; 1	CRO; 2	CRO; 3	SNE; 1	SNE; 2	SNE; 3	KNO; 1	KNO; 2	KNO; 3	ROC; 1	ROC; 2	ROC; 3	SIL; 1	SIL; 2	SIL; 3	BRH; 1; 15	BRH; 2; 17	BRH; 3; 23	33rd	1

=== Complete British GT Championship results ===
(key) (Races in bold indicate pole position) (Races in italics indicate fastest lap)

Year	Team	Car	Class	1	2	3	4	5	6	7	8	9	DC	Points
2015	AmDtuning.com	Porsche 997 GT4	GT4	OUL; 1; 14	OUL; 2 Ret	ROC; 1	SIL; 1	SPA; 1	BRH; 1	SNE; 1; 26	SNE; 2; 25	DON; 1	23rd	12

=== Complete NASCAR results ===
==== Whelen Euro Series – EuroNASCAR 2 ====
(key) (Bold – Pole position. Italics – Fastest lap. * – Most laps led. ^ – Most positions gained)

NASCAR Whelen Euro Series – EuroNASCAR 2 results
Year	Team	No.	Make	1	2	3	4	5	6	7	8	9	10	11	12	13	NWES	Pts
2019	Racing-Total AmD Tuning	46	Ford	VAL; 18	VAL; 18	FRA; 16	FRA; 21										29th	99
2019	Marko Stipp Motorsport AmD Tuning	46	Ford					BRH; 25	BRH; 26	MOS	MOS	VEN	HOC	HOC	ZOL	ZOL	29th	99
2021	DF1 Racing	77	Chevy	ESP	ESP	GBR; 15^	GBR; 6	CZE	CZE	CRO	CRO	BEL	BEL	ITA	ITA		27th	57
