= Nicolas Hamilton =

British racing driver (born 1992)

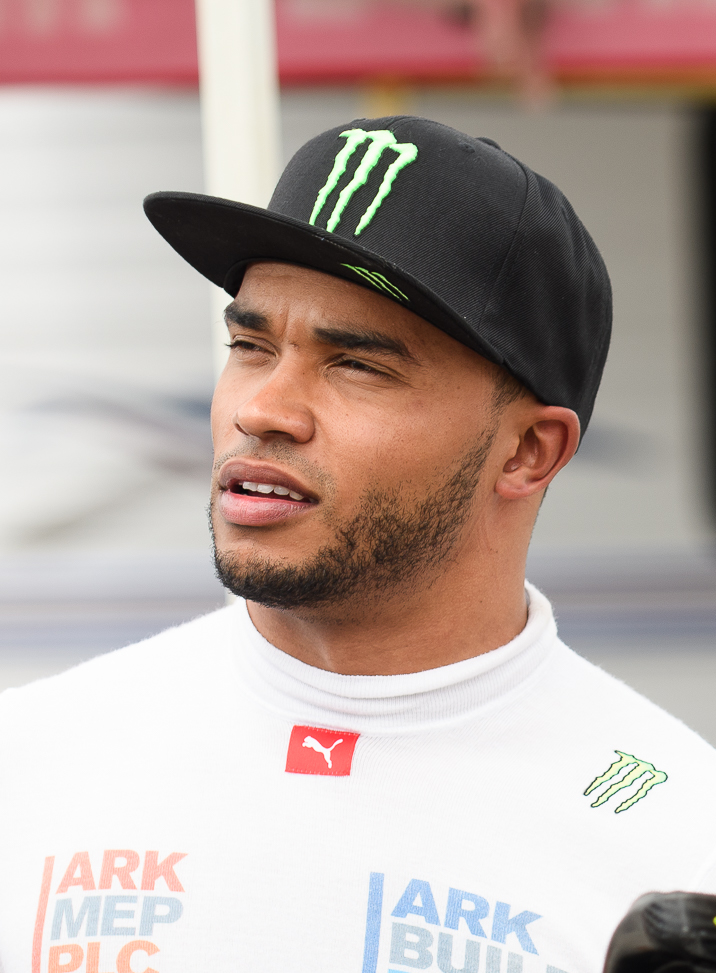
- Hamilton at the 2017 World RX of Canada
- Nationality: (United Kingdom) British
- Born: Nicolas Carl Hamilton; 28 March 1992 (age 34) Stevenage, Hertfordshire, England
- Relatives: Lewis Hamilton (half-brother)

British Touring Car Championship career
- Debut season: 2015
- Current team: Team VERTU
- Car number: 28
- Former teams: ROKiT Racing with Motorbase, AmD Tuning, Tony Gilham Racing, Powder Monkey Brewing Co with Esidock
- Starts: 190 (193 entries)
- Wins: 0
- Poles: 0
- Fastest laps: 0
- Best finish: 23rd in 2026

Previous series
- 2011–12 2013: Renault Clio Cup UK; European Touring Car Cup

Awards
- 2026 2026: Jack Sears Trophy; Goodyear Wingfoot Award

Nicolas Carl Hamilton (born 28 March 1992) is a British racing driver who competes in the British Touring Car Championship for Team VERTU. He races with a specially-modified car due to his cerebral palsy.

Hamilton is the paternal half-brother of seven-time Formula One World Champion Lewis Hamilton.

== Racing career ==
=== Renault Clio Cup United Kingdom ===
Hamilton made his racing debut in the Renault Clio Cup United Kingdom in 2011 driving for Total Control Racing. He attracted much fan and media attention despite finishing last in his first race. His first season was the subject of a BBC documentary entitled Racing with the Hamiltons: Nic in the Driving Seat. He finished the season in 14th with 133 points. In the same year, he drove in the ERDF Masters Kart series.

For 2012, Hamilton retained his seat at Total Control Racing in the Renault Clio Cup UK. He finished the season in 21st with 51 points.

=== European Touring Car Cup ===
Hamilton moved up to the European Touring Car Cup for 2013, driving a SEAT León Supercopa for Baporo Motorsport. He finished tenth in the standings with 12 points.

=== British Touring Car Championship ===
In 2015, Hamilton secured a deal with AmD Tuning to race an Audi S3 in five rounds of the British Touring Car Championship, becoming the first disabled driver to compete in the series.

For 2017, Hamilton secured a seat in the Renault UK Clio Cup, driving for WDE Motorsport. Hamilton partnered three-time champion Paul Rivett and Lee Pattison. He finished 20th in the standings with 44 points.

In 2018, Hamilton maintained his seat with WDE Motorsport, which had been rebranded to JET with WDE Motorsport. He finished 20th in the standings with 20 points.

In 2019, Hamilton secured a full-time drive with Motorbase Performance in the BTCC along with Tom Chilton and Ollie Jackson.

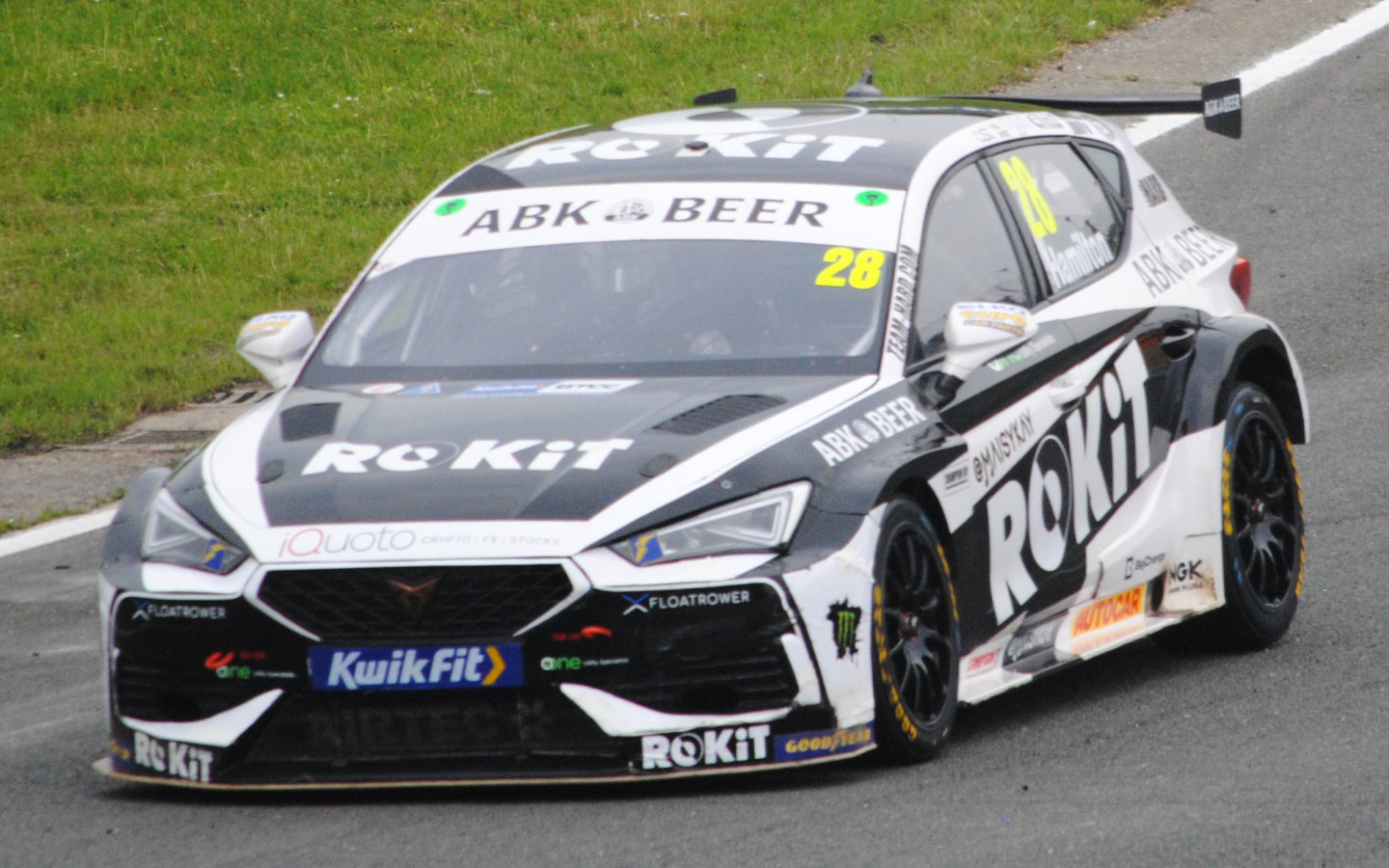
Hamilton driving the Cupra León at Brands Hatch.

On 21 February 2020, Hamilton was confirmed as the fourth Team HARD driver in a Volkswagen CC, retaining his ROKiT sponsorship. In the final race at Brands Hatch, in round 2 of the championship, Hamilton scored his first-ever BTCC point after finishing the race in 15th place.

In 2021, Hamilton kept his seat with ROKiT Racing, this time under the name ROKiT Racing with iQuoto Online Trading. He ended the season 30th in the championship with no points.

For 2022, Hamilton signed with Yazoo with Safuu.com Racing, driving a Cupra Leon. He competed in the most races per season of his BTCC career and still increased his average finishing position by a grid spot. He took 29th in the championship overall.

On 6 April 2023, Hamilton was confirmed to have kept his seat at Yazoo with Safuu.com Racing, which rebranded to become Go-Fix with Autoaid Breakdown. It would become his most successful season in the BTCC to date, finishing sixth in race 2 of the opening round at Donington Park. In mid-2023, he withdrew from the season after his team collapsed, and was therefore left without a seat for the 2024 season. He ended the season 24th in the championship with 10 points.

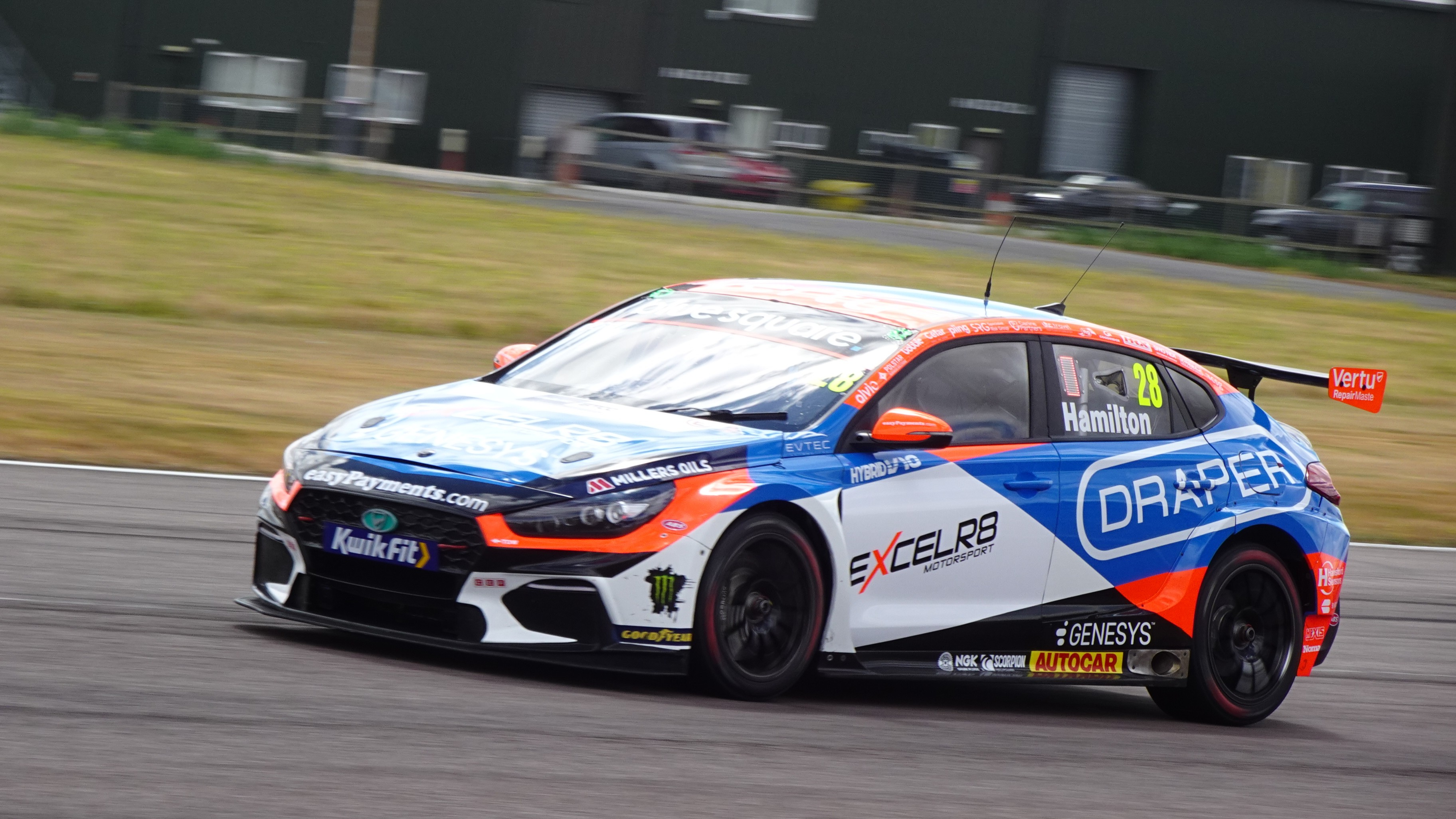
Hamilton racing in 2026 at the Thruxton Circuit

On 27th March 2025, Hamilton returned to the BTCC with Un-Limited Motorsport (rebranded as Powder Monkey Brewing Co with Esidock) partnering Dexter Patterson and Max Hall. He finished the season 28th in the championship.

In 2026, Hamilton moved away from the Cupra Leon and drove the Hyundai i30 Fastback N Performance after he signed with reigning champions Team VERTU. He partnered reigning champion Tom Ingram, Tom Chilton and returnee Ricky Collard.

On 24 May 2026, Hamilton was awarded the Jack Sears Trophy for the Snetterton round.

== Media career ==
On 8 March 2016, it was announced that Hamilton would be part of Channel 4's Formula One presentation team.

== Racing record ==
=== Career summary ===
| Season | Series | Team | Races | Wins | Poles | F/Laps | Podiums | Points | Position |
|---|---|---|---|---|---|---|---|---|---|
| 2011 | Renault Clio Cup UK | Total Control Racing | 16 | 0 | 0 | 0 | 0 | 113 | 14th |
| 2011 | Volkswagen Scirocco R-Cup | | 0 | 0 | 0 | 0 | 0 | 0 | NC† |
| 2012 | Renault Clio Cup UK | Total Control Racing | 16 | 0 | 0 | 0 | 0 | 54 | 21st |
| 2013 | European Touring Car Cup | Baporo Motorsport | 6 | 0 | 0 | 0 | 0 | 12 | 10th |
| 2015 | British Touring Car Championship | AmD Tuning | 12 | 0 | 0 | 0 | 0 | 0 | NC† |
| 2017 | Renault Clio Cup UK | WDE Motorsport | 10 | 0 | 0 | 0 | 0 | 44 | 20th |
| 2018 | Renault Clio Cup UK | WDE Motorsport | 18 | 0 | 0 | 0 | 0 | 20 | 20th |
| 2019 | British Touring Car Championship | ROKiT Racing with Motorbase | 24 | 0 | 0 | 0 | 0 | 0 | 32nd |
| 2020 | British Touring Car Championship | ROKiT Racing with Team HARD. | 22 | 0 | 0 | 0 | 0 | 1 | 29th |
| 2021 | British Touring Car Championship | ROKiT Racing with iQuoto Online Trading | 29 | 0 | 0 | 0 | 0 | 0 | 29th |
| 2022 | British Touring Car Championship | Yazoo with Safuu.com Racing | 30 | 0 | 0 | 0 | 0 | 0 | 29th |
| 2023 | British Touring Car Championship | Go-Fix with Autoaid Breakdown | 15 | 0 | 0 | 0 | 0 | 10 | 24th |
| 2025 | British Touring Car Championship | Powder Monkey Brewing Co with Esidock | 28 | 0 | 0 | 0 | 0 | 0 | 28th |
| 2026 | British Touring Car Championship | Team VERTU | 30 | 0 | 0 | 0 | 0 | 12 | 23rd |

^{†} As Hamilton was a guest driver, he was ineligible for points.

=== Complete British Touring Car Championship results ===
(key) (Races in bold indicate pole position – 1 point awarded just in first race; races in italics indicate fastest lap – 1 point awarded all races; * signifies that driver led race for at least one lap – 1 point given all races; ^{Superscript} number indicates points-scoring qualifying race position)

| Year | Team | Car | 1 | 2 | 3 | 4 | 5 | 6 | 7 | 8 | 9 | 10 | 11 | 12 | 13 | 14 | 15 | 16 | 17 | 18 | 19 | 20 | 21 | 22 | 23 | 24 | 25 | 26 | 27 | 28 | 29 | 30 | DC | Points |
|---|---|---|---|---|---|---|---|---|---|---|---|---|---|---|---|---|---|---|---|---|---|---|---|---|---|---|---|---|---|---|---|---|---|---|
| 2015 | AmD Tuning | Audi S3 Saloon | BRH; 1 | BRH; 2 | BRH; 3 | DON; 1 | DON; 2 | DON; 3 | THR; 1 | THR; 2 | THR; 3 | OUL; 1 | OUL; 2 | OUL; 3 | CRO; 1; 25 | CRO; 2; 25 | CRO; 3; 22 | SNE; 1 Ret | SNE; 2; 16 | SNE; 3; 22 | KNO; 1 | KNO; 2 | KNO; 3 | ROC; 1; 20 | ROC; 2; 24 | ROC; 3; 17 | SIL; 1 Ret | SIL; 2; 25 | SIL; 3; 22 | BRH; 1 | BRH; 2 | BRH; 3 | NC† | 0† |
| 2019 | ROKiT Racing with Motorbase | Ford Focus RS | BRH; 1; 20 | BRH; 2; 26 | BRH; 3; 20 | DON; 1 Ret | DON; 2; 19 | DON; 3 Ret | THR; 1; 24 | THR; 2 Ret | THR; 3; 24 | CRO; 1; 24 | CRO; 2; 28 | CRO; 3; 20 | OUL; 1; 22 | OUL; 2; 25 | OUL; 3; 19 | SNE; 1; 22 | SNE; 2; 20 | SNE; 3; 18 | THR; 1; 26 | THR; 2; 27 | THR; 3 Ret | KNO; 1 Ret | KNO; 2; 26 | KNO; 3; 25 | SIL; 1 | SIL; 2 | SIL; 3 | BRH; 1 | BRH; 2 | BRH; 3 | 32nd | 0 |
| 2020 | ROKiT Racing with Team HARD. | Volkswagen CC | DON; 1 Ret | DON; 2 Ret | DON; 3; 21 | BRH; 1; 22 | BRH; 2; 17 | BRH; 3; 15 | OUL; 1 Ret | OUL; 2; 23 | OUL; 3 Ret | KNO; 1 | KNO; 2 | KNO; 3 | THR; 1 Ret | THR; 2 Ret | THR; 3 Ret | SIL; 1; 24 | SIL; 2; 24 | SIL; 3; 21 | CRO; 1 Ret | CRO; 2 DNS | CRO; 3; 21 | SNE; 1; 23 | SNE; 2 Ret | SNE; 3 DNS | BRH; 1 Ret | BRH; 2; 25 | BRH; 3; 20 | | | | 29th | 1 |
| 2021 | ROKiT Racing with iQuoto Online Trading | Cupra León | THR; 1; 26 | THR; 2; 22 | THR; 3; 17 | SNE; 1; 28 | SNE; 2; 25 | SNE; 3; 25 | BRH; 1; 28 | BRH; 2; 26 | BRH; 3; 28 | OUL; 1 DNS | OUL; 2; 24 | OUL; 3 Ret | KNO; 1; 24 | KNO; 2 Ret | KNO; 3 NC | THR; 1; 28 | THR; 2; 25 | THR; 3; 22 | CRO; 1; 25 | CRO; 2 Ret | CRO; 3; 20 | SIL; 1; 24 | SIL; 2; 25 | SIL; 3; 27 | DON; 1; 28 | DON; 2; 28 | DON; 3; 24 | BRH; 1 Ret | BRH; 2 Ret | BRH; 3; 23 | 29th | 0 |
| 2022 | Yazoo with Safuu.com Racing | Cupra León | DON; 1; 19 | DON; 2; 23 | DON; 3; 24 | BRH; 1; 27 | BRH; 2; 21 | BRH; 3; 24 | THR; 1; 26 | THR; 2; 24 | THR; 3 Ret | OUL; 1; 22 | OUL; 2; 27 | OUL; 3; 22 | CRO; 1; 23 | CRO; 2; 22 | CRO; 3; 21 | KNO; 1; 24 | KNO; 2; 24 | KNO; 3 Ret | SNE; 1; 24 | SNE; 2; 23 | SNE; 3 Ret | THR; 1; 26 | THR; 2 Ret | THR; 3 Ret | SIL; 1; 23 | SIL; 2 Ret | SIL; 3 Ret | BRH; 1; 21 | BRH; 2 Ret | BRH; 3 Ret | 29th | 0 |
| 2023 | Go-Fix with Autoaid Breakdown | Cupra León | DON; 1; 21 | DON; 2; 6 | DON; 3; 21 | BRH; 1; 21 | BRH; 2; 25 | BRH; 3; 19 | SNE; 1; 23 | SNE; 2; 24 | SNE; 3 Ret | THR; 1; 22 | THR; 2; 22 | THR; 3; 23 | OUL; 1; 21 | OUL; 2; 22 | OUL; 3; 24 | CRO; 1 WD | CRO; 2 WD | CRO; 3 WD | KNO; 1 | KNO; 2 | KNO; 3 | DON; 1 | DON; 2 | DON; 3 | SIL; 1 | SIL; 2 | SIL; 3 | BRH; 1 | BRH; 2 | BRH; 3 | 24th | 10 |
| 2025 | Powder Monkey Brewing Co with Esidock | Cupra León | DON; 1; 21 | DON; 2; 19 | DON; 3; 22 | BRH; 1 Ret | BRH; 2; 19 | BRH; 3; 23 | SNE; 1; 18 | SNE; 2; 22 | SNE; 3; 22 | THR; 1 Ret | THR; 2; 18 | THR; 3; 17 | OUL; 1; 19 | OUL; 2; 20 | OUL; 3 Ret | CRO; 1 Ret | CRO; 2; 22 | CRO; 3 Ret | KNO; 1 Ret | KNO; 2; 20 | KNO; 3; 18 | DON; 1; 20 | DON; 2; 20 | DON; 3; 19 | SIL; 1 Ret | SIL; 2 WD | SIL; 3 WD | BRH; 1; 18 | BRH; 2; 19 | BRH; 3; 16 | 28th | 0 |
| 2026 | Team VERTU | Hyundai i30 Fastback N Performance | DON; 1; 17 | DON; 2 Ret | DON; 3; 18 | BRH; 1 Ret | BRH; 2; 11 | BRH; 3; 19 | SNE; 1; 17^{15} | SNE; 2; 16 | SNE; 3; 16 | OUL; 1; 19 | OUL; 2; 20 | OUL; 3; 12 | THR; 1; 20 | THR; 2; 20 | THR; 3; 15 | KNO; 1; 22 | KNO; 2 Ret | KNO; 3; 16 | DON; 1; 17 | DON; 2; 18 | DON; 3; 16 | CRO; 1; 21 | CRO; 2; 19 | CRO; 3; 16 | SIL; 1; 17 | SIL; 2; 15 | SIL; 3; 20 | BRH; 1; 20 | BRH; 2; 21 | BRH; 3; 16 | 23rd | 12 |

† As Hamilton was a guest driver, he was ineligible for points.
