= Ollie Jackson =

British racing driver (born 1984)

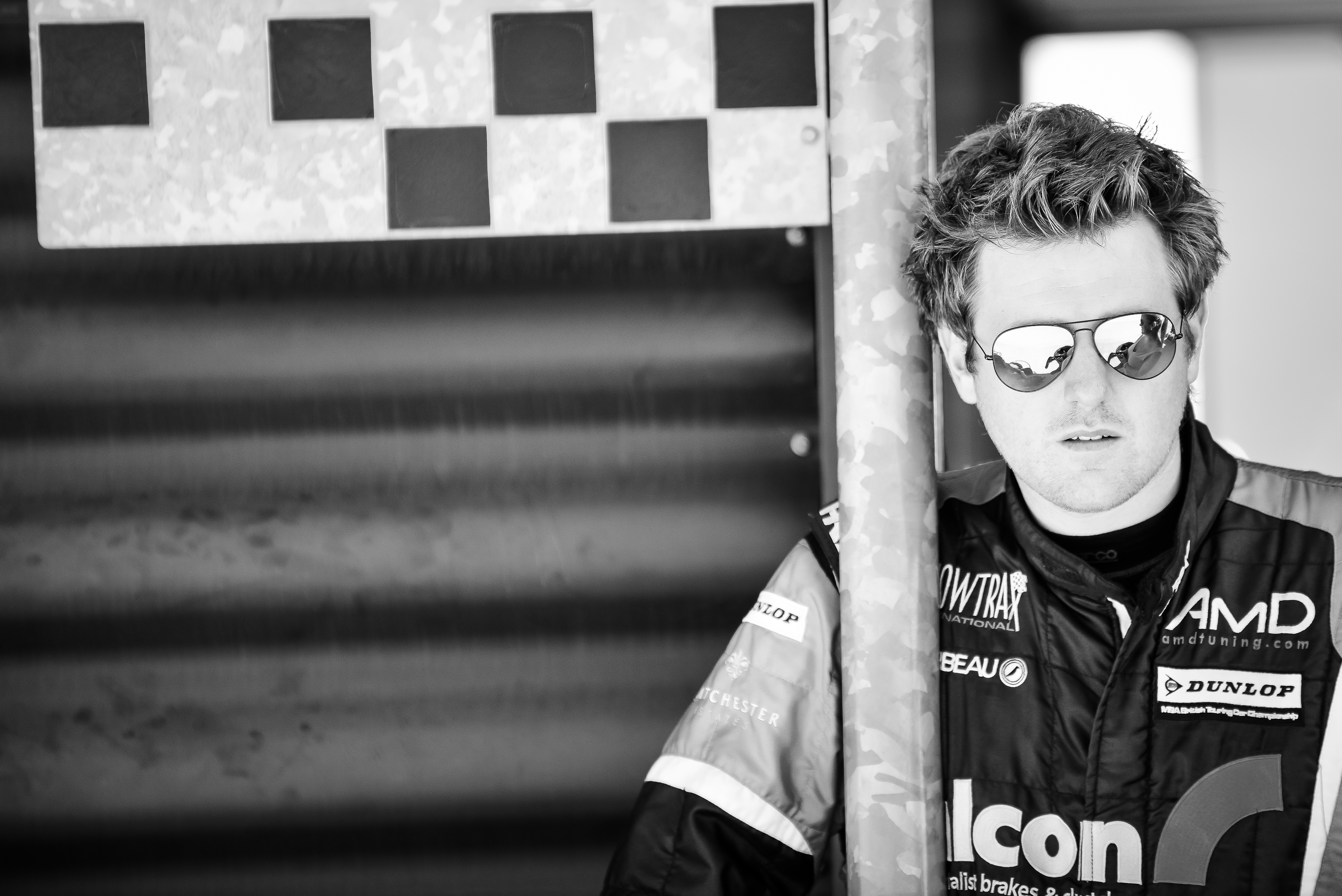
- Jackson at BTCC Rockingham 2017
- Nationality: British
- Born: Oliver Jackson; 26 April 1984 (age 42) Reigate, England

Porsche Carrera Cup GB career
- Debut season: 2023 (second stint)
- Current team: Joe Tandy Racing
- Car number: 48
- Starts: 0
- Wins: 0
- Poles: 0
- Fastest laps: 0

Previous series
- 2011–2022 2011 2008–2010 2008 2006–2007 2005: British Touring Car Championship; British GT Championship; Porsche Carrera Cup GB; Caterham Superlights; Caterham Graduates; Caterham Academy

Championship titles
- 2010: Porsche Carrera Cup GB Pro-Am1

Oliver Jackson (born 26th April 1984 in Reigate, Surrey) is a British racing driver who currently competes in the Porsche Carrera Cup GB series.

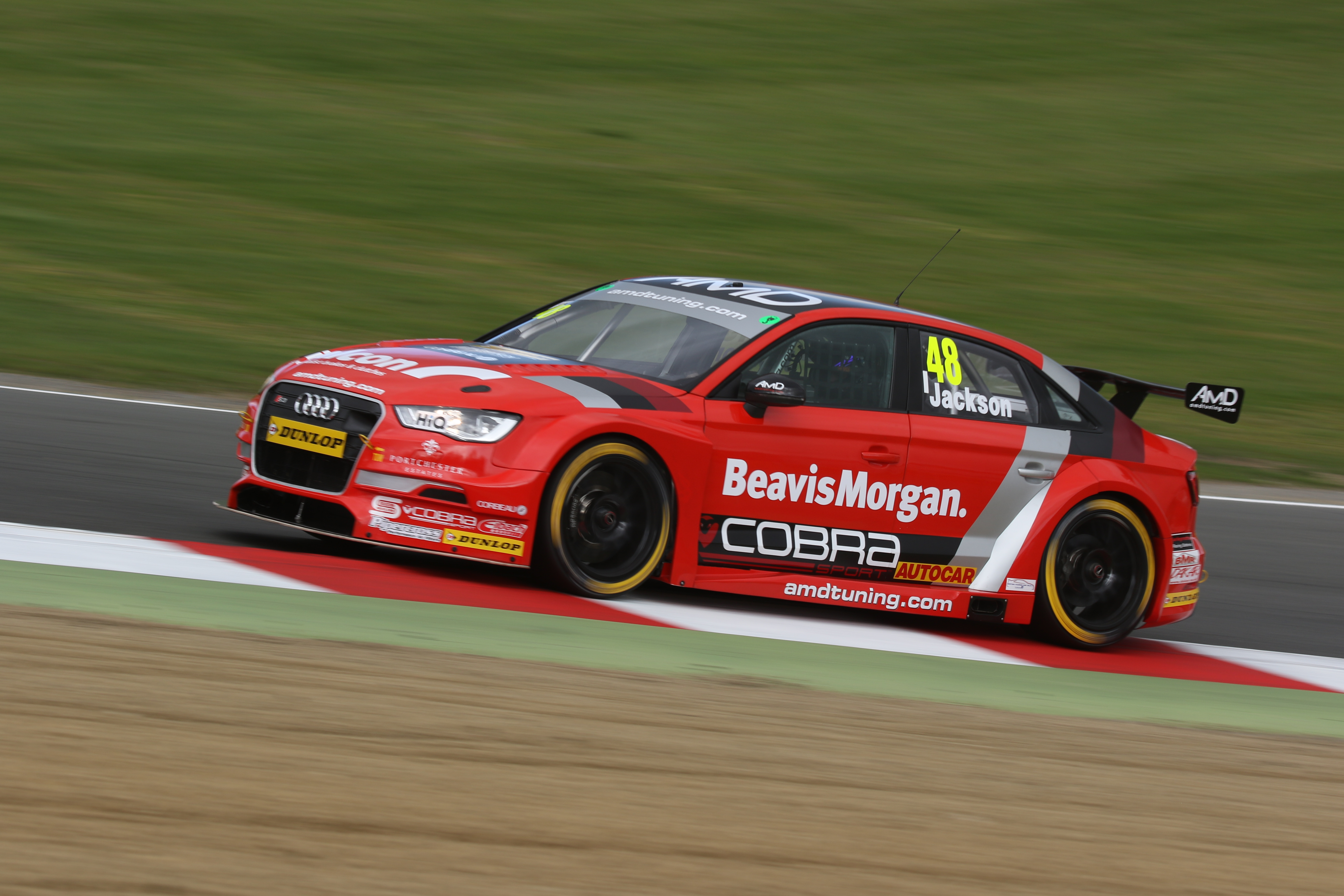
Ollie Jackson AmD Tuning Cobra Exhausts Audi BTCC Brands Hatch 2017

== Personal life ==
Ollie Jackson is from Reigate, Surrey and was educated at Epsom College. He then obtained a BSc in Computer Information Systems from the University of Bath and an MSc in Automotive Product Engineering from Cranfield University. His current occupation is Chief Engineer for Controlled Braking at Alcon Specialist Brakes and Clutches in Tamworth, Staffordshire. He previously worked at Lotus Engineering as a Vehicle Dynamics Engineer.

== Racing career ==
=== Caterhams ===
Jackson started his racing career driving in the Caterham Academy, a series for novice drivers. He took one race win in 2005 before moving up to the Mega Graduate Class in 2006, claiming two wins. He took two further wins in 2007 to finish as runner-up in the championship. For 2008, he raced in Caterham Superlights and took two victories on the way to second in the championship.

=== Porsche Carrera Cup GB (First Stint) ===
In 2009, Jackson moved up to the Porsche Carrera Cup Great Britain racing for Motorbase Performance. In his maiden season, he finished seventh on 163 points. He stayed with the team for 2010, winning 11 of the 20 races as winner of the pro-am1 category and claiming pro-am1 title ahead of Jonas Gelžinis and Tony Gilham. At the end of 2009, Jackson had an unrivalled record in the Carrera Cup Great Britain having scored points in all 40 races he competed in.

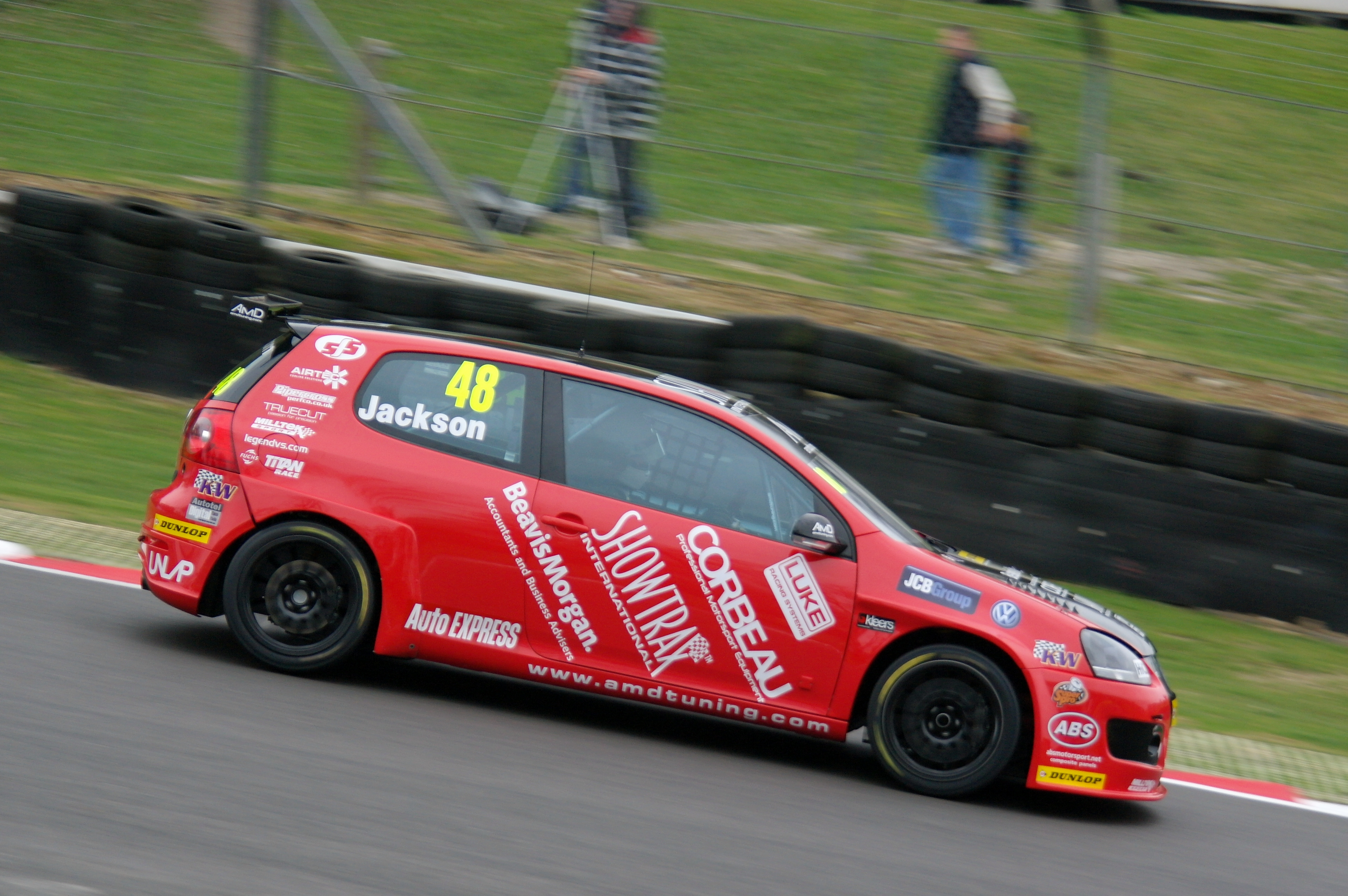
Jackson driving for AmD Tuning.com at Brands Hatch in the 2012 British Touring Car Championship.

=== British GT ===
In January 2011, Jackson was announced as a driver for the new works-backed Lotus team which would compete in the GT4 category of the British GT Championship with the Lotus Evora. He competed in the first eight rounds of the championship, finishing sixth in the GT4 category with a class win at Spa-Francorchamps.

=== British Touring Car Championship ===
==== Triple 8 (2011) ====
In September 2011, Triple 8 Race Engineering announced they had signed Jackson to race one of their Vauxhall Vectras in the final two rounds of the 2011 British Touring Car Championship season. He ended the season 26th in the overall drivers' championship and 20th in the independents' trophy.

==== AmD Tuning.com (2012) ====
Jackson continued in the BTCC in 2012, this time driving for AmD Tuning.com in their S2000-NGTC Volkswagen Golf. Jackson and the team missed the Knockhill round to go testing before they resumed racing at Rockingham. Jackson finished 18th in the drivers' championship and 13th in the independents' trophy at the end of the season, claiming three top-ten finishes.

==== Speedworks Motorsport (2013) ====
Jackson joined Speedworks Motorsport team for the 2013 season, driving a full Next Generation Touring Car–spec Toyota Avensis alongside Dave Newsham.

==== Welch Motorsport (2014) ====
Jackson joined Welch Motorsport for the 2014 season, as confirmed at the Autosport International Show at the NEC Birmingham.

==== AmD Tuning.com (2016–2018) ====
On 9 March 2016, Jackson was confirmed at AmD Tuning.com in their Audi S3 Saloon, finishing 26th with 14 points. He continued with the team for two more seasons, scoring a podium at Brands Hatch in 2018. He finished 22nd with 42 points in 2017 and 23rd with 59 in 2018.

==== Motorbase Performance (2019–) ====
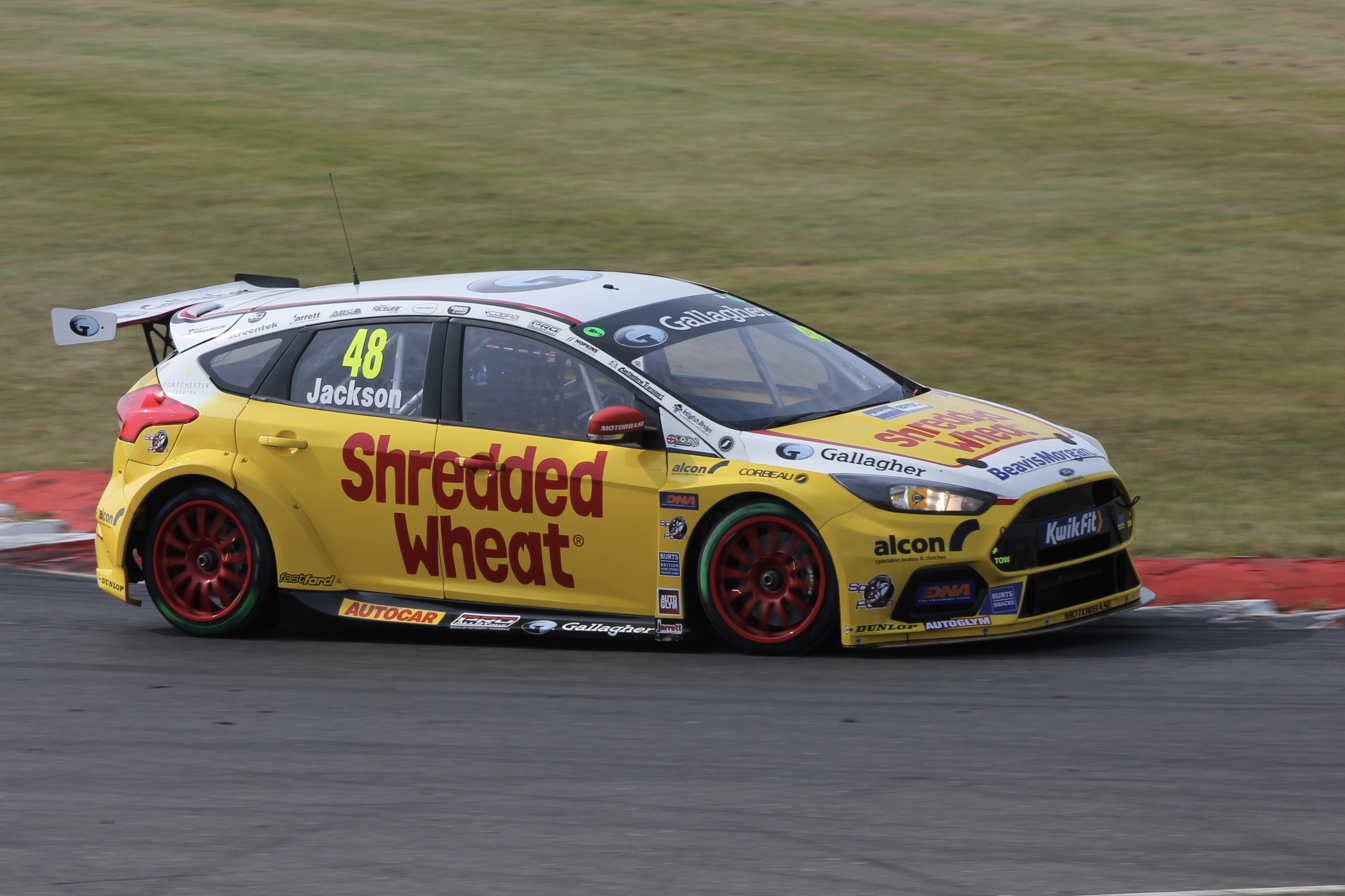
Jackson driving the Motorbase Performance Ford Focus RS at Snetterton during the 2019 British Touring Car Championship season.

For 2019, Jackson returned to Motorbase Performance, running under the Team Shredded Wheat Racing with Gallagher banner alongside Tom Chilton, with Nicolas Hamilton also part of the line-up. He finished 19th in the standings with 81 points and on 28 January 2020, it was confirmed that he would return for a second consecutive season in a new Ford Focus ST Mk.IV. At Silverstone, Jackson secured his maiden win when he took victory in the reverse grid final race, and would go on to win again at Snetterton.

Jackson then remained with the team again for 2021, running under the MB Motorsport banner.

In February 2023, Jackson announced his departure from the BTCC, after over a decade in the championship.

=== Porsche Carrera Cup GB (Second Stint) ===
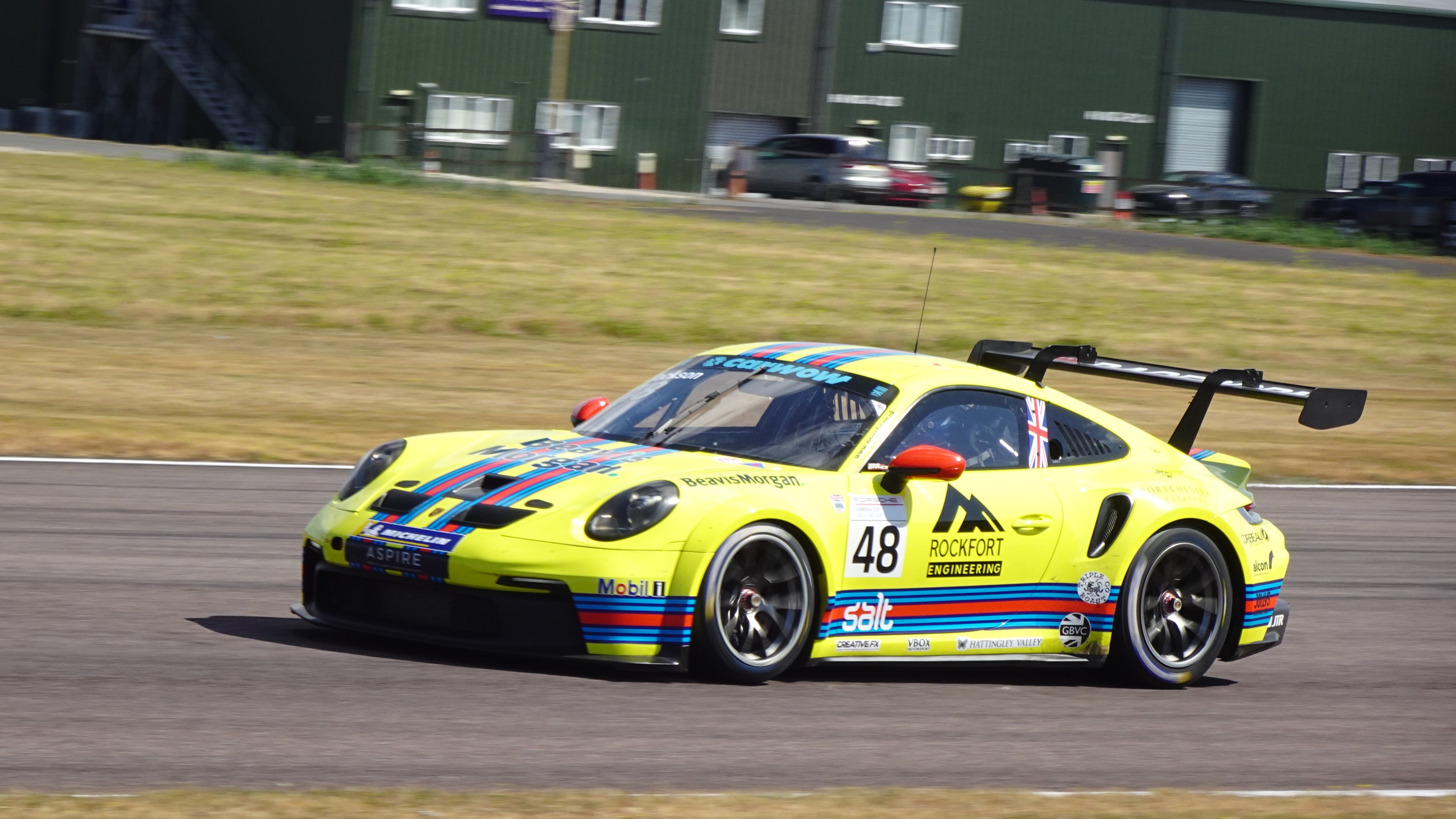
Jackson racing at Thruxton Circuit in the 2026 season

Shortly after announcing his departure from the British Touring Car Championship, it was revealed that Jackson would be returning to the Porsche Carrera Cup GB series for the 2023 season, driving for Joe Tandy Racing in the Pro-Am category.

== Racing record ==
=== Complete British GT Championship results ===
(key) (Races in bold indicate pole position) (Races in italics indicate fastest lap)

| Year | Entrant | Car | Class | 1 | 2 | 3 | 4 | 5 | 6 | 7 | 8 | 9 | 10 | DC | Points |
|---|---|---|---|---|---|---|---|---|---|---|---|---|---|---|---|
| 2011 | Lotus Sport UK | Lotus Evora | GT4 | OUL; 1 Ret | OUL; 2; 15 | SNE; 1; 11 | BRH; 1; 21 | SPA; 1; 16 | SPA; 2; 10 | ROC; 1; 17 | ROC; 2 Ret | DON; 1 | SIL; 1 | 6th | 101.5 |

=== Complete British Touring Car Championship results ===
(key) (Races in bold indicate pole position – 1 point awarded in first race) (Races in italics indicate fastest lap – 1 point awarded all races) (* signifies that driver lead race for at least one lap – 1 point awarded all races)

| Year | Team | Car | 1 | 2 | 3 | 4 | 5 | 6 | 7 | 8 | 9 | 10 | 11 | 12 | 13 | 14 | 15 | 16 | 17 | 18 | 19 | 20 | 21 | 22 | 23 | 24 | 25 | 26 | 27 | 28 | 29 | 30 | DC | Points |
|---|---|---|---|---|---|---|---|---|---|---|---|---|---|---|---|---|---|---|---|---|---|---|---|---|---|---|---|---|---|---|---|---|---|---|
| 2011 | Triple 8 Race Engineering | Vauxhall Vectra | BRH; 1 | BRH; 2 | BRH; 3 | DON; 1 | DON; 2 | DON; 3 | THR; 1 | THR; 2 | THR; 3 | OUL; 1 | OUL; 2 | OUL; 3 | CRO; 1 | CRO; 2 | CRO; 3 | SNE; 1 | SNE; 2 | SNE; 3 | KNO; 1 | KNO; 2 | KNO; 3 | ROC; 1 | ROC; 2 | ROC; 3 | BRH; 1; 11 | BRH; 2; 18 | BRH; 3; 17 | SIL; 1; 16 | SIL; 2; 13 | SIL; 3; 11 | 26th | 0 |
| 2012 | AmD Tuning.com | Volkswagen Golf | BRH; 1; 13 | BRH; 2; 8 | **BRH**; **3** Ret | DON; 1 NC | DON; 2 DNS | DON; 3 DNS | THR; 1; 12 | THR; 2; 15 | THR; 3; 15 | OUL; 1; 11 | OUL; 2; 15 | OUL; 3; 15 | CRO; 1; 11 | CRO; 2; 15 | CRO; 3 Ret | SNE; 1 Ret | SNE; 2; 15 | SNE; 3; 14 | KNO; 1 | KNO; 2 | KNO; 3 | ROC; 1 NC | ROC; 2; 8 | ROC; 3; 8 | SIL; 1; 14 | SIL; 2 NC | SIL; 3; 16 | BRH; 1 Ret | BRH; 2; 11 | BRH; 3; 11 | 18th | 61 |
| 2013 | Speedworks Motorsport | Toyota Avensis | BRH; 1; 10 | BRH; 2 Ret | BRH; 3 DNS | DON; 1; 16 | DON; 2 NC | DON; 3 Ret | THR; 1; 16 | THR; 2; 17 | THR; 3 Ret | OUL; 1; 24 | OUL; 2; 16 | OUL; 3; 15 | CRO; 1 Ret | CRO; 2 DNS | CRO; 3 Ret | SNE; 1; 16 | SNE; 2; 11 | SNE; 3; 13 | KNO; 1; 15 | KNO; 2; 15 | KNO; 3; 11 | ROC; 1; 15 | ROC; 2; 16 | ROC; 3; 15 | SIL; 1; 19 | SIL; 2 Ret | SIL; 3 Ret | BRH; 1 Ret | BRH; 2; 13 | BRH; 3; 11 | 20th | 32 |
| 2014 | STP Racing with Sopp & Sopp | Proton Persona | BRH; 1; 25 | BRH; 2; 25 | BRH; 3; 22 | DON; 1; 26 | DON; 2 Ret | DON; 3; 23 | THR; 1; 23 | THR; 2; 25 | THR; 3 Ret | OUL; 1 Ret | OUL; 2 Ret | OUL; 3; 22 | CRO; 1; 22 | CRO; 2; 19 | CRO; 3; 19 | SNE; 1; 24 | SNE; 2; 22 | SNE; 3; 24 | KNO; 1 Ret | KNO; 2 DNS | KNO; 3 DNS | ROC; 1; 27 | ROC; 2; 22 | ROC; 3; 17 | SIL; 1 Ret | SIL; 2 Ret | SIL; 3 DNS | BRH; 1; 19 | BRH; 2; 22 | BRH; 3; 21 | 29th | 0 |
| 2016 | AmD Tuning | Audi S3 Saloon | BRH; 1 Ret | BRH; 2; 23 | BRH; 3; 22 | DON; 1; 21 | DON; 2 Ret | DON; 3 Ret | THR; 1; 17 | THR; 2; 21 | THR; 3; 14 | OUL; 1; 26 | OUL; 2; 20 | OUL; 3; 25 | CRO; 1; 19 | CRO; 2; 15 | CRO; 3; 26 | SNE; 1; 19 | SNE; 2 Ret | SNE; 3 Ret | KNO; 1; 23 | KNO; 2 Ret | KNO; 3; 19 | ROC; 1; 17 | ROC; 2; 13 | ROC; 3; 11 | SIL; 1; 14 | SIL; 2; 16 | SIL; 3; 17 | BRH; 1; 18 | BRH; 2; 15 | BRH; 3 Ret | 26th | 14 |
| 2017 | AmD Tuning with Cobra Exhausts | Audi S3 Saloon | BRH; 1; 22 | BRH; 2; 14 | BRH; 3; 16 | DON; 1; 17 | DON; 2 Ret | DON; 3; 15 | THR; 1; 18 | THR; 2; 16 | THR; 3; 17 | OUL; 1; 14 | OUL; 2; 26 | OUL; 3; 18 | CRO; 1; 13 | CRO; 2; 9 | **CRO**; **3**; 10* | SNE; 1; 18 | SNE; 2; 14 | SNE; 3 Ret | KNO; 1; 28 | KNO; 2; 19 | KNO; 3 Ret | ROC; 1; 14 | ROC; 2; 12 | ROC; 3; 11 | SIL; 1; 12 | SIL; 2 Ret | SIL; 3 Ret | BRH; 1; 14 | BRH; 2; 15 | BRH; 3; 16 | 22nd | 42 |
| 2018 | AmD with Cobra Exhausts | Audi S3 Saloon | BRH; 1; 12 | BRH; 2; 3 | BRH; 3; 14 | DON; 1; 19 | DON; 2; 29 | DON; 3; 16 | THR; 1; 25 | THR; 2; 17 | THR; 3 Ret | OUL; 1; 14 | OUL; 2; 9 | OUL; 3; 21 | CRO; 1; 14 | CRO; 2; 25 | CRO; 3; 22 | SNE; 1 Ret | SNE; 2 Ret | SNE; 3; 12 | ROC; 1; 16 | ROC; 2; 11 | ROC; 3; 9 | KNO; 1; 16 | KNO; 2 Ret | KNO; 3 Ret | SIL; 1; 17 | SIL; 2; 25 | SIL; 3; 23 | BRH; 1; 17 | BRH; 2; 15 | BRH; 3; 12 | 23rd | 59 |
| 2019 | Team Shredded Wheat Racing with Gallagher | Ford Focus RS | BRH; 1 Ret | BRH; 2; 18 | BRH; 3 Ret | DON; 1 Ret | DON; 2; 11 | DON; 3; 16 | THR; 1; 16 | THR; 2 Ret | THR; 3; 16 | CRO; 1 Ret | CRO; 2; 20 | CRO; 3; 11 | OUL; 1; 10 | OUL; 2; 13 | OUL; 3; 13 | SNE; 1; 8 | SNE; 2; 4 | SNE; 3; 7 | THR; 1; 15 | THR; 2; 18 | THR; 3; 15 | KNO; 1 Ret | KNO; 2; 18 | KNO; 3; 15 | SIL; 1; 18 | SIL; 2; 14 | SIL; 3; 19 | BRH; 1; 10 | BRH; 2; 6 | BRH; 3; 8 | 19th | 81 |
| 2020 | Motorbase Performance | Ford Focus ST Mk.IV | DON; 1; 17 | DON; 2; 11 | DON; 3; 5* | BRH; 1; 3 | BRH; 2; 5 | BRH; 3 Ret | OUL; 1; 13 | OUL; 2; 15 | OUL; 3; 19 | KNO; 1; 16 | KNO; 2; 13 | KNO; 3 Ret | THR; 1; 14 | THR; 2; 14 | THR; 3; 13 | SIL; 1; 13 | SIL; 2; 8 | **SIL**; **3**; 1* | CRO; 1; 14 | CRO; 2 Ret | CRO; 3; 12 | SNE; 1; 21 | SNE; 2; 8 | SNE; 3; 1* | BRH; 1; 5 | BRH; 2; 5 | BRH; 3; 10 | | | | 12th | 152 |
| 2021 | MB Motorsport accelerated by Blue Square | Ford Focus ST | THR; 1; 19 | THR; 2; 13 | THR; 3; 9 | SNE; 1; 5 | SNE; 2; 3 | SNE; 3 Ret | BRH; 1; 23 | BRH; 2; 16 | BRH; 3 Ret | OUL; 1; 12 | OUL; 2 Ret | OUL; 3; 17 | KNO; 1 Ret | KNO; 2; 22 | KNO; 3; 15 | THR; 1; 17 | THR; 2; 18 | THR; 3 Ret | CRO; 1 Ret | CRO; 2; 14 | CRO; 3 Ret | SIL; 1; 12 | SIL; 2; 18 | SIL; 3; 10 | DON; 1; 10 | DON; 2; 14 | DON; 3; 11 | BRH; 1; 10 | BRH; 2 Ret | BRH; 3; 11 | 18th | 77 |
| 2022 | Apec Racing with Beavis Morgan | Ford Focus ST | DON; 1 Ret | DON; 2 Ret | DON; 3; 19 | BRH; 1; 23 | BRH; 2; 14 | BRH; 3; 12 | THR; 1 Ret | THR; 2 NC | THR; 3; 18 | OUL; 1; 20 | OUL; 2; 24 | OUL; 3; 14 | CRO; 1 Ret | CRO; 2; 20 | CRO; 3; 15 | KNO; 1; 23 | KNO; 2; 21 | KNO; 3; 21 | SNE; 1; 18 | SNE; 2; 13 | SNE; 3; 9 | THR; 1; 18 | THR; 2; 17 | THR; 3; 14 | SIL; 1; 19 | SIL; 2; 11 | SIL; 3; 9 | BRH; 1 Ret | BRH; 2; 23 | BRH; 3; 22 | 22nd | 33 |

=== Complete Porsche Supercup results ===
(key) (Races in bold indicate pole position; races in italics indicate fastest lap)

| Year | Team | 1 | 2 | 3 | 4 | 5 | 6 | 7 | 8 | Pos. | Points |
|---|---|---|---|---|---|---|---|---|---|---|---|
| 2024 | Century Motorsport | IMO | MON | RBR | SIL; 23 | HUN | SPA | ZND | MNZ | NC† | 0† |

^{†} As Jackson was a guest driver, he was ineligible for points.
