= Audi S3 =

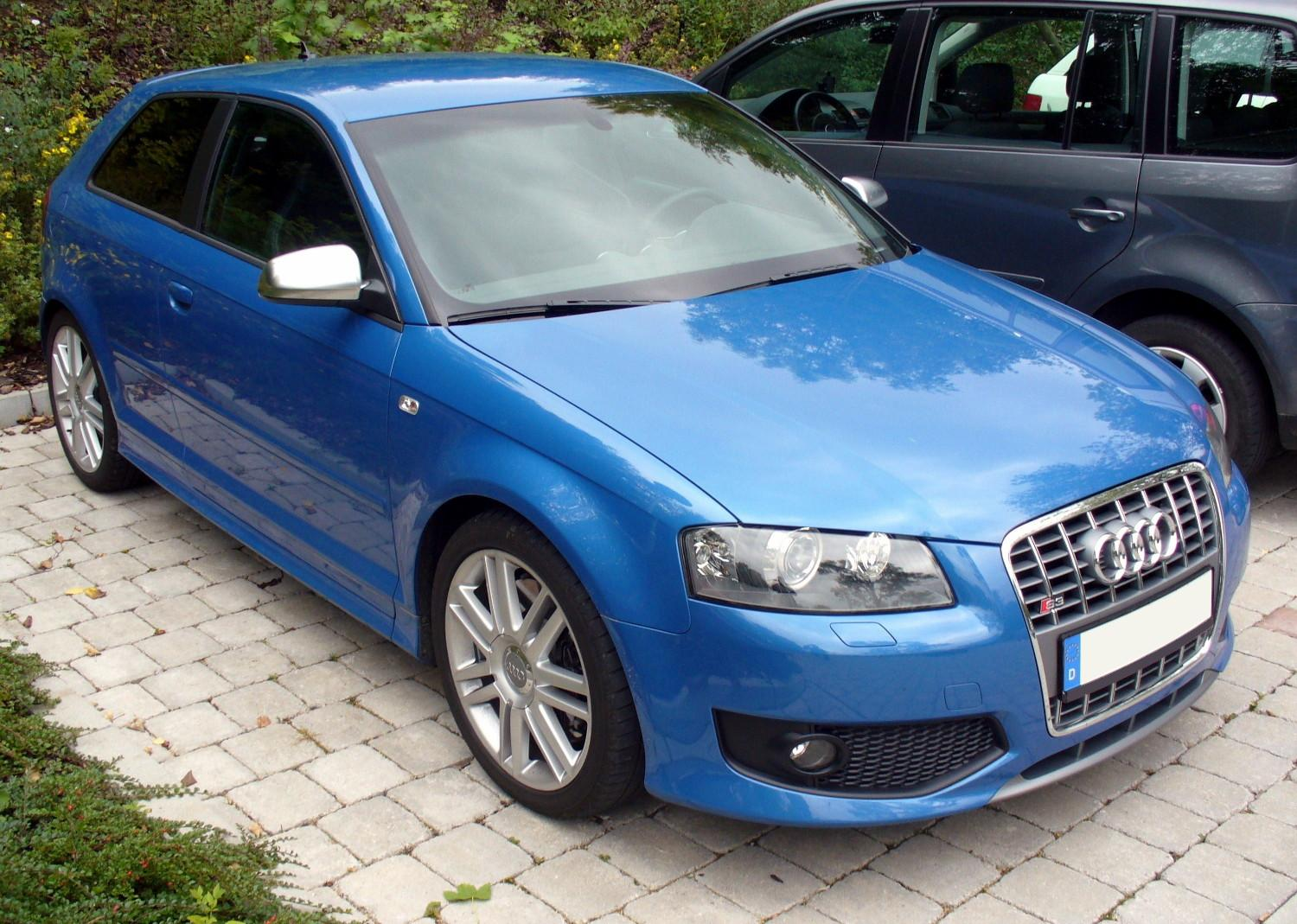
- Audi S3 (8P)

Overview
- Manufacturer: Audi AG
- Production: 1999—present
- Assembly: Ingolstadt, Germany

Body and chassis
- Class: Subcompact executive car (2013-present) (C)
- Body style: 3 or 5-door hatchback 4-door sedan
- Layout: transverse front engine, quattro on-demand four-wheel drive
- Related: Audi A3

Powertrain
- Transmission: 6-speed manual or S-Tronic

The Audi S3 is a performance version of the Audi A3 small family car, produced by German automaker Audi since 1999. S3 variants of have been produced from the first generation through the fourth generation of Audi A3.

Like all Audi S models, it is only available with quattro four-wheel drive system.

== First generation (Typ 8L, 1999–2003) ==
Audi S3 (8L)
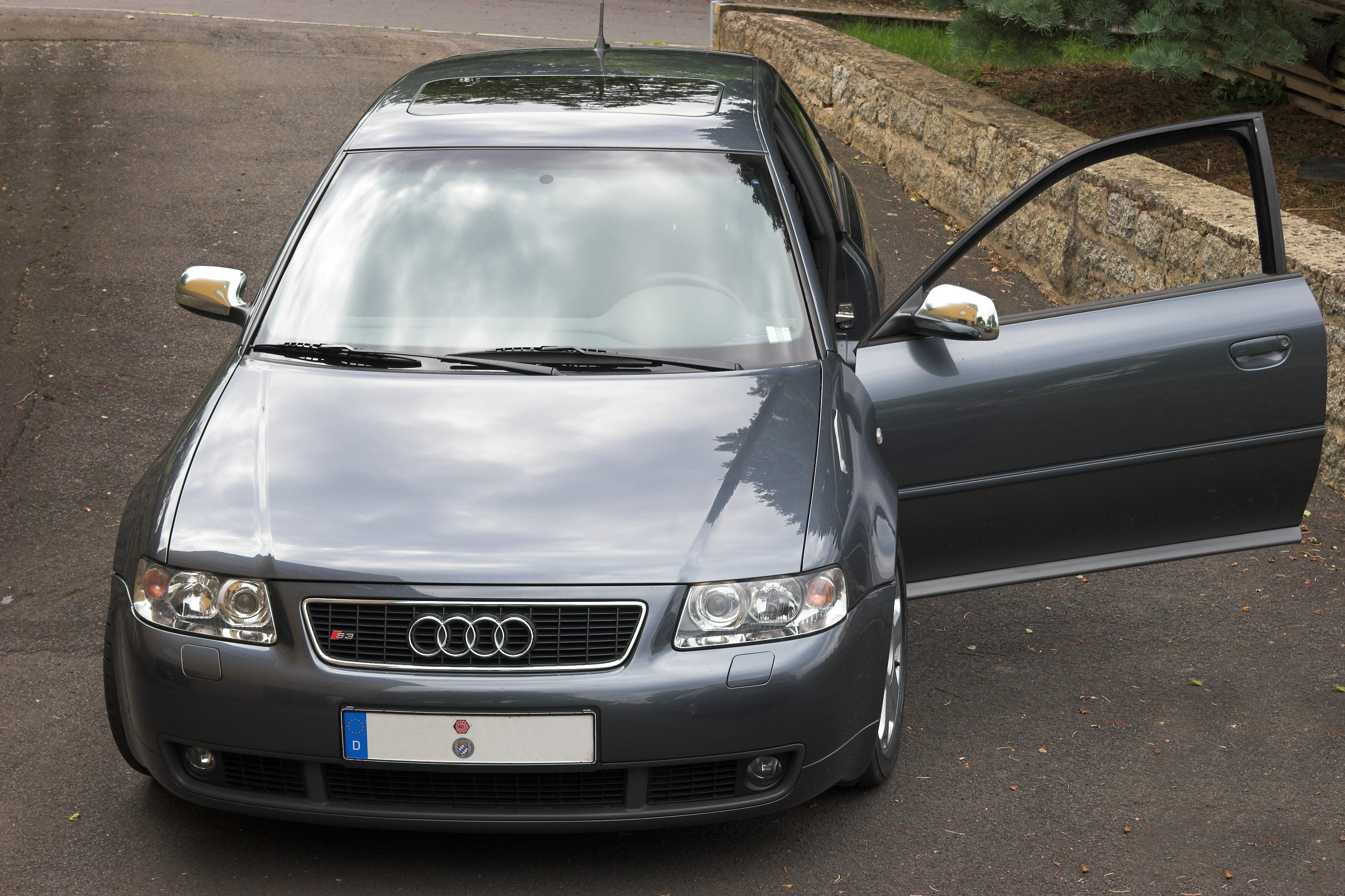

Overview
- Production: 1999—2003

Body and chassis
- Body style: 3-door hatchback
- Platform: Volkswagen A4 (PQ34)
- Related: Audi TT; VW Golf Mk4; Škoda Octavia; SEAT León

Powertrain
- Engine: 1.8L I4 20v turbo

=== Overview ===
The first generation S3 is built on the same A platform of the Audi A3, Volkswagen Golf Mk4, Audi TT, SEAT León and Škoda Octavia.

The straight-4 20v 1.8 L turbocharged petrol engine comes in two versions of power output: 210 PS (154 kW; 207 hp) and 225 PS (165 kW; 222 hp). Early models (1999–2001) had 210 PS (154 kW; 207 hp) which is said to be a de-tuned Audi TT engine, and was said to be reduced to lessen brand competition with the more powerful TT. Later models (2001–2003) had variable valve timing and 225 PS (165 kW; 222 hp). The engine provides a maximum 280 N⋅m (210 ft⋅lbf) of torque, most of which is available from 2200 through to 5500 rpm. This is the first time a small five-valve engine has been used in an Audi S-series car..

Although dubbed "quattro", the S3 uses a different "on-demand" four-wheel drive system. The Haldex Traction coupling adjusts the bias of torque distribution from the front to rear axle as grip requirements change - most of the time it operates as a front-wheel drive.

The S3 was sold in the United Kingdom, Europe, Mexico, South Africa, Australia and New Zealand, but was not officially marketed in the United States.

The S3 was facelifted in 2000, where it was given one-piece headlights/indicator units, different front wings, rear lights clusters, and some minor upgrades to interior trim. There had been minor changes to the design previous to this, including digital clock on the dash.

=== Equipment ===
Standard features include xenon HID headlamps with high pressure washers and auto levellers, front fog lamps, 17" "Avus" alloy wheels with 225/45R17 tyres, electrically adjustable Recaro leather seats, climate control, alarm and Electronic Stability Programme (ESP) with traction control (ASR).

Options include a Bose sound system, boot/trunk or in-dash mounted 6 disc CD changer, metallic paint, 18 inch 9-spoke RSTT wheels, glass sunroof, centre arm rest, privacy glass (B-pillar backwards), auto dipping rear view mirror, parking assist, luggage net, heated front seats, cruise control, aluminium door mirror casings and part leather/alcantara (blue/silver/yellow) combination seat coverings. These items are standard in some export markets, where Audi is a prestigious brand.

== Second generation (Typ 8P, 2006–2012) ==
Audi S3 (8P)
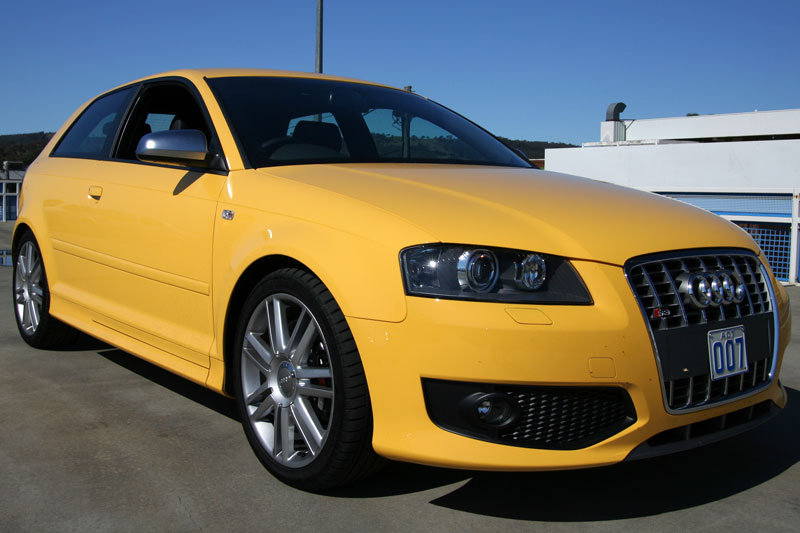

Overview
- Production: 2006—2012

Body and chassis
- Body style: 3-door hatchback, 5-door hatchback (2008-on)
- Platform: Volkswagen A5 (PQ35)
- Related: Audi TT; VW Golf Mk5; VW Jetta

Powertrain
- Engine: 2.0L I4 Turbo FSI
- Transmission: 6-speed Manual; 6-speed S tronic

Dimensions
- Kerb weight: 1,495 kg (3,296 lb)

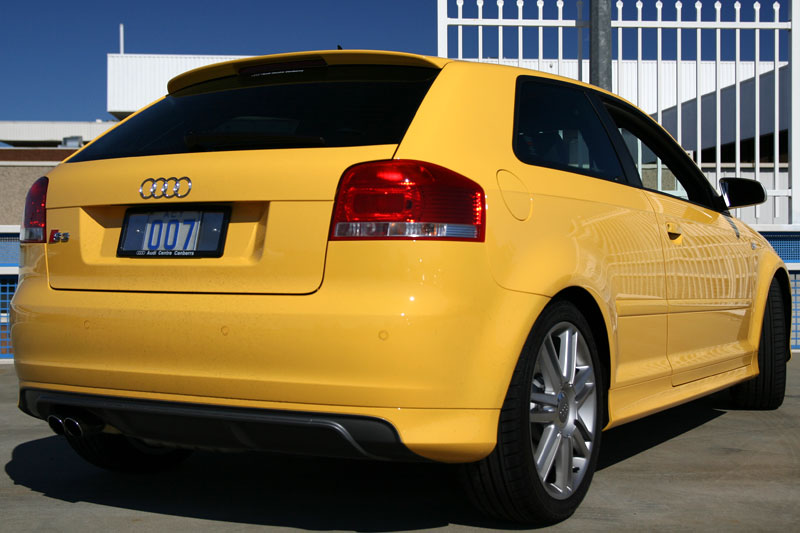
Audi S3 (8P) in Imola Yellow

The second generation Audi S3 - Typ 8P, is powered by a modified and uprated Volkswagen Group-sourced 2.0L Turbocharged FSI petrol engine, with a maximum output of 195 kW (265 PS; 261 bhp). As with all Audi S models, the design was done in-house by quattro GmbH. The engine features uprated high performance pistons, revised boost/fuel mapping, increased turbocharger size (KKK K04) and larger intercooler. The most powerful form of this widely used engine, and quattro four-wheel drive, makes for a 0–100 km/h (0–62 mph) time of 5.5 s, and an electronically limited top speed of 250 km/h (155 mph).

The chassis has had the spring rating and dampers revised, along with the body kit. Like its predecessor, although badged a "quattro" model, the S3 does not employ a Torsen centre differential (as in other common quattro models), but instead uses the Swedish Haldex Traction system in its on-demand four-wheel drive transmission, due to the transverse engine layout.

In the United Kingdom, the S3 is priced notably higher than many of its rivals. BMW's 130i M Sport offers 265 bhp (198 kW; 269 PS), but is slower to 100 km/h (62 mph) at 6.0 seconds. Other cars of similar power are a good deal cheaper; the Volkswagen Golf Mk5 R32 sports 184 kW (250 PS; 247 bhp), with 0–100 km/h (0–62 mph) achieved in 6.2 seconds. The Vauxhall Astra VXR comes with less power - 240 bhp (179 kW; 243 PS) - but manages 0–100 kilometres per hour (0–62 mph) in 6.5 seconds, whilst the SEAT León Cupra (2.0 T-FSI with 177 kW (241 PS; 237 bhp)), Volvo C30 (225 bhp (168 kW; 228 PS) 2.5-litre inline-5 turbo), and Mazdaspeed3 (2.3-litre turbocharged engine with 263 bhp (196 kW; 267 PS)) also provide competition. Only the S3 and R32 are four-wheel drive, however, though the 130i M Sport is rear-wheel drive.

Audi has stated the S3 will not be sold in North/South America, although it is available in Mexico. Reasons range from pricing and competition with the Volkswagen Golf R32, and/or stealing sales from the new Audi TT and due to cost effectiveness in the North American market. Audi has announced a 2.0T quattro model for the North/South American market due out in 2009/2010 to coincide with the A3 body upgrade.

=== Audi S3 Sportback ===
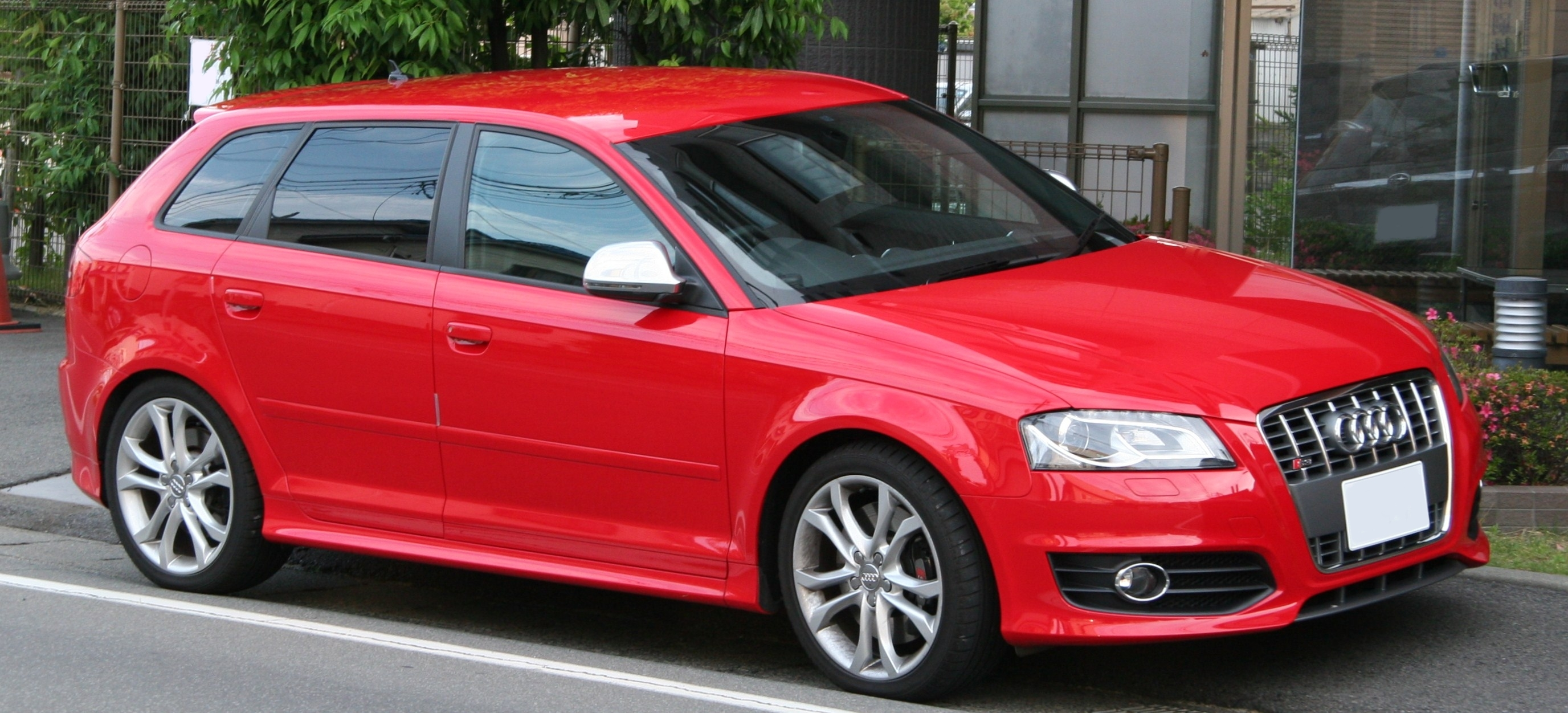
Audi S3 Sportback

In April 2008, Audi announced a five-door S3 variant based on the A3 Sportback (Typ 8PA), with the same engine and transmission as the existing 8P S3.

At the same time a minor facelift of the 3-door S3 (in common with the A3) was also announced.

== Third generation (Typ 8V 2013–2020) ==
Audi S3 (8V)
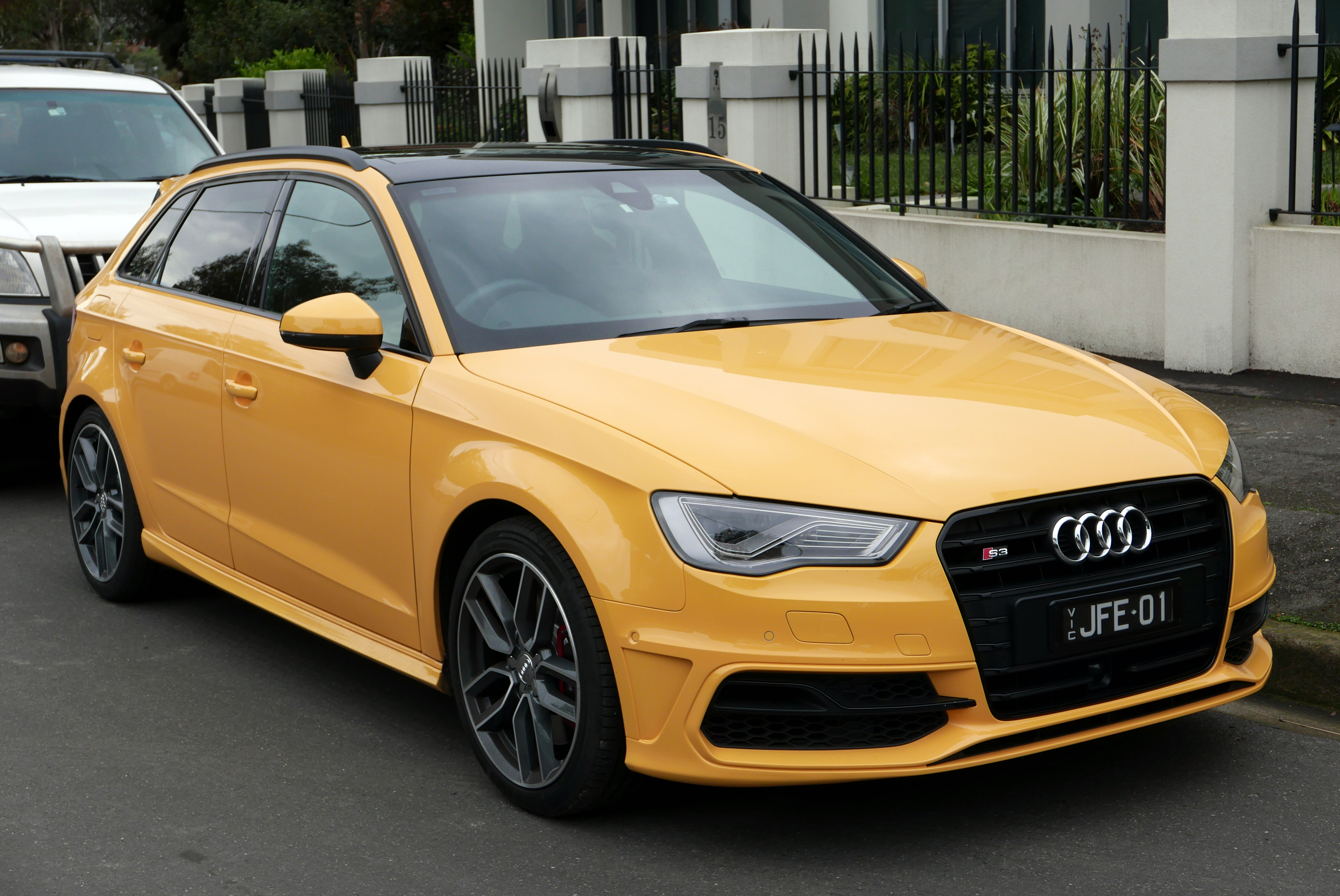

Overview
- Production: 2014–2020

Body and chassis
- Body style: 2-door convertible 3-door hatchback 4-door saloon 5-door hatchback
- Related: Audi TT; VW Golf Mk7

Powertrain
- Engine: 2.0L I4 Turbo TFSI
- Transmission: 6-speed S tronic 6-speed manual

At the September 2012, the third generation of the Audi S3 based on the A3 8V was initially presented as a three-door model. The market launch took place in spring 2013.

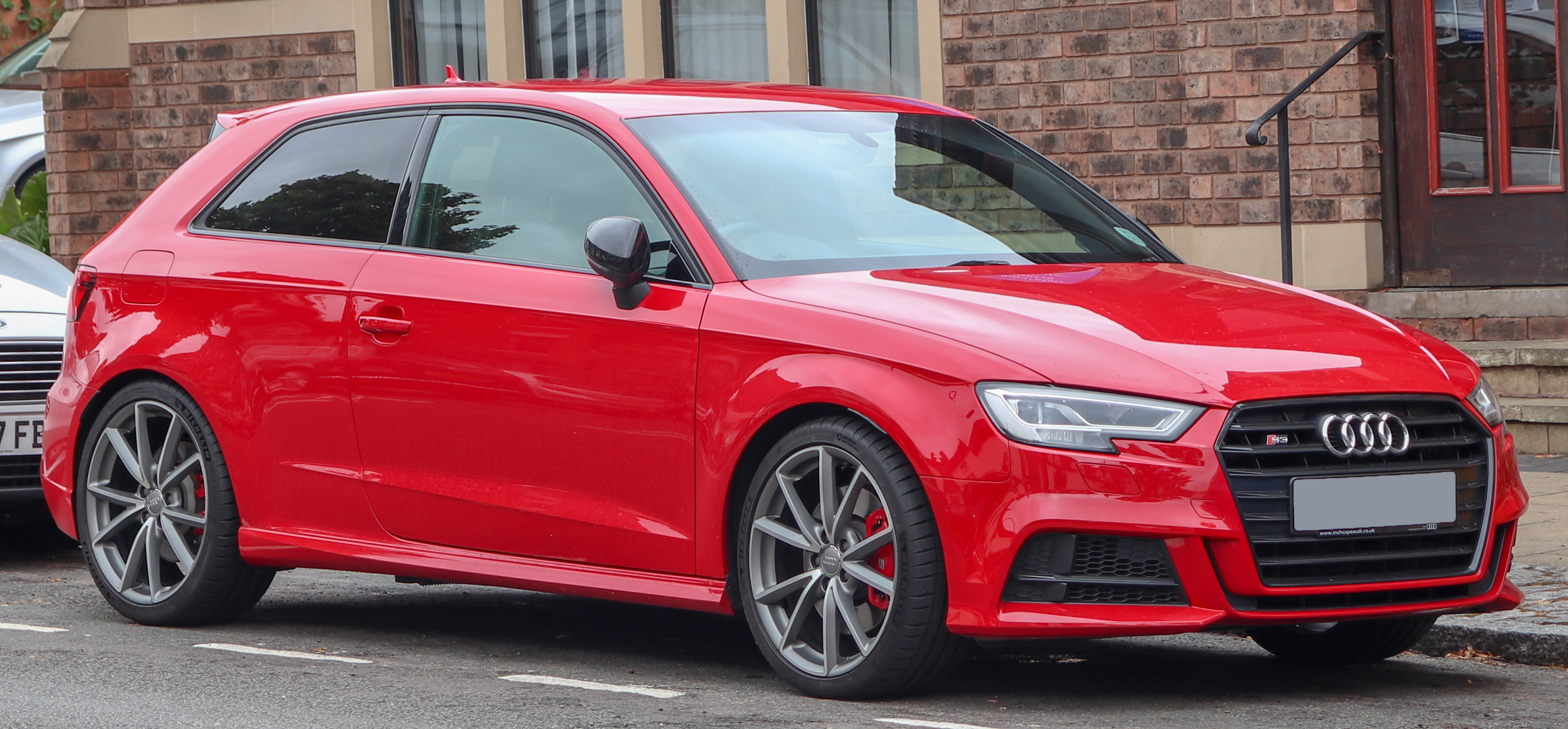
Audi S3 facelift

The engine used is a 2.0-liter gasoline engine with a turbocharger and an output of 221 kW (300 hp). A six-speed manual transmission and quattro all-wheel drive come as standard. The 6-speed S tronic dual clutch transmission is available for an additional charge.

In autumn 2013, the S3 was also available as a notchback version. Deliveries of the sedan began at the beginning of 2014. It is characterized by a low, flowing roof dome that ends in a coupe-like, flat C-pillar. The trunk volume of the S3 notchback is 425 litres.

A convertible version has also been on the market since July 2014. The S3 Cabriolet has a fabric top that opens and closes in less than 18 seconds at the touch of a button (while driving up to 50 km/h).

In mid-2016, Audi started facelift production of the Audi S3 8V. The most important changes in appearance were more striking taillights with dynamic indicators as standard and more angular headlights. Furthermore, the front and rear bumpers including the diffuser received significant visual changes. In addition, the engine power was increased from 300 to 310 hp compared to the pre-facelift.

== Fourth generation (Typ 8Y, 2020–present) ==
Audi S3 (8Y)
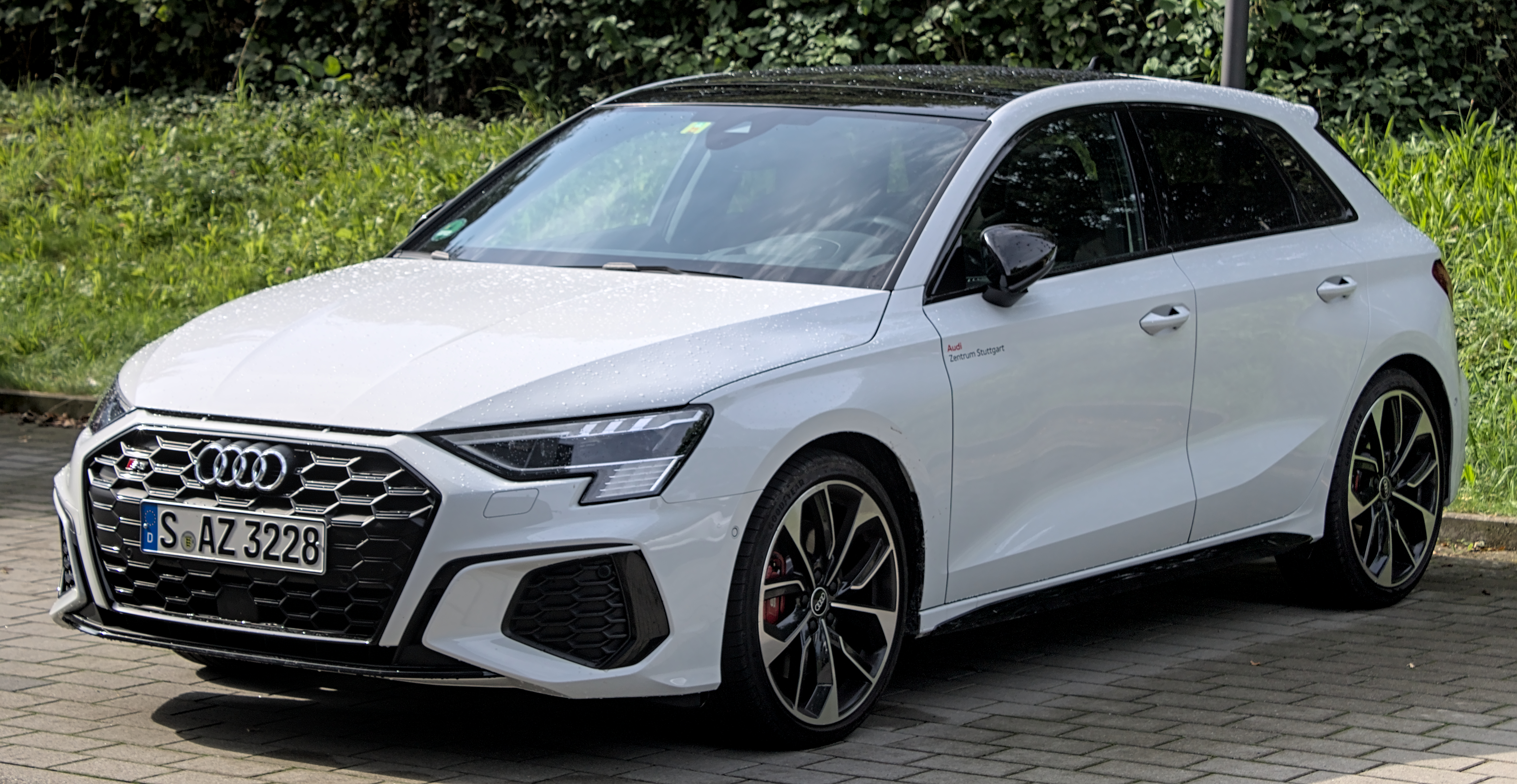

Overview
- Production: 2020—present

Body and chassis
- Body style: 5-door hatchback 4-door saloon
- Related: Audi TT; VW Golf Mk8

Powertrain
- Engine: 2.0L EA888 Evo 4 I4 Turbo FSI
- Transmission: 7-speed S tronic

The fourth generation based on the Audi A3 8Y was presented on August 11. It came to dealers at the beginning of October 2020. In contrast to the previous model, only two body variants are available instead of four, the hatchback and sedan.

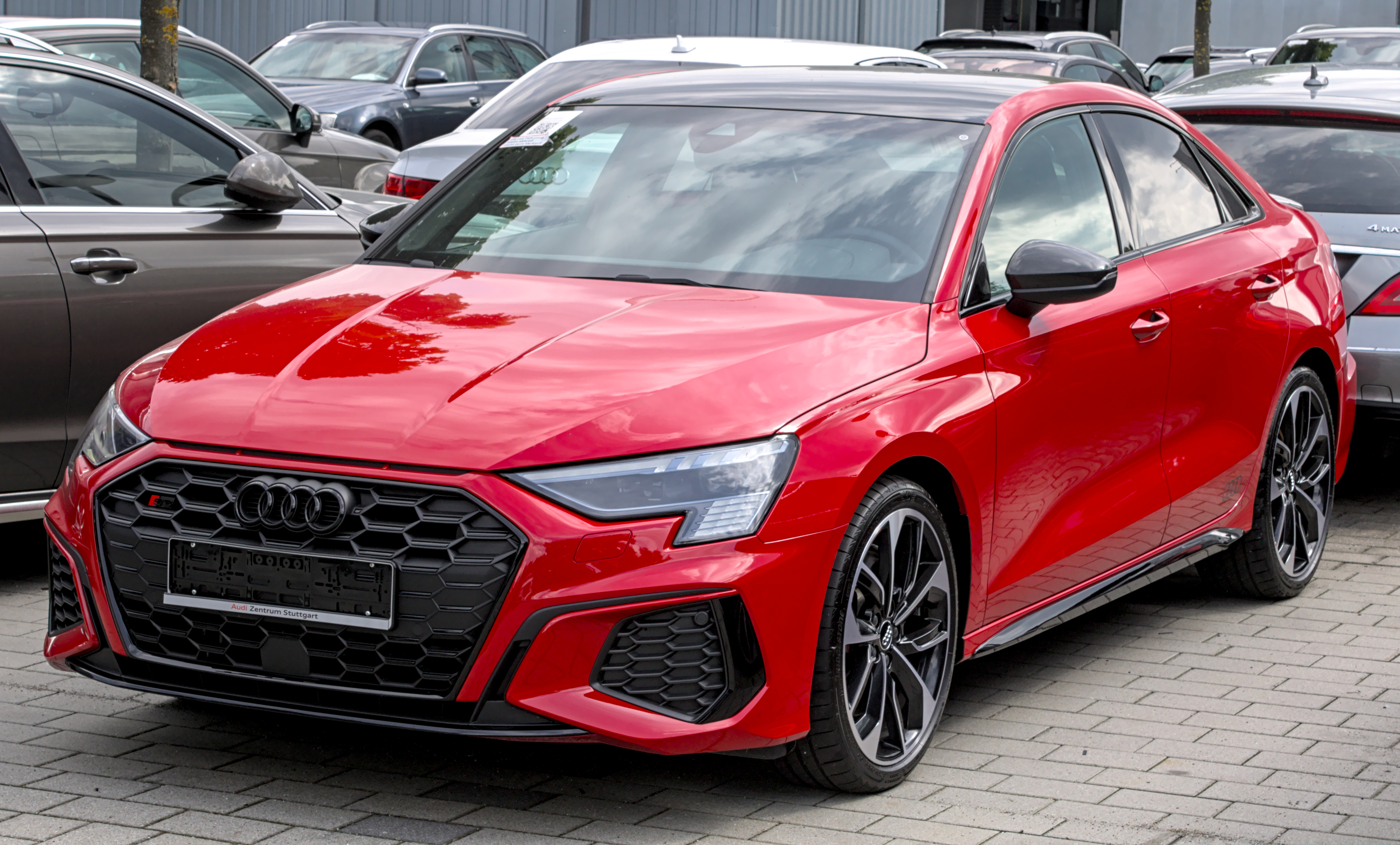
Audi S3 Saloon (Pre-Facelift)

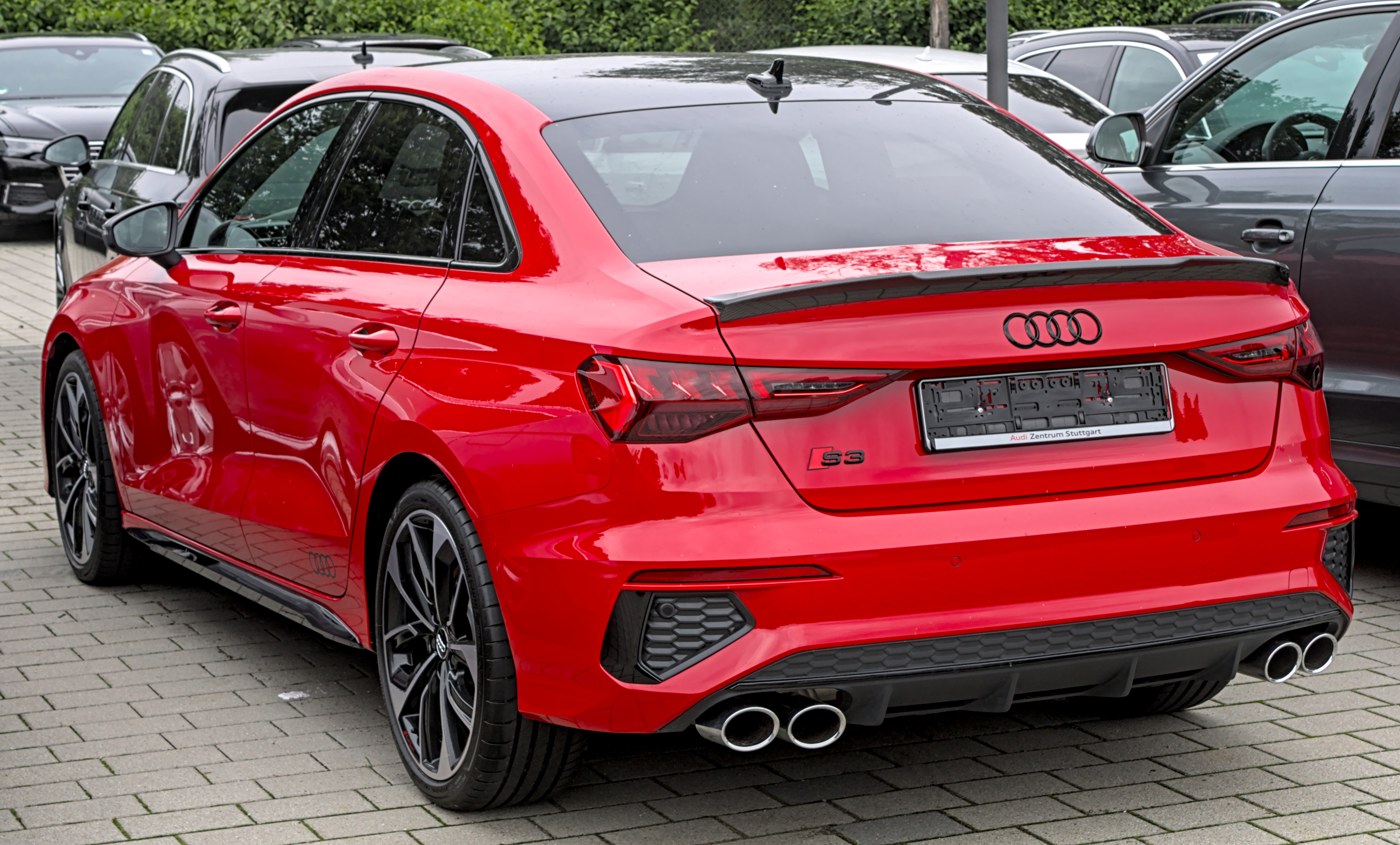
Audi S3 Saloon (Pre-Facelift)

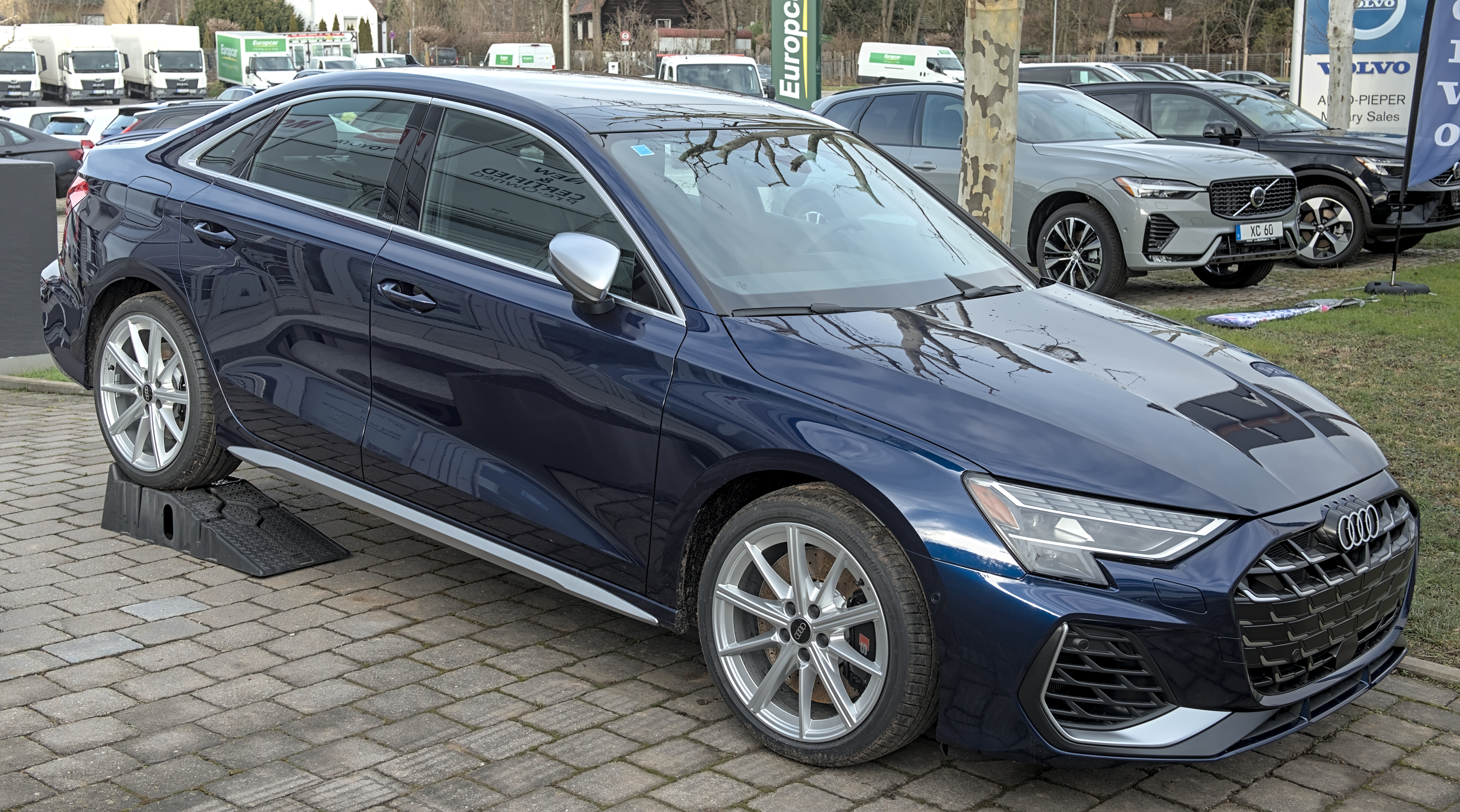
Audi S3 Saloon (Facelift)

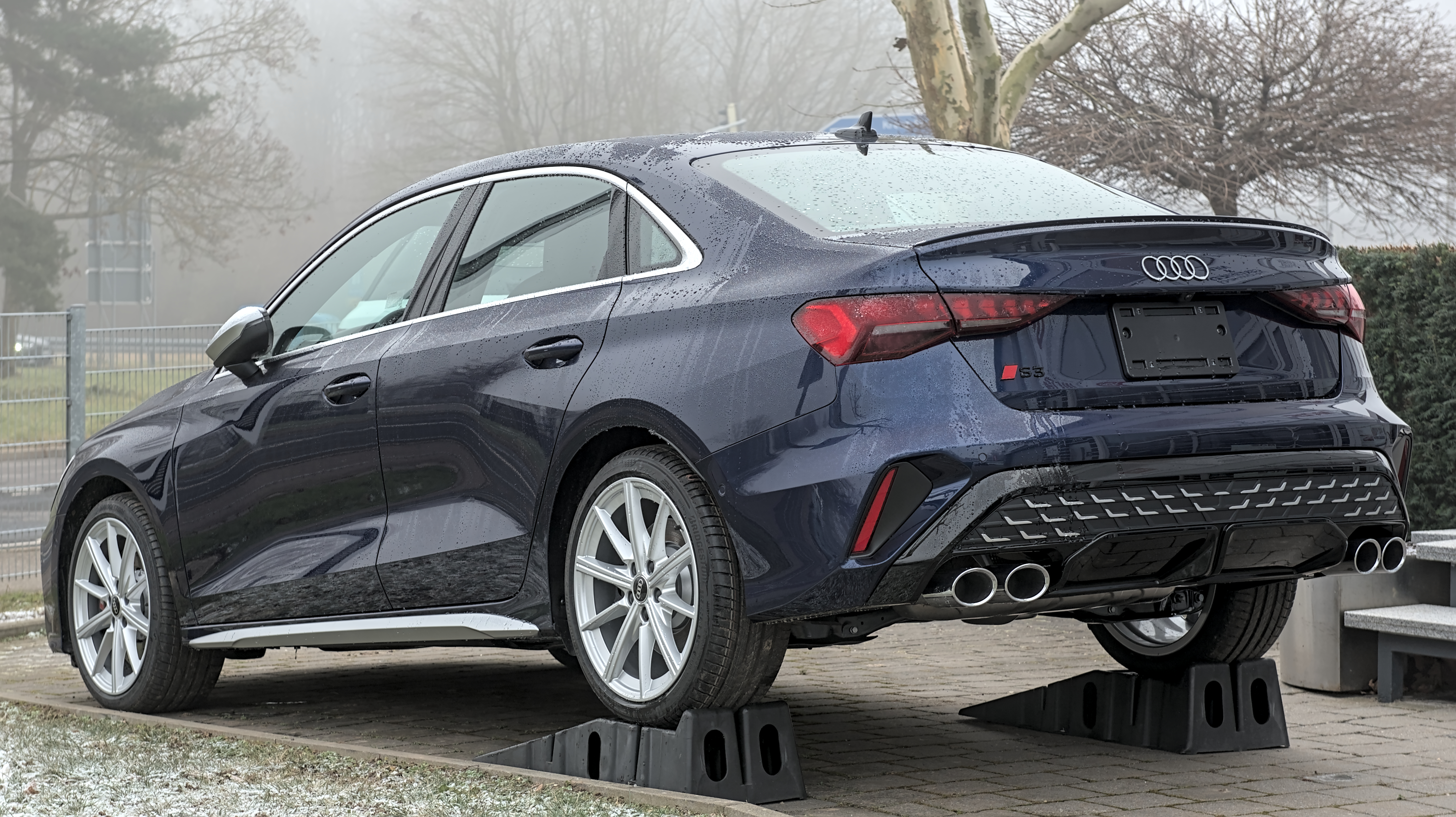
Audi S3 Saloon (Facelift)

== See also ==
- Audi S and RS models
