= Rob Austin =

British racing driver (born 1981)

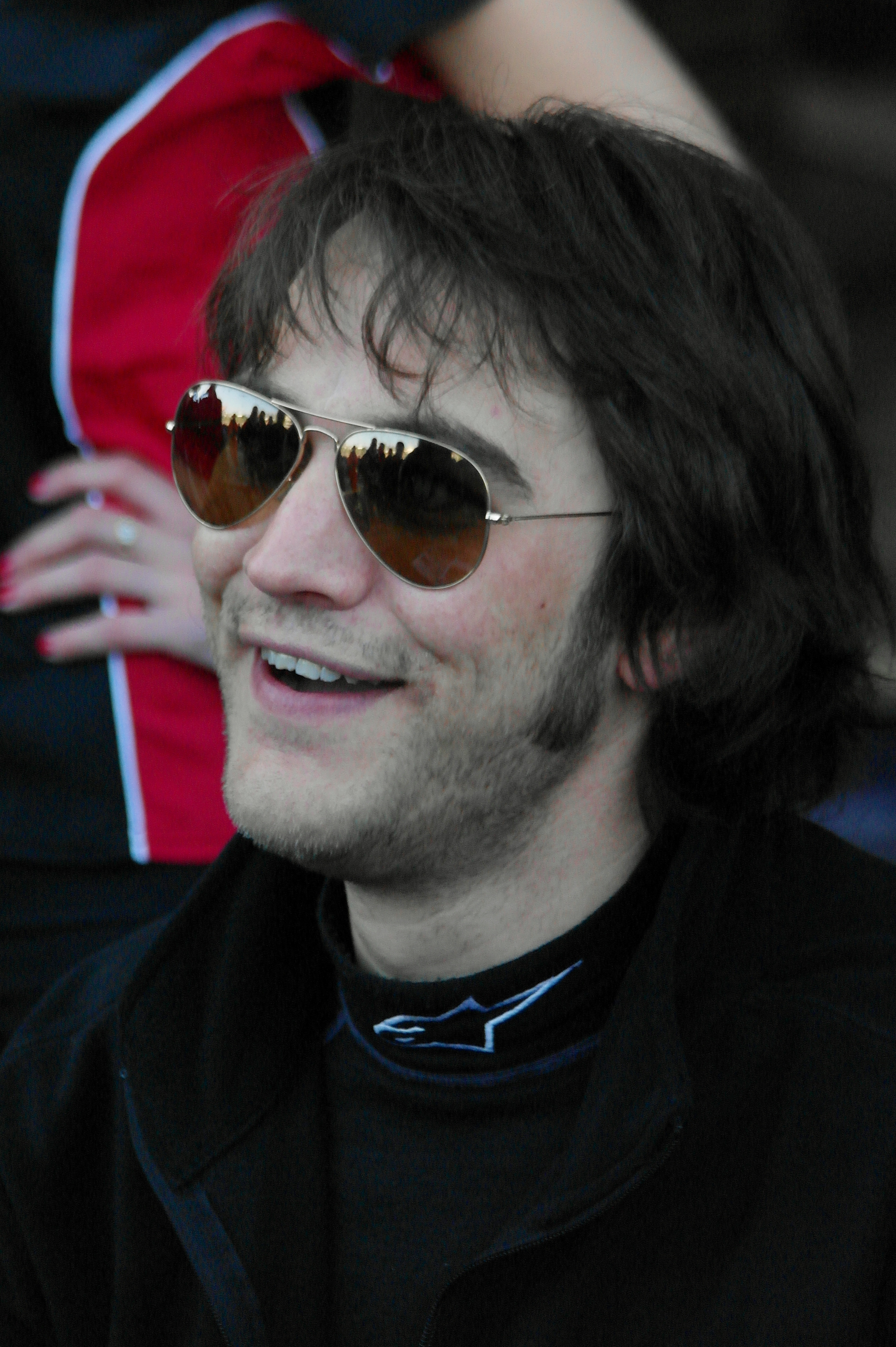
- Austin at the Brands Hatch Indy round of the 2012 British Touring Car Championship season
- Nationality: (United Kingdom) British
- Born: Robert Christopher Austin; 1 February 1981 (age 45) Evesham, Worcestershire, England, UK

British Touring Car Championship career
- Debut season: 2011
- Current team: Power Maxed Car Care Racing
- Car number: 11
- Former teams: Rob Austin Racing, DUO Motorsport with HMS Racing
- Starts: 229
- Wins: 3
- Poles: 2
- Fastest laps: 4
- Best finish: 11th in 2013, 2017

Previous series
- 2012 2010 2008–2009 2008 2007 2005 2000–2004: VW Cup; Grand Prix Masters; Ginetta G50 Cup; British GT; SEAT Cupra Championship; Formula Three Euroseries; British Formula 3

Robert Christopher Austin (born 1 February 1981) is a British racing driver who formerly competed in the British Touring Car Championship. He was born in Evesham, Worcestershire.

== Racing career ==
=== Formula 3 ===
Austin's career started in British Formula Renault in 1998, where he raced until 1999. An accident put him out of racing for the 2000 season, but he returned in British Formula 3 for Alain Menu's team in 2001, where he raced until 2004. He also has Japanese Formula Three experience (2003).

=== British GT Championship ===
Austin entered the British GT Championship in 2008 with a brand new Ginetta G50 GT4 under the Rob Austin Racing banner. He drove alongside Hunter Abbott although they missed the first event at Oulton Park when Abbott crashed and destroyed the car. They took the first of three GT4 victories in the third race of the season at Knockhill having taken delivery of a new car. The pair finished the season joint third in the GT4 standings after finishing on the podium at every race they finished, except for their disqualification at Thruxton.

=== British Touring Car Championship ===
In 2011, Austin took over the driving duties from David Pinkney in the British Touring Car Championship due to Pinkney's departure from the team after the first round. He competed in a NGTC specification Audi A4 for his own team. Austin qualified a career best fourth at Knockhill but retired in the first race. He took his maiden podium finish in the third race at Rockingham, ending up second behind James Nash. He completed the season in 16th place with one podium finish and one fastest lap.

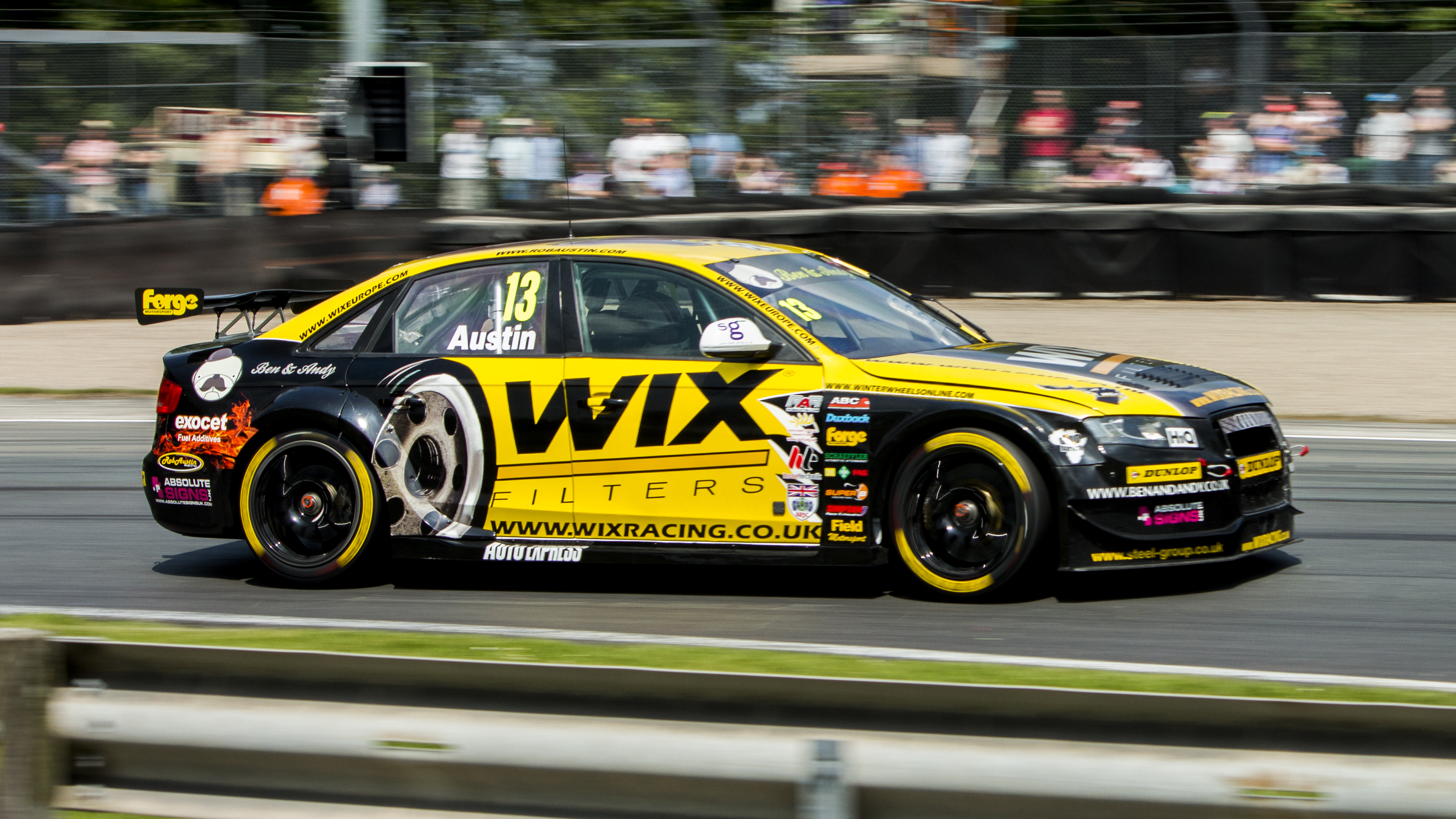
Austin competing in the 4th round of the 2013 season at Oulton Park.

Rob Austin Racing signed Mark Hazell to drive the team's Audi A4 for the start of the 2012 season, but Austin was the only entry for the season opener at Brands Hatch Indy. He finished eighth in the first race of the season and finished fifth in the following two races. Hazell left the team after Brands Hatch, leaving Austin as the team's only driver for Donington Park and Thruxton. Austin sat out the meeting at Oulton Park while series debutant and 2009 Euroseries 3000 champion Will Bratt was the team's sole entrant at the Cheshire venue. He returned to the car for the next race at Croft, taking his second podium finish in race two. He was unable to find the budget to race at Knockhill, forcing him to miss the event but he returned to the car at Rockingham. He was disqualified from the third race at Silverstone after colliding with Daniel Welch on lap three while fighting for second place. Austin secured a title sponsor for the season finale at Brands Hatch, his car would carry a special NASCAR inspired livery for Wix Filters.

Austin confirmed his return in 2013 with the team running under the WIX Filters banner. Austin led early on in the first race of the season at Brands Hatch, he was then passed by Jason Plato and eventually finished third behind Andrew Jordan. He retired from the following two races, in race three, he was collected by Dave Newsham who had spun and Austin had a high speed collision with the barriers before coming to a rest in the middle of the track. He took his first pole position in the BTCC at the Knockhill round. He took his first outright win at the next event at Rockingham; he took victory in race two ahead of Gordon Shedden. After that he only scored 11 more points for the rest of the year, finishing 11th in the standings.

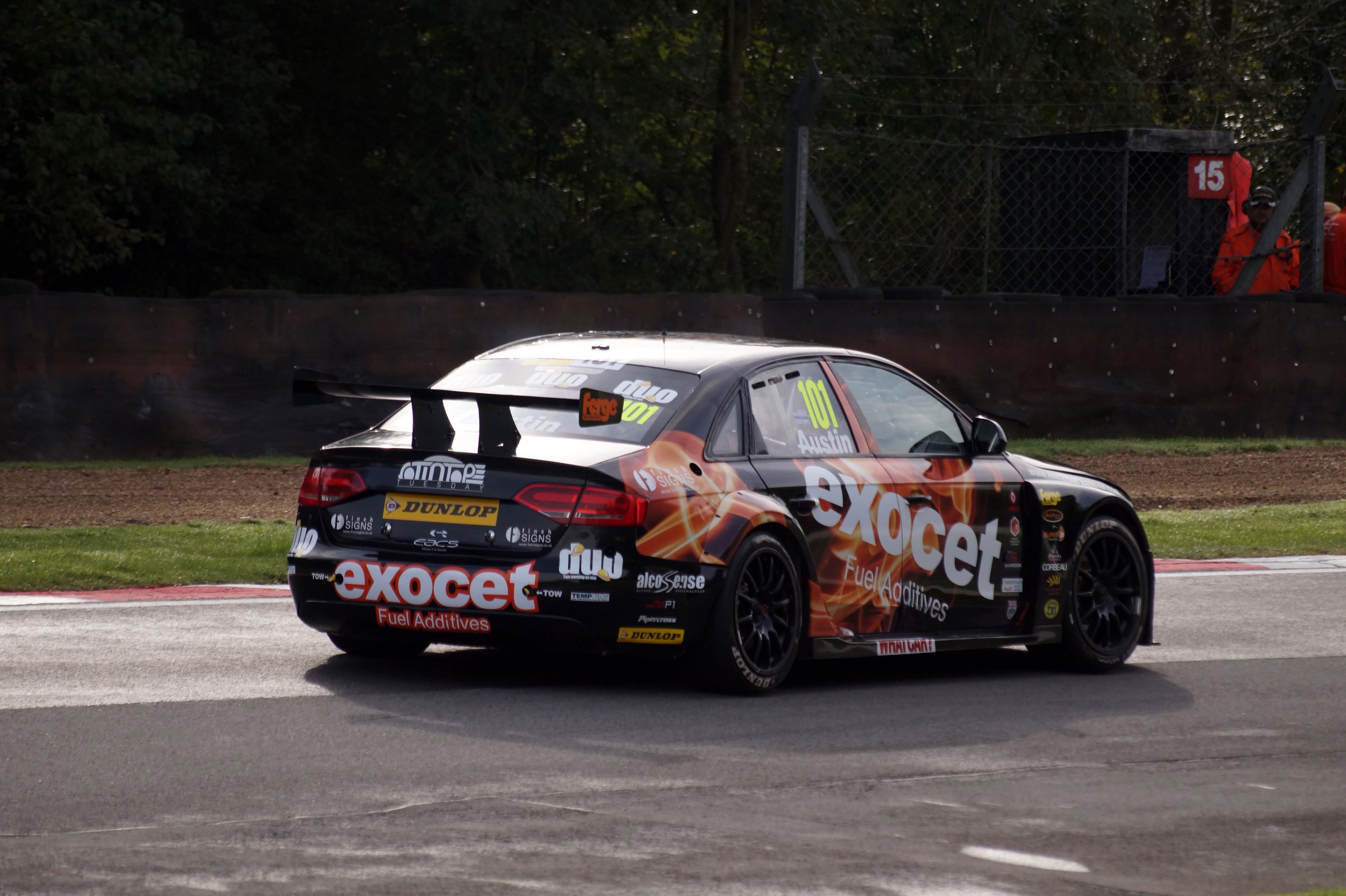
Austin driving the Exocet Racing Audi A4 at Brands Hatch during the 2014 British Touring Car Championship season.

Austin returned for the 2014 season. Exocet took over title sponsorship after the departure of WIX Filters. WIX then continued their BTCC tenure with Adam Morgan and his family run team 'Ciceley Racing'.

In March 2014, Hunter Abbott signed for Rob Austin Racing to run in a second Audi A4 in the 2014 season under the AlcoSense Racing Banner.

=== Other activities ===
Austin appeared in the Ron Howard film Rush (2013), portraying Brett Lunger and driving his Surtees TS19, which is owned by his father for racing in historic events.

== Racing record ==
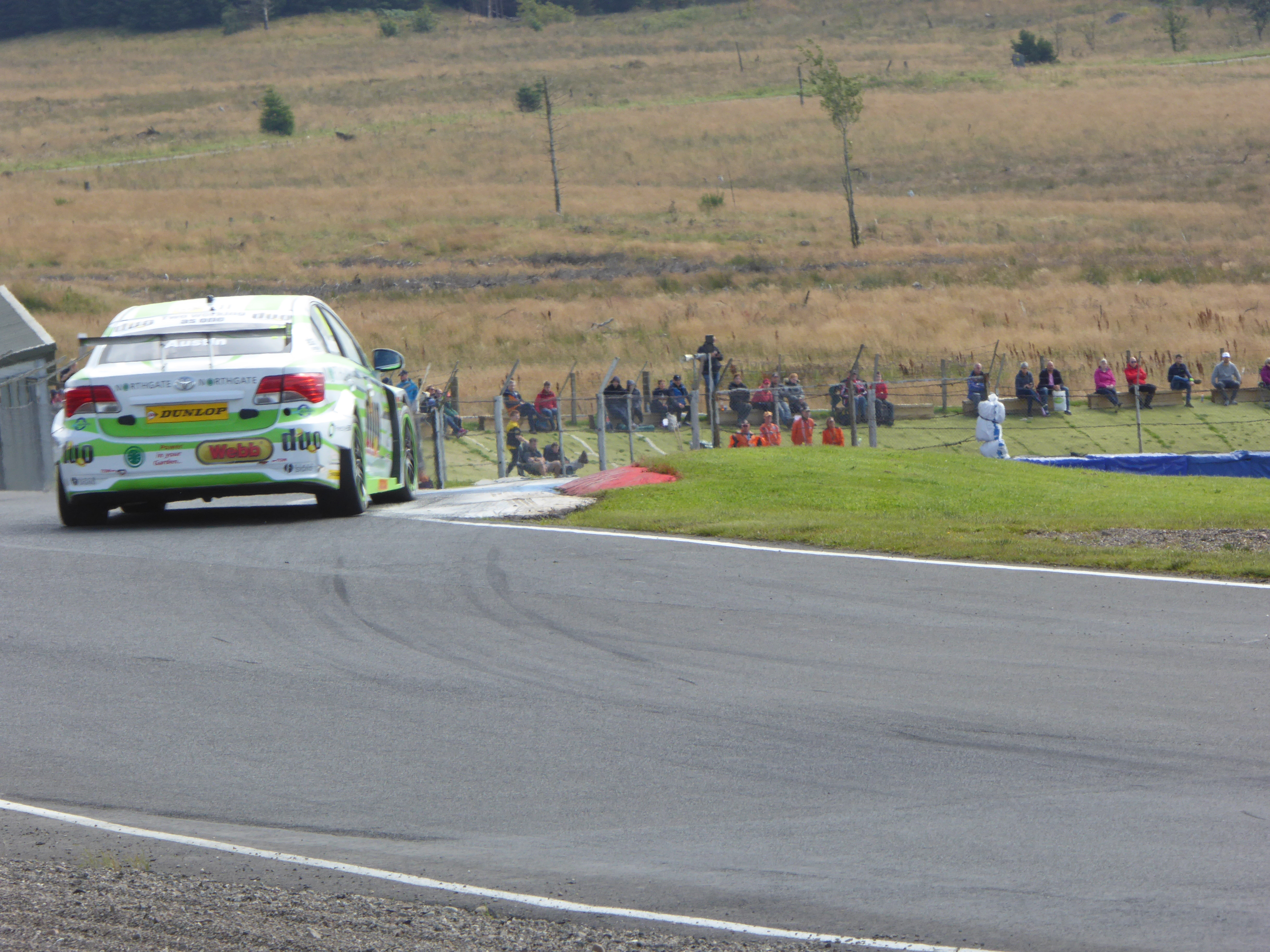
Austin, at the Knockhill round of the 2017 British Touring Car Championship.

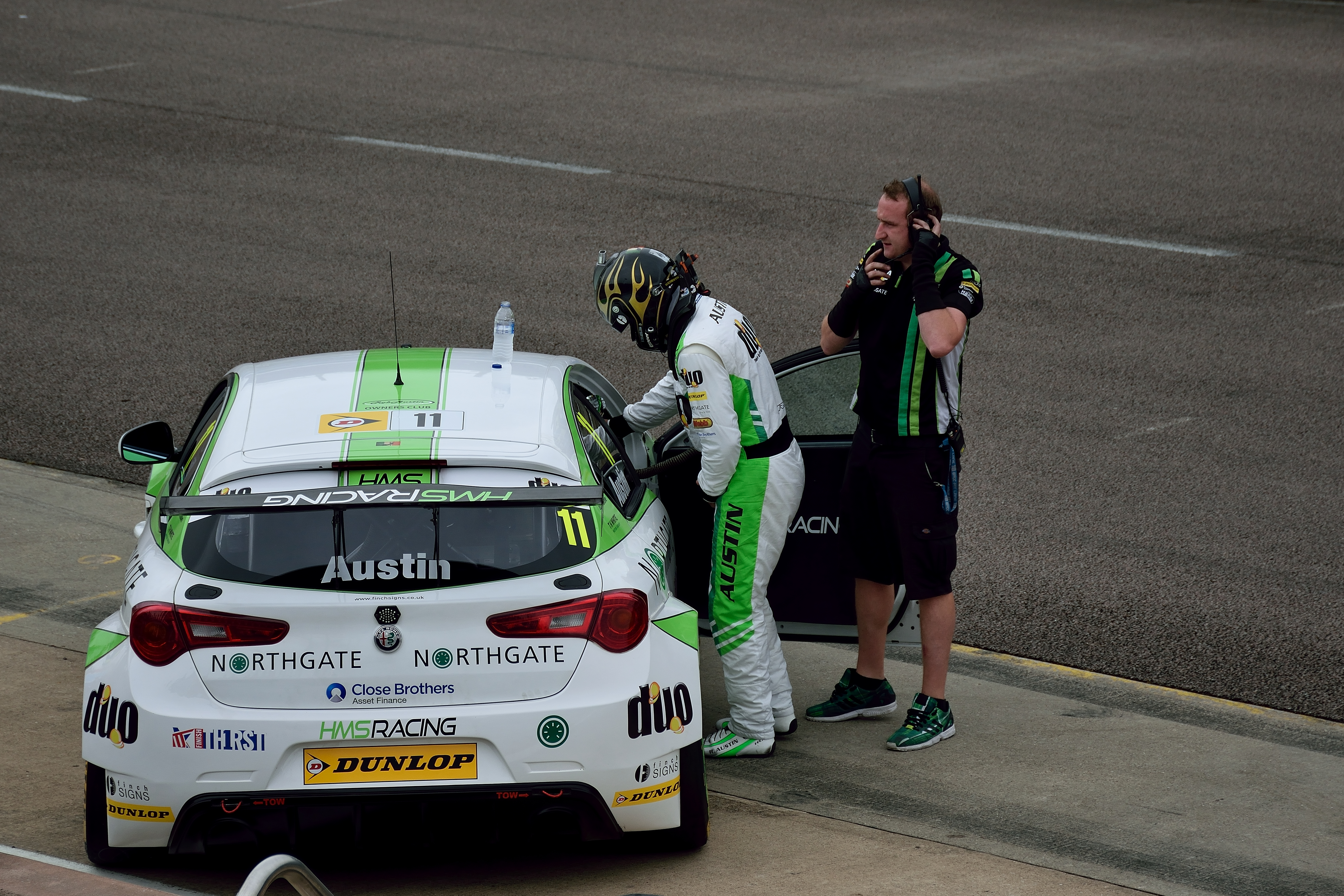
Austin at Rockingham during the 2018 British Touring Car Championship season.

=== Career summary ===
| Season | Series | Team | Races | Wins | Poles | F/Laps | Podiums | Points | Position |
|---|---|---|---|---|---|---|---|---|---|
| 2000 | British Formula 3 Championship | Carlin Motorsport | 1 | 0 | 0 | 0 | 0 | 0 | NC |
| 2001 | British Formula 3 Championship | Alain Menu Racing | 25 | 0 | 0 | 0 | 0 | 8 | 19th |
| 2002 | British Formula 3 Championship | Menu F3 Motorsport | 26 | 0 | 0 | 0 | 1 | 94 | 9th |
| 2003 | British Formula 3 Championship | Menu F3 Motorsport | 16 | 1 | 2 | 0 | 5 | 110 | 7th |
| 2004 | British Formula 3 Championship | Menu F3 Motorsport | 8 | 0 | 0 | 2 | 1 | 32 | 16th |
| 2005 | Formula 3 Euro Series | Team Midland Euroseries | 4 | 0 | 0 | 0 | 0 | 0 | NC |
| 2007 | SEAT Cupra Great Britain R class | Startline Services | 11 | 0 | 0 | 1 | 1 | 60 | 8th |
| 2007 | Ginetta Championship | Rob Austin Racing | 11 | 1 | 0 | 2 | 5 | 168 | 11th |
| 2008 | British GT Championship - GT4 | Rob Austin Racing | 14 | 3 | 2 | 4 | 10 | 80 | **2nd** |
| 2008 | Ginetta G50 Cup | Rob Austin Racing | 4 | 2 | 1 | 1 | 4 | 132 | 14th |
| 2009 | Ginetta G50 Cup | Rob Austin Racing | 6 | 0 | 0 | 0 | 2 | 51 | 19th |
| 2010 | Grand Prix Masters | | 7 | 1 | 1 | 1 | 3 | N/A | N/A |
| 2011 | British Touring Car Championship | Rob Austin Racing | 25 | 0 | 0 | 1 | 1 | 26 | 16th |
| 2012 | British Touring Car Championship | Rob Austin Racing | 22 | 0 | 0 | 0 | 1 | 122 | 13th |
| 2012 | Historic Grand Prix of Monaco - Series F | Surtees | 1 | 0 | 0 | 0 | 0 | N/A | 9th |
| 2013 | British Touring Car Championship | WIX Racing | 29 | 1 | 1 | 2 | 5 | 154 | 11th |
| 2014 | British Touring Car Championship | Exocet Racing | 30 | 1 | 0 | 1 | 4 | 147 | 12th |
| 2015 | British Touring Car Championship | Exocet AlcoSense Racing | 30 | 0 | 0 | 0 | 0 | 120 | 14th |
| 2016 | British Touring Car Championship | Handy Motorsport | 30 | 0 | 0 | 0 | 3 | 129 | 16th |
| 2017 | British Touring Car Championship | Handy Motorsport | 30 | 1 | 1 | 0 | 2 | 174 | 11th |
| 2018 | British Touring Car Championship | DUO Motorsport with HMS Racing | 30 | 0 | 0 | 0 | 2 | 126 | 14th |
| 2020 | British Touring Car Championship | Power Maxed Car Care Racing | 3 | 0 | 0 | 0 | 0 | 13 | 22nd |

=== Complete Formula 3 Euro Series results ===
(key) (Races in bold indicate pole position) (Races in italics indicate fastest lap)

| Year | Entrant | Chassis | Engine | 1 | 2 | 3 | 4 | 5 | 6 | 7 | 8 | 9 | 10 | 11 | 12 | 13 | 14 | 15 | 16 | 17 | 18 | 19 | 20 | DC | Points |
|---|---|---|---|---|---|---|---|---|---|---|---|---|---|---|---|---|---|---|---|---|---|---|---|---|---|
| 2005 | Team Midland Euroseries | Dallara F305/001 | Toyota | HOC; 1 | HOC; 2 | PAU; 1 | PAU; 2 | SPA; 1 | SPA; 2 | MON; 1 | MON; 2 | OSC; 1 | OSC; 2 | NOR; 1 | NOR; 2 | NÜR; 1 | NÜR; 2 | ZAN; 1; 12 | ZAN; 2 Ret | LAU; 1; 21 | LAU; 2 Ret | HOC; 1 | HOC; 2 | NC | 0 |

=== Complete British GT Championship results ===
(key) (Races in bold indicate pole position in class) (Races in italics indicate fastest lap in class)

| Year | Entrant | Car | Class | 1 | 2 | 3 | 4 | 5 | 6 | 7 | 8 | 9 | 10 | 11 | 12 | 13 | 14 | DC | Points |
|---|---|---|---|---|---|---|---|---|---|---|---|---|---|---|---|---|---|---|---|
| 2008 | Rob Austin Racing | Ginetta G50 | GT4 | OUL; 1 DNS | **OUL**; **2** DNS | KNO; 1; 9 | **KNO**; **2** Ret | **ROC**; **1**; 14 | ROC; 2; 10 | SNE; 1; 16 | SNE; 2; 15 | THR; 1; 14 | THR; 2 DSQ | BRH; 1; 12 | BRH; 2; 11 | SIL; 1; 7 | DON; 1; 11 | **2nd** | **80** |

=== Complete British Touring Car Championship results ===
(key) (Races in bold indicate pole position – 1 point awarded in first race) (Races in italics indicate fastest lap – 1 point awarded all races) (* signifies that driver lead race for at least one lap – 1 point given)

| Year | Team | Car | 1 | 2 | 3 | 5 | 5 | 6 | 7 | 8 | 9 | 10 | 11 | 12 | 13 | 14 | 15 | 16 | 17 | 18 | 19 | 20 | 21 | 22 | 23 | 24 | 25 | 26 | 27 | 28 | 29 | 30 | DC | Points |
|---|---|---|---|---|---|---|---|---|---|---|---|---|---|---|---|---|---|---|---|---|---|---|---|---|---|---|---|---|---|---|---|---|---|---|
| 2011 | Rob Austin Racing | Audi A4 | BRH; 1 | BRH; 2 | BRH; 3 | DON; 1 Ret | DON; 2 Ret | DON; 3; 13 | THR; 1 Ret | THR; 2 DNS | THR; 3 DNS | OUL; 1 Ret | OUL; 2; 12 | OUL; 3; 16 | CRO; 1 Ret | CRO; 2 NC | CRO; 3 Ret | SNE; 1; 15 | SNE; 2 Ret | SNE; 3; 10 | KNO; 1 Ret | KNO; 2 Ret | KNO; 3 Ret | ROC; 1; 7 | ROC; 2; 9 | ROC; 3; 2* | BRH; 1; 13 | BRH; 2; 14 | BRH; 3; 13 | SIL; 1 Ret | SIL; 2; 12 | SIL; 3; 6 | 16th | 26 |
| 2012 | Rob Austin Racing | Audi A4 | BRH; 1; 8 | BRH; 2; 5 | BRH; 3; 5 | DON; 1 Ret | DON; 2 DNS | DON; 3 DNS | THR; 1 Ret | THR; 2; 18 | THR; 3; 13 | OUL; 1 | OUL; 2 | OUL; 3 | CRO; 1; 5 | CRO; 2; 3 | CRO; 3; 7 | SNE; 1; 12 | SNE; 2 Ret | SNE; 3 Ret | KNO; 1 | KNO; 2 | KNO; 3 | ROC; 1; 9 | ROC; 2; 16 | ROC; 3; 10 | SIL; 1; 5 | SIL; 2; 5 | SIL; 3 DSQ | BRH; 1; 17 | BRH; 2; 10 | BRH; 3; 7 | 13th | 122 |
| 2013 | WIX Racing | Audi A4 | BRH; 1; 3* | BRH; 2 Ret | BRH; 3 Ret | DON; 1; 14 | DON; 2 Ret | DON; 3 DNS | THR; 1; 19 | THR; 2; 18 | THR; 3 Ret | OUL; 1; 13 | OUL; 2; 8 | OUL; 3; 5* | CRO; 1; 13 | CRO; 2; 14 | CRO; 3; 11 | SNE; 1; 15 | SNE; 2; 14 | SNE; 3; 12 | **KNO**; **1**; 3* | KNO; 2; 2 | KNO; 3; 4 | ROC; 1; 3 | ROC; 2; 1* | ROC; 3; 9 | SIL; 1; 12 | SIL; 2 Ret | SIL; 3; 17 | BRH; 1 Ret | BRH; 2 Ret | BRH; 3; 18 | 11th | 154 |
| 2014 | Exocet Racing | Audi A4 | BRH; 1; 5 | BRH; 2 Ret | BRH; 3; 11 | DON; 1; 29 | DON; 2; 18 | DON; 3 Ret | THR; 1; 17 | THR; 2 DSQ | THR; 3; 12 | OUL; 1; 5 | OUL; 2; 2 | OUL; 3; 5 | CRO; 1; 13 | CRO; 2 Ret | CRO; 3 Ret | SNE; 1; 11 | SNE; 2; 13 | SNE; 3; 18 | KNO; 1; 2 | KNO; 2; 3 | KNO; 3 Ret | ROC; 1; 12 | ROC; 2; 5 | ROC; 3; 1* | SIL; 1; 9 | SIL; 2 Ret | SIL; 3; 18 | BRH; 1 Ret | BRH; 2; 16 | BRH; 3; 15 | 12th | 147 |
| 2015 | Exocet AlcoSense Racing | Audi A4 | BRH; 1; 14 | BRH; 2; 10 | **BRH**; **3**; 5* | DON; 1; 10 | DON; 2; 18 | DON; 3 Ret | THR; 1; 14 | THR; 2; 9 | THR; 3; 17 | OUL; 1; 15 | OUL; 2; 13 | OUL; 3 Ret | CRO; 1; 13 | CRO; 2; 7 | CRO; 3 Ret | SNE; 1; 25 | SNE; 2; 9 | SNE; 3; 8 | KNO; 1; 7 | KNO; 2; 6 | KNO; 3; 5 | ROC; 1; 19 | ROC; 2; 6 | ROC; 3; 7 | SIL; 1; 11 | SIL; 2 NC | SIL; 3; 17 | BRH; 1; 18 | BRH; 2 Ret | BRH; 3 Ret | 14th | 120 |
| 2016 | Handy Motorsport | Toyota Avensis | BRH; 1 Ret | BRH; 2; 14 | BRH; 3; 11 | DON; 1; 18 | DON; 2; 10 | DON; 3; 8 | THR; 1; 14 | THR; 2; 10 | THR; 3; 7 | OUL; 1; 15 | OUL; 2 Ret | OUL; 3; 16 | CRO; 1; 11 | CRO; 2; 12 | CRO; 3; 12 | SNE; 1; 13 | SNE; 2; 9 | SNE; 3; 3 | KNO; 1; 10 | KNO; 2; 12 | KNO; 3; 7 | ROC; 1; 20 | ROC; 2; 14 | ROC; 3 Ret | SIL; 1; 3 | SIL; 2 Ret | SIL; 3 Ret | BRH; 1; 2 | BRH; 2 Ret | BRH; 3; 14 | 16th | 129 |
| 2017 | Handy Motorsport | Toyota Avensis | BRH; 1; 5 | BRH; 2 DSQ | BRH; 3; 18 | **DON**; **1**; 3 | DON; 2 Ret | DON; 3; 13 | THR; 1; 9 | THR; 2; 5 | THR; 3; 5 | OUL; 1; 9 | OUL; 2; 8 | OUL; 3; 7 | CRO; 1; 11 | CRO; 2; 8 | CRO; 3; 4 | SNE; 1 Ret | SNE; 2; 15 | SNE; 3 Ret | KNO; 1; 23 | KNO; 2 Ret | KNO; 3; 20 | ROC; 1; 31 | ROC; 2; 26 | ROC; 3 Ret | SIL; 1; 9 | SIL; 2; 5 | SIL; 3; 5 | BRH; 1; 9 | BRH; 2; 9 | BRH; 3; 1* | 11th | 174 |
| 2018 | DUO Motorsport with HMS Racing | Alfa Romeo Giulietta | BRH; 1 Ret | BRH; 2; 6 | **BRH**; **3**; 3* | DON; 1; 15 | DON; 2; 21 | DON; 3; 11 | THR; 1; 16 | THR; 2; 13 | THR; 3; 16 | OUL; 1; 10 | OUL; 2; 7 | **OUL**; **3** Ret | CRO; 1 Ret | CRO; 2; 15 | CRO; 3 Ret | SNE; 1; 6 | SNE; 2 Ret | SNE; 3; 13 | ROC; 1; 11 | ROC; 2 Ret | ROC; 3; 18 | KNO; 1; 14 | KNO; 2; 9 | KNO; 3; 13 | SIL; 1; 26 | SIL; 2; 9 | SIL; 3; 5 | BRH; 1; 15 | BRH; 2; 9 | BRH; 3; 3* | 14th | 126 |
| 2020 | Power Maxed Car Care Racing | Vauxhall Astra | DON; 1 | DON; 2 | DON; 3 | BRH; 1 | BRH; 2 | BRH; 3 | OUL; 1 | OUL; 2 | OUL; 3 | KNO; 1 | KNO; 2 | KNO; 3 | THR; 1; 12 | THR; 2; 12 | THR; 3; 11 | SIL; 1 | SIL; 2 | SIL; 3 | CRO; 1 | CRO; 2 | CRO; 3 | SNE; 1 | SNE; 2 | SNE; 3 | BRH; 1 | BRH; 2 | BRH; 3 | | | | 22nd | 13 |
