= 2008 Ginetta G50 Cup =

Motor racing competition

Seasons
- ← none 2009 →

The 2008 Ginetta G50 Cup was the inaugural Ginetta G50 Cup season. The season began at Oulton Park on 24 March and finished after 20 races over 10 rounds at Donington Park on 12 October, supporting rounds of the British Formula 3 Championship and British GT Championship.

Nigel Moore dominated the first year of the series, winning 14 races and finishing the season over 200 points ahead of runner up Frank Wrathall.

== Teams and drivers ==
Team	No.	Drivers	Rounds
Tockwith Motorsport	1	(United Kingdom) Nigel Moore	9-10
Tockwith Motorsport	25	(United Kingdom) Nigel Moore	1-8
IDL	2	(United Kingdom) Paul O'Neill	1-3
IDL	7	(United Kingdom) Alan Bonner	3
IDL	10	(United Kingdom) Tom Sharp	All
Xero	3	(United Kingdom) Phil Keen	2
Xero	33	(United Kingdom) Toby Newton	All
Xero	34	(United Kingdom) Chris Clayton	4-6, 8, 10
Rob Austin Racing	4	(United Kingdom) Rod Carman	1-8, 10
Rob Austin Racing	6	(United Kingdom) Richard Austin	1-5, 9
Rob Austin Racing	6	(United Kingdom) Rob Austin	6
Rob Austin Racing	6	(United Kingdom) Hunter Abbott	7
Rob Austin Racing	6	(United Kingdom) Henry Fletcher	8
Rob Austin Racing	7	(United Kingdom) Rob Austin	4
Team GCR	5	(United Kingdom) Tom Dunstan	All
Privateer	6	(United Kingdom) Phil Broad	10
Colards	7	(Sweden) Hampus Rydman	10
Colards	97	(Sweden) Hampus Rydman	7
Colards	28	(Italy) Michele Tommasi	1-7, 10
Colards	29	(United Kingdom) Clive Richards	1-4, 8-9
Colards	50	(United Kingdom) Richard Dean	6
Colards	59	(United Kingdom) Glenn Denny	5
Colards	69	(United Kingdom) Clive Coote	1-2, 4-5, 7
Privateer	12	(United Kingdom) Mark Proctor	9-10
Privateer	13	(United Kingdom) Mike Simpson	9
Speedworks Motorsport	19	(United Kingdom) Christian Dick	All
Speedworks Motorsport	20	(United Kingdom) Tony Hughes	2-10
Speedworks Motorsport	21	(United Kingdom) Richard Sykes	All
Ben Elliot	27	(United Kingdom) Ben Elliot	1-5
IN2RACING	40	(United Kingdom) Fiona James	1, 7
Tranzpower	47	(United Kingdom) Jonathan Cook	1-5, 8-10
Privateer	58	(United Kingdom) Mike Robinson	8
Dynojet/Will Hoy Scholarship	66	(United Kingdom) Frank Wrathall	All
David Dove Racing	70	(United Kingdom) David Dove	1-3, 5-7
MANN Autoservices Racing	74	(United Kingdom) Chris Dittmann	8, 10
Privateer	75	(Denmark) Joachim Ritter	9-10
W2 Racing	99	(United Kingdom) Andrew Hepworth	1
Hepworth International	99	(United Kingdom) Stephen Hepworth	7

== Calendar ==
All rounds were held in the United Kingdom.

Round		Circuit	Date	Pole position	Fastest lap	Winning driver	Winning team
1	R1	Oulton Park, Cheshire	24 March	(United Kingdom) Nigel Moore	(United Kingdom) Nigel Moore	(United Kingdom) Nigel Moore	Tockwith Motorsport
1	R2	Oulton Park, Cheshire	24 March	(United Kingdom) Nigel Moore	(United Kingdom) Clive Richards	(United Kingdom) Nigel Moore	Tockwith Motorsport
2	R3	Cadwell Park, Lincolnshire	6 April	(United Kingdom) Nigel Moore	(United Kingdom) Nigel Moore	(United Kingdom) Nigel Moore	Tockwith Motorsport
2	R4	Cadwell Park, Lincolnshire	6 April	(United Kingdom) Nigel Moore	(United Kingdom) Nigel Moore	(United Kingdom) Nigel Moore	Tockwith Motorsport
3	R5	Knockhill Racing Circuit, Fife	13 April	(United Kingdom) Nigel Moore	(United Kingdom) Christian Dick	(United Kingdom) Nigel Moore	Tockwith Motorsport
3	R6	Knockhill Racing Circuit, Fife	13 April	(United Kingdom) Nigel Moore	(United Kingdom) Richard Austin	(United Kingdom) Nigel Moore	Tockwith Motorsport
4	R7	Croft Circuit, North Yorkshire	27 April	(United Kingdom) Nigel Moore	(United Kingdom) Ben Elliot	(United Kingdom) Nigel Moore	Tockwith Motorsport
4	R8	Croft Circuit, North Yorkshire	27 April	(United Kingdom) Nigel Moore	(United Kingdom) Rob Austin	(United Kingdom) Rob Austin	Rob Austin Racing
5	R9	Snetterton Motor Racing Circuit, Norfolk	8 June	(United Kingdom) Nigel Moore	(United Kingdom) Toby Newton	(United Kingdom) Nigel Moore	Tockwith Motorsport
5	R10	Snetterton Motor Racing Circuit, Norfolk	8 June	(United Kingdom) Frank Wrathall	(United Kingdom) Nigel Moore	(United Kingdom) Nigel Moore	Tockwith Motorsport
6	R11	Thruxton Circuit, Hampshire	29 June	(United Kingdom) Rob Austin	(United Kingdom) Nigel Moore	(United Kingdom) Rob Austin	Rob Austin Racing
6	R12	Thruxton Circuit, Hampshire	29 June	(United Kingdom) Nigel Moore	(United Kingdom) Nigel Moore	(United Kingdom) Nigel Moore	Tockwith Motorsport
7	R13	Brands Hatch (GP), Kent	13 July	(United Kingdom) Hunter Abbott	(United Kingdom) Nigel Moore	(United Kingdom) Nigel Moore	Tockwith Motorsport
7	R14	Brands Hatch (GP), Kent	13 July	(United Kingdom) Hunter Abbott	(United Kingdom) Christian Dick	(United Kingdom) Hunter Abbott	Rob Austin Racing
8	R15	Silverstone Circuit, Northamptonshire	17 August	(United Kingdom) Chris Dittman	(United Kingdom) Nigel Moore	(United Kingdom) Nigel Moore	Tockwith Motorsport
8	R16	Silverstone Circuit, Northamptonshire	17 August	(United Kingdom) Tom Dunstan	(United Kingdom) Frank Wrathall	(United Kingdom) Christian Dick	Speedworks Motorsport
9	R17	Mallory Park, Leicestershire	7 September	(United Kingdom) Toby Newton	(United Kingdom) Toby Newton	(United Kingdom) Nigel Moore	Tockwith Motorsport
9	R18	Mallory Park, Leicestershire	7 September	(United Kingdom) Toby Newton	(United Kingdom) Frank Wrathall	(United Kingdom) Frank Wrathall	Dynojet
10	R19	Donington Park, Leicestershire	12 October	(United Kingdom) Nigel Moore	(United Kingdom) Tom Dunstan	(United Kingdom) Toby Newton	Xero
10	R20	Donington Park, Leicestershire	12 October	(United Kingdom) Nigel Moore	(United Kingdom) Christian Dick	(United Kingdom) Nigel Moore	Tockwith Motorsport

== Championship standings ==
Points system
1st	2nd	3rd	4th	5th	6th	7th	8th	9th	10th	11th	12th	13th	14th	15th	16th	17th	18th	19th	20th	Pole position	Fastest lap
35	30	26	22	20	18	16	14	12	11	10	9	8	7	6	5	4	3	2	1	1	1

(key)

Pos	Driver	OUL		CAD		KNO		CRO		SNE		THR		BHGP		SIL		MAL		DON		Pts
1	(United Kingdom) Nigel Moore	1	1	1	1	1	1	1	3	1	1	2	1	1	DNS	1	2	1	Ret	2	1	626
2	(United Kingdom) Frank Wrathall	6	6	Ret	6	2	2	3	13	4	4	4	13	4	2	5	3	4	1	4	2	424
3	(United Kingdom) Christian Dick	10	2	Ret	5	6	8	Ret	Ret	2	2	3	Ret	5	3	3	1	3	3	3	Ret	367
4	(United Kingdom) Toby Newton	9	4	8	13	DNS	DNS	9	7	3	3	5	7	3	5	9	4	2	2	1	Ret	351
5	(United Kingdom) Tom Dunstan	5	9	5	8	DNS	DNS	11	5	5	10	6	3	2	4	4	Ret	5	6	8	3	325
6	(United Kingdom) Tom Sharp	4	7	7	15	5	6	5	Ret	7	5	Ret	6	8	7	2	7	6	8	7	4	318
7	(United Kingdom) Clive Richards	8	5	4	3	3	3	6	4							Ret	5	7	5			231
8	(United Kingdom) Richard Sykes	14	11	13	12	DNS	DNS	13	10	13	11	10	9	11	11	11	9	11	9	11	7	184
9	(United Kingdom) Rod Carman	3	8	12	11	DNS	9	7	6	DSQ	DNS	7	8	7	9	Ret	DNS			Ret	12	172
10	(United Kingdom) Jonathan Cook	13	17	6	7	8	5	8	Ret	DSQ	DNS					10	10	9	10	15	6	163
11	(Italy) Michele Tommasi	16	13	10	14	DNS	DNS	Ret	12	9	7	8	5	6	6					Ret	5	158
12	(United Kingdom) Ben Elliot	2	Ret	Ret	DNS	4	4	4	2	8	Ret											141
13	(United Kingdom) Tony Hughes			14	17	10	12	14	14	14	12	11	12	13	12	12	Ret	12	11	13	13	141
14	(United Kingdom) Rob Austin							2	1			1	2									132
15	(United Kingdom) Richard Austin	7	10	11	10	7	10	10	8	Ret	9							Ret	7			129
16	(United Kingdom) David Dove	12	14	DNS	16	9	11			11	13	12	11	12	Ret	13	11					107
17	(United Kingdom) Chris Clayton							12	11	12	8	Ret	10			7	8			5	Ret	103
18	(United Kingdom) Paul O'Neill	Ret	3	3	4	11	7															100
19	(United Kingdom) Clive Coote	11	12	9	9			Ret	9	10	Ret			10	10							88
20	(United Kingdom) Phil Keen			2	2																	60
21	(United Kingdom) Hunter Abbott													Ret	1							37
22	(United Kingdom) Glenn Denny									6	6											36
23	(United Kingdom) Mike Simpson																	8	4			36
24	(United Kingdom) Henry Fletcher															6	6					36
25	(Sweden) Hampus Rydman													9	8					6	8	32
26	(United Kingdom) Mark Proctor																	10	Ret	12	11	30
27	(United Kingdom) Fiona James	15	15											14	13							27
28	(United Kingdom) Phil Broad																			10	9	23
29	(Denmark) Joachim Ritter																	Ret	DNS	14	10	18
30	(United Kingdom) Chris Dittman															Ret	Ret			9	Ret	13
31	(United Kingdom) Stephen Hepworth													15	Ret							6
32	(United Kingdom) Andrew Hepworth	Ret	16																			5
-	(United Kingdom) Alan Bonner					Ret	DSQ															0
guest drivers ineligible for points
-	(United Kingdom) Richard Dean											9	4									0
-	(United Kingdom) Mike Robinson															8	DNS					0
Pos	Driver	OUL		CAD		KNO		CRO		SNE		THR		BHGP		SIL		MAL		DON		Pts
