= AlcoSense =

Alcohol breathalyser brand

- Trade name: AlcoSense Laboratories
- Company type: Privately held company
- Industry: Alcohol testing solutions, Breathalysers
- Founded: Maidenhead, UK (September 1, 2007)
- Founder: Hunter Abbott
- Headquarters: Maidenhead, UK
- Products: AlcoSense Lite, AlcoSense Elite, AlcoSense Excel, AlcoSense Pro, AlcoSense Ultra, AlcoSense Singles, AlcoSense Singles NF
- Parent: Now Group UK Ltd
- Website: AlcoSense.co.uk

AlcoSense is both a company and brand name for alcohol breathalysers.

The company was founded in the UK in 2007 and manufactures and distributes breathalysers for consumers and businesses. It is part of Now Group UK Ltd, which is owned and operated by racing driver and entrepreneur Hunter Abbott.

AlcoSense has won multiple awards for its products and its efforts to improve road safety in the UK. Among these are Brake's Road Safety Awards, What Car? Magazine's Best breathalyser recommendations, Auto Express Best Buy and Recommended Awards and the 2011 Sunday Times Top 100 Tech List.

In June 2014, AlcoSense founder Hunter Abbott was awarded the Brake's Kevin Storey Award for Outstanding Commitment to Road Safety.

In March 2016 the AlcoSense Pro and AlcoSense Ultra were awarded the prestigious Red Dot Design award, an international distinction for excellent product design. In the Same year the AlcoSense Excel was awarded Auto Express Best Buy Award and the AlcoSense Pro was awarded Auto Express Recommended Awards.

The AlcoSense Excel won the 2018 German Design Awards for excellent product design in the Medical, Rehabilitation and Health Care category.

== Products ==
AlcoSense consumer products include a range of reusable battery operated breathalysers and a single-use disposable breathalyser, launched in 2012.

In July 2012 it became a legal requirement in France to carry a breathalyser in all vehicles. AlcoSense launched a disposable breathalyser specifically for use in France: the AlcoSense Singles NF, certified to meet all French specifications.

In 2015 AlcoSense launched the AlcoSense Pro and in 2016 the AlcoSense Ultra and Excel. Both use fuel cell sensors. The AlcoSense Ultra uses the same fuel-cell sensor as several police breathalysers, the Pro and Excel use a smaller version of the same sensor. They contain a number of unique new features that advise the user if they are blowing correctly, provided an estimated time until sober, and they can work with any drink-drive limit anywhere in the world. By selecting a country from a pre-loaded list, the unit will automatically set itself up to the local drink-drive limit.

== Corporate ownership ==
AlcoSense is a trademark of Now Group UK Ltd, owned and operated by the racing driver and entrepreneur, Hunter Abbott.

== Awards and recommendations ==
AlcoSense has won several awards and recommendations for its products.

- 2018 German Design Award for Excellent Product Design - AlcoSense Excel
- 2017 Auto Express Best Buy (group test winner) AlcoSense Excel
- 2017 Auto Express Recommended (group test runner up) AlcoSense Pro
- 2016 the AlcoSense Pro and AlcoSense Ultra was awarded the Red Dot design award.
- 2015 both the Sunday Times Driving section and the Daily Telegraph Lifestyle section reviewed and recommended the AlcoSense Pro
- 2014 AlcoSense Managing Director Hunter Abbott was awarded the Brake charity's Kevin Storey Award for Outstanding Commitment to Road Safety.
- 2013 ITV's This Morning: AlcoSense was recommended by Dr Chris Steele, resident show Doctor
- 2012 Channel 5 Fifth Gear: the AlcoSense Elite was the only breathalyser to match the readings for the police breathalyser and reviewed as “Incredibly accurate”
- 2011 What Car? Magazine Best breathalyser under £100 – AlcoSense Elite
- 2011 What Car? Best breathalyser under £40 – AlcoSense Lite

== Endorsements ==
AlcoSense products have also been endorsed by former Formula One racing driver Stirling Moss.

== British Touring Car Championship ==
In June 2014 AlcoSense was selected as the Official Alcohol Testing Partner for the Dunlop MSA British Touring Car Championship. The BTCC is the first major racing series to introduce mandatory testing for drivers and senior officials.

== Partnerships ==
AlcoSense has working partnerships with a number of automotive institutions, including:

- The Automobile Association (AA)
- RAC Ltd
- Institute of Advanced Motorists (IAM)
- the leading road safety charity Brake
- Transport Research Laboratory (TRL)
- Direct Line.
- Honda UK
