= Hunter Abbott =

British racing driver and businessman (Born 1980)

- Nationality: (United Kingdom) British
- Born: Hunter David Abbott; 4 December 1980 (age 45) Windsor, Berkshire, England

VLN career
- Debut season: 2017
- Current team: Walkenhorst Motorsport
- Categorisation: FIA Bronze (until 2017, 2020–); FIA Silver (2018–2019)
- Car number: 35
- Former teams: GruppeM Motorsport
- Starts: 15
- Wins: 0
- Poles: 0
- Fastest laps: 0
- Best finish: 3rd in 2018

Previous series
- 2004 2005 2006 2007 2008 2009 2010-11 2012 2013 2014-15 2016 2017: Radical SR3 Championship; SCSA; British GT Championship (GTC); SCSA; British GT Championship (GT4); British GT Championship (GT4) & GT4 European Series; Did not race Ginetta GT Supercup; Porsche GT3 Cup Challenge Benelux; British Touring Car Championship; British Touring Car Championship, 24H Series (GT4) & British GT Championship (GT3); Blancpain GT Series Asia, VLN & Blancpain GT Series Endurance Cup

Championship titles
- 1995 2005 2007 2008 2013 2017 2021: HKC Junior TKM Champion; SCSA Rookie Champion; SCSA Vice-Champion; British GT Vice-Champion; Porsche Cup Challenge Benelux Vice-Champion; Blancpain GT Series Asia Pro-AM & Overall GT3 Champion; Silverstone 500 (RAC Trophy)

Awards
- 2005 2005 2017: Roush Driver of the Year; Autosport One to Watch; AMG Wall of Champions

Hunter David Abbott (born 4 December 1980 in Windsor, Berkshire) is a British racing driver, businessman and inventor. He has raced sportscars, GT cars and Touring Cars. He was 2017 Blancpain GT Series Asia Champion and won the RAC Trophy after victory in the 2021 Silverstone 500 race.

Abbott is founder, owner and managing director of AlcoSense Laboratories, which designs, develops and manufactures alcohol breathalysers under the AlcoSense brand name. Abbott holds several Patents in the field of breath alcohol analysis and is a member of the Parliamentary Advisory Council for Transport Safety as an expert in breath alcohol analysis.

In 2017, Abbott was awarded a "Gold Star" on the Wall of Champions at the Mercedes-AMG factory in Affalterbach, Germany, as a result of winning the 2017 Blancpain GT Series Asia championship while driving a Mercedes-AMG GT GT3 race car for GruppeM Motorsport, an AMG Performance racing team.

In 2018, Abbott was enrolled as a member of the BRDC as a result of his motor racing successes in the UK and abroad.

== Racing career ==
=== Early years ===
Abbott began his racing career in 1995, in karting, winning the HKC Junior TKM Championship during his first year racing. He moved to Senior TKM competing in the 1996 Super 1 National Kart Championships finishing 15th overall on his debut year. For 1998, Abbott moved to Formula 100C Super 1 National Kart Championships where he finished the season fourth overall and ran as high as second in the European Intercontinental A Championships. In 1999, Abbott moved to Formula A and competed in the Super 1 National Kart Championships.

Abbott did not race between 2000 and March 2003 due to lack of funding. In 2003, Abbott competed in a handful of Radical Enduro championship races driving a Radical Prosport and had several podium finishes.

For 2004, Abbott raced in the Radical Enduro championship with Martin Donnelly Racing partnering Nigel Redwood. He missed the first two rounds of the championship but took eight victories and 11 pole positions in the remainder of the season, the most races any driver has ever won in one season of Radical Enduro.

=== Oval Racing ===
In 2005, Abbott moved into the UK Oval Racing, joining the SCSA racing series in the RyanAir sponsored car run by Torquespeed Racing. SCSA was a UK based championship, similar to the NASCAR Sprint Cup Series which raced on the Rockingham Motor Speedway oval circuit. He had a successful debut season, winning the Rookie Championship. This led to him being awarded 'One to Watch' by Autosport Magazine and "Driver of the Year" by NASCAR team Roush Racing.

Abbott didn't compete in the 2006 season, instead competing in British GT, but returned in 2007 and finished runner-up to series champion Colin White.

=== 24 Hour Racing ===
After a last minute call up from CWS Racing, Abbott competed in the 2016 Dubai 24 Hour, finishing second in the SP3 class driving a Ginetta G55 GT4. The team had led the race until three hours from the end when a belt failure forced the car into the pits for an additional pit-stop.

=== GT racing ===
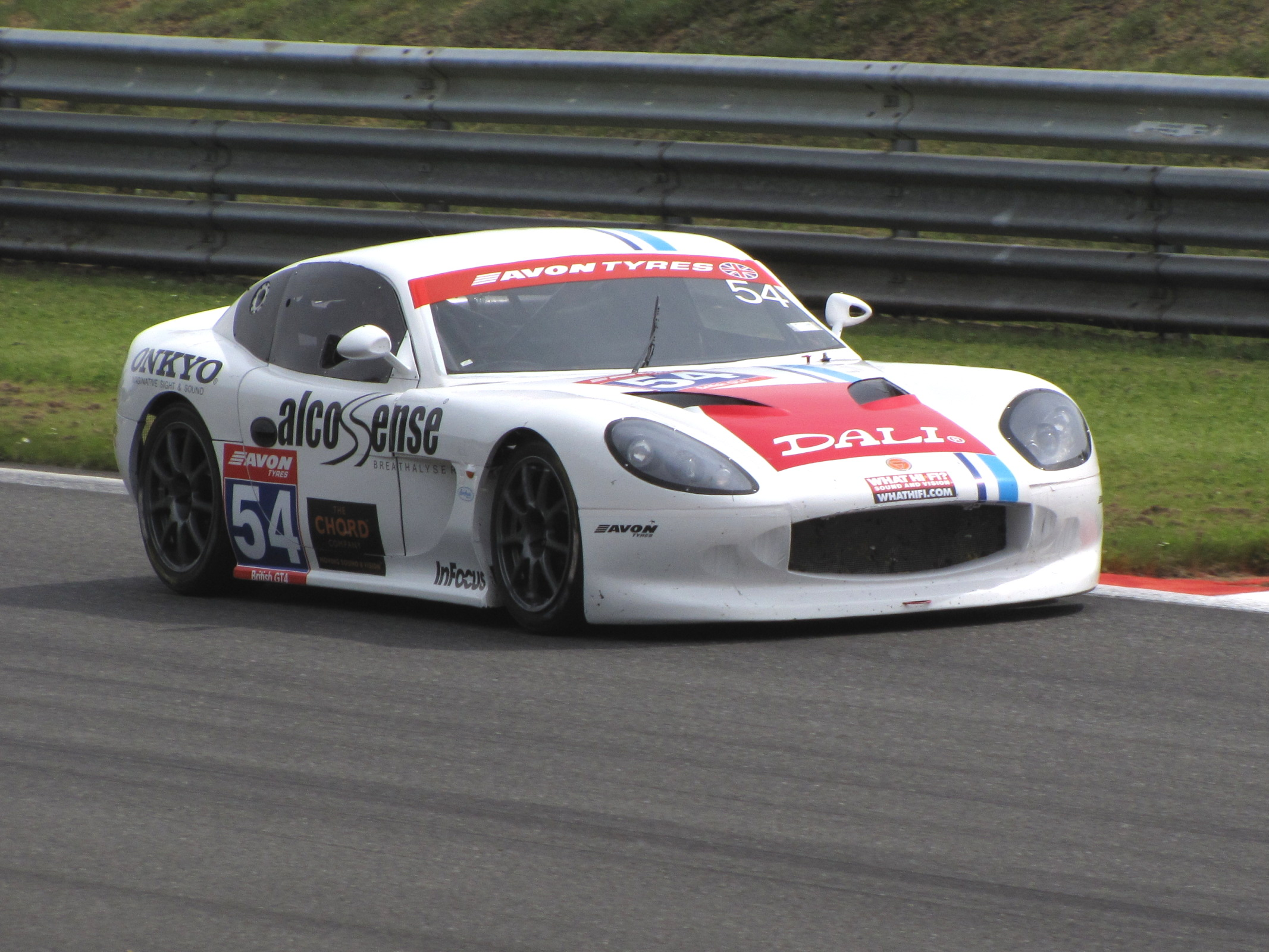
Abbott driving for Rob Austin Racing at Circuit de Spa-Francorchamps in the 2009 British GT season.

2006 saw a move into GT racing for Abbott. He entered the 2006 British GT season, driving in the GTC class with a Porsche 996 GT3 racing for RPM Motorsport. The highlight of the year was finishing second in the Pau Grand Prix. After the Snetterton round of the championship, Abbott left RPM and joined Paul Mace's Specialist Direct team also driving a Porsche 996 GT3.

After a brief hiatus in 2007, when he returned to Oval racing, he once again joined the British GT grid, beginning a long racing partnership with Rob Austin Racing. Partnering Rob Austin in the teams Ginetta G50, the pair managed to finish second in the GT4 class of the 2008 season, taking three class wins. At the Oulton Park round of the championship, Abbott had a spectacular 100mph crash in his Ginetta, flipping several time before coming to rest on its roof where it burst into flames. Abbott was trapped in the car for 18 seconds while on fire. The driver's door was jammed shut and he escaped from the car by crawling through the roll cage and out of the passenger side of the car. Quick thinking by Abbott and efficient work by the race marshals meant that he escaped with only minor burns and injuries. After 2 weeks Abbott returned to the series and took a double victory at Knockhill.

The partnership with Rob Austin Racing continued into 2009. Abbott contested the first half of the 2009 season, with Abbott taking four class wins and several podium finishes along with new partner Gary Simms before stopping before the Knockhill event. Abbott had a one-off outing after a late call from Stark Racing for the Snetterton round of the championship where he scored two-second places in the GT4 class. He finished fourth in the GT4 championship after missing the second half of the season. However, Abbott, with Rob Austin Racing and driver partner Henry Fletcher contested a full season in the GT4 European Series. Abbott and Fletcher finish sixth in the 2009 championship, with three third-place finishes. Abbott continued into the 2010 GT4 European Cup, entering the first three rounds and scoring one 2nd place and finishing fifth in the overall drivers standings.

In 2016, Abbott made a one-off appearance in the Spa-Francorchamps round of the British GT Championship. He drove for Grasser Racing driving a Lamborghini Huracan GT3 car, qualifying second and leading the race until retirement due to technical reasons on the final lap.

For 2017, Abbott returned to GT racing in three series. He won the overall GT3 title and Pro-AM GT3 title in the Blancpain GT Series Asia driving for GruppeM Racing sponsored by Pagani Cars China and GruppeM in a Mercedes-AMG GT GT3. He also raced in selected VLN races in a BMW 235 Cup Car for Walkenhorst Motorsport taking a best place of third. Abbott drove for HTP Motorsport at the 2017 Silverstone round of the Blancpain GT Series Endurance Cup, standing in for injured Michael Avenatti, finishing fourth in class and at the Barcelona event of the same championship for Barwell Motorsport driving a Lamborghini Huracan GT3 where he won his class partnering Patrick Kujala and Martin Kodrić, standing in for injured Adrian Amstutz.

In 2018, Abbott joined Walkenhorst Motorsport driving a PlayStation sponsored BMW M6 GT3 in VLN, partnered with Jonathan Hirschi, Christian Krognes and Jordan Tressonn. Their best finish was third overall at VLN 7.

In 2019, Abbott raced again for Walkenhorst Motorsport driving the sister BMW M6 GT3 car sponsored by Total in VLN, partnered with a range of drivers including Henry Walkenhorst, Andreas Ziegler, Rudi Adams and Jordan Tresson

In 2020, Abbott competed in the opening round of the European Le Mans Series at Circuit Paul Ricard with JMW Motorsport driving a Ferrari 488 GTE, finishing fourth. Abbott did not race for the remainder of the season citing concerns around travelling during the COVID-19 pandemic.

As COVID-19 restrictions eased, Abbott joined 2 Seas Motorsport for the 10th edition of the Silverstone 500 in 2021, driving an AMG GT GT3 Evo with Martin Kodric. Abbott qualified on pole position, as did Kodric, and took a lights to flag victory, lifting the 1932 RAC Trophy in the process.

=== One-Make Racing ===
In 2008, Abbott made a one-off appearance in the Ginetta G50 Cup at the Brands Hatch GP after one of the Rob Austin Racing drivers was delayed after returning from a US trip. Having never driven the car before, Abbott went straight into qualifying and claimed two pole positions for race 1 and race 2. Abbott did not finish race 1 after contact with Tom Dunstone but won race 2 from Frank Wrathall and Christian Dick.

Abbott entered the 2012 Ginetta GT Supercup, driving a Ginetta G55 for Century Motorsport sponsored by Armour Electronics and Outback BBQs. Abbott finished sixth overall, with two third places his best results.

For 2013, Abbott moved back into Europe, entering the Porsche GT3 Cup Challenge Benelux, driving a Porsche 997 GT3 Cup Gen 2 sponsored by Petronas Oil, Armour Electronics and Outback's BBQs. He finished the season in second place behind former Midland F1 test driver Jeffrey van Hooydonk and ahead of factory Audi driver Christiaan Frankenhout.

=== Touring Car Racing ===
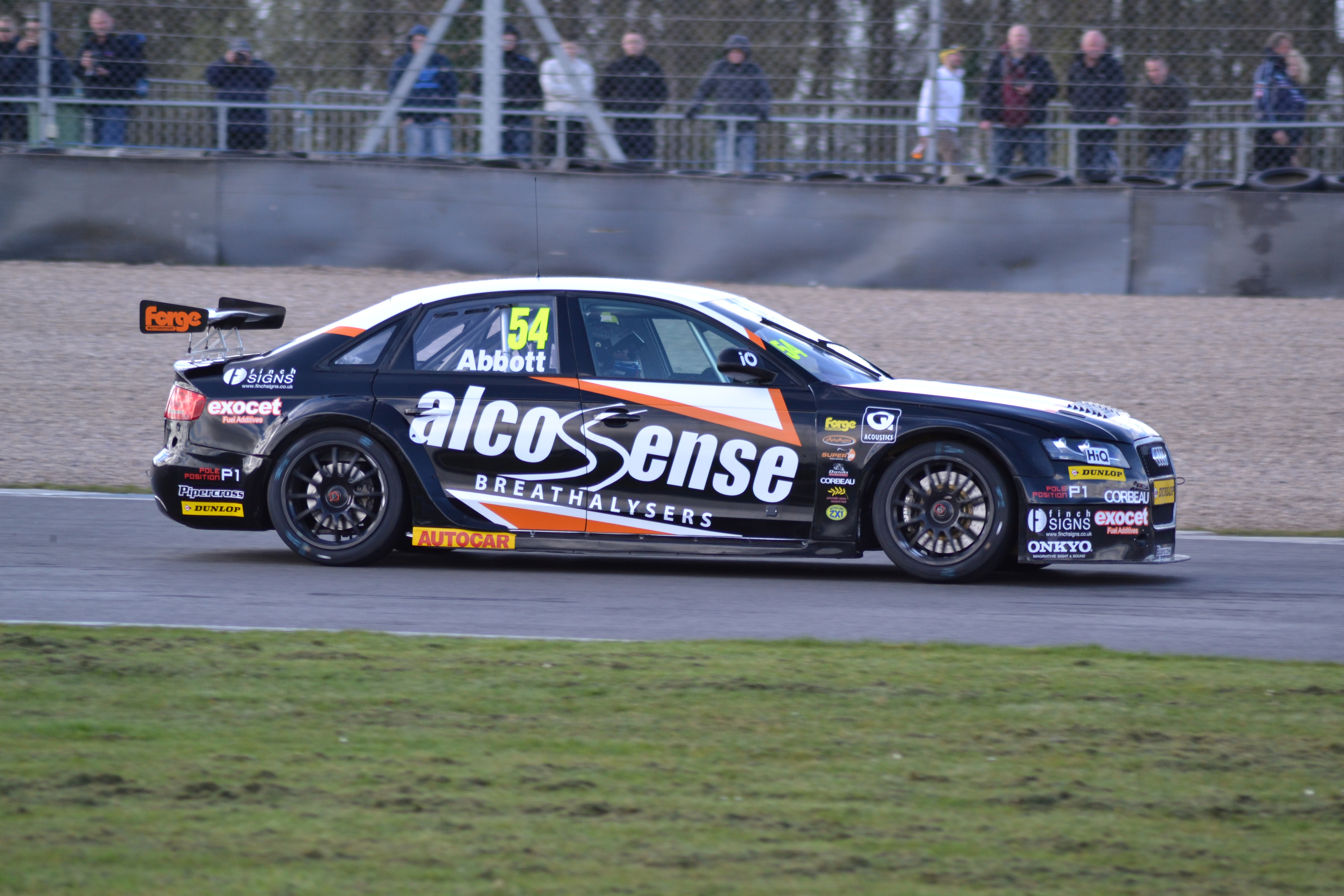
Abbott driving the Rob Austin Racing Audi A4 at Donington Park during the 2014 British Touring Car Championship season.

Abbott announced that he was making the switch to touring car racing, entering the British Touring Car Championship with his previous GT team Rob Austin Racing. He entered the 2014 British Touring Car Championship season with Rob Austin Racing, driving a NGTC Audi A4. Abbott scored points on his debut, securing a single point by finishing 15th during race 3 at Brands Hatch. He featured in the top-ten at several races and was top Rookie in the Jack Sears Trophy with 96 overtakes, awarded to the driver who overtook the most cars during the season.

In 2015, Abbott stayed with Rob Austin Racing in the British Touring Car Championship under the Exocet Racing banner with title sponsorship from Exocet Fuel Additives. Abbott again featured in the top 10 in many races but after missing the Knockhill round of the championship to be there for the birth of his son, Hunter finished the year 21st in the Drivers Championship.

For 2016, Abbott switched to the front wheel drive Chevrolet Cruze of Power Maxed Racing in the British Touring Car Championship with title sponsorship from Power Maxed, a company making car polishes and accessories. Despite top-five qualifying results and a fastest lap at Snetterton, Abbott's best result was tenth at Silverstone, Abbott finished 19th overall in the championship standings.

=== Lap Records ===
Abbott holds or has held lap records at the following circuits:

2000 - Brands Hatch Indy Circuit in Formula First

2008 - Zolder in GT4

2008 - Donington Park in GT4

2009 - Spa Francorchamps in GT4

== Famous crashes ==
On Saturday 22 March 2008, Abbott had a spectacular 100+mph crash in the Rob Austin Racing Ginetta G50 in the opening round of the 2008 British GT Championship at Oulton Park. After being tagged by Peter Snowdon's Aston Martin Abbott struck the barriers on the outside of the circuit between Old Hall and Cascades corners at unabated speed. The car flipped several times end over end, clearing the safety barriers, before coming to rest upside down where it burst into flames. The fire was caused by the roof skin being ripped off in the force of the accident, in the process this also ripped off the fuel filler pipes from the fuel tank. As it was near the beginning of the race the fuel tank was near full, when the car came to rest upside down the fuel load leaked quickly into the car.

Abbott was trapped in the car for 18 seconds while on fire. The driver's door was jammed shut and he escaped from the car by crawling through the roll cage and out of the passenger side of the car. Quick thinking by Abbott and efficient work by the race marshals meant that he escaped with only minor burns and injuries. After 2 weeks, Abbott returned to the series and took a double victory at Knockhill.

There was significant mainstream media coverage of the crash through newspapers and magazines and can be viewed on YouTube.

On Sunday 31 July 2016, Abbott was involved in a crash while racing for Power Maxed Racing in the Snetterton round of the British Touring Car Championship. A multi-car start-line crash occurred, triggered by contact between Team BKR-run Volkswagen CC driven by Mark Howard and Team Parker Racing Ford Focus of Alex Martin. Abbott was clipped by Mark Howard's spinning car and rolled several times, knocking over a TV tower and coming to rest on top of the barriers. Abbott suffered concussion and no one else was injured. Mark Howard and Alex Martin were penalised for causing the multi-car crash.

== Racing record ==
=== Complete British GT Championship results ===
(key) (Races in bold indicate pole position in class) (Races in italics indicate fastest lap in class)

Year	Team	Car	Class	1	2	3	4	5	6	7	8	9	10	11	12	13	14	15	16	DC	Points
2006	RPM	Porsche 911 GT3	GTC	OUL; 1; 12	OUL; 2 Ret	DON; 1; 15	PAU; 1; 7	PAU; 2; 7	MON; 1 Ret	MON; 2 Ret	SNE; 1 Ret	SNE; 2; 12	ROC; 1	ROC; 2						13th	30
2006	Specialist Direct	Porsche 911 GT3	GTC												BRH; 1; 16	BRH; 2; 7	SIL; 1; 18	MAG; 1	MAG; 2	13th	30
2008	Rob Austin Racing	Ginetta G50	GT4	OUL; 1 DNS	**OUL**; **2** DNS	KNO; 1; 9	**KNO**; **2** Ret	**ROC**; **1**; 14	ROC; 2; 10	SNE; 1; 16	SNE; 2; 15	THR; 1; 14	THR; 2 DSQ	BRH; 1; 12	BRH; 2; 11	SIL; 1; 7	DON; 1; 11			2nd	80
2009	Rob Austin Racing	Ginetta G50	GT4	OUL; 1 DSQ	OUL; 2; 11	SPA; 1; 9	**SPA**; **2**; 10	ROC; 1 Ret	ROC; 2; 10	KNO; 1	KNO; 2									4th	28
2009	Stark Racing	Ginetta G50	GT4									SNE; 1; 7	SNE; 2; 11	DON; 1	SIL; 1	BRH; 1	BRH; 2			4th	28
2016	GRT Grasser Racing Team	Lamborghini Huracán GT3	GT3	BRH; 1	ROC; 1	OUL; 1	OUL; 2	SIL; 1	SPA; 1; 5	SNE; 1	SNE; 2	DON; 1								17th	15
2021	2 Seas Motorsport	Mercedes-AMG GT3	GT3	BRH; 1	**SIL**; **1**; 1	DON; 1	SPA; 1	SNE; 1	SNE; 2	OUL; 1	OUL; 2	DON; 1								NC†	0†

^{†} As Abbott was a guest driver, he was ineligible to score points.

=== Complete British Touring Car Championship results ===
(key) (Races in bold indicate pole position – 1 point awarded in first race) (Races in italics indicate fastest lap – 1 point awarded all races) (* signifies that driver lead race for at least one lap – 1 point awarded all races)

Year	Team	Car	1	2	3	4	5	6	7	8	9	10	11	12	13	14	15	16	17	18	19	20	21	22	23	24	25	26	27	28	29	30	DC	Points
2014	AlcoSense Breathalysers Racing	Audi A4	BRH; 1; 18	BRH; 2; 18	BRH; 3; 15	DON; 1 Ret	DON; 2 Ret	DON; 3; 24	THR; 1; 24	THR; 2 Ret	THR; 3; 16	OUL; 1; 24	OUL; 2; 16	OUL; 3 Ret	CRO; 1; 10	CRO; 2 Ret	CRO; 3; 11	SNE; 1; 20	SNE; 2; 24	SNE; 3; 20	KNO; 1; 25	KNO; 2; 16	KNO; 3; 16	ROC; 1; 14	ROC; 2; 10	ROC; 3 Ret	SIL; 1 Ret	SIL; 2; 23	SIL; 3; 23	BRH; 1 Ret	BRH; 2 DNS	BRH; 3 NC	20th	20
2015	Exocet AlcoSense Racing	Audi A4	BRH; 1; 18	BRH; 2; 11	BRH; 3; 10	DON; 1; 19	DON; 2; 17	DON; 3; 14	THR; 1; 16	THR; 2; 14	THR; 3; 21	OUL; 1; 18	OUL; 2; 23	OUL; 3; 16	CRO; 1; 16	CRO; 2; 12	CRO; 3; 16	SNE; 1; 18	SNE; 2; 12	SNE; 3; 17	KNO; 1 DNS	KNO; 2 DNS	KNO; 3 DNS	ROC; 1; 23	ROC; 2; 23	ROC; 3 Ret	SIL; 1; 24	SIL; 2; 26	SIL; 3 Ret	BRH; 1; 16	BRH; 2; 21	BRH; 3; 17	21st	23
2016	Power Maxed Racing	Chevrolet Cruze	BRH; 1 Ret	BRH; 2; 15	BRH; 3; 13	DON; 1; 15	DON; 2; 14	DON; 3; 12	THR; 1; 15	THR; 2 Ret	THR; 3 Ret	OUL; 1; 11	OUL; 2; 11	OUL; 3; 19	CRO; 1 Ret	CRO; 2; 19	CRO; 3 Ret	SNE; 1; 15	SNE; 2 Ret	SNE; 3 Ret	KNO; 1; 20	KNO; 2; 22	KNO; 3 Ret	ROC; 1; 26	ROC; 2 NC	ROC; 3; 14	SIL; 1; 13	SIL; 2; 10	SIL; 3; 13	BRH; 1 Ret	BRH; 2; 17	BRH; 3 Ret	19th	38

=== Complete European Le Mans Series results ===
(key) (Races in bold indicate pole position; results in italics indicate fastest lap)

Year	Entrant	Class	Chassis	Engine	1	2	3	4	5	Rank	Points
2020	JMW Motorsport	LMGTE	Ferrari 488 GTE Evo	Ferrari F154CB 3.9 L Turbo V8	LEC; 4	SPA	LEC	MNZ	ALG	15th	12

Sporting positions
Preceded by Inaugural	Blancpain GT Series Asia; Champion; 2017	Succeeded by Martin Kodrić; Dennis Lind
Preceded by Inaugural	Blancpain GT Series Asia; Pro-Am Champion; 2017	Succeeded by Marco Mapelli; Hiroshi Hamaguchi
