= 2014 British Touring Car Championship =

57th season of the British Touring Car Championship

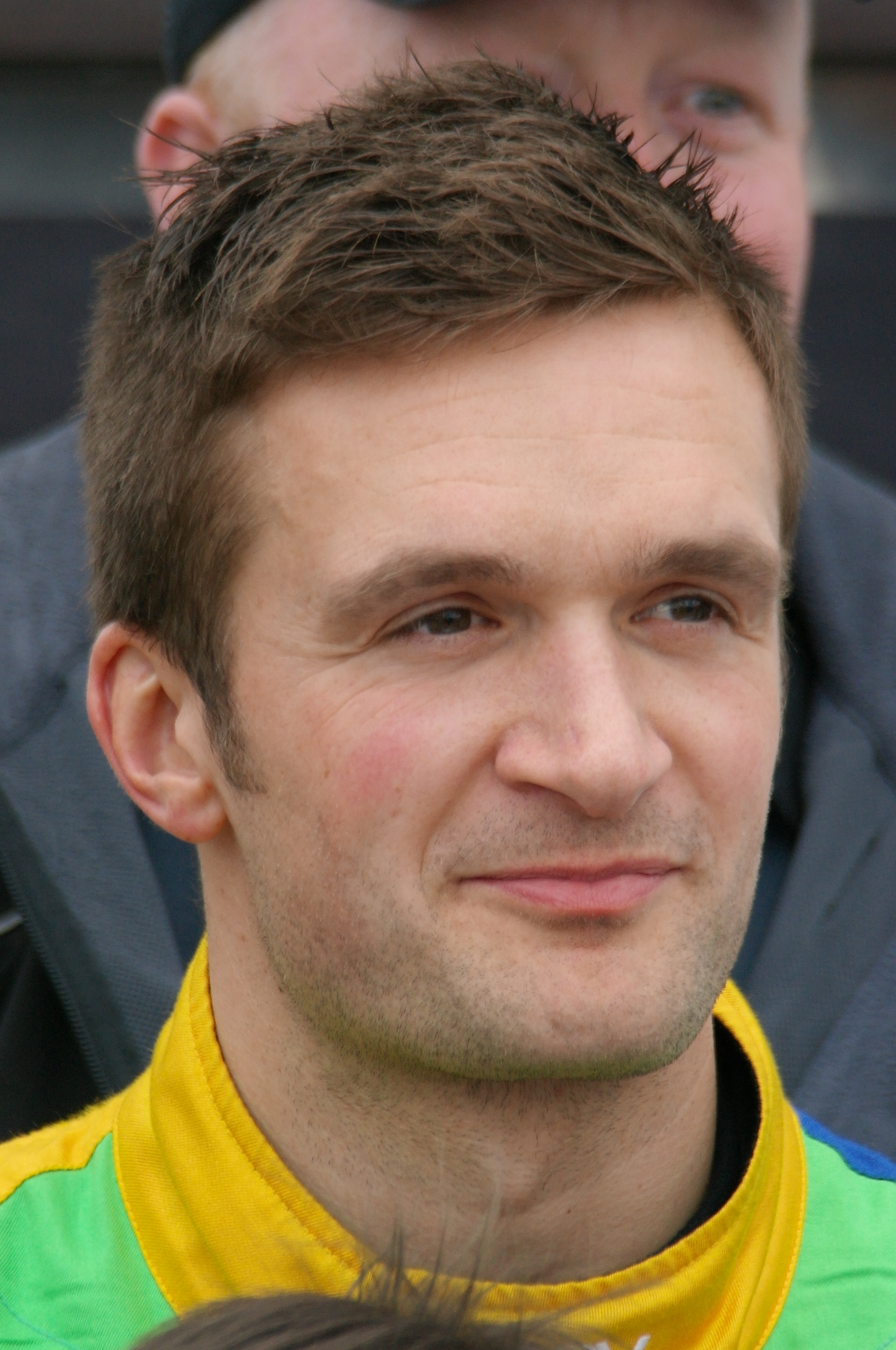
Colin Turkington, the 2014 Drivers' Champion

The 2014 Dunlop MSA British Touring Car Championship was a multi-event motor racing championship for production-based touring cars held across England and Scotland. The championship features a mix of professional motor racing teams and privately funded amateur drivers competing in highly modified versions of Family cars which are sold to the general public and conform to the technical regulations for the championship. It is one of the most popular domestic motor racing series in the United Kingdom, with an extensive program of support categories built up around the BTCC centrepiece. It was the 57th British Touring Car Championship (BTCC) season.

It was the fourth season that cars conforming to the Next Generation Touring Car (NGTC) specification competed in, and the first season that S2000 specification cars did not contest since their introduction to the BTCC in 2004. The Jack Sears Trophy, which was introduced in 2013 for the top S2000 finisher over the duration of the season, was awarded to the Independent driver who achieves the greatest improvement from their respective grid positions over the entire season. The start and finishing positions of all Independent drivers will be logged for all 30 races and the driver with the highest total number of positions gained over the season will become the Jack Sears Trophy champion.

== Teams and drivers ==
Team	Car	Engine	No.	Drivers	Rounds
Constructor Entries
(United Kingdom) Honda Yuasa Racing	Honda Civic Tourer	Honda/Neil Brown	4	(United Kingdom) Matt Neal	All
(United Kingdom) Honda Yuasa Racing	Honda Civic Tourer	Honda/Neil Brown	52	(United Kingdom) Gordon Shedden	All
(United Kingdom) MG KX Clubcard Fuel Save	MG6 GT	TOCA/Swindon	88	(United Kingdom) Sam Tordoff	All
(United Kingdom) MG KX Clubcard Fuel Save	MG6 GT	TOCA/Swindon	99	(United Kingdom) Jason Plato	All
Independent Entries
(United Kingdom) Pirtek Racing	Honda Civic	Honda/Neil Brown	1	(United Kingdom) Andrew Jordan	All
(United Kingdom) Pirtek Racing	Honda Civic	Honda/Neil Brown	30	(United Kingdom) Martin Depper	All
(United Kingdom) eBay Motors	BMW 125i M Sport	BMW/Neil Brown	5	(United Kingdom) Colin Turkington	All
(United Kingdom) eBay Motors	BMW 125i M Sport	BMW/Neil Brown	10	(United Kingdom) Rob Collard	All
(United Kingdom) eBay Motors	BMW 125i M Sport	BMW/Neil Brown	18	(United Kingdom) Nick Foster	All
(United Kingdom) Airwaves Racing	Ford Focus ST	Ford/Mountune	6	(United Kingdom) Mat Jackson	All
(United Kingdom) Airwaves Racing	Ford Focus ST	Ford/Mountune	7	(Italy) Fabrizio Giovanardi	All
(United Kingdom) Crabbie's Racing	Ford Focus ST	Ford/Mountune	44	(United Kingdom) Jack Clarke	All
(United Kingdom) CHROME Edition Restart Racing	Volkswagen CC	TOCA/Swindon	9	(Switzerland) Alain Menu	All
(United Kingdom) CHROME Edition Restart Racing	Volkswagen CC	TOCA/Swindon	31	(United Kingdom) Jack Goff	6–10
(United Kingdom) CHROME Edition Restart Racing	Volkswagen CC	TOCA/Swindon	40	(Republic of Ireland) Árón Smith	All
(United Kingdom) CHROME Edition Restart Racing	Volkswagen CC	TOCA/Swindon	39	(United Kingdom) Warren Scott	6–10
(United Kingdom) CHROME Edition Restart Racing	Vauxhall Insignia	TOCA/Swindon	39	(United Kingdom) Warren Scott	1–5
(United Kingdom) RCIB Insurance Racing	Vauxhall Insignia	TOCA/Swindon	31	(United Kingdom) Jack Goff	1–5
(United Kingdom) Handy Motorsport	Toyota Avensis	TOCA/Swindon	11	(United Kingdom) Simon Belcher	All
(United Kingdom) Speedworks Motorsport	Toyota Avensis	TOCA/Swindon	80	(United Kingdom) Tom Ingram	All
(United Kingdom) STP Racing with Sopp & Sopp	Proton Persona	Proton/Welch	12	(United Kingdom) Daniel Welch	2–10
(United Kingdom) STP Racing with Sopp & Sopp	Proton Persona	Proton/Welch	48	(United Kingdom) Ollie Jackson	All
(United Kingdom) Laser Tools Racing	Chevrolet Cruze 4dr	Chevrolet/RML	16	(United Kingdom) Aiden Moffat	1–5
(United Kingdom) Laser Tools Racing	Chevrolet Cruze 4dr	TOCA/Swindon	16	(United Kingdom) Aiden Moffat	6–10
(United Kingdom) AmD Tuning.com	Ford Focus ST	Ford/Mountune	17	(United Kingdom) Dave Newsham	All
(United Kingdom) United Autosports	Toyota Avensis	Toyota/XCtechR	20	(United Kingdom) James Cole	All
(United Kingdom) United Autosports	Toyota Avensis	Toyota/XCtechR	21	(United Kingdom) Glynn Geddie	1–8
(United Kingdom) United Autosports	Toyota Avensis	Toyota/XCtechR	23	(United Kingdom) Luke Hines	9–10
(United Kingdom) Power Maxed Racing	Chevrolet Cruze 5dr	Chevrolet/RML	28	(United Kingdom) Chris Stockton	1–3
(United Kingdom) Power Maxed Racing	Chevrolet Cruze 5dr	Chevrolet/Neil Brown	28	(United Kingdom) Chris Stockton	4–6
(United Kingdom) Power Maxed Racing	Chevrolet Cruze 5dr	TOCA/Swindon	28	(United Kingdom) Chris Stockton	7–10
(United Kingdom) WIX Racing	Mercedes-Benz A-Class	TOCA/Swindon	33	(United Kingdom) Adam Morgan	All
(United Kingdom) Houseman Racing	Toyota Avensis	TOCA/Swindon	43	(United Kingdom) Lea Wood	All
(United Kingdom) AlcoSense Breathalysers Racing	Audi A4	TOCA/Swindon	54	(United Kingdom) Hunter Abbott	All
(United Kingdom) Exocet Racing	Audi A4	TOCA/Swindon	101	(United Kingdom) Rob Austin	All
(United States) Rotek Racing	Audi S3 Saloon	TOCA/Swindon	67	(United States) Robb Holland	1–2, 4–9
(United Kingdom) Quantel BiFold Racing	MG6 GT	TOCA/Swindon	888	(United Kingdom) Marc Hynes	All

=== Driver changes ===
Changed teams

- James Cole drove United Autosports having left Team HARD. midway through the 2013 season.
- Following on from sporadic appearances in the championship in 2012 and 2013 racing for Team HARD, Robb Holland entered the championship full-time in 2014 for Rotek Racing in an Audi S3 Saloon.
- Ollie Jackson left Speedworks Motorsport to race a second Proton Persona prepared by Welch Motorsport.
- Aiden Moffat contested a full season with a Chevrolet Cruze purchased from Andy Neate having contested a handful of rounds in 2013 for Team HARD.
- Dave Newsham switched from Speedworks Motorsport to AmD Tuning.com.
- Árón Smith switched from Airwaves Racing to Team BMR.

Entering/re-entering BTCC

- Double Renault UK Clio Cup ‘Masters Cup’ Champion Simon Belcher graduated to the BTCC in a Handy Motorsport run Toyota Avensis with assistance from Speedworks Motorsport.
- Having last entered the championship in 2010 driving for Forster Motorsport, Martin Depper drove the second Pirtek Racing Honda Civic in 2014.
- 2013 European Supercar Challenge Championship champion Glynn Geddie entered the series for United Autosports.
- 1999 British Formula 3 Champion and Head of Driver Development at Marussia F1 Marc Hynes entered the BTCC in a works prepared MG6 GT run by Triple Eight Race Engineering but separate from their 'main' MG KX Clubcard Fuel Save factory team.
- 1997 and 2000 BTCC champion Alain Menu returned to the series with Team BMR.
- 2007 and 2008 BTCC champion Fabrizio Giovanardi returned to the series with Airwaves Racing.

Leaving BTCC

- Jeff Smith left the BTCC after four seasons in order to focus on other commitments.
- Frank Wrathall left the series after being sent to prison for 21 months due to pleading guilty to causing death by careless driving on 7 February 2014. Dynojet's assets had already been sold to United Autosports.
- Andy Neate decided not to return to the BTCC in 2014 having sold his Cruze to Aiden Moffat at the end of the 2013 season. Neate is focused on a return in 2015.
- Tom Onslow-Cole left the series to go and do other things, eventually driving in British GT, but stated intent to return after claiming he had 'unfinished business' in the series.

=== Team changes ===
- Ciceley Racing changed from their ex-Dynojet NGTC Toyota Avensis to a brand new, self built, NGTC Mercedes-Benz A-Class for Adam Morgan. This will be the first time for the Mercedes-Benz marque in the BTCC since 1986.
- Honda Yuasa Racing Team built Honda Civic Tourers in 2014. This marks the first time that an estate car has been run in the BTCC since 1994.
- Rotek Racing with help from Tony Gilham Racing entered the series with an Audi A3 for Robb Holland.
- Welch Motorsport built a second Proton with a more competent engine for the 2014 season.
- United Autosports entered the series with two Toyota Avensis's purchased from the Dynojet team.
- AmD Tuning.com contested the 2014 season with a Ford Focus ST Mk.III purchased from Motorbase Performance despite initial intentions to build a NGTC specification Vauxhall Astra for the 2013 season.

== Race calendar ==
The provisional calendar was announced by the championship organisers on 14 September 2013. The Oulton Park round will switch from the Island layout to the International circuit, which was last used during the 1996 season. All races were held in the United Kingdom.

Round		Circuit	Date
1	R1	Brands Hatch (Indy Circuit, Kent)	30 March
1	R2	Brands Hatch (Indy Circuit, Kent)	30 March
1	R3	Brands Hatch (Indy Circuit, Kent)	30 March
2	R4	Donington Park (National Circuit, Leicestershire)	20 April
2	R5	Donington Park (National Circuit, Leicestershire)	20 April
2	R6	Donington Park (National Circuit, Leicestershire)	20 April
3	R7	Thruxton Circuit (Hampshire)	4 May
3	R8	Thruxton Circuit (Hampshire)	4 May
3	R9	Thruxton Circuit (Hampshire)	4 May
4	R10	Oulton Park (International Circuit, Cheshire)	8 June
4	R11	Oulton Park (International Circuit, Cheshire)	8 June
4	R12	Oulton Park (International Circuit, Cheshire)	8 June
5	R13	Croft Circuit (North Yorkshire)	29 June
5	R14	Croft Circuit (North Yorkshire)	29 June
5	R15	Croft Circuit (North Yorkshire)	29 June
6	R16	Snetterton Motor Racing Circuit (300 Circuit, Norfolk)	3 August
6	R17	Snetterton Motor Racing Circuit (300 Circuit, Norfolk)	3 August
6	R18	Snetterton Motor Racing Circuit (300 Circuit, Norfolk)	3 August
7	R19	Knockhill Racing Circuit (Fife)	24 August
7	R20	Knockhill Racing Circuit (Fife)	24 August
7	R21	Knockhill Racing Circuit (Fife)	24 August
8	R22	Rockingham Motor Speedway (International Super Sports Car Circuit, Northamptonshire)	7 September
8	R23	Rockingham Motor Speedway (International Super Sports Car Circuit, Northamptonshire)	7 September
8	R24	Rockingham Motor Speedway (International Super Sports Car Circuit, Northamptonshire)	7 September
9	R25	Silverstone Circuit (National Circuit, Northamptonshire)	28 September
9	R26	Silverstone Circuit (National Circuit, Northamptonshire)	28 September
9	R27	Silverstone Circuit (National Circuit, Northamptonshire)	28 September
10	R28	Brands Hatch (Grand Prix Circuit, Kent)	12 October
10	R29	Brands Hatch (Grand Prix Circuit, Kent)	12 October
10	R30	Brands Hatch (Grand Prix Circuit, Kent)	12 October

== Results ==
Round		Circuit	Pole position	Fastest lap	Winning driver	Winning team	Winning independent
1	R1	Brands Hatch	(United Kingdom) Andrew Jordan	(United Kingdom) Andrew Jordan	(United Kingdom) Andrew Jordan	(United Kingdom) Pirtek Racing	(United Kingdom) Andrew Jordan
1	R2	Brands Hatch		(United Kingdom) Sam Tordoff	(United Kingdom) Andrew Jordan	(United Kingdom) Pirtek Racing	(United Kingdom) Andrew Jordan
1	R3	Brands Hatch		(United Kingdom) Jason Plato	(United Kingdom) Colin Turkington	(United Kingdom) eBay Motors	(United Kingdom) Colin Turkington
2	R4	Donington Park	(United Kingdom) Jason Plato	(United Kingdom) Rob Austin	(United Kingdom) Jason Plato	(United Kingdom) MG KX Clubcard Fuel Save	(United Kingdom) Andrew Jordan
2	R5	Donington Park		(United Kingdom) Andrew Jordan	(United Kingdom) Sam Tordoff	(United Kingdom) MG KX Clubcard Fuel Save	(United Kingdom) Andrew Jordan
2	R6	Donington Park		(United Kingdom) Colin Turkington	(United Kingdom) Gordon Shedden	(United Kingdom) Honda Yuasa Racing	(United Kingdom) Colin Turkington
3	R7	Thruxton Circuit	(United Kingdom) Andrew Jordan	(United Kingdom) Andrew Jordan	(United Kingdom) Andrew Jordan	(United Kingdom) Pirtek Racing	(United Kingdom) Andrew Jordan
3	R8	Thruxton Circuit		(United Kingdom) Gordon Shedden	(United Kingdom) Gordon Shedden	(United Kingdom) Honda Yuasa Racing	(United Kingdom) Andrew Jordan
3	R9	Thruxton Circuit		(United Kingdom) Matt Neal	(United Kingdom) Colin Turkington	(United Kingdom) eBay Motors	(United Kingdom) Colin Turkington
4	R10	Oulton Park	(United Kingdom) Colin Turkington	(United Kingdom) Colin Turkington	(United Kingdom) Colin Turkington	(United Kingdom) eBay Motors	(United Kingdom) Colin Turkington
4	R11	Oulton Park		(United Kingdom) Colin Turkington	(United Kingdom) Colin Turkington	(United Kingdom) eBay Motors	(United Kingdom) Colin Turkington
4	R12	Oulton Park		(United Kingdom) James Cole	(Republic of Ireland) Árón Smith	(United Kingdom) CHROME Edition Restart Racing	(Republic of Ireland) Árón Smith
5	R13	Croft Circuit	(United Kingdom) Colin Turkington	(United Kingdom) Colin Turkington	(United Kingdom) Colin Turkington	(United Kingdom) eBay Motors	(United Kingdom) Colin Turkington
5	R14	Croft Circuit		(United Kingdom) Colin Turkington	(United Kingdom) Colin Turkington	(United Kingdom) eBay Motors	(United Kingdom) Colin Turkington
5	R15	Croft Circuit		(Republic of Ireland) Árón Smith	(United Kingdom) Andrew Jordan	(United Kingdom) Pirtek Racing	(United Kingdom) Andrew Jordan
6	R16	Snetterton Motor Racing Circuit	(United Kingdom) Jason Plato	(United Kingdom) Jason Plato	(United Kingdom) Jason Plato	(United Kingdom) MG KX Clubcard Fuel Save	(United Kingdom) Colin Turkington
6	R17	Snetterton Motor Racing Circuit		(United Kingdom) Colin Turkington	(United Kingdom) Jason Plato	(United Kingdom) MG KX Clubcard Fuel Save	(United Kingdom) Colin Turkington
6	R18	Snetterton Motor Racing Circuit		(United Kingdom) Matt Neal	(Republic of Ireland) Árón Smith	(United Kingdom) CHROME Edition Restart Racing	(Republic of Ireland) Árón Smith
7	R19	Knockhill Racing Circuit	(United Kingdom) Sam Tordoff	(United Kingdom) Colin Turkington	(United Kingdom) Matt Neal	(United Kingdom) Honda Yuasa Racing	(United Kingdom) Rob Austin
7	R20	Knockhill Racing Circuit		(United Kingdom) Colin Turkington	(United Kingdom) Mat Jackson	(United Kingdom) Airwaves Racing	(United Kingdom) Mat Jackson
7	R21	Knockhill Racing Circuit		(United Kingdom) Gordon Shedden	(United Kingdom) Rob Collard	(United Kingdom) eBay Motors	(United Kingdom) Rob Collard
8	R22	Rockingham Motor Speedway	(United Kingdom) Sam Tordoff	(United Kingdom) Colin Turkington	(United Kingdom) Colin Turkington	(United Kingdom) eBay Motors	(United Kingdom) Colin Turkington
8	R23	Rockingham Motor Speedway		(United Kingdom) Colin Turkington	(United Kingdom) Colin Turkington	(United Kingdom) eBay Motors	(United Kingdom) Colin Turkington
8	R24	Rockingham Motor Speedway		(Republic of Ireland) Árón Smith	(United Kingdom) Rob Austin	(United Kingdom) Exocet Racing	(United Kingdom) Rob Austin
9	R25	Silverstone Circuit	(United Kingdom) Jason Plato	(United Kingdom) Matt Neal	(United Kingdom) Jason Plato	(United Kingdom) MG KX Clubcard Fuel Save	(United Kingdom) Colin Turkington
9	R26	Silverstone Circuit		(United Kingdom) Jack Goff	(United Kingdom) Jason Plato	(United Kingdom) MG KX Clubcard Fuel Save	(United Kingdom) Colin Turkington
9	R27	Silverstone Circuit		(United Kingdom) Adam Morgan	(United Kingdom) Mat Jackson	(United Kingdom) Airwaves Racing	(United Kingdom) Mat Jackson
10	R28	Brands Hatch	(United Kingdom) Jason Plato	(United Kingdom) Colin Turkington	(United Kingdom) Jason Plato	(United Kingdom) MG KX Clubcard Fuel Save	(United Kingdom) Colin Turkington
10	R29	Brands Hatch		(United Kingdom) Andrew Jordan	(United Kingdom) Adam Morgan (Note: Jason Plato finished the race as winner, but after the race he was awarded a 20 second penalty for causing a collision involving Colin Turkington. Adam Morgan was declared the winner of the race.)	(United Kingdom) WIX Racing	(United Kingdom) Adam Morgan
10	R30	Brands Hatch		(United Kingdom) Gordon Shedden	(United Kingdom) Gordon Shedden	(United Kingdom) Honda Yuasa Racing	(United Kingdom) Jack Clarke

== Championship standings ==
Points system
1st	2nd	3rd	4th	5th	6th	7th	8th	9th	10th	11th	12th	13th	14th	15th	R1 PP	Fastest lap	Lead a lap
20	17	15	13	11	10	9	8	7	6	5	4	3	2	1	1	1	1

Notes

- No driver may collect more than one point for leading a lap per race regardless of how many laps they lead.

=== Drivers' Championship ===
(key)

Pos	Driver	BHI			DON			THR			OUL			CRO			SNE			KNO			ROC			SIL			BHGP			Pts
1	(United Kingdom) Colin Turkington	8	3	1*	5	6	2*	8	6	1*	1*	1*	3	1*	1*	Ret	2	2*	3	Ret	4	3	1*	1*	4	2*	2*	3	3	Ret*	20	434
2	(United Kingdom) Jason Plato	2	11	3	1*	2	6	6	7	Ret	3	4	4	3	5	10	1*	1*	4	5	2	10	3	2	7	1*	1*	4	1*	13*	7	399
3	(United Kingdom) Gordon Shedden	4	2	6	6	3	1*	3	1*	6	4	5	2	2	2	4	7	3	5	3	12	6	8	8	Ret	14	11	8	Ret	6	1*	349
4	(United Kingdom) Mat Jackson	15	12	7	14	7	4	4	5	2	7	6	9	8	6	3	8	6	2	4	1*	17	9	7	5	3	4	1*	4	11	3	316
5	(United Kingdom) Andrew Jordan	1*	1*	13	3	4	5	1*	2*	4	15	10	8	6	4	1*	16	15	DNS	Ret	11	5	6	4	3	10	8	6	9	4	6	310
6	(United Kingdom) Rob Collard	6	6	4*	4	Ret	7	5	3	10	2	3	11	4	3	2	9	18	6	12	5	1*	11	9	6	7	Ret	DNS	6	3*	Ret	277
7	(United Kingdom) Sam Tordoff	10	10	12	2	1*	14	10	11	9	6	9	6	9	7	12	NC	9	7	24*	18	13	2	3	8	4	6	Ret	2*	2	4	255
8	(United Kingdom) Matt Neal	3	4	2	8	5	3	2	4	23	14	12	Ret	5	DSQ	Ret	3	4	11	1*	14*	11	17	14	9	21	13	12	Ret	DNS	DNS	207
9	(Republic of Ireland) Árón Smith	7	13	Ret	9	8	11	22	14	7	12	8	1*	23	14	9	6	8	1*	8	Ret	Ret	20	17	12	6	5	2	11	7	5	201
10	(United Kingdom) Adam Morgan	13	7	10	16	14	10	9	8	8	18	Ret	17	Ret	11	5	4	5	8	6	6	7	5	Ret	Ret	Ret	15	7	5	1*	11	185
11	(Switzerland) Alain Menu	27	17	5	13	Ret	9	7	18	11	13	11	7	7	Ret	8	5	Ret	14	11	15	8	4	6	2	5	3	5	13	Ret	DNS	176
12	(United Kingdom) Rob Austin	5	Ret	11	29	18	Ret	17	DSQ	12	5	2	5	13	Ret	Ret	11	13	18	2	3	Ret	12	5	1*	9	Ret	18	Ret	16	15	147
13	(Italy) Fabrizio Giovanardi	14	9	16	7	12	22	12	10	3	11	21	10	12	9	Ret	13	7	13	13	9	Ret	7	11	13	12	7	11	7	19	13	138
14	(United Kingdom) Tom Ingram	9	8	Ret	10	10	DSQ	13	12	13	9	7	Ret	15	8	Ret	Ret	Ret	17	7	7	9	13	Ret	11	Ret	26	19	8	5	9	121
15	(United Kingdom) Jack Goff	12	14	8	19	11	12	11	9	5	16	13	Ret	19	10	6	10	11	10	14	17	12	10	13	Ret	11	14	10	Ret	8	Ret	119
16	(United Kingdom) Nick Foster	11	5	19	18	15	8	14	Ret	20	8	Ret	15	Ret	13	7	NC	14	Ret	10	10	4*	15	Ret	DNS	15	16	15	10	9	8*	101
17	(United Kingdom) Dave Newsham	17	16	9	12	9	17	Ret	22	14	17	Ret	DNS	11	Ret	16	26	16	15	9	8	2	16	18	10	22	17	14	Ret	17	12	70
18	(United Kingdom) Marc Hynes	Ret	DSQ	18	11	23	Ret	16	13	15	10	14	13	16	15	Ret	18	10	9	16	22	15	22	16	Ret	8	12	16	12	20	10	54
19	(United Kingdom) Jack Clarke	19	19	17	25	24	15	19	17	22	20	19	18	17	12	Ret	19	25	22	18	13	14	18	15	14	13	10	13	15	10	2*	50
20	(United Kingdom) Hunter Abbott	18	18	15	Ret	Ret	24	24	Ret	16	24	16	Ret	10	Ret	11	20	24	20	25	16	16	14	10	Ret	Ret	23	23	Ret	DNS	NC	20
21	(United Kingdom) Warren Scott	16	15	23	Ret	21	Ret	Ret	Ret	Ret	23	18	14	25	Ret	17	12	Ret	Ret	15	Ret	DNS	Ret	DNS	Ret	16	9	9	Ret	DNS	Ret	19
22	(United Kingdom) Glynn Geddie	20	20	25	17	13	Ret	15	15	Ret	21	24	12	27	23	Ret	14	Ret	12	20	20	19	26	Ret	Ret							15
23	(United Kingdom) Martin Depper	DSQ	Ret	Ret	20	22	16	Ret	19	18	Ret	Ret	16	14	17	13	17	12	Ret	17	Ret	20	19	12	19	18	Ret	24	17	15	Ret	14
24	(United Kingdom) Lea Wood	22	Ret	Ret	15	17	13	18	16	17	22	17	19	18	16	14	21	19	19	23	Ret	24	Ret	DNS	DNS	Ret	21	20	16	14	14	10
25	(United Kingdom) Aiden Moffat	24	24	24	22	16	20	20	21	19	Ret	DNS	DNS	20	Ret	20	23	17	16	19	19	21	23	Ret	Ret	17	18	17	14	12	16	6
26	(United Kingdom) James Cole	Ret	21	14	27	Ret	DNS	Ret	20	Ret	19	15	20	21	18	15	22	20	25	Ret	24	22	Ret	23	Ret	19	19	Ret	Ret	Ret	19	5
27	(United States) Robb Holland	23	22	20	28	Ret	DNS				25	22	Ret	28	20	Ret	15	Ret	Ret	Ret	21	18	21	19	15	24	25	Ret				2
28	(United Kingdom) Ollie Jackson	25	25	22	26	Ret	23	23	25	Ret	Ret	Ret	22	22	19	19	24	22	24	Ret	DNS	DNS	27	22	17	Ret	Ret	DNS	19	22	21	0
29	(United Kingdom) Luke Hines																									20	20	Ret	Ret	Ret	17	0
30	(United Kingdom) Simon Belcher	21	23	21	23	20	18	Ret	23	Ret	26	23	21	26	22	18	25	21	23	21	23	23	28	20	18	25	24	22	20	21	18	0
31	(United Kingdom) Chris Stockton	26	Ret	NC	24	Ret	19	Ret	Ret	21	Ret	NC	Ret	WD	WD	WD	NC	23	Ret	22	Ret	25	25	NC	20	23	22	21	18	18	Ret	0
32	(United Kingdom) Daniel Welch				21	19	21	21	24	24	27	20	23	24	21	Ret	Ret	Ret	21	Ret	Ret	DNS	24	21	16	Ret	Ret	Ret	21	Ret	DNS	-40
Pos	Driver	BHI			DON			THR			OUL			CRO			SNE			KNO			ROC			SIL			BHGP			Pts

=== Manufacturers'/Constructors' Championship ===
MG Triple Eight BTCC 2014 Manufacturers Champions Collecting Trophy Brands Hatch.

MG won the Manufacturer's Championship in 2014, just three years after returning to the British Touring Car Championship. The MG/Triple Eight team ended Honda's four year dominance of the sport after securing 7 wins and 20 podiums throughout the season.

Pos	Manufacturer/Constructor	BHI			DON			THR			OUL			CRO			SNE			KNO			ROC			SIL			BHGP			Pts
1	MG / Triple Eight Racing	2	10	3	1	1	6	6	7	9	3	4	4	3	5	10	1	1	4	5	2	10	2	2	7	1	1	4	1	2	4	950
1	MG / Triple Eight Racing	10	11	12	2	2	14	10	11	Ret	6	9	6	9	7	12	NC	9	7	24	18	13	3	3	8	4	6	DNS	2	13	7	950
2	Honda / Team Dynamics	3	2	2	6	3	1	2	1	6	4	5	2	2	2	4	3	3	5	1	12	6	8	8	9	14	11	8	Ret	6	1	855
2	Honda / Team Dynamics	4	4	6	8	5	3	3	4	23	14	12	Ret	5	DSQ	Ret	7	4	11	3	14	11	17	14	Ret	21	13	12	Ret	DNS	DNS	855
Pos	Manufacturer/Constructor	BHI			DON			THR			OUL			CRO			SNE			KNO			ROC			SIL			BHGP			Pts

=== Teams' Championship ===
Pos	Team	BHI			DON			THR			OUL			CRO			SNE			KNO			ROC			SIL			BHGP			Pts
1	(United Kingdom) eBay Motors	6	3	1	4	6	2	5	3	1	1	1	3	1	1	2	2	2	3	10	4	1	1	1	4	2	2	3	3	3	8	724
1	(United Kingdom) eBay Motors	8	5	4	5	15	7	8	6	10	2	3	11	4	3	7	9	14	6	12	5	3	11	9	6	7	16	15	6	9	20	724
2	(United Kingdom) MG KX Clubcard Fuel Save	2	10	3	1	1	6	6	7	9	3	4	4	3	5	10	1	1	4	5	2	10	2	2	7	1	1	4	1	2	4	643
2	(United Kingdom) MG KX Clubcard Fuel Save	10	11	12	2	2	14	10	11	Ret	6	9	6	9	7	12	NC	9	7	24	18	13	3	3	8	4	6	DNS	2	13	7	643
3	(United Kingdom) Honda Yuasa Racing	3	2	2	6	3	1	2	1	6	4	5	2	2	2	4	3	3	5	1	12	6	8	8	9	14	11	8	Ret	6	1	555
3	(United Kingdom) Honda Yuasa Racing	4	4	6	8	5	3	3	4	23	14	12	Ret	5	DSQ	Ret	7	4	11	3	14	11	17	14	Ret	21	13	12	Ret	DNS	DNS	555
4	(United Kingdom) Airwaves Racing	14	9	7	7	7	4	4	5	2	7	6	9	8	6	3	8	6	2	4	1	17	7	7	5	3	4	1	4	11	3	465
4	(United Kingdom) Airwaves Racing	15	12	16	14	12	22	12	10	3	11	21	10	12	9	Ret	13	7	13	13	9	Ret	9	11	13	12	7	11	7	19	13	465
5	(United Kingdom) CHROME Edition Restart Racing	7	13	5	9	8	9	7	14	7	12	8	1	7	14	8	5	8	1	8	15	8	4	6	2	5	3	2	11	7	5	417
5	(United Kingdom) CHROME Edition Restart Racing	16	15	23	13	21	11	22	18	11	13	11	7	23	Ret	9	6	11	10	11	17	12	10	13	12	6	5	5	13	8	Ret	417
6	(United Kingdom) Pirtek Racing	1	1	13	3	4	5	1	2	4	15	10	8	6	4	1	16	12	Ret	17	11	5	6	4	3	10	8	6	9	4	6	325
6	(United Kingdom) Pirtek Racing	DSQ	Ret	Ret	20	22	16	Ret	19	18	Ret	Ret	16	14	17	13	17	15	DNS	Ret	Ret	20	19	12	19	18	Ret	24	17	15	Ret	325
7	(United Kingdom) WIX Racing	13	7	10	16	14	10	9	8	8	18	Ret	17	Ret	11	5	4	5	8	6	6	7	5	Ret	Ret	Ret	15	7	5	1	11	190
8	(United Kingdom) Exocet Racing	5	Ret	11	29	18	Ret	17	DSQ	12	5	2	5	13	Ret	Ret	11	13	18	2	3	Ret	12	5	1	9	Ret	18	Ret	16	15	146
9	(United Kingdom) Speedworks Motorsport	9	8	Ret	10	10	DSQ	13	12	13	9	7	Ret	15	8	Ret	Ret	Ret	17	7	7	9	13	Ret	11	Ret	26	19	8	5	9	124
10	(United Kingdom) AmD Tuning.com	17	16	9	12	9	17	Ret	22	14	17	Ret	DNS	11	Ret	16	26	16	15	9	8	2	16	18	10	22	17	14	Ret	17	12	76
11	(United Kingdom) RCIB Insurance Racing	12	14	8	19	11	12	11	9	5	16	13	Ret	19	10	6																69
12	(United Kingdom) Quantel BiFold Racing	Ret	DSQ	18	11	23	Ret	16	13	15	10	14	13	16	15	Ret	18	10	9	16	22	15	22	16	Ret	8	12	16	12	20	10	67
13	(United Kingdom) Crabbie's Racing	19	19	17	25	24	15	19	17	22	20	19	18	17	12	Ret	19	25	22	18	13	14	18	15	14	13	10	13	15	10	2	57
14	(United Kingdom) United Autosports	20	20	14	17	13	Ret	15	15	Ret	19	15	12	21	18	15	14	20	12	20	20	19	26	23	Ret	19	19	Ret	Ret	Ret	17	22
14	(United Kingdom) United Autosports	Ret	21	25	27	Ret	DNS	Ret	20	Ret	21	24	20	27	23	Ret	22	Ret	25	Ret	24	22	Ret	Ret	Ret	20	20	Ret	Ret	Ret	19	22
15	(United Kingdom) AlcoSense Breathalysers Racing	18	18	15	Ret	Ret	24	24	Ret	16	24	16	Ret	10	Ret	11	20	24	20	25	16	16	14	10	Ret	Ret	23	23	Ret	DNS	NC	22
16	(United Kingdom) Houseman Racing	22	Ret	Ret	15	17	13	18	16	17	22	17	19	18	16	14	21	19	19	23	Ret	24	Ret	DNS	DNS	Ret	21	20	16	14	14	13
17	(United Kingdom) Laser Tools Racing	24	24	24	22	16	20	20	21	19	Ret	DNS	DNS	20	Ret	20	23	17	16	19	19	21	23	Ret	Ret	17	18	17	14	12	16	11
18	(United States) Rotek Racing	23	22	20	28	Ret	DNS				25	22	Ret	28	20	Ret	15	Ret	Ret	Ret	21	18	21	19	15	24	25	Ret				4
19	(United Kingdom) Handy Motorsport	21	23	21	23	20	18	Ret	23	Ret	26	23	21	26	22	18	25	21	23	21	23	23	28	20	18	25	24	22	20	21	18	0
20	(United Kingdom) Power Maxed Racing	26	Ret	NC	24	Ret	19	Ret	Ret	21	Ret	NC	Ret	WD	WD	WD	NC	23	Ret	22	Ret	25	25	NC	20	23	22	21	18	18	Ret	0
21	(United Kingdom) STP Racing with Sopp & Sopp	25	25	22	21	19	21	21	24	24	27	20	22	22	19	19	24	22	21	Ret	Ret	DNS	24	21	16	Ret	Ret	Ret	19	22	21	0
21	(United Kingdom) STP Racing with Sopp & Sopp				26	Ret	23	23	25	Ret	Ret	Ret	23	24	21	Ret	Ret	Ret	24	Ret	DNS	DNS	27	22	17	Ret	Ret	DNS	21	Ret	DNS	0
Pos	Team	BHI			DON			THR			OUL			CRO			SNE			KNO			ROC			SIL			BHGP			Pts

=== Independents' Trophy ===
Pos	Driver	BHI			DON			THR			OUL			CRO			SNE			KNO			ROC			SIL			BHGP			Pts
1	(United Kingdom) Colin Turkington	8	3	1	5	6	2	8	6	1	1	1	3	1	1	Ret	2	2	3	Ret	4	3	1	1	4	2	2	3	3	Ret	20	454
2	(United Kingdom) Mat Jackson	15	12	7	14	7	4	4	5	2	7	6	9	8	6	3	8	6	2	4	1	17	9	7	5	3	4	1	4	11	3	396
3	(United Kingdom) Andrew Jordan	1	1	13	3	4	5	1	2	4	15	10	8	6	4	1	16	15	DNS	Ret	11	5	6	4	3	10	8	6	9	4	6	366
4	(United Kingdom) Rob Collard	6	6	4	4	Ret	7	5	3	10	2	3	11	4	3	2	9	18	6	12	5	1	11	9	6	7	Ret	DNS	6	3	Ret	337
5	(Republic of Ireland) Árón Smith	7	13	Ret	9	8	11	22	14	7	12	8	1	23	14	9	6	8	1	8	Ret	Ret	20	17	12	6	5	2	11	7	5	259
6	(United Kingdom) Adam Morgan	13	7	10	16	14	10	9	8	8	18	Ret	17	Ret	11	5	4	5	8	6	6	7	5	Ret	Ret	Ret	15	7	5	1	11	255
7	(Switzerland) Alain Menu	27	17	5	13	Ret	9	7	18	11	13	11	7	7	Ret	8	5	Ret	14	11	15	8	4	6	2	5	3	5	13	Ret	DNS	245
8	(Italy) Fabrizio Giovanardi	14	9	16	7	12	22	12	10	3	11	21	10	12	9	Ret	13	7	13	13	9	Ret	7	11	13	12	7	11	7	19	13	210
9	(United Kingdom) Rob Austin	5	Ret	11	29	18	Ret	17	DSQ	12	5	2	5	13	Ret	Ret	11	13	18	2	3	Ret	12	5	1	9	Ret	18	Ret	16	15	203
10	(United Kingdom) Jack Goff	12	14	8	19	11	12	11	9	5	16	13	Ret	19	10	6	10	11	10	14	17	12	10	13	Ret	11	14	10	Ret	8	Ret	191
11	(United Kingdom) Tom Ingram	9	8	Ret	10	10	DSQ	13	12	13	9	7	Ret	15	8	Ret	Ret	Ret	17	7	7	9	13	Ret	11	Ret	26	19	8	5	9	178
12	(United Kingdom) Nick Foster	11	5	19	18	15	8	14	Ret	20	8	Ret	15	Ret	13	7	NC	14	Ret	10	10	4	15	Ret	DNS	15	16	15	10	9	8	159
13	(United Kingdom) Dave Newsham	17	16	9	12	9	17	Ret	22	14	17	Ret	DNS	11	Ret	16	26	16	15	9	8	2	16	18	10	22	17	14	Ret	17	12	134
14	(United Kingdom) Marc Hynes	Ret	DSQ	18	11	23	Ret	16	13	15	10	14	13	16	15	Ret	18	10	9	16	22	15	22	16	Ret	8	12	16	12	20	10	119
15	(United Kingdom) Jack Clarke	19	19	17	25	24	15	19	17	22	20	19	18	17	12	Ret	19	25	22	18	13	14	18	15	14	13	10	13	15	10	2	100
16	(United Kingdom) Hunter Abbott	18	18	15	Ret	Ret	24	24	Ret	16	24	16	Ret	10	Ret	11	20	24	20	25	16	16	14	10	Ret	Ret	23	23	Ret	DNS	NC	53
17	(United Kingdom) Martin Depper	DSQ	Ret	Ret	20	22	16	Ret	19	18	Ret	Ret	16	14	17	13	17	12	Ret	17	Ret	20	19	12	19	18	Ret	24	17	15	Ret	48
18	(United Kingdom) Lea Wood	22	Ret	Ret	15	17	13	18	16	17	22	17	19	18	16	14	21	19	19	23	Ret	24	Ret	DNS	DNS	Ret	21	20	16	14	14	48
19	(United Kingdom) Warren Scott	16	15	23	Ret	21	Ret	Ret	Ret	Ret	23	18	14	25	Ret	17	12	Ret	Ret	15	Ret	DNS	Ret	DNS	Ret	16	9	9	Ret	DNS	Ret	47
20	(United Kingdom) Glynn Geddie	20	20	25	17	13	Ret	15	15	Ret	21	24	12	27	23	Ret	14	Ret	12	20	20	19	26	Ret	Ret							41
21	(United Kingdom) Aiden Moffat	24	24	24	22	16	20	20	21	19	Ret	DNS	DNS	20	Ret	20	23	17	16	19	19	21	23	Ret	Ret	17	18	17	14	12	16	31
22	(United Kingdom) James Cole	Ret	21	14	27	Ret	DNS	Ret	20	Ret	19	15	20	21	18	15	22	20	25	Ret	24	22	Ret	23	Ret	19	19	Ret	Ret	Ret	19	18
23	(United States) Robb Holland	23	22	20	28	Ret	DNS				25	22	Ret	28	20	Ret	15	Ret	Ret	Ret	21	18	21	19	15	24	25	Ret				11
24	(United Kingdom) Simon Belcher	21	23	21	23	20	18	Ret	23	Ret	26	23	21	26	22	18	25	21	23	21	23	23	28	20	18	25	24	22	20	21	18	5
25	(United Kingdom) Luke Hines																									20	20	Ret	Ret	Ret	17	2
26	(United Kingdom) Ollie Jackson	25	25	22	26	Ret	23	23	25	Ret	Ret	Ret	22	22	19	19	24	22	24	Ret	DNS	DNS	27	22	17	Ret	Ret	DNS	19	22	21	2
27	(United Kingdom) Chris Stockton	26	Ret	NC	24	Ret	19	Ret	Ret	21	Ret	NC	Ret	WD	WD	WD	NC	23	Ret	22	Ret	25	25	NC	20	23	22	21	18	18	Ret	2
28	(United Kingdom) Daniel Welch				21	19	21	21	24	24	27	20	23	24	21	Ret	Ret	Ret	21	Ret	Ret	DNS	24	21	16	Ret	Ret	Ret	16	Ret	DNS	-36
Pos	Driver	BHI			DON			THR			OUL			CRO			SNE			KNO			ROC			SIL			BHGP			Pts

=== Independent Teams' Trophy ===
Pos	Team	BHI			DON			THR			OUL			CRO			SNE			KNO			ROC			SIL			BHGP			Pts
1	(United Kingdom) eBay Motors	6	3	1	4	6	2	5	3	1	1	1	3	1	1	2	2	2	3	10	4	1	1	1	4	2	2	3	3	3	8	527
2	(United Kingdom) Airwaves Racing	14	9	7	7	7	4	4	5	2	7	6	6	8	6	3	8	6	2	4	1	17	7	7	5	3	4	1	4	11	3	430
3	(United Kingdom) Pirtek Racing	1	1	13	3	4	5	1	2	4	15	10	8	6	4	1	16	12	Ret	17	11	5	6	4	3	10	8	6	9	4	6	413
4	(United Kingdom) CHROME Edition Restart Racing	7	13	5	9	8	9	7	14	7	12	8	1	7	14	8	5	8	1	8	15	8	4	6	2	5	3	2	11	7	5	394
5	(United Kingdom) WIX Racing	13	7	10	16	14	10	9	8	8	18	Ret	17	Ret	11	5	4	5	8	6	6	7	5	Ret	Ret	Ret	15	7	5	1	11	296
6	(United Kingdom) Exocet Racing	5	Ret	11	29	18	Ret	17	DSQ	12	5	2	5	13	Ret	Ret	11	13	18	2	3	Ret	12	5	1	9	Ret	18	Ret	16	15	240
7	(United Kingdom) Speedworks Motorsport	9	8	Ret	10	10	DSQ	13	12	13	9	7	Ret	15	8	Ret	Ret	Ret	17	7	7	9	13	Ret	11	Ret	26	19	8	5	9	220
8	(United Kingdom) AmD Tuning.com	17	16	9	12	9	17	Ret	22	14	17	Ret	DNS	11	Ret	16	26	16	15	9	8	2	16	18	10	22	17	14	Ret	17	12	200
9	(United Kingdom) Quantel BiFold Racing	Ret	DSQ	18	11	23	Ret	16	13	15	10	14	13	16	15	Ret	18	10	9	16	22	15	22	16	Ret	8	12	16	12	20	10	190
10	(United Kingdom) Crabbie's Racing	19	19	17	25	24	15	19	17	22	20	19	18	17	12	Ret	19	25	22	18	13	14	18	15	14	13	10	13	15	10	2	188
11	(United Kingdom) United Autosports	20	20	14	17	13	Ret	15	15	Ret	19	15	12	21	18	15	14	20	12	20	20	19	26	23	Ret	19	19	Ret	Ret	Ret	17	138
12	(United Kingdom) RCIB Insurance Racing	12	14	8	19	11	12	11	9	5	16	13	Ret	19	10	6																133
13	(United Kingdom) Houseman Racing	22	Ret	Ret	15	17	13	18	16	17	22	17	19	18	16	14	21	19	19	23	Ret	24	Ret	DNS	DNS	Ret	21	20	16	14	14	117
14	(United Kingdom) AlcoSense Breathalysers Racing	18	18	15	Ret	Ret	24	24	Ret	16	24	16	Ret	10	Ret	11	20	24	20	25	16	16	14	10	Ret	Ret	23	23	Ret	DNS	NC	101
15	(United Kingdom) Laser Tools Racing	24	24	24	22	16	20	20	21	19	Ret	DNS	DNS	20	Ret	20	23	17	16	19	19	21	23	Ret	Ret	17	18	17	14	12	16	99
16	(United Kingdom) Handy Motorsport	21	23	21	23	20	18	Ret	23	Ret	26	23	21	26	22	18	25	21	23	21	23	23	28	20	18	25	24	23	20	21	18	72
17	(United States) Rotek Racing	23	22	20	28	Ret	DNS				25	22	Ret	28	20	Ret	15	Ret	Ret	Ret	21	18	21	19	15	24	25	Ret				56
18	(United Kingdom) Power Maxed Racing	26	Ret	NC	24	Ret	19	Ret	Ret	21	Ret	NC	Ret	WD	WD	WD	NC	23	Ret	22	Ret	25	25	NC	20	23	22	21	18	18	Ret	29
19	(United Kingdom) STP Racing with Sopp & Sopp	25	25	22	21	19	21	21	24	24	27	20	22	22	19	19	24	22	21	Ret	Ret	DNS	24	21	16	Ret	Ret	Ret	19	22	21	6
Pos	Team	BHI			DON			THR			OUL			CRO			SNE			KNO			ROC			SIL			BHGP			Pts

=== Jack Sears Trophy ===
After its introduction in 2013, the Jack Sears Trophy will now be awarded to the independent driver who makes up the most places over the course of the 2014 season. Any drivers who are penalised at a meeting will not accrue points towards the Trophy.

Pos	Driver	BHI	DON	THR	OUL	CRO	SNE	KNO	ROC	SIL	BHGP	Total
1	(United Kingdom) Dave Newsham	10	10	13	0	16	10	8	12	17	12	108
2	(Switzerland) Alain Menu	22	20	10	0	18	16	10	4	3	0	103
3	(United Kingdom) Rob Collard	4	30	5	0	8	21	0	10	4	20	102
4	(United Kingdom) Hunter Abbott	5	0	13	8	22	8	9	21	8	0	94
5	(United Kingdom) Adam Morgan	7	7	2	15	23	4	11	1	20	4	94
6	(United Kingdom) Martin Depper	0	4	10	11	14	10	11	14	9	9	92
7	(United Kingdom) Nick Foster	8	10	8	13	22	16	0	0	6	1	84
8	(United Kingdom) Rob Austin	23	11	6	6	0	2	0	9	10	13	80
9	(Republic of Ireland) Árón Smith	0	1	24	4	13	1	8	8	2	19	80
10	(United Kingdom) Andrew Jordan	0	4	5	7	0	15	23	2	10	12	78
11	(United Kingdom) Simon Belcher	6	8	6	9	12	6	7	10	3	9	76
12	(Italy) Fabrizio Giovanardi	9	4	2	12	9	0	9	4	12	5	66
13	(United Kingdom) Jack Goff	0	8	2	4	9	1	10	7	6	19	66
14	(United Kingdom) Mat Jackson	8	10	4	1	11	4	6	5	4	12	65
15	(United Kingdom) Chris Stockton	3	10	10	0	WD	6	8	9	6	10	62
16	(United Kingdom) Jack Clarke	9	0	6	4	11	4	10	5	3	10	62
17	(United Kingdom) Ollie Jackson	7	4	4	6	8	7	0	13	0	11	60
18	(United Kingdom) Lea Wood	2	11	8	6	10	2	5	0	8	7	59
19	(United Kingdom) James Cole	15	0	8	4	6	4	8	8	2	3	58
20	(United Kingdom) Tom Ingram	1	2	1	2	7	12	6	13	7	6	57
21	(United Kingdom) Daniel Welch		11	8	8	8	5	0	13	0	0	53
22	(United Kingdom) Aiden Moffat	3	8	10	0	15	6	1	0	1	7	51
23	(United States) Robb Holland	8	0		5	8	8	11	9	0		49
24	(United Kingdom) Glynn Geddie	3	8	4	12	4	14	1	0			46
25	(United Kingdom) Warren Scott	0	9	0	9	8	5	6	0	7	0	44
26	(United Kingdom) Marc Hynes	0	0	4	1	1	9	0	6	0	22	43
27	(United Kingdom) Colin Turkington	8	0	11	5	0	4	0	3	3	5	39
28	(United Kingdom) Luke Hines									6	6	12
