= Brake (charity) =

International charity

- Founded: 1995
- Type: Charity
- Purpose: Road safety
- Key people: CEO Mary Williams OBE
- Employees: approx 35
- Website: Brake; Road safety week

Brake is a road safety charity. It was established in 1995. It coordinates Road Safety Week, provides support services for people bereaved and injured in road crashes.

== History ==
Brake was formed in 1995 by former transport journalist Mary Williams OBE. Mary Williams formed Brake with the aims of victim support and preventing road deaths and injuries through campaigns that were both community and policy oriented. help

== Functions ==
The charity aims to promote awareness of road safety issues and care for road crash victims through a number of different services and campaigns. It founded and runs an annual road safety week.

It provides services for suddenly bereaved people, including helplines and online literature.

== Initiatives ==
In September 2014, Brake has organised online webinar for European countries focused on engaging way to get life-saving road safety messages out to the public and help to prevent road death and injury.

== See also ==
- RoSPA
- Think! - DfT's road safety campaign
- IAM RoadSmart - Road safety charity
