= Next Generation Touring Car =

Race car class

Motor racing formula
- Category: Touring cars
- Country or region: United Kingdom (Sweden) / (Denmark) Scandinavia
- Championships: BTCC (2011 – present); STCC (2012)
- Inaugural season: 2011
- Status: Active

Next Generation Touring Car, also known as NGTC and by its Fédération Internationale de l'Automobile (FIA) designation TCN-1, is an FIA and TOCA specification and classification for production based race cars. The specification covers national level touring car racing as the successor of BTC Touring category. The goal of the limited choices in engines and parts in the NGTC classification is to allow more manufacturers and privateers to race by reducing the cost of a competitive car and to reduce reliance on the increasingly expensive Super 2000 equipment. The only significant differences between different models is the external body shells and the use of front- or rear-wheel drive; the suspension, brakes and transmissions are common to all cars, and engines are of uniform performance.

The specification was created for use in the British Touring Car Championship and was phased in over three years from the 2011 British Touring Car Championship season. NGTC engines were first used in the 2010 season by Pinkney Motorsport, Pirtek Racing and Special Tuning UK.

The introduction of these new technical regulations were designed to fulfil the following criteria:

- Dramatically reduce the design, build and running costs of the cars and engines
- Maintain present levels of performance until 2013 to ensure performance parity with current S2000 cars until that point
- Reduce the potential for significant performance disparities between cars
- ‘Future-proof’ the regulations by being able to easily modify the various performance parameters
- Reduce reliance on WTCC S2000 equipment, due to increasing costs/complexity and concerns as to its future sustainability/direction

In December 2014 the FIA ratified support for technical regulations used in BTCC, designating the specification as TCN-1. The specification is a model for higher class national touring car championships to follow.

== Specification ==
=== Engine ===
The engine is a 300+ bhp 2 L turbo-charged direct injection unit using fly by wire throttle control. It is intended to have a low cost to develop, build, buy and maintain. Teams can decide whether to build their own unit to the spec, or teams can lease/purchase a ready-built TOCA-BTCC engine. The engines have an over-boost function allowing a brief increase in power output.

The NGTC engine had its first run in February 2010, during testing for the 2010 season. Pirtek Racing's Vauxhall Vectra was fitted with the engine, which performed well during a week's testing at Snetterton.

During the 2010 BTCC Season the NGTC engine was used by three teams; Pirtek Racing and Pinkney Motorsport, using a Vauxhall Vectra, and Special Tuning using a SEAT Leon.

=== Drivetrain ===
- Xtrac 6 speed sequential-shift gearbox.
- AP Racing carbon clutch.
- Front or Rear Wheel Drive. Originally TOCA announced that only front wheel drive cars would be eligible to take part. However, after high interest from teams running rear wheel drive cars, TOCA amended the spec to include both front and rear wheel drive cars.

=== Suspension ===
- Full front sub-frame incorporating suspension, brakes, transmission and engine location that attaches to specified roll cage locations.
- Rear sub-frame that attaches to specified roll cage locations.
- Multi-adjustable double wishbone suspension with coil-over dampers.

=== Bodyshell ===
- 2, 3, 4 or 5 door of a minimum 4.4m length. (2 or 3 door cars must share the same basic body profile as the 4/5 door model).
- Equalised width of 1875mm
- Specified front aerodynamic device incorporating flat floor, apertures for radiator, brake cooling ducts, intercooler and side exits.
- Specified rear wing profile.
- Base vehicle must be freely on sale in the UK through the manufacturer's normal dealer network
- Specified 18" centre-lock wheel

=== Brakes ===
- AP Racing specified package
- AP Racing specified pedal-box

=== Electronics ===
- Cosworth Electronics specified package incorporating ECU, dash, data-logging and scrutineering logger.
- Common power management box, switch panels and wiring loom design

=== Target Price ===
The target price for a complete car, less engine was expected to be around £100,000 depending on final components used by each team and the running cost. The cost for a TOCA-BTCC Engine will be £25,000 with the option to be leased. However the target price is a lot higher than expected - it was reported that the car, less engine is around £200,000.

== Models ==
Make	Model	Image	Developer	Years active
Alfa Romeo	Giulietta		HMS Racing	2018
Audi	A4		Rob Austin Racing	2011–2015
Audi	S3 Saloon		Rotek Racing	2014–2020
Audi	S3 Saloon		Power Maxed Racing	2026–present
BMW	125i M Sport		West Surrey Racing	2013–2020
BMW	330i M Sport		West Surrey Racing	2019–2021
BMW	330e M Sport		West Surrey Racing	2022–2024
BMW	330i M Sport LCI		West Surrey Racing	2025-present
Chevrolet	Cruze (4dr)		IP Tech Race Engineering	2013–2017
Chevrolet	Cruze (5dr)		RML Group	2014
CUPRA	León Competición		Team HARD	2021–2025
Ford	Focus ST		Motorbase Performance	2012–2017
Ford	Focus RS		Motorbase Performance	2018–2019
Ford	Focus ST 20		Motorbase Performance	2020–2025
Ford	Focus Titanium Saloon		Motorbase Performance	2026–present
Honda	Civic		Team Dynamics	2012–2015
Honda	Civic Tourer		Team Dynamics	2014
Honda	Civic Type R (FK2)		Team Dynamics	2015–2020
Honda	Civic Type R (FK8)		Team Dynamics	2018–2025
Hyundai	i30 Fastback N Performance		Excelr8 Motorsport	2020–present
Infiniti	Q50		Pro Motorsport	2015–2019
Infiniti	Q50 GT		Laser Tools Racing	2020–2022
Mercedes-Benz	A-Class		Ciceley Racing	2014–2020
Mercedes-Benz	AMG A35 Saloon		RML	2026–present
MG	6 GT		Triple Eight Racing	2012–2019
Proton	Gen-2		Welch Motorsport	2011
Proton	Persona		Welch Motorsport	2012–2016
Subaru	Levorg GT		Team BMR	2016–2019
Toyota	Avensis		GPRM	2011–2018
Toyota	Corolla GT		Speedworks Motorsport	2019–present
Vauxhall	Insignia		Thorney Motorsport	2011–2014
Vauxhall	Astra		Power Maxed Racing	2017–2025
Volkswagen	CC		Team HARD	2013–2020

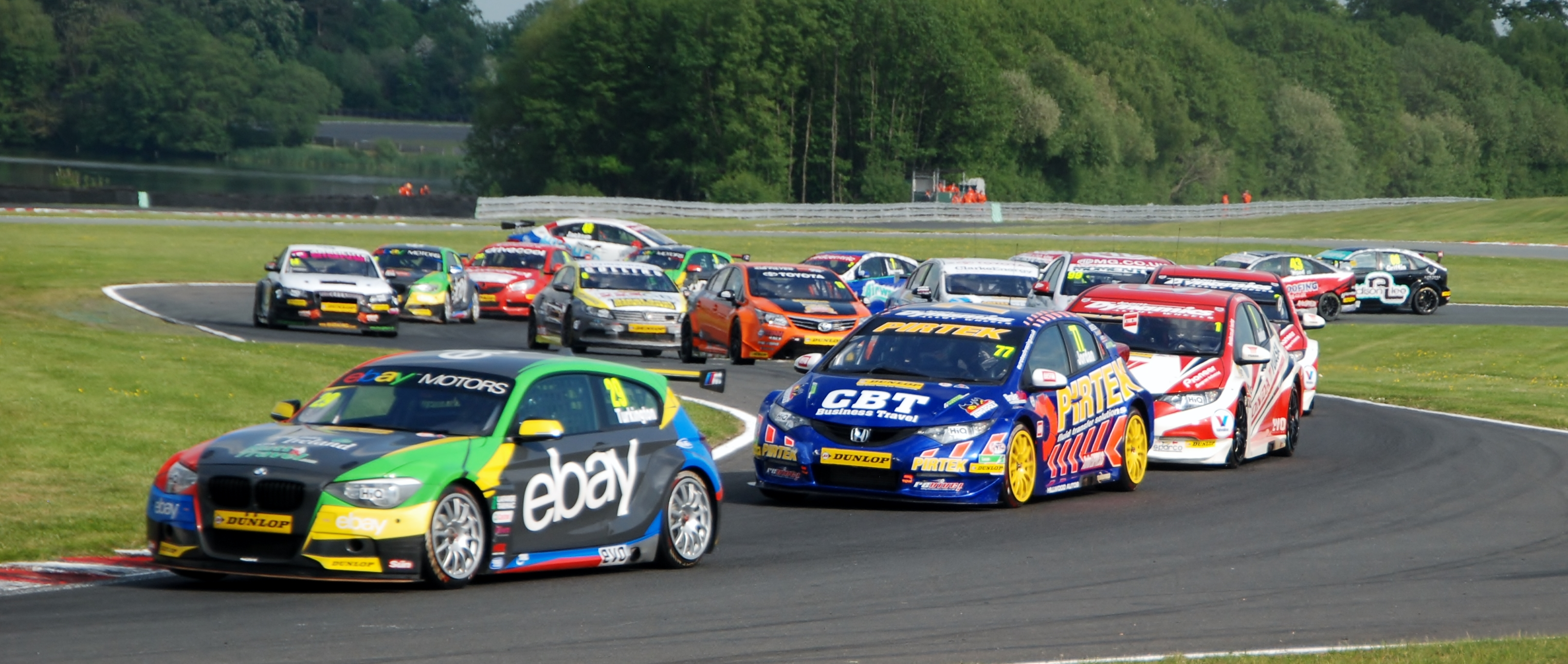
A group of cars going through the Hislop's and Knickerbrook corners at Oulton Park in the 2013 BTCC season.

The following Next Generation Touring Cars have competed in championships:

- Audi A4 - Made its debut during the first round of the 2011 BTCC. Built by GPR Motorsport, Rob Austin Racing ran a single A4 for most of the season, firstly using an engine prepared by Ric Wood and then using a Lehmann-built engine from Oulton Park onwards. A second A4 was run by the team from round nine. The car took a second place during Round Eight's third race at Rockingham, after leading part of the race. For the 2012 season the car was modified by the team, with the aerodynamics being updated. For 2013 the Audi's featuring updated bodywork to reflect the road car's facelift and now using engines prepared by Field Motorsport, who maintained the Lehmann engines midway through 2012. For Oulton Park, Austin's A4 used the TOCA-BTCC engine in a bid to find extra performance. The second car of Will Bratt was fitted with the new engine at Croft. Austin took his maiden BTCC win at Rockingham later that season, Audi's first in the BTCC since 1997. Austin went on to take his second win a year later, again at Rockingham.
- Proton Gen-2/Proton Persona - Welch Motorsport reintroduced the Proton marque to the BTCC in 2011. This was the first appearance of the brand since 2004. Before the start of the 2012 season Welch Motorsport adapted the aerodynamics of the Proton Gen-2 to reflect the Persona model. Initially the car used the TOCA-BTCC engine, but for 2014 the team built a second car and developed an in-house engine in conjunction with X Ctech R. The engine proved to be both underpowered and unreliable, both Dan Welch and Ollie Jackson failed to score points in the drivers' championship.
- Toyota Avensis - First seen as a prototype in 2010 during practice for the final round at Brands Hatch. The Avensis was built by GPRM and chosen as a demo model for the BTCC to launch the new specification ahead of the 2011 championship. Dynojet and Speedworks Motorsport ran one Toyota Avensis each in 2011, driven by Frank Wrathall and Tony Hughes respectively. Dynojet's car used a Toyota-based engine built by X Ctech R while the Speedworks car used the TOCA-BTCC unit developed by Swindon Engines, which was available for lease to all entries. The car showed top 12 potential early in the season. The Avensis scored its first points at Snetterton circuit in August 2011 at the hands of Frank Wrathall. Over the course of the season, Wrathall took four podiums. In 2012, the cars were aerodynamically upgraded to reflect the design of the new Avensis and Speedworks expanded to two cars. Wrathall took the first win for the car and the first win for Toyota in 19 years. A fourth Toyota appeared on the grid for 2013. Adam Morgan's family-run team Ciceley Racing acquired Wrathall's 2011 car, fitted with a TOCA-BTCC engine. Five Toyota's made the 2014 grid. Speedworks ran one car whilst providing engineering support to Simon Belcher and Handy Motorsport. Following Frank Wrathall's conviction for causing death by careless driving, Dynojet sold the team's assets to United Autosports, entering Wrathall's race car and a second car using Wrathall's spare shell. The fifth Avensis was entered by Houseman Racing, running a TOCA-BTCC engine, after the team were forced to look for a new car following the abolition of the Super 2000 cars.
- Vauxhall Insignia - Thorney Motorsport introduced the Vauxhall Insignia to the BTCC during the final round of the 2011 BTCC. However, due to lack of testing time, the car failed to start any races. The car did compete in select races during the 2012 season. At the end of the season Tony Gilham Racing bought the two Insignias, with Jack Goff finishing second at the final round of 2013. In 2014 the cars changed ownership again since Tony Gilham Racing merged with BMR Restart to form Team BMR. The two Insignia's ran alongside two Volkswagen CC's for the first half of the season, until they were replaced by two more CC's.

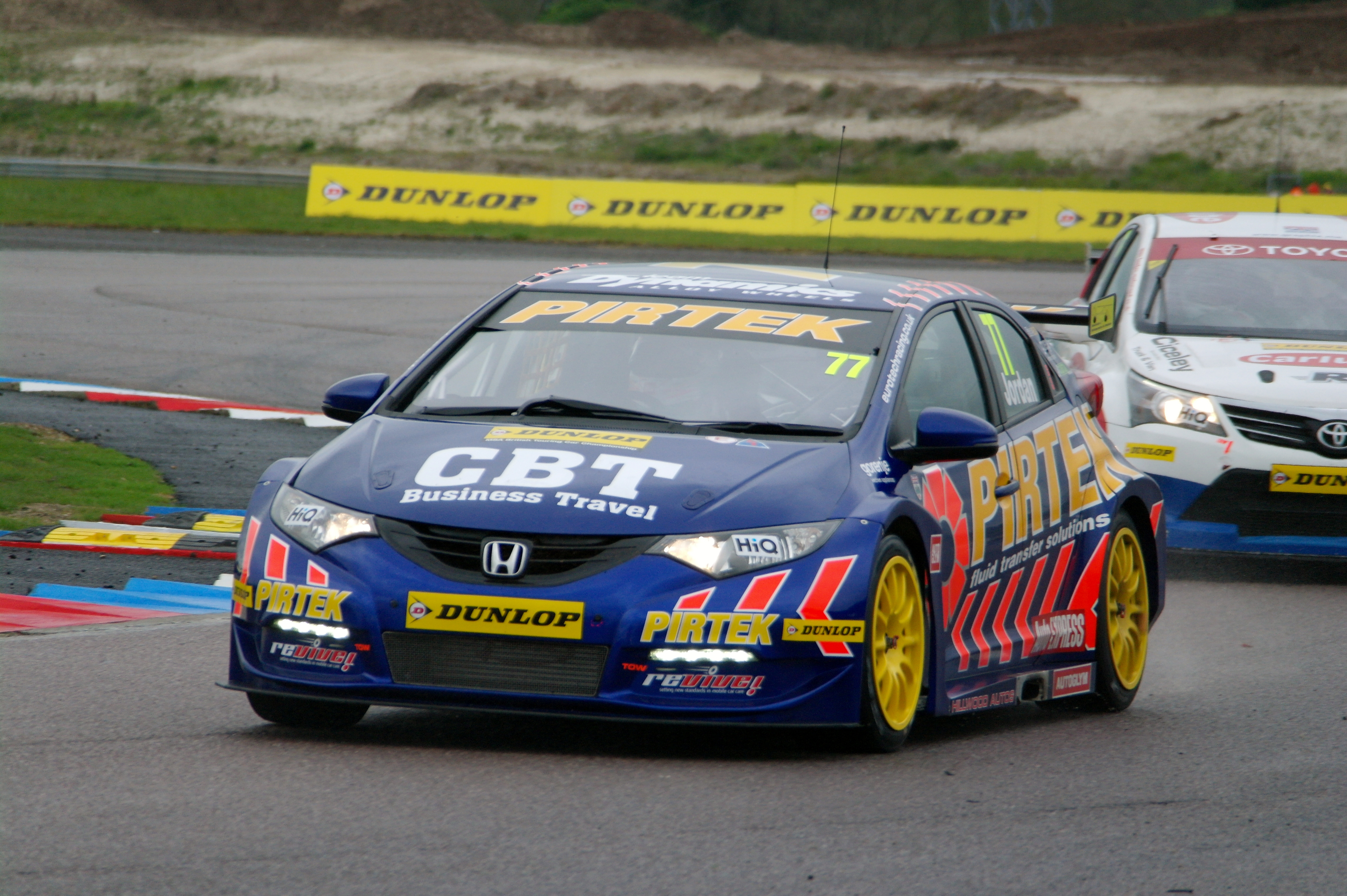
Pirtek Racing's NGTC Honda Civic at Thruxton, with a Speedworks Motorsport Toyota Avensis behind.

- Honda Civic - Honda Racing Team swapped to the new ninth generation Honda Civic, built fully to NGTC regulations, in the 2012 BTCC season. They were the first manufacturer backed team to announce their intention to run fully to the NGTC specification. The Honda Civic was about to be the first NGTC car to be raced in the Scandinavian Touring Car Championship, at the hands of Tomas Engström, but it didn't happen. At the first round of the 2012 season, the Civic became the first full NGTC specification winner. As of the end of the 2013 season the car has won in total of 10 titles for 2 seasons of racing.
- MG6 GT - MG KX Momentum Racing ran a pair of MG6 GT models in the 2012 British Touring Car Championship season. This made MG the second manufacturer to announce plans to run fully NGTC specification cars. Triple 8 continued to run the MG6 GTs until 2018 when they competed in the 2018 championship with AmD with AutoAid/RCIB Insurance Racing. In 2019, Excelr8 Motorsport ran the ex-Triple 8, AmDTuning.Com MG6s. The cars were relatively backmarkers and the team only scored four points throughout the year.
- Ford Focus ST - Redstone Racing compete with the third generation Ford Focus ST. The car was revealed hours prior the 2012 round at Snetterton with Mat Jackson driving the car for the remainder of the 2012 season. Only one car was entered, with expansion of 2 additional cars for team for the next season.
- BMW 125i M Sport - West Surrey Racing are switching to NGTC spec BMW 125i cars to replace their S2000 BMW 320si that they have been running since 2007. The team will use 3 cars for the season.
- Volkswagen CC - Tony Gilham announced that they were going to run at least 2 VW CC cars in the 2013 season alongside their 2 Vauxhall Insignia cars with both models racing under different team label to distinguish them as separate entries. The team ran only 1 car with BMR Restart acquired the second shell, in which their driver Warren Scott raced in the second half of the season.
- Chevrolet Cruze 4dr - In January 2013 Andy Neate announced his intentions to continue in BTCC in 2013 under his own newly created IP Tech Race Engineering team with NGTC Chevrolet Cruze under the Club 44 banner. Unlike BTC Racing's version of the Chevrolet Cruze, the team uses the saloon version of the car. The car made its first race appearance for the season at Snetterton.
- Chevrolet Cruze 5dr - Following Chevrolet's withdrawal from the 2012 season, two NGTC Cruze shells were mothballed by RML Group. However, in October 2012, BTC Racing announced that they had bought one of the shells with a view to enter it at the start of 2013. Due to lack of budget the first appearance was postponed until 2014.
- Mercedes-Benz A-Class - Ciceley Racing switched from the Toyota Avensis to their own built NGTC-spec built Mercedes-Benz A-Class. It was the first time since 1986 that a Mercedes-Benz car will be in the series.
- Audi S3 Saloon - The German-based American outfit Rotek Racing announced their intentions to enter the series with two NGTC-spec built Audi S3 for Robb Holland.
- Honda Civic Tourer - The Honda Racing Team switched to the brand new vehicle which is going to replace the current NGTC Honda Civic though the car model is due to be announced. On 29 November 2013 Honda Civic Tourer was announced as the team's new car. This is the second estate car ever in the BTCC since 1994 and the first one built to the current regulations.
- Infiniti Q50 and Infinite Q50 GT - In October 2014, it was announced that two Infiniti Q50s were to debut in the first round of 2015 at Brands Hatch, officially backed by Infiniti. The cars would be run by Pro Motorsport, entering as Support Our Paras Racing, with the team intending enter injured paratroopers in the cars. After a test session at Mallory Park revealed an issue, only one Q50 entered the first round. After three rounds of disappointing finishes, Infiniti separated from the team and withdrew its support and the team decreased to a single entry for the rest of the year. In 2019, Laser Tools Racing switched from running a Mercedes-Benz A-Class to an Infiniti Q50 GT, although an independent entry. After a successful season, which gave the Q50 its first podium, a second place. The team announced on 26 November 2019 that they would run two Infiniti Q50s.
- Subaru Levorg GT - Warren Scott's Team BMR ran four Subaru Levorg GTs in the 2016 season, marking the debut of the Japanese marque in the championship. The car took the championship title in 2017. The four-year deal ended in 2019.
- Vauxhall Astra - Power Maxed Racing switched from running the Chevrolet Cruze to the Vauxhall Astra, with support from the manufacturer. In 2018, the new Astra scored its first overall and manufacturer victory at Brands Hatch with Senna Proctor.
- Honda Civic Type R (FK8) - Halfords Yuasa Racing switched from the old FK2 Civic Type R to the new FK8 model for the 2018 season. They used it for a second year in 2019. BTC Racing followed by running two FK8s next season.
- Ford Focus RS - In 2018, Motorbase Performance announced they would return in a Ford Focus RS running three cars. The car took its first win in 2018 at Knockhill. The Focus RS trio returned in 2019, scoring its only win at Croft in race 3.
- Alfa Romeo Giulietta - Simon Belcher's Handy Motorsport returned to the BTCC in 2018 with Rob Austin driving a new Alfa Romeo Giulietta, the first Alfa Romeo in the BTCC in 11 years. The car finished on the podium twice at Brands Hatch at the beginning and end of the season, ending the season 14th in the standings with 126 points.
- BMW 330i M Sport - West Surrey Racing introduced a change of car from the BMW 125i to the BMW 330i M Sport. Colin Turkington later went on to win the 2019 British Touring Car Championship title in the 330i M Sport.
- Toyota Corolla GT - Speedworks Motorsport entered the 2019 season with a new Toyota Corolla GT as a single manufacturer entry. The car claimed its first win at Donington Park in race 3.
- Hyundai i30 Fastback N Performance - Excelr8 Motorsport announced that they would switch from the MG6 GTs to the new Hyundai i30 Fastback N Performance. This will be the first Hyundai to compete in the British Touring Car Championship, the team will compete with the support of "key players in Hyundai's UK dealer network" and will also work with Cosworth Electronics to prepare the car for the introduction of hybrid technology into the series, which is set to be introduced in 2022.

== Series ==
=== Current ===
Series currently (as of 2019) allowing cars built to NGTC rules to race:

- British Touring Car Championship - Fully eligible to race from the opening round of the 2011 British Touring Car Championship season. NGTC engines were first allowed during the 2010 season.

=== Former ===
- Scandinavian Touring Car Championship - Fully eligible to race from the opening round of the 2012 Scandinavian Touring Car Championship season. Following the reunification of STCC with rival TTA series and the adoption of the Solution-F specification the NGTC regulations were scrapped. During the only season where NGTC cars were allowed only NGTC engined S2000 cars were competing alongside the regular S2000 cars (including the WTCC Chevrolet Cruze 1.6T and the CNG Volkswagen Scirocco).

== See also ==
- Dallara SF14
- Dallara SF19
- Dallara SF23
- FIA Super Touring
- BTC Touring
- World Rally Car
- Group Rally1
