= Richard Hawken =

British racing driver (born 1972)

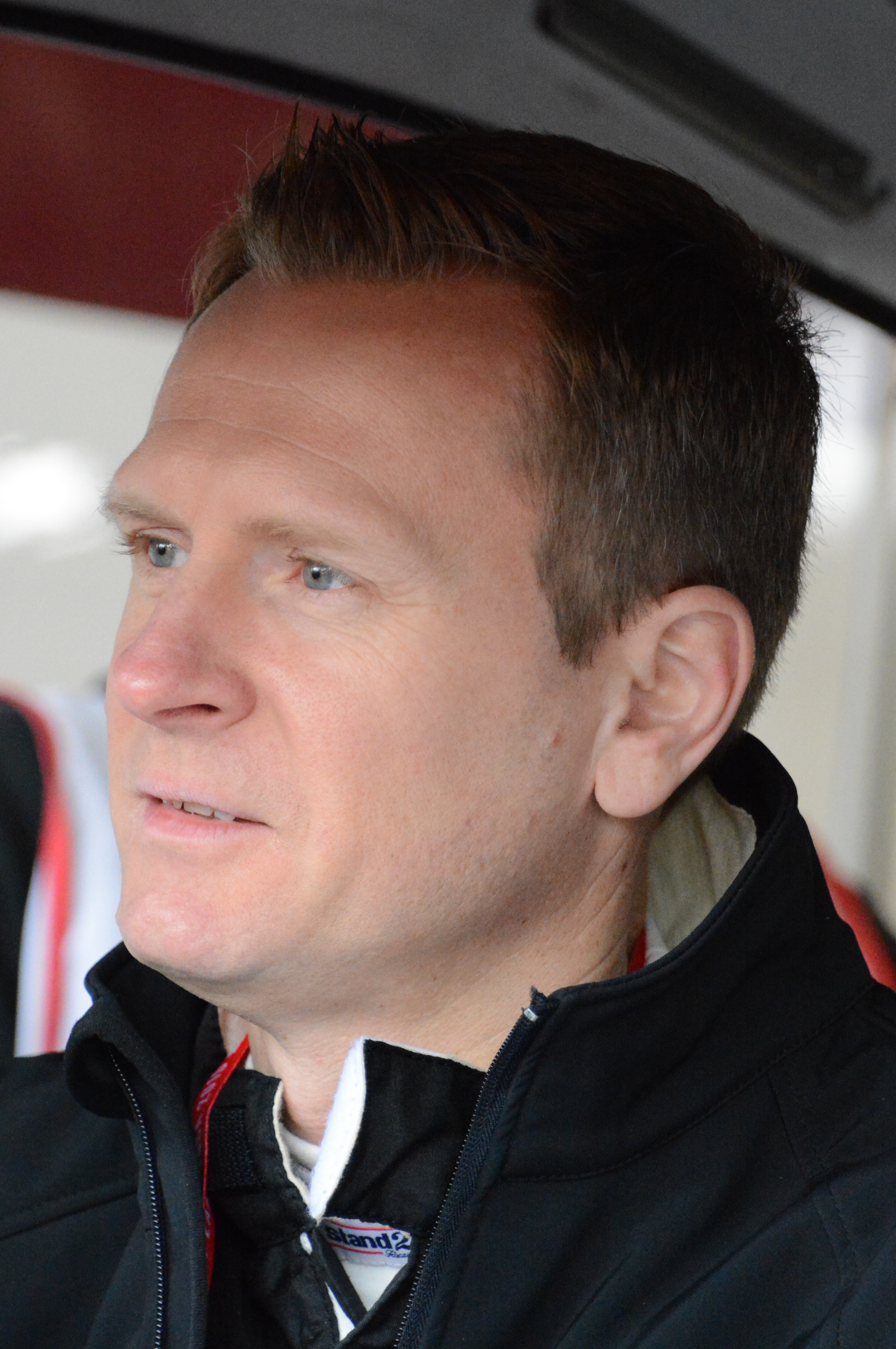
- Hawken at Brands Hatch during the 2015 British Touring Car Championship season.
- Nationality: (United Kingdom) British
- Born: 3 January 1972 (age 54) Andover, Hampshire, UK

British Touring Car Championship career
- Debut season: 2015
- Current team: Support Our Paras Racing
- Car number: 84
- Starts: 3
- Wins: 0
- Poles: 0
- Fastest laps: 0
- Best finish: 35th in 2015

Previous series
- 2014 2007: HSCC Super Touring Car Trophy; Euro Saloon & Sports Car Championship

Richard Hawken (born 3 January 1972) is a British racing driver who most notably competed in the second round of the 2015 British Touring Car Championship at Donington Park.

== Racing career ==
Hawken began his career in karts at the age of 12 claiming the South of England Open championship at the age 14. He progressed into cars in 1991 aged 19 winning his first ever race in a Renault. In 2002, he purchased an RML built Vauxhall Cavalier entering the BARC Formula Saloons series. In 2004, he purchased an RML built Nissan Primera chassis No. 33 and continued to race in the BRSCC Euro Saloon & Sports Car Championship where he went on to win three championships, including the Super Touring Class.

In October 2014, it was announced that Hawken would make his British Touring Car Championship debut as a manufacturer driver with Infiniti Support Our Paras Racing driving an Infiniti Q50. However, after Infiniti withdrew their manufacturer support from the team amidst a change in top management in Dr. Andrew Palmer in mid 2015, he was replaced by Martin Donnelly.

In 2018, Hawken made his debut in the Porsche Carrera Cup GB driving with his lucky No. 84 on the car visiting the podium twice at Brands Hatch Indy and Brands Hatch GP circuits. He finished the AM Championship 4th.

Hawken returned to the Porsche Carrera Cup GB in 2019 but didn't finish the season due to his sponsorship having money issues.

== Racing record ==
=== Complete British Touring Car Championship results ===
(key) (Races in bold indicate pole position – 1 point awarded just in first race; races in italics indicate fastest lap – 1 point awarded all races; * signifies that driver led race for at least one lap – 1 point given all races)

Year	Team	Car	1	2	3	4	5	6	7	8	9	10	11	12	13	14	15	16	17	18	19	20	21	22	23	24	25	26	27	28	29	30	DC	Pts
2015	Support Our Paras Racing	Infiniti Q50	BRH; 1	BRH; 2	BRH; 3	DON; 1; 23	DON; 2; 24	DON; 3; 20	THR; 1	THR; 2	THR; 3	OUL; 1	OUL; 2	OUL; 3	CRO; 1	CRO; 2	CRO; 3	SNE; 1	SNE; 2	SNE; 3	KNO; 1	KNO; 2	KNO; 3	ROC; 1	ROC; 2	ROC; 3	SIL; 1	SIL; 2	SIL; 3	BRH; 1	BRH; 2	BRH; 3	35th	0
