= 2010 GT4 European Cup =

Seasons
- ← 2009 2011 →

The 2010 GT4 European Cup season was the fourth season of the GT4 European Cup. It began on May 1 at Silverstone, before finishing on October 17 at Magny-Cours after twelve races held at six meetings.

Rhesus Racing driver and single-seater convert Paul Meijer finished the season as the main GT4 champion – as well as securing the GT4 teams title, with team-mates Giuseppe De Pasquale and Raffaele Sangiulio – having finished each of the twelve races to be held on the podium. Meijer won a season-high five races during the season, including winning both races at the season-opening meeting at Silverstone, en route to a championship-winning margin of 27 points over RS Williams' Michael Mallock. Mallock finished a comfortable second after Matt Nicoll-Jones elected not to contest the final round of the season at Magny-Cours; Mallock won three races, while Nicoll-Jones won two – a double at the Nürburgring, after guest driver Ollie Hancock was ineligible to score points for a victory – for IMS Motorsport. Jordan Tresson and Elisäus-Ludwig Löfler shared fourth place despite not winning any races between him, with Alessandro Pier Guidi the only driver outside the top three drivers to win a race, winning both races at Le Castellet. Gianni Giudici won seven races to clinch the SuperSport class, ahead of four-time winner Anasthasios Ladas, who shared two of his wins with Kevin Veltman. Julian Griffin won the other race at the Nürburgring.

== Entry list ==
The entry list for the first round was released on 27 April 2010.

2010 entry list
Team	No.	Driver(s)	Class	Chassis	Engine	Rounds
(United Kingdom) RJN Motorsport	1	(United Kingdom) Alex Buncombe	GT4	Nissan 370Z GT4	Nissan 3.8L V6	1–4
(United Kingdom) RJN Motorsport	1	(France) Jordan Tresson	GT4	Nissan 370Z GT4	Nissan 3.8L V6	1–3
(United Kingdom) RJN Motorsport	1	(Germany) Ludo Löfler	GT4	Nissan 370Z GT4	Nissan 3.8L V6	4–6
(United Kingdom) RJN Motorsport	2	(Germany) Ludo Löfler	GT4	Nissan 350Z GT4	Nissan 3.5L V6	1–3
(United Kingdom) RJN Motorsport	2	(France) Jordan Tresson	GT4	Nissan 350Z GT4	Nissan 3.5L V6	4–6
(United Kingdom) RJN Motorsport	2	(United Kingdom) Rob Barff	GT4	Nissan 350Z GT4	Nissan 3.5L V6	4
(United Kingdom) RJN Motorsport	2	(United Kingdom) Alex Buncombe	GT4	Nissan 350Z GT4	Nissan 3.5L V6	6
(United Arab Emirates) AUH Racing	3	(United Kingdom) Eric Charles	GT4	Aston Martin GT4	Aston Martin 4.7L V8	2–4, 6
(United Arab Emirates) AUH Racing	4	(United Arab Emirates) Humaid Al Masaood	GT4	Aston Martin GT4	Aston Martin 4.7L V8	2–6
(United Arab Emirates) AUH Racing	4	(United Kingdom) Ollie Hancock	GT4	Aston Martin GT4	Aston Martin 4.7L V8	6
(France) Espace Bienvenue	6	(France) Pierre-Brice Mena	GT4	BMW M3 GT4	BMW 4.0L V8	1
(Netherlands) Rhesus Racing	7	(Netherlands) Paul Meijer	GT4	Aston Martin GT4	Aston Martin 4.7L V8	All
(Netherlands) Rhesus Racing	8	(Italy) Raffaele Sangiulio	GT4	Aston Martin GT4	Aston Martin 4.7L V8	1–3, 5–6
(Netherlands) Rhesus Racing	8	(Italy) Giuseppe de Pasquale	GT4	Aston Martin GT4	Aston Martin 4.7L V8	1–3, 5–6
(United Kingdom) IMS Motorsport	9	(United Kingdom) Matt Nicoll-Jones	GT4	Ginetta G50 Cup	Ford Cyclone 3.5L V6	1–5
(United Kingdom) IMS Motorsport	9	(United Kingdom) Hunter Abbott	GT4	Ginetta G50 Cup	Ford Cyclone 3.5L V6	1–3
(Belgium) Speedlover	10	(Belgium) Jürgen van Hover	GT4	Porsche 997 GT3	Porsche 3.6L Flat-6	2
(Netherlands) Porsche Eindhoven	12	(Netherlands) Paul van Splunteren	GT4	Porsche 997 GT3	Porsche 3.6L Flat-6	1
(Netherlands) Porsche Eindhoven	12	(Netherlands) Mathijs Harkema	GT4	Porsche 997 GT3	Porsche 3.6L Flat-6	1
(Belgium) DVB Racing	14	(Netherlands) Menno Kuus	GT4	BMW M3 GT4	BMW 4.0L V8	1–2
(Belgium) DVB Racing	14	(Belgium) Ruben Maes	GT4	BMW M3 GT4	BMW 4.0L V8	3
(Belgium) DVB Racing	14	(Belgium) Enzo Ide	GT4	BMW M3 GT4	BMW 4.0L V8	3
(Monaco) JMB Racing	15	(France) Edouard Gravereaux	GT4	Maserati GranTurismo MC	Maserati 4.7L V8	3
(Belgium) John Svenson	16	(Belgium) Albert Bloem	GT4	Aston Martin N24	Aston Martin 4.3L V8	2
(Belgium) John Svenson	16	(France) Jerôme Demay	GT4	Aston Martin N24	Aston Martin 4.3L V8	2
(Netherlands) Genpact Racing	17	(Netherlands) Kevin Veltman	GT4	BMW M3 GT4	BMW 4.0L V8	1–3
(United Kingdom) Speedworks	18	(United Kingdom) Christian Dick	GT4	Ginetta G50 Cup	Ford Cyclone 3.5L V6	1
(Italy) StarCars	19	(Italy) Andrea Gagliardini	GT4	Porsche Cayman S	Porsche 3.4L V6	2, 4, 6
(Italy) StarCars	19	(Italy) Maurizio Pittori	GT4	Porsche Cayman S	Porsche 3.4L V6	2, 4
(Italy) StarCars	19	(Italy) Marco Antonelli	GT4	Porsche Cayman S	Porsche 3.4L V6	6
(Italy) Scuderia Giudici	22	(United Kingdom) Ollie Hancock	GT4	Lotus Evora GT4	Toyota 4.0L V6	4
(Italy) Scuderia Giudici	211	(Italy) Gianni Giudici	SS	Lotus 2-Eleven	Toyota 1.8 L S/C I4	All
(Italy) Scuderia Giudici	212	(Italy) Marco Fumagalli	SS	Lotus 2-Eleven	Toyota 1.8 L S/C I4	4–6
(United Kingdom) Promotorsport	23	(United Kingdom) Derek Palmer Jr.	GT4	Nissan 350Z GT4	Nissan 3.5L V6	1
(United Kingdom) Promotorsport	23	(United Kingdom) Rick Pearson	GT4	Nissan 350Z GT4	Nissan 3.5L V6	1
(Germany) Mathol Racing	24	(Germany) Wolfgang Weber	GT4	Aston Martin GT4	Aston Martin 4.7L V8	2, 4
(Germany) Mathol Racing	27	(United States) Scott Preacher	GT4	Aston Martin GT4	Aston Martin 4.7L V8	4
(Germany) Mathol Racing	28	(Germany) Christian Bauer	GT4	Aston Martin GT4	Aston Martin 4.7L V8	4
(Italy) Maserati Corse	26	(Italy) Alessandro Pier Guidi	GT4	Maserati GranTurismo MC	Maserati 4.7L V8	3
(United Kingdom) Team LNT	30	(United Kingdom) Carl Breeze	GT4	Ginetta G50	Ford Cyclone 3.5L V6	4
(United Kingdom) Team LNT	30	(United Kingdom) Frank Wrathall	GT4	Ginetta G50	Ford Cyclone 3.5L V6	4
(United Kingdom) RS Williams	32	(United Kingdom) Michael Mallock	GT4	Aston Martin GT4	Aston Martin 4.7L V8	All
(Czech Republic) Develop Real Team	70	(Czech Republic) Jiri Gottwald	GT4	Ginetta G50	Ford Cyclone 3.5L V6	5–6
(Czech Republic) Develop Real Team	70	(Czech Republic) Eduard Leganov	GT4	Ginetta G50	Ford Cyclone 3.5L V6	5–6
(Greece) Ladas Racing	100	(Greece) Anasthasios Ladas	SS	KTM X-Bow	Volkswagen 2.0L Turbo I4	All
(Greece) Ladas Racing	100	(Netherlands) Kevin Veltman	SS	KTM X-Bow	Volkswagen 2.0L Turbo I4	4–6
(United Kingdom) Lotus Cars	213	(United Kingdom) Julian Griffin	SS	Lotus 2-Eleven	Toyota 1.8 L S/C I4	4
(United Kingdom) Lotus Cars	214	(Switzerland) Frédéric Gaillard	SS	Lotus 2-Eleven	Toyota 1.8 L S/C I4	4

Icon	Class
GT4	GT4 Class
SS	SuperSport Class

== Calendar ==
- A provisional calendar was released by the series on November 19, 2009.

Round	Circuit	Date	Pole position	GT4 winner	SS winner
1	(United Kingdom) Silverstone Circuit	May 1	#7 Rhesus Racing	#7 Rhesus Racing	#211 Scuderia Giudici
1	(United Kingdom) Silverstone Circuit	May 1	(Netherlands) Paul Meijer	(Netherlands) Paul Meijer	(Italy) Gianni Giudici
2	(United Kingdom) Silverstone Circuit	May 2	#7 Rhesus Racing	#7 Rhesus Racing	#100 Ladas Racing
2	(United Kingdom) Silverstone Circuit	May 2	(Netherlands) Paul Meijer	(Netherlands) Paul Meijer	(Greece) Anasthasios Ladas
3	(Belgium) Circuit de Spa-Francorchamps	June 5	#7 Rhesus Racing	#32 RS Williams	#211 Scuderia Giudici
3	(Belgium) Circuit de Spa-Francorchamps	June 5	(Netherlands) Paul Meijer	(United Kingdom) Michael Mallock	(Italy) Gianni Giudici
4	(Belgium) Circuit de Spa-Francorchamps	June 6	#7 Rhesus Racing	#7 Rhesus Racing	#211 Scuderia Giudici
4	(Belgium) Circuit de Spa-Francorchamps	June 6	(Netherlands) Paul Meijer	(Netherlands) Paul Meijer	(Italy) Gianni Giudici
5	(France) Circuit Paul Ricard	July 3	#26 Maserati Corse	#26 Maserati Corse	#211 Scuderia Giudici
5	(France) Circuit Paul Ricard	July 3	(Italy) Alessandro Pier Guidi	(Italy) Alessandro Pier Guidi	(Italy) Gianni Giudici
6	(France) Circuit Paul Ricard	July 4	#26 Maserati Corse	#26 Maserati Corse	#100 Ladas Racing
6	(France) Circuit Paul Ricard	July 4	(Italy) Alessandro Pier Guidi	(Italy) Alessandro Pier Guidi	(Greece) Anasthasios Ladas
7	(Germany) Nürburgring	August 28	#22 Scuderia Giudici	#22 Scuderia Giudici	#211 Scuderia Giudici
7	(Germany) Nürburgring	August 28	(United Kingdom) Ollie Hancock	(United Kingdom) Ollie Hancock	(Italy) Gianni Giudici
8	(Germany) Nürburgring	August 29	#7 Rhesus Racing	#9 IMS Motorsport	#213 Lotus Cars
8	(Germany) Nürburgring	August 29	(Netherlands) Paul Meijer	(United Kingdom) Matt Nicoll-Jones	(United Kingdom) Julian Griffin
9	(Portugal) Autódromo Internacional do Algarve, Portimão	September 18	#7 Rhesus Racing	#7 Rhesus Racing	#211 Scuderia Giudici
9	(Portugal) Autódromo Internacional do Algarve, Portimão	September 18	(Netherlands) Paul Meijer	(Netherlands) Paul Meijer	(Italy) Gianni Giudici
10	(Portugal) Autódromo Internacional do Algarve, Portimão	September 19	#7 Rhesus Racing	#32 RS Williams	#100 Ladas Racing
10	(Portugal) Autódromo Internacional do Algarve, Portimão	September 19	(Netherlands) Paul Meijer	(United Kingdom) Michael Mallock	(Greece) Anasthasios Ladas (Netherlands) Kevin Veltman
11	(France) Circuit de Nevers Magny-Cours	October 16	#7 Rhesus Racing	#7 Rhesus Racing	#211 Scuderia Giudici
11	(France) Circuit de Nevers Magny-Cours	October 16	(Netherlands) Paul Meijer	(Netherlands) Paul Meijer	(Italy) Gianni Giudici
12	(France) Circuit de Nevers Magny-Cours	October 17	#7 Rhesus Racing	#32 RS Williams	#100 Ladas Racing
12	(France) Circuit de Nevers Magny-Cours	October 17	(Netherlands) Paul Meijer	(United Kingdom) Michael Mallock	(Greece) Anasthasios Ladas (Netherlands) Kevin Veltman

== Championship standings ==
=== Drivers' Championship ===
Pos	Driver	Team	Rnd 1	Rnd 2	Rnd 3	Rnd 4	Rnd 5	Rnd 6	Rnd 7	Rnd 8	Rnd 9	Rnd 10	Rnd 11	Rnd 12	Total
GT4 Class
1	(Netherlands) Paul Meijer	(Netherlands) Rhesus Racing	10	10	8	10	8	6	8	8	10	8	10	8	104
2	(United Kingdom) Michael Mallock	(United Kingdom) RS Williams	8	8	10	6	6	0	6	6	1	10	6	10	77
3	(United Kingdom) Matt Nicoll-Jones	(United Kingdom) IMS Motorsport	3	3	5	2	5	8	10	10	8	6			60
4=	(France) Jordan Tresson	(United Kingdom) RJN Motorsport	0	0	2	1	3	0	0	0	6	4	8	3	27
4=	(Germany) Ludo Löfler	(United Kingdom) RJN Motorsport	0	2	4	3	4	0	4	0	5	5			27
5	(United Kingdom) Hunter Abbott	(United Kingdom) IMS Motorsport	3	3	5	2	5	8							26
6=	(Italy) Giuseppe De Pasquale	(Netherlands) Rhesus Racing	0	1	0	0	2	2			4	2	5	6	22
6=	(Italy) Raffaele Sangiulio	(Netherlands) Rhesus Racing	0	1	0	0	2	2			4	2	5	6	22
7	(United Kingdom) Alex Buncombe	(United Kingdom) RJN Motorsport	0	0	2	1	3	0	4	0			8	3	21
8=	(Italy) Alessandro Pier Guidi	(Italy) Maserati Corse					10	10							20
8=	(Netherlands) Kevin Veltman	(Netherlands) Genpact Racing	4	5	6	5									20
9	(United Arab Emirates) Humaid Al Masaood	(United Arab Emirates) AUH Racing			0	0	1	3	0	0	3	3	2	4	16
10	(Netherlands) Menno Kuus	(Belgium) DVB Racing	6	0	1	8									15
11=	(Czech Republic) Jiri Gottwald	(Czech Republic) Develop Real Team									2	1	3	5	11
11=	(Czech Republic) Eduard Leganov	(Czech Republic) Develop Real Team									2	1	3	5	11
12	(Germany) Wolfgang Weber	(Germany) Mathol Racing			0	0			5	5					10
13=	(France) Pierre-Brice Mena	(France) Espace Bienvenue	5	4											9
13=	(Italy) Andrea Gagliardini	(Italy) StarCars			0	0			2	3			4	0	9
14=	(United Kingdom) Carl Breeze	(United Kingdom) Team LNT							3	4					7
14=	(United Kingdom) Frank Wrathall	(United Kingdom) Team LNT							3	4					7
15=	(United Kingdom) Christian Dick	(United Kingdom) Speedworks	0	6											6
15=	(United Kingdom) Ollie Hancock	(United Arab Emirates) AUH Racing											2	4	6
16=	(Belgium) Enzo Ide	(Belgium) DVB Racing					0	5							5
16=	(Belgium) Ruben Maes	(Belgium) DVB Racing					0	5							5
16=	(United Kingdom) Eric Charles	(United Arab Emirates) AUH Racing			0	0	0	4	0	0			1	0	5
16=	(Italy) Maurizio Pittori	(Italy) StarCars			0	0			2	3					5
17	(Italy) Marco Antonelli	(Italy) StarCars											4	0	4
18=	(Belgium) Jürgen van Hover	(Belgium) Speedlover			3	0									3
18=	(Germany) Christian Bauer	(Germany) Mathol Racing							1	2					3
19=	(Netherlands) Mathijs Harkema	(Netherlands) Porsche Eindhoven	2	0											2
19=	(Netherlands) Paul van Splunteren	(Netherlands) Porsche Eindhoven	2	0											2
20=	(United Kingdom) Derek Palmer Jr.	(United Kingdom) Promotorsport	1	0											1
20=	(United Kingdom) Rick Pearson	(United Kingdom) Promotorsport	1	0											1
20=	(France) Edouard Gravereaux	(Monaco) JMB Racing					0	1							1
20=	(United States) Scott Preacher	(Germany) Mathol Racing							0	1					1
SuperSport Class
1	(Italy) Gianni Giudici	(Italy) Scuderia Giudici	10	8	10	10	10	8	10	4	10	8	10	6	104
2	(Greece) Anasthasios Ladas	(Greece) Ladas Racing	8	10	8	8	8	10	5	6	6	10	8	10	97
3	(Netherlands) Kevin Veltman	(Greece) Ladas Racing							5	6	6	10	8	10	45
4	(Italy) Marco Fumagalli	(Italy) Scuderia Giudici							4	5	8	6	6	8	37
5	(United Kingdom) Julian Griffin	(United Kingdom) Lotus Cars							8	10					18
6	(Switzerland) Frédéric Gaillard	(United Kingdom) Lotus Cars							6	8					14

=== Teams' Championship ===
Pos	Team	Rnd 1	Rnd 2	Rnd 3	Rnd 4	Rnd 5	Rnd 6	Rnd 7	Rnd 8	Rnd 9	Rnd 10	Rnd 11	Rnd 12	Total
1	(Netherlands) Rhesus Racing	10	11	8	10	10	8	8	8	14	10	15	14	126
2	(United Kingdom) RS Williams	8	8	10	6	6	0	6	6	1	10	6	10	77
3	(United Kingdom) IMS Motorsport	3	3	5	2	5	8	10	10	8	6			60
4	(United Kingdom) RJN Motorsport	0	2	6	4	7	0	4	0	11	9	8	3	54
5	(United Arab Emirates) AUH Racing			0	0	1	7	0	0	3	3	3	4	21
6=	(Italy) Maserati Corse					10	10							20
6=	(Belgium) DVB Racing	6	0	1	8	0	5							20
6=	(Netherlands) Genpact Racing	4	5	6	5									20
7	(Germany) Mathol Racing			0	4			6	8					18
8	(Czech Republic) Develop Real Team									2	1	3	5	11
9=	(France) Espace Bienvenue	5	4											9
9=	(Italy) StarCars			0	0			2	3			4	0	9
10	(United Kingdom) Team LNT							3	4					7
11	(United Kingdom) Speedworks	0	6											6
12	(Belgium) Speedlover			3	0									3
13	(Netherlands) Porsche Eindhoven	2	0											2
14=	(United Kingdom) Promotorsport	1	0											1
14=	(Monaco) JMB Racing					0	1							1
