= 2009 GT4 European Cup =

Seasons
- ← 2008 2010 →

The 2009 GT4 European Cup season was the third season of the GT4 European Cup. It began on May 3 at Silverstone, before finishing on September 13 at Portimao after twelve races.

== Entry list ==
2009 Entry List
Team	No.	Driver(s)	Class	Car	Rounds
(Belgium) Motorsport 98	1	(Belgium) Eric De Doncker	GT4	Ford Mustang FR500C	1
(Belgium) Motorsport 98	1	(Belgium) Francois Kicq	GT4	Ford Mustang FR500C	1
(Italy) Giudici Sports	1	(Italy) Gianni Giudici	GT4	Maserati Trofeo	4
(Italy) Giudici Sports	2	(Italy) Andrea Perlini	GT4	Maserati Trofeo	4
(Russia) Alexander Pugachev	3	(Russia) Alexander Pugachev	GT4	Aston Martin V8 Vantage N24	All
(Germany) Callaway Competition	4	(Germany) Tobias Guttroff	GT4	Chevrolet Corvette C6	2–6
(Germany) Callaway Competition	4	(Germany) Jens Richter	GT4	Chevrolet Corvette C6	2–6
(United Kingdom) GCR	5	(United Kingdom) Tom Dunstan	GT4	Ginetta G50	1–2, 4–5
(United Kingdom) GCR	5	(United Kingdom) Matt Hamilton	GT4	Ginetta G50	1
(United Kingdom) GCR	5	(United Kingdom) Joe Osborne	GT4	Ginetta G50	4
(United Kingdom) Rob Austin Racing	6	(United Kingdom) Hunter Abbott	GT4	Ginetta G50	All
(United Kingdom) Rob Austin Racing	6	(United Kingdom) Henry Fletcher	GT4	Ginetta G50	All
(Belgium) Ice Pol Race Team	8	(Belgium) Maxime Soulet	GT4	Porsche Cayman	5
(Belgium) Ice Pol Race Team	8	(Belgium) Maarten Makelderge	GT4	Porsche Cayman	5
(Belgium) Ice Pol Race Team	55	(Belgium) Maxime Martin	GT4	Porsche 997 GT3	3–5
(Belgium) Ice Pol Race Team	55	(Belgium) Ludovic Sougnez	GT4	Porsche 997 GT3	3–5
(Netherlands) Porsche Zentrum Eindhoven	11	(Brazil) Roberto Aranha	GT4	Porsche 997 GT3	6
(Netherlands) Porsche Zentrum Eindhoven	12	(Brazil) Walter Salles	GT4	Porsche 997 GT3	2–3
(Netherlands) Porsche Zentrum Eindhoven	12	(Italy) Mauro Casadei	GT4	Porsche 997 GT3	2
(Netherlands) Porsche Zentrum Eindhoven	12	(Netherlands) Tom Langeberg	GT4	Porsche 997 GT3	3
(United Kingdom) RJN Motorsport	14	(United Kingdom) Alex Buncombe	GT4	Nissan 350Z	All
(United Kingdom) RJN Motorsport	14	(Spain) Lucas Ordóñez	GT4	Nissan 350Z	All
(Belgium) Raphael van der Straaten	16	(Belgium) Raphael van der Straaten	GT4	Ford Mustang FR500C	4
(Netherlands) Genpact Racing	17	(Netherlands) Kevin Veltman	GT4	BMW M3 GT4	All
(France) Espace Bienvenue	18	(France) Pierre Brice-Mena	GT4	BMW M3 GT4	All
(France) Espace Bienvenue	18	(France) André Grammatico	GT4	BMW M3 GT4	1, 3–4
(United Kingdom) Promotorsport	23	(United Kingdom) Rick Pearson	GT4	Nissan 350Z	3
(United Kingdom) Promotorsport	23	(United Kingdom) Derek Palmer	GT4	Nissan 350Z	3
(United Kingdom) Vantage Racing	24	(United Kingdom) Tom Black	GT4	Aston Martin V8 Vantage N24	1
(United Kingdom) RS Williams	32	(United Kingdom) Michael Mallock	GT4	Aston Martin V8 Vantage N24	All
(Italy) AF Corse	40	(Italy) Lorenzo Casè	GT4	Maserati GranTurismo	4–5
(Italy) AF Corse	40	(Monaco) Cédric Sbirrazzuoli	GT4	Maserati GranTurismo	4
(Czech Republic) Techfuture SRO	44	(Czech Republic) Vladimir Hladik	GT4	Aston Martin V8 Vantage N24	1, 3–6
(United Kingdom) Team WFR	50	(United Kingdom) Nigel Moore	GT4	Ginetta G50	1, 5
(United Kingdom) Team WFR	50	(United Kingdom) Jody Firth	GT4	Ginetta G50	1
(United Kingdom) Team WFR	50	(United Kingdom) Joe Osborne	GT4	Ginetta G50	5
(United Kingdom) Team LNT	51	(United Kingdom) Stuart Linn	GT4	Ginetta G50	1
(United Kingdom) Team LNT	51	(United Kingdom) Mike Simpson	GT4	Ginetta G50	1
(Netherlands) Donkervoort	102	(France) Stephane Wintenberger	SS	Donkervoort D8 GT	1–2, 5–6
(Netherlands) Donkervoort	103	(Netherlands) Denis Donkervoort	SS	Donkervoort D8 GT	All
(Netherlands) Donkervoort	104	(Netherlands) Nico Pronk	SS	Donkervoort D8 GT	All
(Austria) Red Wolves Racing	108	(Austria) Augustin Eder	SS	KTM X-Bow	All
(Greece) Ladas Racing	109	(Greece) Anasthasios Ladas	SS	KTM X-Bow	3–6
(Greece) Ladas Racing	109	(Germany) Wolfang Weber	SS	KTM X-Bow	6
(France) Olivier Freymuth	140	(France) Olivier Freymuth	SS	Peugeot THP Spider	3

Icon	Class
GT4	GT4 Class
SS	SuperSport Class

== Championship standings ==
=== GT4 ===
Pos	Driver	SIL (United Kingdom)		ADR (Italy)		OSC (Germany)		SPA (Belgium)		ZOL (Belgium)		ALG (Portugal)		Pts
1	(United Kingdom) Joe Osborne	2	1	1	3	6	DSQ	4	7	4	5	2	4	66
2	(United Kingdom) Alex Buncombe	6	3	6	Ret	2	2	13	2	1	Ret	Ret	1	57
2	(Spain) Lucas Ordóñez	6	3	6	Ret	2	2	13	2	1	Ret	Ret	1	57
3	(France) Pierre Brice-Mena	9	Ret	2	1	5	3	DSQ	3	5	Ret	1	3	56
4	(United Kingdom) Michael Mallock	Ret	Ret	7	Ret	3	6	1	1	2	3	12	2	55
5	(Netherlands) Kevin Weltman	8	4	4	5	4	4	12	5	7	7			36
6	(United Kingdom) Hunter Abbott	4	7	3	Ret	10	5	3	4	6	8	13	Ret	35
6	(United Kingdom) Henry Fletcher	4	7	3	Ret	10	5	3	4	6	8	13	Ret	35
7	(Belgium) Maxime Martin					1	1	14	Ret	15	1			30
7	(Belgium) Ludovic Sougnez					1	1	14	Ret	15	1			30
8	(United Kingdom) Tom Dunstan	Ret	5	5	Ret			4	7	Ret	2			23
9	(Italy) Lorenzo Casè							2	6	3	4			22
10	(Czech Republic) Vladimir Hladik	5	6			9	9	6	8	8	10	11	6	22
11	(United Kingdom) Nigel Moore	1	Ret							4	5			19
12	(United Kingdom) Michael Broadhurst	2	1											18
13	(Russia) Alexander Pugachev	11	9	8	4	7	10	15	11	9	13	4	7	16
14	(Monaco) Cédric Sbirrazzuoli							2	6					11
15	(United Kingdom) Jody Firth	1	Ret											10
16	(Brazil) Roberto Aranha											5	5	9
17	(Italy) Mauro Casadei			10	2									8
18	(United Kingdom) Stewart Linn	DNS	2											8
18	(United Kingdom) Mike Simpson	DNS	2											8
19	(Germany) Tobias Guttroff			14	6	12	11	9	15	10	11	7	Ret	8
19	(Germany) Jens Richter			14	6	12	11	9	15	10	11	7	Ret	8
20	(United Kingdom) Matt Hamilton	Ret	5											4
21	(United Kingdom) Derek Palmer Jr.	10	8	12	Ret	16	8							4
21	(United Kingdom) Rick Pearson	10	8	12	Ret	16	8							4
22	(Belgium) Raphael van der Straten							7	9					3
23	(Italy) Gianni Giudici							8	Ret					2
24	(France) André Grammatico	9	Ret											2
25	(Netherlands) Tom Langeberg					8	15							1
26	(Italy) Andrea Perlini							11	13					0
27	(United Kingdom) Tom Black	12	DNS											0
28	(Belgium) Eric De Doncker	15	DNS											0
28	(Belgium) Francois Kicq	15	DNS											0
Guest driver ineligible for points
–	(Brazil) Walter Salles			10	2	8	15							0
Pos	Driver	SIL (United Kingdom)		ADR (Italy)		OSC (Germany)		SPA (Belgium)		ZOL (Belgium)		ALG (Portugal)		Pts

=== Supersport ===
Pos	Driver	SIL (United Kingdom)		ADR (Italy)		OSC (Germany)		SPA (Belgium)		ZOL (Belgium)		ALG (Portugal)		Pts
1	(Austria) Augustin Eder	13	10	13	7	13	13	10	12	12	12	9	12	85
2	(Netherlands) Denis Donkervoort	3	Ret	11	DNS	Ret	8	5	10	Ret	6	3	9	76
3	(France) Stéphane Wintenberger	7	Ret	9	Ret					11	9	6	8	54
4	(Netherlands) Nico Pronk	14	11	15	Ret	15	16	Ret	Ret	14	15	10	11	45
5	(Greece) Athanasios Ladas					14	14	Ret	14	13	14	8	10	40
6	(Germany) Oliver Freymuth					11	12							18
7	(Germany) Wolfgang Weber											8	10	12
Pos	Driver	SIL (United Kingdom)		ADR (Italy)		OSC (Germany)		SPA (Belgium)		ZOL (Belgium)		ALG (Portugal)		Pts
