= 2018 TCR UK Touring Car Championship =

The 2018 TCR UK Touring Car Championship was the first season of the TCR UK Touring Car Championship, promoted by the British Racing and Sports Car Club. The season began on 1 April at Silverstone Circuit and ended on 14 October at Donington Park. The Driver's Champion was Daniel Lloyd, and the Team Champions were WestCoast Racing.

== Teams and drivers ==
Team	Car	No.	Drivers	Rounds
(Switzerland) Wolf-Power Racing	Renault Mégane TCR	5	(United Kingdom) Alex Morgan	3
(United Kingdom) Verizon Connect Racing	Honda Civic Type R TCR (FK8)	8	(United Kingdom) Finlay Crocker	1–4, 6–7
(United Kingdom) Verizon Connect Racing	Honda Civic Type R TCR (FK8)	88	(United Kingdom) Ashley Sutton	5
(United Kingdom) Pyro Motorsport	Honda Civic Type R TCR (FK8)	32	(United Kingdom) Oliver Taylor	3–7
(United Kingdom) Pyro Motorsport	Honda Civic Type R TCR (FK2)	32	(United Kingdom) Oliver Taylor	1–2
(United Kingdom) JP Racing	Honda Civic Type R TCR (FK2)	28	(United Kingdom) Josh Price	7
(United Kingdom) BMR Autoglym Academy	Honda Civic Type R TCR (FK2)	28	(United Kingdom) Josh Price	2–3
(United Kingdom) Laser Tools Racing	Alfa Romeo Giulietta TCR	16	(United Kingdom) Aiden Moffat	1–2
(United Kingdom) Laser Tools Racing	Alfa Romeo Giulietta TCR	61	(United Kingdom) Derek Palmer Jr.	1–2
(United Kingdom) DPE Motorsport	Alfa Romeo Giulietta TCR	61	(United Kingdom) Derek Palmer Jr.	3–5
(United Kingdom) DPE Motorsport	Alfa Romeo Giulietta TCR	76	(United Kingdom) Robert Gilmour	3–5
(Sweden) WestCoast Racing	Honda Civic Type R TCR (FK2)	19	(Sweden) Andreas Bäckman	6
(Sweden) WestCoast Racing	Volkswagen Golf GTI TCR	19	(Sweden) Andreas Bäckman	1–5, 7
(Sweden) WestCoast Racing	Volkswagen Golf GTI TCR	23	(United Kingdom) Daniel Lloyd	All
(Sweden) WestCoast Racing	Volkswagen Golf GTI TCR	26	(Sweden) Jessica Bäckman	All
(United Kingdom) Maximum Motorsport	Volkswagen Golf GTI TCR	27	(United Kingdom) Tim Docker	5
(United Kingdom) Maximum Motorsport	CUPRA León TCR	95	(United Kingdom) Stewart Lines	1, 3–7
(United Kingdom) Maximum Motorsport	CUPRA León TCR	45	(United Kingdom) Carl Swift	3–5, 7
(United Kingdom) Endurance Financial Racing	CUPRA León TCR	45	(United Kingdom) Carl Swift	1
(United Kingdom) Essex & Kent Motorsport	Hyundai i30 N TCR	38	(United Kingdom) Lewis Kent	All
(Finland) LMS Racing	CUPRA León TCR	44	(Finland) Olli Parhankangas	1
(United Kingdom) DW Racing	Vauxhall Astra TCR	50	(United Kingdom) Darelle Wilson	1–4, 6–7
(United Kingdom) Sean Walkinshaw Racing	Honda Civic Type R TCR (FK2)	55	(United Kingdom) Sean Walkinshaw	2, 7
(United Kingdom) Sean Walkinshaw Racing	Honda Civic Type R TCR (FK2)	65	(United Kingdom) Howard Fuller	1, 3

== Calendar and results ==
The 2018 schedule consisted of seven race weekends with two races each weekend, with the grid for Race 1 being determined by a traditional qualifying session. The grid for Race 2 will be made up by reversing the top 10 from the second fastest qualifying lap. The calendar was announced on 13 September 2017.

Round		Circuit	Date	Pole position	Fastest lap	Winning driver	Winning team
1	1	Silverstone Circuit, Northamptonshire	1 April	(United Kingdom) Daniel Lloyd	(Sweden) Andreas Bäckman	(United Kingdom) Daniel Lloyd	(Sweden) WestCoast Racing
1	2	Silverstone Circuit, Northamptonshire	1 April		(United Kingdom) Daniel Lloyd	(United Kingdom) Daniel Lloyd	(Sweden) WestCoast Racing
2	3	Knockhill Racing Circuit (Reverse Direction), Fife	13 May	(United Kingdom) Daniel Lloyd	(United Kingdom) Aiden Moffat	(United Kingdom) Daniel Lloyd	(Sweden) WestCoast Racing
2	4	Knockhill Racing Circuit (Reverse Direction), Fife	13 May		(United Kingdom) Josh Price	(United Kingdom) Daniel Lloyd	(Sweden) WestCoast Racing
3	5	Brands Hatch, Kent	3 June	(United Kingdom) Daniel Lloyd	(United Kingdom) Daniel Lloyd	(United Kingdom) Daniel Lloyd	(Sweden) WestCoast Racing
3	6	Brands Hatch, Kent	3 June		(Sweden) Andreas Bäckman	(United Kingdom) Daniel Lloyd	(Sweden) WestCoast Racing
4	7	Castle Combe Circuit, Wiltshire	15 July	(United Kingdom) Oliver Taylor	(United Kingdom) Daniel Lloyd	(United Kingdom) Oliver Taylor	(United Kingdom) Pyro Motorsport
4	8	Castle Combe Circuit, Wiltshire	15 July		(United Kingdom) Daniel Lloyd	(United Kingdom) Daniel Lloyd	(Sweden) WestCoast Racing
5	9	Oulton Park, Cheshire	4 August	(United Kingdom) Ashley Sutton	(United Kingdom) Ashley Sutton	(United Kingdom) Ashley Sutton	(United Kingdom) Verizon Connect Racing
5	10	Oulton Park, Cheshire	4 August		(United Kingdom) Stewart Lines	(United Kingdom) Ashley Sutton	(United Kingdom) Verizon Connect Racing
6	11	Croft Circuit, North Yorkshire	9 September	(Sweden) Andreas Bäckman	(Sweden) Andreas Bäckman	(Sweden) Andreas Bäckman	(Sweden) WestCoast Racing
6	12	Croft Circuit, North Yorkshire	9 September		(United Kingdom) Lewis Kent	(United Kingdom) Oliver Taylor	(United Kingdom) Pyro Motorsport
7	13	Donington Park, Leicestershire	14 October	(United Kingdom) Daniel Lloyd	(United Kingdom) Daniel Lloyd	(United Kingdom) Daniel Lloyd	(Sweden) WestCoast Racing
7	14	Donington Park, Leicestershire	14 October		(United Kingdom) Josh Price	(United Kingdom) Josh Price	(United Kingdom) JP Racing

== Championship standings ==
=== Drivers' championship ===
Points system
Position	1st	2nd	3rd	4th	5th	6th	7th	8th	9th	10th	11th	12th	13th	14th	15th	16th	17th	18th	19th	20th
Race	40	35	30	25	21	19	17	15	13	11	10	9	8	7	6	5	4	3	2	1
Qualifying	11	9	8	7	6	5	4	3	2	1										

Pos	Driver	SIL		KNO		BHI		CAS		OUL		CRO		DON		Points
Pos	Driver	RD1	RD2	RD1	RD2	RD1	RD2	RD1	RD2	RD1	RD2	RD1	RD2	RD1	RD2	Points
1	(United Kingdom) Daniel Lloyd	1^{1}	1	1^{1}	1	1^{1}	1	2^{2}	1	2^{2}	4	3^{4}	Ret	1^{1}	3	514
2	(United Kingdom) Oliver Taylor	3^{5}	3	2^{3}	Ret	2^{2}	5	1^{1}	2	8^{3}	2	2^{2}	1	4^{4}	6	453
3	(Sweden) Andreas Bäckman	4^{8}	2	4^{4}	5	6^{3}	Ret	3^{3}	4	3^{4}	8	1^{1}	3	2^{2}	4	408
4	(Sweden) Jessica Bäckman	8^{10}	6	7^{8}	6	4^{5}	2	6^{4}	Ret	6^{7}	5	5^{5}	4	6^{3}	5	300
5	(United Kingdom) Lewis Kent	11^{4}	11	Ret^{7}	8	3^{4}	7	4^{5}	6	5^{8}	3	6^{7}	6	8^{9}	9	278
6	(United Kingdom) Stewart Lines	9	8			5^{9}	4	Ret^{8}	DSQ	7^{6}	6	7^{3}	5	5^{5}	2	208
7	(United Kingdom) Finlay Crocker	6	9	Ret^{6}	Ret	7^{7}	Ret	Ret^{6}	DNS			4^{6}	2	3^{7}	7	179
8	(United Kingdom) Carl Swift	10^{6}	10			8^{10}	Ret	5^{7}	3	Ret^{10}	DNS			7^{8}	8	132
9	(United Kingdom) Josh Price			3^{5}	2	9^{6}	Ret							Ret^{10}	1	130
10	(United Kingdom) Darelle Wilson	Ret^{7}	7	8^{9}	4	11	6	DNS^{10}	DNS			Ret^{8}	DNS	DNS^{6}	DNS	101
11	(United Kingdom) Derek Palmer Jr.	Ret	12	6	7	DNS	DNS	Ret^{9}	5	4^{5}	Ret					99
12	(United Kingdom) Howard Fuller	5^{3}	4			10	3									95
13	(United Kingdom) Ashley Sutton									1^{1}	1					91
14	(United Kingdom) Sean Walkinshaw			5^{10}	3									9	10	76
15	(United Kingdom) Aiden Moffat	2^{2}	Ret	Ret^{2}	DNS											53
16	(Finland) Olli Kangas	7^{9}	5													40
17	(United Kingdom) Tim Docker									9	7					30
18	(United Kingdom) Robert Gilmour					DNS^{8}	DNS	DNS	DNS	DSQ^{9}	EX					-15
NC	(United Kingdom) Alex Morgan					Ret	Ret									–
Pos	Driver	SIL		KNO		BHI		CAS		OUL		CRO		DON		Points

=== Teams' Championship ===
Pos	Team	SIL		KNO		BHI		CAS		OUL		CRO		DON		Points
Pos	Team	RD1	RD2	RD1	RD2	RD1	RD2	RD1	RD2	RD1	RD2	RD1	RD2	RD1	RD2	Points
1	(Sweden) WestCoast Racing	1^{1}	1	1^{1}	1	1^{1}	1	2^{2}	1	2^{2}	4	1^{1}	3	1^{1}	3	984
1	(Sweden) WestCoast Racing	4^{8}	2	4^{4}	5	4^{5}	2	3^{3}	4	3^{4}	5	3^{4}	4	2^{2}	4	984
2	(United Kingdom) Pyro Motorsport	3^{5}	3	2^{3}	Ret	2^{2}	5	1^{1}	2	8^{3}	2	2^{2}	1	4^{4}	6	458
3	(United Kingdom) Maximum Motorsport	9	8			5^{9}	4	5^{7}	3	7^{6}	6	7^{3}	5	5^{5}	2	367
3	(United Kingdom) Maximum Motorsport					8^{10}	Ret	Ret^{8}	DSQ	9	7			7^{8}	8	367
4	(United Kingdom) Essex & Kent Motorsport	11^{4}	11	Ret^{7}	8	3^{4}	7	4^{5}	6	5^{8}	3	6^{7}	6	8^{9}	9	292
5	(United Kingdom) Verizon Connect Racing	6	9	Ret^{6}	Ret	7^{7}	Ret	Ret^{6}	DNS	1^{1}	1	4^{6}	2	3^{7}	7	281
6	(United Kingdom) Sean Walkinshaw Racing	5^{3}	4	5^{10}	3	10	3							9	10	180
7	(United Kingdom) Laser Tools Racing / DPE Motorsport	2^{2}	12	6	7	DNS^{8}	DNS	Ret^{9}	5	4^{5}	Ret					144
7	(United Kingdom) Laser Tools Racing / DPE Motorsport	Ret	Ret	Ret^{2}	DNS	DNS	DNS	DNS	DNS	DSQ^{9}	EX					144
8	(United Kingdom) BMR Autoglym Academy / JP Racing			3^{5}	2	9^{6}	Ret							Ret^{10}	1	134
9	(United Kingdom) DW Racing	Ret^{7}	7	8^{9}	4	11	6	DNS^{10}	DNS			Ret^{8}	DNS	DNS^{6}	DNS	110
10	(Finland) LMS Racing	7^{9}	5													40
11	(United Kingdom) Endurance Financial Racing	10^{6}	10													31
NC	(Switzerland) Wolf-Power Racing					Ret	Ret									–
Pos	Team	SIL		KNO		BHI		CAS		OUL		CRO		DON		Points
