= 2008 Mini Challenge UK =

Motor racing competition

Seasons
- ← 2007 2009 →

The 2008 Mini Challenge season was the seventh season of the Mini Challenge UK. The season started on 27 April at Snetterton Motor Racing Circuit and ended on 28 September at Rockingham Motor Speedway. The season featured seven rounds across the UK.

== Calendar ==
Round		Circuit	Date
1	R1	Snetterton Motor Racing Circuit	26–27 April
1	R2	Snetterton Motor Racing Circuit	26–27 April
1	R3	Snetterton Motor Racing Circuit	26–27 April
2	R4	Pembrey Circuit	10–11 May
2	R5	Pembrey Circuit	10–11 May
2	R6	Pembrey Circuit	10–11 May
2	R7	Pembrey Circuit	10–11 May
3	R8	Croft Circuit	14–15 June
3	R9	Croft Circuit	14–15 June
4	R10	Castle Combe	19–20 July
4	R11	Castle Combe	19–20 July
4	R12	Castle Combe	19–20 July
5	R13	Donington Park	2–3 August
5	R14	Donington Park	2–3 August
5	R15	Donington Park	2–3 August
6	R16	Brands Hatch	24–25 August
6	R17	Brands Hatch	24–25 August
7	R18	Rockingham Motor Speedway	27–28 September
7	R19	Rockingham Motor Speedway	27–28 September
7	R20	Rockingham Motor Speedway	27–28 September

== Entry list ==
Team	No.	Driver	Rounds
Cooper S Class
Maximum Motorsport	2	(United Kingdom) Gary Kounnis	All
Maximum Motorsport	3	(United Kingdom) Steve Woods	1
Maximum Motorsport	5	(United Kingdom) Stewart Lines	1, 3–5
Coastal Racing	6	(United Kingdom) Jake Packun	1–6
Coastal Racing	9	(United Kingdom) James Williams	1–6
Coastal Racing	9	(United Kingdom) Carl Bradley	7
Coastal Racing	23	(United Kingdom) Chris Panayiotou	3–7
Coastal Racing	69	(United Kingdom) Ant Scragg	All
Forster Motorsport	7	(United Kingdom) Arthur Forster	1–6
Forster Motorsport	7	(United Kingdom) Steve Meli	7
Forster Motorsport	8	(Denmark) Joachim Ritter	2
Forster Motorsport	8	(United Kingdom) Andrew Bailey	4–7
Forster Motorsport	12	(United Kingdom) Jack Stanford	All
Forster Motorsport	30	(United Kingdom) Martin Depper	All
Forster Motorsport	66	(United Kingdom) Steve Liquorish	All
Mini Motorsport	14	(United Kingdom) Shaun King	4–5
Advent Motorsport	16	(United Kingdom) Mark Drury	5
OX4 Racing	51	(United Kingdom) Richard Miller	5–6
Redline Racing	77	(United Kingdom) Jason Greatrex	1
Malvern Motorsport	99	(United Kingdom) Andy Beever	1–6
Cooper Class
Advent Motorsport	4	(United Kingdom) Antony Williams	All
Advent Motorsport	15	(United Kingdom) Chris Mohan	1
Advent Motorsport	15	(United Kingdom) Kristian White	3
Advent Motorsport	17	(United Kingdom) Joel Wroe-Johnson	1–2
Advent Motorsport	93	(United Kingdom) Joel Wroe-Johnson	3–7
Advent Motorsport	19	(United Kingdom) Sarah Parsons	All
Advent Motorsport	20	(United Kingdom) Graham Parsons	All
Advent Motorsport	42	(United Kingdom) Dawn Boyd	All
Advent Motorsport	76	(United Kingdom) Peter Slevin	1, 7
Advent Motorsport	76	(United Kingdom) Arthur Williams	2
Advent Motorsport	76	(United Kingdom) Tim Crighton	3–4
Privateer	10	(United Kingdom) Michelle Nixon	1–6
Privateer	18	(United Kingdom) Nina-Jo Atkinson	All
Privateer	22	(United Kingdom) Rebecca Nuttall	1–2
Privateer	33	(United Kingdom) Craig Dawson	4–7
Robershaw Racing	31	(United Kingdom) Keith Issatt	All
Waddington Motorsport	35	(United Kingdom) Josh Waddington	All
Waddington Motorsport	79	(United Kingdom) Aston Blake	All
Mark Fish Motorsport	65	(United Kingdom) Jason Richardson	5–7

== Championship standings ==
Scoring system

Championship points were awarded for the first 15 positions in each Championship Race. Entries were required to complete 75% of the winning car's race distance in order to be classified and earn points. There were bonus points awarded for Pole Position and Fastest Lap.

Championship Race points

Position	1st	2nd	3rd	4th	5th	6th	7th	8th	9th	10th	11th	12th	13th	14th	15th
Points	20	17	15	13	11	10	9	8	7	6	5	4	3	2	1

=== Drivers' Championship ===
==== Cooper S Class ====
Pos	Driver	SNE			PEM				CRO		CAS			DON			BHI		ROC			Pts
1	(United Kingdom) Martin Depper	2	2	1	1	2	4	2	3	2	3	1	1	2	3	5	1	Ret	2	2	2	331
2	(United Kingdom) Jack Stanford	1	1	3	6	3	8	3	2	3	2	2	2	5	5	1	3	1	1	1	1	330
3	(United Kingdom) Jake Packun	10	5	4	2	4	2	1	1	1	6	12	8	3	1	2	2	Ret				232
4	(United Kingdom) Andy Beever	5	4	5	4	7	3	5	4	5	8	9	9	6	2	4	10	3				192
5	(United Kingdom) Steve Liquorish	9	9	9	8	8	5	4	7	6	9	8	11	8	8	8	8	6	4	6	4	178
6	(United Kingdom) Ant Scragg	4	3	Ret	9	5	6	Ret	5	4	Ret	5	10	4	9	3	Ret	2	5	7	DNS	169
7	(United Kingdom) Gary Kounnis	6	7	8	5	6	10	7	Ret	DNS	11	3	5	7	4	10	5	5	7	Ret	5	164
8	(United Kingdom) Arthur Forster	3	Ret	2	3	1	1	9	Ret	DNS	1	Ret	3	Ret	DNS	DNS	Ret	Ret				135
9	(United Kingdom) James Williams	8	10	7	7	9	7	6	8	Ret	4	11	4	Ret	10	9	4	9				130
10	(United Kingdom) Chris Panayiotou								9	8	10	7	7	9	6	11	6	4	6	8	DNS	102
11	(United Kingdom) Shaun King										7	4	6	1	Ret	6						62
12	(United Kingdom) Stewart Lines	Ret	Ret	Ret					6	7	5	6	Ret	12	13	7						56
13	(United Kingdom) Andrew Bailey										Ret	10	Ret	10	7	12	7	7	Ret	5	Ret	54
14	(United Kingdom) Steve Meli																		3	3	3	46
15	(United Kingdom) Steve Wood	7	8	6																		27
16	(Denmark) Joachim Ritter				10	10	9	9														27
17	(United Kingdom) Richard Miller													11	11	14	9	8				27
18	(United Kingdom) Jason Greatrex	11	6	DNS																		15
19	(United Kingdom) Carl Bradley																		DNS	4	DNS	13
20	(United Kingdom) Mark Drury													Ret	12	13						7

==== Cooper Class ====
Pos	Driver	SNE			PEM				CRO		CAS			DON			BHI		ROC			Pts
1	(United Kingdom) Graham Parsons	2	Ret	Ret	Ret	DNS	4	1	2	2	1	1	1	1	2	2	1	3	5	5	7	273
2	(United Kingdom) Keith Issatt	3	1	2	2	1	Ret	9	1	3	6	3	3	6	DSQ	10	7	4	4	4	5	247
3	(United Kingdom) Josh Waddington	4	6	9	5	4	5	10	3	4	10	7	5	2	5	3	4	9	3	2	1	240
4	(United Kingdom) Joel Wroe-Johnson	6	2	4	1	2	3	3	9	11	3	5	Ret	Ret	Ret	6	6	6	2	3	2	228
5	(United Kingdom) Antony Williams	1	5	1	7	7	Ret	4	7	9	5	6	4	3	3	4	2	2	7	Ret	Ret	226
6	(United Kingdom) Aston Blake	DNS	3	8	6	9	2	6	Ret	7	4	12	8	5	4	5	5	5	6	6	3	193
7	(United Kingdom) Michelle Nixon	5	4	3	3	3	1	2	10	8	8	9	Ret	8	6	8	Ret	7				170
8	(United Kingdom) Craig Dawson										Ret	4	6	4	1	1	3	1	1	1	4	168
9	(United Kingdom) Sarah Parsons	7	7	5	DNS	5	7	5	4	6	7	8	Ret	7	Ret	DNS	9	12	9	8	9	142
10	(United Kingdom) Dawn Boyd	9	Ret	7	4	6	6	Ret	8	12	9	10	Ret	9	7	7	8	8	8	7	6	142
11	(United Kingdom) Nina-Jo Atkinson	11	10	11	8	10	9	8	11	10	Ret	11	7	10	Ret	Ret	10	11	11	11	11	102
12	(United Kingdom) Tim Crighton								5	1	2	2	2									84
13	(United Kingdom) Peter Slevin	8	9	6															10	10	10	43
14	(United Kingdom) Jason Richardson													Ret	8	9	Ret	10	Ret	9	8	36
15	(United Kingdom) Arthur Williams				9	8	8	7														32
16	(United Kingdom) Kristian White								6	5												21
17	(United Kingdom) Chris Mohan	10	8	10																		27
18	(United Kingdom) Rebecca Nuttall	12	11	Ret	10	11	Ret	DNS														20
