= 2015 British Touring Car Championship =

58th season of the British Touring Car Championship

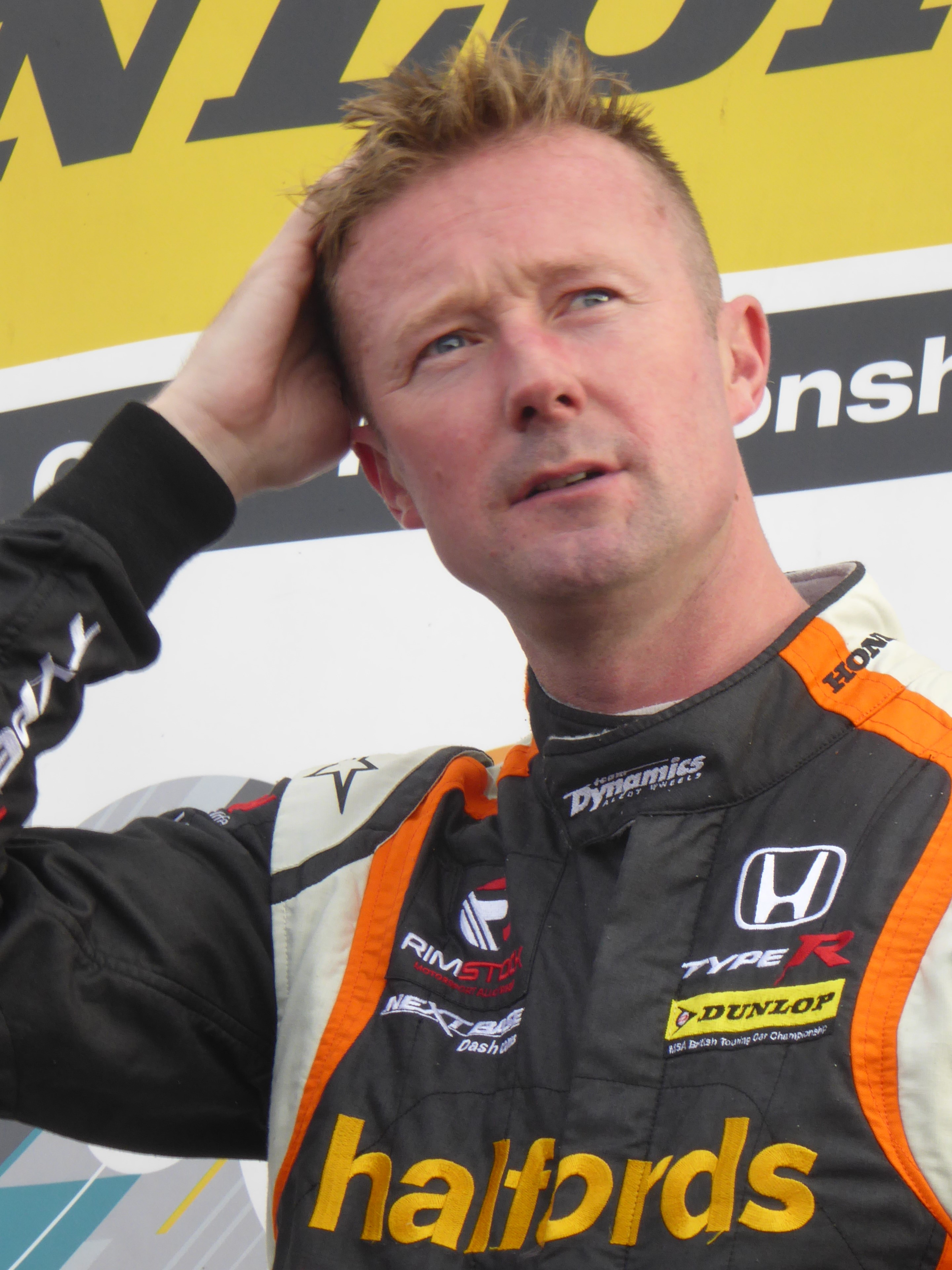
Gordon Shedden, the 2015 Drivers' Champion

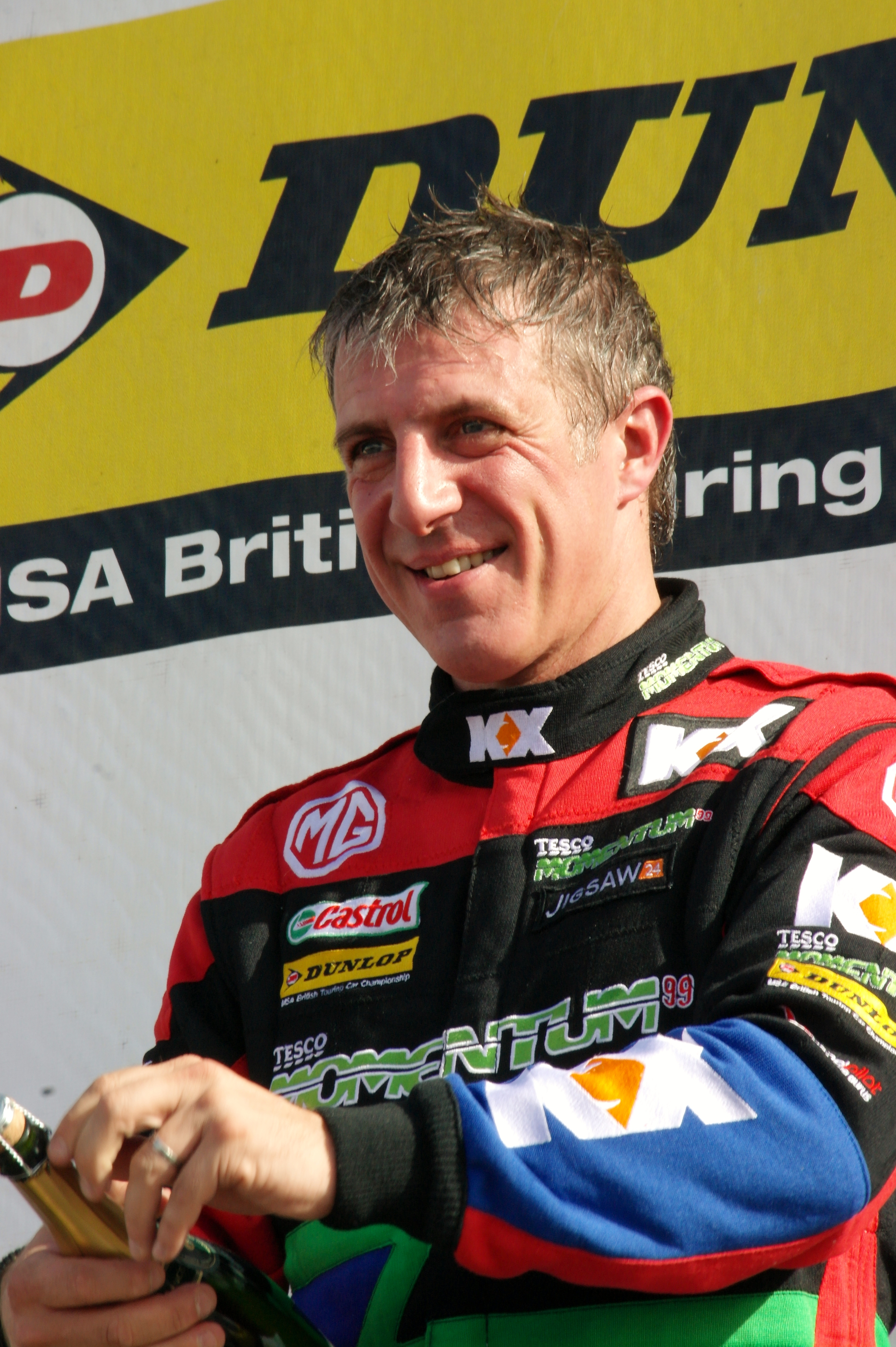
Jason Plato finished second in the Drivers' Championship.

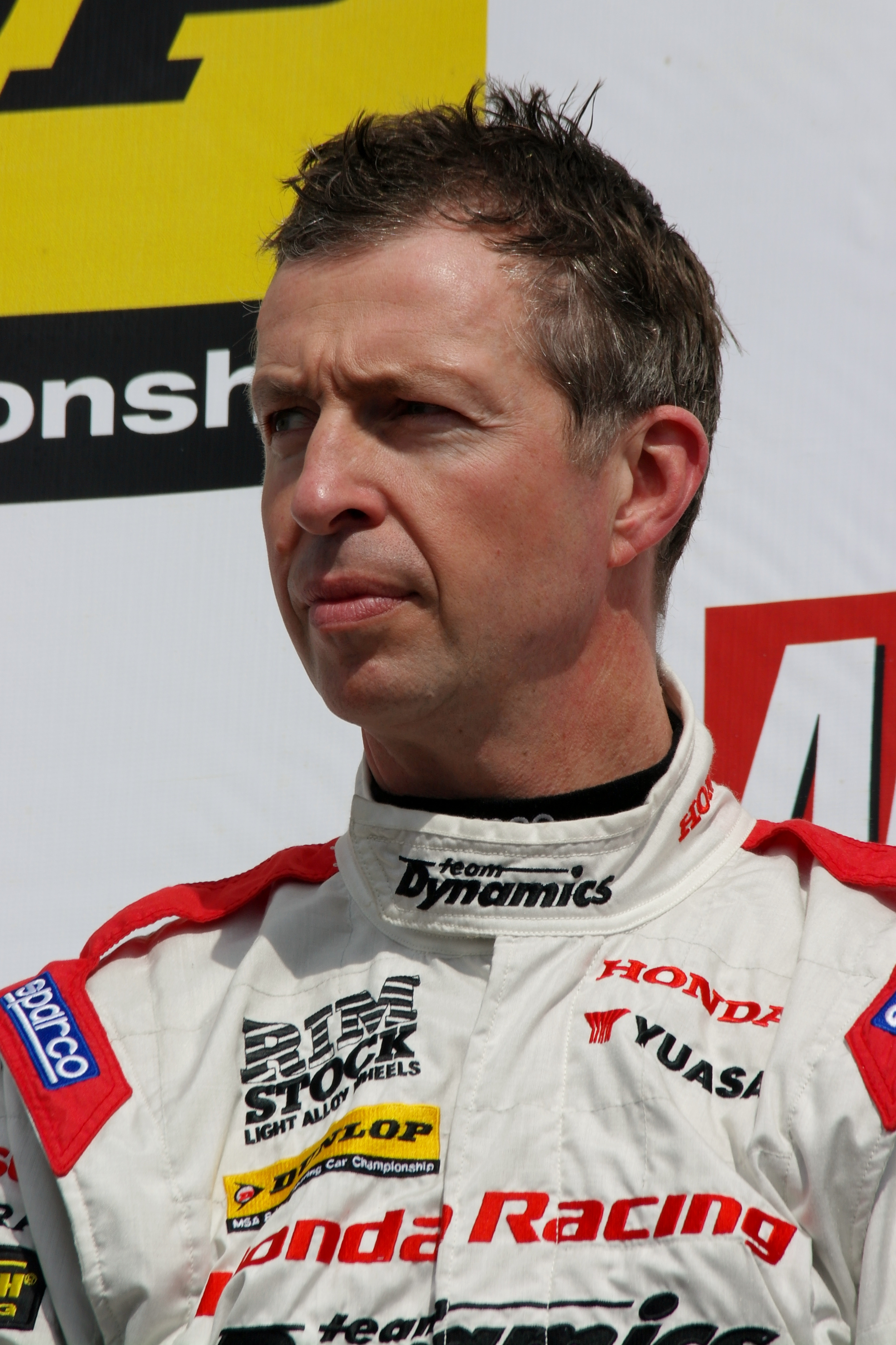
Matt Neal finished third in the Drivers' Championship.

The 2015 Dunlop MSA British Touring Car Championship (commonly abbreviated as BTCC) was a motor racing championship for production-based touring cars held across England and Scotland. The championship featured a mix of professional racing teams and privately funded amateur drivers competing in highly modified versions of family cars, which are sold to the public and meet the championship's technical regulations. The 2015 season was the 58th British Touring Car Championship season and the fifth season for cars conforming to the Next Generation Touring Car (NGTC) specification.

Colin Turkington was the defending drivers' champion. West Surrey Racing was the defending teams' champion, and MG the defending manufacturers' champions.

== Teams and drivers ==
Team	Car	Engine	No.	Drivers	Rounds
Constructor Entries
Team JCT600 with GardX	BMW 125i M Sport	BMW/Neil Brown	6	(United Kingdom) Rob Collard	All
Team JCT600 with GardX	BMW 125i M Sport	BMW/Neil Brown	7	(United Kingdom) Sam Tordoff	All
Team IHG Rewards Club	BMW 125i M Sport	BMW/Neil Brown	8	(United Kingdom) Nick Foster	8
Team IHG Rewards Club	BMW 125i M Sport	BMW/Neil Brown	111	(United Kingdom) Andy Priaulx	1–7, 9–10
Infiniti Support Our Paras Racing	Infiniti Q50	TOCA/Swindon	22	(United Kingdom) Derek Palmer Jr.	1–3
Infiniti Support Our Paras Racing	Infiniti Q50	TOCA/Swindon	84	(United Kingdom) Richard Hawken	2
Infiniti Support Our Paras Racing	Infiniti Q50	TOCA/Swindon	85	(United Kingdom) Martin Donnelly	3
Honda Yuasa Racing	Honda Civic Type R	Honda/Neil Brown	25	(United Kingdom) Matt Neal	All
Honda Yuasa Racing	Honda Civic Type R	Honda/Neil Brown	52	(United Kingdom) Gordon Shedden	All
MG Triple Eight Racing	MG6 GT	TOCA/Swindon	31	(United Kingdom) Jack Goff	All
MG Triple Eight Racing	MG6 GT	TOCA/Swindon	77	(United Kingdom) Andrew Jordan	All
Independent Entries
Team BMR; Team BMR RCIB Insurance (Note: From Rounds 1 to 7, known as Team BMR. From Rounds 8 to 10 onwards Team BMR was known as Team BMR RCIB Insurance)	Volkswagen CC	TOCA/Swindon	1	(United Kingdom) Colin Turkington	All
Team BMR; Team BMR RCIB Insurance	Volkswagen CC	TOCA/Swindon	9	(Switzerland) Alain Menu	10
Team BMR; Team BMR RCIB Insurance	Volkswagen CC	TOCA/Swindon	39	(United Kingdom) Warren Scott	1–9
Team BMR; Team BMR RCIB Insurance	Volkswagen CC	TOCA/Swindon	40	(Republic of Ireland) Árón Smith	All
Team BMR; Team BMR RCIB Insurance	Volkswagen CC	TOCA/Swindon	99	(United Kingdom) Jason Plato	All
Motorbase Performance	Ford Focus ST	Ford/Mountune	4	(United Kingdom) Mat Jackson	6–10
Motorbase Performance	Ford Focus ST	Ford/Mountune	44	(United Kingdom) James Cole	6–10
Handy Motorsport	Toyota Avensis	TOCA/Swindon	11	(United Kingdom) Simon Belcher	1–5, 9–10
Handy Motorsport	Toyota Avensis	TOCA/Swindon	67	(United States) Robb Holland	6–8
Speedworks Motorsport	Toyota Avensis	TOCA/Swindon	80	(United Kingdom) Tom Ingram	All
Welch Motorsport	Proton Persona	Proton/Welch	12	(United Kingdom) Andy Wilmot	1–5
Welch Motorsport	Proton Persona	Proton/Welch	13	(United Kingdom) Daniel Welch	2–5, 7–10
Dextra Racing	Ford Focus ST	Ford/Mountune	14	(United Kingdom) Alex Martin	1–2, 4–5, 7–10
Dextra Racing	Ford Focus ST	Ford/Mountune	114	(United Kingdom) Barry Horne	6
Laser Tools Racing	Mercedes-Benz A-Class	TOCA/Swindon	16	(United Kingdom) Aiden Moffat	All
WIX Racing	Mercedes-Benz A-Class	TOCA/Swindon	33	(United Kingdom) Adam Morgan	All
Power Maxed Racing	Chevrolet Cruze 4dr	TOCA/Swindon	17	(United Kingdom) Dave Newsham	All
Power Maxed Racing	Chevrolet Cruze 4dr	TOCA/Swindon	66	(United Kingdom) Josh Cook	All
AmD Tuning	Ford Focus ST	Ford/Mountune	21	(United Kingdom) Mike Bushell	All
AmD Tuning	Audi S3 Saloon	TOCA/Swindon	28	(United Kingdom) Nicolas Hamilton	5–6, 8–9
AmD Tuning	Audi S3 Saloon	TOCA/Swindon	29	(United Kingdom) Jake Hill	10
Support Our Paras Racing	Infiniti Q50	TOCA/Swindon	22	(United Kingdom) Derek Palmer Jr.	4–10
Support Our Paras Racing	Infiniti Q50	TOCA/Swindon	71	(United Kingdom) Max Coates	5
RCIB Insurance Racing	Toyota Avensis	Toyota/XCtechR	23	(United Kingdom) Kieran Gallagher	1–7
RCIB Insurance Racing	Toyota Avensis	TOCA/Swindon	23	(United Kingdom) Kieran Gallagher	8
RCIB Insurance Racing	Toyota Avensis	TOCA/Swindon	34	(United Kingdom) Tony Gilham	9–10
Eurotech Racing	Honda Civic	TOCA/Swindon	30	(United Kingdom) Martin Depper	All
Eurotech Racing	Honda Civic	TOCA/Swindon	55	(United Kingdom) Jeff Smith	All
Exocet AlcoSense Racing	Audi A4	TOCA/Swindon	54	(United Kingdom) Hunter Abbott	All
Exocet AlcoSense Racing	Audi A4	TOCA/Swindon	101	(United Kingdom) Rob Austin	All
Houseman Racing	Toyota Avensis	TOCA/Swindon	95	(United Kingdom) Stewart Lines	All

Key
Eligible for the Jack Sears Trophy for best rookie of the season
Guest driver ineligible for any championship points

=== Driver changes ===
Changed teams

- Sam Tordoff, moved from MG/Triple Eight to West Surrey Racing.
- Andrew Jordan, moved to the works MG/Triple Eight team from his family run Eurotech Racing.
- Colin Turkington and Jason Plato, both moved to Team BMR from West Surrey Racing and MG/Triple Eight respectively.
- Dave Newsham, moved from AmD Tuning to Power Maxed Racing.
- Jack Goff, moved from Team BMR to Triple Eight Racing.
- James Cole, moved from United Autosports to Motorbase Performance.

Entering/re-entering BTCC

- Mike Bushell, who raced in the Knockhill round in 2013, will compete in his first full season with AmD Tuning.
- Richard Hawken and Derek Palmer Jr., who competed in the HSCC Super Touring Car Championship for historic touring cars in 2014, will enter the championship with Support Our Paras Racing.
- Jeff Smith will return to the BTCC with Eurotech Racing, having last raced for them in 2013.
- Andy Wilmot will return with Welch Motorsport, having last raced at Rockingham in 2013 for Tony Gilham Racing.
- Triple WTCC champion Andy Priaulx will return with West Surrey Racing, having last raced in the series in 2002.
- Alex Martin, who competed in the Ferrari Challenge in 2014, will enter the championship with Team Parker Racing under the Dextra Racing banner.
- Kieran Gallagher will return with Team HARD, having last raced with the team at Knockhill in 2013.
- Josh Cook, who was runner-up in the 2014 Renault Clio Cup United Kingdom season, will make his BTCC debut with Power Maxed Racing under the #RacingforHeroes banner.
- Ex-motocross rider Stewart Lines will make his BTCC debut with Houseman Racing, having previously raced in the Mini Challenge, Volkswagen Cup and the SEAT Cupra Championship.
- Nicolas Hamilton, half-brother to Formula One world champion Lewis Hamilton and sometime ETCC competitor, will enter the championship with AmD Tuning. However his entry is considered as guest entry and therefore he won't be eligible for points.

Leaving BTCC

- Ollie Jackson and Nick Foster announced that they would not be returning to the BTCC in 2015. Foster made one-off appearance at Rockingham for Team IHG Rewards Club as replacement for Andy Priaulx, who was unable to participate due to duties in the European Le Mans Series.
- Lea Wood stepped down from his driving duties, to take a management role in his team, Houseman Racing.
- Chris Stockton stepped down from being team owner and driver of BTC Racing, selling the team to Automotive Brands.
- Marc Hynes left the championship to concentrate on the revived Manor F1 Team.
- Alain Menu, Fabrizio Giovanardi and Jack Clarke were unable to find a seat after losing their seats at Team BMR and Motorbase Performance respectively. Menu later returned, replacing the injured Warren Scott for the Brands Hatch season finale.
- Glynn Geddie and Luke Hines left the series after United Autosports left the championship.
- Robb Holland left the championship, having sold his car to AmD Tuning. He later returned to BTCC with Handy Motorsport filling in for Simon Belcher.

=== Team changes ===
- Infiniti entered the championship, offering factory support and the Infiniti Q50 as a base model. The cars are being run by Pro Motorsport under the banner of "Support Our Paras Racing". The team lost the Infiniti sponsorship and its manufacturer status following the 3rd round. The team was scaled down to a single entry from the Snetterton round onwards.
- Aiden Moffat Racing switched from a Chevrolet Cruze to a Mercedes-Benz A-Class, built by Ciceley Racing.
- After initially announcing a return in 2015, BTC Racing was sold to title sponsor Automotive Brands in February. The team switched to a saloon version of the Chevrolet Cruze for 2015, having bought Aiden Moffat's 2014 car.
- Team HARD re-entered the series having bought a single Toyota Avensis, previously owned by United Autosports.
- United Autosports left the series after only a single year of participation having sold their licences to Team HARD and Power Maxed Racing respectively.
- Motorbase Performance withdrew from the first half of the season, but rejoined the series from the Snetterton round onwards.
- Team Dynamics switched from the Honda Civic Tourer to the Honda Civic Type R.

== Rule changes ==
Organisers outlined a series of rule changes for the 2015 season in October 2014:

- The amount of success ballast is now implemented to the top ten drivers on the grid and the championship heading into a weekend instead of five. With more drivers now carrying ballast, the weight has been increased with the maximum being 30 kg (66 lb) heavier than in previous years. The maximum success ballast is 75 kg (165 lb) for the championship leader, down to 9 kg (20 lb) for tenth place. Rear-wheel drive (RWD) cars carry their success ballast as far forward in the cabin as possible, in order to better equalise the front to rear weight balance between both drivetrain formats.
- Cosworth and Xtrac independently analyse the start-line performances and in-gear acceleration of front and rear-wheel drive cars with a view to more equalising them through engine management programming.
- All engines have now been re-tested and re-validated by both TOCA and an independent specialist company – resulting in a boost level being set for each car and engine type for the season. As the larger amount of success ballast has a greater effect than before, the lap-time boost level adjustment can be dropped.
- Each car must still use the Dunlop soft tyre for one race at nine events – the Thruxton event does not apply as the soft tyre is not used at the venue – but each car must use them three times in race 1, three times in race 2 and three times in race 3 during the course of the season.
- The grid for race 2 at each event is set in the order of the fastest lap times achieved in race 1. If during race 1 a driver changes one or more tyres of the same type then any quicker lap time (if achieved) after that tyre change is discounted.
- The Jack Sears Trophy will be awarded to the top 'Rookie Driver' of the year.

== Race calendar ==
The provisional calendar was announced by the championship organisers on 18 August 2014. After using the "International" circuit configuration in 2014, the Oulton Park round will revert to the "Island" layout.

Round		Circuit	Date
1	R1	Brands Hatch (Indy Circuit, Kent)	5 April
1	R2	Brands Hatch (Indy Circuit, Kent)	5 April
1	R3	Brands Hatch (Indy Circuit, Kent)	5 April
2	R4	Donington Park (National Circuit, Leicestershire)	19 April
2	R5	Donington Park (National Circuit, Leicestershire)	19 April
2	R6	Donington Park (National Circuit, Leicestershire)	19 April
3	R7	Thruxton Circuit (Hampshire)	10 May
3	R8	Thruxton Circuit (Hampshire)	10 May
3	R9	Thruxton Circuit (Hampshire)	10 May
4	R10	Oulton Park (Island Circuit, Cheshire)	7 June
4	R11	Oulton Park (Island Circuit, Cheshire)	7 June
4	R12	Oulton Park (Island Circuit, Cheshire)	7 June
5	R13	Croft Circuit (North Yorkshire)	28 June
5	R14	Croft Circuit (North Yorkshire)	28 June
5	R15	Croft Circuit (North Yorkshire)	28 June
6	R16	Snetterton Motor Racing Circuit (300 Circuit, Norfolk)	9 August
6	R17	Snetterton Motor Racing Circuit (300 Circuit, Norfolk)	9 August
6	R18	Snetterton Motor Racing Circuit (300 Circuit, Norfolk)	9 August
7	R19	Knockhill Racing Circuit (Fife)	23 August
7	R20	Knockhill Racing Circuit (Fife)	23 August
7	R21	Knockhill Racing Circuit (Fife)	23 August
8	R22	Rockingham Motor Speedway (International Super Sports Car Circuit, Northamptonshire)	6 September
8	R23	Rockingham Motor Speedway (International Super Sports Car Circuit, Northamptonshire)	6 September
8	R24	Rockingham Motor Speedway (International Super Sports Car Circuit, Northamptonshire)	6 September
9	R25	Silverstone Circuit (National Circuit, Northamptonshire)	27 September
9	R26	Silverstone Circuit (National Circuit, Northamptonshire)	27 September
9	R27	Silverstone Circuit (National Circuit, Northamptonshire)	27 September
10	R28	Brands Hatch (Grand Prix Circuit, Kent)	11 October
10	R29	Brands Hatch (Grand Prix Circuit, Kent)	11 October
10	R30	Brands Hatch (Grand Prix Circuit, Kent)	11 October

== Results ==
Round		Circuit	Pole position	Fastest lap	Winning driver	Winning team	Winning independent	Winning JST
1	R1	Brands Hatch Indy	(United Kingdom) Andy Priaulx	(United Kingdom) Jason Plato	(United Kingdom) Rob Collard	Team JCT600 with GardX	(Republic of Ireland) Árón Smith	(United Kingdom) Josh Cook
1	R2	Brands Hatch Indy		(United Kingdom) Jason Plato	(United Kingdom) Gordon Shedden	Honda Yuasa Racing	(United Kingdom) Colin Turkington	(United Kingdom) Josh Cook
1	R3	Brands Hatch Indy		(United Kingdom) Gordon Shedden	(United Kingdom) Matt Neal	Honda Yuasa Racing	(Republic of Ireland) Árón Smith	(United Kingdom) Mike Bushell
2	R4	Donington Park	(United Kingdom) Colin Turkington	(United Kingdom) Gordon Shedden	(United Kingdom) Jason Plato	Team BMR	(United Kingdom) Jason Plato	(United Kingdom) Josh Cook
2	R5	Donington Park		(United Kingdom) Colin Turkington	(United Kingdom) Colin Turkington	Team BMR	(United Kingdom) Colin Turkington	(United Kingdom) Josh Cook
2	R6	Donington Park		(United Kingdom) Aiden Moffat (Note: Gordon Shedden originally set the fastest lap, but this was disallowed as it was set under yellow flag conditions.)	(United Kingdom) Matt Neal	Honda Yuasa Racing	(United Kingdom) Aiden Moffat	(United Kingdom) Josh Cook
3	R7	Thruxton Circuit	(Republic of Ireland) Árón Smith	(United Kingdom) Jason Plato	(United Kingdom) Gordon Shedden	Honda Yuasa Racing	(United Kingdom) Adam Morgan	(United Kingdom) Josh Cook
3	R8	Thruxton Circuit		(United Kingdom) Matt Neal	(United Kingdom) Jason Plato	Team BMR	(United Kingdom) Jason Plato	(United Kingdom) Kieran Gallagher
3	R9	Thruxton Circuit		(United Kingdom) Adam Morgan	(United Kingdom) Adam Morgan	WIX Racing	(United Kingdom) Adam Morgan	(United Kingdom) Josh Cook
4	R10	Oulton Park	(United Kingdom) Jason Plato	(United Kingdom) Jason Plato	(United Kingdom) Jason Plato	Team BMR	(United Kingdom) Jason Plato	(United Kingdom) Josh Cook
4	R11	Oulton Park		(United Kingdom) Sam Tordoff	(United Kingdom) Jason Plato	Team BMR	(United Kingdom) Jason Plato	(United Kingdom) Alex Martin
4	R12	Oulton Park		(United Kingdom) Andy Priaulx	(United Kingdom) Sam Tordoff	Team JCT600 with GardX	(United Kingdom) Jason Plato	(United Kingdom) Josh Cook
5	R13	Croft Circuit	(United Kingdom) Sam Tordoff	(United Kingdom) Sam Tordoff	(United Kingdom) Andy Priaulx	Team IHG Rewards Club	(United Kingdom) Colin Turkington	(United Kingdom) Josh Cook
5	R14	Croft Circuit		(United Kingdom) Gordon Shedden	(United Kingdom) Sam Tordoff	Team JCT600 with GardX	(United Kingdom) Jason Plato	(United Kingdom) Alex Martin
5	R15	Croft Circuit		(United Kingdom) Matt Neal	(United Kingdom) Rob Collard	Team JCT600 with GardX	(United Kingdom) Colin Turkington	(United Kingdom) Josh Cook
6	R16	Snetterton Motor Racing Circuit	(United Kingdom) Colin Turkington	(United Kingdom) Colin Turkington	(United Kingdom) Colin Turkington	Team BMR	(United Kingdom) Colin Turkington	(United Kingdom) Josh Cook
6	R17	Snetterton Motor Racing Circuit		(United Kingdom) Andy Priaulx	(United Kingdom) Colin Turkington	Team BMR	(United Kingdom) Colin Turkington	(United Kingdom) Mike Bushell
6	R18	Snetterton Motor Racing Circuit		(United Kingdom) Gordon Shedden	(United Kingdom) Jack Goff	MG Triple Eight Racing	(United Kingdom) Jason Plato	(United Kingdom) Josh Cook
7	R19	Knockhill Racing Circuit	(United Kingdom) Andy Priaulx	(United Kingdom) Mat Jackson	(United Kingdom) Rob Collard	Team JCT600 with GardX	(United Kingdom) Mat Jackson	(United Kingdom) Mike Bushell
7	R20	Knockhill Racing Circuit		(United Kingdom) Sam Tordoff	(United Kingdom) Gordon Shedden	Honda Yuasa Racing	(United Kingdom) Mat Jackson	(United Kingdom) Josh Cook
7	R21	Knockhill Racing Circuit		(United Kingdom) Sam Tordoff	(United Kingdom) Matt Neal	Honda Yuasa Racing	(United Kingdom) Adam Morgan	(United Kingdom) Josh Cook
8	R22	Rockingham Motor Speedway	(United Kingdom) Mat Jackson	(United Kingdom) Gordon Shedden	(United Kingdom) Mat Jackson	Motorbase Performance	(United Kingdom) Mat Jackson	(United Kingdom) Josh Cook
8	R23	Rockingham Motor Speedway		(United Kingdom) Gordon Shedden	(United Kingdom) Gordon Shedden	Honda Yuasa Racing	(United Kingdom) Mat Jackson	(United Kingdom) Josh Cook
8	R24	Rockingham Motor Speedway		(United Kingdom) Jason Plato	(United Kingdom) Jason Plato	Team BMR RCIB Insurance	(United Kingdom) Jason Plato	(United Kingdom) Josh Cook
9	R25	Silverstone Circuit	(United Kingdom) Mat Jackson	(United Kingdom) Mat Jackson	(United Kingdom) Mat Jackson	Motorbase Performance	(United Kingdom) Mat Jackson	(United Kingdom) Josh Cook
9	R26	Silverstone Circuit		(United Kingdom) Adam Morgan	(United Kingdom) Andy Priaulx	Team IHG Rewards Club	(Republic of Ireland) Árón Smith	(United Kingdom) Josh Cook
9	R27	Silverstone Circuit		(United Kingdom) Mat Jackson	(United Kingdom) Colin Turkington	Team BMR RCIB Insurance	(United Kingdom) Colin Turkington	(United Kingdom) Mike Bushell
10	R28	Brands Hatch GP	(United Kingdom) Mat Jackson	(United Kingdom) Mat Jackson	(United Kingdom) Mat Jackson	Motorbase Performance	(United Kingdom) Mat Jackson	(United Kingdom) Josh Cook
10	R29	Brands Hatch GP		(United Kingdom) Adam Morgan	(United Kingdom) Mat Jackson	Motorbase Performance	(United Kingdom) Mat Jackson	(United Kingdom) Josh Cook
10	R30	Brands Hatch GP		(United Kingdom) Sam Tordoff	(United Kingdom) Jason Plato	Team BMR RCIB Insurance	(United Kingdom) Jason Plato	(United Kingdom) Mike Bushell

== Championship standings ==
Points system
1st	2nd	3rd	4th	5th	6th	7th	8th	9th	10th	11th	12th	13th	14th	15th	R1 PP	Fastest lap	Lead a lap
20	17	15	13	11	10	9	8	7	6	5	4	3	2	1	1	1	1

Notes

- No driver may collect more than one point for leading a lap per race regardless of how many laps they lead.

=== Drivers' Championship ===
(key)

Pos	Driver	BHI			DON			THR			OUL			CRO			SNE			KNO			ROC			SIL			BHGP			Pts
1	(United Kingdom) Gordon Shedden	6	1*	NC	2	14	3	1*	3	5	6	2	4	4	5	3*	14	Ret	24	5	1*	8	2	1*	8	3	4	5	6	19	4	348
2	(United Kingdom) Jason Plato	3	Ret*	16	1*	5	8	4	1*	7	1*	1*	5	27	2	5	3	4	2	23	7	6	27	7	1*	25	7	4	5	6	1*	344
3	(United Kingdom) Matt Neal	8	8	1*	17	2	1*	2	Ret	6	2	4	3*	5	11	9	6	Ret	11	6	8	1*	8	5	4	8	5	6	7	7	5	317
4	(United Kingdom) Colin Turkington	5	3	12	3	1*	11	7	5	4	25	8	6	7	3	4	1*	1*	7	10	Ret	15	7	8	3	5	8	1*	4	Ret	12	310
5	(United Kingdom) Andrew Jordan	7	5	19	4	4	2	6	7	2	4	3	2	6	14	Ret	4	7	5	8	4	7	6	12	9	2	19	12	19	11	8	274
6	(United Kingdom) Sam Tordoff	15	7	4	5	9	Ret	11	6	3	9	5	1*	2*	1*	6	11	5	4	4	NC	Ret	10	14	5	10	6	3	11	13	11	270
7	(United Kingdom) Adam Morgan	11	4	7	9	3	12	3	8	1*	11	6	17*	9	9	23	7	2	13	9	10	2*	9	4	18	12	11	8	3	3	6	267
8	(United Kingdom) Andy Priaulx	9*	2	8	12	10	NC	5	NC	13	3	15	Ret	1*	4	2	5	3	3	3	5	4				23	1*	21	8	9	10	247
9	(United Kingdom) Jack Goff	4	9	2	7	8	Ret	8	4	11	7	9	8	10	10	8	9	6	1*	11	14	12	4	9	19	27	2	NC	20	5	3	233
10	(United Kingdom) Rob Collard	1*	16	Ret	8	6	4*	13	2*	14	13	Ret	14	3	6	1*	Ret	NC	10	1*	2	Ret	18	28	Ret	7	9	2*	10	10	7	226
11	(Republic of Ireland) Árón Smith	2	12	3	DNS	12	6	21	11	8	5	7	7	12	16	12	2	Ret	12	25	DNS	17	3	11	6	6	3	24	2	8	9	209
12	(United Kingdom) Mat Jackson																12	8	6	2*	3*	9	1*	2	14	1*	24*	7	1*	1*	2	200
13	(United Kingdom) Tom Ingram	10	6	6	16	13	10	10	Ret	10	8	11	9	8	8	7	10	Ret	9	Ret	13	16	5	10	2*	9	12	11	25	2	Ret	173
14	(United Kingdom) Rob Austin	14	10	5*	10	18	Ret	14	9	17	15	13	Ret	13	7	Ret	25	9	8	7	6	5	19	6	7	11	NC	17	18	Ret	Ret	120
15	(United Kingdom) Josh Cook	13	14	Ret	13	7	7*	9	18	9	12	26	13	11	Ret	15	15	17	16	16	15	13	13	3	10	14	14	16	9	16	15	95
16	(United Kingdom) Dave Newsham	17	15	9	6	11	Ret	Ret	12	12	10	Ret	18	15	13	11	8	Ret	14	18	12	11	12	Ret	Ret	4	Ret	DNS	26	4	Ret	95
17	(United Kingdom) Aiden Moffat	12	13	Ret	18	16	5	15	10	16	17	12	11	17	18	13	DNS	DNS	DNS	22	9	3	Ret	13	Ret	20	13	10	14	24	13	77
18	(United Kingdom) Martin Depper	16	Ret	13	15	19	9	12	13	15	14	14	Ret	14	Ret	17	17	Ret	15	14	11	10	14	18	11	13	15	14	15	Ret	19	53
19	(United Kingdom) James Cole																21	11	Ret	17	17	20	11	17	15	17	10	9	12	12	18	32
20	(United Kingdom) Jeff Smith	19	23	14	14	15	13	17	20	Ret	19	10	10	26	24	14	26	18	18	12	Ret	14	25	15	Ret	16	16	Ret	24	14	16	31
21	(United Kingdom) Hunter Abbott	18	11	10	19	17	14	16	14	21	18	23	16	16	12	16	18	12	17	DNS	DNS	DNS	23	23	Ret	24	26	Ret	16	21	17	23
22	(United Kingdom) Warren Scott	22	Ret	Ret	11	Ret	15	18	NC	Ret	16	16	12	18	15	10	13	Ret	19	13	19	Ret	Ret	20	Ret	DNS	DNS	DNS				23
23	(United Kingdom) Mike Bushell	21	17	11	Ret	NC	Ret	DNS	DNS	DNS	24	22	Ret	Ret	19	DNS	16	10	20	15	Ret	18	15	21	Ret	15	17	13	13	17	14	19
24	(United Kingdom) Nick Foster																						16	16	12							4
25	(United Kingdom) Barry Horne																20	13	Ret													3
26	(United States) Robb Holland																19	14	Ret	19	16	19	17	22	Ret							2
27	(United Kingdom) Simon Belcher	20	19	15	Ret	21	16	DNS	DNS	DNS	23	21	21	20	21	18										26	22	19	23	23	24	1
28	(United Kingdom) Daniel Welch				Ret	Ret	DNS	DNS	DNS	DNS	20	17	15	23	20	21				21	18	22	21	19	Ret	18	18	Ret	Ret	Ret	DNS	1
29	(United Kingdom) Kieran Gallagher	24	22	20	21	20	18	24	15	18	DNS	25	22	DNS	DNS	DNS	23	Ret	Ret	Ret	DNS	DNS	Ret	DNS	Ret							1
30	(United Kingdom) Tony Gilham																									Ret	20	15	22	20	20	1
31	(Switzerland) Alain Menu																												Ret	15	21	1
32	(United Kingdom) Alex Martin	23	18	Ret	20	23	19				21	18	NC	19	17	25				20	20	21	24	26	13	19	21	18	Ret	NC	22	0
33	(United Kingdom) Stewart Lines	25	21	17	24	22	17	19	16	Ret	Ret	19	20	24	26	24	24	Ret	21	24	Ret	23	22	27	16	22	27	20	Ret	22	Ret	0
34	(United Kingdom) Jake Hill																												17	18	Ret	0
35	(United Kingdom) Martin Donnelly							20	19	Ret																						0
36	(United Kingdom) Andy Wilmot	DNS	DNS	DNS	Ret	DNS	DNS	22	21	20	26	24	Ret	Ret	22	Ret																0
37	(United Kingdom) Max Coates													21	27	20																0
38	(United Kingdom) Richard Hawken				23	24	20																									0
39	(United Kingdom) Derek Palmer Jr.	Ret	20	18	22	DNS	DNS	23	17	19	22	20	19	22	23	19	22	15	23	Ret	21	Ret	26	25	Ret	21	23	23	21	Ret	23	-2
Guest drivers ineligible for points
-	(United Kingdom) Nicolas Hamilton													25	25	22	Ret	16	22				20	24	17	Ret	25	22				*
Pos	Driver	BHI			DON			THR			OUL			CRO			SNE			KNO			ROC			SIL			BHGP			Pts

=== Manufacturers'/Constructors' Championship ===
Pos	Manufacturer/Constructor	BHI			DON			THR			OUL			CRO			SNE			KNO			ROC			SIL			BHGP			Pts
1	Honda / Team Dynamics	6	1	1	2	2	1	1	3	5	2	2	3	4	5	3	6	Ret	11	5	1	1	2	1	4	3	4	5	6	7	4	869
1	Honda / Team Dynamics	8	8	NC	17	14	3	2	Ret	6	6	4	4	5	11	9	14	Ret	24	6	8	8	8	5	8	8	5	6	7	19	5	869
2	MG / Triple Eight Racing	4	5	2	4	4	2	6	4	2	4	3	2	6	10	8	4	6	1	8	4	7	4	9	9	2	2	12	19	5	3	796
2	MG / Triple Eight Racing	7	9	19	7	8	Ret	8	7	11	7	9	8	10	14	Ret	9	7	5	11	14	12	6	12	19	27	19	NC	20	11	8	796
3	BMW / West Surrey Racing	1	2	8	5	6	4	5	2	13	3	5	1	1	1	1	5	3	3	1	2	4	10	14	5	7	1	2	8	9	7	719
3	BMW / West Surrey Racing	9	16	Ret	8	9	NC	13	NC	14	9	15	14	2	4	2	11	5	4	3	5	Ret	16	16	12	10	9	3	10	10	10	719
4	Infiniti / Pro Motorsport	Ret	20	18	22	24	20	20	17	19																						106
4	Infiniti / Pro Motorsport				23	DNS	DNS	23	19	Ret																						106
Pos	Manufacturer/Constructor	BHI			DON			THR			OUL			CRO			SNE			KNO			ROC			SIL			BHGP			Pts

=== Teams' Championship ===
Pos	Team	BHI			DON			THR			OUL			CRO			SNE			KNO			ROC			SIL			BHGP			Pts
1	Team BMR RCIB Insurance	2	3	3	1	1	6	4	1	4	1	1	5	5	2	4	1	1	2	10	7	6	3	7	1	5	3	1	2	6	1	733
1	Team BMR RCIB Insurance	3	12	12	3	5	8	7	5	7	5	7	6	11	3	5	2	4	7	13	19	15	7	8	3	6	7	4	4	8	9	733
2	Honda Yuasa Racing	6	1	1	2	2	1	1	3	5	2	2	3	4	5	3	6	Ret	11	5	1	1	2	1	4	3	4	5	6	7	4	657
2	Honda Yuasa Racing	8	8	NC	17	14	3	2	Ret	6	6	4	4	5	11	9	14	Ret	24	6	8	8	8	5	8	8	5	6	7	19	5	657
3	MG Triple Eight Racing	4	5	2	4	4	2	6	4	2	4	3	2	6	10	8	4	6	1	8	4	7	4	9	9	2	2	12	19	5	3	518
3	MG Triple Eight Racing	7	9	19	7	8	Ret	8	7	11	7	9	8	10	14	Ret	9	7	5	11	14	12	6	12	19	27	19	NC	20	11	8	518
4	Team JCT600 with GardX	1	7	4	5	6	4	11	2	3	9	5	1	2	1	1	11	5	4	1	2	Ret	10	14	5	6	7	2	10	10	7	470
4	Team JCT600 with GardX	15	16	Ret	8	9	Ret	13	6	14	13	Ret	14	3	6	6	Ret	NC	10	4	NC	Ret	18	28	Ret	10	6	3	11	13	11	470
5	WIX Racing	11	4	7	9	3	12	3	8	1	11	6	17	9	9	23	7	2	13	9	10	2	9	4	18	12	11	8	3	3	6	267
6	Team IHG Rewards Club	9	2	8	12	10	NC	5	NC	13	3	15	Ret	1	4	2	5	3	3	3	5	4	16	16	12	23	1	21	8	9	10	246
7	Motorbase Performance																12	8	6	2	3	9	1	2	14	1	10	7	1	1	2	223
7	Motorbase Performance																21	11	Ret	17	17	20	11	17	15	17	24	9	12	12	18	223
8	Power Maxed Racing	13	14	9	6	7	7	9	12	9	10	26	13	12	13	11	8	17	14	16	12	11	12	3	12	4	14	16	9	4	15	209
8	Power Maxed Racing	17	15	Ret	13	11	Ret	Ret	18	12	12	Ret	18	15	Ret	15	15	Ret	16	18	15	13	13	Ret	Ret	14	Ret	DNS	26	16	Ret	209
9	Speedworks Motorsport	10	6	6	16	13	10	10	Ret	10	8	11	9	8	8	7	10	Ret	9	Ret	13	16	5	10	2	9	13	11	25	2	Ret	183
10	Exocet AlcoSense Racing	14	10	5	10	17	14	14	9	17	15	13	16	13	7	16	18	9	8	7	6	5	19	6	7	11	26	17	16	21	17	152
10	Exocet AlcoSense Racing	18	11	10	19	18	Ret	16	14	21	18	23	Ret	16	12	Ret	25	12	17	DNS	DNS	DNS	23	23	Ret	24	NC	Ret	18	Ret	Ret	152
11	Eurotech Racing	16	23	13	14	15	9	12	13	15	14	10	10	14	24	14	17	18	15	12	11	10	14	15	11	13	15	14	15	14	16	95
11	Eurotech Racing	19	Ret	14	15	19	13	17	20	Ret	19	14	DNS	26	Ret	17	26	Ret	18	14	Ret	14	25	18	Ret	16	16	Ret	24	Ret	19	95
12	Laser Tools Racing	12	13	Ret	18	16	5	15	10	16	17	12	11	17	18	13	DNS	DNS	DNS	22	9	3	Ret	13	Ret	20	14	10	14	24	13	87
13	AmD Tuning	21	17	11	Ret	NC	Ret	DNS	DNS	DNS	24	22	Ret	Ret	19	DNS	16	10	20	15	Ret	18	15	21	Ret	15	17	13	13	17	14	16
13	AmD Tuning																												17	18	Ret	16
14	Dextra Racing	23	18	Ret	20	23	19				21	18	NC	19	17	25	20	13	Ret	20	20	21	24	26	13	19	21	18	Ret	NC	22	8
15	Handy Motorsport	20	19	15	Ret	21	16	DNS	DNS	DNS	23	21	21	20	21	18	19	14	Ret	19	16	19	17	22	Ret	26	22	19	23	23	24	5
16	Houseman Racing	25	21	17	24	22	17	19	16	Ret	Ret	19	20	24	26	24	24	Ret	21	24	Ret	23	22	27	16	22	27	20	Ret	22	Ret	3
17	Support Our Paras Racing	Ret	20	18	22	24	20	20	17	19	22	20	19	22	23	19	22	15	23	Ret	21	Ret	26	25	Ret	21	23	23	21	Ret	23	1
17	Support Our Paras Racing				23	DNS	DNS	23	19	Ret				21	27	20																1
18	RCIB Insurance Racing	24	22	20	21	20	18	24	15	18	DNS	25	22	DNS	DNS	DNS	23	DNS	Ret	Ret	DNS	DNS	Ret	DNS	Ret	Ret	20	15	22	20	20	1
19	Welch Motorsport	DNS	DNS	DNS	Ret	Ret	DNS	22	21	20	20	17	15	23	20	21				21	18	22	21	19	Ret	18	18	Ret	Ret	Ret	DNS	0
19	Welch Motorsport				Ret	DNS	DNS	DNS	DNS	DNS	26	24	Ret	Ret	22	Ret																0
Pos	Team	BHI			DON			THR			OUL			CRO			SNE			KNO			ROC			SIL			BHGP			Pts

=== Independents' Trophy ===
Pos	Driver	BHI			DON			THR			OUL			CRO			SNE			KNO			ROC			SIL			BHGP			Pts
1	(United Kingdom) Colin Turkington	5	3	12	3	1	11	7	5	4	25	8	6	7	3	4	1	1	7	10	Ret	15	7	8	3	5	8	1	4	Ret	12	411
2	(United Kingdom) Jason Plato	3	Ret	16	1	5	8	4	1	7	1	1	5	27	2	5	3	4	2	23	7	8	27	7	1	25	7	4	5	6	1	403
3	(United Kingdom) Adam Morgan	11	4	7	9	3	12	3	8	1	11	6	17	9	9	23	7	2	13	9	10	2	9	4	18	12	11	8	3	3	6	386
4	(Republic of Ireland) Árón Smith	2	12	3	DNS	12	6	21	11	8	5	7	7	11	16	12	2	Ret	12	25	DNS	17	3	11	6	6	3	24	2	8	9	320
5	(United Kingdom) Tom Ingram	10	6	6	16	13	10	10	Ret	10	8	11	9	8	8	7	10	Ret	9	Ret	13	16	5	10	2	9	12	11	25	2	Ret	291
6	(United Kingdom) Rob Austin	14	10	5	10	18	Ret	14	9	17	15	13	Ret	13	7	Ret	25	9	8	7	6	5	19	6	7	11	Ret	17	18	Ret	Ret	242
7	(United Kingdom) Josh Cook	13	14	Ret	13	7	7	9	18	9	12	26	13	12	Ret	15	15	17	16	16	15	13	13	3	10	14	14	16	9	16	15	238
8	(United Kingdom) Mat Jackson																12	8	6	2	3	9	1	2	14	1	24	7	1	1	2	229
9	(United Kingdom) Aiden Moffat	12	13	Ret	18	16	5	15	10	16	17	12	11	17	18	13	DNS	DNS	DNS	22	9	3	Ret	13	Ret	20	13	10	14	24	13	197
10	(United Kingdom) Dave Newsham	17	15	9	6	11	Ret	Ret	12	12	10	DNS	18	15	13	11	8	Ret	14	18	12	11	12	Ret	Ret	4	Ret	DNS	26	4	Ret	194
11	(United Kingdom) Martin Depper	16	Ret	13	15	19	9	12	13	15	14	14	DNS	14	Ret	17	17	Ret	15	14	11	10	14	18	11	13	15	14	15	Ret	19	185
12	(United Kingdom) Jeff Smith	19	23	14	14	15	13	17	20	Ret	19	10	10	26	24	14	26	18	18	12	Ret	14	25	15	Ret	16	16	Ret	24	14	16	134
13	(United Kingdom) Hunter Abbott	18	11	10	19	17	14	16	14	21	18	23	16	16	12	16	18	12	17	DNS	DNS	DNS	23	23	Ret	24	25	Ret	16	21	17	125
14	(United Kingdom) Warren Scott	22	Ret	Ret	11	Ret	15	18	NC	Ret	16	16	12	18	15	10	13	Ret	19	13	19	Ret	Ret	20	Ret	DNS	DNS	DNS				95
15	(United Kingdom) Mike Bushell	21	17	11	Ret	NC	Ret	DNS	DNS	DNS	24	22	Ret	Ret	19	DNS	16	10	20	15	Ret	18	15	21	Ret	15	17	13	13	17	14	95
16	(United Kingdom) James Cole																21	11	Ret	17	17	20	11	17	15	17	10	9	12	12	18	94
17	(United Kingdom) Alex Martin	23	18	Ret	20	23	19				21	18	NC	19	17	25				17	20	21	24	26	13	19	21	18	Ret	NC	22	43
18	(United Kingdom) Daniel Welch				Ret	Ret	DNS	DNS	DNS	DNS	20	17	15	23	20	21				21	18	22	21	19	Ret	18	18	Ret	Ret	Ret	DNS	38
19	(United Kingdom) Stewart Lines	25	21	17	24	22	17	19	16	Ret	Ret	19	20	24	26	24	24	Ret	21	24	Ret	23	22	27	16	22	26	20	Ret	22	Ret	36
20	(United Kingdom) Simon Belcher	20	19	15	Ret	21	16	DNS	DNS	DNS	23	21	21	20	21	18										26	22	19	23	23	24	34
21	(United States) Robb Holland																19	14	Ret	19	16	19	17	22	Ret							26
22	(United Kingdom) Kieran Gallagher	24	22	20	21	20	18	24	15	18	DNS	25	22	DNS	DNS	DNS	23	Ret	Ret	Ret	DNS	DNS	Ret	DNS	Ret							23
23	(United Kingdom) Tony Gilham																									Ret	20	15	22	20	20	18
24	(United Kingdom) Derek Palmer Jr.										22	20	19	22	23	19	22	15	23	Ret	21	Ret	26	25	Ret	21	23	23	21	Ret	23	16
25	(United Kingdom) Barry Horne																20	13	Ret													9
26	(Switzerland) Alain Menu																												Ret	15	21	9
27	(United Kingdom) Andy Wilmot	DNS	DNS	DNS	Ret	DNS	DNS	22	21	20	26	24	Ret	Ret	22	Ret																9
28	(United Kingdom) Jake Hill																												17	18	Ret	8
29	(United Kingdom) Max Coates													21	27	20																4
Pos	Driver	BHI			DON			THR			OUL			CRO			SNE			KNO			ROC			SIL			BHGP			Pts

=== Independent Teams' Trophy ===
Pos	Team	BHI			DON			THR			OUL			CRO			SNE			KNO			ROC			SIL			BHGP			Pts
1	Team BMR RCIB Insurance	2	3	3	1	1	6	4	1	4	1	1	5	7	2	4	1	1	2	10	7	8	2	7	1	5	7	1	2	6	1	543
2	WIX Racing	11	4	7	9	3	12	3	8	1	11	6	17	9	9	23	7	2	13	9	10	2	9	4	18	12	11	8	3	3	6	427
3	Power Maxed Racing	13	14	9	6	7	7	9	12	9	10	26	13	12	13	11	8	17	14	16	12	11	12	3	12	4	14	16	9	4	15	357
4	Speedworks Motorsport	10	6	6	16	13	10	10	Ret	10	8	11	9	8	8	7	10	Ret	9	Ret	13	16	5	10	2	9	13	11	25	2	Ret	345
5	Exocet AlcoSense Racing	14	10	5	10	17	14	14	9	17	15	13	16	13	7	16	18	9	8	7	6	5	19	6	7	11	26	17	16	21	17	334
6	Eurotech Racing	16	23	13	14	15	9	12	13	15	14	10	10	14	24	14	17	18	15	12	11	10	14	15	11	13	15	14	15	14	16	284
7	Laser Tools Racing	12	13	Ret	18	16	5	15	10	16	17	12	11	17	18	13	DNS	DNS	DNS	22	9	3	Ret	13	Ret	20	14	10	14	24	13	259
8	Motorbase Performance																12	8	6	2	3	9	1	2	14	1	10	7	1	1	2	254
9	AmD Tuning	21	17	11	Ret	NC	Ret	DNS	DNS	DNS	24	22	Ret	Ret	19	DNS	16	10	20	15	Ret	18	15	21	Ret	15	17	13	13	17	14	150
10	Handy Motorsport	20	19	15	Ret	21	16	DNS	DNS	DNS	23	21	21	20	21	18	19	14	Ret	19	16	19	17	22	Ret	26	22	19	23	23	24	149
11	Dextra Racing	23	18	Ret	20	23	19				21	18	NC	19	17	25	20	13	Ret	20	20	21	24	26	13	19	21	18	Ret	NC	22	141
12	Houseman Racing	25	21	17	24	22	17	19	16	Ret	Ret	19	20	24	26	24	24	Ret	21	24	Ret	23	22	27	16	22	27	20	Ret	22	Ret	122
13	Support Our Paras Racing										22	20	19	22	23	19	22	15	23	Ret	21	Ret	26	25	Ret	21	23	23	21	Ret	23	89
14	Welch Motorsport	DNS	DNS	DNS	Ret	Ret	DNS	22	21	20	20	17	15	23	20	21				21	18	22	21	19	Ret	18	18	Ret	Ret	Ret	DNS	80
15	RCIB Insurance Racing	24	22	20	21	20	18	24	15	18	DNS	25	22	DNS	DNS	DNS	23	DNS	Ret	Ret	DNS	DNS	Ret	DNS	Ret	Ret	20	15	22	20	20	66
Pos	Team	BHI			DON			THR			OUL			CRO			SNE			KNO			ROC			SIL			BHGP			Pts

=== Jack Sears Trophy ===
Pos	Driver	BHI			DON			THR			OUL			CRO			SNE			KNO			ROC			SIL			BHGP			Pts
1	(United Kingdom) Josh Cook	13	14	Ret	13	7	7	9	18	9	12	26	13	12	Ret	15	15	17	16	16	15	13	13	3	10	14	14	16	9	16	15	526
2	(United Kingdom) Mike Bushell	21	17	11	Ret	NC	Ret	DNS	DNS	DNS	24	22	Ret	Ret	19	DNS	16	10	20	15	Ret	18	15	21	Ret	15	17	13	13	17	14	330
3	(United Kingdom) Stewart Lines	25	21	17	24	22	17	19	16	Ret	Ret	19	20	24	26	24	24	Ret	21	24	Ret	23	22	27	16	22	26	20	Ret	22	Ret	324
4	(United Kingdom) Derek Palmer Jr.	Ret	20	18	22	DNS	DNS	23	17	19	22	20	19	22	23	19	22	15	23	Ret	21	Ret	26	25	Ret	21	23	23	21	Ret	23	319
5	(United Kingdom) Alex Martin	23	18	Ret	20	23	19				21	18	NC	19	17	25				20	20	21	24	26	13	19	21	18	Ret	NC	22	308
6	(United Kingdom) Kieran Gallagher	24	22	20	21	20	18	24	15	18	DNS	25	22	DNS	DNS	DNS	23	DNS	Ret	Ret	DNS	DNS	Ret	DNS	Ret							164
7	(United Kingdom) Andy Wilmot	DNS	DNS	DNS	Ret	DNS	DNS	22	21	20	26	24	Ret	Ret	22	Ret																62
8	(United Kingdom) Max Coates													21	27	20																40
9	(United Kingdom) Richard Hawken				23	24	20																									33
10	(United Kingdom) Barry Horne																20	13	Ret													32
11	(United Kingdom) Martin Donnelly							20	19	Ret																						26
Pos	Driver	BHI			DON			THR			OUL			CRO			SNE			KNO			ROC			SIL			BHGP			Pts
