= Kieran Gallagher =

British racing driver (born 1990)

- Born: 10 March 1990 (age 36) Glasgow, Scotland

BTCC career
- Debut season: 2013
- Current team: RCIB Insurance Racing
- Car number: 23
- Starts: 19
- Wins: 0
- Poles: 0
- Fastest laps: 0
- Best finish: 28th in 2013

Previous series
- 2012–2014 2014: Volkswagen Racing Cup; Porsche Carrera Cup Great Britain

Kieran Gallagher (born 10 March 1990) is a British racing driver who last competed in the British Touring Car Championship with Team HARD. In 2013 Gallagher competed in the British Touring Car Championship for the first time at Knockhill, driving for Team HARD in a Vauxhall Insignia NGTC. After a season back in the wagen Racing Cup with Team HARD, he remained with the team for their return to the BTCC in 2015.

== Career ==
Gallagher gained his racing license in 2012 and entered the Scottish Legends Cars Championship in June that year. In 2013 he remained in the series but joined Burnett Motorsport. In August that year, Team HARD entered Gallagher in the Knockhill round of the British Touring Car Championship, driving one of the team's Vauxhall Insignia NGTC cars. He stated that his aim was to achieve a top-18 finish. He finished 22nd in race one, 20th in race two, and took 13th in the final race of the weekend. He remained with Team HARD for their 2014 Volkswagen Racing Cup campaign. He also drove for Parr Motorsport in the Porsche Carrera Cup Great Britain that year.

In 2015, when Team HARD returned to the BTCC with a Toyota Avensis, they selected Gallagher as their driver.

== Personal life ==
Gallagher has two older brothers, and works as a Hydrographic Surveyor.

== Racing record ==
=== Complete British Touring Car Championship results ===
(key) (Races in bold indicate pole position – 1 point awarded in first race) (Races in italics indicate fastest lap – 1 point awarded all races) (* signifies that driver lead race for at least one lap – 1 point awarded all races)

Year	Team	Car	1	2	3	4	5	6	7	8	9	10	11	12	13	14	15	16	17	18	19	20	21	22	23	24	25	26	27	28	29	30	Pos	Pts
2013	RCIB Insurance Racing	Vauxhall Insignia	BRH; 1	BRH; 2	BRH; 3	DON; 1	DON; 2	DON; 3	THR; 1	THR; 2	THR; 3	OUL; 1	OUL; 2	OUL; 3	CRO; 1	CRO; 2	CRO; 3	SNE; 1	SNE; 2	SNE; 3	KNO; 1; 22	KNO; 2; 20	KNO; 3; 13	ROC; 1	ROC; 2	ROC; 3	SIL; 1	SIL; 2	SIL; 3	BRH; 1	BRH; 2	BRH; 3	28th	3
2015	RCIB Insurance Racing	Toyota Avensis	BRH; 1; 24	BRH; 2; 22	BRH; 3; 20	DON; 1; 21	DON; 2; 20	DON; 3; 18	THR; 1; 24	THR; 2; 15	THR; 3; 18	OUL; 1 DNS	OUL; 2; 25	OUL; 3; 22	CRO; 1 DNS	CRO; 2 DNS	CRO; 3 DNS	SNE; 1; 23	SNE; 2 DNS	SNE; 3 Ret	KNO; 1 Ret	KNO; 2 DNS	KNO; 3 DNS	ROC; 1 Ret	ROC; 2 DNS	ROC; 3 Ret	SIL; 1	SIL; 2	SIL; 3	BRH; 1	BRH; 2	BRH; 3	30th	1
