= Derek Palmer Jr. =

British racing driver (born 1986)

Derek Palmer
- Nationality: (United Kingdom) British
- Born: 2 November 1986 (age 40) Lanark, Scotland

British Touring Car Championship career
- Debut season: 2015
- Current team: Support Our Paras Racing
- Car number: 22
- Starts: 28
- Wins: 0
- Poles: 0
- Fastest laps: 0
- Best finish: 31st in 2015

Previous series
- 2018 2014 2010 2008-2010 2008 2006-2008: TCR UK Touring Car Championship; HSCC Super Touring Car Trophy; British GT; GT4 European Series; British GT; Dutch Supercar Challenge

Derek Palmer Jr. (born 2 November 1986) is a British racing driver who most notably competed in the 2015 British Touring Car Championship with Support Our Paras Racing. He also competed in the 2018 TCR UK Touring Car Championship.

== Racing career ==
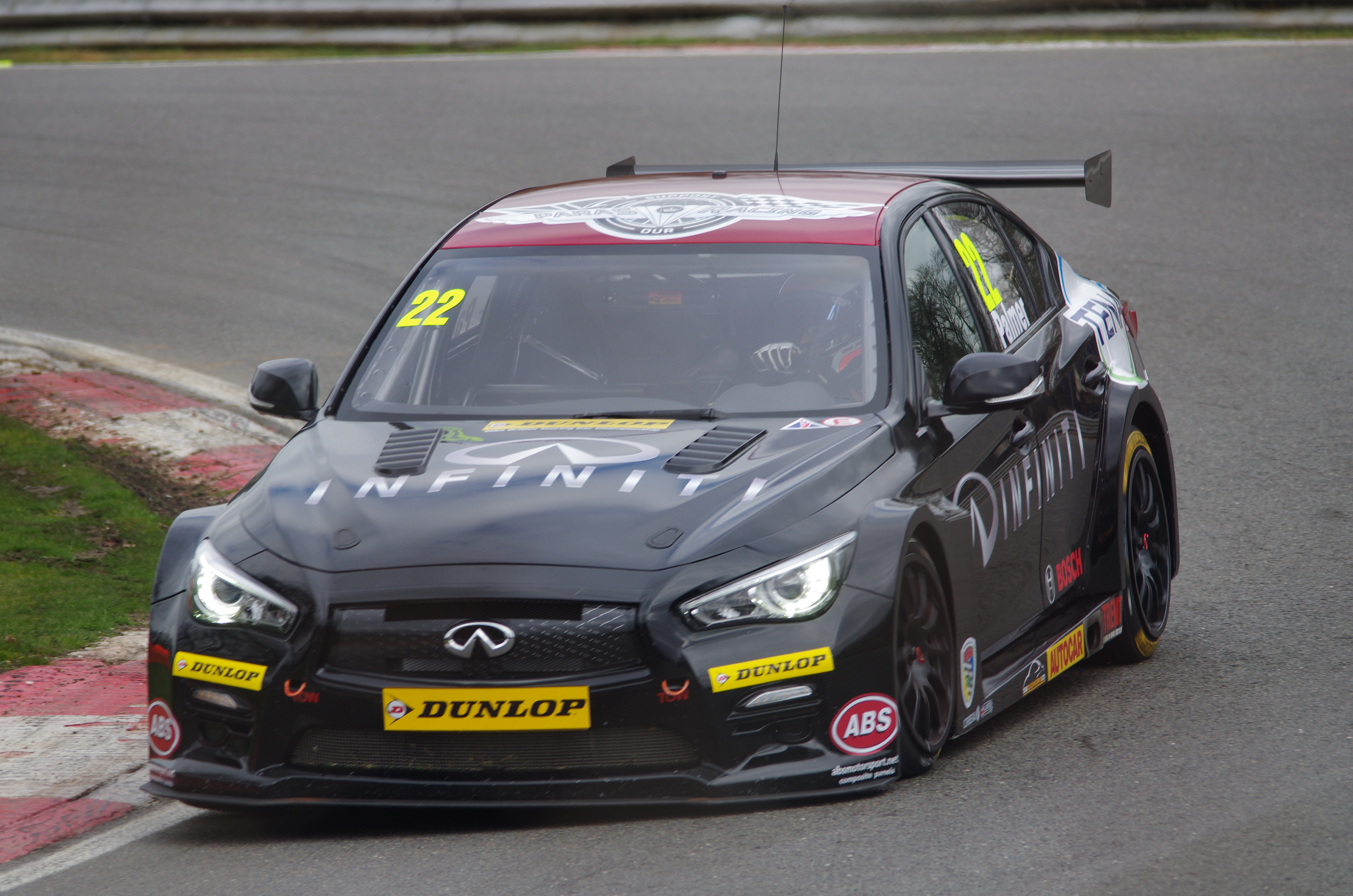
Palmer driving for Infiniti at Brands Hatch during the 2015 British Touring Car Championship season.

Palmer began his career in 2006 in the Dutch Supercar Challenge, he raced in the championship for three years from 2006 to 2008. In 2008, he switched to the GT4 European Series, he raced in the series up until 2010. In 2008, and 2010 he also raced in the British GT. In October 2014, it was announced that Palmer would make his British Touring Car Championship debut with Infiniti Support Our Paras Racing driving an Infiniti Q50. However, in May 2015, Infiniti withdrew their support and the team continued under the Support Our Paras Racing banner.

== Racing record ==
=== Complete British Touring Car Championship results ===
(key) (Races in bold indicate pole position – 1 point awarded just in first race; races in italics indicate fastest lap – 1 point awarded all races; * signifies that driver led race for at least one lap – 1 point given all races)

Year	Team	Car	1	2	3	4	5	6	7	8	9	10	11	12	13	14	15	16	17	18	19	20	21	22	23	24	25	26	27	28	29	30	DC	Pts
2015	Infiniti Support Our Paras Racing	Infiniti Q50	BRH; 1 Ret	BRH; 2; 20	BRH; 3; 18	DON; 1; 22	DON; 2 DNS	DON; 3 DNS	THR; 1; 23	THR; 2; 17	THR; 3; 19																						31st	1
2015	Support Our Paras Racing	Infiniti Q50										OUL; 1; 22	OUL; 2; 20	OUL; 3; 19	CRO; 1; 22	CRO; 2; 23	CRO; 3; 19	SNE; 1; 22	SNE; 2; 15	SNE; 3; 23	KNO; 1 Ret	KNO; 2; 21	KNO; 3 Ret	ROC; 1; 26	ROC; 2; 25	ROC; 3 Ret	SIL; 1; 21	SIL; 2; 23	SIL; 3; 23	BRH; 1; 21	BRH; 2 Ret	BRH; 3; 23	31st	1

=== Complete TCR UK Touring Car Championship results ===
(key) (Races in bold indicate pole position – 1 point awarded just in first race; races in italics indicate fastest lap – 1 point awarded all races; * signifies that driver led race for at least one lap – 1 point given all races)

Year	Team	Car	1	2	3	4	5	6	7	8	9	10	11	12	13	14	Pos	Pts
2018	Laser Tools Racing	Alfa Romeo Giulietta TCR	SIL; 1 Ret	SIL; 2; 12	KNO; 1; 6	KNO; 2; 7											11th	99
2018	DPE Motorsport	Alfa Romeo Giulietta TCR					BHI; 1 DNS	BHI; 1 DNS	CAS; 1 Ret	CAS; 2; 5	OUL; 1; 4	OUL; 2 Ret	CRO; 1	CRO; 2	DON; 1	DON; 2	11th	99
