= Alex Martin (racing driver) =

British racing driver (born 1987)

Alexander Martin
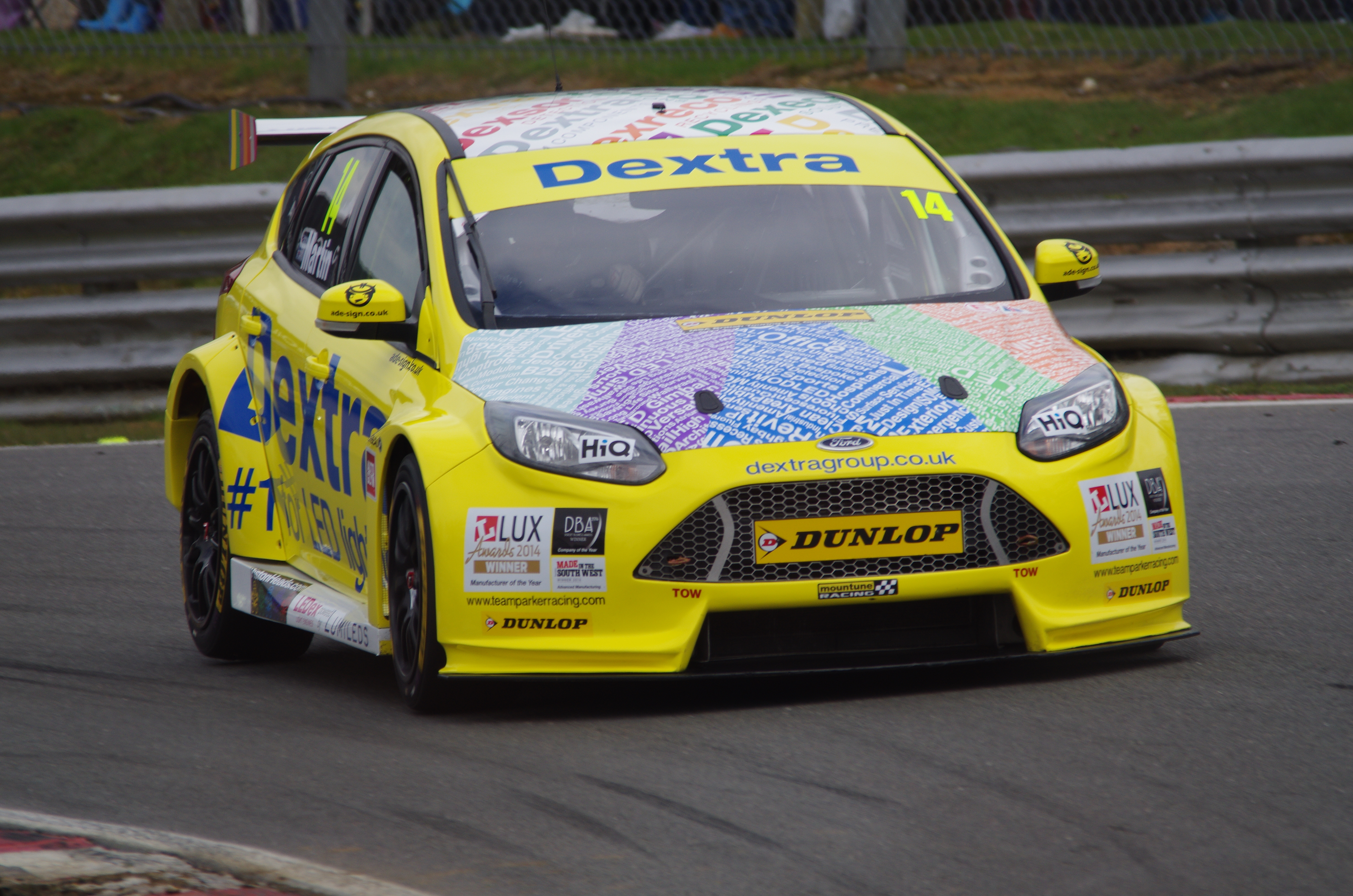
- Martin driving a Motorbase Performance Ford Focus at Brands Hatch in 2015
- Nationality: (United Kingdom) British
- Born: Alexander Martin; 21 April 1987 (age 39) Salisbury, Wiltshire, UK
- Relatives: Rupert Martin (father)

British GT Championship career
- Debut season: 2023
- Current team: Barwell Motorsport
- Categorisation: FIA Bronze
- Car number: 78
- Co-driver: (South Africa) Jarrod Waberski
- Former teams: Team Parker Racing
- Starts: 26
- Wins: 6
- Poles: 3
- Fastest laps: 0
- Best finish: 2nd in 2024

Previous series
- 2015–2016 2012–2014 2009–2011: British Touring Car Championship; Ferrari Challenge Europe; Porsche Carrera Cup Great Britain

Championship titles
- 2026: British GT - GT3 Silver-Am

Alexander Martin (born 21 April 1987) is a British racing driver who competes in the British GT Championship for Barwell Motorsport. He previously competed in the British Touring Car Championship for Motorbase Performance.

== Racing career ==
Martin began his career in the 2009 Porsche Carrera Cup Great Britain, he raced in the championship from 2009 to 2011 ending seventh in the Pro–Am 1 standings in 2011. He switched to the Ferrari Challenge Europe for the 2012 season, he finished fourth in the standings in 2014, with 122 points. In November 2014, it was announced that Martin would make his British Touring Car Championship debut with Motorbase Performance driving a Ford Focus ST, under the Dextra Racing banner. However, in March 2015, Motorbase Performance announced that they would miss the first half of the 2015 British Touring Car Championship season, with Team Parker Racing taking over the Dextra Racing entry.

== Racing record ==
=== Ferrari Challenge Results ===
Martin competed in the 2013 and 2014 seasons of Ferrari Challenge alongside his father Rupert Martin.

2013
| Championship | Car | (Italy) MNZ | | (Czech Republic) BRN | | (France) LMS | (Portugal) ALG | | (Germany) HOC | | (Italy) IMO | | (Italy) MUG | | | |
| Championship | Car | R1 | R2 | R1 | R2 | R | R1 | R2 | R1 | R2 | R1 | R2 | R1 | R2 | FM | |
Trofeo Pirelli Class
| Ferrari Challenge Europe | Ferrari 458 Challenge | 4 | 5 | 3 | 5 | 2 | 3 | 5 | 3 | 5 | Ret | 4 | 6 | 2 | 5 | |
2014
| Championship | Car | (Italy) MNZ | | (Italy) MUG | | (Czech Republic) BRN | | (Portugal) ALG | | (United Kingdom) SIL | | (Turkey) IST | | (United Arab Emirates) YAS | | |
| Championship | Car | R1 | R2 | R1 | R2 | R1 | R2 | R1 | R2 | R1 | R2 | R1 | R2 | R1 | R2 | FM |
Trofeo Pirelli Pro Class
| Ferrari Challenge Europe | Ferrari 458 Challenge | 5 | Ret | 3 | 4 | 1 | 4 | 2 | 3 | 4 | 1 | 4 | 4 | 4 | 4 | 3 |

=== Complete British Touring Car Championship results ===
(key) (Races in bold indicate pole position – 1 point awarded just in first race; races in italics indicate fastest lap – 1 point awarded all races; * signifies that driver led race for at least one lap – 1 point given all races)

| Year | Team | Car | 1 | 2 | 3 | 4 | 5 | 6 | 7 | 8 | 9 | 10 | 11 | 12 | 13 | 14 | 15 | 16 | 17 | 18 | 19 | 20 | 21 | 22 | 23 | 24 | 25 | 26 | 27 | 28 | 29 | 30 | DC | Pts |
|---|---|---|---|---|---|---|---|---|---|---|---|---|---|---|---|---|---|---|---|---|---|---|---|---|---|---|---|---|---|---|---|---|---|---|
| 2015 | Dextra Racing | Ford Focus ST | BRH; 1; 23 | BRH; 2; 18 | BRH; 3 Ret | DON; 1; 20 | DON; 2; 23 | DON; 3; 19 | THR; 1 | THR; 2 | THR; 3 | OUL; 1; 21 | OUL; 2; 18 | OUL; 3 NC | CRO; 1; 19 | CRO; 2; 17 | CRO; 3; 25 | SNE; 1 | SNE; 2 | SNE; 3 | KNO; 1; 20 | KNO; 2; 20 | KNO; 3; 21 | ROC; 1; 24 | ROC; 2; 26 | ROC; 3; 13 | SIL; 1; 19 | SIL; 2; 21 | SIL; 3; 18 | BRH; 1 Ret | BRH; 2 NC | BRH; 3; 22 | 31st | 0 |
| 2016 | Dextra Racing with Team Parker | Ford Focus ST | BRH; 1 Ret | BRH; 2; 24 | BRH; 3; 27 | DON; 1; 20 | DON; 2; 16 | DON; 3; 22 | THR; 1; 16 | THR; 2; 19 | THR; 3; 15 | OUL; 1; 30 | OUL; 2; 19 | OUL; 3; 14 | CRO; 1; 21 | CRO; 2; 25 | CRO; 3; 25 | SNE; 1 Ret | SNE; 2; 20 | SNE; 3 Ret | KNO; 1; 27 | KNO; 2; 18 | KNO; 3; 21 | ROC; 1; 23 | ROC; 2; 19 | ROC; 3; 17 | SIL; 1 NC | SIL; 2; 20 | SIL; 3; 18 | BRH; 1; 21 | BRH; 2; 22 | BRH; 3; 19 | 28th | 3 |

=== Complete British GT Championship results ===
(key) (Races in bold indicate pole position) (Races in italics indicate fastest lap)

| Year | Team | Car | Class | 1 | 2 | 3 | 4 | 5 | 6 | 7 | 8 | 9 | DC | Points |
|---|---|---|---|---|---|---|---|---|---|---|---|---|---|---|
| 2023 | Team Parker Racing | Porsche 911 GT3 R (991) | GT3 | OUL; 1 | OUL; 2 | SIL; 1; 15 | DON; 1 | SNE; 1 | SNE; 2 | ALG; 1 | BRH; 1 | DON; 1 | NC† | 0† |
| 2024 | Barwell Motorsport | Lamborghini Huracán GT3 Evo 2 | GT3 | OUL; 1; 3 | **OUL**; **2**; 1 | SIL; 1 Ret | **DON**; **1**; 1 | SPA; 1; 4 | SNE; 1; 1 | **SNE**; **2**; 10 | DON; 1; 4 | BRH; 1; 2 | 2nd | 177 |
| 2025 | Barwell Motorsport | Lamborghini Huracán GT3 Evo 2 | GT3 | DON; 1; 2 | SIL; 1; 7 | OUL; 1; 5 | OUL; 2; 12 | SPA; 1; 4 | SNE; 1; 3 | SNE; 2; 2 | BRH; 1; 10 | DON; 1; 1 | 4th | 138 |
| 2026 | Barwell Motorsport | Lamborghini Huracán GT3 Evo 2 | GT3 | SIL; 1; 5 | OUL; 1; 5 | OUL; 2; 5 | SPA; 1; 1 | SNE; 1; 5 | SNE; 2; 9 | DON; 1; 5 | BRH; 1; 4 | | 4th | 125 |

^{†} As Martin was a guest driver, he was ineligible for points. ^{*} Season still in progress.

Sporting positions
| Preceded by Andrew Howard; Tom Wood | British GT Championship; Silver-Am Champion; 2026; With: Jarrod Waberski | Succeeded by Incumbent |
