= Stewart Lines =

British racing driver, managing director and motorsport executive (born 1963)

- Lines driving a Ford Focus at Silverstone Circuit in 2016
- Nationality: (United Kingdom) British
- Born: Stewart Alan Lines; 7 June 1963 (age 63) Sutton Coldfield, Birmingham, UK

Dunlop Endurance Championship career
- Debut season: 2017
- Current team: Maximum Motorsport
- Car number: 95
- Starts: 14
- Wins: 0
- Poles: 0
- Fastest laps: 5
- Best finish: 5th in 2018

Previous series
- 2015–2017 2011–2014 2007 2007: British Touring Car Championship; Volkswagen Racing Cup GB; Renault Clio Cup GB Winter Series; SEAT Cupra Championship

Stewart Alan Lines (born 7 June 1963) is a British racing driver, managing director and motorsport executive who owns and directs MaximumGroup.Net, along with Maximum Motorsport. He is the owner of the TCR UK Touring Car Championship. Lines last competed competing in the 2019 Britcar Endurance Championship.

Lines has also raced in the British Touring Car Championship, having made his debut in 2015.

== Racing career ==
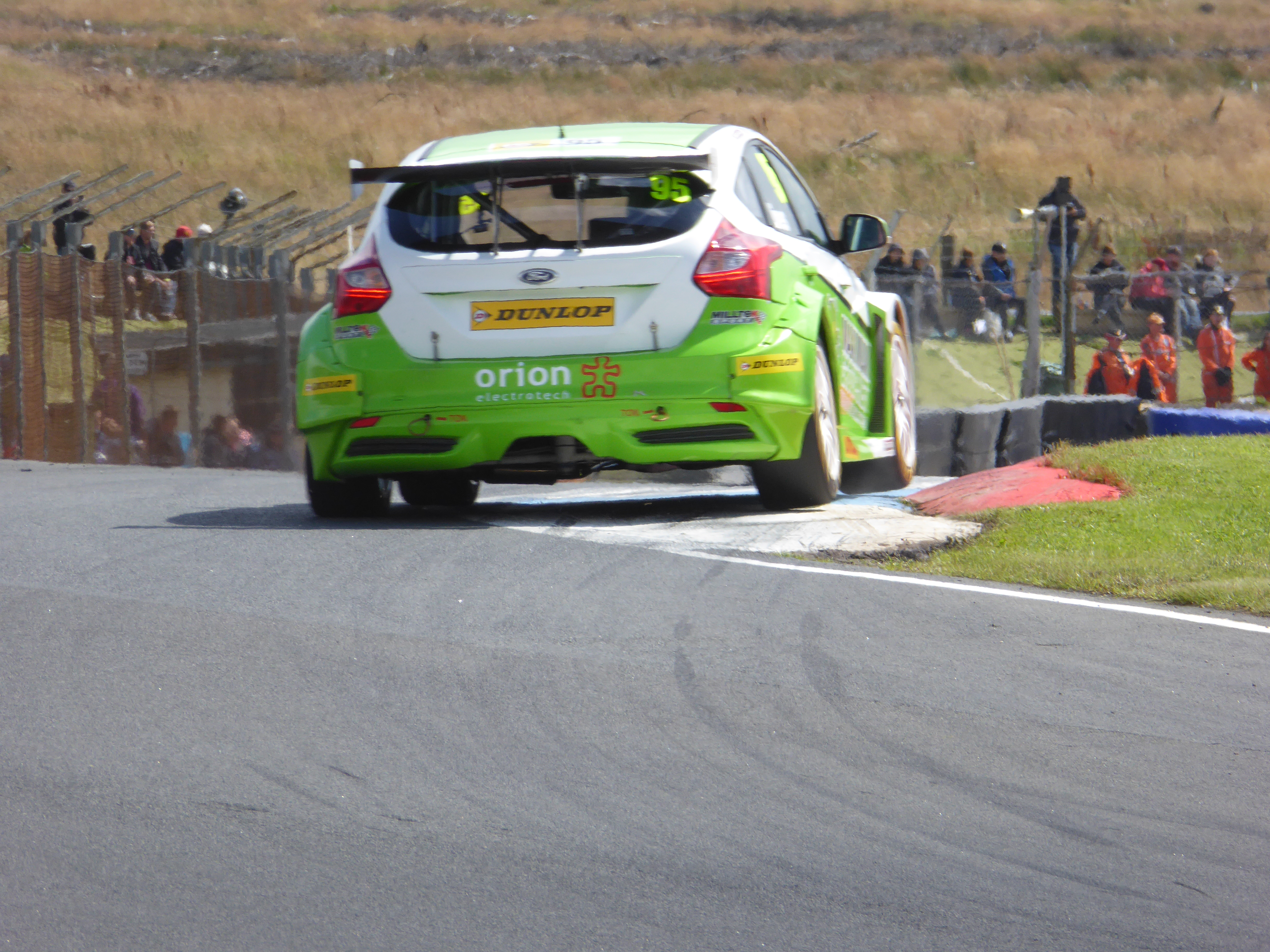
Lines driving the Maximum Motorsport Ford Focus ST at Knockhill during the 2017 British Touring Car Championship season.

Lines began his touring car career in the 2007 SEAT Cupra Championship season, he raced in the championship as guest driver for one round only. Later in 2007, he raced in the 2007 Renault Clio Cup GB Winter Series ending ninth in the standings. In 2011, he switched to the Volkswagen Racing Cup GB, he finished third in the standings in 2013, with 478 points. In March 2015, it was announced that Lines would make his British Touring Car Championship debut with Houseman Racing driving a Toyota Avensis.

Lines was part of the first ever front-wheel drive winning team of the 750 Motor Club Birkett Relay in 2018. Cupra Racing formed a team of Seat Cupra TCR cars piloted by Carl Swift, Shayne Deegan, Lee Deegan and Stewart Lines and won the event by just half a second, beating Sports Prototype teams.

In 2017, Lines entered into Britcar in a SEAT León TCR. He drove in two rounds of the season as an invitation entry. Tom Walker and Oliver Taylor drove the car as a points-eligible entry at Oulton Park in round six. In 2018, Lines entered the Dunlop Endurance Championship in a Maximum Motorsport-run SEAT Cupra TCR, in Class 4, with fellow BTCC-driver Adam Morgan and later Mat Jackson. For the 2019 season, Lines entered the Dunlop Endurance Championship with Ollie Taylor for Maximum Motorsport in a SEAT León TCR TCR, again running in Class 4.

Lines' team Maximum Motorsport organises and, with Maximum Networks, a tech-savvy communications company, heavily sponsors the VW Racing Cup and operates the Dunlop Touring Car Trophy alongside the TCR UK series, also being one of the main sponsors. His team also competes in the aforementioned championships and the Britcar Endurance Championship with TCR-spec cars, in which they were in contention for the 2019 title, winning the Class 4 title.

== Racing record ==
=== Complete British Touring Car Championship results ===
(key) (Races in bold indicate pole position – 1 point awarded just in first race; races in italics indicate fastest lap – 1 point awarded all races; * signifies that driver led race for at least one lap – 1 point given all races)

| Year | Team | Car | 1 | 2 | 3 | 4 | 5 | 6 | 7 | 8 | 9 | 10 | 11 | 12 | 13 | 14 | 15 | 16 | 17 | 18 | 19 | 20 | 21 | 22 | 23 | 24 | 25 | 26 | 27 | 28 | 29 | 30 | DC | Pts |
|---|---|---|---|---|---|---|---|---|---|---|---|---|---|---|---|---|---|---|---|---|---|---|---|---|---|---|---|---|---|---|---|---|---|---|
| 2015 | Houseman Racing | Toyota Avensis | BRH; 1; 25 | BRH; 2; 21 | BRH; 3; 17 | DON; 1; 24 | DON; 2; 22 | DON; 3; 17 | THR; 1; 19 | THR; 2; 16 | THR; 3 Ret | OUL; 1 Ret | OUL; 2; 19 | OUL; 3; 20 | CRO; 1; 24 | CRO; 2; 26 | CRO; 3; 24 | SNE; 1; 24 | SNE; 2 Ret | SNE; 3; 21 | KNO; 1; 24 | KNO; 2 Ret | KNO; 3; 23 | ROC; 1; 22 | ROC; 2; 27 | ROC; 3; 16 | SIL; 1; 22 | SIL; 2; 27 | SIL; 3; 20 | BRH; 1 Ret | BRH; 2; 22 | BRH; 3 Ret | 34th | 0 |
| 2016 | Maximum Motorsport | Ford Focus ST | BRH; 1; 22 | BRH; 2 Ret | BRH; 3; 28 | DON; 1 Ret | DON; 2; 25 | DON; 3; 21 | THR; 1; 19 | THR; 2; 24 | THR; 3; 20 | OUL; 1; 27 | OUL; 2; 21 | OUL; 3 Ret | CRO; 1; 23 | CRO; 2; 21 | CRO; 3; 19 | SNE; 1; 21 | SNE; 2; 18 | SNE; 3; 21 | KNO; 1; 25 | KNO; 2; 17 | KNO; 3; 22 | ROC; 1; 21 | ROC; 2; 18 | ROC; 3; 22 | SIL; 1; 19 | SIL; 2; 19 | SIL; 3; 22 | BRH; 1; 25 | BRH; 2; 25 | BRH; 3; 22 | 31st | 0 |
| 2017 | Team Parker Racing with Maximum Motorsport | Ford Focus ST | BRH; 1 | BRH; 2 | BRH; 3 | DON; 1 | DON; 2 | DON; 3 | THR; 1 | THR; 2 | THR; 3 | OUL; 1 | OUL; 2 | OUL; 3 | CRO; 1 | CRO; 2 | CRO; 3 | SNE; 1; 23 | SNE; 2 Ret | SNE; 3 Ret | KNO; 1 Ret | KNO; 2; 21 | KNO; 3; 28 | ROC; 1; 29 | ROC; 2; 25 | ROC; 3; 22 | SIL; 1 Ret | SIL; 2; 25 | SIL; 3 Ret | BRH; 1; 29 | BRH; 2; 25 | BRH; 3; 21 | 37th | 0 |

=== Complete Britcar results ===
(key) (Races in bold indicate pole position in class – 1 point awarded just in first race; races in italics indicate fastest lap in class – 1 point awarded all races;-

| Year | Team | Car | Class | 1 | 2 | 3 | 4 | 5 | 6 | 7 | 8 | 9 | 10 | 11 | 12 | 13 | 14 | 15 | 16 | DC | CP | Points |
|---|---|---|---|---|---|---|---|---|---|---|---|---|---|---|---|---|---|---|---|---|---|---|
| 2017 | Maximum Group | CUPRA León TCR | E4I / S4I | SIL; 1 | SIL; 2 | SNE; 1 | SNE; 2 | SIL; 1; 13 | SIL; 2; 3 | BRH; 1 | BRH; 2 | DON; 1 | DON; 2 | OUL; 1 | OUL; 2 | SIL | BRH; 1; 10 | BRH; 2; 9 | | NC | NC | 0† |
| 2018 | Maximum Motorsport | CUPRA León TCR | E4 | ROC; 1; 14 | ROC; 2; 5 | SIL; 1; 13 | SIL; 2; 3 | **OUL**; **1** Ret | OUL; 2 DSQ | DON; 1 | DON; 2 | SNE; 1 | SNE; 2 | SIL; 1 | SIL; 2 | BRH; 1; 7 | BRH; 2; 10 | | | 5th | 2nd | 180 |
| 2019 | Maximum Motorsport | CUPRA León TCR | 4 | **SIL**; **1**; 12 | SIL; 2; 17 | SIL; 1 | SIL; 2 | BRH; 1 | BRH; 2 | DON; 1 | DON; 2 | OUL; 1 | OUL; 2 | SNE; 1 | SNE; 2 | OUL; 1 | OUL; 2 | BRH; 1 | BRH; 2 | 26th | 9th | 87 |
| 2021 | Maximum Motorsports | Ginetta G55 Supercup | 4 | SIL; 1; 28 | SIL; 2 Ret | SNE; 1 | SNE; 2 | OUL; 1 | OUL; 2 | SIL; 1 | BRH; 1 | BRH; 1 | DON; 1 | DON; 2 | BRH; 1 | BRH; 1 | | | | 28th | 15th | 12 |

† Ineligible for points as he was an invitation entry.

=== Complete TCR UK/Touring Car Trophy results ===
(key) (Races in bold indicate pole position – 1 point awarded just in first race; races in italics indicate fastest lap – 1 point awarded all races; * signifies that driver led race for at least one lap – 1 point given all races)

| Year | Team | Car | 1 | 2 | 3 | 4 | 5 | 6 | 7 | 8 | 9 | 10 | 11 | 12 | 13 | 14 | DC | TU | Pts | TCR Pts |
|---|---|---|---|---|---|---|---|---|---|---|---|---|---|---|---|---|---|---|---|---|
| 2018 | Maximum Motorsport | SEAT Cupra TCR | SIL; 1; 9 | SIL; 2; 8 | KNO; 1 | KNO; 2 | BHI; 1; 5 | BHI; 1; 4 | CAD; 1 Ret | CAD; 2 DSQ | OUL; 1; 7 | OUL; 2; 6 | CRO; 1; 7 | CRO; 2; 5 | DON; 1; 7 | DON; 2; 2 | 6th | | 208 | |
| 2019 | Maximum Motorsport | SEAT Cupra TCR | OUL; 1 | OUL; 2 | DON; 1 | DON; 2 | CRO; 1 | CRO; 2 | BHI; 1; 4 | BHI; 2; 5 | DON; 1 | DON; 2 | | | | | 7th | 9th | 112 | 34 |
| 2019 | Power Maxed Racing | Vauxhall Astra | OUL; 1 | OUL; 2 | DON; 1 | DON; 2 | CRO; 1 | CRO; 2 | BHI; 1 | BHI; 2 | DON; 1; 11 | DON; 2; 12 | | | | | 7th | | 112 | |

=== TCR Spa 500 results ===
| Year | Team | Co-Drivers | Car | Class | Laps | Pos. | Class Pos. |
|---|---|---|---|---|---|---|---|
| 2019 | (Belgium) AC Motorsport | (Belgium) Mathieu Detry (Belgium) Vincent Radermecker (France) Stéphane Perrin | Audi RS 3 LMS TCR | **PA** | 439 | 5th | **2nd** |
