= Pro Motorsport (British racing team) =

(United Kingdom) Pro Motorsport
- Founded: 2015
- Team principal(s): Derek Palmer
- Current series: BTCC
- Website: parasracing.com

Pro Motorsport (currently competing as Support Our Paras Racing) is a British motor racing team based at Kirkby Mallory, Leicestershire. The team entered the British Touring Car Championship as a manufacturer entry in 2015 in partnership with car manufacturer Infiniti, racing a pair of NGTC Infiniti Q50s. However, after the first three rounds of the championship, Infiniti withdrew its support, leaving the team to run as an Independent entry. The team currently operates in the BTCC under the Support Our Paras Racing banner due to several members of the team being wounded and ex servicemen.
