= List of 2007 motorsport champions =

2007 motorsport champions
Previous: 2006	Next: 2008

This list of 2007 motorsport champions is a list of national or international touring auto racing series with a Championship decided by the points or positions earned by a driver from multiple races.

== Air racing ==
Series	Pilot	refer
Red Bull Air Race World Series	(United States) Mike Mangold	2007 Red Bull Air Race World Series

== Dirt oval racing ==
Series	Champion	Refer
Lucas Oil Late Model Dirt Series	(United States) Earl Pearson Jr.	
World of Outlaws Late Model Series	(United States) Steve Francis	
World of Outlaws Sprint Car Series	(United States) Donny Schatz	
World of Outlaws Sprint Car Series	Teams: (United States) Donny Schatz Motorsports	

== Drag racing ==
Series	Champion	Refer
NHRA Powerade Drag Racing Series	Top Fuel: (United States) Tony Schumacher	2007 NHRA Powerade Drag Racing Series season
NHRA Powerade Drag Racing Series	Funny Car: (United States) Tony Pedregon	2007 NHRA Powerade Drag Racing Series season
NHRA Powerade Drag Racing Series	Pro Stock: (United States) Jeg Coughlin Jr.	2007 NHRA Powerade Drag Racing Series season
NHRA Powerade Drag Racing Series	Pro Stock Motorcycle: (United States) Matt Smith	2007 NHRA Powerade Drag Racing Series season

== Drifting ==
Series	Champion	Refer
D1 Grand Prix	(Japan) Masato Kawabata	2007 D1 Grand Prix series
D1 Grand Prix	D1SL: (Japan) Kazuya Matsukawa	2007 D1 Grand Prix series
D1NZ	(New Zealand) Carl Ruiterman	2007 D1NZ season
European Drift Championship	(United Kingdom) Brett Castle	2007 European Drift Championship
Formula D	(United States) Tanner Foust	2007 Formula D season
NZ Drift Series	(New Zealand) Carl Ruiterman	2007 NZ Drift Series

== Karting ==
Series	Driver	Season article
Karting World Championship	KF1: (Italy) Marco Ardigò	
CIK-FIA Karting European Championship	FA: (Italy) Marco Ardigò	
CIK-FIA Karting European Championship	KZ1: (Italy) Alessandro Manetti	
CIK-FIA Karting European Championship	KZ2: (United Kingdom) Will Stevens	
CIK-FIA Karting European Championship	KF3: (United Kingdom) Jack Harvey	
Rotax Max Challenge	DD2: (South Africa) Leeroy Poulter	
Rotax Max Challenge	DD2 Masters: (Netherlands) Dennis Kroes	
Rotax Max Challenge	MAX: (United Kingdom) Ben Cooper	
Rotax Max Challenge	MAX Masters: (Republic of Ireland) Martin Pierce	
Rotax Max Challenge	Junior: (Argentina) Facundo Chapur	
Rotax Max Challenge	Nations Cup: United Kingdom	

== Motorcycle ==
Series	Rider	Season article
MotoGP World Championship	(Australia) Casey Stoner	2007 Grand Prix motorcycle racing season
MotoGP World Championship	Teams: (Italy) Ducati Marlboro Team	2007 Grand Prix motorcycle racing season
MotoGP World Championship	Constructors: (Italy) Ducati	2007 Grand Prix motorcycle racing season
250cc World Championship	(Spain) Jorge Lorenzo	2007 Grand Prix motorcycle racing season
250cc World Championship	Teams: (Spain) Master MVA Aspar Team	2007 Grand Prix motorcycle racing season
250cc World Championship	Constructors: (Italy) Aprilia	2007 Grand Prix motorcycle racing season
125cc World Championship	(Hungary) Gábor Talmácsi	2007 Grand Prix motorcycle racing season
125cc World Championship	Teams: (Spain) Bancaja Aspar	2007 Grand Prix motorcycle racing season
125cc World Championship	Constructors: (Italy) Aprilia	2007 Grand Prix motorcycle racing season
Superbike World Championship	(United Kingdom) James Toseland	2007 Superbike World Championship
Superbike World Championship	Manufacturers: (Japan) Yamaha	2007 Superbike World Championship
Supersport World Championship	(Turkey) Kenan Sofuoğlu	2007 Supersport World Championship
Supersport World Championship	Manufacturers: (Japan) Honda	2007 Supersport World Championship
Australian Superbike Championship	(Australia) Jamie Stauffer	

== Open wheel racing ==
Series	Driver	refer
FIA Formula One World Championship	(Finland) Kimi Räikkönen	2007 Formula One World Championship
FIA Formula One World Championship	Constructors: (Italy) Ferrari	2007 Formula One World Championship
GP2 Series	(Germany) Timo Glock	2007 GP2 Series
GP2 Series	Teams: (United Kingdom) iSport International	2007 GP2 Series
IndyCar Series	(United Kingdom) Dario Franchitti	2007 IndyCar Series
IndyCar Series	Rookie: (United States) Ryan Hunter-Reay	2007 IndyCar Series
Champ Car World Series	(France) Sébastien Bourdais	2007 Champ Car season
Champ Car World Series	Rookies: (Netherlands) Robert Doornbos	2007 Champ Car season
A1 Grand Prix	A1 Team Germany (Nico Hülkenberg/Christian Vietoris)	2006–07 A1 Grand Prix season
Indy Pro Series	(United Kingdom) Alex Lloyd	2007 Indy Pro Series
Indy Pro Series	Teams: (United States) Sam Schmidt Motorsports	2007 Indy Pro Series
Atlantic Championship	(Brazil) Raphael Matos	2007 Atlantic Championship
Formula Nippon	(Japan) Tsugio Matsuda	2007 Formula Nippon Championship
Formula Nippon	Teams: (Japan) Team Impul	2007 Formula Nippon Championship
International Formula Master	(Belgium) Jérôme d'Ambrosio	2007 International Formula Master
International Formula Master	Teams: (Italy) Cram Competition	2007 International Formula Master
International Formula Master	Master Junior: (Spain) Isaac López Navarro	2007 International Formula Master
Euroseries 3000	(Italy) Davide Rigon	2007 Euroseries 3000
Euroseries 3000	Teams: (Italy) Minardi by GP Racing	2007 Euroseries 3000
Italian Formula 3000	(Italy) Davide Rigon	2007 Euroseries 3000
EuroBOSS Series	(Netherlands) Klaas Zwart	
EuroBOSS Series	Teams: (United Kingdom) Team Ascari	
EuroBOSS Series	Masters: (Portugal) Carlos Tavares	
Formula Palmer Audi	(United Kingdom) Tim Bridgman	2007 Formula Palmer Audi season
Formula Palmer Audi	Autumn Trophy: (United Kingdom) Richard Keen	2007 Formula Palmer Audi season
Formula Challenge Japan	(Japan) Keisuke Kunimoto	2007 Formula Challenge Japan
Historic Formula One Championship	(United Kingdom) Steve Hartley	2007 Historic Formula One Championship
Formula Three
Formula 3 Euro Series	(France) Romain Grosjean	2007 Formula 3 Euro Series season
Formula 3 Euro Series	Teams: (France) ASM Formule 3	2007 Formula 3 Euro Series season
Formula 3 Euro Series	Rookie: (Italy) Edoardo Mortara	2007 Formula 3 Euro Series season
Formula 3 Euro Series	Nation: France	2007 Formula 3 Euro Series season
Asian Formula Three Pacific Series	(United Kingdom) Dillon Battistini	2007 Asian Formula Three Pacific Series
Asian Formula Three Pacific Series	Teams: (Republic of Ireland) Aran Racing	2007 Asian Formula Three Pacific Series
British Formula 3 Championship	(Estonia) Marko Asmer	2007 British Formula 3 season
British Formula 3 Championship	National: (Mexico) Sergio Pérez	2007 British Formula 3 season
Finnish Formula Three Championship	(Finland) Tomi Limmonen	2007 Finnish Formula Three Championship
Finnish Formula Three Championship	Teams: (Finland) Koiranen Brothers Motorsport	2007 Finnish Formula Three Championship
German Formula Three Championship	(Netherlands) Carlo van Dam	2007 German Formula Three season
German Formula Three Championship	Trophy: (Germany) Michael Klein	2007 German Formula Three season
German Formula Three Championship	Rookie: (Netherlands) Carlo van Dam	2007 German Formula Three season
All-Japan Formula Three Championship	(Japan) Kazuya Oshima	2007 Japanese Formula 3 Championship
All-Japan Formula Three Championship	Teams: (Japan) TOM'S	2007 Japanese Formula 3 Championship
Italian Formula Three Championship	(Italy) Paolo Maria Nocera	2007 Italian Formula Three season
Italian Formula Three Championship	Trofeo: (Italy) Matteo Cozzari	2007 Italian Formula Three season
Spanish Formula Three Championship	(Spain) Máximo Cortés	2007 Spanish Formula Three season
Spanish Formula Three Championship	Teams: (Spain) Escuderia TEC-Auto	2007 Spanish Formula Three season
Spanish Formula Three Championship	F300 Cup: (Norway) Christian Ebbesvik	2007 Spanish Formula Three season
Formula Three Sudamericana	(Brazil) Clemente de Faria Jr.	
Formula Three Sudamericana	Teams: (Brazil) Cesario Formula	
Australian Drivers' Championship	(Australia) Tim Macrow	2007 Australian Drivers' Championship
Australian Drivers' Championship	National: (Australia) Chris Barry	2007 Australian Drivers' Championship
Australian Drivers' Championship	Trophy: (Australia) Rod Anderson	2007 Australian Drivers' Championship
Toyota Racing Series	(New Zealand) Daniel Gaunt	2007–08 Toyota Racing Series
Austria Formula 3 Cup	(Austria) Stefan Neuburger	
Chilean Formula Three Championship	(Chile) José Luis Riffo	
Formula Renault
Formula Renault 3.5 Series	(Portugal) Álvaro Parente	2007 Formula Renault 3.5 Series season
Formula Renault 3.5 Series	Teams: (France) Tech 1 Racing	2007 Formula Renault 3.5 Series season
Formula V6 Asia	(United Kingdom) James Winslow	2007 Formula V6 Asia season
Formula V6 Asia	Teams: (Malaysia) Team Meritus	2007 Formula V6 Asia season
Eurocup Formula Renault 2.0	(New Zealand) Brendon Hartley	2007 Eurocup Formula Renault 2.0 season
Formula Renault Northern European Cup	(Germany) Frank Kechele	2007 Formula Renault Northern European Cup season
Championnat de France Formula Renault 2.0	(France) Jules Bianchi	2008 Championnat de France Formula Renault 2.0 season
Formula Renault 1.6 Argentina	(Argentina) Mariano Werner	2007 Formula Renault 1.6 Argentina
Formula Renault UK Championship	C: (United Kingdom) Duncan Tappy	2007 Formula Renault UK season
Formula Renault UK Championship	G: (United Kingdom) Adam Christodoulou	2007 Formula Renault UK season
Formula Renault UK Championship	Winter Cup: (United Kingdom) Richard Singleton	2007 Formula Renault UK Winter Cup
Formula Renault BARC Championship	(United Kingdom) Hywel Lloyd	2007 Formula Renault BARC FR2000 season
Formula Renault BARC Championship	Club: (United Kingdom) Ian Pearson	2007 Formula Renault BARC Club Class season
Formula Renault BARC Championship	Winter Series: (United Kingdom) Hywel Lloyd	
Italian Formula Renault Championship	(Finland) Mika Mäki	2007 Italian Formula Renault Championship season
Italian Formula Renault Championship	Teams: (Italy) Cram Competition	2007 Italian Formula Renault Championship season
Italian Formula Renault Championship	Winter Series: (Brazil) César Ramos	2007 Italian Formula Renault Winter Series
LO Formule Renault 2.0 Suisse	(Czech Republic) Adam Kout	2007 LO Formule Renault 2.0 Suisse season
Formule Campus Renault Elf	(France) Jean-Éric Vergne	2007 Formule Campus Renault Elf
Formula BMW
Formula BMW ADAC	(Germany) Jens Klingmann	2007 Formula BMW ADAC season
Formula BMW ADAC	Teams: (Germany) Eifelland Racing	2007 Formula BMW ADAC season
Formula BMW ADAC	Rookies: (France) Adrien Tambay	2007 Formula BMW ADAC season
Formula BMW Asia	(Malaysia) Jazeman Jaafar	
Formula BMW Asia	Teams: (Malaysia) CIMB Qi-Meritus	
Formula BMW UK	(Sweden) Marcus Ericsson	2007 Formula BMW UK season
Formula BMW UK	Teams: (United Kingdom) Fortec Motorsport	2007 Formula BMW UK season
Formula BMW USA	(Canada) Daniel Morad	
Formula BMW USA	Teams: (United States) EuroInternational	
Formula Ford
Australian Formula Ford Championship	(Australia) Tim Blanchard	2007 Australian Formula Ford Championship
Benelux Formula Ford Championship	(Netherlands) Franceso Pastorelli	2007 Benelux Formula Ford Championship
British Formula Ford Championship	(United Kingdom) Callum MacLeod	
Dutch Formula Ford Championship	(Netherlands) Franceso Pastorelli	2007 Dutch Formula Ford Championship
F2000 Championship Series	(United States) Cole Morgan	
New Zealand Formula Ford Championship	(New Zealand) Sam MacNeill	2006–07 New Zealand Formula Ford Championship
Pacific F2000 Championship	(United States) Patrick Barrett	2007 Pacific F2000 Championship
Other Junior formulae
Skip Barber National Championship	(United States) Joel Miller	
Star Mazda Championship	(United States) Dane Cameron	2007 Star Mazda Championship
Formula Azzurra	Trofeo Alboreto: (Italy) Salvatore Cicatelli	
Formula Lista Junior	(Austria) Klaus Bachler	2007 Formula Lista Junior season
Formula Lista Junior	Teams: (Austria) Neuhauser Racing	2007 Formula Lista Junior season
Formula Maruti (Summer)	(India) Naren Shankar	2007 Formula Maruti season
Formula Maruti (December)	(India) Goutham Parekh	2007 Formula Maruti season
Formula RUS	(Russia) Maxim Travin	2007 Formula RUS season
Formula Toyota	(Italy) Kei Cozzolino	2007 Formula Toyota season
JAF Japan Formula 4	East: (Japan) Kei Idaka	2007 JAF Japan Formula 4
JAF Japan Formula 4	West: (Japan) Yoshinari Tomimoto	2007 JAF Japan Formula 4
Russian Formula 1600 Championship	(Russia) Ivan Samarin	2007 Russian Formula 1600 Championship
Russian Formula 1600 Championship	Teams: (Russia) ArtLine Engineering	2007 Russian Formula 1600 Championship

== Rallying ==
Series	Driver/Co-Driver	Season article
World Rally Championship	(France) Sébastien Loeb	2007 World Rally Championship
World Rally Championship	Co-Drivers: (Monaco) Daniel Elena	2007 World Rally Championship
World Rally Championship	Manufacturers: (United States) Ford	2007 World Rally Championship
African Rally Championship	(Zimbabwe) Conrad Rautenbach	2007 African Rally Championship
Asia-Pacific Rally Championship	(Australia) Cody Crocker	2007 Asia-Pacific Rally Championship
Asia-Pacific Rally Championship	Co-Drivers: (Australia) Benjamin Atkinson	2007 Asia-Pacific Rally Championship
Australian Rally Championship	(Australia) Simon Evans	2007 Australian Rally Championship
Australian Rally Championship	Co-Drivers: (Australia) Sue Evans	2007 Australian Rally Championship
British Rally Championship	(United Kingdom) Guy Wilks	2007 British Rally Championship
British Rally Championship	Co-Drivers: (United Kingdom) Phil Pugh	2007 British Rally Championship
Canadian Rally Championship	(Canada) Antoine L'Estage	2007 Canadian Rally Championship
Canadian Rally Championship	Co-Drivers: (Canada) Nathalie Richard	2007 Canadian Rally Championship
Central European Zone Rally Championship	S2000: (Poland) Czopik Tomasz; S2000: (Italy) Scandola Umberto	2007 Central European Zone Rally Championship
Central European Zone Rally Championship	S1600: (Poland) Grzyb Grzegorz	2007 Central European Zone Rally Championship
Central European Zone Rally Championship	Group N: (Czech Republic) Václav Pech	2007 Central European Zone Rally Championship
Central European Zone Rally Championship	Group A: (Slovenia) Rihtar Miha	2007 Central European Zone Rally Championship
Central European Zone Rally Championship	Historic: (Austria) Gruber Sepp	2007 Central European Zone Rally Championship
Codasur South American Rally Championship	(Argentina) Roberto Sánchez	
Czech Rally Championship	(Czech Republic) Václav Pech	2007 Czech Rally Championship
Czech Rally Championship	Co-Drivers: (Czech Republic) Petr Uhel	2007 Czech Rally Championship
Deutsche Rallye Meisterschaft	(Germany) Hermann Gassner Sr.	
Estonian Rally Championship	(Estonia) Rainer Aus	2007 Estonian Rally Championship
Estonian Rally Championship	Co-Drivers: (Estonia) Kristo Kraag; Co-Drivers: (Estonia) Silver Kütt	2007 Estonian Rally Championship
European Rally Championship	(France) Simon Jean-Joseph	2007 European Rally Championship
European Rally Championship	Co-Drivers: (France) Jack Boyere	2007 European Rally Championship
French Rally Championship	(France) Patrick Henry	
Hungarian Rally Championship	(Hungary) Balázs Benik	
Hungarian Rally Championship	Co-Drivers: (Hungary) István Varga	
Indian National Rally Championship	(India) Gaurav Gill	
Indian National Rally Championship	Co-Drivers: (India) Musa Sherif	
Italian Rally Championship	(Italy) Giandomenico Basso	
Italian Rally Championship	Co-Drivers: (Italy) Mitia Dotta	
Italian Rally Championship	Manufacturers: (Italy) Fiat	
Middle East Rally Championship	(Qatar) Nasser Al-Attiyah	
New Zealand Rally Championship	(New Zealand) Sam Murray	2007 New Zealand Rally Championship
New Zealand Rally Championship	Co-Drivers: (New Zealand) Rob Ryan	2007 New Zealand Rally Championship
Polish Rally Championship	(France) Bryan Bouffier	
Rally America	(United States) Travis Pastrana	
Romanian Rally Championship	(Romania) Dan Gîrtofan	
Scottish Rally Championship	(United Kingdom) Gary Adam	
Scottish Rally Championship	Co-Drivers: (United Kingdom) Gordon Adam	
Slovak Rally Championship	(Czech Republic) Václav Pech	
Slovak Rally Championship	Co-Drivers: (Czech Republic) Petr Uhel	
South African National Rally Championship	(South Africa) Jannie Habig	
South African National Rally Championship	Co-Drivers: (South Africa) Douglas Judd	
South African National Rally Championship	Manufacturers: (Japan) Toyota	
Spanish Rally Championship	(Spain) Miguel Ángel Fuster	
Spanish Rally Championship	Co-Drivers: (Spain) José Vicente Medina	

=== Rallycross ===
Series	Driver	Season article
FIA European Rallycross Championship	Div 1: (Sweden) Lars Larsson	
FIA European Rallycross Championship	Div 1A: (Belgium) Michaël De Keersmaecker	
FIA European Rallycross Championship	Div 2: (Czech Republic) Tomáš Kotek	
British Rallycross Championship	(Republic of Ireland) Ollie O'Donovan	

== Sports car and GT ==
Series	Champion	Refer
Australian GT Championship	(Denmark) Allan Simonsen	2007 Australian GT Championship
British GT Championship	GT3: (United Kingdom) Bradley Ellis; GT2: (United Kingdom) Alex Mortimer	2007 British GT Championship
British GT Championship	GTC: (United Kingdom) Jamie Smyth; GTC: (United Kingdom) Graeme Mundy	2007 British GT Championship
Porsche Supercup, Porsche Carrera Cup, GT3 Cup Challenge and Porsche Sprint Challenge
Porsche Supercup	(United Kingdom) Richard Westbrook	2007 Porsche Supercup
Porsche Supercup	Teams: (Germany) HISAQ Competition	2007 Porsche Supercup
Porsche Carrera Cup Asia	(United Kingdom) Tim Sugden	2007 Porsche Carrera Cup Asia
Australian Carrera Cup Championship	(Australia) David Reynolds	2007 Australian Carrera Cup Championship
Porsche Carrera Cup Brasil	(Brazil) Ricardo Baptista	2007 Porsche Carrera Cup Brasil
Porsche Carrera Cup France	(France) Patrick Pilet	2007 Porsche Carrera Cup France
Porsche Carrera Cup France	Teams: (France) IMSA Performance	2007 Porsche Carrera Cup France
Porsche Carrera Cup Germany	(Germany) Uwe Alzen	2007 Porsche Carrera Cup Germany
Porsche Carrera Cup Germany	Teams: (Germany) Herberth Motorsport	2007 Porsche Carrera Cup Germany
Porsche Carrera Cup Great Britain	(United Kingdom) James Sutton	2007 Porsche Carrera Cup Great Britain
Porsche Carrera Cup Great Britain	Teams: (United Kingdom) Redline Racing	2007 Porsche Carrera Cup Great Britain
Porsche Carrera Cup Great Britain	Pro-Am: (United Kingdom) Nigel Rice	2007 Porsche Carrera Cup Great Britain
Porsche Carrera Cup Great Britain	Pro-Am Team: (United Kingdom) Redline Racing	2007 Porsche Carrera Cup Great Britain
Porsche Carrera Cup Japan	(Japan) Shinichi Takagi	2007 Porsche Carrera Cup Japan
Porsche Carrera Cup Scandinavia	(Sweden) Edward Sandström	2007 Porsche Carrera Cup Scandinavia
Porsche Carrera Cup Scandinavia	Teams: (Sweden) Kristoffersson Motorsport	2007 Porsche Carrera Cup Scandinavia

== Stock car racing ==
Series	Driver	Season article
NASCAR Nextel Cup Series	(United States) Jimmie Johnson	2007 NASCAR Nextel Cup Series
NASCAR Nextel Cup Series	Manufacturers: (United States) Chevrolet	2007 NASCAR Nextel Cup Series
NASCAR Busch Series	(United States) Carl Edwards	2007 NASCAR Busch Series
NASCAR Busch Series	Manufacturers: (United States) Chevrolet	2007 NASCAR Busch Series
NASCAR Craftsman Truck Series	(United States) Ron Hornaday Jr.	2007 NASCAR Craftsman Truck Series
NASCAR Craftsman Truck Series	Manufacturers: (Japan) Toyota	2007 NASCAR Craftsman Truck Series
NASCAR Canadian Tire Series	(Canada) Andrew Ranger	2007 NASCAR Canadian Tire Series
NASCAR Canadian Tire Series	Manufacturers: (United States) Ford	2007 NASCAR Canadian Tire Series
NASCAR Busch East Series	(United States) Joey Logano	2007 NASCAR Busch East Series
NASCAR Corona Series	(Mexico) Rafael Martínez	2007 NASCAR Corona Series
NASCAR West Series	(United States) Mike David	2007 NASCAR West Series
ARCA Re/Max Series	(United States) Frank Kimmel	2007 ARCA Re/Max Series
SCSA Racing Series	(United Kingdom) Colin White	2007 SCSA season
Turismo Carretera	(Argentina) Christian Ledesma	2007 Turismo Carretera

== Touring car ==
Series	Driver	Season article
World Touring Car Championship	(United Kingdom) Andy Priaulx	2007 World Touring Car Championship season
World Touring Car Championship	Manufacturers: (Germany) BMW	2007 World Touring Car Championship season
World Touring Car Championship	Independents: (Italy) Stefano D'Aste	2007 World Touring Car Championship season
ADAC Procar Series	(Germany) Franz Engstler	2007 ADAC Procar Series
ADAC Procar Series	Teams: (Germany) Engstler Motorsport	2007 ADAC Procar Series
Asian Touring Car Series	(Malaysia) Fariqe Hairuman	2007 Asian Touring Car Series
Asian Touring Car Series	Teams: (Malaysia) Petronas Syntium Team	2007 Asian Touring Car Series
Australian Saloon Car Championship	(Australia) Bruce Heinrich	2007 Australian Saloon Car Championship
British Touring Car Championship	(Italy) Fabrizio Giovanardi	2007 British Touring Car Championship
British Touring Car Championship	Teams: (United Kingdom) SEAT Sport UK	2007 British Touring Car Championship
British Touring Car Championship	Manufacturers: (United Kingdom) Vauxhall	2007 British Touring Car Championship
British Touring Car Championship	Independents: (United Kingdom) Colin Turkington	2007 British Touring Car Championship
British Touring Car Championship	Independents Teams: (United Kingdom) Team RAC	2007 British Touring Car Championship
BRL V6	(Netherlands) Donald Molenaar	2007 BRL V6 season
BRL Light	(Netherlands) Henry Zumbrink	2007 BRL Light season
Campeonato Brasileiro de Marcas e Pilotos	(Brazil) Geraldo Sermann	2007 Campeonato Brasileiro de Marcas e Pilotos
Chevrolet Supercars Middle East Championship	(Australia) Tarek El Gammal	2006–07 Chevrolet Supercars Middle East Championship
Danish Touringcar Championship	(Denmark) Michel Nykjær	2007 Danish Touringcar Championship
Deutsche Tourenwagen Masters	(Sweden) Mattias Ekström	2007 Deutsche Tourenwagen Masters
Deutsche Tourenwagen Masters	Teams: (Germany) Abt Sportsline	2007 Deutsche Tourenwagen Masters
Eurocup Mégane Trophy	(Portugal) Pedro Petiz	2007 Eurocup Mégane Trophy
Eurocup Mégane Trophy	Teams: (France) Tech 1 Racing	2007 Eurocup Mégane Trophy
Eurocup Mégane Trophy	Junior: (Portugal) Pedro Petiz	2007 Eurocup Mégane Trophy
Finnish Touring Car Championship	(Finland) Pasi Lähteenmäki	
Italian Touring Car Competition	(Italy) Cesare Cremonesi	2007 Italian Touring Car Competition
Italian Touring Car Competition	Teams: (Italy) Arsenio Corse	2007 Italian Touring Car Competition
New Zealand V8 Championship	(New Zealand) John McIntyre	2006–07 New Zealand V8 season
V8 Supercar Championship Series	(Australia) Garth Tander	2007 V8 Supercar Championship Series
V8 Supercar Championship Series	Teams: (Australia) HSV Dealer Team	2007 V8 Supercar Championship Series
V8 Supercar Championship Series	Manufacturers: (Australia) Holden	2007 V8 Supercar Championship Series
Fujitsu V8 Supercar Series	(Australia) Tony D'Alberto	2007 Fujitsu V8 Supercar Series
SEAT Cupra Championship	(United Kingdom) Jonathan Adam	2007 SEAT Cupra Championship
SEAT Cupra Championship	Cupra R: (United Kingdom) Harry Vaulkhard	2007 SEAT Cupra Championship
TC2000 Championship	(Argentina) Matías Rossi	2007 TC 2000 Championship

== Truck racing ==
Series	Driver	Season article
European Truck Racing Championship	(Switzerland) Markus Bösiger	2007 European Truck Racing Championship
European Truck Racing Championship	Teams: (Czech Republic) Buggyra International Racing System	2007 European Truck Racing Championship
Fórmula Truck	(Brazil) Felipe Giaffone	2007 Fórmula Truck season
Fórmula Truck	Teams: (Brazil) RM Competições	2007 Fórmula Truck season
Fórmula Truck	Manufacturers: (Germany) Volkswagen	2007 Fórmula Truck season
V8 Ute Racing Series	(Australia) Grant Johnson	2007 V8 Ute Racing Series

== Sources ==
- Driver Database list of 2007 championship winners

== See also ==
- List of motorsport championships
- List of 2007 motorcycling champions
- Auto racing
