= Lukoil Racing =

Russian motorsport organization

(Russia) Lukoil Racing
- Founded: 1997
- Team principal(s): Evgeniy Malinovskiy
- Current series: Russian Circuit Racing Series
- Former series: TCR International Series; Russian Formula 1600; Russian Honda Civic Cup; Formula Renault 2000 Eurocup; Finnish Formula 3 Russian Formula 3 Formula RUS; Supertourism; Italian Formula 3 WTCC; RTCC; RRC
- Noted drivers: Alexey Dudukalo; Nikolay Karamyshev; Roman Golikov; James Nash; Pepe Oriola; Hugo Valente
- Teams' Championships: 2016 TCR International Series; 2016 RCRS Super-Production; 2015-2016 RCRS Touring; 2012 WTCC Yokohama Teams' Trophy; 2008-11 RTCC - Touring-Light; 2004-06 Russian Formula 1600; 2004-06 Russian Honda Civic Cup; 2003-05 Formula RUS; 2003 Finnish Formula 3; 2001-03 Supertourism; 1999-00, 2002 Russian Formula 3; 1999 Tourism-1600; 1997-98 Russian Formula 3 (ASPAS); 1997-98 Tourism-1600 (ASPAS)
- Drivers' Championships: 2016 RCRS Super-Production (Chernev); 2015 RCRS Touring (Dudukalo); 2013 FIA WTCC (Muller); 2013 FIA GT SERIES Pro-Am (Afanasiev Simonsen); 2013 RCRS Touring-Light]] (Kalmanovich); 2012 Russian Ice Racing (Dudukalo); 2011 Formula Abarth (Sirotkin); 2011 RTCC - Touring-Light (Sotnikov); 2010 RTCC - Touring-Light (Kozlovskiy); 2008-09 RTCC - Touring-Light (Dudukalo); 2004-06 Russian Honda Civic Cup (Dudukalo); 2005 Formula RUS (Romaschenko); 2004 Russian Formula 1600 (Pavlovskiy); 2004 Formula RUS (Afanasyev); 2003 Finnish Formula 3 (Belicchi); 2003 Formula RUS (Baiborodov); 2003 Supertourism (Dudukalo); 2002 Russian Formula 3 (Belicchi); 2002 Supertourism (Scilla); 2001 Supertourism (Scilla); 2000 Russian Formula 3 (Pedemonte); 1999 Russian Formula 3 (Pedemonte); 1999 Supertourism (Mezentsev); 1998 Russian Formula 3 (ASPAS) (Pedemonte); 1998 Supertourism (ASPAS) (Cherevan); 1997 Russian Formula 3 (ASPAS) (Pedemonte)

Lukoil Racing team is the leading Russian motorsport organization; its operations including management, driver training and support, engineering expertise and a quality technical environment, which enables continuous development, building, testing and race preparation.

== Russian competitions ==
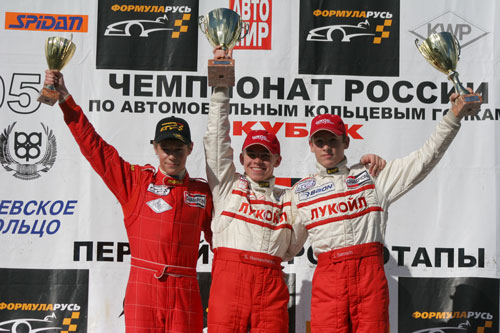
Formula RUS podium 2005

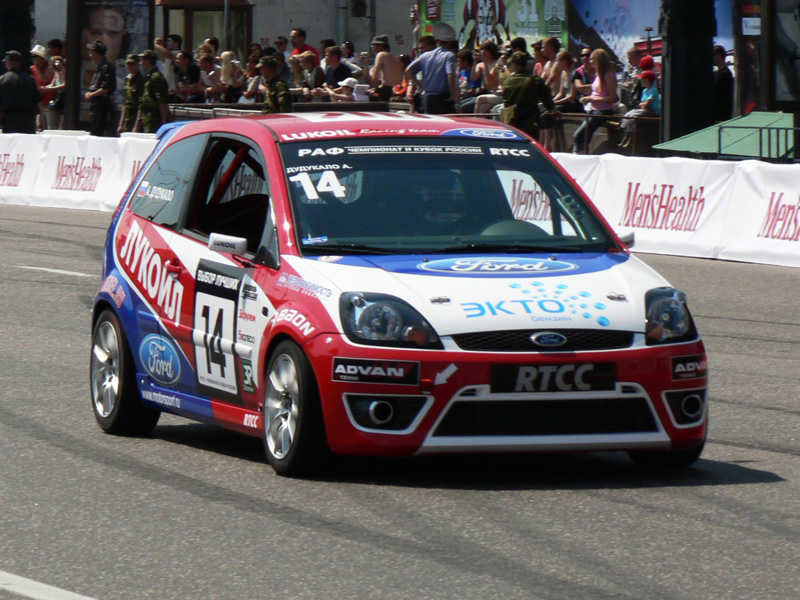
Dudukalo driving Touring-Light Ford Fiesta at Moscow City Racing 2008 show

The team was created in 1997 to participate in the Russian Formula 3 and Tourism-1600 championships. With a European level of organisation and sponsorship from the Lukoil oil company, the team became the main force in the Russian autosport arena. Both series have since ended. Lukoil Racing won 5 of 6 team titles in Russian F3 and 6 of 7 team titles in Supertourism in the seasons it participated in.

In 2003 Lukoil Racing created a junior team for Formula RUS. The team won the title three years in a row, but at the end of 2005 season decided to leave series.

Lukoil Racing easily won drivers and team titles of the Finnish Formula 3 Championship in 2003. In Touring Car racing the team chose to compete in the Honda Civic Cup where it won both titles 3 years in row. Lukoil went back with ArtLine in the Russian Formula 1600 in 2004 and won 3 team titles in a row, but only one drivers title in 2004.

From 2008 Lukoil decide to concentrate only on the RTCC Touring-Light class. The team received Ford Russia manufacturer support and won both the drivers and team titles 4 years in a row. At the end of 2011, the Touring-Light cars were sold. Lukoil Racing went to the RTCC Touring class with manufacturer support of Lada Sport.

== WTCC ==
=== 2009-2011 ===
In 2009 Lukoil's driver Aleksey Dudukalo started to participate in the SEAT León Eurocup with the Sunred team. The year after the Eurocup was folded and Lukoil decided to support Dudukalo and Sunred in the 2011 WTCC season.

=== 2012 ===
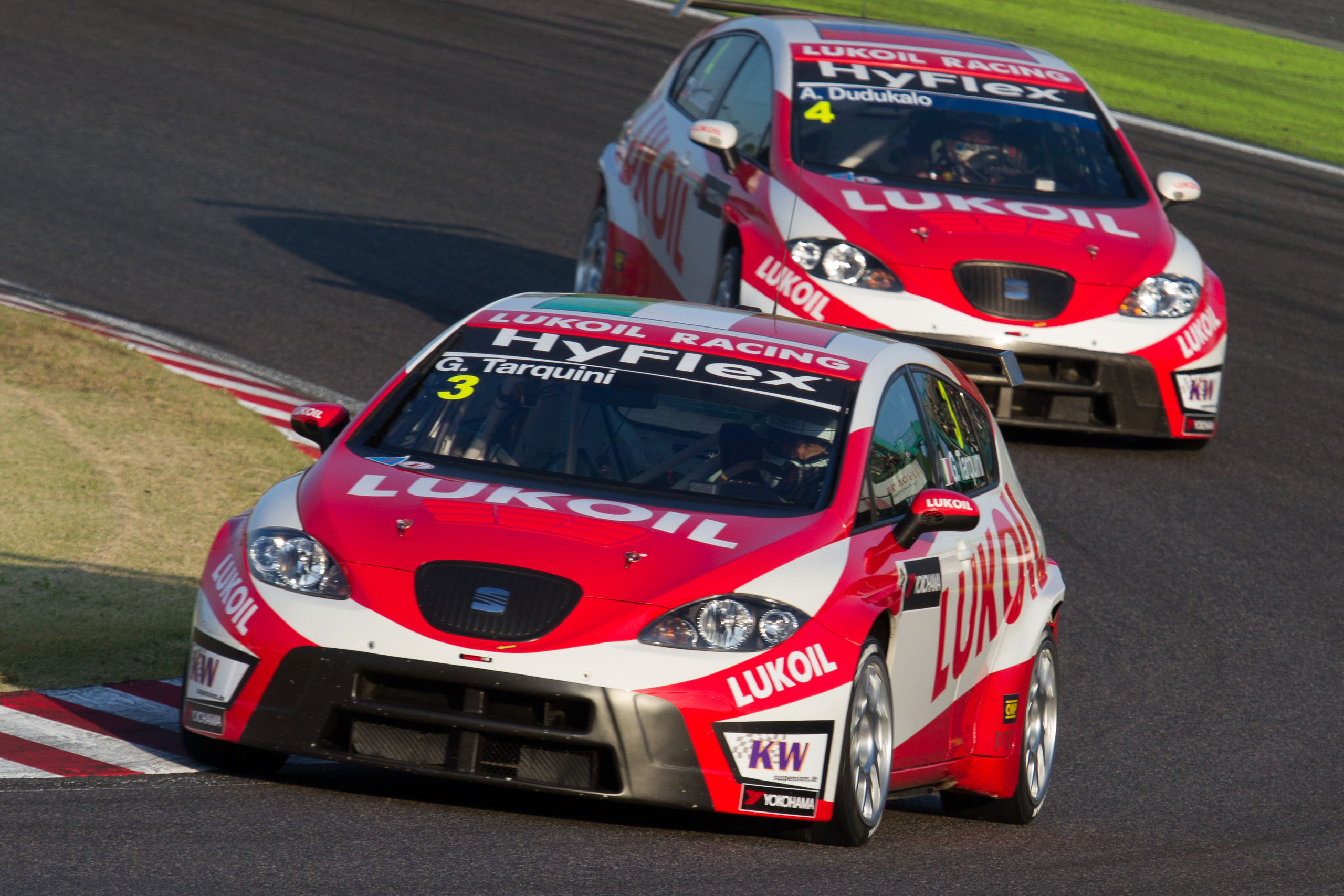
Tarquini and Dudukalo at 2012 Race of Japan

On 18 January Lukoil announced that it had decided to participate in the 2012 WTCC season, running its own team with Gabriele Tarquini and Aleksey Dudukalo as drivers. Tarquini won 1 race and finished 4th in the championship. The team won the Yokohama Teams' Trophy.

=== 2013 ===
In 2013 Lukoil Racing became a manufacturer team supported by Lada Sport. The first seat was taken by Lada's driver James Thompson. Dudukalo was replaced with Mikhail Kozlovskiy after a crash during Round 1 qualification.

== Sponsorship ==
=== Formula 3000 ===
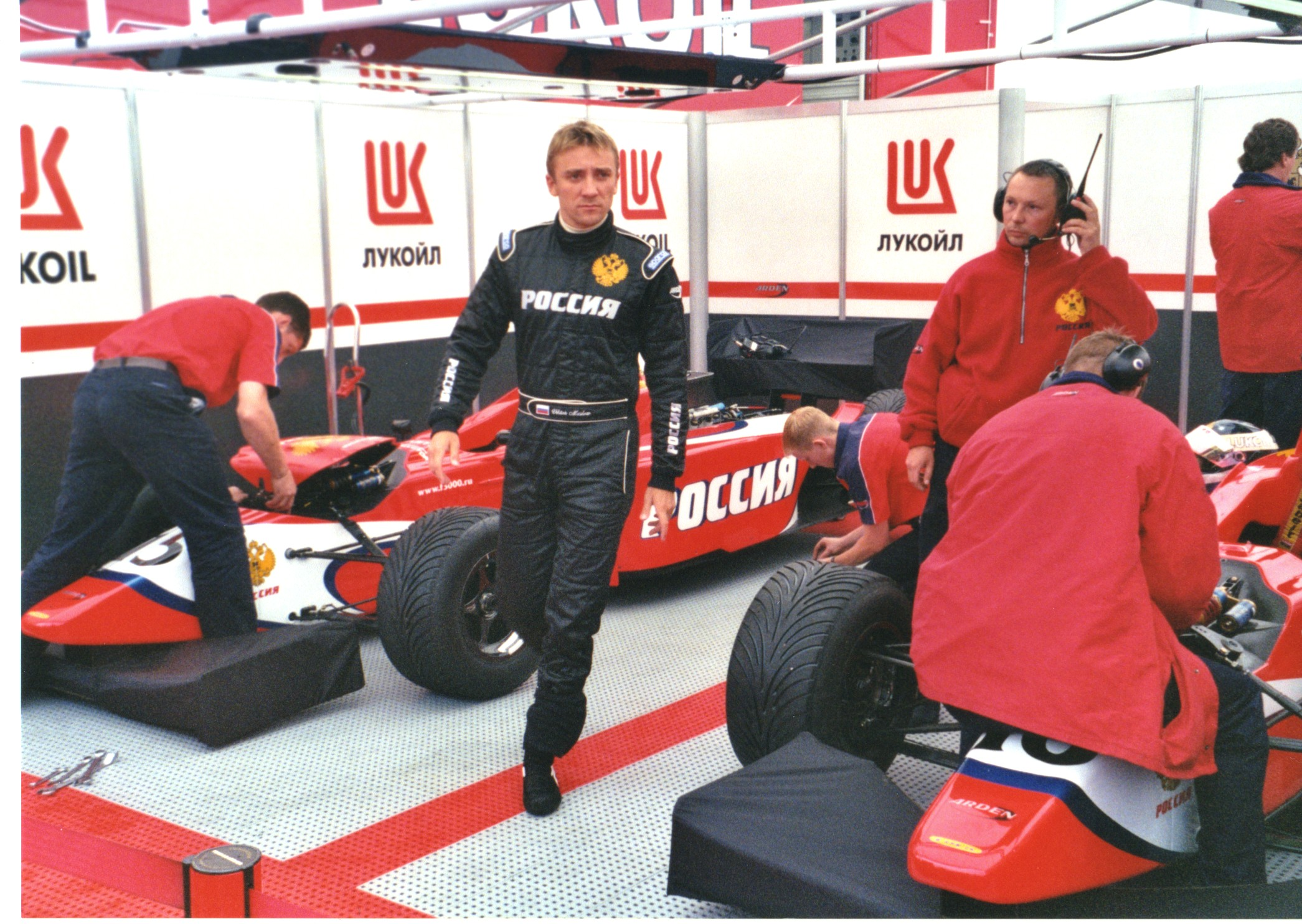
Viktor Maslov in the Arden garage, 2001

At the end of 1998 Lukoil Racing decided to participate in the International Formula 3000 Championship with its own team, including current Russian F3 drivers Alberto Pedemonte and Viktor Maslov. But Lukoil was late with 1999 season participation request and bought Christian Horner's Arden International team. The team was renamed to Lukoil Arden Racing and also started to participate in the Italian Formula 3000 series. After scoring no points in 1999 season the team was renamed to Arden Team Russia with Lukoil logotypes being replaced by the inscription РОССИЯ (Russia). In mid-2001 Arden was sold back to Horner.

=== Drivers support program ===
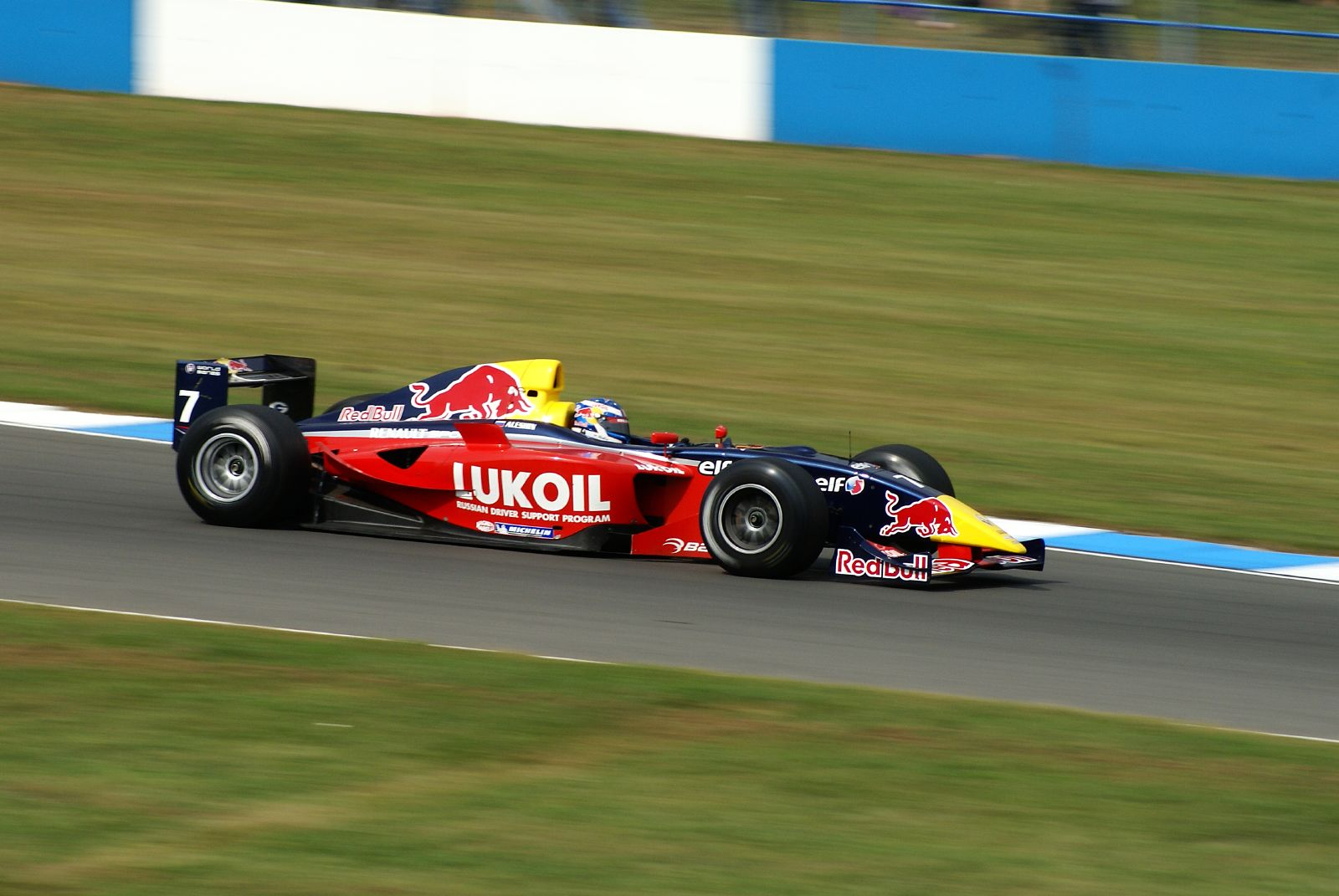
Aleshin driving for Carlin Motorsport at the Donington Park round of the 2007 Formula Renault 3.5 Series season

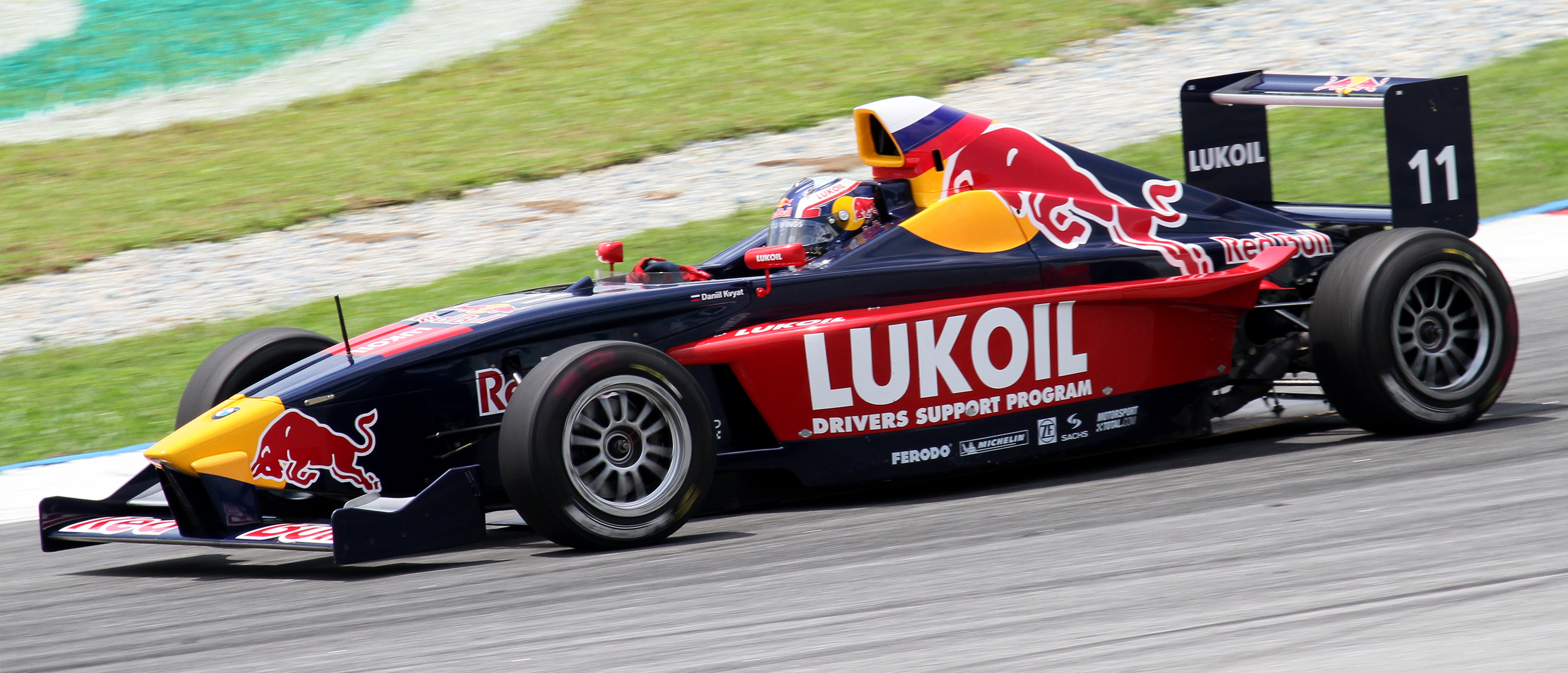
Kvyat during Race 1 of the 2010 Formula BMW Pacific season at Sepang International Circuit

In 2003 Lukoil Racing decided to create a Drivers support program to promote Russian drivers on the international racing arena. It's Lukoil's arm of the Red Bull Junior Team.

The Program started with Mikhail Aleshin in the Formula Renault 2000 Eurocup and other young drivers in Formula RUS. Lukoil Racing had its own team in Formula Renault 2000 but later it was just a sponsor for other teams. Sometimes Lukoil drivers were also part of Red Bull Junior Team (Aleshin, Kvyat). From 2006 Lukoil started to support Ukrainian, Finnish and Swedish drivers and later started to support not only young drivers but more experienced drivers.

Driver	Years	Current series
(Russia) Sergey Afanasiev	2003–	Lamborghini Super Trofeo Europe
(Russia) Alexey Dudukalo	2001–	RCRS
(Russia) Roman Golikov	2015-	RCRS
(Russia) Nikolay Karamyshev	2016-	RCRS
Former drivers
(Netherlands) Nicky Catsburg	2019	World Touring Car Cup
(Brazil) Augusto Farfus	2019	World Touring Car Cup
(France) Yvan Muller	2013	WTCC
(Russia) Sergey Sirotkin	2011–12	
(Sweden) Patrik Flodin	2010–11	
(Russia) Daniil Kvyat	2009–10	
(Russia) Mikhail Aleshin	2003–09	
(Finland) Mika Maki	2009	
(Ukraine) Serhiy Chukanov	2006–08	
(Finland) Atte Mustonen	2008	
(Russia) Yuri Baiborodov	2003–05	
(Russia) Ivan Samarin	2004–05	
(Russia) Sergey Romashenko	2005	
