= Nick Foster (British racing driver) =

British racing driver and businessman (born 1965)

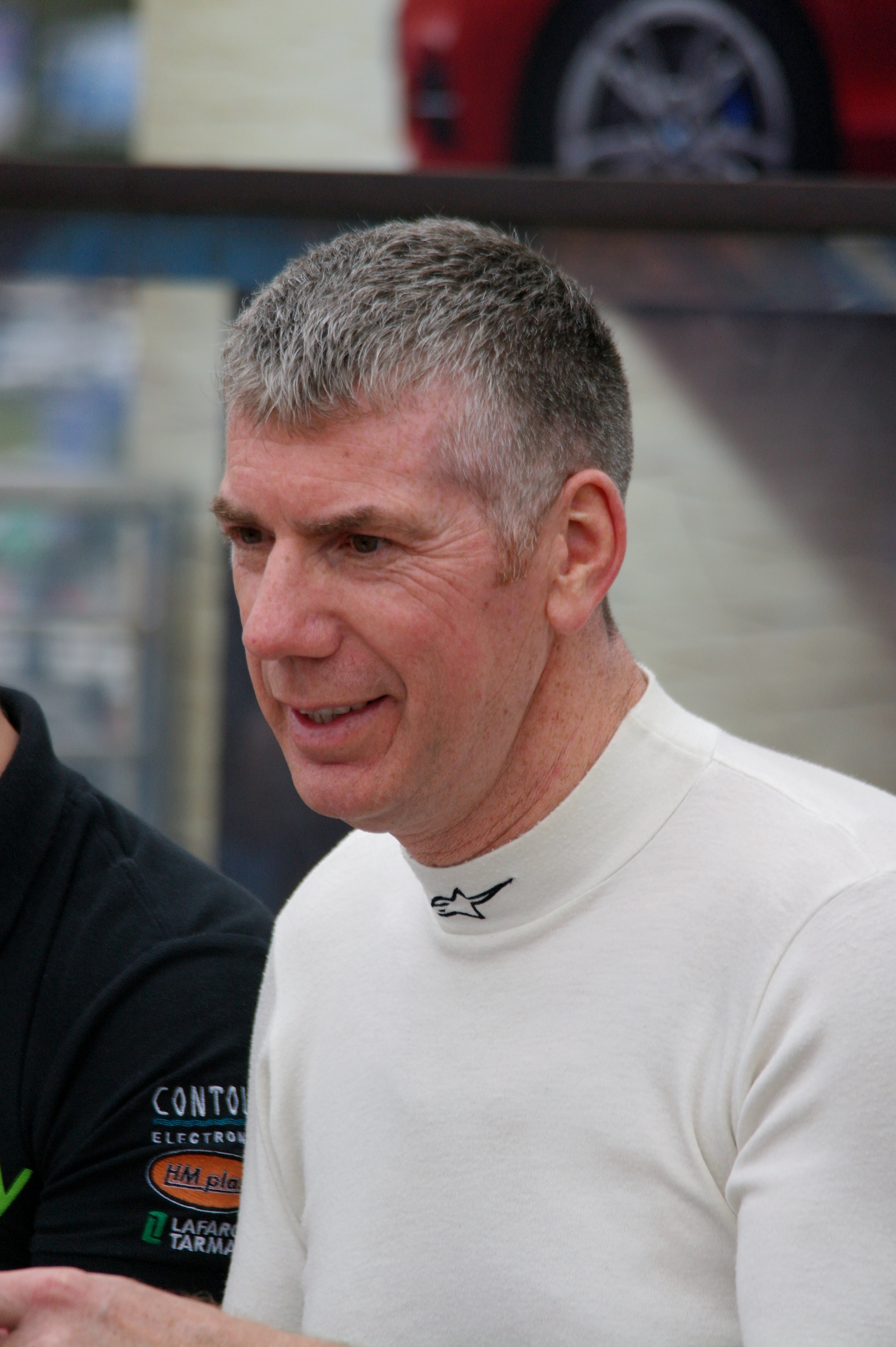
- Foster at the Brands Hatch Indy round of the 2014 British Touring Car Championship season.
- Nationality: British
- Born: 10 October 1965 (age 61) Redditch, England
- Relatives: Louis Foster (son)

British Touring Car Championship career
- Debut season: 2011
- Current team: Team IHG Rewards Club
- Car number: 8
- Starts: 121
- Wins: 0
- Podiums: 1
- Poles: 0
- Fastest laps: 0
- Best finish: 2nd in 2012

Previous series
- 2009–10 2007–08 2006: GT Cup; British GT; Radical Championship

Championship titles
- 1998–99: Silverstone Rally Sprint Group N

Nicholas John Foster (born 10 October 1965 in Redditch, Worcestershire) is a British racing driver and businessman who has driven in the British Touring Car Championship.

== Racing career ==
After spending the first part of his career in rallying, Foster switched to circuit racing in 2006, competing in the Radical Championship. In 2007, he began two years in the British GT Championship, driving a GT3 class Dodge Viper for Team RPM. Two years in the GT Cup followed.

=== British Touring Car Championship ===
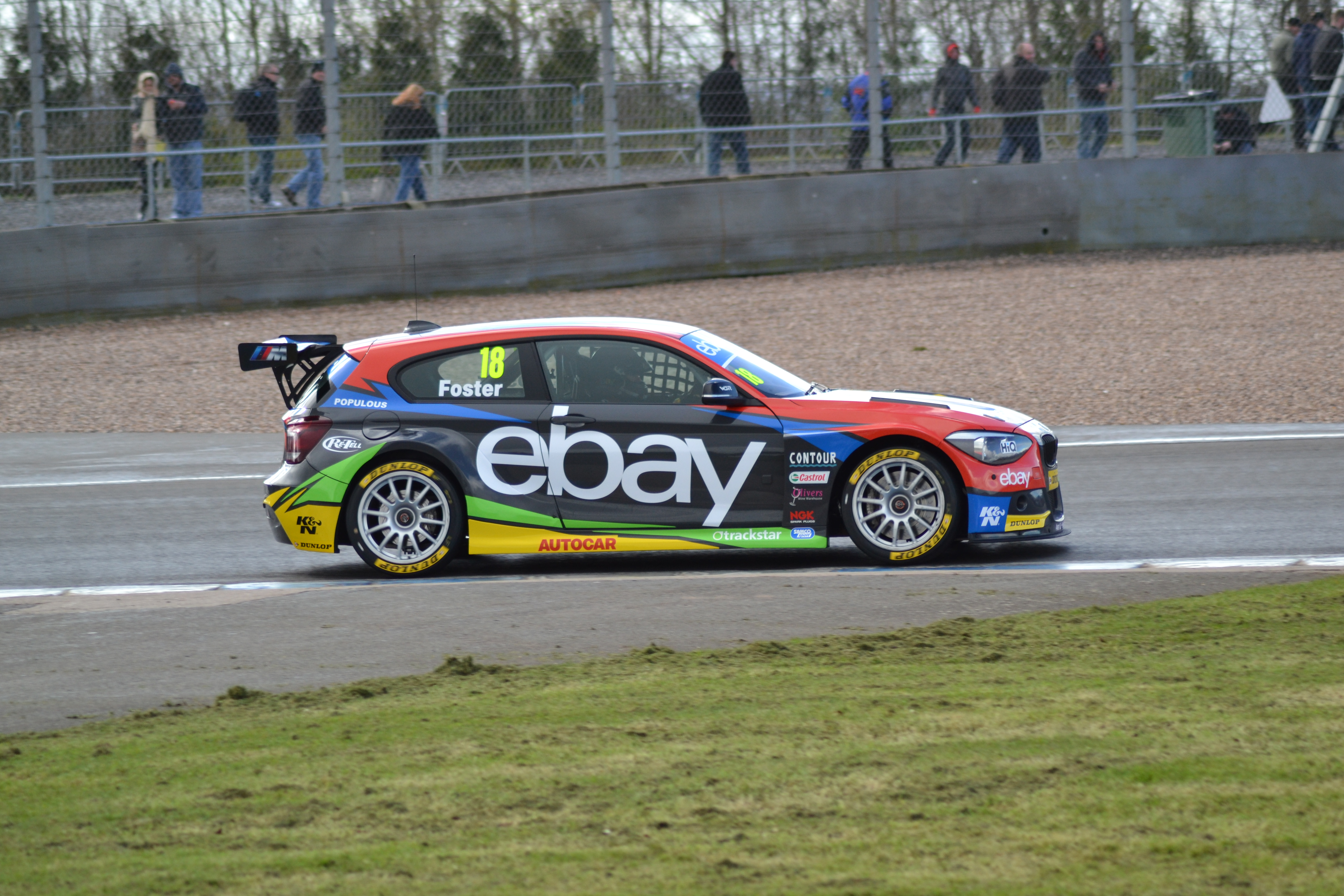
Foster driving the eBay Motors BMW 125i at Donington Park during the 2014 British Touring Car Championship season.

In 2011, Foster stepped up to the British Touring Car Championship, driving for West Surrey Racing in a BMW 320si. His best result of the season was a second-place finish in the reversed grid race at Croft, ahead of teammate Rob Collard. He stayed with the team for 2012, now rebranded as eBay Motors. Foster remained with the WSR team for 2013, with a brand new NGTC spec BMW 1 series, alongside Collard and returning former champion Colin Turkington. He stayed as part of WSR's unchanged line–up for the 2014 season. Foster announced his retirement from the BTCC on 7 January 2015.

Foster is the co-founder and CEO of Novara Technologies, a company that connects the world of Medical, Telecommunications and Industrial Electronics with standard and bespoke interconnect and cable solutions.

== Personal life ==
Foster's son, Louis Foster, is a racing driver currently competing in the IndyCar Series for Rahal Letterman Lanigan Racing.

== Racing record ==
=== Complete British GT results ===
(key) (Races in bold indicate pole position) (Races in italics indicate fastest lap)

Year	Team	Car	Class	1	2	3	4	5	6	7	8	9	10	11	12	13	14	DC	Pts
2007	Team RPM	Porsche 997 GT3 Cup	GT3	OUL; 1; 10	OUL; 2; 17	DON; 1; 9	DON; 2; 11	SNE; 1 Ret	BRH; 1; 7	BRH; 2; 10	SIL; 1; 22	THR; 1; 4	THR; 2; 9	CRO; 1; 7	CRO; 2 Ret	ROC; 1; 5	ROC; 2; 2	17th	22
2008	Team RPM	Dodge Viper Competition Coupe	GT3	OUL; 1; 6	OUL; 2; 9	KNO; 1; 17	KNO; 2 DSQ	ROC; 1; 4	ROC; 2; 4	SNE; 1; 12	SNE; 2; 8	THR; 1 Ret	THR; 2 DNS	BRH; 1 Ret	BRH; 2; 6	DON; 1; 4	SIL; 1 Ret	14th	22

=== Complete British Touring Car Championship results ===
(key) (Races in bold indicate pole position – 1 point awarded in first race) (Races in italics indicate fastest lap – 1 point awarded all races) (* signifies that driver lead race for at least one lap – 1 point awarded all races)

Year	Team	Car	1	2	3	4	5	6	7	8	9	10	11	12	13	14	15	16	17	18	19	20	21	22	23	24	25	26	27	28	29	30	Pos	Pts
2011	WSR	BMW 320si	BRH; 1; 12	BRH; 2; 14	BRH; 3; 14	DON; 1; 12	DON; 2 Ret	DON; 3; 10	THR; 1; 15	THR; 2; 16	THR; 3; 17	OUL; 1; 6	OUL; 2; 8	OUL; 3; 9	CRO; 1; 13	CRO; 2; 7	**CRO**; **3**; 2	SNE; 1; 13	SNE; 2; 11	SNE; 3; 9	KNO; 1; 11	KNO; 2; 10	KNO; 3; 9	ROC; 1; 5	ROC; 2; 5	ROC; 3; 12	BRH; 1; 10	BRH; 2; 10	**BRH**; **3**; 10	SIL; 1; 13	SIL; 2 Ret	SIL; 3; 16	14th	47
2012	eBay Motors	BMW 320si	BRH; 1; 9	BRH; 2 Ret	BRH; 3 DNS	DON; 1; 11	DON; 2; 11	DON; 3; 12	THR; 1; 14	THR; 2; 14	THR; 3; 11	OUL; 1; 9	OUL; 2; 6	OUL; 3; 8	CRO; 1; 18	CRO; 2; 10	**CRO**; **3**; 8*	SNE; 1; 11	SNE; 2; 13	SNE; 3; 13	KNO; 1; 8	KNO; 2; 5	KNO; 3; 7	ROC; 1; 10	ROC; 2; 10	ROC; 3; 9	SIL; 1; 6	SIL; 2; 10	**SIL**; **3**; 4*	BRH; 1; 15	BRH; 2; 14	BRH; 3; 13	11th	164
2013	eBay Motors	BMW 125i M Sport	BRH; 1 NC	BRH; 2; 10	BRH; 3; 13	DON; 1; 17	DON; 2; 16	DON; 3; 15	THR; 1; 24	THR; 2; 16	THR; 3; 13	OUL; 1; 12	OUL; 2; 15	OUL; 3; 8	CRO; 1; 4	CRO; 2; 7	CRO; 3; 8*	SNE; 1; 14	SNE; 2; 12	SNE; 3; 10	KNO; 1; 16	KNO; 2; 14	KNO; 3; 8	ROC; 1; 11	ROC; 2; 12	ROC; 3; 13	SIL; 1 Ret	SIL; 2; 13	SIL; 3; 11	BRH; 1 Ret	BRH; 2; 18	BRH; 3; 16	15th	98
2014	eBay Motors	BMW 125i M Sport	BRH; 1; 11	BRH; 2; 5	BRH; 3; 19	DON; 1; 18	DON; 2; 15	DON; 3; 8	THR; 1; 14	THR; 2 Ret	THR; 3; 20	OUL; 1; 8	OUL; 2 Ret	OUL; 3; 15	CRO; 1 Ret	CRO; 2; 13	CRO; 3; 7	SNE; 1 NC	SNE; 2; 14	SNE; 3 Ret	KNO; 1; 10	KNO; 2; 10	**KNO**; **3**; 4*	ROC; 1; 15	ROC; 2 Ret	ROC; 3 DNS	SIL; 1; 15	SIL; 2; 16	SIL; 3; 15	BRH; 1; 10	BRH; 2; 9	BRH; 3; 8*	16th	101
2015	Team IHG Rewards Club	BMW 125i M Sport	BRH; 1	BRH; 2	BRH; 3	DON; 1	DON; 2	DON; 3	THR; 1	THR; 2	THR; 3	OUL; 1	OUL; 2	OUL; 3	CRO; 1	CRO; 2	CRO; 3	SNE; 1	SNE; 2	SNE; 3	KNO; 1	KNO; 2	KNO; 3	ROC; 1; 16	ROC; 2; 16	ROC; 3; 12	SIL; 1	SIL; 2	SIL; 3	BRH; 1	BRH; 2	BRH; 3	24th	4
