= Sergey Afanasyev (racing driver) =

Russian racing driver

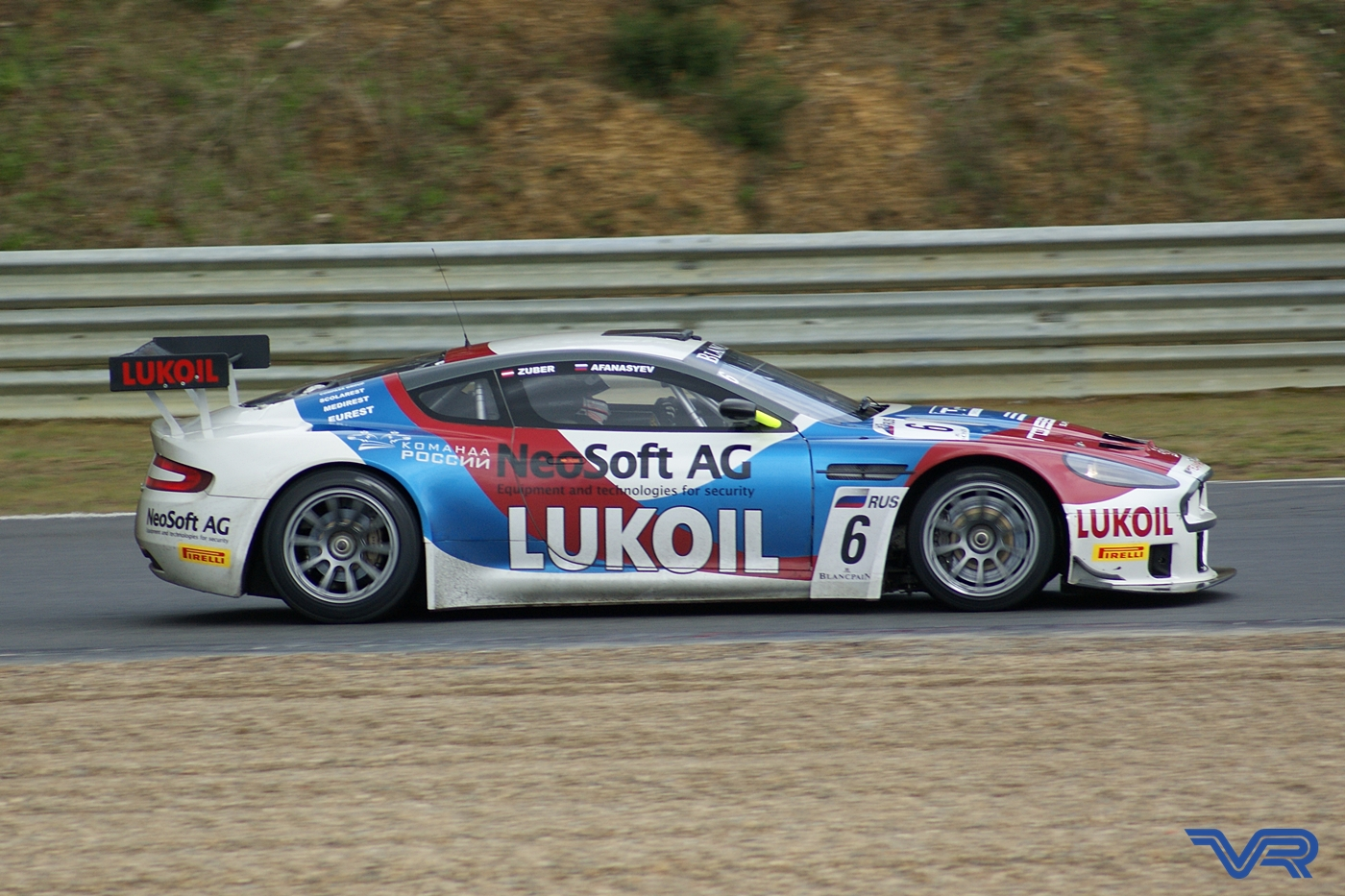
- Afanasyev in 2012
- Nationality: Russian
- Born: Sergey Andreyevich Afanasyev; 25 March 1988 (age 38) Moscow, Soviet Union

GT World Challenge career
- Current team: Black Falcon
- Categorisation: FIA Gold (2012); FIA Silver (2013–)
- Car number: 5
- Starts: 2

Previous series
- 2020 2017–2019 2015–2016 2014 2013 2013 2012 2011 2010 2009 2008 2008 2007 2006 2006 2005 2005 2003–2004: GT World Challenge; Lamborghini Super Trofeo; TCR International; FIA GT Series; ADAC GT Masters; FIA GT Series; FIA GT1; Auto GP; FIA Formula 2 International Formula Master; Formula Renault 3.5 Series; International Formula Master; Formula 3 Euro Series; Formula Renault 2.0 NEC; Formule Renault 2.0 Suisse; Formula Renault 2.0 Germany; Formula Renault 2.0 Eurocup; Formula RUS

Championship titles
- 2019 2013 2004: Lamborghini Super Trofeo; FIA GT Series; Formula RUS

Sergey Andreyevich Afanasyev (Russian: Серге́й Андре́евич Афана́сьев, IPA: [sʲɪrˈɡʲej ɐnˈdrʲe(j)ɪvʲɪtɕ ɐfɐˈnasʲjɪf]; born 25 March 1988) is a Russian racing driver, holder of honour "Master of sports of Russia".

== Education ==
=== School ===
Afanasyev graduated from school (Moscow) in 2004 with the gold medal.

=== Higher education ===
2009 – Academic Law University (Russian Academy of Science) // Law (Honours degree)

2010 – Lomonosov Moscow State University // Marketing

2013 – Moscow Socio-Pedagogical Institute // Pedagogics and psychology

== Career ==
=== Early career ===
Afanasyev began his racing career 1998 in baggy-kart where immediately started to achieve high results. Since 1999, he started to take part in go-kart competition.

1999 – bronze in Russian Championship in Mini

2000 – Champion of Russia in Raket

2001 – bronze in Russian Championship in ICA-junior

2002 – Champion of Russia in ICA-junior

2002 – Champion of Russia in Oka-junior (winter track racing)

=== Formula RUS and Formula Renault 2000 ===
Afanasyev began his racing career in openwheels in 2003 in the Formula RUS. That year saw him take three wins in this series. The next year he took championship title. He also took part in eight Formula Renault Monza races for BVM Minardi Junior Team, finishing the year in 13th place.

The following year, Afanasyev took part in a full Formula Renault 2.0 season, driving with Lukoil Racing team. He finished tenth overall in that year. He also contested thirteen races of the Eurocup Formula Renault 2.0, hugely crashed at Bilbao and taking a best race result of fourth at Oschersleben to finish twenty-fourth in the standings.

In 2006, Afanasiev moved up to new Formula Renault 2.0 Northern European Cup championship for Lukoil Racing team. He finished eighth overall in that year. He also contested ten races of the Formule Renault 2.0 Suisse championship and finishing as runner-up.

=== Formula 3 Euro Series ===
In 2007, Afanasyev made his debut in Formula 3 Euro Series for HBR Motorsport team. He also contested in Masters of Formula 3 at Zolder, but he did not qualify and missed the race.

=== International Formula Master ===
Afanasyev took part in International Formula Master for two years with JD Motorsport team. In first season he won one race and finished eighth overall. He also contested in six Formula Renault 3.5 Series races for the KTR team and failed to score a championship point.

Afanasyev remained in the series for 2009 season and improved to second place overall.

=== FIA Formula Two Championship ===
In 2010, Afanasyev graduated to Formula Two, finishing third in the standings with four podium finishes which gave him the right to receive the F1 licence.

=== Auto GP ===
Afanasyev switched to Auto GP for 2011, joining team champions DAMS. He was the only who scored three wins, but due to problems with British visa, he missed Donington round and finished the season just on third place.

=== FIA GT1 World Championship ===
In 2012, Afanasyev and his main sponsor Lukoil decide to leave open-wheels and join FIA GT1 World Championship with Valmon Racing Team Russia in Aston Martin. His partner that year was Andreas Zuber.

=== GT racing ===
In the end of 2012, Afanasyev, together with Bernd Schneider, finished fourth in the Baku City Challenge.

In 2013, Afanasyev partnered with HTP Gravity Charouz team on Mercedes SLS AMG GT3, and was joined by Andreas Simonsen. At the end of the year, they won the Championship.

The following year, Afanasyev left the championship and was joined by Stef Dusseldorp.

=== Touring Car Racing ===
Together with Lukoil Sergey moved to the front wheel driving cars and in 2015–2016 took part in the new championship – TCR International Series achieving podiums and the pole-position.

=== Lamborghini Super Trofeo ===
In 2017. Afanasyev and Lukoil made a mutual decision to terminate the interaction. He drove two years with ArtLine racing team in the European and Middle East championships in ProAm category achieving the best result as the runner-up.

Lamborghini Super Trofeo championship was selected by Jonnesway tools as the General sponsor of Afanasiev, due to the good price-to-performance ratio.

Afanasyev joined the Bonaldi team in 2019 joined by Danny Kroes in the car. Together they won the Chempionship. The best results were achieved in Zandvoort (hometrack of Danny), where they won both races in front of the Dutch fans.

=== Coming back to GT racing ===
In November 2019, Afanasyev joined the Black Falcon racing team for the Kyalami 9 Hours race which was the part of the International GT Challenge. His partners were Patrick Assenheimer and Hubert Haupt in silver class. They were leading most part of the race, but after an accident in heavy rain they finished second.

The next race was Bathurst 12 Hours. Haupt was not able to join so he was replaced by Michele Beretta. They were leading until the last four hours of the race. Issues with the car after a small contact with the wall pushed them back; they finished third.

== Racing record ==
=== Career summary ===
Season	Series	Team	Races	Wins	Poles	F/Laps	Podiums	Points	Position
2003	Formula RUS	Lukoil-Serebryaniy dojd'-Junior	14	0	1	1	5	39	4th
2004	Formula RUS	Lukoil Racing Team Junior	14	10	11	12	14	63	**1st**
2004	Formula Renault Monza	BVM Minardi Junior Team	8	0	0	0	0	32	13th
2005	Formula Renault 2.0 Germany	Lukoil Racing Team	16	0	0	0	0	155	10th
2005	Eurocup Formula Renault 2.0	Lukoil Racing Team	13	0	0	0	0	0	24th
2005	Formula RUS	Lukoil Racing Team-Formula Rus	1	1	1	1	1	22	16th
2006	Formula Renault 2.0 Northern European Cup	Lukoil Racing	14	1	2	1	2	167	8th
2006	Formule Renault 2.0 Suisse	Lukoil Racing	10	6	8	8	9	230	**2nd**
2006	Formula RUS	Formula Rus	2	2	2	1	2	43	10th
2007	Formula 3 Euro Series	HBR Motorsport	18	0	0	0	0	0	21st
2007	Masters of Formula 3	HBR Motorsport	1	0	0	0	0	N/A	NC
2008	International Formula Master	JD Motorsport	16	1	1	0	2	28	8th
2008	Formula Renault 3.5 Series	KTR	6	0	0	0	0	0	34th
2009	International Formula Master	JD Motorsport	16	1	0	1	9	68	**2nd**
2010	FIA Formula Two Championship	MotorSport Vision	18	0	1	1	4	157	**3rd**
2011	Auto GP	DAMS	12	1	3	1	4	117	**3rd**
2012	FIA GT1 World Championship	Valmon Racing Team Russia	6	0	0	0	0	0	31st

=== Complete Eurocup Formula Renault 2.0 results ===
(key) (Races in bold indicate pole position; races in italics indicate fastest lap)

Year	Entrant	1	2	3	4	5	6	7	8	9	10	11	12	13	14	15	16	DC	Points
2005	Lukoil Racing Team	ZOL; 1 Ret	ZOL; 2; 25	VAL; 1 Ret	VAL; 2; 29	LMS; 1	LMS; 2	BIL; 1 Ret	BIL; 2 DNS	OSC; 1; 4	OSC; 2 Ret	DON; 1; 21	DON; 2; 11	EST; 1; 25	EST; 2; 15	MNZ; 1; 18	MNZ; 2 Ret	24th	9

=== Complete Formula Renault 2.0 NEC results ===
(key) (Races in bold indicate pole position) (Races in italics indicate fastest lap)

Year	Entrant	1	2	3	4	5	6	7	8	9	10	11	12	13	14	15	16	DC	Points
2006	Lukoil Racing	OSC; 1; 5	OSC; 2; 2	SPA; 1	SPA; 2	NÜR; 1; 15	NÜR; 2 Ret	ZAN; 1; 6	ZAN; 2; 6	OSC; 1 Ret	OSC; 2; 4	**ASS**; **1** Ret	**ASS**; **2**; 1	AND; 1; 15	AND; 2; 6	SAL; 1; 5	SAL; 2; 16	8th	167

=== Complete Formula 3 Euro Series results ===
(key) (Races in bold indicate pole position) (Races in italics indicate fastest lap)

Year	Entrant	Chassis	Engine	1	2	3	4	5	6	7	8	9	10	11	12	13	14	15	16	17	18	19	20	DC	Points
2007	HBR Motorsport	Dallara F305/045	Mercedes	HOC; 1; 17	HOC; 2; 20	BRH; 1 Ret	BRH; 2; 16	NOR; 1 DSQ	NOR; 2 Ret	MAG; 1; 20	MAG; 2 Ret	MUG; 1; 17	MUG; 2; 12	ZAN; 1; 13	ZAN; 2 Ret	NÜR; 1; 14	NÜR; 2; 12	CAT; 1; 18	CAT; 2; 12	NOG; 1; 19	NOG; 2; 20	HOC; 1 DNS	HOC; 2 DNS	21st	0

=== Complete Formula Renault 3.5 Series results ===
(key) (Races in bold indicate pole position) (Races in italics indicate fastest lap)

Year	Team	1	2	3	4	5	6	7	8	9	10	11	12	13	14	15	16	17	Pos	Points
2008	KTR	MNZ; 1	MNZ; 2	SPA; 1	SPA; 2	MON; 1	SIL; 1	SIL; 2	HUN; 1	HUN; 2	NÜR; 1	NÜR; 2	LMS; 1; 17	LMS; 2; 23	EST; 1; 19	EST; 2; 19	CAT; 1 Ret	CAT; 2 Ret	34th	0

=== Complete FIA Formula Two Championship results ===
(key) (Races in bold indicate pole position) (Races in italics indicate fastest lap)

Year	1	2	3	4	5	6	7	8	9	10	11	12	13	14	15	16	17	18	DC	Points
2010	SIL; 1; 3	SIL; 2; 6	MAR; 1; 8	MAR; 2; 7	MNZ; 1 Ret	MNZ; 2; 2	ZOL; 1; 4	ZOL; 2; 15	ALG; 1; 9	ALG; 2; 12	BRH; 1; 6	BRH; 2; 5	BRN; 1; 3	BRN; 2; 4	**OSC**; **1**; 4	OSC; 2; 3	VAL; 1; 5	VAL; 2; 5	**3rd**	**157**

=== Complete Auto GP results ===
(key) (Races in bold indicate pole position) (Races in italics indicate fastest lap)

Year	Entrant	1	2	3	4	5	6	7	8	9	10	11	12	13	14	Pos	Points
2011	DAMS	MNZ; 1; 4	MNZ; 2; 10	HUN; 1; 5	HUN; 2; 1	BRN; 1; 8	BRN; 2; 9	DON; 1	DON; 2	OSC; 1; 1	OSC; 2; 2	**VAL**; **1**; 1	VAL; 2; 14	MUG; 1; 6	MUG; 2; 13	**3rd**	**117**

=== FIA GT competition results ===
==== GT1 World Championship results ====
Year	Team	Car	1	2	3	4	5	6	7	8	9	10	11	12	13	14	15	16	17	18	Pos	Points
2012	Valmon Racing Team Russia	Aston Martin	NOG; QR; 13	NOG; CR; 13	ZOL; QR; Ret	ZOL; CR; 15	NAV; QR; 15	NAV; QR; 13	SVK; QR	SVK; CR	ALG; QR	ALG; CR	SVK; QR	SVK; CR	MOS; QR	MOS; CR	NUR; QR	NUR; CR	DON; QR	DON; CR	31st	0

==== FIA GT Series results ====
Year	Class	Team	Car	1	2	3	4	5	6	7	8	9	10	11	12	Pos.	Points
2013	Pro-Am	HTP Gravity Charouz	Mercedes-Benz	NOG; QR; 12	NOG; CR; 16	**ZOL**; **QR**; **6**	ZOL; CR; 7	**ZAN**; **QR**; **7**	ZAN; QR; 12	**SVK**; **QR**; **6**	SVK; CR; 1	NAV; QR; 4	NAV; CR; 4	**BAK**; **QR**; **6**	BAK; CR; Ret	**1st**	**136**

=== Complete TCR International Series results ===
(key) (Races in bold indicate pole position) (Races in italics indicate fastest lap)

Year	Team	Car	1	2	3	4	5	6	7	8	9	10	11	12	13	14	15	16	17	18	19	20	21	22	DC	Points
2015	Team Craft-Bamboo Lukoil	SEAT León Cup Racer	MYS; 1; 3	MYS; 2 Ret	CHN; 1; 10	CHN; 2; 11	ESP; 1; 2	ESP; 2; 9	POR; 1; 11	POR; 2 Ret	ITA; 1; 11†	ITA; 2 DNS	AUT; 1; 8	AUT; 2; 4	RUS; 1; 5	RUS; 2; 4	RBR; 1; 6	RBR; 2; 4	SIN; 1; 5	SIN; 2; 18†	THA; 1; 3	THA; 2; 7	MAC; 1; 10	MAC; 2 Ret	7th	134
2016	Team Craft-Bamboo Lukoil	SEAT León TCR	**BHR**; **1**; 4	BHR; 2; 5	POR; 1; 5	POR; 2; 4	BEL; 1; 9	BEL; 2; 9	ITA; 1; 4	ITA; 2 Ret	AUT; 1 Ret	AUT; 2; 2	GER; 1; 4	GER; 2; 4	RUS; 1; 13	RUS; 2; 7	THA; 1; 9	THA; 2; 7	SIN; 1; 6	SIN; 2 Ret	MYS; 1; 9	MYS; 2; 7	MAC; 1 Ret	MAC; 2 DNS	9th	141

^{†} Driver did not finish the race, but was classified as he completed over 75% of the race distance.
