= List of 2007 motorcycling champions =

This list of 2007 motorcycling champions is a list of national or international touring motorcycle sport series with a Championship decided by the points or positions earned by a driver from multiple races.

== Road racing ==
- Grand Prix
  - World MotoGP Championship:2007 MotoGP season
  Casey Stoner (Australia)
  - World 250cc Championship:2007 250cc season
  Jorge Lorenzo (Spain)
  - World 125cc Championship:2007 125cc season
  Gábor Talmácsi (Hungary)
  - Red Bull MotoGP Rookies Cup
  Johann Zarco (France)
  - European 250cc Championship
  Alvaro Molina (Spain)
  - European 125cc Championship
  Alen Győrfi (Hungary)
  - All Japan Road Race 250cc Championship
  Youichi Ui (Japan)
  - All Japan Road Race 125cc Championship
  Hiroomi Iwata (Japan)
  - British 125GP Championship
  Luke Jones (United Kingdom)
  - Italian 125cc Championship
  Roberto Lacalendola (Italy)
  - Spanish 125cc Championship
  Stefan Bradl (Germany)
  - German 125cc Championship
  Georg Fröhlich (Germany)
  - Australian 125cc Championship
  Glenn Scott (Australia)
- Superbike racing
  - Superbike World Championship:2007 Superbike World Championship season
  James Toseland (United Kingdom)
  - British Superbike Championship:2007 British Superbike season
  Ryuichi Kiyonari (Japan)
  - AMA Superbike
  Ben Spies (United States)
  - Parts Canada Superbike Championship
  Jordan Szoke (Canada)
  - Italian Superbike Championship
  Marco Borciani (Italy)
  - German Superbike Championship
  Martin Bauer (Austria)
  - All Japan Road Race Superbike Championship
  Atsushi Watanabe (Japan)
  - Australian Superbike Championship
  Jamie Stauffer (Australia)
  - South African Superbike Championship
  Arushen Moodley (South Africa)
  - Finnish Superbike Championship
  Kari Vehniäinen (Finland)
- Supersport racing
  - Supersport World Championship: 2007 Supersport World Championship season
  Kenan Sofuoğlu (Turkey)
  - South African SuperSport
  Christopher Leeson (South Africa)
  - AMA Formula Xtreme
  Josh Hayes
- Superstock
  - FIM STK1000
  Niccolò Canepa (Italy)
  - FIM STK600
  Maxime Berger (France)
  - AMA Superstock
  Jamie Hacking (United Kingdom)
  - FIM Superside
  Tim Reeves (United Kingdom) & Patrick Farrance (United Kingdom)

== Speedway ==
  - Speedway
    - World
      - Speedway World Championship
        Nicki Pedersen (Denmark)
      - World Cup
        Poland
      - Individual Speedway Junior World Championship
        Emil Saifutdinov (Russia)
      - Team Speedway Junior World Championship
        Poland
    - Europe
      - Individual Speedway European Championship
        Jurica Pavlič (Croatia)
      - European Pairs Speedway Championship
        Czech Republic
      - Individual Speedway Junior European Championship
        Nicolai Klindt (Denmark)
    - British Speedway
      - British Speedway Championship
        Chris Harris
      - British Speedway Under 21 Championship
        Ben Wilson
      - British Speedway Under 18 Championship
        Tai Woffinden
      - Elite League Champions
        Coventry Bees
        - Elite League Knockout Cup Winners
          Coventry Bees
        - Craven Shield Winners
          Coventry Bees
        - Pairs Championship
          Poole Pirates
        - Riders Championship
          Nicki Pedersen (Denmark)
      - Premier League Champions
        Rye House Rockets
        - Four-Team Championship
          Isle of Wight Islanders
        - Pairs Championship
          Isle of Wight Islanders
        - Riders Championship
          James Wright (United Kingdom)
        - Premier Trophy
          King's Lynn Stars
      - Conference League Champions
        Scunthorpe Scorpions
        - Four-Team Championship
          Scunthorpe Scorpions
        - Riders Championship
          Tai Woffinden (United Kingdom)
    - Polish Speedway
      - Individual Speedway Polish Championship
        Rune Holta
      - Polish Pairs Speedway Championship
        Unia Tarnów
      - Speedway Ekstraliga
        Unia Leszno
      - Pierwsza Liga
        Stal Gorzów Wielkopolski
      - Druga Liga
        Kolejarz Russell
      - Individual Speedway Junior Polish Championship
        Paweł Hlib
      - Polish Pairs Speedway Junior Championship
        Unibax Toruń
      - Team Speedway Junior Polish Championship
        RKM Rybnik
    - Swedish Speedway
      - Elitserien
        Dackarna
      - Allsvenskan
        Lejonen

== Grasstrack ==
- Grasstrack
  - ACU British Grasstrack Championships
    - 250cc Solo
      Paul Cooper
    - 350cc Solo
      Jason Handley
    - 500cc Solo
      Glen Phillips
    - 500cc Sidecar
      Shaun Harvey/Danny Hogg
    - 1000cc Left Hand Sidecar
      Terry Nicholas & Mike Raymond
    - 1000cc Right Hand Sidecar
      Colin Blackbourn & Paul Whitelam Jnr
    - ACU British Under 21
      Lewis Denham

== Motocross ==
- Motocross
  - AMA Motocross 250
  Grant Langston (South Africa)
  - AMA Motocross 125
  Ryan Villopoto (United States)
  - FIM MX1 World Motocross Champions
  Steve Ramon (Belgium)
  - FIM MX2 World Motocross Champions
  Antonio Cairoli (Italy)
  - FIM MX3 World Motocross Champions
  Yves Demaria (France)
  - FIM Sidecarcross World Champions: 2007 Sidecarcross world championship
  Daniël Willemsen (Netherlands) / Reto Grutter (Switzerland)
  - All-Japan Motocross IA2
  Hiroaki Arai (Japan)
  - All-Japan Motocross IA1
  Akira Narita (Japan)
  - All-Japan Motocross Women's
  Saya Suzuki (Japan)

== Supercross ==
- Supercross
  - AMA Supercross 250
  James Stewart Jr. (United States)
  - AMA Supercross 125 West
  Ryan Villopoto (United States)
  - AMA Supercross 125 East
  Ben Townley (New Zealand)
  - Supercross World Championship
  James Stewart Jr. (United States)

== Flat Track ==
- Flat track
  - AMA Flat Track Grand National
  Kenny Coolbeth

== Trials ==
- Motorcycle trials
  - World Trials Championship
    - Outdoor Series
      Antoni Bou (Spain)
    - Indoor Series
      Antoni Bou (Spain)
  - All-Japan Trials Championship
    Ken'ichi Kuroyama (Japan)
  - British Solo Trials Championship
    Graham Jarvis

== Enduro ==
- Enduro
  - World Enduro Championship
    - E1
      Juha Salminen (Finland)
    - E2
      Mika Ahola (Finland)
    - E3
      Iván Cervantes (Spain)

== Drag racing ==
- National Hot Rod Association (NHRA)
  - NHRA POWERade Drag Racing Series
    - Pro Stock Motorcycle
    Matt Smith (United States)

== See also ==
- List of motorsport championships
- List of 2007 motorsport champions
- Motorcycle sport
