= Jamie Smyth =

British racing driver (born 1976)

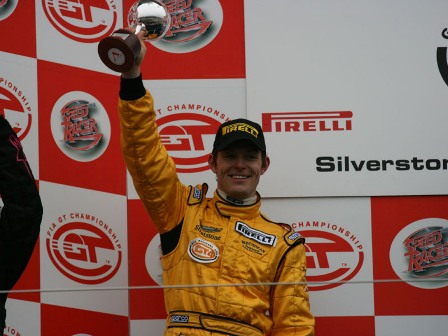
- Nationality: (United Kingdom) British
- Born: 30 June 1976 (age 50)

Previous series
- 2008-2014 2008 2004-2009 2004 2002 2000-2003: Britcar; GT4 European Series; British GT; Formula Ford 1600 Southern; British Formula Ford; Formula Ford 1600 North West

Championship titles
- 2007 2004 2003: British GT (GTC); Formula Ford 1600 Southern; Formula Ford 1600 North West

Jamie Smyth (born 30 June 1976) is a British racing driver, best known for winning the 2007 British GTC Championship.

== Career ==
Smyth began racing in Karts before moving onto car racing in 2000 driving a Formula Ford.

Smyth's most notable achievement was winning the 2007 British GTC Championship, driving a Porsche 996 GT3. Other achievements include finishing second overall and winning his class in the 2008 Britcar 24 Hour driving an Aston Martin N24, as well as winning the North West Formula Ford 1600 Championship in 2003, and the Southern Formula Ford 1600 Championship in 2004.
