= 2007 British GT Championship =

Sports car racing season

Seasons
- ← 2006 2008 →

The 2007 British GT season consisted of a fourteen-round series of sports car racing in the British GT Championship. Each race meeting consisted of two one-hour endurance races, except for those at Snetterton and Silverstone, which were both single two-hour races. All of the races took place in England in 2007. Two classes raced: the more powerful GT3 and the less powerful GTC class. This was the last time the GTC class raced, before the inception of the FIA GT4 class takes over in 2008.

== Entry list ==
2007 Entry List
| Team | No. | Drivers | Class | Chassis | Engine | Rounds |
|---|---|---|---|---|---|---|
| (United Kingdom) Barwell Motorsport | 1 | (United Kingdom) Jonny Cocker | GT3 | Aston Martin DBRS9 | Aston Martin 6.0L V12 | All |
| (United Kingdom) Barwell Motorsport | 1 | (United Kingdom) Paul Drayson | GT3 | Aston Martin DBRS9 | Aston Martin 6.0L V12 | All |
| (United Kingdom) Barwell Motorsport | 2 | (United Kingdom) Michael Bentwood | GT3 | Aston Martin DBRS9 | Aston Martin 6.0L V12 | All |
| (United Kingdom) Barwell Motorsport | 2 | (United Kingdom) Tom Alexander | GT3 | Aston Martin DBRS9 | Aston Martin 6.0L V12 | All |
| (United Kingdom) Barwell Motorsport | 3 | (United Kingdom) Ben de Zille Butler | GT3 | Aston Martin DBRS9 | Aston Martin 6.0L V12 | All |
| (United Kingdom) Barwell Motorsport | 3 | (United Kingdom) Guy Harrington | GT3 | Aston Martin DBRS9 | Aston Martin 6.0L V12 | All |
| (United Kingdom) Team 4Car | 4 | (United Kingdom) Fergus Campbell | GT3 | Porsche 997 GT3 Cup | Porsche 3.6L Flat-6 | All |
| (United Kingdom) Team 4Car | 4 | (United Kingdom) Mark Cole | GT3 | Porsche 997 GT3 Cup | Porsche 3.6L Flat-6 | 1–4, 6–10 |
| (United Kingdom) Team 4Car | 4 | (United Kingdom) Lee Atkins | GT3 | Porsche 997 GT3 Cup | Porsche 3.6L Flat-6 | 5 |
| (United Kingdom) Team 4Car | 4 | (United Kingdom) Simon Blanckley | GT3 | Porsche 997 GT3 Cup | Porsche 3.6L Flat-6 | 11–12 |
| (United Kingdom) Team 4Car | 4 | (United Kingdom) George MacKintosh | GT3 | Porsche 997 GT3 Cup | Porsche 3.6L Flat-6 | 13–14 |
| (United States) Team RPM | 5 | (United Kingdom) Henry Fletcher | GT3 | Dodge Viper Competition Coupe | Dodge 8.3L V10 | 3–10, 13–14 |
| (United States) Team RPM | 5 | (United Kingdom) James Saggers | GT3 | Dodge Viper Competition Coupe | Dodge 8.3L V10 | 3–7 |
| (United States) Team RPM | 5 | (United Kingdom) Nick Padmore | GT3 | Dodge Viper Competition Coupe | Dodge 8.3L V10 | 8 |
| (United States) Team RPM | 5 | (United Kingdom) Tim Harvey | GT3 | Dodge Viper Competition Coupe | Dodge 8.3L V10 | 9–10 |
| (United States) Team RPM | 5 | (United Kingdom) Paul O'Neill | GT3 | Dodge Viper Competition Coupe | Dodge 8.3L V10 | 11–12 |
| (United States) Team RPM | 5 | (United Kingdom) Steve Clark | GT3 | Dodge Viper Competition Coupe | Dodge 8.3L V10 | 11–14 |
| (United States) Team RPM | 6 | (United Kingdom) Alex Mortimer | GT3 | Dodge Viper Competition Coupe | Dodge 8.3L V10 | All |
| (United States) Team RPM | 6 | (United Kingdom) Bradley Ellis | GT3 | Dodge Viper Competition Coupe | Dodge 8.3L V10 | All |
| (United States) Team RPM | 7 | (United Kingdom) Nick Foster | GT3 | Porsche 997 GT3 Cup | Porsche 3.6L Flat-6 | All |
| (United States) Team RPM | 7 | (United Kingdom) Nigel Redwood | GT3 | Porsche 997 GT3 Cup | Porsche 3.6L Flat-6 | All |
| (United States) Team RPM | 8 | (Republic of Ireland) Matt Griffin | GT3 | Porsche 997 GT3 Cup | Porsche 3.6L Flat-6 | 1–2, 5–12 |
| (United States) Team RPM | 8 | (United Kingdom) Peter Bamford | GT3 | Porsche 997 GT3 Cup | Porsche 3.6L Flat-6 | 1–2, 5–12 |
| (United Kingdom) Tech 9 | 9 | (United Kingdom) Matt Harris | GT3 | Porsche 997 GT3 Cup | Porsche 3.6L Flat-6 | All |
| (United Kingdom) Tech 9 | 9 | (United Kingdom) Oliver Bryant | GT3 | Porsche 997 GT3 Cup | Porsche 3.6L Flat-6 | 1–7 |
| (United Kingdom) Tech 9 | 9 | (United Kingdom) Tom Ferrier | GT3 | Porsche 997 GT3 Cup | Porsche 3.6L Flat-6 | 8–14 |
| (United Kingdom) Damax | 10 | (United Kingdom) Phil Hopkins | GT3 | Ascari KZ1-R | BMW M62 5.0L V8 | 1–2 |
| (United Kingdom) Damax | 10 | (United Kingdom) Jimmy Brodie | GT3 | Ascari KZ1-R | BMW M62 5.0L V8 | 1–2 |
| (United Kingdom) Damax | 10 | (United Kingdom) Richard Stanton | GT3 | Ascari KZ1-R | BMW M62 5.0L V8 | 5 |
| (United Kingdom) Damax | 10 | (United Kingdom) Stephen Keating | GT3 | Ascari KZ1-R | BMW M62 5.0L V8 | 5–10, 13–14 |
| (United Kingdom) Damax | 10 | (Brazil) Thomas Erdos | GT3 | Ascari KZ1-R | BMW M62 5.0L V8 | 6–10, 13–14 |
| (United Kingdom) Damax | 11 | (Brazil) Thomas Erdos | GT3 | Ascari KZ1-R | BMW M62 5.0L V8 | 1–4 |
| (United Kingdom) Damax | 11 | (United Kingdom) Stephen Keating | GT3 | Ascari KZ1-R | BMW M62 5.0L V8 | 1–4 |
| (United Kingdom) Damax | 11 | (United Kingdom) Phil Keen | GT3 | Ascari KZ1-R | BMW M62 5.0L V8 | 8–10 |
| (United Kingdom) Damax | 11 | (United Kingdom) Oliver Bryant | GT3 | Ascari KZ1-R | BMW M62 5.0L V8 | 8–10 |
| (United Kingdom) VRS Motor Finance | 12 | (United Kingdom) Adam Wilcox | GT3 | Ferrari F430 GT3 | Ferrari 4.3L V8 | All |
| (United Kingdom) VRS Motor Finance | 12 | (United Kingdom) Phil Burton | GT3 | Ferrari F430 GT3 | Ferrari 4.3L V8 | All |
| (United Kingdom) Mackintosh/Plans Motorsport | 13 | (United Kingdom) Alistair MacKinnon | GT3 | Lotus Exige GT3 | Honda 1.8L I4 | 11–12 |
| (United Kingdom) Mackintosh/Plans Motorsport | 13 | (United Kingdom) George MacKintosh | GT3 | Lotus Exige GT3 | Honda 1.8L I4 | 11–12 |
| (United Kingdom) Trackspeed | 14 | (United Kingdom) David Ashburn | GT3 | Porsche 997 GT3 Cup | Porsche 3.6L Flat-6 | 1–4, 8, 11–12 |
| (United Kingdom) Trackspeed | 14 | (United Kingdom) Richard Williams | GT3 | Porsche 997 GT3 Cup | Porsche 3.6L Flat-6 | 1–2 |
| (United Kingdom) Trackspeed | 14 | (United Kingdom) Tim Sugden | GT3 | Porsche 997 GT3 Cup | Porsche 3.6L Flat-6 | 3–4 |
| (United Kingdom) Trackspeed | 14 | (United Kingdom) Jonny Lang | GT3 | Porsche 997 GT3 Cup | Porsche 3.6L Flat-6 | 8 |
| (United Kingdom) Trackspeed | 14 | (Republic of Ireland) Ronayne O'Mahony | GT3 | Porsche 997 GT3 Cup | Porsche 3.6L Flat-6 | 11–12 |
| (United Kingdom) Trackspeed | 15 | (United Kingdom) Gavan Kershaw | GT3 | Porsche 997 GT3 Cup | Porsche 3.6L Flat-6 | 1–2 |
| (United Kingdom) Trackspeed | 15 | (United Kingdom) Barrie Whight | GT3 | Porsche 997 GT3 Cup | Porsche 3.6L Flat-6 | 1–2 |
| (United Kingdom) Trackspeed | 15 | (United Kingdom) Pete James | GT3 | Porsche 997 GT3 Cup | Porsche 3.6L Flat-6 | 3–4 |
| (United Kingdom) Trackspeed | 15 | (United Kingdom) Iain Dockerill | GT3 | Porsche 997 GT3 Cup | Porsche 3.6L Flat-6 | 3–4 |
| (United Kingdom) Trackspeed | 60 | (United Kingdom) Phil Keen | GTC | Porsche 996 GT3 RS | Porsche 3.6L Flat-6 | 6–7 |
| (United Kingdom) Trackspeed | 60 | (United Kingdom) David Ashburn | GTC | Porsche 996 GT3 RS | Porsche 3.6L Flat-6 | 6–7 |
| (United Kingdom) Trackspeed | 64 | (United Kingdom) Phil Nuttal | GTC | Porsche 996 GT3 RS | Porsche 3.6L Flat-6 | 8 |
| (United Kingdom) Trackspeed | 64 | (United Kingdom) Andrew Shelley | GTC | Porsche 996 GT3 RS | Porsche 3.6L Flat-6 | 8 |
| (United Kingdom) RSS Performance | 16 | (United Kingdom) Pete Osborne | GT3 | Porsche 997 GT3 Cup | Porsche 3.6L Flat-6 | 9–10 |
| (United Kingdom) RSS Performance | 16 | (United Kingdom) Colin Wilmott | GT3 | Porsche 997 GT3 Cup | Porsche 3.6L Flat-6 | 9–10 |
| (United Kingdom) Moore Racing | 17 | (United Kingdom) Mike Gardiner | GT3 | Dodge Viper Competition Coupe | Dodge 8.3L V10 | 1–10 |
| (United Kingdom) Moore Racing | 17 | (United Kingdom) Paul Fenton | GT3 | Dodge Viper Competition Coupe | Dodge 8.3L V10 | 1–7, 9–10 |
| (United Kingdom) Moore Racing | 17 | (United Kingdom) Neil Cunningham | GT3 | Dodge Viper Competition Coupe | Dodge 8.3L V10 | 8 |
| (United Kingdom) Cadena Motorsport | 18 | (United Kingdom) Paul Whight | GT3 | Aston Martin DBRS9 | Aston Martin 6.0L V12 | 6–8 |
| (United Kingdom) Cadena Motorsport | 18 | (United Kingdom) Amanda Stretton | GT3 | Aston Martin DBRS9 | Aston Martin 6.0L V12 | 6–7 |
| (United Kingdom) Cadena Motorsport | 18 | (United Kingdom) Gavan Kershaw | GT3 | Aston Martin DBRS9 | Aston Martin 6.0L V12 | 8–14 |
| (United Kingdom) Cadena Motorsport | 18 | (United Kingdom) Barrie Whight | GT3 | Aston Martin DBRS9 | Aston Martin 6.0L V12 | 9–14 |
| (United Kingdom) Cadena Motorsport | 19 | (United Kingdom) Gavan Kershaw | GT3 | Lotus Exige GT3 | Honda 1.8L I4 | 3–4, 6–7 |
| (United Kingdom) Cadena Motorsport | 19 | (United Kingdom) Barrie Whight | GT3 | Lotus Exige GT3 | Honda 1.8L I4 | 3–4, 6–7 |
| (Hong Kong) Team Modena | 21 | (United Kingdom) Adam Jones | GT3 | Lamborghini Gallardo LP560 GT3 | Lamborghini 5.2L V10 | 5, 8–10, 13–14 |
| (Hong Kong) Team Modena | 21 | (United Kingdom) Rob Wilson | GT3 | Lamborghini Gallardo LP560 GT3 | Lamborghini 5.2L V10 | 5 |
| (Hong Kong) Team Modena | 21 | (Spain) Antonio García | GT3 | Lamborghini Gallardo LP560 GT3 | Lamborghini 5.2L V10 | 6–7 |
| (Hong Kong) Team Modena | 21 | (United Kingdom) Matthew Owen | GT3 | Lamborghini Gallardo LP560 GT3 | Lamborghini 5.2L V10 | 6–8 |
| (Hong Kong) Team Modena | 21 | (United Kingdom) Jason Templeman | GT3 | Lamborghini Gallardo LP560 GT3 | Lamborghini 5.2L V10 | 13–14 |
| (United Kingdom) Team Eurotech – Preci Spark | 22 | (United Kingdom) Godfrey Jones | GT3 | Ascari KZ1-R | BMW M62 5.0L V8 | All |
| (United Kingdom) Team Eurotech – Preci Spark | 22 | (United Kingdom) David Jones | GT3 | Ascari KZ1-R | BMW M62 5.0L V8 | All |
| (United Kingdom) Christians in Motorsport | 23 | (United Kingdom) Hector Lester | GT3 | Ferrari F430 GT3 | Ferrari 4.3L V8 | All |
| (United Kingdom) Christians in Motorsport | 23 | (United Kingdom) Tim Mullen | GT3 | Ferrari F430 GT3 | Ferrari 4.3L V8 | 1–4, 8 |
| (United Kingdom) Christians in Motorsport | 23 | (France) Stéphane Daoudi | GT3 | Ferrari F430 GT3 | Ferrari 4.3L V8 | 5 |
| (United Kingdom) Christians in Motorsport | 23 | (Denmark) Allan Simonsen | GT3 | Ferrari F430 GT3 | Ferrari 4.3L V8 | 6–7, 9–14 |
| (United Kingdom) Rollcentre Racing | 27 | (United Kingdom) Ian Flux | GT3 | Mosler MT900R | Chevrolet LS7 7.0L V8 | 3–4, 6–8 |
| (United Kingdom) Rollcentre Racing | 27 | (United Kingdom) Kevin Riley | GT3 | Mosler MT900R | Chevrolet LS7 7.0L V8 | 3–4, 6–8 |
| (Netherlands) Team Berlanga | 31 | (Netherlands) Eric Zwart | GT3 | Ascari KZ1-R | BMW M62 5.0L V8 | 8, 11–14 |
| (Netherlands) Team Berlanga | 31 | (United Kingdom) Michael Greensall | GT3 | Ascari KZ1-R | BMW M62 5.0L V8 | 8 |
| (Netherlands) Team Berlanga | 31 | (United Kingdom) Michael Greenhalgh | GT3 | Ascari KZ1-R | BMW M62 5.0L V8 | 11–14 |
| (Netherlands) Team Berlanga | 32 | (United Kingdom) Dan Gibson | GT3 | Ascari KZ1-R | BMW M62 5.0L V8 | 11–12 |
| (Netherlands) Team Berlanga | 32 | (United Kingdom) Paul Gibson | GT3 | Ascari KZ1-R | BMW M62 5.0L V8 | 11–12 |
| (United Kingdom) Brookspeed | 40 | (United Kingdom) Nigel Greensall | GT3 | Dodge Viper Competition Coupe | Dodge 8.3L V10 | 1–4, 6–8 |
| (United Kingdom) Brookspeed | 40 | (United Kingdom) Tony Littlejohn | GT3 | Dodge Viper Competition Coupe | Dodge 8.3L V10 | 1–2 |
| (United Kingdom) Brookspeed | 40 | (United Kingdom) Lawrence Tomlinson | GT3 | Dodge Viper Competition Coupe | Dodge 8.3L V10 | 3–4 |
| (United Kingdom) Brookspeed | 40 | (United Kingdom) Ricky Cole | GT3 | Dodge Viper Competition Coupe | Dodge 8.3L V10 | 6–8 |
| (United Kingdom) Brookspeed | 40 | (United Kingdom) Richard Stanton | GT3 | Dodge Viper Competition Coupe | Dodge 8.3L V10 | 9–10 |
| (United Kingdom) Brookspeed | 40 | (United Kingdom) Richard Hay | GT3 | Dodge Viper Competition Coupe | Dodge 8.3L V10 | 9–10 |
| (United Kingdom) Brookspeed | 40 | (India) Phiroze Bilimoria | GT3 | Dodge Viper Competition Coupe | Dodge 8.3L V10 | 11–12 |
| (United Kingdom) Brookspeed | 40 | (United Kingdom) Neil Cunningham | GT3 | Dodge Viper Competition Coupe | Dodge 8.3L V10 | 11–12 |
| (United Kingdom) Brookspeed | 40 | (United Kingdom) James Gornall | GT3 | Dodge Viper Competition Coupe | Dodge 8.3L V10 | 13–14 |
| (United Kingdom) Brookspeed | 40 | (Italy) Michelangelo Segatori | GT3 | Dodge Viper Competition Coupe | Dodge 8.3L V10 | 13–14 |
| (United Kingdom) Brookspeed | 41 | (United Kingdom) Clyve Richard | GT3 | Dodge Viper Competition Coupe | Dodge 8.3L V10 | 13–14 |
| (United Kingdom) Brookspeed | 41 | (United Kingdom) Glen Denny | GT3 | Dodge Viper Competition Coupe | Dodge 8.3L V10 | 13–14 |
| (United States) Multimatic Motorsport | 41 | (Belgium) Eric De Doncker | GT3 | Ford Mustang | Ford 4.0L V6 | 5 |
| (United States) Multimatic Motorsport | 41 | (United States) Gunnar Jeannette | GT3 | Ford Mustang | Ford 4.0L V6 | 5 |
| (United Kingdom) Eclipse | 44 | (United Kingdom) Craig Cole | GT3 | Mosler MT900R | Chevrolet LS7 7.0L V8 | 1–8 |
| (United Kingdom) Eclipse | 44 | (United Kingdom) Elliot Cole | GT3 | Mosler MT900R | Chevrolet LS7 7.0L V8 | 1–8 |
| (United Kingdom) Eclipse | 44 | (United Kingdom) Stuart Hall | GT3 | Mosler MT900R | Chevrolet LS7 7.0L V8 | 13–14 |
| (United Kingdom) Eclipse | 44 | (United Kingdom) Oliver Bryant | GT3 | Mosler MT900R | Chevrolet LS7 7.0L V8 | 13–14 |
| (United Kingdom) Apex Motorsport | 46 | (United Kingdom) Phil Keen | GT3 | Jaguar XKR | Jaguar 4.2L V8 | 13–14 |
| (United Kingdom) Apex Motorsport | 46 | (United Kingdom) Steven Kane | GT3 | Jaguar XKR | Jaguar 4.2L V8 | 13–14 |
| (United Kingdom) Apex Motorsport | 47 | (United Kingdom) Neil Cunningham | GT3 | Jaguar XKR | Jaguar 4.2L V8 | 13–14 |
| (United Kingdom) Apex Motorsport | 47 | (United Kingdom) Chris Ryan | GT3 | Jaguar XKR | Jaguar 4.2L V8 | 13–14 |
| (United Kingdom) Team Aero Racing | 50 | (United Kingdom) Steve Hyde | GTC | Morgan Aero 8GT | BMW N62 4.8L V8 | All |
| (United Kingdom) Team Aero Racing | 50 | (United Kingdom) Keith Ahlers | GTC | Morgan Aero 8GT | BMW N62 4.8L V8 | All |
| (United Kingdom) RSS Performance | 54 | (United Kingdom) Jamie Smyth | GTC | Porsche 996 GT3 RS | Porsche 3.6L Flat-6 | All |
| (United Kingdom) RSS Performance | 54 | (United Kingdom) Graeme Mundy | GTC | Porsche 996 GT3 RS | Porsche 3.6L Flat-6 | All |
| (United Kingdom) ABG Motorsport | 55 | (United Kingdom) Pete Morris | GTC | Porsche 996 GT3 RS | Porsche 3.6L Flat-6 | 6–7 |
| (United Kingdom) ABG Motorsport | 55 | (United Kingdom) Colin Broster | GTC | Porsche 996 GT3 RS | Porsche 3.6L Flat-6 | 6–7 |
| (United Kingdom) David Dove | 70 | (United Kingdom) David Dove | GTC | Ferrari 360 Modena | Ferrari 3.6L V8 | 1–2, 5–7 |
| (United Kingdom) David Dove | 70 | (United Kingdom) Jim Bickley | GTC | Ferrari 360 Modena | Ferrari 3.6L V8 | 5–7 |
| (United Kingdom) Maxspeed Engineering | 80 | (United Kingdom) Sean Crosswaite | Inv | Ginetta G320 GTR | Ford V6 | 1–2, 5 |
| (United Kingdom) Maxspeed Engineering | 80 | (United Kingdom) Chris Dawkins | Inv | Ginetta G320 GTR | Ford V6 | 1–2, 5 |
| (United Kingdom) Team Tiger | 81 | (United Kingdom) Jon Finnemore | GTC | Marcos Mantis | Marcos 4.6L V8 | 1–4 |
| (United Kingdom) Team Tiger | 81 | (United Kingdom) Chris Beighton | GTC | Marcos Mantis | Marcos 4.6L V8 | 1–4 |
| (United Kingdom) Richmond Racing | 88 | (United Kingdom) Nick Marsh | GTC | Ginetta G30 GTR | Ford V6 | 1–2, 5–14 |
| (United Kingdom) Richmond Racing | 88 | (United Kingdom) Richard Hollebon | GTC | Ginetta G30 GTR | Ford V6 | 1–2, 5–14 |
| (United Kingdom) Beechdean Motorsport | 99 | (United Kingdom) Aaron Scott | GTC | Ferrari 360 Modena | Ferrari 3.6L V8 | All |
| (United Kingdom) Beechdean Motorsport | 99 | (United Kingdom) Andrew Howard | GTC | Ferrari 360 Modena | Ferrari 3.6L V8 | All |

| Icon | Class |
|---|---|
| GT3 | GT3 Class |
| GTC | Cup Class |
| Inv | Invitation Class |

== Calendar ==
| Round | Circuit | Date | Length | Pole position | GT3 winner | GTC Winner |
|---|---|---|---|---|---|---|
| 1 | (United Kingdom) Oulton Park | 7 April | 60 mins | No. 1 Barwell Motorsport | No. 23 Christians in Motorsport | No. 81 Team Tiger |
| 1 | (United Kingdom) Oulton Park | 7 April | 60 mins | (United Kingdom) Jonny Cocker (United Kingdom) Paul Drayson | (United Kingdom) Hector Lester (United Kingdom) Tim Mullen | (United Kingdom) Chris Beighton (United Kingdom) Jon Finnemore |
| 2 | (United Kingdom) Oulton Park | 9 April | 60 mins | No. 23 Christians in Motorsport | No. 9 Tech 9 | No. 81 Team Tiger |
| 2 | (United Kingdom) Oulton Park | 9 April | 60 mins | (United Kingdom) Hector Lester (United Kingdom) Tim Mullen | (United Kingdom) Oliver Bryant (United Kingdom) Matt Harris | (United Kingdom) Chris Beighton (United Kingdom) Jon Finnemore |
| 3 | (United Kingdom) Donington Park | 21 April | 60 mins | No. 6 Team RPM | No. 3 Barwell Motorsport | No. 99 Beechdean Motorsport |
| 3 | (United Kingdom) Donington Park | 21 April | 60 mins | (United Kingdom) Bradley Ellis (United Kingdom) Alex Mortimer | (United Kingdom) Ben de Zille Butler (United Kingdom) Guy Harrington | (United Kingdom) Andrew Howard (United Kingdom) Aaron Scott |
| 4 | (United Kingdom) Donington Park | 22 April | 60 mins | No. 12 VRS Motor Finance | No. 2 Barwell Motorsport | No. 99 Beechdean Motorsport |
| 4 | (United Kingdom) Donington Park | 22 April | 60 mins | (United Kingdom) Phil Burton (United Kingdom) Adam Wilcox | (United Kingdom) Tom Alexander (United Kingdom) Michael Bentwood | (United Kingdom) Andrew Howard (United Kingdom) Aaron Scott |
| 5 | (United Kingdom) Snetterton | 3 June | 120 mins | No. 1 Barwell Motorsport | No. 1 Barwell Motorsport | No. 50 Team Aero Racing |
| 5 | (United Kingdom) Snetterton | 3 June | 120 mins | (United Kingdom) Jonny Cocker (United Kingdom) Paul Drayson | (United Kingdom) Jonny Cocker (United Kingdom) Paul Drayson | (United Kingdom) Keith Ahlers (United Kingdom) Steve Hyde |
| 6 | (United Kingdom) Brands Hatch | 14 July | 60 mins | No. 6 Team RPM | No. 6 Team RPM | No. 64 Trackspeed |
| 6 | (United Kingdom) Brands Hatch | 14 July | 60 mins | (United Kingdom) Bradley Ellis (United Kingdom) Alex Mortimer | (United Kingdom) Bradley Ellis (United Kingdom) Alex Mortimer | (United Kingdom) David Ashburn (United Kingdom) Phil Keen |
| 7 | (United Kingdom) Brands Hatch | 15 July | 60 mins | No. 23 Christians in Motorsport | No. 6 Team RPM | No. 55 ABG Motorsport |
| 7 | (United Kingdom) Brands Hatch | 15 July | 60 mins | (United Kingdom) Hector Lester (Denmark) Allan Simonsen | (United Kingdom) Bradley Ellis (United Kingdom) Alex Mortimer | (United Kingdom) Colin Broster (United Kingdom) Peter Morris |
| 8 | (United Kingdom) Silverstone | 12 August | 120 mins | No. 12 VRS Motor Finance | No. 23 Christians in Motorsport | No. 54 RSS Performance |
| 8 | (United Kingdom) Silverstone | 12 August | 120 mins | (United Kingdom) Phil Burton (United Kingdom) Adam Wilcox | (United Kingdom) Hector Lester (United Kingdom) Tim Mullen | (United Kingdom) Graeme Mundy (United Kingdom) Jamie Smyth |
| 9 | (United Kingdom) Thruxton | 25 August | 60 mins | No. 6 Team RPM | No. 1 Barwell Motorsport | No. 54 RSS Performance |
| 9 | (United Kingdom) Thruxton | 25 August | 60 mins | (United Kingdom) Bradley Ellis (United Kingdom) Alex Mortimer | (United Kingdom) Jonny Cocker (United Kingdom) Paul Drayson | (United Kingdom) Graeme Mundy (United Kingdom) Jamie Smyth |
| 10 | (United Kingdom) Thruxton | 26 August | 60 mins | No. 1 Barwell Motorsport | No. 3 Barwell Motorsport | No. 99 Beechdean Motorsport |
| 10 | (United Kingdom) Thruxton | 26 August | 60 mins | (United Kingdom) Jonny Cocker (United Kingdom) Paul Drayson | (United Kingdom) Ben de Zille Butler (United Kingdom) Guy Harrington | (United Kingdom) Andrew Howard (United Kingdom) Aaron Scott |
| 11 | (United Kingdom) Croft | 8 September | 60 mins | No. 22 Team Eurotech – Preci Spark | No. 23 Christians in Motorsport | No. 50 Team Aero Racing |
| 11 | (United Kingdom) Croft | 8 September | 60 mins | (United Kingdom) David Jones (United Kingdom) Godfrey Jones | (United Kingdom) Hector Lester (Denmark) Allan Simonsen | (United Kingdom) Keith Ahlers (United Kingdom) Steve Hyde |
| 12 | (United Kingdom) Croft | 9 September | 60 mins | No. 23 Christians in Motorsport | No. 23 Christians in Motorsport | No. 54 RSS Performance |
| 12 | (United Kingdom) Croft | 9 September | 60 mins | (United Kingdom) Hector Lester (Denmark) Allan Simonsen | (United Kingdom) Hector Lester (Denmark) Allan Simonsen | (United Kingdom) Graeme Mundy (United Kingdom) Jamie Smyth |
| 13 | (United Kingdom) Rockingham | 29 September | 60 mins | No. 21 Team Modena | No. 6 Team RPM | No. 99 Beechdean Motorsport |
| 13 | (United Kingdom) Rockingham | 29 September | 60 mins | (United Kingdom) Adam Jones (United Kingdom) Jason Templeman | (United Kingdom) Bradley Ellis (United Kingdom) Alex Mortimer | (United Kingdom) Andrew Howard (United Kingdom) Aaron Scott |
| 14 | (United Kingdom) Rockingham | 30 September | 60 mins | No. 23 Christians in Motorsport | No. 6 Team RPM | No. 99 Beechdean Motorsport |
| 14 | (United Kingdom) Rockingham | 30 September | 60 mins | (United Kingdom) Hector Lester (Denmark) Allan Simonsen | (United Kingdom) Bradley Ellis (United Kingdom) Alex Mortimer | (United Kingdom) Andrew Howard (United Kingdom) Aaron Scott |

== Championship standings ==
- Competitors must have completed 70% of the race distance covered by the class winner to be classified.
- Points were awarded as follows:

| 1 | 2 | 3 | 4 | 5 | 6 | 7 | 8 |
|---|---|---|---|---|---|---|---|
| 10 | 8 | 6 | 5 | 4 | 3 | 2 | 1 |
Half points were awarded if a class had less than 6 cars

=== Drivers' Championships ===
==== GT3 ====
| Pos | Driver | OUL (United Kingdom) | | DON (United Kingdom) | | SNE (United Kingdom) | BRH (United Kingdom) | | SIL (United Kingdom) | THR (United Kingdom) | | CRO (United Kingdom) | | ROC (United Kingdom) | | Pts |
|---|---|---|---|---|---|---|---|---|---|---|---|---|---|---|---|---|
| 1 | (United Kingdom) Bradley Ellis | 9 | 3 | 2 | 5 | 10 | 1 | 1 | 6 | 2 | 3 | 4 | 15† | 1 | 1 | 81 |
| 1 | (United Kingdom) Alex Mortimer | 9 | 3 | 2 | 5 | 10 | 1 | 1 | 6 | 2 | 3 | 4 | 15† | 1 | 1 | 81 |
| 2 | (United Kingdom) Jonathan Cocker | 7 | 2 | 3 | 2 | 1 | 19 | Ret | 3 | 1 | 2 | 5 | 3 | 4 | 7 | 75 |
| 2 | (United Kingdom) Paul Drayson | 7 | 2 | 3 | 2 | 1 | 19 | Ret | 3 | 1 | 2 | 5 | 3 | 4 | 7 | 75 |
| 3 | (United Kingdom) Ben De Zille Butler | 5 | 4 | 1 | 3 | 3 | DNS | 3 | Ret | 3 | 1 | 2 | 2 | 12 | 9 | 69 |
| 3 | (United Kingdom) Guy Harrington | 5 | 4 | 1 | 3 | 3 | DNS | 3 | Ret | 3 | 1 | 2 | 2 | 12 | 9 | 69 |
| 4 | (Republic of Ireland) Hector Lester | 1 | 7 | | | Ret | 3 | 2 | 1 | 5 | 10 | 1 | 1 | 11 | 3 | 66 |
| 5 | (United Kingdom) Godfrey Jones | 3 | 6 | 5 | 4 | 2 | 6 | 4 | 4 | 7 | 6 | 3 | 5 | DNS | 6 | 58 |
| 5 | (United Kingdom) David Jones | 3 | 6 | 5 | 4 | 2 | 6 | 4 | 4 | 7 | 6 | 3 | 5 | DNS | 6 | 58 |
| 6 | (Denmark) Allan Simonsen | | | | | | 3 | 2 | | 5 | 10 | 1 | 1 | 11 | 3 | 44 |
| 7 | (United Kingdom) Matt Harris | 4 | 1 | 7 | 9 | Ret | 20† | 7 | 5 | DNS | 20† | 8 | 6 | 2 | 4 | 42 |
| 8 | (United Kingdom) Tom Alexander | 2 | 8 | 6 | 1 | 5 | 2 | 5 | 9 | 10 | 7 | 9 | 14† | Ret | 12 | 41 |
| 8 | (United Kingdom) Michael Bentwood | 2 | 8 | 6 | 1 | 5 | 2 | 5 | 9 | 10 | 7 | 9 | 14† | Ret | 12 | 41 |
| 9 | (United Kingdom) Adam Wilcox | 6 | 12 | 14 | 6 | Ret | DNS | 6 | 2 | 8 | 12 | 19† | 8 | 7 | 5 | 28 |
| 9 | (United Kingdom) Phil Burton | 6 | 12 | 14 | 6 | Ret | DNS | 6 | 2 | 8 | 12 | 19† | 8 | 7 | 5 | 28 |
| 10 | (United Kingdom) Tom Ferrier | | | | | | | | 5 | DNS | 20† | 8 | 6 | 2 | 4 | 23 |
| 11 | (United Kingdom) Tim Mullen | 1 | 7 | | | | | | 1 | | | | | | | 22 |
| 12 | (United Kingdom) Nigel Redwood | 10 | 17 | 9 | 11 | Ret | 7 | 10 | 22 | 4 | 9 | 7 | Ret | 5 | 2 | 22 |
| 12 | (United Kingdom) Nick Foster | 10 | 17 | 9 | 11 | Ret | 7 | 10 | 22 | 4 | 9 | 7 | Ret | 5 | 2 | 22 |
| 13 | (United Kingdom) Oliver Bryant | 4 | 1 | 7 | 9 | Ret | 20† | 7 | 7 | 9 | Ret | | | 21† | DNS | 21 |
| 14 | (United Kingdom) Adam Jones | | | | | 4 | | | 8 | Ret | DNS | | | 3 | DNS | 12 |
| 15 | (United Kingdom) Ian Flux | | | 4 | 8 | | 5 | 12 | 14 | | | | | | | 10 |
| 15 | (United Kingdom) Kevin Riley | | | 4 | 8 | | 5 | 12 | 14 | | | | | | | 10 |
| 16 | (United Kingdom) Barrie Whight | | | | | | DNS | 16 | | 6 | 4 | 11 | 16† | 8 | 10 | 10 |
| 17 | (United Kingdom) Gavan Kershaw | 12 | 19 | | | | DNS | 16 | 21 | | 4 | 11 | 16† | 8 | 10 | 7 |
| 18 | (United Kingdom) Jason Templeman | | | | | | | | | | | | | 3 | DNS | 6 |
| 19 | (United Kingdom) Craig Cole | 11 | Ret | 16 | Ret | Ret | 4 | 9 | 19 | | | | | | | 5 |
| 19 | (United Kingdom) Elliot Cole | 11 | Ret | 16 | Ret | Ret | 4 | 9 | 19 | | | | | | | 5 |
| 20 | (United Kingdom) Rob Wilson | | | | | 4 | | | | | | | | | | 5 |
| 21 | (United Kingdom) Henry Fletcher | Ret | DNS | Ret | 12 | 13† | 10 | Ret | 11 | 18 | 5 | | | 9 | Ret | 5 |
| 22 | (United Kingdom) David Ashburn | 14 | 5 | Ret | Ret | | | | Ret | | | 14 | 10 | | | 5 |
| 23 | (United Kingdom) Richard Williams | 14 | 5 | | | | | | | | | | | | | 4 |
| 24 | (United Kingdom) Tim Harvey | | | | | | | | | 18 | 5 | | | | | 4 |
| 25 | (United Kingdom) Stephen Keating | 21† | Ret | 10† | 7 | Ret | 13 | 8 | Ret | Ret | 16 | | | 14 | 8 | 4 |
| 25 | (Brazil) Thomas Erdos | 21† | Ret | 10† | 7 | | 13 | 8 | Ret | Ret | 16 | | | 14 | 8 | 4 |
| 26 | (United Kingdom) Paul Fenton | Ret | 11 | | | 6 | 16 | 13 | | 12 | 13 | | | | | 3 |
| 26 | (United Kingdom) Mike Gardiner | Ret | 11 | | | 6 | 16 | 13 | 17 | 12 | 13 | | | | | 3 |
| 27 | (United Kingdom) Paul Whight | 12 | 19 | | | | Ret | DNS | 21 | 6 | | | | | | 3 |
| 28 | (United Kingdom) Phil Keen | | | | | | | | 7 | 9 | Ret | | | 17 | Ret | 2 |
| 29 | (Belgium) Eric De Doncker | | | | | 7 | | | | | | | | | | 2 |
| 29 | (United States) Gunnar Jeannette | | | | | 7 | | | | | | | | | | 2 |
| 30 | (United Kingdom) Peter Bamford | 8 | 15 | | | Ret | 9 | Ret | 12 | 13 | 11 | 13 | 11 | 13 | 11 | 1 |
| 30 | (United Kingdom) Matt Griffin | 8 | 15 | | | Ret | 9 | Ret | 12 | 13 | 11 | 13 | 11 | 13 | 11 | 1 |
| 31 | (United Kingdom) Fergus Campbell | 13 | 13 | 11 | 10 | Ret | 8 | Ret | 10 | 11 | 14 | 16 | Ret | Ret | 14 | 1 |
| 32 | (United Kingdom) Mark Cole | 13 | 13 | 11 | 10 | | 8 | Ret | 10 | 11 | 14 | | | | | 1 |
| 33 | (United Kingdom) Nigel Greensall | 18 | 9 | 8 | Ret | | 11 | 11 | 13 | | | | | | | 1 |
| 34 | (United Kingdom) Lawrence Tomlinson | | | 8 | Ret | | | | | | | | | | | 1 |
| 35 | (United Kingdom) Matt Owen | | | | | | Ret | 19 | 8 | | | | | | | 1 |
| 36 | (United Kingdom) Steve Clark | | | | | | | | | | | 6 | 4 | 9 | Ret | 1 |
| 37 | (United Kingdom) Richard Hay | | | | | | | | | 17 | 8 | | 9 | | | 0 |
| 38 | (United Kingdom) Neil Cunningham | | | | | | | | 17 | | | 12 | 9 | 20 | 15 | 0 |
| 39 | (United Kingdom) Tony Littlejohn | 18 | 9 | | | | | | | | | | | | | 0 |
| 40 | (United Kingdom) James Saggers | Ret | DNS | Ret | 12 | 13† | 10 | Ret | | | | | | | | 0 |
| 41 | (United Kingdom) Ronayne O'Mahony | | | | | | | | | | | 14 | 10 | | | 0 |
| 42 | (Italy) Michelangelo Segatori | | | | | | | | | | | | | 10 | 16 | 0 |
| 42 | (United Kingdom) James Gornall | | | | | | | | | | | | | 10 | 16 | 0 |
| 43 | (United Kingdom) Ricky Cole | | | | | | 11 | 11 | | | | | | | | 0 |
| 44 | (United Kingdom) Nick Padmore | | | | | | | | 11 | | | | | | | 0 |
| 45 | (India) Phiroze Bilimoria | | | | | | | | 13 | | | | | | | 0 |
| 46 | (United Kingdom) Clyve Richard | | | | | | | | | | | | | 15 | 13 | 0 |
| 46 | (United Kingdom) Glen Denny | | | | | | | | | | | | | 15 | 13 | 0 |
| 47 | (United Kingdom) George MacKintosh | | | | | | | | | 15 | 17 | 18 | DNS | Ret | 14 | 0 |
| 48 | (United Kingdom) Pete James | | | 15 | 16 | | | | | | | | | | | 0 |
| 48 | (United Kingdom) Iain Dockerill | | | 15 | 16 | | | | | | | | | | | 0 |
| 49 | (United Kingdom) Alistair Mackinnon | | | | | | | | | 15 | 17 | 18 | DNS | | | 0 |
| 50 | (United Kingdom) Colin Wilmott | | | | | | | | | Ret | 15 | | | | | 0 |
| 50 | (United Kingdom) Pete Osborne | | | | | | | | | Ret | 15 | | | | | 0 |
| 51 | (United Kingdom) Chris Ryan | | | | | | | | | | | | | 20 | 15 | 0 |
| 52 | (United Kingdom) Simon Blanckley | | | | | | | | | | | 16 | Ret | | | 0 |
| 53 | (United Kingdom) Richard Stanton | | | | | Ret | | | | 17 | | | | | | 0 |
| 54 | (United Kingdom) Steven Kane | | | | | | | | | | | | | 17 | Ret | 0 |
| 55 | (Spain) Antonio García | | | | | | Ret | 19 | | | | | | | | 0 |
| 56 | (United Kingdom) Stuart Hall | | | | | | | | | | | | | 21† | DNS | 0 |
| | (United Kingdom) Phil Hopkins | Ret | Ret | | | | | | | | | | | | | 0 |
| | (United Kingdom) Jimmy Brodie | Ret | Ret | | | | | | | | | | | | | 0 |
| | (United Kingdom) Tim Sugden | | | Ret | Ret | | | | | | | | | | | 0 |
| | (France) Stéphane Daoudi | | | | | Ret | | | | | | | | | | 0 |
| | (United Kingdom) Lee Atkins | | | | | Ret | | | | | | | | | | 0 |
| | (United Kingdom) Amanda Stretton | | | | | | Ret | DNS | | | | | | | | 0 |
| | (United Kingdom) Jonny Lang | | | | | | | | Ret | | | | | | | 0 |
Guest drivers ineligible for points
| – | (United Kingdom) Paul O'Neill | | | | | | | | | | | 6 | 4 | | | 0 |
| – | (Netherlands) Eric Zwart | | | | | | | | NC | | | 10 | Ret | 6 | Ret | 0 |
| – | (United Kingdom) Michael Greenhalgh | | | | | | | | NC | | | 10 | Ret | 6 | Ret | 0 |
| – | (United Kingdom) Paul Gibson | | | | | | | | | | | Ret | 7 | | | 0 |
| – | (United Kingdom) Dan Gibson | | | | | | | | | | | Ret | 7 | | | 0 |
| – | (United Kingdom) James Littlejohn | | | | | | | | | | 8 | | | | | 0 |
| Pos | Driver | OUL (United Kingdom) | | DON (United Kingdom) | | SNE (United Kingdom) | BRH (United Kingdom) | | SIL (United Kingdom) | THR (United Kingdom) | | CRO (United Kingdom) | | ROC (United Kingdom) | | Pts |

| Colour | Result |
|---|---|
| Gold | Winner |
| Silver | Second place |
| Bronze | Third place |
| Green | Points classification |
| Blue | Non-points classification |
| Blue | Non-classified finish (NC) |
| Purple | Retired, not classified (Ret) |
| Red | Did not qualify (DNQ) |
| Red | Did not pre-qualify (DNPQ) |
| Black | Disqualified (DSQ) |
| White | Did not start (DNS) |
| White | Withdrew (WD) |
| White | Race cancelled (C) |
| Blank | Did not practice (DNP) |
| Blank | Did not arrive (DNA) |
| Blank | Excluded (EX) |

† — Drivers did not finish the race, but were classified as they completed over 90% of the race distance.

==== GTC ====
| Pos | Driver | OUL (United Kingdom) | | DON (United Kingdom) | | SNE (United Kingdom) | BRH (United Kingdom) | | SIL (United Kingdom) | THR (United Kingdom) | | CRO (United Kingdom) | | ROC (United Kingdom) | | Pts |
|---|---|---|---|---|---|---|---|---|---|---|---|---|---|---|---|---|
| 1 | (United Kingdom) Jamie Smyth | 16 | 16 | Ret | 14 | 9 | 14 | 17 | 15 | 14 | 21 | 17 | 12 | 18 | DNS | 96 |
| 1 | (United Kingdom) Graeme Mundy | 16 | 16 | Ret | 14 | 9 | 14 | 17 | 15 | 14 | 21 | 17 | 12 | 18 | DNS | 96 |
| 2 | (United Kingdom) Andrew Howard | 20 | 18 | 12 | 13 | | Ret | 15 | 18 | 16 | 18 | NC | 13 | 16 | 17 | 88 |
| 2 | (United Kingdom) Aaron Scott | 20 | 18 | 12 | 13 | | Ret | 15 | 18 | 16 | 18 | NC | 13 | 16 | 17 | 88 |
| 3 | (United Kingdom) Steve Hyde | 17 | 14 | 13 | 15 | 8 | Ret | DNS | 20 | | | 15 | Ret | 19 | 19 | 53 |
| 3 | (United Kingdom) Keith Ahlers | 17 | 14 | 13 | 15 | 8 | Ret | DNS | 20 | | | 15 | Ret | 19 | 19 | 53 |
| 4 | (United Kingdom) Nick Marsh | 19 | DNS | | | 12† | 18 | 20 | Ret | Ret | 19 | Ret | Ret | Ret | 18 | 34 |
| 4 | (United Kingdom) Richard Hollebon | 19 | DNS | | | 12† | 18 | 20 | Ret | Ret | 19 | Ret | Ret | Ret | 18 | 34 |
| 5 | (United Kingdom) Chris Beighton | 15 | 10 | | | | | | | | | | | | | 20 |
| 5 | (United Kingdom) John Finnemore | 15 | 10 | | | | | | | | | | | | | 20 |
| 6 | (United Kingdom) Peter Morris | | | | | | 15 | 14 | | | | | | | | 16 |
| 6 | (United Kingdom) Colin Broster | | | | | | 15 | 14 | | | | | | | | 16 |
| 7 | (United Kingdom) David Dove | Ret | Ret | | | 11 | 17 | 18 | | | | | | | | 16 |
| 7 | (United Kingdom) Jim Bickley | | | | | 11 | 17 | 18 | | | | | | | | 16 |
| 8 | (United Kingdom) Phil Keen | | | | | | 12 | Ret | | | | | | | | 10 |
| 8 | (United Kingdom) David Ashburn | | | | | | 12 | Ret | | | | | | | | 10 |
| 9 | (United Kingdom) Andrew Shelley | | | | | | | | 16 | | | | | | | 8 |
| 9 | (United Kingdom) Phil Nuttall | | | | | | | | 16 | | | | | | | 8 |
Guest drivers ineligible for points
| | (United Kingdom) Sean Crosswaite | | | | | DNS | | | | | | | | | | 0 |
| | (United Kingdom) Chris Dawkins | | | | | DNS | | | | | | | | | | 0 |
| Pos | Driver | OUL (United Kingdom) | | DON (United Kingdom) | | SNE (United Kingdom) | BRH (United Kingdom) | | SIL (United Kingdom) | THR (United Kingdom) | | CRO (United Kingdom) | | ROC (United Kingdom) | | Pts |

| Colour | Result |
|---|---|
| Gold | Winner |
| Silver | Second place |
| Bronze | Third place |
| Green | Points classification |
| Blue | Non-points classification |
| Blue | Non-classified finish (NC) |
| Purple | Retired, not classified (Ret) |
| Red | Did not qualify (DNQ) |
| Red | Did not pre-qualify (DNPQ) |
| Black | Disqualified (DSQ) |
| White | Did not start (DNS) |
| White | Withdrew (WD) |
| White | Race cancelled (C) |
| Blank | Did not practice (DNP) |
| Blank | Did not arrive (DNA) |
| Blank | Excluded (EX) |

=== Teams' Championships ===
==== GT3 ====
| Position | Team | Points |
|---|---|---|
| 1 | Barwell Motorsport | 109 |
| 2 | Team RPM | 86 |
| 3 | Christians in Motorsport | 66 |
| 4 | Team Eurotech – Preci Spark | 57 |
| 5 | Tech 9 | 40 |
| 6 | VRS Motor Finance | 27 |
| 7 | Team Modena | 12 |
| 8 | Cadena Motorsport | 10 |
| 8 | Rollcentre Racing | 10 |
| 10 | DAMAX | 6 |
| 11 | Eclipse | 5 |
| 12 | Trackspeed | 4 |
| 13 | Team Berlanga | 3 |
| 13 | Moore Racing | 3 |
| 13 | Team Trimite Brookspeed | 3 |
| 16 | Multimatic Motorsport | 2 |
| 17 | Team 4Car with confused.com | 1 |
