= Formula RUS =

Russian formula racing class

- Category: Single seaters
- Country: Russia
- Inaugural season: 2002
- Folded: 2007
- Constructors: AKKC Motorsport
- Last Drivers' champion: (Russia) Maxim Travin
- Last Teams' champion: (Russia) mail.ru Team
- Official website: formularus.ru

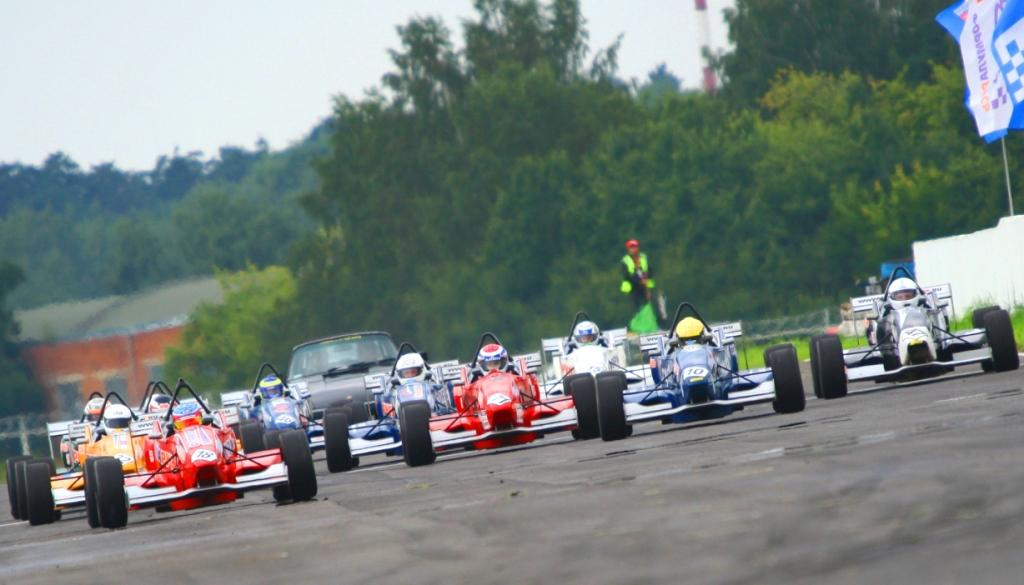
Formula RUS cars on the grid

Formula RUS (Формула Русь) was a Russian formula racing class, corresponding to FIA's Formula Е category. The class was designed to help beginners and young karters make the transition to auto racing. The series ran from 2002 to 2007.

== Formula RUS Championship ==
The Formula RUS Championship is a single-make Formula RUS series. Teams and drivers are restricted from making any changes to the car. The series organizers provide technical service to series participants and guarantee that all cars are identical, including car setup.

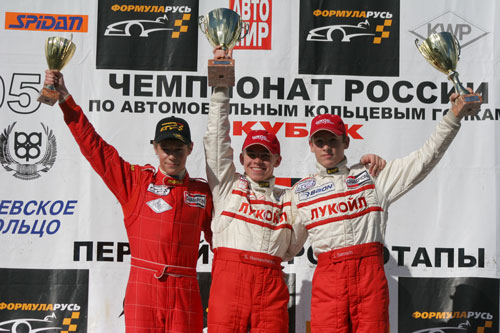
Formula RUS podium

The aim of Formula RUS is to provide a practical and realistic platform for the novice racing driver, with an emphasis on the provision of education and development of race craft.

In 1999 (and for the first time in Russian motor racing history), the concept of a mono-class, low budget, racing car first came about, and as a direct result of this concept and idea, the first batch of cars were produced. The car was designed so that it could be used for training drivers with very little racing experience and also for the purpose of taking part in official competitions.

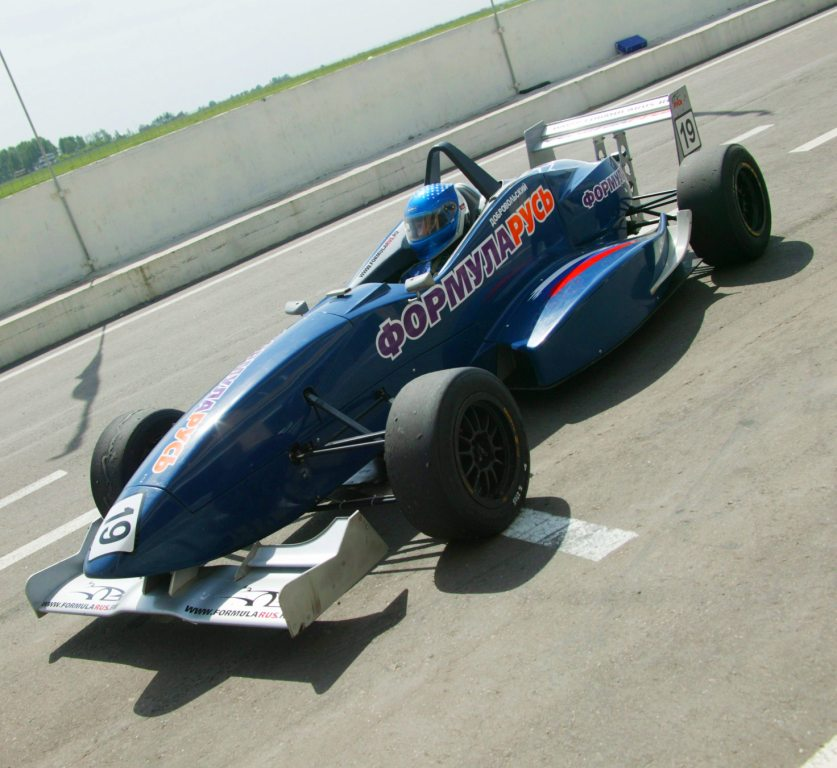
Formula RUS car

Since 2002 and after having undergone a full and thorough testing programme Formula RUS now has over seventy cars in operation– over thirty of which are in operation at any one time. Additionally, since 2002, Formula RUS has carried out the «Formula RUS Championship», which in 2003 was granted the status of the Championship of Russia.

During the five years of its existence, the formula has taken part in more than seventy races and carried out more than one hundred and seventy testing days. The series has also trained over two hundred and sixty racing drivers of ages ranging from sixteen to sixty – all of them with various degrees of racing skills and abilities and from the many various regions of the Russian Federation and the CIS.

Many Russian racing drivers owe the start of their careers in motorsport to Formula RUS.

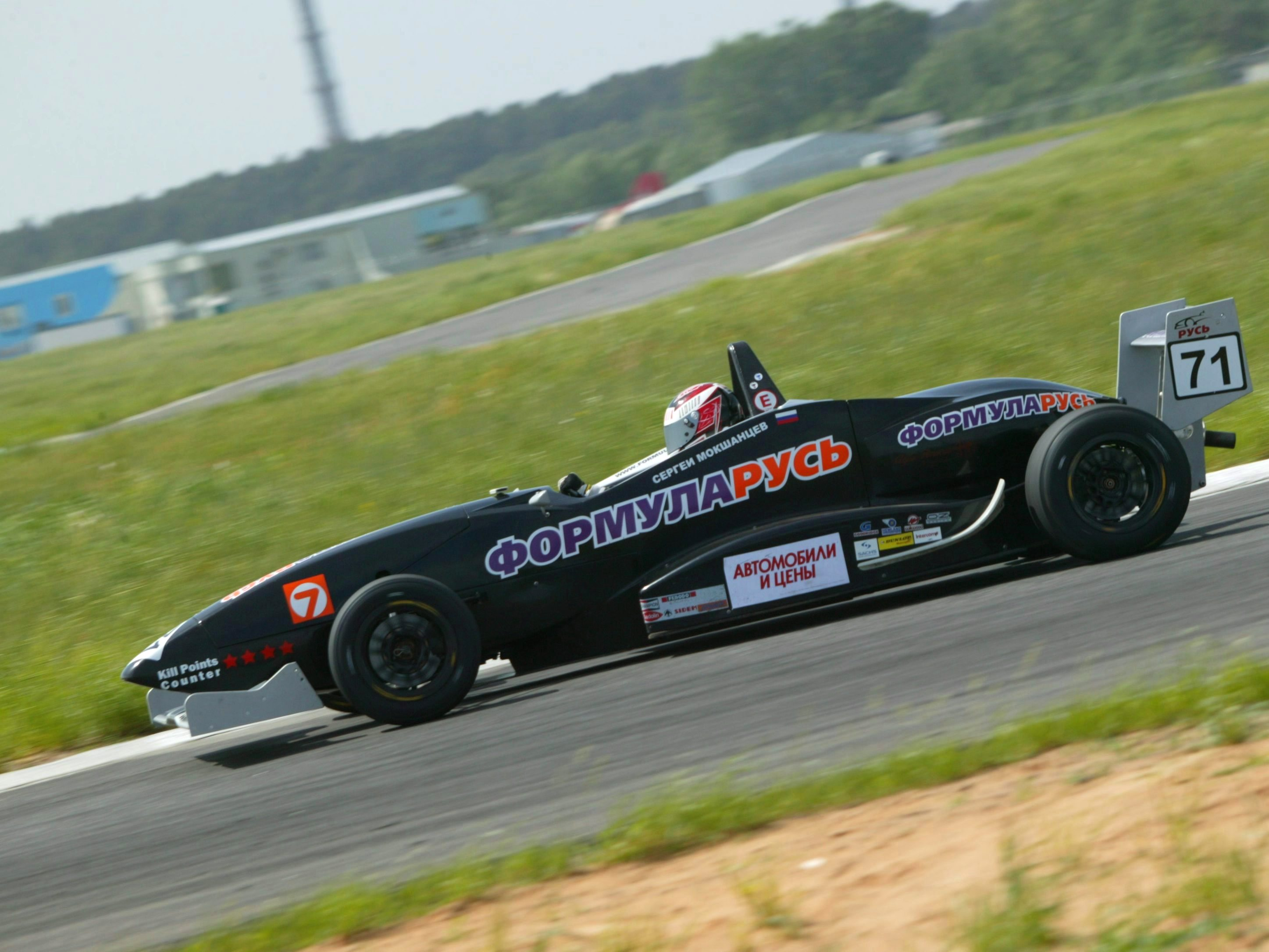
Formula RUS car on track

== Technical specification ==
- Formula Rus racing car, model FR 02/2 has been developed and is being manufactured by “AKKC Motorsport”, a structural division of “Rash’n’Race”. AKKC Motorsport is the manufacturer of components and spare parts.

== Champions ==
All teams and drivers were Russian-registered.

Season	Champion	Team Champion
2002	Roman Shestakov	RUZKOM Motorsport
2003	Yuri Baiborodov	Lukoil-Serebryaniy dojd'-junior
2004	Sergey Afanasyev	Lukoil Racing Team Junior
2005	Sergey Romaschenko	Lukoil Racing Team Junior
2006	Kirill Ovcharenko	OK Racing Team
2007	Maxim Travin	mail.ru Team

== Video ==
- OPEN FOR ITSELF Formula RUS
- Formula RUS
- Formula RUS 2006
