= 2007 Mini Challenge UK =

Motor racing competition

Seasons
- ← 2006 2008 →

The 2007 Mini Challenge season was the sixth season of the Mini Challenge UK. The season started on 28 April at Snetterton Motor Racing Circuit and ended on 7 October at Brands Hatch. The season featured seven rounds across the UK and one in Belgium.

== Calendar ==
=== Race calendar ===
All meetings ran the Cooper and Cooper S classes. Oulton Park ran on the Saturday and Monday of the weekend.

Round		Circuit	Date
1	R1	Snetterton Motor Racing Circuit	28–29 April
1	R2	Snetterton Motor Racing Circuit	28–29 April
1	R3	Snetterton Motor Racing Circuit	28–29 April
2	R4	Oulton Park	26, 28 May
2	R5	Oulton Park	26, 28 May
3	R6	Circuit de Spa-Francorchamps	16–17 June
3	R7	Circuit de Spa-Francorchamps	16–17 June
4	R8	Thruxton Circuit	21–22 July
4	R9	Thruxton Circuit	21–22 July
5	R10	Donington Park	4–5 August
5	R11	Donington Park	4–5 August
6	R12	Croft Circuit	25–26 August
6	R13	Croft Circuit	25–26 August
7	R14	Pembrey Circuit	22–23 September
7	R15	Pembrey Circuit	22–23 September
7	R16	Pembrey Circuit	22–23 September
8	R17	Brands Hatch	6–7 October
8	R18	Brands Hatch	6–7 October

== Entry list ==
Team	No.	Driver	Rounds
Cooper S Class
Forster Motorsport	2	(United Kingdom) Peter Budd	1–4
Forster Motorsport	2	(United Kingdom) Arthur Forster	8
Forster Motorsport	7	(United Kingdom) Arthur Forster	3–5
Forster Motorsport	16	(United Kingdom) Nathan Coulter	1–3, 6–8
Forster Motorsport	30	(United Kingdom) Martin Depper	1, 3–8
Maximum Motorsport	4	(United Kingdom) Stewart Lines	All
Coastal Racing	6	(United Kingdom) Jake Packun	All
Coastal Racing	11	(United Kingdom) Lee Pattison	All
Coastal Racing	15	(United Kingdom) Carl Bradley	4
Coastal Racing	15	(United Kingdom) Steve Wood	7
Coastal Racing	95	(United Kingdom) Steve Wood	8
Coastal Racing	17	(United Kingdom) Alex Ferguson	1–3
Coastal Racing	17	(United Kingdom) Stephen Tyldsley	4–8
Mini Motorsport	8	(Spain) Pedro del Campo	All
Mini Motorsport	14	(United Kingdom) Shaun King	1, 3–5, 8
Privateer	9	(United Kingdom) Michael Jones	1–5, 7–8
Privateer	40	(United Kingdom) Matt Campbell	2–5
Privateer	40	(United Kingdom) Darelle Wilson	7–8
Privateer	66	(United Kingdom) Steve Liquorish	6
Stanford Racing	12	(United Kingdom) Jack Stanford	All
Malvern Motorsport	19	(United Kingdom) Andy Beever	All
Advent Motorsport	24	(United Kingdom) James Blyth	All
Advent Motorsport	44	(United Kingdom) Allen Jackson	1–5, 8
OX4 Racing	51	(United Kingdom) Gavin Bristow	All
Tynecastle Racing	69	(United Kingdom) Garry Meikle	All
Tynecastle Racing	70	(United Kingdom) Oly Mortimer	All
Redline Racing	77	(United Kingdom) Jason Greatrex	All
Cooper Class
Nixon Motorsport	1	(United Kingdom) Gareth Nixon	1, 5
Nixon Motorsport	3	(United Kingdom) Stephen Mitchell	6
Nixon Motorsport	10	(United Kingdom) Michelle Nixon	All
Nixon Motorsport	74	(United Kingdom) Gary Kounnis	All
Mark Fish Motorsport	13	(United Kingdom) Nik Rochez	1–5, 7–8
Mark Fish Motorsport	21	(United Kingdom) Jenny Ryan	1–7
Mark Fish Motorsport	22	(United Kingdom) Jenny Ryan	8
Mark Fish Motorsport	29	(United Kingdom) Andrew Cox	1, 3–6, 8
Mark Fish Motorsport	29	(United Kingdom) Simon Fish	7
Mark Fish Motorsport	31	(United Kingdom) Keith Issatt	2–7
Mark Fish Motorsport	99	(United Kingdom) Ian Mills	1
Advent Motorsport	18	(United Kingdom) Sarah Parsons	All
Advent Motorsport	20	(United Kingdom) Graham Parsons	All
Advent Motorsport	22	(United Kingdom) Katie Percy	1, 5
Advent Motorsport	23	(United Kingdom) Amanda Johnson	1–3
Advent Motorsport	23	(United Kingdom) Alex MacDowall	4
Advent Motorsport	27	(United Kingdom) Nick Jones	All
Advent Motorsport	42	(United Kingdom) Dawn Boyd	All
Waddington Motorsport	25	(United Kingdom) Laura Waddington	All
Waddington Motorsport	35	(United Kingdom) Josh Waddington	All
Privateer	33	(United Kingdom) John Bates	All
Coastal Racing	95	(United Kingdom) Andrew Langdell	1–6

== Championship standings ==
Scoring system

Championship points were awarded for the first 15 positions in each Championship Race. Entries were required to complete 75% of the winning car's race distance in order to be classified and earn points. There were bonus points awarded for Pole Position and Fastest Lap.

Championship Race points

Position	1st	2nd	3rd	4th	5th	6th	7th	8th	9th	10th	11th	12th	13th	14th	15th
Points	20	17	15	13	11	10	9	8	7	6	5	4	3	2	1

=== Drivers' Championship ===
==== Cooper S Class ====
Pos	Driver	SNE			OUL		SPA		THR		DON		CRO		PEM			BHI		Pts
1	(United Kingdom) Oly Mortimer	1	1	1	1	1	1	4	7	11	2	3	2	1	11	8	6	6	7	268
2	(United Kingdom) Jason Greatrex	11	12	Ret	2	5	Ret	8	2	2	7	5	3	6	1	1	3	3	10	201
3	(United Kingdom) Martin Depper	14	15	Ret			2	Ret	8	1	12	8	1	3	2	3	7	2	1	175
4	(United Kingdom) Gavin Bristow	9	7	Ret	14	9	3	Ret	1	13	1	1	16	5	3	2	13	10	4	171
5	(United Kingdom) Andy Beever	10	9	7	7	Ret	4	Ret	11	7	4	6	4	8	6	4	2	8	9	157
6	(United Kingdom) Nathan Coulter	7	4	4	6	11	Ret	DNS					5	2	5	7	1	1	3	155
7	(United Kingdom) Lee Pattison	2	3	2	4	7	Ret	2	5	Ret	6	Ret	11	Ret	9	11	11	5	5	155
8	(United Kingdom) James Blyth	5	5	3	10	4	7	1	3	10	DSQ	11	10	Ret	13	12	9	9	8	149
9	(United Kingdom) Jack Stanford	4	13	10	9	Ret	6	5	9	5	Ret	4	7	4	4	9	5	Ret	16	135
10	(United Kingdom) Garry Meikle	3	2	Ret	5	2	Ret	9	Ret	6	5	9	8	10	14	14	8	Ret	DNS	120
11	(United Kingdom) Stewart Lines	12	18	Ret	16	8	8	6	17	4	13	10	6	7	8	Ret	4	7	6	110
12	(United Kingdom) Jake Packun	8	14	6	13	6	12	13	15	Ret	3	2	12	13	12	Ret	Ret	Ret	13	88
13	(United Kingdom) Allen Jackson	13	8	5	DNS	DNS	5	3	18	9	10	14						12	12	71
14	(United Kingdom) Shaun King	6	6	9			9	11	10	3	Ret	Ret						11	11	70
15	(United Kingdom) Peter Budd	Ret	16	Ret	3	3	10	7	13	8	9	Ret								63
16	(United Kingdom) Stephen Tyldsley								14	14	8	7	13	9	10	5	10	13	Ret	57
17	(United Kingdom) Darelle Wilson														8	6	14	4	2	51
18	(Spain) Pedro del Campo	15	10	8	11	12	14	15	16	Ret	11	12	14	11	15	13	15	Ret	14	51
19	(United Kingdom) Alex Ferguson	Ret	11	Ret	8	10	11	10												30
20	(United Kingdom) Matt Campbell				12	13	13	12	12	Ret	12	13								24
21	(United Kingdom) Michael Jones	16	17	11	15	Ret	15	14	19	12	15	15			17	15	16	14	15	19
22	(United Kingdom) Arthur Forster								6	DSQ	Ret	DNS	9	Ret				Ret	DNS	17
23	(United Kingdom) Carl Bradley								4	DSQ										13
24	(United Kingdom) Steve Wood														16	10	12	Ret	Ret	10
25	(United Kingdom) Steve Liquorish												15	12						5

==== Cooper Class ====
Pos	Driver	SNE			OUL		SPA		THR		DON		CRO		PEM			BHI		Pts
1	(United Kingdom) Jenny Ryan	3	3	4	1	2	9	Ret	3	5	4	1	1	1	2	3	2	3	3	273
2	(United Kingdom) Gary Kounnis	2	4	3	2	1	3	3	6	2	1	3	3	12	5	1	Ret	2	2	260
3	(United Kingdom) Nick Jones	1	1	2	4	6	2	Ret	5	13	5	7	10	5	1	2	1	1	1	251
4	(United Kingdom) Graham Parsons	4	2	1	13	Ret	5	1	2	4	2	4	Ret	2	4	4	Ret	4	Ret	204
5	(United Kingdom) Keith Issatt				Ret	3	1	2	4	3	3	2	2	4	3	6	3			184
6	(United Kingdom) Michelle Nixon	5	5	DNS	10	11	6	5	9	9	7	4	5	6	8	10	5	9	9	150
7	(United Kingdom) Nik Rochez	7	9	7	3	7	4	4	14	6	10	6			10	11	DNS	12	6	128
8	(United Kingdom) John Bates	6	12	6	6	5	7	7	7	8	8	8	Ret	10	7	Ret	8	8	Ret	127
9	(United Kingdom) Dawn Boyd	10	11	10	5	8	11	8	12	10	12	10	8	Ret	9	9	7	6	4	123
10	(United Kingdom) Sarah Parsons	13	13	9	7	10	12	10	8	Ret	13	12	9	8	11	12	9	7	7	102
11	(United Kingdom) Andrew Langdell	9	8	5	11	4	8	6	11	Ret	6	9	7	9						100
12	(United Kingdom) Josh Waddington	15	15	13	9	12	13	11	13	11	11	13	6	Ret	13	7	6	10	8	86
13	(United Kingdom) Andrew Cox	12	6	Ret					10	7	9	11	11	7				5	5	77
14	(United Kingdom) Laura Waddington	16	16	14	12	13	14	12	15	12	14	14	12	11	12	8	10	11	10	62
15	(United Kingdom) Amanda Johnson	8	7	8	8	9	10	9												53
16	(United Kingdom) Alex MacDowall								1	1										41
17	(United Kingdom) Stephen Mitchell												4	3						28
18	(United Kingdom) Simon Fish														6	5	DNS			21
19	(United Kingdom) Ian Mills	11	10	12																15
20	(United Kingdom) Katie Percy	14	14	11							15	DNS								10
21	(United Kingdom) Gareth Nixon	Ret	Ret	DNS							DNS	DNS								1
