= 2006 Mini Challenge UK =

Motor racing competition

Seasons
- ← 2005 2007 →

The 2006 Mini Challenge UK season was the fifth season of the Mini Challenge UK. The season started on 1 April at Snetterton Motor Racing Circuit and ended on 22 October at Donington Park. The season featured seven rounds across the UK and one in Belgium.

Freddy Nordström won the Cooper S class.

== Calendar ==
=== Race calendar ===
All 8 race meetings held both Cooper and Cooper S classes.

Round		Circuit	Date
1	R1	Snetterton Motor Racing Circuit	1–2 April
1	R2	Snetterton Motor Racing Circuit	1–2 April
2	R3	Brands Hatch	29–30 April
2	R4	Brands Hatch	29–30 April
3	R5	Pembrey Circuit	27–28 May
3	R6	Pembrey Circuit	27–28 May
4	R7	Castle Combe	24–25 June
4	R8	Castle Combe	24–25 June
5	R9	Thruxton Circuit	5–6 August
5	R10	Thruxton Circuit	5–6 August
6	R11	Croft Circuit	9–10 September
6	R12	Croft Circuit	9–10 September
7	R13	Circuit de Spa-Francorchamps	7–8 October
7	R14	Circuit de Spa-Francorchamps	7–8 October
8	R15	Donington Park	21–22 October
8	R16	Donington Park	21–22 October

== Entry list ==
Team	No.	Driver	Rounds
Cooper S Class
Forster Motorsport	1	(United Kingdom) Arthur Forster	All
Forster Motorsport	7	(United Kingdom) Carl Baker	1, 6
Forster Motorsport	7	(United Kingdom) Tony Skelton	2
Forster Motorsport	7	(United Kingdom) Terry Birtchford	8
Forster Motorsport	16	(United Kingdom) Nathan Coulter	2, 4–8
Forster Motorsport	30	(United Kingdom) Martin Depper	All
Privateer	2	(United Kingdom) Charles Bloom	1–3, 5–8
Privateer	15	(United Kingdom) Alex Ferguson	5–7
Privateer	22	(United Kingdom) David Shepherd	All
Privateer	55	(United Kingdom) Bill Philp	1–3, 7
Privateer	66	(United Kingdom) Ant Scragg	7
Privateer	69	(Republic of Ireland) Ciaran Butler	7
Privateer	69	(United States) Wayne Hunsucker	8
Privateer	9	(United Kingdom) Michael Jones	1–5, 7–8
Coastal Racing	4	(United Kingdom) Carl Bradley	All
Coastal Racing	6	(United Kingdom) Jake Packun	8
Coastal Racing	12	(United Kingdom) Jack Stanford	8
Mark Fish Motorsport	5	(United Kingdom) Andrew Bailey	All
Mark Fish Motorsport	52	(United Kingdom) Angus Duke	1
Mark Fish Motorsport	52	(United Kingdom) Fiona Leggate	5, 7
BMR Motorsport	8	(United Kingdom) Finlay Crocker	All
Advent Motorsport	15	(United Kingdom) Mark Drury	4, 7
Advent Motorsport	15	(United Kingdom) Stewart Lines	8
Advent Motorsport	44	(Sweden) Freddy Nordström	All
Advent Motorsport	77	(United Kingdom) Allen Jackson	All
OX4 Racing	51	(United Kingdom) Gavin Bristow	All
Cooper Class
Nixon Motorsport	3	(United Kingdom) Gareth Nixon	All
Nixon Motorsport	24	(United Kingdom) Rob Austin	All
Nixon Motorsport	36	(United Kingdom) Eric Bailey	All
Mark Fish Motorsport	13	(United Kingdom) Ian Mills	1, 8
Mark Fish Motorsport	13	(United Kingdom) Nik Rochez	2–5, 7
Mark Fish Motorsport	23	(United Kingdom) Jenny Ryan	All
Mark Fish Motorsport	29	(United Kingdom) Andrew Cox	1–2, 4–6
Advent Motorsport	15	(United Kingdom) Mark Drury	1–3
Advent Motorsport	20	(United Kingdom) Graham Parsons	1–5, 7–8
Advent Motorsport	42	(United Kingdom) Dawn Boyd	6–8
Advent Motorsport	98	(United Kingdom) Amanda Elliot	5–8
Advent Motorsport	99	(United Kingdom) Tim Crighton	1, 4–8
Advent Motorsport	99	(United Kingdom) Ray MacDowall	2
Privateer	21	(United Kingdom) Jonathan Shepherd	All
Privateer	40	(United Kingdom) Edward Lovett	All
Privateer	50	(United Kingdom) Rachel Owen	1–3, 7–8
BMR Motorsport	26	(United Kingdom) James Olden	3–5, 7
BMR Motorsport	26	(United Kingdom) Gary Robertshaw	8
BMR Motorsport	26	(United Kingdom) Dave Phillips	1–2
BMR Motorsport	32	(United Kingdom) Dave Phillips	6
BMR Motorsport	32	(United Kingdom) Alan Taylor	1–5, 7–8
BMR Motorsport	31	(United Kingdom) Keith Issatt	All
Forster Motorsport	33	(United Kingdom) John Bates	1–4, 6–8
Forster Motorsport	47	(United Kingdom) Gary Kounnis	All

== Championship standings ==
Scoring system

Championship points were awarded for the first 15 positions in each Championship Race. Entries were required to complete 75% of the winning car's race distance in order to be classified and earn points. There were bonus points awarded for Pole Position and Fastest Lap.

Championship Race points

Position	1st	2nd	3rd	4th	5th	6th	7th	8th	9th	10th	11th	12th	13th	14th	15th
Points	20	17	15	13	11	10	9	8	7	6	5	4	3	2	1

=== Drivers' Championship ===
==== Cooper S Class ====
Pos	Driver	SNE		BHI		CAS		PEM		THR		CRO		SPA		DON		Pts
1	(Sweden) Freddy Nordström	7	2	2	3	3	1	2	1	4	2	3	3	1	2	3	3	265
2	(United Kingdom) Arthur Forster	3	4	Ret	1	1	2	1	DSQ	2	1	1	Ret	Ret	1	9	1	219
3	(United Kingdom) Martin Depper	5	5	4	2	2	4	6	3	1	4	4	2	2	Ret	5	11	203
4	(United Kingdom) Carl Bradley	1	1	11	6	7	6	8	2	3	3	5	1	Ret	Ret	2	Ret	178
5	(United Kingdom) Finlay Crocker	4	7	5	8	8	7	4	9	9	7	11	6	8	14	4	5	143
6	(United Kingdom) David Shepherd	11	3	12	Ret	5	5	3	4	5	6	2	Ret	4	13	Ret	6	139
7	(United Kingdom) Gavin Bristow	8	8	6	7	9	Ret	5	5	7	5	6	5	Ret	5	8	4	137
8	(United Kingdom) Andrew Bailey	9	9	3	4	6	3	7	7	8	DNS	8	DNS	3	4	Ret	DNS	129
9	(United Kingdom) Allen Jackson	6	Ret	1	5	4	12	9	Ret	10	8	12	Ret	7	9	6	7	119
10	(United Kingdom) Michael Jones	13	10	9	11	Ret	11	11	10	13	10			13	8	12	10	67
11	(United Kingdom) Nathan Coulter			Ret	Ret			Ret	8	12	9	10	4	15	Ret	7	12	53
12	(United Kingdom) Bill Philp	10	Ret	8	9	10	8							11	7			49
13	(United Kingdom) Charles Bloom	12	11	10	Ret	11	10			Ret	DNS	13	8	14	11	14	Ret	46
14	(United Kingdom) Alex Ferguson									11	Ret	7	7	9	3			45
15	(United Kingdom) Jack Stanford															1	2	38
16	(United Kingdom) Carl Baker	2	6									9	Ret					34
17	(United Kingdom) Mark Drury							10	6					12	10			33
18	(United Kingdom) Fiona Leggate									6	Ret			5	Ret			22
19	(Republic of Ireland) Ciaran Butler													6	6			20
20	(United Kingdom) Tony Skelton			7	10													15
21	(United States) Wayne Hunsucker															10	8	14
22	(United Kingdom) Stewart Lines															11	9	12
23	(United Kingdom) Ant Scragg													10	12			10
24	(United Kingdom) Jake Packun															13	Ret	3
25	(United Kingdom) Angus Duke	Ret	DNS															0
26	(United Kingdom) Terry Birtchford															Ret	Ret	0

==== Cooper Class ====
Pos	Driver	SNE		BHI		CAS		PEM		THR		CRO		SPA		DON		Pts
1	(United Kingdom) Gareth Nixon	3	1	1	2	4	1	1	1	1	1	1	1	1	1	1	1	314
2	(United Kingdom) Eric Bailey	1	2	Ret	4	6	2	4	5	4	5	6	6	2	2	7	5	203
3	(United Kingdom) Gary Kounnis	2	4	9	6	1	5	7	10	5	4	DSQ	10	Ret	5	6	6	154
4	(United Kingdom) Jenny Ryan	5	8	11	8	Ret	4	5	3	3	Ret	4	3	5	7	5	10	153
5	(United Kingdom) Edward Lovett	4	5	7	13	Ret	9	6	6	6	11	5	5	4	Ret	2	3	146
6	(United Kingdom) Jonathan Shepherd	11	7	2	Ret	2	6	2	4	10	9	3	Ret	11	8	9	7	145
7	(United Kingdom) Tim Crighton	Ret	3					Ret	2	2	2	2	2	6	4	Ret	2	142
8	(United Kingdom) Rob Austin	Ret	Ret	3	5	3	8	3	7	8	8	8	7	7	Ret	10	11	128
9	(United Kingdom) Graham Parsons	7	6	6	3	9	3	Ret	8	11	7			15	3	4	8	125
10	(United Kingdom) Keith Issatt	8	9	12	10	Ret	11	9	Ret	7	Ret	11	4	3	6	8	12	101
11	(United Kingdom) Alan Taylor	9	12	15	11	7	Ret	10	12	9	6			8	9	11	9	80
12	(United Kingdom) Rachel Owen	10	10	10	12	5	10							9	10	14	Ret	54
13	(United Kingdom) Dave Phillips	6	11	5	7							7	8					52
14	(United Kingdom) James Olden					Ret	7	8	9	Ret	3			DSQ	DSQ			40
15	(United Kingdom) Andrew Cox	12	13	13	Ret			12	11	13	12	9	9					40
16	(United Kingdom) John Bates	13	15	16	15	8	13	13	Ret			12	12	14	12	13	14	38
17	(United Kingdom) Ray MacDowall			4	1													35
18	(United Kingdom) Nik Rochez			14	14	Ret	12	11	Ret	12	10			10	11			34
19	(United Kingdom) Amanda Elliot									14	13	10	11	12	14	12	13	29
20	(United Kingdom) Gary Robertshaw															3	4	28
21	(United Kingdom) Mark Drury	15	14	8	9	Ret	DNS											18
22	(United Kingdom) Dawn Boyd											13	13	13	13	16	15	13
23	(United Kingdom) Ian Mills	14	Ret													15	Ret	3
