= 2011 Mini Challenge UK =

Motor racing competition

Seasons
- ← 2010 2012 →

The 2011 Mini Challenge season was the tenth season of the Mini Challenge UK. The season started on 16 April at Silverstone Circuit and ended on 16 October at Snetterton Motor Racing Circuit. The season featured seven rounds across the UK.

== Calendar ==
=== Race calendar ===
All 7 meetings were held with both the JCW and Cooper classes.

Round		Circuit	Date
1	R1	Silverstone Circuit	16–17 April
1	R2	Silverstone Circuit	16–17 April
2	R3	Oulton Park	14 May
2	R4	Oulton Park	14 May
3	R5	Brands Hatch GP	4–5 June
3	R6	Brands Hatch GP	4–5 June
3	R7	Brands Hatch GP	4–5 June
4	R8	Brands Hatch Indy	16–17 July
4	R9	Brands Hatch Indy	16–17 July
4	R10	Brands Hatch Indy	16–17 July
5	R11	Donington Park	13–14 August
5	R12	Donington Park	13–14 August
5	R13	Donington Park	13–14 August
6	R14	Anglesey Circuit	10–11 September
6	R15	Anglesey Circuit	10–11 September
6	R16	Anglesey Circuit	10–11 September
6	R17	Anglesey Circuit	10–11 September
7	R18	Snetterton Motor Racing Circuit	15–16 October
7	R19	Snetterton Motor Racing Circuit	15–16 October
7	R20	Snetterton Motor Racing Circuit	15–16 October

== Entry list ==
Team	No.	Driver	Rounds
JCW Class
Truck Align	1	(United Kingdom) Lee Allen	All
Truck Align	3	(United Kingdom) Craig Freeman	5–7
Truck Align	7	(United Kingdom) Craig Freeman	1–2
Truck Align	26	(United Kingdom) George Allen	3–7
Forster Motorsport	3	(United Kingdom) Arthur Forster	1–4
Forster Motorsport	30	(United Kingdom) Martin Depper	1–4
Maximum Solutions	4	(United Kingdom) Stewart Lines	All
IN:MINI	5	(United Kingdom) Andrew Bailey	All
Excelr8 Motorsport	6	(United Kingdom) Luke Caudle	All
Excelr8 Motorsport	9	(United Kingdom) Kevin O'Connor	All
Excelr8 Motorsport	77	(United Kingdom) Chris Knox	All
Minimax	8	(United Kingdom) Finlay Crocker	All
Coastal Racing	10	(United Kingdom) Chris Smith	1–5, 7
Coastal Racing	29	(United Kingdom) Chris Panayiotou	1–5
Coastal Racing	52	(United Kingdom) Rhys Lloyd	6–7
Coastal Racing	57	(United Kingdom) Lee Pattison	7
Mark Fish Motorsport	18	(United Kingdom) Sam Osborne	All
Mark Fish Motorsport	45	(United Kingdom) David Ogden	1–5, 7
Mark Fish Motorsport	50	(United Kingdom) Jason Richardson	1–5, 7
OX4 Racing	35	(United Kingdom) James Loukes	1
OX4 Racing	35	(United Kingdom) Chris Oakman	3
OX4 Racing	51	(United Kingdom) Chris Oakman	5–6
OX4 Racing	51	(United Kingdom) Gavin Bristow	4
OX4 Racing	57	(United Kingdom) Gavin Bristow	6
RPM Racing	68	(United Kingdom) Lee Sullivan	All
CSK Motorsport	89	(United Kingdom) Shane Stoney	7
Cooper Class
Powerstart	2	(United Kingdom) Dean Raymond	All
Excelr8 Motorsport	11	(United Kingdom) Roger Bates	4
Excelr8 Motorsport	12	(United Kingdom) Justina Williams	5–7
Excelr8 Motorsport	19	(United Kingdom) Sarah Parsons	1–5
Excelr8 Motorsport	21	(United Kingdom) Daniel Bishop	7
Excelr8 Motorsport	31	(United Kingdom) Keith Issatt	5
Excelr8 Motorsport	41	(United Kingdom) Robert Ladbrook	4
Excelr8 Motorsport	44	(United Kingdom) Ben Gridley	1–4
Excelr8 Motorsport	54	(United Kingdom) Ant Whorton-Eales	All
Mark Fish Motorsport	11	(United Kingdom) Michelle Nixon	7
Lohen	12	(Russia) Andrey Magiy	1
Lohen	14	(Russia) Andrey Magiy	7
Advent Motorsport	15	(United Kingdom) Patrick Mortimer	All

== Championship standings ==
Scoring system

Championship points were awarded for the first 15 positions in each Championship Race. Entries were required to complete 75% of the winning car's race distance in order to be classified and earn points. There were bonus points awarded for Pole Position and Fastest Lap.

Championship Race points

Position	1st	2nd	3rd	4th	5th	6th	7th	8th	9th	10th	11th	12th	13th	14th	15th
Points	20	17	15	13	11	10	9	8	7	6	5	4	3	2	1

=== Drivers' Championship ===
==== JCW Class ====
Pos	Driver	SIL		OUL		BHGP			BHI			DON			ANG				SNE			Pts
1	(United Kingdom) Chris Knox	3	14	9	13	1	1	1	C	4	2	3	1	1	1	1	2	4	1	2	3	301
2	(United Kingdom) Lee Allen	6	2	6	1	2	4	4	C	1	1	4	2	Ret	8	3	7	3	4	1	Ret	252
3	(United Kingdom) Luke Caudle	2	7	1	14	3	2	2	C	2	4	1	DSQ	3	2	2	1	1	10	Ret	DNS	248
4	(United Kingdom) Sam Osborne	5	3	11	7	8	5	5	C	8	5	5	3	2	3	Ret	5	2	2	6	2	221
5	(United Kingdom) Chris Smith	7	DNS	2	2	4	3	3	C	Ret	DNS	15	7	5					7	5	1	146
6	(United Kingdom) Jason Richardson	1	1	4	5	5	6	11	C	3	9	6	Ret	Ret					3	Ret	DNS	142
7	(United Kingdom) Stewart Lines	16	6	3	3	13	DNS	DNS	C	DNS	7	2	Ret	7	DNS	6	11	5	8	4	11	130
8	(United Kingdom) Andrew Bailey	13	10	8	12	11	10	12	C	DNS	12	8	4	4	5	4	3	12	11	9	8	126
9	(United Kingdom) Finlay Crocker	10	11	16	8	10	9	8	C	DNS	8	9	10	Ret	Ret	Ret	10	7	5	3	4	115
10	(United Kingdom) Lee Sullivan	12	8	10	15	9	14	DNS	C	Ret	Ret	10	6	6	7	7	12	8	12	7	6	107
11	(United Kingdom) Chris Panayiotou	9	9	7	4	6	7	7	C	5	3	16	Ret	DNS								91
12	(United Kingdom) Kevin O'Connor	11	15	14	Ret	12	8	6	C	Ret	11	12	Ret	8	DNS	10	4	10	13	Ret	7	84
13	(United Kingdom) David Ogden	14	Ret	13	11	14	12	14	C	7	10	13	8	9					9	8	9	73
14	(United Kingdom) George Allen					15	13	13	C	6	6	14	Ret	11	6	8	9	9	15	Ret	Ret	67
15	(United Kingdom) Martin Depper	4	4	5	9	7	Ret	9	C	DNS	DNS											60
16	(United Kingdom) Craig Freeman	15	13	15	10				C			11	9	10	9	11	8	13	14	DNS	DNS	56
17	(United Kingdom) Rhys Lloyd								C						4	5	Ret	6	Ret	11	10	46
18	(United Kingdom) Chris Oakman					Ret	11	10	C			7	5	Ret	DNS	DNS	6	11				46
19	(United Kingdom) Arthur Forster	8	5	12	6	Ret	Ret	DNS	C	Ret	DNS											33
20	(United Kingdom) Shane Stoney								C										6	10	5	27
21	(United Kingdom) Gavin Bristow								C	Ret	DSQ				Ret	9	DNS	DNS				7
22	(United Kingdom) James Loukes	Ret	12						C													4
23	(United Kingdom) Lee Pattison								C										Ret	Ret	Ret	0

==== Cooper Class ====
Pos	Driver	SIL		OUL		BHGP			BHI			DON			ANG				SNE			Pts
1	(United Kingdom) Ant Whorton-Eales	1	1	1	Ret	1	1	1	C	1	1	1	1	1	1	1	3	1	2	1	1	373
2	(United Kingdom) Dean Raymond	2	2	2	1	3	Ret	4	C	2	3	2	3	2	2	2	2	Ret	Ret	Ret	Ret	234
3	(United Kingdom) Patrick Mortimer	5	6	4	2	Ret	Ret	Ret	C	3	2	5	2	3	3	4	1	2	4	5	6	227
4	(United Kingdom) Sarah Parsons	3	3	3	3	Ret	3	2	C	4	4	3	DSQ	DSQ								133
5	(United Kingdom) Justina Williams								C			4	Ret	4	4	3	4	3	Ret	Ret	5	106
6	(United Kingdom) Ben Gridley	4	4	Ret	Ret	2	2	3	C	Ret	DNS											75
7	(United Kingdom) Michelle Nixon								C										1	2	2	55
8	(Russia) Andrey Magiy	Ret	5						C										5	4	4	48
9	(United Kingdom) Daniel Bishop								C										3	3	3	45
10	(United Kingdom) Robert Ladbrook								C	Ret	5											11
11	(United Kingdom) Roger Bates								C	Ret	Ret											0
12	(United Kingdom) Keith Issatt								C			Ret	Ret	DNS								0
