= Forster Motorsport =

(United Kingdom) Forster Motorsport
- Founded: 2002
- Team principal(s): Arthur Forster; Martin Depper
- Current series: MINI Challenge
- Former series: MINI Challenge; British Touring Car Championship
- Drivers' Championships: 2005 MINI Challenge (Forster); 2008 MINI Challenge (Depper)

Forster Motorsport are a racing team, based in Wallsend, United Kingdom. They are primarily known for racing Minis in the UK MINI Challenge, and being successful in their endeavours. They also competed in the 2010 BTCC season in a pair of BMW 320si racing cars.

== MINI Challenge ==
The team was formed in 2002 to allow Arthur Forster to race in the UK MINI Challenge. His previous experience racing Ford Fiestas in the 1994 Ford Fiesta Challenge stood him in good stead and he was instantly challenging for race wins, and indeed took a few top place finishes in his maiden season. In 2004, Arthur finished the season on level points, but missed out on the title on countback. He rectified this by becoming the Challenge Champion in 2005.

Also during the 2005 season Martin Depper joined the team, initially competing in the Cooper Class, and moving up to the Club Class the following season (in which he finished third in class).

After a tough 2007 season, in which Arthur had moved to take a team manager role, Martin emulated Arthur's success during 2008 and took the Challenge Championship. Arthur's return to the race seat in the 2008 season was not as successful with some expensive repair bills and broken bones being his reward. However, with both having tasted success in the MINI Challenge, the team began to look at other race series, and Martin, being a (in his own words) "let's take a big step" person, made the suggestion of the BTCC. Knowing that such a big leap would require time to prepare for, the team continued competing in the MINI challenge for their 8th consecutive season whilst preparing for the BTCC in the background.

== Move to BTCC ==
In October 2009 Forster Motorsport announced their intentions to join the next season of the British Touring Car Championship, a statement they reiterated on their own website in January 2010.

The team entered two BMW 320si race cars, the cars having previously been campaigned by Mat Jackson. Martin raced in car number 30, whilst Arthur took car number 37. Both had been upgraded to that season's specification for the BMW touring cars. The cars debuted at the BTCC's 2010 Media Day at Brands Hatch, however only one car was able to compete at their first round of the 2010 season at Rockingham Circuit. The team had decided that their pre-season preparations had only been "satisfactory" and so postponed their start to the season until Round 2 at Rockingham to allow further time for testing and preparation. However, despite both cars being ready, only Arthur was able to compete as Martin became stranded in the US due to the travel disruption caused by the volcanic ash cloud over Europe. Arthur had a successful weekend at Rockingham, finishing all three races.

However, as the season progressed the team quickly became back markers during the races. Neither driver scored any championship points, and as a result the team also finished on 0 points, one of three teams to finish in such a position (the other two being Central Racing Group and AmD Milltek Racing.com).

Martin's record for the series was nine rounds not attended (Thruxton, Rockingham, and Knockhill), three Did Not Starts (all at Donnington), six retirements, a 12th place, a 13th place, four 14th places, three 15th places, a 16th place, and a 20th place.

Arthur's record for the series was two rounds not attended (Thruxton and Knockhill), four retirements, one Not Classified, two 13th places, two 14th places, three 15th places, four 16th places, four 17th places, one 18th place, one 19th place, and two 20th places.

== Return to the MINI Challenge ==
After a disappointing season in the BTCC, and having made comments that they would be competing in the 2011 BTCC season, Forster reappeared in the MINI Challenge.

Both drivers are competing in the JCW Class, Martin in car number 30 and Arthur in car number 3. By the end of round 9 of the series the team had suffered a number of Did Not Start (DNS) and Did Not Finish (DNF) results for both drivers. This meant that approaching the half way mark in the season Martin was sat in 11th position on 60 points and Arthur in 20th position with 33 points. However, neither driver had appeared at rounds 8 or 9.
