= 2012 Mini Challenge UK =

Motor racing competition

Seasons
- ← 2011 2013 →

The 2012 Mini Challenge UK season was the eleventh season of the Mini Challenge UK. The season started on 14 April at Silverstone Circuit and ended on 7 October at Donington Park. The season featured seven rounds across the UK.

== Calendar ==
=== Race calendar ===
All meetings ran the JCW and Cooper classes.

Round		Circuit	Date
1	R1	Silverstone Circuit	14–15 April
1	R2	Silverstone Circuit	14–15 April
2	R3	Castle Combe Circuit	7 May
2	R4	Castle Combe Circuit	7 May
3	R5	Brands Hatch Indy	16–17 June
3	R6	Brands Hatch Indy	16–17 June
3	R7	Brands Hatch Indy	16–17 June
4	R8	Snetterton Motor Racing Circuit	30 June-1 July
4	R9	Snetterton Motor Racing Circuit	30 June-1 July
4	R10	Snetterton Motor Racing Circuit	30 June-1 July
4	R11	Snetterton Motor Racing Circuit	30 June-1 July
5	R12	Oulton Park	18 July
5	R13	Oulton Park	18 July
6	R14	Brands Hatch GP	15–16 September
6	R15	Brands Hatch GP	15–16 September
6	R16	Brands Hatch GP	15–16 September
7	R17	Donington Park	6–7 October
7	R18	Donington Park	6–7 October
7	R19	Donington Park	6–7 October
7	R20	Donington Park	6–7 October

== Entry list ==
Team	No.	Driver	Rounds
JCW Class
Mark Fish Motorsport	1	(United Kingdom) Chris Knox	2
Mark Fish Motorsport	77	(United Kingdom) Chris Knox	1
Mark Fish Motorsport	50	(United Kingdom) Jason Richardson	1–2, 6–7
Forster Motorsport	3	(United Kingdom) Arthur Forster	2–3
Forster Motorsport	37	(United Kingdom) Arthur Forster	5, 7
Coastal Racing	5	(United Kingdom) Lee Pattison	2–7
Coastal Racing	7	(United Kingdom) Craig Freeman	2–5, 7
Coastal Racing	30	(United Kingdom) Martin Depper	1–5
Coastal Racing	4	(United Kingdom) Stewart Lines	1–5
Excelr8 Motorsport	4	(United Kingdom) Stewart Lines	7
Excelr8 Motorsport	10	(United Kingdom) Chris Smith	All
Excelr8 Motorsport	18	(United Kingdom) Sam Osborne	All
Excelr8 Motorsport	58	(United Kingdom) Paul O'Neill	6
Advent Motorsport	15	(United Kingdom) Patrick Mortimer	All
Advent Motorsport	44	(Sweden) Freddy Nordström	3
Stratford Motors	16	(United Kingdom) William Davison	3–6
Stratford Motors	46	(United Kingdom) Shaun King	6–7
Minimax Motorsport	22	(United Kingdom) Chris Smiley	All
Truck Align	26	(United Kingdom) Lee Allen	All
Truck Align	29	(United Kingdom) Chris Panayiotou	1–3, 5, 7
Lohen	45	(United Kingdom) David Ogden	7
Lohen	54	(United Kingdom) Ant Whorton-Eales	4
Lohen	99	(United Kingdom) Kevin O'Connor	All
Jack Doyle Racing	70	(United Kingdom) Bob Hosier	All
CSK Motorsport	89	(United Kingdom) Shane Stoney	1–6
Cooper Class
Team Dean	2	(United Kingdom) Dean Raymond	1–2
Advent Motorsport	8	(United Kingdom) Adrian Norman	All
Advent Motorsport	51	(United Kingdom) Martin Mortimer	7
Excelr8 Motorsport	11	(United Kingdom) Trevor Bates	3
Excelr8 Motorsport	17	(United Kingdom) Simon Hillery	1–3
Excelr8 Motorsport	79	(United Kingdom) Jono Brown	All
Excelr8 Motorsport	80	(United Kingdom) Mike Phillips	All
Excelr8 Motorsport	81	(United Kingdom) Henry Gilbert	All
Excelr8 Motorsport	88	(United Kingdom) Daniel Bishop	4–5
Excelr8 Motorsport	94	(United Kingdom) Ben Gridley	6–7
Max Leaver Racing	23	(United Kingdom) Max Leaver	All

== Championship standings ==
Scoring system

Championship points were awarded for the first 15 positions in each Championship Race. Entries were required to complete 75% of the winning car's race distance in order to be classified and earn points. There were bonus points awarded for Pole Position and Fastest Lap.

Championship Race points

Position	1st	2nd	3rd	4th	5th	6th	7th	8th	9th	10th	11th	12th	13th	14th	15th
Points	20	17	15	13	11	10	9	8	7	6	5	4	3	2	1

=== Drivers' Championship ===
==== JCW Class ====
Pos	Driver	SIL		CAS		BHI			SNE				OUL		BHGP			DON				Pts
1	(United Kingdom) Lee Allen	3	1	4	1	1	1	2	1	1	DSQ	3	2	2	Ret	1	2	1	2	2	1	332
2	(United Kingdom) Chris Smith	2	2	7	5	5	3	1	4	4	4	2	5	1	DSQ	4	Ret	4	5	3	2	266
3	(United Kingdom) Chris Smiley	8	5	3	Ret	6	8	Ret	5	5	2	8	7	4	3	5	4	5	4	4	4	210
4	(United Kingdom) Sam Osborne	4	10	2	4	2	2	DSQ	3	3	1	4	6	3	Ret	Ret	Ret	10	9	5	5	207
5	(United Kingdom) Lee Pattison			5	2	15	DNS	DNS	13	Ret	DSQ	DNS	4	DSQ	2	3	1	2	1	1	6	170
6	(United Kingdom) Shane Stoney	7	6	1	6	3	5	3	6	DNS	5	6	1	DSQ	4	Ret	Ret					156
7	(United Kingdom) Martin Depper	5	3	6	3	7	4	6	2	9	Ret	5	Ret	8								126
8	(United Kingdom) Stewart Lines	6	4	9	8	4	6	11	11	10	8	Ret	10	DNS				7	10	6	Ret	116
9	(United Kingdom) Kevin O'Connor	9	7	DNS	DNS	11	10	8	10	8	6	10	Ret	Ret	5	9	Ret	11	Ret	8	7	105
10	(United Kingdom) William Davison					10	11	7	7	6	Ret	7	9	7	7	6	7					92
11	(United Kingdom) Bob Hosier	11	11	12	11	14	13	12	14	11	Ret	9	12	9	9	10	9	Ret	12	11	10	88
12	(United Kingdom) Patrick Mortimer	10	8	13	10	13	12	9	12	7	Ret	DNS	Ret	11	8	Ret	8	13	Ret	12	9	85
13	(United Kingdom) Chris Panayiotou	DNS	DNS	10	Ret	Ret	9	5					11	10				9	7	9	3	73
14	(United Kingdom) Arthur Forster			Ret	DNS	8	Ret	Ret					3	5				3	3	10	Ret	70
15	(United Kingdom) Ant Whorton-Eales								8	2	3	1										60
16	(United Kingdom) Paul O'Neill														1	2	3					52
17	(United Kingdom) Craig Freeman			14	Ret	12	14	10	9	Ret	7	Ret	8	6				Ret	DNS	DNS	DNS	48
18	(United Kingdom) Jason Richardson	Ret	DNS	11	9										DNS	7	5	6	8	DNS	DNS	46
19	(United Kingdom) Shaun King														6	8	6	8	6	Ret	Ret	46
20	(United Kingdom) Chris Knox	1	9	8	7																	44
21	(Sweden) Freddy Nordström					9	7	4														29
22	(United Kingdom) David Ogden																	12	11	7	8	26

==== Cooper Class ====
Pos	Driver	SIL		CAS		BHI			SNE				OUL		BHGP			DON				Pts
1	(United Kingdom) Henry Gilbert	1	1	2	1	1	1	1	1	4	1	1	1	2	1	1	6	3	1	1	5	379
2	(United Kingdom) Jono Brown	2	2	1	2	2	2	2	2	1	2	4	2	1	2	3	2	2	7	DNS	1	329
3	(United Kingdom) Max Leaver	4	4	4	3	4	3	4	3	3	3	2	4	4	3	2	1	1	2	2	2	308
4	(United Kingdom) Adrian Norman	5	6	6	5	5	5	7	6	6	6	6	6	6	5	6	5	5	5	4	6	217
5	(United Kingdom) Mike Phillips	6	7	5	4	6	Ret	6	5	5	5	5	5	5	6	5	4	6	4	5	4	210
6	(United Kingdom) Ben Gridley														4	4	3	4	3	3	7	94
7	(United Kingdom) Daniel Bishop								4	2	4	3	3	3								88
8	(United Kingdom) Simon Hillery	Ret	3	3	Ret	3	4	3														73
9	(United Kingdom) Martin Mortimer																	7	6	6	3	44
10	(United Kingdom) Trevor Bates					7	6	5														30
11	(United Kingdom) Dean Raymond	3	5	Ret	DNS																	27
