= 2009 Mini Challenge UK =

Motor racing competition

Seasons
- ← 2008 2010 →

The 2009 Mini Challenge season was the eighth season of the Mini Challenge UK. The season started on 18 April at Rockingham Motor Speedway and ended on 27 September at Snetterton Motor Racing Circuit. The season featured six rounds across the UK.

== Calendar ==
=== Race calendar ===
All 6 meetings ran both the Cooper and Cooper S classes.

| Round | | Circuit | Date |
|---|---|---|---|
| 1 | R1 | Rockingham Motor Speedway | 18–19 April |
| 1 | R2 | Rockingham Motor Speedway | 18–19 April |
| 1 | R3 | Rockingham Motor Speedway | 18–19 April |
| 2 | R4 | Brands Hatch | 6–7 June |
| 2 | R5 | Brands Hatch | 6–7 June |
| 2 | R6 | Brands Hatch | 6–7 June |
| 3 | R7 | Donington Park | 4–5 July |
| 3 | R8 | Donington Park | 4–5 July |
| 3 | R9 | Donington Park | 4–5 July |
| 4 | R10 | Castle Combe | 18–19 July |
| 4 | R11 | Castle Combe | 18–19 July |
| 4 | R12 | Castle Combe | 18–19 July |
| 5 | R13 | Croft Circuit | 22–23 August |
| 5 | R14 | Croft Circuit | 22–23 August |
| 5 | R15 | Croft Circuit | 22–23 August |
| 6 | R16 | Snetterton Motor Racing Circuit | 26–27 September |
| 6 | R17 | Snetterton Motor Racing Circuit | 26–27 September |
| 6 | R18 | Snetterton Motor Racing Circuit | 26–27 September |

== Entry list ==
| Team | No. | Driver | Rounds |
Cooper S Class
| Forster Motorsport | 1 | (United Kingdom) Martin Depper | All |
| Forster Motorsport | 7 | (United Kingdom) Arthur Forster | All |
| Forster Motorsport | 8 | (Republic of Ireland) Michael Cullen | 6 |
| Forster Motorsport | 12 | (United Kingdom) Jack Stanford | 1–2 |
| Forster Motorsport | 66 | (United Kingdom) Steve Liquorish | All |
| Mini Motorsport | 4 | (United Kingdom) Shaun King | All |
| Double Six Racing | 5 | (United Kingdom) Phil House | All |
| Coastal Racing | 18 | (United Kingdom) Chris Knox | 5 |
| Coastal Racing | 18 | (United Kingdom) Chris Smith | 6 |
| Coastal Racing | 23 | (United Kingdom) Chris Smith | 5 |
| Coastal Racing | 23 | (United Kingdom) Chris Panayiotou | 1–2 |
| Coastal Racing | 33 | (United Kingdom) Lawrence Sait | All |
| Advent Motorsport | 12 | (United Kingdom) Graham Parsons | 4 |
| ES Racing | 14 | (United Kingdom) Chris James | 6 |
| Team Formula Racing | 17 | (United Kingdom) Carl Bennett | 1–5 |
| Team Formula Racing | 17 | (United Kingdom) Jason Greatrex | 6 |
| Team Formula Racing | 70 | (United Kingdom) Oly Mortimer | All |
| Privateer | 21 | (United Kingdom) Ben Harvey | 5 |
| Privateer | 97 | (United Kingdom) Roger Grimshaw | All |
| Truck Align | 26 | (United Kingdom) Lee Allen | All |
| Mark Fish Motorsport | 50 | (United Kingdom) Jason Richardson | All |
Cooper Class
| Mark Fish Motorsport | 2 | (United Kingdom) Luke Caudle | All |
| Excelr8 Motorsport | 3 | (United Kingdom) Roger Bates | 1–4, 6 |
| Excelr8 Motorsport | 52 | (United Kingdom) Keith Issatt | 2 |
| Excelr8 Motorsport | 52 | (United Kingdom) Justina Williams | 6 |
| Excelr8 Motorsport | 52 | (United Kingdom) Craig Freeman | 3–5 |
| Excelr8 Motorsport | 69 | (United Kingdom) Craig Freeman | 6 |
| Double Six Racing | 6 | (United Kingdom) Joey Powis | All |
| Privateer | 9 | (United Kingdom) Kevin O'Connor | All |
| Privateer | 10 | (United Kingdom) Dave Nixon | 2, 4 |
| Advent Motorsport | 19 | (United Kingdom) Sarah Parsons | 1–2, 4–6 |
| Advent Motorsport | 55 | (United Kingdom) James Blyth | All |
| Advent Motorsport | 76 | (United Kingdom) Rob Ladbrook | 1 |
| Advent Motorsport | 76 | (United Kingdom) Graham Parsons | 2 |
| Advent Motorsport | 77 | (United Kingdom) Nigel Johnson | 1–4 |
| Advent Motorsport | 77 | (United Kingdom) Tim Crighton | 6 |
| Waddington Motorsport | 35 | (United Kingdom) Josh Waddington | 5 |
| Team Formula Racing | 57 | (United Kingdom) Nick Booth | All |

== Championship standings ==
Scoring system

Championship points were awarded for the first 15 positions in each Championship Race. Entries were required to complete 75% of the winning car's race distance in order to be classified and earn points. There were bonus points awarded for Pole Position and Fastest Lap.

Championship Race points

| Position | 1st | 2nd | 3rd | 4th | 5th | 6th | 7th | 8th | 9th | 10th | 11th | 12th | 13th | 14th | 15th |
| Points | 20 | 17 | 15 | 13 | 11 | 10 | 9 | 8 | 7 | 6 | 5 | 4 | 3 | 2 | 1 |

=== Drivers' Championship ===
==== Cooper S Class ====
| Pos | Driver | ROC | | | BHI | | | DON | | | CAS | | | CRO | | | SNE | | | Pts |
|---|---|---|---|---|---|---|---|---|---|---|---|---|---|---|---|---|---|---|---|---|
| 1 | (United Kingdom) Oly Mortimer | 1 | 1 | 2 | 2 | 1 | Ret | 1 | 1 | 2 | 3 | 3 | 4 | 4 | 2 | 1 | 2 | 1 | 1 | 308 |
| 2 | (United Kingdom) Martin Depper | 13 | 4 | 1 | 1 | 3 | 1 | 3 | 3 | 9 | 2 | 2 | 3 | 2 | 3 | 2 | 3 | 2 | 4 | 278 |
| 3 | (United Kingdom) Arthur Forster | 2 | 2 | 4 | 3 | 4 | Ret | 2 | 2 | 4 | 1 | 1 | 8 | 1 | 1 | 4 | 6 | 4 | 2 | 268 |
| 4 | (United Kingdom) Phil House | 4 | 5 | Ret | 4 | 2 | 3 | 7 | 6 | 3 | 12 | 5 | 5 | 3 | 6 | 3 | 1 | 5 | 7 | 214 |
| 5 | (United Kingdom) Lee Allen | 5 | DSQ | 10 | 6 | 5 | 2 | 6 | 5 | 1 | 7 | 6 | 1 | 6 | 5 | 5 | 4 | 3 | 3 | 210 |
| 6 | (United Kingdom) Shaun King | 9 | 6 | 5 | 7 | Ret | 6 | 4 | 4 | 5 | 4 | 8 | 7 | 7 | 13 | 9 | 7 | 6 | 5 | 163 |
| 7 | (United Kingdom) Jason Richardson | 8 | 7 | 6 | 9 | 7 | 7 | 9 | 9 | 8 | 8 | 11 | 10 | 9 | 8 | 7 | 8 | 7 | Ret | 134 |
| 8 | (United Kingdom) Steve Liquorish | 6 | DSQ | 7 | 8 | Ret | 8 | 5 | 8 | 6 | 6 | 7 | 6 | 8 | 9 | Ret | 10 | Ret | 9 | 121 |
| 9 | (United Kingdom) Carl Bennett | 7 | Ret | DNS | 10 | 8 | 5 | 8 | 7 | 7 | 5 | 4 | 2 | Ret | 7 | 8 | | | | 118 |
| 10 | (United Kingdom) Lawrence Sait | 11 | 8 | 8 | 12 | 10 | Ret | 10 | 10 | Ret | 9 | 9 | 9 | 10 | 10 | 10 | Ret | 10 | Ret | 88 |
| 11 | (United Kingdom) Roger Grimshaw | 12 | Ret | 9 | 13 | 11 | 9 | 11 | 11 | 10 | 10 | 10 | 11 | 11 | 12 | Ret | 11 | Ret | 10 | 79 |
| 12 | (United Kingdom) Jack Stanford | 3 | 3 | 3 | 5 | 6 | 10 | | | | | | | | | | | | | 72 |
| 13 | (United Kingdom) Chris Knox | | | | | | | | | | | | | 5 | 4 | 6 | | | | 34 |
| 14 | (United Kingdom) Chris Panayiotou | 10 | Ret | Ret | 11 | 9 | 4 | | | | | | | | | | | | | 31 |
| 15 | (United Kingdom) Jason Greatrex | | | | | | | | | | | | | | | | 5 | 8 | 6 | 29 |
| 16 | (Republic of Ireland) Michael Cullen | | | | | | | | | | | | | | | | 13 | 9 | 8 | 19 |
| 17 | (United Kingdom) Chris James | | | | | | | | | | | | | | | | 12 | 11 | 11 | 15 |
| 18 | (United Kingdom) Ben Harvey | | | | | | | | | | | | | 12 | 11 | 11 | | | | 14 |
| 19 | (United Kingdom) Chris Smith | | | | | | | | | | | | | 13 | DNS | DNS | 9 | Ret | DNS | 10 |
| 20 | (United Kingdom) Graham Parsons | | | | | | | | | | 11 | DNS | DNS | | | | | | | 5 |

==== Cooper Class ====
| Pos | Driver | ROC | | | BHI | | | DON | | | CAS | | | CRO | | | SNE | | | Pts |
|---|---|---|---|---|---|---|---|---|---|---|---|---|---|---|---|---|---|---|---|---|
| 1 | (United Kingdom) Luke Caudle | Ret | 8 | 9 | 3 | 2 | 2 | 1 | 1 | 1 | 3 | 2 | 1 | 1 | 1 | 1 | 1 | 1 | 1 | 310 |
| 2 | (United Kingdom) James Blyth | 2 | 1 | 1 | 1 | 1 | 3 | 2 | Ret | 3 | 2 | 3 | 2 | 3 | 3 | 2 | 2 | 2 | 2 | 293 |
| 3 | (United Kingdom) Joey Powis | 1 | 2 | 3 | 4 | 3 | 6 | 4 | 2 | 2 | 1 | 1 | 3 | 2 | 2 | 4 | Ret | 4 | 4 | 269 |
| 4 | (United Kingdom) Nick Booth | 3 | 4 | 2 | 10 | 9 | 8 | 8 | 3 | 4 | 5 | 4 | 4 | 4 | 4 | 5 | Ret | 3 | 5 | 202 |
| 5 | (United Kingdom) Kevin O'Connor | 6 | 7 | 6 | 6 | 5 | 4 | 4 | 4 | 6 | 6 | 5 | 5 | 6 | 6 | 7 | Ret | 5 | 10 | 177 |
| 6 | (United Kingdom) Sarah Parsons | 5 | 3 | 4 | 9 | 6 | Ret | | | | 8 | 7 | 7 | 5 | 5 | 3 | 4 | 7 | 7 | 150 |
| 7 | (United Kingdom) Nigel Johnson | 4 | 5 | 5 | 8 | 8 | 9 | 3 | 5 | 5 | 7 | 8 | 8 | | | | | | | 120 |
| 8 | (United Kingdom) Roger Bates | 8 | 9 | 8 | 11 | 10 | 10 | 7 | 6 | 8 | 10 | 10 | 10 | | | | 7 | 8 | 9 | 121 |
| 9 | (United Kingdom) Craig Freeman | | | | | | | 6 | Ret | 7 | 9 | 9 | 9 | 8 | 8 | 8 | 6 | 9 | 8 | 89 |
| 10 | (United Kingdom) Dave Nixon | | | | 7 | 7 | 5 | | | | 4 | 6 | 6 | | | | | | | 62 |
| 11 | (United Kingdom) Graham Parsons | | | | 2 | 4 | 1 | | | | | | | | | | | | | 38 |
| 12 | (United Kingdom) Keith Issatt | | | | 5 | DSQ | 7 | | | | | | | | | | | | | 34 |
| 13 | (United Kingdom) Justina Williams | | | | | | | | | | | | | | | | 5 | 6 | 6 | 31 |
| 14 | (United Kingdom) Tim Crighton | | | | | | | | | | | | | | | | 3 | Ret | 3 | 30 |
| 15 | (United Kingdom) Rob Ladbrook | 7 | 6 | 7 | | | | | | | | | | | | | | | | 28 |
| 16 | (United Kingdom) Josh Waddington | | | | | | | | | | | | | 7 | 7 | 6 | | | | 28 |
