= Mini Challenge UK =

British one-make series on the ToCA package

- Category: One-make racing by Mini
- Country: United Kingdom
- Inaugural season: 2002
- Classes: JCW; JCW Sport; Cooper
- Constructors: Mini
- Tyre suppliers: Goodyear
- Drivers' champion: JCW (United Kingdom) Tom Ovenden; JCW Sport (United Kingdom) Alfie Garford
- Teams' champion: JCW; EXCELR8 Motorsport; JCW Sport; Wera Alliance Racing Academy
- Official website: Mini Challenge UK

The Mini Challenge UK, for sponsorship reasons the Power Maxed Mini Challenge and the MAIRON Motorsport Mini Challenge Trophy, is a one-make race series began in 2002 and since 2020 the JCW and JCW Sport championships have run as a support package to the British Touring Car Championship. The Cooper class has ran separately from the ToCA package, with an occasional guest appearance.

The series umbrella includes multiple classes:

- JCW Class, based on Gen 3 F56 MINI Hatch, target power 255bhp, circa 1170kg with driver, features a Quaife 6-speed sequential gearbox (specifically the QBM2M model), paired with a 2-litre turbocharged engine producing up to 275 bhp. This sequential unit is designed for rapid shifts and includes options for manual or air-actuated paddle shift setups.
- JCW Sport Class (added 2024), chassis as above but with 225bhp, uses a standard OE H-pattern 6-speed gearbox.
- Cooper Class (added 2021), with less aggressive chassis modifications and is equipped with an ultra-robust 6-speed manual gearbox in a 1.6-litre, 130 bhp car.

Competition is organised into JCW Championship, JCW Sport Championship, and Cooper Trophy championships. For 2024 the first two will support BTCC for 7 weekends of the calendar and the Cooper Trophy will feature at three of those, with the other four weekends at Truck or BARC events.

There are various Cup competitions within this structure such as Rookie Cup and Graduate Cup.

Throughout the championship's history it established itself as one of the main routes into topline Touring Car racing, and drivers went on to do well in the Renault Clio Cup United Kingdom, British Touring Car Championship and British GT Championship. Past and drivers such as Jeff Smith, Charlie Butler-Henderson, Harry Vaulkhard, Vicki Butler-Henderson, Brett Smith, Paul O'Neill, Nick Foster, Arthur Forster, Stewart Lines, Martin Depper, Chris Smiley, Ant Whorton-Eales, Ronan Pearson, Dan Zelos and Tom Ovenden.

== The cars ==
=== Mini F56 (since 2015) ===
Introduced in 2015, the F56 is the first purpose-built race car to race in the championship, a 2-litre turbocharged BMW engine and a 6-speed sequential gearbox means that it is also the most powerful car in the championship with 275 bhp.

=== Mini R56 (since 2010) ===
Introduced in 2010 as the new JCW, it has a 1.6-litre turbocharged BMW engine along with slick tyres and a 6-speed gearbox to produce 220 bhp.

=== Mini R53 (2004–2010) ===
Introduced in the third season, the R53 has a 1.6-litre supercharged BMW engine producing 195 bhp along with slick tyres and a 6-speed gearbox.

=== Mini R50 (2013–2016) ===
Introduced in 2013 as a replacement for the Cooper's, with slick tyres, a 6-speed gearbox and a 1.6-litre BMW engine producing 135 bhp.

=== Mini Cooper (2002–2012, 2017–) ===
Introduced in the first season, the Cooper is the basic entry-level car with treaded tyres and a 5-speed road gearbox along with an ordinary engine producing 120 bhp.

== The classes ==
Classes
Car	2002	2003	2004	2005	2006	2007	2008	2009	2010	2011	2012	2013	2014	2015	2016	2017	2018	2019
Mini Cooper	Cooper															Cooper Am		
Mini R53			Cooper S												Open			Cooper S
Mini R56									JCW					JCW	Open			Cooper S
Mini R50												Cooper				Cooper Pro		
Mini F56														F56	JCW			
Car	2002	2003	2004	2005	2006	2007	2008	2009	2010	2011	2012	2013	2014	2015	2016	2017	2018	2019

== Champions ==
Cooper			Cooper S/ Open (2015–2019)		JCW		Open (2016)/ Cooper Am (2017–2019)		JCW Sport (2024–)	
Season	Driver	Team	Driver	Team	Driver	Team	Driver	Team	Driver	Team
2002	(United Kingdom) Steve Meli	Mark Fish Motorsport	Not contested		Not contested		Not contested			
2003	(United Kingdom) Mark Speller	Mark Fish Motorsport	Not contested		Not contested		Not contested			
2004	(United Kingdom) Gary Robertshaw	Robertshaw Racing	(United Kingdom) Martin Wallbank	Mark Fish Motorsport	Not contested		Not contested			
2005	(United Kingdom) Barney Craggs	Sussex Road and Race	(United Kingdom) Arthur Forster	Forster Motorsport	Not contested		Not contested			
2006	(United Kingdom) Gareth Nixon	Nixon Motorsport	(Sweden) Freddy Nordström	Advent Motorsport	Not contested		Not contested			
2007	(United Kingdom) Jenny Ryan	Mark Fish Motorsport	(United Kingdom) Oly Mortimer	Tynecastle Racing	Not contested		Not contested			
2008	(United Kingdom) Graham Parsons	Advent Motorsport	(United Kingdom) Martin Depper	Forster Motorsport	Not contested		Not contested			
2009	(United Kingdom) Luke Caudle	Mark Fish Motorsport	(United Kingdom) Oly Mortimer	Team Formula Racing	Not contested		Not contested			
2010	(United Kingdom) David Ogden	Mark Fish Motorsport	(United Kingdom) Lee Allen	Truck Align	(United Kingdom) Luke Caudle	Excelr8 Motorsport	Not contested			
2011	(United Kingdom) Ant Whorton-Eales	Excelr8 Motorsport	Not contested		(United Kingdom) Chris Knox	Excelr8 Motorsport	Not contested			
2012	(United Kingdom) Henry Gilbert	Excelr8 Motorsport	Not contested		(United Kingdom) Lee Allen	Truck Align	Not contested			
2013	(United Kingdom) Shane Stoney	Coastal Racing	Not contested		(United Kingdom) Chris Smiley	IN:MINI	Not contested			
2014	(United Kingdom) Shane Stoney	Coastal Racing	Not contested		(United Kingdom) Chris Knox	Excelr8 Motorsport	Not contested			
2015	(United Kingdom) Nathan Harrison	Coastal Racing	(United Kingdom) Neil Newstead	Oakfield Motorsport	(United Kingdom) Charlie Butler-Henderson	Oakfield Motorsport	Not contested			
2016	(United Kingdom) Max Bladon	Excelr8 Motorsport	(United Kingdom) Scott Jeffs	Privateer	(United Kingdom) David Grady	Unitec Motorsport	(United Kingdom) Keith Issatt	Lawrence Davey Racing		
2017	(United Kingdom) Matt Hammond	Excelr8 Motorsport	(United Kingdom) Ben Dimmack	Sussex Road and Race	(United Kingdom) Brett Smith	Eurotech Racing	(United Kingdom) Stuart McLaren	Hybrid Tune Motorsport		
2018	(United Kingdom) Kyle Reid	Privateer	(United Kingdom) Will Fairclough	AReeve Motorsport	(United Kingdom) Ant Whorton-Eales	JamSport Racing	(United Kingdom) Alex Nevill	Privateer		
2019	(United Kingdom) Robert Dalgliesh	Privateer	(United Kingdom) Dan Butcher-Lloyd	Privateer	(United Kingdom) James Gornall	Privateer	(United Kingdom) Lee Pearce	Privateer		
2020	(United Kingdom) Harry Nunn	AReeve Motorsport			(United Kingdom) Nathan Harrison	EXCELR8 Motorsport				
2021	(United Kingdom) Dominic Wheatley	PerformanceTek Racing			(United Kingdom) Dan Zelos	EXCELR8 Motorsport				
2022	(United Kingdom) Nelson King	Graves Motorsport			(United Kingdom) Sam Weller	Hybrid Tune				
2023	(United Kingdom) Tom Ovenden	EXCELR8 Motorsport			(United Kingdom) Dan Zelos	EXCELR8 Motorsport				
2024	(United Kingdom) Harry Hickton	Westbourne Motorsport			(United Kingdom) Dan Zelos	EXCELR8 Motorsport			(United Kingdom) Dylan Hotchin	Jamsport Racing
2025	(United Kingdom) Alex Keens	Graves Motorsport			(United Kingdom) Tom Ovenden	EXCELR8 Motorsport			(United Kingdom) Archie Johnson	Jamsport Racing
2026	(United Kingdom) Alex Keens	Graves Motorsport			(United Kingdom) Tom Ovenden	EXCELR8 Motorsport			(United Kingdom) Alfie Garford	Wera Alliance Racing Academy
