= Steven Kane =

British racing driver (born 1980)

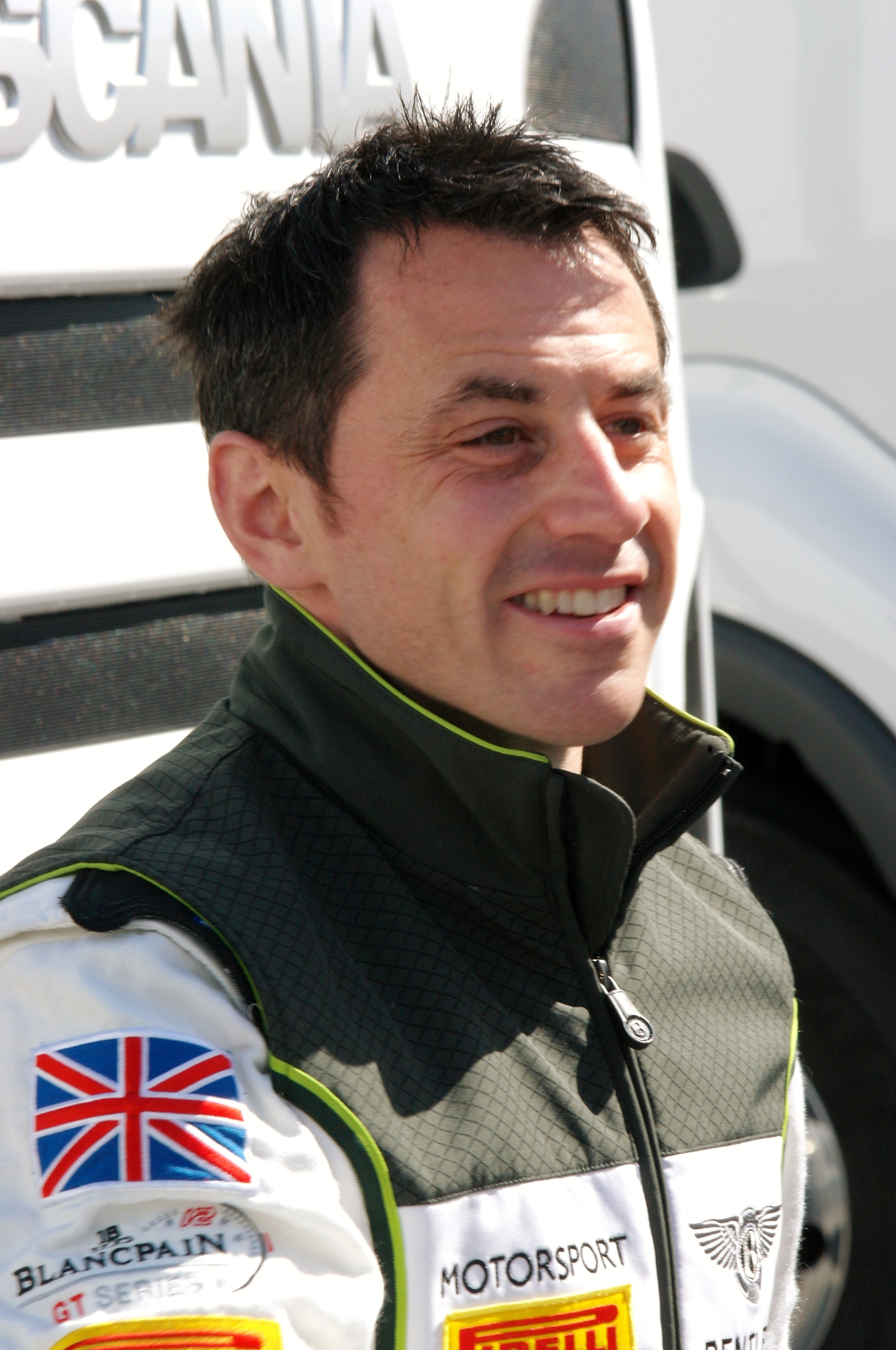
- Kane at the Silverstone round of the 2014 Blancpain Endurance Series season.
- Nationality: (United Kingdom) British
- Born: 5 June 1980 (age 46) Newtownards, Northern Ireland

Blancpain Endurance Series, Avon Tyres British GT Championship career
- Debut season: 2013
- Current team: M-Sport Bentley
- Categorisation: FIA Gold
- Car number: 7
- Starts: 2
- Wins: 1
- Poles: 0
- Fastest laps: 0
- Best finish: 1st – Silverstone in 2014

Previous series
- 2009–12 2008, 2010 2009 2007 2007 2006 2004 2003, 2005 2002 2001 2000: American Le Mans Series; BTCC; Belgian Touring Cars – S1; Porsche Supercup; Porsche Carrera Cup GB; Formula Renault 3.5 Series; Spanish Formula Three; British Formula 3 Formula Renault UK; British Junior Formula Ford; Irish Formula Ford

Championship titles
- 2001: British Junior Formula Ford

Awards
- 2001: McLaren Autosport Award

Steven Colin Kane (born 5 June 1980) is a British racing driver who currently competes in the Blancpain Endurance Series and Avon Tyres British GT Championship for M-Sport Bentley driving a Bentley Continental GT3.

== Career ==
Kane, who was born in Newtownards, County Down, Northern Ireland, and grow up in Ballynahinch, was voted McLaren Autosport BRDC Young Driver of the Year in 2001 (earning a test with the McLaren Formula One team), after winning the Junior Formula Ford Zetec championship by taking eight wins and four runners-up spots in twelve races. From 2003 to 2005, he competed in Formula Three; finishing as runner-up in the Scholarship class (for year-old cars) of the 2003 British Formula 3 Championship, finishing third overall in Spain in 2004, and in 2005, he was ninth in the main British F3 championship. That year he took three poles and a win, despite the deal only coming together a day before the season began. At the end of 2005, he became the first driver ever to race a Lola at the Macau Formula Three race. He then raced in the Formula Renault 3.5 Series, with a best result of second.

For 2007, Kane moved into the Porsche Carrera Cup GB, finishing third overall and fighting for the title until the final round, with a series-high seven wins, including pole position at Thruxton.

In 2008, Kane competed in the BTCC, driving a BMW for the Motorbase Performance team. He started the year strongly, finishing eighth on his debut and later taking a sixth place at Rockingham Motor Speedway after a tough weekend. At Croft he ran fourth for a while, but dropped out with an electrical problem on the final lap. His first podium finish came at the next meeting at Snetterton. At the next meeting at Oulton Park, he qualified 15th before advancing to ninth in race 1, and from ninth on the grid to fourth in race 2, before being eliminated from race 3 after a first-lap hit from Tom Chilton.

Kane did not return to the BTCC for 2009. He is the series test driver for the new FIA Formula Two Championship, and co-commentator alongside Martin Haven on Eurosport2's coverage of the championship.

On 26 September 2009, Kane was a guest driver in the Kumho BMW Championship at Oulton Park. He qualified first in both qualifying sessions, and won both races. He was later punished with two points on his racing license after he was deemed by the stewards to have taken out another competitor on purpose.

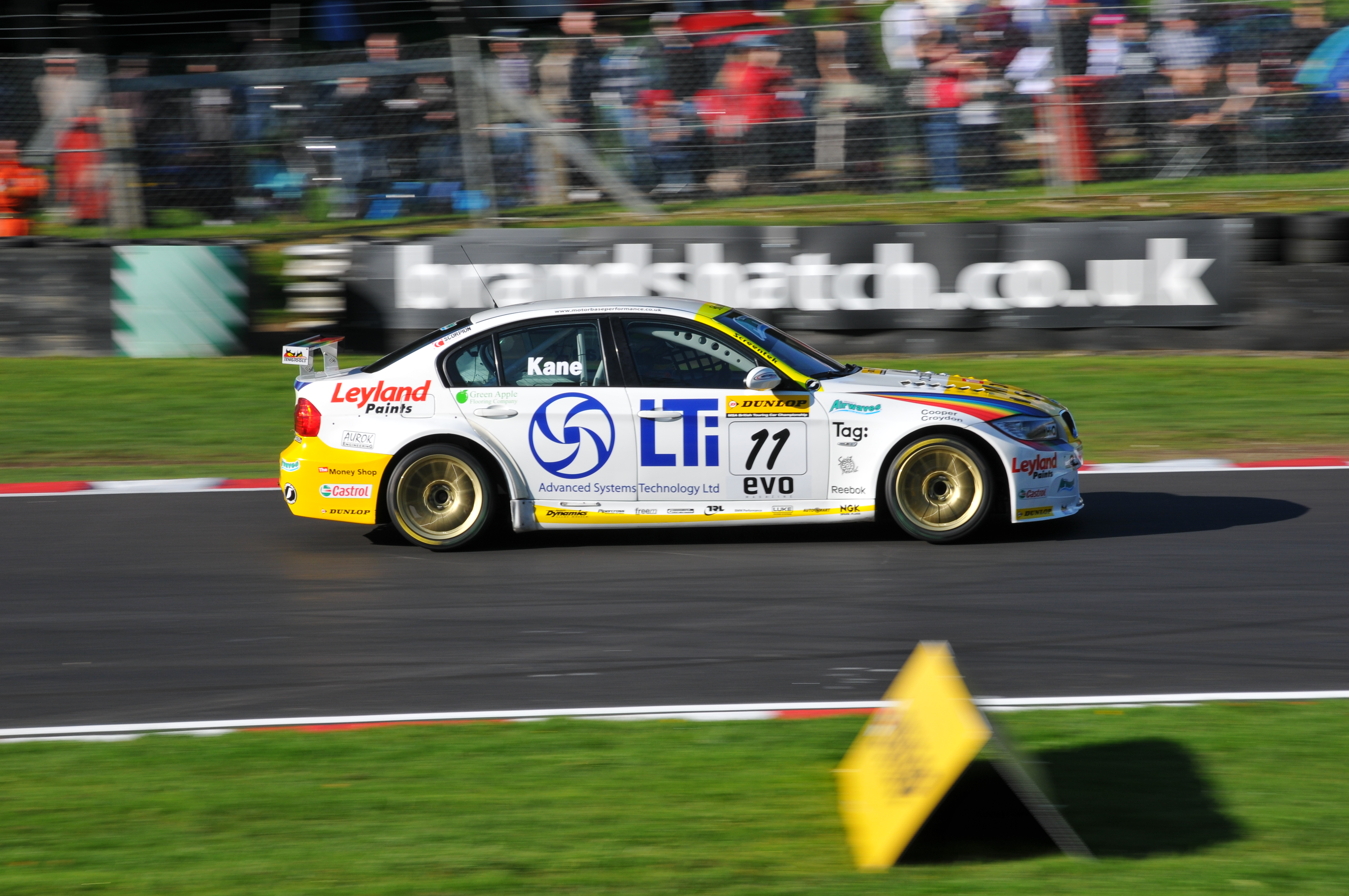
Kane driving the Airwaves Racing BMW 320si at Brands Hatch during the 2010 British Touring Car Championship season.

Kane returned to the BTCC with the Airwaves BMW team for the 2010 season, partnering Mat Jackson. Kane won his first BTCC race at Thruxton on 4 April 2010 when he completed a one-two for Airwaves BMW in race three. He finished sixth overall at the end of the 2010 season with 169 points.

On 15 June 2011, it was announced that Kane would pilot a Lola-Mazda prototype for Dyson Racing in the American Le Mans Series, partnering with Humaid al-Masaood. He and al-Masaood finished third overall (and 3rd in the LMP1 class) in each of their first two ALMS events at Lime Rock Park and Mosport. Kane and al-Masaood claimed their first overall victory at the inaugural Baltimore Grand Prix.

For 2012, Kane will race with Humaid al-Masaood in the Oryx Racing's Audi R8 GRAND-AM program in the Rolex Sports Car Series. In addition to this, Kane will also compete at the 12 Hours of Sebring with the Dyson Racing team.

Kane switched from racing in North America to Europe in 2013, joining JRM Racing to campaign a Nissan GT-R in the Blancpain Endurance Series alongside Peter Dumbreck and Lucas Luhr. Kane and Dumbreck finished eighth in the series' Pro Cup standings.

Kane has joined M-Sport for 2014, driving a Bentley Continental GT3 alongside Humaid Al Masaood in the British GT Championship, and with Guy Smith and Andy Meyrick in the Blancpain Endurance Series, after scoring a fourth place with the team at the 2013 Abu Dhabi Gulf 12 Hours.

2014 started brightly for Kane as he and his team mates Guy Smith and Andy Meyrick took a fourth place at Monza in April, followed by a home win at Silverstone in late May. A further victory came at the end of June at Paul Ricard which ultimately ensured a runners-up position in the final Blancpain Endurance Series standings.

For 2015, Kane stayed with Bentley. His season started well with fourth-place finishes at both the Bathurst 12 Hours in February and the opening Monza Blancpain race in April.

== Racing record ==
=== Complete Formula Renault 3.5 Series results ===
(key) (Races in bold indicate pole position) (Races in italics indicate fastest lap)

Year	Entrant	1	2	3	4	5	6	7	8	9	10	11	12	13	14	15	16	17	DC	Points
2006	Epsilon Euskadi	ZOL; 1; 22	ZOL; 2; 4	MON; 1; 16	IST; 1; 20	IST; 2; 18	MIS; 1; 14	MIS; 2; 18	SPA; 1; 10	SPA; 2; 10	NÜR; 1 Ret	NÜR; 2; 20	DON; 1; 15	DON; 2; 17	LMS; 1; 21	LMS; 2; 10	CAT; 1; 12	CAT; 2; 8	20th	15

^{†} Driver did not finish the race, but was classified as he completed more than 90% of the race distance.

=== Complete Porsche Supercup results ===
(key) (Races in bold indicate pole position) (Races in italics indicate fastest lap)

Year	Team	1	2	3	4	5	6	7	8	9	10	11	DC	Points
2007	HISAQ Competition	BHR1	BHR2	ESP	MON	FRA	GBR; 15	GER	HUN	TUR	BEL	ITA	NC†	0†

† Guest driver – Not eligible for points.

=== Complete British Touring Car Championship results ===
(key) (Races in bold indicate pole position – 1 point awarded in first race) (Races in italics indicate fastest lap – 1 point awarded all races) (* signifies that driver lead race for at least one lap – 1 point given all races)

Year	Team	Car	1	2	3	4	5	6	7	8	9	10	11	12	13	14	15	16	17	18	19	20	21	22	23	24	25	26	27	28	29	30	Pos	Pts
2008	Motorbase Performance	BMW 320si	BRH; 1; 8	BRH; 2 Ret	BRH; 3 DNS	ROC; 1; 10	ROC; 2; 10	ROC; 3; 13	DON; 1; 6	DON; 2; 12	DON; 3; 16	THR; 1; 12	THR; 2; 13	THR; 3; 9	CRO; 1; 7	CRO; 2 Ret	CRO; 3 Ret	SNE; 1; 8	SNE; 2; 6	SNE; 3; 2	OUL; 1; 9	OUL; 2; 4	OUL; 3 Ret	KNO; 1; 12	KNO; 2; 14	KNO; 3; 9	SIL; 1 Ret	SIL; 2; 5	SIL; 3; 12	BRH; 1; 2	BRH; 2; 5	BRH; 3; 2	11th	86
2010	Airwaves BMW	BMW 320si	THR; 1 NC	THR; 2; 8	THR; 3; 1*	ROC; 1; 5	ROC; 2; 3	ROC; 3; 3	BRH; 1; 11	BRH; 2; 7	**BRH**; **3**; 3	OUL; 1; 6	OUL; 2; 5	OUL; 3; 2	CRO; 1; 11	CRO; 2 Ret	CRO; 3; 3	SNE; 1; 7	SNE; 2; 4	SNE; 3; 6	SIL; 1; 9	SIL; 2; 8	SIL; 3; 7	KNO; 1; 3	KNO; 2; 5	KNO; 3 Ret	DON; 1; 6	DON; 2; 6	DON; 3; 4	BRH; 1; 11	BRH; 2; 6	BRH; 3; 2	6th	169

Awards
Preceded by Anthony Davidson	McLaren Autosport BRDC Award; 2001	Succeeded by Jamie Green
