= 2010 British Touring Car Championship =

53rd season of the British Touring Car Championship

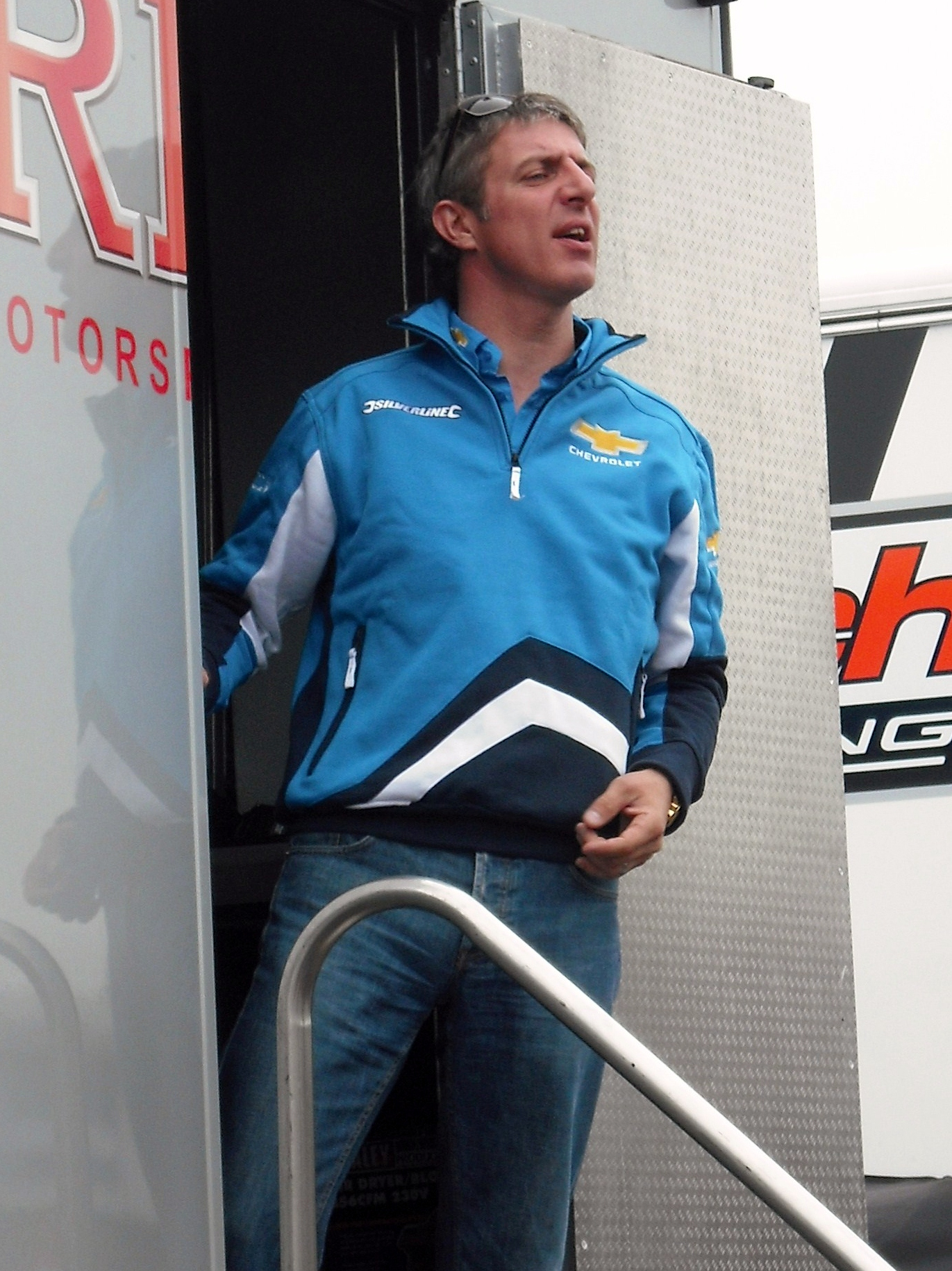
Jason Plato won the championship with 260 points

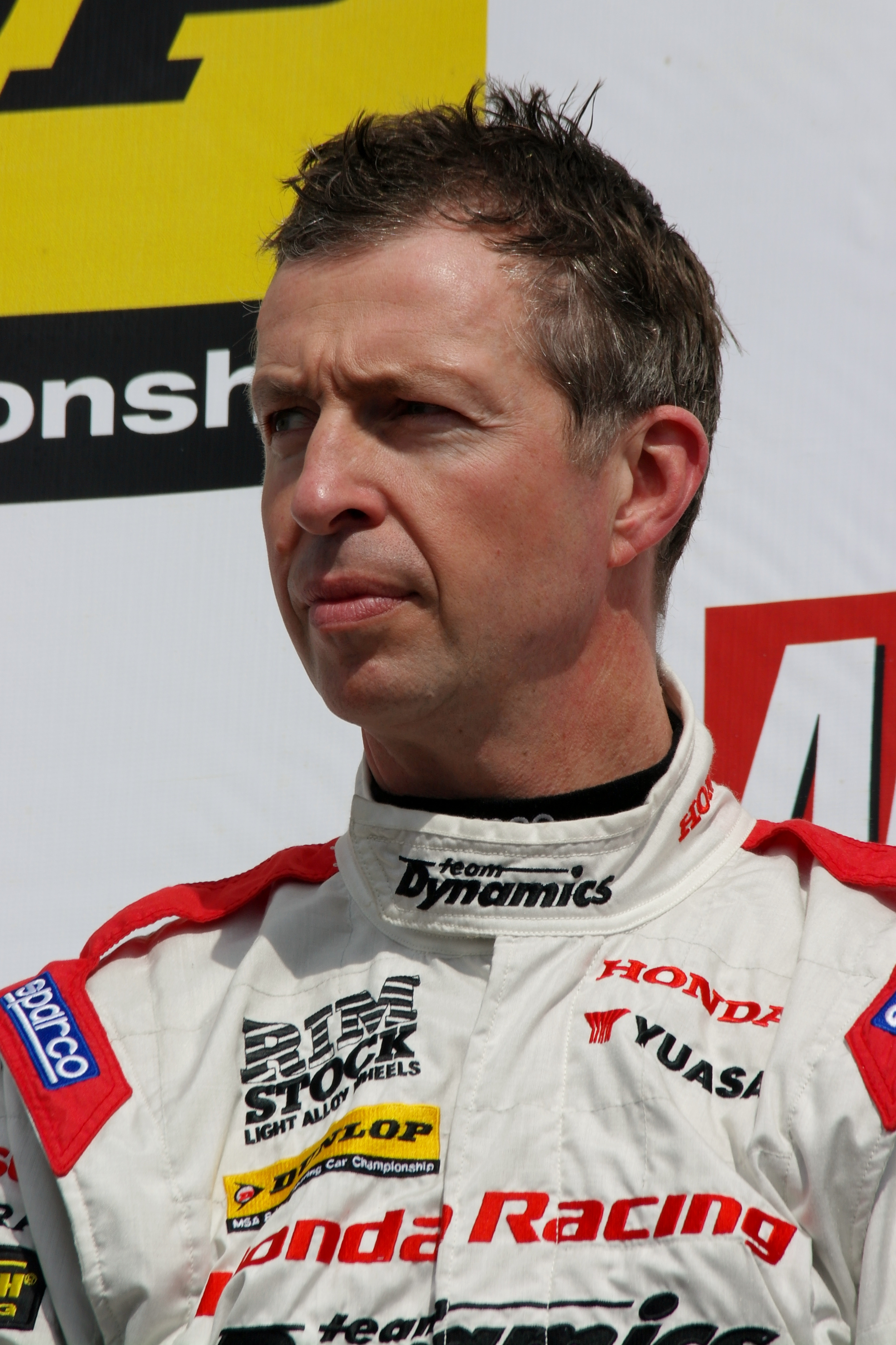
Matt Neal (pictured in 2012) finished second, 31 points behind Plato

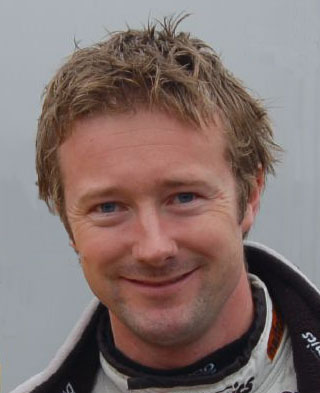
Gordon Shedden (pictured in 2007) finished the season in third place, and was in mathematical contention to win until the final round

The 2010 Dunlop MSA British Touring Car Championship season was the 53rd British Touring Car Championship (BTCC) season. It began at Thruxton Circuit on 4 April and finished after 30 races over ten events at Brands Hatch on 10 October.

RML Chevrolet driver Jason Plato claimed the championship with a win in the penultimate race of the season leading home season long rival, Honda Racing Team's Matt Neal. On his way to his second BTCC crown, Plato claimed seven victories through the course of the season (equalling Andy Rouse's all-time record of 60) compared to Neal's five wins. The final victory margin was 31 points. Neal's teammate Gordon Shedden also had a shot at the title heading into the final round but a broken driveshaft immediately prior to the start of Race 2 at Brands Hatch left him too far adrift and he finished the title 42 points behind Plato.

Despite finishing fourth in the outright points chase Arena Motorsport Ford driver Tom Onslow-Cole lost the Independents' Trophy to team mate Tom Chilton. Chilton ended up eight points clear of Onslow-Cole with Motorbase Performance BMW driver Steven Kane finishing just two points behind Chilton.

The combined performances of Neal and Shedden won for the Honda Racing Team the Teams' title. It was the third title for Team Dynamics and the first time they had won the manufacturers crown for long-time partners Honda. The combined performances of Chilton and Onslow-Cole allowed Arena Motorsport to claim the Independent Teams' trophy, breaking a three-year stranglehold on that trophy by West Surrey Racing.

== Changes for 2010 ==
The loss of RAC sponsorship after four seasons meant WSR were forced to release both reigning Champion Colin Turkington and Stephen Jelley. Rob Collard returned to the team he'd previously driven for in 2005 and 2006 while Andy Neate embarked on his first full season after a couple of one-off appearances and having missed on out on a WSR seat in 2008. Motorbase Performance continued to compete as Airwaves BMW with Mat Jackson replacing Collard and Steven Kane returning in place of Jonathan Adam. A third entry for former ASCAR Champion Ben Collins appeared at the final meeting of the season on the Brands Hatch Indy Circuit. Forster Motorsport also entered a pair of BMWs for Martin Depper and Arthur Forster.

After their impressive performance with Independently-run Lacettis in 2009, the RML-run Racing Silverline team received works support from Chevrolet and upgraded to a pair of Cruzes for Jason Plato and Clio Cup graduate Alex MacDowall.

With Vauxhall pulling out at the end of 2009, 2010 would be the first season in which there was no works-manufacturer team representing Vauxhall. As a result, Triple 8 became an Independent team for the first time in its history, and entered a pair of Vectra's with Fabrizio Giovanardi set to continue as lead driver and reigning Clio Cup Champion Phil Glew as his team-mate. However, the team's new sponsor Uniq pulled out after the season-opener at Thruxton, despite two wins from Giovanardi, forcing them to release both drivers. For the remainder of the season, the team ran James Nash in one car with the second car making three further appearances, each time in the hands of a newcomer (Daniel Lloyd at Croft, Jeff Smith at Knockhill and Sam Tordoff at Brands Hatch Indy). Andrew Jordan returned to his father Mike's team, now competing as Pirtek Racing and David Pinkney returned with his own team, both of whom also driving Vectras but running the new NGTC engines. Boulevard Team Racing continued to run Martin Johnson in what was to be the Vauxhall Astra Coupe's BTCC swansong.

Team Dynamics received support from Honda, becoming the first Honda works team since 2004. Matt Neal and Gordon Shedden returned to the team while their old Integras were still represented by Tech-Speed. Paul O'Neill was now partnered by John George in place of Martyn Bell with a third Integra entered by Lea Wood from the Brands Hatch GP meeting onwards (although the team sat out Knockhill as did Forster Motorsport). Former Independent's and Production Class Champions Barwell Motorsport and James Kaye returned with a 4th Integra for the final two meetings. TH Motorsport ran Matt Hamilton in a Civic Type-R for the first four meetings before pulling out.

Team Aon continued to run their Ford Focuses with Tom Onslow-Cole now partnering Tom Chilton full-time. The Focuses were converted to run on Liquified Petroleum Gas (LPG) before the season started.

Tom Boardman and his family-run team returned under the Special Tuning UK banner, driving a SEAT Leon. The team ran Phil Glew in a second Leon with an NGTC engine at Silverstone with Boardman running the NGTC engine at Knockhill.

For the first time since 1989, a Volkswagen was entered in the BTCC with AMD Racing running Shaun Hollamby in a Super 2000 Golf.

== Teams and drivers ==
The official entry list was announced at the series' Media Day at Brands Hatch on 23 March 2010.

Team	Car	No.	Drivers	Rounds
Constructor S2000 Entries
Silverline Chevrolet	Chevrolet Cruze	2	(United Kingdom) Jason Plato	All
Silverline Chevrolet	Chevrolet Cruze	20	(United Kingdom) Alex MacDowall	All
Honda Racing Team	Honda Civic	4	(United Kingdom) Matt Neal	All
Honda Racing Team	Honda Civic	52	(United Kingdom) Gordon Shedden	All
Independent Constructor S2000 Entries (LPG Turbo Engine)
Team Aon	Ford Focus ST LPG	21	(United Kingdom) Tom Onslow-Cole	All
Team Aon	Ford Focus ST LPG	23	(United Kingdom) Tom Chilton	All
Independent S2000 Entries (NGTC Engine)
Special Tuning UK	SEAT León	22	(United Kingdom) Tom Boardman	8
Special Tuning UK	SEAT León	88	(United Kingdom) Phil Glew	7
Pinkney Motorsport	Vauxhall Vectra	55	(United Kingdom) David Pinkney	All
Pirtek Racing	Vauxhall Vectra	77	(United Kingdom) Andrew Jordan	All
Independent S2000 Entries
Airwaves BMW	BMW 320si	5	(United Kingdom) Mat Jackson	All
Airwaves BMW	BMW 320si	11	(United Kingdom) Steven Kane	All
Airwaves BMW	BMW 320si	12	(United Kingdom) Ben Collins	10
WSR	BMW 320si	6	(United Kingdom) Rob Collard	All
WSR	BMW 320si	44	(United Kingdom) Andy Neate	All
Uniq Racing with Triple Eight	Vauxhall Vectra	14	(United Kingdom) James Nash	2–10
Uniq Racing with Triple Eight	Vauxhall Vectra	15	(United Kingdom) Jeff Smith	8
Uniq Racing with Triple Eight	Vauxhall Vectra	16	(United Kingdom) Sam Tordoff	10
Uniq Racing with Triple Eight	Vauxhall Vectra	25	(United Kingdom) Daniel Lloyd	5
Uniq Racing with Triple Eight	Vauxhall Vectra	88	(United Kingdom) Phil Glew	1
Uniq Racing with Triple Eight	Vauxhall Vectra	888	(Italy) Fabrizio Giovanardi	1
Special Tuning UK	SEAT León	22	(United Kingdom) Tom Boardman	1–7, 9–10
Forster Motorsport	BMW 320si	30	(United Kingdom) Martin Depper	3–7, 9–10
Forster Motorsport	BMW 320si	37	(United Kingdom) Arthur Forster	2–7, 9–10
AmD Milltek Racing.com	Volkswagen Golf	99	(United Kingdom) Shaun Hollamby	All
Independent BTC-T Entries
Boulevard Team Racing	Vauxhall Astra Coupé	27	(United Kingdom) Martin Johnson	1–7, 9–10
sunshine.co.uk with Tech-Speed Motorsport	Honda Integra Type-R	28	(United Kingdom) John George	All
sunshine.co.uk with Tech-Speed Motorsport	Honda Integra Type-R	29	(United Kingdom) Paul O'Neill	All
Central Group Racing	Honda Integra Type-R	43	(United Kingdom) Lea Wood	3–7, 9–10
WRC Developments with Barwell	Honda Integra Type-R	46	(United Kingdom) James Kaye	9–10
TH Motorsport	Honda Civic Type-R	98	(United Kingdom) Matt Hamilton	1–4

=== Team and driver changes ===
==== Team changes ====
- Vauxhall withdrew their manufacturer support from Triple Eight Race Engineering due to the economic crisis and the lack of official manufacturers in the BTCC. However, continued as a privateer team. RML gained the backing of Chevrolet to run a Works team in the series, while Honda returned as a manufacturer team with Team Dynamics.

==== Driver changes ====
Changed teams

- Rob Collard: Airwaves BMW → WSR
- John George: TH Motorsport → sunshine.co.uk with Tech-Speed Motorsport
- Mat Jackson: Racing Silverline → Airwaves BMW
- Andrew Jordan: VX Racing → Pirtek Racing
- James Nash: RML → Uniq Racing with Triple Eight
- Matt Neal: VX Racing → Honda Racing Team
- David Pinkney: Team Dynamics → Pinkney Motorsport

Entering/re-entering BTCC

- Tom Boardman: World Touring Car Championship (SUNRED Engineering) → Special Tuning UK
- Ben Collins: Le Mans Series (RML) → Airwaves BMW
- Martin Depper: Mini Challenge (Forster Motorsport) → Forster Motorsport
- Arthur Forster: Mini Challenge (Forster Motorsport) → Forster Motorsport
- Phil Glew: Renault Clio Cup UK (Team Pyro) → Uniq Racing with Triple Eight & Special Tuning UK
- Shaun Hollamby: Dunlop SportMaxx Cup (AmD Millteksport) → AmD Milltek Racing.com
- Steven Kane: FIA Formula Two Championship (test driver) → Airwaves BMW
- Alex MacDowall: Renault Clio Cup UK (Total Control Racing) → Silverline Chevrolet
- Andy Neate: Sabbatical (injury) → WSR
- Jeff Smith: Renault Clio Cup UK (Team Pyro) → Uniq Racing with Triple Eight
- Sam Tordoff: Renault Clio Cup UK (Total Control Racing) → Uniq Racing with Triple Eight
- Lea Wood: Welsh Sports and Saloon Car Championship (Team Wood Racing) → Central Group Racing

Leaving BTCC

- Jonathan Adam: Airwaves BMW → unknown
- Martyn Bell: Sunshine.co.uk with Tech-Speed → Sabbatical (injury)
- Dan Eaves: Clyde Valley Racing → unknown
- Johnny Herbert: Team Dynamics → Superstars Series (Motorzone)
- Stephen Jelley: West Surrey Racing → Porsche Carrera Cup Great Britain (Team Parker Racing)
- Adam Jones: Clyde Valley Racing → unknown
- Nick Leason: AFM Racing → unknown
- Liam McMillan: Maxtreme → unknown
- Alan Morrison: Team AON → unknown
- Anthony Reid: West Surrey Racing → Grand Prix Masters/World Sportscar Masters
- James Thompson: Team Dynamics → European Touring Car Cup & World Touring Car Championship (Hartmann Racing)
- Colin Turkington: West Surrey Racing → World Touring Car Championship (West Surrey Racing)
- Harry Vaulkhard: Bamboo Engineering → World Touring Car Championship (Bamboo Engineering)

Mid-season changes

- Phil Glew signed to race for Triple Eight shortly after the media day, but after competing at Thruxton he lost his drive when Uniq withdrew sponsorship from the team. He returned to the series in a second SEAT León run by Tom Boardman's Special Tuning UK team, under the YourRacingCar.com banner, at Silverstone, but the deal was for the single weekend.
- Fabrizio Giovanardi competed in the opening round for Triple Eight but left the team ahead of Rockingham due to lack of sponsorship.
- James Nash was signed by Triple Eight to be their sole representative from Rockingham onwards.
- Daniel Lloyd joined Triple Eight in a second car at Croft.
- Matt Hamilton withdrew from the round at Croft due to financial difficulties and missed the rest of the season.
- Jeff Smith joined Triple Eight in a second car at Knockhill.
- James Kaye returned to the series for the final two rounds after four years away, racing a Honda Integra under the 'WRC Developments with Barwell' banner.
- Sam Tordoff joined Triple Eight in a second car at the final round at Brands Hatch.
- Ben Collins joined Airwaves BMW in a third car at the final round at Brands Hatch.

== Calendar ==
All races were held in the United Kingdom. The calendar was announced by the championship organisers on 7 October 2009, with no major changes from 2009.

Round		Circuit	Date	Pole position	Fastest lap	Winning driver	Winning team
1	R1	Thruxton Circuit, Hampshire	4 April	(United Kingdom) Gordon Shedden	(United Kingdom) Gordon Shedden	(Italy) Fabrizio Giovanardi	Uniq Racing with Triple Eight
1	R2	Thruxton Circuit, Hampshire	4 April		(United Kingdom) Jason Plato	(Italy) Fabrizio Giovanardi	Uniq Racing with Triple Eight
1	R3	Thruxton Circuit, Hampshire	4 April		(United Kingdom) Rob Collard	(United Kingdom) Steven Kane	Airwaves BMW
2	R4	Rockingham Motor Speedway, Northamptonshire	25 April	(United Kingdom) Tom Chilton	(United Kingdom) Rob Collard	(United Kingdom) Matt Neal	Honda Racing Team
2	R5	Rockingham Motor Speedway, Northamptonshire	25 April		(United Kingdom) Jason Plato	(United Kingdom) Jason Plato	Silverline Chevrolet
2	R6	Rockingham Motor Speedway, Northamptonshire	25 April		(United Kingdom) Matt Neal	(United Kingdom) Matt Neal	Honda Racing Team
3	R7	Brands Hatch (GP), Kent	2 May	(United Kingdom) Tom Chilton	(United Kingdom) Tom Chilton	(United Kingdom) Tom Chilton	Team Aon
3	R8	Brands Hatch (GP), Kent	2 May		(United Kingdom) Matt Neal	(United Kingdom) Tom Onslow-Cole	Team Aon
3	R9	Brands Hatch (GP), Kent	2 May		(United Kingdom) Matt Neal	(United Kingdom) Mat Jackson	Airwaves BMW
4	R10	Oulton Park, Cheshire	6 June	(United Kingdom) Tom Onslow-Cole	(United Kingdom) Gordon Shedden	(United Kingdom) Tom Onslow-Cole	Team Aon
4	R11	Oulton Park, Cheshire	6 June		(United Kingdom) Jason Plato	(United Kingdom) Jason Plato	Silverline Chevrolet
4	R12	Oulton Park, Cheshire	6 June		(United Kingdom) Gordon Shedden	(United Kingdom) Matt Neal	Honda Racing Team
5	R13	Croft Circuit, North Yorkshire	20 June	(United Kingdom) Tom Chilton	(United Kingdom) Gordon Shedden	(United Kingdom) Gordon Shedden	Honda Racing Team
5	R14	Croft Circuit, North Yorkshire	20 June		(United Kingdom) Paul O'Neill	(United Kingdom) Gordon Shedden	Honda Racing Team
5	R15	Croft Circuit, North Yorkshire	20 June		(United Kingdom) Jason Plato	(United Kingdom) Andrew Jordan	Pirtek Racing
6	R16	Snetterton Motor Racing Circuit, Norfolk	8 August	(United Kingdom) Alex MacDowall	(United Kingdom) Jason Plato	(United Kingdom) Jason Plato	Silverline Chevrolet
6	R17	Snetterton Motor Racing Circuit, Norfolk	8 August		(United Kingdom) Jason Plato	(United Kingdom) Jason Plato	Silverline Chevrolet
6	R18	Snetterton Motor Racing Circuit, Norfolk	8 August		(United Kingdom) Tom Onslow-Cole	(United Kingdom) Gordon Shedden	Honda Racing Team
7	R19	Silverstone Circuit, Northamptonshire	22 August	(United Kingdom) Tom Onslow-Cole	(United Kingdom) Tom Onslow-Cole	(United Kingdom) Tom Chilton	Team Aon
7	R20	Silverstone Circuit, Northamptonshire	22 August		(United Kingdom) Tom Onslow-Cole	(United Kingdom) Tom Chilton	Team Aon
7	R21	Silverstone Circuit, Northamptonshire	22 August		(United Kingdom) Tom Onslow-Cole	(United Kingdom) Tom Onslow-Cole	Team Aon
8	R22	Knockhill Racing Circuit, Fife	5 September	(United Kingdom) Alex MacDowall	(United Kingdom) Alex MacDowall	(United Kingdom) Gordon Shedden	Honda Racing Team
8	R23	Knockhill Racing Circuit, Fife	5 September		(United Kingdom) Tom Chilton	(United Kingdom) Matt Neal	Honda Racing Team
8	R24	Knockhill Racing Circuit, Fife	5 September		(United Kingdom) Paul O'Neill	(United Kingdom) Jason Plato	Silverline Chevrolet
9	R25	Donington Park, Leicestershire	19 September	(United Kingdom) Tom Chilton	(United Kingdom) Tom Chilton	(United Kingdom) Gordon Shedden	Honda Racing Team
9	R26	Donington Park, Leicestershire	19 September		(United Kingdom) Jason Plato	(United Kingdom) Tom Onslow-Cole	Team Aon
9	R27	Donington Park, Leicestershire	19 September		(United Kingdom) Jason Plato	(United Kingdom) Matt Neal	Honda Racing Team
10	R28	Brands Hatch (Indy), Kent	10 October	(United Kingdom) Jason Plato	(United Kingdom) Jason Plato	(United Kingdom) Jason Plato	Silverline Chevrolet
10	R29	Brands Hatch (Indy), Kent	10 October		(United Kingdom) Rob Collard	(United Kingdom) Jason Plato	Silverline Chevrolet
10	R30	Brands Hatch (Indy), Kent	10 October		(United Kingdom) Mat Jackson	(United Kingdom) Andrew Jordan	Pirtek Racing

== Championship standings ==
Points system
**1st**	**2nd**	**3rd**	**4th**	**5th**	**6th**	**7th**	**8th**	**9th**	**10th**	Fastest lap	Lead a lap
15	12	10	8	6	5	4	3	2	1	1	1

- No driver may collect more than one "Lead a Lap" point per race no matter how many laps they lead.
- Race 1 polesitter receives 1 point.

=== Drivers Championship ===
(key)

Pos	Driver	THR			ROC			BHGP			OUL			CRO			SNE			SIL			KNO			DON			BHI			Pts
1	(United Kingdom) Jason Plato	2	4	3	3	1*	5	8	Ret	Ret	10	1*	6	3	3	16	1*	**1***	5	3	4	9	6	3	1*	Ret	3	3	**1***	**1***	9	260
2	(United Kingdom) Matt Neal	12	2	Ret	1*	**9**	**1***	5	Ret	2	8	2	1*	4	2*	Ret	Ret	9	3	8	5	4	4	1*	3	5	8	1*	3	2	Ret	229
3	(United Kingdom) Gordon Shedden	**Ret***	11	4	2	13	Ret	2	2*	9	2	Ret	10	1*	**1***	9	4	8	1*	10	7	5	1*	**2***	9	1*	**2***	6	2	NC	8	218
4	(United Kingdom) Tom Onslow-Cole	13	12	7	8	7	7	3	1*	10	**1***	**3***	5	8	5	2	6	3	16	**2***	3*	1*	7	7	**2***	8*	1*	9	Ret	Ret	Ret	200
5	(United Kingdom) Tom Chilton	Ret	Ret	8	**11**	6	Ret	**1***	**DSQ**	6	5	6	4	**18**	11	4	3	2	4	1*	**1***	6	5	4	10	**2**	4	5	7	5	3	191
6	(United Kingdom) Steven Kane	NC	8	1*	5	3	3	11	7	**3**	6	5	2	11	Ret	3	7	4	6	9	8	7	3	5	Ret	6	6	4	11	6	2	169
7	(United Kingdom) Mat Jackson	3	5	2	13	4	Ret	10	11	1*	4	4	7	9	Ret	7	2	5	7	13	10	3	10	6	5	3	5	8	13	8	4	155
8	(United Kingdom) Rob Collard	Ret	9	**Ret***	10	2	6	4	12	4	3	15	8	2	8	17	10	7	2	6	2	12	Ret	Ret	6	16	7	2	5	3	6	144
9	(United Kingdom) Paul O'Neill	4	3	6	6	8	2	6	4	Ret	Ret	Ret	9	5	4	5	11	Ret	8	7	6	**2***	8	10	4	Ret	12	Ret	6	4	5	136
10	(United Kingdom) Andrew Jordan	14	15	14	7	5	4	Ret	5	5	Ret	16	Ret	10	7	**1***	9	6	Ret	5	17	Ret	9	8	8	Ret	9	**7***	9	7	**1***	101
11	(United Kingdom) Alex MacDowall	7	6	9	12	12	Ret	7	3	Ret	7	9	**Ret***	13	9	10	**NC**	Ret	13	4	9	10	**2**	9	7	4	11	Ret	4	Ret	11	83
12	(United Kingdom) James Nash				Ret	10	8	Ret	10	7	9	7	3	6	13	11	5	10	**Ret***	11	11	8	Ret	11	11	17	10	10	8	9	7	52
13	(United Kingdom) Tom Boardman	5	16	13	4	Ret	10	9	6	8*	Ret	8	Ret*	12	6	6	8	Ret	11	12	12	Ret	Ret	14	Ret	7	13	Ret	10	13	Ret	48
14	(Italy) Fabrizio Giovanardi	1*	**1***	5																												38
15	(United Kingdom) David Pinkney	8	10	10	18	16	Ret	Ret	8	Ret	Ret	10	11	Ret	DNS	Ret	Ret	11	9	Ret	Ret	11	11	Ret	Ret	10	18	13	DNS	DNS	DNS	12
16	(United Kingdom) Phil Glew	6	7	Ret																14	13	13										9
17	(United Kingdom) Daniel Lloyd													7	14	8																7
18	(United Kingdom) Andy Neate	10	14	11	Ret	11	9	14	Ret	13	11	17	DSQ	17	10	Ret	13	13	10	15	Ret	14	12	12	13	15	15	Ret	12	10	12	6
19	(United Kingdom) Martin Johnson	11	19	Ret	9	15	11	Ret	Ret	DNS	15	NC	14	16	15	Ret	Ret	12	DNS	18	16	15				11	Ret	DNS	18	DNS	15	2
20	(United Kingdom) John George	9	17	Ret	16	Ret	15	Ret	DNS	Ret	12	Ret	DNS	15	Ret	12	12	Ret	12	17	14	Ret	Ret	13	12	12	16	12	19	14	14	2
21	(United Kingdom) Matt Hamilton	Ret	13	12	15	14	12	12	9	12	Ret	12	13																			2
22	(United Kingdom) James Kaye																									9	14	Ret	16	Ret	Ret	2
23	(United Kingdom) Sam Tordoff																												17	11	10	1
24	(United Kingdom) Lea Wood							13	Ret	11	13	11	12	Ret	17	13	14	14	Ret	16	Ret	Ret				13	17	11	15	15	Ret	0
25	(United Kingdom) Martin Depper							15	Ret	14	14	14	Ret	14	12	Ret	15	16	Ret	20	15	Ret				DNS	DNS	DNS	Ret	Ret	13	0
26	(United Kingdom) Ben Collins																												14	12	Ret	0
27	(United Kingdom) Arthur Forster				17	17	13	Ret	Ret	15	16	13	15	NC	Ret	15	17	Ret	14	19	Ret	16				18	20	14	20	16	Ret	0
28	(United Kingdom) Shaun Hollamby	Ret	18	Ret	14	Ret	14	Ret	Ret	DNS	NC	Ret	Ret	Ret	16	14	16	15	15	DNS	DNS	DNS	13	16	15	14	19	Ret	21	17	Ret	0
29	(United Kingdom) Jeff Smith																						14	15	14							0
Pos	Driver	THR			ROC			BHGP			OUL			CRO			SNE			SIL			KNO			DON			BHI			Pts
Sources:

- Note: **bold** signifies pole position (1 point given in first race only, and race 2 and 3 poles are based on race results), italics signifies fastest lap (1 point given all races) and * signifies at least one lap in the lead (1 point given all races).

=== Manufacturers/Constructors Championship ===
Pos	Manufacturer/Constructor	THR			ROC			BHGP			OUL			CRO			SNE			SIL			KNO			DON			BHI			Pts
1	Honda / Honda Racing Team	12	2	4	1	9	1	2	2	2	2	2	1	1	1	9	4	8	1	8	5	4	1	1	3	1	2	1	2	2	8	546
1	Honda / Honda Racing Team	Ret	11	Ret	2	13	Ret	5	Ret	9	8	Ret	10	4	2	Ret	Ret	9	3	10	7	5	4	2	9	5	8	6	3	NC	Ret	546
2	Ford / Team Aon	13	12	7	8	6	7	1	1	6	1	3	4	8	5	2	3	2	4	1	1	1	5	4	2	2	1	5	7	5	3	522
2	Ford / Team Aon	Ret	Ret	8	11	7	Ret	3	DSQ	10	5	6	5	18	11	4	6	3	16	2	3	6	7	7	10	8	4	9	Ret	Ret	Ret	522
3	Chevrolet / Silverline Chevrolet	2	4	3	3	1	5	7	3	Ret	7	1	6	3	3	10	1	1	5	3	4	9	2	3	1	4	3	3	1	1	9	466
3	Chevrolet / Silverline Chevrolet	7	6	9	12	12	Ret	8	Ret	Ret	10	9	Ret	13	9	16	NC	Ret	13	4	9	10	6	9	7	Ret	11	Ret	4	Ret	11	466
Pos	Manufacturer/Constructor	THR			ROC			BHGP			OUL			CRO			SNE			SIL			KNO			DON			BHI			Pts

=== Teams Championship ===
Pos	Team	THR			ROC			BHGP			OUL			CRO			SNE			SIL			KNO			DON			BHI			Pts
1	Honda Racing Team	12	2	4	1	9	1	2	2	2	2	2	1	1	1	9	4	8	1	8	5	4	1	1	3	1	2	1	2	2	8	424
1	Honda Racing Team	Ret	11	Ret	2	13	Ret	5	Ret	9	8	Ret	10	4	2	Ret	Ret	9	3	10	7	5	4	2	9	5	8	6	3	NC	Ret	424
2	Team Aon	13	12	7	8	6	7	1	1	6	1	3	4	8	5	2	3	2	4	1	1	1	5	4	2	2	1	5	7	5	3	366
2	Team Aon	Ret	Ret	8	11	7	Ret	3	DSQ	10	5	6	5	18	11	4	6	3	16	2	3	6	7	7	10	8	4	9	Ret	Ret	Ret	366
3	Silverline Chevrolet	2	4	3	3	1	5	7	3	Ret	7	1	6	3	3	10	1	1	5	3	4	9	2	3	1	4	3	3	1	1	9	322
3	Silverline Chevrolet	7	6	9	12	12	Ret	8	Ret	Ret	10	9	Ret	13	9	16	NC	Ret	13	4	9	10	6	9	7	Ret	11	Ret	4	Ret	11	322
4	Airwaves BMW	3	5	1	5	3	3	10	7	1	4	4	2	9	Ret	3	2	4	6	9	8	3	3	5	5	3	5	4	11	6	2	321
4	Airwaves BMW	NC	8	2	13	4	Ret	11	11	3	6	5	7	11	Ret	7	7	5	7	13	10	7	10	6	Ret	6	6	8	13	8	4	321
5	WSR	10	9	11	10	2	6	4	12	4	3	15	8	2	8	17	10	7	2	6	2	12	12	12	6	15	7	2	5	3	6	146
5	WSR	Ret	14	Ret	Ret	11	9	14	Ret	13	11	17	DSQ	15	10	Ret	13	13	10	15	Ret	14	Ret	Ret	13	16	15	Ret	12	10	12	146
6	sunshine.co.uk with Tech-Speed Motorsport	4	3	6	6	8	2	6	4	Ret	12	Ret	9	5	4	5	11	Ret	8	7	6	2	8	10	4	12	12	12	6	4	5	135
6	sunshine.co.uk with Tech-Speed Motorsport	9	17	Ret	16	Ret	15	Ret	DNS	Ret	Ret	Ret	DNS	15	Ret	12	12	Ret	12	17	14	Ret	Ret	13	12	Ret	16	Ret	19	14	14	135
7	Uniq Racing with Triple Eight	1	1	5	Ret	10	8	Ret	10	7	9	7	3	6	13	8	5	10	Ret	11	11	8	14	11	11	17	10	10	8	9	7	104
7	Uniq Racing with Triple Eight	6	7	Ret										7	14	11							Ret	15	14				17	11	10	104
8	Pirtek Racing	14	15	14	7	5	4	Ret	5	5	Ret	16	Ret	10	7	1	9	6	Ret	5	18	Ret	9	8	8	Ret	9	7	9	7	1	98
9	Special Tuning UK	5	16	13	4	Ret	10	9	6	8	Ret	8	Ret	12	6	6	8	Ret	11	12	12	13	Ret	14	Ret	7	13	Ret	10	13	Ret	46
9	Special Tuning UK																			14	13	Ret										46
10	Pinkney Motorsport	8	10	10	18	16	Ret	Ret	8	Ret	Ret	10	11	Ret	DNS	Ret	Ret	11	9	Ret	Ret	11	11	Ret	Ret	10	18	13	DNS	DNS	DNS	12
11	Boulevard Team Racing	11	19	Ret	9	15	11	Ret	Ret	DNS	15	NC	14	16	15	Ret	Ret	12	DNS	18	16	15				11	Ret	DNS	18	DNS	15	2
12	TH Motorsport	Ret	13	12	15	14	12	12	9	12	Ret	12	13																			2
13	WRC Developments with Barwell																									9	14	Ret	16	Ret	Ret	2
14	Central Group Racing							13	Ret	11	13	11	12	Ret	17	13	14	14	Ret	16	Ret	Ret				13	17	11	15	15	Ret	0
15	Forster Motorsport				17	17	13	15	Ret	14	14	13	15	14	12	15	15	16	14	19	15	16				18	20	14	20	16	13	0
15	Forster Motorsport							Ret	Ret	15	16	14	Ret	NC	Ret	Ret	17	Ret	Ret	20	Ret	Ret				DNS	DNS	DNS	Ret	Ret	Ret	0
16	AmD Milltek Racing.com	Ret	18	Ret	14	Ret	14	Ret	Ret	DNS	NC	Ret	Ret	Ret	16	14	16	15	15	DNS	DNS	DNS	13	16	15	14	19	Ret	21	17	Ret	0
Pos	Team	THR			ROC			BHGP			OUL			CRO			SNE			SIL			KNO			DON			BHI			Pts

=== Independents Trophy ===
Pos	Driver	THR			ROC			BHGP			OUL			CRO			SNE			SIL			KNO			DON			BHI			Pts
1	(United Kingdom) Tom Chilton	Ret	Ret	8	**11**	6	Ret	**1**	**DSQ**	6	5	6	4	**18**	11	4	**3**	2	4	1	**1**	6	5	4	10	**2**	**4**	5	**7**	5	3	249
2	(United Kingdom) Steven Kane	NC	8	1	5	3	3	11	7	**3**	6	5	2	11	Ret	3	7	4	6	9	8	7	**3**	**5**	Ret	6	6	4	11	6	2	247
3	(United Kingdom) Tom Onslow-Cole	13	12	7	8	7	7	3	1	10	**1**	**3**	5	8	5	2	6	3	16	**2**	3	1	7	7	**2**	8	1	9	Ret	Ret	Ret	241
4	(United Kingdom) Mat Jackson	3	5	2	13	4	Ret	10	11	1	4	4	7	9	Ret	7	2	**5**	7	13	10	3	10	6	5	3	5	8	13	8	4	221
5	(United Kingdom) Paul O'Neill	4	3	6	6	8	**2**	6	4	Ret	Ret	Ret	9	5	4	5	11	Ret	8	7	6	**2**	8	10	4	Ret	12	Ret	6	4	5	208
6	(United Kingdom) Rob Collard	Ret	9	**Ret**	10	2	6	4	12	4	3	15	8	2	**8**	17	10	7	2	6	2	12	Ret	Ret	6	16	7	2	5	**3**	6	201
7	(United Kingdom) Andrew Jordan	14	15	14	7	5	4	Ret	5	5	Ret	16	Ret	10	7	**1**	9	6	Ret	5	18	Ret	9	8	8	Ret	9	**7**	9	7	**1**	149
8	(United Kingdom) James Nash				Ret	10	8	Ret	10	7	9	7	3	6	13	11	5	10	**Ret**	11	11	8	Ret	11	11	17	10	10	8	9	7	112
9	(United Kingdom) Tom Boardman	5	16	13	4	**Ret**	10	9	6	8	Ret	8	**Ret**	12	6	6	8	Ret	11	12	12	Ret	Ret	14	Ret	7	13	Ret	10	13	Ret	97
10	(United Kingdom) David Pinkney	8	10	10	18	16	Ret	Ret	8	Ret	Ret	10	11	Ret	DNS	Ret	Ret	11	9	Ret	Ret	11	11	Ret	Ret	10	18	13	DNS	DNS	DNS	46
11	(United Kingdom) Andy Neate	10	14	11	Ret	11	9	14	Ret	13	11	17	DSQ	17	10	Ret	13	13	10	15	Ret	14	12	12	13	15	15	Ret	12	10	12	45
12	(Italy) Fabrizio Giovanardi	**1**	**1**	5																												40
13	(United Kingdom) John George	9	17	Ret	16	Ret	15	Ret	DNS	Ret	12	Ret	DNS	15	Ret	12	12	Ret	12	17	14	Ret	Ret	13	12	12	16	12	19	14	14	21
14	(United Kingdom) Phil Glew	6	7	Ret																14	13	13										19
15	(United Kingdom) Matt Hamilton	Ret	13	12	15	14	12	12	9	12	Ret	12	13																			17
16	(United Kingdom) Lea Wood							13	Ret	11	13	11	12	Ret	17	13	14	14	Ret	16	Ret	Ret				13	17	11	15	15	Ret	15
17	(United Kingdom) Martin Johnson	11	19	Ret	9	15	11	Ret	Ret	DNS	15	NC	14	16	15	Ret	Ret	12	DNS	18	16	15				11	Ret	DNS	18	DNS	15	14
18	(United Kingdom) Daniel Lloyd													7	14	8																12
19	(United Kingdom) James Kaye																									9	14	Ret	16	Ret	Ret	6
20	(United Kingdom) Martin Depper							15	Ret	14	14	14	Ret	14	12	Ret	15	16	Ret	20	15	Ret				DNS	DNS	DNS	Ret	Ret	13	6
21	(United Kingdom) Sam Tordoff																												17	11	10	5
22	(United Kingdom) Shaun Hollamby	Ret	18	Ret	14	Ret	14	Ret	Ret	DNS	NC	Ret	Ret	Ret	16	14	16	15	15	DNS	DNS	DNS	13	16	15	14	19	Ret	21	17	Ret	3
23	(United Kingdom) Ben Collins																												14	12	Ret	2
24	(United Kingdom) Arthur Forster				17	17	13	Ret	Ret	15	16	13	15	NC	Ret	15	17	Ret	14	19	Ret	16				18	20	14	20	16	Ret	2
25	(United Kingdom) Jeff Smith																						14	15	14							2
Pos	Driver	THR			ROC			BHGP			OUL			CRO			SNE			SIL			KNO			DON			BHI			Pts

=== Independent Teams Trophy ===
Pos	Team	THR			ROC			BHGP			OUL			CRO			SNE			SIL			KNO			DON			BHI			Pts
1	Team Aon	13	12	7	8	6	7	1	1	6	1	3	4	8	5	2	3	2	4	1	1	1	5	4	2	2	1	5	7	5	3	342
2	Airwaves BMW	3	5	1	5	3	3	10	7	1	4	4	2	9	Ret	3	2	4	6	9	8	3	3	5	5	3	5	4	11	6	2	311
3	WSR	10	9	11	10	2	6	4	12	4	3	15	8	2	8	17	10	7	2	6	2	12	12	12	6	15	7	2	5	3	6	250
4	sunshine.co.uk with Tech-Speed Motorsport	4	3	6	6	8	2	6	4	Ret	12	Ret	9	5	4	5	11	Ret	8	7	6	2	8	10	4	12	12	12	6	4	5	249
5	Uniq Racing with Triple Eight	1	1	5	Ret	10	8	Ret	10	7	9	7	3	6	13	8	5	10	Ret	11	11	8	14	11	11	17	10	10	8	9	7	189
6	Pirtek Racing	14	15	14	7	5	4	Ret	5	5	Ret	16	Ret	10	7	1	9	6	Ret	5	18	Ret	9	8	8	Ret	9	7	9	7	1	181
7	Special Tuning UK	5	16	13	4	Ret	10	9	6	8	Ret	8	Ret	12	6	6	8	Ret	11	12	12	13	Ret	14	Ret	7	13	Ret	10	13	Ret	134
8	Pinkney Motorsport	8	10	10	18	16	Ret	Ret	8	Ret	Ret	10	11	Ret	DNS	Ret	Ret	11	9	Ret	Ret	11	11	Ret	Ret	10	18	13	DNS	DNS	DNS	69
9	Central Group Racing							13	Ret	11	13	11	12	Ret	17	13	14	14	Ret	16	Ret	Ret				13	17	11	15	15	Ret	52
10	Forster Motorsport				17	17	13	15	Ret	14	14	13	15	14	12	15	15	16	14	19	15	16				18	20	14	20	16	13	48
11	Boulevard Team Racing	11	19	Ret	9	15	11	Ret	Ret	DNS	15	NC	14	16	15	Ret	Ret	12	DNS	18	16	15				11	Ret	DNS	18	DNS	15	46
12	TH Motorsport	Ret	13	12	15	14	12	12	9	12	Ret	12	13																			35
13	AmD Milltek Racing.com	Ret	18	Ret	14	Ret	14	Ret	Ret	DNS	NC	Ret	Ret	Ret	16	14	16	15	15	DNS	DNS	DNS	13	16	15	14	19	Ret	21	17	Ret	29
14	WRC Developments with Barwell																									9	14	Ret	16	Ret	Ret	13
Pos	Team	THR			ROC			BHGP			OUL			CRO			SNE			SIL			KNO			DON			BHI			Pts
