= Arthur Forster =

British racing driver (born 1967)

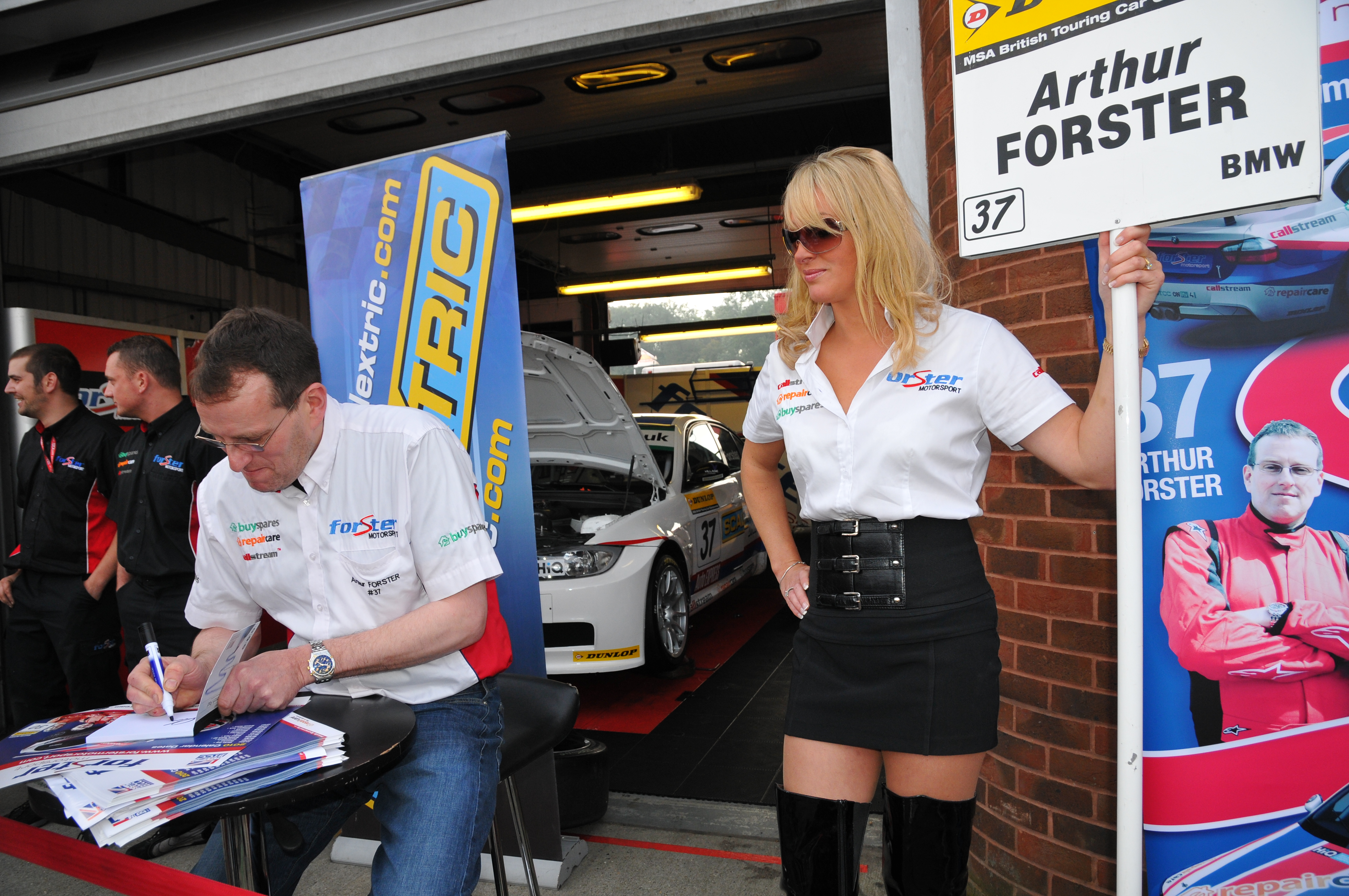
- Forster at Brands Hatch in 2010
- Nationality: British
- Born: 3 August 1967 (age 59) Newcastle, England

Previous series
- 2002–2009, 2011–2012 2010 2005–07 1994: Mini Challenge UK; British Touring Car Championship; Britcar; Ford Fiesta Challenge

Championship titles
- 2005: Mini Challenge

Arthur Forster (born 3 August 1967) is a British racing driver who last competed in the 2012 Mini Challenge UK with his own Forster Motorsport team, and competed in the 2010 British Touring Car Championship for them.

== Racing career ==
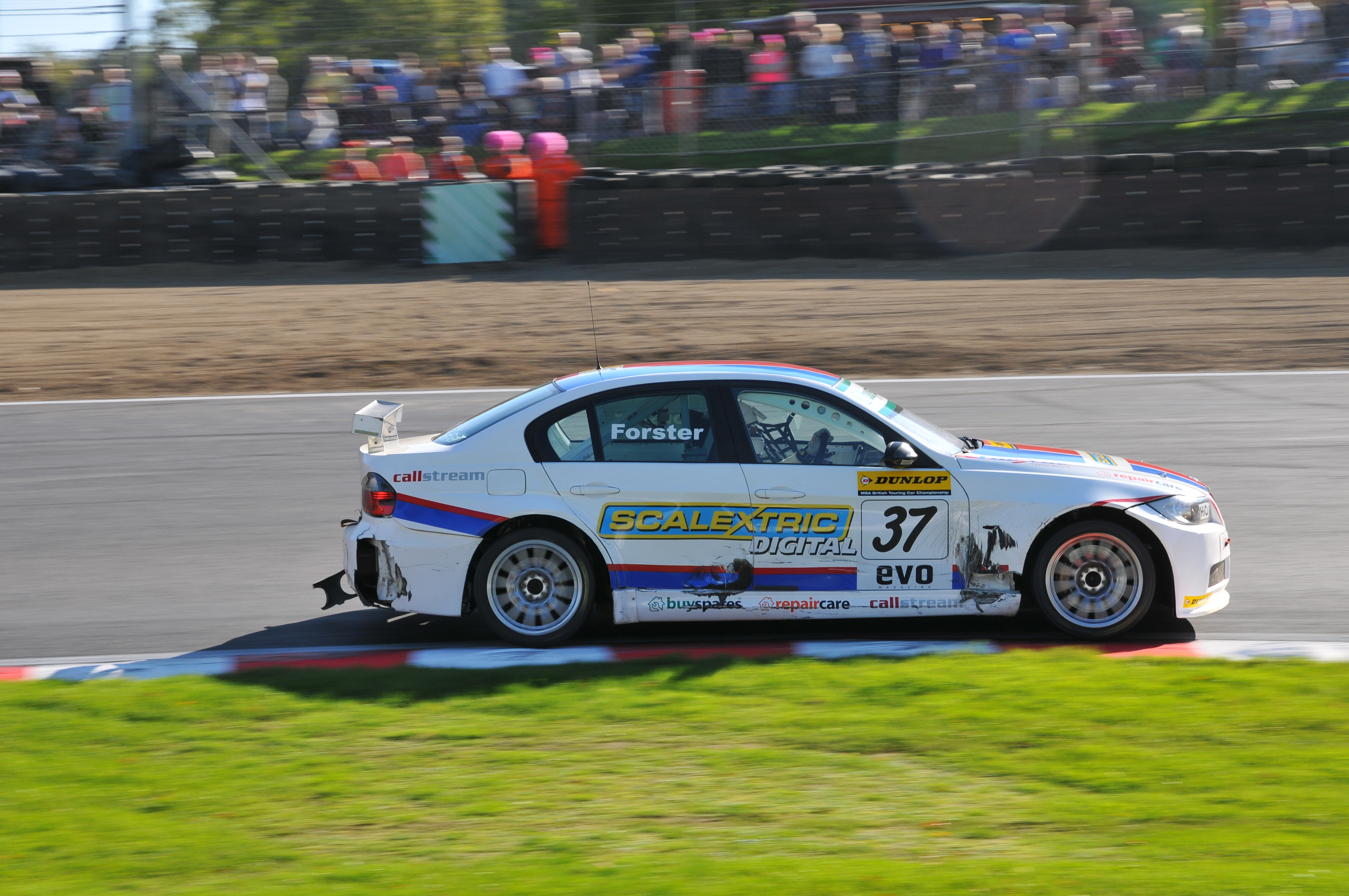
Forster competing at Brands Hatch during the 2010 British Touring Car Championship season.

Forster competed in karting at club level in the 1980s. In 1994, he competed in the Ford Fiesta Challenge as a privateer. In 2002, he stepped up to the Mini Challenge, finishing second in 2004 before becoming champion in 2005. He was second outright again in 2006. He also competed in Britcar between 2005 and 2007 in a self-built Mini, winning a race outright at Snetterton in 2005. He also competed in the Silverstone 24 Hours with just one teammate after third driver and popstar Chris Rea withdrew due to illness.

In 2010, Forster Motorsport stepped up to the British Touring Car Championship, entering two BMW 320si cars, formerly driven by Mat Jackson, to be driven by Forster and teammate Martin Depper.

== Racing record ==
=== Complete British Touring Car Championship results ===
(key) (Races in bold indicate pole position – 1 point awarded just in first race) (Races in italics indicate fastest lap – 1 point awarded all races) (* signifies that driver lead race for at least one lap – 1 point awarded all races)

Year	Team	Car	1	2	3	4	5	6	7	8	9	10	11	12	13	14	15	16	17	18	19	20	21	22	23	24	25	26	27	28	29	30	DC	Pts
2010	Forster Motorsport	BMW 320si	THR; 1	THR; 2	THR; 3	ROC; 1; 17	ROC; 2; 17	ROC; 3; 13	BRH; 1 Ret	BRH; 2 Ret	BRH; 3; 15	OUL; 1; 16	OUL; 2; 13	OUL; 3; 15	CRO; 1 NC	CRO; 2 Ret	CRO; 3; 15	SNE; 1; 17	SNE; 2 Ret	SNE; 3; 14	SIL; 1; 19	SIL; 2 Ret	SIL; 3; 16	KNO; 1	KNO; 2	KNO; 3	DON; 1; 18	DON; 2; 20	DON; 3; 14	BRH; 1; 20	BRH; 2; 16	BRH; 3 Ret	27th	0
