= Martin Depper =

British racing driver and businessman (born 1968)

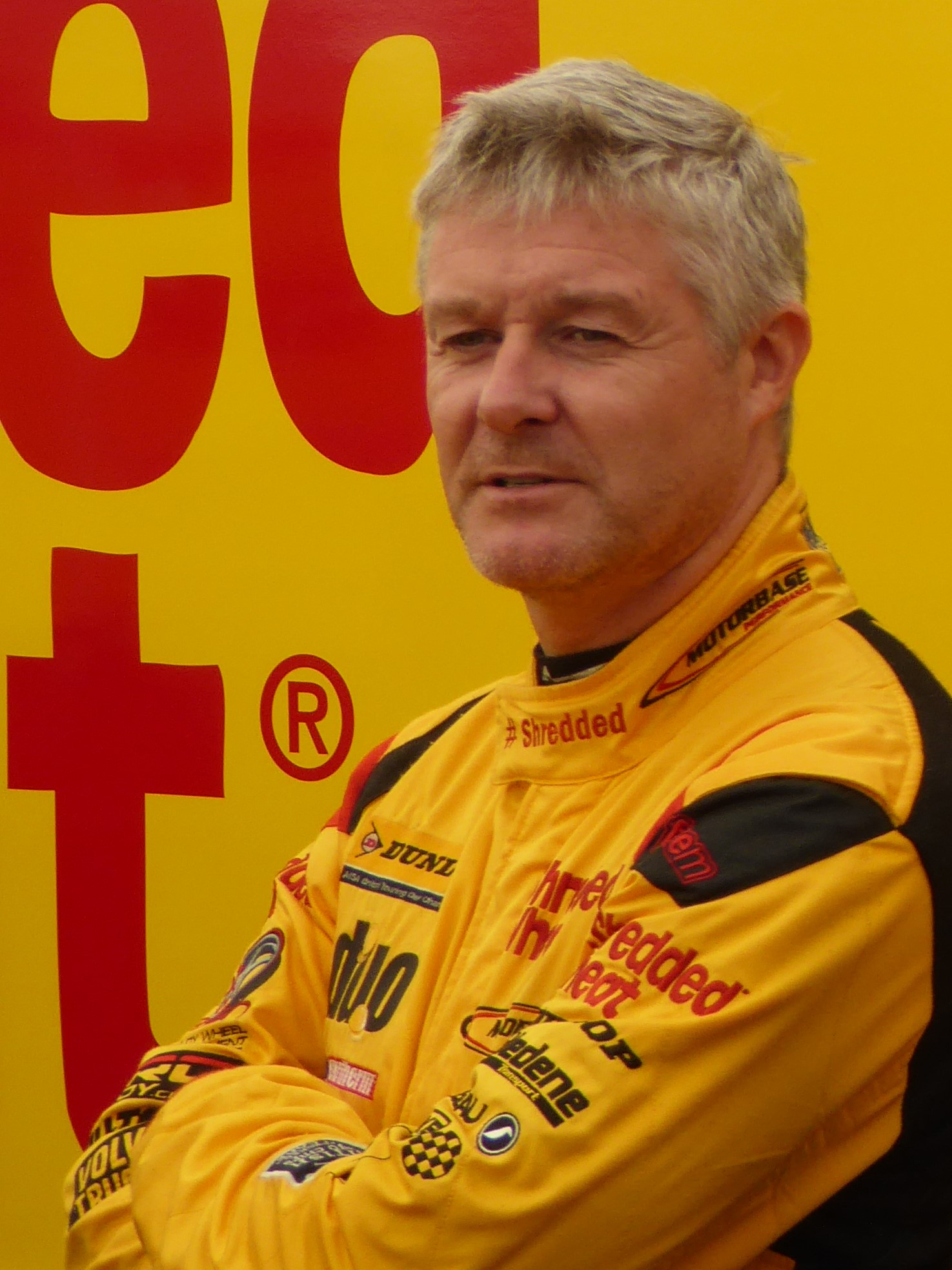
- Depper in 2017
- Nationality: (United Kingdom) British
- Born: Martin Lee Depper; 5 July 1968 (age 58) Kings Norton (England)

Volkswagen Racing Cup career
- Debut season: 2012
- Current team: DW Racing
- Car number: 30
- Former teams: KPM
- Starts: 27
- Wins: 6
- Poles: 1
- Fastest laps: 5
- Best finish: 4th in 2013

Previous series
- 2010, 2014–17 2009 2005–09: British Touring Car Championship; Mini Challenge Germany; Mini Challenge UK

Championship titles
- 2008: Mini Challenge UK

Martin Lee Depper (born 5 July 1968) is a British racing driver and businessman. He previously competed in the British Touring Car Championship.

Depper was the 2008 Mini Challenge UK Champion with Forster Motorsport. In 2013, he competed in the VW Cup, racing for KPM.

== Racing career ==
Born in Kings Norton, West Midlands, Depper first started competitive racing in 2005, initially in the Mini Challenge Cooper Class. After finishing third in Club Class in his second season, he finished third outright in the Senior Class in 2007 for Forster Motorsport, and won the drivers title outright in 2008. In 2009, he finished in fourth place overall with three race wins.

In 2010, Forster Motorsport stepped up to the British Touring Car Championship, entering two BMW 320si cars to be driven by Depper alongside Arthur Forster.

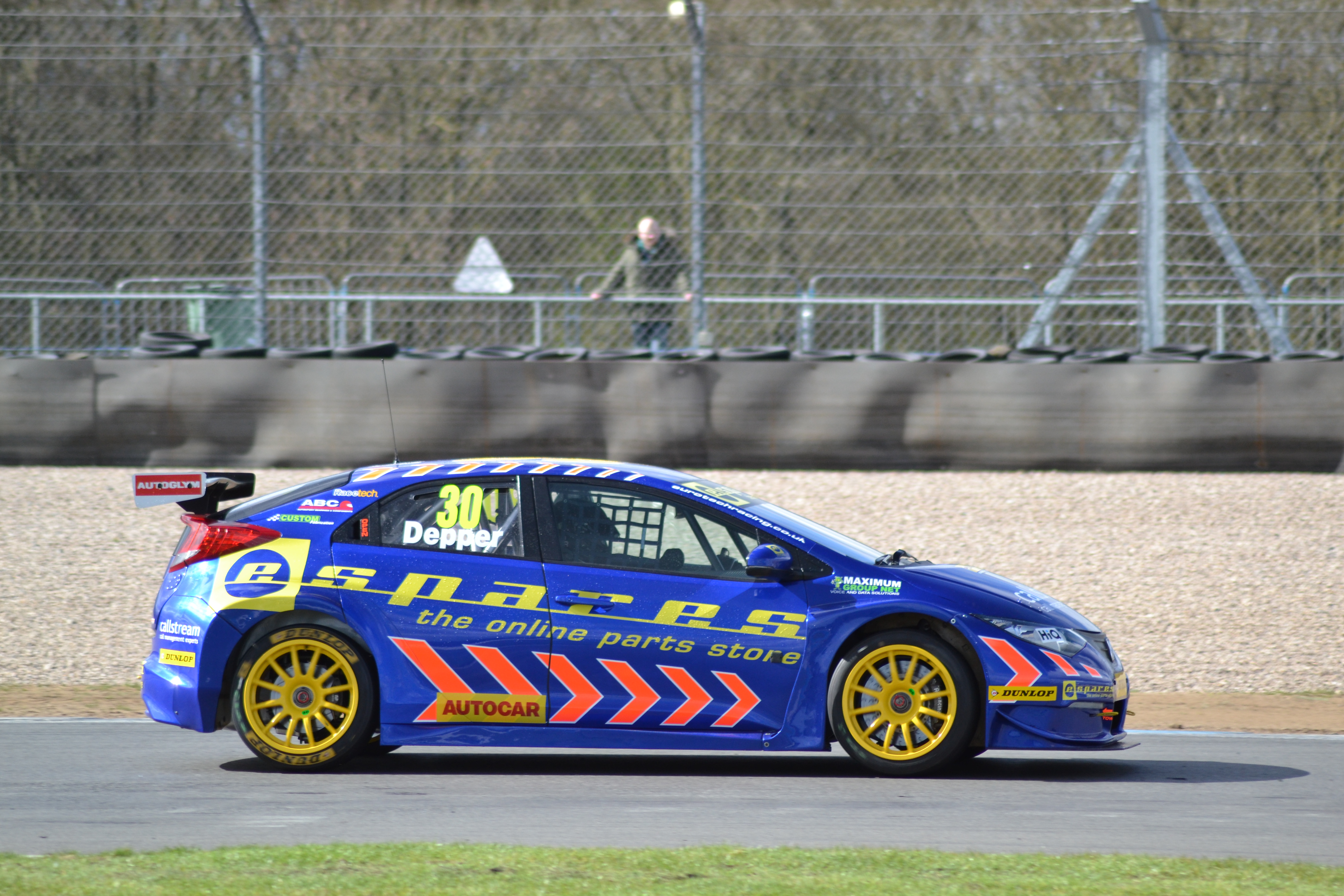
Depper driving the Pirtek Racing Honda Civic at Donington Park during the 2014 British Touring Car Championship season.

In 2013, Depper competed in the VW Cup, racing for KPM. In 2014, Depper returned to the BTCC with Eurotech Racing, driving a Honda Civic alongside Andrew Jordan, achieving a best finish of 12th in two rounds. In 2015, Depper continued with Eurotech, achieving a best result of ninth and 18th in the championship.

2016 saw Depper remain with Eurotech in the British Touring Car Championship, driving the new Type R Honda Civic, achieving a career best finish of fifth at Thruxton. In 2017, he moved to Motorbase Performance, driving a Ford Focus ST teammates with Mat Jackson and Rory Butcher. Depper secured fastest lap at Brands in the last race of the year. It was announced upon the unveiling of entrants for the 2018 season that Depper would not be returning to the BTCC. He is currently competing in the VW Cup with Maximum Motorsport.

== Business career ==
Depper is a director of several businesses, primarily in the appliance parts industry, which were founded by his father, Michael Depper.

== Racing record ==
=== Complete British Touring Car Championship results ===
(key) (Races in bold indicate pole position – 1 point awarded just in first race; races in italics indicate fastest lap – 1 point awarded all races; * signifies that driver lead race for at least one lap – 1 point awarded all races)

Year	Team	Car	1	2	3	4	5	6	7	8	9	10	11	12	13	14	15	16	17	18	19	20	21	22	23	24	25	26	27	28	29	30	DC	Pts
2010	Forster Motorsport	BMW 320si	THR; 1	THR; 2	THR; 3	ROC; 1	ROC; 2	ROC; 3	BRH; 1; 15	BRH; 2 Ret	BRH; 3; 14	OUL; 1; 14	OUL; 2; 14	OUL; 3 Ret	CRO; 1; 14	CRO; 2; 12	CRO; 3 Ret	SNE; 1; 15	SNE; 2; 16	SNE; 3 Ret	SIL; 1; 20	SIL; 2; 15	SIL; 3 Ret	KNO; 1	KNO; 2	KNO; 3	DON; 1 DNS	DON; 2 DNS	DON; 3 DNS	BRH; 1 Ret	BRH; 2 Ret	BRH; 3; 13	25th	0
2014	Pirtek Racing	Honda Civic	BRH; 1 DSQ	BRH; 2 Ret	BRH; 3 Ret	DON; 1; 20	DON; 2; 22	DON; 3; 16	THR; 1 Ret	THR; 2; 19	THR; 3; 18	OUL; 1 Ret	OUL; 2 Ret	OUL; 3; 16	CRO; 1; 14	CRO; 2; 17	CRO; 3; 13	SNE; 1; 17	SNE; 2; 12	SNE; 3 Ret	KNO; 1; 17	KNO; 2 Ret	KNO; 3; 20	ROC; 1; 19	ROC; 2; 12	ROC; 3; 19	SIL; 1; 18	SIL; 2 Ret	SIL; 3; 24	BRH; 1; 17	BRH; 2; 15	BRH; 3 Ret	23rd	14
2015	Eurotech Racing	Honda Civic	BRH; 1; 16	BRH; 2 Ret	BRH; 3; 13	DON; 1; 15	DON; 2; 19	DON; 3; 9	THR; 1; 12	THR; 2; 13	THR; 3; 15	OUL; 1; 14	OUL; 2; 14	OUL; 3 DNS	CRO; 1; 14	CRO; 2 Ret	CRO; 3; 17	SNE; 1; 17	SNE; 2 Ret	SNE; 3; 15	KNO; 1; 14	KNO; 2; 11	KNO; 3; 10	ROC; 1; 14	ROC; 2; 18	ROC; 3; 11	SIL; 1; 13	SIL; 2; 15	SIL; 3; 14	BRH; 1; 15	BRH; 2 Ret	BRH; 3; 19	18th	53
2016	Eurotech Racing	Honda Civic Type R	BRH; 1; 19	BRH; 2; 22	BRH; 3; 24	DON; 1 Ret	DON; 2; 17	DON; 3; 11	THR; 1; 5	THR; 2 Ret	THR; 3; 12	OUL; 1; 14	OUL; 2; 14	OUL; 3; 15	CRO; 1; 18	CRO; 2; 28	CRO; 3; 16	SNE; 1 Ret	SNE; 2 Ret	SNE; 3; 16	KNO; 1; 14	KNO; 2 Ret	KNO; 3; 16	ROC; 1 Ret	ROC; 2 Ret	ROC; 3; 21	SIL; 1 Ret	SIL; 2; 18	SIL; 3 Ret	BRH; 1; 17	BRH; 2; 18	BRH; 3; 15	21st	28
2017	Team Shredded Wheat Racing with Duo	Ford Focus ST	BRH; 1; 15	BRH; 2 Ret	BRH; 3; 22	DON; 1 Ret	DON; 2; 25	DON; 3; 24	THR; 1; 24	THR; 2 Ret	THR; 3 DNS	OUL; 1; 26	OUL; 2; 20	OUL; 3; 23	CRO; 1; 18	CRO; 2; 10	CRO; 3; 11	SNE; 1; 22	SNE; 2; 22	SNE; 3; 17	KNO; 1; 27	KNO; 2; 11	KNO; 3; 12	ROC; 1; 22	ROC; 2; 20	ROC; 3; 23	SIL; 1; 22	SIL; 2; 20	SIL; 3; 16	BRH; 1; 21	BRH; 2; 27	BRH; 3; 23	28th	22
