= 2025 Porsche Carrera Cup Great Britain =

One-make motor racing series in the UK

The 2025 Porsche Carrera Cup Great Britain is a multi-event, one-make motor racing championship held across England and Scotland. The championship features a mix of professional motor racing teams and privately funded drivers. It forms a part of the extensive program of support categories built up around the BTCC centrepiece.

== Race calendar ==
Round		Circuit	Date
1	R1	Donington Park (National Circuit, Leicestershire)	26–27 April
1	R2	Donington Park (National Circuit, Leicestershire)	26–27 April
2	R3	Snetterton Circuit (Norfolk)	24–25 May
2	R4	Snetterton Circuit (Norfolk)	24–25 May
3	R5	Thruxton Circuit (Hampshire)	7–8 June
3	R6	Thruxton Circuit (Hampshire)	7–8 June
4	R7	Croft (North Yorkshire)	2–3 August
4	R8	Croft (North Yorkshire)	2–3 August
5	R9	Knockhill (Fife)	16–17 August
5	R10	Knockhill (Fife)	16–17 August
6	R11	Donington Park (Grand Prix Circuit, Leicestershire)	30–31 August
6	R12	Donington Park (Grand Prix Circuit, Leicestershire)	30–31 August
7	R13	Silverstone Circuit (National Circuit, Northamptonshire)	20–21 September
7	R14	Silverstone Circuit (National Circuit, Northamptonshire)	20–21 September
8	R15	Brands Hatch (Grand Prix Circuit, Kent)	4–5 October
8	R16	Brands Hatch (Grand Prix Circuit, Kent)	4–5 October

== Team and drivers ==
Team	No.	Driver	Class	Rounds
(United Kingdom) Rosland Gold by Century Motorsport	1	(United Kingdom) George Gamble	P	1–2
(United Kingdom) Rosland Gold by Century Motorsport	40	(South Africa) Andrew Rackstraw	P	1–2
(United Kingdom) Century Motorsport	22	(United Kingdom) Carl Cavers	Am	1–2
(United Kingdom) Century Motorsport	52	(United Kingdom) Angus Whiteside	P	1–2
(United Kingdom) Century Motorsport	58	(Scotland) Henry Dawes	PA	1–2
(United Kingdom) Eden Motorsport	8	(United Kingdom) Aaron Mason	PA	1
(United Kingdom) Eden Motorsport	10	(United Kingdom) Will Martin	P	1–2
(United Kingdom) Eden Motorsport	94	(United Kingdom) Oliver White	PA	1–2
(United Kingdom) Team Parker Racing	18	(United Kingdom) Sebastian Hopkins	P	1–2
(United Kingdom) Team Parker Racing	30	(United Kingdom) William Jenkins	PA	1–2
(United Kingdom) Team Parker Racing	73	(Argentina) William Paul	Am	1–2
(United Kingdom) Team Parker Racing	99	(United Kingdom) Sid Smith	P	1–2
(United Kingdom) Duckhams Yuasa Racing by Graves Motorsport	44	(United Kingdom) Jonathon Beeson	Am	1–2
(United Kingdom) Duckhams Yuasa Racing by Graves Motorsport	71	(United Kingdom) Max Coates	PA	1–2
(United Kingdom) JTR	48	(United Kingdom) Ollie Jackson	PA	1–2
(United Kingdom) JTR	50	(United Kingdom) James Wallis	P	1
(United Kingdom) JTR	400	(United Kingdom) James Wallis	P	2
(United Kingdom) JTR	59	(United Kingdom) Josh Stanton	PA	1–2

Icon	Class
P	Pro Cup
PA	Pro-Am Cup
Am	Am Cup
R	Rookie Championship
	Guest Starter

== Race results ==
Round		Circuit	Pole position	Overall winner	Pro-Am winner	Am winner
1	R1	Donington Park (National Circuit)	(United Kingdom) Will Martin	(United Kingdom) Will Martin	(United Kingdom) Oliver White	(United Kingdom) Carl Cavers
1	R2	Donington Park (National Circuit)		(South Africa) Andrew Rackstraw	(United Kingdom) Oliver White	(United Kingdom) Carl Cavers
2	R3	Snetterton Circuit	(United Kingdom) Sid Smith	(United Kingdom) James Wallis	(United Kingdom) Josh Stanton	(United Kingdom) Jonathon Beeson
2	R4	Snetterton Circuit				
3	R5	Thruxton Circuit				
3	R6	Thruxton Circuit				
4	R7	Croft				
4	R8	Croft				
5	R9	Knockhill				
5	R10	Knockhill				
6	R11	Donington Park (Grand Prix Circuit)				
6	R12	Donington Park (Grand Prix Circuit)				
7	R13	Silverstone Circuit (National Circuit)				
7	R14	Silverstone Circuit (National Circuit)				
8	R15	Brands Hatch (Grand Prix Circuit)				
8	R16	Brands Hatch (Grand Prix Circuit)				

== Results and standings ==
Points system
	1st	2nd	3rd	4th	5th	6th	7th	8th	PP	FL
Race 1 (Pro)	12	10	8	6	4	3	2	1	2	1
Race 2 (All Classes)	10	8	6	5	4	3	2	1	0	1

=== Drivers' championships ===
Pos	Driver	DON		SNE	THR	CRO	KNO	DON	SIL	BHGP	Pts
Pro Class
	(United Kingdom) Angus Whiteside	3	2								16
	(South Africa) Andrew Rackstraw	5	1								15
	(United Kingdom) Will Martin	1	Ret								15
	(United Kingdom) James Wallis	4	3								12
	(United Kingdom) Sid Smith	2	Ret	P							12
	(United Kingdom) George Gamble	10	5								7
	(United Kingdom) Sebastian Hopkins	6	9								7
Pro-Am Class
	(United Kingdom) Oliver White	7	4								21
	(United Kingdom) Josh Stanton	8	7								14
	(United Kingdom) Max Coates	11	6								14
	(United Kingdom) Ollie Jackson	9	8								11
	(United Kingdom) William Jenkins	12	10	P							12
	(United Kingdom) Aaron Mason	14	11								6
	(Scotland) Henry Dawes	Ret	DNS								-
Am Class
	(United Kingdom) Carl Cavers	13	12								21
	(United Kingdom) Jonathon Beeson	15	13	P							21
	(Argentina) William Paul	16	14								12
