= 2024 Porsche Sprint Challenge Great Britain =

The 2024 Porsche Sprint Challenge Great Britain (known for sponsorship reasons as the 2024 Cayman Islands Porsche Sprint Challenge Great Britain) was a multi-event, one-make motor racing championship held across England and Scotland. The championship featured a mix of professional motor racing teams and privately funded drivers, competing in Porsche 718 Cayman GT4 Clubsport cars. The 2024 season was the 5th Porsche Sprint Challenge GB season, the season began on 25 May 2024 at Snetterton and ended on 6 October at Brands Hatch. This was the second season of being under the TOCA support package that supports the British Touring Car Championship.

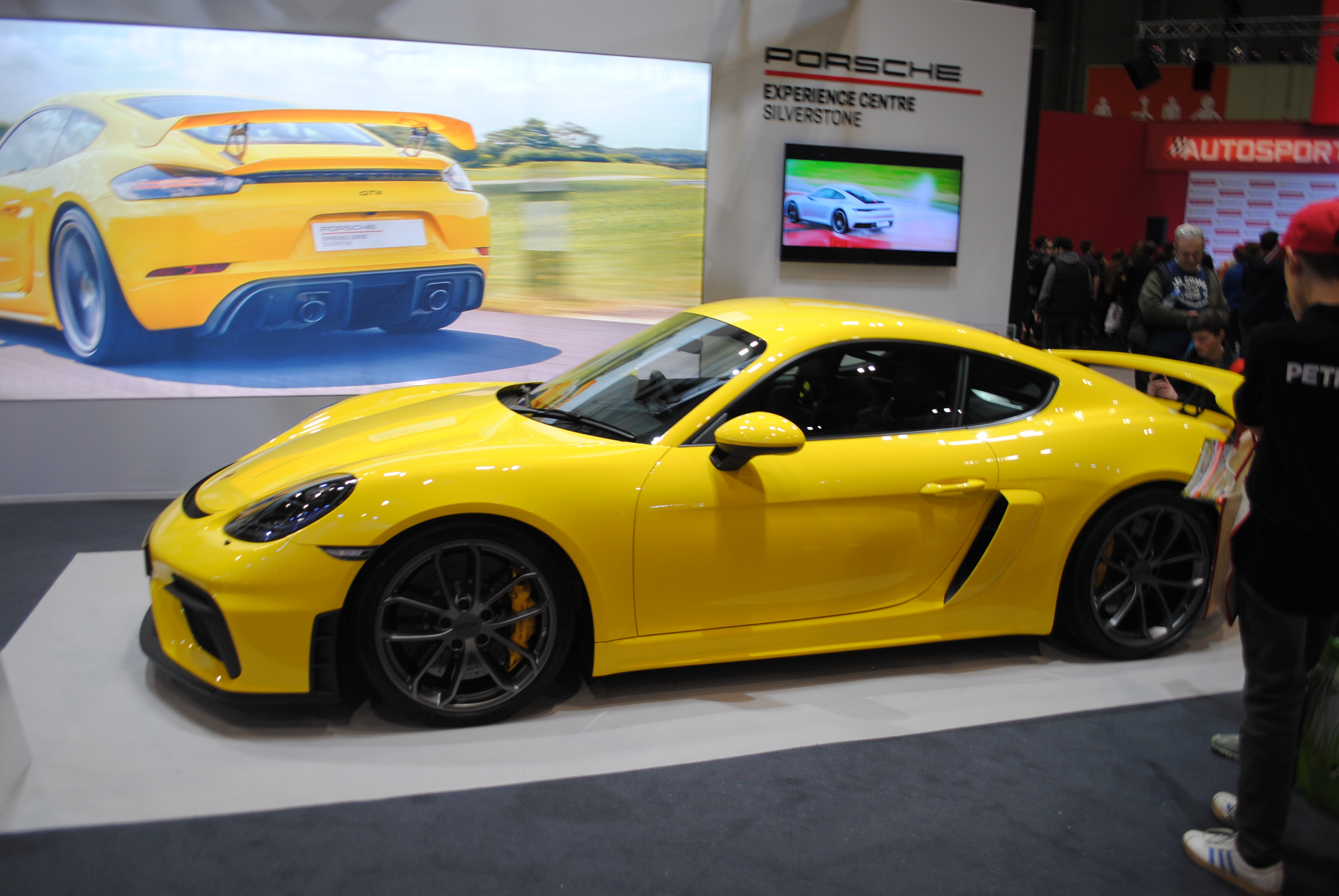
The car used in the championship, the Porsche 718 Cayman GT4 Clubsport.

== Teams and drivers ==
The following teams and drivers are currently signed to run the 2024 season. All teams are run under a British license.

Team	No.	Driver	Rounds
RS Clubsport Pro
Team Parker Racing	18	(United Kingdom) Seb Hopkins	All
Team Parker Racing	30	(United Kingdom) Will Jenkins	All
Clean Racing	22	(United Kingdom) Toby Trice	All
Parker Classic Works	26	(Republic of Ireland) Robert Cronin	1–4
Team Omologato with Graves Motorsport	32	(United Kingdom) Ethan Hammerton	All
Team Omologato with Graves Motorsport	71	(United Kingdom) Max Coates	All
Toro Verde GT	43	(United Kingdom) Thomas Bradshaw	1–4
Xentek Motorsport	98	(China) Oliver Cottam	All
Rob Boston Racing	99	(United Kingdom) Joe Marshall	3–6
RS Clubsport Am
Toro Verde GT	8	(United Kingdom) Edward Stanton	1–4, 6
Xentek Motorsport	16	(United Kingdom) Bal Sidhu	All
Clean Racing	25	(United Kingdom) Matthew Kyle-Henney	All
Graves Motorsport	27	(United Kingdom) Jacob Tofts	All
JWB Motorsport	28	(United Kingdom) George Jaxon	All
Breakell Racing	33	(United Kingdom) Reece Somerfield	1–4
Parker Classic Works	88	(United Kingdom) Oliver Meadows	All
Clubsport Pro
Team Parker Racing	5	(France) Oskar Dix	All
Race Car Consultants	11	(Republic of Ireland) Ben Mulryan	All
Clean Racing	65	(Australia) Caitlin Wood	1
Xentek Motorsport	70	(United Kingdom) Samuel Harvey	All
Clubsport Am
Breakell Racing	3	(Morocco) Karim Sekkat	All
Graves Motorsport	44	(United Kingdom) Johnathan Beeson	All
JWB Motorsport	50	(United Kingdom) Darelle Wilson	All
Team Parker Racing	87	(United Kingdom) Paul Porter	All

== Race Calendar ==
Round		Circuit	Date	Pole position	Fastest lap	Winning Pro	Winning team	Winning Am
1	R1	(United Kingdom) Snetterton Motor Racing Circuit (300 Circuit, Norfolk)	25 May	(United Kingdom) Sebastian Hopkins	(United Kingdom) Sebastian Hopkins	(United Kingdom) Sebastian Hopkins	(United Kingdom) Team Parker Racing	(United Kingdom) Reece Somerfield
1	R2	(United Kingdom) Snetterton Motor Racing Circuit (300 Circuit, Norfolk)	26 May		(United Kingdom) Max Coates	(United Kingdom) Max Coates	(United Kingdom) Team Omologato with Graves Motorsport	(United Kingdom) Matthew Kyle-Henney
1	R3	(United Kingdom) Snetterton Motor Racing Circuit (300 Circuit, Norfolk)	26 May		(United Kingdom) Sebastian Hopkins	(United Kingdom) Sebastian Hopkins	(United Kingdom) Team Parker Racing	(United Kingdom) Reece Somerfield
2	R4	(United Kingdom) Oulton Park (Island Circuit, Cheshire)	22 June	(United Kingdom) Sebastian Hopkins	(United Kingdom) Sebastian Hopkins	(United Kingdom) Sebastian Hopkins	(United Kingdom) Team Parker Racing	(United Kingdom) Matthew Kyle-Henney
2	R5	(United Kingdom) Oulton Park (Island Circuit, Cheshire)	23 June		(United Kingdom) Thomas Bradshaw	(United Kingdom) Thomas Bradshaw	(United Kingdom) Toro Verde GT	(United Kingdom) Jacob Tofts
2	R6	(United Kingdom) Oulton Park (Island Circuit, Cheshire)	23 June		(United Kingdom) Thomas Bradshaw	(United Kingdom) Thomas Bradshaw	(United Kingdom) Toro Verde GT	(United Kingdom) Jacob Tofts
3	R7	(United Kingdom) Croft Circuit (North Yorkshire)	27 July	(United Kingdom) Sebastian Hopkins	(United Kingdom) Toby Trice	(United Kingdom) Max Coates	(United Kingdom) Team Omologato with Graves Motorsport	(United Kingdom) Jacob Tofts
3	R8	(United Kingdom) Croft Circuit (North Yorkshire)	27 July		(United Kingdom) Sebastian Hopkins	(United Kingdom) Sebastian Hopkins	(United Kingdom) Team Parker Racing	(United Kingdom) Jacob Tofts
3	R9	(United Kingdom) Croft Circuit (North Yorkshire)	28 July		(United Kingdom) Sebastian Hopkins	(United Kingdom) Max Coates	(United Kingdom) Team Omologato with Graves Motorsport	(United Kingdom) Edward Stanton
4	R10	(United Kingdom) Donington Park (Grand Prix Circuit,Leicestershire)	24 August					
4	R11	(United Kingdom) Donington Park (Grand Prix Circuit,Leicestershire)	25 August					
4	R12	(United Kingdom) Donington Park (Grand Prix Circuit,Leicestershire)	25 August					
5	R13	(United Kingdom) Silverstone Circuit (National Circuit, Northamptonshire)	21 September					
5	R14	(United Kingdom) Silverstone Circuit (National Circuit, Northamptonshire)	22 September					
5	R15	(United Kingdom) Silverstone Circuit (National Circuit, Northamptonshire)	22 September					
6	R16	(United Kingdom) Brands Hatch (Grand Prix Circuit, Kent)	5 October					
6	R17	(United Kingdom) Brands Hatch (Grand Prix Circuit, Kent)	6 October					
6	R18	(United Kingdom) Brands Hatch (Grand Prix Circuit, Kent)	6 October					

== Championship standings ==
Points system
1st	2nd	3rd	4th	5th	6th	7th	8th	P	FL
10	8	6	5	4	3	2	1	1	1

=== Drivers' championships ===
Pos	Driver	SNE			OUL			CRO			DONGP	SIL	BHGP	Pts	Penalties	Final Pts
RS Clubsport Pro Class																
1	(United Kingdom) Sebastian Hopkins	1	2	1	1	4	Ret	2	1	2				76	-6	70
2	(United Kingdom) Max Coates	2	1	2	4	3	3	1	3	1				70	0	70
3	(United Kingdom) Thomas Bradshaw	5	4	4	2	1	1	Ret	5	7				50	0	50
4	(United Kingdom) Will Jenkins	4	3	3	3	4	2	Ret	2	Ret				44	0	44
5	(United Kingdom) Ethan Hammerton	3	7	7	5	2	4	3	4	4				43	0	43
6	(Republic of Ireland) Robert Cronin	7	5	5	6	Ret	7	4	6	6				26	0	26
7	(China) Oliver Cottam	8	8	8	7	6	5	6	8	3				22	0	22
8	(United Kingdom) Toby Trice	6	6	6	8	7	6	7	7	8				21	0	21
9	(United Kingdom) Joe Marshall-Birks							5	9	5				8	0	8
RS Clubsport Am Class																
1	(United Kingdom) Jacob Tofts	6	4	3	2	1	1	1	1	2				73	0	73
2	(United Kingdom) Edward Stanton	2	3	5	3	2	2	5	2	1				64	0	64
3	(United Kingdom) Matthew Kyle-Henney	3	1	4	1	3	4	2	3	3				66	0	66
4	(United Kingdom) Reece Somerfield	1	2	1	4	4	3	4	5	5				59	-2	57
5	(United Kingdom) Oliver Meadows	4	5	2	5	Ret	5	3	4	4				42	0	42
6	(United Kingdom) Bal Sidhu	7	6	6	7	5	Ret	6	7	Ret				19	-2	17
7	(United Kingdom) George Jaxon	5	7	Ret	6	6	Ret	Ret	6	Ret				15	0	15
Clubsport Pro Class																
1	(France) Oscar Dix	1	1	1	2	2	3	2	2	2				82	-3	79
2	(United Kingdom) Samuel Harvey	Ret	3	2	1	1	1	3	3	3				63	-2	61
3	(Republic of Ireland) Ben Mulryan	Ret	DNS	DNS	3	3	2	1	1	1				55	0	55
4	(Australia) Caitlin Wood	2	2	3										22	0	22
Clubsport Am Class																
1	(United Kingdom) Darelle Wilson	1	3	3	1	1	1	4	1	3				74	0	74
2	(United Kingdom) Jonathan Beeson	2	2	Ret	2	2	2	1	2	1				77	-7	70
3	(Morocco) Karim Sekkat	3	1	2	4	3	3	2	Ret	4				56	0	56
4	(United Kingdom) Paul Porter	4	4	1	3	4	4	3	3	2				56	0	56
