= George Gamble (racing driver) =

British racing driver (born 1996)

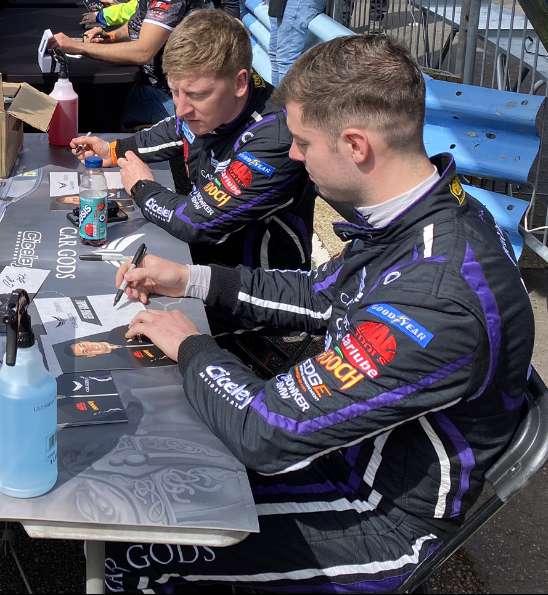
- Gamble (right) and Adam Morgan (left) at Thruxton in 2022
- Nationality: (United Kingdom) British
- Born: 17 July 1996 (age 30) Nottingham, England
- Relatives: Tom Gamble (brother)

Porsche Carrera Cup Great Britain career
- Debut season: 2018
- Categorisation: FIA Silver
- Car number: 1
- Former teams: Amigos Team Parker
- Starts: 47 (47 entries)
- Wins: 9
- Podiums: 20
- Poles: 1
- Fastest laps: 6
- Best finish: 1st in 2024

Previous series
- 2022-2023 2020 2019 2017 2014, 2013 2012 2012, 2011: BTCC; GT4 European Series; Porsche Supercup; Ginetta GT4 Supercup; Ginetta GT5 Challenge; Formula Renault BARC Winter Series; Ginetta Junior Championship

Championship titles
- 2024 2014 2011: Porsche Carerra Cup GB; Ginetta GT5 Challenge G40; Ginetta Junior Winter Series

George Gamble (born 17 July 1996 in Nottingham, England) is a British racing driver who most recently competed in the 2025 Porsche Carrera Cup GB driving for Rosland Gold by Century Motorsport. He is most known for his BTCC stints in 2022 and 2023, driving for Car Gods with Ciceley Motorsport and Toyota Gazoo Racing UK respectively.

== Career ==
=== Karting ===
Gamble competed in various karting championships from 2007 to 2010, competing against the likes of Formula 1 driver Alex Albon, Formula E driver Jake Dennis, and World Endurance Championship driver and former IndyCar driver Ed Jones.

=== Ginetta Junior Championship ===
Gamble made his car racing debut in the 2010 Ginetta Junior Winter Series with HHC Motorsport, and signed with TJ Motorsport for his debut full season in the main championship the following year. In the main championship he would finish third overall with three wins. He also competed in the Winter Series in 2011, which he won.

Gamble signed with Hillspeed to compete in the 2012 championship, but he withdrew from the series after two rounds.

=== Formula Renault BARC Winter Series ===
Months after his Ginetta Junior withdrawal, Gamble competed in the Formula Renault BARC Winter Series with Hillspeed, where he finished seventh overall.

=== Ginetta GT5 Challenge ===
In 2013, Gamble would move to the Ginetta GT5 Challenge, where he raced in one round with Total Control Racing, of which he won both races in this round, putting him 18th in the standings.

Gamble continued with TCR for his first full season in 2014, which he won, with seven victories and 18 podiums.

=== Ginetta GT4 Supercup ===
After a two year sabbatical to aid his younger brother Tom in karting, Gamble made his racing return in the 2017 Ginetta GT4 Supercup, racing with JHR Developments. He finished third overall, with four wins.

=== British GT ===
Gamble appeared at the Rockingham round of the 2017 British GT Championship alongside Anna Walewska at Century Motorsport.

=== Porsche Carrera Cup Great Britain ===
Gamble joined Amigos Team Parker for the 2018 Porsche Carrera Cup Great Britain, where he finished sixth overall in the Pro class with three wins.

Gamble switched to Amigos Redline Racing for the 2019 season, where he finished third in the Pro class with four wins.

Gamble returned to Porsche Carrera Cup GB for 2024 after his BTCC stint ended, driving for Rosland Gold by Century Motorsport. He would win two races and claim his first ever pole in the series, on his way to the championship and his first since Ginetta GT5 in 2014.

=== Porsche Supercup ===
Gamble appeared at the Silverstone round of the 2019 Porsche Supercup, racing as a guest driver for JTR.

=== GT4 European Series ===
Gamble raced in the Circuit Paul Ricard round of the 2020 GT4 European Series with R-Motorsport alongside Seb Perez.

=== British Touring Car Championship ===
==== 2022 ====
On 28 February 2022, it was announced that Gamble would make his BTCC debut in the 2022 British Touring Car Championship, racing alongside Adam Morgan at Car Gods with Ciceley Motorsport.

Gamble achieved his first win in the series in Race 3 at the Knockhill Racing Circuit in the 2022 season. He finished 13th in the overall standings, and runner-up in the Jack Sears Trophy.

==== 2023 ====
For 2023, Gamble moved to Toyota Gazoo Racing UK, driving alongside Rory Butcher and Ricky Collard.

== Personal life ==
Gamble's younger brother, Tom, is also a racing driver competing in endurance racing. George took a two year sabbatical in 2015 and 2016 in order to aid Tom in karting.

== Controversy ==
In 2018, Gamble gained publicity after crashing a Ford Ranger into a house while intoxicated. He received a 20 month ban from driving on the road.

== Karting record ==
=== Karting career summary ===
Season	Series	Position
2007	Kartmasters British Grand Prix - Comer Cadet	21st
2008	Super 1 National Comer Cadet Championship	30th
2009	Super 1 National KF3 Championship	37th
2009	MSA Kartmasters Grand Prix - KF3	23rd
2010	MSA British Junior Kart Championship KF3	12th

== Racing record ==
=== Racing career summary ===
Season	Series	Team	Races	Wins	Poles	F/Laps	Podiums	Points	Position
2010	Ginetta Junior Winter Series	HHC Motorsport	4	0	0	0	0	0	N/A
2011	Ginetta Junior Winter Series	TJ Motorsport	4	1	0	2	3	117	**1st**
2011	Ginetta Junior Championship	TJ Motorsport	19	3	6	1	8	383	**3rd**
2012	Ginetta Junior Championship	Hillspeed	4	0	2	1	2	50	15th
2012	Formula Renault BARC Winter Series	Hillspeed	4	0	0	0	0	50	7th
2013	Ginetta GT5 Challenge - G40	Total Control Racing	2	2	0	1	2	71	18th
2014	Ginetta GT5 Challenge - G40	Total Control Racing	20	7	6	8	18	599	**1st**
2017	Ginetta GT4 Supercup - Pro	JHR Developments	23	4	2	6	9	496	**3rd**
2018	Porsche Carrera Cup Great Britain - Pro	Amigos Team Parker	16	3	0	1	3	75	6th
2019	Porsche Supercup	JTR	1	0	0	0	0	0	NC†
2019	Porsche Carrera Cup Great Britain - Pro	Amigos Redline Racing	15	4	0	2	10	113	**3rd**
2020	GT4 European Series - Silver Cup	R-Motorsport	2	0	0	0	0	0	N/A
2022	British Touring Car Championship	Car Gods with Cicely Motorsport	30	1	0	0	2	123	13th
2023	British Touring Car Championship	Toyota Gazoo Racing UK	30	0	0	0	0	60	21st
2024	Porsche Carrera Cup Great Britain - Pro	Rosland Gold by Century Motorsport	16	2	1	3	7	105	**1st**
2024	Porsche Supercup	Century Motorsport	1	0	0	0	0	0	NC†
2025	Porsche Carrera Cup Great Britain - Pro	Century Motorsport	16	1	2	0	6	90	4th
2026	British GT Championship - GT4	Optimum Motorsport	4	2	2	0	2	84.5	6th

^{†} As Gamble was a guest driver, he was ineligible for points. ^{*} Season still in progress.

=== Complete Porsche Supercup results ===
(key) (Races in bold indicate pole position; races in italics indicate fastest lap)

Year	Team	1	2	3	4	5	6	7	8	8	10	Pos.	Points
2019	JTR	CAT	MON	RBR	SIL; 13	HOC	HUN	SPA	MNZ	MEX	MEX	NC†	0†
2024	Century Motorsport	IMO	MON	RBR	SIL; 16	HUN	SPA	ZND	MNZ			NC†	0†

^{†} As Gamble was a guest driver, he was ineligible for points.

=== Complete British Touring Car Championship results ===
(key) (Races in bold indicate pole position – 1 point awarded just in first race; races in italics indicate fastest lap – 1 point awarded all races; * signifies that driver led race for at least one lap – 1 point given all races)

Year	Team	Car	1	2	3	4	5	6	7	8	9	10	11	12	13	14	15	16	17	18	19	20	21	22	23	24	25	26	27	28	29	30	DC	Points
2022	Car Gods with Ciceley Motorsport	BMW 330e M Sport	DON; 1; 6	DON; 2; 3	DON; 3; 20	BRH; 1; 14	BRH; 2; 9	BRH; 3; 7	THR; 1; 14	THR; 2; 20	THR; 3; 14	OUL; 1; 18	OUL; 2; 18	OUL; 3 Ret	CRO; 1; 9	CRO; 2 Ret	CRO; 3; 19	KNO; 1; 5	KNO; 2; 7	**KNO**; **3**; 1*	SNE; 1; 16	SNE; 2; 13	SNE; 3; 14	THR; 1 Ret	THR; 2; 19	THR; 3 Ret	SIL; 1; 24	SIL; 2; 20	SIL; 3; 16	BRH; 1; 8	BRH; 2; 11	BRH; 3; 6	13th	123
2023	Toyota Gazoo Racing UK	Toyota Corolla GR Sport	DON; 1; 8	DON; 2 Ret	DON; 3; 13	BRH; 1; 11	BRH; 2; 8	BRH; 3; 21	SNE; 1; 14	SNE; 2; 16	SNE; 3 Ret	THR; 1; 17	THR; 2 Ret	THR; 3; 17	OUL; 1 Ret	OUL; 2; 20	OUL; 3; 11	CRO; 1; 18	CRO; 2 Ret	CRO; 3; 10	KNO; 1; 8	KNO; 2; 11	KNO; 3; 9	DON; 1; 13	DON; 2 Ret	DON; 3; 13	SIL; 1; 15	SIL; 2; 23	SIL; 3; 15	BRH; 1; 16	BRH; 2 Ret	BRH; 3 Ret	21st	60

=== Complete British GT Championship results ===
(key) (Races in bold indicate pole position) (Races in italics indicate fastest lap)

Year	Team	Car	Class	1	2	3	4	5	6	7	8	DC	Points
2026	Optimum Motorsport	McLaren Artura GT4	GT4	SIL; 1	OUL; 1	OUL; 2	SPA; 1	**SNE**; **1**; 16	SNE; 2; 13	DON; 1; 16	**BRH**; **1**; 11	6th	84.5

Sporting positions
Preceded by Seb Morris	Ginetta Junior Winter Series; Champion; 2011	Succeeded by Harry Woodhead
Preceded by Oliver Basey-Fisher	Ginetta GT5 Challenge; Champion; 2014	Succeeded by James Kellett
Preceded by Adam Smalley	Porsche Carrera Cup GB; Champion; 2024	Succeeded by Andrew Rackstraw
