= 2026 Porsche Sprint Challenge Great Britain =

Porsche one-make motor racing championship

The 2026 Porsche Carwow Sprint Challenge Great Britain was the seventh season of the Porsche Sprint Challenge Great Britain, a one-make motor racing championship. The season began at Donington Park on 18 April and finished at Brands Hatch on 11 October. Its six rounds, each comprising three races, formed part of the British Touring Car Championship's TOCA support package.

The championship used the Porsche 718 Cayman GT4 RS Clubsport and 718 Cayman GT4 Clubsport cars. Drivers in the RS Clubsport compete in professional and amateur categories, while the two previous Clubsport categories were combined into a single class for 2026.

== Teams and drivers ==
Team	No.	Driver	Class	Rounds
Graves Motorsport	2	(United Kingdom) Gracie Mitchell	C	1–2, 4, 6
Graves Motorsport	8	(United Kingdom) Mark McKenzie	C	1–3
Graves Motorsport	8	(United Kingdom) Mark McKenzie	Am	4–6
Graves Motorsport	11	(United Kingdom) Gabe Fairbrother	C	All
Graves Motorsport	17	(United Kingdom) Neil Tofts	Am	5
Graves Motorsport	32	(United Kingdom) Ethan Hammerton	P	All
Graves Motorsport	45	(United Kingdom) Dan Zelos	P	All
Graves Motorsport	98	(United Kingdom) Oliver Cottam	P	1
Clean Racing	7	(United Kingdom) Aimee Watts	Am	All
Clean Racing	23	(United Kingdom) Max Watt	P	1–3, 5
Clean Racing	25	(United Kingdom) Matthew Kyle-Henney	P	All
Clean Racing	82	(United Kingdom) Lydia Walmsley	P	All
CCK Motorsport	16	(United Kingdom) Richard Hosking	Am	1–5
CCK Motorsport	75	(Republic of Ireland) Colin Cronin	P	6
Race Car Consultants	19	(United Kingdom) Daniel Lewis	Am	All
Raceworks Motorsport	20	(United Kingdom) Christopher Bingham	P	All
Xentek Motorsport	31	(United Kingdom) Felix Livesey	P	2–4
Xentek Motorsport	44	(United Kingdom) Hannah Chapman	Am	1
Xentek Motorsport	52	(United Kingdom) Alister Weston	C	All
Xentek Motorsport	55	(United Kingdom) James Seale	Am	All
Xentek Motorsport	59	(United Kingdom) Josh Smith	P	5
Xentek Motorsport	70	(United Kingdom) Samuel Harvey	P	All
Breakell Racing	21	(United Kingdom) Will Rochford	Am	1
Breakell Racing	33	(United Kingdom) Reece Somerfield	Am	All
Team Parker Racing	15	(United Kingdom) Adam Knight	Am	6
Team Parker Racing	92	(Australia) Joshua Rogers	P	All
Team Parker Racing	99	(United Kingdom) Joe Marshall	P	All
Toro Verde GT	56	(United Kingdom) Dean Burden	Am	All
Toro Verde GT	71	(United Kingdom) Leo Purches	C	5
Toro Verde GT	76	(United Kingdom) Matthew Briers	Am	1–4, 6
Tuthill UK	67	(Italy) Giancarlo Romano	C	All

Icon	Class
P	RS Pro
Am	RS Am
C	Clubsport
	Talent Pool

== Calendar ==
The championship is scheduled to contest 18 races across six rounds. Knockhill returns after its first appearance in 2025, while Croft returns to the calendar for the first time since 2024.

Round	Circuit	Date	Map of Circuit Locations
1	Donington Park, Leicestershire, England	18–19 April	2026 Porsche Sprint Challenge Great Britain is located in the United Kingdom
2	Oulton Park, Little Budworth, Cheshire, England	6–7 June	2026 Porsche Sprint Challenge Great Britain is located in the United Kingdom
3	Knockhill Racing Circuit, Fife, Scotland	8–9 August	2026 Porsche Sprint Challenge Great Britain is located in the United Kingdom
4	Croft Circuit, North Yorkshire, England	5–6 September	2026 Porsche Sprint Challenge Great Britain is located in the United Kingdom
5	Silverstone Circuit, Silverstone, Northamptonshire, England	26–27 September	2026 Porsche Sprint Challenge Great Britain is located in the United Kingdom
6	Brands Hatch, West Kingsdown, Kent, England	10–11 October	2026 Porsche Sprint Challenge Great Britain is located in the United Kingdom

== Race results ==
Round		Circuit	Pole Position	RS Pro winner	RS Am winner	Clubsport winner
1	R1	(United Kingdom) Donington Park	(United Kingdom) Samuel Harvey	(United Kingdom) Joe Marshall	(United Kingdom) Reece Somerfield	(United Kingdom) Gabe Fairbrother
1	R2	(United Kingdom) Donington Park	(United Kingdom) Samuel Harvey	(United Kingdom) Joe Marshall	(United Kingdom) Dean Burden	(United Kingdom) Gabe Fairbrother
1	R3	(United Kingdom) Donington Park	(United Kingdom) Joe Marshall	(United Kingdom) Joe Marshall	(United Kingdom) Dean Burden	(United Kingdom) Gabe Fairbrother
2	R4	(United Kingdom) Oulton Park	(United Kingdom) Joe Marshall	(United Kingdom) Joe Marshall	(United Kingdom) Daniel Lewis	(United Kingdom) Gracie Mitchell
2	R5	(United Kingdom) Oulton Park	(United Kingdom) Joe Marshall	(United Kingdom) Joe Marshall	(United Kingdom) James Seale	(United Kingdom) Gabe Fairbrother
2	R6	(United Kingdom) Oulton Park	(United Kingdom) Joe Marshall	(United Kingdom) Joe Marshall	(United Kingdom) James Seale	(United Kingdom) Gabe Fairbrother
3	R7	(United Kingdom) Knockhill Racing Circuit	(Australia) Joshua Rogers	(Australia) Joshua Rogers	(United Kingdom) Daniel Lewis	(United Kingdom) Gabe Fairbrother
3	R8	(United Kingdom) Knockhill Racing Circuit	(Australia) Joshua Rogers	(Australia) Joshua Rogers	(United Kingdom) Dean Burden	(United Kingdom) Gabe Fairbrother
3	R9	(United Kingdom) Knockhill Racing Circuit	(Australia) Joshua Rogers	(Australia) Joshua Rogers	(United Kingdom) Dean Burden	(United Kingdom) Gabe Fairbrother
4	R10	(United Kingdom) Croft Circuit	(Australia) Joshua Rogers	(United Kingdom) Joe Marshall	(United Kingdom) Daniel Lewis	(United Kingdom) Gabe Fairbrother
4	R11	(United Kingdom) Croft Circuit	(Australia) Joshua Rogers	(Australia) Joshua Rogers	(United Kingdom) Daniel Lewis	(United Kingdom) Gabe Fairbrother
4	R12	(United Kingdom) Croft Circuit	(Australia) Joshua Rogers	(Australia) Joshua Rogers	(United Kingdom) Daniel Lewis	(United Kingdom) Gabe Fairbrother
5	R13	(United Kingdom) Silverstone Circuit	(Australia) Joshua Rogers	(Australia) Joshua Rogers	(United Kingdom) Daniel Lewis	(United Kingdom) Gabe Fairbrother
5	R14	(United Kingdom) Silverstone Circuit	(Australia) Joshua Rogers	(Australia) Joshua Rogers	(United Kingdom) Daniel Lewis	(United Kingdom) Gabe Fairbrother
5	R15	(United Kingdom) Silverstone Circuit	(Australia) Joshua Rogers	(Australia) Joshua Rogers	(United Kingdom) Daniel Lewis	(United Kingdom) Gabe Fairbrother
6	R16	(United Kingdom) Brands Hatch	(Australia) Joshua Rogers	(Australia) Joshua Rogers	(United Kingdom) James Seale	(United Kingdom) Gabe Fairbrother
6	R17	(United Kingdom) Brands Hatch	(Australia) Joshua Rogers	(Australia) Joshua Rogers	(United Kingdom) Daniel Lewis	(United Kingdom) Gabe Fairbrother
6	R18	(United Kingdom) Brands Hatch	(Australia) Joshua Rogers	(Australia) Joshua Rogers	(United Kingdom) Daniel Lewis	(United Kingdom) Gabe Fairbrother

== Season report ==
Marshall won all three RS Pro races at Donington Park, while debutant Joshua Rogers finished on the podium in all three. Somerfield inherited the first RS Am victory after Matthew Kyle-Henney was reclassified into RS Pro, and Burden won the other two RS Am races. Fairbrother won all three Clubsport races on his championship debut.

Marshall extended his winning run to six races by taking another hat-trick at Oulton Park. His round-six victory was the twelfth of his career, making him the driver with the most overall wins in the championship's history. Lewis and Seale recorded their first RS Am victories, while Mitchell took her first Clubsport win and Fairbrother won the remaining two races.

== Championship standings ==
=== Points system ===
Points are awarded to the first eight classified finishers in each category. One point is awarded for pole position in each category at each meeting, and one for the fastest lap in each category in every race. Guest drivers are ineligible to score. Drivers who participate in all three races at the final meeting and score points in round 6 are scheduled to receive an additional 55 points, subject to the organisers' discretion.

=== Scoring system ===
Position	1st	2nd	3rd	4th	5th	6th	7th	8th	Pole	FL
Points	10	8	6	5	4	3	2	1	1	1

=== Drivers' championships ===
==== RS Pro ====
Pos.	Driver	Team	DON (United Kingdom)			OUL (United Kingdom)			KNO (Scotland)			CRO (United Kingdom)			SIL (United Kingdom)			BRH (United Kingdom)			Points
1	(United Kingdom) Joe Marshall	Team Parker Racing	1	1	1	1	1	1	2	2	2	1	4	3	2	2	2	2	2	2	157
2	(Australia) Joshua Rogers	Team Parker Racing	3	2	3	2	10	8	1	1	1	9	1	1	1	1	1	1	1	1	156
3	(United Kingdom) Matthew Kyle-Henney	Clean Racing	4	6	7	3	3	3	3	3	3	2	2	Ret	Ret	3	3	5	4	4	88
4	(United Kingdom) Dan Zelos	Graves Motorsport	5	4	4	6	4	5	6	6	6	3	6	5	4	5	8	3	3	3	79
5	(United Kingdom) Ethan Hammerton	Graves Motorsport	Ret	7	6	Ret	2	2	9	5	4	4	5	4	3	4	4	4	DSQ	7	68
6	(United Kingdom) Samuel Harvey	Xentek Motorsport	2	5	5	4	8	10	4	4	5	5	3	2	6	9	6	6	Ret	DNS	67
7	(United Kingdom) Lydia Walmsley	Clean Racing	6	10	Ret	7	7	7	7	8	8	7	8	7	8	10	10	8	7	8	27
8	(United Kingdom) Christopher Bingham	Raceworks Motorsport	8	8	9	8	5	6	8	9	10	8	9	8	9	8	9	9	6	6	26
9	(United Kingdom) Felix Livesey	Xentek Motorsport				5	6	4	10	7	7	6	7	6							24
10	(United Kingdom) Max Watt	Clean Racing	7	9	8	9	9	9	5	Ret	9				7	6	7				16
11	(United Kingdom) Oliver Cottam	Graves Motorsport	Ret	3	2																14
12	(United Kingdom) Josh Smith	Xentek Motorsport													5	7	5				10
13	(Republic of Ireland) Colin Cronin	CCK Motorsport																7	5	5	10
Pos.	Driver	Team	DON (United Kingdom)			OUL (United Kingdom)			KNO (Scotland)			CRO (United Kingdom)			SIL (United Kingdom)			BRH (United Kingdom)			Points

==== RS Am ====
Pos.	Driver	Team	DON (United Kingdom)			OUL (United Kingdom)			KNO (Scotland)			CRO (United Kingdom)			SIL (United Kingdom)			BRH (United Kingdom)			Points
1	(United Kingdom) Daniel Lewis	Race Car Consultants	3	2	2	1	2	2	1	3	3	1	1	1	1	1	1	2	1	1	167
2	(United Kingdom) Dean Burden	Toro Verde GT	4	1	1	4	6	4	4	1	1	2	3	3	2	3	4	4	4	3	124
3	(United Kingdom) James Seale	Xentek Motorsport	5	5	Ret	3	1	1	2	7	4	4	2	2	3	2	Ret	1	2	2	115
4	(United Kingdom) Reece Somerfield	Breakell Racing	1	3	3	2	4	6	DSQ	2	2	3	Ret	Ret	4	5	6	3	3	5	92
5	(United Kingdom) Aimee Watts	Clean Racing	2	4	4	5	3	3	3	4	Ret	Ret	5	4	Ret	6	3	5	5	4	78
6	(United Kingdom) Richard Hosking	CCK Motorsport	6	6	6	6	5	Ret	6	6	6	7	7	6	5	7	2				49
7	(United Kingdom) Matthew Briers	Toro Verde GT	Ret	Ret	Ret	7	7	5	5	5	5	5	4	5				6	6	Ret	40
8	(United Kingdom) Mark McKenzie	Graves Motorsport										6	6	7	6	4	5	8	8	7	24
9	(United Kingdom) Hannah Chapman	Xentek Motorsport	7	7	5																8
10	(United Kingdom) Adam Knight	Team Parker Racing																7	7	6	7
11	(United Kingdom) Neil Tofts	Graves Motorsport													Ret	8	DNS				1
12	(United Kingdom) Will Rochford	Breakell Racing	Ret	Ret	DNS																0
Pos.	Driver	Team	DON (United Kingdom)			OUL (United Kingdom)			KNO (Scotland)			CRO (United Kingdom)			SIL (United Kingdom)			BRH (United Kingdom)			Points

==== Clubsport ====
Pos.	Driver	Team	DON (United Kingdom)			OUL (United Kingdom)			KNO (Scotland)			CRO (United Kingdom)			SIL (United Kingdom)			BRH (United Kingdom)			Points
1	(United Kingdom) Gabe Fairbrother	Graves Motorsport	1	1	1	2	1	1	1	1	1	1	1	1	1	1	1	1	1	1	200
2	(Italy) Giancarlo Romano	Tuthill UK	3	3	4	3	5	3	3	3	3	Ret	3	3	3	3	3	3	3	3	103
3	(United Kingdom) Gracie Mitchell	Graves Motorsport	2	2	2	1	2	2				2	2	2				2	2	2	100
4	(United Kingdom) Alister Weston	Xentek Motorsport	4	5	5	3	4	Ret	Ret	4	Ret	3	4	4	4	4	4	4	4	4	78
5	(United Kingdom) Mark McKenzie	Graves Motorsport	5	4	3	5	3	3	2	2	2										55
6	(United Kingdom) Leo Purches	Toro Verde UK													2	2	2				24
Pos.	Driver	Team	DON (United Kingdom)			OUL (United Kingdom)			KNO (Scotland)			CRO (United Kingdom)			SIL (United Kingdom)			BRH (United Kingdom)			Points

=== Talent Pool Championship ===
Eligible developing drivers also score Talent Pool points equal to the Championship Points that they accrue under the regulations.

Pos.	Driver	Team	Points
1	(United Kingdom) Christopher Bingham	Raceworks Motorsport	116
2	(United Kingdom) Lydia Walmsley	Clean Racing	105
3	(United Kingdom) James Seale	Xentek Motorsport	99
4	(United Kingdom) Felix Livesey	Xentek Motorsport	77
5	(United Kingdom) Max Watt	Clean Racing	66
6	(United Kingdom) Gabe Fairbrother	Graves Motorsport	15
7	(United Kingdom) Gracie Mitchell	Graves Motorsport	4
Pos.	Driver	Team	Points

=== Teams championships ===
==== RS teams ====
Pos.	Team	Points
1	Team Parker Racing	629
2	Graves Motorsport	415
3	Clean Racing	288
4	Xentek Motorsport	287
5	Race Car Consultants	142
8	Toro Verde GT	125
6	Raceworks Motorsport	116
7	Breakell Racing	84
9	CCK Motorsport	24
Pos.	Team	Points

==== Clubsport teams ====
Pos.	Team	Points
1	Graves Motorsport	576
2	Tuthill UK	268
3	Xentek Motorsport	216
Pos.	Team	Points
