= Seb Morris =

British racing driver

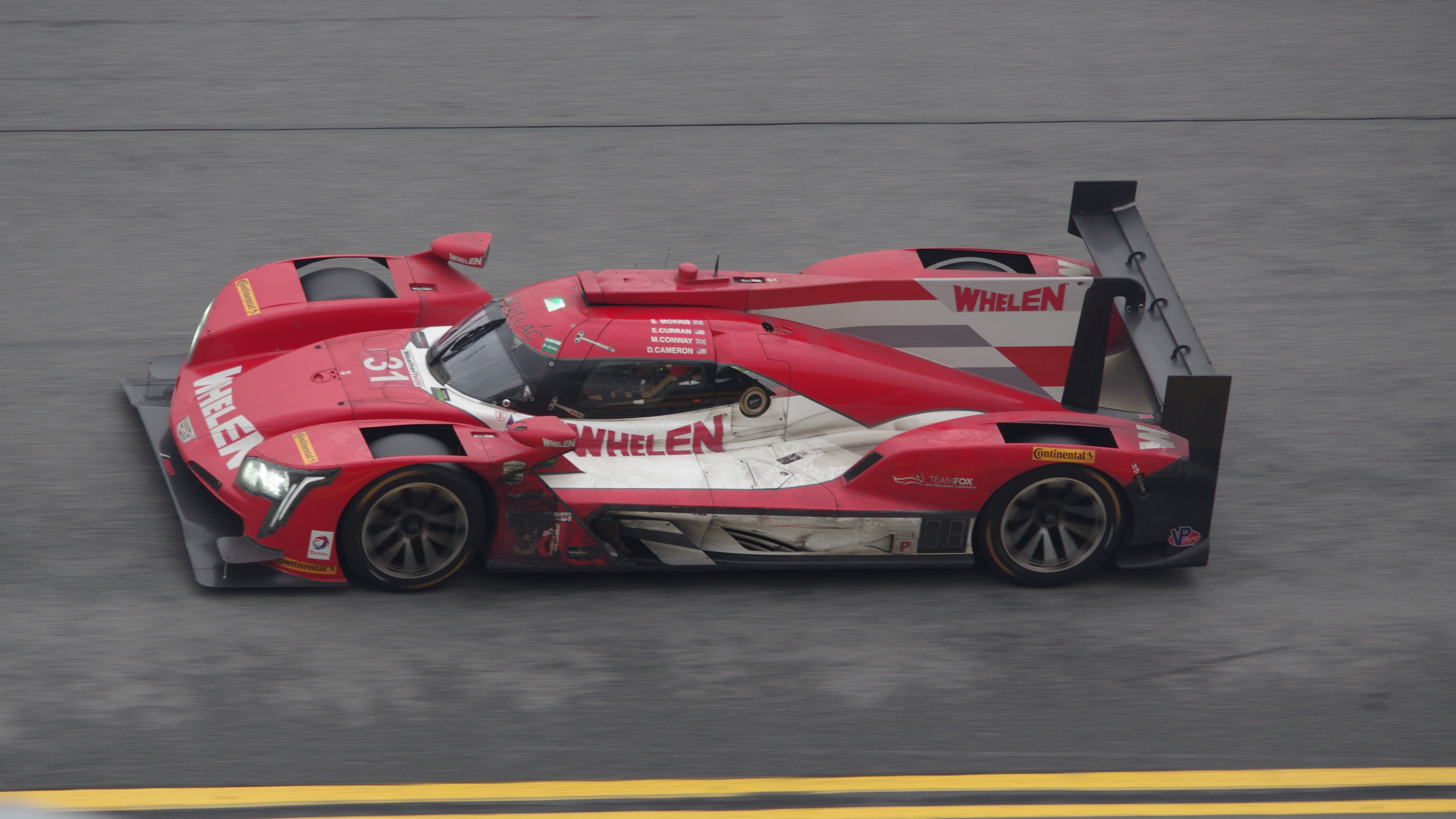
- Morris' Whelen Cadillac at Daytona 2017.
- Nationality: (United Kingdom) British
- Born: 30 November 1995 (age 30) Wrexham, Clwyd, Wales

British GT Championship career
- Debut season: 2016
- Current team: Team Parker Racing
- Categorisation: FIA Silver (until 2017); FIA Gold (2018–)
- Car number: 31
- Former teams: JRM Racing
- Starts: 42
- Wins: 6
- Poles: 8
- Fastest laps: 3
- Best finish: 1st in 2017

Previous series
- 2015 2014 2013 2012 2012, 2014 2010–2011: GP3 Series; Formula Renault 2.0 Alps; BRDC Formula 4 Championship; Formula Renault BARC; Formula Renault 2.0 NEC; Ginetta Junior Championship

Championship titles
- 2024 2017 2012 2011 2010: British GT Championship - GT4 Pro-Am; British GT Championship; Formula Renault BARC Winter Series; Ginetta Junior Championship; Ginetta Winter Series

Awards
- 2017 2017 2012 2011: Sunoco Whelen Challenge; BRDC Super Star; BRDC Rising Star; WRDA Welsh Young Driver of the Year.

Sebastian "Seb" Morris (born 30 November 1995) is a professional racing driver from Marford, who lives in Chester, Cheshire. He won the 2017 British GT Championship. He also won the 2017 Sunoco Challenge which gave him the prize drive in the No. 31 Whelen Engineering Racing Cadillac DPi at the Rolex 24 hours at Daytona. He led the race for three hours in his stint. Earlier in his career, Morris was a member of the Caterham F1 Academy and was selected by Jack Wills as a Young Brit for their 2013/14 Autumn / Winter campaign.

== Career ==
=== Ginetta Juniors ===
Morris began his motorsport career in 2007 when he competitively raced karts. He progressed to Ginetta Juniors in 2010 where he raced for Hillspeed and became the youngest ever podium finisher. Morris then followed this by competing in and winning the winter series at 14 years old. In the following season, 2011, Morris again raced for Hillspeed and won the Ginetta Junior Championship by winning eleven races out of the twenty rounds. In this year, he was also awarded the Welsh Young Driver of the Year accolade.

=== Formula Renault BARC ===
In 2012, Morris moved into single seater racing in the British Formula Renault Championship driving for the Fortec Motorsport team where he finished the season as the highest placed rookie and third overall. Morris then followed this with racing in and becoming the 2012 Winter Series Champion. That same year, Morris was selected as a member of the Motor Sports Association Academy and also named a British Racing Drivers' Club Rising Star.

In addition, Sky Sports F1 invited Morris to take part in a dedicated documentary called Britain's Next F1 Star which gave a behind the scenes look at his life as a teenager, a student and a racing driver.

=== Formula 4 ===
For the 2013 season, Morris raced in the inaugural BRDC Formula 4 Championship for the Hillspeed team where he continued to demonstrate his race craft and speed to finish the season as vice champion with one race win and nine podiums. As a result, Morris was selected as a finalist in the McLaren Autosport BRDC Award. Morris's talent was further recognised as he was featured in the Prodigies section of the first edition of the Formula magazine.

Morris was then signed by the Caterham F1 team as a member of their racing academy.

=== Formula Renault NEC ===
Morris has again teamed up with Fortec Motorsport to race in the 2014 Formula Renault 2.0 NEC season.

=== GP3 Series ===
On 9 March 2015, Morris was confirmed as a driver for Status Grand Prix and made his debut in the 2015 season.

=== British GT ===
For 2016, it was decided that Morris would move from single seaters to sportscars, with various opportunities available it was decided he would race a Bentley GT3 for Team Parker Racing in the 2016 British GT Championship series. He started pole position at his first GT event at Brands Hatch, and was followed by further pole positions at Oulton Park, Silverstone and Spa-Francorchamps and a fastest lap at Oulton Park which is also a GT3 lap record.

In 2017, Morris won the title in the very last race. Morris and his teammate Parfitt won at Rockingham, Silverstone, and Brands Hatch. They also secured pole position at four of the seven events. Morris also set the lap record at Spa-Francorchamps.

=== IMSA ===
In 2017, Morris raced for Action Express in the 2017 IMSA WeatherTech SportsCar Championship opening round, the 24 Hours of Daytona. The No. 31 car finished sixth overall after suffering electrical problems during the 24-hour race.

Morris was announced as a BRDC Super Star in February 2017.

== Personal life ==
Morris was privately educated at Abbey Gate College and King's School, Chester. In 2018, he participated in the fourth season of Celebs Go Dating.

== Racing record ==
=== Career summary ===
Season	Series	Team	Races	Wins	Poles	F/Laps	Podiums	Points	Position
2010	Ginetta Junior Championship	Hillspeed	20	0	0	0	1	185	12th
2010	Ginetta Junior Winter Series	Hillspeed	4	2	0	3	3	123	**1st**
2011	Ginetta Junior Championship	Hillspeed	20	11	6	6	16	562	**1st**
2012	Formula Renault BARC	Fortec Motorsports	14	5	7	4	6	274	**3rd**
2012	Formula Renault BARC Winter Series	Fortec Motorsports	4	2	2	1	2	113	**1st**
2012	Formula Renault 2.0 NEC	Fortec Motorsports	2	0	0	0	0	10	43rd
2013	BRDC Formula 4 Championship	Hillspeed	24	1	0	1	10	410	**2nd**
2014	Formula Renault 2.0 NEC	Fortec Motorsports	15	2	3	1	5	224	**3rd**
2014	Formula Renault 2.0 Alps	Fortec Motorsports	4	0	0	0	0	31	15th
2015	GP3 Series	Status Grand Prix	18	0	0	0	0	6	18th
2016	British GT Championship	Team Parker Racing	9	1	4	1	6	143	**3rd**
2017	British GT Championship	Team Parker Racing	10	3	3	1	4	200	**1st**
2017	IMSA SportsCar Championship	Whelen Engineering Racing	1	0	0	0	0	25	32nd
2017	International GT Open	Wessex Vehicles	3	1	0	0	1	23	18th
2018	Blancpain GT Series Endurance Cup	Team Parker Racing	5	0	0	0	0	0	NC
2018	Blancpain GT Series Endurance Cup - Pro-Am	Team Parker Racing	5	0	0	1	2	43	9th
2018	British GT Championship	Team Parker Racing	1	0	0	0	0	12	16th
2018	Intercontinental GT Challenge	Team Parker Racing	1	0	0	0	0	0	NC
2019	British GT Championship	JRM Racing	9	1	0	0	1	58	11th
2019	Blancpain GT Series Endurance Cup	M-Sport Team Bentley	1	0	0	0	0	0	NC
2019	Blancpain GT Series Endurance Cup	Team Parker Racing	4	0	0	0	0	0	NC
2019	Blancpain GT Series Endurance Cup - Pro-Am	Team Parker Racing	4	0	0	1	0	28	12th
2019	Intercontinental GT Challenge	Bentley Team M-Sport	2	0	0	1	0	0	NC
2020	GT World Challenge Europe Endurance Cup	CMR	4	0	0	0	0	0	NC
2020	Intercontinental GT Challenge	Bentley Team M-Sport	2	0	0	0	0	2	20th
2020	Intercontinental GT Challenge	CMR	1	0	0	0	0	2	20th
2020	ADAC GT Masters	T3-HRT-Motorsport	2	0	0	0	0	0	NC
2021	24H GT Series - GT3	Leipert Motorsport							
2022	Porsche Carrera Cup GB	Team Parker Racing	6	0	0	0	0	9	12th
2023	GT Cup Championship - Group GTH	Ram Racing	12	4	5	3	7	0	NC†
2024	British GT Championship - GT4	Team Parker Racing	9	1	1	1	4	136	**3rd**
2024	GT Cup Championship - Group GTH	Team Parker Racing							
2025	British GT Championship - GT4	Team Parker Racing	4	0	0	0	2	76.5	6th

=== Complete Formula Renault 2.0 NEC results ===
(key) (Races in bold indicate pole position) (Races in italics indicate fastest lap)

Year	Entrant	1	2	3	4	5	6	7	8	9	10	11	12	13	14	15	16	17	18	19	20	DC	Points
2012	Fortec Motorsports	HOC; 1	HOC; 2	HOC; 3	NÜR; 1	NÜR; 2	OSC; 1	OSC; 2	OSC; 3	ASS; 1	ASS; 2	RBR; 1	RBR; 2	MST; 1	MST; 2	MST; 3	ZAN; 1	ZAN; 2	ZAN; 3	SPA; 1; 23	SPA; 2; 11	43rd	10
2014	Fortec Motorsports	MNZ; 1; 15	MNZ; 2; 7	SIL; 1; 14	**SIL**; **2**; 1	HOC; 1; 21	HOC; 2; 5	HOC; 3; 9	SPA; 1; 8	SPA; 2 Ret	ASS; 1; 4	**ASS**; **2**; 1	**MST**; **1**; 3	MST; 2; 3	MST; 3 C	NÜR; 1; 2	NÜR; 2; 6	NÜR; 3 C				3rd	224

=== Complete Formula Renault 2.0 Alps Series results ===
(key) (Races in bold indicate pole position; races in italics indicate fastest lap)

Year	Team	1	2	3	4	5	6	7	8	9	10	11	12	13	14	Pos	Points
2014	Fortec Motorsports	IMO; 1; 12	IMO; 2; 3	PAU; 1	PAU; 2	RBR; 1	RBR; 2	SPA; 1; 6	SPA; 2 Ret	MNZ; 1	MNZ; 2	MUG; 1	MUG; 2	JER; 1	JER; 2	15th	31

=== Complete GP3 Series results ===
(key) (Races in bold indicate pole position) (Races in italics indicate fastest lap)

Year	Entrant	1	2	3	4	5	6	7	8	9	10	11	12	13	14	15	16	17	18	Pos	Points
2015	Status Grand Prix	CAT; FEA; Ret	CAT; SPR; 24	RBR; FEA; 19	RBR; SPR; 5	SIL; FEA; 12	SIL; SPR; 12	HUN; FEA; 12	HUN; SPR; 12	SPA; FEA; Ret	SPA; SPR; 14	MNZ; FEA; DSQ	MNZ; SPR; Ret	SOC; FEA; 14	SOC; SPR; 10	BHR; FEA; 16	BHR; SPR; Ret	YMC; FEA; 13	YMC; SPR; 15	18th	6

=== Complete British GT Championship results ===
(key) (Races in bold indicate pole position) (Races in italics indicate fastest lap)

Year	Team	Car	Class	1	2	3	4	5	6	7	8	9	10	DC	Points
2016	Team Parker Racing	Bentley Continental GT3	GT3	**BRH**; **1**; 2	ROC; 1; 10	OUL; 1; 3	**OUL**; **2**; 1	**SIL**; **1** Ret	**SPA**; **1**; 2	SNE; 1; 3	SNE; 2; 5	DON; 1; 3		3rd	143
2017	Team Parker Racing	Bentley Continental GT3	GT3	**OUL**; **1**; 4	**OUL**; **2**; 5	ROC; 1; 1	SNE; 1; 7	SNE; 2; 4	SIL; 1; 1	**SPA**; **1**; 5	SPA; 2; 7	BRH; 1; 1	DON; 1; 3	1st	200
2018	Team Parker Racing	Bentley Continental GT3	GT3	OUL; 1	OUL; 2	ROC; 1	SNE; 1	SNE; 2	SIL; 1; 6	SPA; 1	BRH; 1	DON; 1		16th	12
2019	JRM Racing	Bentley Continental GT3	GT3	OUL; 1; 1	OUL; 2; 12	SNE; 1; 5	SNE; 2; 12	SIL; 1 DSQ	DON; 1; 7	SPA; 1; 12	BRH; 1; 9	DON; 1; 7		11th	58
2024	Team Parker Racing	Mercedes-AMG GT4	GT4	OUL; 1; 20	**OUL**; **2**; 18	SIL; 1; 23	DON; 1 Ret	SPA; 1; 16	SNE; 1; 16	SNE; 2; 17	DON; 1; 14	BRH; 1; 20		3rd	136
2025	Team Parker Racing	Mercedes-AMG GT4	GT4	DON; 1; 15	SIL; 1; 23	OUL; 1	OUL; 2	SPA; 1; 12	SNE; 1	SNE; 2	BRH; 1	DON; 1; 18		6th	76.5

Sporting positions
Preceded by Aaron Williamson	Ginetta Junior Winter Series; Champion; 2010	Succeeded by George Gamble
Preceded by Tom Ingram	Ginetta Junior Championship; Champion; 2011	Succeeded by Charlie Robertson
Preceded by Victor Jiminez	Formula Renault BARC Winter Series; Champion; 2012	Succeeded by Ben Barnicoat (Autumn Cup)
Preceded by Jonathan Adam; Derek Johnston	British GT Championship; Champion; 2017; With: Rick Parfitt Jr.	Succeeded by Jonathan Adam; Flick Haigh
Preceded by Jonathan Adam; Derek Johnston	British GT Championship; Pro-Am Champion; 2017; With: Rick Parfitt Jr.	Succeeded by Jonathan Adam; Flick Haigh
Preceded by Michael Johnston; Chris Salkeld	British GT Championship; GT4 Pro-Am Champion; 2024; With: Charles Dawson	Succeeded by Jack Brown; Marc Warren
