= 2024 Porsche Carrera Cup Great Britain =

Motor racing competition

The 2024 Porsche Carrera Cup Great Britain is a multi-event, one-make motor racing championship held across England and Scotland. The championship featured a mix of professional motor racing teams and privately funded drivers. It formed part of the extensive program of support categories built up around the BTCC centrepiece.

== Team and drivers ==
Team	No.	Driver	R	Rounds
Pro Class
Team Parker Racing	8	(United Kingdom) Hugo Ellis		All
Team Parker Racing	35	(United Kingdom) Matthew Rees	R	All
Eden Race Drive	10	(United Kingdom) William Martin		All
Eden Race Drive	16	(United Kingdom) Harry Foster		All
Eden Race Drive	57	(United Kingdom) Aiden Neate		7–8
Eden Race Drive	90	(United Kingdom) Josh Malin		1–2
Parker Classic Works	12	(United Kingdom) Stephen Jelley		All
Rosland Gold by Century Motorsport	14	(United Kingdom) Will Burns		All
Rosland Gold by Century Motorsport	42	(United Kingdom) George Gamble		All
JTR	40	(South Africa) Andrew Rackstraw	R	All
JTR	50	(United Kingdom) James Wallis		All
Cognition Land & Water with CCK Motorsport	99	(United Kingdom) Charles Rainford		All
Toro Verde GT	123	(United Kingdom) Daniel Lloyd		All
Pro-Am Class
Toro Verde GT	17	(Republic of Ireland) Karl Leonard		7
Toro Verde GT	29	(United Kingdom) Ross Wylie		1–5
Toro Verde GT	96	(United Kingdom) Jack Butel		1–2
Eden Race Drive	24	(United Kingdom) William Aspin		All
Eden Race Drive	88	(Republic of Ireland) Lucca Allen		6
Eden Race Drive	94	(United Kingdom) Oliver White		All
Rebelleo Motorsport	44	(United Kingdom) Abbie Eaton		All
JTR	48	(United Kingdom) Ollie Jackson		All
JTR	59	(United Kingdom) Josh Stanton		All
Century Motorsport	52	(United Kingdom) Angus Whiteside		All
Century Motorsport	58	(United Kingdom) Henry Dawes		All
Parker Classic Works	66	(United Kingdom) Sid Smith	R	All
Am Class
CCK Motorsport	6	(United Kingdom) Callum Davies		7
Team Parker Racing	7	(United Kingdom) Justin Sherwood		2
Team Parker Racing	73	(United Kingdom) William Paul		3–4, 6–7
Team Parker Racing	80	(United Kingdom) Lee Mowle		1, 3–8
Cognition Land & Water with CCK Motorsport	55	(United Kingdom) Richard Hosking		1–3, 6–8
Toro Verde GT	71	(United Kingdom) David Stirling		2

== Race calendar ==
Round		Circuit	Date
1	R1	Donington Park (National Circuit, Leicestershire)	27–28 April
1	R2	Donington Park (National Circuit, Leicestershire)	27–28 April
2	R3	Brands Hatch (Indy Circuit, Kent)	11–12 May
2	R4	Brands Hatch (Indy Circuit, Kent)	11–12 May
3	R5	Thruxton Circuit (Hampshire)	8–9 June
3	R6	Thruxton Circuit (Hampshire)	8–9 June
4	R7	Croft Circuit (North Yorkshire)	27–28 July
4	R8	Croft Circuit (North Yorkshire)	27–28 July
5	R9	Knockhill Racing Circuit (Fife)	10–11 August
5	R10	Knockhill Racing Circuit (Fife)	10–11 August
6	R11	Donington Park (Grand Prix Circuit, Leicestershire)	24–25 August
6	R12	Donington Park (Grand Prix Circuit, Leicestershire)	24–25 August
7	R13	Silverstone Circuit (National Circuit, Northamptonshire)	21–22 September
7	R14	Silverstone Circuit (National Circuit, Northamptonshire)	21–22 September
8	R15	Brands Hatch (Grand Prix Circuit, Kent)	5–6 October
8	R16	Brands Hatch (Grand Prix Circuit, Kent)	5–6 October

== Results and standings ==
Points system
	1st	2nd	3rd	4th	5th	6th	7th	8th	PP	FL
Race 1 (Pro)	12	10	8	6	4	3	2	1	2	1
Race 2 (All Classes)	10	8	6	5	4	3	2	1	0	1

=== Drivers' championships ===
Pos	Driver	DON		BHI			THR		CRO		KNO		DON		SIL		BHGP		Pts
Pro Class
1	(United Kingdom) George Gamble	2	C	2	Ret	4	2	2	Ret	18	5	1	8	2	3	2	6	1	105
2	(United Kingdom) Charles Rainford	4	C	4	2	5	6	5	3	2	1	6	9	6	1	10	2	8	98
3	(United Kingdom) Hugo Ellis	Ret	C	9	1	3	8	8	1	4	2	4	1	3	8	12	3	Ret	95
4	(United Kingdom) Will Martin	1	C	3	6	1	1	4	2	3	10	20	10	4	3	11	Ret	10	93
5	(United Kingdom) Matthew Rees	11	C	15	5	2	7	7	4	1	3	3	5	7	10	13	10	14	62
6	(United Kingdom) Harry Foster	10	C	10	8	6	3	3	15	13	Ret	12	4	1	7	14	1	15	55
7	(United Kingdom) James Wallis	7	C	Ret	3	15	10	12	6	6	6	5	11	Ret	Ret	5	4	2	44
8	(South Africa) Andrew Rackstraw	5	C	6	Ret	10	4	1	5	20	15	10	6	Ret	9	17	11	6	42
9	(United Kingdom) Daniel Lloyd	12	C	12	12	8	5	6	8	7	13	9	12	12	6	3	5	5	39
10	(United Kingdom) Will Burns	9	C	8	Ret	DNS	17	13	11	10	7	7	3	5	12	6	18	4	39
11	(United Kingdom) Stephen Jelley	Ret	C	11	4	7	14	16	7	5	16	Ret	14	10	11	16	9	3	23
12	(United Kingdom) Josh Malin	6	C	5	10	12													10
Guest drivers ineligible for points
-	(United Kingdom) Aiden Neate														15	22	17	17	-
Pro-Am Class
1	(United Kingdom) Angus Whiteside	3	C	1	Ret	DNS	9	9	10	8	11	11	2	14	4	4	8	11	119
2	(United Kingdom) Sid Smith	Ret	C	14	7	9	15	15	19	12	4	2	7	9	Ret	21	7	16	107
3	(United Kingdom) Ollie Jackson	8	C	7	13	13	16	14	9	9	14	17	18	Ret	13	20	15	7	82
4	(United Kingdom) Oliver White	15	C	13	9	Ret	13	11	12	11	9	8	19	17	14	19	12	9	80
5	(United Kingdom) Josh Stanton	Ret	C	18	11	11	19	19	18	16	8	13	15	13	19	24	14	13	57
6	(United Kingdom) Abbie Eaton	17	C	16	16	17	18	18	14	19	18	16	16	Ret	2	1	19	12	55
7	(United Kingdom) Will Aspin	Ret	C	DNS	Ret	Ret	11	10	16	15	DSQ	15	13	8	18	15	13	Ret	48
8	(United Kingdom) Ross Wylie	13	C	17	15	Ret	12	17	13	14	12	14							40
9	(United Kingdom) Henry Dawes	16	C	21	14	16	20	20	17	17	17	18	17	13	16	8	16	Ret	37
10	(United Kingdom) Jack Butel	14	C	Ret	17	14													9
Guest drivers ineligible for points
-	(Republic of Ireland) Karl Leonard														17	7			-
-	(Republic of Ireland) Lucca Allen												20	Ret					-
Am Class
1	(United Kingdom) Lee Mowle	18	C				21	21	20	21	19	19	21	15	21	23	20	18	151
2	(United Kingdom) Richard Hosking	WD	WD	23	20	19	22	23					22	16	Ret	18	21	19	68
3	(United Kingdom) William Paul						Ret	22	21	22			WD	WD	22	9			44
4	(United Kingdom) Justin Sherwood			20	18	18													35
5	(United Kingdom) David Stirling			22	19	Ret													8
Guest drivers ineligible for points
-	(United Kingdom) Callum Davies														20	25			-
