= 2011 Ginetta Junior Championship =

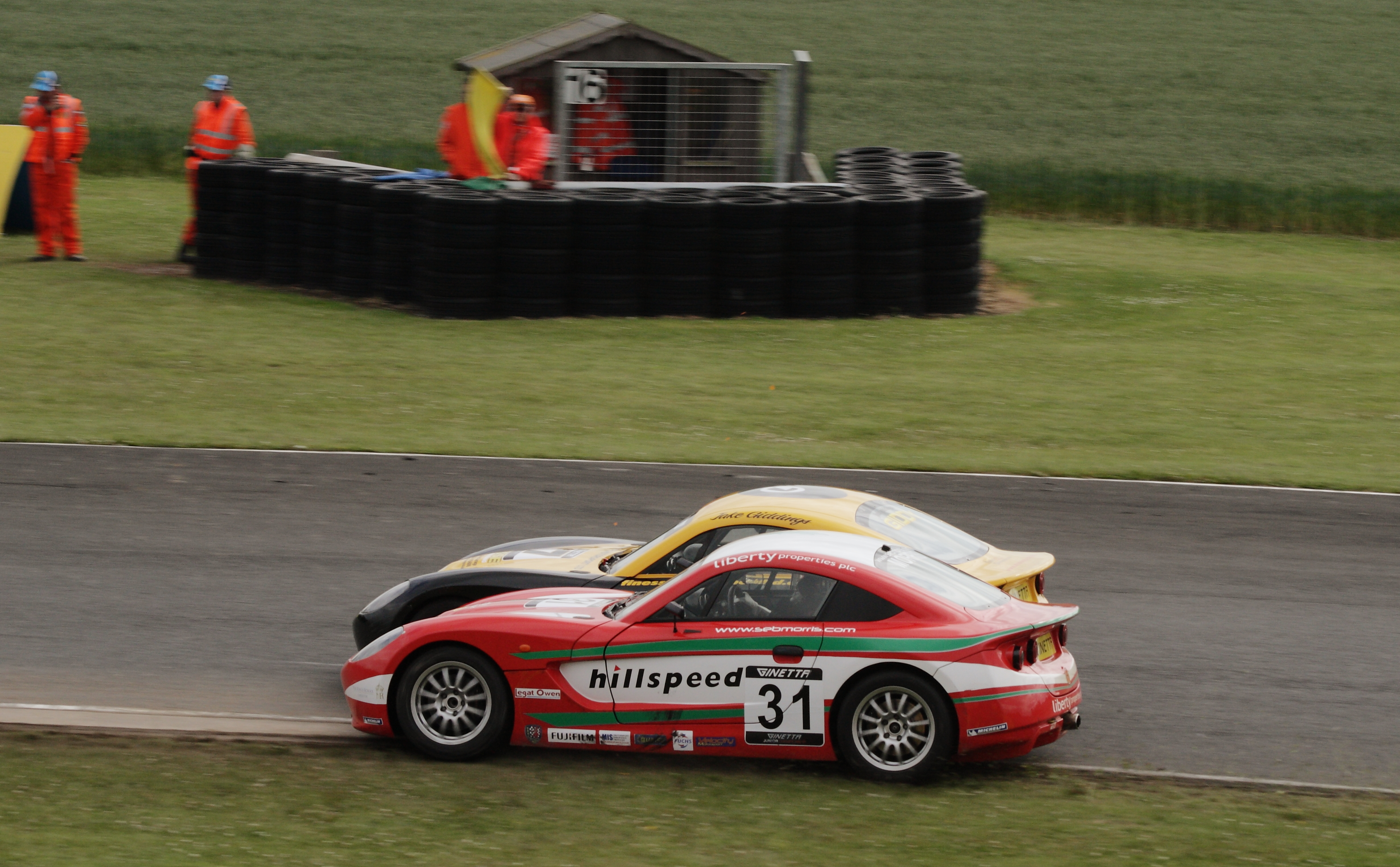
2011 champion Seb Morris side-by-side with Jake Giddings at Croft

The 2011 Ginetta Junior Championship season was the ninth season of the Ginetta Junior Championship series for junior drivers aged 14 to 17. The series was based in the United Kingdom and gives aspiring racing drivers aged between 14 and 17 the chance to take their first steps up the motor racing ladder.

The 2011 season commenced on 3 April 2011 at Brands Hatch and concluded on 16 October 2011 at Silverstone, after twenty races to be held at ten meetings in support of the 2011 British Touring Car Championship.

== Teams and drivers ==
Team	No.	Drivers	Rounds
Hillspeed	3	(United Kingdom) Will Palmer	6, 9–10
Hillspeed	25	(United Kingdom) Struan Moore	1–8, 10
Hillspeed	31	(United Kingdom) Seb Morris	All
Beacon Racing	5	(Republic of Ireland) Niall Murray	All
FML	7	(United Kingdom) Jake Giddings	All
Privateer	8	(United Kingdom) Finlay Ractliffe	2–3
Privateer	71	(United Kingdom) Max Coates	All
Rollcentre	12	(United Kingdom) Eric Morris	1–4
TJ Motorsport	14	(United Kingdom) Declan Jones	10
TJ Motorsport	21	(United Kingdom) George Gamble	All
TJ Motorsport	40	(United Kingdom) Sennan Fielding	All
TJ Motorsport	84	(United Kingdom) Brad Bailey	All
Kelvin Jones Motorsport	14	(United Kingdom) Declan Jones	1–7
Kelvin Jones Motorsport	22	(Northern Ireland) Patrick McClughan	1–3
Westbourne Motorsport	14	(United Kingdom) Declan Jones	8–9
Westbourne Motorsport	95	(United Kingdom) Myles Collins	1–6
Tollbar Racing with WIRED	20	(United Kingdom) Tom Howard	All
Tollbar Racing with WIRED	41	(United Kingdom) William Foster	All
HHC	22	(Northern Ireland) Patrick McClughan	4–6, 8–10
HHC	54	(Northern Ireland) Andrew Watson	10
HHC	55	(United Kingdom) Charlie Robertson	All
HHC	79	(United Kingdom) Michael Day	1–6
HHC	95	(United Kingdom) Myles Collins	7–9
JHR	33	(United Kingdom) Ollie Chadwick	2–10
JHR	34	(United Kingdom) Christie Doran	7

== Race calendar and results ==
All rounds were held in the United Kingdom. The series supported the British Touring Car Championship at all rounds.

Round		Circuit	Date	Pole position	Fastest lap	Winning driver	Winning team
1	R1	Brands Hatch (Indy), Kent	3 April	(United Kingdom) Jake Giddings	(United Kingdom) Charlie Robertson	(United Kingdom) Seb Morris	Hillspeed
1	R2	Brands Hatch (Indy), Kent	3 April	(United Kingdom) Seb Morris	(United Kingdom) Charlie Robertson	(United Kingdom) Seb Morris	Hillspeed
2	R3	Donington Park, Leicestershire	16 April	(United Kingdom) Seb Morris	(United Kingdom) Seb Morris	(United Kingdom) Seb Morris	Hillspeed
2	R4	Donington Park, Leicestershire	17 April	(United Kingdom) Seb Morris	(United Kingdom) George Gamble	(United Kingdom) Seb Morris	Hillspeed
3	R5	Thruxton Circuit, Hampshire	30 April	(United Kingdom) George Gamble	(United Kingdom) Seb Morris	(United Kingdom) George Gamble	TJ Motorsport
3	R6	Thruxton Circuit, Hampshire	1 May	(United Kingdom) George Gamble	(United Kingdom) Seb Morris	(United Kingdom) Seb Morris	Hillspeed
4	R7	Oulton Park, Cheshire	4 June	(United Kingdom) Seb Morris	(United Kingdom) Seb Morris	(United Kingdom) Seb Morris	Hillspeed
4	R8	Oulton Park, Cheshire	5 June	(United Kingdom) Seb Morris	(Republic of Ireland) Niall Murray	(United Kingdom) Seb Morris	Hillspeed
5	R9	Croft Circuit, North Yorkshire	19 June	(United Kingdom) Charlie Robertson	(United Kingdom) Charlie Robertson	(United Kingdom) George Gamble	TJ Motorsport
5	R10	Croft Circuit, North Yorkshire	19 June	(United Kingdom) Charlie Robertson	(United Kingdom) Seb Morris	(United Kingdom) Charlie Robertson	HHC Motorsport
6	R11	Snetterton Motor Racing Circuit, Norfolk	7 August	(United Kingdom) Charlie Robertson	(United Kingdom) Charlie Robertson	(United Kingdom) Seb Morris	Hillspeed
6	R12	Snetterton Motor Racing Circuit, Norfolk	7 August	(United Kingdom) Seb Morris	(United Kingdom) Seb Morris	(United Kingdom) Seb Morris	Hillspeed
7	R13	Knockhill Racing Circuit, Fife	3 September	(United Kingdom) George Gamble	(United Kingdom) Struan Moore	(United Kingdom) Seb Morris	Hillspeed
7	R14	Knockhill Racing Circuit, Fife	4 September	(United Kingdom) George Gamble	(United Kingdom) Struan Moore	(United Kingdom) George Gamble	TJ Motorsport
8	R15	Rockingham Motor Speedway, Northamptonshire	17 September	(United Kingdom) Charlie Robertson	(United Kingdom) Charlie Robertson	(United Kingdom) Seb Morris	Hillspeed
8	R16	Rockingham Motor Speedway, Northamptonshire	18 September	(United Kingdom) Charlie Robertson	(United Kingdom) Sennan Fielding	(United Kingdom) Charlie Robertson	HHC Motorsport
9	R17	Brands Hatch (GP), Kent	1 October	(United Kingdom) George Gamble	(United Kingdom) Sennan Fielding	(Republic of Ireland) Niall Murray	Beacon Racing
9	R18	Brands Hatch (GP), Kent	2 October	(United Kingdom) George Gamble	(Republic of Ireland) Niall Murray	(United Kingdom) Charlie Robertson	HHC Motorsport
10	R19	Silverstone (National), Northamptonshire	15 October	(United Kingdom) Brad Bailey	(United Kingdom) Brad Bailey	(United Kingdom) Sennan Fielding	TJ Motorsport
10	R20	Silverstone (National), Northamptonshire	16 October	(United Kingdom) Brad Bailey	(United Kingdom) William Foster	(Republic of Ireland) Niall Murray	Beacon Racing

== Standings ==
Pos	Driver	BHI		DON		THR		OUL		CRO		SNE		KNO		ROC		BHGP		SIL		Total	Drop	Pen	Pts
1	(United Kingdom) Seb Morris	1	1	1	1	2	1	1	1	4	5	1	1	1	6	1	4	2	2	3	2	625	39	24	562
2	(United Kingdom) Charlie Robertson	4	5	2	DSQ	6	10	2	4	2	1	2	4	5	3	8	1	4	1	6	3	476	27	12	437
3	(United Kingdom) George Gamble	6	6	5	5	1	2	3	3	1	13	11	2	2	1	Ret	5	Ret	DNS	4	9	402	1	18	383
4	(Republic of Ireland) Niall Murray	7	8	3	8	Ret	NC	8	2	13	4	Ret	10	6	4	2	2	1	3	2	1	383		27	356
5	(United Kingdom) William Foster	5	3	4	2	10	8	6	5	3	3	4	9	7	Ret	6	12	Ret	Ret	8	5	325		15	310
6	(United Kingdom) Max Coates	9	4	6	4	3	3	17	7	5	9	6	11	10	8	4	13	3	6	9	11	327	12	6	309
7	(United Kingdom) Sennan Fielding	Ret	7	Ret	12	5	7	4	8	10	10	12	7	4	9	3	3	9	Ret	1	15	285			285
8	(United Kingdom) Tom Howard	3	2	Ret	3	16	5	9	6	6	2	5	6	Ret	Ret	11	8	Ret	Ret	Ret	7	263		15	248
9	(United Kingdom) Brad Bailey	Ret	10	Ret	13	4	4	7	11	Ret	8	8	8	8	10	9	15	6	4	5	10	248		9	239
10	(United Kingdom) Jake Giddings	2	Ret	10	15	9	13	5	Ret	7	12	3	5	Ret	DNS	10	11	5	5	12	14	236		9	227
11	(United Kingdom) Myles Collins	Ret	11	12	6	7	11	13	12	11	6	9	15	9	7	5	6	Ret	7			208			208
12	(United Kingdom) Struan Moore	Ret	Ret	11	Ret	8	Ret	16	DNS	8	7	7	3	3	2	Ret	14			7	4	204		9	195
13	(United Kingdom) Declan Jones	Ret	Ret	14	10	13	9	12	9	15	14	13	13	11	5	Ret	7	10	9	14	13	172			172
14	(United Kingdom) Patrick McClughan	8	Ret	9	9	11	14	11	15	9	Ret	15	14			7	10	8	DSQ	13	8	159			159
15	(United Kingdom) Ollie Chadwick			Ret	11	15	16	15	14	12	11	10	12	12	11	12	9	7	Ret	15	12	144			144
16	(United Kingdom) Michael Day	11	9	8	7	12	6	14	10	14	Ret	Ret	16									109			109
17	(United Kingdom) Eric Morris	10	Ret	13	14	14	12	10	13													61			61
18	(United Kingdom) Will Palmer											14	17					11	8	10	Ret	46			46
19	(United Kingdom) Andrew Watson																			11	6	28			28
20	(United Kingdom) Finlay Ractliffe			7	Ret	Ret	15															22			22
21	(United Kingdom) Christie Doran													13	Ret							8			8
Pos	Driver	BHI		DON		THR		OUL		CRO		SNE		KNO		ROC		BHGP		SIL		Total	Drop	Pen	Pts

Colour	Result
Gold	Winner
Silver	Second place
Bronze	Third place
Green	Points classification
Blue	Non-points classification
Blue	Non-classified finish (NC)
Purple	Retired, not classified (Ret)
Red	Did not qualify (DNQ)
Red	Did not pre-qualify (DNPQ)
Black	Disqualified (DSQ)
White	Did not start (DNS)
White	Withdrew (WD)
White	Race cancelled (C)
Blank	Did not practice (DNP)
Blank	Did not arrive (DNA)
Blank	Excluded (EX)
