= 2022 Mini Challenge UK =

Motor racing competition

The 2022 Quaife Mini Challenge season was the twenty first season of the Mini Challenge UK. The season began on 23 April at Donington Park and ended on 9 October at Brands Hatch. It included twenty rounds across the UK, all the JCW Class races and 3 of the Cooper Class races support the British Touring Car Championship

== Mini Challenge UK ==
The 2022 Quaife Mini Challenge UK ran 7 rounds of the JCW class, all in support of the British Touring Car Championship.

=== Teams and drivers ===
Team	No.	Driver	Rounds
EXCELR8 Motorsport	1	(United Kingdom) Dan Zelos	All
EXCELR8 Motorsport	4	(United Kingdom) Liam Lambert	5
EXCELR8 Motorsport	7	(Hungary) Gergő Rácz R	All
EXCELR8 Motorsport	10	(United Kingdom) Bradley Gravett G	6–7
EXCELR8 Motorsport	23	(United Kingdom) Ethan Hammerton	All
EXCELR8 Motorsport	61	(United Kingdom) Harry Nunn R	6–7
EXCELR8 Motorsport	66	(United Kingdom) Ronan Pearson	All
EXCELR8 Motorsport	72	(United Kingdom) Joshua Jackson R	All
EXCELR8 Motorsport	315	(United Kingdom) Jason Lockwood	All
Hybrid Tune	2	(United Kingdom) Matthew George	6–7
Hybrid Tune	8	(United Kingdom) Hannah Chapman	1–3
Hybrid Tune	11	(United Kingdom) Sam Weller G	All
Hybrid Tune	20	(United Kingdom) Kyle Reid	4–5
Hybrid Tune	24	(United Kingdom) Joe Tanner D	All
Hybrid Tune	42	(United Kingdom) Sam Smith R	6
Hybrid Tune	63	(United Kingdom) Taylor Whitson R	1–3
Hybrid Tune	3	(United Kingdom) Ross Marshall D R	7
Graves Motorsport	3	(United Kingdom) Ross Marshall D R	1–6
Graves Motorsport	10	(United Kingdom) Bradley Gravett G	1–5
Graves Motorsport	14	(United Kingdom) Dominic Wheatley R	All
Graves Motorsport	33	(Republic of Ireland) Alex Denning R	All
Graves Motorsport	39	(United Kingdom) Lewis Brown	All
Graves Motorsport	61	(United Kingdom) Harry Nunn R	1–5
Graves Motorsport	71	(United Kingdom) Max Coates R	All
Graves Motorsport	5	(United Kingdom) James Griffith D	7
LDR Performance Tuning	5	(United Kingdom) James Griffith D	1–6
LDR Performance Tuning	29	(United Kingdom) Leonardo Panayiotou R	1–3, 5
Autotech Motorsport	9	(United Kingdom) Bill Hardy D	All
J W Bird Motorsport	19	(United Kingdom) Jack Mitchell	All
J W Bird Motorsport	52	(United Kingdom) Ru Clark G	1–4
J W Bird Motorsport	77	(United Kingdom) Jamie Osborne R	All
LUX Motorsport	13	(United Kingdom) Ryan Faulconbridge	All
LUX Motorsport	21	(United Kingdom) Jack Davidson R	All
LUX Motorsport	22	(United Kingdom) Barry Ward D R	2–3, 5–6
LUX Motorsport	27	(United Kingdom) David Stirling D R	2–4, 6–7
LUX Motorsport	777	(United Kingdom) Kenan Dole R	All
Lydia Walmsley Racing	82	(United Kingdom) Lydia Walmsley G	All
Robbie Dalgleish Racing	91	(United Kingdom) Robbie Dalgleish	1–6

Icon	Legend
R	Rookie
D	Director
G	Graduate

=== Race calendar and results ===
Round		Circuit	Date	Pole position	Fastest lap	Winning driver	Winning team	Rookie Winner	Graduate Winner	Directors Winner
1	R1	Donington Park (National Circuit, Leicestershire)	23 April	(United Kingdom) Lewis Brown	(United Kingdom) Lewis Brown	(United Kingdom) Sam Weller	Hybrid Tune	(Republic of Ireland) Alex Denning	(United Kingdom) Sam Weller	(United Kingdom) Joe Tanner
1	R2	Donington Park (National Circuit, Leicestershire)	24 April		(United Kingdom) Jack Mitchell	(United Kingdom) Sam Weller	Hybrid Tune	(United Kingdom) Jamie Osborne	(United Kingdom) Sam Weller	(United Kingdom) James Griffith
1	R3	Donington Park (National Circuit, Leicestershire)	24 April		(United Kingdom) Ronan Pearson	(United Kingdom) Ronan Pearson	Excelr8 Motorsport	(Republic of Ireland) Alex Denning	(United Kingdom) Sam Weller	(United Kingdom) Joe Tanner
2	R4	Brands Hatch (Indy Circuit, Kent)	14 May	(United Kingdom) Jack Mitchell	(United Kingdom) Sam Weller	(United Kingdom) Jack Mitchell	J W Bird Motorsport	(Republic of Ireland) Alex Denning	(United Kingdom) Sam Weller	(United Kingdom) Joe Tanner
2	R5	Brands Hatch (Indy Circuit, Kent)	15 May		(United Kingdom) Max Coates	(United Kingdom) Jack Mitchell	J W Bird Motorsport	(Republic of Ireland) Alex Denning	(United Kingdom) Sam Weller	(United Kingdom) Joe Tanner
2	R6	Brands Hatch (Indy Circuit, Kent)	15 May		(United Kingdom) Max Coates	(United Kingdom) Max Coates	Graves Motorsport	(Republic of Ireland) Alex Denning	(United Kingdom) Sam Weller	(United Kingdom) Joe Tanner
3	R7	Oulton Park (Cheshire)	11 June	(United Kingdom) Sam Weller	(United Kingdom) Sam Weller	(United Kingdom) Sam Weller	Hybrid Tune	(Republic of Ireland) Alex Denning	(United Kingdom) Sam Weller	(United Kingdom) Joe Tanner
3	R8	Oulton Park (Cheshire)	12 June		(United Kingdom) Jason Lockwood	(United Kingdom) Jason Lockwood	Excelr8 Motorsport	(Republic of Ireland) Alex Denning	(United Kingdom) Sam Weller	(United Kingdom) Joe Tanner
4	R9	Knockhill Racing Circuit (Fife)	30 July	(United Kingdom) Ronan Pearson	(United Kingdom) Ronan Pearson	(United Kingdom) Ronan Pearson	Excelr8 Motorsport	(Republic of Ireland) Alex Denning	(United Kingdom) Sam Weller	(United Kingdom) Joe Tanner
4	R10	Knockhill Racing Circuit (Fife)	31 July		(United Kingdom) Sam Weller	(United Kingdom) Ronan Pearson	Excelr8 Motorsport	(Republic of Ireland) Alex Denning	(United Kingdom) Sam Weller	(United Kingdom) Joe Tanner
4	R11	Knockhill Racing Circuit (Fife)	31 July		(United Kingdom) Dan Zelos	(Republic of Ireland) Alex Denning	Graves Motorsport	(Republic of Ireland) Alex Denning	(United Kingdom) Sam Weller	(United Kingdom) James Griffith
5	R12	Snetterton Motor Racing Circuit (300 Circuit, Norfolk)	13 August	(Republic of Ireland) Alex Denning	(Republic of Ireland) Alex Denning	(Republic of Ireland) Alex Denning	Graves Motorsport	(Republic of Ireland) Alex Denning	(United Kingdom) Sam Weller	(United Kingdom) Liam Lambert
5	R13	Snetterton Motor Racing Circuit (300 Circuit, Norfolk)	14 August		(United Kingdom) Sam Weller	(Republic of Ireland) Alex Denning	Graves Motorsport	(Republic of Ireland) Alex Denning	(United Kingdom) Sam Weller	(United Kingdom) Liam Lambert
5	R14	Snetterton Motor Racing Circuit (300 Circuit, Norfolk)	14 August		(United Kingdom) Sam Weller	(United Kingdom) Jack Mitchell	J W Bird Motorsport	(Hungary) Gergő Rácz	(United Kingdom) Sam Weller	(United Kingdom) Joe Tanner
6	R15	Silverstone Circuit (National Circuit, Northamptonshire)	24 September	(United Kingdom) Sam Weller	(United Kingdom) Ronan Pearson	(Republic of Ireland) Alex Denning	Graves Motorsport	(Republic of Ireland) Alex Denning	(United Kingdom) Sam Weller	(United Kingdom) Joe Tanner
6	R16	Silverstone Circuit (National Circuit, Northamptonshire)	25 September		(United Kingdom) Ronan Pearson	(Republic of Ireland) Alex Denning	Graves Motorsport	(Republic of Ireland) Alex Denning	(United Kingdom) Sam Weller	(United Kingdom) James Griffith
6	R17	Silverstone Circuit (National Circuit, Northamptonshire)	25 September		(United Kingdom) Ronan Pearson	(United Kingdom) Sam Weller	Hybrid Tune	(United Kingdom) Sam Smith	(United Kingdom) Sam Weller	(United Kingdom) James Griffith
7	R18	Brands Hatch (Grand Prix Circuit, Kent)	8 October	(Republic of Ireland) Alex Denning	(Republic of Ireland) Alex Denning	(Republic of Ireland) Alex Denning	Graves Motorsport	(Republic of Ireland) Alex Denning	(United Kingdom) Sam Weller	(United Kingdom) Joe Tanner
7	R19	Brands Hatch (Grand Prix Circuit, Kent)	9 October		(Republic of Ireland) Alex Denning	(Republic of Ireland) Alex Denning	Graves Motorsport	(Republic of Ireland) Alex Denning	(United Kingdom) Sam Weller	(United Kingdom) Joe Tanner
7	R20	Brands Hatch (Grand Prix Circuit, Kent)	9 October		(United Kingdom) Sam Smith	(United Kingdom) Sam Smith	Hybrid Tune	(United Kingdom) Sam Smith	(United Kingdom) Sam Weller	(United Kingdom) Joe Tanner

=== Championship standings ===
Scoring system

Championship points were awarded for the all finishing positions in each Championship Race. Entries were required to complete 75% of the winning car's race distance in order to be classified and earn points. There were bonus points awarded for Pole Position and Fastest Lap. Any driver that finishes the race in 20th or below will receive 15 points. Only drivers that do not finish will not score.

Championship Race points

Position	1st	2nd	3rd	4th	5th	6th	7th	8th	9th	10th	11th	12th	13th	14th	15th	16th	17th	18th	19th	20th+	PP	FL
Points	50	44	40	37	34	32	30	28	26	25	24	23	22	21	20	19	18	17	16	15	6	6

=== Drivers' Championships ===
==== JCW Overall standings ====
Pos	Driver	DON			BHI			OUL		KNO			SNE			SIL			BHGP			Total	Pen.	Drop	Points
1	(United Kingdom) Sam Weller	1	1	5	2	4	4	1	3	4	5	3	2	6	5	2	2	1	4	2	3	868		71	797
2	(Republic of Ireland) Alex Denning	3	Ret	10	5	5	3	6	5	5	4	1	1	1	Ret	1	1	13	1	1	6	747			747
3	(United Kingdom) Jack Mitchell	4	3	3	1	1	Ret	2	2	Ret	14	6	4	4	1	6	5	5	2	3	2	728			728
4	(United Kingdom) Ronan Pearson	6	4	1	9	8	6	11	8	1	1	2	6	3	Ret	4	3	2	3	6	Ret	704			704
5	(United Kingdom) Jason Lockwood	5	5	2	3	7	7	4	1	3	2	4	5	2	2	3	4	4	7	Ret	10	722		28	694
6	(United Kingdom) Jack Davidson	2	2	15	11	9	5	7	7	8	8	NC	9	8	4	8	9	14	13	9	5	563		20	543
7	(United Kingdom) Max Coates	24	11	8	7	3	1	9	6	6	6	Ret	7	7	Ret	20	25	15	10	7	4	530			530
8	(United Kingdom) Dan Zelos	7	6	6	4	2	2	5	Ret	Ret	Ret	9	8	5	3	7	7	24	9	8	Ret	520			520
9	(United Kingdom) Joe Tanner	14	Ret	9	10	6	8	3	4	2	3	Ret	WD	13	6	10	Ret	11	5	10	7	490	40		450
10	(United Kingdom) Lewis Brown	23	13	Ret	6	Ret	11	24	25	23	13	8	3	Ret	12	5	6	3	8	5	Ret	436			436
11	(Hungary) Gergő Rácz	Ret	20	11	NC	15	Ret	14	10	13	10	5	10	11	7	9	8	7	21	16	17	408			408
12	(United Kingdom) Robbie Dalgeish	13	7	4	20	17	Ret	10	11	7	12	7	12	10	9	14	11	8				404			404
13	(United Kingdom) Ethan Hammerton	11	12	Ret	Ret	13	10	16	12	11	7	Ret	Ret	20	11	12	10	9	11	18	9	383			383
14	(United Kingdom) Joshua Jackson	18	16	13	8	26	15	13	14	10	11	10	20	16	10	13	22	25	20	21	13	409		30	379
15	(United Kingdom) Bradley Gravett	8	10	7	12	12	Ret	8	9	14	15	12	Ret	Ret	DNS	15	15	22	12	14	16	373			373
16	(United Kingdom) Dominic Wheatley	16	17	Ret	15	11	13	22	Ret	16	23	Ret	14	9	8	16	Ret	26	22	13	15	325			325
17	(United Kingdom) Ryan Faulconbridge	15	25	16	Ret	19	18	Ret	20	18	21	16	17	18	17	23	18	17	24	20	22	314			314
18	(United Kingdom) Kenan Dole	17	14	Ret	14	14	Ret	23	26	Ret	Ret	13	19	14	19	18	24	20	16	15	21	297			297
19	(United Kingdom) Lydia Walmsley	21	19	19	22	23	17	21	17	20	17	11	Ret	WD	WD	Ret	21	16	19	17	11	285			285
20	(United Kingdom) James Griffith	Ret	18	Ret	Ret	22	16	Ret	18	22	20	15	21	19	15	17	17	10	18	Ret	14	279			279
21	(United Kingdom) Ross Marshall	20	Ret	18	19	18	22	19	Ret	17	16	18	Ret	22	Ret	19	20	21	15	12	19	279			279
22	(United Kingdom) Bill Hardy	22	23	20	24	24	19	Ret	24	19	18	Ret	18	23	18	Ret	19	19	Ret	19	18	265			265
23	(United Kingdom) Jamie Osborne	9	9	Ret	Ret	20	14	Ret	19	15	Ret	NC	Ret	21	Ret	11	14	18	14	DSQ	20	245			245
24	(United Kingdom) Ru Clark	10	8	12	16	21	23	12	13	12	9	Ret										220			220
25	(United Kingdom) Harry Nunn	Ret	22	21	18	Ret	Ret	20	Ret	21	22	17	Ret	Ret	Ret	Ret	16	12	17	Ret	12	200			200
26	(United Kingdom) Leonardo Panayiotou	Ret	21	14	13	25	12	18	15				16	15	14							197			197
27	(United Kingdom) Taylor Whitson	12	15	22	17	10	9	Ret	21													141			141
28	(United Kingdom) Hannah Chapman	19	24	17	21	16	21	15	16													137			137
29	(United Kingdom) David Stirling				23	Ret	20	Ret	23	Ret	19	19				24	23	Ret	23	Ret	Ret	123			123
30	(United Kingdom) Barry Ward				Ret	Ret	Ret	17	22				15	Ret	Ret	Ret	Ret	23				70			70
Guest drivers ineligible for points
	(United Kingdom) Sam Smith (R)															21	12	6	6	4	1				
	(United Kingdom) Matthew George															22	13	Ret	Ret	11	8				
	(United Kingdom) Kyle Reid (R)									9	Ret	14	11	17	16										
	(United Kingdom) Liam Lambert (D)												13	12	13										

== Mini Challenge Trophy ==
Team	No.	Driver	Class	Rounds
(United Kingdom) AReeve Motorsport	3	(Canada) Sophie Wright	R	All
(United Kingdom) AReeve Motorsport	33	(United Kingdom) Lauren Tayla	R	7
(United Kingdom) AReeve Motorsport	123	(United Kingdom) Andy Cobb	R D	6–7
(United Kingdom) AReeve Motorsport	199	(United Kingdom) Louie Capozzoli	G	1–5
(United Kingdom) AReeve Motorsport	237	(United Kingdom) Piers Henderson	G	6
(United Kingdom) LDR Performance Tuning	4	(United Kingdom) Mike Paul	D	All
(United Kingdom) LDR Performance Tuning	7	(Republic of Ireland) Mick Fitzgerald	D R	All
(United Kingdom) LDR Performance Tuning	30	(United Kingdom) James Parker	D	All
(United Kingdom) LDR Performance Tuning	32	(United Kingdom) Franklyn Taylor	R	All
(United Kingdom) LDR Performance Tuning	60	(Republic of Ireland) Brendan Fitzgerald	D	All
(United Kingdom) LDR Performance Tuning	77	(United Kingdom) Alexander Jay		1–3
(United Kingdom) MRM	10	(United Kingdom) Tyler Lidsey	G	All
(United Kingdom) MRM	21	(United Kingdom) Nathan Edwards	G	1–3
(United Kingdom) MRM	44	(United Kingdom) Sam Baker	R	4–5, 7
(United Kingdom) Graves Motorsport	12	(United Kingdom) Alex Solley	G	All
(United Kingdom) Graves Motorsport	17	(United Kingdom) Nicky Taylor	G	All
(United Kingdom) Graves Motorsport	27	(United Kingdom) Alfie Glenie		All
(United Kingdom) Graves Motorsport	62	(United Kingdom) Alex Keens	R	5–7
(United Kingdom) Graves Motorsport	71	(United Kingdom) Max Coates	Guest	3
(United Kingdom) Graves Motorsport	86	(United Kingdom) Oliver Meadows	R	All
(United Kingdom) Graves Motorsport	95	(United Kingdom) Nelson King	G	All
(United Kingdom) Graves Motorsport	99	(United Kingdom) Ben Jenkins	G	All
(United Kingdom) Mann Motorsport	20	(United Kingdom) Charlie Mann		All
(United Kingdom) Lee Pearce Racing	23	(United Kingdom) Lee Pearce	D	All
(United Kingdom) Lee Pearce Racing	711	(United Kingdom) Clark Wells	D	All
(United Kingdom) EXCELR8 Motorsport	21	(United Kingdom) Nathan Edwards	G	4, 6–7
(United Kingdom) EXCELR8 Motorsport	24	(United Kingdom) Tom Ovenden	G	All
(United Kingdom) EXCELR8 Motorsport	78	(United Kingdom) Matt Hammond	D	All
(United Kingdom) EXCELR8 Motorsport	81	(United Kingdom) Luca Marinoni Osborne	R	All
(United Kingdom) EXCELR8 Motorsport	96	(United Kingdom) Jordan Kerridge	R	7
(United Kingdom) EXCELR8 Motorsport	98	(United Kingdom) Jonathan Sargeant	G	All
(United Kingdom) PerformanceTek Racing	34	(United Kingdom) John McGladrigan	D G	1–3, 5–7
(United Kingdom) PerformanceTek Racing	38	(United Kingdom) Morgan Wroot		4–7
(United Kingdom) PerformanceTek Racing	65	(United Kingdom) Jack Irvine	R	4
(United Kingdom) PerformanceTek Racing	88	(United Kingdom) Barry Holmes	D G	All
(United Kingdom) Mad4Mini	33	(United Kingdom) Lauren Tayla	R	2–3
(United Kingdom) Mad4Mini	38	(United Kingdom) Morgan Wroot		1–3
(United Kingdom) Pantera Carpentry	41	(United Kingdom) Joe Wiggin	G	All
(United Kingdom) Mannpower Motorsport	46	(United Kingdom) Paul Manning	D	All
(United Kingdom) LUX Motorsport	50	(United Kingdom) David Stirling	Guest	1
(Republic of Ireland) Jack Byrne Motorsport	486	(Republic of Ireland) Jack Byrne	R	All

=== Race calendar and results ===
Round		Circuit	Date	Pole position	Fastest lap	Winning driver	Winning team	Rookie Cup Winner	Graduate Cup Winner	Directors Cup Winner
1	R1	Pembrey Circuit (Carmarthenshire)	6-8 May	(United Kingdom) Matt Hammond	(United Kingdom) Lee Pearce	(United Kingdom) Nelson King	Graves Motorsport	(Republic of Ireland) Jack Byrne	(United Kingdom) Nelson King	(United Kingdom) Matt Hammond
1	R2	Pembrey Circuit (Carmarthenshire)	6-8 May		(United Kingdom) Tom Ovenden	(United Kingdom) Nelson King	Graves Motorsport	(Republic of Ireland) Jack Byrne	(United Kingdom) Nelson King	(United Kingdom) Lee Pearce
1	R3	Pembrey Circuit (Carmarthenshire)	6-8 May		(United Kingdom) Matt Hammond	(United Kingdom) Nelson King	Graves Motorsport	(Republic of Ireland) Jack Byrne	(United Kingdom) Nelson King	(United Kingdom) Lee Pearce
2	R4	Thruxton Circuit (Hampshire)	28-29 May	(United Kingdom) Nelson King	(United Kingdom) Ben Jenkins	(United Kingdom) Nelson King	Graves Motorsport	(Republic of Ireland) Jack Byrne	(United Kingdom) Nelson King	(United Kingdom) Matt Hammond
2	R5	Thruxton Circuit (Hampshire)	28-29 May		(United Kingdom) Alfie Glenie	(United Kingdom) Louie Capozzoli	AReeve Motorsport	(Republic of Ireland) Jack Byrne	(United Kingdom) Louie Capozzoli	(United Kingdom) Lee Pearce
2	R6	Thruxton Circuit (Hampshire)	28-29 May		(United Kingdom) Nelson King	(United Kingdom) Nelson King	Graves Motorsport	(Republic of Ireland) Jack Byrne	(United Kingdom) Nelson King	(United Kingdom) Matt Hammond
3	R7	Croft Circuit (North Yorkshire)	24-26 June	(United Kingdom) Nelson King	(United Kingdom) Nelson King	(United Kingdom) Nelson King	Graves Motorsport	(Republic of Ireland) Jack Byrne	(United Kingdom) Nelson King	(United Kingdom) Matt Hammond
3	R8	Croft Circuit (North Yorkshire)	24-26 June		(United Kingdom) Nelson King	(United Kingdom) Nelson King	Graves Motorsport	(Republic of Ireland) Jack Byrne	(United Kingdom) Nelson King	(United Kingdom) Matt Hammond
4	R9	Thruxton Circuit (Hampshire)	26-28 August	(United Kingdom) Tom Ovenden	(United Kingdom) Nicky Taylor	(United Kingdom) Tom Ovenden	EXCELR8 Motorsport	(Republic of Ireland) Jack Byrne	(United Kingdom) Tom Ovenden	(United Kingdom) Matt Hammond
4	R10	Thruxton Circuit (Hampshire)	26-28 August		(United Kingdom) Nelson King	(United Kingdom) Nelson King	Graves Motorsport	(United Kingdom) Oliver Meadows	(United Kingdom) Nelson King	(United Kingdom) Matt Hammond
5	R11	Snetterton Motor Racing Circuit (300 Circuit, Norfolk)	16-18 September	(United Kingdom) Matt Hammond	(United Kingdom) Tom Ovenden	(United Kingdom) Tom Ovenden	EXCELR8 Motorsport	(Republic of Ireland) Jack Byrne	(United Kingdom) Tom Ovenden	(United Kingdom) Matt Hammond
5	R12	Snetterton Motor Racing Circuit (300 Circuit, Norfolk)	16-18 September		(United Kingdom) Nelson King	(United Kingdom) Nelson King	Graves Motorsport	(Republic of Ireland) Jack Byrne	(United Kingdom) Nelson King	(United Kingdom) Matt Hammond
5	R13	Snetterton Motor Racing Circuit (300 Circuit, Norfolk)	16-18 September		(Republic of Ireland) Jack Byrne	(United Kingdom) Charlie Mann	Mann Motorsport	(Republic of Ireland) Jack Byrne	(United Kingdom) Nelson King	(United Kingdom) Matt Hammond
6	R14	Donington Park (Grand Prix Circuit, Leicestershire)	21-23 October	(United Kingdom) Matt Hammond	(Republic of Ireland) Jack Byrne	(United Kingdom) Matt Hammond	EXCELR8 Motorsport	(Republic of Ireland) Jack Byrne	(United Kingdom) Nelson King	(United Kingdom) Matt Hammond
6	R15	Donington Park (Grand Prix Circuit, Leicestershire)	21-23 October		(Republic of Ireland) Jack Byrne	(United Kingdom) Joe Wiggin	Pantera Carpentry	(Republic of Ireland) Jack Byrne	(United Kingdom) Joe Wiggin	(United Kingdom) Matt Hammond
6	R16	Donington Park (Grand Prix Circuit, Leicestershire)	21-23 October		(United Kingdom) Matt Hammond	(United Kingdom) Matt Hammond	EXCELR8 Motorsport	(Republic of Ireland) Jack Byrne	(United Kingdom) Tom Ovenden	(United Kingdom) Matt Hammond
7	R17	Brands Hatch (Indy Circuit, Kent)	4-6 November	(United Kingdom) Alex Solley	(United Kingdom) Nelson King	(United Kingdom) Nelson King	Graves Motorsport	(Republic of Ireland) Jack Byrne	(United Kingdom) Nelson King	(United Kingdom) Lee Pearce
7	R18	Brands Hatch (Indy Circuit, Kent)	4-6 November		(United Kingdom) Lee Pearce	(United Kingdom) Nelson King	Graves Motorsport	(Republic of Ireland) Jack Byrne	(United Kingdom) Nelson King	(United Kingdom) Lee Pearce
7	R19	Brands Hatch (Indy Circuit, Kent)	4-6 November		(United Kingdom) Nelson King	(United Kingdom) Lee Pearce	Lee Pearce Racing	(Republic of Ireland) Jack Byrne	(United Kingdom) Nelson King	(United Kingdom) Lee Pearce

=== Championship standings ===
Scoring system

Championship points were awarded for the all finishing positions in each Championship Race. Entries were required to complete 75% of the winning car's race distance in order to be classified and earn points. There were bonus points awarded for Pole Position and Fastest Lap. Any driver that finishes the race in 20th or below will receive 15 points. Only drivers that do not finish will not score.

Championship Race points

Position	1st	2nd	3rd	4th	5th	6th	7th	8th	9th	10th	11th	12th	13th	14th	15th	16th	17th	18th	19th	20th+	PP	FL
Points	50	44	40	37	34	32	30	28	26	25	24	23	22	21	20	19	18	17	16	15	6	6

Pos	Driver	PEM			THR1			CRO		THR2		SNE			DON			BHGP			Total	Drop	Pen.	Points
1	(United Kingdom) Nelson King	1	1	1	1	6	1	1	1	4	1	2	1	3	2	5	3	1	1	2	888	57		831
2	(United Kingdom) Matt Hammond	2	14	9	3	7	8	4	8	2	3	4	5	2	1	2	1	10	8	8	694	35		659
3	(United Kingdom) Tom Ovenden	6	5	8	13	16	7	2	2	1	2	1	29	15	4	4	2	5	4	7	654	30		624
4	(United Kingdom) Nicky Taylor	4	2	2	4	11	5	5	3	7	5	3	2	Ret	5	10	Ret	2	10	6	595		50	575
5	(Republic of Ireland) Jack Byrne	12	8	7	14	9	4	7	5	3	8	6	3	4	6	3	4	8	5	5	608.5	39.5		569
6	(United Kingdom) Joe Wiggin	11	12	13	5	10	10	3	4	8	6	5	4	5	3	1	5	9	7	9	588.5	34.5		554
7	(United Kingdom) Charlie Mann	9	6	5	11	5	2	6	6	5	4	9	6	1	Ret	11	9	6	6	3	567	22		545
8	(United Kingdom) Lee Pearce	3	4	4	6	2	18	27	20	9	14	12	26	18	15	7	7	7	2	1	546.5	23.5		523
9	(United Kingdom) Alex Solley	5	3	6	12	3	3	8	16	15	15	8	7	7	7	6	10	4	13	12	539	39		500
10	(United Kingdom) Nathan Edwards	10	10	10	8	12	Ret	13	Ret	16	11	15	10	11	8	8	6	3	3	4	464		20	444
11	(United Kingdom) Alfie Glenie	8	11	12	9	4	13	Ret	DNS	24	17	16	11	10	10	15	17	12	11	10	392			392
12	(United Kingdom) Oliver Meadows	Ret	16	11	21	15	24	9	7	6	7	19	12	13	19	18	13	11	12	16	387.5	7.5		380
13	(United Kingdom) Franklyn Taylor	15	15	20	Ret	20	12	12	12	10	10	7	9	14	9	28	18	15	16	17	371.5	11.5		360
14	(United Kingdom) Morgan Wroot	20	20	18	18	14	Ret	19	14	12	12	11	13	8	DNS	9	27	17	15	15	366	15		351
15	(United Kingdom) Paul Manning	Ret	28	15	7	8	16	16	10	23	16	24	14	9	16	13	11	18	Ret	23	340.5			341
16	(United Kingdom) Luca Marinoni Osborne	13	9	Ret	26	26	Ret	10	26	17	18	22	17	12	11	17	14	13	14	13	338			338
17	(United Kingdom) Tyler Lidsey	Ret	DNS	DNS	22	18	9	15	9	11	9	10	8	6	12	12	8	16	Ret	22	334			334
18	(United Kingdom) Louie Capozzoli	7	7	3	2	1	6	DSQ	18	Ret	13	13	Ret	16							322			322
19	(United Kingdom) James Parker	16	18	14	16	17	21	21	19	Ret	20	14	15	20	17	27	16	27	21	20	303.5	7.5		296
20	(United Kingdom) Clark Wells	18	13	17	19	18	15	Ret	17	Ret	Ret	20	18	25	21	14	12	20	17	14	281			281
21	(United Kingdom) Johnathan Sargeant	19	23	23	20	25	17	11	11	13	Ret	27	24	23	25	Ret	22	19	22	28	276			276
22	(United Kingdom) Mike Paul	14	21	22	10	13	Ret	20	15	Ret	22	28	21	19	14	21	15	21	18	21	299	15	20	264
23	(Republic of Ireland) Mick Fitzgerald	25	26	Ret	25	22	20	23	27	14	19	23	23	22	23	25	26	28	24	26	269.5	7.5		262
24	(Republic of Ireland) Brendan Fitzgerald	21	22	16	24	Ret	19	17	23	18	Ret	17	16	17	20	20	19	23	20	Ret	257			257
25	(United Kingdom) Ben Jenkins	26	17	21	17	23	11	Ret	Ret	20	23	21	20	Ret	24	22	21	24	23	19	252			252
26	(United Kingdom) Barry Holmes	22	24	25	23	24	22	25	24	19	21	26	25	24	Ret	23	23	29	27	Ret	248.5			249
27	(United Kingdom) John McGladrigan	17	19	19	Ret	21	14	26	22			18	19	21	22	16	28	Ret	DNS	DNS	202.5			202.5
28	(Canada) Sophie Wright	23	27	NC	Ret	Ret	DNS	24	28	21	24	29	27	26	28	Ret	Ret	30	29	28	195			195
29	(United Kingdom) Lauren Tayla				Ret	27	23	22	25									Ret	28	27	82.5			83
30	(United Kingdom) Alexander Jay	Ret	DNS	24	15	Ret	Ret	18	13												74			74
Guest drivers ineligible for points
-	(United Kingdom) Alex Keens											30	28	27	26	26	25	14	9	11	-			-
-	(United Kingdom) Max Coates							14	21												-			-
-	(United Kingdom) Piers Henderson														18	19	20				-			-
-	(United Kingdom) Sam Baker									22	Ret	25	22	Ret				22	19	18	-			-
-	(United Kingdom) Andy Cobb														27	24	24	26	26	25	-			-
-	(United Kingdom) Jordan Kerridge																	25	25	24	-			-
-	(United Kingdom) David Stirling	24	25	26																	-			-
-	(United Kingdom) Jack Irvine									Ret	Ret										-			-
