= 2019 Renault UK Clio Cup =

English motor racing championship

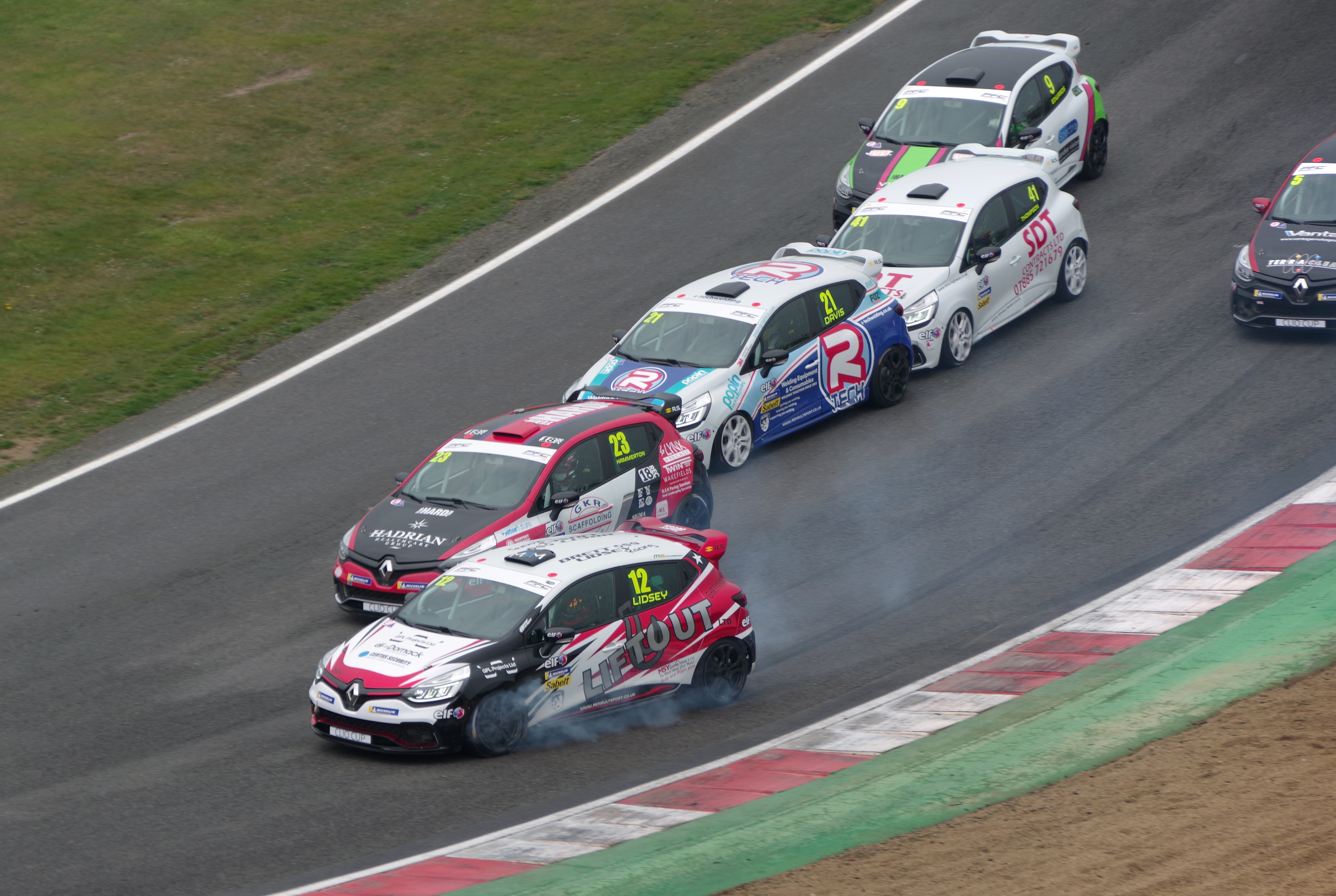
Racing scene at Brands Hatch.

The 2019 Renault UK Clio Cup was a multi-event, one make motor racing championship held across England. The championship features a mix of professional motor racing teams and privately funded drivers competing in the Clio Renaultsport 200 Turbo EDC that conform to the technical regulations for the championship. Organised by the British Automobile Racing Club, it forms part of the extensive program of support categories built up around the British Touring Car Championship. It was the 24th Renault Clio Cup United Kingdom season and the 44th of UK motorsport undertaken by Renault and Renault Sport.

== Teams and drivers ==
The following teams and drivers were signed to run the 2019 season. All teams and drivers were British-registered.

Team	No.	Driver	Rounds
Westbourne Motorsport	2	Nathan Edwards	3
Westbourne Motorsport	3	James Colburn	3
Westbourne Motorsport	157	James Colburn	9
Westbourne Motorsport	5	Ben Colburn	All
Westbourne Motorsport	14	Anton Spires	1, 8–9
Westbourne Motorsport	29	Finlay Robinson	All
Westbourne Motorsport	40	Nick Halstead	8
Westbourne Motorsport	41	Aaron Thompson	1–2, 9
MRM Racing	2	Nathan Edwards	5, 8–9
MRM Racing	9	Jade Edwards	8–9
MRM Racing	10	Tyler Lidsey	6–9
MRM Racing	12	Brett Lidsey	All
MRM Racing	21	Ben Davis	1
MRM Racing	62	Jack Young	All
Team HARD	4	Paul Taylor	8
Team HARD	9	Jade Edwards	1–6
Team HARD	23	Ethan Hammerton	All
Team HARD	56	Jamie Bond	2–9
Team HARD	71	Max Coates	All
Specialised Motorsport	11	Luke Warr	All

== Race Calendar ==
Round	Circuit	Date	Pole position	Fastest lap	Winning driver	Winning team
1	Brands Hatch (Indy Circuit, Kent)	6 April	Max Coates	Max Coates	Max Coates	Team HARD
1	Brands Hatch (Indy Circuit, Kent)	7 April	Max Coates	Max Coates	Max Coates	Team HARD
2	Donington Park (National Circuit, Leicestershire)	28 April	Jack Young	Jamie Bond	Jack Young	MRM Racing
2	Donington Park (National Circuit, Leicestershire)	28 April	Jack Young	Jack Young	Jack Young	MRM Racing
3	Croft Circuit (North Yorkshire)	15 June	Max Coates	Max Coates	Max Coates	Team HARD
3	Croft Circuit (North Yorkshire)	16 June	Max Coates	Jack Young	Max Coates	Team HARD
4	Oulton Park (Island Circuit, Cheshire)	29 June	Jamie Bond	Jack Young	Jack Young	MRM Racing
4	Oulton Park (Island Circuit, Cheshire)	30 June	Jack Young	Ben Colburn	Max Coates	Team HARD
5	Snetterton Circuit (300 Circuit, Norfolk)	4 August	Jack Young	Jamie Bond	Jamie Bond	Team HARD
5	Snetterton Circuit (300 Circuit, Norfolk)	4 August	Jamie Bond	Jamie Bond	Max Coates	Team HARD
6	Thruxton Circuit (Hampshire)	17 August	Brett Lidsey	Jamie Bond	Jack Young	MRM Racing
6	Thruxton Circuit (Hampshire)	18 August	Max Coates	Max Coates	Ethan Hammerton	Team HARD
7	Knockhill Racing Circuit (Fife)	14 September	Max Coates	Jack Young	Max Coates	Team HARD
7	Knockhill Racing Circuit (Fife)	15 September	Jack Young	Jamie Bond	Jack Young	MRM Racing
8	Silverstone Circuit (National Circuit, Northamptonshire)	28 September	Brett Lidsey	Jack Young	Brett Lidsey	MRM Racing
8	Silverstone Circuit (National Circuit, Northamptonshire)	29 September	Brett Lidsey	Ben Colburn	Jack Young	MRM Racing
9	Brands Hatch (Grand Prix Circuit, Kent)	12 October	James Colburn	James Colburn	Brett Lidsey	MRM Racing
9	Brands Hatch (Grand Prix Circuit, Kent)	13 October	James Colburn	Jack Young	Jack Young	MRM Racing

== Championship standings ==
Points system
1st	2nd	3rd	4th	5th	6th	7th	8th	9th	10th	11th	12th	13th	14th	15th	16th+	Ret	Leading a lap	Fastest lap
25	22	20	18	16	13	10	8	7	6	5	4	3	2	1	0	0	1	2

Notes

- One point is awarded to a competitor who leads a Renault UK Clio Cup race. This can only be awarded once to a driver that crosses the start/finish line in the lead.
- Two points are awarded to the Driver(s) setting the fastest lap in each round.
- Drivers shall count their results from the total number of races run less one race.
- Each driver’s single dropped score cannot be taken from the final two rounds of the championship.
- Competitors who are excluded from any race must count that excluded race within their total score.

=== Drivers' championship ===
Pos	Driver	BHI		DON		CRO		OUL		SNE		THR		KNO		SIL		BHGP		Total
1	Jack Young	2	2*	1*	1*	2	4	1*	Ret	5*	2	1	DSQ	2	1*	4	1*	12	1	362
2	Max Coates	1*	1*	Ret	3	1*	1*	3	1*	6*	1	2	Ret*	1*	2	2	11	3	2	357
3	Jamie Bond			4	8	3	3	2*	2	1*	4*	3	2	4	3	3	5	4	7	312
4	Brett Lidsey	3	3	2	2	7	2	7	4	2	3	7*	Ret	3	4	1*	Ret	1*	6	301
5	Ben Colburn	9	Ret	3	4	8	5	4	3	4	6	4	6	Ret	6	5	2	5	Ret	241
6	Ethan Hammerton	4	8	5	7	Ret	10	6	6	3	5	5	1	5	5	7	3	8	Ret	234
7	Jade Edwards	5	4	6	9	6	6	5	5	7	7	6	5			8	Ret	13	8	181
8	Luke Warr	10	9	8	10	9	9	8	Ret	9	9	10	4	6	7	Ret	7	11	10	134
9	Finlay Robinson	7	Ret	7	6	Ret	7	Ret	Ret	8	8	8	Ret	DSQ	8	11	6	Ret	9	77
10	Tyler Lidsey											9	3	7	9	10	8	7	Ret	68
11	James Colburn					5	11											2	3*	67
12	Anton Spires	Ret	6													6	4	10	5	66
13	Nathan Edwards					4	8			Ret	Ret					9	Ret	6	4	64
14	Aaron Thompson	6	7	9	5													9	Ret	54
15	Ben Davis	8	5																	24
16	Paul Taylor															13	9			10
17	Nick Halstead															12	10			10
Pos	Driver	BHI		DON		CRO		OUL		SNE		THR		KNO		SIL		BHGP		Total

=== Graduate Cup ===
Pos	Driver	BHI		DON		CRO		OUL		SNE		THR		KNO		SIL		BHGP		Total
1	Jack Young	2	2	1	1	2	4	1	Ret	5	2	1	DSQ	2	1	4	1	12	1	388
2	Ethan Hammerton	4	8	5	7	Ret	10	6	6	3	5	5	1	5	5	7	3	8	Ret	338
3	Ben Colburn	9	Ret	3	4	8	5	4	3	4	6	4	6	Ret	6	5	2	5	Ret	326
4	Finlay Robinson	7	Ret	7	6	Ret	7	Ret	Ret	8	8	8	Ret	DSQ	8	11	6	Ret	9	166
5	Nathan Edwards					4	8			Ret	Ret					9	Ret	6	4	102
Pos	Driver	BHI		DON		CRO		OUL		SNE		THR		KNO		SIL		BHGP		Total
