= Ethan Hammerton =

British racing driver (born 2000)

- Hammerton driving a Porsche Cayman GT4 at Silverstone Circuit in 2026
- Nationality: (United Kingdom) British
- Born: Ethan Thomas Hammerton; 25 September 2000 (age 26)

Porsche Sprint Challenge Great Britain career
- Debut season: 2023
- Current team: Graves Motorsport
- Years active: 2023, 2025–2026
- Car number: 32
- Starts: 42
- Wins: 0
- Podiums: 10
- Poles: 0
- Fastest laps: 0
- Best finish: 6th in 2025

Previous series
- 2021–2022 2018, 2020 2019 2018 2018 2017: Mini Challenge UK; British Touring Car Championship; Renault UK Clio Cup; VW Racing Cup; Renault Clio Cup Jr. Ford Fiesta Championship

Ethan Thomas Hammerton (born 25 September 2000) is a British racing driver who currently competes in the Porsche Sprint Challenge Great Britain for Graves Motorsport. He has previously has been with Team HARD. in both the British Touring Car Championship in 2018 and the Renault UK Clio Cup in 2019.

== Racing record ==
=== Complete British Touring Car Championship results ===
(key) (Races in bold indicate pole position – 1 point awarded just in first race; races in italics indicate fastest lap – 1 point awarded all races; * signifies that driver led race for at least one lap – 1 point given all races)

Year	Team	Car	1	2	3	4	5	6	7	8	9	10	11	12	13	14	15	16	17	18	19	20	21	22	23	24	25	26	27	28	29	30	DC	Pts
2018	Team HARD. with Trade Price Cars	Volkswagen CC	BRH; 1	BRH; 2	BRH; 3	DON; 1	DON; 2	DON; 3	THR; 1	THR; 2	THR; 3	OUL; 1	OUL; 2	OUL; 3	CRO; 1	CRO; 2	CRO; 3	SNE; 1	SNE; 2	SNE; 3	ROC; 1	ROC; 2	ROC; 3	KNO; 1	KNO; 2	KNO; 3	SIL; 1; 24	SIL; 2; 20	SIL; 3; 24	BRH; 1; 28	BRH; 2 Ret	BRH; 3 Ret	39th	0
2020	GKR TradePriceCars.com	Audi S3 Saloon	DON; 1	DON; 2	DON; 3	BRH; 1	BRH; 2	BRH; 3	OUL; 1	OUL; 2	OUL; 3	KNO; 1	KNO; 2	KNO; 3	THR; 1	THR; 2	THR; 3	SIL; 1	SIL; 2	SIL; 3	CRO; 1	CRO; 2	CRO; 3	SNE; 1; 24	SNE; 2; 19	SNE; 3; 22	BRH; 1; 22	BRH; 2; 24	BRH; 3; 24				32nd	0
