= Max Coates =

British racing driver (born 1994)

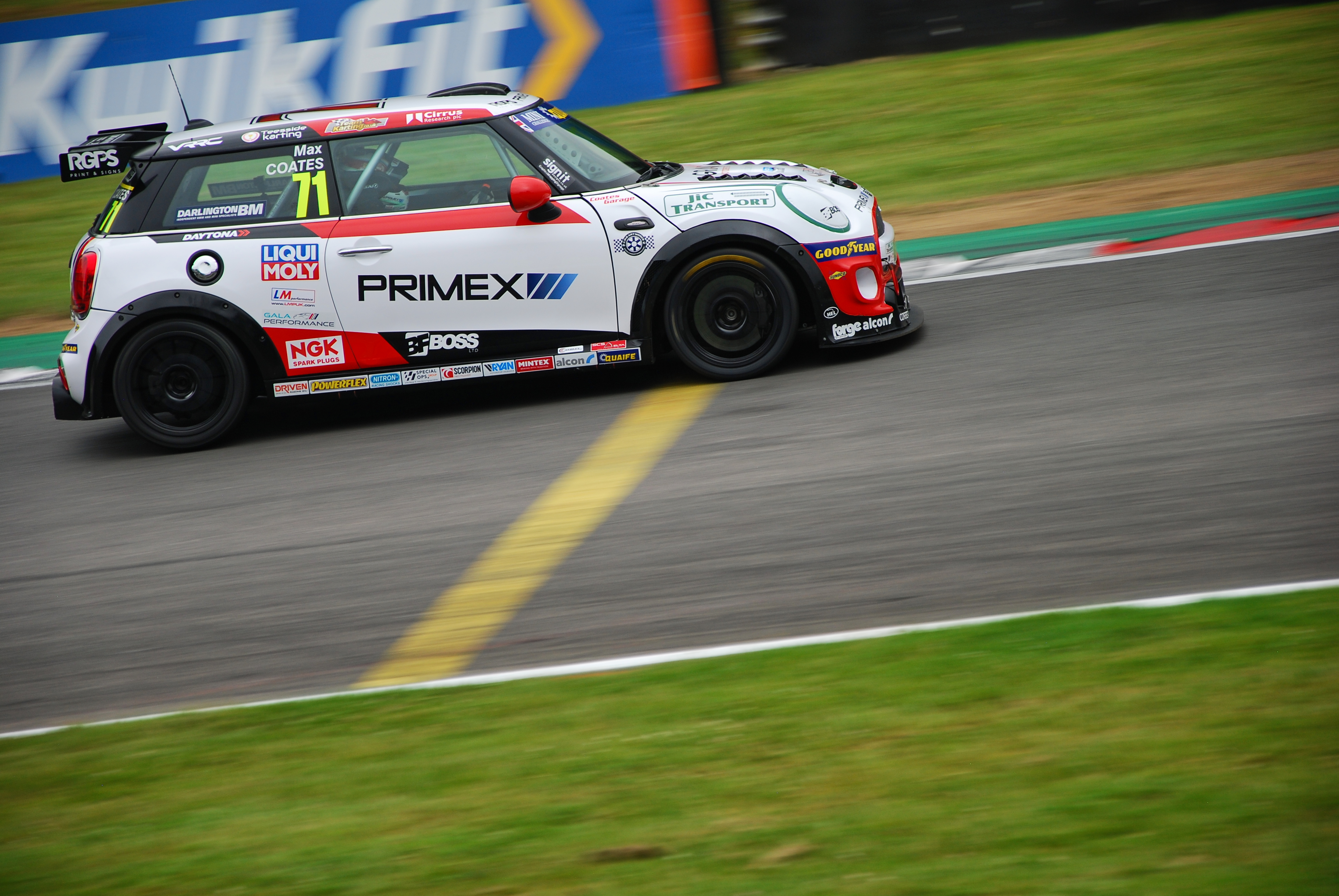
- Coates driving the Mini JCW GP during the 2021 Mini Challenge UK at Brands Hatch
- Nationality: (United Kingdom) British
- Born: 4 January 1994 (age 32) Northallerton, North Yorkshire, England

Clio Cup UK career
- Debut season: 2016
- Current team: Team HARD
- Car number: 71
- Former teams: Ciceley Motorsport
- Starts: 72
- Wins: 14
- Poles: 15
- Fastest laps: 10
- Best finish: 2nd in 2019

Previous series
- 2010-2011 2010-2011 2012-2014 2014 2015 2021: Ginetta Junior Championship; Ginetta Junior Winter Series; Ginetta GT4 Supercup; Porsche Carrera Cup Great Britain; British Touring Car Championship

Max Peter Coates (born 4 January 1994) is a British racing driver who competes in the Porsche Carrera Cup Great Britain for Graves Motorsport.

Coates is a former Clio Cup UK competitor but has since moved factors as the Clio Cup withdrew from being a British Touring Car Championship support race. He spent three years in the Mini Challenge Series, supporting the BTCC, and currently races in the Porsche Sprint Challenge.

== Racing career ==
After several years of karting, Coates made his car racing debut in 2010, racing in the Ginetta Junior Championship. He spent two years in this series before graduating to the Ginetta GT Supercup for 2012, 2013 and 2014, but his racing programmes have often been stymied by a lack of budget, restricting him to part-seasons and guest appearances, such as a one-off outing in the Porsche Carrera Cup Great Britain in 2014.

After four rounds of the 2015 British Touring Car Championship season, Coates was signed by the Support Our Paras team to drive its second entry for the remainder of the season, alongside Derek Palmer Jr. He took the seat that was previously occupied by Richard Hawken and Martin Donnelly. However, due a sponsorship problem, he lost his drive following just one round of the championship.

After a successful season in 2018, Coates once again joined Guy Colclough in the DAT Racing TCR-spec SEAT to race in the 2019 Britcar Endurance Championship season.

== Racing record ==
=== Racing career summary ===
Season	Series	Team	Races	Wins	Poles	F/Laps	Podiums	Points	Position
2010	Ginetta Junior Championship	Privateer	20	0	0	0	0	194	11th
2011	Ginetta Junior Championship	Privateer	20	0	0	0	3	306	6th
2012	Ginetta GT Supercup - G50	Redbrick Racing	20	5	4	1	7	272	6th
2012	Ginetta GT Supercup - G55	Redbrick Racing	3	0	0	0	0	41	15th
2013	Ginetta GT Supercup - G55	Century Motorsport	3	0	0	0	1	66	19th
2014	Porsche Carrera Cup Great Britain	Parr Motorsport	2	0	0	0	0	0	NC†
2014	Ginetta GT4 Supercup	Privateer	3	0	0	0	0	40	20th
2015	British Touring Car Championship	Support Our Paras Racing	3	0	0	0	0	0	34th
2016	Renault Clio Cup UK	Ciceley Motorsport	18	1	2	2	7	361	**3rd**
2017	Renault Clio Cup UK	Ciceley Motorsport	18	2	2	3	6	360	4th
2018	24H TCE Series - A2	Cicley Motorsport	1	0	0	0	1	28	NC
2018	Renault Clio Cup UK	Team Pyro	18	4	5	1	9	309	**3rd**
2018	Britcar Endurance Championship	DAT Racing	4	0	0	1	1	146	9th
2018	Britcar Endurance Championship - Class S4	DAT Racing	4	0	0	1	3	146	5th
2019	Renault Clio Cup UK	Team HARD.	18	7	6	4	14	357	**2nd**
2019	Britcar Endurance Championship	DAT Racing	8	0	0	0	0	180	9th
2019	Britcar Endurance Championship - Class 4	DAT Racing	8	3	5	3	5	180	**3rd**
2019	Touring Car Trophy	DAT Racing	2	2	1	0	2	88	8th
2020	Mini Challenge UK - JCW	Elite Motorsport	13	1	1	0	2	374	6th
2021	Protyre Motorsport Ginetta GT5 Challenge - Pro	Breakell Racing	2	0	1	0	0	33	20th
2022	Mini Challenge UK - JCW	Graves Motorsport	20	1	0	2	2	530	7th
2022	British Endurance Championship - Class E	Dragon Sport by Amigo	4	0	0	1	2	87	6th
2023	Porsche Sprint Challenge Great Britain - Pro	Graves Motorsport	6	0	0	1	2	26	5th*
2023	British Endurance Championship - TCR	Dragon Sport by Amigo	1	0	1	0	1	31	4th*‡
2024	Porsche Sprint Challenge Great Britain	Team Omologato with Graves Motorsport							
2026	Porsche Carrera Cup Great Britain - Pro	Graves Motorsport							

^{*}Season still in progress. ‡ Team standings. † Coates was ineligible for points as he was an invitation entry.

=== Complete Ginetta Junior Championship results ===
(key) (Races in bold indicate pole position – 1 point awarded just in first race; races in italics indicate fastest lap – 1 point awarded all races;-

Year	Team	1	2	3	4	5	6	7	8	9	10	11	12	13	14	15	16	17	18	19	20	DC	Points
2010	Privateer	THR; 1; 18	THR; 2; 17	ROC; 1; 14	ROC; 2; 12	BHGP; 1; 8	BHGP; 2; 8	OUL; 1; 9	OUL; 2; 9	CRO; 1; 11	CRO; 2; 14	SNE; 1; 13	SNE; 2; 16	SIL; 1; 11	SIL; 2; 7	KNO; 1; 15	KNO; 2; 7	DON; 1; 9	DON; 2; 11	BHI; 1; 10	BHI; 2; 6	11th	194
2011	Privateer	BHI; 1; 9	BHI; 2; 4	DON; 1; 6	DON; 2; 4	THR; 1; 3	THR; 2; 3	OUL; 1; 17	OUL; 2; 7	CRO; 1; 5	CRO; 2; 9	SNE; 1; 6	SNE; 2; 11	KNO; 1; 10	KNO; 2; 8	ROC; 1; 4	ROC; 2; 13	BHGP; 1; 3	BHGP; 2; 6	SIL; 1; 9	SIL; 2; 11	6th	309

=== Complete Ginetta GT4 Supercup results ===
(key) (Races in bold indicate pole position – 1 point awarded just in first race; races in italics indicate fastest lap – 1 point awarded all races;-

Year	Team	Class	1	2	3	4	5	6	7	8	9	10	11	12	13	14	15	16	17	18	19	20	21	22	23	24	25	26	27	DC	Points
2012	Redbrick Racing	G50	BRH; 1; 15	BRH; 2; 6	**BRH**; **3** Ret	DON; 1; 9	**DON**; **2**; 6	**DON**; **3**; 8	THR; 1; 12	THR; 2; 7	THR; 3; 6	OUL; 1	OUL; 2	CRO; 1; 10	**CRO**; **2** Ret	CRO; 3 Ret	SNE; 1	SNE; 2	SNE; 3	KNO; 1	KNO; 2	KNO; 3	ROC; 1	ROC; 2	SIL; 1	SIL; 2				6th	272
2012	Redbrick Racing	G55																									BRH; 1; 5	BRH; 2; 9	BRH; 3; 16	15th	41
2013	Century Motorsport	G55	BRH; 1	BRH; 2	BRH; 3	DON; 1	DON; 2	DON; 3	THR; 1	THR; 2	THR; 3	OUL; 1	OUL; 2	CRO; 1; 6	CRO; 2; 4	CRO; 3; 3	SNE; 1	SNE; 2	SNE; 3	KNO; 1	KNO; 2	KNO; 3	ROC; 1	ROC; 2	SIL; 1	SIL; 2	BRH; 1	BRH; 2	BRH; 3	19th	66
2014	Privateer	G55	BRH; 1	BRH; 2	BRH; 3	DON; 1	DON; 2	DON; 3	THR; 1	THR; 2	THR; 3	OUL; 1	OUL; 2	CRO; 1; 13	CRO; 2; 6	CRO; 3; 8	SNE; 1	SNE; 2	SNE; 3	KNO; 1	KNO; 2	KNO; 3	ROC; 1	ROC; 2	SIL; 1	SIL; 2	BRH; 1	BRH; 2	BRH; 3	20th	40

=== Complete British Touring Car Championship results ===
(key) (Races in bold indicate pole position – 1 point awarded just in first race; races in italics indicate fastest lap – 1 point awarded all races; * signifies that driver led race for at least one lap – 1 point given all races)

Year	Team	Car	1	2	3	4	5	6	7	8	9	10	11	12	13	14	15	16	17	18	19	20	21	22	23	24	25	26	27	28	29	30	DC	Pts
2015	Support Our Paras Racing	Infiniti Q50	BRH; 1	BRH; 2	BRH; 3	DON; 1	DON; 2	DON; 3	THR; 1	THR; 2	THR; 3	OUL; 1	OUL; 2	OUL; 3	CRO; 1; 21	CRO; 2; 27	CRO; 3; 20	SNE; 1	SNE; 2	SNE; 3	KNO; 1	KNO; 2	KNO; 3	ROC; 1	ROC; 2	ROC; 3	SIL; 1	SIL; 2	SIL; 3	BRH; 1	BRH; 2	BRH; 3	34th	0

=== Complete Renault Clio Cup UK results ===
(key) (Races in bold indicate pole position – 1 point awarded just in first race; races in italics indicate fastest lap – 1 point awarded all races;- Races with * indicate driver lead a lap in race – 1 point awarded all races (2018-2019);-

Year	Team	1	2	3	4	5	6	7	8	9	10	11	12	13	14	15	16	17	18	DC	Pts
2016	Ciceley Motorsport	BHI; 1; 6	BHI; 2; 8	**DON**; **1**; 4	DON; 2; 5	THR; 1; 9	THR; 2; 10	OUL; 1; 3	OUL; 2; 5	CRO; 1; 2	CRO; 2; 1	SNE; 1; 2	SNE; 2; 5	ROC; 1; 8	ROC; 2; 3	**SIL**; **1**; 5	SIL; 2; 5	BHGP; 1; 6	BHGP; 2; 2	3rd	361
2017	Ciceley Motorsport	BHI; 1; 6	BHI; 2; 6	DON; 1; 1	DON; 2; 3	THR; 1; 8	THR; 2 Ret<	OUL; 1; 6	OUL; 2; 5	CRO; 1; 6	CRO; 2; 2	SNE; 1; 7	SNE; 2; 2	**ROC**; **1**; 1	**ROC**; **2**; 3	SIL; 1; 9	SIL; 2; 4	BHGP; 1; 8	BHGP; 2; 9	4th	360
2018	Team Pyro	**BHI**; **1**; 5*	BHI; 2; 1*	DON; 1; 6	DON; 2; 6	**THR**; **1**; 2*	THR; 2; 3	OUL; 1; 3	OUL; 2; 1*	**CRO**; **1**; 2	**CRO**; **2**; 1*	SNE; 1; 11	**SNE**; **2**; 1*	ROC; 1 Ret	ROC; 2; 3	SIL; 1 Ret	SIL; 2; 5	BHGP; 1; 5	BHGP; 2; 4	3rd	309
2019	Team HARD	**BHI**; **1**; 1*	**BHI**; **2**; 1*	DON; 1 Ret	DON; 2; 3	**CRO**; **1**; 1*	**CRO**; **2**; 1*	OUL; 1; 3	OUL; 2; 1*	SNE; 1; 6*	SNE; 2; 1	THR; 1; 2	**THR**; **2** Ret*	**KNO**; **1**; 1*	KNO; 2; 2	SIL; 1; 2	SIL; 2; 11	BRH; 1; 3	BRH; 2; 2	2nd	357

=== Complete Britcar results ===
(key) (Races in bold indicate pole position in class – 1 point awarded just in first race; races in italics indicate fastest lap in class – 1 point awarded all races;-

Year	Team	Car	Class	1	2	3	4	5	6	7	8	9	10	11	12	13	14	15	16	DC	CP	Points
2018	DAT Racing	SEAT León TCR	S4	ROC; 1	ROC; 2	SIL; 1	SIL; 2	OUL; 1	OUL; 2	DON; 1	DON; 2	SNE; 1 Ret	SNE; 2; 3	SIL; 1; 9	SIL; 2; 9	BRH; 1	BRH; 2			9th	5th	146
2019	DAT Racing	SEAT León TCR	4	SIL; 1; 18	SIL; 2; 15	SIL; 1	SIL; 2	BRH; 1	BRH; 2	**DON**; **1**; 9	DON; 2; 9	**OUL**; **1**; 7	OUL; 2; 15	SNE; 1	SNE; 2	**OUL**; **1**; 5	OUL; 2; 11	BRH; 1	BRH; 2	9th	3rd	180

=== Complete TCR UK/Touring Car Trophy results ===
(key) (Races in bold indicate pole position – 1 point awarded just in first race; races in italics indicate fastest lap – 1 point awarded all races; * signifies that driver led race for at least one lap – 1 point given all races)

Year	Team	Car	1	2	3	4	5	6	7	8	9	10	DC	TU	Pts	TCR Pts
2019	DAT Racing	SEAT Leon TCR	OUL; 1	OUL; 2	DON; 1; 1	**DON**; **2**; 1	CRO; 1	CRO; 2	BHI; 1	BHI; 2	DON; 1	DON; 2	8th		88	

=== Complete British Endurance Championship results ===
(key) (Races in bold indicate pole position in class – 1 point awarded just in first race; races in italics indicate fastest lap in class – 1 point awarded all races;-

Year	Team	Car	Class	1	2	3	4	5	6	DC	CP	Points
2022	Dragon Sport by Amigo	Vauxhall Astra TCR	E	SIL1; 8	OUL; 16	SNE	SIL2; 12	DON1; Ret	DON2	22nd	6th	87
2023	Dragon Sport by Amigo	Vauxhall Astra TCR	TCR	**SIL1**; 16	BRH	OUL	SIL2	SNE	DON	18th*‡	4th*‡	31*‡

^{*}Season still in progress. ‡ Team standings.
