= Team Parker Racing =

British motor racing team

(United Kingdom) Team Parker Racing
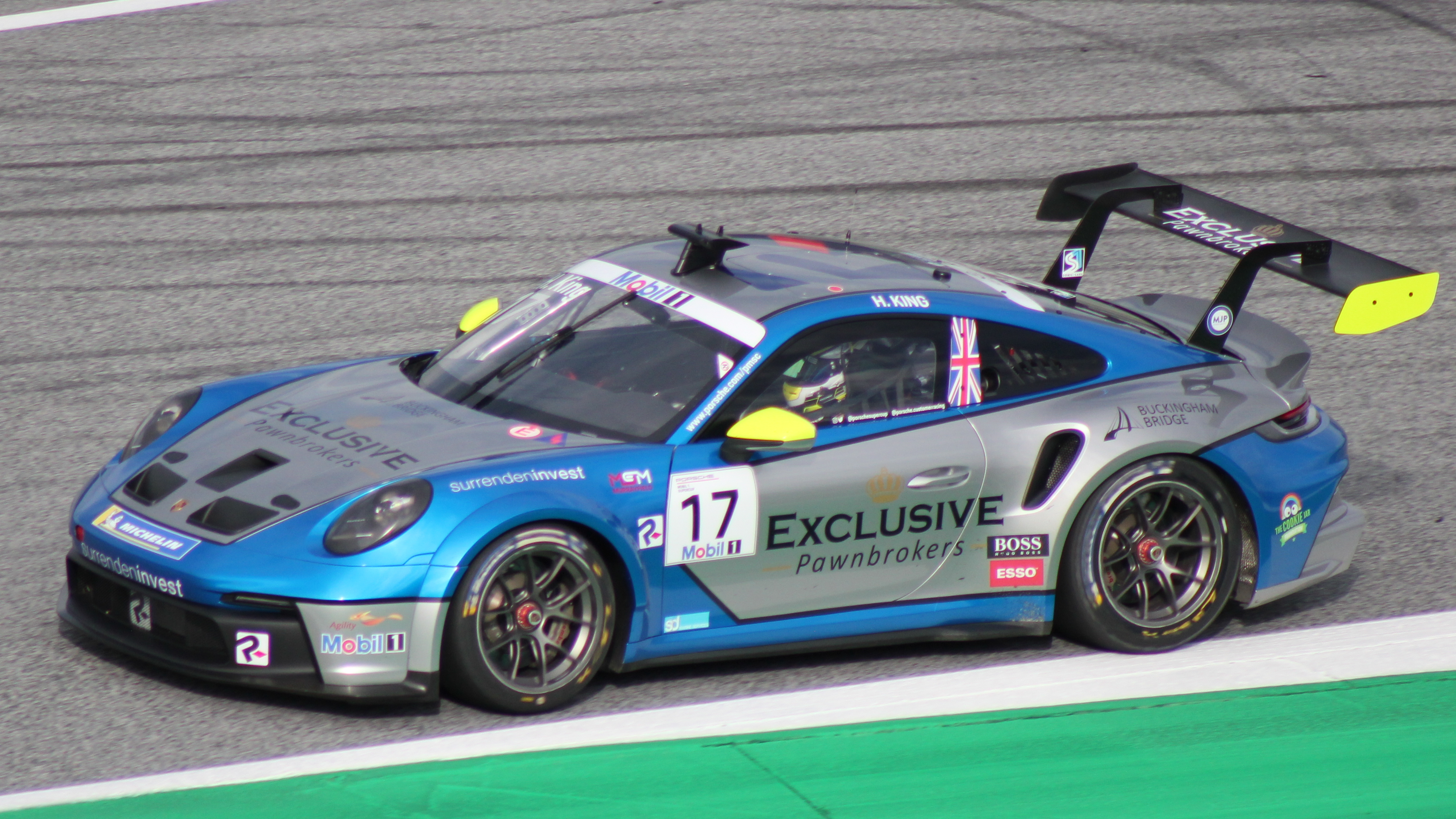
- Founded: 1997
- Team principal(s): Stuart Parker, Andy Parker
- Current series: British GT; Porsche Supercup; Porsche Carrera Cup GB; Porsche Sprint Challenge GB
- Former series: Formula Vauxhall; 24 Hours Nürburgring; Blancpain Endurance; BTCC; British Formula 3 Championship
- Teams' Championships: 2005 Carrera Cup GB; 2006 Carrera Cup GB
- Drivers' Championships: 2005 Carrera Cup GB (Faulkner); 2006 Carrera Cup GB (Faulkner); 2009 Carrera Cup GB (Bridgman)

Team Parker Racing is a motorsport team based in Leicestershire, in the United Kingdom. Founded in 1997 it has previously competed in Formula Vauxhall Junior, British Formula 3, GT World Challenge Europe, and, more recently, in the British Touring Car Championship, where it is a race-winner, alongside long-term relationships with the Porsche Carrera Cup GB and Caterham.

For 2021 the team will race in the British GT Championship, Porsche Supercup, Porsche Carrera Cup GB, Porsche Sprint Challenge GB, and select Caterham events.

The team partnered with Racing Pride in 2019 to support greater inclusivity across the British motorsport industry for LGBT+ fans, employees and drivers.
