= Jake Cook =

British racing driver (1993–2023)

- Born: 20 June 1993 Rotherham, Yorkshire, England
- Died: 14 November 2023 (aged 30) Rotherham, Yorkshire, England
- Relatives: Paula Cook; Derek Cook; David Cook

Protyre Formula Renault Championship career
- Debut season: 2013
- Current team: Hillspeed
- Car number: 25
- Engine: Renault
- Starts: 16
- Championships: 0
- Wins: 0
- Poles: 0
- Fastest laps: 1

Previous series
- 2013 2011–2012 2010 2010–2012 2009 2008: BRDC F4 Winter; Formula Ford EuroCup; Formula Ford Festival; British Formula Ford; Ginetta Junior Championship; Ginetta Junior Winter Championship

Awards
- 2013 2010: BRDC Rising Star; MSA Young Driver of the Year

Jake Cook (20 June 1993 – 14 November 2023) was a British racing driver. He last competed in the BRDC Formula 4 Winter Championship for Hillspeed. He was the nephew of former British Touring Car Championship driver Paula Cook. He won the MSA Young Driver of the Year award for 2010, the first recipient of the award.

Cook died of suicide in November 2023, after struggling with mental health.

== Racing career ==
=== 2008–2009 ===
Born in Rotherham, Cook made his racing debut in 2008 in the Ginetta Junior Winter Championship, taking one podium in three races. For 2009, he entered the full Ginetta Junior Championship season, driving for TJ Motorsport, and won his first race in the series, having qualified on pole, at the Brands Hatch track. He won the second race at Brands Hatch, and later followed up these results by winning both races at Snetterton Circuit, and repeating the feat at Knockhill Circuit. However, these results were marred by a 20-point penalty for violating driving standards at Oulton Park. With six races left, Cook was leading the championship from Aaron Williamson and Sarah Moore, and a victory from the second race at Silverstone Circuit extended his lead. At the end of the season, however, Cook finished second overall, with Moore becoming the series' first female champion (having already become the series' first female race winner) by 16 points. In August of that year, Cook had joined the Motor Sport AASE programme, part of the MSA's Academy structure.

=== 2010–2011 ===
In 2010, Cook joined the British Formula Ford Championship, signing for Getem Racing, whom were entering a Mygale SJ07. His first podium came at the Zandvoort Circuit, before his season came to a premature close due to funding issues, resulting in Cook finishing ninth overall. Cook did, however, enter that year's Formula Ford Festival (held at the Brands Hatch circuit), and got through to the semi-final, where he retired on the first lap. Following this season, he was the first driver to be awarded the MSA's Young Driver of the Year award.

Cook returned to the series in 2011 with Jamun Racing, signing a one-round deal for the season opener at Silverstone, with his best result a seventh place in the second race of the weekend. Following this event, however he remained with the team until the Zandvoort round, and finished the season in 12th place. He also competed in two of the four Formula Ford EuroCup events, with a best result of eighth from race one of the second round at Zandvoort.

=== 2012–2013 ===
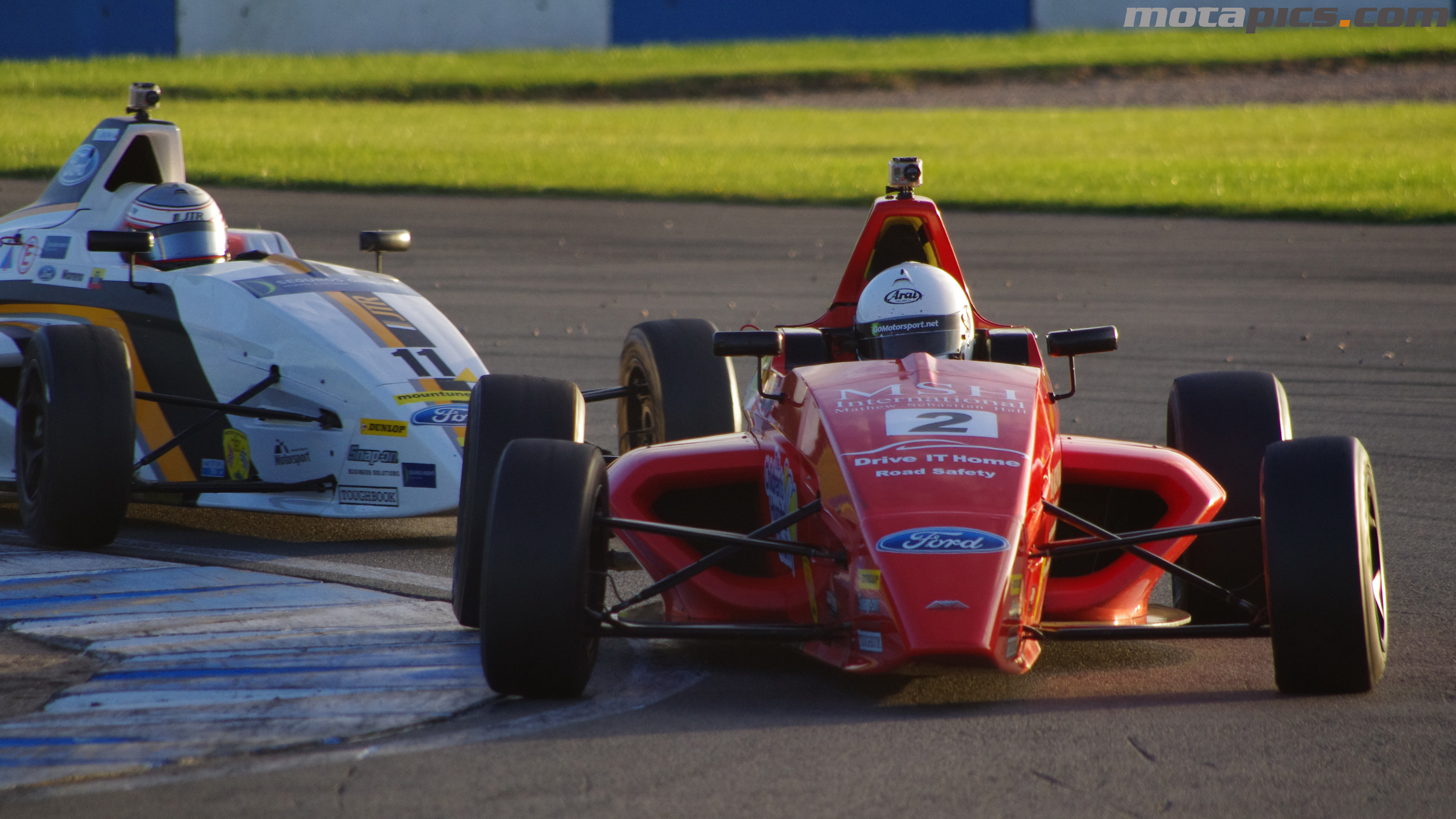
Cook racing at Donington Park in 2012.

For 2012, Cook remained in the British Formula Ford with Jamun Racing, with the series using the new Ford Ecoboost engine for the first time. This proved to be Cook's most successful season in the series, with his first win coming in the second round of the season opener at Brands Hatch. His second win came at the second race of the season finale at Donington Park, where he secured a second-place finish the championship. In addition to the two victories, Cook finished on the podium 12 more times, with three fastest laps. During the season, Cook also competed in the Zandvoort round of the Formula Ford EuroCup, with a single victory coming at the third race.

In 2013, Cook made the switch to the Protyre Formula Renault Championship series, driving for Hillspeed Racing, a series which his aunt's brother, David, had won in 1996. His debut in the series came at Donington Park, where he finished 12th in race one, and 4th in race two. A hat-trick of podiums followed at the second round, held at Snetterton Circuit, resulting in Cook leaving the track in second place overall in the championship standings. He took two more podiums at Thruxton, and, apart from two retirements, did not finish below sixth after that weekend. At Silverstone, in the first race of the day, he took second, and his first fastest lap in the season; as a result, he finished the season in fifth place, with 292 points. His performances in the series saw him named as a BRDC Rising Star in August. Following the end of the Formula Renault season, Cook was selected to drive for Hillspeed in the BRDC Formula 4 Winter Championship. On the third race of his debut weekend, held at Snetterton, he started from pole, and won the race. He followed this with another win in the following race, and two podiums at Brands Hatch, on his way to securing second in the championship. At the end of the season, he was named in The Checkered Flag's Top 10 UK Single-Seater drivers list.

== Personal life ==
Jake Cook was the nephew of former British Touring Car Championship driver Paula Cook, and was also related to former British Formula Renault champion David Cook and former Shellsport International Series driver Derek Cook. He stated in 2013 that his ambition was to become a Formula 1 driver, with his hero having been Ayrton Senna, and that he was a Sheffield Wednesday fan. He studied Economics at Newcastle University.

Cook died by suicide at the age of 30 in November 2023, having struggled with mental health issues. He was a father of two.
