= Chris Swanwick =

British racing driver (born 1993)

- Swanwick in 2011
- Nationality: (United Kingdom) British
- Born: 22 October 1993 (age 33) Nottingham, England

Previous series
- 2012 2011 2011 2009–10: Renault Clio Cup Italia; BTCC; Renault Clio Cup UK; Ginetta Junior Championship

Awards
- 2010: Hard Charger Trophy

Christopher James Swanwick (born 22 October 1993) is a British racing driver who last competed in the Renault UK Clio Cup.

== Career history ==
=== Karting ===
Swanwick was a relative late starter to karting, starting in 2003 at the age of nine in Formula cadets where he did his novice plates. He quickly progressed and by the end of the next year won the Comer cadets, North Regional Final. Not being happy to stay in cadets for another year, Swanwick decided to move up to Mini Max for the 2005 season, and by the end of the year was a regular on the podium at Wombwell. He could have stopped in mini Max for another couple of years, but having the need for speed, Swanwick decided he wanted to drive JICAs. In the middle of 2006, he had a time at Strawberry Racing, but damaged his rib badly and did not race again until the second half of the year.

=== Ginetta Junior Championship ===
Swanwick tested and signed for Tollbar Racing in January 2009. He passed is ARDS test in February to gain his racing licence. Swanwick competed in the Ginetta Junior Championship for Tollbar Racing where he finished with eight podiums and completed the season in seventh.

Swanwick competed for half a year in the Ginetta Junior Championship for Team Parker Racing where he finished with two podiums (Thruxton Round 1 and Snetterton Round 12). He finished the season in 14th. Swanwicks aggressive driving style saw him disqualified in Round 14 of the championship at Silverstone after an incident that resulted in three cars retiring from the race. Team Pyro saw potential in Swanwick and signed him up for the Renault Clio Cup 2011.

=== Renault Clio Cup United Kingdom ===
Swanwick competed in Renault Clio Cup 2011 for Team Pyro. Swanwick found the front wheel drive Clio more of a challenge than the rear wheel Ginetta G20. Despite this, Swanwick's aggressive driving style saw him take seventh and eighth place twice over the season. Rob Austin again saw Swanwick's potential and signed him up as the team's junior driver after testing at Pembrey in July 2011.

=== British Touring Car Championship ===
==== Rob Austin Racing (2011) ====
Swanwick test driving for Rob Austin Racing at Rockingham, July 2011 in preparation for his debut in the 2011 British Touring Car Championship.

Swanwick tested the second NGTC Spec Audi A4 for Rob Austin Racing and made his BTCC début on 2 October 2011 at Brands Hatch, and raced at Silverstone, the championship's finale. He finished five of the six races he competed in and at the end of the season was classified 32nd in the drivers' championship.

== Personal life ==
Swanwick, was born in Nottingham, England and attended Dagfa House School. Swanwick lives in Moorgreen near Eastwood, Nottinghamshire. He attended Dagfa House School between ages of 11 and 16, Dagfa school allows flexible school hours which suited Swanwicks race schedule. Swanwick currently works as a diamond driller for his father's company East Midlands Diamond Drilling (EMDD). EMDD is also one of his main sponsors.

Swanwick is 6' 3" ft. tall and has gained the nickname Sonic Swanwick due to his spiky hair.

== Racing record ==
=== Complete British Touring Car Championship results ===
(key) (Races in bold indicate pole position – 1 point awarded in first race) (Races in italics indicate fastest lap – 1 point awarded all races) (* signifies that driver lead race for at least one lap – 1 point awarded all races)

Year	Team	Car	1	2	3	4	5	6	7	8	9	10	11	12	13	14	15	16	17	18	19	20	21	22	23	24	25	26	27	28	29	30	DC	Pts
2011	Rob Austin Racing	Audi A4	BRH; 1	BRH; 2	BRH; 3	DON; 1	DON; 2	DON; 3	THR; 1	THR; 2	THR; 3	OUL; 1	OUL; 2	OUL; 3	CRO; 1	CRO; 2	CRO; 3	SNE; 1	SNE; 2	SNE; 3	KNO; 1	KNO; 2	KNO; 3	ROC; 1	ROC; 2	ROC; 3	BRH; 1; 17	BRH; 2; 27	BRH; 3; 19	SIL; 1; 22	SIL; 2; 18	SIL; 3 Ret	32nd	0
