= 2009 Ginetta Junior Championship =

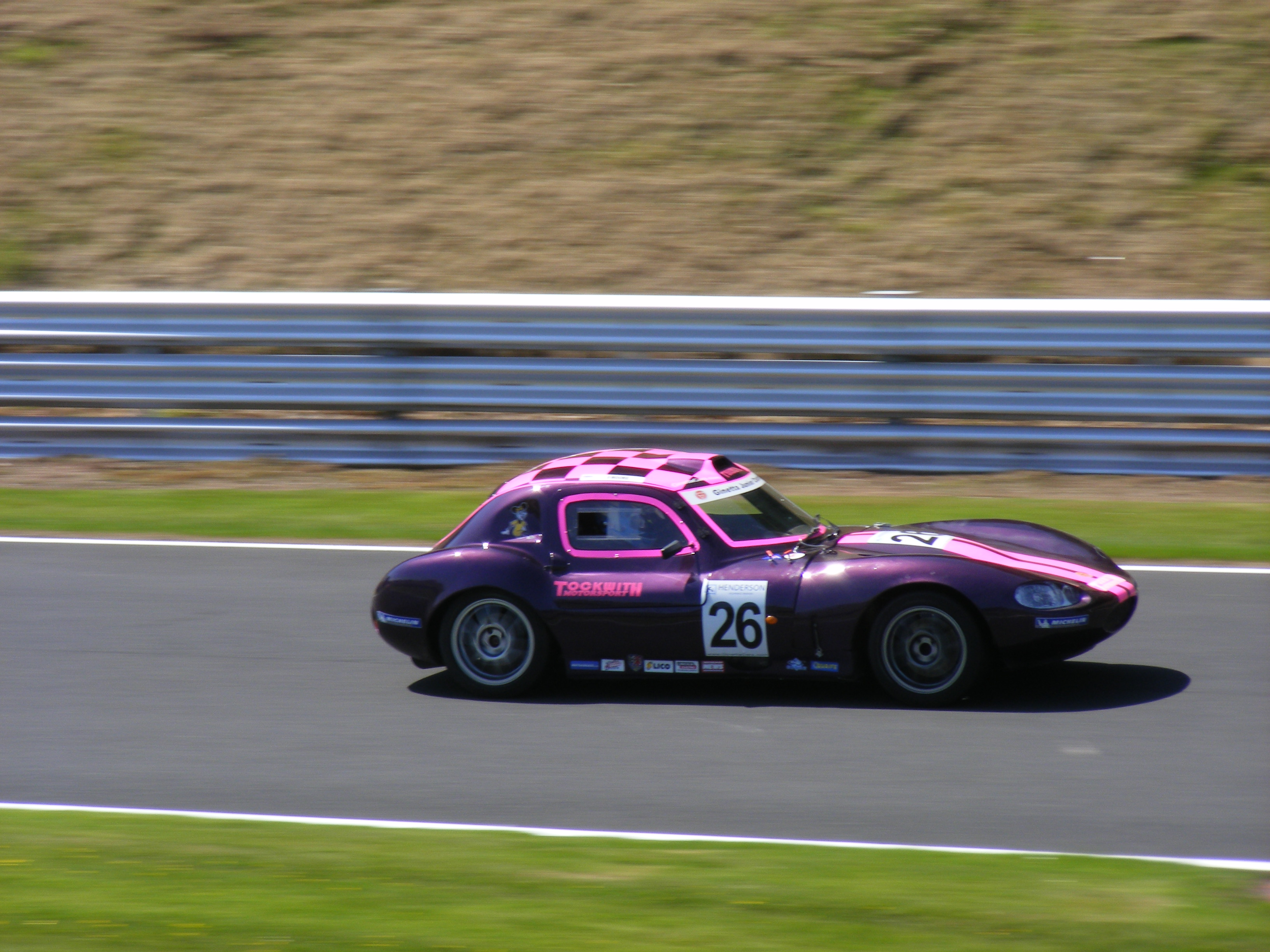
2009 champion Sarah Moore

The 2009 Ginetta Junior Championship was the fifth season of the Ginetta Junior Championship. The season began at Brands Hatch on 4 April 2009 and concluded after 20 races over 10 events also at Brands Hatch on 4 October 2009. This was the last season that the drivers raced Ginetta G20 cars. They were replaced with the G40 in 2010.

== Teams and drivers ==
- All drivers raced in Ginetta G20s.

Team	No.	Drivers	Rounds
Tollbar Racing with Food Connections	2	(United Kingdom) Jake Hill	1–5, 10
Tollbar Racing with Food Connections	3	(United Kingdom) Chris Swanwick	All
Tollbar Racing with Food Connections	4	(United Kingdom) Mitchell Hale	All
Tockwith Motorsport	5	(United Kingdom) Carl Stirling	All
Tockwith Motorsport	24	(United Kingdom) David Moore	All
Tockwith Motorsport	26	(United Kingdom) Sarah Moore	All
Tockwith Motorsport	43	(United Kingdom) Sam Jenkins	2
Tockwith Motorsport	51	(United Kingdom) Alex Austin	All
Tockwith Motorsport	80	(United Kingdom) Tom Ingram	1–5, 8, 10
Tockwith Motorsport	86	(United Kingdom) Pippa Coleman	1–4, 8–10
Tockwith Motorsport	89	(United Kingdom) Shane Stoney	2–9
Privateer	7	(United Kingdom) Jake Giddings	1
FML	7	(United Kingdom) Jake Giddings	2–10
Advent Motorsport	8	(United Kingdom) James Owen	3–4
Solutions Racing	10	(Belgium) Anthony Sauvan	2–5
Allied Office Furniture	13	(United Kingdom) Max Morgan	1, 4, 6, 8, 10
TJ Motorsport	20	(United Kingdom) Tom Howard	All
TJ Motorsport	25	(United Kingdom) Louise Richardson	All
TJ Motorsport	60	(United Kingdom) Jake Cook	All
Muzz Racing	27	(United Kingdom) Aaron Williamson	All
Muzz Racing	29	(United Kingdom) Ashley Craig	1–4, 9–10
Muzz Racing	33	(United Kingdom) Jake Rattenbury	All
Welch Motorsport	44	(United Kingdom) Adam Bonham	All
TBC	72	(United Kingdom) Max McGuire	1–5
Privateer	75	(United Kingdom) Oliver Llewellyn	1–2

== Race calendar and results ==
All rounds were held in the United Kingdom.

Round		Circuit	Date	Pole position	Fastest lap	Winning driver	Winning team
1	R1	Brands Hatch Indy, Kent	4 April	(United Kingdom) Jake Cook	(United Kingdom) Jake Hill	(United Kingdom) Jake Cook	TJ Motorsport
1	R2	Brands Hatch Indy, Kent	5 April	(United Kingdom) Jake Cook	(United Kingdom) Jake Hill	(United Kingdom) Jake Cook	TJ Motorsport
2	R3	Thruxton Circuit, Hampshire	25 April	(United Kingdom) Jake Hill	(United Kingdom) Jake Hill	(United Kingdom) Sarah Moore	Tockwith Motorsport
2	R4	Thruxton Circuit, Hampshire	26 April	(United Kingdom) Alex Austin	(United Kingdom) Aaron Williamson	(United Kingdom) Sarah Moore	Tockwith Motorsport
3	R5	Donington Park, Leicestershire	17 May	(United Kingdom) Jake Hill	(United Kingdom) Sarah Moore	(United Kingdom) Sarah Moore	Tockwith Motorsport
3	R6	Donington Park, Leicestershire	17 May	(United Kingdom) Jake Hill	(United Kingdom) Jake Hill	(United Kingdom) Aaron Williamson	Muzz Racing
4	R7	Oulton Park, Cheshire	30 May	(United Kingdom) Tom Ingram	(United Kingdom) Sarah Moore	(United Kingdom) Alex Austin	Tockwith Motorsport
4	R8	Oulton Park, Cheshire	31 May	(United Kingdom) Tom Ingram	(United Kingdom) Mitchell Hale	(United Kingdom) Aaron Williamson	Muzz Racing
5	R9	Croft Circuit, North Yorkshire	13 June	(United Kingdom) Chris Swanwick	(United Kingdom) Chris Swanwick	(United Kingdom) Aaron Williamson	Muzz Racing
5	R10	Croft Circuit, North Yorkshire	14 June	(United Kingdom) Chris Swanwick	(United Kingdom) Jake Cook	(United Kingdom) Jake Hill	Tollbar Racing
6	R11	Snetterton Motor Racing Circuit, Norfolk	2 August	(United Kingdom) Jake Cook	(United Kingdom) Jake Cook	(United Kingdom) Jake Cook	TJ Motorsport
6	R12	Snetterton Motor Racing Circuit, Norfolk	2 August	(United Kingdom) Jake Cook	(United Kingdom) Jake Cook	(United Kingdom) Jake Cook	TJ Motorsport
7	R13	Knockhill Racing Circuit, Fife	16 August	(United Kingdom) Jake Cook	(United Kingdom) Jake Cook	(United Kingdom) Jake Cook	TJ Motorsport
7	R14	Knockhill Racing Circuit, Fife	16 August	(United Kingdom) Jake Cook	(United Kingdom) Aaron Williamson	(United Kingdom) Jake Cook	TJ Motorsport
8	R15	Silverstone Circuit, Northamptonshire	29 August	(United Kingdom) Chris Swanwick	(United Kingdom) Jake Cook	(United Kingdom) Jake Cook	TJ Motorsport
8	R16	Silverstone Circuit, Northamptonshire	30 August	(United Kingdom) Chris Swanwick	(United Kingdom) Alex Austin	(United Kingdom) Sarah Moore	Tockwith Motorsport
9	R17	Rockingham Motor Speedway, Northamptonshire	19 September	(United Kingdom) Jake Cook	(United Kingdom) Sarah Moore	(United Kingdom) Jake Cook	TJ Motorsport
9	R18	Rockingham Motor Speedway, Northamptonshire	20 September	(United Kingdom) Jake Cook	(United Kingdom) Sarah Moore	(United Kingdom) Sarah Moore	Tockwith Motorsport
10	R19	Brands Hatch GP, Kent	3 October	(United Kingdom) Jake Hill	(United Kingdom) Aaron Williamson	(United Kingdom) Jake Hill	Tollbar Racing
10	R20	Brands Hatch GP, Kent	4 October	(United Kingdom) Jake Hill	(United Kingdom) Jake Hill	(United Kingdom) Jake Hill	Tollbar Racing

== Drivers' Championship ==
(key)

Pos	Driver	BHI		THR		DON		OUL		CRO		SNE		KNO		SIL		ROC		BHGP		Pts
1	(United Kingdom) Sarah Moore	9	4	1	1	1	3	3	3	6	17	4	5	Ret	2	4	1	4	1	12	2	458
2	(United Kingdom) Jake Cook	1	1	11	5	5	4	DSQ	Ret	2	5	1	1	1	1	1	Ret	1	Ret	3	10	432
3	(United Kingdom) Aaron Williamson	2	13	7	Ret	3	1	6	1	1	7	3	3	2	3	Ret	3	10	5	2	Ret	406
4	(United Kingdom) Alex Austin	4	2	2	2	4	5	1	8	11	3	11	Ret	9	7	3	2	13	Ret	5	6	371
5	(United Kingdom) Mitchell Hale	3	10	15	10	10	12	4	4	8	4	8	8	5	6	6	14	9	2	6	4	328
6	(United Kingdom) Tom Howard	5	3	8	9	9	14	5	9	5	14	6	4	7	10	Ret	5	3	3	7	3	321
7	(United Kingdom) Chris Swanwick	Ret	15	Ret	15	2	15	15	12	3	2	2	2	3	4	2	Ret	2	4	14	8	320
8	(United Kingdom) David Moore	15	Ret	6	4	7	10	2	6	10	6	10	6	11	8	14	8	5	Ret	8	Ret	258
9	(United Kingdom) Louise Richardson	8	Ret	Ret	7	12	8	9	Ret	14	11	5	10	4	5	13	10	7	Ret	4	5	232
10	(United Kingdom) Jake Rattenbury	10	12	13	13	Ret	6	11	10	12	9	9	11	8	9	5	4	8	7	11	9	228
11	(United Kingdom) Jake Hill	Ret	7	3	Ret	14	2	10	Ret	17	1									1	1	209
12	(United Kingdom) Tom Ingram	11	8	4	3	6	11	Ret	7	4	Ret					8	6			13	7	196
13	(United Kingdom) Carl Stirling	14	9	5	16	Ret	16	Ret	2	9	8	12	9	6	11	7	11	Ret	Ret	10	Ret	191
14	(United Kingdom) Adam Bonham	16	17	18	19	16	19	13	13	16	12	Ret	13	12	12	11	13	12	8	17	Ret	122
15	(United Kingdom) Pippa Coleman	12	14	19	6	13	18	Ret	DNS							10	9	6	9	9	12	121
16	(United Kingdom) Max McGuire	6	6	12	17	8	7	Ret	5	7	16											120
17	(United Kingdom) Shane Stoney			16	14	15	17	8	11	13	10	7	7	10	Ret	9	7	Ret	DNS			111
18	(United Kingdom) Jake Giddings	17	16	17	18	Ret	21	12	Ret	18	15	13	12	13	13	12	12	11	Ret	16	Ret	100
19	(United Kingdom) Ashley Craig	7	5	9	8	17	9	Ret	Ret									Ret	6	15	11	97
20	(Belgium) Anthony Sauvan			14	11	11	13	7	Ret	15	13											65
21	(United Kingdom) Max Morgan	18	18					16	14			14	14			15	15			18	13	49
22	(United Kingdom) Oliver Llewellyn	13	11	10	12																	38
23	(United Kingdom) James Owen					18	20	14	Ret													11
24	(United Kingdom) Sam Jenkins			20	20																	2
Pos	Driver	BHI		THR		DON		OUL		CRO		SNE		KNO		SIL		ROC		BHGP		Pts
