= 2011 Ginetta GT Supercup =

The 2011 Michelin Ginetta GT Supercup season will be the inaugural Ginetta GT Supercup season, having rebranded from the Ginetta G50 Cup, which ran between 2008 and 2010. The season will begin at Brands Hatch on 4 April and will finish after 27 races over 10 rounds at Sliverstone on 16 October, supporting all rounds of the British Touring Car Championship.

The season sees a new direction for the series with a move towards a GT style class structure with two cars eligible to race in the championship. The older Ginetta G50 is still eligible to race along with the introduction of the new Ginetta G55 with 370 bhp (280 kW), 70 more than the G50.

The winner of the G55 Championship will win a fully paid drive in a Next Generation Touring Car in the 2012 British Touring Car Championship.

== Teams and drivers ==
Team	No.	Drivers	Rounds
G55
Total Control Racing	3	(United Kingdom) Carl Breeze	All
Total Control Racing	9	(United Kingdom) Tim Harvey	5
Total Control Racing	20	(United Kingdom) Marino Franchitti	7
Total Control Racing	29	(United Kingdom) Jamie Orton	10
Total Control Racing	30	(United Kingdom) Patrick Watts	9
Total Control Racing	75	(Switzerland) Joachim Ritter	1–4
Century Motorsport	4	(United Kingdom) Clint Bardwell	1
Century Motorsport	32	(United Kingdom) Freddie Hetherington	2, 4, 8, 10
Century Motorsport	69	(United Kingdom) Mark Steward	1, 3
Century Motorsport	73	(United Kingdom) Nathan Freke	All
Century Motorsport	84	(United Kingdom) Phil Broad	6, 9
Century Motorsport	91	(United Kingdom) Fergus Walkinshaw	9–10
Privateer	91	(United Kingdom) Fergus Walkinshaw	6
FML	91	(United Kingdom) Fergus Walkinshaw	7–8
JHR Developments	6	(United Kingdom) Stefan Hodgetts	4–5
JHR Developments	14	(United Kingdom) Lee Pattison	6–7
JHR Developments	60	(United Kingdom) David McDonald	10
Plans Motorsport	8	(United Kingdom) Alistair James	1–6, 10
IDL	10	(United Kingdom) Tom Sharp	All
Ciceley Racing	33	(United Kingdom) Adam Morgan	All
Brookland Speed Racing	44	(Australia) Jordan Skinner	1–2
Optimum Motorsport/Poor Boys	71	(United Kingdom) George Murrells	1–6, 8, 10
CWS Racing	78	(United Kingdom) Colin White	All
G50
Richardson Racing	2	(United Kingdom) Louise Richardson	1–3, 6, 8–10
Richardson Racing	5	(United Kingdom) Andrew Richardson	1–3, 5–6, 8–10
Century Motorsport	72	(United Kingdom) Trevor Keats	10
JHR Developments	14	(United Kingdom) Lee Pattison	4–5, 8
JHR Developments	40	(United Kingdom) Josh Fielding	7
JHR Developments	81	(United Kingdom) Jake Rattenbury	10
CWS Racing	7	(United Kingdom) Martin Thomas	1
Beacon Racing	11	(Republic of Ireland) Connaire Finn	1–2, 4, 6–7
Beacon Racing	46	(United Kingdom) Robert Gaffney	10
Beacon Racing	55	(United Kingdom) Michael Doyle	6–8
Beacon Racing	56	(United Kingdom) Gary Duckman	9
Kelvin Jones Motorsport	22	(United Kingdom) Paul McClughan	1
Team Pyro	27	(United Kingdom) Jody Fannin	All
FML	31	(United Kingdom) Aaron Williamson	All
Meridian Motorsport	46	(United Kingdom) Robert Gaffney	1–3, 9
Redbrick Racing	54	(United Kingdom) Mark Johnston	9–10
Optimum Motorsport/Poor Boys	77	(United Kingdom) Mark Davies	10
Optimum Motorsport/Poor Boys	94	(United Kingdom) Jake Hill	1–5
Tollbar Racing	94	(United Kingdom) Jake Hill	6–10
Plans Motorsport	80	(United Kingdom) Tom Ingram	1–9

== Race calendar and results ==
All races were held in the United Kingdom. The series lasted for 27 races over 10 rounds and supported the British Touring Car Championship at all rounds.

Round		Circuit	Date	Pole position	Fastest lap	Winning driver	Winning team
1	R1	Brands Hatch (Indy), Kent	2 April	(United Kingdom) Tom Sharp	(United Kingdom) Carl Breeze	(United Kingdom) Tom Sharp	IDL
1	R2	Brands Hatch (Indy), Kent	2 April		(United Kingdom) Tom Sharp	(United Kingdom) Tom Sharp	IDL
1	R3	Brands Hatch (Indy), Kent	3 April		(United Kingdom) Tom Sharp	(United Kingdom) Tom Sharp	IDL
2	R4	Donington Park, Leicestershire	16 April	(United Kingdom) Tom Sharp	(United Kingdom) Carl Breeze	(United Kingdom) Tom Sharp	IDL
2	R5	Donington Park, Leicestershire	17 April		(United Kingdom) Tom Sharp	(United Kingdom) Tom Sharp	IDL
2	R6	Donington Park, Leicestershire	17 April		(United Kingdom) Tom Sharp	(United Kingdom) Tom Sharp	IDL
3	R7	Thruxton Circuit, Hampshire	30 April	(United Kingdom) Carl Breeze	(United Kingdom) Carl Breeze	(United Kingdom) Carl Breeze	Total Control Racing
3	R8	Thruxton Circuit, Hampshire	1 May		(United Kingdom) Adam Morgan	(United Kingdom) Adam Morgan	Cicely Racing
3	R9	Thruxton Circuit, Hampshire	1 May		(United Kingdom) Adam Morgan	(United Kingdom) Carl Breeze	Total Control Racing
4	R10	Oulton Park, Cheshire	4 June	(United Kingdom) Carl Breeze	(United Kingdom) Nathan Freke	(United Kingdom) Nathan Freke	Century Motorsport
4	R11	Oulton Park, Cheshire	5 June		(United Kingdom) Nathan Freke	(United Kingdom) Stefan Hodgetts	JHR Developments
5	R12	Croft Circuit, North Yorkshire	18 June	(United Kingdom) Nathan Freke	(United Kingdom) Nathan Freke	(United Kingdom) Nathan Freke	Century Motorsport
5	R13	Croft Circuit, North Yorkshire	19 June		(United Kingdom) Tom Sharp	(United Kingdom) Tim Harvey	Total Control Racing
5	R14	Croft Circuit, North Yorkshire	19 June		(United Kingdom) Nathan Freke	(United Kingdom) Nathan Freke	Century Motorsport
6	R15	Snetterton Motor Racing Circuit, Norfolk	6 August	(United Kingdom) Carl Breeze	(United Kingdom) Nathan Freke	(United Kingdom) Carl Breeze	Total Control Racing
6	R16	Snetterton Motor Racing Circuit, Norfolk	6 August		(United Kingdom) Nathan Freke	(United Kingdom) Nathan Freke	Century Motorsport
6	R17	Snetterton Motor Racing Circuit, Norfolk	7 August		(United Kingdom) Nathan Freke	(United Kingdom) Adam Morgan	Cicely Racing
7	R18	Knockhill Racing Circuit, Fife	3 September	(United Kingdom) Nathan Freke	(United Kingdom) Tom Sharp	(United Kingdom) Nathan Freke	Century Motorsport
7	R19	Knockhill Racing Circuit, Fife	4 September		(United Kingdom) Nathan Freke	(United Kingdom) Nathan Freke	Century Motorsport
7	R20	Knockhill Racing Circuit, Fife	4 September		(United Kingdom) Tom Sharp	(United Kingdom) Tom Sharp	IDL
8	R21	Rockingham Motor Speedway, Northamptonshire	17 September	(United Kingdom) Carl Breeze	(United Kingdom) Carl Breeze	(United Kingdom) Carl Breeze	Total Control Racing
8	R22	Rockingham Motor Speedway, Northamptonshire	18 September		(United Kingdom) George Murrells	(United Kingdom) George Murrells	Optimum Motorsport
9	R23	Brands Hatch (GP), Kent	1 October	(United Kingdom) Carl Breeze	(United Kingdom) Adam Morgan	(United Kingdom) Carl Breeze	Total Control Racing
9	R24	Brands Hatch (GP), Kent	2 October		(United Kingdom) Carl Breeze	(United Kingdom) Carl Breeze	Total Control Racing
9	R25	Brands Hatch (GP), Kent	2 October		(United Kingdom) Colin White	(United Kingdom) Adam Morgan	Cicely Racing
10	R26	Silverstone (National), Northamptonshire	15 October	(United Kingdom) Adam Morgan	(United Kingdom) Carl Breeze	(United Kingdom) Tom Sharp	IDL
10	R27	Silverstone (National), Northamptonshire	16 October		(United Kingdom) Adam Morgan	(United Kingdom) Tom Sharp	IDL

== Championship standings ==
Pos	Driver	BHI			DON			THR			OUL		CRO			SNE			KNO			ROC		BHGP			SIL		Pen	Pts
G55 Supercup
1	(United Kingdom) Adam Morgan	2	2	Ret	3	2	Ret	2	1	2	4	4	2	6	7	3	3	1	4	3	4	3	2	3	3	1	2	2		694
2	(United Kingdom) Carl Breeze	3	9	2	2	NC	3	1	2	1	2	3	4	5	2	1	2	4	3	4	Ret	1	14	1	1	5	3	4		689
3	(United Kingdom) Tom Sharp	1	1	1	1	1	1	4	8	3	12	6	13	3	Ret	4	4	3	2	2	1	4	13	2	2	Ret	1	1	9	683
4	(United Kingdom) Nathan Freke	17	10	3	Ret	Ret	4	3	Ret	Ret	1	2	1	4	1	2	1	2	1	1	2	2	3	4	4	2	5	3		638
5	(United Kingdom) Colin White	5	4	Ret	8	5	8	6	3	6	5	Ret	3	11	8	Ret	6	Ret	6	13	12	7	9	5	6	4	6	6		443
6	(United Kingdom) George Murrells	4	3	4	4	3	6	10	4	4	6	12	6	Ret	9	7	16	6				6	1				4	5		411
7	(United Kingdom) Alistair James	8	12	7	Ret	13	Ret	8	5	Ret	15	9	7	10	Ret	13	10	Ret									11	16	6	202
8	(United Kingdom) Freddie Hetherington				5	4	2				Ret	5										5	4				7	8		164
9	(Switzerland) Joachim Ritter	6	5	Ret	Ret	6	9	Ret	6	5	14	DNS																		124
10	(United Kingdom) Phil Broad															5	8	5						6	5	3				120
11	(United Kingdom) Lee Pattison															6	5	7	7	12	5									106
12	(United Kingdom) Stefan Hodgetts										3	1	Ret	2	Ret															91
13	(United Kingdom) Fergus Walkinshaw															Ret	9	11	Ret	8	DNS	Ret	7	Ret	11	Ret	9	DSQ	21	75
14	(United Kingdom) Mark Steward	Ret	15	12				14	12	10																				71
15	(United Kingdom) Marino Franchitti																		5	9	3									64
16	(United Kingdom) Clint Bardwell	7	6	5																										54
17	(United Kingdom) Patrick Watts																							7	7	14				50
18	(United Kingdom) Tim Harvey												Ret	1	Ret															35
19	(Australia) Jordan Skinner	Ret	Ret	Ret	12	12	Ret																							32
20	(United Kingdom) David McDonald																										17	7		26
21	(United Kingdom) Jamie Orton																										14	Ret		11
G50 Cup
1	(United Kingdom) Tom Ingram	13	8	6	6	Ret	7	5	7	7	7	10	5	Ret	Ret	16	14	15	10	7	6	8	5	10	9	7				664
2	(United Kingdom) Aaron Williamson	Ret	13	9	10	Ret	12	7	9	Ret	9	7	9	8	3	10	Ret	10	8	6	8	12	10	8	8	6	Ret	12	6	605
3	(United Kingdom) Jody Fannin	9	16	10	11	7	DSQ	11	10	9	11	11	10	9	5	9	11	9	11	5	10	11	12	12	14	11	18	Ret		590
4	(United Kingdom) Jake Hill	Ret	11	Ret	7	9	5	15	15	8	8	8	8	DSQ	6	8	Ret	12	9	15	7	10	8	Ret	10	8	8	9	18	585
5	(United Kingdom) Andrew Richardson	10	7	DNS	Ret	Ret	Ret	9	13	Ret			11	7	DNS	11	7	8				9	6	9	13	9	10	10		452
6	(United Kingdom) Robert Gaffney	11	Ret	8	9	10	11	12	14	11														14	16	13	15	15		266
7	(United Kingdom) Louise Richardson	12	Ret	DNS	13	8	10	13	11	Ret						14	12	14				Ret	DNS	11	12	10	Ret	DNS		262
8	(Republic of Ireland) Connaire Finn	14	14	Ret	14	11	Ret				13	Ret				12	13	Ret	12	10	9								6	196
9	(United Kingdom) Lee Pattison										10	Ret	12	12	4							13	11							130
10	(United Kingdom) Michael Doyle															15	15	13	Ret	11	11	Ret	15							108
11	(United Kingdom) Mark Johnston																							Ret	15	Ret	12	14		62
12	(United Kingdom) Mark Davies																										13	11		48
13	(United Kingdom) Martin Thomas	15	Ret	11																										36
14	(United Kingdom) Gary Duckman																							13	DSQ	12				34
15	(United Kingdom) Trevor Keats																										16	17		32
16	(United Kingdom) Jake Rattenbury																										Ret	13		20
17	(United Kingdom) Josh Fielding																		Ret	14	Ret									18
18	(United Kingdom) Paul McClughan	16	Ret	DNS																										14
Pos	Driver	BHI			DON			THR			OUL		CRO			SNE			KNO			ROC		BHGP			SIL		Pen	Pts

== Ginetta GT Winter Cup ==
The Ginetta GT Winter Cup was planned as to be the inaugural Ginetta GT Winter Cup. The series was set to feature two 2-hour endurance races, incorporating Ginetta G40, G50 and G55 models, however the championship was shelved.|}
