= Finesse Motorsport =

British motor racing team

(United Kingdom) Finesse Motorsport
- Founded: 2008
- Team principal(s): Neil Giddings
- Current series: BTCC; Renault Clio Cup UK
- Former series: Ginetta GT Supercup; Ginetta Junior Championship
- Website: http://www.finessemotorsportltd.co.uk

Finesse Motorsport is a British motor racing team based in Wisbech, Cambridgeshire founded by Neil Giddings. They have raced on the TOCA support package in the Ginetta GT Supercup, Ginetta Junior Championship and Renault Clio Cup United Kingdom before stepping up to the British Touring Car Championship in 2013.

== TOCA Support Series ==
Finesse Motorsport was formed in November 2008 by Neil Giddings, the team entered the Ginetta Junior Championship in 2009 to run a car for Neil's son Jake Giddings.

The team entered the Ginetta G50 Cup starting with the Snetterton round of the 2010 season with Aaron Williamson. When the championship became the Ginetta GT Supercup in 2011, FML stayed on with Williamson. A Ginetta G55 was added for Fergus Walkinshaw for the Knockhill and Rockingham rounds.

The team joined the Renault Clio Cup United Kingdom for the 2012 season with Jake Giddings and Aaron Williamson. The team returned for the 2013 season running a single car for Giddings.

== British Touring Car Championship ==
=== Chevrolet Cruze (2013) ===
Finesse Motorsport entered a partnership with Tech-Speed Motorsport to run a Super 2000 Chevrolet Cruze for Joe Girling in the Jack Sears Trophy under the M247 Racing banner in 2013. Girling decided to take a sabbatical from the BTCC after the mid–season break and the car was returned to Finesse Motorsport who entered it for the Knockhill round with Scottish teenager Aiden Moffat driving. He became the youngest driver in BTCC history at the age of 16 years, 10 months and 28 days.
