= Tom Ingram =

British racing driver (born 1993)

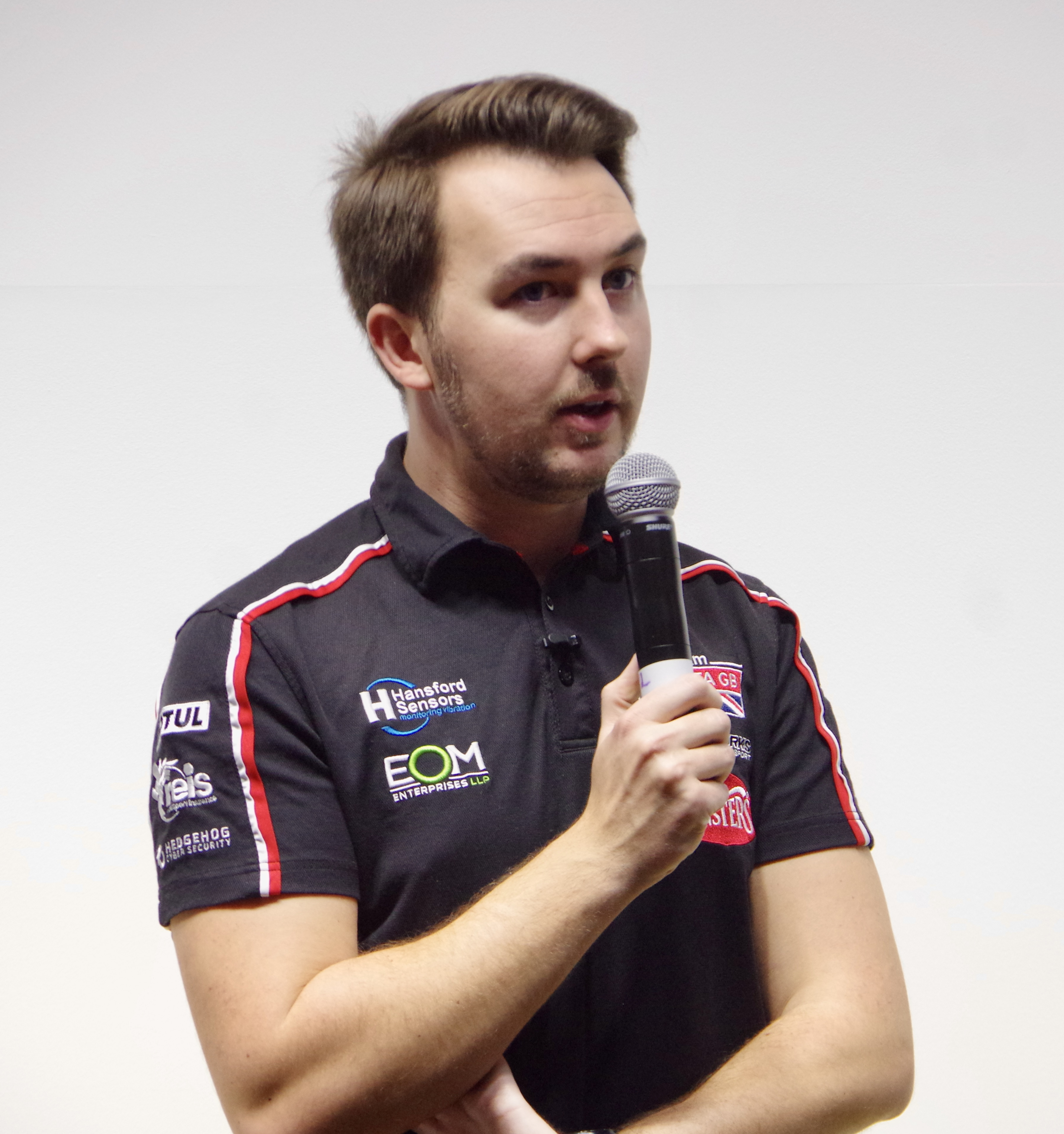
- Ingram in 2020
- Nationality: (United Kingdom) British
- Born: 20 August 1993 (age 33) High Wycombe, England

British Touring Car Championship career
- Debut season: 2014
- Current team: Team VERTU
- Categorisation: FIA Gold
- Car number: 80
- Starts: 386
- Wins: 45
- Podiums: 123
- Poles: 12
- Fastest laps: 53
- Best finish: 1st in 2022 and 2025

Previous series
- 2017 2015 2013 2011–13 2010 2009–10: 24H Series; GT Cup; MG Trophy; Ginetta GT Supercup; Ginetta GT Challenge; Ginetta Junior Championship

Championship titles
- 2022, 2025 2017–18 2013 2011 2010: British Touring Car Championship; BTCC Independents' Trophy; Ginetta GT Supercup (G55); Ginetta GT Supercup (G50); Ginetta Junior Championship

Awards
- 2025 2022 2011: Goodyear Wingfoot Award; Autosport National Driver of the Year; BRDC Rising Star

Tom Ingram (born 20 August 1993) is a British racing driver who competes in the British Touring Car Championship for Team VERTU. Having won the Ginetta Junior Championship in 2010 and the G50 class of the Ginetta GT Supercup in 2011, Ingram was named a British Racing Drivers' Club Rising Star in 2011. He won his first BTCC race at the first round of the 2016 season at Brands Hatch. Ingram is the 2022 and 2025 BTCC drivers' champion.

== Karting ==
=== 2001 ===
Born in High Wycombe, Ingram started his racing career at the age of eight, karting in the Open Cadet Class. In his first five races, he came third once and won four novice awards, racing in the Formula 6, Buckmore Park and Bayfords Meadows Summer Championships. In the winter of that same year, Ingram also competed in the Sandown Park Kart Club Championship and finished second. In his second year of the Open Cadet karts, he won eight of the 12 races in Formula 6, and six of the eight rounds in the Bayford Meadows Summer Championship winning both championships. He also set three lap records at three different circuits.

=== 2002 ===
In September 2002, Ingram stepped up to the F6 Honda Cadet Championship and the Bayford Meadows Winter Championship and won all three races and the championship.

=== 2003 ===
In 2003, Ingram took delivery of a brand new Project One Honda Cadet chassis and used this for the rest of the season which was the National "O" plate finishing third overall he also won the Lydd Championship and came second in both the Bayford Meadows and Buckmore Park Club Championships. He also finished third in the Formula 6 Championship.

=== 2004 ===
Later in 2004, Ingram contested in the Super 2 National Championship and the Formula 6 Championship. He finished second in the F6 and sixth in the National 4 stroke Championships. In October 2004, he changed classes to 2 stroke Rotax Minimax using a Tonykart Chassis (the minimax is a class that uses an adult sized chassis and 125cc water cooled 2-stroke Rotax engine).

=== 2005 ===
In 2005, Ingram managed to finish third in the Buckmore Park winter championship, fourth in the Bayford Meadows Winter Championship and first in the Lydd Winter Championships. He also finished second in both Buckmore Park and Bayford Meadows Summer Championships and gained many other notable results in the year including second in The Brazilian Cup and first in the Renault Champion of Champions meeting his first major win.

=== 2006 ===
In 2006, Ingram won his first ever British Championship which was The BRDC Minimax Stars of Tomorrow Championship. 2006 also saw Ingram compete in the Super 1 British Kart Championship, but a bad accident in the second round saw him hospitalised and out of the championship. Ingram was voted local Sports Personality of the year.

=== 2007 ===
2007 saw Ingram compete in the BRDC Stars of Tomorrow Junior Max Championship, in which he finished eighth. He also won the Brazilian Cup at Whilton Mill. Ingram was voted local Sports Personality for the Year for the second year in a row.

=== 2008 ===
In Ingram's final year in Karts, he competed in every major competition in the UK including Stars of Tomorrow, Super 1, Kartmasters but struggled with finances and missed some of the rounds.

== Motor racing ==
=== 2009 ===
In his debut season in cars, Ingram competed in the Ginetta Junior Championship, which is a one-make support championship for young drivers between 14-17 year olds on the BTCC (British Touring Car Championship) package, racing Ginetta G20s. He finished 12th in the championship after missing six rounds due to funding issues. He managed to get onto the podium in his second race as well as getting two pole positions and five top-five finishes.

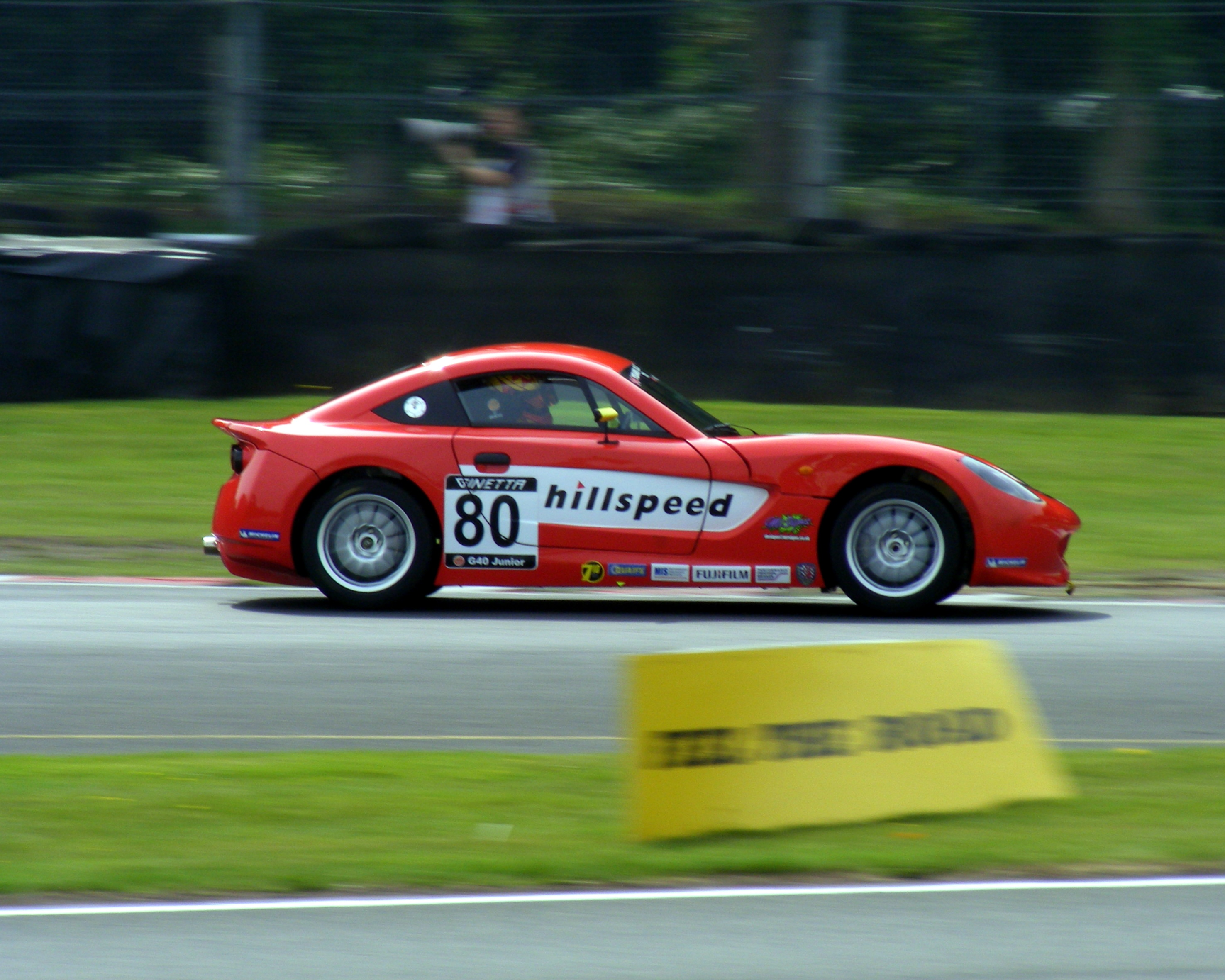
Tom Ingram during the 2010 Ginetta Junior Championship.

=== 2010 ===
2010 saw Ingram win the Ginetta Junior Championship with the Hillspeed team getting 13 podiums, eight fastest laps, five wins and six pole positions.

This year, the Ginetta G20 had been replaced by the new Ginetta G40. As a prize for winning the championship, Ingram had a full day's testing with Pirtek British Touring Car team finishing the day just half a second off the time set by Andrew Jordan set in the morning. During the winter of 2010, Ingram made it into the final four of the Formula Renault Racing Steps Foundation Scholarship.

=== 2011 ===
In 2011, Ingram became a BRDC Rising Star. Despite limited testing he won the Ginetta GT Supercup championship driving for Plans Motorsport in a Ginetta G50 with two rounds to spare; he managed to pick up ten wins and a total of 18 podiums, 13 fastest laps and 13 pole positions starts. Ingram also made it into the final four of the Porsche Supercup Scholarship.

=== 2012 ===
2012 saw Ingram compete in the Ginetta G55 class of the Ginetta GT Supercup racing for JHR Developments, Ingram won Jason Plato's newly launched KX Academy scholarship and secures funding and mentoring for the rest of the season. During this season Ingram had six wins, 17 podiums, finished third in the championship. Ingram was voted Radio Le Mans "Young Driver of the Year".

=== 2013 ===
For 2013, Ingram remained with JHR Developments in his Ginetta G55 in the Ginetta GT Supercup. Ingram was invited to drive a MG ZR 190 for MG dealer Brown & Gammons at the MG Live event at Silverstone. He qualified on pole, and won race 1 by over six seconds, also taking the fastest lap. In race 2, he won by almost 16 seconds and took the fastest lap again.

Ingram finished the season as the 2013 Ginetta GT Supercup Champion with 22 consecutive podiums, 11 wins, nine seconds, two thirds, five poles and 15 fastest laps.

Ingram was the only member of Jason Plato's KX academy to win a championship.

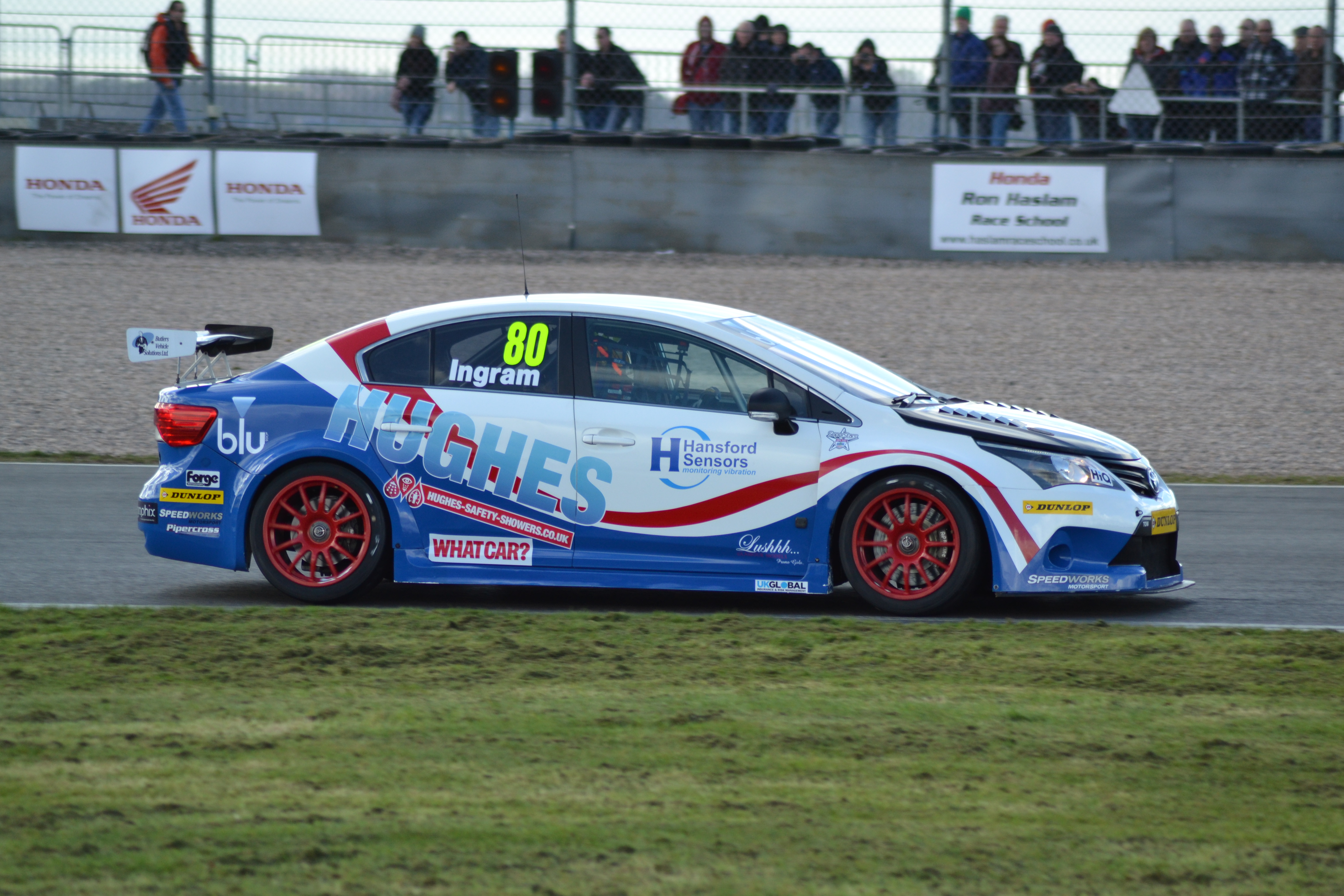
Ingram driving the Speedworks Motorsport Toyota Avensis at Donington Park during the 2014 British Touring Car Championship season.

=== 2014 ===
Ingram made his debut in the British Touring Car Championship, driving for Speedworks Motorsport in their Toyota Avensis. Despite this being one of the first NGTC cars, Ingram made some good progress with 13 top-ten finishes.

=== 2015 ===
Ingram re-signed for Speedworks Motorsports in their very heavily revised Toyota Avensis. In race three at Rockingham, Ingram secured his first ever podium after a titanic battle with his former mentor Jason Plato and, despite swapping the lead on a couple of occasions, he finished second. This race was voted by the fans as the best race of the season. In the season finale, Ingram secured his second podium with another second place.

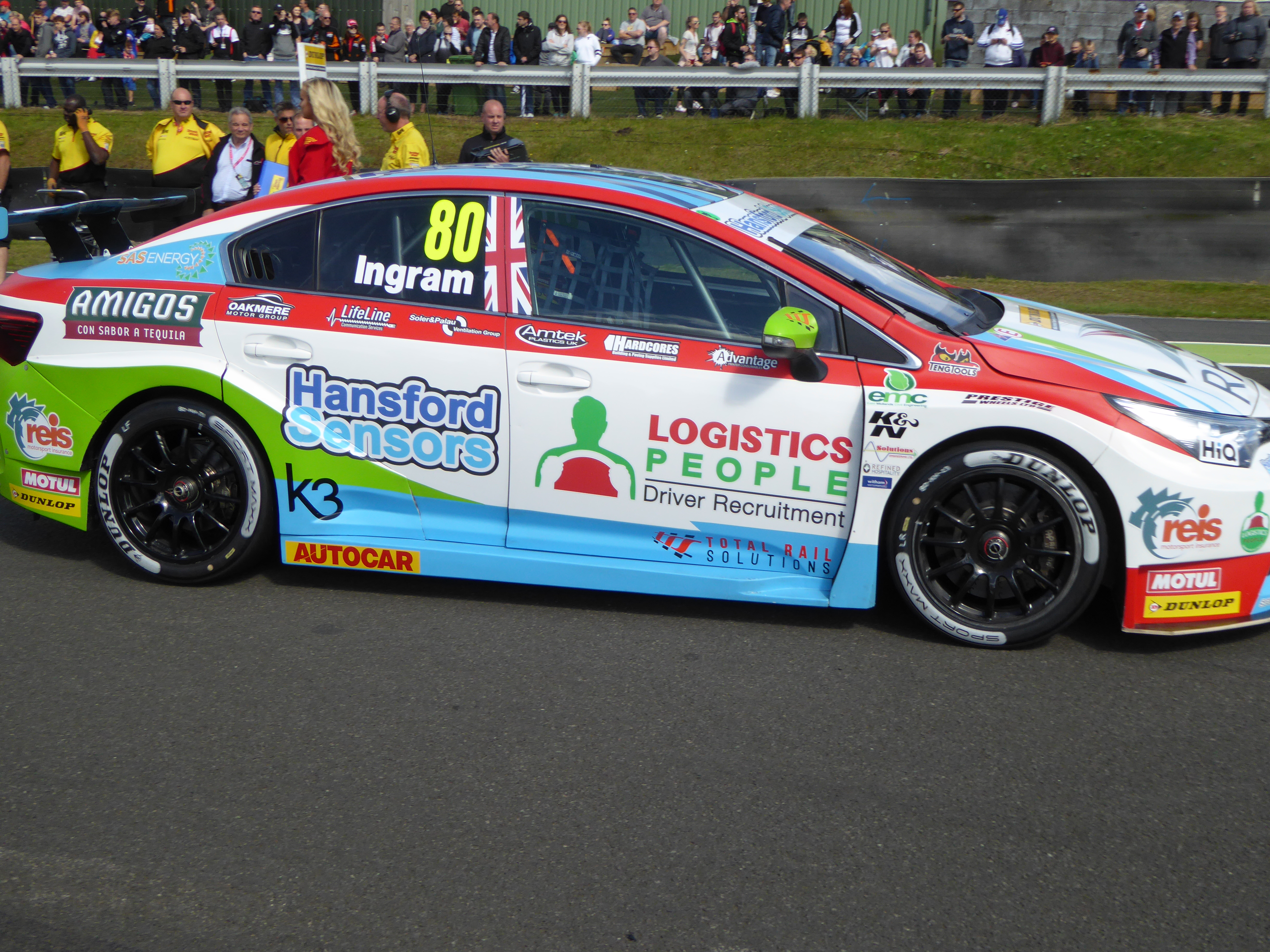
Ingram, at the Knockhill round of the 2017 British Touring Car Championship.

=== 2016 ===
Ingram re-signed for Speedworks Motorsports in the Toyota Avensis, and at the Brands Hatch Indy circuit, he qualified on pole for the first race of the season, setting a new Touring Car lap record of 47.994 and then went on to secure his first British Touring Car Championship race win. He also secured his first Independents Cup race win.

In the second meeting at Donington Park, Ingram secured his second podium of the year with a third place in race one.

=== 2017 ===
Racing with Speedworks again in 2017, Ingram topped the timesheets at pre-season testing with his Toyota. He took second place on the grid for the first race of the 2017 season at Brands Hatch, and went on to win the opening race of the season as he had in 2016. However, in the second race his car twice failed to start, and Ingram would have taken a drive through penalty had the race not been red flagged for a crash involving Jason Plato. Struggling with his car due to the ballast on his car, Ingram finished third behind Gordon Shedden and Rob Collard. He became the first driver to score two race wins in 2017 after winning Race 2 at Donington Park. After Race 3, he was four points behind Gordon Shedden in the championship, but Shedden was later excluded from the results leaving Ingram in the championship lead.

=== 2018 ===
Ingram continued to race for Speedworks in 2018, going into the final round at Brands Hatch with an outside chance of winning the championship, starting the day 33 points behind championship leader Colin Turkington. Race 1 saw Turkington extend his championship lead to 36 points. Fighting back in Race 2, Ingram went from 14th to fourth, despite Turkington slipping down the order, it wasn’t enough to claim the overall title. Ingram carried on to win the 2018 Independents’ title for a second year in a row.

=== 2019 ===
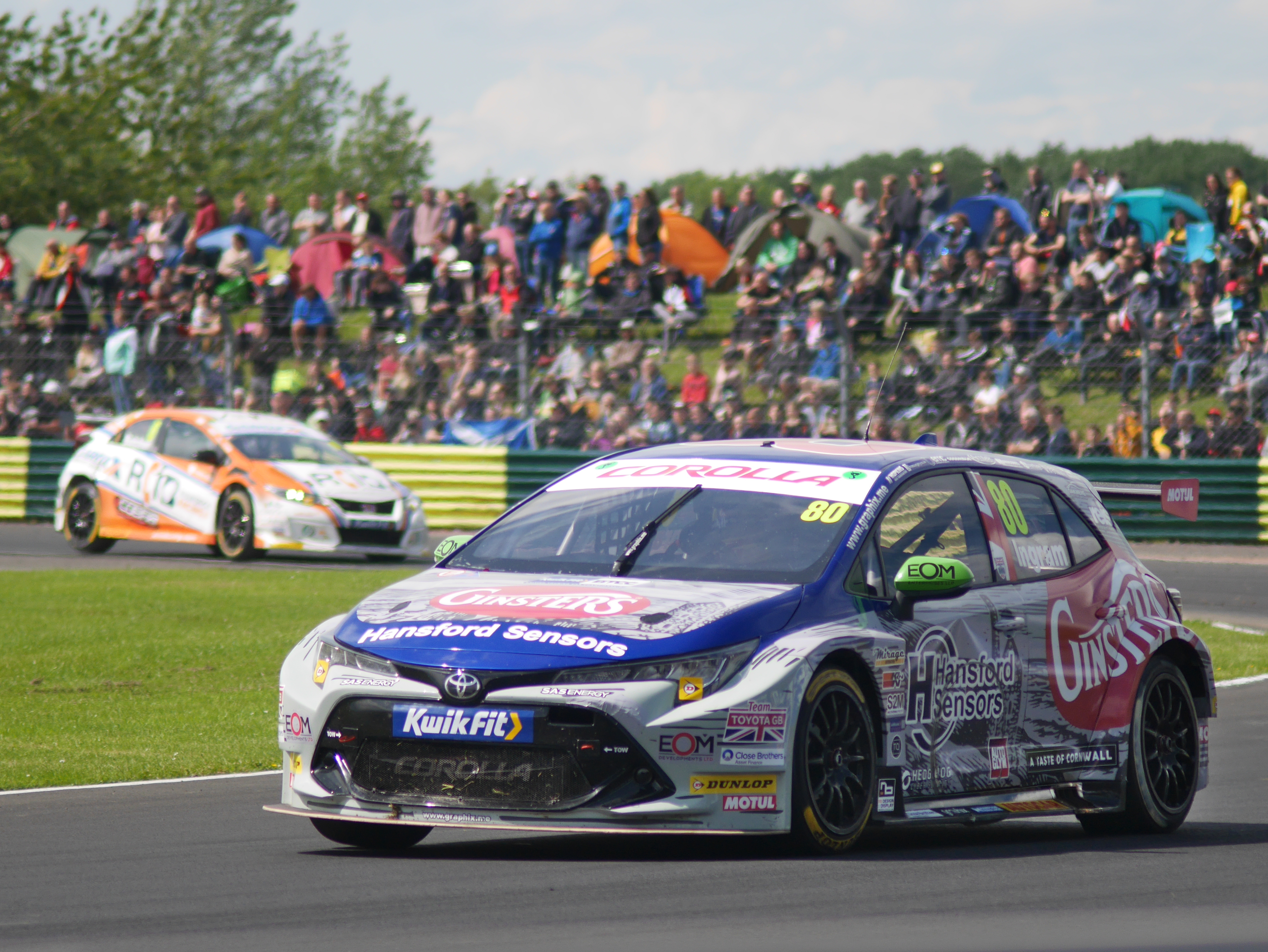
Ingram driving the Toyota Corolla at Croft Circuit in 2019.

Speedworks 2019 saw the birth of the brand new Toyota Corolla and the team changing into a manufacturer. In only its sixth race, Ingram took the new car to its first of four wins that year and this win was in front of 4000 employees from the nearby Toyota factory. Developing this new car was harder as it was a single car team, but the team was capable of getting on top of some of the early handling issues, and by the end of the season the car was looking a lot more stable.

=== 2020 ===
After a development year with the new car, Ingram stayed with Speedworks for the seventh consecutive year, during which the winter the team was busy developing refinements. Ingram had three wins and a total of 11 podiums with four non scores, Ingram was still in the title shootout at the season finale.

=== 2021 ===
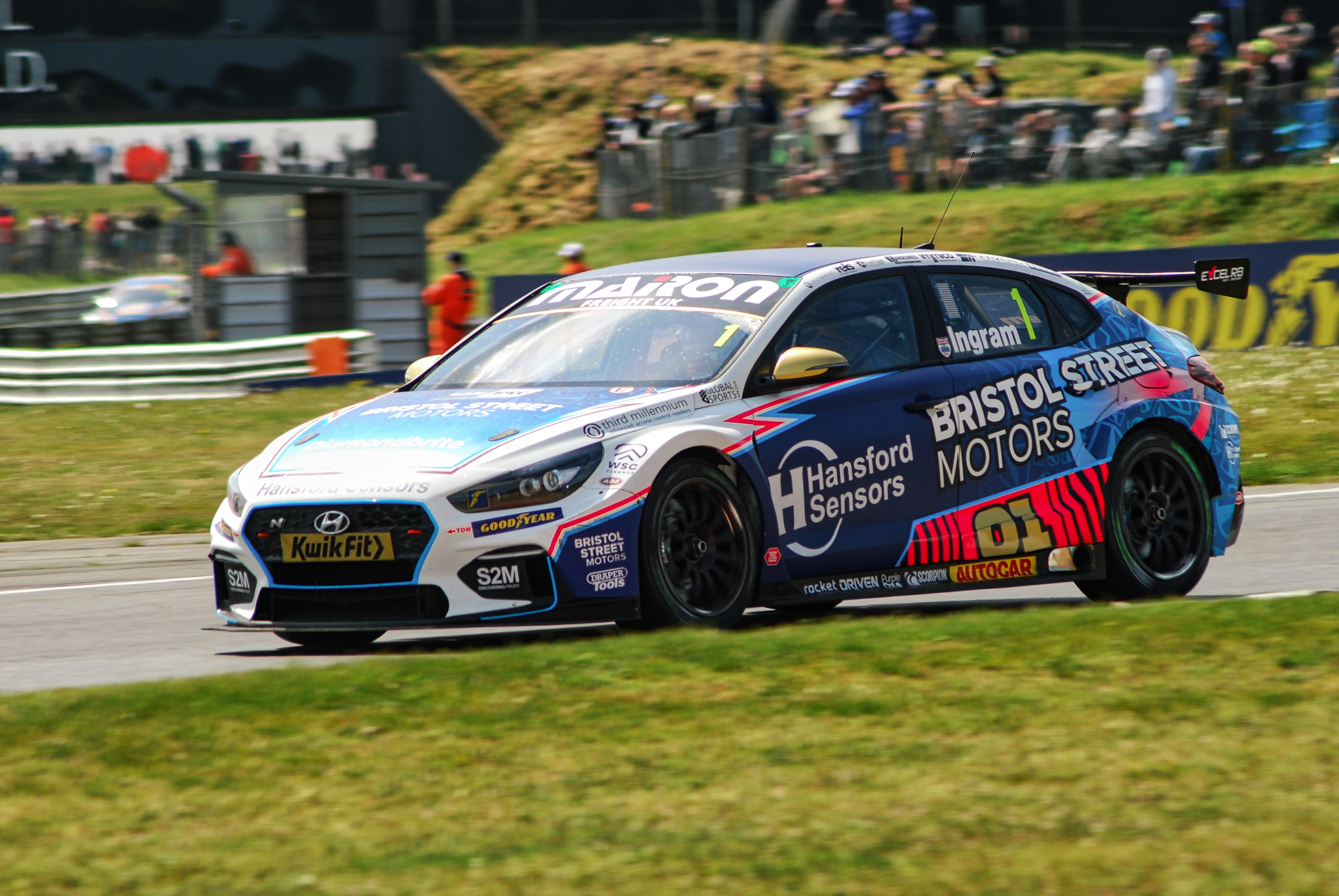
Ingram racing at Snetterton during the 2023 British Touring Car Championship.

The 2021 season would see the end of an Ingram's run with Speedworks, with the driver and team parting ways due to conflicting requirements of sponsors. Ingram went on to sign with EXCELR8 Trade Price Cars, driving their Hyundai i30 Fastback.

== Racing record ==
=== Racing career summary ===
Season	Series	Team	Races	Wins	Poles	F/Laps	Podiums	Points	Position
2009	Ginetta Junior Championship	Tockwith Motorsport	14	0	2	0	1	196	12th
2010	Ginetta Junior Championship	Hillspeed	20	5	6	8	13	556	**1st**
2011	Ginetta GT Supercup - G50	Plans Motorsport	25	10	7	13	18	664	**1st**
2012	Ginetta GT Supercup - G55	JHR Developments	26	6	4	6	17	658	**3rd**
2013	Ginetta GT Supercup - G55	JHR Developments	25	11	5	15	22	763	**1st**
2013	MG Trophy	N/A	2	2	2	2	2	N/A	NC†
2014	British Touring Car Championship	Speedworks Motorsport	30	0	0	0	0	121	14th
2015	British Touring Car Championship	Speedworks Motorsport	30	0	0	0	2	173	13th
2015	GT Cup UK - GTC	Ebor GT/Hoggarth Racing	4	1	0	0	3	455	**2nd**
2016	British Touring Car Championship	Speedworks Motorsport	30	2	2	0	6	219	10th
2017	British Touring Car Championship	Speedworks Motorsport	30	4	0	2	9	311	**3rd**
2017	24H Series - SP3-GT4	Speedworks Motorsport	1	0	0	1	0	?	?
2018	British Touring Car Championship	Speedworks Motorsport	30	3	0	5	9	292	**2nd**
2019	British Touring Car Championship	Team Toyota GB with Ginsters	30	4	1	1	4	245	6th
2020	British Touring Car Championship	Toyota Gazoo Racing UK with Ginsters	27	3	1	4	11	326	4th
2020	GT Cup Championship - GTH	Speedworks Motorsport	4	0	0	0	0	0	NC†
2021	British Touring Car Championship	Ginsters EXCELR8 with TradePriceCars.com	30	3	0	3	9	309	4th
2022	British Touring Car Championship	Bristol Street Motors with EXCELR8 TradePriceCars.com	30	6	2	7	12	394	**1st**
2023	British Touring Car Championship	Bristol Street Motors with EXCELR8	30	2	0	5	17	400	**2nd**
2023	British GT Championship - GT4	MKH Racing	1	0	0	0	0	0	NC†
2024	British Touring Car Championship	Team Bristol Street Motors	30	6	4	10	15	413	**2nd**
2025	British Touring Car Championship	Team VERTU	30	7	2	9	18	462	**1st**
2026	British Touring Car Championship	Team VERTU	30	5	0	5	13	387	**2nd**

^{†} As Ingram was a guest driver, he was ineligible for points.

=== Complete British Touring Car Championship results ===
(key) Races in bold indicate pole position (1 point awarded – just in first race) Races in italics indicate fastest lap (1 point awarded) * signifies that driver lead race for at least one lap (1 point awarded) ^{Superscript} number indicates points-scoring qualifying race position

Year	Team	Car	1	2	3	4	5	6	7	8	9	10	11	12	13	14	15	16	17	18	19	20	21	22	23	24	25	26	27	28	29	30	DC	Points
2014	Speedworks Motorsport	Toyota Avensis	BRH; 1; 9	BRH; 2; 8	BRH; 3 Ret	DON; 1; 10	DON; 2; 10	DON; 3 DSQ	THR; 1; 13	THR; 2; 12	THR; 3; 13	OUL; 1; 9	OUL; 2; 7	OUL; 3 Ret	CRO; 1; 15	CRO; 2; 8	CRO; 3 Ret	SNE; 1 Ret	SNE; 2 Ret	SNE; 3; 17	KNO; 1; 7	KNO; 2; 7	KNO; 3; 9	ROC; 1; 13	ROC; 2 Ret	ROC; 3; 11	SIL; 1 Ret	SIL; 2; 26	SIL; 3; 19	BRH; 1; 8	BRH; 2; 5	BRH; 3; 9	15th	121
2015	Speedworks Motorsport	Toyota Avensis	BRH; 1; 10	BRH; 2; 6	BRH; 3; 6	DON; 1; 16	DON; 2; 13	DON; 3; 10	THR; 1; 10	THR; 2 Ret	THR; 3; 10	OUL; 1; 8	OUL; 2; 11	OUL; 3; 9	CRO; 1; 8	CRO; 2; 8	CRO; 3; 7	SNE; 1; 10	SNE; 2 Ret	SNE; 3; 9	KNO; 1 Ret	KNO; 2; 13	KNO; 3; 16	ROC; 1; 5	ROC; 2; 10	**ROC**; **3**; 2*	SIL; 1; 9	SIL; 2; 13	SIL; 3; 11	BRH; 1; 25	BRH; 2; 2	BRH; 3 Ret	13th	173
2016	Speedworks Motorsport	Toyota Avensis	**BRH**; **1**; 1*	**BRH**; **2** Ret*	BRH; 3; 17	DON; 1; 3	DON; 2; 15	DON; 3; 19	**THR**; **1**; 2	THR; 2; 20	THR; 3 Ret	OUL; 1; 5	OUL; 2; 5	OUL; 3; 4	CRO; 1; 9	CRO; 2; 7	CRO; 3; 3	SNE; 1; 6	SNE; 2; 7	SNE; 3; 12	KNO; 1; 4	KNO; 2 Ret	KNO; 3; 12	ROC; 1; 16	ROC; 2 Ret	ROC; 3 Ret	SIL; 1; 1*	**SIL**; **2**; 3*	SIL; 3 Ret	BRH; 1; 14	BRH; 2; 9	BRH; 3; 6	10th	219
2017	Speedworks Motorsport	Toyota Avensis	BRH; 1; 1*	**BRH**; **2**; 3*	BRH; 3; 11	DON; 1; 5	DON; 2; 1*	DON; 3; 5	THR; 1; 4	THR; 2; 3	THR; 3; 2	OUL; 1 Ret	OUL; 2 Ret	OUL; 3; 26	CRO; 1; 8	CRO; 2 Ret	CRO; 3; 16	SNE; 1; 8	SNE; 2; 10	SNE; 3; 6	KNO; 1; 6	KNO; 2; 8	KNO; 3; 1*	ROC; 1 DNS	ROC; 2; 9	ROC; 3; 8	SIL; 1; 1*	**SIL**; **2**; 2*	SIL; 3; 4	BRH; 1; 2	BRH; 2; 6	BRH; 3; 4	3rd	311
2018	Speedworks Motorsport	Toyota Avensis	BRH; 1; 4	BRH; 2; 11*	BRH; 3; 1*	DON; 1; 14	DON; 2; 1*	DON; 3; 8	THR; 1 Ret	THR; 2; 12	THR; 3; 7	OUL; 1; 15	OUL; 2; 10	OUL; 3; 6	CRO; 1; 3	CRO; 2; 2*	CRO; 3; 9	SNE; 1 Ret	SNE; 2; 3	SNE; 3; 3	ROC; 1 Ret	ROC; 2; 3	ROC; 3; 5	KNO; 1; 6	KNO; 2 DSQ	KNO; 3; 16	SIL; 1; 15	SIL; 2; 1*	SIL; 3; 2	BRH; 1; 14	BRH; 2; 4	BRH; 3; 5	2nd	292
2019	Team Toyota GB with Ginsters	Toyota Corolla	BRH; 1; 13	BRH; 2; 5	BRH; 3; 10	DON; 1; 5	DON; 2; 10	**DON**; **3**; 1*	THR; 1; 12	THR; 2; 8	THR; 3; 5	CRO; 1; 11	CRO; 2; 7	CRO; 3; 16	OUL; 1; 7	OUL; 2; 8	OUL; 3 Ret	**SNE**; **1**; 1*	**SNE**; **2**; 23*	SNE; 3; 8	THR; 1; 11	THR; 2; 8	THR; 3; 8	KNO; 1; 8	KNO; 2; 6	KNO; 3; 5	SIL; 1; 1*	**SIL**; **2**; 1*	SIL; 3; 22	BRH; 1; 23	BRH; 2; 21	BRH; 3; 7	6th	245
2020	Toyota Gazoo Racing UK with Ginsters	Toyota Corolla	DON; 1; 4	DON; 2; 4	DON; 3; 6	BRH; 1; 4	BRH; 2; 2	BRH; 3 Ret	OUL; 1; 6	OUL; 2; 5	OUL; 3 Ret	KNO; 1; 4	KNO; 2; 3	KNO; 3; 10	THR; 1; 1*	**THR**; **2**; 1*	THR; 3; 5	SIL; 1; 2	SIL; 2; 25*	SIL; 3 Ret	CRO; 1; 13	CRO; 2; 4	CRO; 3; 1*	SNE; 1; 2	SNE; 2; 2	SNE; 3; 8	**BRH**; **1**; 3*	BRH; 2; 2	BRH; 3; 2				4th	326
2021	Ginsters Excelr8 with TradePriceCars.com	Hyundai i30 Fastback N Performance	THR; 1; 2	THR; 2; 6	THR; 3; 22	SNE; 1; 2	SNE; 2; 4	SNE; 3; 1*	BRH; 1; 6	BRH; 2; 1*	BRH; 3; 12	OUL; 1; 19	OUL; 2; 10	OUL; 3; 21	KNO; 1; 10	KNO; 2; 6	KNO; 3; 1*	THR; 1; 10	THR; 2; 12	THR; 3; 5	CRO; 1; 12	CRO; 2; 4	CRO; 3; 4	SIL; 1; 2*	SIL; 2; 2	SIL; 3; 12	DON; 1; 11	DON; 2; 2*	DON; 3; 10	BRH; 1; 13	BRH; 2; 12	BRH; 3; 3	4th	300
2022	Bristol Street Motors with Excelr8 TradePriceCars.com	Hyundai i30 Fastback N Performance	DON; 1; 1*	**DON**; **2**; 2*	DON; 3; 5	BRH; 1; 2	BRH; 2; 5	BRH; 3; 4	THR; 1; 21	THR; 2; 8	THR; 3; 6	**OUL**; **1**; 1*	**OUL**; **2**; 1*	OUL; 3; 17	CRO; 1; 4	CRO; 2; 2	CRO; 3; 7	KNO; 1; 6	KNO; 2; 4	KNO; 3; 12	SNE; 1; 3	SNE; 2; 3	SNE; 3; 3	THR; 1; 9	THR; 2; 6	THR; 3; 7	SIL; 1; 5	SIL; 2; 5	SIL; 3; 1*	**BRH**; **1**; 1*	**BRH**; **2**; 1*	BRH; 3; 5	1st	394
2023	Bristol Street Motors with EXCELR8	Hyundai i30 Fastback N Performance	DON; 1; 3	DON; 2; 9	DON; 3; 2	BRH; 1; 5	BRH; 2; 2	BRH; 3; 3	SNE; 1; 4	SNE; 2; 7	SNE; 3; 1*	THR; 1; 2	THR; 2; 2	THR; 3; 9	OUL; 1; 3	OUL; 2; 3	OUL; 3; 4	CRO; 1; 6	CRO; 2; 4	CRO; 3; 2	KNO; 1 DSQ	KNO; 2; 10	KNO; 3; 3	DON; 1; 3*	DON; 2; 1*	DON; 3; 7	SIL; 1; 22	SIL; 2; 3	SIL; 3; 2	BRH; 1; 2	BRH; 2; 2	BRH; 3; 4	2nd	400
2024	Team Bristol Street Motors	Hyundai i30 Fastback N Performance	**DON**; **1**; 1*	**DON**; **2**; 1*	DON; 3; 4	BRH; 1; 7	BRH; 2; 2	BRH; 3; 18	SNE; 1; 6	SNE; 2; 16	SNE; 3; 4	**THR**; **1**; 4	THR; 2; 3*	THR; 3; 3	**OUL**; **1**; 1*	**OUL**; **2**; 2*	OUL; 3; 4	CRO; 1; 2	CRO; 2; 4*	CRO; 3; 3	KNO; 1 Ret	KNO; 2; 10	KNO; 3; 2*	DON; 1; 5	DON; 2 Ret	DON; 3; 2	**SIL**; **1**; 1*	**SIL**; **2**; 4*	SIL; 3; 1*	BRH; 1; 3	BRH; 2; 1*	BRH; 3; 6	2nd	413
2025	Team VERTU	Hyundai i30 Fastback N Performance	DON; 1; 2	DON; 2; 2	DON; 3; 2	BRH; 1; 3	BRH; 2; 11	BRH; 3; 3	SNE; 1; 2	SNE; 2 Ret	SNE; 3; 4	THR; 1; 1*	**THR**; **2**; 2	THR; 3; 2	**OUL**; **1**; 1*	**OUL**; **2**; 4*	OUL; 3; 4	**CRO**; **1**; 1*	**CRO**; **2**; 8	CRO; 3; 2*	KNO; 1; 3	KNO; 2; 1*	KNO; 3; 4	DON; 1; 2*	DON; 2; 4*	DON; 3; 1*	SIL; 1; 7	SIL; 2; 1*	SIL; 3; 5	BRH; 1; 5	BRH; 2; 1*	BRH; 3; 6	1st	462
2026	Team VERTU	Hyundai i30 Fastback N Performance	DON; 1 DSQ^{2}	DON; 2 Ret	DON; 3; 2	BRH; 1; 3^{5}	BRH; 2; 4	BRH; 3; 1*	SNE; 1; 2^{3}	SNE; 2 Ret*	SNE; 3; 8	OUL; 1; 3^{4}	OUL; 2; 2	OUL; 3; 3	THR; 1; 5^{2}	THR; 2; 5	THR; 3; 1*	KNO; 1; 5^{9}	KNO; 2 Ret	KNO; 3; 10	DON; 1; 9^{8}	DON; 2; 3	DON; 3; 9	CRO; 1; 3*^{5}	CRO; 2 Ret	CRO; 3 Ret	SIL; 1; 13^{12}	SIL; 2; 8	SIL; 3; 1*	BRH; 1; 1*^{2}	**BRH**; **2**; 1*	BRH; 3 Ret	2nd	387

=== Complete GT Cup Championship results ===
(key) (Races in bold indicate pole position in class – 1 point awarded just in first race; races in italics indicate fastest lap in class – 1 point awarded all races;-

Year	Team	Car	Class	1	2	3	4	5	6	7	8	9	10	11	12	13	14	15	16	17	18	19	20	DC	CP	Points
2020	Speedworks Motorsport	Toyota GR Supra GT4	GTH	SNE; 1	SNE; 2	SNE; 3	SNE; 4	SIL; 1	SIL; 2	SIL; 3	SIL; 4	DON1; 1; 15	DON1; 2; 11	DON1; 3; 15	DON1; 4; 13	BRH; 1	BRH; 2	BRH; 3	BRH; 4	DON2; 1	DON2; 2	DON2; 3	DON2; 4	NC†	NC†	0†

† Ingram was ineligible for points as he was an invitation entry.

=== Complete British GT Championship results ===
(key) (Races in bold indicate pole position) (Races in italics indicate fastest lap)

Year	Team	Car	Class	1	2	3	4	5	6	7	8	9	DC	Points
2023	MKH Racing	Aston Martin Vantage AMR GT4	GT4	OUL; 1	OUL; 2	SIL; 1	DON; 1	SNE; 1	SNE; 2	ALG; 1	BRH; 1	DON; 1; 27	NC†	0†

^{†} As Ingram was a guest driver, he was ineligible for points.

Sporting positions
Preceded by Sarah Moore	Ginetta Junior Championship; Champion; 2010	Succeeded by Seb Morris
Preceded by Frank Wrathall	Ginetta GT Supercup; G50 Cup Champion; 2011	Succeeded by Mark Davies
Preceded by Carl Breeze	Ginetta GT Supercup; Champion; 2013	Succeeded by Charlie Robertson
Preceded by Andrew Jordan	British Touring Car Championship; Independents' Trophy Winner; 2017-2018	Succeeded by Rory Butcher
Preceded by Ashley Sutton	British Touring Car Championship; Champion; 2022	Succeeded by Ashley Sutton
Preceded by Jake Hill	British Touring Car Championship; Champion; 2025	Succeeded by Ashley Sutton
Awards and achievements
Preceded by Ashley Sutton	Autosport Awards; National Driver of the Year; 2022	Succeeded by Freddie Slater
Preceded by Colin Turkington	Goodyear Wingfoot Award; Winner; 2025	Succeeded by None (Seasonal award ended) (Note: For 2026 the award was altered to reward a driver across each race weekend rather than to be contested throughout the season.)
