= Sarah Moore (racing driver) =

British racing driver

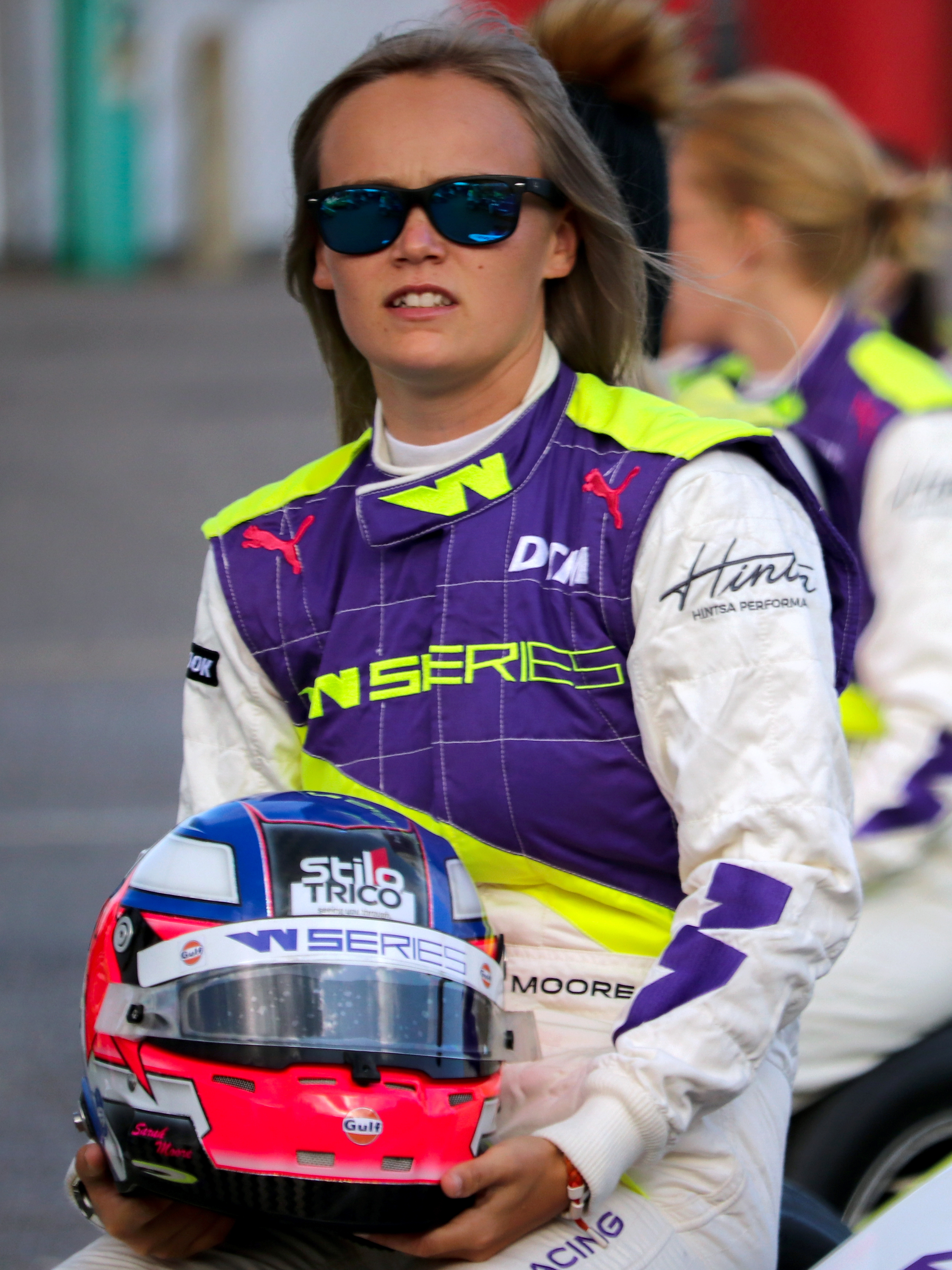
- Moore in 2019
- Nationality: (United Kingdom) British
- Born: Sarah Claire Moore; 22 October 1993 (age 33) Harrogate, North Yorkshire, England
- Relatives: Nigel Moore (brother); David Moore (brother); Edward Moore (brother)

W Series career
- Debut season: 2019
- Categorisation: FIA Silver
- Car number: 26
- Starts: 21
- Championships: 0
- Wins: 0
- Poles: 0
- Fastest laps: 0
- Best finish: 5th in 2021
- Finished last season: 11th (2022)

Previous series
- 2019-2022 2020 2019 2018 2018 2017 2017 2014 2011–2012 2012 2011 2007–2010 2007–2008 2007–2008: W Series; Porsche Sprint Challenge Great Britain; GT4 South European Series; Britcar Endurance Championship; Mighty Mini Championship; Mini Challenge; LMP3 Cup; VLN Endurance - Toyota GT86 Cup - 4Two Cup; Britcar Production Cup; InterSteps Championship; Ginetta Junior Championship; Ginetta Junior Winter Championship; BRDC SoT MiniMax

Championship titles
- 2023 2018 2009: Indian Racing League; Britcar Endurance; Ginetta Junior Championship

Awards
- 2010 2009 2009: BWRDC Lord Wakefield Award; British Club Driver of the Year; BRDC Rising Star
- Statistics up to date as of 15 September 2023.

Sarah Claire Moore (born 22 October 1993) is a British racing driver. She won the Ginetta Junior Championship in 2009 and competed in the InterSteps Championship in 2011. She was awarded the Rising Star status by the British Racing Drivers' Club in 2009. Moore was the first female racing driver to win a TOCA-sanctioned race, and the first to win a junior mixed-gender, national-level series in the UK. She is the first female to have won the Britcar Endurance Championship.

== Career ==
Moore, born in Harrogate, competed in the Rotax Mini Max class of the Stars of Tomorrow National Championship in 2007, finishing 24th. She also drove for Tockwith Motorsports in both the Ginetta Junior Championship and the Ginetta Junior Winter Championship. In the Ginetta Junior Championship, she entered the season finale at Brands Hatch, with her best result being 15th in the first race of the day. For 2008, she entered the BRDC Stars of Tomorrow MiniMax Championship, finishing 40th overall, but the Ginetta Junior Championship became her primary focus, as she competed in the full season for Tockwith Motorsports. She finished the season in 17th place, with her best race finish being a sixth place at Silverstone. She also entered the Ginetta Junior Championship Winter Series that year, finishing all four races on the podium, with one victory, and finishing as runner-up to Josh Hill.

Moore remained in the Ginetta Junior Championship in 2009 with Tockwith Motorsports, and won the title, having taken five wins, and scored sixteen more points than runner-up Jake Cook. She also became the first female driver to win a race in a series that formed part of the TOCA package, the first to win a mixed-gender series in the UK, and was awarded the BRDC Rising Star status. As a result of this, she was shortlisted for the BBC Young Sports Personality of the Year award, eventually being ranked fifth. In addition to this, she was named as the British Club Driver of the Year at the Autosport Awards, and joined the YourRacingCar.com scheme. The owner of Ginetta Cars, Lawrence Tomlinson, praised Moore, stating "Seeing Sarah go on stage at the awards in front of 1,400 industry heads has been one of the proudest moments in Ginetta's history."

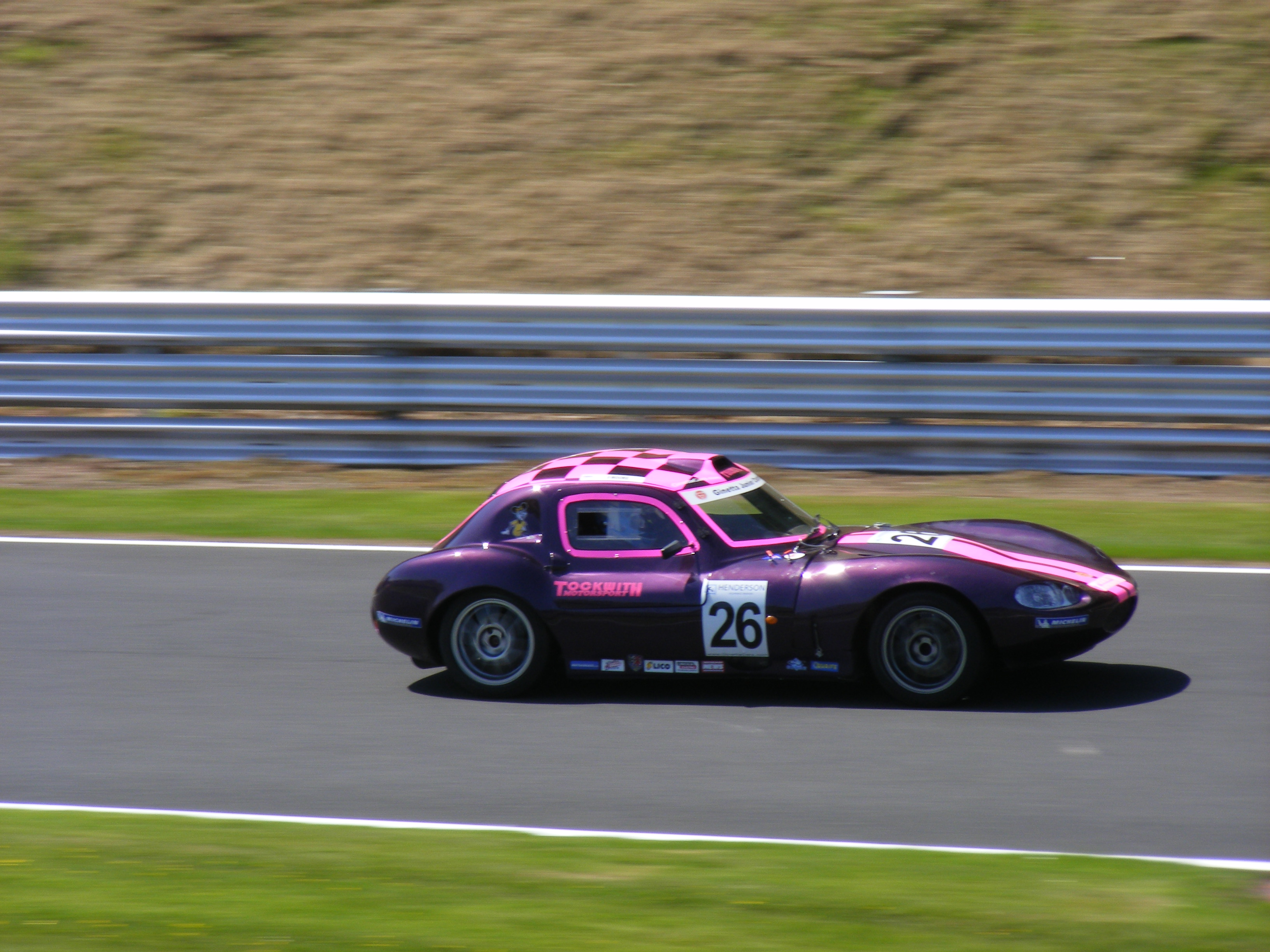
Sarah Moore during the 2009 Ginetta Junior Championship.

In 2010, Moore received the Lord Wakefield Award from the BWRDC. Sarah and her brother David switched to the Eurotech Racing team, but remained in the Ginetta Junior Championship. She was less successful that year, with the series having changed to the Ginetta G40; she didn't finish on the podium until the 17th race of the season, held at Donington Park, and finished seventh overall. In 2011, she graduated to the new InterSteps Championship series, and returned to the family-run Tockwith Motorsport team, who were entering under the "TMS Atlantic" name. Having taken two fourth-place finishes in the first two races, she eventually finished the season in sixth place. She also competed in the first ever series of the 4Two Cup that year, taking a single victory.

Moore entered the 4Two Cup again in 2012, finishing second twice out of the four the races held at Spa-Francorchamps, and third in both races held at Snetterton. Moore also drove a Smart ForTwo alongside her brother Nigel in the Donington Park round of the Britcar Production Cup that year, finishing 20th overall. Moore started in the reformed Britcar Endurance Championship in 2017, with professional Smart driver Rob Baker in a ForFour run by his S2Smarts team. She drove in the last three rounds of the championship, and in the end, Moore and Baker were fourth in the overall Sprint category standings and first in class. In round six at Oulton Park, she raced alongside her brother, Ed and father, Simon, who were both in Tockwith Ginetta G50s. Sarah upgraded to a Ginetta G50 with Tockwith Motorsport in the Endurance category with Matt Greenwood, eventually winning the endurance category overall in the first race at Brands Hatch. In 2019, driving with Moh Ritson, Sarah returned in a Tockwith Motorsport G50, but it hasn't been a great season for them. In round six at Snetterton, Moore was needed in the final round of the WSeries at Brands Hatch, so brother Ed took over driving duties, but mechanical issues hindered his return to Britcar for the rest of the weekend.

== Personal life ==
Moore's brothers David, Nigel and Edward are all racing drivers. Her father, Simon, runs the Tockwith Motorsports team, and owns Tockwith Motorsports Centre, which was founded by her grandfather Reg. She stated in 2010 that she wanted to become Britain's first female Formula One driver, despite Divina Galica having already contested Formula One events 34 years prior.

Moore is lesbian and is married to Carlajane Metcalfe. She is a Driver Ambassador for Racing Pride, an LGBT rights charity.

== Racing record ==
=== Career summary ===
Season	Series	Position	Team	Car
2007	Ginetta Junior Championship	26th	Tockwith Motorsport	Ginetta G20
2008	Ginetta Junior Championship	17th	Tockwith Motorsport	Ginetta G20
2009	Ginetta Junior Championship	**1st**	Tockwith Motorsport	Ginetta G20
2010	Ginetta Junior Championship	7th	Tockwith Motorsport	Ginetta G40
2011	InterSteps Championship	6th	TMS Atlantic	Mygale–BMW FB02
2014	VLN Series – Toyota 86 Cup	**2nd**	Tockwith Motorsport; Vantage Motorsports	Toyota 86 Mk.1
2017	British LMP3 Cup	6th	Tockwith Motorsport	Ligier JS P3
2017	Mini Challenge UK	NE	Tockwith Motorsport	Mini Cooper F56
2017	Britcar Endurance Series – S5	**1st**	Tockwith Motorsport	Ginetta G50
2018	Britcar Endurance Series – E4	**1st**	Tockwith Motorsport	Ginetta G50
2019	Britcar Endurance Series – E4	7th	Tockwith Motorsport	Ginetta G50
2019	W Series	8th	Hitech Grand Prix	Tatuus–Alfa Romeo F3 T-318
2020	Porsche Sprint Challenge Great Britain	NE	IN2 Racing	Porsche Cayman 718 GT4 Clubsport
2021	W Series	5th	Scuderia W	Tatuus–Alfa Romeo F3 T-318
2022	W Series	11th	Scuderia W	Tatuus–Alfa Romeo F3 T-318; Tatuus–Toyota FT-60
2023	Indian Racing League	4th	Bangalore Speedsters	Wolf-Aprilia GB08 "Thunder"

=== Complete Ginetta Junior Championship results ===
(key) (Races in bold indicate pole position – 1 point awarded just in first race; races in italics indicate fastest lap – 1 point awarded all races;-

Year	Team	1	2	3	4	5	6	7	8	9	10	11	12	13	14	15	16	17	18	19	20	21	22	23	24	DC	Points
2007	Tockwith Motorsport	ANG; 1	ANG; 2	SIL; 1	SIL; 2	DON; 1	DON; 2	CRO; 1	CRO; 2	PEM; 1	PEM; 2	BHI; 1	BHI; 2	BHI; 3	BHI; 1; 15	BHI; 2; 16	BHI; 3; 18									26th	11
2008	Tockwith Motorsport	BHI; 1; 14	BHI; 2; 20	CAD; 1; 14	CAD; 2; 15	ROC; 1; 18	ROC; 2; 16	DON; 1; 15	DON; 2; 14	THR; 1 Ret	THR; 2; 13	CRO; 1; 15	CRO; 2; 9	SNE; 1; 12	SNE; 2; 9	OUL; 1; 10	OUL; 2; 17	KNO; 1 Ret	KNO; 2 Ret	SIL; 1; 6	SIL; 2; 18	MAL; 1; 9	MAL; 2; 10	BHI; 1 Ret	BHI; 2; 15	17th	154
2009	Tockwith Motorsport	BHI; 1; 9	BHI; 2; 4	THR; 1; 1	THR; 2; 1	DON; 1; 1	DON; 2; 3	OUL; 1; 3	OUL; 2; 3	CRO; 1; 6	CRO; 2; 17	SNE; 1; 4	SNE; 2; 5	KNO; 1 Ret	KNO; 2; 2	SIL; 1; 4	SIL; 2; 1	ROC; 1; 4	ROC; 2; 1	BHGP; 1; 12	BHGP; 2; 2					1st	458
2010	Eurotech Racing	BHGP; 1; 11	BHGP; 2; 6	THR; 1; 13	THR; 2; 11	BHGP; 1 Ret	BHGP; 2; 11	OUL; 1; 4	OUL; 2; 6	CRO; 1; 7	CRO; 2; 12	SNE; 1; 4	SNE; 2; 10	SIL; 1; 7	SIL; 2; 11	KNO; 1; 14	KNO; 2; 15	DON; 1; 2	DON; 2; 4	BHI; 1; 3	BHI; 2; 3					7th	297

=== Complete Britcar Endurance Championship results ===
(key) (Races in bold indicate pole position in class – 1 point awarded in race one) (Races in italics indicate fastest lap in class – 1 point awarded in all races)

Year	Team	Car	Class	1	2	3	4	5	6	7	8	9	10	11	12	13	14	15	16	DC	CP	Points
2017	S2Smarts	Smart Forfour	S5	SIL; 1	SIL; 2	SNE; 1	SNE; 2	SIL; 1	SIL; 2	BRH; 1	BRH; 2	DON; 1	DON; 2	**OUL**; **1**; 16	OUL; 2; 9	**SIL**; 8	BRH; 1 NC	BRH; 2; 8		4th	1st	233
2018	Tockwith Motorsport	Ginetta G50	E4	ROC; 1; 12	ROC; 2; 9	**SIL**; **1**; 12	SIL; 2; 5	OUL; 1 Ret	OUL; 2; 3	**DON**; **1**; 17	DON; 2; 7	**SNE**; **1**; 6	SNE; 2; 4	SIL; 1; 18	SIL; 2; 17	BRH; 1; 15	BRH; 2 DNS			1st	1st	341
2019	Tockwith Motorsport	Ginetta G50	4	SIL; 1; 25	SIL; 2; 16	SIL; 1; 18	SIL; 2; 12	BRH; 1 NC	BRH; 2; 11	DON; 1; 12	DON; 2; 11	OUL; 1 Ret	OUL; 2 Ret	SNE; 1	SNE; 2	OUL; 1	OUL; 2	BRH; 1	BRH; 2	24th	7th	90

=== Complete W Series results ===
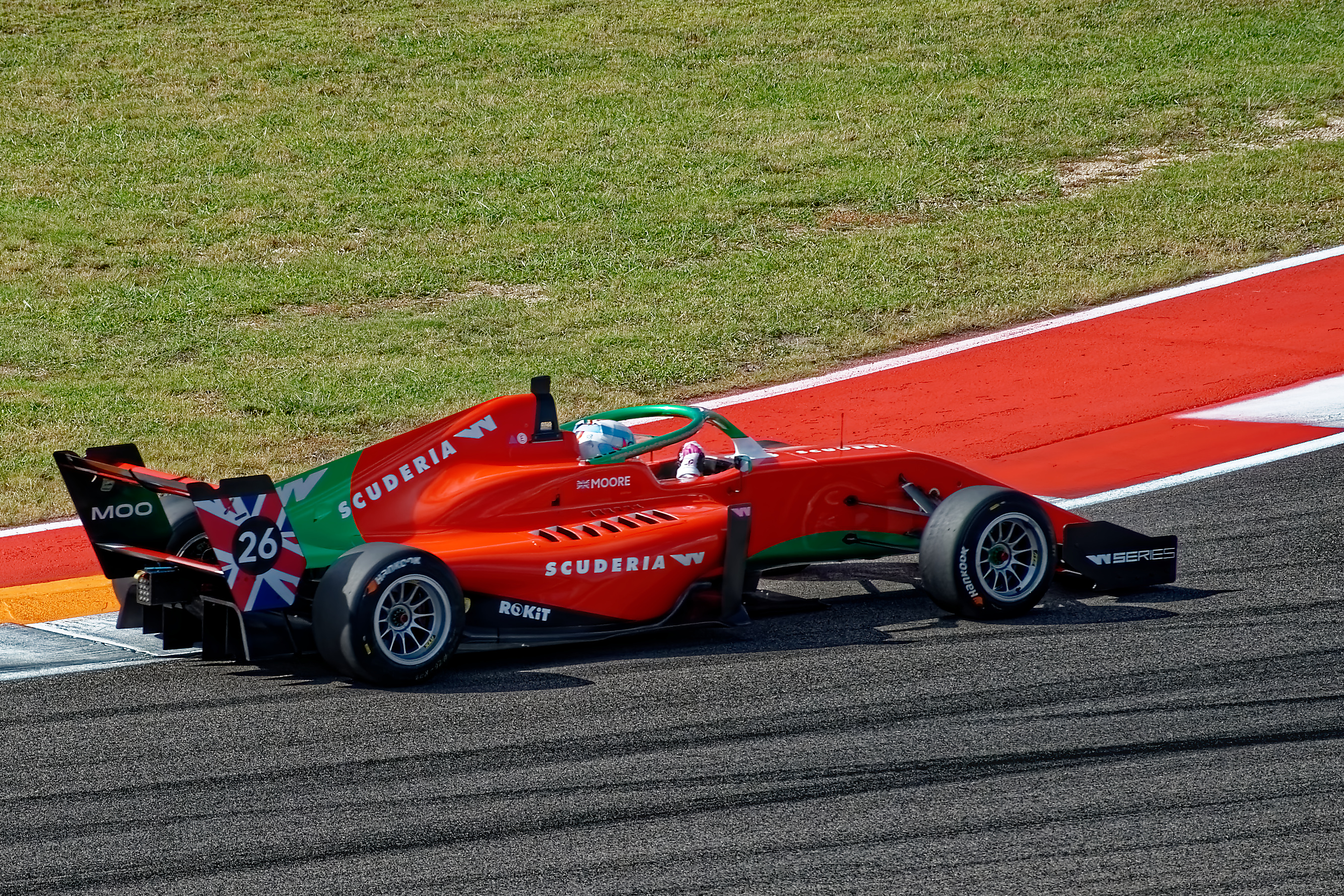
Moore competing in W Series in Austin, Texas in October of 2021.

(key) (Races in bold indicate pole position) (Races in italics indicate fastest lap)

Year	Team	1	2	3	4	5	6	7	8	DC	Points
2019	Hitech GP	HOC; 5	ZOL; 5	MIS; 9	NOR; Ret	ASS; 10	BRH; 10			8th	24
2021	Scuderia W	RBR1; 2	RBR2; 4	SIL; 7	HUN; 15	SPA; 13	ZAN; 9	COA1; 7	COA2; 4	5th	56
2022	Scuderia W	MIA1; 8	MIA2; 8	CAT; 10	SIL; 10	LEC; 8	HUN; 7	SGP; 7		11th	26

=== Complete Indian Racing League results ===
(key) (Races in bold indicate pole position) (Races in italics indicate fastest lap)

Year	Franchise	1	2	3	4	5	6	Pos.	Pts
2023‡	Bangalore Speedsters	IRU1; 1	IRU1; 2; 1	IRU2; 1	IRU2; 2; 4	IRU3; 1; 7	IRU3; 2	4th	78

‡ Standings based on entry points, not individual drivers.

Sporting positions
Preceded by Dino Zamparelli	Ginetta Junior Championship; Champion; 2009	Succeeded by Tom Ingram
Preceded by Witt Gamski; Ross Wylie	Britcar Endurance; Champion; 2018; With: Matt Greenwood	Succeeded by Paul Bailey; Andy Schulz
Awards and achievements
Preceded by Adam Christodoulou	Autosport Awards; British Club Driver of the Year; 2009	Succeeded by Tom Blomqvist
