= 2010 Ginetta Junior Championship =

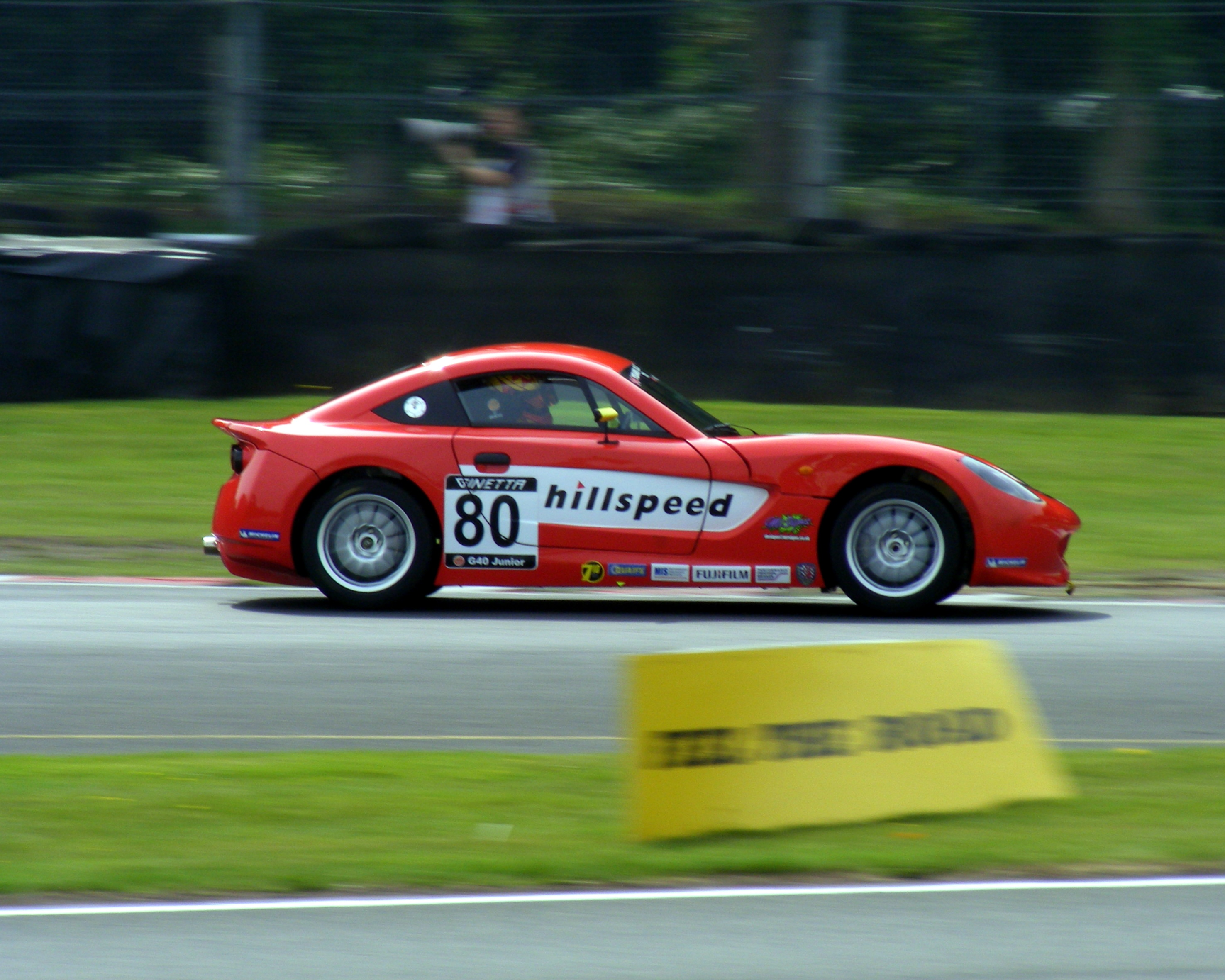
2010 champion Tom Ingram at Oulton Park

The 2010 Ginetta Junior Championship season was the eighth season of the Ginetta Junior Championship. The season began at Thruxton on 3 April 2010 and concluded after 20 races over 10 events at Brands Hatch on 10 October 2010. The championship introduced the G40 model to replace the G20 for the 2010 season.

Hillspeed's Tom Ingram became champion after a strong run towards the end of the season which included weekend sweeps at Silverstone and Knockhill, as well as a season-opening victory at Thruxton. Ingram's success, which included eight other podium finishes to go with his five wins, came despite having one of the smallest budgets of all the grid. Ingram's championship-winning margin was 65 points over Tollbar driver Jake Hill, who won ten races, but championship aspirations were thwarted by a disqualification at the Brands Hatch GP meeting, and accidents at Silverstone and Brands Hatch Indy. TJ Motorsport's Louise Richardson finished third with a pair of victories at Snetterton and Brands Hatch Indy, along with ten other podium finishes, including a run of eight successive podium finishes during the middle part of the season. Her team-mate Jody Fannin got the better of Tom Howard, who was a TJ driver until mid-season when he joined Hill at Tollbar, for fourth and fifth places; Fannin took victories at Brands Hatch GP and Croft, while Howard took the other victory at Rockingham. Defending champion Sarah Moore struggled for consistency in the season, but three end-of-season podiums enabled her to finish seventh in the championship behind brother David.

== Teams and drivers ==
Team	No.	Drivers	Rounds
Eurotech Racing	1	(United Kingdom) Sarah Moore	All
Eurotech Racing	77	(United Kingdom) David Moore	All
Team Parker Racing	3	(United Kingdom) Chris Swanwick	1–7
Team Parker Racing	4	(United Kingdom) Adam Bonham	All
Team Parker Racing	8	(United Kingdom) Finlay Ractliffe	All
Tollbar	5	(United Kingdom) Jake Hill	All
Tollbar	20	(United Kingdom) Tom Howard	6–10
FML	7	(United Kingdom) Jake Giddings	All
FML	51	(United Kingdom) Alex Austin	1–8, 10
HHC Motorsport	10	(United Kingdom) Carl Stirling	4
HHC Motorsport	79	(United Kingdom) Michael Day	10
HHC Motorsport	86	(United Kingdom) George Salter	10
TJ Motorsport	20	(United Kingdom) Tom Howard	1–5
TJ Motorsport	25	(United Kingdom) Louise Richardson	All
TJ Motorsport	27	(United Kingdom) Jody Fannin	All
Tranzpower	22	(Northern Ireland) Patrick McClughan	3–7, 9–10
Hillspeed	31	(United Kingdom) Seb Morris	All
Hillspeed	80	(United Kingdom) Tom Ingram	All
Piranha Motorsport	33	(United Kingdom) Ryan Ratcliffe	1–2, 4–10
Tockwith	41	(United Kingdom) William Foster	All
Tockwith	69	(Spain) Maverick Domene	All
Privateer	71	(United Kingdom) Max Coates	All
Brad Bailey Racing	84	(United Kingdom) Brad Bailey	All

== Calendar ==
All rounds were held in the United Kingdom. The series supported the British Touring Car Championship at all rounds.

Round		Circuit	Date	Pole position	Fastest lap	Winning driver	Winning team
1	R1	Thruxton Circuit, Hampshire	3 April	(United Kingdom) Jake Hill	(United Kingdom) Jody Fannin	(United Kingdom) Tom Ingram	Hillspeed
1	R2	Thruxton Circuit, Hampshire	4 April	(United Kingdom) Jake Hill	(United Kingdom) Jake Hill	(United Kingdom) Jake Hill	Tollbar
2	R3	Rockingham Motor Speedway, Northamptonshire	24 April	(United Kingdom) Jake Hill	(United Kingdom) Jake Hill	(United Kingdom) Tom Howard	TJ Motorsport
2	R4	Rockingham Motor Speedway, Northamptonshire	25 April	(United Kingdom) Jake Hill	(United Kingdom) Tom Ingram	(United Kingdom) Jake Hill	Tollbar
3	R5	Brands Hatch (GP), Kent	1 May	(United Kingdom) Jake Hill	(United Kingdom) Tom Ingram	(United Kingdom) Jody Fannin	TJ Motorsport
3	R6	Brands Hatch (GP), Kent	2 May	(United Kingdom) Jake Hill	(United Kingdom) Jake Hill	(United Kingdom) Jake Hill	Tollbar
4	R7	Oulton Park, Cheshire	5 June	(United Kingdom) Louise Richardson	(United Kingdom) Jody Fannin	(United Kingdom) Jody Fannin	TJ Motorsport
4	R8	Oulton Park, Cheshire	6 June	(United Kingdom) Jody Fannin	(United Kingdom) Jake Hill	(United Kingdom) Jake Hill	Tollbar
5	R9	Croft Circuit, North Yorkshire	19 June	(United Kingdom) Jake Hill	(United Kingdom) Jake Hill	(United Kingdom) Jake Hill	Tollbar
5	R10	Croft Circuit, North Yorkshire	20 June	(United Kingdom) Jake Hill	(United Kingdom) Jake Hill	(United Kingdom) Jake Hill	Tollbar
6	R11	Snetterton Motor Racing Circuit, Norfolk	8 August	(United Kingdom) Louise Richardson	(United Kingdom) Tom Ingram	(United Kingdom) Louise Richardson	TJ Motorsport
6	R12	Snetterton Motor Racing Circuit, Norfolk	8 August	(United Kingdom) Chris Swanwick	(United Kingdom) Tom Ingram	(United Kingdom) Jake Hill	Tollbar
7	R13	Silverstone Circuit, Northamptonshire	21 August	(United Kingdom) Tom Ingram	(United Kingdom) Tom Ingram	(United Kingdom) Tom Ingram	Hillspeed
7	R14	Silverstone Circuit, Northamptonshire	22 August	(United Kingdom) Tom Ingram	(United Kingdom) Tom Ingram	(United Kingdom) Tom Ingram	Hillspeed
8	R15	Knockhill Racing Circuit, Fife	4 September	(United Kingdom) Tom Ingram	(United Kingdom) Tom Ingram	(United Kingdom) Tom Ingram	Hillspeed
8	R16	Knockhill Racing Circuit, Fife	5 September	(United Kingdom) Tom Ingram	(United Kingdom) Tom Ingram	(United Kingdom) Tom Ingram	Hillspeed
9	R17	Donington Park, Leicestershire	19 September	(United Kingdom) Tom Ingram	(United Kingdom) Adam Bonham	(United Kingdom) Jake Hill	Tollbar
9	R18	Donington Park, Leicestershire	19 September	(United Kingdom) Tom Ingram	(United Kingdom) Jake Hill	(United Kingdom) Jake Hill	Tollbar
10	R19	Brands Hatch (Indy), Kent	9 October	(United Kingdom) Louise Richardson	(United Kingdom) Jake Hill	(United Kingdom) Louise Richardson	TJ Motorsport
10	R20	Brands Hatch (Indy), Kent	10 October	(United Kingdom) Louise Richardson	(United Kingdom) Jake Hill	(United Kingdom) Jake Hill	Tollbar

== Standings ==
Pos	Driver	THR		ROC		BHGP		OUL		CRO		SNE		SIL		KNO		DON		BHI		Pen	Pts
1	(United Kingdom) Tom Ingram	1	5	4	4	3	2	12	4	3	2	3	4	1	1	1	1	4	2	2	2		556
2	(United Kingdom) Jake Hill	5	1	10	1	DSQ	1	6	1	1	1	12	1	3	Ret	2	2	1	1	Ret	1	20	491
3	(United Kingdom) Louise Richardson	4	4	2	3	Ret	5	2	3	2	3	1	3	2	3	11	3	7	8	1	Ret		454
4	(United Kingdom) Jody Fannin	9	9	9	5	1	Ret	1	2	5	5	2	6	Ret	6	8	11	8	12	5	5		352
5	(United Kingdom) Tom Howard	8	8	1	6	2	Ret	3	5	6	6	8	7	15	8	3	5	5	7	8	7	15	340
6	(United Kingdom) David Moore	3	3	3	13	4	3	5	7	10	8	7	8	Ret	DNS	5	12	3	5	12	4	10	321
7	(United Kingdom) Sarah Moore	11	6	13	11	Ret	11	4	6	7	12	4	10	7	11	14	15	2	4	3	3		297
8	(United Kingdom) Alex Austin	7	2	5	2	Ret	9	8	Ret	4	4	5	5	6	Ret	10	8			4	Ret	15	256
9	(Spain) Maverick Domene	10	13	15	14	Ret	7	7	16	18	11	9	9	4	9	7	4	13	14	Ret	9		205
10	(United Kingdom) Adam Bonham	6	10	7	10	9	6	10	12	8	10	Ret	15	10	2	6	DSQ	6	Ret	11	Ret	30	195
11	(United Kingdom) Max Coates	18	17	14	12	8	8	9	9	11	14	13	16	11	7	15	7	9	11	10	6	10	194
12	(United Kingdom) Seb Morris	12	14	11	8	Ret	Ret	14	11	12	17	6	Ret	13	Ret	4	9	10	3	6	11	10	185
13	(United Kingdom) Jake Giddings	15	11	6	9	6	10	16	8	15	7	14	12	9	12	9	14	Ret	Ret	9	15	15	175
14	(United Kingdom) Chris Swanwick	2	7	8	7	5	4	11	18	9	9	10	2	5	DSQ							55	162
15	(United Kingdom) Brad Bailey	17	15	17	17	10	13	19	15	17	15	11	13	17	10	13	10	11	Ret	13	10		136
16	(United Kingdom) William Foster	13	16	16	16	7	Ret	13	17	14	Ret	Ret	11	12	Ret	16	13	14	10	7	13		132
17	(United Kingdom) Ryan Ratcliffe	16	12	12	15			17	14	Ret	16	17	Ret	8	4	12	6	12	13	Ret	DNS		129
18	(United Kingdom) Finlay Ractliffe	14	18	18	18	Ret	Ret	Ret	Ret	13	13	16	17	16	5	17	16	Ret	6	14	Ret	10	90
19	(Northern Ireland) Patrick McClughan					Ret	12	18	13	16	Ret	15	14	14	13			Ret	9	15	8		85
20	(United Kingdom) Carl Stirling							15	10														17
21	(United Kingdom) Michael Day																			17	12		13
22	(United Kingdom) George Salter																			16	14		12
Pos	Driver	THR		ROC		BHGP		OUL		CRO		SNE		SIL		KNO		DON		BHI		Pen	Pts

Colour	Result
Gold	Winner
Silver	Second place
Bronze	Third place
Green	Points classification
Blue	Non-points classification
Blue	Non-classified finish (NC)
Purple	Retired, not classified (Ret)
Red	Did not qualify (DNQ)
Red	Did not pre-qualify (DNPQ)
Black	Disqualified (DSQ)
White	Did not start (DNS)
White	Withdrew (WD)
White	Race cancelled (C)
Blank	Did not practice (DNP)
Blank	Did not arrive (DNA)
Blank	Excluded (EX)

== Ginetta Junior Winter Series ==
The 2010 Ginetta Junior Winter Series was the third Ginetta Junior Winter Series. The series was held over four rounds at Pembrey on the weekend of 13–14 November. It formed part of the British Automobile Racing Club Winter Series. The series was won by Hillspeed's Seb Morris, who took two wins. Second place went to privateer Max Coates, who took one win and third place went to Tockwith driver David Moore. Adam Bonham of Team Parker Racing took the other race victory.

=== Teams and drivers ===
All teams and driver were British-registered.

2010 Winter Series Entry List
Team	No	Driver
Team Parker Racing	4	Adam Bonham
Team Parker Racing	8	Finlay Ractliffe
Tockwith	6	David Moore
Tockwith	95	Myles Collins
FML	7	Jake Giddings
HHC Motorsport	9	George Gamble
HHC Motorsport	79	Michael Day
Hillspeed	31	Seb Morris
Piranha Motorsport	33	Ryan Ratcliffe
JT Motorsport	40	Sennan Fielding
Privateer	71	Max Coates

=== Calendar ===
Round	Circuit	Date	Pole position	Fastest lap	Winning driver	Winning team
R1	Pembrey, Carmarthenshire	13 November	David Moore	Seb Morris	Seb Morris	Hillspeed
R2	Pembrey, Carmarthenshire	13 November	David Moore	Seb Morris	Max Coates	Privateer
R3	Pembrey, Carmarthenshire	14 November	Adam Bonham	Adam Bonham	Adam Bonham	Team Parker Racing
R4	Pembrey, Carmarthenshire	14 November	Adam Bonham	Seb Morris	Seb Morris	Hillspeed
