= Aaron Williamson =

British racing driver (born 1992)

- Nationality: (United Kingdom) British
- Born: 4 June 1992 (age 34) Peterborough, Cambridgeshire, UK

British Touring Car Championship career
- Debut season: 2012
- Current team: Team HARD.
- Car number: 27
- Starts: 2
- Wins: 0
- Poles: 0
- Fastest laps: 0

Previous series
- 2012–2013 2012 2010 2010–2011 2008–2009 2006–2008: Renault Clio Cup United Kingdom; British Touring Car Championship; Britcar 24hr Ginetta GT4 Supercup; Ginetta Junior Championship; SAXMAX Saloon Car Championship

Aaron Williamson (born 4 June 1992) is a British racing driver who competed in the British Touring Car Championship in 2012. He later returned to the Renault Clio Cup United Kingdom in 2013.

== Racing career ==
Williamson began his career in the SAXMAX Saloon Car Championship in 2006. He switched to the Ginetta Junior Championship for 2008, taking several top-ten finishes on his way to finishing thirteenth overall, with 189 points. He joined Muzz Racing for the 2009 Ginetta Junior Championship season, ending the season third in the standings with three victories. Williamson went on to race for Century Motorsport in the 2010 Ginetta G50 Cup season, after the first three rounds, he switched to FML from round six onwards. He ended the season eleventh in the championship standings. He stayed with FML for the 2011 Ginetta GT Supercup season, where he ended second in the G50 Cup class standings. In September 2012, it was announced that Williamson would make his British Touring Car Championship debut with Team HARD. replacing Howard Fuller He finished 14th in the first race, before retiring from race two and not starting race three.

== Racing record ==
=== Complete British Touring Car Championship results ===
(key) (Races in bold indicate pole position – 1 point awarded just in first race; races in italics indicate fastest lap – 1 point awarded all races; * signifies that driver led race for at least one lap – 1 point given all races)

Year	Team	Car	1	2	3	4	5	6	7	8	9	10	11	12	13	14	15	16	17	18	19	20	21	22	23	24	25	26	27	28	29	30	DC	Pts
2012	Team HARD.	Honda Civic	BRH; 1	BRH; 2	BRH; 3	DON; 1	DON; 2	DON; 3	THR; 1	THR; 2	THR; 3	OUL; 1	OUL; 2	OUL; 3	CRO; 1	CRO; 2	CRO; 3	SNE; 1	SNE; 2	SNE; 3	KNO; 1	KNO; 2	KNO; 3	ROC; 1	ROC; 2	ROC; 3	SIL; 1	SIL; 2	SIL; 3	BRH; 1; 14	BRH; 2 Ret	BRH; 3 DNS	27th	2

== 24 Hours of Silverstone results ==
Year	Team	Co-Drivers	Car	Car No.	Class	Laps	Pos.	Class Pos.
2010	(United Kingdom) Strategic Racing / John Welch Motorsport	(Australia) Mark Pilatti (United Kingdom) Adam Christodoulou (United Kingdom) Luke Wright (United Kingdom) Carl Breeze	SEAT Leon Supercopa	45	3	523	10th	6th

Sporting positions
Preceded by Josh Hill	Ginetta Junior Winter Series; Champion; 2009	Succeeded by Seb Morris
