= Dagfa House School =

Dagfa School Nottingham Formerly Dorothy Grants High School for Girls

Location
- 57 Broadgate; Beeston; Nottingham, Nottinghamshire, NG9 2FU; England; 52.93231°N 1.20783°W

Information
- Type: Other independent school
- Department for Education URN: 122911 Tables
- Head teacher: Dr. Woodroffe
- Gender: Co-educational
- Age: 2 to 16
- Enrolment: 237 (January 2012)
- Colour: Navy
- Website: Dagfaschool

Dagfa School Nottingham was an independent, co-educational school in Beeston, Nottinghamshire, England, which included Dagfa Nursery, Dagfa Junior School and Dagfa Senior School.

== Facilities ==
The Dagfa school opened in 1948 in a converted 18th-century family home, a listed building. In 1969, it became the Dagfa House School, a fully independent day school. In 2010, it became the Dagfa School Nottingham.

By July 2016, Dagfa School Nottingham comprised Woodlands (a second large house), a multi-purpose gym hall, a library as well as a third building housing sciences, Information and communications technology, and a modern studio theatre. Girls and boys between ages 2 and 16 were taught.

== Closure ==
On 27 May 2016, the school announced to staff and parents that it would close at the end of the summer term. On 15 July 2016, Dagfa School Nottingham closed, apart from the nursery, which closed in August. The school trustees put the school into administration on 20 July 2016.
