= Team Pyro =

British auto racing team

(United Kingdom) Team Pyro
- Founded: 2003
- Current series: Renault UK Clio Cup; ADAC TCR Germany Touring Car Championship (in partnership with Target Competition)
- Former series: Blancpain Endurance Series; British GT Championship

Team Pyro was a British auto racing team that competed in the Renault Clio Cup United Kingdom and ADAC TCR Germany Touring Car Championship in partnership with Target Competition. The team competed in numerous series, including the Blancpain Endurance Series, British GT Championship, Renault Clio Eurocup, and Renault Clio Cup Italia, among others. The team previously worked with notable British racing drivers, such as Andrew Jordan, Jeff Smith, Ashley Sutton, and Josh Files, among others.

== Renault Clio Cup ==
=== Clio Cup UK ===
The team entered the Renault Clio Cup UK for the 2007 season with a three-car effort. The main two cars were driven by Chris Law and Mel Healey, while a third car was entered in conjunction with Eurotech Racing for Andrew Jordan. Jordan finished 12th in the season while Law and Healy were 27th and 29th respectively. Law also entered the Winter Cup during the same year along with Joe Hopkins.

In 2008 the team expanded to 4 full-time cars, initially entering Ben Winrow, Chris Rice, Chris Law, and Jeff Smith. During the season Neil Waterworth replaced Smith at Croft, while Alex Dew replaced law at Oulton Park and Silverstone before replacing Winrow, who had already secured the drivers' championship, at Brands Hatch. Aside from Winrow's title win, the others finished outside the Top 10 – Alex Dew finished 12th, but most of the points were won while being part of Solutions Racing, Chris Rice was 23rd, Chris Law finished 30th and Jeff Smith finished 33rd. In the Winter Cup, the team entered two cars for Árón Smith and Quentin Smith with Árón winning the title.

For 2009 the team initially entered five cars for Jeff Smith, Phil Glew, Árón Smith, Daniel Lloyd, and Alex Dew. Midway through the season, Lloyd left the team to join Total Control Racing. Series champion Ben Winrow returned to the team at Silverstone GP and Chris Rice made a one-off appearance at Brands Hatch GP replacing Dew. In the overall standings, Phil Glew took the drivers' title, while Árón Smith was 4th. The team also took the entrants' championship ahead of Total Control Racing. In the Winter Cup, the team fielded a single car for James Colburn, who finished 6th in the standings.

Jeff Smith remained with the team in 2010 and was joined by Dave Newsham, Jack Goff and David Dickenson. Jake Packun also made appearances with the team. The team retained both titles with Newsham crowned as the drivers' champion. Smith and Goff finished 8th and 9th respectively.

Goff stayed with the team for the 2011 season after Newsham and Smith got promoted to the BTCC. Áron Smith returned with the team, while Chris Swanwick, Adam Bonham, Craig Currie, and Josh Files completed the 6-car lineup for the season. Midway through the season, Swanwick was replaced by Neb Bursac at Snetterton and David Dickenson at Rockingham and Brands Hatch. Craig Currie didn't enter the final round of the season at Brands Hatch. The season ended with Árón Smith finishing second behind Paul Rivett. The results of the other drivers were Goff 5th, Files 7th, Bonham 8th, Curie 12th, Swanwick 16th.

== ADAC TCR Germany Touring Car Championship ==
The team competed in the ADAC TCR Germany Touring Car Championship with the support of Target Competition. The team mainly operates the car, driven by Josh Files, who has won the driver's title 2 times. Team Pyro also won the teams' championship as Target Competition UK-SUI. The team competed under its own name in 2019, before withdrawing from the championship at the end of the year.
