= Ginetta Junior Championship =

British automobile racing series

- Category: One-make racing by Ginetta
- Country: United Kingdom
- Affiliations: SRO Motorsports Group
- Inaugural season: 2005
- Constructors: Ginetta
- Engine suppliers: Ford Zetec
- Tyre suppliers: Pirelli
- Drivers' champion: (Netherlands) Rocco Coronel
- Teams' champion: (United Kingdom) R Racing
- Official website: www.ginetta.com/championships/junior-championship/

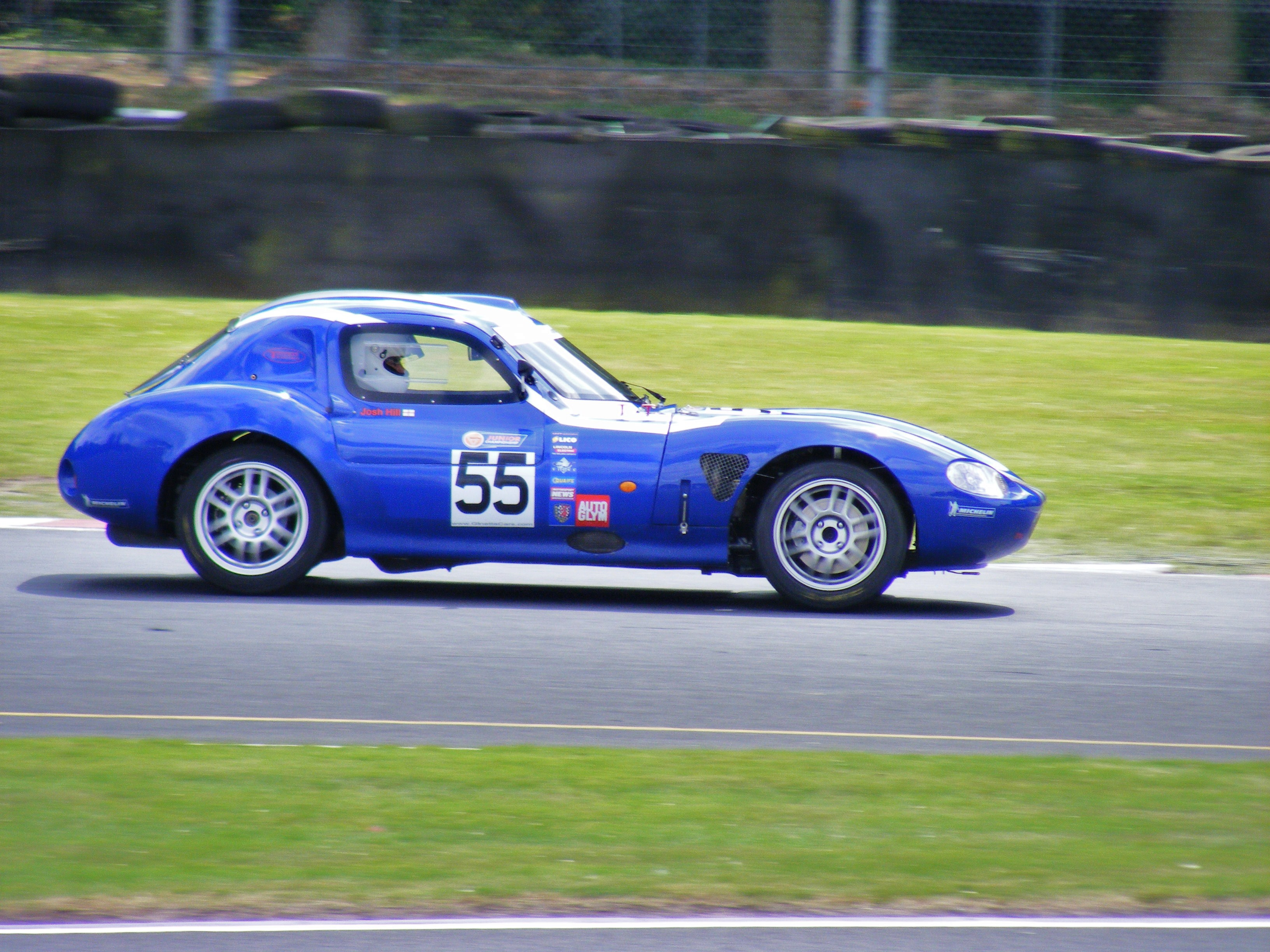
The previous Ginetta Junior car, the G20.

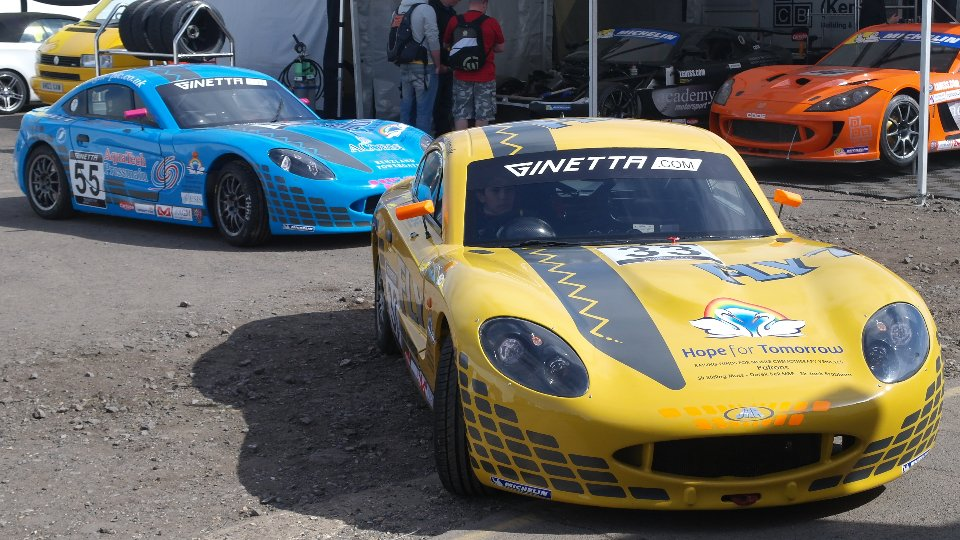
Ginetta G40 racing cars of Ollie and Jamie Chadwick at Thruxton, Hampshire.

The Ginetta Junior Championship is a British one-make junior motor racing championship organised around Ginetta sports cars. It is designed as an entry-level car racing series for young drivers moving from karting into circuit racing, with eligibility centred on drivers aged 14 to 17. From the 2010 season, the championship has used the Ginetta G40, having previously used the Ginetta G20. In 2026, SRO Motorsports Group took over operational management of the series.

The championship has acted as a development category for drivers who later progressed into touring cars, GT racing, single-seaters and international motorsport. Alumni include Lando Norris, Tom Ingram, Jamie Chadwick, Tom Gamble, Dan Harper, Luke Browning and Freddie Slater.

== Race format ==
The championship is a one-make series, with drivers competing in Ginetta-built junior racing cars. Race meetings usually consist of multiple races across a race weekend. The 2025 sporting regulations state that each driver's fastest qualifying lap determines the grid for race one, while the second-fastest qualifying lap determines the grid for race two. Where a third race is scheduled, the grid is formed from the finishing order of race two.

== Cars ==
The championship originally used the Ginetta G20, before switching to the Ginetta G40 from the 2010 season. The G40 Junior uses a sealed 1.8-litre Ford Zetec engine, a sealed Quaife six-speed sequential gearbox, a T45 tubular chassis and integral safety cage built to FIA standards, and controlled Pirelli road tyres.

== History ==
The championship began in 2005 and became one of Ginetta's main junior racing categories in the United Kingdom. The series initially used the Ginetta G20 before the Ginetta G40 was introduced for the 2010 season. Over time, the championship became established as a pathway for drivers graduating from karting into circuit racing.

The 2025 season was the championship's 20th anniversary season, during which the series reached its 500th race.

In 2026, operational management of the championship moved to SRO Motorsports Group, as part of a wider change to Ginetta's UK one-make racing structure.

== Scholarship ==
The Ginetta Junior Scholarship is an annual selection process associated with the championship. The competition assesses young drivers across areas including on-track driving, media and communication skills, and fitness. The winner receives support towards a season in the Ginetta Junior Championship, including championship entry, use of a G40 Junior Evo, insurance, tyres, fuel and professional car preparation.

== Development pathway and racing families ==
The Ginetta Junior Championship has been used as an early car-racing category by drivers who later progressed into single-seaters, touring cars, GT racing, endurance racing and international motorsport. Ginetta has highlighted the series as part of the early careers of drivers including Lando Norris, Tom Ingram, Jamie Chadwick, Tom Gamble, Luke Browning, Freddie Slater and Abbi Pulling.

The championship has also featured drivers from established motorsport families. Ginetta reported in 2026 that descendants of three Formula One world champions had competed in the series: Henry Surtees, son of John Surtees; Josh Hill, son of Damon Hill and grandson of Graham Hill; and Enzo Fittipaldi, grandson of Emerson Fittipaldi.

Other drivers whose family backgrounds were noted by Ginetta include Will Palmer, son of former Formula One driver Jonathan Palmer; Sebastian Priaulx, son of touring car champion Andy Priaulx; Louis Foster, son of former British Touring Car Championship driver Nick Foster; and Rocco Coronel, son of touring car driver Tom Coronel and racing driver Paulien Zwart.

== Champions ==
Season	Drivers' champion	Champion's team	Winter Series winner	Scholarship winner
2005	(United Kingdom) Toby Newton			
2006	(United Kingdom) James Harrison			
2007	(United Kingdom) Nigel Moore	Hepworth International	(United Kingdom) Kieran Vernon	
2008	(United Kingdom) Dino Zamparelli	Muzz Racing	(United Kingdom) Josh Hill	
2009	(United Kingdom) Sarah Moore	Tockwith Motorsport	(United Kingdom) Aaron Williamson	
2010	(United Kingdom) Tom Ingram	Hillspeed	(United Kingdom) Seb Morris	
2011	(United Kingdom) Seb Morris	Hillspeed	(United Kingdom) George Gamble	(United Kingdom) Sennan Fielding
2012	(United Kingdom) Charlie Robertson	HHC Motorsport	(United Kingdom) Harry Woodhead	(United Kingdom) Oli Basey-Fisher
2013	(United Kingdom) Harry Woodhead	HHC Motorsport	(United Kingdom) James Kellett	(United Kingdom) Jamie Chadwick
2014	(United Kingdom) Jack Mitchell	JHR Developments	(United Kingdom) Jamie Caroline	(United Kingdom) Alex Sedgwick
2015	(United Kingdom) Jamie Caroline	HHC Motorsport	(United Kingdom) Stuart Middleton	(United Kingdom) Stuart Middleton
2016	(United Kingdom) Will Tregurtha	HHC Motorsport	(United Kingdom) Sebastian Priaulx	(United Kingdom) Daniel Harper
2017	(United Kingdom) Tom Gamble	JHR Developments / Elite Motorsport	(United Kingdom) Adam Smalley	(United Kingdom) Adam Smalley
2018	(United Kingdom) Adam Smalley	Elite Motorsport	(United Kingdom) James Hedley	(United Kingdom) James Taylor
2019	(United Kingdom) James Hedley	Elite Motorsport	(United Kingdom) James Taylor	(United Kingdom) Ethan Brooks
2020	(United Kingdom) Tom Lebbon	Elite Motorsport	Cancelled	(United Kingdom) Tom Lebbon
2021	(United Kingdom) Aston Millar	R Racing	(United Kingdom) Josh Rowledge	(United Kingdom) Maurice Henry (Netherlands) Robert de Haan
2022	(United Kingdom) Josh Rowledge	R Racing	(United Kingdom) Freddie Slater	(United Kingdom) Alisha Palmowski
2023	(United Kingdom) Freddie Slater	R Racing	(United Kingdom) Jude Peters	
2024	(United Kingdom) Ethan Jeff-Hall	R Racing	(United Kingdom) Isaac Phelps	(United Kingdom) Fred Green
2025	(Netherlands) Rocco Coronel	R Racing	(United Kingdom) Jesse Phillips	(Netherlands) Devon Hagelen

== Notable alumni ==
The following drivers competed in the Ginetta Junior Championship and later achieved notable results in national or international motor racing. The series has been described by Ginetta and motorsport publications as an early development category for drivers who later progressed into Formula One, IndyCar, touring cars, GT racing and endurance racing.

Year	Driver	Ginetta Junior result	Later notable achievements
2008	(United Kingdom) Dino Zamparelli	Champion	Three-time Porsche Carrera Cup GB runner-up
2010	(United Kingdom) Tom Ingram	Champion	2022 and 2025 British Touring Car Championship champion
2010	(United Kingdom) Jake Hill	Runner-up	2024 British Touring Car Championship champion
2011	(United Kingdom) Seb Morris	Champion	2017 British GT3 champion
2011	(United Kingdom) Sennan Fielding	Scholarship-class winner	2022 British GT4 champion
2011	(United Kingdom) George Gamble	Winter Series champion	2024 Porsche Carrera Cup Great Britain champion
2012	(United Kingdom) Charlie Robertson	Champion	2015 ELMS LMP3 champion
2013	(United Kingdom) Jamie Chadwick	Scholarship-class winner	2015 British GT4 champion; three-time W Series champion
2014	(United Kingdom) Jack Mitchell	Champion	2018 British GT4 champion
2014	(United Kingdom) Lando Norris	Rookie-class champion	2016 Autosport BRDC Award winner; 2025 Formula One World Champion
2016	(United Kingdom) Jamie Caroline	Champion	2017 British F4 and 2020 British GT4 champion
2016	(United Kingdom) Dan Harper	Rookie-class champion	2019 Porsche Carrera Cup Great Britain and 2023 British GT3 champion
2017	(United Kingdom) Tom Gamble	Champion	2018 Autosport BRDC Award winner; 2020 ELMS LMP3 champion
2017	(United Kingdom) Sebastian Priaulx	Runner-up	2019 British GT4 runner-up; 2021 Porsche Carrera Cup North America champion
2017	(United Kingdom) Kiern Jewiss	Rookie-class champion	2018 British F4 and 2022 Porsche Carrera Cup Great Britain champion
2018	(United Kingdom) Adam Smalley	Champion	2023 Porsche Carrera Cup Great Britain and 2024 British GT3 Silver-Am champion
2018	(United Kingdom) Louis Foster	Runner-up	2024 Indy NXT champion; 2025 IndyCar Series driver
2018	(United Kingdom) Luke Browning	Third place	2022 Autosport BRDC Award winner; 2022 GB3 champion; 2023 Macau Grand Prix winner
2018	(United Kingdom) Abbi Pulling	21st	2024 F1 Academy champion; first female winner in the F4 British Championship
2019	(United Kingdom) Zak O'Sullivan	Runner-up	2021 Autosport BRDC Award winner; 2021 GB3 champion
2020	(United Kingdom) Tom Lebbon	Champion	2024 GT4 European Series champion
2020	(United Kingdom) Josh Rattican	Runner-up	2024 GT4 European Series champion
2021	(Netherlands) Robert de Haan	Rookie-class champion	2023 Porsche Carrera Cup Benelux champion
2021	(United Kingdom) Callum Voisin	Sixth place	2023 GB3 Championship champion
2023	(United Kingdom) Freddie Slater	Champion	2024 Italian F4 champion; 2024 Euro 4 runner-up; 2025 FRECA champion

== See also ==
- Ginetta GT4 Supercup
