= 2015 Renault UK Clio Cup =

The 2015 Renault UK Clio Cup is a multi-event, one make motor racing championship held across England and one event in Scotland. The championship features a mix of professional motor racing teams and privately funded drivers competing in the Clio Renaultsport 200 Turbo EDC that conform to the technical regulations for the championship. It forms part of the extensive program of support categories built up around the BTCC. It will be the 20th Renault Clio Cup United Kingdom season and the 40th of UK motorsport undertaken by Renault and Renault Sport. The first race takes place on 5 April at Brands Hatch on the circuit's Indy configuration and concluded on 11 October at the same venue, utilising the Grand Prix circuit, after eighteen races held at nine meetings.

2014 champion Mike Bushell graduated to the BTCC for 2015 to drive for AmD Tuning.com, with vice-champion Josh Cook joining him at Power Maxed Racing – those two being amongst twelve Clio Cup graduates on the 2015 BTCC entry list.

== Teams and drivers ==
Team	No.	Drivers	Class	Rounds
Team Pyro	1	(United Kingdom) Ash Hand		All
Team Pyro	28	(United Kingdom) Josh Price	G	7–9
Team Pyro	38	(United Kingdom) Mark Howard	M	3–9
Team Pyro	39	(United Kingdom) Brett Smith	G	1–2, 4–5
Team BKR	2	(United Kingdom) James Colburn		3
Team BKR	76	(United Kingdom) Freddie Hunt		1–2
JamSport Racing	3	(United Kingdom) Dan Holland		1–6
JamSport Racing	8	(United Kingdom) Luke Kidsley		7–9
JamSport Racing	24	(United Kingdom) George Jackson	G	1–3
JamSport Racing	43	(United Arab Emirates) Tom Grundy	G	All
WDE Motorsport	3	(United Kingdom) Dan Holland		8–9
WDE Motorsport	22	(United Kingdom) Paul Rivett		All
WDE Motorsport	32	(United Kingdom) Charlie Ladell	G	6–9
WDE Motorsport	63	(United Kingdom) Rory Green	G	All
20Ten Racing	4	(United Kingdom) Peter Felix	M	5, 7
20Ten Racing	7	(United Kingdom) Sam Watkins	G	8–9
20Ten Racing	12	(United Kingdom) Ben Palmer		9
20Ten Racing	19	(United Kingdom) Jack Mitchell	G	6–7
20Ten Racing	38	(United Kingdom) Mark Howard	M	1–2
20Ten Racing	50	(United Kingdom) Graham Field	M	1–2, 4–5, 7–8
20Ten Racing	55	(United Kingdom) Tom Butler	G	8–9
20Ten Racing	92	(United Kingdom) Jordan Stilp		1–5
Team Cooksport	9	(United Kingdom) Alex Sedgwick	G	8–9
Team Cooksport	13	(United Kingdom) Rory Collingbourne	G	All
Team Cooksport	24	(United Kingdom) George Jackson	G	4–9
Team Cooksport	32	(United Kingdom) Charlie Ladell	G	1–5
Team Cooksport	42	(United Kingdom) Paul Knapp	M	1–2
Team Cooksport	72	(United Kingdom) Jon Maybin		3–4, 9
Maximum Motorsport	14	(United Kingdom) Tom Witts		8–9
Maximum Motorsport	10	(United Kingdom) Ant Whorton-Eales		6–9
SV Racing	10	(United Kingdom) Ant Whorton-Eales		
SV Racing	10	(United Kingdom) Ant Whorton-Eales		1–5
SV Racing	15	(United Kingdom) Paul Donkin		5
SV Racing	19	(United Kingdom) Jack Mitchell	G	1–5
SV Racing	35	(United Kingdom) Ben Seyfried	M	1–2
Team BMR Restart with Pyro	16	(United Kingdom) Ashley Sutton	G	All
Rangoni Corse	21	(United Kingdom) Ben Davis	G	8
Rangoni Corse	27	(Italy) Michele Puccetti	M	8
Paul Streather Motorsport with Finesse Motorsport	26	(United Kingdom) Paul Streather		9
Range Storage with Team Cooksport	29	(United Kingdom) Lee Pattison	M	6

Icon	Class
M	Masters Cup
G	Graduate Cup

== Race calendar and results ==
The provisional calendar was announced by the championship organisers on 27 November 2014. Silverstone Circuit returns to the calendar in 2015 at the expense of Snetterton Motor Racing Circuit.

Round		Circuit	Date	Pole position	Fastest lap	Winning driver	Winning team
1	R1	Brands Hatch (Indy Circuit, Kent)	4 April	Ashley Sutton	Race abandoned (Note: The race was stopped on the first lap after a multi-car accident, involving Dan Holland, Tom Grundy and Mark Howard. Due to other scheduled events that were to be held before the circuit's curfew, the race was postponed until the Donington Park meeting.)		
1	R2	Brands Hatch (Indy Circuit, Kent)	5 April	Ash Hand	Ash Hand	Ant Whorton-Eales	SV Racing
2	R1	Donington Park (National Circuit, Leicestershire)	18 April	Ashley Sutton	Ant Whorton-Eales	Ashley Sutton	Team BMR Restart with Pyro
2	R3	Donington Park (National Circuit, Leicestershire)	19 April	Ashley Sutton	Ant Whorton-Eales	Ash Hand	Team Pyro
2	R4	Donington Park (National Circuit, Leicestershire)	19 April	Ant Whorton-Eales	Ant Whorton-Eales	Ant Whorton-Eales	SV Racing
3	R5	Thruxton Circuit (Hampshire)	10 May	Ash Hand	Ash Hand	Ash Hand	Team Pyro
3	R6	Thruxton Circuit (Hampshire)	10 May	Ash Hand	Ash Hand	Ash Hand	Team Pyro
4	R7	Oulton Park (Island Circuit, Cheshire)	6 June	Ant Whorton-Eales	Ashley Sutton	Paul Rivett	WDE Motorsport
4	R8	Oulton Park (Island Circuit, Cheshire)	7 June	Ash Hand	Ash Hand	Ash Hand	Team Pyro
5	R9	Croft Circuit (North Yorkshire)	27 June	Paul Rivett	Ashley Sutton	Ashley Sutton	Team BMR Restart with Pyro
5	R10	Croft Circuit (North Yorkshire)	28 June	Ash Hand	Ant Whorton-Eales	Ash Hand	Team Pyro
6	R11	Knockhill Racing Circuit (National Circuit, Fife)	23 August	Ash Hand	Ash Hand	Ash Hand	Team Pyro
6	R12	Knockhill Racing Circuit (National Circuit, Fife)	23 August	Ash Hand	Ashley Sutton	Ash Hand	Team Pyro
7	R13	Rockingham Motor Speedway (International Super Sports Car Circuit, Northamptonshire)	6 September	Ash Hand	Paul Rivett	Ashley Sutton	Team BMR Restart with Pyro
7	R14	Rockingham Motor Speedway (International Super Sports Car Circuit, Northamptonshire)	6 September	Ashley Sutton	Ash Hand	Ant Whorton-Eales	Maximum Motorsport
8	R15	Silverstone Circuit (National Circuit, Northamptonshire)	27 September	Ant Whorton-Eales	Paul Rivett	Ashley Sutton	Team BMR Restart with Pyro
8	R16	Silverstone Circuit (National Circuit, Northamptonshire)	27 September	Ant Whorton-Eales	Paul Rivett	Ant Whorton-Eales	Maximum Motorsport
9	R17	Brands Hatch (Grand Prix Circuit, Kent)	11 October	Ant Whorton-Eales	Ashley Sutton	Ashley Sutton	Team BMR Restart with Pyro
9	R18	Brands Hatch (Grand Prix Circuit, Kent)	11 October	Ant Whorton-Eales	Luke Kidsley	Ashley Sutton	Team BMR Restart with Pyro

== Championship standings ==
=== Drivers' championship ===
Points system
**1st**	**2nd**	**3rd**	**4th**	**5th**	**6th**	**7th**	**8th**	**9th**	**10th**	**11th**	**12th**	**13th**	**14th**	**15th**	**16th**	**17th**	**18th**	**19th**	**20th**	Fastest lap
32	28	25	22	20	18	16	14	12	11	10	9	8	7	6	5	4	3	2	1	2

Notes

- A driver's best 16 scores counted towards the championship, with any other points being discarded.

Pos	Driver	BHI		DON			THR		OUL		CRO		KNO		ROC		SIL		BHGP		Total	Drop	Pen.	Points
1	Ashley Sutton	C	2	**1**	**7**	2	2	2	5	Ret	1	2	2	3	1	**5**	1	2	1	1	475	16		459
2	Ash Hand	C	**3**	Ret	1	4	**1**	**1**	3	**1**	3	**1**	**1**	**1**	**2**	3	4	6	2	7	470	16		454
3	Ant Whorton-Eales	C	1	2	2	**1**	3	4	**2**	2	7	3	4	5	3	1	**3**	**1**	**Ret**	**DNS**	428		2	426
4	Paul Rivett	C	6	15	3	5	4	3	1	4	**2**	4	3	2	Ret	2	2	4	Ret	Ret	357		2	355
5	Charles Ladell	C	5	6	8	10	8	5	6	5	5	6	6	6	8	8	Ret	DSQ	13	11	253		17	236
6	Rory Collingbourne	C	11	9	10	7	9	8	8	15	9	13	10	10	4	6	12	15	6	8	222	12		210
7	Jack Mitchell	C	13	5	4	3	7	9	10	6	4	5	7	9	DNS	DNS					202			202
8	George Jackson	C	8	16	9	8	10	11	12	10	13	10	11	8	6	4	8	Ret	8	Ret	197			197
9	Jordan Stilp	C	4	3	6	6	5	10	4	3	10	Ret									172			172
10	Dan Holland	C	DNS	8	13	17	Ret	13	9	8	11	7	8	7			Ret	3	Ret	3	164			164
11	Thomas Grundy	C	DNS	12	Ret	14	11	12	14	12	8	9	9	11	Ret	12	14	9	10	6	156		2	154
12	Rory Green	C	14	10	16	12	13	15	13	11	15	Ret	13	12	5	13	13	10	11	Ret	144			144
13	Mark Howard	C	10	13	14	16	12	14	16	13	Ret	12	12	Ret	9	10	10	11	12	Ret	129			129
14	Brett Smith	C	7	4	5	9			11	9	6	Ret									110		2	108
15	Jon Maybin						6	6	7	7									3	Ret	93			93
16	Josh Price														7	11	7	5	4	Ret	84			84
17	Graham Field	C	16	14	15	15			15	14	16	14			Ret	14	15	16			67			67
18	Alex Sedgwick																16	12	5	9	46			46
19	Tom Butler																11	14	7	10	44			44
20	Peter Felix										14	8			10	9					44			44
21	Lee Pattison												5	4							42			42
22	Ben Seyfried	C	15	7	12	11															41		3	38
23	Luke Kidsley														Ret	7	Ret	DNS	DSQ	4	40		6	34
24	Ben Davis																6	7			34			34
25	Ben Palmer																		9	5	32			32
26	Paul Knapp	C	9	Ret	11	13															30			30
27	Paul Streather																		Ret	2	28			28
28	Michele Puccetti																9	8			26			26
29	Freddie Hunt	C	12	11	Ret	Ret															19			19
30	Paul Donkin										12	11									19			19
31	Tom Witts																5	Ret	Ret	Ret	20		2	18
32	James Colburn						Ret	7													16			16
33	Sam Watkins																Ret	13	Ret	Ret	8			8
Pos	Driver	BHI		DON			THR		OUL		CRO		KNO		ROC		SIL		BHGP		Total	Drop	Pen.	Points

Colour	Result
Gold	Winner
Silver	Second place
Bronze	Third place
Green	Points classification
Blue	Non-points classification
Blue	Non-classified finish (NC)
Purple	Retired, not classified (Ret)
Red	Did not qualify (DNQ)
Red	Did not pre-qualify (DNPQ)
Black	Disqualified (DSQ)
White	Did not start (DNS)
White	Withdrew (WD)
White	Race cancelled (C)
Blank	Did not practice (DNP)
Blank	Did not arrive (DNA)
Blank	Excluded (EX)

**Bold** – Pole
Italics – Fastest Lap

=== Teams' championship ===
Pos	Team	BHI		DON			THR		OUL		CRO		KNO		ROC		SIL		BHGP		Points
1	Team Pyro; Team BMR Restart with Pyro	C	2	1	1	2	1	1	3	1	1	1	1	1	1	3	1	2	1	1	967
1	Team Pyro; Team BMR Restart with Pyro	C	3	4	5	4	2	2	5	9	3	2	2	3	2	5	4	5	2	7	967
2	WDE Motorsport	C	6	10	3	5	4	3	1	4	2	4	3	2	5	2	2	3	11	3	582
2	WDE Motorsport	C	14	15	16	12	13	15	13	11	15	Ret	6	6	8	8	13	4	13	11	582
3	Team Cooksport	C	5	6	8	7	6	5	6	5	5	6	5	4	4	4	8	12	3	8	580
3	Team Cooksport	C	9	9	10	10	8	6	7	7	9	10	10	8	6	6	12	15	5	9	580
4	SV Racing	C	1	2	2	1	3	4	2	2	4	3									438
4	SV Racing	C	13	5	4	3	7	9	10	6	7	5									438
5	20Ten Racing	C	4	3	6	6	5	10	4	3	10	8	7	9	10	9	11	13	7	5	393
5	20Ten Racing	C	10	13	14	15			15	14	14	14			Ret	14	15	14	9	10	393
6	JamSport Racing	C	8	8	9	8	10	11	9	8	8	7	8	7	Ret	7	14	9	10	4	359
6	JamSport Racing	C	DNS	12	13	14	11	12	14	12	11	9	9	11	Ret	12	Ret	DNS	DSQ	6	359
7	Maximum Motorsport												4	5	3	1	3	1	Ret	Ret	176
7	Maximum Motorsport																5	Ret	Ret	DNS	176
8	Rangoni Corse																6	7			60
8	Rangoni Corse																9	8			60
9	Team BKR	C	12	11	Ret	Ret	Ret	7													35
10	Paul Streather Motorsport with Finesse Motorsport																		Ret	2	28
Pos	Team	BHI		DON			THR		OUL		CRO		KNO		ROC		SIL		BHGP		Points

Colour	Result
Gold	Winner
Silver	Second place
Bronze	Third place
Green	Points classification
Blue	Non-points classification
Blue	Non-classified finish (NC)
Purple	Retired, not classified (Ret)
Red	Did not qualify (DNQ)
Red	Did not pre-qualify (DNPQ)
Black	Disqualified (DSQ)
White	Did not start (DNS)
White	Withdrew (WD)
White	Race cancelled (C)
Blank	Did not practice (DNP)
Blank	Did not arrive (DNA)
Blank	Excluded (EX)
