= Ash Hand =

British racing driver (born 1994)

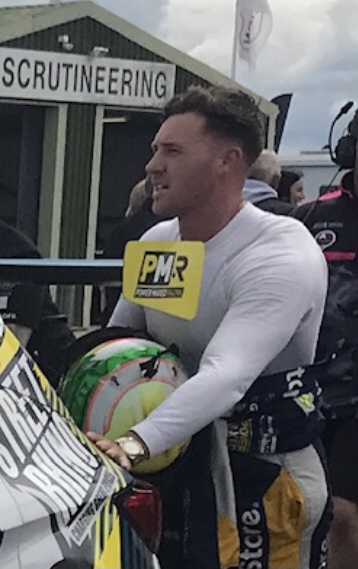
- Hand at Thruxton Circuit in 2022
- Nationality: (United Kingdom) British
- Born: Ashley Joseph Hand; 24 April 1994 (age 32) Nuneaton, Warwickshire, England

British Touring Car Championship career
- Debut season: 2022
- Categorisation: FIA Silver
- Car number: 97
- Former teams: CarStore Power Maxed Racing
- Starts: 30
- Wins: 0
- Podiums: 0
- Poles: 0
- Fastest laps: 0
- Best finish: 19th in 2022

Previous series
- 2019 2018, 2017, 2015, 2014, 2013 2016: British GT Championship; Renault UK Clio Cup; Renault Sport Trophy

Championship titles
- 2019: British GT Championship GT4

Ashley Joseph Hand (born 24 April 1994) is a British racing driver who competed in the 2022 British Touring Car Championship with CarStore Power Maxed Racing. He was the GT4 champion of the 2019 British GT Championship, driving with Tom Canning.

== Career ==
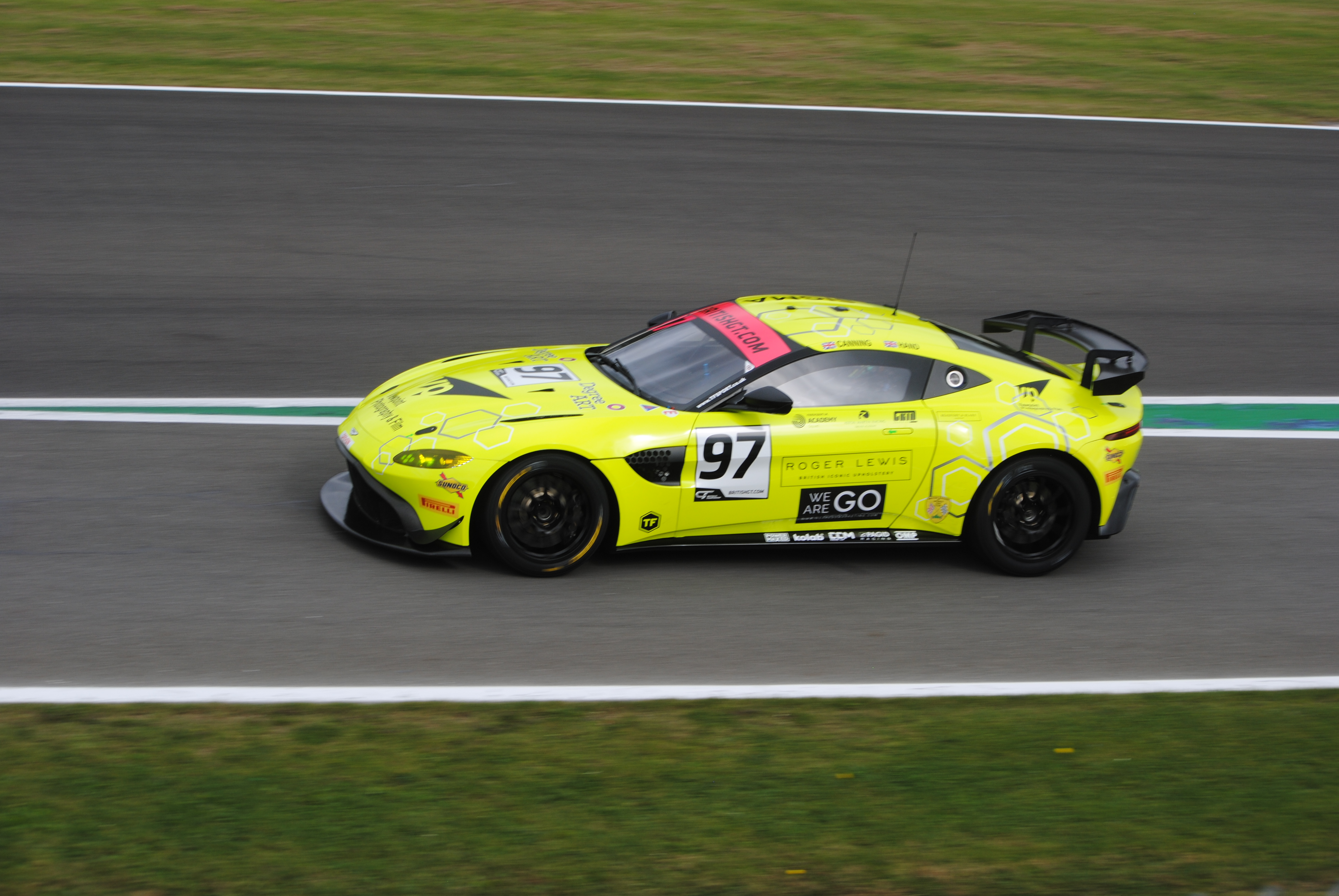
Hand driving for TF Sport at Donington Park during the 2019 British GT Championship season.

=== Karting ===
Hand started karting in 2008, at the age of 13, and over a five year career, he won various titles in the Rotax Junior and Rotax Max categories. He returned to karting in 2015 to compete in the Kartmasters British Grand Prix for the third time in the Rotax Max class.

=== Renault UK Clio Cup ===
Hand made his car racing debut in the 2013 Renault UK Clio Cup with Team Pyro. He came ninth in the standings in his rookie season. He switched to SV Racing for the 2014 season, where he improved to eighth. Switching back to Team Pyro for the 2015 season, Hand finished second in the standings, losing the title to Ashley Sutton due to a mechanical failure in the final round.

Hand returned to the championship part-time in 2017 and 2018, with Team Pyro and Matrix Motorsport respectively.

=== Renault Sport Trophy ===
Hand competed in selected rounds of the AM class and the Endurance Trophy of the 2016 Renault Sport Trophy, where he was 22nd in the Endurance Trophy and 14th in the AM class.

=== British GT Championship ===
Hand joined TF Sport alongside Tom Canning for the GT4 category of the 2019 British GT Championship. With one win and four podiums, they won the GT4 championship title.

=== British Touring Car Championship ===
==== 2022 ====
Following a two-year sabbatical, it was announced in 2022 that Hand would partner Michael Crees at Power Maxed Racing for the 2022 British Touring Car Championship. With 55 points scored across the season, Hand finished 19th in the overall standings, and third in the Jack Sears Trophy.

==== 2023 ====
Although Hand signed a multi-year contract in 2022, he announced via social media that he would sit out from the championship in 2023.

== Karting record ==
=== Karting career summary ===
Season	Series	Position
2008	Kartmasters British Grand Prix - Rotax Minimax	25th
2008	BRDC Stars of Tomorrow Minimax Championship	9th
2009	Super 1 National Rotax Max Junior	11th
2009	MSA Kartmasters Grand Prix - Rotax Junior	1st
2010	Formula Kart Stars - Junior Max	1st
2010	Kartmasters British Grand Prix - Rotax Junior	2nd
2010	Rotax Max Challenge Grand Finals - Junior	28th
2010	Super 1 National Rotax Max Junior	9th
2011	Trent Valley Kart Club - Senior Rotax	28th
2011	Kartmasters British Grand Prix - Rotax Max	31st
2012	Super 1 National Rotax Max Championship	11th
2012	Kartmasters British Grand Prix - Rotax Max	1st
2012	Rotax International Open - Senior	9th
2012	Rotax Max Euro Challenge Senior	10th
2012	Rotax Max Wintercup - Senior	3rd
2015	Kartmasters British Grand Prix - Rotax Max	3rd

== Racing record ==
=== Racing career summary ===
Season	Series	Team	Races	Wins	Poles	F/Laps	Podiums	Points	Position
2013	Renault Clio Cup UK	Team Pyro	16	0	0	0	1	213	9th
2014	Renault Clio Cup UK	SV Racing	18	0	1	3	5	284	8th
2015	Renault Clio Cup UK	Team Pyro	18	7	8	7	13	454	**2nd**
2016	Renault Sport Endurance Trophy	Oregon Team	2	0	0	0	0	12	22nd
2016	Renault Sport Trophy - AM	Oregon Team	3	0	0	0	0	12	14th
2017	Renault Clio Cup UK	Team Pyro	6	0	0	0	0	73	17th
2018	Renault Clio Cup UK	Matrix Motorsport	2	0	0	0	0	20	19th
2019	British GT Championship - GT4	TF Sport	9	1	0	0	5	140	**1st**
2022	British Touring Car Championship	CarStore Power Maxed Racing	30	0	0	0	0	55	19th

=== Complete British GT Championship results ===
(key) (Races in bold indicate pole position) (Races in italics indicate fastest lap)

Year	Team	Car	Class	1	2	3	4	5	6	7	8	9	DC	Points
2019	TF Sport	Aston Martin Vantage GT4	GT4	OUL; 1 Ret	OUL; 2; 27	SNE; 1; 20	SNE; 2; 15	SIL; 1; 15	DON; 1; 19	SPA; 1; 14	BRH; 1; 15	DON; 1; 14	1st	140

=== Complete British Touring Car Championship results ===
(key) Races in bold indicate pole position (1 point awarded – 2002–2003 all races, 2004–present just in first race) Races in italics indicate fastest lap (1 point awarded all races) * signifies that driver lead race for at least one lap (1 point awarded – 2002 just in feature races, 2003–present all races)

Year	Team	Car	1	2	3	4	5	6	7	8	9	10	11	12	13	14	15	16	17	18	19	20	21	22	23	24	25	26	27	28	29	30	DC	Points
2022	CarStore Power Maxed Racing	Vauxhall Astra	DON; 1; 18	DON; 2; 17	DON; 3; 23	BRH; 1; 11	BRH; 2 Ret	BRH; 3; 21	THR; 1; 10	THR; 2; 10	THR; 3; 9	OUL; 1 Ret	OUL; 2; 22	OUL; 3; 9	CRO; 1; 18	CRO; 2; 17	CRO; 3; 13	KNO; 1; 25	KNO; 2 Ret	KNO; 3; 17	SNE; 1; 13	SNE; 2; 10	SNE; 3 Ret	THR; 1; 5	THR; 2 Ret	THR; 3; 17	SIL; 1 Ret	SIL; 2; 21	SIL; 3 Ret	BRH; 1; 18	BRH; 2; 17	BRH; 3; 15	19th	55

Sporting positions
Preceded by Jack Mitchell	British GT Championship; GT4 Champion; 2019; With: Tom Canning	Succeeded by Jamie Caroline; Daniel Vaughan
Preceded by Jack Mitchell	British GT Championship; GT4 Silver Champion; 2019; With: Tom Canning	Succeeded by Jamie Caroline; Daniel Vaughan
