= Mark Howard (racing driver) =

British racing driver (born 1965)

- Nationality: (United Kingdom) British
- Born: 9 January 1965 (age 61) Norwich, Norfolk, UK

British Touring Car Championship career
- Debut season: 2016
- Current team: Team BKR
- Car number: 38
- Starts: 30
- Wins: 0
- Poles: 0
- Fastest laps: 0
- Best finish: 36th in 2016

Previous series
- 2014–15 2011 1993: Renault Clio Cup United Kingdom; Volkswagen Racing Cup; Renault 5 ELF Turbo UK Cup

Championship titles
- 2015 1993: Renault UK Clio Cup Masters; Renault 5 ELF Turbo UK Cup

Mark Howard (born 9 January 1965) is a British racing driver who competed in the British Touring Car Championship in 2016, after winning the Renault Clio Cup United Kingdom Masters title in 2015.

== Racing career ==
Howard began his career in the Renault 5 ELF Turbo UK Cup, which he won in 1993. He then had an 18-year hiatus from racing until 2011 when he returned to racing in the Volkswagen Racing Cup. He went on to finish ninth in the championship standings that season. He switched to the Renault Clio Cup United Kingdom championship in 2014, he finished 12th in the championship that year. He went on to win the Clio Cup Masters title in 2015, finishing 13th in the overall standings. In March 2016, it was announced that Howard would make his British Touring Car Championship debut with the debuting Team BKR driving a Volkswagen CC.

== Racing record ==
=== Complete British Touring Car Championship results ===
(key) (Races in bold indicate pole position – 1 point awarded just in first race; races in italics indicate fastest lap – 1 point awarded all races; * signifies that driver led race for at least one lap – 1 point given all races)

Year	Team	Car	1	2	3	4	5	6	7	8	9	10	11	12	13	14	15	16	17	18	19	20	21	22	23	24	25	26	27	28	29	30	DC	Pts
2016	Team BKR	Volkswagen CC	BRH; 1; 23	BRH; 2; 27	BRH; 3 Ret	DON; 1; 23	DON; 2; 23	DON; 3 Ret	THR; 1 Ret	THR; 2; 26	THR; 3; 19	OUL; 1; 31	OUL; 2 Ret	OUL; 3 Ret	CRO; 1 Ret	CRO; 2; 27	CRO; 3; 24	SNE; 1; 24	SNE; 2; 21	SNE; 3 Ret	KNO; 1; 26	KNO; 2; 23	KNO; 3; 23	ROC; 1 Ret	ROC; 2; 20	ROC; 3 Ret	SIL; 1; 16	SIL; 2; 28	SIL; 3; 19	BRH; 1 Ret	BRH; 2; 26	BRH; 3; 23	36th	-3
