= 2014 Renault UK Clio Cup =

The 2014 Courier Connections Renault UK Clio Cup was a multi-event, one make motor racing championship held across England and one event in Scotland. The championship featured a mix of professional motor racing teams and privately funded drivers competing in the new Clio Renaultsport 200 Turbo EDC that conformed to the technical regulations for the championship. It formed part of the extensive program of support categories built up around the BTCC centerpiece after signing a three-year extension to be on the package until the end of 2016. It was the 19th Renault Clio Cup United Kingdom season, commencing on 30 March at Brands Hatch – on the circuit's Indy configuration – and concluded on 12 October at the same venue, utilising the Grand Prix circuit, after sixteen races held at eight meetings, all in support of the 2014 British Touring Car Championship season.

VitalRacing with Team Pyro driver Mike Bushell claimed the championship title by 43 points ahead of SV Racing with KX's Josh Cook, with Graduate Cup winner Jordan Stilp of 20Ten Racing finishing third, a further 21 points in arrears. With only one win in the first half of the season, Bushell trailed Cook for much of the early season. However, a run of three wins in four races at Knockhill and Rockingham allowed Bushell to achieve an advantage over Cook. Cook won six races to Bushell's four, but three retirements cost Cook as a whole. Stilp recorded three wins during the campaign, including the season's only maximum score with a double win (as well as the bonus points for fastest laps) at Croft. James Colburn and Alex Morgan each took two victories, but both finished behind Ant Whorton-Eales, who achieved six podium finishes without a victory. The only other driver to take a victory was Paul Rivett, who won the final race of the season at Brands Hatch, en route to the Masters Cup title. The entrants' championship was comfortably won by SV Racing with KX, finishing over 200 points clear of the next best entrant.

== Championship changes ==
The championship introduced the brand new Clio Renaultsport 200 Turbo EDC as used in the Renault Clio Eurocup, replacing the older Clio Renaultsport 200. The new car featured a 1.6-litre turbo-powered Renault engine, producing 220 hp, an increase of 15 hp from 2012. The cars also have a sequential six-speed gearbox with paddle-shift gear change.

== Teams and drivers ==
All teams and drivers were British-registered.

Team	No.	Drivers	Class	Rounds
Team Pyro; VitalRacing with Team Pyro	1	Mike Bushell		All
Team Pyro; VitalRacing with Team Pyro	5	Lee Pattison	M	3–8
Team Pyro; VitalRacing with Team Pyro	8	Finlay Crocker	M	7
Team Pyro; VitalRacing with Team Pyro	37	Rob Smith	G	1–3
SV Racing; SV Racing with KX	2	Alex Morgan		All
SV Racing; SV Racing with KX	4	Ash Hand	G	All
SV Racing; SV Racing with KX	10	Ant Whorton-Eales	G	All
SV Racing; SV Racing with KX	14	Simon Horrobin	M	8–9
SV Racing; SV Racing with KX	27	Paul Donkin		9
SV Racing; SV Racing with KX	66	Josh Cook	G	All
SV Racing; SV Racing with KX	79	Jamie Clarke		7
Westbourne Motorsport	3	James Colburn	G	All
Westbourne Motorsport	7	Devon Modell		1–8
Westbourne Motorsport	17	Gary Jenner	M	9
JHR	5	Lee Pattison	M	1–2
Jam Sport	6	Daniel Holland		8–9
Jam Sport	41	Paul Knapp	M	6–7, 9
WDE Motorsport	22	Paul Rivett	M	All
WDE Motorsport	32	Charles Ladell	G	4–9
Mark Fish Motorsport	38	Mark Howard	M	1–2, 4
20Ten Racing	38	Mark Howard	M	5–9
20Ten Racing	65	Craig Milner	M	1–2, 4–7
20Ten Racing	92	Jordan Stilp	G	All

Icon	Class
M	Masters Cup
G	Graduate Cup

== Race calendar and results ==
The provisional calendar was announced by the championship organisers on 23 September 2013. The championship expanded to nine double header race meetings making an 18 round season, up from 16 in 2012. The series returned to Scotland and the Knockhill Racing Circuit for the first time since 2010. Originally, it was announced that the Silverstone Circuit would return after a one year hiatus, with the series missing the round at Thruxton Circuit. However, organisers released a revised calendar with the Thruxton round reinstated and the Silverstone round dropped, due to a date clash with the 2014 Eurocup Clio. All rounds were held in the United Kingdom.

Round		Circuit	Date	Pole position	Fastest lap	Winning driver	Winning team
1	R1	Brands Hatch (Indy Circuit, Kent)	29 March	Alex Morgan	Paul Rivett	Alex Morgan	SV Racing
1	R2	Brands Hatch (Indy Circuit, Kent)	30 March	Alex Morgan	Mike Bushell	Alex Morgan	SV Racing
2	R3	Donington Park (National Circuit, Leicestershire)	20 April	Josh Cook	Mike Bushell	Josh Cook	SV Racing with KX
2	R4	Donington Park (National Circuit, Leicestershire)	20 April	Jordan Stilp	Jordan Stilp	Josh Cook	SV Racing with KX
3	R5	Thruxton Circuit (Hampshire)	4 May	Lee Pattison	Lee Pattison	Mike Bushell	Team Pyro
3	R6	Thruxton Circuit (Hampshire)	4 May	Mike Bushell	Mike Bushell	James Colburn	Westbourne Motorsport
4	R7	Oulton Park (International Circuit, Cheshire)	7 June	Ant Whorton-Eales	Josh Cook	Josh Cook	SV Racing with KX
4	R8	Oulton Park (International Circuit, Cheshire)	8 June	Ant Whorton-Eales	Mike Bushell	James Colburn	Westbourne Motorsport
5	R9	Croft Circuit (North Yorkshire)	29 June	Jordan Stilp	Jordan Stilp	Jordan Stilp	20Ten Racing
5	R10	Croft Circuit (North Yorkshire)	29 June	Jordan Stilp	Jordan Stilp	Jordan Stilp	20Ten Racing
6	R11	Snetterton Motor Racing Circuit (300 Circuit, Norfolk)	2 August	Mike Bushell	Mike Bushell	Josh Cook	SV Racing with KX
6	R12	Snetterton Motor Racing Circuit (300 Circuit, Norfolk)	3 August	Mike Bushell	Mike Bushell	Josh Cook	SV Racing with KX
7	R13	Knockhill Racing Circuit (Fife)	23 August	Mike Bushell	Ash Hand	Mike Bushell	VitalRacing with Team Pyro
7	R14	Knockhill Racing Circuit (Fife)	24 August	Mike Bushell	Ash Hand	Jordan Stilp	20Ten Racing
8	R15	Rockingham Motor Speedway (International Super Sports Car Circuit, Northamptonshire)	6 September	Mike Bushell	Mike Bushell	Mike Bushell	VitalRacing with Team Pyro
8	R16	Rockingham Motor Speedway (International Super Sports Car Circuit, Northamptonshire)	7 September	Josh Cook	Josh Cook	Mike Bushell	VitalRacing with Team Pyro
9	R17	Brands Hatch (Grand Prix Circuit, Kent)	11 October	Ash Hand	Ash Hand	Josh Cook	SV Racing with KX
9	R18	Brands Hatch (Grand Prix Circuit, Kent)	12 October	Josh Cook	Mike Bushell	Paul Rivett	WDE Motorsport

== Championship standings ==
=== Drivers' championship ===
A driver's best 16 scores counted towards the championship, with any other points being discarded.

Pos	Driver	BHI		DON		THR		OUL		CRO		SNE		KNO		ROC		BHGP		Total	Drop	Pen.	Points
1	Mike Bushell	4	3	2	Ret	1	**4**	4	7	6	11	**2**	**6**	**1**	**3**	**1**	1	4	3	425	10		415
2	Josh Cook	3	8	**1**	1	2	3	1	3	4	Ret	1	1	8	8	9	**Ret**	1	**Ret**	375		3	372
3	Jordan Stilp	7	10	5	**6**	7	6	7	4	**1**	**1**	9	7	3	1	2	3	12	5	374	20	3	351
4	Ant Whorton-Eales	10	4	3	4	9	7	**10**	**2**	3	5	6	3	2	4	6	4	2	Ret	353	11		342
5	James Colburn	6	6	4	7	5	1	3	1	10	2	3	5	7	7	10	5	8	Ret	344	11	3	330
6	Alex Morgan	**1**	**1**	6	3	Ret	5	5	6	5	7	8	Ret	5	10	5	10	3	2	330			330
7	Paul Rivett	11	2	8	5	Ret	2	6	12	12	4	Ret	2	6	11	4	2	6	1	316		2	314
8	Ash Hand	9	11	7	2	4	9	Ret	Ret	2	3	Ret	10	4	2	3	9	**7**	7	289		5	284
9	Lee Pattison	5	9	10	10	**3**	10	2	5	8	6	7	4	9	5	8	Ret			256			256
10	Devon Modell	8	7	9	8	6	8	9	9	7	Ret	5	9	11	6	12	8			211			211
11	Charles Ladell							8	8	9	8	4	8	10	9	11	6	5	6	179		2	177
12	Mark Howard	12	12	13	12			11	10	11	9	10	11	Ret	16	14	11	Ret	Ret	121		3	118
13	Craig Milner	13	13	12	11			12	11	13	10	11	Ret	14	14					97			97
14	Rob Smith	2	5	11	9	8	11													94			94
15	Daniel Holland															7	7	Ret	4	54			54
16	Paul Knapp											12	12	Ret	15			11	8	48			48
17	Simon Horrobin															13	12	9	Ret	29			29
18	Paul Donkin																	10	9	23			23
19	Gary Jenner																	13	10	19			19
20	Finlay Crocker													12	13					17			17
21	Jamie Clarke													13	12					17			17
Pos	Driver	BHI		DON		THR		OUL		CRO		SNE		KNO		ROC		BHGP		Total	Drop	Pen.	Points

Colour	Result
Gold	Winner
Silver	Second place
Bronze	Third place
Green	Points finish
Blue	Non-points finish
Blue	Non-classified finish (NC)
Purple	Retired (Ret)
Red	Did not qualify (DNQ)
Red	Did not pre-qualify (DNPQ)
Black	Disqualified (DSQ)
White	Did not start (DNS)
White	Withdrew (WD)
White	Race cancelled (C)
Blank	Did not practice (DNP)
Blank	Did not arrive (DNA)
Blank	Excluded (EX)

**Bold** – Pole
Italics – Fastest Lap
