= Birchwood High School =

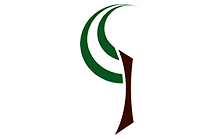

Location
- Parsonage Lane; Bishop's Stortford, Hertfordshire, CM23 5BD; England; 51.8743°N 0.1839°E

Information
- Type: Academy
- Motto: your dreams, your future, our challenge
- Established: 1991
- Local authority: Hertfordshire County Council
- Department for Education URN: 137637 Tables
- Ofsted: Reports
- Principal: Sam Griffin
- Staff: 200+
- Gender: Coeducational
- Age: 11 to 18
- Enrolment: 1354
- Houses: Waytemore; Hadham; Stort; Dane
- Colours: Maroon & Silver
- Website: https://www.birchwoodonline.co.uk/

Birchwood High School is a coeducational secondary school and sixth form with academy status located in Bishop's Stortford, Hertfordshire, England.

The school was converted to an academy in February 2012. It used to be a community school under the direct control of Hertfordshire County Council. The school continues to coordinate with the council for admissions.

Birchwood High School offers General Certificate of Secondary Education (GCSEs) and Business and Technology Education Council (BTECs) as courses of study for pupils, with A Levels offered in the sixth form.

The school has been recognised by The Good Schools Guide for the standard of its maths education in 2009, 2011 and 2012.

== History ==
Birchwood High School was founded when Hadham Hall and The Margaret Dane schools merged in 1991 and the name Birchwood High School was voted for by students from both schools and opened with approximately 450 students; it now has around 1500.

Between 2004-2009, the school added a specialist sixth form block, sports centre and main building housing classrooms, a new library and a staff area.

The school became an academy in 2012 and is part of the Bishop's Stortford Educational Trust working with other secondary schools and local primaries to sponsor new schools in the Bishop's Stortford North Development.

The school celebrated its twenty fifth anniversary in 2016.

== Notable former pupils ==
- Ashley Sutton, racing driver
