= Team BKR =

British auto racing team

(United Kingdom) Team BKR
- Founded: 2010
- Team principal(s): Nico Ferrari
- Current series: BTCC
- Noted drivers: Mark Howard; Árón Smith
- Website: http://teambkr.co.uk/

Team BKR is a British auto racing team formed in 2010 as Bubble & Kick Racing and based in Basildon, Essex. The team raced in the British Touring Car Championship, in 2016.

== Renault Clio Cup United Kingdom ==
Having announced their participation in March 2015, with Freddie Hunt driving the 2014 championship winning car of Mike Bushell. At the third round of the championship at Thruxton Circuit, James Colburn took over from Hunt, who had other duties that weekend. However, Hunt didn't return to do any further rounds.

== British Touring Car Championship ==
=== Volkswagen CC (2016) ===
After having announced that they would join the new-for-2016 BTEC Development Series, which was eventually postponed to 2017. A last minute deal meant that they would make their British Touring Car Championship debut with 2 ex-Team BMR Volkswagen CC's, with Mark Howard and Árón Smith driving.

The team had their first podium at the first round at Brands Hatch, with Árón Smith taking 3rd place in the second race of the day. The team's second podium came at round two at Donington Park, with Árón Smith once again taking 3rd in the second race of the day.

At Rockingham, the team scored their first victory with Árón Smith winning the "reverse pole" 3rd race of the day. Smith ran from pole to flag in the lead having to defend against two safety car restarts.
