= Josh Cook =

British racing driver (born 1991)

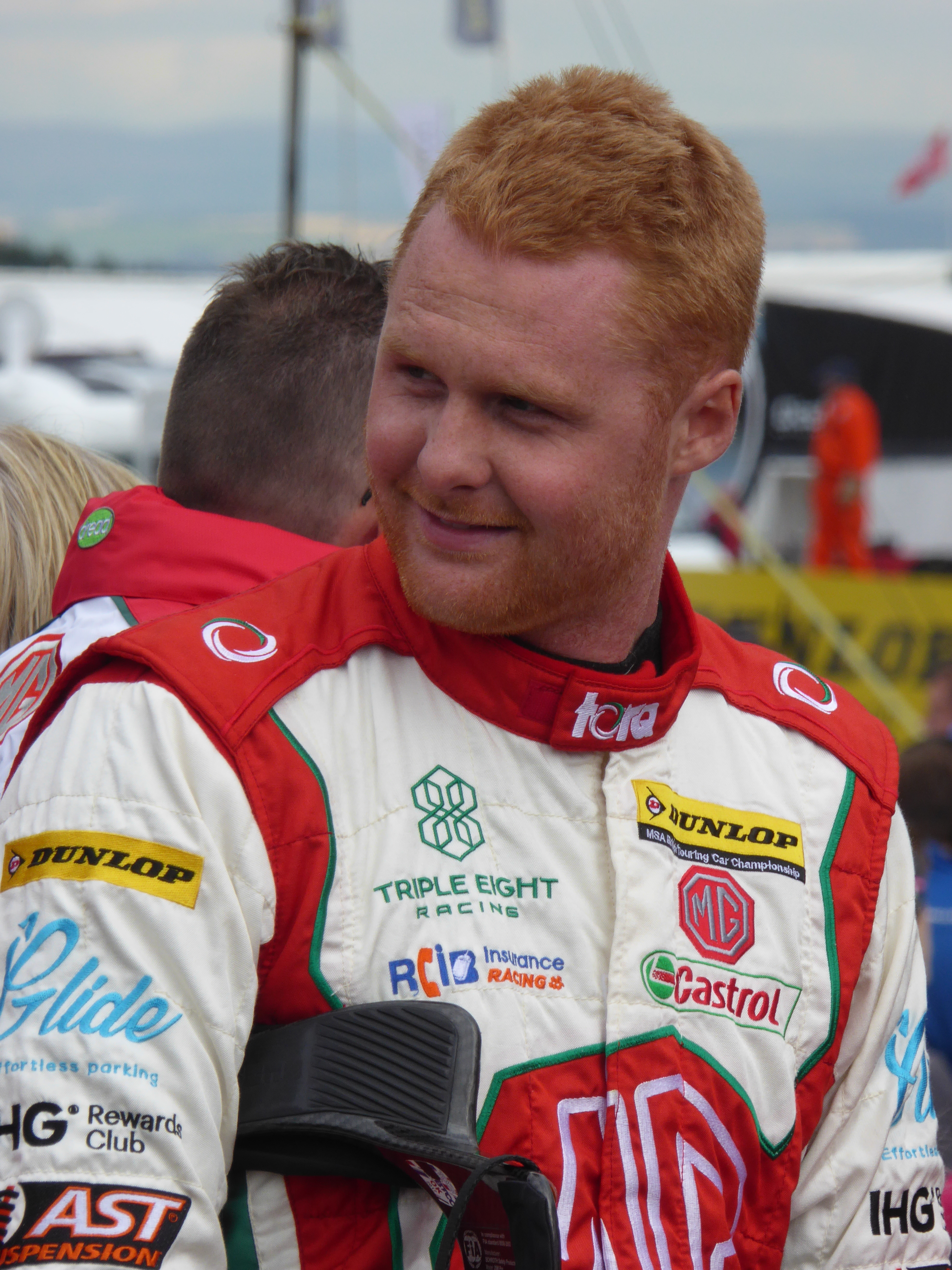
- Cook in 2017.
- Nationality: (United Kingdom) British
- Born: Joshua Alexander Cook; 15 June 1991 (age 35) Bath, Somerset, United Kingdom

British Touring Car Championship career
- Debut season: 2015
- Current team: Speedworks Corolla Racing
- Categorisation: FIA Silver
- Car number: 66
- Former teams: One Motorsport; Power Maxed Racing; Team Parker Racing with Maximum Motorsport; Triple Eight Racing; LKQ Euro Car Parts with Synetiq; Toyota Gazoo Racing UK with IAA
- Starts: 350
- Wins: 23
- Poles: 6
- Fastest laps: 31
- Best finish: 3rd in 2021

Previous series
- 2014 2012–2014 2011 2010 2009–2010 2007–2008 2003–2007: Ginetta GT4 Supercup; Renault Clio Cup United Kingdom; Production Touring Car Trophy; Renault Clio Cup United Kingdom; Stock Hatch Championship; SAXMAX Saloon Car Championship; Karting

Championship titles
- 2015: Jack Sears Trophy

Joshua Alexander Cook (born 15 June 1991) is a British racing driver who is set to compete the British Touring Car Championship for Speedworks Corolla Racing. He debuted in 2015, after being the runner-up in the Renault Clio Cup United Kingdom in 2014.

== Racing career ==
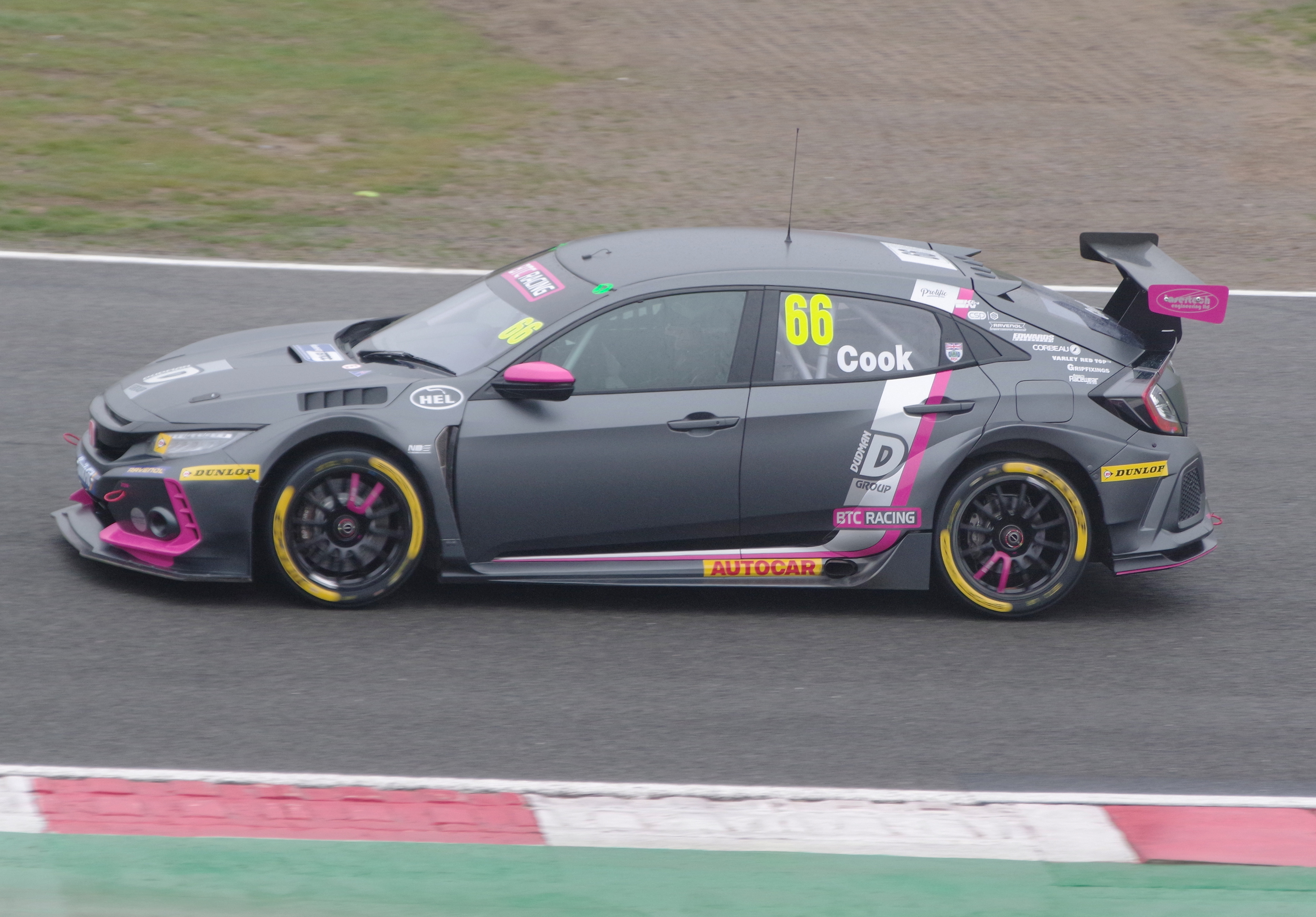
Cook competing at Brands Hatch during the 2019 British Touring Car Championship.

Cook began his career in karting in 2003, before graduating to the SAXMAX Saloon Car Championship in 2007. He switched to the Renault Clio Cup United Kingdom for 2012, taking a two victories on his way to finishing fifth overall, with 287 points, and winning the Rookie Cup. He had previously done a partial season in 2010. He joined JHR Developments for the 2013 Renault Clio Cup United Kingdom season, ending the season fifth in the standings with five podiums. Cook went on to race for SV Racing in the 2014 Renault Clio Cup United Kingdom season, he ended the season second in the championship standings. In March 2015, it was announced that Cook would make his British Touring Car Championship debut with Power Maxed Racing driving a Chevrolet Cruze under the #RacingforHeroes banner He took his best finish today of seventh in race two, at Donington Park.

For his second season of BTCC racing, Cook joined the works MG Triple Eight Racing squad alongside rookie Ashley Sutton in the MG 6 GT. Cook qualified second at Donington Park to create an MG 1 - 2, a bad start for both MG's allowed Matt Jackson to jump the pair but Josh managed to hold onto second from the Toyota of Tom Ingram. After a less competitive mid-season, Cook finished second in race 25 at Silverstone behind his teammate. However, after the race both MG's were disqualified for technical infringements. Cook finished third at the final meeting of the season, by taking third place on the last corner from Subaru's Jason Plato. Cook finished the season in 12th with 175 points.

In subsequent seasons, Cook became a regular race winner and championship contender in the British Touring Car Championship, securing multiple victories and Independent class titles. He continued racing with BTC Racing before later joining Toyota Gazoo Racing UK.

Cook rejoined One Motorsport at the start of the 2025 season, before returning to Speedworks Motorsport mid-season to drive a Toyota Corolla GR Sport for Toyota Gazoo Racing UK with IAA from the Donington Park round onward.

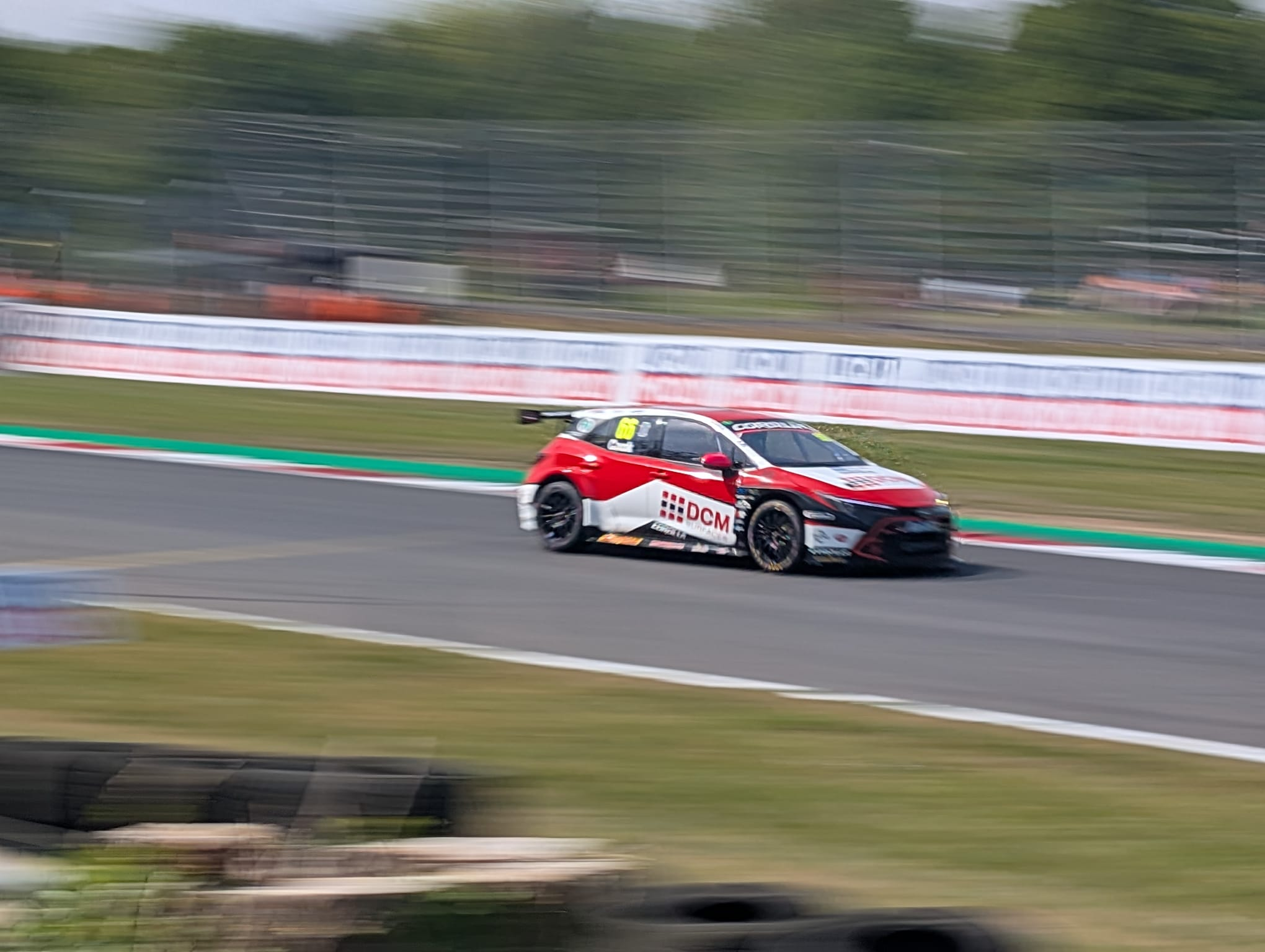
Josh Cook driving for Speedworks Toyota, 2026 British Touring Car Championship

== Racing record ==
=== Complete British Touring Car Championship results ===
(key) (Races in bold indicate pole position – 1 point awarded just in first race; races in italics indicate fastest lap – 1 point awarded all races; * signifies that driver led race for at least one lap – 1 point given all races; ^{Superscript} number indicates points-scoring qualifying race position)

Year	Team	Car	1	2	3	4	5	6	7	8	9	10	11	12	13	14	15	16	17	18	19	20	21	22	23	24	25	26	27	28	29	30	DC	Points
2015	#RacingforHeroes	Chevrolet Cruze 4dr	BRH; 1; 13	BRH; 2; 14	BRH; 3 Ret	DON; 1; 13	DON; 2; 7	**DON**; **3**; 7*	THR; 1; 9	THR; 2; 18	THR; 3; 9	OUL; 1; 12	OUL; 2; 26	OUL; 3; 13	CRO; 1; 12	CRO; 2 Ret	CRO; 3; 15	SNE; 1; 15	SNE; 2; 17	SNE; 3; 16	KNO; 1; 16	KNO; 2; 15	KNO; 3; 13	ROC; 1; 13	ROC; 2; 3	ROC; 3; 10	SIL; 1; 14	SIL; 2; 12	SIL; 3; 16	BRH; 1; 9	BRH; 2; 16	BRH; 3; 15	15th	97
2016	MG Racing RCIB Insurance	MG 6 GT	BRH; 1; 5	BRH; 2 Ret	BRH; 3; 14	DON; 1; 2	DON; 2; 7	DON; 3; 9	THR; 1 Ret	THR; 2; 12	THR; 3; 4	OUL; 1; 7	OUL; 2; 6	OUL; 3; 5	CRO; 1; 17	CRO; 2; 14	CRO; 3; 6	SNE; 1; 26	SNE; 2; 13	SNE; 3; 9	KNO; 1; 18	KNO; 2; 16	KNO; 3 Ret	ROC; 1; 4	ROC; 2 Ret	ROC; 3; 15	SIL; 1 DSQ	SIL; 2; 17	SIL; 3; 7	BRH; 1; 3	BRH; 2; 4	BRH; 3; 7	12th	175
2017	Team Parker Racing with Maximum Motorsport	Ford Focus ST	BRH; 1; 13	BRH; 2; 7	BRH; 3; 26	DON; 1; 10	DON; 2; 4	DON; 3; 7	THR; 1 Ret	THR; 2; 30	THR; 3; 22	OUL; 1; 8	OUL; 2; 6	**OUL**; **3** Ret																			18th	75
2017	MG Racing RCIB Insurance	MG 6 GT													CRO; 1; 7	CRO; 2; 23	CRO; 3; 23	SNE; 1 Ret	SNE; 2; 28	SNE; 3 Ret	KNO; 1; 12	KNO; 2 Ret	KNO; 3; 29	ROC; 1; 4	ROC; 2 Ret	ROC; 3 Ret	SIL; 1 EX	SIL; 2; 18	SIL; 3 Ret	BRH; 1; 25	BRH; 2; 26	BRH; 3 Ret	18th	75
2018	Power Maxed TAG Racing	Vauxhall Astra	BRH; 1 NC	BRH; 2; 15	BRH; 3; 10	**DON**; **1**; 1*	**DON**; **2**; 7	DON; 3; 2	THR; 1; 9	THR; 2; 1*	THR; 3; 6	OUL; 1; 17	OUL; 2; 27	OUL; 3; 11	CRO; 1; 7	CRO; 2 Ret	CRO; 3; 18	SNE; 1; 4	SNE; 2; 2	SNE; 3; 7	ROC; 1 Ret	ROC; 2; 12	ROC; 3; 12	KNO; 1; 5	KNO; 2; 2	KNO; 3; 6	SIL; 1 Ret	SIL; 2; 12	SIL; 3; 4	BRH; 1; 22	BRH; 2; 10	**BRH**; **3**; 2*	6th	246
2019	BTC Racing	Honda Civic Type R (FK8)	BRH; 1; 1*	**BRH**; **2**; 7*	BRH; 3; 4	DON; 1; 24	DON; 2; 8	DON; 3; 3	THR; 1; 11	THR; 2; 10	THR; 3; 1*	CRO; 1; 9	CRO; 2; 8	CRO; 3; 2	OUL; 1; 17	OUL; 2; 10	OUL; 3; 6	SNE; 1; 20	SNE; 2; 15	SNE; 3; 2	THR; 1; 4	THR; 2; 1*	THR; 3; 6	KNO; 1; 13	KNO; 2; 9	KNO; 3; 2	SIL; 1; 4	SIL; 2; 5	SIL; 3 NC*	BRH; 1 Ret	BRH; 2; 13	BRH; 3; 5	4th	278
2020	BTC Racing	Honda Civic Type R (FK8)	DON; 1; 13	DON; 2; 10	DON; 3; 3	BRH; 1; 21	BRH; 2 Ret	BRH; 3; 17	OUL; 1 DSQ	OUL; 2; 21	OUL; 3; 11	KNO; 1 Ret	KNO; 2 Ret	KNO; 3; 15	THR; 1; 9	THR; 2; 8	**THR**; **3**; 1*	SIL; 1; 10	SIL; 2; 6	SIL; 3; 7	**CRO**; **1**; 1*	**CRO**; **2**; 1*	CRO; 3; 8	SNE; 1; 8	SNE; 2; 7	SNE; 3; 7	BRH; 1; 8	BRH; 2; 9	BRH; 3; 7				9th	196
2021	BTC Racing	Honda Civic Type R	THR; 1; 1*	**THR**; **2**; 1*	THR; 3; 20	SNE; 1; 16	SNE; 2; 14	SNE; 3; 4	BRH; 1; 9	BRH; 2; 5	BRH; 3; 5	OUL; 1; 15	OUL; 2 Ret	OUL; 3; 12	KNO; 1; 3	KNO; 2; 4	KNO; 3 Ret	THR; 1; 1*	**THR**; **2**; 2*	THR; 3; 7	CRO; 1; 5	CRO; 2; 3	CRO; 3; 5	SIL; 1; 5	SIL; 2 DSQ	SIL; 3; 18	DON; 1; 8	DON; 2; 7	DON; 3; 5	BRH; 1; 1*	**BRH**; **2**; 1*	BRH; 3; 5	3rd	303
2022	Rich Energy BTC Racing	Honda Civic Type R	DON; 1; 8	DON; 2; 5	DON; 3; 3	BRH; 1; 1*	**BRH**; **2**; 1*	BRH; 3; 8	**THR**; **1**; 1*	**THR**; **2**; 1*	THR; 3; 5	OUL; 1; 8	OUL; 2; 9	OUL; 3; 3	CRO; 1; 15	CRO; 2; 11	CRO; 3; 2	KNO; 1; 15	KNO; 2; 13	KNO; 3; 8	SNE; 1; 19	SNE; 2; 15	SNE; 3; 11	THR; 1; 13	THR; 2; 8	THR; 3; 1*	SIL; 1; 13	SIL; 2; 8	**SIL**; **3**; 6	BRH; 1; 11	BRH; 2; 7	BRH; 3; 2	6th	296
2023	One Motorsport with Starline Racing	Honda Civic Type R	DON; 1; 9	DON; 2; 19	DON; 3; 7	BRH; 1; 8	BRH; 2; 7	BRH; 3; 10	SNE; 1; 8	SNE; 2; 27	SNE; 3; 5	THR; 1; 3	THR; 2; 3	THR; 3; 11	OUL; 1; 6	OUL; 2; 5	OUL; 3; 7	CRO; 1; 4	CRO; 2; 5	CRO; 3; 3	KNO; 1 Ret*	KNO; 2; 8	KNO; 3; 2	DON; 1; 7	DON; 2; 5	DON; 3 Ret	SIL; 1; 9	SIL; 2; 7	SIL; 3; 6	BRH; 1; 12	BRH; 2; 7	BRH; 3; 2*	5th	268
2024	LKQ Euro Car Parts with SYNETIQ	Toyota Corolla GR Sport	DON; 1; 6	DON; 2; 4	DON; 3; 9	BRH; 1; 2	BRH; 2; 16	BRH; 3; 11	SNE; 1; 14	SNE; 2; 3	SNE; 3; 3	THR; 1; 5	THR; 2; 6	THR; 3; 6	OUL; 1; 8	OUL; 2; 1*	OUL; 3; 8	CRO; 1; 8	CRO; 2; 1*	CRO; 3; 7	KNO; 1; 2	KNO; 2; 4	KNO; 3 Ret	**DON**; **1**; 4	DON; 2; 4	DON; 3; 4	SIL; 1; 6	SIL; 2; 3	SIL; 3; 3	BRH; 1 Ret	BRH; 2; 7	**BRH**; **3**; 3*	6th	327
2025	One Motorsport	Honda Civic Type R	DON; 1; 6	DON; 2; 20	DON; 3; 11	BRH; 1; 15	BRH; 2; 6	BRH; 3; 6	SNE; 1; 11	SNE; 2; 7	SNE; 3; 3	THR; 1; 3	THR; 2 DSQ	THR; 3; 7	OUL; 1; 9	OUL; 2; 7	OUL; 3 Ret	CRO; 1	CRO; 2	CRO; 3	KNO; 1	KNO; 2	KNO; 3										12th	160
2025	Toyota Gazoo Racing UK with IAA	Toyota Corolla GR Sport																						DON; 1; 18	DON; 2; 6	DON; 3; 11	SIL; 1; 5	SIL; 2; 9	SIL; 3; 2	BRH; 1; 11	BRH; 2; 8	BRH; 3; 1*	12th	160
2026	Speedworks Corolla Racing	Toyota Corolla GR Sport	DON; 1 Ret^{3}	DON; 2; 10	DON; 3 Ret	BRH; 1; 10	BRH; 2; 7	BRH; 3; 5	SNE; 1; 4^{2}	SNE; 2; 12	SNE; 3; 15	OUL; 1; 2^{2}	OUL; 2; 15	OUL; 3; 5	**THR**; **1**; 1*^{1}	**THR**; **2**; 3	THR; 3 Ret	KNO; 1; 13	KNO; 2; 15	KNO; 3; 8	DON; 1 Ret^{3}	DON; 2; 15	DON; 3; 7	**CRO**; **1**; 1*^{1}	**CRO**; **2** Ret	CRO; 3; 4	SIL; 1; 4^{6}	SIL; 2; 10	SIL; 3; 7	BRH; 1; 2^{3}	BRH; 2; 2	BRH; 3; 6	4th	314

Sporting positions
Preceded by Dave Newsham	Jack Sears Trophy; Winner; 2015	Succeeded by Ashley Sutton
Preceded by Ashley Sutton	British Touring Car Championship; Independents' Trophy Winner; 2022-2023	Succeeded by Árón Taylor-Smith
