= Ashley Sutton =

British racing driver (born 1994)

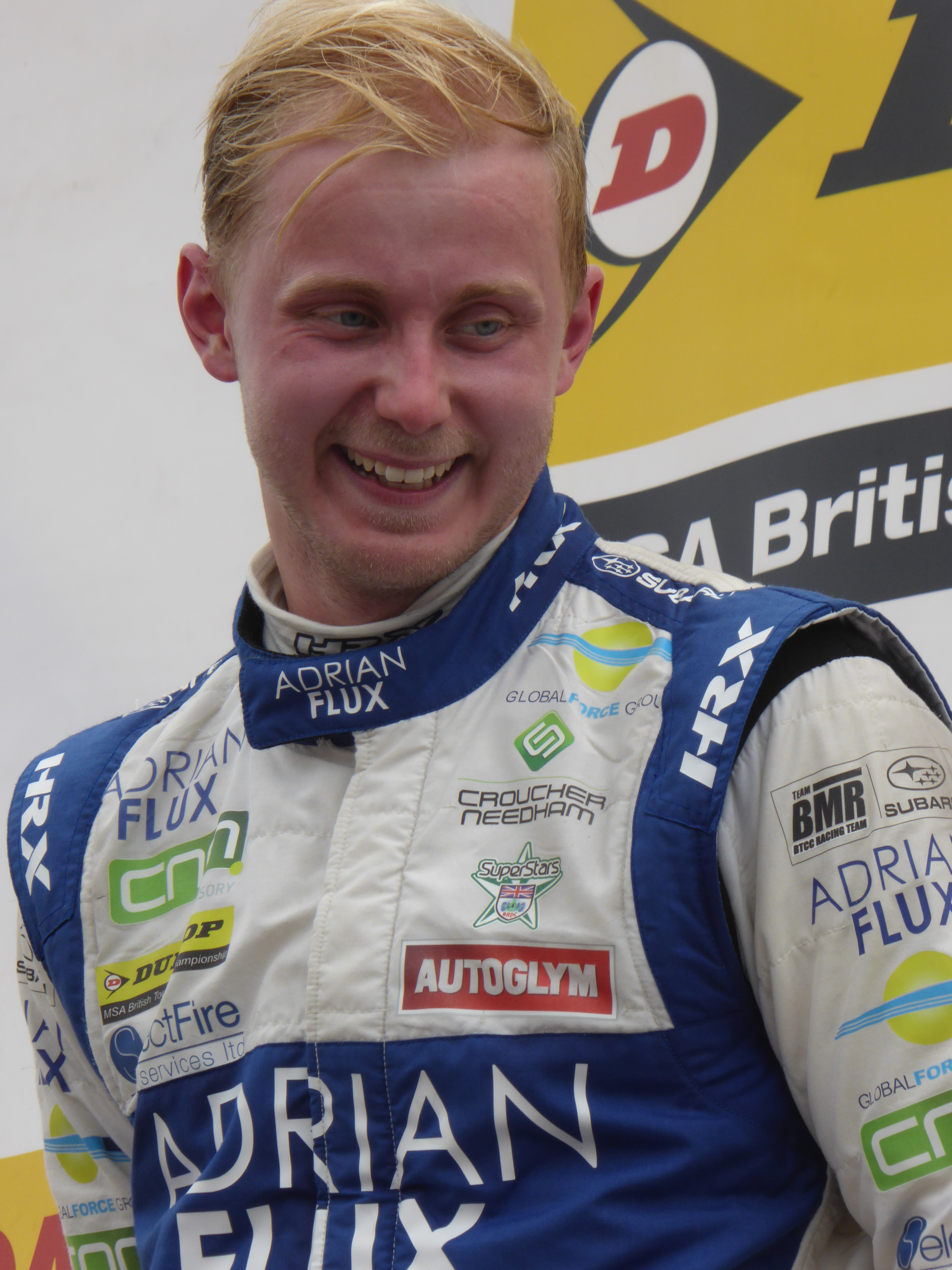
- Sutton in 2017
- Nationality: (United Kingdom) British
- Born: Ashley John Sutton; 15 January 1994 (age 32) Bishops Stortford, Hertfordshire, England

British Touring Car Championship career
- Debut season: 2016
- Current team: NAPA Racing UK
- Categorisation: FIA Gold
- Car number: 116
- Former teams: MG Racing RCIB Insurance; Adrian Flux Subaru Racing; Laser Tools Racing
- Starts: 327
- Wins: 56
- Poles: 15
- Fastest laps: 67
- Best finish: 1st in 2017, 2020, 2021, 2023, 2026
- Finished last season: 2nd

Previous series
- 2015 2014 2010 2000-09: Renault Clio Cup United Kingdom; British Formula Ford Championship; 750MC Formula Vee; Karting

Championship titles
- 2017, 2020, 2021, 2023, 2026 2016 2015: British Touring Car Championship; Jack Sears Trophy; Renault Clio Cup United Kingdom

Awards
- 2023 2021: Goodyear Wingfoot Award; Autosport National Driver of the Year

Ashley John Sutton (born 15 January 1994) is a British racing driver who currently competes in the British Touring Car Championship with NAPA Racing UK, driving a Ford Focus Titanium Saloon. Sutton is the most successful driver in BTCC history, winning the championship on five occasions – 2017, 2020, 2021, 2023 and 2026.

After winning the Renault Clio Cup UK in 2015, Sutton moved up to the British Touring Car Championship for the 2016 season with MG Racing RCIB Insurance. He won one race in his début season, before moving to Adrian Flux Subaru Racing for the 2017 season. Sutton failed to score a point in the opening meeting, but won six races thereafter to win the championship, the youngest champion since 1966. He moved to Laser Tools Racing in 2020, and would win the championship back to back in 2020 and 2021. He moved to NAPA Racing UK for the 2022 season and won the championship for a fourth time in 2023. He also scored 12 Wins in 2023, equalling Alain Menu's 1997 record. He was also the first driver since Menu in 2000 to win the BTCC title in a Ford.

== Racing career ==
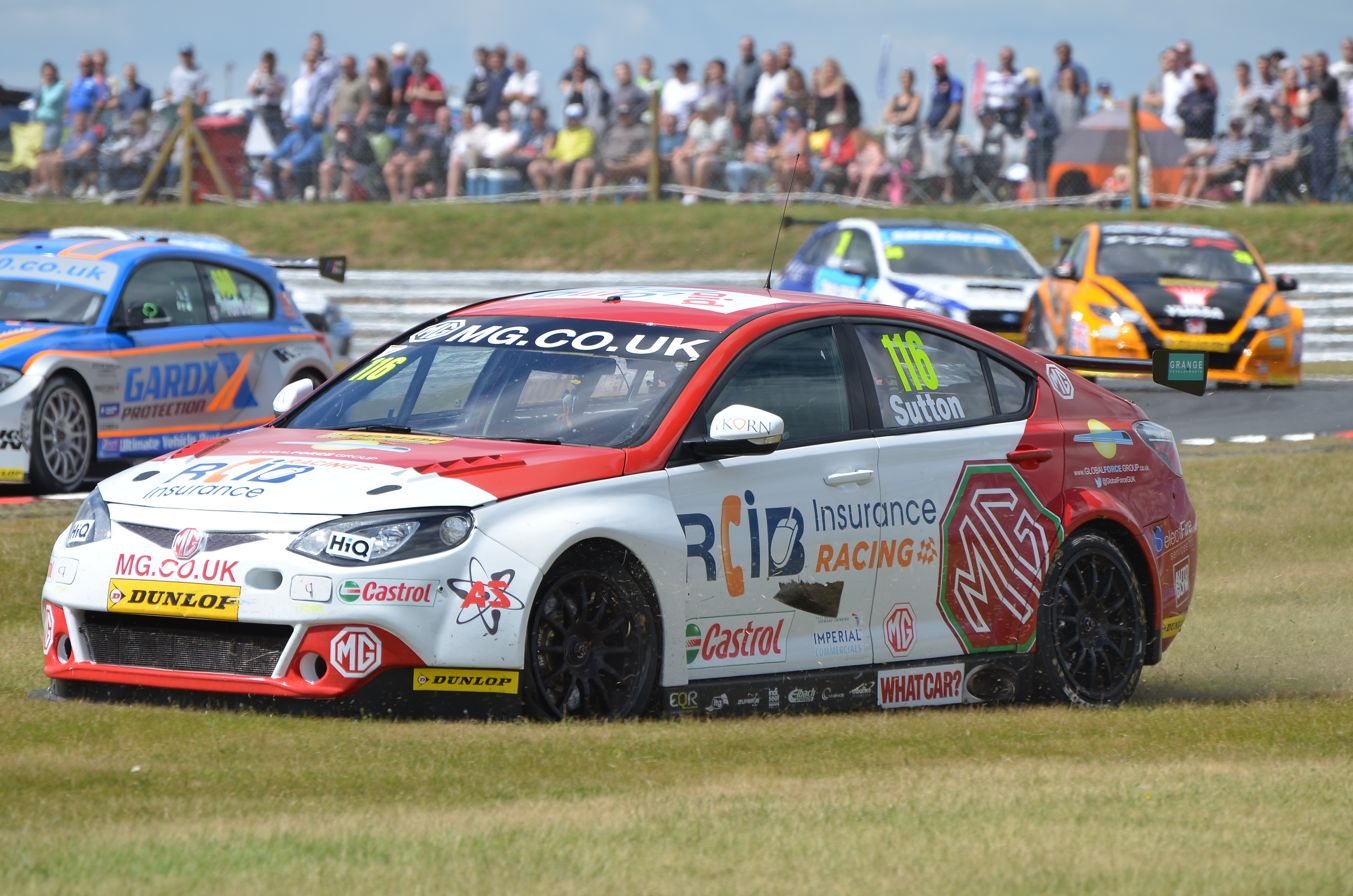
Sutton takes to the grass at Snetterton in 2016.

Sutton began his career in karting in 2000 and raced in karting up until 2009, when he switched to the 750MC Formula Vee Championship. He went on to win the Rookie of year award that season, finishing fourth in the overall championship with assistance from an established two-car team (AMP). He made a return to racing in the 2014 British Formula Ford Championship after having been forced to sit out two and half years of racing, following a road car accident. He finished third in the championship that year, taking five wins, 16 podiums, four pole positions and ten fastest laps. For 2015, he switched to the Renault Clio Cup United Kingdom, entering the championship with support from the British Touring Car Championship team, Team BMR. Winning the championship that year, with six wins, 14 podiums, four pole positions and four fastest laps.

In March 2016, it was announced that Sutton would make his British Touring Car Championship debut with MG Racing RCIB Insurance driving a MG6 GT. He finished fourth in the first race of the season and took his first win in a wet race three at Croft. He also won the Jack Sears Trophy, awarded to the top performing rookie.

For 2017, Sutton moved back to Team BMR. He failed to score a point at the first round at Brands Hatch but since has taken wins at Oulton Park, Croft, Snetterton, Knockhill and Rockingham. He held a ten-point lead at the summit of the championship heading into the finale. Sutton clinched the title in the final race of the season after rival Turkington had earlier won the second race from 15th on the grid to keep the championship alive. However, on lap 2 of race three, Turkington was hit, therefore ending his chances and confirming Sutton as the champion, the youngest since John Fitzpatrick in 1966. During his title defence in 2018, Sutton won six races, the most of any driver during the season but came fourth overall.

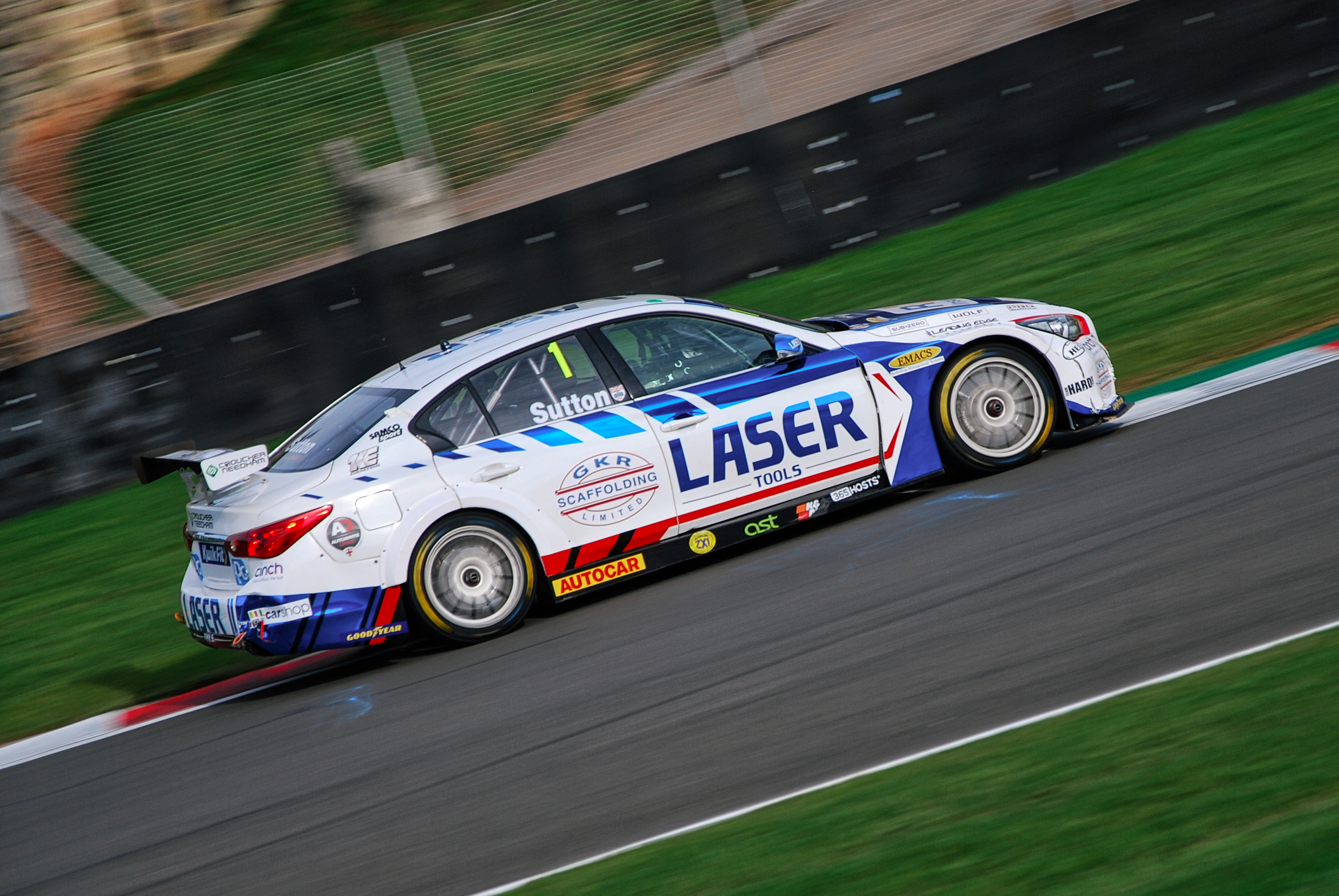
Sutton driving at Donington Park during the 2021 British Touring Car Championship.

Sutton competed in the inaugural season of the TCR UK series, winning two races of a truncated campaign with Verizon Connect Racing.

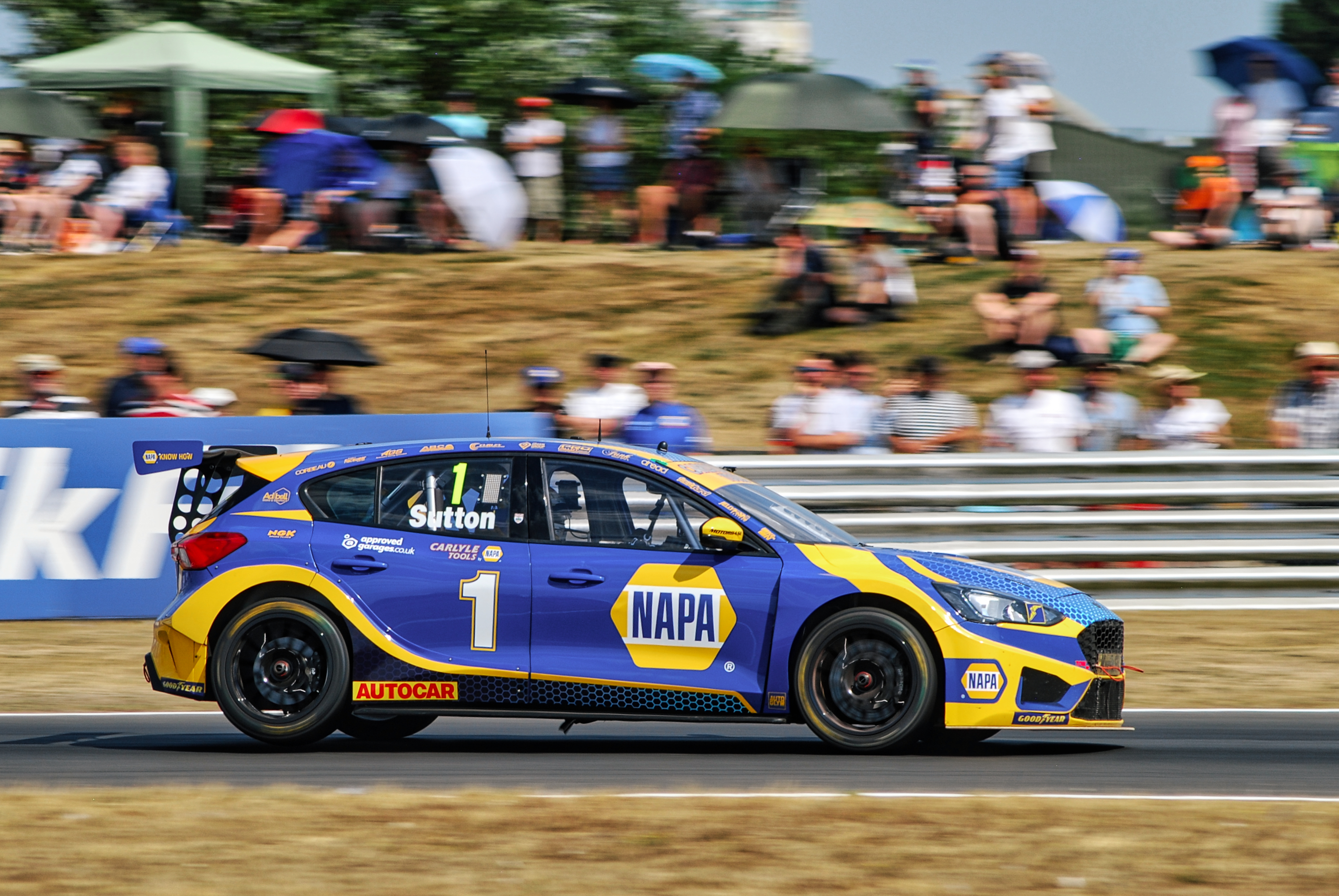
Sutton competing at Snetterton in 2022.

== Personal life ==
Sutton was educated at Birchwood High School, where he studied auto mechanics and engineering.

== Racing record ==
=== Racing career summary ===
Season	Series	Team	Races	Wins	Poles	F/Laps	Podiums	Points	Position
2010	750 Motor Club Formula Vee Championship		11	3	0	5	8	224	4th
2014	British Formula Ford Championship	Meridian Motorsport	26	5	4	10	16	567	**3rd**
2015	Renault UK Clio Cup	Team BMR Restart with Pyro	18	6	4	4	14	459	**1st**
2016	British Touring Car Championship	MG Racing RCIB Insurance	30	1	2	2	2	162	13th
2017	British Touring Car Championship	Adrian Flux Subaru Racing	30	6	1	4	15	372	**1st**
2018	British Touring Car Championship	Adrian Flux Subaru Racing	30	6	1	3	8	256	4th
2018	TCR UK Touring Car Championship	Verizon Connect Racing	2	2	1	1	2	91	13th
2018	TCR Europe Touring Car Series	WestCoast Racing	2	0	0	1	1	27	17th
2019	British Touring Car Championship	Adrian Flux Subaru Racing	30	1	1	1	6	233	8th
2019	TCR Europe Touring Car Series	Team WRT	2	0	0	0	0	29	24th
2020	British Touring Car Championship	Laser Tools Racing	27	5	1	10	10	350	**1st**
2021	British Touring Car Championship	Laser Tools Racing	30	5	1	5	9	357	**1st**
2022	British Touring Car Championship	NAPA Racing UK	30	3	0	4	12	382	**2nd**
2023	British Touring Car Championship	NAPA Racing UK	30	12	6	12	20	446	**1st**
2024	British Touring Car Championship	NAPA Racing UK	30	3	0	6	14	365	**3rd**
2025	British Touring Car Championship	NAPA Racing UK	30	5	1	7	17	428	**2nd**
2025	GT World Challenge Europe Endurance Cup - Bronze	Paradine Competition	1	0	0	0	0	8	32nd
2026	British Touring Car Championship	NAPA Racing UK	30	9	1	13	21	516	**1st**
2026	GT World Challenge Europe Endurance Cup - Gold	Paradine Competition	1	0	0	0	0	12	19th

^{*} Season still in progress.

=== 750MC Formula Vee ===
Ash Sutton started his car racing career in the 750 Motor Club's Formula Vee Championship driving a Storm. He finished fourth in the championship, taking three victories, coming at Castle Combe, Brands Hatch and Pembrey. He took a further five podiums.

=== Complete Renault UK Clio Cup results ===
(key) (Races in bold indicate pole position)

Year	Team	1	2	3	4	5	6	7	8	9	10	11	12	13	14	15	16	17	18	19	Pos	Pts
2015	Team BMR Restart with Pyro	BHI; 1 C	BHI; 2; 2	**DON**; **1**; 1	DON; 2; 7	DON; 3; 2	THR; 1; 2	THR; 2; 2	OUL; 1; 5	OUL; 2 Ret	CRO; 1; 1	CRO; 2; 2	KNO; 1; 2	KNO; 2; 3	ROC; 1; 1	ROC; 2; 5	**SIL**; **1**; 1	SIL; 2; 2	BRH; 1; 1	BRH; 2; 1	1st	459

=== Complete British Touring Car Championship results ===
(key) (Races in bold indicate pole position – 1 point awarded just in first race; races in italics indicate fastest lap – 1 point awarded all races; * signifies that driver led race for at least one lap – 1 point given all races; ^{Superscript} number indicates points-scoring qualifying race position)

Year	Team	Car	1	2	3	4	5	6	7	8	9	10	11	12	13	14	15	16	17	18	19	20	21	22	23	24	25	26	27	28	29	30	DC	Points
2016	MG Racing RCIB Insurance	MG 6 GT	BRH; 1; 4	BRH; 2; 6	BRH; 3; 10	**DON**; **1**; 5	DON; 2; 13	DON; 3; 5	THR; 1 Ret	THR; 2; 15	THR; 3; 5	OUL; 1; 19	OUL; 2; 27	OUL; 3; 12	CRO; 1; 3	CRO; 2; 5	CRO; 3; 1*	SNE; 1; 25	SNE; 2 Ret	SNE; 3; 14	KNO; 1; 11	KNO; 2 Ret	KNO; 3 Ret	ROC; 1; 6	ROC; 2; 5	ROC; 3; 19	**SIL**; **1** DSQ*	SIL; 2; 26	SIL; 3; 10	BRH; 1; 9	BRH; 2 Ret	BRH; 3; 24	13th	162
2017	Adrian Flux Subaru Racing	Subaru Levorg GT	BRH; 1; 16	BRH; 2 Ret	BRH; 3; 21	DON; 1; 13	DON; 2; 3	DON; 3; 3	THR; 1; 6	THR; 2; 8	THR; 3; 6	OUL; 1; 3	OUL; 2; 1*	OUL; 3; 4	**CRO**; **1**; 1*	**CRO**; **2**; 2	CRO; 3; 2	SNE; 1; 1*	**SNE**; **2**; 1*	SNE; 3 Ret	KNO; 1; 2	KNO; 2; 1*	KNO; 3; 4	ROC; 1; 2	ROC; 2; 1*	ROC; 3; 5	SIL; 1; 5	SIL; 2; 4	SIL; 3; 11	BRH; 1; 3	BRH; 2; 12	BRH; 3; 3	1st	372
2018	Adrian Flux Subaru Racing	Subaru Levorg GT	BRH; 1; 7	BRH; 2; 12	BRH; 3; 4	DON; 1; 12	DON; 2; 8	DON; 3; 6*	THR; 1; 15	THR; 2; 11	THR; 3; 20	OUL; 1; 21	OUL; 2; 23	OUL; 3; 13	**CRO**; **1**; 1*	**CRO**; **2**; 1*	CRO; 3; 7	SNE; 1; 2	SNE; 2; 1*	SNE; 3; 10	ROC; 1; 2	ROC; 2; 1*	ROC; 3; 17	KNO; 1; 1*	**KNO**; **2** DSQ	KNO; 3; 8	SIL; 1; 11	SIL; 2; 27	SIL; 3; 12	BRH; 1 Ret	BRH; 2; 8	BRH; 3; 1*	4th	256
2019	Adrian Flux Subaru Racing	Subaru Levorg GT	**BRH**; **1**; 9*	BRH; 2; 2*	BRH; 3; 25	DON; 1; 2	DON; 2; 3	DON; 3; 5	THR; 1; 9	THR; 2; 11	**THR**; **3**; 3	CRO; 1; 7	CRO; 2; 5	CRO; 3; 4	OUL; 1; 8	OUL; 2; 16	OUL; 3; 7	SNE; 1; 12	SNE; 2; 7	SNE; 3; 20	THR; 1; 9	THR; 2; 11	THR; 3; 9	KNO; 1 Ret	KNO; 2; 16	KNO; 3; 12	SIL; 1; 24	SIL; 2; 11	**SIL**; **3**; 15*	BRH; 1; 11	BRH; 2; 1*	BRH; 3; 3	8th	233
2020	Laser Tools Racing	Infiniti Q50	DON; 1; 14	DON; 2; 5	DON; 3; 1*	BRH; 1; 6	BRH; 2; 3	BRH; 3; 2	OUL; 1; 8	OUL; 2; 1*	OUL; 3; 4	**KNO**; **1**; 1*	**KNO**; **2**; 1*	KNO; 3; 11	THR; 1; 5	THR; 2; 4	THR; 3; 4	SIL; 1; 5	SIL; 2; 26	SIL; 3; 3	CRO; 1; 4	CRO; 2; 20	CRO; 3; 5	SNE; 1; 5	SNE; 2; 3	SNE; 3; 4	BRH; 1; 2	BRH; 2; 1*	BRH; 3; 6				1st	350
2021	Laser Tools Racing	Infiniti Q50	**THR**; **1**; 9	THR; 2; 9	THR; 3; 1*	SNE; 1; 11	SNE; 2; 1*	SNE; 3; 2	BRH; 1; 5	BRH; 2; 2	BRH; 3; 8	OUL; 1; 14	OUL; 2; 8	OUL; 3 Ret	KNO; 1; 4	KNO; 2; 1*	KNO; 3; 5	THR; 1; 5	THR; 2; 1*	THR; 3; 10	CRO; 1; 6	CRO; 2; 5	CRO; 3; 3	SIL; 1; 7	SIL; 2; 4	SIL; 3; 3	DON; 1; 7	DON; 2; 4	DON; 3; 8	BRH; 1; 6	BRH; 2; 6	BRH; 3; 1*	1st	357
2022	NAPA Racing UK	Ford Focus ST	DON; 1; 4	DON; 2; 6	DON; 3; 2	BRH; 1; 9	BRH; 2; 4	BRH; 3; 6	THR; 1; 3	THR; 2; 3	THR; 3; 3	OUL; 1; 2	OUL; 2; 2	OUL; 3; 16	CRO; 1; 6	CRO; 2; 6	CRO; 3 NC	KNO; 1; 2*	KNO; 2; 1*	KNO; 3; 5	SNE; 1; 9	SNE; 2; 9	**SNE**; **3**; 1*	THR; 1; 3	THR; 2; 1*	THR; 3; 5	SIL; 1; 6	SIL; 2; 4	SIL; 3; 2	BRH; 1; 4	BRH; 2; 5	BRH; 3; 4	2nd	382
2023	NAPA Racing UK	Ford Focus ST	DON; 1 Ret	DON; 2; 15	DON; 3; 3	BRH; 1; 2	BRH; 2; 1*	BRH; 3; 1*	**SNE**; **1**; 1*	**SNE**; **2**; 1*	SNE; 3; 4	**THR**; **1**; 1*	**THR**; **2**; 1*	THR; 3; 12	**OUL**; **1**; 2	OUL; 2; 2	OUL; 3 Ret	CRO; 1; 2	CRO; 2; 1*	CRO; 3 Ret	**KNO**; **1**; 6*	KNO; 2; 2	KNO; 3; 1*	**DON**; **1**; 1*	**DON**; **2**; 2*	DON; 3; 5	SIL; 1; 23	SIL; 2; 1*	SIL; 3; 3	**BRH**; **1**; 1*	**BRH**; **2**; 1*	BRH; 3; 13	1st	446
2024	NAPA Racing UK	Ford Focus ST	DON; 1; 2	DON; 2; 2	DON; 3; 3	BRH; 1; 3	BRH; 2; 3	BRH; 3; 3	SNE; 1; 3	SNE; 2; 20	SNE; 3; 5	THR; 1; 3	THR; 2; 5	THR; 3; 1*	OUL; 1; 2	OUL; 2; 16	OUL; 3; 18	CRO; 1; 4	CRO; 2; 5	CRO; 3; 4	KNO; 1; 6	KNO; 2; 5	KNO; 3; 4	DON; 1; 2	DON; 2; 1*	DON; 3 NC	SIL; 1; 4	SIL; 2; 12	SIL; 3; 2	BRH; 1 Ret	BRH; 2; 5	BRH; 3; 1*	3rd	365
2025	NAPA Racing UK	Ford Focus ST	DON; 1; 1*	**DON**; **2**; 1*	DON; 3; 3	BRH; 1; 10	BRH; 2; 3	BRH; 3; 4	SNE; 1; 3	SNE; 2; 10*	SNE; 3; 2	**THR**; **1**; 4*	THR; 2; 1*	THR; 3; 5	OUL; 1; 4	OUL; 2; 1*	OUL; 3; 2	CRO; 1; 20	CRO; 2; 5	CRO; 3; 1*	KNO; 1; 7	KNO; 2; 2	KNO; 3; 3	DON; 1; 4	DON; 2; 8	**DON**; **3**; 2*	SIL; 1; 8	SIL; 2; 2	SIL; 3; 3	BRH; 1; 9	BRH; 2; 2	BRH; 3; 2	2nd	428
2026	NAPA Racing UK	Ford Focus Titanium Saloon	DON; 1; 2	DON; 2; 1*	DON; 3; 1*	**BRH**; **1**; 1*^{1}	**BRH**; **2**; 2*	BRH; 3; 2	SNE; 1; 10	SNE; 2; 1*	SNE; 3; 2	OUL; 1; 7^{3}	OUL; 2; 1*	OUL; 3; 9	THR; 1; 2^{3}	THR; 2; 1*	THR; 3; 2	KNO; 1; 4^{11}	KNO; 2; 1*	KNO; 3; 12	DON; 1; 2^{4}	DON; 2; 2*	DON; 3; 8	CRO; 1; 2^{3}	CRO; 2; 1*	CRO; 3 Ret	SIL; 1; 12^{14}	SIL; 2; 1*	SIL; 3; 2	BRH; 1; 5^{11}	BRH; 2; 3	BRH; 3; 2	1st	516

=== Complete TCR Europe Touring Car Series results ===
(key) (Races in bold indicate pole position) (Races in italics indicate fastest lap)

Year	Team	Car	1	2	3	4	5	6	7	8	9	10	11	12	13	14	DC	Points
2018	WestCoast Racing	Volkswagen Golf GTI TCR	LEC; 1	LEC; 2	ZAN; 1	ZAN; 2	SPA; 1	SPA; 2	HUN; 1	HUN; 2	ASS; 1	ASS; 2	MNZ; 1	MNZ; 2	CAT; 1; 4	CAT; 2; 3	17th	27
2019	Team WRT	Volkswagen Golf GTI TCR	HUN; 1	HUN; 2	HOC; 1	HOC; 2	SPA; 1; 19	SPA; 2; 4	RBR; 1	RBR; 2	OSC; 1	OSC; 2	CAT; 1	CAT; 2	MNZ; 1	MNZ; 2	24th	29

=== Complete GT World Challenge Europe results ===
==== GT World Challenge Europe Endurance Cup ====
(key) (Races in bold indicate pole position) (Races in italics indicate fastest lap)

Year	Team	Car	Class	1	2	3	4	5	6	7	Pos.	Points
2025	Paradine Competition	BMW M4 GT3 Evo	Bronze	LEC	MNZ; 25	SPA; 6H	SPA; 12H	SPA; 24H	NÜR	CAT	32nd	8
2026	Paradine Competition	BMW M4 GT3 Evo	Gold	LEC; 24	MNZ	SPA; 6H	SPA; 12H	SPA; 24H	NÜR	ALG	19th	12

Sporting positions
Preceded by Mike Bushell	Renault Clio Cup United Kingdom; Champion; 2015	Succeeded by Ant Whorton-Eales
Preceded by Josh Cook	Jack Sears Trophy; Winner; 2016	Succeeded by Senna Proctor
Preceded by Gordon Shedden	British Touring Car Championship; Champion; 2017	Succeeded by Colin Turkington
Preceded by Colin Turkington	British Touring Car Championship; Champion; 2020-2021	Succeeded by Tom Ingram
Preceded by Rory Butcher	British Touring Car Championship; Independents' Trophy Winner; 2020-2021	Succeeded by Josh Cook
Preceded by Tom Ingram	British Touring Car Championship; Champion; 2023	Succeeded by Jake Hill
Preceded by Tom Ingram	British Touring Car Championship; Champion; 2026	Succeeded by Incumbent
Awards and achievements
Preceded by Harry King	Autosport Awards; National Driver of the Year; 2021	Succeeded by Tom Ingram
Preceded by Jake Hill	Goodyear Wingfoot Award; Winner; 2023	Succeeded by Colin Turkington
