= 2024 Clio Cup Great Britain =

Motor racing series running Renault Clio cars

The 2024 Clio Cup Great Britain was the return of Renault's Clio Cup racing around the United Kingdom. The season was the first, and only as of 2026, after the revival by MotorSport Vision, following its axing by TOCA in 2019.

== Teams and drivers ==
Team	No.	Driver	Rounds
Graves Motorsport	17	(United Kingdom) Nicky Taylor	All
Graves Motorsport	57	(United Kingdom) Ainsley Bird	6
Westbourne Motorsport	21	(United Kingdom) James Colburn	6
Westbourne Motorsport	22	(Republic of Ireland) Daire Flock	All
Westbourne Motorsport	29	(United Kingdom) Leonardo Panayiotou	1, 3
Westbourne Motorsport	46	(United Kingdom) Jack Wright	4
Westbourne Motorsport	55	(United Kingdom) Ben Colburn	All
Westbourne Motorsport	77	(Australia) Jeremy Evans	2
Apple Car Centre	44	(United Kingdom) Ray Honeybone	1, 3
Team Norfolk	53	(United Kingdom) Kevin Stirling	1, 3
LDR Performance Tuning	71	(United Kingdom) Harvey Riby	6
LDR Performance Tuning	98	(United Kingdom) Will Orton	4
LDR Performance Tuning	99	(United Kingdom) Ben Jenkins	2–6
Finsport	166	(United Kingdom) Richard Clarke	1, 3, 6

== Calendar ==
Round		Circuit	Date
1	R1	Brands Hatch GP	31 May–1 June
1	R2	Brands Hatch GP	31 May–1 June
2	R3	Anglesey Circuit	12–13 July
2	R4	Anglesey Circuit	12–13 July
3	R5	Snetterton Motor Racing Circuit	10–11 August
3	R6	Snetterton Motor Racing Circuit	10–11 August
4	R7	Donington Park GP	13–14 September
4	R8	Donington Park GP	13–14 September
5	R9	Oulton Park	27–28 September
5	R10	Oulton Park	27–28 September
6	R11	Brands Hatch Indy	25–26 October
6	R12	Brands Hatch Indy	25–26 October

== Race results ==
Round		Circuit	Pole position	Fastest lap	Winning driver	Winning team
1	R1	Brands Hatch GP	(Republic of Ireland) Daire Flock	(United Kingdom) Ben Colburn	(United Kingdom) Nicky Taylor	(United Kingdom) Graves Motorsport
1	R2	Brands Hatch GP	(United Kingdom) Ben Colburn	(Republic of Ireland) Daire Flock	(United Kingdom) Ben Colburn	(United Kingdom) Westbourne Motorsport
2	R3	Anglesey Circuit	(United Kingdom) Ben Colburn	(Republic of Ireland) Daire Flock	(United Kingdom) Ben Colburn	(United Kingdom) Westbourne Motorsport
2	R4	Anglesey Circuit	(United Kingdom) Ben Colburn	(Republic of Ireland) Daire Flock	(Republic of Ireland) Daire Flock	(United Kingdom) Westbourne Motorsport
3	R5	Snetterton Motor Racing Circuit	(United Kingdom) Ben Colburn	(United Kingdom) Ray Honeybone	(United Kingdom) Ben Colburn	(United Kingdom) Westbourne Motorsport
3	R6	Snetterton Motor Racing Circuit	(Republic of Ireland) Daire Flock	(United Kingdom) Ray Honeybone	(United Kingdom) Nicky Taylor	(United Kingdom) Graves Motorsport
4	R7	Donington Park GP	(United Kingdom) Will Orton	(United Kingdom) Will Orton	(United Kingdom) Will Orton	(United Kingdom) LDR Performance Tuning
4	R8	Donington Park GP	(United Kingdom) Will Orton	(Republic of Ireland) Daire Flock	(United Kingdom) Will Orton	(United Kingdom) LDR Performance Tuning
5	R9	Oulton Park	(United Kingdom) Nicky Taylor	(United Kingdom) Nicky Taylor	(United Kingdom) Ben Colburn	(United Kingdom) Westbourne Motorsport
5	R10	Oulton Park	(United Kingdom) Ben Colburn	(Republic of Ireland) Daire Flock	(United Kingdom) Nicky Taylor	(United Kingdom) Graves Motorsport
6	R11	Brands Hatch Indy	(United Kingdom) Ben Colburn	(Republic of Ireland) Daire Flock	(Republic of Ireland) Daire Flock	(United Kingdom) Westbourne Motorsport
6	R12	Brands Hatch Indy	(United Kingdom) Ben Colburn	(United Kingdom) James Colburn	(Republic of Ireland) Daire Flock	(United Kingdom) Westbourne Motorsport

== Championship standings ==
=== Points system ===
Points system
Races	1st	2nd	3rd	4th	5th	6th	7th	8th	9th	10th	11th	12th	13th	14th	15th	16th	17th	18th	19th	20th	Fastest lap	Lead laps in race
Races	50	42	36	33	30	27	24	22	20	18	16	14	12	10	8	6	4	3	2	1	2	1

All drivers had their worst result dropped, but not from the last 2 races. Disqualifications also could not count to drop score.

==== Drivers' Standings ====
Pos	Driver	BHGP		ANG		SNE		DON		OUL		BHI		Pts
Pos	Driver	R1	R2	R3	R4	R5	R6	R7	R8	R9	R10	R11	R12	Pts
1	(United Kingdom) Nicky Taylor	1	(3)	2	3	3	1	2	2	2	1	2	2	499
2	(Republic of Ireland) Daire Flock	2	2	3	1	2	3	3	3	(3)	2	1	1	490
3	(United Kingdom) Ben Colburn	3	1	1	2	1	2	5	4	1	(Ret)	Ret	Ret	399
4	(United Kingdom) Ben Jenkins			4	4	5	4	4	5	4	3	5	5	330
5	(United Kingdom) James Colburn											3	3	74
6	(United Kingdom) Harvey Riby											4	4	66
7	(United Kingdom) Jack Wright							6	6					60
8	(Australia) Jeremy Evans			5	5									60
9	(United Kingdom) Ainsley Bird											6	6	54
Drivers ineligible for championship points
-	(United Kingdom) Will Orton							1	1					-
-	(United Kingdom) Ray Honeybone	5	4			4	5							-
-	(United Kingdom) Leonardo Panayiotou	4	5											-
-	(United Kingdom) Kevin Stirling	6	6			Ret	WD							-
-	(United Kingdom) Richard Clarke	WD	WD			6	WD					WD	WD	-
Pos	Driver	BHGP		ANG		SNE		DON		OUL		BHI		Pts
