= Mike Bushell (racing driver) =

British racing driver (born 1989)

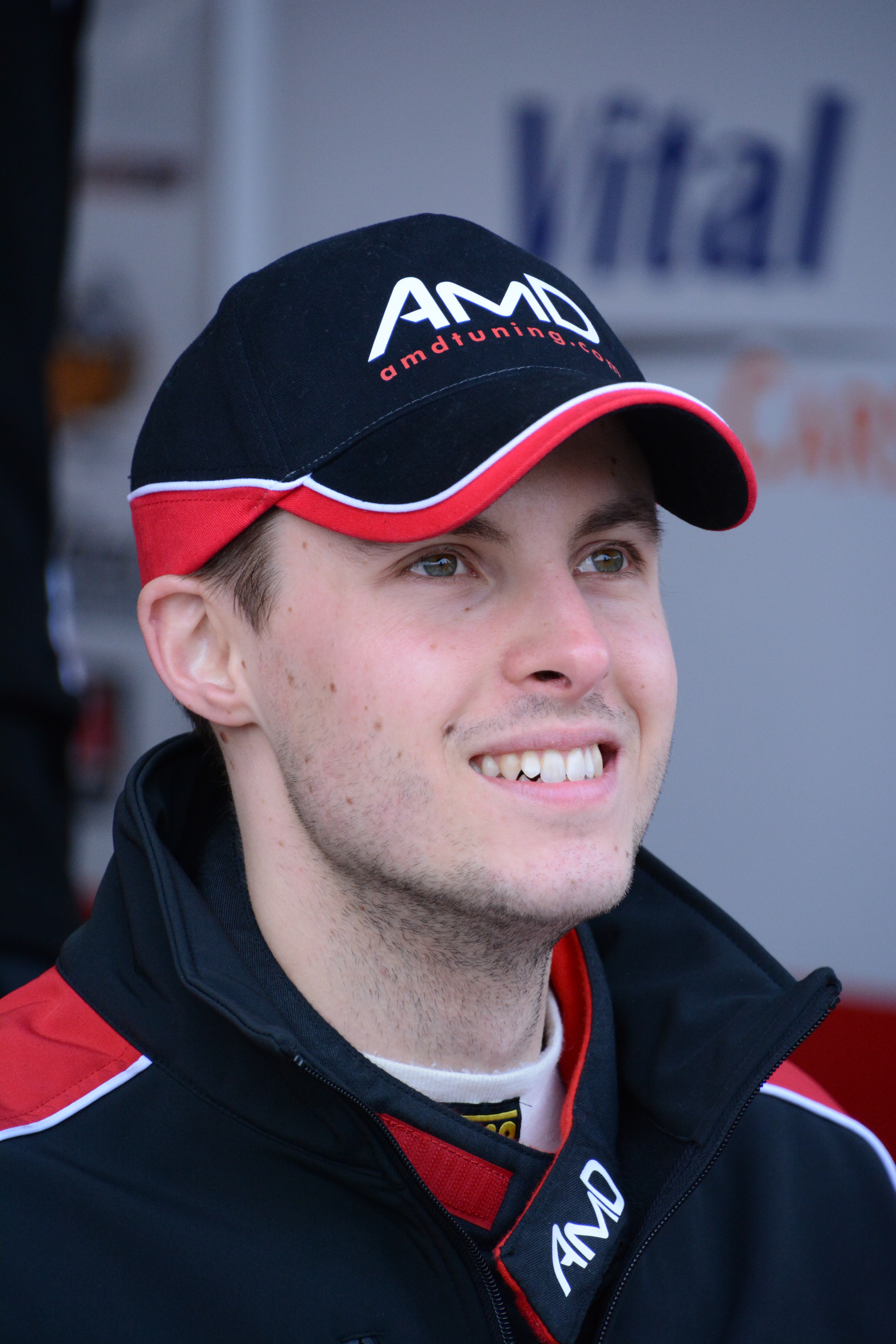
- Bushell at Brands Hatch during the 2015 British Touring Car Championship season
- Nationality: (United Kingdom) British
- Born: 5 July 1989 (age 37) Tunbridge Wells, Kent, UK

British Touring Car Championship career
- Debut season: 2013
- Current team: RCIB Insurance with Fox Transport
- Car number: 21
- Former teams: Cobra Sport AmD AutoAid/RCIB Insurance, Team Club 44, Power Maxed Car Care Racing
- Starts: 77
- Wins: 0
- Poles: 0
- Fastest laps: 1
- Best finish: 23rd in 2015
- Finished last season: 27th

Previous series
- 2016–2017, 2012–2014 2011: Renault Clio Cup United Kingdom Ford Fiesta ST Championship

Championship titles
- 2017, 2014: Renault Clio Cup United Kingdom

Mike Bushell (born 5 July 1989) is a British racing driver. In 2013, Bushell competed in the British Touring Car Championship for the first time, driving for IP Tech Race Engineering in their Chevrolet Cruze NGTC car at Knockhill in place of Andy Neate. He returned to the series in 2015 with AmD Tuning, after winning the Renault Clio Cup United Kingdom in 2014.

Bushell has since returned to the Renault Clio Cup United Kingdom for 2016 after failing to secure raise the budget needed to retain a seat in the British Touring Car Championship.

Alongside racing, Bushell is a keen programmer and is developing solo the upcoming title ARENA 3D, which is set to be released via the Steam Store in 2017.

== Racing career ==
Bushell began his racing career in 2004 in karting, with his father stepping aside after winning a British Endurance Karting title. These early years were spent competing at club level with the occasional entry into national level events.

In 2011, Bushell moved to circuit racing and competed in five rounds of the UK Ford Fiesta Championship, with a first ever podium achieved at the final round at Brands Hatch.

Bushell entered as a privateer in 2012 for the Renault Clio Cup United Kingdom under MBR (Mike Bushell Racing). Results were difficult to come by with limited circuit racing experience and lack of knowledge with car set up in such a competitive series. A move to Westbourne Motorsport for the final round at Brands Hatch resulted in 2nd place and fastest lap after an intense race for the lead in the wet with series ace Stefan Hodgetts.

Returning to the Renault Clio Cup United Kingdom for 2013, the season continued with Westbourne Motorsport and Bushell achieved his first pole position in the series at the first round. This early showing of pace resulted in the KX Academy selecting Bushell to be part of their programme and subsequently moved to Scuderia Vittoria partnering long term rival Ant Whorton-Eales and Stefan Hodgetts. The partnership was short lived with differences of opinion and poor results. The contract was not renewed after its initial run of three races and Bushell switched to reigning champions Team Pyro for the final round, with an immediate return to the podium. Scoring more points than the eventual 2013 champion in the same team.

Bushell remained with Team Pyro for the 2014 season which was the first year to introduce the new Renault Clio Mk IV. After achieving his first win in the series at Thruxton, Bushell went on to win a total of four races and clinch the championship after a season long duel with Josh Cook.

AmD Tuning signed Bushell for the 2015 season. With limited testing due to a heart illness in early February and a small budget throughout the season, only a handful of points finishes were attained with a season best finish of 10th place at Snetterton. A heavy accident at Thruxton resulted in a dislocated hip and extensive repair bill, affecting the budget for the following season.

2016 brought about a return to the Renault Clio Cup United Kingdom with former team Team Pyro.

Bushell competed in the BTCC in 2018 for a second full season, being more successful in the championship than the previous year, scoring 59 points. In 2019, Bushell left the team which allowed Jack Goff to continue in the series. After Sam Tordoff left the championship in 2019, Bushell took his spot in a Honda Civic Type R, driving for Cobra Sport AmD AutoAid/RCIB Insurance. Bushell will return to Team HARD for the 2020 season.

== Racing record ==
=== Complete British Touring Car Championship results ===
(key) (Races in bold indicate pole position – 1 point awarded just in first race; races in italics indicate fastest lap – 1 point awarded all races; * signifies that driver led race for at least one lap – 1 point given all races)

Year	Team	Car	1	2	3	4	5	6	7	8	9	10	11	12	13	14	15	16	17	18	19	20	21	22	23	24	25	26	27	28	29	30	DC	Pts
2013	Team Club 44	Chevrolet Cruze	BRH; 1	BRH; 2	BRH; 3	DON; 1	DON; 2	DON; 3	THR; 1	THR; 2	THR; 3	OUL; 1	OUL; 2	OUL; 3	CRO; 1	CRO; 2	CRO; 3	SNE; 1	SNE; 2	SNE; 3	KNO; 1; 18	KNO; 2; 17	KNO; 3 Ret	ROC; 1	ROC; 2	ROC; 3	SIL; 1	SIL; 2	SIL; 3	BRH; 1	BRH; 2	BRH; 3	36th	0
2015	AmD Tuning	Ford Focus ST	BRH; 1; 21	BRH; 2; 17	BRH; 3; 11	DON; 1 Ret	DON; 2 NC	DON; 3; 21	THR; 1 DNS	THR; 2 DNS	THR; 3 DNS	OUL; 1; 24	OUL; 2; 22	OUL; 3 Ret	CRO; 1 Ret	CRO; 2; 19	CRO; 3 DNS	SNE; 1; 16	SNE; 2; 10	SNE; 3; 20	KNO; 1; 15	KNO; 2 Ret	KNO; 3; 18	ROC; 1; 15	ROC; 2; 21	ROC; 3 Ret	SIL; 1; 15	SIL; 2; 17	SIL; 3; 13	BRH; 1; 13	BRH; 2; 17	BRH; 3; 14	23rd	19
2018	Trade Price Cars with Brisky Racing	Volkswagen CC	BRH; 1 Ret	BRH; 2; 8	BRH; 3; 5	DON; 1; 27	DON; 2; 28	DON; 3; 15	THR; 1; 21	THR; 2 NC	THR; 3; 27	OUL; 1; 19	OUL; 2; 15	OUL; 3; 8	CRO; 1; 20	CRO; 2; 22	CRO; 3 Ret	SNE; 1 Ret	SNE; 2; 16	SNE; 3 Ret	ROC; 1; 6	ROC; 2; 6	ROC; 3; 20	KNO; 1; 23	KNO; 2 NC	KNO; 3; 24	SIL; 1; 7	SIL; 2; 24	SIL; 3; 13	BRH; 1; 24	BRH; 2; 20	BRH; 3; 15	24th	59
2019	Cobra Sport AmD AutoAid RCIB Insurance	Honda Civic Type R (FK2)	BRH; 1	BRH; 2	BRH; 3	DON; 1	DON; 2	DON; 3	THR; 1	THR; 2	THR; 3	CRO; 1	CRO; 2	CRO; 3	OUL; 1	OUL; 2	OUL; 3	SNE; 1	SNE; 2	SNE; 3	THR; 1	THR; 2	THR; 3	KNO; 1 Ret	KNO; 2 Ret	KNO; 3 Ret	SIL; 1; 7	SIL; 2; 9	SIL; 3; 17	BRH; 1; 6	BRH; 2; 18	BRH; 3; 16	24th	27
2020	Power Maxed Car Care Racing	Vauxhall Astra	DON; 1	DON; 2	DON; 3	BRH; 1	BRH; 2	BRH; 3	OUL; 1; 21	OUL; 2; 26	OUL; 3; 17	KNO; 1; 21	KNO; 2; 16	KNO; 3 Ret	THR; 1	THR; 2	THR; 3	SIL; 1	SIL; 2	SIL; 3													27th	1
2020	RCIB Insurance with Fox Transport	Volkswagen CC																			CRO; 1; 19	CRO; 2; 15	CRO; 3; 17	SNE; 1	SNE; 2	SNE; 3	BRH; 1	BRH; 2	BRH; 3				27th	1
