= Clio Cup Great Britain =

UK touring car racing motorsport category

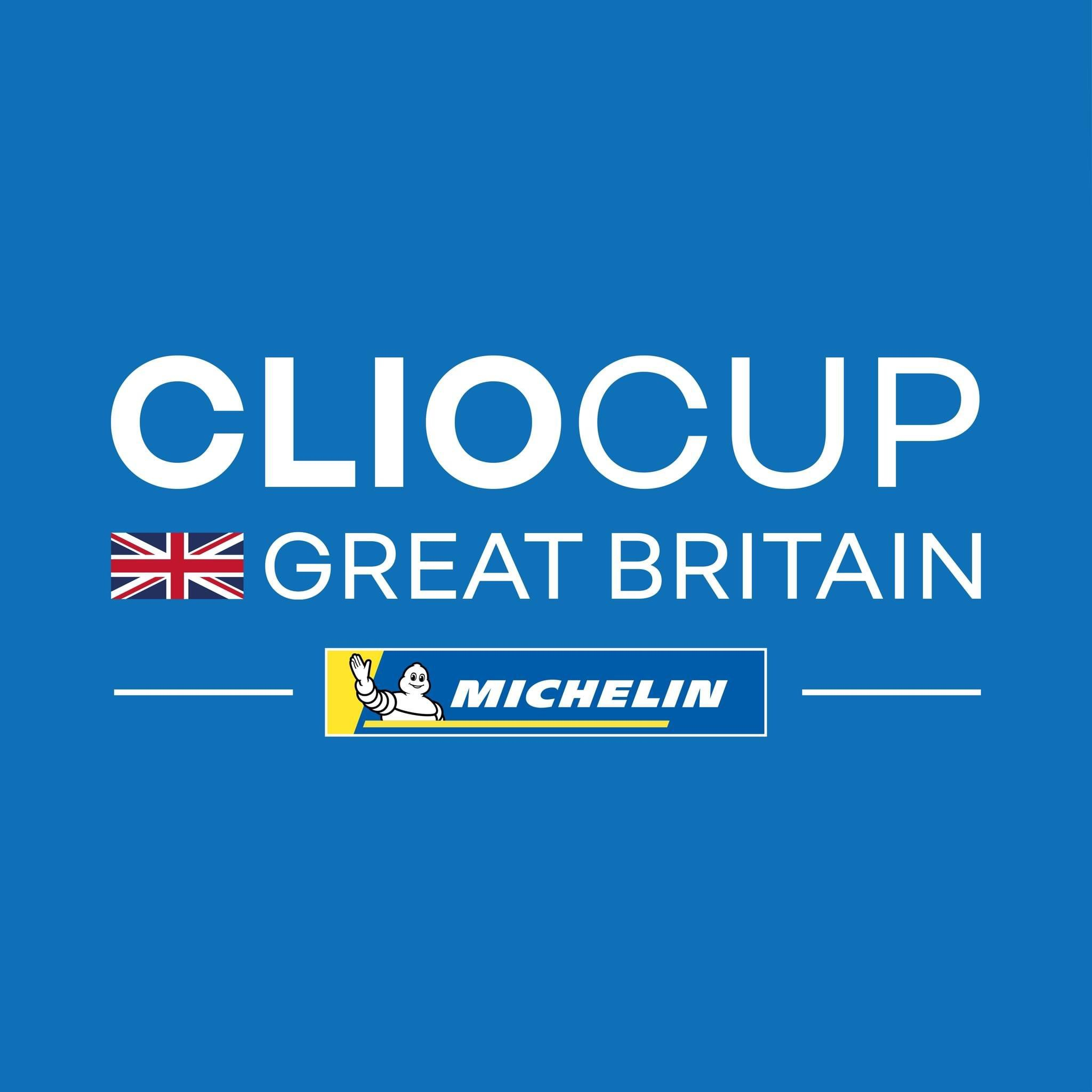
- Category: One-make racing by Renault (Renault Clio Cup)
- Country: United Kingdom
- Inaugural season: 1974
- Folded: 2019 (owned by TOCA); 2024 (owned by MSV)
- Classes: Main Class; Masters Cup; Rookie Cup
- Drivers: 7 (2024)
- Teams: 3 (2024)
- Constructors: Renault
- Tyre suppliers: Michelin
- Last Drivers' champion: (United Kingdom) Nicky Taylor (2024)
- Last Teams' champion: Graves Motorsport (2024)
- Official website: Clio Cup GB

Clio Cup Great Britain was an entry-level one-make touring car racing motorsport category, and the current name in the long history of Renault one-make cups in the UK. It currently attracts drivers from across the United Kingdom to compete along with several drivers for European countries. The current 2024 Champion is Nicky Taylor. The championship has been run to various regulations over the years, and can trace its history back to 1974. Several former drivers have become successful in other Touring car racing formulae, including Andy Priaulx, who went on to become multiple World Touring Car Championship champion and Jason Plato who is multiple British Touring Car Championship champion. The championship formerly ran on the support package of the British Touring Car Championship. The series was most recently promoted by the British Automobile Racing Club, which was also the promoter from 1974 to 2011. Prior to this, SRO promoted the series in 2012.

The UK Clio Cup folded after the 2019 season after being axed as a British Touring Car Championship support series in favour of the Mini Challenge. Clio Cup Great Britain was revived in 2024, organised by MotorSport Vision as an independent championship.

== History ==
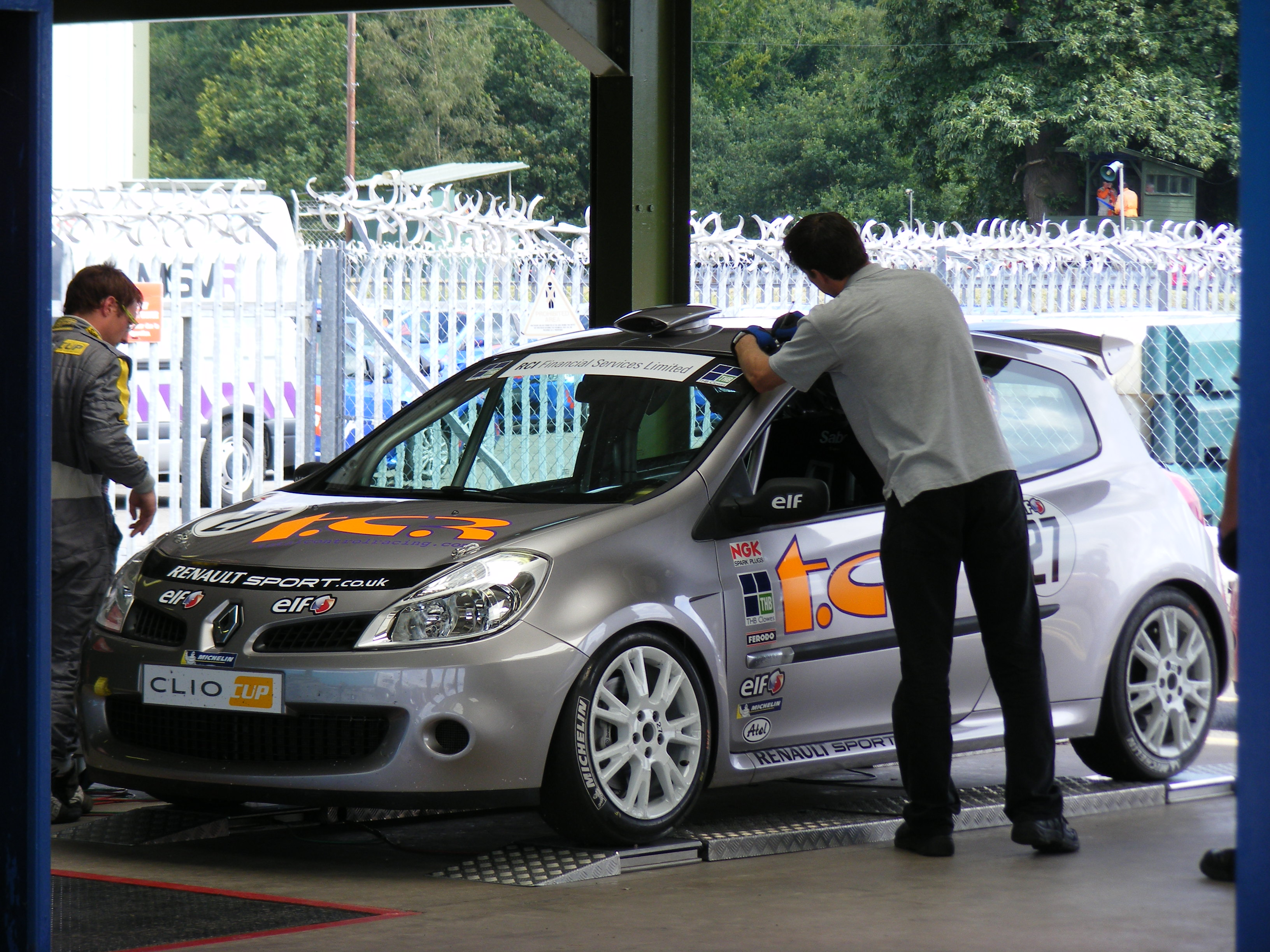
A Clio Renaultsport 197, used between 2007 and 2009

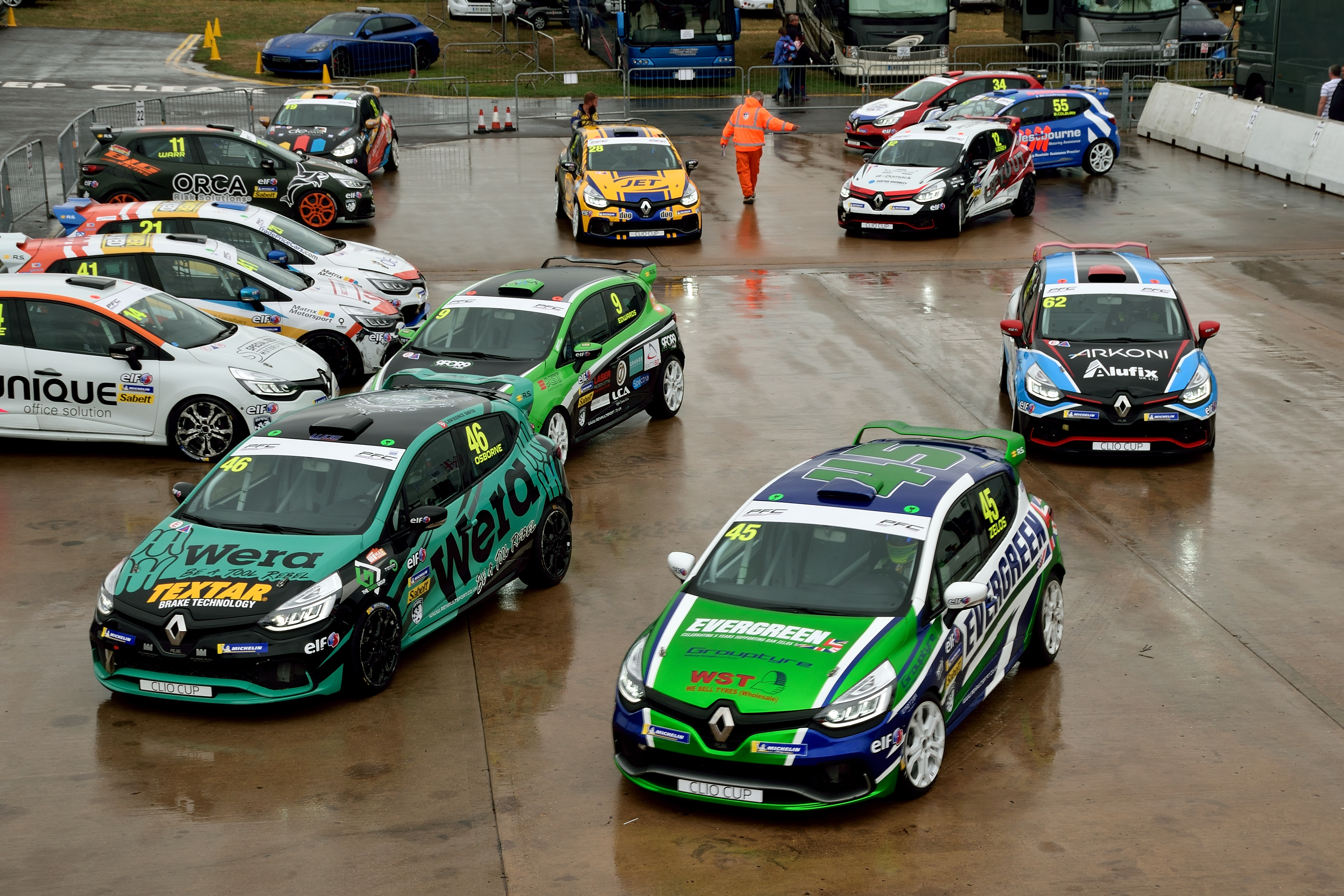
Clio Cup paddock at Rockingham in 2018.

Renault have a long history of One-make racing in the UK and the series can trace its root back as far as 1974, when drivers competed in Renault 5 TL's. The championship continued with various other models of the Renault 5 including the Renault 5 TS between 1978?–1979? and the Renault 5 GT Turbo between 1987?–1990. When the Renault 5 was replaced with the Mark I Renault Clio, the championship switched too, using the Mark I between 1991 and 1995. The Renault Sport Spider roadster was used between 1996 and 1999 before returning to the Clio, this time utilizing the newer Renault Sport versions. In 2000 and 2001, the series used the Clio Renaultsport 172, followed by the Clio Renaultsport 182 between 2002 and 2006. Between 2007 and 2009, the Clio Renaultsport 197 was used. This was replaced partway through the 2009 season with the latest Clio Renaultsport 200, which is currently used. However, from the 2014 season, the new Clio Renaultsport 200 Turbo race car will be used for the British championship.

Historically, the championship has been run using the tires from the French manufacturer Michelin. However, from 2013, tires for the championship will be supplied be Dunlop who also supply tires to other championships on the TOCA package, including the British Touring Car Championship

The series' past champion winners includes Andy Priaulx, Jason Plato and Tom Onslow-Cole. Other than that, past drivers of the series that were notable outside of racing were Andrew Ridgeley of the pop group Wham! in 1985 and it introduced actor Rowan Atkinson to motorsport, which he raced seldom between 1984 and 1990. One of his races was documented for his one-off show, Driven Man. The car has since re-emerged for a reunion race in 2004, which he aimed to compete in, but had to be substituted by Perry McCarthy, due to illness. Atkinson bought the car following the race and was auctioned off in a Bonhams auction in 2005.

== Championship format ==
The championship currently has 16 races held at eight double header rounds at circuits across England. The series supports the British Touring Car Championship at eight of its ten rounds. In 2012, Brands Hatch held two rounds of the championship, whilst Donington Park, Thruxton, Oulton Park, Snetterton, Rockingham and Sliverstone each held one round. In the past, the series has also formed part of the support package for the British rounds of the World Series by Renault.

On a race weekend, the drivers have a 30-minute qualifying session, with the fastest times setting the grid for race one and their second fastest times setting the race 2 grid. Races are held over a minimum of 30 miles.

=== Current points system ===
Points are awarded to the top 20 drivers in each race as well as the driver(s) setting the fastest lap using the following system:

Current points system.
| 1st | 2nd | 3rd | 4th | 5th | 6th | 7th | 8th | 9th | 10th | 11th | 12th | 13th | 14th | 15th | 16th | 17th | 18th | 19th | 20th | Fastest lap |
| 50 | 42 | 36 | 33 | 30 | 27 | 24 | 22 | 20 | 18 | 16 | 14 | 12 | 10 | 8 | 6 | 4 | 3 | 2 | 1 | 2 |

== Champions ==
| Season | Champion | Renault Model | Winter Series Champion |
|---|---|---|---|
| 1974 | (United Kingdom) Neil McGrath | Renault 5 TL | Not Held |
| 1975 | (United Kingdom) Neil McGrath | Renault 5 TL | Not Held |
| 1976 | (United Kingdom) Neil McGrath | Renault 5 TL | Not Held |
| 1977 | Not Held | | Not Held |
| 1978 | (United Kingdom) Neil McGrath | Renault 5 TS | Not Held |
| 1979 | (United Kingdom) Jim Edwards Sr. | Renault 5 TS | Not Held |
| 1980 | (United Kingdom) Rob Hall | Renault 5 TS | Not Held |
| 1981 | Not Held | | Not Held |
| 1982 | Not Held | | Not Held |
| 1983 | Not Held | | Not Held |
| 1984 | Not Held | | Not Held |
| 1985 | (United Kingdom) Rob Hall | Renault 5 GT Turbo | Not Held |
| 1986 | | Renault 5 GT Turbo | Not Held |
| 1987 | (United Kingdom) Barrie Wiliams | Renault 5 GT Turbo | Not Held |
| 1988 | | Renault 5 GT Turbo | Not Held |
| 1989 | | Renault 5 GT Turbo | Not Held |
| 1990 | (United Kingdom) Jim Edwards Jr. | Renault 5 GT Turbo | Not Held |
| 1991 | (United Kingdom) Steve Waudby | Renault Clio Mk.I | Not Held |
| 1992 | (United Kingdom) Matt Johnson | Renault Clio Mk.I | Not Held |
| 1993 | (United Kingdom) Alastair Lyall | Renault Clio Mk.I | Not Held |
| 1994 | (United Kingdom) John Bintcliffe | Renault Clio Mk.I | Not Held |
| 1995 | (United Kingdom) Lee Brookes | Renault Clio Mk.I | Not Held |
| 1996 | (United Kingdom) Jason Plato | Renault Sport Spider | Not Held |
| 1997 | (United Kingdom) Bryce Wilson | Renault Sport Spider | Not Held |
| 1998 | (United Kingdom) Dan Eaves | Renault Sport Spider | Not Held |
| 1999 | (United Kingdom) Andy Priaulx | Renault Sport Spider | Not Held |
| 2000 | (United Kingdom) Jim Edwards Jr. | Clio Renaultsport 172 | Not Held |
| 2001 | (United Kingdom) Daniel Buxton | Clio Renaultsport 172 | Not Held |
| 2002 | (United Kingdom) Paul Rivett | Clio Renaultsport 182 | (United Kingdom) Tom Ferrier |
| 2003 | (Republic of Ireland) Jonathan Fildes | Clio Renaultsport 182 | (United Kingdom) Paul Rivett |
| 2004 | (United Kingdom) Paul Rivett | Clio Renaultsport 182 | (United Kingdom) Jonathan Adam |
| 2005 | (United Kingdom) Jonathan Adam | Clio Renaultsport 182 | (United Kingdom) Matt Allison |
| 2006 | (United Kingdom) Tom Onslow-Cole | Clio Renaultsport 182 | (Austria) Niki Lanik |
| 2007 | (United Kingdom) Martin Byford | Clio Renaultsport 197 | (Austria) Niki Lanik |
| 2008 | (United Kingdom) Ben Winrow | Clio Renaultsport 197 | (Republic of Ireland) Árón Smith |
| 2009 | (United Kingdom) Phil Glew ^{‡} | Clio Renaultsport 197 | (United Kingdom) Daniel Lloyd |
| 2009 | (United Kingdom) Phil Glew ^{‡} | Clio Renaultsport 200 | (United Kingdom) Daniel Lloyd |
| 2010 | (United Kingdom) Dave Newsham | Clio Renaultsport 200 | Not Held |
| 2011 | (United Kingdom) Paul Rivett | Clio Renaultsport 200 | Not Held |
| 2012 | (United Kingdom) Jack Goff | Clio Renaultsport 200 | Not Held |
| 2013 | (United Kingdom) Josh Files | Clio Renaultsport 200 | Not Held |
| 2014 | (United Kingdom) Mike Bushell | Clio Renaultsport 200 Turbo EDC | Not Held |
| 2015 | (United Kingdom) Ashley Sutton | Clio Renaultsport 200 Turbo EDC | Not Held |
| 2016 | (United Kingdom) Ant Whorton-Eales | Clio Renaultsport 200 Turbo EDC | Not Held |
| 2017 | (United Kingdom) Mike Bushell | Clio Renaultsport 200 Turbo EDC | Not Held |
| 2018 | (United Kingdom) Paul Rivett | Clio Renaultsport 200 Turbo EDC | Not Held |
| 2019 | (United Kingdom) Jack Young | Clio Renaultsport 200 Turbo EDC | Not Held |
| 2020 | Not Held | | Not Held |
| 2021 | Not Held | | Not Held |
| 2022 | Not Held | | Not Held |
| 2023 | Not Held | | Not Held |
| 2024 | (United Kingdom) Nicky Taylor | Renault Clio Esprit Alpine | Not Held |

- ^‡ — In 2009, for the first half of the season, drivers used the Clio Renaultsport 197. For the second half, drivers used the Clio Renaultsport 200.

== Other UK Championships ==
When the British Automobile Racing Club returned as Clio Cup UK series promoter in December 2012, they set out their plans for the national championship for the next two years. With the announcement that the current Clio Renaultsport 200 race car will be replaced from 2014 season, Renault UK and the BARC announced a new entry level series to be known as the Michelin Clio Cup Series with Protyre. This championship, which will begin in 2013, is aimed at amateur and track day drivers and will use the current Clio Renaultsport 200 as well as the previous generation Clio Renaultsport 197. A four-round, double header calendar was also announced for 2013, visiting four of the UK's top racing circuits. From 2017 onwards, there will be a junior edition of the Renault Clio Cup for young drivers aged 14–17.

== See also ==
- Other Renault Clio Cup championships
- World Series by Renault
- Renault Sport
