= Scuderia Vittoria =

British motor racing team formed in 2010

(United Kingdom) Scuderia Vittoria
- Founded: 2010
- Team principal(s): Tom Ferrier, Danny Buxton & Piers Masarati
- Current series: British GT Championship; Renault Clio Cup UK

Scuderia Vittoria was a British motor racing team. The team was formed in late 2010 and is the brainchild of ex-BTCC racers Tom Ferrier and Danny Buxton along with multiple GT and single-seater championship team manager, Piers Masarati. The Middlesex based team ran a Ferrari 458 GT3 and a Ginetta G50 GT4 car in the 2011 British GT season. They also fielded up to 4 Renault Clio's in the UK Renault Clio Cup series.

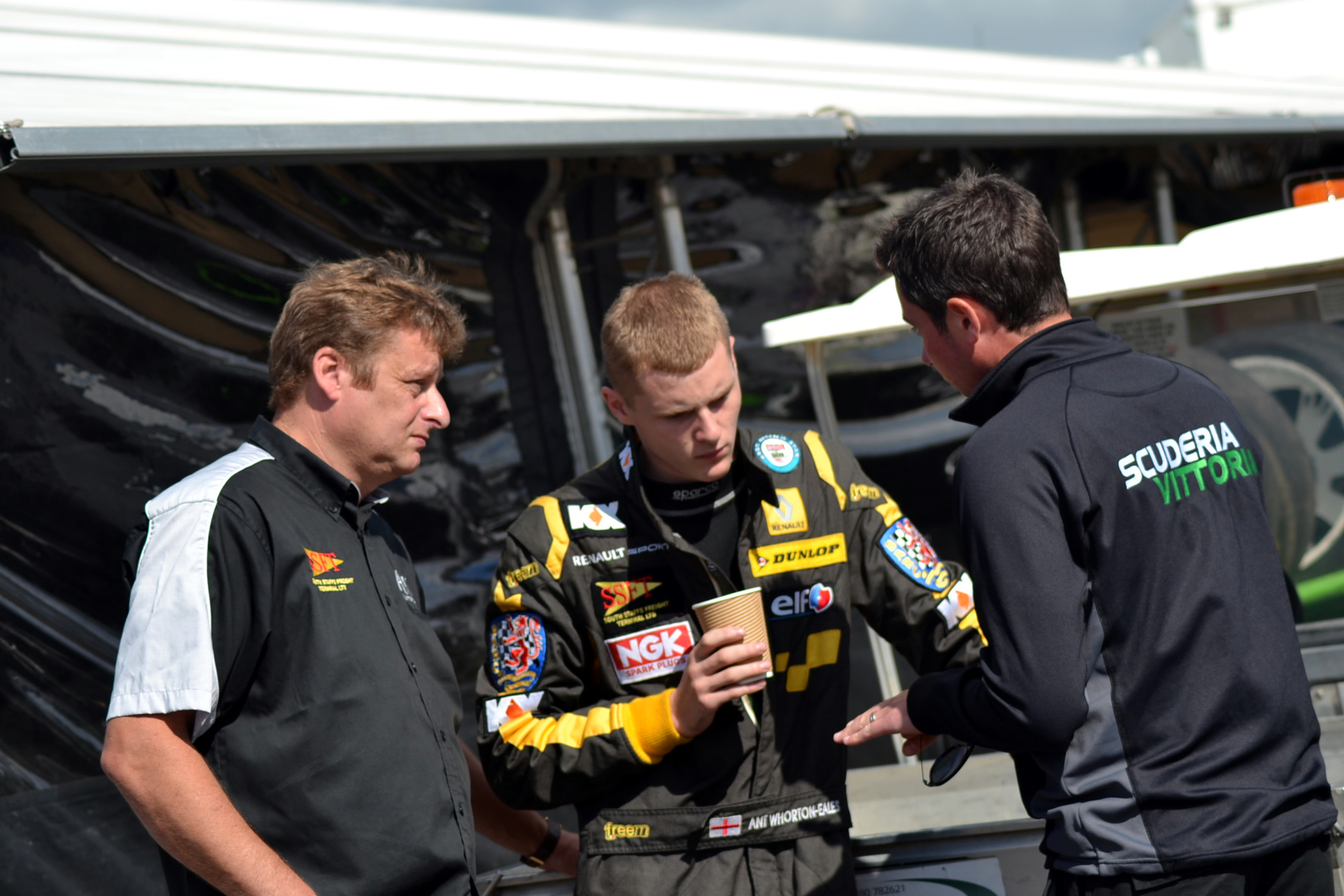

At the conclusion of the 2011 season, the team had achieved 12 wins over both classes with their maiden win at the first round of the British GT championship at Oulton Park.

== Results ==
=== Full season ===
==== British GT ====
Year	Car	Class	Drivers	Races	Wins	Poles	Fast laps	Points	D.C.
2011	Ferrari 458	GT3	(United Kingdom) Charles Bateman	10	2	1	-	116.5	3rd
2011	Ferrari 458	GT3	(United Kingdom) Michael Lyons	10	2	1	-	116.5	3rd
2011	Ginetta G50	GT4	(United Kingdom) Dan Denis	10	3	0	-	164	2nd
2011	Ginetta G50	GT4	(United Kingdom) David McDonald	10	3	0	-	164	2nd

D.C. = Drivers' Championship position.

==== Renault UK Clio Cup ====
Year	Car	No.	Drivers	Races	Wins	Poles	Fast laps	Points	D.C.	T.C
2011	Renault Clio	0	(Australia) Ash Miller	2	0	0	0	0*	N/A*	3rd
2011	Renault Clio	6	(United Kingdom) Chris Smith	2	0	0	0	10	26th	3rd
2011	Renault Clio	11	(United Kingdom) Matt Allison	12	2	2	0	168	9th	3rd
2011	Renault Clio	11	(United Kingdom) Ant Whorton-Eales	4	0	0	1	68	18th	3rd
2011	Renault Clio	41	(United Kingdom) Luke Wright	16	0	0	0	145	11th	3rd

* = Guest driver ineligible for points, D.C. = Drivers' Championship position, T.C. = Teams' Championship position

=== Partial Season ===
==== Renault Dutch Clio Cup ====
Year	Car	No.	Drivers	Races	Wins	Poles	Fast laps	Points	D.C.
2011	Renault Clio	41	(United Kingdom) Luke Wright	2	2	2	2	0*	N/A*

* = Guest driver ineligible for points, D.C. = Drivers' Championship position.

==== FIA GT3 European Championship ====
Year	Car	Drivers	Races	Wins	Poles	Fast laps	Points	D.C.
2011	Ferrari 458 GT3	(Italy) Giacomo Petrobelli	2	0	0	0	4	35th
2011	Ferrari 458 GT3	(Brazil) Carlos Iaconelli	2	0	0	0	4	35th
2011	Ferrari 458 GT3	(United Kingdom) Michael Lyons	2	0	0	1	18	25th
2011	Ferrari 458 GT3	(Czech Republic) Filip Salaquarda	2	0	0	1	18	26th

D.C. = Drivers' Championship position.

==== FIA GT4 European Championship ====
Year	Car	No.	Drivers	Races	Wins	Poles	Fast laps	Points	D.C.
2011	Ginetta G50 GT4	35	(United Kingdom) Dan Denis	3	0	0	0	0*	N/A*

* = Guest driver ineligible for points, D.C. = Drivers' Championship position.

==== Blancpain Endurance Series ====
Year	Car	Class	No.	Drivers	Races	Wins	Poles	Fast laps	Points	D.C.
2011	Ferrari 458 GT3	GT3 Pro	38	(Italy) Giacomo Petrobelli	3	0	0	0	53	6th
2011	Ferrari 458 GT3	GT3 Pro	38	(Italy) Matteo Bobbi	3	0	0	0	40	12th
2011	Ferrari 458 GT3	GT3 Pro	38	(Brazil) Carlos Iaconelli	3	0	0	0	33	15th

D.C. = Drivers' Championship position.

==== Britcar MSA British Endurance ====
Year	Car	Class	No.	Drivers	Races	Wins	Poles	Fast laps
2011	Ferrari 458	GT3	42	(United Kingdom) Phil Dryburgh	2	2	1	2
2011	Ferrari 458	GT3	42	(United Kingdom) John Gaw	2	2	1	2
2011	Ginetta G50	GT4	61	(United Kingdom) Dan Denis	1	0	0	0
2011	Ginetta G50	GT4	61	(United Kingdom) Dan Jones	1	0	0	0
2011	Ginetta G50	GT4	61	(United Kingdom) Gavin Spencer	1	0	0	0
2011	Ginetta G50	GT4	61	(United Kingdom) James Thorpe	1	0	0	0
