= 2014 Eurocup Clio =

Seasons
- ← 2013 none →

The 2014 Eurocup Clio season was the fourth season of the Renault–supported touring car category, a one-make racing series that formed part of the World Series by Renault. For the 2014 season, the series used the Renault Clio RS 197 as its car of choice.

For the second time in three years, the championship was won by Spanish driver Oscar Nogués for the Italian Rangoni Corse team. Nogués won five out of the season's eight races, and also recorded two pole positions and five fastest laps during the campaign. He won the championship by 40 points ahead of compatriot Mikel Azcona, who won races at Le Castellet and Jerez for PCR Sport. Éric Trémoulet finished third in the championship, taking six podium finishes during the season for the Vic'Team. The season's only other winner was Composit Motorsport's Massimiliano Pedalà, who won at the Nürburgring.

== Race calendar and results ==
The calendar for the 2014 season was announced on 20 October 2013, the final day of the 2013 season. All four rounds formed meetings of the 2014 World Series by Renault season.

| Round | | Circuit | Country | Date | Pole position | Fastest lap | Winning driver | Winning team |
|---|---|---|---|---|---|---|---|---|
| 1 | R1 | Ciudad del Motor de Aragón, Alcañiz | Spain | 26 April | (United Kingdom) Josh Files | (United Kingdom) Josh Files | (Spain) Oscar Nogués | (Italy) Rangoni Corse |
| 1 | R2 | Ciudad del Motor de Aragón, Alcañiz | Spain | 27 April | (France) Éric Trémoulet | (Spain) Oscar Nogués | (Spain) Oscar Nogués | (Italy) Rangoni Corse |
| 2 | R1 | Nürburgring | Germany | 12 July | (Spain) Oscar Nogués | (Argentina) Facundo Della Motta | (Italy) Massimiliano Pedalà | (Italy) Composit Motorsport |
| 2 | R2 | Nürburgring | Germany | 13 July | (United Kingdom) Josh Files | (Spain) Oscar Nogués | (Spain) Oscar Nogués | (Italy) Rangoni Corse |
| 3 | R1 | Circuit Paul Ricard, Le Castellet | France | 27 September | (France) Éric Trémoulet | (Spain) Oscar Nogués | (Spain) Mikel Azcona | (Spain) PCR Sport |
| 3 | R2 | Circuit Paul Ricard, Le Castellet | France | 28 September | (Spain) Mikel Azcona | (Italy) Massimiliano Pedalà | (Spain) Oscar Nogués | (Italy) Rangoni Corse |
| 4 | R1 | Circuito de Jerez | Spain | 18 October | (Spain) Oscar Nogués | (Spain) Oscar Nogués | (Spain) Oscar Nogués | (Italy) Rangoni Corse |
| 4 | R2 | Circuito de Jerez | Spain | 19 October | (Spain) Mikel Azcona | (Spain) Oscar Nogués | (Spain) Mikel Azcona | (Spain) PCR Sport |

== Championship standings ==
=== Drivers' Championship ===
| Pos | Driver | ALC (Spain) | | NÜR (Germany) | | LEC (France) | | JER (Spain) | | Points |
|---|---|---|---|---|---|---|---|---|---|---|
| 1 | (Spain) Oscar Nogués | 1 | 1 | **7** | 1 | 5 | 1 | **1** | 2 | 161 |
| 2 | (Spain) Mikel Azcona | 3 | 4 | 8 | 4 | 1 | **6** | 2 | **1** | 121 |
| 3 | (France) Éric Trémoulet | 4 | **2** | 11 | 3 | **2** | 2 | 3 | 3 | 112 |
| 4 | (Italy) Massimiliano Pedalà | 7 | 3 | 1 | 5 | 4 | 4 | 5 | 4 | 102 |
| 5 | (United Kingdom) Alex Morgan | 12 | 10 | 10 | 2 | 3 | Ret | 4 | 5 | 59 |
| 6 | (Argentina) Facundo Della Motta | Ret | 14 | 3 | 9 | 7 | Ret | 10 | 6 | 36 |
| 7 | (Croatia) Ivan Pulić | DSQ | 8 | 14 | 6 | Ret | 3 | 9 | 10 | 34 |
| 8 | (United Kingdom) Josh Files | **2** | 9 | 6 | **17**† | | | | | 32 |
| 9 | (Spain) Pablo Martín | 9 | 17 | 15 | 11 | 11 | 5 | 7 | 7 | 27 |
| 10 | (Netherlands) Renee Steenmetz | 14 | 13 | 4 | 13 | 8 | 8 | 11 | 15 | 26 |
| 11 | (Romania) Salvatore Arcarese | 5 | 12 | 12 | 10 | 6 | 11 | Ret | 9 | 23 |
| 12 | (Russia) Nikolay Gryazin | 10 | 11 | 5 | 8 | | | 14 | 8 | 23 |
| 13 | (Spain) Antonio Martínez | 6 | 7 | | | | | | | 16 |
| 14 | (Spain) Manuel Leon | | | 19 | 12 | 10 | 10 | 6 | 13 | 14 |
| 15 | (France) Olivier Jouffret | 11 | 5 | | | Ret | DNS | | | 11 |
| 16 | (Spain) Rafael Villanueva | | | 9 | 7 | 16 | Ret | | | 10 |
| 17 | (United Kingdom) Finlay Crocker | 22 | 22 | 17 | 15 | 13 | 12 | 15 | 14 | 1 |
| | (Portugal) Fabio Mota | 16 | 16 | | | | | 13 | 11 | 0 |
| | (Slovenia) Andro Pertot | 18 | 19 | 18 | 16 | Ret | Ret | 12 | 12 | 0 |
| | (Croatia) Filip Romić | | | | | 15 | 13 | | | 0 |
| | (Spain) Santi Navarro | 13 | 20 | | | | | | | 0 |
| | (Russia) Andrey Artyushin | 19 | 24 | 20 | 14 | 14 | 14 | 16 | 17 | 0 |
| | (Italy) Ronnie Marchetti | 17 | 15 | 16 | Ret | Ret | DNS | | | 0 |
| | (France) Clément Mateu | 15 | Ret | | | | | | | 0 |
| | (Hong Kong) Bentley Yeung | | | | | | | 18 | 16 | 0 |
| | (China) Yang Xu | | | | | | | 17 | 18 | 0 |
| | (France) Jean-Philippe Lamic | 20 | 18 | | | | | | | 0 |
| | (China) Huang Yi | | | | | | | 21 | 19 | 0 |
| | (Hong Kong) Kenneth Ma | | | | | | | 19 | Ret | 0 |
| | (China) Ye Xing Ping | | | | | | | 20 | Ret | 0 |
| | (China) Han Hui Lin | | | | | | | Ret | 20 | 0 |
| | (France) Jean-Laurent Navarro | 21 | 21 | | | | | | | 0 |
| | (Italy) Luciano Gioia | 23 | 23 | DNS | DNS | | | | | 0 |
| | (Italy) Marco Ampolo | Ret | Ret | | | | | | | 0 |
| | (China) Han Zhen Lin | | | | | | | DNS | Ret | 0 |
Guest drivers ineligible for points
| | (Czech Republic) Tomáš Pekař | | | 2 | Ret | | | | | 0 |
| | (Denmark) Thomas Fjordbach | 8 | 6 | | | | | | | 0 |
| | (Italy) Aldo Ponti | | | | | 12 | 7 | 8 | Ret | 0 |
| | (Netherlands) Stephane Polderman | | | 13 | DNS | 9 | 9 | | | 0 |
| Pos | Driver | ALC (Spain) | | NÜR (Germany) | | LEC (France) | | JER (Spain) | | Points |

| Colour | Result |
|---|---|
| Gold | Winner |
| Silver | Second place |
| Bronze | Third place |
| Green | Points classification |
| Blue | Non-points classification |
| Blue | Non-classified finish (NC) |
| Purple | Retired, not classified (Ret) |
| Red | Did not qualify (DNQ) |
| Red | Did not pre-qualify (DNPQ) |
| Black | Disqualified (DSQ) |
| White | Did not start (DNS) |
| White | Withdrew (WD) |
| White | Race cancelled (C) |
| Blank | Did not practice (DNP) |
| Blank | Did not arrive (DNA) |
| Blank | Excluded (EX) |

**Bold** – Pole
Italics – Fastest Lap
