= 2014 World Series by Renault =

Seasons
- ← 2013 2015 →

The 2014 World Series by Renault was the tenth season of Renault Sport's series of events, with three different championships racing under one banner. Consisting of the Formula Renault 3.5 Series, Eurocup Formula Renault 2.0 and Eurocup Clio. It was the first season without Eurocup Mégane Trophy.

The series began on 26 April at the Ciudad del Motor de Aragón in Alcañiz, and finished on 19 October at the Circuito de Jerez, just outside Jerez de la Frontera. Round at Jerez replaced Barcelona round, who took place in the series schedule since 2006. Rounds at Red Bull Ring was dropped. While Nürburgring returned to the series' schedule, while Formula Renault 3.5 had two extra races on its own, in support of the Monaco Grand Prix and Monza Blancpain Endurance Series Series round.

== Race calendar ==
- Event in light blue is not part of the World Series, but is a championship round for the Formula Renault 3.5 Series.

Circuit	Location	Date	Series	Winning driver	Winning team
(Italy) Autodromo Nazionale Monza	Monza, Italy	12 April	FR3.5 1	(United Kingdom) Will Stevens	(United Kingdom) Fortec Motorsports
(Italy) Autodromo Nazionale Monza	Monza, Italy	13 April	FR3.5 2	(Spain) Carlos Sainz Jr.	(France) DAMS
(Spain) Ciudad del Motor de Aragón	Alcañiz, Spain	26 April	FR3.5 3	(Spain) Carlos Sainz Jr.	(France) DAMS
(Spain) Ciudad del Motor de Aragón	Alcañiz, Spain	26 April	FR2.0 1	(Netherlands) Nyck de Vries	(Finland) Koiranen GP
(Spain) Ciudad del Motor de Aragón	Alcañiz, Spain	26 April	EC 1	(Spain) Oscar Nogués	(Italy) Rangoni Corse
(Spain) Ciudad del Motor de Aragón	Alcañiz, Spain	27 April	FR3.5 4	(United Kingdom) Oliver Rowland	(United Kingdom) Fortec Motorsports
(Spain) Ciudad del Motor de Aragón	Alcañiz, Spain	27 April	FR2.0 2	(France) Andrea Pizzitola	(Netherlands) Manor MP Motorsport
(Spain) Ciudad del Motor de Aragón	Alcañiz, Spain	27 April	EC 2	(Spain) Oscar Nogués	(Italy) Rangoni Corse
Circuit de Monaco	Monte Carlo, Monaco	25 May	FR3.5 5	(France) Norman Nato	(France) DAMS
(Belgium) Circuit de Spa-Francorchamps	Spa, Belgium	31 May	FR3.5 6	(Spain) Carlos Sainz Jr.	(France) DAMS
(Belgium) Circuit de Spa-Francorchamps	Spa, Belgium	31 May	FR2.0 3	(Norway) Dennis Olsen	(Italy) Prema Powerteam
(Belgium) Circuit de Spa-Francorchamps	Spa, Belgium	1 June	FR3.5 7	(Spain) Carlos Sainz Jr.	(France) DAMS
(Belgium) Circuit de Spa-Francorchamps	Spa, Belgium	1 June	FR2.0 4	(Brazil) Bruno Bonifacio	(Italy) Prema Powerteam
(Russia) Moscow Raceway	Volokolamsk, Russia	28 June	FR3.5 8	(Russia) Sergey Sirotkin	(United Kingdom) Fortec Motorsports
(Russia) Moscow Raceway	Volokolamsk, Russia	28 June	FR2.0 5	(France) Aurélien Panis	(France) ART Junior Team
(Russia) Moscow Raceway	Volokolamsk, Russia	29 June	FR3.5 9	(Spain) Roberto Merhi	(Russia) Zeta Corse
(Russia) Moscow Raceway	Volokolamsk, Russia	29 June	FR2.0 6	(Switzerland) Kevin Jörg	(Germany) Josef Kaufmann Racing
(Germany) Nürburgring	Nürburg, Germany	12 July	FR3.5 10	(Spain) Carlos Sainz Jr.	(France) DAMS
(Germany) Nürburgring	Nürburg, Germany	12 July	FR2.0 7	(Netherlands) Nyck de Vries	(Finland) Koiranen GP
(Germany) Nürburgring	Nürburg, Germany	12 July	EC 3	(Italy) Massimiliano Pedalà	(Italy) Composit Motorsport
(Germany) Nürburgring	Nürburg, Germany	13 July	FR3.5 11	(Spain) Roberto Merhi	(Russia) Zeta Corse
(Germany) Nürburgring	Nürburg, Germany	13 July	FR2.0 8	(Norway) Dennis Olsen	(Italy) Prema Powerteam
(Germany) Nürburgring	Nürburg, Germany	13 July	EC 4	(Spain) Oscar Nogués	(Italy) Rangoni Corse
(Hungary) Hungaroring	Mogyoród, Hungary	13 September	FR3.5 12	(Spain) Roberto Merhi	(Russia) Zeta Corse
(Hungary) Hungaroring	Mogyoród, Hungary	13 September	FR2.0 9	(France) Andrea Pizzitola	(Netherlands) Manor MP Motorsport
(Hungary) Hungaroring	Mogyoród, Hungary	14 September	FR3.5 13	(France) Norman Nato	(France) DAMS
(Hungary) Hungaroring	Mogyoród, Hungary	14 September	FR2.0 10	(United Kingdom) Jack Aitken	(United Kingdom) Fortec Motorsports
(France) Circuit Paul Ricard	Le Castellet, France	27 September	FR3.5 14	(Spain) Carlos Sainz Jr.	(France) DAMS
(France) Circuit Paul Ricard	Le Castellet, France	27 September	FR2.0 11	(Netherlands) Nyck de Vries	(Finland) Koiranen GP
(France) Circuit Paul Ricard	Le Castellet, France	27 September	EC 5	(Spain) Mikel Azcona	(Spain) PCR Sport
(France) Circuit Paul Ricard	Le Castellet, France	28 September	FR3.5 15	(Spain) Carlos Sainz Jr.	(France) DAMS
(France) Circuit Paul Ricard	Le Castellet, France	28 September	FR2.0 12	(Netherlands) Nyck de Vries	(Finland) Koiranen GP
(France) Circuit Paul Ricard	Le Castellet, France	28 September	EC 6	(Spain) Oscar Nogués	(Italy) Rangoni Corse
(Spain) Circuito de Jerez	Jerez de la Frontera, Spain	18 October	FR3.5 16	(United Kingdom) Will Stevens	(United Kingdom) Strakka Racing
(Spain) Circuito de Jerez	Jerez de la Frontera, Spain	18 October	FR2.0 13	(Netherlands) Nyck de Vries	(Finland) Koiranen GP
(Spain) Circuito de Jerez	Jerez de la Frontera, Spain	18 October	EC 7	(Spain) Oscar Nogués	(Italy) Rangoni Corse
(Spain) Circuito de Jerez	Jerez de la Frontera, Spain	19 October	FR3.5 17	(United Kingdom) Oliver Rowland	(United Kingdom) Fortec Motorsports
(Spain) Circuito de Jerez	Jerez de la Frontera, Spain	19 October	FR2.0 14	(United Kingdom) George Russell	(France) Tech 1 Racing
(Spain) Circuito de Jerez	Jerez de la Frontera, Spain	19 October	EC 8	(Spain) Mikel Azcona	(Spain) PCR Sport

Icon	Championship
FR3.5	Formula Renault 3.5 Series
FR2.0	Eurocup Formula Renault 2.0
EC	Eurocup Clio

== Championships ==
=== Formula Renault 3.5 Series ===
Pos.	Driver	Team	Points
1	(Spain) Carlos Sainz Jr.	(France) DAMS	227
2	(France) Pierre Gasly	(United Kingdom) Arden Motorsport	192
3	(Spain) Roberto Merhi	(Russia) Zeta Corse	183
4	(United Kingdom) Oliver Rowland	(United Kingdom) Fortec Motorsports	181
5	(Russia) Sergey Sirotkin	(United Kingdom) Fortec Motorsports	132

=== Eurocup Formula Renault 2.0 ===
Pos.	Driver	Team	Points
1	(Netherlands) Nyck de Vries	(Finland) Koiranen GP	254
2	(Norway) Dennis Olsen	(Italy) Prema Powerteam	124
3	(Thailand) Alexander Albon	(Belgium) KTR	117
4	(France) Andrea Pizzitola	(Netherlands) Manor MP Motorsport	108
5	(Brazil) Bruno Bonifacio	(Italy) Prema Powerteam	88

=== Eurocup Clio ===
Pos.	Driver	Team	Points
1	(Spain) Oscar Nogués	(Italy) Rangoni Corse	161
2	(Spain) Mikel Azcona	(Spain) PCR Sport	121
3	(France) Eric Tremoulet	(France) Vic Team	112
4	(Italy) Massimiliano Pedalà	(Italy) Composit Motorsport	102
5	(United Kingdom) Alex Morgan	(Italy) Rangoni Corse	59
