= FIA Institute Young Driver Excellence Academy =

The FIA Institute Young Driver Excellence Academy was a programme founded by the FIA Institute for Motor Sport Safety and Sustainability to develop young driver talent worldwide.

In its first year (2011) the Institute selected 12 drivers to take part in the programme. 19 drivers were shortlisted for a three-day selection event, which took place on 6–8 February 2011 in Melk, Austria.

For 2012, the FIA shortlisted 30 young drivers, of whom 18 were selected for the second year of the programme.

In 2013, selection events were held across five continents with the winners from each event joining five chosen wildcards to form a ten driver academy.

The participants were trained by professional racing and rally drivers Alexander Wurz and Robert Reid, with workshops taking place throughout the year.

The program ended in 2015.

== Participants ==
=== 2011 ===
Driver	2011 Series
(Netherlands) Kevin Abbring	Selected rallies
(France) Paul-Loup Chatin	Eurocup Formula Renault 2.0
(Spain) Albert Costa	Formula Renault 3.5 series
(Israel) Alon Day	German Formula Three Championship
(Austria) Philipp Eng	ADAC GT Masters
(Netherlands) Robin Frijns	Eurocup Formula Renault 2.0
(Sweden) Timmy Hansen	Eurocup Formula Renault 2.0
(Estonia) Egon Kaur	WRC Academy Drivers' Championship
(Norway) Andreas Mikkelsen	Intercontinental Rally Challenge
(United States) Alexander Rossi	Formula Renault 3.5 series
(New Zealand) Richie Stanaway	German Formula Three Championship
(Belgium) Stoffel Vandoorne	Eurocup Formula Renault 2.0

=== 2012 ===
Driver	2012 Series
(United Arab Emirates) Mohamed Al Mutawaa	
(Austria) Klaus Bachler	Porsche Carrera Cup Germany
(South Africa) Andrea Bate	
(Republic of Ireland) Craig Breen	Super 2000 World Rally Championship
(Italy) Andrea Caldarelli	Super GT
(Colombia) Gabby Chaves	Indy Lights
(Lithuania) Jonas Gelžinis	Porsche Carrera Cup Great Britain
(Denmark) Michael Klitgaard Christensen	Porsche Carrera Cup Germany
(Australia) Jack Le Brocq	Australian Formula Ford Championship
(United States) Michael Lewis	Formula 3 Euro Series
(United Kingdom) Alex Lynn	British Formula 3
(Costa Rica) José Andrès Montalto	
(Spain) Ramón Piñeiro	
(Australia) Brendan Reeves	WRC Academy Drivers' Championship
(Sweden) Pontus Tidemand	WRC Academy Drivers' Championship
(Netherlands) Timo van der Marel	WRC Academy Drivers' Championship
(Germany) Sepp Wiegand	Intercontinental Rally Challenge
(United Kingdom) Lewis Williamson	GP3 Series

=== 2013 ===
Driver	2013 Series
(Switzerland) Yannick Amberg-Mettler	German Formula Three Championship
(Italy) Fabio Andolfi	Italian Rally Championship
(Austria) Lucas Auer	FIA European Formula 3 Championship
(Romania) Raul Badiu	Dacia Logan Cup
(Croatia) Nikola Belohradski	Eurocup Clio
(Belgium) Kevin Demaerschalk	French Rally Championship
(United Kingdom) Jake Dennis	Eurocup Formula Renault 2.0
(Denmark) Michelle Gatting	VW Scirocco R-Cup
(Lithuania) Ignas Gelzinis	Renault Clio Cup GB
(Czech Republic) Patrik Hajek	CIK-FIA European Championship
(Slovakia) Matej Homola	FIA European Touring Car Cup
(France) Anthoine Hubert	French Formule 4 Championship
(Sweden) Erik Johansson	Formula Renault 1.6 Nordic Championship
(Hungary) Benedek Major	FIA European Truck Racing Championship
(Malta) Jacques Mizzi	Renault Clio Cup GB
(Poland) Bartlomej Mirecki	Polish Championship Kia Picanto
(Serbia) Nikola Milijkovic	CEZ Championship
(Israel) Roy Nissany	FIA European Formula 3 Championship
(Norway) Dennis Olsen	Formula Renault 2.0 NEC
(Republic of Ireland) Kevin O'Hara	Irish Formula Ford Championship
(Slovenia) Klemen Popit	Slovenian National Championship LEMA-GP
(South Africa) Daniel Popov	Bulgarian Rally Championship
(Spain) Alex Riberas	Porsche Carrera Cup Deutschland
(Estonia) Rasmus Uustulnd	Estonian Rally Cup
(Netherlands) Dennis van de Laar	FIA European Formula 3 Championship

=== 2014 ===
Driver	2014 Series
(Saudi Arabia) Abdullah Bamogaddam	
(Mexico) Jorge Cevallos	Formula Renault 2.0 NEC
(Venezuela) Diego Ferreira	LATAM Challenge Series
(Denmark) Michelle Gatting	Porsche Carrera Cup Germany
(Lithuania) Ignas Gelzinis	Volkswagen Castrol Cup
(Costa Rica) Mauricio Hernandez	
(Sweden) Erik Johansson	
(South Africa) Henk Lategan	European Rally Championship
(India) Akhil Rabindra	Formula Masters China
(South Africa) Kelvin van der Linde	ADAC GT Masters
(Nigeria) Ovie Iroro	

=== 2015 ===
Driver	2015 Series
(Australia) Anton de Pasquale	Eurocup Formula Renault 2.0
(Brazil) Pietro Fittipaldi	FIA European Formula 3
(Australia) Macauley Jones	Dunlop V8 Supercar Series
(United Kingdom) Jordan King	GP2 Series
(United States) Kenton Koch	Cooper Tires Prototype Lites
(France) Stéphane Lefebvre	European Rally Championship
(Kuwait) Ali Makhseed	Drifting Championships
(United Kingdom) Seb Morris	GP3 Series
(Slovenia) Tim Novak	
(South Africa) Jordan Pepper	ADAC GT Masters
(Cyprus) Panikos Polykarpou	
(Australia) Aidan Wright	Italian GT Championship

- Driver of the Year award: Jordan King
