= Josh Files =

British racing driver

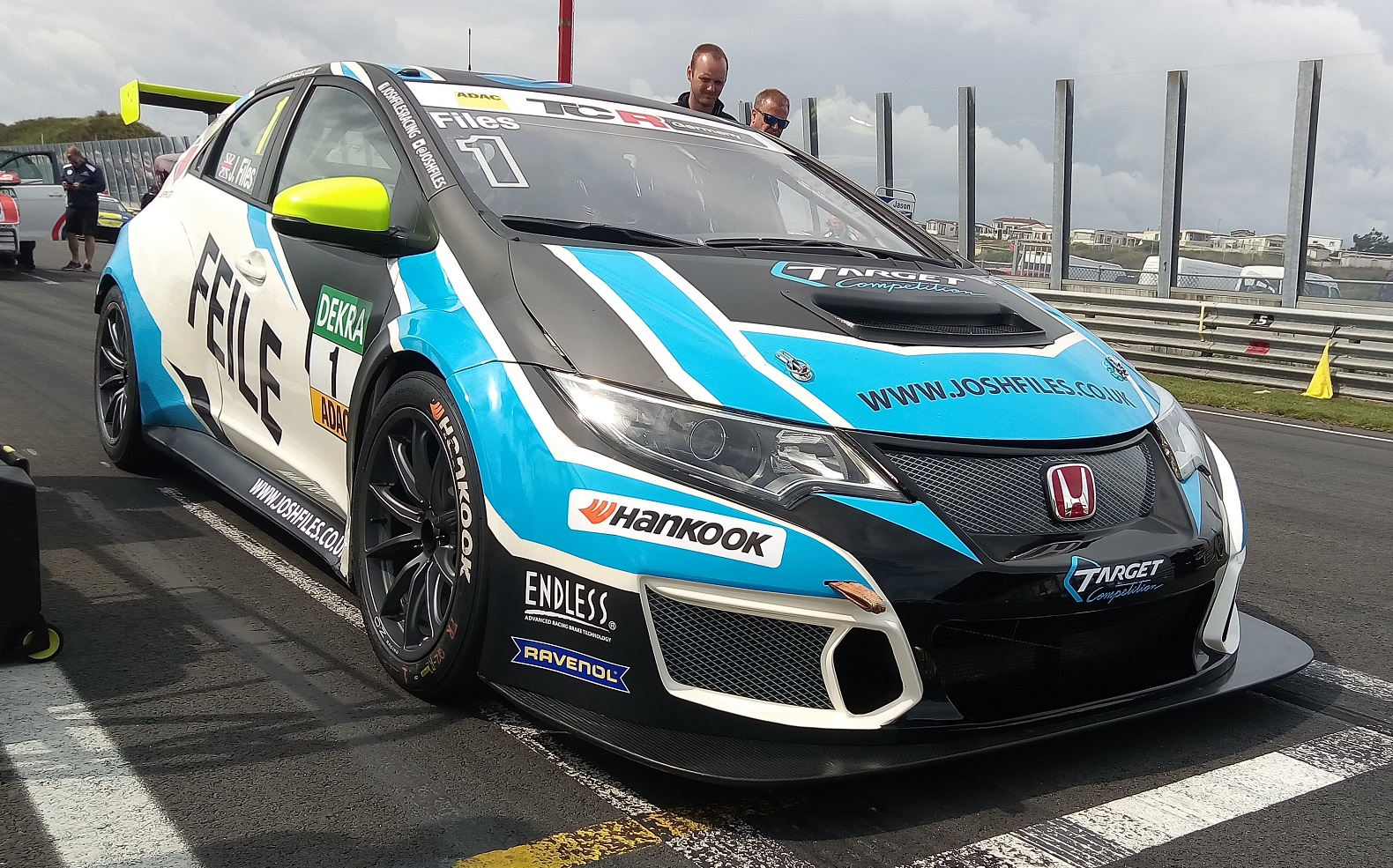
- Nationality: (United Kingdom) British
- Born: Joshua Luke Files; 9 January 1991 (age 35) Norwich, Norfolk, UK

TCR International Series career
- Debut season: 2015
- Current team: M1RA
- Car number: 95
- Former teams: Campos Racing, Target Competition
- Starts: 6
- Wins: 0
- Poles: 0
- Fastest laps: 0
- Best finish: 23rd in 2017

Previous series
- 2017 2015-16 2014 2013-14 2011-13 2009-10: TCR Middle East Series; Clio Cup Italia; Porsche Carrera Cup GB; Eurocup Clio; Renault Clio Cup United Kingdom; Thoroughbred Sports Cars

Championship titles
- 2019 2017 2016-17 2013 2013 2010: TCR Europe; TCR Middle East Series; TCR Germany; Eurocup Clio; Renault Clio Cup United Kingdom; Thoroughbred Sports Cars

Joshua Luke Files (born 9 January 1991) is a British racing driver currently competing in the TCR International Series. Having previously competed in the Renault Clio Cup United Kingdom and Eurocup Clio amongst others. Files won both championships in 2013.

== Racing career ==
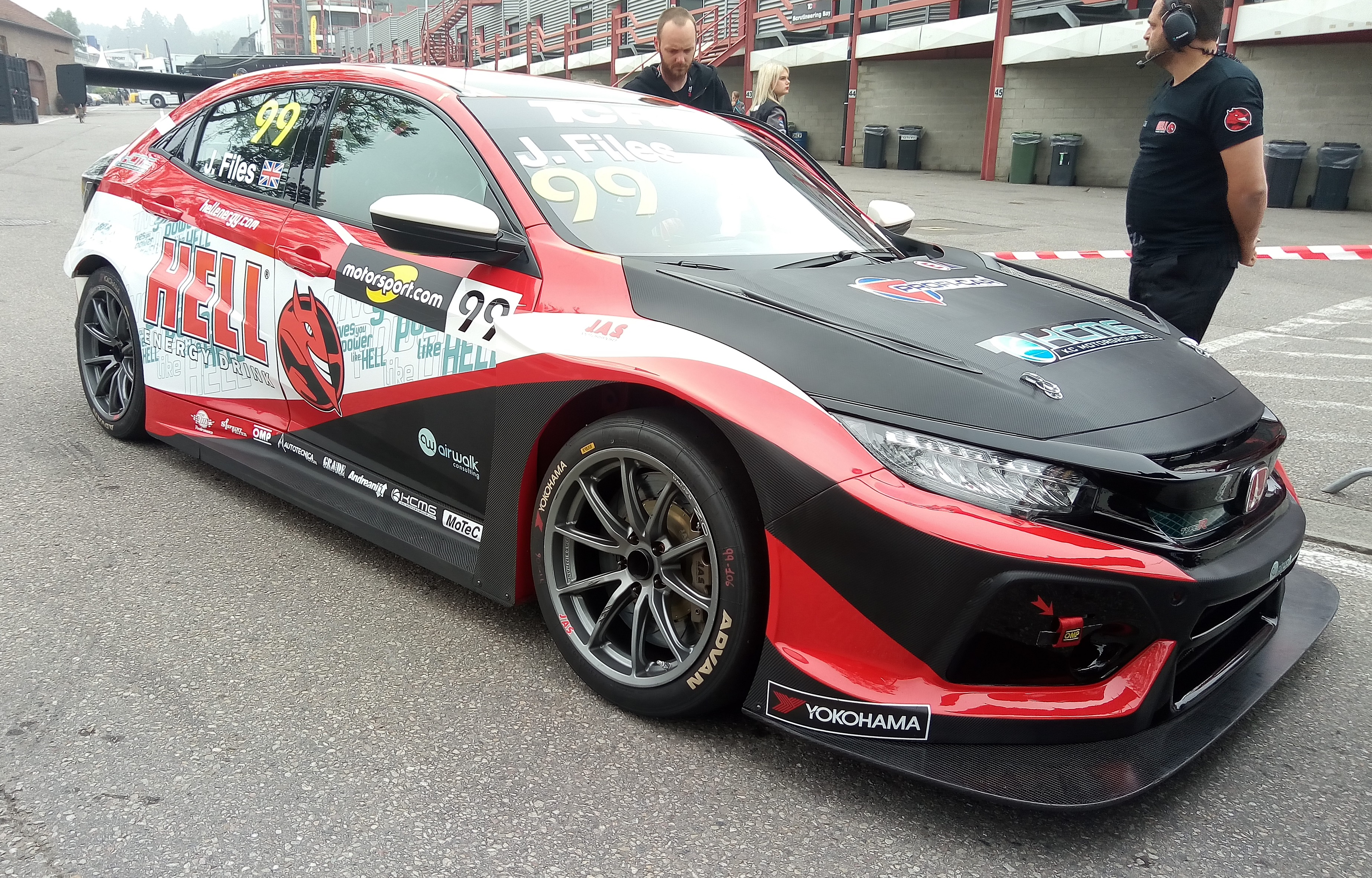
Files' car in 2018

Files began his career in 2009 in the Thoroughbred Sports Cars series, he raced there until 2010, winning the championship that year. He switched to the Renault Clio Cup United Kingdom for 2011, finishing seventh in the championship standings in his rookie season. He took four pole positions in 2012, finishing sixth in the standings. In 2013, he took five pole positions and two victories on his way to winning the championship. He also raced in the Eurocup Clio series in 2013, also winning the championship that year, with four pole positions and four wins. He continued in the Eurocup Clio series in 2014. He also raced a guest entry in the 2014 Porsche Carrera Cup Great Britain season that year. In 2015, he raced in the Clio Cup Italia series, finishing third in the standings.

In November 2015, it was announced that Flies would race in the TCR International Series, driving an Opel Astra OPC for Campos Racing.

Flies joined Target Competition to race at the 2016 ADAC TCR Germany Touring Car Championship. He scored six wins in 14 races and claimed the title. During the off-season, he claimed the 2017 TCR Middle East Series, winning all races he entered.

== Racing record ==
=== Career summary ===
| Season | Series | Team | Races | Wins | Poles | F/Laps | Podiums | Points | Position |
|---|---|---|---|---|---|---|---|---|---|
| 2009 | Thoroughbred Sports Cars - Class C | | 3 | 0 | 0 | 0 | 1 | 0 | NC† |
| 2010 | Thoroughbred Sports Cars - Class C | | 8 | 4 | 7 | 6 | 5 | 49 | **1st** |
| 2011 | Renault Clio Cup UK | Team Pyro | 16 | 0 | 0 | 1 | 2 | 207 | 7th |
| 2012 | Renault Clio Cup UK | Team Pyro | 16 | 0 | 4 | 2 | 4 | 268 | 6th |
| 2013 | Renault Clio Cup UK | Team Pyro | 16 | 2 | 5 | 9 | 10 | 382 | **1st** |
| 2013 | Renault Clio Eurocup | Team Pyro | 12 | 4 | 4 | 1 | 9 | 198 | **1st** |
| 2014 | Renault Clio Eurocup | Team Pyro | 4 | 0 | 2 | 1 | 1 | 32 | 8th |
| 2014 | Porsche Carrera Cup GB | In2 Racing | 2 | 0 | 0 | 0 | 0 | 0 | NC† |
| 2015 | Renault Clio Cup Italy | Rangoni Corse | 13 | 4 | 0 | 4 | 7 | 178 | **3rd** |
| 2015 | TCR International Series | Campos Racing | 2 | 0 | 0 | 0 | 0 | 0 | NC |
| 2016 | ADAC TCR Germany Touring Car Championship | Target Competition | 14 | 6 | 4 | 2 | 8 | 222 | **1st** |
| 2016 | TCR International Series | Target Competition | 2 | 0 | 0 | 0 | 0 | 4.5 | 24th |
| 2016 | TCR Trophy Europe | Target Competition | 2 | 1 | 0 | 0 | 2 | 25 | 4th |
| 2016 | Renault Clio Cup Italy | Rangoni Corse | 5 | 1 | 0 | 0 | 4 | 73 | 7th |
| 2017 | ADAC TCR Germany Touring Car Championship | Target Competition | 14 | 6 | 0 | 2 | 9 | 411 | **1st** |
| 2017 | TCR Trophy Europe | Target Competition | 2 | 1 | 0 | 0 | 1 | 43 | **3rd** |
| 2017 | TCR Middle East Series | Lap57 Motorsports | 4 | 4 | 2 | 3 | 4 | 110 | **1st** |
| 2017 | TCR International Series | M1RA | 2 | 0 | 0 | 0 | 1 | 23 | 23rd |
| 2018 | TCR Europe Touring Car Series | Hell Energy Racing with KCMG | 14 | 1 | 1 | 0 | 4 | 121 | 6th |
| 2019 | TCR Europe Touring Car Series | Autodis Racing by Target Competition | 14 | 3 | 1 | 4 | 8 | 352 | **1st** |
| 2019 | TCR BeNeLux Touring Car Championship | Autodis Racing by Target Competition | 10 | 2 | 1 | 3 | 5 | 259 | **2nd** |
| 2020 | World Touring Car Cup | Engstler Hyundai N Liqui Moly Racing Team | 3 | 0 | 0 | 0 | 0 | 9 | 21st |
| 2020 | TCR Malaysia Touring Car Championship | Solite Indigo Racing | 4 | 0 | 0 | 0 | 2 | 55 | 4th |
| 2022 | TCR Europe Touring Car Series | Target Competition | 13 | 0 | 0 | 0 | 3 | 285 | **3rd** |
| 2023 | TCR UK Touring Car Championship | Area Motorsport | 2 | 0 | 1 | 1 | 1 | 42 | 20nd |

^{†} As Files was a guest driver, he was ineligible for points. ^{*} Season still in progress.

=== Complete TCR International Series results ===
(key) (Races in bold indicate pole position) (Races in italics indicate fastest lap)

| Year | Team | Car | 1 | 2 | 3 | 4 | 5 | 6 | 7 | 8 | 9 | 10 | 11 | 12 | 13 | 14 | 15 | 16 | 17 | 18 | 19 | 20 | 21 | 22 | DC | Points |
|---|---|---|---|---|---|---|---|---|---|---|---|---|---|---|---|---|---|---|---|---|---|---|---|---|---|---|
| 2015 | Campos Racing | Opel Astra OPC | SEP; 1 | SEP; 2 | SHA; 1 | SHA; 2 | VAL; 1 | VAL; 2 | ALG; 1 | ALG; 2 | MNZ; 1 | MNZ; 2 | SAL; 1 | SAL; 2 | SOC; 1 | SOC; 2 | RBR; 1 | RBR; 2 | MRN; 1 | MRN; 2 | CHA; 1 | CHA; 2 | MAC; 1; 13 | MAC; 2 Ret | NC | 0 |
| 2016 | Target Competition | Honda Civic TCR | BHR; 1 | BHR; 2 | EST; 1 | EST; 2 | SPA; 1 | SPA; 2 | IMO; 1 | IMO; 2 | SAL; 1 | SAL; 2 | OSC; 1 | OSC; 2 | SOC; 1 | SOC; 2 | CHA; 1 | CHA; 2 | MRN; 1 | MRN; 2 | SEP; 1 | SEP; 2 | MAC; 1; 14 | MAC; 2; 6 | 24th | 4.5 |
| 2017 | M1RA | Honda Civic TCR | RIM; 1 | RIM; 2 | BHR; 1 | BHR; 2 | SPA; 1 | SPA; 2 | MNZ; 1 | MNZ; 2 | SAL; 1 | SAL; 2 | HUN; 1 | HUN; 2 | OSC; 1 | OSC; 2 | CHA; 1 | CHA; 2 | ZHE; 1 | ZHE; 2 | DUB; 1; 6 | DUB; 2; 3 | | | 23rd | 23 |

=== Complete TCR Europe Touring Car Series results ===
(key) (Races in bold indicate pole position) (Races in italics indicate fastest lap)

| Year | Team | Car | 1 | 2 | 3 | 4 | 5 | 6 | 7 | 8 | 9 | 10 | 11 | 12 | 13 | 14 | DC | Points |
|---|---|---|---|---|---|---|---|---|---|---|---|---|---|---|---|---|---|---|
| 2018 | Hell Energy Racing with KCMG | Honda Civic Type R TCR | LEC; 1; 4^{5} | LEC; 2; 15 | ZAN; 1; 4 | ZAN; 2; 1 | SPA; 1 Ret | SPA; 2; 19† | HUN; 1 Ret^{3} | HUN; 2; 3 | **ASS**; **1**; 10^{1} | ASS; 2 Ret | MNZ; 1; 3^{4} | MNZ; 2; 2 | CAT; 1; 24^{2} | CAT; 2; 6 | 6th | 121 |
| 2019 | Autodis Racing by Target Competition | Hyundai i30 N TCR | HUN; 1; 2 | HUN; 2; 8 | **HOC**; **1**; 1 | HOC; 2; 8 | SPA; 1 Ret | SPA; 2; 14 | RBR; 1; 1 | RBR; 2; 2 | OSC; 1; 3 | OSC; 2; 3 | CAT; 1; 21 | CAT; 2; 5 | MNZ; 1; 3 | MNZ; 2; 1 | 1st | 352 |
| 2022 | Target Competition | Hyundai Elantra N TCR | ALG; 1; 6 | ALG; 2; 5 | LEC; 1; 8 | LEC; 2; 17 | SPA; 1; 3 | SPA; 2; 5 | NOR; 1; 2 | NOR; 2; 3 | NÜR; 1; 6 | NÜR; 2 C | MNZ; 1; 5 | MNZ; 2; 9 | CAT; 1; 9 | CAT; 2; 19 | 3rd | 285 |

^{†} Driver did not finish, but was classified as he completed over 75% of the race distance.

=== Complete TCR Malaysia Touring Car Championship results ===
(key) (Races in bold indicate pole position) (Races in italics indicate fastest lap)

| Year | Team | Car | 1 | 2 | 3 | 4 | 5 | 6 | DC | Points |
|---|---|---|---|---|---|---|---|---|---|---|
| 2020 | Solite Indigo Racing | Hyundai i30 N TCR | SEP1; 1 | SEP1; 2 | SEP2; 1; 4 | SEP2; 2; 3 | | | 4th | 55 |
| 2020 | Solite Indigo Racing | Hyundai Veloster N TCR | | | | | SEP3; 1; 7 | SEP3; 2; 2 | 4th | 55 |

=== Complete World Touring Car Cup results ===
(key) (Races in bold indicate pole position) (Races in italics indicate fastest lap)

| Year | Team | Car | 1 | 2 | 3 | 4 | 5 | 6 | 7 | 8 | 9 | 10 | 11 | 12 | 13 | 14 | 15 | 16 | DC | Points |
|---|---|---|---|---|---|---|---|---|---|---|---|---|---|---|---|---|---|---|---|---|
| 2020 | Engstler Hyundai N Liqui Moly Racing Team | Hyundai i30 N TCR | BEL; 1 | BEL; 2 | GER; 1 | GER; 2 | SVK; 1 | SVK; 2 | SVK; 3 | HUN; 1 | HUN; 2 | HUN; 3 | ESP; 1; 16 | ESP; 2; 14 | ESP; 3; 10 | ARA; 1 | ARA; 2 | ARA; 3 | 21st | 9 |

Sporting positions
| Preceded by ? | Thoroughbred Sports Cars; Class C Champion; 2010 | Succeeded by ? |
| Preceded by Jack Goff | Renault Clio Cup United Kingdom; Champion; 2013 | Succeeded by Mike Bushell |
| Preceded by Oscar Nogués | Eurocup Clio; Champion; 2013 | Succeeded by Oscar Nogués |
| Preceded by Inaugural | ADAC TCR Germany; Touring Car Championship; Champion; 2016-2017 | Succeeded by Harald Proczyk |
| Preceded by Inaugural | TCR Middle East Series; Champion; 2017 | Succeeded by Luca Engstler |
| Preceded by Mikel Azcona | TCR Europe Touring Car Series; Champion; 2019 | Succeeded by Mehdi Bennani |
