= 2011 Renault Clio Cup United Kingdom =

The 2011 AirAsia Renault Clio Cup United Kingdom season will begin at Brands Hatch on 3 April and will finish after 16 races over 8 events at Brands Hatch on 2 October. The season will support rounds of the British Touring Car Championship. On 28 February, AirAsia X was announced as title sponsor to the series in a three-year deal.

== Rule changes ==
The 2011 season will see several rules introduced in an effort to cut costs for competitors to an annual budget of approximately £60,000. These changes including a reduction in the number of rounds from 20 to 16, a reduction in tyre allocation from 60 slick tyres per year to 48 and a reduction of official test days and a freedom of test venue introduced.

== Teams and drivers ==
| Team | No. | Drivers | Class | Rounds |
|---|---|---|---|---|
| Scuderia Vittoria | 0 | (Australia) Ash Miller | G | 8 |
| Scuderia Vittoria | 6 | United Kingdom Chris Smith | G | 8 |
| Scuderia Vittoria | 11 | United Kingdom Matt Allison | | 1–6 |
| Scuderia Vittoria | 11 | United Kingdom Ant Whorton-Eales | G | 7–8 |
| Scuderia Vittoria | 41 | United Kingdom Luke Wright | G | All |
| Westbourne Motorsport | 2 | United Kingdom James Colburn | G | All |
| Total Control Racing | 3 | United Kingdom James Dixon | G | All |
| Total Control Racing | 8 | United Kingdom Andy Jordan | | 6 |
| Total Control Racing | 17 | United Kingdom Tom Grice | G | 1–5 |
| Total Control Racing | 28 | United Kingdom Nicolas Hamilton | G | All |
| Total Control Racing | 66 | United Kingdom Mark Proctor | | 1–2 |
| Total Control Racing | 66 | United Kingdom Mark Proctor | M | 4–8 |
| Team Pyro | 4 | Ireland Árón Smith | G | All |
| Team Pyro | 7 | United Kingdom Chris Swanwick | G | 1–5 |
| Team Pyro | 7 | Serbia Neb Bursac | | 6 |
| Team Pyro | 7 | Ireland David Dickenson | | 7–8 |
| Team Pyro | 16 | United Kingdom Adam Bonham | G | All |
| Team Pyro | 33 | United Kingdom Jack Goff | G | All |
| Team Pyro | 42 | United Kingdom Craig Currie | | 1–7 |
| Team Pyro | 99 | United Kingdom Josh Files | G | All |
| JHR Developments | 5 | United Kingdom Lee Pattison | M | 1–3 |
| JHR Developments | 5 | United Kingdom Rob Boston | | 7–8 |
| 20Ten Racing | 10 | United Kingdom Darren Wilson | M | All |
| 20Ten Racing | 18 | United Kingdom Andy Gorton | | 7–8 |
| 20Ten Racing | 27 | United Kingdom Tim Sweet | | 6 |
| Handy Motorsport | 12 | United Kingdom Simon Belcher | M | 8 |
| Get On Track Developments | 13 | United Kingdom Jake Packun | G | All |
| Stancombe Vehicle Engineering | 15 | United Kingdom Matthew Munson | | 2 |
| Stancombe Vehicle Engineering | 22 | United Kingdom Paul Rivett | | All |
| Stancombe Vehicle Engineering | 23 | United Kingdom Mark Gibbons | M | 7 |

| Icon | Class |
|---|---|
| G | Graduate Cup |
| M | Masters Cup |

== Race calendar and results ==
The 2011 ToCA calendar was announced on 8 September 2010. Renault have subsequently announced that the Clio Cup will support the BTCC at eight meetings. Two non-championship races were held at the World Series by Renault meeting at Silverstone in conjunction with the Dutch Clio Cup. Luke Wright won both races for the Scuderia Vittoria team, but he was the only full-time competitor from the British series to take part.

| Round | | Circuit | Date | Pole position | Fastest lap | Winning driver | Winning team |
|---|---|---|---|---|---|---|---|
| 1 | R1 | Brands Hatch, Kent | 2 April | United Kingdom Jake Packun | United Kingdom Paul Rivett | United Kingdom James Dixon | Total Control Racing |
| 1 | R2 | Brands Hatch, Kent | 3 April | United Kingdom Paul Rivett | United Kingdom Paul Rivett | United Kingdom Paul Rivett | Stancombe Vehicle Engineering |
| 2 | R3 | Donington Park, Leicestershire | 16 April | United Kingdom James Dixon | United Kingdom Paul Rivett | United Kingdom Paul Rivett | Stancombe Vehicle Engineering |
| 2 | R4 | Donington Park, Leicestershire | 17 April | United Kingdom James Dixon | United Kingdom Paul Rivett | United Kingdom James Dixon | Total Control Racing |
| 3 | R5 | Thruxton Circuit, Hampshire | 30 April | Ireland Árón Smith | United Kingdom Tom Grice | Ireland Árón Smith | Team Pyro |
| 3 | R6 | Thruxton Circuit, Hampshire | 1 May | Ireland Árón Smith | United Kingdom Paul Rivett | Ireland Árón Smith | Team Pyro |
| 4 | R7 | Oulton Park, Cheshire | 4 June | United Kingdom James Dixon | Ireland Árón Smith | United Kingdom James Dixon | Total Control Racing |
| 4 | R8 | Oulton Park, Cheshire | 5 June | United Kingdom James Dixon | United Kingdom Tom Grice | United Kingdom Jack Goff | Team Pyro |
| 5 | R9 | Croft Circuit, North Yorkshire | 18 June | United Kingdom Matt Allison | United Kingdom James Colburn | United Kingdom Matt Allison | Scuderia Vittoria |
| 5 | R10 | Croft Circuit, North Yorkshire | 19 June | United Kingdom Matt Allison | United Kingdom James Colburn | United Kingdom Matt Allison | Scuderia Vittoria |
| 6 | R11 | Snetterton Motor Racing Circuit, Norfolk | 6 August | United Kingdom James Colburn | United Kingdom James Colburn | United Kingdom James Dixon | Total Control Racing |
| 6 | R12 | Snetterton Motor Racing Circuit, Norfolk | 7 August | Ireland Árón Smith | United Kingdom James Colburn | Ireland Árón Smith | Team Pyro |
| 7 | R13 | Rockingham Motor Speedway, Northamptonshire | 17 September | United Kingdom Jack Goff | United Kingdom Josh Files | United Kingdom Jack Goff | Team Pyro |
| 7 | R14 | Rockingham Motor Speedway, Northamptonshire | 18 September | United Kingdom Jack Goff | United Kingdom James Colburn | United Kingdom Jack Goff | Team Pyro |
| 8 | R15 | Brands Hatch, Kent | 1 October | United Kingdom Paul Rivett | United Kingdom Ant Whorton-Eales | United Kingdom James Colburn | Westbourne Motorsport |
| 8 | R16 | Brands Hatch, Kent | 2 October | United Kingdom Paul Rivett | United Kingdom Paul Rivett | United Kingdom Paul Rivett | Stancombe Vehicle Engineering |

== Championship standings ==
=== Drivers' Championship ===
| Pos | Driver | BHI | | DON | | THR | | OUL | | CRO | | SNE | | ROC | | BHGP | | Pen | Pts |
|---|---|---|---|---|---|---|---|---|---|---|---|---|---|---|---|---|---|---|---|
| 1 | United Kingdom Paul Rivett | 3 | 1 | 1 | 3 | 12 | 2 | 5 | 7 | 6 | 10 | 6 | 4 | 7 | 8 | 2 | 1 | 2 | 356 |
| 2 | Ireland Árón Smith | 6 | 3 | 7 | 10 | 1 | 1 | 6 | 2 | 3 | 8 | Ret | 1 | 3 | 5 | 3 | 3 | | 348 |
| 3 | United Kingdom James Colburn | 4 | 8 | 6 | 6 | 2 | Ret | 2 | 4 | 2 | 3 | 10 | 3 | 5 | 3 | 1 | 4 | | 348 |
| 4 | United Kingdom James Dixon | 1 | 13 | 2 | 1 | 4 | 6 | 1 | 3 | 5 | Ret | 1 | Ret | 6 | 2 | 10 | 6 | | 324 |
| 5 | United Kingdom Jack Goff | Ret | 2 | 13 | 11 | 6 | 3 | 3 | 1 | Ret | 4 | 9 | 2 | 1 | 1 | Ret | DNS | | 272 |
| 6 | United Kingdom Jake Packun | 2 | Ret | 3 | 4 | 5 | 10 | 10 | Ret | 4 | 5 | 5 | 9 | 4 | Ret | 4 | 2 | 8 | 255 |
| 7 | United Kingdom Josh Files | 9 | 12 | 11 | 8 | 8 | 11 | 9 | Ret | 10 | 12 | 3 | 6 | 2 | Ret | 6 | 5 | 3 | 209 |
| 8 | United Kingdom Adam Bonham | 7 | 9 | 4 | 9 | 13 | 4 | 8 | 6 | Ret | DNS | 4 | 7 | Ret | 9 | 7 | 11 | 2 | 198 |
| 9 | United Kingdom Matt Allison | Ret | 4 | 5 | 5 | Ret | Ret | 7 | 12 | 1 | 1 | Ret | 5 | | | | | 3 | 168 |
| 10 | United Kingdom Tom Grice | 10 | 6 | 8 | Ret | 3 | 7 | 4 | 9 | 9 | 6 | | | | | | | 2 | 150 |
| 11 | United Kingdom Luke Wright | Ret | 10 | 10 | 7 | Ret | DNS | 11 | 13 | Ret | 2 | 2 | 10 | Ret | 4 | Ret | DNS | | 145 |
| 12 | United Kingdom Craig Currie | 11 | 11 | 12 | Ret | 9 | 9 | 12 | 5 | 12 | 11 | 8 | 11 | 10 | Ret | | | | 136 |
| 13 | United Kingdom Darren Wilson | Ret | 14 | 16 | 16 | 11 | 12 | 16 | 8 | 8 | 9 | 11 | 14 | 13 | 11 | 17 | 14 | 2 | 127 |
| 14 | United Kingdom Nicolas Hamilton | 12 | 15 | 17 | 14 | 10 | 13 | 15 | Ret | 11 | Ret | 14 | 13 | 14 | 14 | 9 | 10 | | 113 |
| 15 | United Kingdom Mark Proctor | Ret | Ret | 15 | 15 | | | 14 | 11 | 7 | 7 | 12 | 12 | 12 | 12 | 14 | Ret | | 105 |
| 16 | United Kingdom Chris Swanwick | 8 | 7 | 9 | 12 | 7 | 8 | 13 | 10 | Ret | Ret | | | | | | | | 100 |
| 17 | United Kingdom Lee Pattison | 5 | 5 | Ret | 2 | Ret | 5 | | | | | | | | | | | 3 | 85 |
| 18 | United Kingdom Ant Whorton-Eales | | | | | | | | | | | | | 8 | 7 | 5 | 7 | | 68 |
| 19 | United Kingdom Rob Boston | | | | | | | | | | | | | 9 | 10 | 8 | 8 | | 51 |
| 20 | Ireland David Dickenson | | | | | | | | | | | | | 11 | 6 | 13 | 9 | | 49 |
| 21 | Serbia Neb Bursac | | | | | | | | | | | 7 | 8 | | | | | | 30 |
| 22 | United Kingdom Andy Gorton | | | | | | | | | | | | | 15 | 13 | 15 | 12 | | 30 |
| 23 | United Kingdom Matthew Munson | | | 14 | 13 | | | | | | | | | | | | | | 15 |
| 24 | United Kingdom Tim Sweet | | | | | | | | | | | 13 | 15 | | | | | | 14 |
| 25 | United Kingdom Simon Belcher | | | | | | | | | | | | | | | 16 | 15 | | 13 |
| 26 | United Kingdom Chris Smith | | | | | | | | | | | | | | | 11 | Ret | | 10 |
| 27 | United Kingdom Mark Gibbons | | | | | | | | | | | | | 16 | Ret | | | | 5 |
| | United Kingdom Andy Jordan | | | | | | | | | | | Ret | DNS | | | | | | 0 |
Guest driver ineligible for points
| | Australia Ash Miller | | | | | | | | | | | | | | | 12 | 13 | | 0 |
| Pos | Driver | BHI | | DON | | THR | | OUL | | CRO | | SNE | | ROC | | BHGP | | Pen | Pts |

| Colour | Result |
|---|---|
| Gold | Winner |
| Silver | Second place |
| Bronze | Third place |
| Green | Points classification |
| Blue | Non-points classification |
| Blue | Non-classified finish (NC) |
| Purple | Retired, not classified (Ret) |
| Red | Did not qualify (DNQ) |
| Red | Did not pre-qualify (DNPQ) |
| Black | Disqualified (DSQ) |
| White | Did not start (DNS) |
| White | Withdrew (WD) |
| White | Race cancelled (C) |
| Blank | Did not practice (DNP) |
| Blank | Did not arrive (DNA) |
| Blank | Excluded (EX) |

=== Entrants' Championship ===
| Pos | Entrant | BHI | | DON | | THR | | OUL | | CRO | | SNE | | ROC | | BHGP | | Pts |
|---|---|---|---|---|---|---|---|---|---|---|---|---|---|---|---|---|---|---|
| 1 | Team Pyro | 6 | 2 | 4 | 8 | 1 | 1 | 3 | 1 | 3 | 4 | 3 | 1 | 1 | 1 | 3 | 3 | 740 |
| 1 | Team Pyro | 7 | 3 | 7 | 9 | 6 | 3 | 6 | 2 | 10 | 8 | 4 | 2 | 2 | 5 | 6 | 5 | 740 |
| 2 | Total Control Racing | 1 | 6 | 2 | 1 | 3 | 6 | 1 | 3 | 5 | 6 | 1 | 12 | 6 | 2 | 9 | 6 | 566 |
| 2 | Total Control Racing | 10 | 13 | 8 | 14 | 4 | 7 | 4 | 9 | 7 | 7 | 12 | 13 | 12 | 12 | 10 | 10 | 566 |
| 3 | Scuderia Vittoria | Ret | 4 | 5 | 5 | Ret | Ret | 7 | 12 | 1 | 1 | 2 | 5 | 8 | 4 | 5 | 7 | 392 |
| 3 | Scuderia Vittoria | Ret | 10 | 10 | 7 | Ret | DNS | 11 | 13 | Ret | 2 | Ret | 10 | Ret | 7 | 11 | Ret | 392 |
| 4 | Stancombe Vehicle Engineering | 3 | 1 | 1 | 3 | 12 | 2 | 5 | 7 | 6 | 10 | 6 | 4 | 7 | 8 | 2 | 1 | 366 |
| 4 | Stancombe Vehicle Engineering | | | 14 | 13 | | | | | | | | | 16 | Ret | | | 366 |
| 5 | Westbourne Motorsport | 4 | 8 | 6 | 6 | 2 | Ret | 2 | 4 | 2 | 3 | 10 | 3 | 5 | 3 | 1 | 4 | 338 |
| 6 | Get On Track Developments | 2 | Ret | 3 | 4 | 5 | 10 | 10 | Ret | 4 | 5 | 5 | 9 | 4 | Ret | 4 | 2 | 263 |
| 7 | 20Ten Racing | Ret | 14 | 16 | 16 | 11 | 12 | 16 | 8 | 8 | 9 | 11 | 14 | 13 | 11 | 15 | 12 | 170 |
| 7 | 20Ten Racing | | | | | | | | | | | 13 | 15 | 15 | 13 | 17 | 14 | 170 |
| 8 | JHR Developments | 5 | 5 | Ret | 2 | Ret | 5 | | | | | | | 9 | 10 | 8 | 8 | 139 |
| 9 | Handy Motorsport | | | | | | | | | | | | | | | 16 | 15 | 11 |
| Pos | Entrant | BHI | | DON | | THR | | OUL | | CRO | | SNE | | ROC | | BHGP | | Pts |

| Colour | Result |
|---|---|
| Gold | Winner |
| Silver | Second place |
| Bronze | Third place |
| Green | Points classification |
| Blue | Non-points classification |
| Blue | Non-classified finish (NC) |
| Purple | Retired, not classified (Ret) |
| Red | Did not qualify (DNQ) |
| Red | Did not pre-qualify (DNPQ) |
| Black | Disqualified (DSQ) |
| White | Did not start (DNS) |
| White | Withdrew (WD) |
| White | Race cancelled (C) |
| Blank | Did not practice (DNP) |
| Blank | Did not arrive (DNA) |
| Blank | Excluded (EX) |
