= 2012 Renault UK Clio Cup =

The 2012 AirAsia Renault Clio Cup UK season is a multi-event, one make motor racing championship held across England. The championship features a mix of professional motor racing teams and privately funded drivers, competing in a Clio Renault Sport 200 that conform to the technical regulations for the championship. It forms part of the extensive program of support categories built up around the BTCC centrepiece.

This season is the 17th Renault Clio Cup United Kingdom season. The season commenced on 31 March at Brands Hatch – on the circuit's Indy configuration – and will conclude on 21 October at the same venue, utilising the Grand Prix circuit, after sixteen races to be held at eight meetings, all in support of the 2012 British Touring Car Championship.

== Regulation changes ==
The only change from 2011 to the technical regulations will be a weight increase of 15 kg (33 lb) to a total minimum weight of 1,165 kg (2,568 lb).

== Teams and drivers ==
A 23-driver entry list was released by series organisers on 20 March 2012.

Team	No.	Drivers	Class	Rounds
Stancombe Vehicle Engineering	1	(United Kingdom) Adam Gould		1–3
Stancombe Vehicle Engineering	22	(United Kingdom) Paul Rivett		All
Westbourne Motorsport	2	(United Kingdom) James Colburn		All
Westbourne Motorsport	10	(United Kingdom) Ant Whorton-Eales	R	All
Westbourne Motorsport	17	(United Kingdom) Will Davison	R	All
Scuderia Vittoria	3	(United Kingdom) James Dixon		1–3
Scuderia Vittoria	5	(United Kingdom) Stefan Hodgetts		4–8
Scuderia Vittoria	7	(United Kingdom) Vic Covey, Jr.		All
Scuderia Vittoria	8	(United Kingdom) Finlay Crocker	M	All
Scuderia Vittoria	9	(United Kingdom) Ronnie Klos	M	All
Scuderia Vittoria	41	(United States) Russell Lee Gordon		1–3
Total Control Racing	3	(United Kingdom) James Dixon		4–8
Total Control Racing	28	(United Kingdom) Nicolas Hamilton		All
Total Control Racing	37	(United Kingdom) Rob Smith	R	All
Team Pyro	4	(United Kingdom) Adam Bonham		All
Team Pyro	6	(United Kingdom) David Dickenson		7–8
Team Pyro	33	(United Kingdom) Jack Goff		All
Team Pyro	88	(Sweden) Kim Andersson	R	1–4
Team Pyro	99	(United Kingdom) Josh Files		All
Handy Motorsport with Pyro	11	(United Kingdom) Simon Belcher	M	All
Juta Racing	13	(Lithuania) Tautvydas Barštys		1–6, 8
Juta Racing	55	(Lithuania) Ignas Gelžinis	R	All
20Ten Racing	20	(United Kingdom) Darren Wilson	M	1–6
20Ten Racing	25	(United Kingdom) Graham Field	M	7–8
20Ten Racing	66	(United Kingdom) Josh Cook	R	All
MBR	21	(United Kingdom) Mike Bushell	R	All
Silver Fox Racing	27	(United Kingdom) Mark Tilbury	R	1, 5, 8
Finesse Motorsport	31	(United Kingdom) Aaron Williamson	R	1–5
Finesse Motorsport	77	(United Kingdom) Jake Giddings	R	All
Team HARD.	34	(United Kingdom) David Grady		5
20Ten/Team HARD.	50	(United Kingdom) Andy Wilmot		8

Icon	Class
M	Masters Cup
R	Rookie Cup

== Race calendar and results ==
The 2012 calendar supports the BTCC at all rounds, with no major changes from 2011.

Round		Circuit	Date	Pole position	Fastest lap	Winning driver	Winning team
1	R1	Brands Hatch (Indy), Kent	31 March	(United Kingdom) Josh Files	(United Kingdom) James Dixon	(United Kingdom) Jack Goff	Team Pyro
1	R2	Brands Hatch (Indy), Kent	1 April	(United Kingdom) Josh Files	(United Kingdom) Adam Bonham	(United Kingdom) Paul Rivett	Stancombe Vehicle Engineering
2	R3	Donington Park (National), Leicestershire	15 April	(United Kingdom) Paul Rivett	(United Kingdom) Adam Bonham	(United Kingdom) Paul Rivett	Stancombe Vehicle Engineering
2	R4	Donington Park (National), Leicestershire	15 April	(United Kingdom) Paul Rivett	(Sweden) Kim Andersson	(United Kingdom) Jack Goff	Team Pyro
3	R5	Thruxton Circuit, Hampshire	28 April	(United Kingdom) Adam Bonham	(United Kingdom) Josh Files	(United Kingdom) James Colburn	Westbourne Motorsport
3	R6	Thruxton Circuit, Hampshire	29 April	(United Kingdom) James Colburn	(United Kingdom) James Dixon	(United Kingdom) James Colburn	Westbourne Motorsport
4	R7	Oulton Park (Island), Cheshire	9 June	(United Kingdom) Stefan Hodgetts	(United Kingdom) Jack Goff	(United Kingdom) Stefan Hodgetts	Scuderia Vittoria
4	R8	Oulton Park (Island), Cheshire	10 June	(United Kingdom) Stefan Hodgetts	(United Kingdom) Adam Bonham	(United Kingdom) Stefan Hodgetts	Scuderia Vittoria
5	R9	Snetterton (300) Circuit, Norfolk	11 August	(United Kingdom) Jack Goff	(United Kingdom) Stefan Hodgetts	(United Kingdom) Paul Rivett	Stancombe Vehicle Engineering
5	R10	Snetterton (300) Circuit, Norfolk	12 August	(United Kingdom) Jack Goff	(United Kingdom) Paul Rivett	(United Kingdom) Paul Rivett	Stancombe Vehicle Engineering
6	R11	Rockingham Motor Speedway, Northamptonshire	23 September	(United Kingdom) Jack Goff	(United Kingdom) Paul Rivett	(United Kingdom) Paul Rivett	Stancombe Vehicle Engineering
6	R12	Rockingham Motor Speedway, Northamptonshire	23 September	(United Kingdom) Jack Goff	(United Kingdom) Paul Rivett	(United Kingdom) Paul Rivett	Stancombe Vehicle Engineering
7	R13	Silverstone (National), Northamptonshire	7 October	(United Kingdom) Paul Rivett	(United Kingdom) Adam Bonham	(United Kingdom) Josh Cook	20Ten Racing
7	R14	Silverstone (National), Northamptonshire	7 October	(United Kingdom) Paul Rivett	(United Kingdom) Josh Files	(United Kingdom) Josh Cook	20Ten Racing
8	R15	Brands Hatch (GP), Kent	20 October	(United Kingdom) Josh Files	(United Kingdom) Stefan Hodgetts	(United Kingdom) Stefan Hodgetts	Scuderia Vittoria
8	R16	Brands Hatch (GP), Kent	21 October	(United Kingdom) Josh Files	(United Kingdom) Mike Bushell	(United Kingdom) Stefan Hodgetts	Scuderia Vittoria

== Championship standings ==
=== Drivers' Championship ===
Pos	Driver	BHI		DON		THR		OUL		SNE		ROC		SIL		BHGP		Pen.	Pts
1	(United Kingdom) Jack Goff	1	2	5	1	4	3	2	4	4	4	2	2	11	4	9	6		373
2	(United Kingdom) Paul Rivett	Ret	1	1	3	5	2	Ret	3	1	1	1	1	7	2	Ret	8		354
3	(United Kingdom) James Dixon	6	6	7	5	6	4	7	6	2	7	3	3	4	3	7	3	2	330
4	(United Kingdom) Adam Bonham	5	3	2	2	3	21	4	17	21	3	5	7	5	5	5	7		297
5	(United Kingdom) Josh Cook	10	Ret	8	8	9	6	3	5	6	Ret	4	4	1	1	3	4		287
6	(United Kingdom) Josh Files	2	4	9	Ret	2	13	5	2	5	5	18	5	6	10	2	Ret	2	268
7	(United Kingdom) Stefan Hodgetts							1	1	3	2	Ret	8	2	8	1	1	2	239
8	(United Kingdom) Ant Whorton-Eales	8	5	3	6	10	15	6	7	Ret	13	Ret	12	3	6	Ret	5		208
9	(United Kingdom) James Colburn	22	7	Ret	4	1	1	Ret	Ret	8	Ret	13	6	10	9	16	9		182
10	(Lithuania) Ignas Gelžinis	16	12	13	15	12	7	12	Ret	15	10	7	11	8	7	10	15		152
11	(United Kingdom) Mike Bushell	9	Ret	Ret	9	8	Ret	9	Ret	7	18	6	Ret	12	17	6	2	2	146
12	(United Kingdom) Vic Covey, Jr.	15	9	12	10	13	8	13	9	10	11	15	18	13	15	15	11		140
13	(United Kingdom) Simon Belcher	17	10	Ret	12	17	12	17	8	13	14	9	10	14	16	14	12		121
14	(United Kingdom) Jake Giddings	Ret	Ret	15	16	15	14	14	12	17	8	11	9	18	11	8	10		118
15	(United Kingdom) Aaron Williamson	3	15	Ret	14	Ret	10	8	10	14	6								99
16	(United Kingdom) Will Davison	11	Ret	10	11	18	19	10	Ret	19	9	8	17	17	13	12	Ret	2	98
17	(United Kingdom) Rob Smith	23	8	17	17	16	Ret	11	11	12	Ret	10	15	9	14	18	17	2	97
18	(Sweden) Kim Andersson	7	Ret	6	7	Ret	5	19	13										82
19	(United Kingdom) Finlay Crocker	18	13	14	18	21	11	Ret	Ret	Ret	12	12	13	20	18	11	18		74
20	(United Kingdom) Luke Wright	4	Ret	4	Ret	7	Ret												60
21	(United Kingdom) Nicolas Hamilton	13	Ret	11	21	14	18	Ret	Ret	11	Ret	Ret	14	19	Ret	13	16	6	54
22	(United Kingdom) Darren Wilson	21	11	16	Ret	20	17	16	16	16	17	16	19						46
23	(Lithuania) Tautvydas Barštys	20	16	18	20	19	20	15	14	18	15	14	16			21	19	3	46
24	(United Kingdom) David Dickenson													16	12	4	14		43
25	(United Kingdom) Ronnie Klos	19	17	19	19	Ret	16	18	15	20	Ret	17	Ret	15	19	19	13	7	40
26	(United Kingdom) Adam Gould	12	Ret	Ret	13	11	9												39
27	(United Kingdom) Mark Tilbury	14	14							22	16					20	20		21
28	(United Kingdom) David Grady									9	Ret								12
29	(United Kingdom) Andy Wilmot															17	Ret		4
30	(United Kingdom) Graham Field													21	20	22	21		1
Pos	Driver	BHI		DON		THR		OUL		SNE		ROC		SIL		BHGP		Pen.	Pts

Colour	Result
Gold	Winner
Silver	Second place
Bronze	Third place
Green	Points finish
Blue	Non-points finish
Blue	Non-classified finish (NC)
Purple	Retired (Ret)
Red	Did not qualify (DNQ)
Red	Did not pre-qualify (DNPQ)
Black	Disqualified (DSQ)
White	Did not start (DNS)
White	Withdrew (WD)
White	Race cancelled (C)
Blank	Did not practice (DNP)
Blank	Did not arrive (DNA)
Blank	Excluded (EX)
