= 2013 Eurocup Clio =

Race Season

Seasons
- ← 2012 2014 →

The 2013 Eurocup Clio season was the third season of the Renault–supported touring car category, a one-make racing series that is part of the World Series by Renault, the series uses Renault Clio RS 197's.

== Race calendar and results ==
The calendar for the 2013 season was announced on 20 October 2012, the day before the end of the 2012 season. Four rounds formed meetings of the 2013 World Series by Renault season, with additional rounds in support of the Imola round of the Italian Clio Cup, and the Alcañiz round of the International Clio Cup.

Round		Circuit	Country	Date	Pole position	Fastest lap	Winning driver	Winning team
1	R1	Autodromo Enzo e Dino Ferrari	Italy	11 May	(Italy) Massimiliano Pedalà	(Italy) Massimiliano Pedalà	(United Kingdom) Josh Files	(United Kingdom) Team Pyro
1	R2	Autodromo Enzo e Dino Ferrari	Italy	12 May	(Italy) Massimiliano Pedalà	(United Kingdom) Josh Files	(Italy) Massimiliano Pedalà	(Italy) Composit Motorsport
2	R1	Circuit de Spa-Francorchamps	Belgium	1 June	(Romania) Salvatore Arcarese	(France) Éric Trémoulet	(France) Nicolas Milan	(France) Team LMV CL Brakes
2	R2	Circuit de Spa-Francorchamps	Belgium	2 June	(Romania) Salvatore Arcarese	(France) Éric Trémoulet	(France) Nicolas Milan	(France) Team LMV CL Brakes
3	R1	Red Bull Ring	Austria	21 July	(Denmark) Thomas Fjordbach	(France) Nicolas Milan	(Italy) Massimiliano Pedalà	(Italy) Composit Motorsport
3	R2	Red Bull Ring	Austria	21 July	(Denmark) Thomas Fjordbach	(Spain) Oscar Nogués	(Italy) Massimiliano Pedalà	(Italy) Composit Motorsport
4	R1	Circuit Paul Ricard, Le Castellet	France	29 September	(France) Éric Trémoulet	(France) Éric Trémoulet	(Spain) Oscar Nogués	(Italy) RMS Engineering
4	R2	Circuit Paul Ricard, Le Castellet	France	29 September	(Spain) Oscar Nogués	(France) Éric Trémoulet	(France) Nicolas Milan	(France) Team LMV CL Brakes
5	R1	Circuit de Catalunya, Montmeló	Spain	19 October	(United Kingdom) Josh Files	(Spain) Oscar Nogués	(United Kingdom) Josh Files	(United Kingdom) Team Pyro
5	R2	Circuit de Catalunya, Montmeló	Spain	20 October	(United Kingdom) Josh Files	(Spain) Antonio Martínez	(United Kingdom) Josh Files	(United Kingdom) Team Pyro
6	R1	Ciudad del Motor de Aragón	Spain	2 November	(United Kingdom) Josh Files	(Denmark) Thomas Fjordbach	(United Kingdom) Josh Files	(United Kingdom) Team Pyro
6	R2	Ciudad del Motor de Aragón	Spain	3 November	(United Kingdom) Josh Files	(Croatia) Ivan Pulic	(Croatia) Ivan Pulic	(Slovenia) Lema Racing Team

== Championship standings ==
- Points are awarded as follows:

1st	2nd	3rd	4th	5th	6th	7th	8th	9th	10th
25	18	15	12	10	8	6	4	2	1

=== Drivers' Championship ===
Pos	Driver	IMO (Italy)		SPA (Belgium)		RBR (Austria)		LEC (France)		CAT (Spain)		ALC (Spain)		Points
1	(United Kingdom) Josh Files	1	2	8	3	5	2	2	Ret	**1**	**1**	**1**	**3**	198
2	(Italy) Massimiliano Pedalà	**3**	**1**	3	10	1	1	3	6	5	9	7	4	165
3	(France) Nicolas Milan	2	8	1	1	4	9	5	1	Ret	3	3	5	161
4	(Denmark) Thomas Fjordbach	NC	3	17	DSQ	**2**	**3**	6	3	6	7	2	2	123
5	(France) Éric Trémoulet	4	13	2	2	13	Ret	**4**	2	4	6	6	6	117
6	(Argentina) Facundo Della Motta	13	4	5	6	7	6	Ret	8	7	5	9	7	76
7	(Croatia) Ivan Pulic	6	12	15	13	8	4	16	7	12	16	4	1	70
8	(Spain) Antonio Martínez	12	16	Ret	11	16	12	Ret	Ret	2	2	5	8	50
9	(Spain) Oscar Nogués	Ret	Ret	Ret	Ret	3	13	1	**Ret**	Ret	Ret			40
10	(Spain) Gonzalo Martín de Andrés	7	7	4	4	Ret	Ret	15	DSQ	Ret	DNS			36
11	(France) Jean-Philippe Lamic	14	Ret	Ret	5	15	DNS	11	5	11	11	8	9	33
12	(United Kingdom) Daniele Perfetti	8	5	6	9	10	19†	10	Ret	18	15	10	10	31
13	(France) Xavier Fouineau	5	9	7	7									24
14	(Switzerland) Fabian Danz	Ret	DNS	29	15	14	5	9	19	15	10	12	Ret	18
15	(Republic of Ireland) David Dickenson	28	19	10	19	9	20†	12	Ret	19	4	Ret	Ret	16
16	(Italy) Michele Puccetti	Ret	6	19	22	6	18							16
17	(France) Julien Neveu	17	17	Ret	17	17	7	20	10	9	21			16
18	(Romania) Salvatore Arcarese	9	Ret	**13**	**8**	Ret	11							6
19	(Spain) Manuel Leon-Sotelo	23	20	NC	18	24†	8	24	11					4
20	(France) Patrice Garrouste	Ret	11							10	13			4
21	(Belgium) Stéphane Lémeret	Ret	DNS	9	31†									2
22	(Italy) Christian Ricciarini	10	14	11	DSQ					Ret	Ret			1
23	(Belgium) Sami Luka	19	10	28	14									1
24	(France) Denis Gibaud	25	Ret	Ret	28	18	10	25	15	29	22	Ret	17	1
25	(France) Florian Bernard	Ret	Ret	Ret	29			22	13	20	14	18	11	1
	(Monaco) Stefano Zanini	11	Ret			12	17	17	24	22	Ret			0
	(Croatia) Nikola Belohradski	16	Ret	Ret	30	11	Ret							0
	(Netherlands) René Steenmetz	20	15	Ret	12	23	21†	13	22	14	12	11	12	0
	(Italy) Sebastiano Ciato	15	18	12	Ret	19	14	14	17	Ret	19	17	18	0
	(Switzerland) Christian Jaquillard	22	21	14	20	22	16	29	16	27	20			0
	(Russia) Andrey Artyushin	29	26	20	25	20	15	32	27	28	23	20	21	0
	(France) Florent Petit	18	Ret	23	24			27	20	16	18	16	15	0
	(Morocco) Youssaf El Marnissi	Ret	23	18	16			23	23	Ret	Ret	14	14	0
	(France) Christophe Bruyere	21	Ret	16	Ret			26	25					0
	(France) François Bernard	30†	25	27	32			28	18	24	25	Ret	Ret	0
	(France) Jacques Fabregat	27	24	22	21			Ret	Ret	21	26			0
	(France) Cyril Petit	24	Ret	21	27			31	21	25	24	19	19	0
	(United Kingdom) Steve Parish	26	22	26	23	21	DSQ	30	28	26	Ret	20	21	0
	(France) Emmanuel Raffin			24	Ret									0
	(Portugal) Carlos Antunes Tavares			25	26									0
Guest drivers ineligible for points
	(Italy) Simone di Luca							7	4	3	Ret			0
	(Italy) Ronnie Marchetti							8	9					0
	(Spain) Pablo Martin							18	12	8	Ret			0
	(Czech Republic) Tomáš Pekař									23	8	13	13	0
	(Spain) Raquel Morera							21	26	13	17			0
	(France) Benoît Carreras							19	14					0
	(Brazil) Pablo Henrique Martin											15	16	0
	(Italy) Luciano Gioia									17	Ret			0
	(Slovenia) Jure Marinsek							33	Ret					0
Pos	Driver	IMO (Italy)		SPA (Belgium)		RBR (Austria)		LEC (France)		CAT (Spain)		ALC (Spain)		Points

Colour	Result
Gold	Winner
Silver	Second place
Bronze	Third place
Green	Points classification
Blue	Non-points classification
Blue	Non-classified finish (NC)
Purple	Retired, not classified (Ret)
Red	Did not qualify (DNQ)
Red	Did not pre-qualify (DNPQ)
Black	Disqualified (DSQ)
White	Did not start (DNS)
White	Withdrew (WD)
White	Race cancelled (C)
Blank	Did not practice (DNP)
Blank	Did not arrive (DNA)
Blank	Excluded (EX)

**Bold** – Pole
Italics – Fastest Lap
