= 2013 Renault UK Clio Cup =

The 2013 Renault UK Clio Cup is a multi-event, one make motor racing championship held across England. The championship features a mix of professional motor racing teams and privately funded drivers, competing in a Clio Renault Sport 200 that conform to the technical regulations for the championship. 2013 will be the final season for the current car. It forms part of the extensive program of support categories built up around the BTCC centrepiece.

This season will be the 18th Renault Clio Cup United Kingdom season. The season will commence on 31 March at Brands Hatch – on the circuit's Indy configuration – and will conclude on 13 October at the same venue, utilising the Grand Prix circuit, after sixteen races to be held at eight meetings, all in support of the 2013 British Touring Car Championship.

== Championship changes ==
After a single year with the SRO as series promoter in 2012, the championship is returning to the hands of the British Automobile Racing Club with Simon North making a return to the role of Championship Manager. A post he held between 1992 and 2011. Further changes include a switch to Dunlop Tyres for the 2013 season, after several years using Michelin rubber.

== Teams and drivers ==
Team	No.	Drivers	Class	Rounds
Team Pyro	1	(United Kingdom) Alex Morgan		All
Team Pyro	3	(United Kingdom) Ash Hand	G	All
Team Pyro	88	(United Kingdom) James Nutbrown	G	1–7
Team Pyro	99	(United Kingdom) Josh Files	G	All
Westbourne Motorsport	2	(United Kingdom) James Colburn	G	All
Westbourne Motorsport	21	(United Kingdom) Mike Bushell		1–3
Westbourne Motorsport	28	(Malta) Jacques Mizzi	G	All
Westbourne Motorsport	92	(United Kingdom) Jordan Stilp	G	All
Scuderia Vittoria	4	(United Kingdom) Joshua Wakefield	G	All
Scuderia Vittoria	5	(United Kingdom) Stefan Hodgetts		All
Scuderia Vittoria	7	(United Kingdom) Devon Modell	G	All
Scuderia Vittoria	8	(United Kingdom) Finlay Crocker	M	All
Scuderia Vittoria	9	(United Kingdom) Ronnie Klos	M	All
Scuderia Vittoria	10	(United Kingdom) Ant Whorton-Eales	G	All
Scuderia Vittoria	21	(United Kingdom) Mike Bushell		4–6
Stancombe Vehicle Engineering	6	(United Kingdom) Martin Byford	M	8
Stancombe Vehicle Engineering	22	(United Kingdom) Paul Rivett		1–7
Handy Motorsport with Pyro	11	(United Kingdom) Simon Belcher	M	All
Juta Racing	13	(Lithuania) Tautvydas Barštys		1–2, 4, 6–8
Juta Racing	55	(Lithuania) Ignas Gelžinis	G	All
MBR; MBR with Team Pyro	21	(United Kingdom) Mike Bushell		7–8
JHR	24	(United Kingdom) Lee Pattison	M	2–8
JHR	66	(United Kingdom) Josh Cook	G	All
20Ten Racing	25	(United Kingdom) Graham Field	M	All
20Ten Racing	26	(United Kingdom) Peter Felix	M	7
Team AWR	31	(United Kingdom) Aaron Williamson	G	1–6, 8
Total Control Racing	37	(United Kingdom) Rob Smith	G	All
SRC Recycling	50	(United Kingdom) Luke Herbert		7–8
Finesse Motorsport	77	(United Kingdom) Jake Giddings	G	All

Icon	Class
M	Masters Cup
G	Graduate Cup

== Race calendar and results ==
The championship calendar was announced by the series organisers on 7 December 2012.

Round		Circuit	Date	Pole position	Fastest lap	Winning driver	Winning team
1	R1	Brands Hatch (Indy Circuit, Kent)	31 March	(United Kingdom) Mike Bushell	(United Kingdom) Josh Files	(United Kingdom) James Colburn	Westbourne Motorsport
1	R2	Brands Hatch (Indy Circuit, Kent)	31 March	(United Kingdom) James Colburn	(United Kingdom) Josh Files	(United Kingdom) Alex Morgan	Team Pyro
2	R3	Donington Park (National Circuit, Leicestershire)	20 April	(United Kingdom) Paul Rivett	(United Kingdom) Josh Files	(United Kingdom) Paul Rivett	Stancombe Vehicle Engineering
2	R4	Donington Park (National Circuit, Leicestershire)	21 April	(United Kingdom) Josh Files	(United Kingdom) Paul Rivett	(United Kingdom) Paul Rivett	Stancombe Vehicle Engineering
3	R5	Thruxton Circuit (Hampshire)	4 May	(United Kingdom) Lee Pattison	(United Kingdom) Paul Rivett	(United Kingdom) Lee Pattison	JHR
3	R6	Thruxton Circuit (Hampshire)	5 May	(United Kingdom) Stefan Hodgetts	(United Kingdom) Josh Cook	(United Kingdom) Stefan Hodgetts	Scuderia Vittoria
4	R7	Oulton Park (Island Circuit, Cheshire)	8 June	(United Kingdom) Paul Rivett	(United Kingdom) Stefan Hodgetts	(United Kingdom) Paul Rivett	Stancombe Vehicle Engineering
4	R8	Oulton Park (Island Circuit, Cheshire)	9 June	(United Kingdom) Paul Rivett	(United Kingdom) Josh Files	(United Kingdom) Stefan Hodgetts	Scuderia Vittoria
5	R9	Croft Circuit (North Yorkshire)	22 June	(United Kingdom) Josh Files	(United Kingdom) Josh Files	(United Kingdom) Josh Files	Team Pyro
5	R10	Croft Circuit (North Yorkshire)	23 June	(United Kingdom) Josh Files	(United Kingdom) Mike Bushell	(United Kingdom) Stefan Hodgetts	Scuderia Vittoria
6	R11	Snetterton Motor Racing Circuit (300 Circuit, Norfolk)	3 August	(United Kingdom) Josh Files	(United Kingdom) Josh Files	(United Kingdom) Paul Rivett	Stancombe Vehicle Engineering
6	R12	Snetterton Motor Racing Circuit (300 Circuit, Norfolk)	4 August	(United Kingdom) Josh Files	(United Kingdom) Josh Files	(United Kingdom) Josh Files	Team Pyro
7	R13	Rockingham Motor Speedway (International Super Sports Car Circuit, Northamptonshire)	14 September	(United Kingdom) Stefan Hodgetts	(United Kingdom) Josh Files	(United Kingdom) Stefan Hodgetts	Scuderia Vittoria
7	R14	Rockingham Motor Speedway (International Super Sports Car Circuit, Northamptonshire)	15 September	(United Kingdom) Stefan Hodgetts	(United Kingdom) Josh Files	(United Kingdom) Ant Whorton-Eales	Scuderia Vittoria
8	R15	Brands Hatch (Grand Prix Circuit, Kent)	12 October	(United Kingdom) James Colburn	(United Kingdom) Josh Cook	(United Kingdom) James Colburn	Westbourne Motorsport
8	R16	Brands Hatch (Grand Prix Circuit, Kent)	13 October	(United Kingdom) James Colburn	(United Kingdom) Josh Cook	(United Kingdom) Josh Cook	JHR

== Championship standings ==
=== Drivers' Championship ===
Pos	Driver	BHI		DON		THR		OUL		CRO		SNE		ROC		BHGP		Pen.	Pts
1	(United Kingdom) Josh Files	11*	4	2	2	2	3	7	10	1	3	2	1	3	2	4	5	2	384
2	(United Kingdom) Alex Morgan	4	1	4	3	3	12*	4	2	8	7	4	6	5	8	2	4		330
3	(United Kingdom) Paul Rivett	5	2	1	1	4	9	1	3	5	16	1	4	Ret*	6				304
4	(United Kingdom) James Colburn	1	3	7	8	7	7	6	7	9*	4	9	3	6	4	1	7		300
5	(United Kingdom) Josh Cook	2	Ret*	12	13	5	4	3	6	3	11	3	5	8	12	5	1	3	288
6	(United Kingdom) Stefan Hodgetts	18	7	8	Ret*	Ret	1	2	1	2	1	Ret	2	1	17	3	Ret		276
7	(United Kingdom) Ant Whorton-Eales	6	5	11	5	DNS*	DNS	Ret	8	7	2	7	10	2	1	7	3	6	248
8	(United Kingdom) Lee Pattison	*		9	7	1	2	5	5	4	5	12	8	7	16	12	Ret		223
9	(United Kingdom) Ash Hand	10	12	10	14	8	8	10	Ret*	6	6	5	7	9	3	6	10	2	213
10	(United Kingdom) Jake Giddings	7	8	13	4	6	11	8	4	Ret*	10	14	15	14	5	9	6		205
11	(United Kingdom) Mike Bushell	3	9	3	Ret*	9	6	9	11	Ret	8	8	9	Ret	DNS	8	2	5	193
12	(United Kingdom) Devon Modell	13	11	Ret*	12	17	5	12	12	Ret	DNS	6	14	4	9	Ret	12	2	135
13	(United Kingdom) Jordan Stilp	15	10	5	20	10	10	11	13	20	Ret*	11	19	11	7	11	Ret	2	125
14	(United Kingdom) Rob Smith	9	6	Ret*	10	12	17	15	9	15	Ret	17	12	12	Ret	Ret	14		107
15	(Lithuania) Ignas Gelžinis	12	Ret*	Ret	15	14	15	16	15	12	12	16	13	10	Ret	10	8		106
16	(United Kingdom) James Nutbrown	14	16	6	11	11	14	13	Ret*	14	9	10	Ret	20	Ret				96
17	(United Kingdom) Joshua Wakefield	Ret*	13	15	9	15	16	20	16	10	Ret	13	11	DSQ	DSQ	13	9	9	83
18	(United Kingdom) Simon Belcher	Ret*	17	16	17	13	13	14	14	13	17	19	17	Ret	18	19	16		71
19	(United Kingdom) Aaron Williamson	8	Ret*	14	6	Ret	DNS	Ret	Ret	18	Ret	15	16			14	11		70
20	(United Kingdom) Finlay Crocker	17	15	Ret*	18	18	20	Ret	Ret	11	13	20	Ret	15	15	15	Ret		54
21	(Malta) Jacques Mizzi	16	19	17	16	19	19	17	17	17	14	22	Ret*	18	11	Ret	DNS	2	50
22	(Lithuania) Tautvydas Barstys	19	14	Ret*	19			19	19			18	Ret	16	14	17	17		38
23	(United Kingdom) Ronnie Klos	Ret*	Ret	19	Ret	16	18	18	Ret	16	Ret	Ret	Ret	17	Ret	18	15		31
24	(United Kingdom) Graham Field	20	18	18	21*	20	21	21	18	19	15	21	18	19	19	20	18		30
25	(United Kingdom) Peter Felix													13	10				19
26	(United Kingdom) Luke Herbert													Ret	13	16	Ret		13
27	(United Kingdom) Martin Byford															Ret	13		8
Pos	Driver	BHI		DON		THR		OUL		CRO		SNE		ROC		BHGP		Pen.	Pts

Colour	Result
Gold	Winner
Silver	Second place
Bronze	Third place
Green	Points finish
Blue	Non-points finish
Blue	Non-classified finish (NC)
Purple	Retired (Ret)
Red	Did not qualify (DNQ)
Red	Did not pre-qualify (DNPQ)
Black	Disqualified (DSQ)
White	Did not start (DNS)
White	Withdrew (WD)
White	Race cancelled (C)
Blank	Did not practice (DNP)
Blank	Did not arrive (DNA)
Blank	Excluded (EX)

(*) Drivers drop lowest race result (excluding DSQ)
