= Giacomo Altoè =

Italian Ferrari racing driver (born 2000)

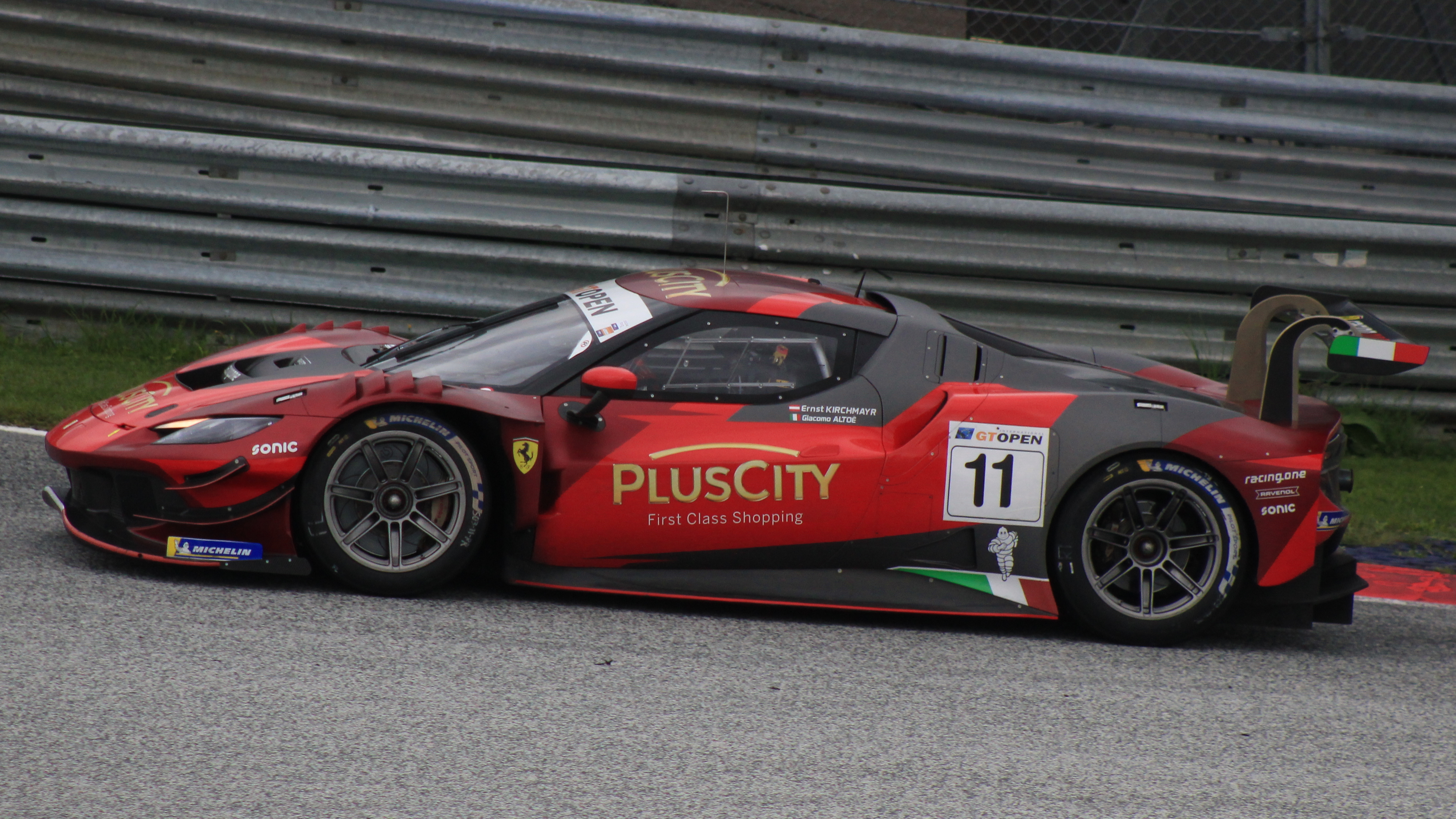
- Altoè in 2024
- Nationality: Italian
- Born: 5 October 2000 (age 26) Adria, Italy

TCR International Series career
- Debut season: 2017
- Current team: M1RA
- Categorisation: FIA Silver (until 2019); FIA Gold (2020–)
- Car number: 9
- Former teams: WestCoast Racing
- Starts: 16
- Wins: 0
- Poles: 0
- Fastest laps: 0
- Best finish: 13th in 2017

Previous series
- 2017 2016 2015: TCR Middle East Series; Italian F4 Championship; Karting

Giacomo Altoè (born 5 October 2000) is an Italian racing driver competing in the IMSA SportsCar Championship for DragonSpeed.

Altoè is the 2018 Lamborghini Super Trofeo Europe and World Final champion, 2018 Italian GT champion, 2019 International GT Open champion and 2024 Ferrari Challenge Europe champion.

== Racing career ==
Altoè began his career in 2015 in karting. In 2016, he switched to the Italian F4 Championship making his circuit racing debut, during the season he took six points finishes, on his way to finishing twenty-second in the standings. He switched to the TCR Middle East Series for 2017, starting the season at the second round with Top Run Motorsport, before switching to Liqui Moly Team Engstler for the last round. He finished the season fifth in the standings, taking two podiums.

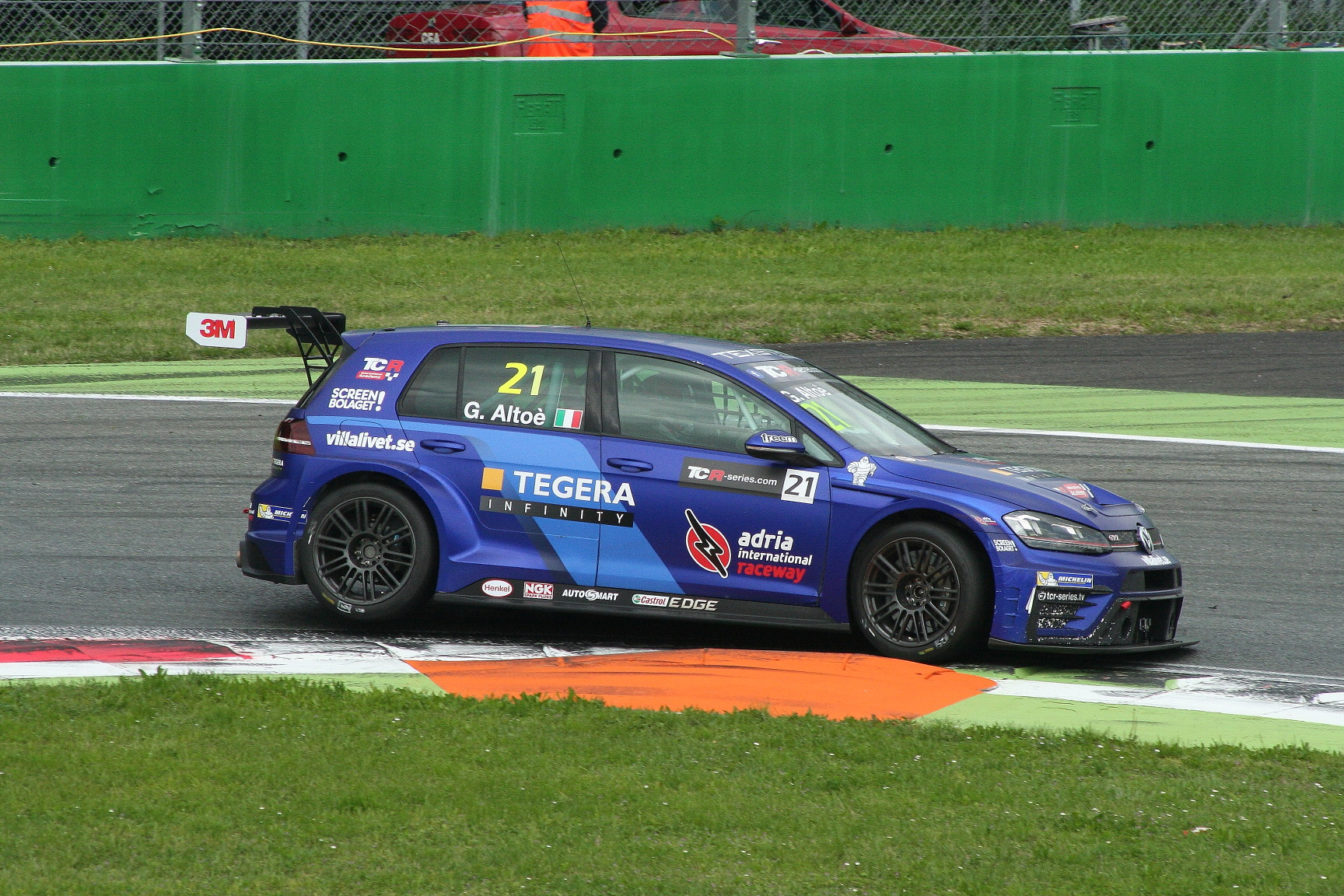
Altoè racing in the TCR International Series at Monza in 2017.

In March 2017, it was announced that Altoè would race in the TCR International Series, driving a Volkswagen Golf GTI TCR for WestCoast Racing. But he switched to M1RA for the round in Buriram - that was his final weekend of the year in the international field.

== Personal life ==
Altoè lives in San Marino and has raced under a Sammarinese licence.

== Racing record ==
=== Career summary ===
Season	Series	Team	Races	Wins	Poles	F/Laps	Podiums	Points	Position
2016	Italian F4 Championship	Bhaitech Engineering	21	0	0	0	0	21	22nd
2017	TCR Trophy Europe	Target Competition	2	0	0	1	2	45	**2nd**
2017	TCR Italy Touring Car Championship	V-Action Racing	2	0	0	0	0	45	8th
2017	TCR Italy Touring Car Championship	Target Competition	2	1	1	2	2	45	8th
2017	TCR BeNeLux Touring Car Championship	Delahaye Racing	11	2	0	2	5	188	9th
2017	TCR International Series	WestCoast Racing	14	0	0	0	0	63	13th
2017	TCR International Series	M1RA	2	0	0	0	1	63	13th
2017	TCR Middle East Series	Top Run Motorsport	1	0	0	0	1	46	5th
2017	TCR Middle East Series	Liqui Moly Team Engstler	2	0	0	0	1	46	5th
2018	Blancpain GT Series Endurance Cup	Antonelli Motorsport	1	0	0	0	0	0	NC
2018	Italian GT Championship	Antonelli Motorsport	14	3	2	2	8	159	**1st**
2018	Lamborghini Super Trofeo Europe - Pro	Antonelli Motorsport	12	4	1	4	7	?	**1st**
2018	Lamborghini Super Trofeo World Final - Pro	Antonelli Motorsport	2	1	1	1	1	18	**1st**
2018	Lamborghini Super Trofeo Middle East - Pro-Am		6	3	3	3	6	72	**3rd**
2018	TCR Middle East Series	Pit Lane Competizioni	5	1	0	1	4	92	**2nd**
2019	Blancpain GT Series Endurance Cup	Orange1 FFF Racing Team	2	0	0	0	0	12	19th
2019	International GT Open	Emil Frey Racing	14	4	4	2	6	128	**1st**
2019	IMSA SportsCar Championship - GTD	Ebimotors	1	0	0	0	0	14	64th
2019	24H GT Series - A6	Target Racing							
2020	GT World Challenge Europe Endurance Cup	Emil Frey Racing	4	0	0	0	0	8	19th
2020	GT World Challenge Europe Sprint Cup	Emil Frey Racing	10	2	1	1	2	60.5	5th
2020	Intercontinental GT Challenge	Emil Frey Racing	1	0	0	0	0	0	NC
2020	Italian GT Championship - Endurance	Imperiale Racing	1	0	0	0	0	6	17th
2020	Italian GT Championship - Sprint	LP Racing	2	0	0	0	1	18	16th
2021	GT World Challenge Europe Endurance Cup	Emil Frey Racing	5	0	0	0	0	16	17th
2021	GT World Challenge America - Pro	TR3 Racing	2	0	0	1	1	30	7th
2021	GT World Challenge America - Pro-Am	TR3 Racing	8	0	1	2	3	88	10th
2021	Intercontinental GT Challenge	Emil Frey Racing	1	0	0	0	0	0	NC
2021	Intercontinental GT Challenge	TR3 Racing	1	0	0	0	0	0	NC
2021	International GT Open	Vincenzo Sospiri Racing	2	0	0	0	0	0	NC†
2021	24 Hours of Nürburgring - SP9	Hankook FFF Racing Team	1	0	0	0	0	N/A	DNF
2022	GT World Challenge Europe Endurance Cup	Emil Frey Racing	5	0	0	0	0	0	NC
2022	Intercontinental GT Challenge	Emil Frey Racing	1	0	0	0	0	1	22nd
2022	GT World Challenge America - Pro	K-PAX Racing	2	0	0	0	2	30	8th
2022	GT World Challenge America - Pro-Am	TR3 Racing	4	0	1	2	0	40	11th
2022	IMSA SportsCar Championship - GTD	TR3 Racing	1	0	0	0	0	218	60th
2023	GT World Challenge Europe Sprint Cup	Emil Frey Racing	10	0	0	0	1	41	7th
2023-24	Middle East Trophy - GT3	racing one	1	0	0	0	0	0	NC
2024	GT World Challenge Europe Sprint Cup	Emil Frey Racing	10	0	0	0	2	43.5	4th
2024	Ferrari Challenge Europe - Trofeo Pirelli (Pro)	Emil Frey Racing	12	8	9	9	11	184	**1st**
2024	IMSA SportsCar Championship - GTD Pro	Conquest Racing	1	1	0	1	1	380	31st
2024	International GT Open	racing one	2	0	1	1	0	1	36th
2024	Gulf 12 Hours	racing one	1	0	0	0	0	N/A	16th
2024-25	Asian Le Mans Series - GT	Dragon Racing	4	0	0	0	0	0	NC†
2025	IMSA SportsCar Championship - GTD Pro	DragonSpeed	6	1	4	3	4	1999	12th
2025	IMSA SportsCar Championship - GTD	Conquest Racing	1	0	0	0	0	222	73rd
2025	International GT Open	Baron Motorsport Team	2	0	1	0	0	4	33rd
2025	Italian GT Championship Endurance Cup - GT3	AF Corse	1	0	0	0	0	3	NC†
2025	Gulf 12 Hours	DFYNE by Dragon Racing	1	0	0	0	0	N/A	16th
2025-26	24H Series Middle East - GT3	Dragon Racing							
2026	IMSA SportsCar Championship - GTD	DragonSpeed	9	0	1	0	0	1978	16th
2026	IMSA SportsCar Championship - GTD Pro	DragonSpeed	1	0	0	0	0	268	36th
2026	Le Mans Cup - GT3	Kessel Racing	4	0	0	0	1	59	8th
2026	Italian GT Championship Endurance Cup - GT3	Kessel Racing	4	0	0	0	0	6	21st
2026	Shanghai 8 Hours	AF Corse	1	0	0	0	0	N/A	6th
2026	GT World Challenge Europe Endurance Cup	JMW Motorsport	1	0	0	0	0	0	NC†
2026-27	Asian Le Mans Series - GT3	DFYNE Racing Team							

^{*} Season still in progress. ^{†} As Altoè was a guest driver, he was ineligible to score points.

=== Complete Italian F4 Championship results ===
(key) (Races in bold indicate pole position) (Races in italics indicate fastest lap)

Year	Team	1	2	3	4	5	6	7	8	9	10	11	12	13	14	15	16	17	18	19	20	21	22	23	DC	Points
2016	Bhaitech Engineering	MIS; 1	MIS; 2; 22	MIS; 3; 7	MIS; 4; 14	ADR; 1	ADR; 2; 8	ADR; 3; 10	ADR; 4; 17	IMO1; 1; 19	IMO1; 2; 19	IMO1; 3; 27	MUG; 1; 23	MUG; 2; 20	MUG; 3; 20	VAL; 1; 25	VAL; 2; 12	VAL; 3; 8	IMO2; 1; 17	IMO2; 2; 12	IMO2; 3; 11	MNZ; 1; 7	MNZ; 2; 14	MNZ; 3; 8	22nd	21

=== Complete TCR International Series results ===
(key) (Races in bold indicate pole position) (Races in italics indicate fastest lap)

Year	Team	Car	1	2	3	4	5	6	7	8	9	10	11	12	13	14	15	16	17	18	19	20	DC	Points
2017	WestCoast Racing	Volkswagen Golf GTI TCR	RIM; 1; 8	RIM; 2; 10	BHR; 1; 10	BHR; 2 Ret	SPA; 1; 14	SPA; 2; 10	MNZ; 1 Ret	MNZ; 2; 12	SAL; 1; 15	SAL; 2; 8	HUN; 1; 8	HUN; 2; 4	OSC; 1; 5	OSC; 2 Ret							13th	63
2017	M1RA	Honda Civic Type R TCR															CHA; 1; 6	CHA; 2; 2	SHA; 1	SHA; 2	DUB; 1	DUB; 2	13th	63

=== Complete GT World Challenge Europe results ===
==== GT World Challenge Europe Endurance Cup ====
(key) (Races in bold indicate pole position) (Races in italics indicate fastest lap)

Year	Team	Car	Class	1	2	3	4	5	6	7	Pos.	Points
2018	Antonelli Motorsport	Lamborghini Huracán GT3	Pro-Am	MNZ	SIL	LEC	SPA; 6H; 43	SPA; 12H; 42	SPA; 24H; 46	CAT	26th	4
2019	Orange 1 FFF Racing Team	Lamborghini Huracán GT3 Evo	Silver	MNZ	SIL	LEC	SPA; 6H; 61	SPA; 12H; 52	SPA; 24H; Ret		24th	1
2019	Orange 1 FFF Racing Team	Lamborghini Huracán GT3 Evo	Pro							CAT; 4	19th	12
2020	Emil Frey Racing	Lamborghini Huracán GT3 Evo	Pro	IMO; 18	NÜR; Ret	SPA; 6H; 6	SPA; 12H; 11	SPA; 24H; 31	LEC; 8		19th	8
2021	Emil Frey Racing	Lamborghini Huracán GT3 Evo	Pro	MNZ; 23	LEC; 36	SPA; 6H; 56†	SPA; 12H; Ret	SPA; 24H; Ret	NÜR; 4	CAT; 8	17th	16
2022	Emil Frey Racing	Lamborghini Huracán GT3 Evo	Pro	IMO; Ret	LEC; Ret	SPA; 6H; 22	SPA; 12H; 15	SPA; 24H; 14	HOC; 14	CAT; Ret	NC	0
2026	JMW Motorsport	Ferrari 296 GT3 Evo	Gold	LEC	MNZ	SPA; 6H	SPA; 12H	SPA; 24H	NÜR	ALG; 17	NC‡	0‡

==== GT World Challenge Europe Sprint Cup ====
Year	Team	Car	Class	1	2	3	4	5	6	7	8	9	10	Pos.	Points
2020	Emil Frey Racing	Lamborghini Huracán GT3 Evo	Pro	MIS; 1; 7	MIS; 2; 5	MIS; 3; 8	MAG; 1 Ret	MAG; 2; 12	ZAN; 1; 4	ZAN; 2; 1	CAT; 1; 1	**CAT**; **2**; 16	CAT; 3; 5	5th	60.5
2023	Emil Frey Racing	Ferrari 296 GT3	Pro	BRH; 1; 5	BRH; 2; 8	MIS; 1; 2	MIS; 2; 6	HOC; 1 Ret	HOC; 2; 12	VAL; 1; 7	VAL; 2; 5	ZAN; 1; 10	ZAN; 2; 5	7th	41
2024	Emil Frey Racing	Ferrari 296 GT3	Pro	BRH; 1; 11	BRH; 2; 2	MIS; 1; 3	MIS; 2; 4	HOC; 1; 8	HOC; 2; 22	MAG; 1; 4	MAG; 2; 10	CAT; 1; 10	CAT; 2; 6	4th	43.5

=== Complete IMSA SportsCar Championship results ===
(key) (Races in bold indicate pole position; results in italics indicate fastest lap)

Year	Team	Class	Make	Engine	1	2	3	4	5	6	7	8	9	10	11	12	Pos.	Points	Ref
2019	Ebimotors	GTD	Lamborghini Huracán GT3 Evo	Lamborghini 5.2 L V10	DAY; 17	SEB	MDO	DET	WGL	MOS	LIM	ELK	VIR	LGA	PET		64th	14	
2022	TR3 Racing	GTD	Lamborghini Huracán GT3 Evo	Lamborghini 5.2 L V10	DAY; 11	SEB	LBH	LGA	MDO	DET	WGL	MOS	LIM	ELK	VIR	PET	60th	218	
2024	Conquest Racing	GTD Pro	Ferrari 296 GT3	Ferrari F163CE 3.0 L Turbo V6	DAY	SEB	LGA	DET	WGL	MOS	ELK; 1	VIR	IMS	PET			31st	380	
2025	Conquest Racing	GTD	Ferrari 296 GT3	Ferrari F163CE 3.0 L Turbo V6	DAY; 11		LBH										73rd	212	
2025	DragonSpeed	GTD Pro	Ferrari 296 GT3	Ferrari F163CE 3.0 L Turbo V6		**SEB**; 4		**LGA**; 2	DET	WGL	MOS; 1	**ELK**; 3	**VIR**; 2	IMS	PET; 7		12th	1999	
2026	DragonSpeed	GTD	Chevrolet Corvette Z06 GT3.R	Chevrolet LT6.R 5.5 L V8	DAY; 16	SEB; 15	LBH; 11	LGA; 11		WGL; 16	MOS; 10	ELK; 4	**VIR**; 11	IMS; 4			16th	1978	
2026	DragonSpeed	GTD Pro	Chevrolet Corvette Z06 GT3.R	Chevrolet LT6.R 5.5 L V8					DET						PET; 6		36th	268	

=== Complete Le Mans Cup results ===
(key) (Races in bold indicate pole position) (Races in italics indicate the fastest lap)

Year	Entrant	Class	Chassis	1	2	3	4	5	6	Pos.	Points
2026	Kessel Racing	GT3	Ferrari 296 GT3 Evo	BAR; 6	LEC	LMS; 4	SPA	SIL; 2	POR; 5	8th	59

^{*} Season still in progress.

Sporting positions
Preceded by Mikkel Mac	International GT Open; Champion; 2019; With: Albert Costa	Succeeded by Henrique Chaves; Miguel Ramos
