= Simon Belcher =

British racing driver (born 1973)

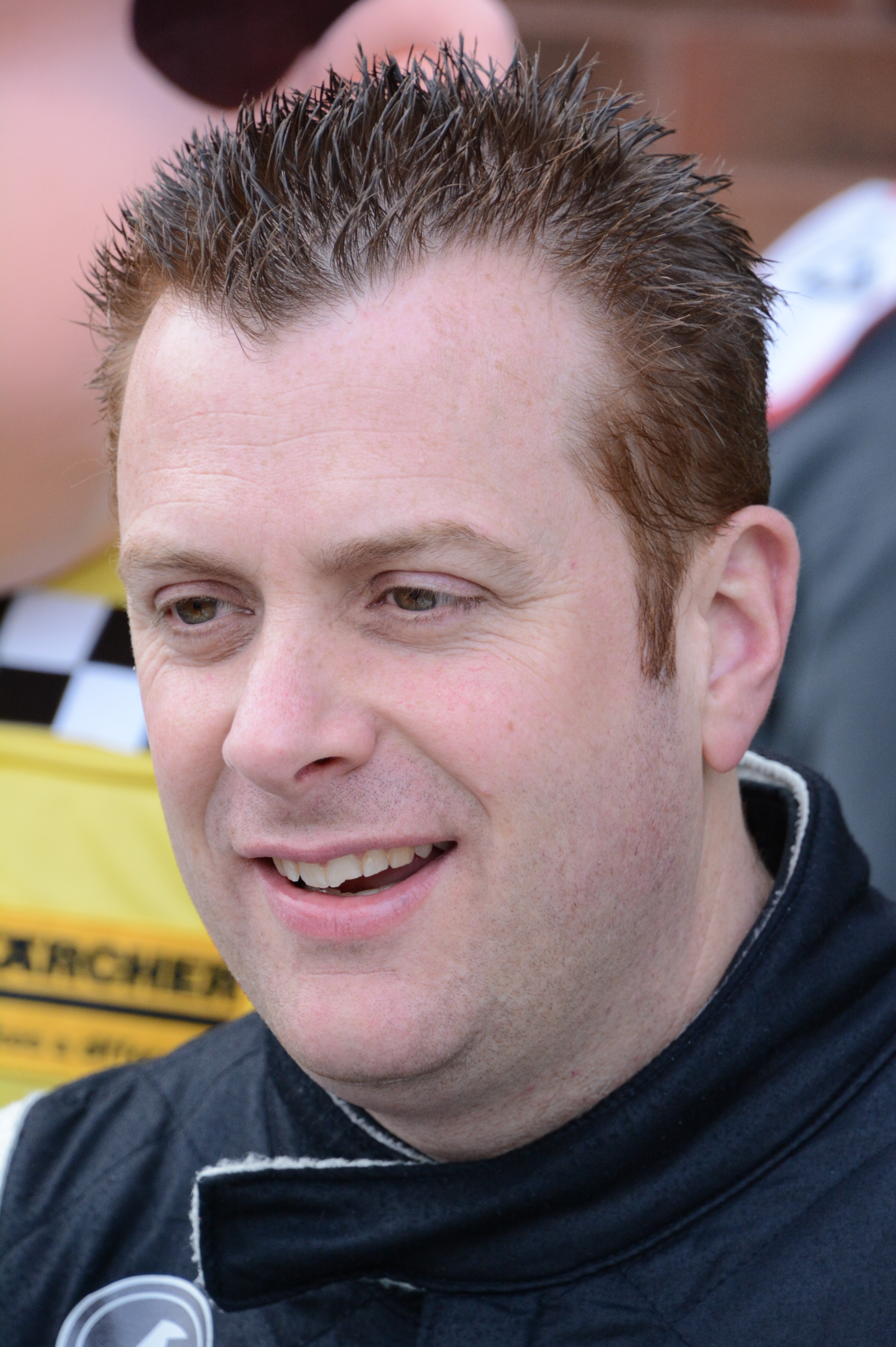
- Belcher at Brands Hatch during the 2015 British Touring Car Championship.
- Nationality: (United Kingdom) British
- Born: 18 December 1973 (age 52) Swindon, Wiltshire

British Touring Car Championship career
- Debut season: 2014
- Current team: Handy Motorsport
- Car number: 11
- Starts: 48
- Championships: 0
- Wins: 0
- Poles: 0
- Fastest laps: 0
- Best finish: 27th in 2015

Previous series
- 2011–2013 2001–2010: Renault Clio Cup UK; Legends Cars (various series)

Championship titles
- 2012, 2013: Renault Clio Cup UK Masters' Trophy

Simon Alister Belcher (born 18 December 1973) is a British racing driver, who last competed in the British Touring Car Championship for Handy Motorsport. He is also a multiple time British, European and World Jet Ski Champion who competes in the World Series.

== Career ==
Born in Swindon, Belcher began racing jet-skis at the age of nineteen, winning four British championships and a European championship before his retirement in 2001 he then switched to car racing, competing in Legends Cars over the next decade. In 2011, he entered the Renault Clio Cup UK for the final race of the season with his own Handy Motorsport team ahead of full campaigns in 2012 and 2013. He finished 13th and 18th in the overall championships in these years, and won the Masters' Championship for older drivers on both occasions.

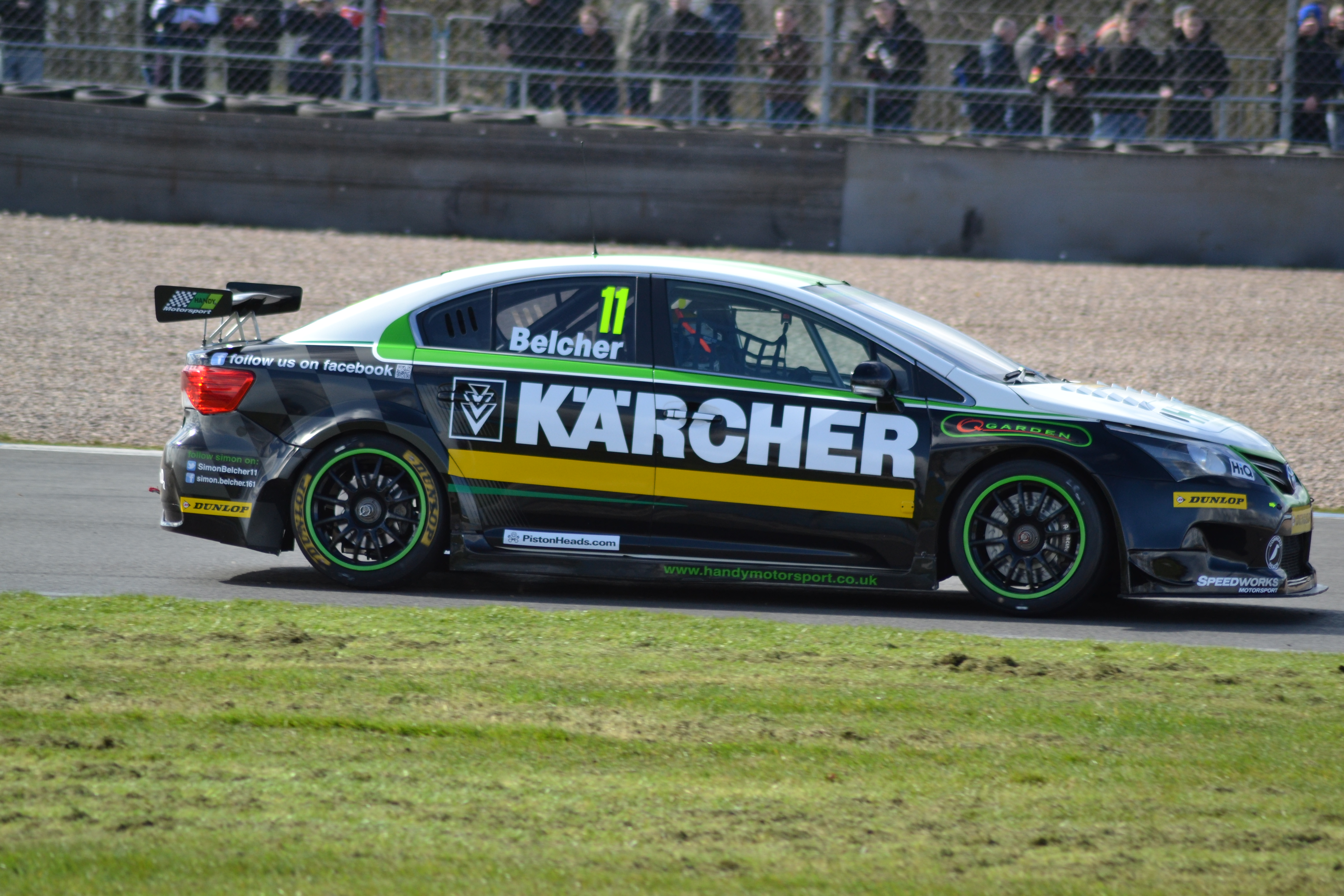
Belcher driving the Handy Motorsport Toyota Avensis at Donington Park during the 2014 British Touring Car Championship season.

In 2014, Belcher moved up to the British Touring Car Championship, driving a Toyota Avensis run by the Speedworks team on behalf of Handy Motorsport. He crashed heavily at Thruxton due to a mechanical failure, heavily damaging the car and putting the rest of his season in jeopardy, but it was repaired in time for the next round of the championship.

After retirement from the British Touring Car Championship, Belcher returned to his roots of Jet Ski racing and in 2018 secured his first international title since his return by winning the European Championship. In 2023, he became World Champion in both Sport GP and slalom categories.

== Racing record ==
=== Complete British Touring Car Championship results ===
(key) (Races in bold indicate pole position – 1 point awarded just in first race; races in italics indicate fastest lap – 1 point awarded all races; * signifies that driver lead race for at least one lap – 1 point given all races)

| Year | Team | Car | 1 | 2 | 3 | 4 | 5 | 6 | 7 | 8 | 9 | 10 | 11 | 12 | 13 | 14 | 15 | 16 | 17 | 18 | 19 | 20 | 21 | 22 | 23 | 24 | 25 | 26 | 27 | 28 | 29 | 30 | Pos | Pts |
|---|---|---|---|---|---|---|---|---|---|---|---|---|---|---|---|---|---|---|---|---|---|---|---|---|---|---|---|---|---|---|---|---|---|---|
| 2014 | Handy Motorsport | Toyota Avensis | BRH; 1; 21 | BRH; 2; 23 | BRH; 3; 21 | DON; 1; 23 | DON; 2; 20 | DON; 3; 18 | THR; 1 Ret | THR; 2; 23 | THR; 3 Ret | OUL; 1; 26 | OUL; 2; 23 | OUL; 3; 21 | CRO; 1; 26 | CRO; 2; 22 | CRO; 3; 18 | SNE; 1; 25 | SNE; 2; 21 | SNE; 3; 23 | KNO; 1; 21 | KNO; 2; 24 | KNO; 3; 23 | ROC; 1; 28 | ROC; 2; 20 | ROC; 3; 18 | SIL; 1; 25 | SIL; 2; 24 | SIL; 3; 22 | BRH; 1; 20 | BRH; 2; 21 | BRH; 3; 18 | 31st | 0 |
| 2015 | Handy Motorsport | Toyota Avensis | BRH; 1; 20 | BRH; 2; 19 | BRH; 3; 15 | DON; 1 Ret | DON; 2; 21 | DON; 3; 16 | THR; 1 DNS | THR; 2 DNS | THR; 3 DNS | OUL; 1; 23 | OUL; 2; 21 | OUL; 3; 21 | CRO; 1; 20 | CRO; 2; 21 | CRO; 3; 18 | SNE; 1 | SNE; 2 | SNE; 3 | KNO; 1 | KNO; 2 | KNO; 3 | ROC; 1 | ROC; 2 | ROC; 3 | SIL; 1; 26 | SIL; 2; 22 | SIL; 3; 19 | BRH; 1; 23 | BRH; 2; 23 | BRH; 3; 24 | 27th | 1 |
