= 2017 TCR Middle East Series =

The 2017 TCR Middle East Series season was the first season of the TCR Middle East Series. The championship started at Dubai Autodrome in Dubai on 12 January and ended at Bahrain International Circuit in Bahrain on 10 March.

== Teams and drivers ==
Team	Car	No.	Drivers	Rounds
(Germany) Liqui Moly Team Engstler	Volkswagen Golf GTI TCR	7	(Germany) Stefan Goede	1–2
(Germany) Liqui Moly Team Engstler	Volkswagen Golf GTI TCR	8	(Germany) Luca Engstler	All
(Germany) Liqui Moly Team Engstler	Volkswagen Golf GTI TCR	9	(Slovakia) Maťo Homola	1
(Germany) Liqui Moly Team Engstler	Volkswagen Golf GTI TCR	10	(Italy) Giacomo Altoè	3
(Germany) Liqui Moly Team Engstler	Volkswagen Golf GTI TCR	11	(Slovakia) Filip Sládecka	1
(Germany) Liqui Moly Team Engstler	Volkswagen Golf GTI TCR	46	(United States) Brandon Gdovic	All
(Italy) Top Run Motorsport	Subaru WRX STi TCR	10	(Italy) Giacomo Altoè	2
(Italy) Top Run Motorsport	Subaru WRX STi TCR	12	(Italy) Luigi Ferrara	1
(Italy) Mulsanne Racing	Alfa Romeo Giulietta TCR	16	(Georgia (country)) Davit Kajaia	2–3
(Italy) Mulsanne Racing	Alfa Romeo Giulietta TCR	88	(Italy) Michela Cerruti	1
(United Arab Emirates) Lap57 Motorsports	Honda Civic TCR	57	(United Arab Emirates) Mohammed Al Owais	2
(United Arab Emirates) Lap57 Motorsports	Honda Civic TCR	75	(United Kingdom) Josh Files	2–3
(United Kingdom) CadSpeed Racing	Audi RS 3 LMS TCR	108	(United Kingdom) James Kaye	1
(Netherlands) Red Camel-Jordans.nl	Seat León TCR	303	(United Kingdom) Kane Astin	1

== Calendar and results ==
The 2017 schedule was announced on 15 November 2016, with three events held across the Middle East.

Rnd.		Circuit	Date	Pole position	Fastest lap	Winning driver	Winning team	Supporting
1	1	(United Arab Emirates) Dubai Autodrome, Dubai (GP Circuit)	13 January	(Germany) Luca Engstler	(Slovakia) Maťo Homola	(Germany) Luca Engstler	(Germany) Liqui Moly Team Engstler	Dubai 24 Hour
1	2	(United Arab Emirates) Dubai Autodrome, Dubai (GP Circuit)	13 January		(Slovakia) Maťo Homola	(United States) Brandon Gdovic	(Germany) Liqui Moly Team Engstler	Dubai 24 Hour
2	3	(United Arab Emirates) Yas Marina Circuit, Abu Dhabi (GP Circuit)	10 February	(United Kingdom) Josh Files	(United Kingdom) Josh Files	(United Kingdom) Josh Files	(United Arab Emirates) Lap57 Motorsports	Yas Racing Series; TRD 86 Cup; Porsche GT3 Cup Middle East
2	4	(United Arab Emirates) Yas Marina Circuit, Abu Dhabi (GP Circuit)	11 February		(United Kingdom) Josh Files	(United Kingdom) Josh Files	(United Arab Emirates) Lap57 Motorsports	Yas Racing Series; TRD 86 Cup; Porsche GT3 Cup Middle East
3	5	Bahrain International Circuit, Sakhir (Oasis Circuit)	11 March	(United Kingdom) Josh Files	(United Kingdom) Josh Files	(United Kingdom) Josh Files	(United Arab Emirates) Lap57 Motorsports	
3	6	Bahrain International Circuit, Sakhir (Oasis Circuit)	11 March		(Georgia (country)) Davit Kajaia	(United Kingdom) Josh Files	(United Arab Emirates) Lap57 Motorsports	

== Championship standings ==
=== Drivers' championship ===
Pos.	Driver	DUB (United Arab Emirates)		YMC (United Arab Emirates)		BHR (Bahrain)		Points
1	(United Kingdom) Josh Files			1^{1}	1	1^{1}	1	110
2	(United States) Brandon Gdovic	3^{3}	1	4	4	2^{4}	2	105
3	(Germany) Luca Engstler	1^{1}	6	6†	3	3^{3}	Ret	79
4	(Georgia (country)) Davit Kajaia			2^{2}	2	DNS^{2}	4†	56
5	(Italy) Giacomo Altoè			3^{3}	DNS	4^{5}	3	46
6	(Germany) Stefan Goede	5	4	7†	5			38
7	(Slovakia) Maťo Homola	6^{2}	2					30
8	(United Kingdom) James Kaye	4	5					22
9	(Italy) Michela Cerruti	2^{5}	Ret					19
10	(Slovakia) Filip Sládecka	8	3					19
11	(United Arab Emirates) Mohammed Al Owais			5^{5}	Ret			11
12	(United Kingdom) Kane Astin	7	Ret					6
13	(Italy) Luigi Ferrara	Ret^{4}	DNS					2

=== Teams' Championship ===
Pos.	Driver	DUB (United Arab Emirates)		YMC (United Arab Emirates)		BHR (Bahrain)		Points
1	(Germany) Liqui Moly Team Engstler	1^{1}	2	4^{4}	3	2^{3}	2	210
1	(Germany) Liqui Moly Team Engstler	3^{2}	1	6†	4	3^{4}	3	210
2	(United Arab Emirates) Lap57 Motorsports			1^{1}	1	1^{1}	1	121
2	(United Arab Emirates) Lap57 Motorsports			5^{5}	Ret			121
3	(Italy) Mulsanne Racing	2^{5}	Ret	2^{2}	2	DNS^{2}	4†	60
4	(United Kingdom) CadSpeed Racing	4^{6}	5					28
5	(Italy) Top Run Motorsport	Ret^{4}	DNS	3^{3}	DNS			21
6	(Netherlands) Red Camel-Jordans.nl	5	Ret					10
