= TCR Middle East Touring Car Series =

Touring car racing series based in the Middle East

- Category: Touring cars
- Country: Middle East
- Inaugural season: 2017
- Drivers' champion: René Münnich
- Teams' champion: Münnich Motorsport

The TCR Middle East Touring Car Series is a touring car racing series based in the Middle East.

== History ==
On 15 November 2016, WSC announced that the creation of the TCR Middle East Series. The series was officially launched on 2 December 2016 at the Bahrain International Circuit, where a media and test day were held. The series visits the Dubai Autodrome, Yas Marina Circuit and the Bahrain International Circuit.

== Relaunch ==
In August 2022, the TCR Middle East Series was relaunched by WSC in cooperation with its new promoter, Driving Force Events. A 2022-2023 schedule was published and included two pairs of back-to-back events at Yas Marina Circuit, the Bahrain International Circuit and the Dubai Autodrome, plus another event at a yet-to-be-confirmed venue. Unlike previous iterations of the TCR Middle East Series, the relaunched championship will feature hour-long races with mandatory driver changes as well as some night races.

== 2017 Results ==
Rnd.		Circuit	Date	Pole position	Fastest lap	Winning driver	Winning team
1	1	(United Arab Emirates) Dubai Autodrome, Dubai (GP Circuit)	13 January	(Germany) Luca Engstler	(Slovakia) Maťo Homola	(Germany) Luca Engstler	(Germany) Liqui Moly Team Engstler
1	2	(United Arab Emirates) Dubai Autodrome, Dubai (GP Circuit)	13 January		(Slovakia) Maťo Homola	(United States) Brandon Gdovic	(Germany) Liqui Moly Team Engstler
2	3	(United Arab Emirates) Yas Marina Circuit, Abu Dhabi (GP Circuit)	10 February	(United Kingdom) Josh Files	(United Kingdom) Josh Files	(United Kingdom) Josh Files	(United Arab Emirates) Lap57 Motorsports
2	4	(United Arab Emirates) Yas Marina Circuit, Abu Dhabi (GP Circuit)	11 February		(United Kingdom) Josh Files	(United Kingdom) Josh Files	(United Arab Emirates) Lap57 Motorsports
3	5	Bahrain International Circuit, Sakhir (Oasis Circuit)	11 March	(United Kingdom) Josh Files	(United Kingdom) Josh Files	(United Kingdom) Josh Files	(United Arab Emirates) Lap57 Motorsports
3	6	Bahrain International Circuit, Sakhir (Oasis Circuit)	11 March		(Georgia (country)) Davit Kajaia	(United Kingdom) Josh Files	(United Arab Emirates) Lap57 Motorsports

== 2018 Results ==
Rnd.		Circuit	Date	Pole position	Fastest lap	Winning driver	Winning team
1	1	(United Arab Emirates) Yas Marina Circuit, Abu Dhabi (North Circuit)	20 January	(Italy) Giacomo Altoè	(Slovakia) Maťo Homola	(Italy) Giacomo Altoè	(Italy) Pit Lane Competizioni
1	2	(United Arab Emirates) Yas Marina Circuit, Abu Dhabi (North Circuit)	20 January		(Germany) Luca Engstler	(Germany) Luca Engstler	(Germany) Liqui Moly Team Engstler
2	3	(United Arab Emirates) Dubai Autodrome, Dubai (International Circuit)	27 January	(Germany) Luca Engstler	(Germany) Luca Engstler	(Germany) Luca Engstler	(Germany) Liqui Moly Team Engstler
2	4	(United Arab Emirates) Dubai Autodrome, Dubai (International Circuit)	27 January		(Switzerland) Florian Thoma	(Switzerland) Florian Thoma	(Germany) Liqui Moly Team Engstler
3	5	Bahrain International Circuit, Sakhir (Oasis Circuit)	23-24 February	(Germany) Luca Engstler	(Germany) Luca Engstler	(Germany) Luca Engstler	(Germany) Liqui Moly Team Engstler
3	6	Bahrain International Circuit, Sakhir (Oasis Circuit)	23-24 February	Race cancelled due to heavy rain.			

== 2019 Results ==
Rnd.		Circuit	Date	Pole position	Fastest lap	Winning driver	Winning team
1	1	(United Arab Emirates) Dubai Autodrome, Dubai (International Circuit)	25 January	(Germany) René Münnich	(Germany) René Münnich	(Germany) René Münnich	(Germany) ALL-INKL.COM Münnich Motorsport
1	2	(United Arab Emirates) Dubai Autodrome, Dubai (International Circuit)	25 January		(Germany) René Münnich	(Germany) René Münnich	(Germany) ALL-INKL.COM Münnich Motorsport
1	3	(United Arab Emirates) Dubai Autodrome, Dubai (International Circuit)	26 January	(Netherlands) Luc Breukers (Germany) René Münnich	(Netherlands) Luc Breukers (Germany) René Münnich	(Hungary) Csaba Tóth (Hungary) Zoltán Zengő	(Hungary) Zengő Motorsport
2	4	(United Arab Emirates) Yas Marina Circuit, Abu Dhabi (GP Circuit)	1 February	(Germany) René Münnich	(Germany) René Münnich	(Germany) René Münnich	(Germany) ALL-INKL.COM Münnich Motorsport
2	5	(United Arab Emirates) Yas Marina Circuit, Abu Dhabi (GP Circuit)	2 February		(Germany) René Münnich	(Germany) René Münnich	(Germany) ALL-INKL.COM Münnich Motorsport
2	6	(United Arab Emirates) Yas Marina Circuit, Abu Dhabi (GP Circuit)	2 February	(Netherlands) Luc Breukers (Germany) René Münnich	(Netherlands) Luc Breukers (Germany) René Münnich	(Netherlands) Ivo Breukers (Netherlands) Luc Breukers	(Netherlands) Red Camel-Jordans.nl
3	7	(United Arab Emirates) Dubai Autodrome, Dubai (GP Circuit)	7 February	(Germany) René Münnich	(Germany) René Münnich	(Germany) René Münnich	(Germany) ALL-INKL.COM Münnich Motorsport
3	8	(United Arab Emirates) Dubai Autodrome, Dubai (GP Circuit)	7 February		(Germany) René Münnich	(Germany) René Münnich	(Germany) ALL-INKL.COM Münnich Motorsport
3	9	(United Arab Emirates) Dubai Autodrome, Dubai (GP Circuit)	7 February	(Netherlands) Luc Breukers (Germany) René Münnich	(Netherlands) Luc Breukers (Germany) René Münnich	(Netherlands) Ivo Breukers (Netherlands) Luc Breukers (Lebanon) Yusif Bassil	(Netherlands) Red Camel-Jordans.nl
