= Massimiliano Pedalà =

Italian racing driver

Massimiliano Pedalà (born 22 December 1969 in Cantù, Como) is an Italian auto racing driver.

== Career ==
Pedala's SEAT León at Brands Hatch in the 2007 WTCC

Pedalà's early racing career included the Italian Renault Mégane SportCup and the European Renault Clio RS Cup. In 2002, he competed in the Italian Alfa 147 Cup, finishing the season fourth on points. From 2004, he has raced in the Italian Renault Clio Cup, winning three successive titles in 2005, 2006 and 2007. He also competed in some rounds of the Italian Superturismo Championship with a SEAT Toledo.

Pedalà's success in the Clios led to a drive in the 2007 FIA World Touring Car Championship, for the independent SEAT Sport Italia Team in a SEAT León. He made just eight starts in the year, with a best placed finish of tenth in round nine at Brno. In 2008, he drove in the SEAT León Eurocup for Rangoni Motorsport, ending the season in fourth place.

=== Complete WTCC results ===
(key) (Races in bold indicate pole position) (Races in italics indicate fastest lap)

Year	Team	Car	1	2	3		4	5		6	7	8		9		10	11	Position	Points
2007	SEAT Sport Italia	SEAT León	CUR	ZAN	VAL		PAU	BRN		POR	AND	OSC		BRA		MNZ	MAC	NC	0
2007	SEAT Sport Italia	SEAT León			11	15		10	12			Ret	11	Ret	18			NC	0
