= Paul Rivett =

British racing driver (born 1978)

- Nationality: (United Kingdom) British
- Born: 27 August 1978 (age 48) Kent, England

British Touring Car Championship career
- Debut season: 2020
- Current team: Racing with Wera & Photon Group
- Car number: 20
- Former teams: AmD Essex
- Starts: 12
- Wins: 0
- Poles: 0
- Fastest laps: 0

Previous series
- 2019 2001-2018 2005: British Truck Racing Championship; Renault Clio Cup UK; Porsche Carrera Cup GB

Championship titles
- 2002, 2004, 2011, 2018: Renault Clio Cup UK

Paul Rivett (born 27 August 1978) is a British racing driver who competed in the British Touring Car Championship for GKR TradePriceCars.com. He is best known for winning the Renault Clio Cup UK title four times in 2002, 2004, 2011 and 2018 where he has spent most of his career.

== Complete British Touring Car Championship results ==
(key) (Races in bold indicate pole position – 1 point awarded just in first race; races in italics indicate fastest lap – 1 point awarded all races; * signifies that driver led race for at least one lap – 1 point given all races)

Year	Team	Car	1	2	3	4	5	6	7	8	9	10	11	12	13	14	15	16	17	18	19	20	21	22	23	24	25	26	27	28	29	30	DC	Points
2020	GKR TradePriceCars.com	Audi S3 Saloon	DON; 1	DON; 2	DON; 3	BRH; 1	BRH; 2	BRH; 3	OUL; 1	OUL; 2	OUL; 3	KNO; 1	KNO; 2	KNO; 3	THR; 1	THR; 2	THR; 3	SIL; 1	SIL; 2	SIL; 3	CRO; 1	CRO; 2	CRO; 3	SNE; 1; 19	SNE; 2; 23	SNE; 3; 21	BRH; 1; 15	BRH; 2; 23	BRH; 3; 17				28th	1
2021	Racing with Wera & Photon Group	Ford Focus ST	THR; 1	THR; 2	THR; 3	SNE; 1	SNE; 2	SNE; 3	BRH; 1	BRH; 2	BRH; 3	OUL; 1	OUL; 2	OUL; 3	KNO; 1; 23	KNO; 2; 19	KNO; 3; 21	THR; 1; 29	THR; 2; 23	THR; 3 Ret	CRO; 1	CRO; 2	CRO; 3	SIL; 1	SIL; 2	SIL; 3	DON; 1	DON; 2	DON; 3	BRH; 1	BRH; 2	BRH; 3	31st	0
