= Oscar Nogués =

Spanish racing driver

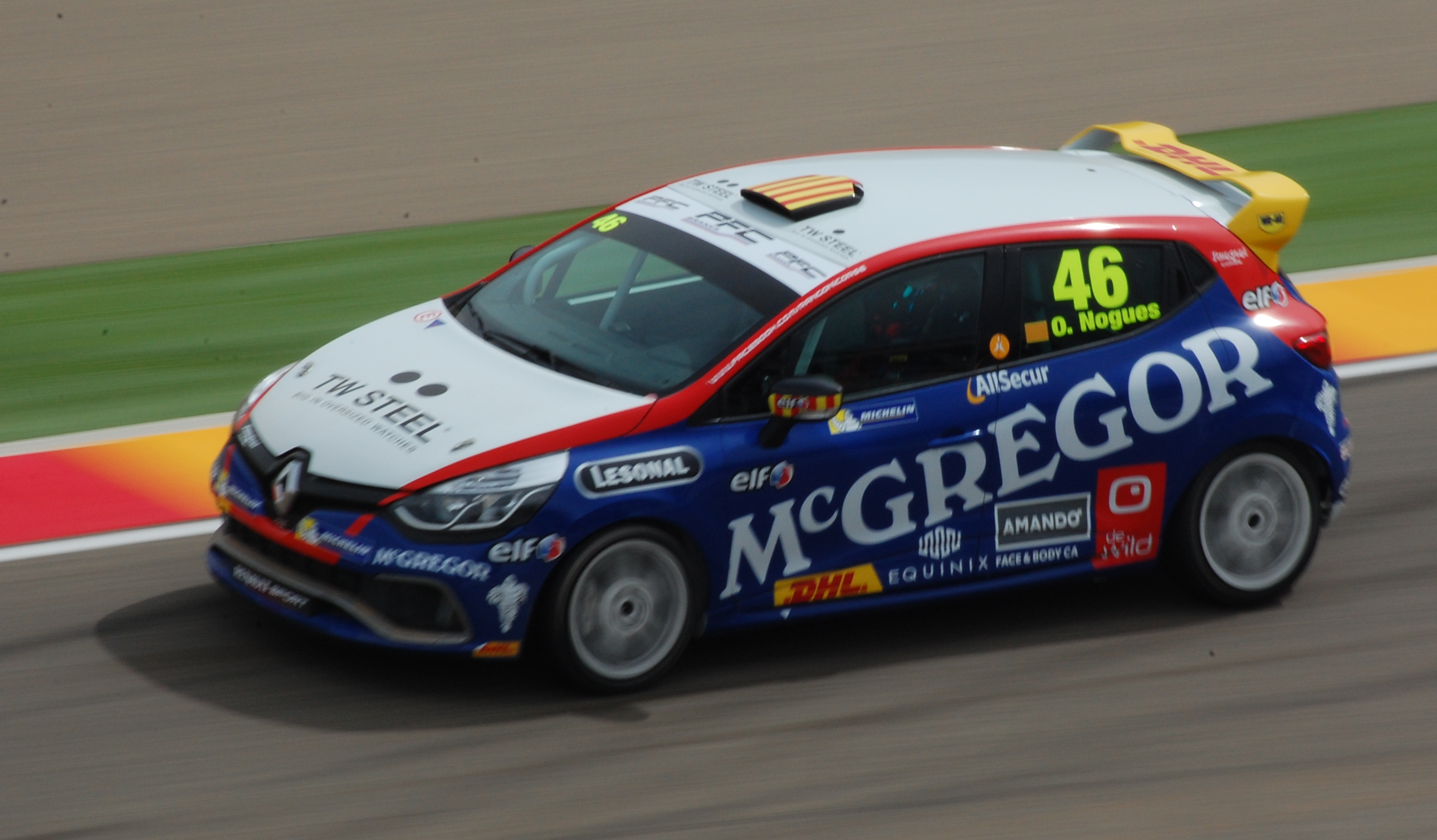
- Oscar Nogués in Motorland 2014
- Nationality: Spanish
- Full name: Oscar Nogués Farré
- Born: 21 May 1978 (age 48) Banyeres del Penedès (Spain)

Previous series
- 2012 2011 2011 2011–12 2008, 2010 2008 2007 2006–08 2005–2010 2001–03: Renault Clio Eurocup; Eurocup Renault Mégane V6 Trophy; Italian Renault Clio Cup; Spanish Renault Clio Cup; SEAT León Eurocup; ETCC; Spanish GT Championship; WTCC; Spanish SEAT León Supercopa; Spanish Renault Clio Cup

Championship titles
- 2012 2011 2008 2005–06 2003 2001: Renault Clio Eurocup; Italian Renault Clio Cup; SEAT León Eurocup; Spanish SEAT León Supercopa; Spanish Renault Clio Cup; 24 Hours of Barcelona

Óscar Nogués Farré (born 21 May 1978 in Banyeres del Penedès) is a Spanish auto racing driver. He won the Spanish SEAT León Supercopa in 2005 and 2006, and won the inaugural SEAT León Eurocup in 2008. He made one-off appearances in the World Touring Car Championship in 2006, 2007 and 2008 as rewards for his efforts in SEAT one-make series. He came second in the European Touring Car Cup to Michel Nykjaer in 2008. He also won at 2009 Les 24 hores de Barcelona with team Sunred Seven.

== Racing record ==
=== Complete World Touring Car Championship results ===
(key) (Races in bold indicate pole position) (Races in italics indicate fastest lap)

Year	Team	Car	1	2	3	4	5	6	7	8	9	10	11	12	13	14	15	16	17	18	19	20	21	22	23	24	DC	Points
2006	SEAT Sport	SEAT León	ITA; 1	ITA; 2	FRA; 1	FRA; 2	GBR; 1	GBR; 2	GER; 1	GER; 2	BRA; 1	BRA; 2	MEX; 1	MEX; 2	CZE; 1	CZE; 2	TUR; 1	TUR; 2	ESP; 1; 19	ESP; 2; 22	MAC; 1	MAC; 2					NC	0
2007	SEAT Sport	SEAT León	BRA; 1	BRA; 2	NED; 1	NED; 2	ESP; 1	ESP; 2	FRA; 1	FRA; 2	CZE; 1	CZE; 2	POR; 1	POR; 2	SWE; 1	SWE; 2	GER; 1	GER; 2	GBR; 1	GBR; 2	ITA; 1; 12	ITA; 2 DNS	MAC; 1	MAC; 2			NC	0
2008	SUNRED Engineering	SEAT León TFSI	BRA; 1	BRA; 2	MEX; 1	MEX; 2	ESP; 1	ESP; 2	FRA; 1 Ret	FRA; 2; 16	CZE; 1	CZE; 2	POR; 1	POR; 2	GBR; 1	GBR; 2	GER; 1	GER; 2	EUR; 1	EUR; 2	ITA; 1	ITA; 2	JPN; 1	JPN; 2	MAC; 1	MAC; 2	33rd	0

=== Complete TCR International Series results ===
(key) (Races in bold indicate pole position) (Races in italics indicate fastest lap)

Year	Team	Car	1	2	3	4	5	6	7	8	9	10	11	12	13	14	15	16	17	18	19	20	21	22	DC	Points
2015	Campos Racing	Opel Astra OPC	MYS; 1	MYS; 2	CHN; 1	CHN; 2	ESP; 1; 13	ESP; 2 Ret	POR; 1; 9	POR; 2; 7	ITA; 1	ITA; 2	AUT; 1	AUT; 2	RUS; 1	RUS; 2	RBR; 1	RBR; 2	SIN; 1	SIN; 2	THA; 1	THA; 2	MAC; 1	MAC; 2	28th	8

Sporting positions
Preceded by None	SEAT León Eurocup champion 2008	Succeeded by Norbert Michelisz
