= 2011 British Touring Car Championship =

54th season of the British Touring Car Championship

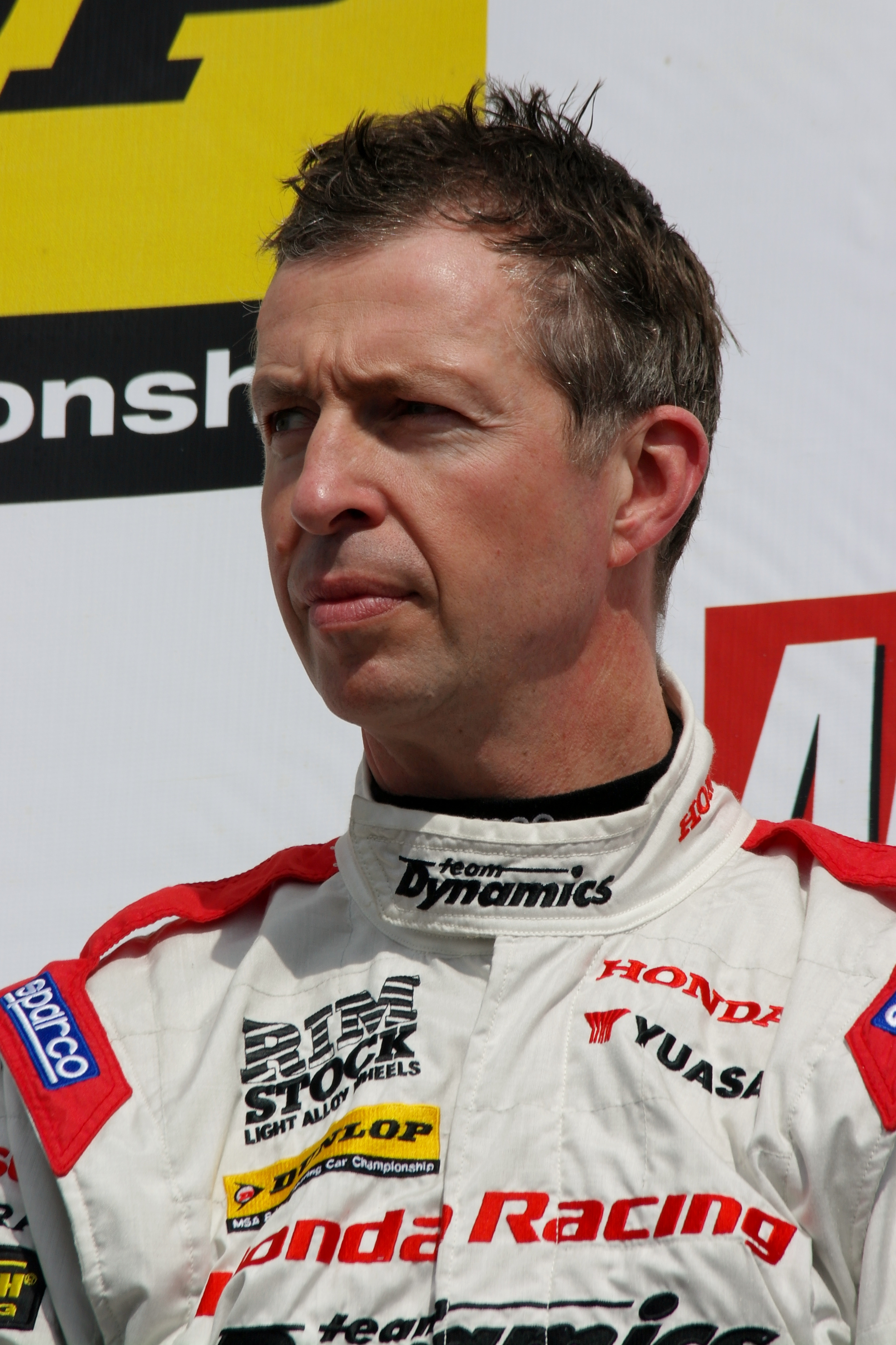
Matt Neal (pictured in 2012), the 2011 Drivers' Champion

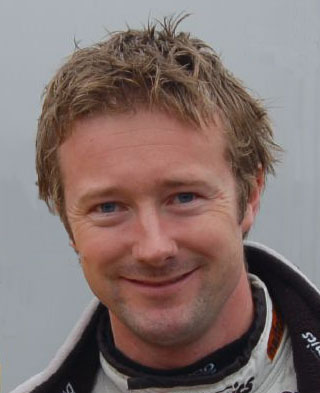
Neal's teammate, Gordon Shedden (pictured in 2007), finished the season in second

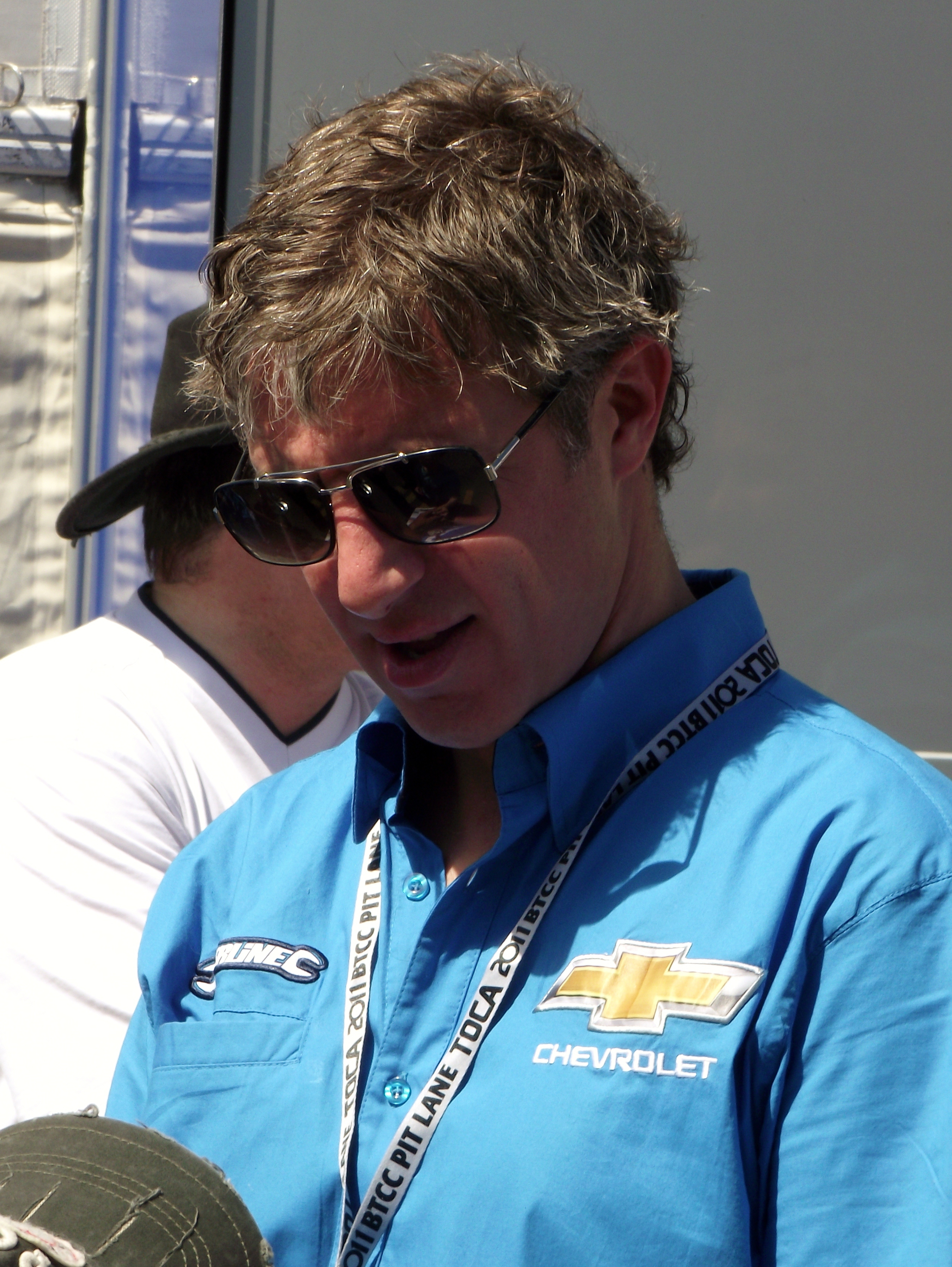
Jason Plato, finished third, 13 points behind Gordon Shedden

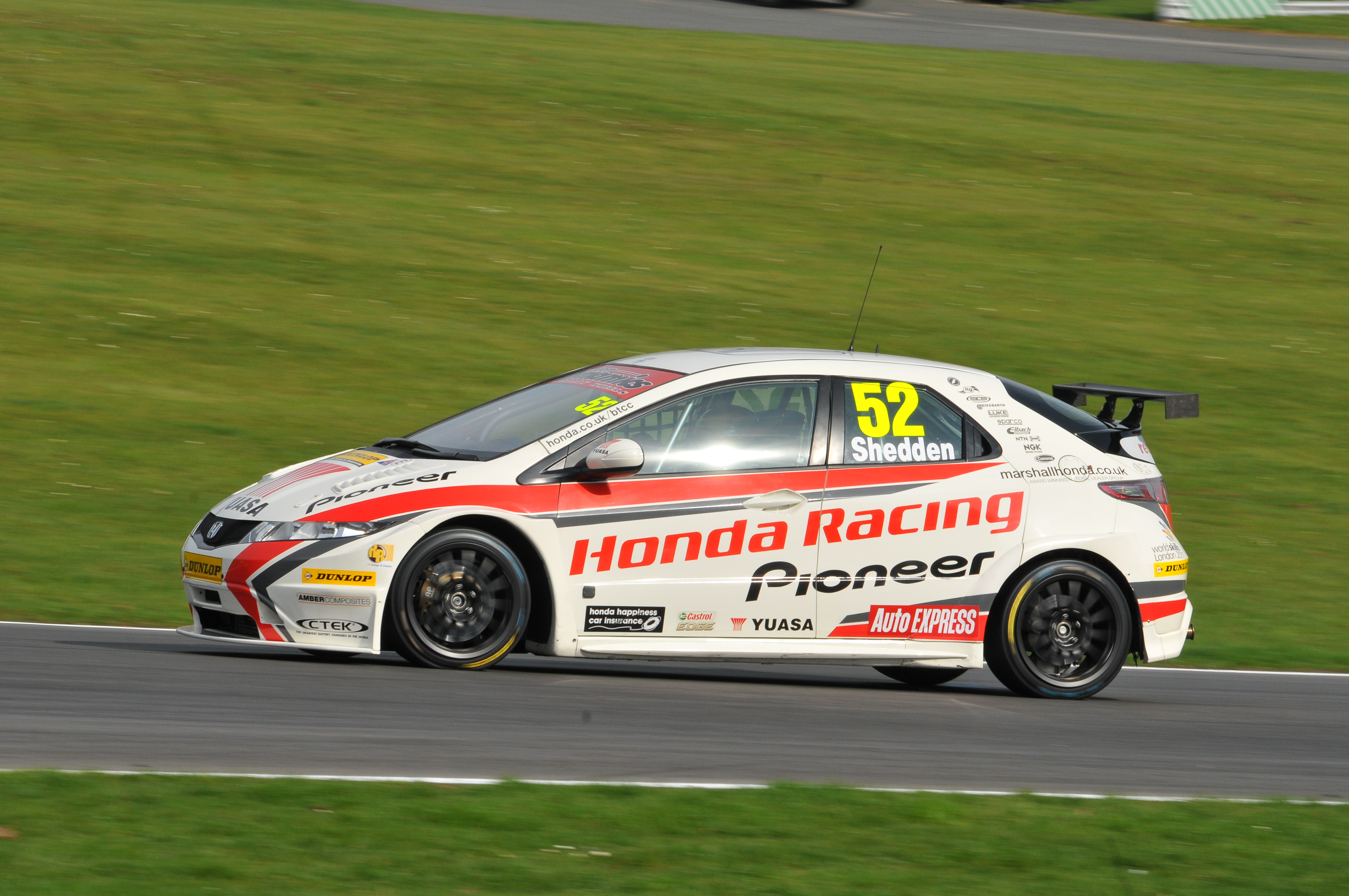
Gordon Shedden's Honda Civic.

The 2011 Dunlop MSA British Touring Car Championship was the 54th British Touring Car Championship (BTCC) season.

Cars conforming to the Next Generation Touring Car (NGTC) specification were allowed to compete in the championship for the first time, in a phased transition from Super 2000 specification to the NGTC specification. The season was also the final time that cars built to the BTC Touring specification were allowed to compete, ending the specification's decade of competition in the BTCC.

Team Dynamics' Matt Neal claimed his third BTCC title after finishing 8th in the final round of the season, two places ahead of teammate and rival Gordon Shedden, who was beaten to the title by eight points. Reigning Champion Jason Plato finished third after suffering a puncture in the first race of the final meeting at Silverstone. With the Hondas claiming a 1–2, this all but eliminated Plato from the title fight.

Joint fourth in the outright championship were Independents' title protagonists Mat Jackson and James Nash, with Jackson finishing fourth on merit of race wins, four to Nash's one. Nash, however, claimed the Independents' title in the first race at Silverstone after Jackson also suffered a puncture. Both however had torrid races after, failing to score points in both races. Nash's team, Triple 8 Race Engineering also claimed the Independents Teams' championship.

With Neal and Shedden first and second in the Drivers' championship, Honda easily clinched both the Teams' and Manufacturers' championships.

== Teams and drivers ==
The entry list for the 2011 season was revealed at the championship's Media Day held at Silverstone on 24 March 2011.

Team	Car	Engine	No.	Drivers	Rounds
Constructor S2000 Entries
Silverline Chevrolet	Chevrolet Cruze LT	Chevrolet/RML	1	(United Kingdom) Jason Plato	All
Silverline Chevrolet	Chevrolet Cruze LT	Chevrolet/RML	20	(United Kingdom) Alex MacDowall	All
Constructor S2000 Entries (NGTC Engine)
Honda Racing Team	Honda Civic	Honda/Neil Brown	2	(United Kingdom) Matt Neal	All
Honda Racing Team	Honda Civic	Honda/Neil Brown	52	(United Kingdom) Gordon Shedden	All
Independent Constructor S2000 Entries (NGTC Engine)
Team Aon	Ford Focus Mk.III	Ford/Mountune	4	(United Kingdom) Tom Onslow-Cole	5–10
Team Aon	Ford Focus Mk.III	Ford/Mountune	5	(United Kingdom) Tom Chilton	All
Team Aon	Ford Focus Mk.III	Ford/Mountune	44	(United Kingdom) Andy Neate	All
Independent NGTC Entries
Dynojet	Toyota Avensis	Toyota/XCtechR	11	(United Kingdom) Frank Wrathall	All
Rob Austin Racing	Audi A4	Audi/Ric Wood	12	(United Kingdom) David Pinkney	1
Rob Austin Racing	Audi A4	Audi/Ric Wood	13	(United Kingdom) Rob Austin	2–3
Rob Austin Racing	Audi A4	Audi/Lehmann	13	(United Kingdom) Rob Austin	4–10
Rob Austin Racing	Audi A4	Audi/Lehmann	31	(United Kingdom) Chris Swanwick	9–10
Welch Automotive	Proton GEN•2	TOCA/Swindon	42	(United Kingdom) Daniel Welch	6–10
Speedworks Motorsport	Toyota Avensis	TOCA/Swindon	50	(United Kingdom) Tony Hughes	1–2, 4, 6, 9–10
Thorney Motorsport	Vauxhall Insignia	TOCA/Swindon	67	(United Kingdom) John Thorne	10
Independent S2000 Entries (NGTC Engine)
Airwaves Racing	Ford Focus ST Mk.II	Ford/Mountune	6	(United Kingdom) Michael Caine	8–9
Airwaves Racing	Ford Focus ST Mk.II	Ford/Mountune	6	(United Kingdom) James Thompson	10
Airwaves Racing	Ford Focus ST Mk.II	Ford/Mountune	7	(United Kingdom) Mat Jackson	All
Airwaves Racing	Ford Focus ST Mk.II	Ford/Mountune	66	(United Kingdom) Liam Griffin	All
888 Racing with Collins Contractors	Vauxhall Vectra	TOCA/Swindon	14	(United Kingdom) James Nash	All
888 Racing with Collins Contractors	Vauxhall Vectra	TOCA/Swindon	34	(United Kingdom) Tony Gilham	1–6
888 Racing with Collins Contractors	Vauxhall Vectra	TOCA/Swindon	48	(United Kingdom) Ollie Jackson	9–10
888 Racing with Collins Contractors	Vauxhall Vectra	TOCA/Swindon	88	(Republic of Ireland) Árón Smith	7
Special Tuning Racing	SEAT León	SEAT/Lehmann	17	(United Kingdom) Dave Newsham	4–10
Special Tuning Racing	SEAT León	SEAT/Lehmann	22	(United Kingdom) Tom Boardman	All
Geoff Steel Racing	BMW 320si	TOCA/Swindon	34	(United Kingdom) Tony Gilham	10
Pirtek Racing	Vauxhall Vectra	TOCA/Swindon	55	(United Kingdom) Jeff Smith	All
Pirtek Racing	Vauxhall Vectra	TOCA/Swindon	77	(United Kingdom) Andrew Jordan	All
AmD Milltek Racing.com	Volkswagen Golf	Volkswagen/Lehmann	99	(United Kingdom) Tom Onslow-Cole	1–4
AmD Milltek Racing.com	Volkswagen Golf	Volkswagen/Lehmann	99	(United Kingdom) Shaun Hollamby	5
AmD Milltek Racing.com	Volkswagen Golf	Volkswagen/Lehmann	99	(United Kingdom) Martin Byford	6–10
Independent S2000 Entries
WSR	BMW 320si	BMW/Schnitzer	8	(United Kingdom) Rob Collard	All
WSR	BMW 320si	BMW/Schnitzer	18	(United Kingdom) Nick Foster	All
Geoff Steel Racing	BMW 320si	BMW/Schnitzer	17	(United Kingdom) Dave Newsham	1–2
Geoff Steel Racing	BMW 320si	BMW/Schnitzer	34	(United Kingdom) Tony Gilham	8–9
GoMobileUK.com with tech-speed	Chevrolet Cruze LT	Chevrolet/RML	28	(United Kingdom) John George	All
GoMobileUK.com with tech-speed	Chevrolet Cruze LT	Chevrolet/RML	29	(United Kingdom) Paul O'Neill	All
Team ES Racing	Chevrolet Lacetti	Chevrolet/RML	78	(United Kingdom) Chris James	All
Independent BTC-T Entries
Central Group Racing	Honda Integra Type-R	Honda/Neil Brown	43	(United Kingdom) Lea Wood	4–6, 8–10

=== Driver changes ===
Changed teams

- Andy Neate will move from West Surrey Racing to partner Tom Chilton at Team Aon.
- Tom Onslow-Cole will move from Team Aon to race for AmD Milltek Racing with YourRacingCar.
- After driving for his own team in 2010, David Pinkney will drive an Audi for Rob Austin Racing.

Entering/re-entering BTCC

- Nick Foster will début in the series, partnering Rob Collard at West Surrey Racing.
- Tony Gilham will enter the series after three years in the Porsche Carrera Cup Great Britain, with Triple 8.
- Having competed for Motorbase Performance in the Porsche Carrera Cup Great Britain, Liam Griffin will step up into the championship.
- Tony Hughes will enter the series with Speedworks Motorsport, having driven for the team in the Ginetta G50 Cup.
- Chris James, who previously raced in the Mini Challenge, will race for his own Team ES Racing.
- Renault Clio Cup champion Dave Newsham moved into the BTCC with Geoff Steel Racing.
- Jeff Smith will move into the series full-time – having finished eighth in the Renault Clio Cup – after contesting the Knockhill round for Triple 8 in 2010. He will join Pirtek Racing.
- Ginetta G50 Cup champion Frank Wrathall will also graduate into the championship with his family-run Dynojet team.

Leaving BTCC

- Shaun Hollamby will revert to a team principal role within the AmD Milltek Racing with YourRacingCar team.
- Steven Kane will move into sportscars, racing in the SPEED EuroSeries with HMR.

=== Team changes ===
- Rob Austin will enter the series, with his own team running two Audi A4s to NGTC specification.
- Dynojet will enter the series, running a single NGTC Toyota Avensis.
- Speedworks Motorsport will enter the series, becoming the first team to commit to the new Next Generation Touring Car, running two cars.
- Motorbase Performance will switch from BMWs to Fords, running under the Airwaves Racing banner.
- Geoff Steel will enter the series running a BMW for Dave Newsham.

=== Mid-season changes ===
Driver changes

- After originally joining the series as team principal of his own team, Rob Austin made his début at Donington Park replacing David Pinkney, due to the latter's business commitments.
- During the fourth round at Oulton Park, Tom Onslow-Cole left AmD Milltek Racing with YourRacingCar and later announced a return to Team Aon alongside Tom Chilton and Andy Neate.
- Prior to the Oulton Park round Dave Newsham left Geoff Steel Racing and moved to Special Tuning Racing.
- Shaun Hollamby made a return for one round at Croft for his own team AmD Milltek Racing with YourRacingCar. From Snetterton and onwards Martin Byford took the seat.
- Daniel Welch entered the series with his family-run team Welch Racing running NGTC Proton Gen-2 from Snetterton and onwards.
- After Snetterton Tony Gilham left Triple 8 and at Rockingham he returned with GSR.
- Árón Smith made his series début, replacing Gilham at Triple 8 for the round at Knockhill only.
- Michael Caine made his series début at Rockingham for Airwaves Racing, after six years racing in the Porsche Carrera Cup Great Britain.
- Ollie Jackson entered for the final 2 rounds of the season with Triple 8.
- James Thompson returned for the final round at Silverstone with Airwaves Racing, replacing Caine.
- John Thorne entered the series with Thorney Motorsport.

Team changes

- Geoff Steel Racing were absent from Truxton to Rockingham after failing to secure a replacement for the departed Newsham. From Rockingham Tony Gilham was the sole entry for the team, including NGTC engine swap for the final round.
- Welch Motorsport entered a single NGTC Proton Gen-2 in the second half of the 2011 season, with a debut at Snetterton. The car was driven by Daniel Welch.
- Triple 8 entered a single car for James Nash at Rockingham.
- Thorney Motorsport entered the series at the Silverstone round, running NGTC Vauxhall Insignia for the team owner John Thorne.

== Race calendar and results ==
All races were held in the United Kingdom. The calendar was announced by the championship organisers on 8 September 2010, with no major changes from 2010.

Round		Circuit	Date	Pole position	Fastest lap	Winning driver	Winning team
1	R1	Brands Hatch (Indy), Kent	3 April	(United Kingdom) Matt Neal	(United Kingdom) James Nash	(United Kingdom) Jason Plato	Silverline Chevrolet
1	R2	Brands Hatch (Indy), Kent	3 April		(United Kingdom) Matt Neal	(United Kingdom) Jason Plato	Silverline Chevrolet
1	R3	Brands Hatch (Indy), Kent	3 April		(United Kingdom) Matt Neal	(United Kingdom) Matt Neal	Honda Racing Team
2	R4	Donington Park (National), Leicestershire	17 April	(United Kingdom) Matt Neal	(United Kingdom) Matt Neal	(United Kingdom) Matt Neal	Honda Racing Team
2	R5	Donington Park (National), Leicestershire	17 April		(United Kingdom) Tom Boardman	(United Kingdom) Andrew Jordan	Pirtek Racing
2	R6	Donington Park (National), Leicestershire	17 April		(United Kingdom) Mat Jackson	(United Kingdom) Mat Jackson	Airwaves Racing
3	R7	Thruxton Circuit, Hampshire	1 May	(United Kingdom) Gordon Shedden	(United Kingdom) Mat Jackson	(United Kingdom) Gordon Shedden	Honda Racing Team
3	R8	Thruxton Circuit, Hampshire	1 May		(United Kingdom) Alex MacDowall	(United Kingdom) Matt Neal	Honda Racing Team
3	R9	Thruxton Circuit, Hampshire	1 May		(United Kingdom) Jason Plato	(United Kingdom) Jason Plato	Silverline Chevrolet
4	R10	Oulton Park (Island), Cheshire	5 June	(United Kingdom) Gordon Shedden	(United Kingdom) Dave Newsham	(United Kingdom) Gordon Shedden	Honda Racing Team
4	R11	Oulton Park (Island), Cheshire	5 June		(United Kingdom) Gordon Shedden	(United Kingdom) Jason Plato	Silverline Chevrolet
4	R12	Oulton Park (Island), Cheshire	5 June		(United Kingdom) Matt Neal	(United Kingdom) Mat Jackson	Airwaves Racing
5	R13	Croft Circuit, North Yorkshire	19 June	(United Kingdom) Jason Plato	(United Kingdom) Mat Jackson	(United Kingdom) Matt Neal	Honda Racing Team
5	R14	Croft Circuit, North Yorkshire	19 June		(United Kingdom) Matt Neal	(United Kingdom) Matt Neal	Honda Racing Team
5	R15	Croft Circuit, North Yorkshire	19 June		(United Kingdom) Rob Collard	(United Kingdom) Mat Jackson	Airwaves Racing
6	R16	Snetterton (300) Circuit, Norfolk	7 August	(United Kingdom) Jason Plato	(United Kingdom) Jason Plato	(United Kingdom) Jason Plato	Silverline Chevrolet
6	R17	Snetterton (300) Circuit, Norfolk	7 August		(United Kingdom) Rob Austin	(United Kingdom) Gordon Shedden	Honda Racing Team
6	R18	Snetterton (300) Circuit, Norfolk	7 August		(United Kingdom) Mat Jackson	(United Kingdom) Mat Jackson	Airwaves Racing
7	R19	Knockhill Racing Circuit, Fife	4 September	(United Kingdom) Tom Chilton	(United Kingdom) Tom Chilton	(United Kingdom) Tom Chilton	Team Aon
7	R20	Knockhill Racing Circuit, Fife	4 September		(United Kingdom) Mat Jackson	(United Kingdom) Gordon Shedden	Honda Racing Team
7	R21	Knockhill Racing Circuit, Fife	4 September		(United Kingdom) Frank Wrathall	(United Kingdom) Tom Boardman	Special Tuning Racing
8	R22	Rockingham Motor Speedway, Northamptonshire	18 September	(United Kingdom) Jason Plato	(United Kingdom) Frank Wrathall	(United Kingdom) Jason Plato	Silverline Chevrolet
8	R23	Rockingham Motor Speedway, Northamptonshire	18 September		(United Kingdom) Gordon Shedden	(United Kingdom) Gordon Shedden	Honda Racing Team
8	R24	Rockingham Motor Speedway, Northamptonshire	18 September		(United Kingdom) Jason Plato	(United Kingdom) James Nash	888 Racing with Collins Contractors
9	R25	Brands Hatch (GP), Kent	2 October	(United Kingdom) Jason Plato	(United Kingdom) Jason Plato	(United Kingdom) Jason Plato	Silverline Chevrolet
9	R26	Brands Hatch (GP), Kent	2 October		(United Kingdom) Jason Plato	(United Kingdom) Jason Plato	Silverline Chevrolet
9	R27	Brands Hatch (GP), Kent	2 October		(United Kingdom) Matt Neal	(United Kingdom) Matt Neal	Honda Racing Team
10	R28	Silverstone (National), Northamptonshire	16 October	(United Kingdom) Matt Neal	(United Kingdom) Mat Jackson	(United Kingdom) Matt Neal	Honda Racing Team
10	R29	Silverstone (National), Northamptonshire	16 October		(United Kingdom) Mat Jackson	(United Kingdom) Gordon Shedden	Honda Racing Team
10	R30	Silverstone (National), Northamptonshire	16 October		(United Kingdom) James Thompson	(United Kingdom) Tom Chilton	Team Aon

== Championship standings ==
Points system
**1st**	**2nd**	**3rd**	**4th**	**5th**	**6th**	**7th**	**8th**	**9th**	**10th**	Fastest lap	Lead a lap
15	12	10	8	6	5	4	3	2	1	1	1

- No driver may collect more than one "Lead a Lap" point per race no matter how many laps they lead.
- Race 1 polesitter receives 1 point.

=== Drivers' Championship ===
(key)

Pos	Driver	BHI			DON			THR			OUL			CRO			SNE			KNO			ROC			BHGP			SIL			Pts
1	(United Kingdom) Matt Neal	**Ret**	7	**1***	**1***	**3**	7	2*	1*	5	8*	Ret	4	1*	**1***	7	18	17	4	2	2*	4	4	3	6	18	7	1*	**1***	**2**	8	257
2	(United Kingdom) Gordon Shedden	6	2	4	DSQ	6	Ret	**1***	**2***	6	**1***	**6***	2	5	4	6	3	1*	7	3	1*	5	6	1*	21	19	8	2*	2	1*	10	249
3	(United Kingdom) Jason Plato	1*	**1***	5	18	Ret	6	Ret	8	1*	2	1*	11	**4**	Ret	11	**1***	**3**	3	7	7	**Ret***	**1***	**4***	5	**1***	**1***	6	Ret	7	2	236
4	(United Kingdom) Mat Jackson	4	3	2	5	10	1*	6	5	2	Ret	9	**1***	2	5	1*	6	6	1*	19	Ret	Ret	Ret	Ret	13	2	2	5	20	26	21	191
5	(United Kingdom) James Nash	2	4	6	3*	2	3	8	6	4	4	2	13	8	11	5	5	2	6	6	8	15	9	6	1*	4	6	3	3	15	17	191
6	(United Kingdom) Andrew Jordan	16	6	20	2	1*	2	3	3	7	10	4	3	6	3	4	12	9	14	9	9	7	Ret	13	8	DNS	16	8	7	5	5	143
7	(United Kingdom) Tom Chilton	3	8	8	4	4	Ret	4	4	Ret	17	10	7	7	6	9	9	12	13	**1***	**4***	6	13	11	18	7	5	4	12	8	1*	135
8	(United Kingdom) Rob Collard	17	9	7	6	5	Ret	12	14	13	5	3	14	3	2	3	23	10	12	5	5	2	Ret	10	**3**	8	22	Ret	8	23	23	108
9	(United Kingdom) Alex MacDowall	5	13	16	9	9	**4***	10	7	8	3	5	18	14	Ret	8	2	4	5	12	Ret	10	12	15	11	3	Ret	Ret	5	9	**4**	100
10	(United Kingdom) Paul O'Neill	7	5	3	8	Ret	8	13	11	14	13	7	Ret	9	Ret	Ret	7	5	2	13	14	Ret	2	7	4	6	4	Ret	Ret	Ret	12	91
11	(United Kingdom) Tom Boardman	Ret	Ret	10	7	Ret	Ret	5	9	**3**	Ret	NC	5	10	Ret	Ret	Ret	DNS	DNS	8	6	1*	8	Ret	10	Ret	11	9	Ret	6	3	76
12	(United Kingdom) Frank Wrathall	Ret	DNS	DNS	16	NC	NC	Ret	DNS	Ret	Ret	13	Ret	12	Ret	Ret	4	Ret	DNS	4	3	3	3	2	9	Ret	13	Ret	10	25	9	65
13	(United Kingdom) Tom Onslow-Cole	13	Ret	12	11	7	Ret	7	DNS	10	11	16	DNS	11	10	13	8	8	11	Ret	11	8	19	12	Ret	5	3	7	4	3	7	61
14	(United Kingdom) Nick Foster	12	14	14	12	Ret	10	15	16	17	6	8	9	13	7	**2**	13	11	9	11	10	9	5	5	12	10	10	**10**	13	Ret	16	47
15	(United Kingdom) Dave Newsham	10	11	11	Ret	15	Ret				12	17	8	19	8	10	10	7	**8***	15	12	11	Ret	Ret	15	Ret	17	11	6	4	Ret	31
16	(United Kingdom) Rob Austin				Ret	Ret	13	Ret	DNS	DNS	Ret	12	16	Ret	NC	Ret	15	Ret	10	Ret	Ret	Ret	7	9	2*	13	14	13	Ret	12	6	26
17	(United Kingdom) Jeff Smith	9	16	13	10	13	5	9	12	11	Ret	Ret	10	15	Ret	14	11	16	17	16	18	14	14	8	7	Ret	24	14	17	16	25	19
18	(United Kingdom) Andy Neate	11	12	15	14	11	Ret	16	13	12	9	15	6	Ret	9	Ret	16	Ret	Ret	14	15	13	11	Ret	DNS	9	9	Ret	9	11	Ret	15
19	(United Kingdom) Tony Gilham	8	10	9	15	8	Ret	11	10	9	14	Ret	12	Ret	12	12	Ret	13	15				15	14	17	15	23	Ret	Ret	19	19	12
20	(United Kingdom) Lea Wood										7	11	15	16	15	19	Ret	15	18				DNS	DNS	DNS	Ret	21	Ret	18	17	20	4
21	(United Kingdom) Liam Griffin	Ret	18	18	13	Ret	9	14	17	15	15	18	Ret	18	Ret	16	17	14	Ret	Ret	Ret	16	16	16	19	16	19	15	15	14	13	2
22	(United Kingdom) Daniel Welch																22	18	19	NC	16	12	Ret	Ret	14	Ret	Ret	DSQ	11	10	14	1
23	(United Kingdom) Michael Caine																						10	Ret	20	12	12	12				1
24	(Republic of Ireland) Árón Smith																			10	13	Ret										1
25	(United Kingdom) James Thompson																												Ret	Ret	18	1
26	(United Kingdom) Ollie Jackson																									11	18	17	16	13	11	0
27	(United Kingdom) John George	14	15	17	Ret	12	11	17	15	16	Ret	Ret	Ret	Ret	14	17	19	Ret	Ret	17	Ret	Ret	17	19	22	14	20	20	14	20	22	0
28	(United Kingdom) Chris James	15	17	19	17	14	12	18	Ret	18	Ret	Ret	DNS	Ret	Ret	18	20	DNS	Ret	18	17	17	18	17	23	20	25	18	21	22	24	0
29	(United Kingdom) Shaun Hollamby													17	13	15																0
30	(United Kingdom) Martin Byford																14	Ret	16	Ret	Ret	Ret	20	18	16	22	15	16	Ret	24	15	0
31	(United Kingdom) Tony Hughes	Ret	19	21	19	16	Ret				16	14	17				21	Ret	DNS							21	26	21	19	21	Ret	0
32	(United Kingdom) Chris Swanwick																									17	27	19	22	18	Ret	0
	(United Kingdom) John Thorne																												Ret	DNS	DNS	0
	(United Kingdom) David Pinkney	DNS	DNS	DNS																												0
Pos	Driver	BHI			DON			THR			OUL			CRO			SNE			KNO			ROC			BHGP			SIL			Pts
Sources:

- Note: **bold** signifies pole position (1 point given in first race only, and race 2 and 3 poles are based on race results), italics signifies fastest lap (1 point given all races) and * signifies at least one lap in the lead (1 point given all races).

=== Manufacturers'/Constructors' Championship ===
Pos	Manufacturer/Constructor	BHI			DON			THR			OUL			CRO			SNE			KNO			ROC			BHGP			SIL			Pts
1	Honda / Honda Racing Team	6	2	1	1	3	7	1	1	5	1	6	2	1	1	6	3	1	4	2	1	4	4	1	6	18	7	1	1	1	8	621
1	Honda / Honda Racing Team	Ret	7	4	DSQ	6	Ret	2	2	6	8	Ret	4	5	4	7	18	17	7	3	2	5	6	3	21	19	8	2	2	2	10	621
2	Chevrolet / Silverline Chevrolet	1	1	5	9	9	4	10	7	1	2	1	11	4	Ret	8	1	3	3	7	7	10	1	4	5	1	1	6	5	7	2	496
2	Chevrolet / Silverline Chevrolet	5	13	16	18	Ret	6	Ret	8	8	3	5	18	14	Ret	11	2	4	5	12	Ret	Ret	12	15	11	3	Ret	Ret	Ret	9	4	496
3	Ford / Team Aon	3	8	8	4	4	Ret	4	4	12	9	10	6	7	6	9	8	8	11	1	4	6	11	11	18	5	3	4	4	3	1	438
3	Ford / Team Aon	11	12	15	14	11	Ret	16	13	Ret	17	15	7	11	9	13	9	12	13	14	11	8	13	12	Ret	7	5	7	9	8	7	438
Pos	Manufacturer/Constructor	BHI			DON			THR			OUL			CRO			SNE			KNO			ROC			BHGP			SIL			Pts

=== Teams' Championship ===
Pos	Team	BHI			DON			THR			OUL			CRO			SNE			KNO			ROC			BHGP			SIL			Pts
1	Honda Racing Team	6	2	1	1	3	7	1	1	5	1	6	2	1	1	6	3	1	4	2	1	4	4	1	6	18	7	1	1	1	8	464
1	Honda Racing Team	Ret	7	4	DSQ	6	Ret	2	2	6	8	Ret	4	5	4	7	18	17	7	3	2	5	6	3	21	19	8	2	2	2	10	464
2	Silverline Chevrolet	1	1	5	9	9	4	10	7	1	2	1	11	4	Ret	8	1	3	3	7	7	10	1	4	5	1	1	6	5	7	2	295
2	Silverline Chevrolet	5	13	16	18	Ret	6	Ret	8	8	3	5	18	14	Ret	11	2	4	5	12	Ret	Ret	12	15	11	3	Ret	Ret	Ret	9	4	295
3	888 Racing with Collins Contractors	2	4	6	3	2	3	8	6	4	4	2	12	8	11	5	5	2	6	6	8	15	9	6	1	4	6	3	3	13	11	203
3	888 Racing with Collins Contractors	8	10	9	15	8	Ret	11	10	9	14	Ret	13	Ret	12	12	Ret	13	15	10	13	Ret				11	18	17	16	15	17	203
4	Team Aon	3	8	8	4	4	Ret	4	4	12	9	10	6	7	6	9	8	8	11	1	4	6	11	11	18	5	3	4	4	3	1	192
4	Team Aon	11	12	15	14	11	Ret	16	13	Ret	17	15	7	11	9	13	9	12	13	14	11	8	13	12	Ret	7	5	7	9	8	7	192
5	Airwaves Racing	4	3	2	5	10	1	6	5	2	15	9	1	2	5	1	6	6	1	19	Ret	16	10	16	13	2	2	5	15	14	13	183
5	Airwaves Racing	Ret	18	18	13	Ret	9	14	17	15	Ret	18	Ret	18	Ret	16	17	14	Ret	Ret	Ret	Ret	16	Ret	19	12	12	12	20	26	18	183
6	WSR	12	9	7	6	5	10	12	14	13	5	3	9	3	2	2	13	10	9	5	5	2	5	5	3	8	10	10	8	23	16	156
6	WSR	17	14	14	12	Ret	Ret	15	16	17	6	8	14	13	7	3	23	11	12	11	10	9	Ret	10	12	10	22	Ret	13	Ret	23	156
7	Pirtek Racing	9	6	13	2	1	2	3	3	7	10	4	3	6	3	4	11	9	14	9	9	7	14	8	7	Ret	16	8	7	5	5	151
7	Pirtek Racing	16	16	20	10	13	5	9	12	11	Ret	Ret	10	15	Ret	14	12	16	17	16	18	14	Ret	13	8	DNS	24	14	17	16	25	151
8	GoMobileUK.com with tech-speed	7	5	3	8	12	8	13	11	14	13	7	Ret	9	14	17	7	5	2	13	14	Ret	2	7	4	6	4	20	14	20	12	91
8	GoMobileUK.com with tech-speed	14	15	17	Ret	Ret	11	17	15	16	Ret	Ret	Ret	Ret	Ret	Ret	19	Ret	Ret	17	Ret	Ret	17	19	22	14	20	Ret	Ret	Ret	22	91
9	Special Tuning Racing	Ret	Ret	10	7	Ret	Ret	5	9	3	12	17	5	10	8	10	10	7	8	8	6	1	8	Ret	10	Ret	11	9	6	4	3	83
9	Special Tuning Racing										Ret	NC	8	19	Ret	Ret	Ret	DNS	DNS	15	12	11	Ret	Ret	15	Ret	17	11	Ret	6	Ret	83
10	Dynojet	Ret	DNS	DNS	16	NC	NC	Ret	DNS	Ret	Ret	13	Ret	12	Ret	Ret	4	Ret	DNS	4	3	3	3	2	9	Ret	13	Ret	10	25	9	55
11	Rob Austin Racing	DNS	DNS	DNS	Ret	Ret	13	Ret	DNS	DNS	Ret	12	16	Ret	NC	Ret	15	Ret	10	Ret	Ret	Ret	7	9	2	13	14	13	22	12	6	24
11	Rob Austin Racing																									17	27	19	Ret	18	Ret	24
12	AmD Milltek Racing.com	13	Ret	12	11	7	Ret	7	DNS	10	11	16	DNS	17	13	15	14	Ret	16	Ret	Ret	Ret	20	18	16	22	15	16	Ret	24	15	9
13	Central Group Racing										7	11	15	16	15	19	Ret	15	18				DNS	DNS	DNS	Ret	21	Ret	18	17	20	4
14	Welch Automotive																22	18	19	NC	16	12	Ret	Ret	14	Ret	Ret	DSQ	11	10	14	1
15	Geoff Steel Racing	10	11	11	Ret	15	Ret																15	14	17	15	23	Ret	Ret	19	19	1
16	Team ES Racing	15	17	19	17	14	12	18	Ret	18	Ret	Ret	DNS	Ret	Ret	18	20	DNS	Ret	18	17	17	18	17	23	20	25	18	21	22	24	0
17	Speedworks Motorsport	Ret	19	21	19	16	Ret				16	14	17				21	Ret	DNS							21	26	21	19	21	Ret	0
	Thorney Motorsport																												Ret	DNS	DNS	0
Pos	Team	BHI			DON			THR			OUL			CRO			SNE			KNO			ROC			BHGP			SIL			Pts

=== Independents' Trophy ===
Pos	Driver	BHI			DON			THR			OUL			CRO			SNE			KNO			ROC			BHGP			SIL			Pts
1	(United Kingdom) James Nash	2	**4**	6	**3**	2	3	8	6	4	4	**2**	13	8	11	5	**5**	2	6	6	8	15	9	6	1	4	6	3	3	**15**	17	268
2	(United Kingdom) Mat Jackson	4	3	2	5	10	1	6	5	2	Ret	9	**1**	2	**5**	1	6	6	1	19	Ret	Ret	Ret	Ret	13	2	**2**	5	**20**	26	21	236
3	(United Kingdom) Andrew Jordan	**16**	6	**20**	2	**1**	2	**3**	**3**	7	10	4	3	6	3	4	12	9	14	9	9	7	Ret	13	8	**DNS**	16	8	7	5	5	209
4	(United Kingdom) Tom Chilton	3	8	8	4	4	Ret	4	4	Ret	17	10	7	7	6	9	9	12	13	**1**	**4**	6	13	11	18	7	5	4	12	8	**1**	197
5	(United Kingdom) Rob Collard	17	9	7	6	5	Ret	12	14	13	5	3	14	**3**	2	3	23	10	12	5	5	2	Ret	10	**3**	8	22	Ret	8	23	23	157
6	(United Kingdom) Paul O'Neill	7	5	3	8	Ret	8	13	11	14	13	7	Ret	9	Ret	Ret	7	5	2	13	14	Ret	**2**	**7**	4	6	4	Ret	Ret	Ret	12	147
7	(United Kingdom) Tom Onslow-Cole	13	Ret	12	11	7	Ret	7	DNS	10	11	16	DNS	11	10	13	8	8	11	Ret	11	8	19	12	Ret	5	3	7	4	3	7	123
8	(United Kingdom) Tom Boardman	Ret	Ret	10	7	Ret	Ret	5	9	**3**	Ret	NC	5	10	Ret	Ret	Ret	DNS	DNS	8	6	**1**	8	Ret	10	Ret	11	9	Ret	6	3	117
9	(United Kingdom) Nick Foster	12	14	14	12	Ret	10	15	16	17	6	8	9	13	7	**2**	13	11	9	11	10	9	5	5	12	10	10	**10**	13	Ret	16	104
10	(United Kingdom) Frank Wrathall	Ret	DNS	DNS	16	NC	NC	Ret	DNS	Ret	Ret	13	Ret	12	Ret	Ret	4	**Ret**	DNS	4	3	3	3	2	9	Ret	13	Ret	10	25	9	96
11	(United Kingdom) Dave Newsham	10	11	11	Ret	15	Ret				12	17	8	19	8	10	10	7	**8**	15	12	11	Ret	Ret	15	Ret	17	11	6	4	Ret	77
12	(United Kingdom) Andy Neate	11	12	15	14	11	Ret	16	13	12	**9**	15	6	Ret	9	Ret	16	Ret	Ret	14	15	13	11	Ret	DNS	9	9	Ret	9	11	Ret	54
13	(United Kingdom) Jeff Smith	9	16	13	10	13	5	9	12	11	Ret	Ret	10	15	Ret	14	11	16	17	16	18	14	14	8	7	Ret	24	14	17	16	25	49
14	(United Kingdom) Rob Austin				Ret	Ret	13	Ret	DNS	DNS	Ret	12	16	Ret	NC	Ret	15	Ret	10	Ret	Ret	Ret	7	9	2	13	14	13	Ret	12	6	45
15	(United Kingdom) Tony Gilham	8	10	9	15	8	**Ret**	11	10	9	14	Ret	12	Ret	12	12	Ret	13	15				15	14	17	15	23	Ret	Ret	19	19	42
16	(United Kingdom) Lea Wood										7	11	15	16	15	19	Ret	15	18				DNS	DNS	DNS	Ret	21	Ret	18	17	20	11
17	(United Kingdom) Daniel Welch																22	18	19	NC	16	12	Ret	Ret	14	Ret	Ret	DSQ	11	10	14	11
18	(United Kingdom) Michael Caine																						10	Ret	20	12	12	12				9
19	(United Kingdom) Liam Griffin	Ret	18	18	13	Ret	9	14	17	15	15	18	Ret	18	Ret	16	17	14	Ret	Ret	Ret	16	16	16	19	16	19	15	15	14	13	8
20	(United Kingdom) Ollie Jackson																									11	18	17	16	13	11	8
21	(Republic of Ireland) Árón Smith																			10	13	Ret										5
22	(United Kingdom) John George	14	15	17	Ret	12	11	17	15	16	Ret	Ret	Ret	Ret	14	17	19	Ret	Ret	17	Ret	Ret	17	19	22	14	20	20	14	20	22	5
23	(United Kingdom) Chris James	15	17	19	17	14	12	18	Ret	18	Ret	Ret	DNS	Ret	Ret	18	20	DNS	Ret	18	17	17	18	17	23	20	25	18	21	22	24	2
24	(United Kingdom) Shaun Hollamby													17	13	15																0
25	(United Kingdom) Martin Byford																14	Ret	16	Ret	Ret	Ret	20	18	16	22	15	16	Ret	24	15	0
26	(United Kingdom) Tony Hughes	Ret	19	21	19	16	Ret				16	14	17				21	Ret	DNS							21	26	21	19	21	Ret	0
27	(United Kingdom) Chris Swanwick																									17	27	19	22	18	Ret	0
28	(United Kingdom) James Thompson																												Ret	Ret	18	0
	(United Kingdom) John Thorne																												Ret	DNS	DNS	0
	(United Kingdom) David Pinkney	DNS	DNS	DNS																												0
Pos	Driver	BHI			DON			THR			OUL			CRO			SNE			KNO			ROC			BHGP			SIL			Pts

=== Independent Teams' Trophy ===
Pos	Team	BHI			DON			THR			OUL			CRO			SNE			KNO			ROC			BHGP			SIL			Pts
1	888 Racing with Collins Contractors	2	4	6	3	2	3	8	6	4	4	2	12	8	11	5	5	2	6	6	8	15	9	6	1	4	6	3	3	13	11	293
2	Airwaves Racing	4	3	2	5	10	1	6	5	2	15	9	1	2	5	1	6	6	1	19	Ret	16	10	16	13	2	2	5	15	14	13	262
3	Team Aon	3	8	8	4	4	Ret	4	4	12	9	10	6	7	6	9	8	8	11	1	4	6	11	11	18	5	3	4	4	3	1	250
4	Pirtek Racing	9	6	13	2	1	2	3	3	7	10	4	3	6	3	4	11	9	14	9	9	7	14	8	7	Ret	16	8	7	5	5	225
5	WSR	12	9	7	6	5	10	12	14	13	5	3	9	3	2	2	13	10	9	5	5	2	5	5	3	8	10	10	8	23	16	218
6	GoMobileUK.com with tech-speed	7	5	3	8	12	8	13	11	14	13	7	Ret	9	14	17	7	5	2	13	14	Ret	2	7	4	6	4	20	14	20	12	177
7	Special Tuning Racing	Ret	Ret	10	7	Ret	Ret	5	9	3	12	17	5	10	8	10	10	7	8	8	6	1	8	Ret	10	Ret	11	9	6	4	3	152
8	Dynojet	Ret	DNS	DNS	16	NC	NC	Ret	DNS	Ret	Ret	13	Ret	12	Ret	Ret	4	Ret	DNS	4	3	3	3	2	9	Ret	13	Ret	10	25	9	86
9	Rob Austin Racing	DNS	DNS	DNS	Ret	Ret	13	Ret	DNS	DNS	Ret	12	16	Ret	NC	Ret	15	Ret	10	Ret	Ret	Ret	7	9	2	13	14	13	22	12	6	67
10	AmD Milltek Racing.com	13	Ret	12	11	7	Ret	7	DNS	10	11	16	DNS	17	13	15	14	Ret	16	Ret	Ret	Ret	20	18	16	22	15	16	Ret	24	15	53
11	Team ES Racing	15	17	19	17	14	12	18	Ret	18	Ret	Ret	DNS	Ret	Ret	18	20	DNS	Ret	18	17	17	18	17	23	20	25	18	21	22	24	34
12	Central Group Racing										7	11	15	16	15	19	Ret	15	18				DNS	DNS	DNS	Ret	21	Ret	18	17	20	31
13	Geoff Steel Racing	10	11	11	Ret	15	Ret																15	14	17	15	23	Ret	Ret	19	19	25
14	Welch Automotive																22	18	19	NC	16	12	Ret	Ret	14	Ret	Ret	DSQ	11	10	14	14
15	Speedworks Motorsport	Ret	19	21	19	16	Ret				16	14	17				21	Ret	DNS							21	26	21	19	21	Ret	9
	Thorney Motorsport																												Ret	DNS	DNS	0
Pos	Team	BHI			DON			THR			OUL			CRO			SNE			KNO			ROC			BHGP			SIL			Pts
