= 2008 Renault Clio Cup United Kingdom =

The 2008 Elf Renault Clio Cup United Kingdom season began at Brands Hatch on 29 March and finished after 20 races over 10 events at the same circuit on 21 September. The championship was won by Ben Winrow driving for Team Pyro.

== Changes for 2008 ==
- Entries were limited to 36 to ensure that the championship was contested over 20 races.
- The series returned to using the double-header race format as seen prior to 2007.

== Teams and drivers ==
All competitors raced in Renault Clio Cup 197s.

Team	No.	Drivers	Rounds
JHR Developments	1	(United Kingdom) Richard Cannon	1-4, 6
JHR Developments	1	(United Kingdom) Steven Hunter	5, 8
JHR Developments	1	(United Kingdom) Matt Allison	9
JHR Developments	1	(United Kingdom) Max Hunter	10
JHR Developments	3	(United Kingdom) Mark Hazell	1-3, 5-6, 8-10
JHR Developments	3	(United Kingdom) Steven Hunter	4, 7
JHR Developments	11	(United Kingdom) Paul Rivett	All
JHR Developments	43	(United Kingdom) Derek Pierce	7, 10
JHR Developments	43	(United Kingdom) Steven Hunter	9
Mardi Gras Motorsport	2	(United Kingdom) Gavin Pyper	All
Mardi Gras Motorsport	10	(Republic of Ireland) Árón Smith	All
Mardi Gras Motorsport	88	(Republic of Ireland) David Dickenson	All
Team Pyro	4	(United Kingdom) Ben Winrow	1-9
Team Pyro	5	(United Kingdom) Chris Rice	All
Team Pyro	6	(United Kingdom) Alex Dew	8-10
Team Pyro	7	(Guernsey) Chris Law	1-6, 10
Team Pyro	15	(United Kingdom) Jeff Smith	2-4, 6-10
Team Pyro	15	(United Kingdom) Neil Waterworth	5
Solutions Racing	6	(United Kingdom) Alex Dew	1-7
Solutions Racing	46	(United Kingdom) Robert Gaffney	1-2
Team Valtra	8	(United Kingdom) Peter Felix	1
Full Speed Racing	8	(United Kingdom) Peter Felix	2-3, 5-6, 8-9
Full Speed Racing	23	(United Kingdom) Chris Panayiotou	1-2, 6
Full Speed Racing	28	(United Kingdom) Phil Glew	All
Full Speed Racing	99	(United Kingdom) Glenn Bell	1-6
Full Speed Racing	99	(United Kingdom) Chaz Small	7-9
Total Control Racing	9	(United Kingdom) Alex MacDowall	All
Total Control Racing	22	(United Kingdom) Mike Robinson	All
Total Control Racing	27	(United Kingdom) Ray MacDowall	1, 3
Total Control Racing	27	(United Kingdom) Nick Adcock	2, 4-5
Total Control Racing	27	(United Kingdom) Jonathan Adam	6
Total Control Racing	27	(Italy) Fulvio Mussi	7
Total Control Racing	27	(United Kingdom) Stefan Hodgetts	8-9
Total Control Racing	77	(United Kingdom) Jonathan Ridley-Holloway	All
Coastal Racing	12	(United Kingdom) Carl Bradley	All
Coastal Racing	20	(United Kingdom) Stephen Tyldsley	2-4, 6-7, 9-10
Y4HR Miracle Drywash with SVE	14	(Austria) Niki Lanik	All
Amery Motorsport	17	(United Kingdom) David Shepherd	All
Amery Motorsport	21	(United Kingdom) Jonathan Shepherd	1-8
Amery Motorsport	21	(United Kingdom) Dave Newsham	10
Amery Motorsport	26	(United Kingdom) Rob Austin	6
P9 Raceshop/Range Storage	24	(United Kingdom) Lee Pattison	All
APO Sport	29	(United Kingdom) Alex Osborne	All
Robertshaw Racing	32	(United Kingdom) Matt Allison	7
Robertshaw Racing	43	(United Kingdom) Derek Pierce	1-6
Robertshaw Racing	46	(United Kingdom) Robert Gaffney	3-10
Team Wood Racing	44	(United Kingdom) Lea Wood	1-2, 4-10
Double Six Racing	66	(United Kingdom) Rob Boston	1-2, 4-10

== Calendar & Winners ==
The series supported the British Touring Car Championship at nine of the ten rounds. The series skipped the round at Knockhill and instead raced at the World Series by Renault meeting at Silverstone on 7–8 June.

Round		Venue	Date	Pole position	Fastest lap	Winning driver	Winning team
1	R1	Brands Hatch (Indy), Kent	29–30 March	(United Kingdom) Ben Winrow	(United Kingdom) Derek Pierce	(United Kingdom) Paul Rivett	JHR Developments
1	R2	Brands Hatch (Indy), Kent	29–30 March	(United Kingdom) Ben Winrow	(United Kingdom) Alex MacDowall	(United Kingdom) Ben Winrow	Team Pyro
2	R3	Rockingham Motor Speedway, Northamptonshire	12–13 April	(United Kingdom) Ben Winrow	(United Kingdom) Ben Winrow	(United Kingdom) Ben Winrow	Team Pyro
2	R4	Rockingham Motor Speedway, Northamptonshire	12–13 April	(United Kingdom) Ben Winrow	(United Kingdom) Ben Winrow	(United Kingdom) Paul Rivett	JHR Developments
3	R5	Donington Park (National), Leicestershire	3–4 May	(United Kingdom) Ben Winrow	(United Kingdom) Ben Winrow	(United Kingdom) Ben Winrow	Team Pyro
3	R6	Donington Park (National), Leicestershire	3–4 May	(United Kingdom) Ben Winrow	(United Kingdom) Gavin Pyper	(United Kingdom) Ben Winrow	Team Pyro
4	R7	Thruxton Circuit, Hampshire	17–18 May	(United Kingdom) Ben Winrow	(United Kingdom) Steven Hunter	(United Kingdom) Ben Winrow	Team Pyro
4	R8	Thruxton Circuit, Hampshire	17–18 May	(United Kingdom) Ben Winrow	(United Kingdom) Alex MacDowall	(United Kingdom) Paul Rivett	JHR Developments
5	R9	Croft Circuit, North Yorkshire	31 May-1 June	(United Kingdom) Paul Rivett	(United Kingdom) Paul Rivett	(United Kingdom) Paul Rivett	JHR Developments
5	R10	Croft Circuit, North Yorkshire	31 May-1 June	(United Kingdom) Ben Winrow	(United Kingdom) Paul Rivett	(United Kingdom) Paul Rivett	JHR Developments
6	R11	Silverstone Circuit (GP), Northamptonshire	7–8 June	(United Kingdom) Ben Winrow	(United Kingdom) Jonathan Adam	(United Kingdom) Jonathan Adam	Total Control Racing
6	R12	Silverstone Circuit (GP), Northamptonshire	7–8 June	(United Kingdom) Ben Winrow	(United Kingdom) Ben Winrow	(United Kingdom) Ben Winrow	Team Pyro
7	R13	Snetterton Motor Racing Circuit, Norfolk	12–13 July	(United Kingdom) Ben Winrow	(United Kingdom) Ben Winrow	(United Kingdom) Ben Winrow	Team Pyro
7	R14	Snetterton Motor Racing Circuit, Norfolk	12–13 July	(United Kingdom) Ben Winrow	(United Kingdom) Matt Allison	(United Kingdom) Ben Winrow	Team Pyro
8	R15	Oulton Park (Island), Cheshire	26–27 July	(United Kingdom) Gavin Pyper	(United Kingdom) Lea Wood	(United Kingdom) Ben Winrow	Team Pyro
8	R16	Oulton Park (Island), Cheshire	26–27 July	(United Kingdom) Ben Winrow	(United Kingdom) Ben Winrow	(United Kingdom) Stefan Hodgetts	Total Control Racing
9	R17	Silverstone Circuit (National), Northamptonshire	30–31 August	(United Kingdom) Paul Rivett	(United Kingdom) Ben Winrow	(United Kingdom) Stefan Hodgetts	Total Control Racing
9	R18	Silverstone Circuit (National), Northamptonshire	30–31 August	(United Kingdom) Paul Rivett	(United Kingdom) Steven Hunter	(United Kingdom) Lee Pattison	P9 Raceshop/Range Storage
10	R19	Brands Hatch (Indy), Kent	20–21 September	(Austria) Niki Lanik	(United Kingdom) Paul Rivett (United Kingdom) Alex MacDowall	(United Kingdom) Paul Rivett	JHR Developments
10	R20	Brands Hatch (Indy), Kent	20–21 September	(Austria) Niki Lanik	(United Kingdom) David Shepherd	(United Kingdom) Paul Rivett	JHR Developments

== Standings ==
Points were awarded on a 32, 28, 25, 22, 20, 18, 16, 14, 12, 11, 10, 9, 8, 7, 6, 5, 4, 3, 2, 1 basis to the top 20 finishers in each race, with 2 bonus points for the fastest lap in each race. A driver's best 18 scores counted towards the championship.

=== Drivers' Championship ===
Pos	Driver	BHI		ROC		DON		THR		CRO		SIL		SNE		OUL		SIL		BHI		Total	Drop	Pen	Pts
1	(United Kingdom) Ben Winrow	2	1	1	2	1	1	1	20	2	2	2	1	1	1	1	2	3	DNS			496		1^{1}	495
2	(United Kingdom) Paul Rivett	1	2	3	1	Ret	DNS	5	1	1	1	4	5	9	Ret	3	10	2	7	1	1	437			437
3	(United Kingdom) Phil Glew	3	5	12	10	7	6	4	7	3	3	3	3	2	4	5	Ret	Ret	Ret	5	6	345			345
4	(United Kingdom) Carl Bradley	NC	8	4	4	5	4	10	5	4	Ret	11	Ret	8	14	4	5	9	19	6	4	280		2^{2}	278
5	(Austria) Niki Lanik	17	3	16	Ret	Ret	Ret	6	3	5	4	6	Ret	19	21	7	4	8	5	2	3	264		2^{3}	262
6	(United Kingdom) Mike Robinson	11	9	18	7	4	2	8	Ret	16	17	8	7	Ret	8	6	3	6	12	7	Ret	244		3	241
7	(United Kingdom) Alex MacDowall	15	6	19	22	18	10	3	4	15	11	5	4	Ret	5	Ret	Ret	5	16	8	5	230		2	228
8	(United Kingdom) Rob Boston	9	15	5	Ret			20	18	6	Ret	Ret	9	10	7	11	8	7	4	4	2	211			211
9	(Republic of Ireland) Árón Smith	4	7	8	8	11	8	13	13	10	6	14	15	12	13	15	7	11	9	11	Ret	219	6	7	206
10	(United Kingdom) Lee Pattison	Ret	DNS	7	6	6	9	Ret	17	9	Ret	20	10	7	10	Ret	13	4	1	14	8	202			202
11	(United Kingdom) Gavin Pyper	7	Ret	2	18	Ret	3	16	14	DSQ	5	9	6	6	11	Ret	Ret	10	8	13	Ret	197		10	187
12	(United Kingdom) Robert Gaffney	6	19	15	14	3	5	22	10	14	13	10	8	4	2	Ret	Ret	Ret	Ret	20	17	184			184
13	(United Kingdom) Steven Hunter							2	2	20	12			5	3	9	DNS	DNS	2			155			155
14	(United Kingdom) Alex Osborne	Ret	22	11	Ret	15	13	11	12	7	8	15	11	Ret	20	8	6	14	15	Ret	9	147		2	145
15	(United Kingdom) Jonathan Ridley-Holloway	Ret	17	9	17	12	Ret	9	Ret	12	7	18	12	16	9	Ret	11	16	Ret	9	7	138			138
16	(United Kingdom) Lea Wood	12	11	25	Ret			14	15	11	Ret	17	18	13	Ret	2	9	DNS	14	21	10	117		2^{4}	115
17	(United Kingdom) Derek Pierce	14	4	10	12	2	Ret	Ret	Ret	Ret	10	28	14	Ret	19					10	Ret	110		2	108
18	(United Kingdom) Alex Dew	8	Ret	14	16	16	14	Ret	19	19	16	24	Ret	11	16	17	15	17	10	17	16	96		2^{5}	94
19	(United Kingdom) Stefan Hodgetts															14	1	1	3			96		3^{6}	93
20	(United Kingdom) Glenn Bell	13	Ret	13	5	8	7	Ret	9	Ret	14	DNS	DNS									85			85
21	(United Kingdom) Richard Cannon	Ret	13	6	3	Ret	16	19	22			7	13									82			82
22	(United Kingdom) Peter Felix	10	12	17	9	13	15			Ret	Ret	23	19			13	14	18	13			78		3^{7}	75
23	(United Kingdom) Chris Rice	DNS	16	24	23	19	12	Ret	Ret	17	18	16	16	15	Ret	Ret	12	13	17	15	11	76		2^{8}	74
24	(United Kingdom) David Shepherd	Ret	14	20	13	Ret	11	7	6	Ret	Ret	25	Ret	14	8	Ret	Ret	Ret	Ret	23	15	78		8^{9}	70
25	(United Kingdom) Stephen Tyldsley			Ret	11	9	Ret	15	8			13	Ret	Ret	15			15	20	12	14	79		9^{10}	70
26	(Republic of Ireland) David Dickenson	5	Ret	26	Ret	14	Ret	17	11	Ret	Ret	12	Ret	18	22	16	17	19	18	19	19	71		2^{11}	69
27	(United Kingdom) Jonathan Adam											1	2									62			62
28	(United Kingdom) Matt Allison													3	12			Ret	6			54			54
29	(United Kingdom) Nick Adcock			21	15			12	21	8	9											41			41
30	(Guernsey) Chris Law	16	10	23	21	DSQ	17	18	16	13	15	19	Ret							18	13	55		19^{12}	36
31	(United Kingdom) Chaz Small													Ret	17	10	Ret	12	11			34			34
32	(United Kingdom) Dave Newsham																			3	Ret	25			25
33	(United Kingdom) Jeff Smith			Ret	25	20	18	Ret	23			22	17	Ret	23	12	16	21	Ret	22	18	25			25
34	(Italy) Fulvio Mussi													17	6							22			22
35	(United Kingdom) Mark Hazell	19	18	Ret	24	17	Ret			Ret	19	26	20			18	DNS	20	DNS	Ret	Ret	16		2	14
36	(United Kingdom) Max Hunter																			16	12	14		2^{13}	12
37	(United Kingdom) Ray MacDowall	DNS	21			10	Ret															11			11
38	(United Kingdom) Jonathan Shepherd	18	23	27	19	21	Ret	21	24	21	Ret	Ret	21	20	24	19	18					11		6^{14}	5
39	(United Kingdom) Neil Waterworth									18	Ret											3			3
40	(United Kingdom) Chris Panayiotou	Ret	20	22	20							21	Ret									2			2
41	(United Kingdom) Rob Austin											27	Ret									0			0
Pos	Driver	BHI		ROC		DON		THR		CRO		SIL		SNE		OUL		SIL		BHI		Total	Drop	Pen	Pts

Colour	Result
Gold	Winner
Silver	Second place
Bronze	Third place
Green	Points classification
Blue	Non-points classification
Blue	Non-classified finish (NC)
Purple	Retired, not classified (Ret)
Red	Did not qualify (DNQ)
Red	Did not pre-qualify (DNPQ)
Black	Disqualified (DSQ)
White	Did not start (DNS)
White	Withdrew (WD)
White	Race cancelled (C)
Blank	Did not practice (DNP)
Blank	Did not arrive (DNA)
Blank	Excluded (EX)

Notes:

1. - Ben Winrow was docked one point at Thruxton.
2. - Carl Bradley was docked two points at Thruxton.
3. - Niki Lanik was docked two points at the second Silverstone meeting.
4. - Lea Wood was docked two points at Snetterton.
5. - Alex Dew was docked two points at the second Silverstone meeting.
6. - Stefan Hodgetts was docked three points at Oulton Park.
7. - Peter Felix was docked three points at Donington Park.
8. - Chris Rice was docked two points at Thruxton.
9. - David Shepherd was docked two points at the second Brands Hatch meeting as well as a further six point penalty.
10. - Stephen Tyldsley was docked three points at Donington Park as well as a further six point penalty.
11. - David Dickenson was docked two points at Rockingham.
12. - Chris Law was docked four points at Donington Park as well as a further fifteen point penalty.
13. - Max Hunter was docked two points at the second Brands Hatch meeting.
14. - Jonathan Shepherd was docked two points at Thruxton as well as a further four point penalty.

== Winter Cup ==
The Winter Cup was contested over two rounds at Croft on 1 November and Rockingham on 8 November. It was won by Árón Smith driving for Team Pyro.

=== Teams & Drivers ===
Team	No.	Drivers	Rounds
Total Control Racing	1	(United Kingdom) Alex MacDowall	All
Total Control Racing	9	(United Kingdom) Ray MacDowall	All
PH Motorsport	5	(United Kingdom) Phil House	All
Amery Motorsport	7	(United Kingdom) Darren Wilson	All
Amery Motorsport	50	(United Kingdom) Dave Newsham	All
Team Pyro	10	(Republic of Ireland) Árón Smith	All
Team Pyro	55	(Republic of Ireland) Quentin Smith	All
Mardi Gras Motorsport	88	(Republic of Ireland) David Dickenson	All

=== Calendar & Winners ===
Round		Venue	Date	Pole position	Fastest lap	Winning driver	Winning team
1	R1	Croft Circuit, North Yorkshire	1 November	(Republic of Ireland) Árón Smith	(United Kingdom) Phil House	(Republic of Ireland) Árón Smith	Team Pyro
1	R2	Croft Circuit, North Yorkshire	1 November	(Republic of Ireland) Árón Smith	(Republic of Ireland) Árón Smith	(Republic of Ireland) Árón Smith	Team Pyro
2	R3	Rockingham Motor Speedway, Northamptonshire	8 November	(United Kingdom) Alex MacDowall	(United Kingdom) Phil House	(United Kingdom) Phil House	PH Motorsport
2	R4	Rockingham Motor Speedway, Northamptonshire	8 November	(United Kingdom) Alex MacDowall	(Republic of Ireland) Árón Smith	(United Kingdom) Dave Newsham	Amery Motorsport

=== Drivers' Championship ===
Points were awarded on the same scale as the main championship. All scores counted.

Pos	Driver	CRO		ROC		Pts
1	(Republic of Ireland) Árón Smith	1	1	2	2	124
2	(United Kingdom) Phil House	2	3	1	8	103
3	(United Kingdom) Alex MacDowall	3	2	4	3	100
4	(Republic of Ireland) David Dickenson	4	5	5	4	84
5	(United Kingdom) Dave Newsham	5	Ret	3	1	77
6	(Republic of Ireland) Quentin Smith	6	6	7	7	68
7	(United Kingdom) Ray MacDowall	Ret	4	6	5	60
8	(United Kingdom) Darren Wilson	Ret	7	8	6	48
Pos	Driver	CRO		ROC		Pts
