= 2010 Renault Clio Cup United Kingdom =

British touring car racing season

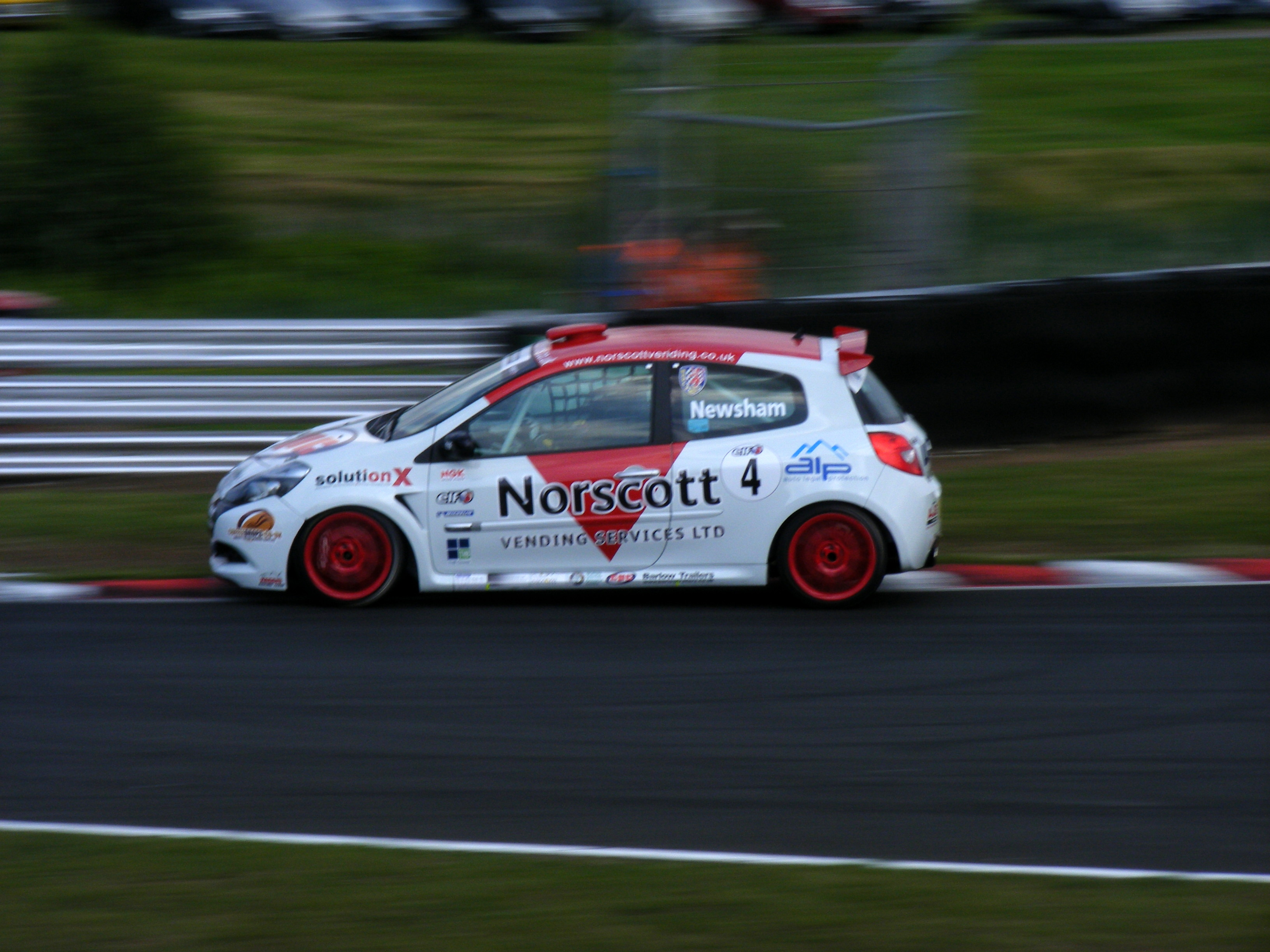
2010 champion Dave Newsham at Oulton Park.

The 2010 Elf Renault Clio Cup United Kingdom with Michelin season began at Thruxton on 4 April and will finish after 20 races over 10 events at Brands Hatch on 10 October. Fifteen drivers from seven teams will take part throughout the season, mainly supporting rounds of the British Touring Car Championship but also supporting the UK round of the World Series by Renault.

== Teams and drivers ==
Team	No.	Drivers	Class	Rounds
Team Pyro	1	(United Kingdom) Jeff Smith	M	1–7, 9
Team Pyro	4	(United Kingdom) Dave Newsham	M	1–9
Team Pyro	33	(United Kingdom) Jack Goff	G	1–5, 7, 9–10
Team Pyro	47	(United Kingdom) Jake Packun	G	6–10
Team Pyro	88	(Republic of Ireland) David Dickenson		1–3
Mardi Gras Motorsport	2	(United Kingdom) Stefan Hodgetts		9
JHR Developments	2	(United Kingdom) Tom Carnaby	G	1, 3
JHR Developments	5	(United Kingdom) Lee Pattison	M	All
JHR Developments	6	(United Kingdom) Steven Hunter	M	8
JHR Developments	23	(Ukraine) Dylan von Pontiac-Jögker		1–5
JHR Developments	23	(United Kingdom) Kane Astin	M	6
JHR Developments	55	(United Kingdom) Jason Mills	G	10
Total Control Racing	3	(United Kingdom) James Dixon	G	2, 4–10
Total Control Racing	8	(United Kingdom) Alistair Barclay	G	2–3
Total Control Racing	22	(United Kingdom) Mike Robinson		All
Total Control Racing	44	(United Kingdom) Sam Tordoff	G	1–9
Total Control Racing	77	(United Kingdom) Andy Jordan	G	10
20Ten Racing Limited	6	(United Kingdom) Graham Mulholland	M	2
20Ten Racing Limited	10	(United Kingdom) Darren Wilson	M	All
20Ten Racing Limited	41	(United Kingdom) Craig Currie		10
Westbourne Motorsport	9	(United Kingdom) James Colburn	G	All
Westbourne Motorsport	18	(United Kingdom) Patrick Collins	M	1–7, 9–10
Westbourne Motorsport	18	(United Kingdom) Ed Pead		8
Westbourne Motorsport	46	(United Kingdom) Robert Gaffney	G	1–5
Westbourne Motorsport	66	(United Kingdom) Josh Cook	G	6–7, 10
Blue Square Data; Stancombe Vehicle Engineering	15	(United Kingdom) Matthew Munson		1–4, 6–7, 9–10
Blue Square Data; Stancombe Vehicle Engineering	15	(United Kingdom) Paul Rivett		5
Blue Square Data; Stancombe Vehicle Engineering	16	(United Kingdom) Paul Rivett		7, 9–10
APO Sport	29	(United Kingdom) Alex Osborne		9
Meridian Motorsport	46	(United Kingdom) Robert Gaffney	G	9–10
Elite Motorsport	47	(United Kingdom) Jake Packun	G	1–5

Icon	Class
G	Graduate Cup
M	Masters Cup

Two classes have been introduced for the 2010 season:

- All drivers under 23 are eligible for the Graduate Cup, with the class champion earning 25% off a registration fee for the 2011 season.
- All drivers over 35 are eligible for the Masters Cup.

== Calendar ==
The series will support the British Touring Car Championship at all rounds except Donington Park on September 19, as the Clio Cup forms part of the World Series by Renault meeting on the same date, at Silverstone. In a change for this season, Saturday races are extended to 40 minutes at most circuits, while races at Rockingham, Croft and Oulton Park are 35 minutes in length.

Round		Circuit	Date	Pole position	Fastest lap	Winning driver	Winning team
1	R1	Thruxton Circuit, Hampshire	3 April	(United Kingdom) Dave Newsham	(United Kingdom) Dave Newsham	(United Kingdom) Dave Newsham	Team Pyro
1	R2	Thruxton Circuit, Hampshire	4 April	(United Kingdom) Dave Newsham	(United Kingdom) Jake Packun	(United Kingdom) Lee Pattison	JHR Developments
2	R3	Rockingham Motor Speedway, Northamptonshire	24 April	(United Kingdom) Dave Newsham	(United Kingdom) Sam Tordoff	(United Kingdom) Dave Newsham	Team Pyro
2	R4	Rockingham Motor Speedway, Northamptonshire	25 April	(United Kingdom) Dave Newsham	(United Kingdom) Lee Pattison	(United Kingdom) Dave Newsham	Team Pyro
3	R5	Brands Hatch (GP), Kent	1 May	(United Kingdom) Dave Newsham	(United Kingdom) Dave Newsham	(United Kingdom) Dave Newsham	Team Pyro
3	R6	Brands Hatch (GP), Kent	2 May	(United Kingdom) Dave Newsham	(United Kingdom) Jack Goff	(United Kingdom) Lee Pattison	JHR Developments
4	R7	Oulton Park, Cheshire	5 June	(United Kingdom) Dave Newsham	(United Kingdom) Dave Newsham	(United Kingdom) Dave Newsham	Team Pyro
4	R8	Oulton Park, Cheshire	6 June	(United Kingdom) Dave Newsham	(United Kingdom) Sam Tordoff	(United Kingdom) Dave Newsham	Team Pyro
5	R9	Croft Circuit, North Yorkshire	19 June	(United Kingdom) Dave Newsham	(United Kingdom) Paul Rivett	(United Kingdom) Dave Newsham	Team Pyro
5	R10	Croft Circuit, North Yorkshire	20 June	(United Kingdom) Dave Newsham	(United Kingdom) Dave Newsham	(United Kingdom) Dave Newsham	Team Pyro
6	R11	Snetterton Motor Racing Circuit, Norfolk	7 August	(United Kingdom) James Dixon	(United Kingdom) Sam Tordoff	(United Kingdom) Dave Newsham	Team Pyro
6	R12	Snetterton Motor Racing Circuit, Norfolk	8 August	(United Kingdom) Sam Tordoff	(United Kingdom) Sam Tordoff	(United Kingdom) Sam Tordoff	Total Control Racing
7	R13	Silverstone Circuit (National), Northamptonshire	21 August	(United Kingdom) Dave Newsham	(United Kingdom) Dave Newsham	(United Kingdom) Paul Rivett	Stancombe Vehicle Engineering
7	R14	Silverstone Circuit (National), Northamptonshire	22 August	(United Kingdom) Dave Newsham	(United Kingdom) Paul Rivett	(United Kingdom) Dave Newsham	Team Pyro
8	R15	Knockhill Racing Circuit, Fife	4 September	(United Kingdom) Dave Newsham	(United Kingdom) James Dixon	(United Kingdom) Dave Newsham	Team Pyro
8	R16	Knockhill Racing Circuit, Fife	5 September	(United Kingdom) Dave Newsham	(United Kingdom) James Colburn	(United Kingdom) Dave Newsham	Team Pyro
9	R17	Silverstone Circuit (Arena), Northamptonshire	18 September	(United Kingdom) Dave Newsham	(United Kingdom) James Dixon	(United Kingdom) Sam Tordoff	Total Control Racing
9	R18	Silverstone Circuit (Arena), Northamptonshire	19 September	(United Kingdom) Paul Rivett	(United Kingdom) Paul Rivett	(United Kingdom) Paul Rivett	Stancombe Vehicle Engineering
10	R19	Brands Hatch (Indy), Kent	9 October	(United Kingdom) James Dixon	(United Kingdom) Paul Rivett	(United Kingdom) James Dixon	Total Control Racing
10	R20	Brands Hatch (Indy), Kent	10 October	(United Kingdom) James Dixon	(United Kingdom) James Dixon	(United Kingdom) James Dixon	Total Control Racing

== Standings ==
=== Drivers' Championship ===
Pos	Driver	THR		ROC		BHGP		OUL		CRO		SNE		SIL		KNO		SIL		BHI		Total	Drop	Pen	Pts	Grad	Mast
1	(United Kingdom) Dave Newsham	1	4	1	1	1	2	1	1	1	1	1	3	2	1	1	1	3	14			529			529		475
2	(United Kingdom) Lee Pattison	6	1	4	4	9	1	5	3	6	2	4	4	4	4	2	2	2	4	6	15	449	18		431		377
3	(United Kingdom) Sam Tordoff	2	3	2	Ret	2	Ret	2	2	3	3	3	1	7	6	Ret	10	1	3			382			382	382	
4	(United Kingdom) James Colburn	4	10	5	3	3	8	7	6	10	Ret	8	5	5	3	5	6	6	6	3	8	356	11		345	306	
5	(United Kingdom) Mike Robinson	8	5	3	2	6	5	4	8	5	4	9	11	3	5	Ret	5	Ret	7	4	7	344			344		
6	(United Kingdom) James Dixon			9	9			8	9	Ret	7	2	2	14	7	4	4	Ret	2	1	1	287		2^{1}	285	285	
7	(United Kingdom) Jake Packun	3	2	7	8	Ret	DNS	3	4	8	Ret	6	7	6	Ret	6	8	Ret	8	8	9	270		3^{2}	267	267	
8	(United Kingdom) Jeff Smith	11	7	6	6	Ret	9	12	11	7	6	7	6	11	10			4	9			216		2^{3}	214		214
9	(United Kingdom) Jack Goff	9	8	8	7	Ret	6	9	10	Ret	9			9	9			Ret	5	7	4	193			193	193	
10	(United Kingdom) Paul Rivett									2	11			1	2			Ret	1	2	2	194		2^{4}	192		
11	(Ukraine) Dylan von Pontiac-Jögker	5	13	11	5	5	4	6	5	4	5											180		2^{5}	178		
12	(United Kingdom) Darren Wilson	14	14	13	14	12	13	13	13	12	10	13	12	13	12	7	9	5	13	14	13	187	14		173		151
13	(United Kingdom) Robert Gaffney	12	9	12	10	4	7	10	7	9	12							Ret	10	9	6	168			168	168	
14	(United Kingdom) Patrick Collins	13	12	17	Ret	10	11	11	Ret	11	8	10	DNS	8	13			7	11	12	11	154			154		154
15	(United Kingdom) Matthew Munson	15	15	15	13	11	12	14	12			12	10	10	11			Ret	12	10	12	131			131		
16	(United Kingdom) Josh Cook											5	8	12	8					5	3	102			102	102	
17	(United Kingdom) Tom Carnaby	7	6			7	3															75			75	75	
18	(Republic of Ireland) David Dickenson	10	11	10	Ret	8	10															57		2^{6}	55		
19	(United Kingdom) Ed Pead															3	3					50			50		
20	(United Kingdom) Jason Mills																			11	5	30			30	30	
21	(United Kingdom) Kane Astin											11	9									22			22		22
22	(United Kingdom) Alistair Barclay			16	12	Ret	14															21			21	21	
23	(United Kingdom) Craig Currie																			13	10	19			19		
24	(United Kingdom) Graham Mulholland			14	11																	17			17		17
25	(United Kingdom) Steven Hunter															Ret	7					16			16		16
26	(United Kingdom) Andy Jordan																			15	14	13			13	13	
27	(United Kingdom) Stefan Hodgetts																	Ret	Ret			0			0		
28	(United Kingdom) Alex Osborne																	Ret	Ret			0		4^{7}	−4		
Pos	Driver	THR		ROC		BHGP		OUL		CRO		SNE		SIL		KNO		SIL		BHI		Total	Drop	Pen	Pts	Grad	Mast

Colour	Result
Gold	Winner
Silver	Second place
Bronze	Third place
Green	Points classification
Blue	Non-points classification
Blue	Non-classified finish (NC)
Purple	Retired, not classified (Ret)
Red	Did not qualify (DNQ)
Red	Did not pre-qualify (DNPQ)
Black	Disqualified (DSQ)
White	Did not start (DNS)
White	Withdrew (WD)
White	Race cancelled (C)
Blank	Did not practice (DNP)
Blank	Did not arrive (DNA)
Blank	Excluded (EX)

Notes:

1. – James Dixon was penalised two points at Croft.
2. – Jake Packun was penalised three points at Silverstone Arena.
3. – Jeff Smith was penalised two points at Silverstone Arena.
4. – Paul Rivett was penalised two points at Brands Hatch Indy.
5. – Fulvio Mussi was penalised two points at Croft.
6. – David Dickenson was penalised two points at Thruxton.
7. – Alex Osborne was penalised four points at Silverstone Arena.

=== Entrants' Championship ===
Pos	Entrant	THR		ROC		BHGP		OUL		CRO		SNE		SIL		KNO		SIL		BHI		Pts
1	Team Pyro	1	4	1	1	1	2	1	1	1	1	1	3	2	1	1	1	3	5	7	4	883
1	Team Pyro	9	7	6	6	8	6	9	10	7	6	6	6	6	9	6	8	4	8	8	9	883
2	Total Control Racing	2	3	2	2	2	5	2	2	3	3	2	1	3	5	4	4	1	2	1	1	880
2	Total Control Racing	8	5	3	9	6	14	4	8	5	4	3	2	7	6	Ret	5	Ret	3	4	7	880
3	JHR Developments	5	1	4	4	5	1	5	3	4	2	4	4	4	4	2	2	2	4	6	5	710
3	JHR Developments	6	6	11	5	7	3	6	5	6	6	11	9			Ret	7			11	15	710
4	Westbourne Motorsport	4	9	5	3	3	7	7	6	9	8	5	5	5	3	3	3	6	6	3	3	678
4	Westbourne Motorsport	12	10	12	10	4	8	10	7	10	Ret	8	8	8	8	5	6	7	11	5	8	678
5	Stancombe Vehicle Engineering	15	15	15	13	11	12	14	12	2	11	12	10	1	2			Ret	1	2	2	317
5	Stancombe Vehicle Engineering													10	11			Ret	12	10	12	317
6	20Ten Racing Limited	14	14	13	11	12	13	13	13	12	10	13	12	13	12	7	9	5	13	13	10	223
6	20Ten Racing Limited			14	14															14	13	223
7	Elite Motorsport	3	2	7	8	Ret	DNS	3	4	8	Ret											144
8	Meridian Motorsport																	Ret	10	9	6	41
	APO Sport																	Ret	Ret			0
	Mardi Gras Motorsport																	Ret	Ret			0
Pos	Entrant	THR		ROC		BHGP		OUL		CRO		SNE		SIL		KNO		SIL		BHI		Pts
