= Árón Taylor-Smith =

Irish racing driver (born 1989)

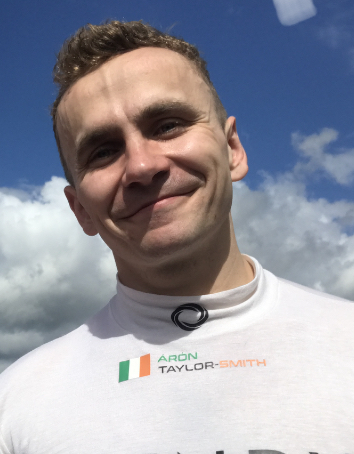
- Taylor-Smith at the 2022 British Touring Car Championship season launch at Thruxton Circuit.
- Nationality: (Republic of Ireland) Irish
- Born: Árón Smith; 9 November 1989 (age 36) Dublin, Ireland
- Relatives: Gavin Smith (brother)

BTCC career
- Debut season: 2011
- Current team: Laser Tools Racing with MB Motorsport
- Categorisation: FIA Silver
- Car number: 40
- Former teams: Power Maxed Racing; Team HARD; Triple Eight Racing; Team BKR; Team BMR; Motorbase Performance; Toyota Gazoo Racing UK with IAA
- Starts: 356 (363 entries)
- Wins: 5
- Podiums: 23
- Poles: 1
- Fastest laps: 6
- Best finish: 7th in 2024
- Finished last season: 15th

Previous series
- 2018 2007–09 2010–2017 2011: Blancpain GT Series Sprint Cup; Renault Clio Cup; Renault Clio Cup Italia; Renault Clio Cup UK

Championship titles
- 2024: BTCC Independents' Trophy

Árón Taylor-Smith (né Smith; Born 9 November 1989) is an Irish racing driver set to compete in the British Touring Car Championship for Laser Tools Racing with MB Motorsport. He is the younger brother of former VX Racing BTCC driver Gavin Smith.

== Racing career ==
=== Karting ===
Born in Dublin, Taylor-Smith began his racing career in karting in 2004 at various tracks around Ireland such as Mondello Park and Athboy, he was the 2005 JICA Irish Kart Club Champion. He followed this up by becoming the Irish Open Kart Champion in 2006.

=== Renault Clio Cup ===
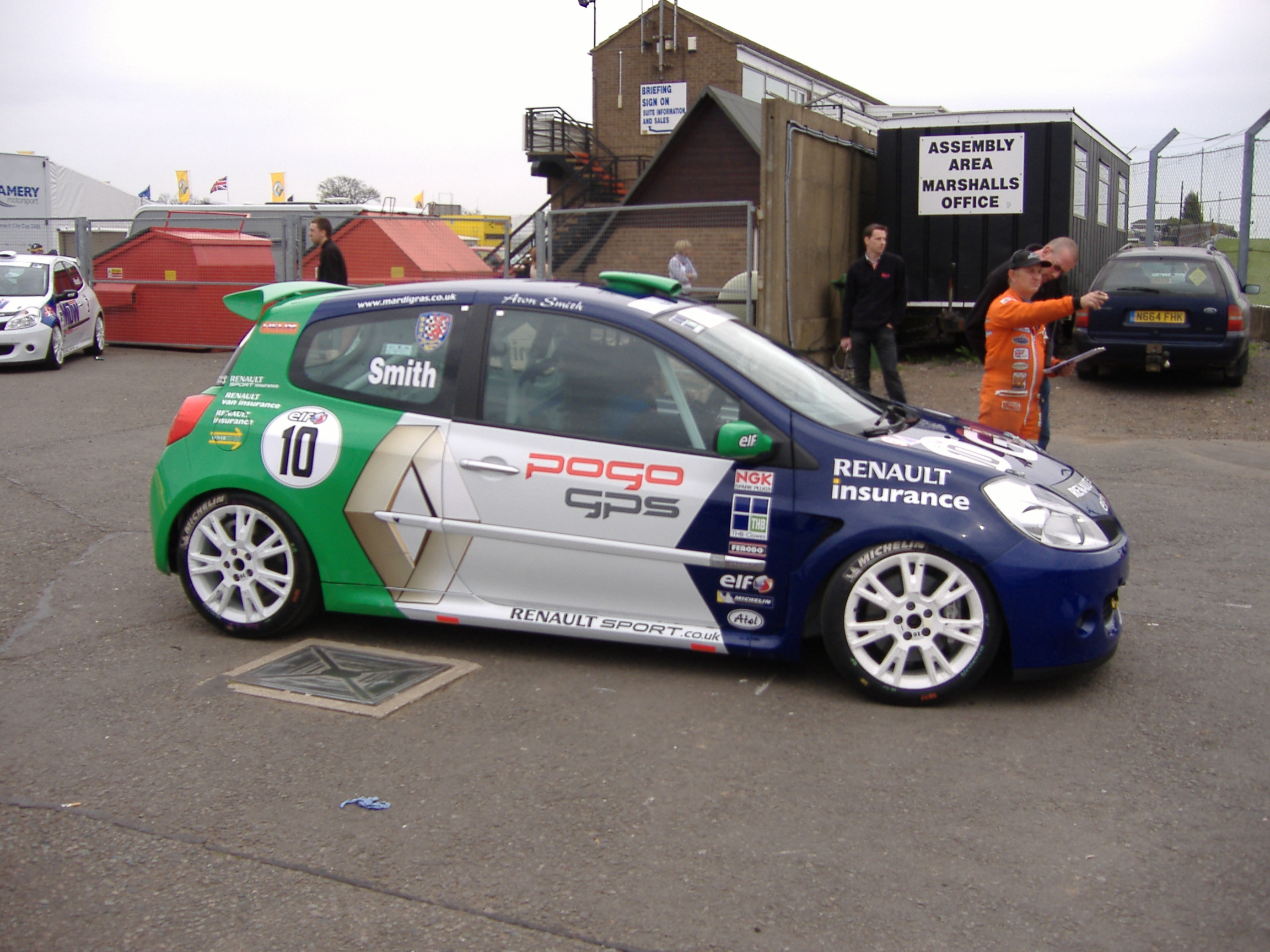
Smith in his car at Donington Park in 2008.

Taylor-Smith made the move into cars for the 2007 season by entering the Renault Clio Cup which runs on the British Touring Car Championship support package. Driving for Mardi Gras Motorsport, he finished his debut season placed 13th in the championship with a best result of fourth at Thruxton.

Taylor-Smith stayed with the team for 2008 finishing ninth. He also contested the 2008 Renault Clio Winter Cup with Team Pyro where he took his first Clio Cup pole position in the first race at Croft, followed by his first win in the same race. He won the four-race championship ahead of Phil House and future BTCC and WTCC driver Alex MacDowall. He raced with Team Pyro for the 2009 season. Once again he improved, finishing fourth in the championship having achieved three podiums including a win.

Taylor-Smith switched to the Clio Cup Italia for 2010, finishing the season fourth overall with two wins and two pole positions. 2011 saw Taylor-Smith return to the UK championship with Team Pyro. He finished joint second to Paul Rivett in the championship after a close title decider at Brands Hatch.

=== British Touring Car Championship ===
==== Triple 8 Race Engineering (2011) ====
Taylor-Smith made his BTCC debut for Triple 8 Race Engineering at the Knockhill round of the 2011 British Touring Car Championship. He picked up a single point on his debut after finishing in tenth place. This was to be a one-off appearance as the Renault Clio Cup rejoined the TOCA package at Rockingham.

==== Motorbase Performance (2012–2013) ====
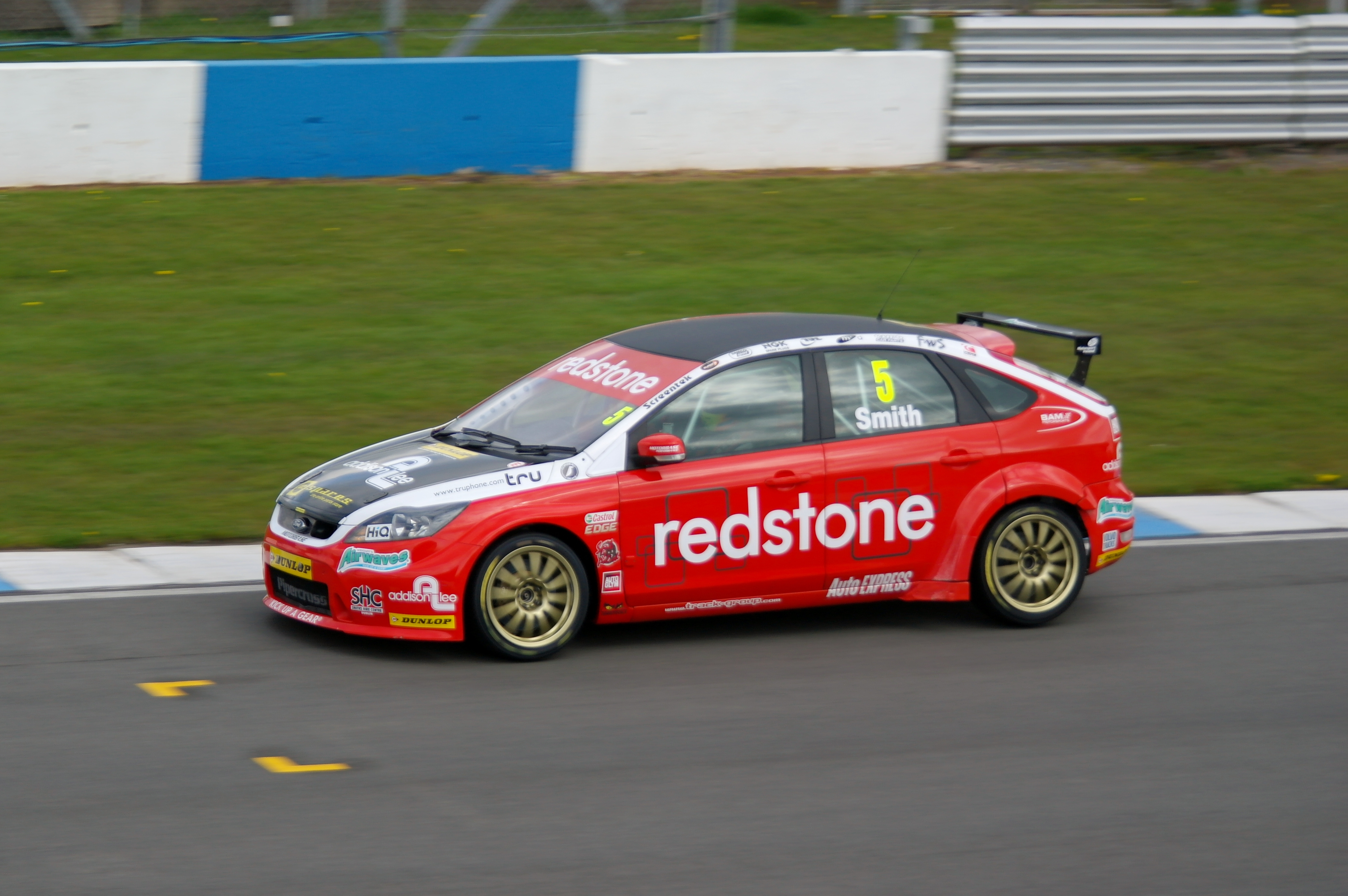
Taylor-Smith driving for Redstone Racing at Donington Park in the 2012 British Touring Car Championship.

In 2012, Taylor-Smith raced for Redstone Racing in one of their NGTC engined Ford Focus STs. His teammates were Mat Jackson and Liam Griffin. In the season opening race at Brands Hatch, the bumper of his car was memorably pulled off by a recovery vehicle as it was towed out of a gravel trap. In June 2012, he demonstrated his Ford Focus ST BTCC car on the streets of Dublin during the Bavaria City Racing Festival in front of an estimated 110,000 fans. He came close to a podium finish at Knockhill, and led at Rockingham until a safety car allowed his rivals to catch him. Taylor-Smith finally took his first podium finish at Silverstone by finishing third in the first race. He took his first win at the final event of the year at Brands Hatch, crossing the line ahead of champion Gordon Shedden in race two. He finished the year placed eighth in the final championship standings.

Taylor-Smith stayed with Motorbase for 2013, now driving a full NGTC specification Ford Focus ST as raced by Jackson in the second half of the 2012 season. He led Jackson in the standings for much of the season but ended the year ninth, one place behind Jackson. Neither driver won a race, however they both achieved several podiums.

==== Team BMR (2014–2015) ====
Taylor-Smith moved to Team BMR for the 2014 British Touring Car Championship, driving a Volkswagen CC alongside former champion Alain Menu. Taylor-Smith took two wins, one at Oulton Park and the other at Snetterton, and finished ninth in the final drivers' championship standings. Taylor-Smith remained with Team BMR for 2015, where he was joined by former champions, Colin Turkington and Jason Plato. He finished the year 11th overall, claiming six podiums.

==== Team BKR (2016) ====
Taylor-Smith moved to the newly formed Team BKR for the 2016 season. He started the year strongly with podiums at both Brands Hatch and Donington Park. A win would come his way at Rockingham and he finished the year 14th overall.

==== MG RCIB Triple Eight Racing (2017) ====
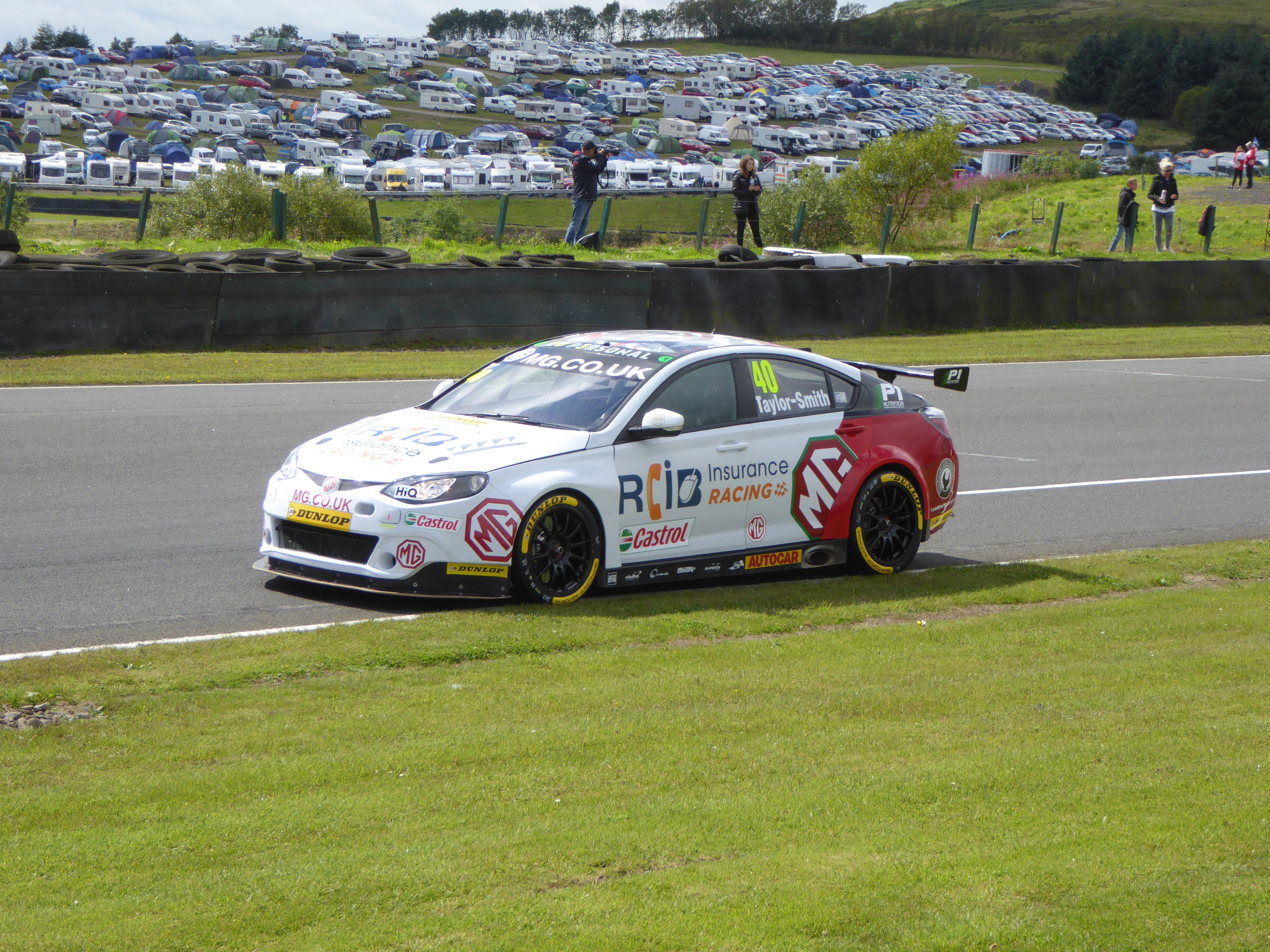
Taylor-Smith, at the Knockhill round of the 2017 British Touring Car Championship.

Taylor-Smith moved once again this season, this time to Triple Eight Racing for the 2017 British Touring Car Championship season. He was the lead driver of the two car entry paired with Daniel Lloyd and was lucky to escape without serious injury from an accident at Croft that also involved Jeff Smith and Luke Davenport.

==== Team HARD (2021–) ====
Having spent a year outside racing due to the COVID-19 pandemic in 2020, Taylor-Smith returned to the BTCC in 2021 as part of the four-car Team HARD programme driving a new Cupra Leon.

== British GT Championship ==
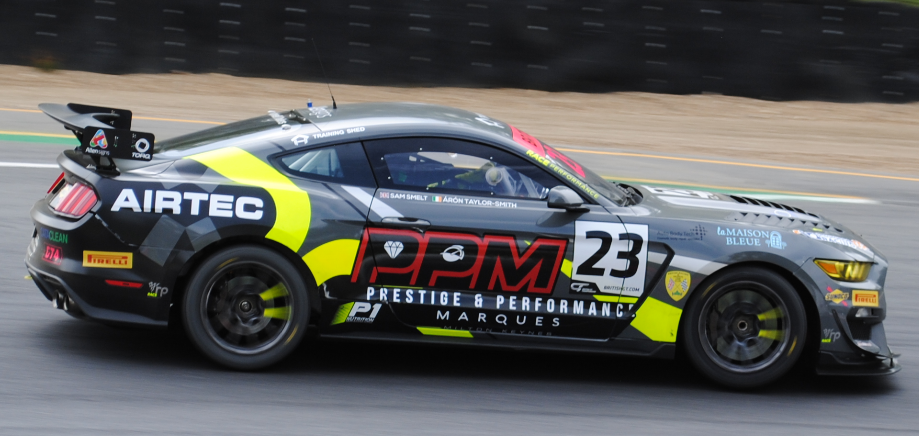
Taylor-Smith's car at Brands Hatch.

Taylor-Smith drove with ex-BTCC driver Sam Smelt in a Ford Mustang GT4 in 2019. They finished 22nd in the championship with only four points, scored at Snetterton.

== Racing record ==
=== Complete British Touring Car Championship results ===
(key) (Races in bold indicate pole position – 1 point awarded in first race; races in italics indicate fastest lap – 1 point awarded all races; * signifies that driver lead race for at least one lap – 1 point awarded all races; ^{Superscript} number indicates points-scoring qualifying race position)

Year	Team	Car	1	2	3	4	5	6	7	8	9	10	11	12	13	14	15	16	17	18	19	20	21	22	23	24	25	26	27	28	29	30	DC	Points
2011	Triple 8 Race Engineering	Vauxhall Vectra	BRH; 1	BRH; 2	BRH; 3	DON; 1	DON; 2	DON; 3	THR; 1	THR; 2	THR; 3	OUL; 1	OUL; 2	OUL; 3	CRO; 1	CRO; 2	CRO; 3	SNE; 1	SNE; 2	SNE; 3	KNO; 1; 10	KNO; 2; 13	KNO; 3 Ret	ROC; 1	ROC; 2	ROC; 3	BRH; 1	BRH; 2	BRH; 3	SIL; 1	SIL; 2	SIL; 3	24th	1
2012	Redstone Racing	Ford Focus ST Mk. II	BRH; 1 Ret	BRH; 2 Ret	BRH; 3; 8	DON; 1; 8	DON; 2; 9	DON; 3; 11	THR; 1; 7	THR; 2; 8	THR; 3; 15	OUL; 1 Ret	OUL; 2; 16	OUL; 3 Ret	CRO; 1; 10	CRO; 2 Ret	CRO; 3 Ret	SNE; 1; 14	SNE; 2; 10	SNE; 3; 6	KNO; 1; 4	KNO; 2; 6	KNO; 3; 8	ROC; 1 Ret	ROC; 2; 6	ROC; 3; 5*	SIL; 1; 3	SIL; 2; 4	SIL; 3; 9	BRH; 1; 4	BRH; 2; 1*	BRH; 3; 5	8th	204
2013	Airwaves Racing	Ford Focus ST Mk. III	BRH; 1; 9	BRH; 2 Ret	BRH; 3; 11	DON; 1; 11	DON; 2; 8	DON; 3; 7	THR; 1; 9	THR; 2; 10	THR; 3; 5	OUL; 1 Ret	OUL; 2; 14	OUL; 3; 10	CRO; 1; 14	CRO; 2; 12	CRO; 3; 9	SNE; 1; 6	SNE; 2; 3	SNE; 3; 3	KNO; 1; 10	KNO; 2 Ret	KNO; 3; 15	ROC; 1; 13	ROC; 2; 15	ROC; 3; 14	SIL; 1; 8	SIL; 2; 3	SIL; 3; 2	BRH; 1; 10	BRH; 2; 5	BRH; 3; 5	9th	201
2014	CHROME Edition Restart Racing	Volkswagen CC	BRH; 1; 7	BRH; 2; 13	BRH; 3 Ret	DON; 1; 9	DON; 2; 8	DON; 3; 11	THR; 1; 22	THR; 2; 14	THR; 3; 7	OUL; 1; 12	OUL; 2; 8	**OUL**; **3**; 1*	CRO; 1; 23	CRO; 2; 14	CRO; 3; 9	SNE; 1; 6	SNE; 2; 8	**SNE**; **3**; 1*	KNO; 1; 8	KNO; 2 Ret	KNO; 3 Ret	ROC; 1; 20	ROC; 2; 17	ROC; 3; 12	SIL; 1; 6	SIL; 2; 5	SIL; 3; 2	BRH; 1; 11	BRH; 2; 7	BRH; 3; 5	9th	201
2015	Team BMR RCIB Insurance	Volkswagen CC	BRH; 1; 2	BRH; 2; 12	BRH; 3; 3	DON; 1 DNS	DON; 2; 12	DON; 3; 6	**THR**; **1**; 21	THR; 2; 11	THR; 3; 8	OUL; 1; 5	OUL; 2; 7	OUL; 3; 7	CRO; 1; 12	CRO; 2; 16	CRO; 3; 12	SNE; 1; 2	SNE; 2 Ret	SNE; 3; 12	KNO; 1; 25	KNO; 2 DNS	KNO; 3; 17	ROC; 1; 3	ROC; 2; 11	ROC; 3; 6	SIL; 1; 6	SIL; 2; 3	SIL; 3; 24	BRH; 1; 2	BRH; 2; 8	BRH; 3; 9	11th	209
2016	Team BKR	Volkswagen CC	BRH; 1; 7	BRH; 2; 3	BRH; 3; 8	DON; 1; 8	DON; 2; 3	DON; 3; 15	THR; 1; 20	THR; 2; 18	THR; 3 Ret	OUL; 1; 8	OUL; 2; 17	OUL; 3; 11	CRO; 1; 10	CRO; 2; 11	CRO; 3; 8	SNE; 1 Ret	SNE; 2 Ret	SNE; 3; 17	KNO; 1 NC	KNO; 2 Ret	KNO; 3; 18	ROC; 1; 15	ROC; 2; 7	**ROC**; **3**; 1*	SIL; 1; 6	SIL; 2; 24	SIL; 3 Ret	BRH; 1 Ret	BRH; 2; 14	BRH; 3; 20	15th	132
2017	MG RCIB Insurance Racing	MG 6 GT	BRH; 1; 14	BRH; 2; 15	BRH; 3; 12	DON; 1; 23	DON; 2; 18	DON; 3; 9	THR; 1; 20	THR; 2; 27	THR; 3; 25	OUL; 1; 16	OUL; 2; 12	OUL; 3; 25	CRO; 1 WD	CRO; 2 WD	CRO; 3 WD	SNE; 1 Ret	SNE; 2; 27	SNE; 3 Ret	KNO; 1; 15	KNO; 2 Ret	KNO; 3; 24	ROC; 1; 16	ROC; 2; 15	ROC; 3; 20	SIL; 1; 19	SIL; 2; 14	SIL; 3; 17	BRH; 1; 23	BRH; 2; 13	BRH; 3; 20	27th	25
2021	Team HARD with HUB Financial Solutions	Cupra León	THR; 1; 18	THR; 2; 15	THR; 3; 11	SNE; 1; 22	SNE; 2; 18	SNE; 3; 14	BRH; 1; 18	BRH; 2; 15	BRH; 3; 17	OUL; 1; 16	OUL; 2; 16	OUL; 3; 15	KNO; 1; 25	KNO; 2; 15	KNO; 3; 12	THR; 1; 27	THR; 2 Ret	THR; 3; 23	CRO; 1; 14	CRO; 2; 22	CRO; 3; 12	SIL; 1; 17	SIL; 2; 12	SIL; 3; 14	DON; 1; 18	DON; 2; 17	DON; 3; 12	BRH; 1; 27	BRH; 2; 20	BRH; 3; 14	20th	33
2022	Yazoo with Safuu.com Racing	Cupra León	DON; 1; 13	DON; 2; 11	DON; 3; 11	BRH; 1; 21	BRH; 2; 16	BRH; 3; 16	THR; 1; 18	THR; 2; 19	THR; 3; 13	OUL; 1; 16	OUL; 2; 15	OUL; 3; 10	CRO; 1 Ret	CRO; 2; 21	CRO; 3 Ret	KNO; 1; 16	KNO; 2; 16	KNO; 3; 14	SNE; 1; 17	SNE; 2; 16	SNE; 3; 22	THR; 1; 19	THR; 2; 25	THR; 3; 18	SIL; 1; 15	SIL; 2; 10	SIL; 3; 10	BRH; 1 Ret	BRH; 2 Ret	BRH; 3; 20	21st	38
2023	CarStore Power Maxed Racing	Vauxhall Astra	DON; 1; 10	DON; 2; 20	DON; 3; 9	BRH; 1; 12	BRH; 2 Ret	BRH; 3 DNS	SNE; 1; 10	SNE; 2; 12	SNE; 3 Ret	THR; 1; 9	THR; 2; 8	THR; 3; 6	OUL; 1 Ret	OUL; 2; 19	OUL; 3 Ret	CRO; 1; 10	CRO; 2; 12	CRO; 3; 9	KNO; 1; 7	KNO; 2; 4	KNO; 3; 15	DON; 1; 6	DON; 2; 10	DON; 3; 2	SIL; 1; 7	SIL; 2; 2*	SIL; 3; 9	BRH; 1; 11	BRH; 2 Ret	BRH; 3; 21	11th	165
2024	Evans Halshaw Power Maxed Racing	Vauxhall Astra	DON; 1; 7	DON; 2; 11	DON; 3; 14	BRH; 1; 10	BRH; 2; 10	BRH; 3; 4	SNE; 1; 12	SNE; 2; 12	SNE; 3; 15	THR; 1; 10	THR; 2; 9	THR; 3; 8	OUL; 1; 7	OUL; 2; 5	OUL; 3; 3	CRO; 1; 5	CRO; 2; 7	CRO; 3; 13	KNO; 1; 4	KNO; 2; 11	KNO; 3; 12	DON; 1; 9	DON; 2; 8	DON; 3; 3	SIL; 1; 12	SIL; 2; 9	SIL; 3; 9	BRH; 1; 6	BRH; 2; 6	BRH; 3; 12	7th	224
2025	Toyota Gazoo Racing UK with IAA	Toyota Corolla GR Sport	DON; 1 Ret	DON; 2 Ret	DON; 3; 12	BRH; 1; 16	BRH; 2; 15	BRH; 3; 15	SNE; 1; 14	SNE; 2; 12	SNE; 3; 11	THR; 1; 12	THR; 2; 17	THR; 3; 6	OUL; 1; 13	OUL; 2 Ret	OUL; 3 DNS	CRO; 1; 7	CRO; 2; 21	CRO; 3; 9	KNO; 1; 9	KNO; 2; 11	KNO; 3 Ret	DON; 1; 10	DON; 2; 7	DON; 3; 4	SIL; 1; 11	SIL; 2; 4	SIL; 3; 11	BRH; 1; 12	BRH; 2 Ret	BRH; 3 Ret	17th	103
2026	Laser Tools Racing with MB Motorsport	Toyota Corolla GR Sport	DON; 1; 8^{11}	DON; 2; 11	DON; 3; 12	BRH; 1; 13^{9}	BRH; 2; 1*	BRH; 3; 9	SNE; 1; 19	SNE; 2; 14	SNE; 3; 12	OUL; 1; 4^{5}	OUL; 2; 18	OUL; 3 Ret	THR; 1; 10^{11}	THR; 2; 9	THR; 3 Ret	KNO; 1; 12^{14}	KNO; 2; 13	KNO; 3; 17	DON; 1; 6^{7}	DON; 2; 7	DON; 3; 4	CRO; 1; 16^{15}	CRO; 2; 16	CRO; 3 Ret	SIL; 1; 9^{9}	SIL; 2; 7	SIL; 3; 8	BRH; 1 Ret^{8}	BRH; 2; 18	BRH; 3 Ret	15th	174

=== Complete Blancpain GT Series Sprint Cup results ===
Year	Team	Car	Class	1	2	3	4	5	6	7	8	9	10	Pos.	Points
2018	Team Parker Racing	Bentley Continental GT3	Silver	ZOL; 1; 18	ZOL; 2; 16	BRH; 1; 15	BRH; 2 Ret	MIS; 1; 15	MIS; 2 Ret	HUN; 1	HUN; 2	NÜR; 1	NÜR; 2	9th	33

=== Complete British GT Championship results ===
(key) (Races in bold indicate pole position) (Races in italics indicate fastest lap)

Year	Team	Car	Class	1	2	3	4	5	6	7	8	9	DC	Points
2019	RACE Performance	Ford Mustang GT4	GT4	OUL; 1; 25	OUL; 2; 28	SNE; 1; 25	SNE; 2; 21	SIL; 1 Ret	DON; 1; 30	SPA; 1; 29	BRH; 1; 26	DON; 1 Ret	22nd	4

Sporting positions
Preceded by Josh Cook	British Touring Car Championship; Independents' Trophy Winner; 2024	Succeeded by Dan Lloyd
