= Chris James (racing driver) =

British racing driver (born 1978)

- Nationality: British
- Born: 28 December 1978 (age 47) Luton, Bedfordshire

Previous series
- 2011–12 2008–10 2000–05: BTCC; Mini Challenge; Fiat Racing Challenge

Christopher Nigel James (born 28 December 1978 in Luton, Bedfordshire) is a British racing driver.

== Racing career ==
James competed in the Fiat Racing challenge between 2000 and 2005 at the wheel of a Fiat Punto, taking several wins. He returned to racing in 2008, driving in selected rounds of the Mini Challenge. After half a season in 2009, he contested a full campaign in 2010 with one race win & finished third in class.

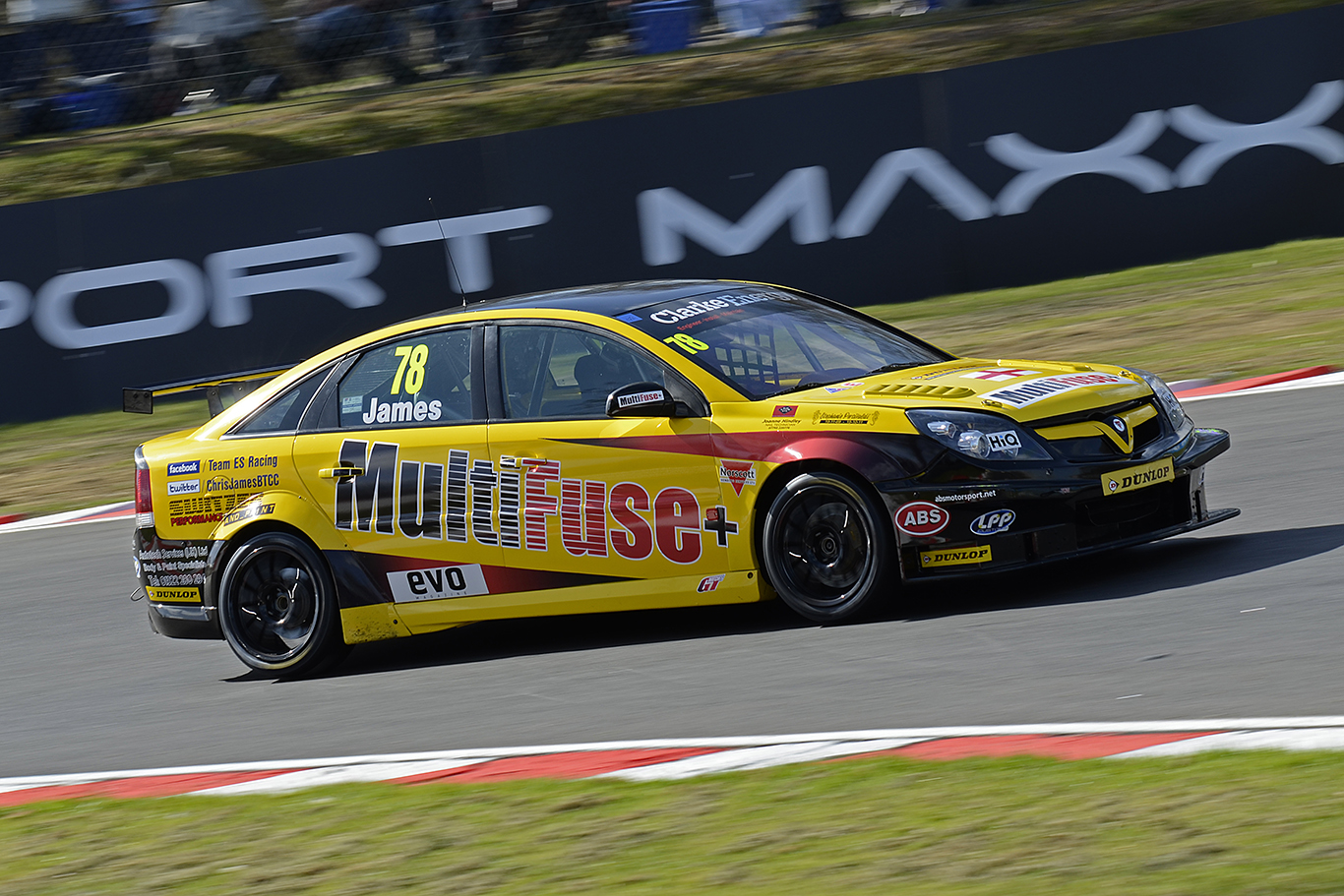
James driving the Team ES Racing Vauxhall Vectra at Brands Hatch during the 2012 British Touring Car Championship season.

In 2011, James competed in the British Touring Car Championship. He drove a Chevrolet Lacetti for his own ES Racing team, his best finish throughout the season was a twelfth place at Donington.

In 2012, Team ES Racing.com acquired two ex-Triple Eight Vauxhall Vectra for himself and Dave Newsham. Newsham would take two wins over the course of the season, whereas James' best finishes came at Brands Hatch and Silverstone where he finished in 12th place.

Since 2014, James has raced sporadically in the Mini Challenge - taking a single podium in 2014.

James competed in the Dubai 24 hour race in 2016, co-driving with Rebecca Jackson.

== Complete British Touring Car Championship results ==
(key) (Races in bold indicate pole position – 1 point awarded in first race) (Races in italics indicate fastest lap – 1 point awarded all races) (* signifies that driver lead race for at least one lap – 1 point given all races)

Year	Team	Car	1	2	3	4	5	6	7	8	9	10	11	12	13	14	15	16	17	18	19	20	21	22	23	24	25	26	27	28	29	30	Pos	Pts
2011	Team ES Racing	Chevrolet Lacetti	BRH; 1; 15	BRH; 2; 17	BRH; 3; 19	DON; 1; 17	DON; 2; 14	DON; 3; 12	THR; 1; 18	THR; 2 Ret	THR; 3; 18	OUL; 1 Ret	OUL; 2 Ret	OUL; 3 DNS	CRO; 1 Ret	CRO; 2 Ret	CRO; 3; 18	SNE; 1; 20	SNE; 2 DNS	SNE; 3 Ret	KNO; 1; 18	KNO; 2; 17	KNO; 3; 17	ROC; 1; 18	ROC; 2; 17	ROC; 3; 23	BRH; 1; 20	BRH; 2; 25	BRH; 3; 18	SIL; 1; 21	SIL; 2; 22	SIL; 3; 24	28th	0
2012	Team ES Racing.com	Vauxhall Vectra	BRH; 1; 15	BRH; 2 Ret	BRH; 3; 12	DON; 1; 17	DON; 2 Ret	DON; 3; 13	THR; 1; 15	THR; 2 Ret	THR; 3; 17	OUL; 1 Ret	OUL; 2; 13	OUL; 3; 13	CRO; 1; 16	CRO; 2; 16	CRO; 3; 17	SNE; 1 Ret	SNE; 2 Ret	SNE; 3 Ret	KNO; 1; 13	KNO; 2 Ret	KNO; 3; 16	ROC; 1; 13	ROC; 2; 18	ROC; 3 Ret	SIL; 1 Ret	SIL; 2; 15	SIL; 3; 12	BRH; 1; 18	BRH; 2; 16	BRH; 3; 18	23rd	26
