= Jason Mills =

New Zealand cricketer (born 1969)

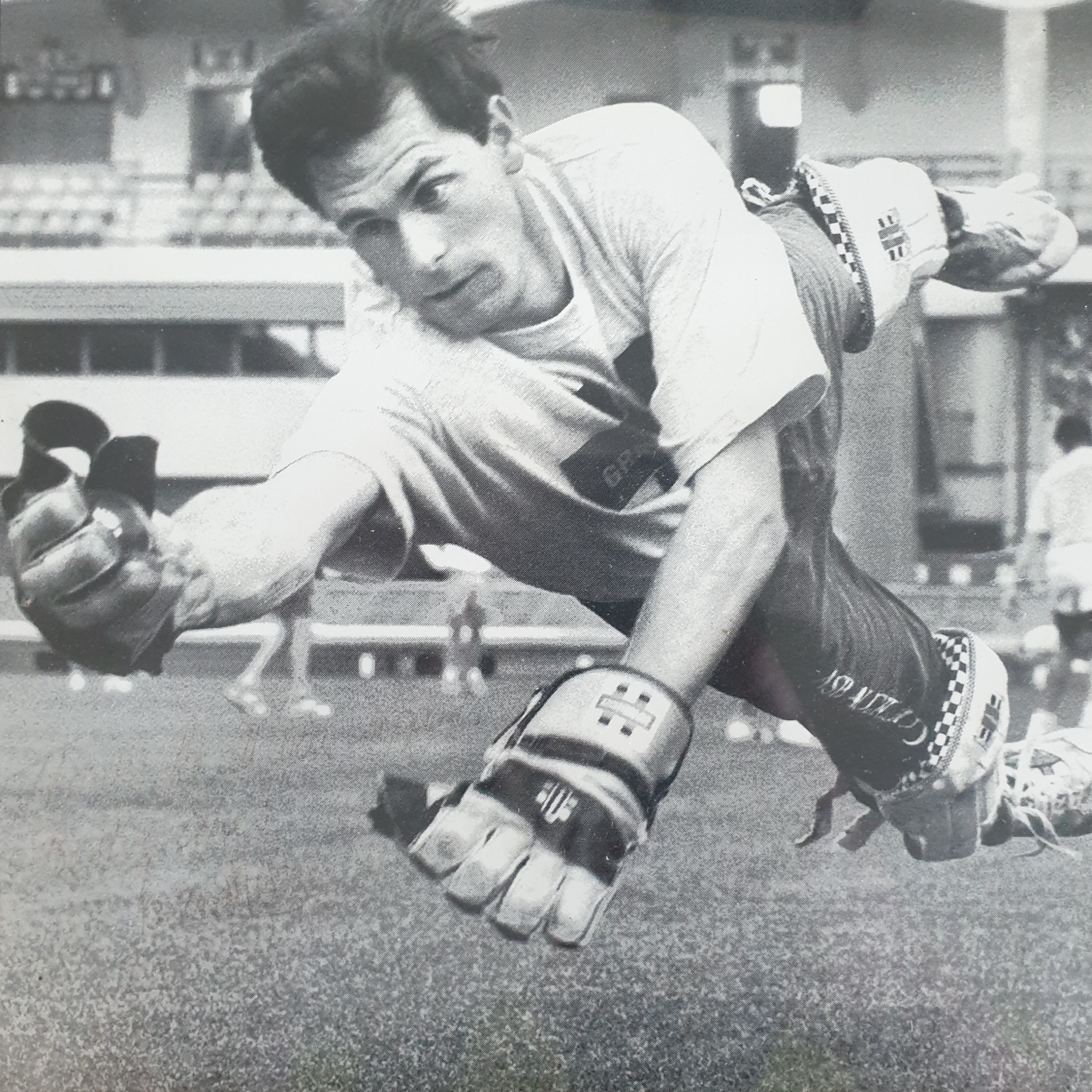

Personal information
- Full name: Jason Martin Mills
- Born: 12 August 1969 (age 57); Auckland, New Zealand
- Source: ESPNcricinfo, 18 June 2016

Jason Mills (born 12 August 1969) is a New Zealand former cricketer. He played 27 first-class and 30 List A matches for Auckland between 1991 and 1999.

== See also ==
- List of Auckland representative cricketers
