= Dave Newsham =

British racing driver (born 1967)

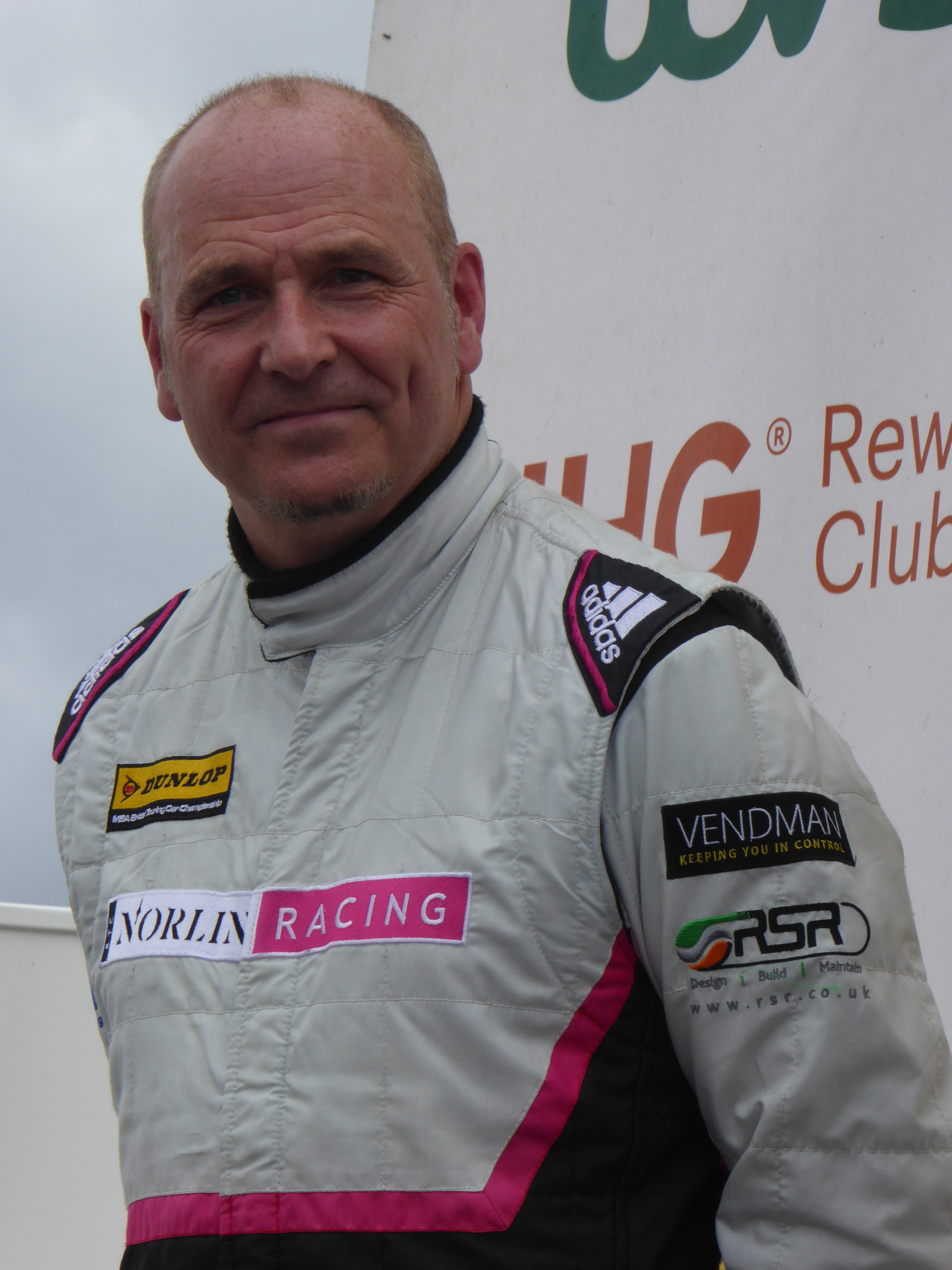
- Newsham at the Knockhill round of the 2017 British Touring Car Championship.
- Nationality: (United Kingdom) British
- Born: David Robert Newsham; 7 July 1967 (age 59) Carmarthen (Wales)

British Touring Car Championship career
- Debut season: 2011
- Current team: BTC Norlin Racing
- Car number: 17
- Former teams: Power Maxed Racing; AmD Tuning.com; Speedworks Motorsport; Team ES Racing; Geoff Steel Racing; Special Tuning Racing
- Starts: 180
- Wins: 2
- Poles: 1
- Fastest laps: 2
- Best finish: 9th in 2012

Previous series
- 2008–10 2010: Renault Clio Cup UK; Ginetta G50 Cup

Championship titles
- 2014 2010: Jack Sears Trophy; Renault Clio Cup UK

David Robert Newsham (born 7 July 1967) is a British racing driver and businessman. He is the managing director of Norscott Vending. He raced in the British Touring Car Championship from 2011 to 2017, but in 2016, he competed in the British Rallycross Championship, only entering two rounds of the BTCC in place of Kelvin Fletcher.

Newsham announced his retirement from the BTCC on 9 January 2018.

== Racing career ==
=== Renault Clio Cup UK ===
Born in Carmarthen, Newsham joined the TOCA tour in 2008, competing in the final two rounds of the Renault Clio Cup UK. This led to a full season in 2009, driving for Amery Motorsport. He scored one race win at Silverstone and finished fifth on points at the end of the season. In 2010, he switched to Team Pyro and dominated the series, winning the championship title with twelve race wins.

=== British Touring Car Championship ===
==== Geoff Steel Racing and STR (2011) ====
In 2011, Newsham stepped up to the British Touring Car Championship. Newsham started the season driving for Geoff Steel Racing, with a Super 2000 BMW 320si. He scored a point in his first race at Brands Hatch, but a disappointing weekend at Donington Park which included two retirements prompted him to leave the team.

After leaving Geoff Steel Racing, Newsham drove a NGTC SEAT León for Special Tuning Racing. In his first race for the team at Oulton Park, he set the fastest lap and scored points in race three. He started on pole position for the reversed grid race at Snetterton but fell down the order to eighth at the end after taking wheel damage. He finished the season 15th in the Drivers Championship, four places down on his teammate despite having missed the round at Thruxton.

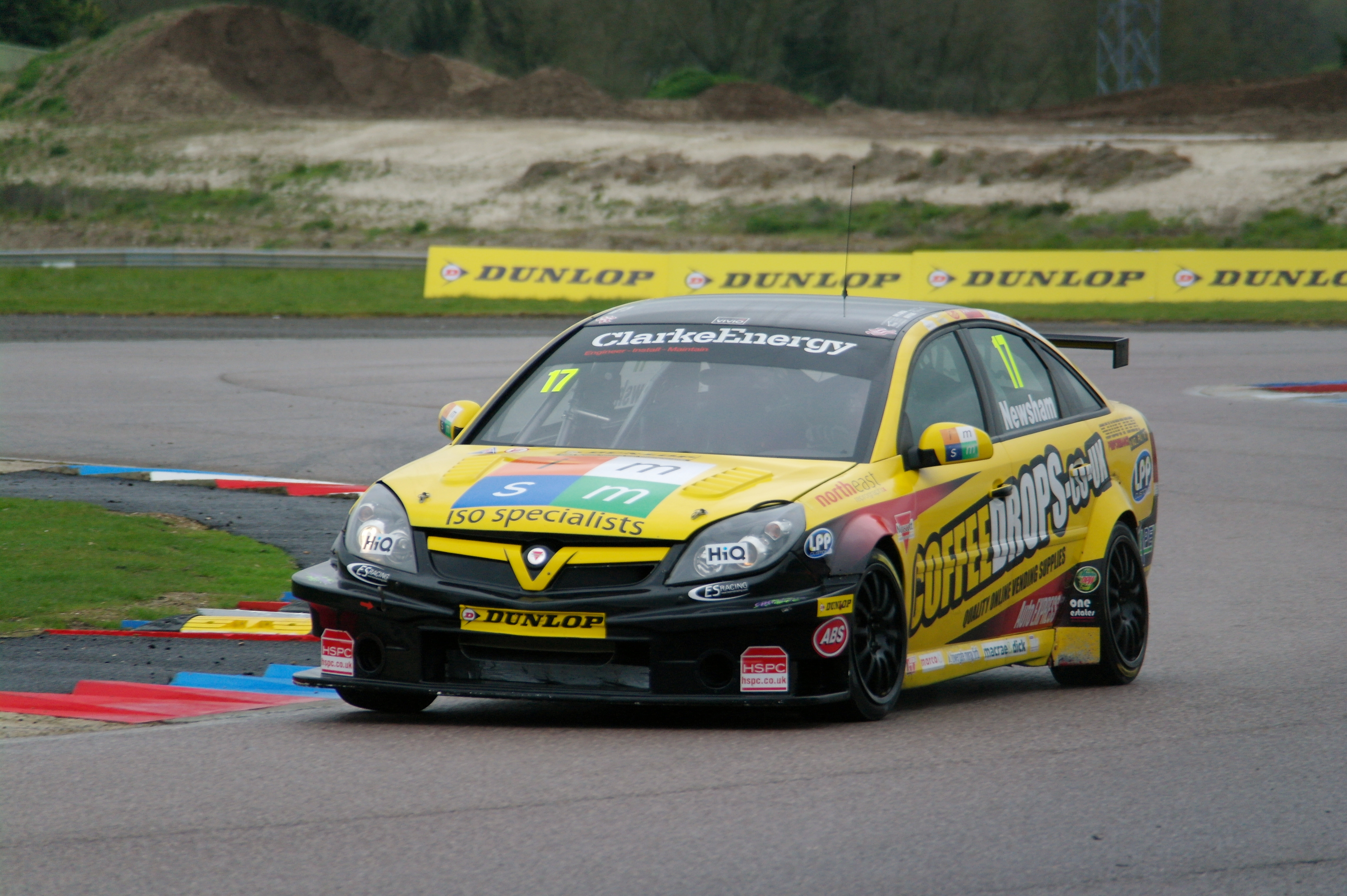
Newsham driving for Team ES Racing at Thruxton in the 2012 BTCC season.

==== Team ES Racing (2012) ====
In 2012, Newsham switched to an ex-Triple Eight Race Engineering S2000 spec Vauxhall Vectra run by Team ES Racing. He achieved his first pole position at Brands Hatch at the start of the season, setting his time during the middle of the session and stayed at the top of the timesheet. He was in contention for the win in race 1 until Jason Plato made contact with him and he retired. He took a third place podium finish in the final race of the day. He scored his second best result of the season at Thruxton when he finished second in the first race. Newsham won his first BTCC race in the third race at Snetterton, and added to his race wins with a lights to flag victory in the third race at Knockhill, his 'local' circuit. He secured his sixth podium of the season at Silverstone in the second race, having already finished second in the first race of the day. Newsham finished the season ninth in the drivers' standings and sixth in the Independents' Trophy. To crown a first full competitive season in the BTCC, Newsham received the official BTCC fans' Driver of the Year award.

==== Speedworks Motorsport (2013) ====
Newsham tested for Speedworks Motorsport at Donington Park on 29 November 2012. On 20 December, it was confirmed that he would join the team for the 2013 season. He finished 10th in the standings.

==== AmD (2014) ====
Newsham signed up with AmD and drove their NGTC Ford Focus for the 2014 campaign, finishing 17th overall with a best result of second.

==== Power Maxed Racing (2015–2016) ====
Newsham signed for Power Maxed Racing in 2015 and drove their Chevrolet Cruze. He achieved a pair of fourth-place finishes during the year and finished 16th in the championship standings.

Unable to secure the budget for Touring Cars in 2016, Newsham ventured into the British Rallycross Championship, again driving for Power Maxed Racing. Halfway through the season, he was recalled to their Touring Car programme for two rounds only to fill in for Kelvin Fletcher. He managed a seventh place at his home race at Knockhill and ninth at Rockingham. He placed 22nd in the standings.

==== BTC Norlin Racing (2017) ====
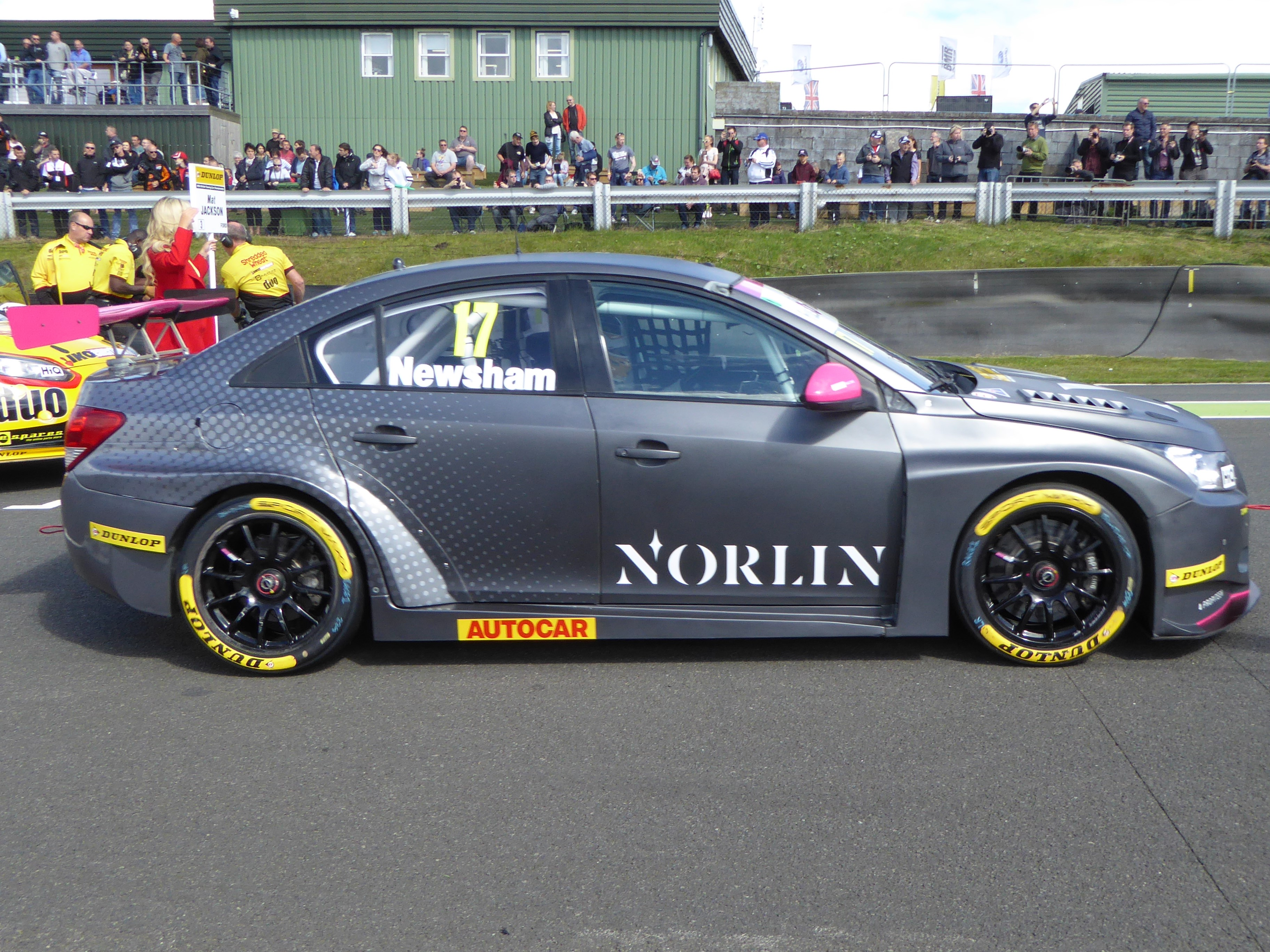
Newsham, at the Knockhill round of the 2017 British Touring Car Championship.

Newsham signed for BTC Norlin Racing in 2017, again driving the Chevrolet Cruze. He placed 14th in the standings.

== Racing record ==
=== Complete British Touring Car Championship results ===
(key) (Races in bold indicate pole position – 1 point awarded in first race) (Races in italics indicate fastest lap – 1 point awarded all races) (* signifies that driver lead race for at least one lap – 1 point given all races)

Year	Team	Car	1	2	3	4	5	6	7	8	9	10	11	12	13	14	15	16	17	18	19	20	21	22	23	24	25	26	27	28	29	30	Pos	Pts
2011	Geoff Steel Racing	BMW 320si	BRH; 1; 10	BRH; 2; 11	BRH; 3; 11	DON; 1 Ret	DON; 2; 15	DON; 3 Ret	THR; 1	THR; 2	THR; 3																						15th	31
2011	Special Tuning Racing	SEAT León										OUL; 1; 12	OUL; 2; 17	OUL; 3; 8	CRO; 1; 19	CRO; 2; 8	CRO; 3; 10	SNE; 1; 10	SNE; 2; 7	**SNE**; **3**; 8*	KNO; 1; 15	KNO; 2; 12	KNO; 3; 11	ROC; 1 Ret	ROC; 2 Ret	ROC; 3; 15	BRH; 1 Ret	BRH; 2; 17	BRH; 3; 11	SIL; 1; 6	SIL; 2; 4	SIL; 3 Ret	15th	31
2012	Team ES Racing.com	Vauxhall Vectra	**BRH**; **1** Ret*	BRH; 2; 9	BRH; 3; 3	DON; 1; 7	DON; 2; 4	DON; 3 Ret*	THR; 1; 2	THR; 2; 6	THR; 3; 18	OUL; 1 Ret	OUL; 2; 10	OUL; 3 Ret	CRO; 1 Ret	CRO; 2; 12	CRO; 3; 16	SNE; 1 DSQ	SNE; 2; 8	SNE; 3; 1*	KNO; 1; 11	KNO; 2; 10	**KNO**; **3**; 1*	ROC; 1; 12	ROC; 2; 15	ROC; 3 Ret	SIL; 1; 2	SIL; 2; 3	SIL; 3 Ret	BRH; 1; 7	BRH; 2 Ret	BRH; 3; 6	9th	202
2013	Speedworks Motorsport	Toyota Avensis	BRH; 1 Ret	BRH; 2; 9	BRH; 3 Ret	DON; 1; 9	DON; 2; 7	DON; 3 Ret	THR; 1; 8	THR; 2; 12	THR; 3; 9	OUL; 1; 8	OUL; 2; 6	OUL; 3; 14	CRO; 1 Ret	CRO; 2; 9	CRO; 3; 5	SNE; 1; 18	SNE; 2; 8	**SNE**; **3** Ret	KNO; 1; 11	KNO; 2; 10	KNO; 3 Ret	ROC; 1; 8	ROC; 2; 7	ROC; 3; 8	SIL; 1; 10	SIL; 2; 8	SIL; 3; 6	BRH; 1; 11	BRH; 2; 4	BRH; 3; 6	10th	176
2014	AmD Tuning.com	Ford Focus ST Mk.III	BRH; 1; 17	BRH; 2; 16	BRH; 3; 9	DON; 1; 12	DON; 2; 9	DON; 3; 17	THR; 1 Ret	THR; 2; 22	THR; 3; 14	OUL; 1; 17	OUL; 2 Ret	OUL; 3 DNS	CRO; 1; 11	CRO; 2 Ret	CRO; 3; 16	SNE; 1; 26	SNE; 2; 16	SNE; 3; 15	KNO; 1; 9	KNO; 2; 8	KNO; 3; 2	ROC; 1; 16	ROC; 2; 18	ROC; 3; 10	SIL; 1; 22	SIL; 2; 17	SIL; 3; 14	BRH; 1 Ret	BRH; 2; 17	BRH; 3; 12	17th	70
2015	Power Maxed Racing	Chevrolet Cruze 4dr	BRH; 1; 17	BRH; 2; 15	BRH; 3; 9	DON; 1; 6	DON; 2; 11	DON; 3 Ret	THR; 1 Ret	THR; 2; 12	THR; 3; 12	OUL; 1; 10	OUL; 2 DNS	OUL; 3; 18	CRO; 1; 15	CRO; 2; 13	CRO; 3; 11	SNE; 1; 8	SNE; 2 Ret	SNE; 3; 14	KNO; 1; 18	KNO; 2; 12	KNO; 3; 11	ROC; 1; 12	ROC; 2 Ret	ROC; 3 Ret	SIL; 1; 4	SIL; 2 Ret	SIL; 3 DNS	BRH; 1; 26	BRH; 2; 4	BRH; 3 Ret	16th	95
2016	Power Maxed Racing	Chevrolet Cruze	BRH; 1	BRH; 2	BRH; 3	DON; 1	DON; 2	DON; 3	THR; 1	THR; 2	THR; 3	OUL; 1	OUL; 2	OUL; 3	CRO; 1	CRO; 2	CRO; 3	SNE; 1	SNE; 2	SNE; 3	KNO; 1; 7	KNO; 2; 14	KNO; 3; 11	ROC; 1; 9	ROC; 2; 11	ROC; 3 Ret	SIL; 1	SIL; 2	SIL; 3	BRH; 1	BRH; 2	BRH; 3	22nd	28
2017	BTC Norlin Racing	Chevrolet Cruze	BRH; 1 Ret	BRH; 2; 17	BRH; 3; 14	DON; 1; 19	DON; 2; 8	**DON**; **3**; 4*	THR; 1; 15	THR; 2; 13	THR; 3; 12	OUL; 1; 24	OUL; 2; 19	OUL; 3; 13	CRO; 1 Ret	CRO; 2; 19	CRO; 3; 15	SNE; 1; 24	SNE; 2; 20	SNE; 3; 13	KNO; 1; 10	KNO; 2; 7	KNO; 3; 10	ROC; 1; 13	ROC; 2; 23	ROC; 3; 10	SIL; 1; 7	SIL; 2; 9	**SIL**; **3**; 3	BRH; 1; 8	BRH; 2 Ret	BRH; 3; 17	14th	108

== Sponsors ==
- Clarke Energy
- Dijitul
- Coffee Drops
- Vendman
