= Geoff Steel =

British racing driver and engineer (1949–2025)

Geoffrey George Steel (March 1949 — 2 October 2025) was a British auto racing driver and engineer. As a driver, he entered selected rounds of the British Touring Car Championship in 1994, with a privately entered BMW 318iS. In 1997 and 1998, he competed in the British GT Championship.

He and his Geoff Steel Racing team developed and raced cars for track and rally, mainly from the BMW marque. The team has run a BMW 320i in 2006 and 2007 for Martyn Bell. The team returned to the BTCC in 2011 with a BMW 320si for reigning Renault Clio Cup champion, Dave Newsham.

== Racing record ==
=== Complete British Touring Car Championship results ===
(key) (Races in bold indicate pole position) (Races in italics indicate fastest lap)

Year	Team	Car	1	2	3	4	5	6	7	8	9	10	11	12	13	14	15	16	17	18	19	20	21	DC	Pts
1994	Geoff Steel Racing	BMW 318is	THR; 22	BRH; 1; 21	BRH; 2; 20	SNE; 18	SIL; 1	SIL; 2	OUL; 18	DON; 1; 24	DON; 2; 21	BRH; 1	BRH; 2	SIL	KNO; 1	KNO; 2	OUL; Ret	BRH; 1; 23	BRH; 2; 13	SIL; 1	SIL; 2	DON; 1	DON; 2	**32nd**	**0**
