= 2016 Mini Challenge UK =

Motor racing competition

Seasons
- ← 2015 2017 →

The 2016 Mini Challenge season was the fifteenth season of the Mini Challenge UK. The season started on 23 April at Donington Park and ended on 30 October at Snetterton Motor Racing Circuit. The season featured eight rounds across the UK.

== Calendar ==
Round	Circuit	Date	Classes	Races
1	Donington Park	23–24 April	JCW, Cooper S, Cooper	3
2	Brands Hatch	7–8 May	JCW	2
3	Silverstone Circuit	28–29 May	All	3
4	Rockingham Motor Speedway	18–19 June	JCW, Cooper S, Cooper	3
5	Brands Hatch	16–17 July	All	3
6	Oulton Park	20 August	All	2
7	Cadwell Park	3 September	Cooper S, Cooper, Open	2
8	Snetterton Motor Racing Circuit	29–30 October	All	3

== Entry list ==
Team	No.	Driver	Rounds
JCW Class
MINI UK VIP	1	(United Kingdom) Charlie Butler-Henderson	All
MINI UK VIP	37	(United Kingdom) Rob Smith	All
MINI UK VIP	52	(United Kingdom) Dan Prosser	1
MINI UK VIP	52	(United Kingdom) Rebecca Jackson	2–3, 5–6
MINI UK VIP	52	(United Kingdom) Richard Aucock	7
MINI UK VIP	61	(United Kingdom) James Turkington	1, 3–7
Sussex Road & Race	2	(United Kingdom) Ben Seyfried	5–6
Sussex Road & Race	194	(United Kingdom) Michael O'Brien	6
Sussex Road & Race	26	(United Kingdom) Luke Reade	1–6
Sussex Road & Race	46	(United Kingdom) Sam Osborne	1–6
Lawrence Davey Racing	46	(United Kingdom) Sam Osborne	7
Lawrence Davey Racing	19	(United Kingdom) Lawrence Davey	All
Lawrence Davey Racing	26	(United Kingdom) Luke Reade	7
Lawrence Davey Racing	68	(United Kingdom) Scot Adam	5
ES Motorsport	7	(United Kingdom) Steve King	1–5, 7
ES Motorsport	45	(United Kingdom) Calum King	All
Excelr8 Motorsport	10	(United Kingdom) Chris Smith	All
Excelr8 Motorsport	13	(Hungary) Bence Balogh	1, 4, 6
Excelr8 Motorsport	18	(United Kingdom) Mark Wakefield	7
Excelr8 Motorsport	59	(Guatemala) Juan Diego Hernandes Leiva	1, 3
Excelr8 Motorsport	68	(United Kingdom) Ben Constanduros	3
Excelr8 Motorsport	69	(United Kingdom) Mark Steward	1–2
Excelr8 Motorsport	79	(United Kingdom) Jono Brown	All
Excelr8 Motorsport	88	(United Kingdom) Reece Barr	7
Excelr8 Motorsport	666	(United Kingdom) Luke Caudle	All
Unitec Motorsport	16	(United Kingdom) David Grady	All
Mark Wakefield Motorsport	18	(United Kingdom) Mark Wakefield	1–6
Coastal Racing	27	(United Kingdom) Nathan Harrison	All
Coastal Racing	89	(United Kingdom) Shane Stoney	1
OX4 Racing	35	(United Kingdom) James Loukes	1–2, 7
OX4 Racing	35	(United Kingdom) Chris Oakman	3–4
OX4 Racing	35	(United Kingdom) Chris Fryer	5–6
Eurotech Racing	39	(United Kingdom) Brett Smith	All
Eurotech Racing	55	(United Kingdom) Jeff Smith	1, 3, 5–7
Eurotech Racing	76	(United Kingdom) Jo Polley	1–3, 5–7
Team Dynamics	42	(United Kingdom) Henry Neal	All
AR Performance	56	(United Kingdom) Adam Cunnington	1–5, 7
Ignis Racing	58	(United Kingdom) Chris Boon	1, 3–7
Ignis Racing	80	(United Kingdom) Nick Boon	All
Oakfield Motorsport	77	(United Kingdom) Neil Newstead	All
Privateer	84	(United Kingdom) Ryan Dignan	6–7
Staffs Racing	99	(United Kingdom) Kevin O'Connor	All
Forster Motorsport	777	(United Kingdom) Arthur Forster	1
Cooper S Class
Excelr8 Motorsport	24	(United Kingdom) Rob Austin	2–5, 7
Excelr8 Motorsport	118	(United Kingdom) Toby Hotston	1
Lawrence Davey Racing	38	(United Kingdom) Scot Adam	All
Oakfield Motorsport	66	(United Kingdom) Steve Ruxton-Cocker	1-4
Oakfield Motorsport	77	(United Kingdom) Neil Newstead	6
Oakfield Motorsport	94	(United Kingdom) Tim Porter	All
Team Maxxis	90	(United Kingdom) Scott Jeffs	1–3, 5–7
Sussex Road & Race	176	(United Kingdom) Carlito Miracco	3–7
Cooper Class
Privateer	4	(United Kingdom) Michael Bamber	All
Privateer	36	(United Kingdom) Marco Haig	1–2, 5–7
Privateer	117	(United Kingdom) Brad Hutchison	All
RTS Motorsport	6	(United Kingdom) Sam Weller	All
Rob Sims Racing	9	(United Kingdom) Simon Walton	1–5
Rob Sims Racing	47	(United Kingdom) James Goodall	All
Rob Sims Racing	91	(United Kingdom) Owen Walton	All
Rob Sims Racing	96	(United Kingdom) Adrian Norman	All
Excelr8 Motorsport	11	(United Kingdom) Max Bladon	All
Excelr8 Motorsport	21	(United Kingdom) Adam Davey	1–4
Excelr8 Motorsport	107	(United Kingdom) Piers Prior	1
Excelr8 Motorsport	107	(United Kingdom) Iain Webber	2
Excelr8 Motorsport	107	(United Kingdom) Luke Chard-Maple	3
Excelr8 Motorsport	107	(United Kingdom) Macaulay Austin	4
Excelr8 Motorsport	107	(United Kingdom) Greg Barnard	5
Excelr8 Motorsport	107	(United Kingdom) Nick Griggs	6
Excelr8 Motorsport	107	(United Kingdom) Will Foulkes	7
Excelr8 Motorsport	108	(United Kingdom) Fraser Rose	5
Team Dynamics	22	(United Kingdom) Will Neal	All
Mintech	14	(United Kingdom) Tony Lynch	1
Coastal Racing	17	(United Kingdom) Josh Gollin	All
Coastal Racing	20	(United Kingdom) Kyle Reid	1, 5
Coastal Racing	25	(United Kingdom) Nathaniel Gollin	2–4, 7
Coastal Racing	29	(United Kingdom) Morgan Jones	1–5
Coastal Racing	49	(United Kingdom) Martin Poole	1–2, 4–7
Coastal Racing	87	(United Kingdom) Max Leaver	4
Coastal Racing	93	(United Kingdom) Ollie Walker	4
Lawrence Davey Racing	98	(United Kingdom) Darren Chatt	4
Open Class
Privateer	5	(United Kingdom) Chloe Hewitt	All
Privateer	28	(United Kingdom) Martyn Hathaway	2–3, 5
Privateer	114	(United Kingdom) Sam Hathaway	2–3, 5
Privateer	196	(United Kingdom) Taelor Shand	5
Sussex Road & Race	23	(United Kingdom) Simon Clark	All
Sussex Road & Race	555	(United Kingdom) Andrew Bailey	1–2
Oakfield Motorsport	33	(United Kingdom) Stuart Lane	1–3
RTS Motorsport	34	(United Kingdom) Richard Mills	All
AReeve Motorsport	44	(United Kingdom) Aaron Reeve	1–3, 5
AReeve Motorsport	83	(United Kingdom) Laura Davis	3
AReeve Motorsport	121	(United Kingdom) Jono Davis	All
AReeve Motorsport	606	(United Kingdom) Tim Bill	5
Lawrence Davey Racing	81	(United Kingdom) Keith Issatt	All

== Championship standings ==
Scoring system

Championship points were awarded for the first 32 positions in each Championship Race. Entries were required to complete 75% of the winning car's race distance in order to be classified and earn points. There were bonus points awarded for Pole Position and Fastest Lap.

Championship Race points

Position	1st	2nd	3rd	4th	5th	6th	7th	8th	9th	10th	11th	12th	13th	14th	15th	16th	17th	18th	19th	20th	21st	22nd	23rd	24th	25th	26th	27th	28th	29th	30th	31st	32nd
Points	50	44	40	37	34	32	30	28	26	24	22	21	20	19	18	17	16	15	14	13	12	11	10	9	8	7	6	5	4	3	2	1

=== Drivers' Championship ===
==== JCW Class ====
Pos	Driver	DON			BHGP		SIL			ROC			BHI			OUL		SNE			Pts
1	David Grady	5	C	3	9	9	1	1	19	8	9	3	2	1	3	2	15	1	1	C	623
2	Nathan Harrison	2	C	1	3	2	3	2	3	3	4	1	9	9	9	12	DNS	2	2	C	614
3	Charlie Butler-Henderson	1	C	2	4	1	5	3	2	7	3	2	3	4	8	Ret	DNS	3	3	C	604
4	Jono Brown	6	C	16	1	5	4	4	1	1	1	16	5	18	13	4	14	5	6	C	561
5	Brett Smith	12	C	6	6	6	6	6	4	2	5	Ret	1	2	6	Ret	1	4	4	C	558
6	Chris Smith	3	C	4	2	4	2	5	11	4	2	5	11	10	7	Ret	Ret	10	13	C	501
7	Rob Smith	4	C	9	5	3	8	14	8	5	6	Ret	4	3	2	Ret	3	12	10	C	492
8	Lawrence Davey	17	C	10	7	8	7	8	5	9	15	12	18	8	5	13	4	9	8	C	450
9	Henry Neal	11	C	17	11	13	13	10	9	6	7	6	12	7	4	Ret	2	8	5	C	447
10	Mark Wakefield	Ret	C	18	8	12	11	12	10	12	10	4	17	11	10	7	13	15	12	C	374
11	Sam Osborne	9	C	12	12	10	14	13	12	23	17	10	16	15	14	14	17	6	7	C	351
12	James Turkington	10	C	11			10	9	7	14	20	7	13	12	Ret	11	6	7	9	C	349
13	Neil Newstead	7	C	5	15	15	Ret	17	13	11	13	Ret	10	6	12	6	21	11	Ret	C	331
14	Luke Caudle	Ret	C	13	10	7	12	Ret	DNS	15	8	8	8	5	1	3	12	Ret	DSQ	C	316
15	Calum King	20	C	20	16	18	16	16	14	16	11	9	19	17	Ret	8	16	Ret	20	C	276
16	Luke Reade	Ret	C	15	14	14	Ret	Ret	22	10	21	11	6	DNS	17	20	5	13	14	C	265
17	Chris Boon	15	C	DNS			15	Ret	15	22	16	14	15	16	15	9	20	20	18	C	230
18	Nick Boon	21	C	19	20	20	19	Ret	20	19	Ret	17	21	21	18	17	10	18	22	C	227
19	Jeff Smith	Ret	C	8			Ret	11	16				7	14	11	1	Ret	14	11	C	218
20	Adam Cunnington	13	C	14	18	16	17	21	25	13	Ret	DNS	27	20	16			19	17	C	203
21	Kevin O'Connor	Ret	C	DNS	19	17	23	22	24	21	19	15	23	23	19	Ret	9	23	23	C	197
22	Jo Polley	18	C	24	21	21	21	19	18				24	24	20	19	11	22	21	C	187
23	Steve King	22	C	Ret	23	23	22	20	23	20	18	18	26	25	Ret			24	24	C	154
24	Bence Balogh	8	C	DNS						17	12	Ret				10	7			C	116
25	Chris Oakman		C				18	18	21	18	14	13								C	101
26	James Loukes	23	C	21	13	11												17	16	C	99
27	Chris Fryer		C										22	19	22	15	18			C	75
28	Mark Steward	Ret	C	26	17	19														C	38
29	Reece Barr		C															16	15	C	35
30	Shane Stoney	16	C	23																C	30
31	Arthur Forster	19	C	22																C	29
32	Dan Prosser	Ret	C	25																C	9
drivers ineligible for points
–	Michael O'Brien		C													5	Ret			C	0
–	Juan Diego Hernandes Leiva	14	C	7			9	7	6											C	0
–	Ben Seyfried		C										14	13	DNS	Ret	8			C	0
–	Ben Constanduros		C				20	14	17											C	0
–	Ryan Dignan		C													16	19	21	19	C	0
–	Rebecca Jackson		C		22	22	Ret	23	26				25	Ret	21	18	Ret			C	0
–	Scot Adam		C										20	22	DNS					C	0
–	Richard Aucock		C															25	25	C	0

Colour	Result
Gold	Winner
Silver	Second place
Bronze	Third place
Green	Points classification
Blue	Non-points classification
Blue	Non-classified finish (NC)
Purple	Retired, not classified (Ret)
Red	Did not qualify (DNQ)
Red	Did not pre-qualify (DNPQ)
Black	Disqualified (DSQ)
White	Did not start (DNS)
White	Withdrew (WD)
White	Race cancelled (C)
Blank	Did not practice (DNP)
Blank	Did not arrive (DNA)
Blank	Excluded (EX)

==== Cooper S Class ====
Pos	Driver	DON			SIL			ROC			BHI			OUL		CAD		SNE			Pts
1	Scott Jeffs	4	1	1	1	1	3	4	4	3		C		2	3	2	2	1	1	C	675
2	Scot Adam	2	Ret	DNS	2	2	2	2	1	4	3	C	2	3	1	Ret	3	4	2	C	645
3	Tim Porter	3	3	2	4	4	5	3	5	1	2	C	5	5	4	3	Ret	2	3	C	633
4	Steve Ruxton-Cocker	1	2	Ret	5	5	1	1	2	2	5	C	4								442
5	Carlito Miracco							5	3	Ret	4	C	3	1	2	Ret	1	5	4	C	378
6	Rob Austin				3	3	4	Ret	6	3	1	C	1	4	DNS			3	Ret	C	369
7	Toby Hotston	5	4	3								C								C	111
8	Neil Newstead											C				1	Ret			C	50

==== Cooper Class ====
Pos	Driver	DON			SIL			ROC			BHI			OUL		CAD		SNE			Pts
1	Max Bladon	1	1	1	1	1	1	1	1	1	1	C	1	2	2	1	4	1	1	C	812
2	Josh Gollin	2	2	2	4	13	6	2	4	4	2	C	3	DSQ	5	6	1	9	8	C	570
3	Sam Weller	4	4	Ret	5	2	2	4	Ret	Ret	6	C	2	4	3	4	3	4	6	C	537
4	Brad Hutchison	Ret	6	DSQ	3	Ret	12	5	2	2	Ret	C	4	3	Ret	2	5	4	3	C	488
5	Will Neal	8	13	Ret	9	10	11	11	9	5	12	C	8	Ret	10	5	2	3	2	C	473
6	Michael Bamber	5	10	Ret	2	4	Ret	6	6	6	4	C	4	Ret	7	7	6	8	Ret	C	467
7	Owen Walton	10	12	11	6	11	10	8	5	11	9	C	10	8	8	DNS	DNS	7	7	C	394
8	James Goodall	9	9	10	10	5	5	7	7	3	13	C	11	Ret	Ret	Ret	DNS	10	9	C	392
9	Adrian Norman	11	14	8	12	9	9	12	11	7	10	C	Ret	7	Ret	8	8	11	11	C	367
10	Martin Poole	Ret	7	7	Ret	6	3				14	C	Ret	5	1	3	Ret	2	4	C	349
11	Marco Haig	6	8	Ret	8	12	8					C		6	6	10	7	12	12	C	294
12	Simon Walton	Ret	15	5	13	8	4	3	3	DNS	3	C	DNS	Ret	DNS					C	270
13	Adam Davey	7	3	9	7	3	DSQ	10	8	10	8	C	DNS							C	262
14	Nathaniel Gollin				11	7	7	9	Ret	Ret	11	C	9					6	5	C	228
15	Morgan Jones	Ret	11	6	14	14	13	Ret	12	8	WD	C	WD	Ret	9					C	196
16	Kyle Reid	Ret	Ret	3								C		1	4					C	127
17	Piers Prior	3	5	4								C								C	108
18	Luke Chard-Maple							13	10	9		C								C	70
19	Iain Webber				15	15	14					C								C	55
20	Nick Griggs											C				9	9			C	52
21	Macaulay Austin										15	C	7							C	48
22	Fraser Rose											C		10	11					C	46
23	Will Foulkes											C						13	10	C	44
24	Ollie Walker										5	C	Ret							C	34
25	Max Leaver										Ret	C	6							C	32
26	Darren Chatt										7	C	Ret							C	30
27	Greg Barnard											C		9	Ret					C	26
28	Tony Lynch	12	Ret	DNS								C								C	21

==== Open Class ====
Pos	Driver	SIL			BHI			OUL		CAD		SNE			Pts
1	Keith Issatt	1	2	2	1	C	1	1	6	2	2	2	2	C	482
2	Jono Davis	4	3	Ret	4	C	2	4	1	1	1	1	1	C	457
3	Richard Mills	2	4	1	2	C	4	3	2	4	3	3	3	C	422
4	Chloe Hewitt	5	6	4	8	C	DNS	5	4	5	4	5	7	C	337
5	Simon Clark	DNS	5	3	5	C	3	2	3	3	Ret	Ret	6	C	307
6	Stuart Lane	3	1	5	3	C	6	DNS	DNS					C	202
7	Aaron Reeve	Ret	Ret	Ret	6	C	5	Ret	Ret			4	4	C	140
8	Sam Hathaway				7	C	7	DNS	DNS			Ret	5	C	60
9	Tim Bill					C						6	10	C	56
10	Taelor Shand					C						7	9	C	56
11	Martyn Hathaway				9	C	8	DNS	DNS			Ret	8	C	54
12	Laura Davis					C		Ret	5					C	34
13	Andrew Bailey	Ret	Ret	DNS	Ret	C	Ret							C	0
