= 2017 Mini Challenge UK =

Motor racing competition

The 2017 Mini Challenge season was the sixteenth season of the Mini Challenge UK. The season started on 15 April at Oulton Park and ended on 15 October at Snetterton Motor Racing Circuit. The season featured thirteen rounds across the UK.

== Calendar ==
Round	Circuit	Date	Classes	Races
1	Oulton Park International	15, 17 April	JCW	2
2	Rockingham ISSC	29–30 April	JCW	2
3	Snetterton 200	13–14 May	Open, Cooper Pro, Cooper Am	3
4	Snetterton 300	27–28 May	JCW	3
5	Silverstone National	3–4 June	Open, Cooper Pro, Cooper Am	3
6	Silverstone GP	10–11 June	JCW	2
7	Rockingham ISSC	24 June	Open, Cooper Pro, Cooper Am	2
8	Brands Hatch Indy	8–9 July	All	3
9	Brands Hatch GP	5–6 August	JCW	2
10	Oulton Park Fosters	19 August	All	2
11	Donington Park	16–17 September	Open, Cooper Pro, Cooper Am	2
12	Donington Park	23–24 September	JCW	2
13	Snetterton 300	14–15 October	Open, Cooper Pro, Cooper Am	3

== Entry list ==
Team	No.	Driver	Rounds
JCW Class
Unitec Motorsport	1	(United Kingdom) David Grady	All
Excelr8 Motorsport	3	(United Kingdom) Rebecca Jackson	All
Excelr8 Motorsport	11	(United Kingdom) Max Bladon	All
Excelr8 Motorsport	18	(United Kingdom) Mark Wakefield	All
Excelr8 Motorsport	21	(India) Mohammed Nalwalla	1–4
Excelr8 Motorsport	30	(United Kingdom) Luke Caudle	6
Excelr8 Motorsport	46	(United Kingdom) Stuart Gibbs	All
Excelr8 Motorsport	51	(United Kingdom) Freddie Lee	1–3, 5
Excelr8 Motorsport	51	(United Kingdom) Jack Wright	6
Excelr8 Motorsport	9	(United Kingdom) Ray MacDowall	7–8
Excelr8 Motorsport	77	(United Kingdom) Ray MacDowall	5
Excelr8 Motorsport	77	(United Kingdom) Andy Knight	1–2, 7
Excelr8 Motorsport	80	(United Kingdom) Nick Boon	1
Excelr8 Motorsport	88	(United Kingdom) Reece Barr	All
Eurotech Racing	4	(United Kingdom) Ben Winrow	4
Eurotech Racing	39	(United Kingdom) Brett Smith	All
Eurotech Racing	55	(United Kingdom) Jeff Smith	1–3
Eurotech Racing	74	(United Kingdom) Neil Newstead	5
Eurotech Racing	76	(United Kingdom) Jo Polley	1–3, 6–7
ES Motorsport	7	(United Kingdom) Steve King	1–4, 7–8
ES Motorsport	45	(United Kingdom) Calum King	1–4, 7–8
MINI UK VIP	15	(United Kingdom) Charlie Butler-Henderson	All
MINI UK VIP	16	(United Kingdom) David Robinson	8
MINI UK VIP	37	(United Kingdom) Rob Smith	All
MINI UK VIP	52	(United Kingdom) James Taylor	1
MINI UK VIP	52	(United Kingdom) Tim Burton	2
MINI UK VIP	52	(United Kingdom) Vicki Butler-Henderson	3
MINI UK VIP	52	(United Kingdom) JM Littman	4
MINI UK VIP	52	(United Kingdom) Mark Blundell	5
MINI UK VIP	52	(United Kingdom) Ben Barry	6
MINI UK VIP	52	(United Kingdom) Mia Flewitt	8
MINI UK VIP	61	(United Kingdom) James Turkington	1–5
MINI UK VIP	77	(United Kingdom) George Wright	6
Privateer	17	(United Kingdom) Brad Hutchison	All
Privateer	84	(United Kingdom) Ryan Dignan	All
Privateer	90	(United Kingdom) Scott Jeffs	All
Lawrence Davey Racing	19	(United Kingdom) Lawrence Davey	4–6
Lawrence Davey Racing	20	(United Kingdom) Kyle Reid	3
Lawrence Davey Racing	29	(United Kingdom) Stuart Gough	8
Lawrence Davey Racing	32	(United Kingdom) Dean Brace	1–6, 8
Team Dynamics	22	(United Kingdom) Will Neal	All
Team Dynamics	42	(United Kingdom) Henry Neal	All
AReeve Motorsport	27	(United Kingdom) Gary Curtis	8
AReeve Motorsport	69	(United Kingdom) Jesse Chamberlin	4
AReeve Motorsport	78	(United Kingdom) Richard O'Dwyer	All
AReeve Motorsport	87	(United Kingdom) Paul Bell	All
AReeve Motorsport	126	(United Kingdom) Sarah Moore	6
AReeve Motorsport	777	(United Kingdom) Kenan Dole	5, 8
TDF with Moorgate Motorsport Finance	29	(United Kingdom) Stuart Gough	1–5
OX4 Racing	35	(United Kingdom) Chris Fryer	1, 7
OX4 Racing	35	(United Kingdom) Chris Oakman	2–3
OX4 Racing	35	(United Kingdom) James Loukes	4–5
Staffs Racing	99	(United Kingdom) Kevin O'Connor	1–7
George Sutton Racing	444	(United Kingdom) George Sutton	All
Open Class
Privateer	5	(United Kingdom) Chloe Hewitt	All
Privateer	26	(United Kingdom) Andy Montgomery	All
Privateer	111	(United Kingdom) Neil Ginley	All
AReeve Motorsport	8	(United Kingdom) Kevin Owen	1–4, 6–7
AReeve Motorsport	33	(United Kingdom) Stu Lane	2
AReeve Motorsport	33	(United Kingdom) Tim Bill	3
AReeve Motorsport	606	(United Kingdom) Tim Bill	1–2, 4–7
AReeve Motorsport	44	(United Kingdom) Aaron Reeve	All
AReeve Motorsport	63	(United Kingdom) Darryl Brown	4
AReeve Motorsport	94	(United Kingdom) Scot Adam	1
AReeve Motorsport	121	(United Kingdom) Jono Davis	1, 7
Excelr8 Motorsport	24	(United Kingdom) Rob Austin	All
College of West Anglia	53	(United Kingdom) Andrew Tsang	1–2
College of West Anglia	53	(United Kingdom) Neal Clarke	7
Sussex Road and Race	77	(United Kingdom) Ben Dimmack	All
Cooper Pro Class
Privateer	4	(United Kingdom) Michael Bamber	2, 5
Privateer	49	(United Kingdom) Martin Poole	1–5, 7
Hybrid Tune Motorsport	6	(United Kingdom) Sam Weller	All
Rob Sims Racing	9	(United Kingdom) Simon Walton	1–4, 6–7
Rob Sims Racing	47	(United Kingdom) James Goodall	All
Rob Sims Racing	91	(United Kingdom) Owen Walton	All
Rob Sims Racing	99	(United Kingdom) Fulvio Mussi	5
Team Dynamics	20	(United Kingdom) Craig Smith	2
Excelr8 Motorsport	23	(United Kingdom) Ethan Pitt	6–7
Excelr8 Motorsport	31	(United Kingdom) Jessica Hawkins	All
Excelr8 Motorsport	36	(United Kingdom) Mark Cornell	All
Excelr8 Motorsport	56	(United Kingdom) Richard Newman	All
Excelr8 Motorsport	126	(United Kingdom) Bryony King	5–7
Excelr8 Motorsport	888	(United Kingdom) Matt Hammond	All
AReeve Motorsport	74	(United Kingdom) Rob Butler	7
AReeve Motorsport	126	(United Kingdom) Sarah Moore	4
Sussex Road and Race	98	(United Kingdom) Darren Chatt	All
Cooper Am Class
Sussex Road and Race	10	(United Kingdom) Paul Townsend	1
Hybrid Tune Motorsport	12	(United Kingdom) Stuart McLaren	All
Excelr8 Motorsport	21	(United Kingdom) Nicolas Griebner	1
Excelr8 Motorsport	21	(United Kingdom) Daniel Bishop	2–3
Excelr8 Motorsport	21	(United Kingdom) Chris Day	4
AReeve Motorsport	46	(United Kingdom) Andy Godfrey	All
AReeve Motorsport	63	(United Kingdom) Darryl Brown	5–7
College of West Anglia	50	(United Kingdom) Neal Clarke	1–4
College of West Anglia	50	(United Kingdom) Gary Papworth	5–7
College of West Anglia	78	(United Kingdom) Chris Middleton	All
Rob Sims Racing	54	(United Kingdom) Adrian Norman	All
Privateer	217	(United Kingdom) Dale Jamieson	All

== Results ==
Round		Circuit	Pole position	Fastest lap	Winning driver	Winning team
1	1	Oulton Park International	(United Kingdom) Max Bladon	(United Kingdom) Brett Smith	(United Kingdom) Mark Wakefield	Excelr8 Motorsport
1	2	Oulton Park International		(United Kingdom) Rob Smith	(United Kingdom) Charlie Butler-Henderson	MINI UK VIP
2	3	Rockingham ISSC	(United Kingdom) Max Bladon	(United Kingdom) James Turkington	(United Kingdom) Max Bladon	Excelr8 Motorsport
2	4	Rockingham ISSC		(United Kingdom) Reece Barr	(United Kingdom) Reece Barr	Excelr8 Motorsport
3	5	Snetterton 300	(United Kingdom) Rob Smith	(United Kingdom) Brett Smith	(United Kingdom) Jeff Smith	Eurotech Racing
3	6	Snetterton 300		(United Kingdom) Brett Smith	(United Kingdom) Brett Smith	Eurotech Racing
3	7	Snetterton 300		(United Kingdom) David Grady	(United Kingdom) Brett Smith	Eurotech Racing
4	8	Silverstone GP	(United Kingdom) Brett Smith	(United Kingdom) Rob Smith	(United Kingdom) Brett Smith	Eurotech Racing
4	9	Silverstone GP		(United Kingdom) Rob Smith	(United Kingdom) Max Bladon	Excelr8 Motorsport
5	10	Brands Hatch Indy	(United Kingdom) Rob Smith	(United Kingdom) Charlie Butler-Henderson	(United Kingdom) Rob Smith	MINI UK VIP
5	11	Brands Hatch Indy		(United Kingdom) Brett Smith	(United Kingdom) Charlie Butler-Henderson	MINI UK VIP
5	12	Brands Hatch Indy		(United Kingdom) Brett Smith	(United Kingdom) David Grady	Unitec Motorsport
6	13	Brands Hatch GP	(United Kingdom) Rob Smith	(United Kingdom) Mark Wakefield	(United Kingdom) Rob Smith	MINI UK VIP
6	14	Brands Hatch GP		(United Kingdom) Lawrence Davey	(United Kingdom) Brett Smith	Eurotech Racing
7	15	Oulton Park Fosters	(United Kingdom) Max Bladon	(United Kingdom) Brett Smith	(United Kingdom) Henry Neal	Team Dynamics
7	16	Oulton Park Fosters		(United Kingdom) Charlie Butler-Henderson	(United Kingdom) George Sutton	George Sutton Racing
8	17	Donington Park GP	(United Kingdom) Brett Smith	(United Kingdom) Brett Smith	(United Kingdom) Brett Smith	Eurotech Racing
8	18	Donington Park GP		(United Kingdom) Brett Smith	(United Kingdom) Brett Smith	Eurotech Racing

== Championship standings ==
Scoring system

Championship points were awarded for the first 32 positions in each Championship Race. Entries were required to complete 75% of the winning car's race distance in order to be classified and earn points. There were bonus points awarded for Pole Position and Fastest Lap.

Championship Race points

Position	1st	2nd	3rd	4th	5th	6th	7th	8th	9th	10th	11th	12th	13th	14th	15th	16th	17th	18th	19th	20th	21st	22nd	23rd	24th	25th	26th	27th	28th	29th	30th	31st	32nd
Points	50	44	40	37	34	32	30	28	26	24	22	21	20	19	18	17	16	15	14	13	12	11	10	9	8	7	6	5	4	3	2	1

=== Drivers' Championship ===
==== JCW Class ====
Pos	Driver	OUL		ROC		SNE			SIL		BHI			BHGP		OUL		DON		Pts
1	(United Kingdom) Brett Smith	2	4	7	4	3	1	1	1	4	2	2	2	3	1	2	4	1	1	838
2	(United Kingdom) Reece Barr	6	6	3	1	2	Ret	12	7	6	8	4	3	8	5	3	2	4	4	580
3	(United Kingdom) David Grady	10	8	4	2	6	3	5	14	12	7	3	1	7	Ret	5	11	3	3	571
4	(United Kingdom) Charlie Butler-Henderson	3	1	5	3	10	10	Ret	25	13	3	1	4	5	3	Ret	9	7	5	543
5	(United Kingdom) Max Bladon	4	2	1	11	4	5	11	5	1	12	Ret	11	Ret	21	9	3	6	8	528
6	(United Kingdom) Rob Smith	7	3	11	12	Ret	9	3	2	2	1	Ret	9	1	Ret	Ret	DNS	2	2	517
7	(United Kingdom) George Sutton	15	9	DNS	16	23	8	8	8	7	14	5	6	13	9	4	1	5	5	469
8	(United Kingdom) Mark Wakefield	1	5	2	28	7	4	2	3	3	5	Ret	7	6	Ret	Ret	DNS	17	11	464
9	(United Kingdom) Henry Neal	11	11	DNS	9	13	11	15	6	11	4	Ret	15	11	7	1	Ret	12	Ret	362
10	(United Kingdom) Brad Hutchison	9	22	6	6	11	Ret	13	11	8	Ret	13	18	15	13	13	8	14	10	357
11	(United Kingdom) Stuart Gough	12	13	9	5	22	12	6	9	14	10	7	5					8	7	354
12	(United Kingdom) Scott Jeffs	26	18	8	7	Ret	19	25	15	16	16	8	12	21	12	8	6	16	14	332
13	(United Kingdom) Dean Brace	13	17	18	Ret	Ret	14	7	12	9	13	10	17	10	8			13	15	297
14	(United Kingdom) Paul Bell	18	14	13	15	Ret	18	19	17	18	21	16	22	17	15	6	10	Ret	18	277
15	(United Kingdom) Will Neal	23	25	DNS	20	19	DNS	DNS	21	17	15	11	13	14	14	7	5	10	16	276
16	(United Kingdom) Ryan Dignan	16	10	21	14	16	15	18	16	Ret	19	20	20	16	21	Ret	12	15	17	273
17	(United Kingdom) James Turkington	5	Ret	10	8	5	7	4	4	5	DNS	DNS	DNS							264
18	(United Kingdom) Lawrence Davey								10	15	6	15	8	2	2					214
19	(United Kingdom) Rebecca Jackson	28	23	20	24	20	20	23	Ret	21	23	18	23	Ret	18	12	14	18	21	202
20	(United Kingdom) Jeff Smith	8	7	14	Ret	1	2	10												195
21	(United Kingdom) Calum King	14	Ret	DNS	18	12	17	14	Ret	DNS						15	7	11	12	181
22	(United Kingdom) Stuart Gibbs	30	28	22	25	24	22	24	23	22	24	19	24	Ret	20	17	17	19	20	181
23	(United Kingdom) Kevin O'Connor	22	24	19	17	Ret	23	21	19	24	22	14	19	19	16	DNS	DNS			170
24	(India) Mohammed Nalwalla	27	19	12	10	14	13	9	Ret	19										144
25	(United Kingdom) Freddie Lee	DNS	DNS	17	13	8	6	Ret			17	Ret	10							136
26	(United Kingdom) Richard O'Dwyer	25	20	23	21	Ret	Ret	Ret	18	23	20	17	21	Ret	Ret	10	Ret	Ret	DNS	133
27	(United Kingdom) Jo Polley	20	21	Ret	23	18	Ret	22						DNS	19	11	13			117
28	(United Kingdom) Steve King	24	27	15	26	21	DNS	DNS	24	DNS						14	15	Ret	19	112
29	(United Kingdom) James Loukes								13	10	11	DNS	16							83
30	(United Kingdom) Andy Knight	29	26	16	22											16	16			73
31	(United Kingdom) Chris Oakman			Ret	19	15	16	17												65
32	(United Kingdom) Chris Fryer	19	15													Ret	DNS			32
33	(United Kingdom) Nick Boon	21	16																	31
34	(United Kingdom) Jesse Chamberlin								20	20										26
35	(United Kingdom) Ben Winrow								22	DNS										11
drivers ineligible for points
–	(United Kingdom) Luke Caudle													9	4					0
–	(United Kingdom) Sarah Moore													4	6					0
–	(United Kingdom) Neil Newstead										9	6	Ret							0
–	(United Kingdom) Kyle Reid					9	24	16												0
–	(United Kingdom) Kenan Dole										18	9	14					9	13	0
–	(United Kingdom) David Robinson																	Ret	9	0
–	(United Kingdom) Jack Wright													12	10					0
–	(United Kingdom) James Taylor	17	12																	0
–	(United Kingdom) Mark Blundell										Ret	12	Ret							0
–	(United Kingdom) Vicki Butler-Henderson					17	21	20												0
–	(United Kingdom) Ben Barry													20	17					0
–	(United Kingdom) George Wright													18	Ret					0
–	(United Kingdom) Mia Flewitt																	20	22	0
–	(United Kingdom) Gary Curtis																	21	23	0
–	(United Kingdom) Tim Burton			24	27															0
–	(United Kingdom) JM Littman								Ret	Ret										0
–	(United Kingdom) Ray MacDowall										Ret	Ret	Ret			Ret	DNS	DNS	DNS	0

Colour	Result
Gold	Winner
Silver	Second place
Bronze	Third place
Green	Points classification
Blue	Non-points classification
Blue	Non-classified finish (NC)
Purple	Retired, not classified (Ret)
Red	Did not qualify (DNQ)
Red	Did not pre-qualify (DNPQ)
Black	Disqualified (DSQ)
White	Did not start (DNS)
White	Withdrew (WD)
White	Race cancelled (C)
Blank	Did not practice (DNP)
Blank	Did not arrive (DNA)
Blank	Excluded (EX)

==== Open Class ====
Pos	Driver	SNE			SIL			ROC		BHI			OUL		DON		SNE			Pts
1	(United Kingdom) Ben Dimamck	3	2	3	Ret	3	1	1	2	1	1	2	1	Ret	2	1	3	2	2	778
2	(United Kingdom) Rob Austin	4	4	8	2	1	4	2	1	2	3	1	2	1	3	2	4	4	DNS	709
3	(United Kingdom) Aaron Reeve	Ret	Ret	5	Ret	5	3	3	3	3	2	3	6	Ret	1	Ret	2	1	1	568
4	(United Kingdom) Andy Montgomery	5	6	7	3	6	Ret	5	5	6	7	6	3	2	Ret	4	8	7	6	541
5	(United Kingdom) Chloe Hewitt	7	7	9	5	9	6	8	8	7	6	5	4	3	5	3	6	6	4	530
6	(United Kingdom) Neil Ginley	9	10	11	4	8	7	6	7	8	Ret	DNS	5	5	7	6	7	9	7	473
7	(United Kingdom) Kevin Owen	8	9	10	6	7	Ret	7	6	5	5	4			4	5	DNS	10	6	430
8	(United Kingdom) Tim Bill	6	8	6	Ret	DNS	DNS	4	4	4	4	7	Ret	4	6	Ret	9	8	5	427
9	(United Kingdom) Jono Davis	2	3	1													1	3	Ret	236
10	(United Kingdom) Andrew Tsang	Ret	5	4	DSQ	4	2													158
11	(United Kingdom) Scot Adam	1	1	2																156
12	(United Kingdom) Stu Lane				1	2	5													134
13	(United Kingdom) Neal Clarke																5	5	3	114
14	(United Kingdom) Darryl Brown									9	8	8								84

==== Cooper Pro Class ====
Pos	Driver	SNE			SIL			ROC		BHI			OUL		DON		SNE			Pts
1	(United Kingdom) Matt Hammond	Ret	5	1	2	2	2	4	1	1	1	1	4	Ret	1	1	4	4	3	761
2	(United Kingdom) Jessica Hawkins	1	1	3	1	1	3	1	5	4	4	3	3	2	2	4	2	3	4	727
3	(United Kingdom) Sam Weller	3	4	10	6	3	1	3	4	2	2	4	11	3	4	2	1	1	1	702
4	(United Kingdom) Owen Walton	5	2	6	7	4	8	2	2	3	6	5	7	4	6	8	Ret	9	9	575
5	(United Kingdom) Martin Poole	4	Ret	5	3	5	4	6	3	9	3	2	9	Ret			3	2	2	538
6	(United Kingdom) Richard Newman	2	3	4	5	Ret	5	5	6	5	9	9	2	Ret	3	3	5	Ret	8	523
7	(United Kingdom) James Goodall	6	8	8	8	7	6	9	8	7	Ret	8	6	Ret	5	5	7	7	7	488
8	(United Kingdom) Simon Walton	7	6	2	4	8	Ret	7	7	5	5	7			8	Ret	6	6	6	459
9	(United Kingdom) Mark Cornell	9	7	9	12	10	10	10	10	11	10	11	10	7	9	6	9	8	11	459
10	(United Kingdom) Darren Chatt	8	9	7	9	9	9	8	9	8	8	10	5	8	10	Ret	10	Ret	Ret	411
11	(United Kingdom) Bryony King												8	6	7	7	11	10	10	124
12	(United Kingdom) Ethan Pitt														11	9	8	5	5	144
13	(United Kingdom) Michael Bamber				11	6	7						Ret	5						121
14	(United Kingdom) Sarah Moore									6	7	6								94
15	(United Kingdom) Craig Smith				10	11	Ret													46
16	(United Kingdom) Rob Butler																Ret	Ret	12	21
drivers ineligible for points
–	(United Kingdom) Fulvio Mussi												1	1						0

==== Cooper Am Class ====
Pos	Driver	SNE			SIL			ROC		BHI			OUL		DON		SNE			Pts
1	(United Kingdom) Stuart McLaren	1	1	1	7	3	1	3	3	1	2	2	1	1	1	6	1	1	1	886
2	(United Kingdom) Chris Middleton	3	4	2	2	2	3	2	2	3	1	4	4	2	Ret	2	2	2	2	739
3	(United Kingdom) Andy Godfrey	7	5	5	3	4	5	6	4	4	4	1	2	4	2	1	6	3	4	704
4	(United Kingdom) Adrian Norman	4	2	3	4	6	6	4	Ret	7	6	5	3	3	5	3	5	6	6	609
5	(United Kingdom) Dale Jamieson	Ret	DNS	DNS	5	5	4	7	5	6	Ret	7	6	6	3	4	4	5	5	477
6	(United Kingdom) Neal Clarke	5	3	4	6	7	7	5	Ret	5	3	6								343
7	(United Kingdom) Daniel Bishop				1	1	2	1	1											280
8	(United Kingdom) Gray Papworth												5	5	4	Ret	3	4	3	222
9	(United Kingdom) Darryl Brown												7	7	6	5	7	7	DNS	186
10	(United Kingdom) Chris Day									2	5	3								128
11	(United Kingdom) Paul Townsend	6	6	6																96
12	(United Kingdom) Nicolas Griebner	2	DNS	DNS																44
