= Jeff Smith (British racing driver) =

British racing driver and businessman (born 1966)

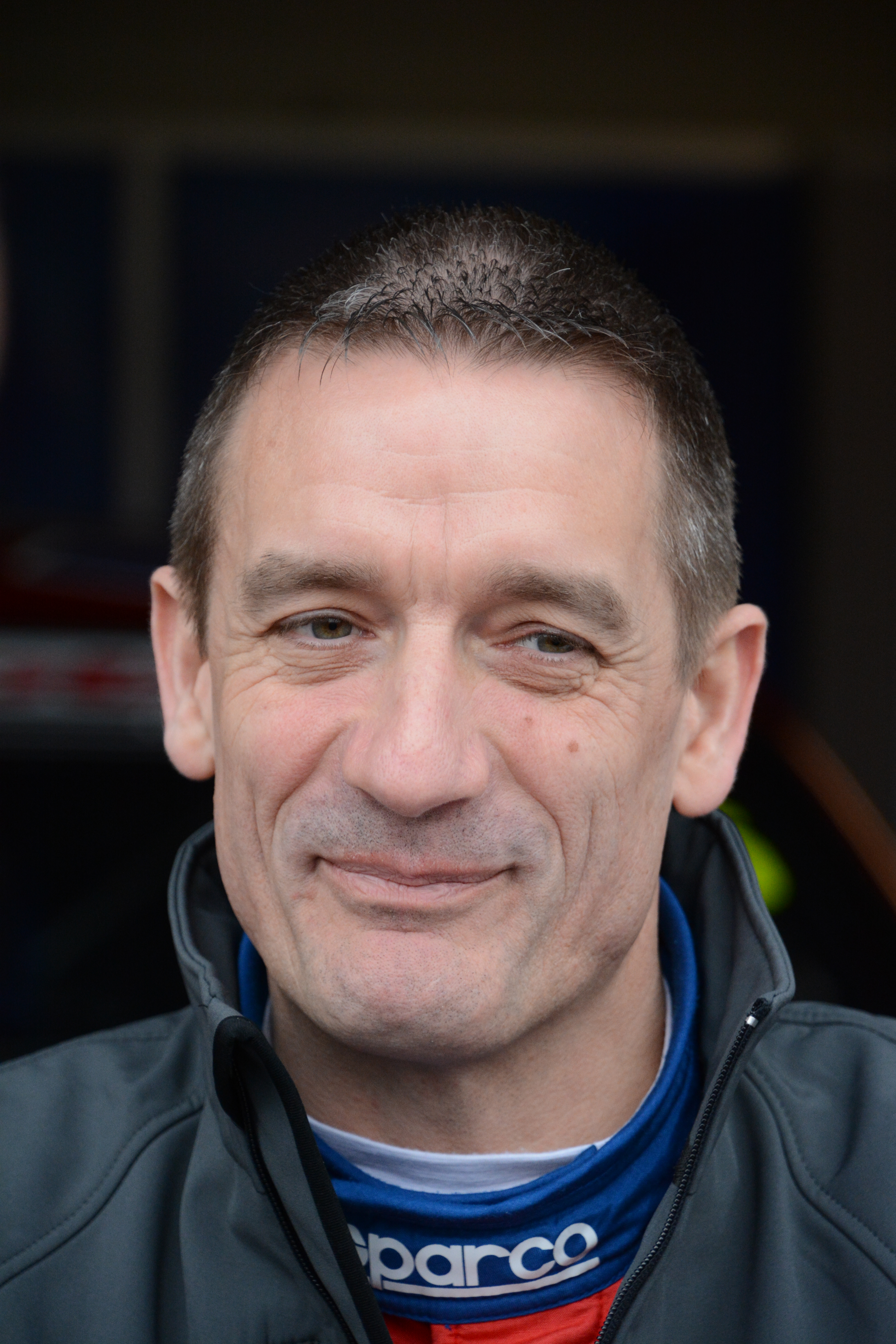
- Smith in 2015
- Nationality: (United Kingdom) British
- Born: Jeffrey Frank Smith; 27 March 1966 (age 60) Coventry, England
- Relatives: Brett Smith (son)

British Touring Car Championship career
- Debut season: 2010
- Current team: Eurotech Racing
- Car number: 55
- Former teams: Triple 8 Race Engineering
- Starts: 156
- Wins: 0
- Poles: 1
- Fastest laps: 1
- Best finish: 12th in 2012

Previous series
- 2016–17 2015 2014 2014 2012 2010 2009 2008–10 2008–10: Mini Challenge UK; 24H Series; British GT Championship; Michelin Clio Cup Race Series; Superstars Series; Renault Clio Cup France; Trofeo Abarth 500 Europe; Renault Clio Cup United Kingdom; Renault Clio Cup Italia

Jeffrey Frank Smith (born 27 March 1966) is a British racing driver and businessman. He is the owner of Industrial Control Distributors and Eurotech Racing, who he previously drove for in the British Touring Car Championship.

== Racing career ==
=== Renault Clio Cup UK ===
Born in Coventry, Smith entered the Renault Clio Cup UK championship in 2008, competing in all but two events. He continued in 2009 with a best result of ninth in the final race of the season at Brands Hatch. In 2010, he competed in all races except the rounds at Knockhill, where he raced in the British Touring Car Championship instead. Smith returned to the Clio Cup at Silverstone where he scored his best finish of fourth, but did not race in the season finale at Brands Hatch, and finished the season eighth overall.

=== British Touring Car Championship ===
==== Triple 8 Race Engineering (2010) ====
Smith competed in three rounds of the British Touring Car Championship in 2010 at Knockhill, driving a Vauxhall Vectra for Uniq Racing with Triple Eight, where he finished 12th, 13th and tenth.

==== Eurotech Racing (2011–2013, 2015–) ====
In December 2010, Smith was confirmed as a driver for Eurotech Racing, under the Pirtek Racing banner, in 2011. He raced the entire 2011 British Touring Car Championship season for the team. At Oulton Park, he was fined £500, given a reprimand and an endorsement of three points on his racing licence for an incident which saw him collide with Tom Boardman in race one. He finished the season 18th in the Drivers Championship.

In 2012, Smith raced an NGTC Honda Civic for Pirtek Racing. He started on pole position for the reverse grid race at Donington Park but finished fifth having had a slow start and losing the lead before the first corner. He took his first podium finish in the series at Knockhill with a second place finish in race three. In the wet conditions of race three at Rockingham, he lost control of the back of his car on the high speed banking and spun into the concrete wall. He escaped unhurt but the car was severely damaged at the rear. His car was re–shelled before the next round at Silverstone.

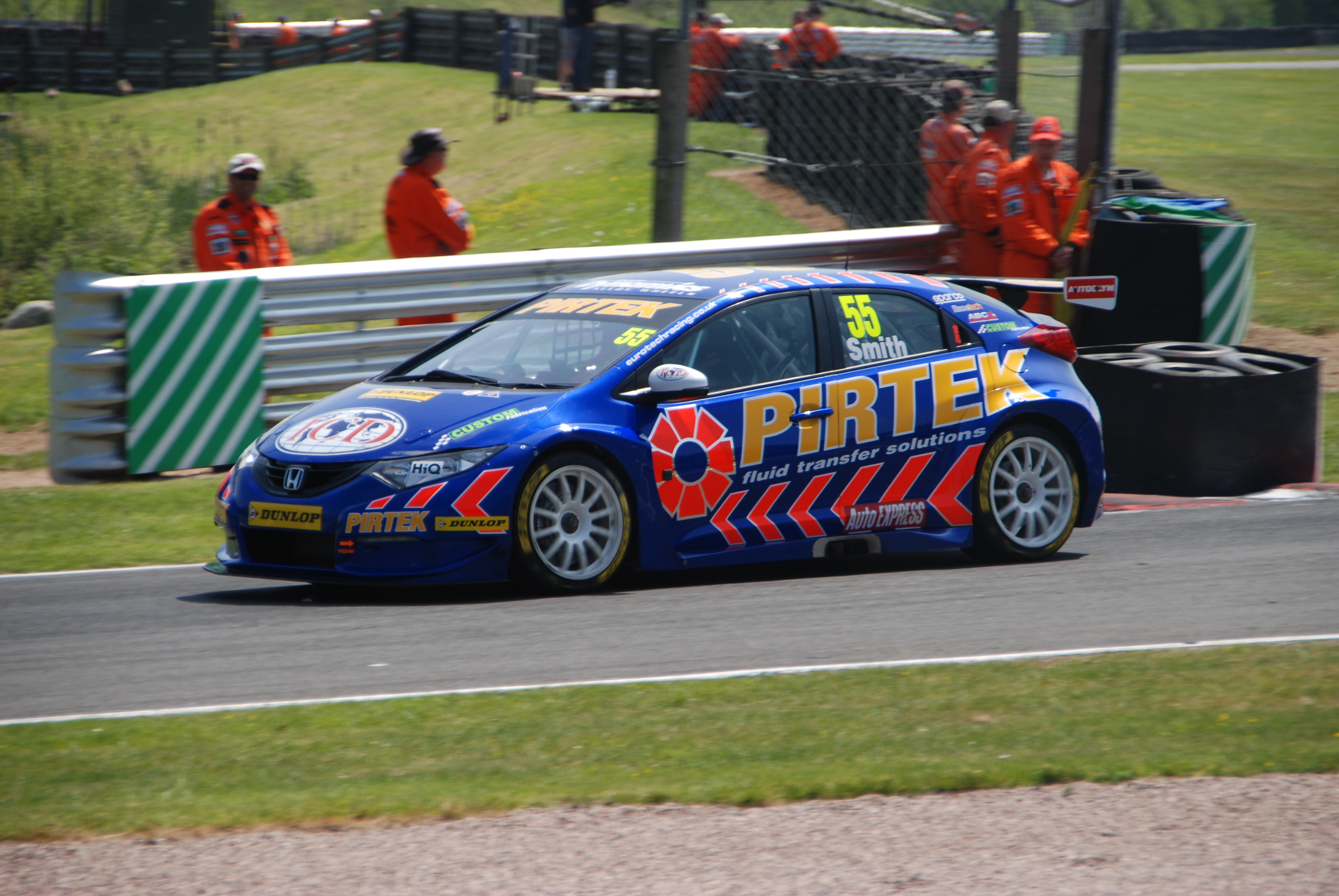
Smith driving the Pirtek Racing Honda Civic at Oulton Park during the 2013 British Touring Car Championship season.

He stayed with Pirtek Racing in 2013. He took a further podium finish at the season-opener at Brands Hatch, but slipped to fourteenth position in the championship after missing several races in the second half of the season.

Smith missed the 2014 season due to business commitments, but returned to the championship for 2015 by buying the Eurotech team, following the departure of lead driver Andrew Jordan and his father Mike as team principal. He is competing as an owner-driver alongside Martin Depper.

In the first race of the 2017 season, Smith took his maiden pole at the Brands Hatch Indy round, the opening round of the season, as qualifying was interrupted by rain and red flags. During qualifying at Croft Circuit, Smith was involved in a multiple car pile-up, causing chest and shoulder injuries, which put an end to his season. He was replaced for the rest of the season by his son, Brett Smith.

Ahead of the 2018 season, it was announced that due to the severity of Smith's shoulder injury, he would also miss the 2018 season, but was expected to make a full recovery.

=== Superstars Series ===
Smith joined the Superstars Series for the Circuit de Spa-Francorchamps round of the 2012 season, driving a Team Dinamic BMW M3 (E92). His best result of the weekend was seventh in race two, with both races having taken place in wet conditions.

=== British Endurance Championship ===
In 2013, it was announced Smith would be racing for BPM Racing in the British Endurance Championship in a Renault Megane V6 Trophy car.

== Personal life ==
Smith's son, Brett, is also a racing driver, currently competing in the BTCC with the family run Eurotech Racing team.

== Racing record ==
=== Complete British Touring Car Championship results ===
(key) (Races in bold indicate pole position – 1 point awarded just in first race; races in italics indicate fastest lap – 1 point awarded all races; * signifies that driver lead race for at least one lap – 1 point given all races)

Year	Team	Car	1	2	3	4	5	6	7	8	9	10	11	12	13	14	15	16	17	18	19	20	21	22	23	24	25	26	27	28	29	30	Pos	Pts
2010	Triple 8 Race Engineering	Vauxhall Vectra	THR; 1	THR; 2	THR; 3	ROC; 1	ROC; 2	ROC; 3	BRH; 1	BRH; 2	BRH; 3	OUL; 1	OUL; 2	OUL; 3	CRO; 1	CRO; 2	CRO; 3	SNE; 1	SNE; 2	SNE; 3	SIL; 1	SIL; 2	SIL; 3	KNO; 1; 14	KNO; 2; 15	KNO; 3; 14	DON; 1	DON; 2	DON; 3	BRH; 1	BRH; 2	BRH; 3	29th	0
2011	Pirtek Racing	Vauxhall Vectra	BRH; 1; 9	BRH; 2; 16	BRH; 3; 13	DON; 1; 10	DON; 2; 13	DON; 3; 5	THR; 1; 9	THR; 2; 12	THR; 3; 11	OUL; 1 Ret	OUL; 2 Ret	OUL; 3; 10	CRO; 1; 15	CRO; 2 Ret	CRO; 3; 14	SNE; 1; 11	SNE; 2; 16	SNE; 3; 17	KNO; 1; 16	KNO; 2; 18	KNO; 3; 14	ROC; 1; 14	ROC; 2; 8	ROC; 3; 7	BRH; 1 Ret	BRH; 2; 24	BRH; 3; 14	SIL; 1; 17	SIL; 2; 16	SIL; 3; 25	17th	19
2012	Pirtek Racing	Honda Civic	BRH; 1; 10	BRH; 2; 7	BRH; 3; 4	DON; 1; 13	DON; 2; 6	**DON**; **3**; 5	THR; 1; 13	THR; 2; 11	THR; 3; 9	OUL; 1 Ret	OUL; 2 DNS	OUL; 3; 12	CRO; 1 Ret	CRO; 2; 13	CRO; 3; 11	SNE; 1; 10	SNE; 2; 11	SNE; 3; 11	KNO; 1; 14	KNO; 2; 9	KNO; 3; 2	ROC; 1 Ret	ROC; 2; 13	ROC; 3 Ret	SIL; 1; 8	SIL; 2; 11	SIL; 3; 10	BRH; 1; 10	BRH; 2; 8	BRH; 3; 17	12th	157
2013	Pirtek Racing	Honda Civic	BRH; 1; 5	BRH; 2; 3	BRH; 3; 7	DON; 1; 10	DON; 2; 11	DON; 3; 10	THR; 1; 5	THR; 2; 6	THR; 3; 6*	OUL; 1; 11	OUL; 2; 10	**OUL**; **3**; 18*	CRO; 1; 12	CRO; 2; 10	CRO; 3; 10	SNE; 1; 13	SNE; 2 Ret	SNE; 3; 19	KNO; 1	KNO; 2	KNO; 3	ROC; 1; 12	ROC; 2; 10	ROC; 3; 10	SIL; 1; 18	SIL; 2 DNS	SIL; 3 DNS	BRH; 1	BRH; 2	BRH; 3	14th	132
2015	Eurotech Racing	Honda Civic	BRH; 1; 19	BRH; 2; 23	BRH; 3; 14	DON; 1; 14	DON; 2; 15	DON; 3; 13	THR; 1; 17	THR; 2; 20	THR; 3 Ret	OUL; 1; 19	OUL; 2; 10	OUL; 3; 10	CRO; 1; 26	CRO; 2; 24	CRO; 3; 14	SNE; 1; 26	SNE; 2; 18	SNE; 3; 18	KNO; 1; 12	KNO; 2 Ret	KNO; 3; 14	ROC; 1; 25	ROC; 2; 15	ROC; 3 Ret	SIL; 1; 16	SIL; 2; 16	SIL; 3 Ret	BRH; 1; 24	BRH; 2; 14	BRH; 3; 16	20th	31
2016	Eurotech Racing	Honda Civic Type R	BRH; 1; 14	BRH; 2; 10	BRH; 3; 7	DON; 1; 7	DON; 2; 18	DON; 3 Ret	THR; 1; 4	THR; 2; 25	THR; 3; 11	OUL; 1; 21	OUL; 2; 15	OUL; 3 Ret	CRO; 1; 20	CRO; 2; 18	CRO; 3; 18	SNE; 1 Ret	SNE; 2; 15	SNE; 3; 15	KNO; 1 Ret	KNO; 2; 15	KNO; 3 Ret	ROC; 1; 25	ROC; 2; 17	ROC; 3; 13	SIL; 1; 15	SIL; 2; 25	SIL; 3; 15	BRH; 1; 19	BRH; 2; 11	BRH; 3; 17	18th	55
2017	Eurotech Racing	Honda Civic Type R	**BRH**; **1** Ret	BRH; 2; 16	BRH; 3; 17	DON; 1; 9	DON; 2; 13	DON; 3 Ret	THR; 1; 11	THR; 2; 10	THR; 3; 27	OUL; 1; 13	OUL; 2; 21	OUL; 3; 24	CRO; 1 WD	CRO; 2 WD	CRO; 3 WD	SNE; 1	SNE; 2	SNE; 3	KNO; 1	KNO; 2	KNO; 3	ROC; 1	ROC; 2	ROC; 3	SIL; 1	SIL; 2	SIL; 3	BRH; 1	BRH; 2	BRH; 3	26th	25

=== Complete International Superstars Series results ===
(key)

Year	Team	Car	1	2	3	4	5	6	7	8	9	10	11	12	13	14	15	16	DC	Points
2012	Dinamic	BMW M3	MNZ; 1	MNZ; 2	IMO; 1	IMO; 2	DON; 1	DON; 2	MUG; 1	MUG; 2	HUN; 1	HUN; 2	SPA; 1; 13	SPA; 2; 7	VAL; 1	VAL; 2	PER; 1	PER; 2	31st	6

=== Complete British GT Championship results ===
(key)

Year	Team	Car	Class	1	2	3	4	5	6	7	8	9	10	DC	Points
2014	Oman Racing Team	Aston Martin V12 Vantage GT3	GT3	OUL; 1	OUL; 2	ROC; 1	SIL; 1	SNE; 1; 11	SNE; 2; 13	SPA; 1; 3	SPA; 2; 13	BRH; 1; 3	DON; 1	17th	37.5
