= Andrew Jordan (racing driver) =

British racing driver (born 1989)

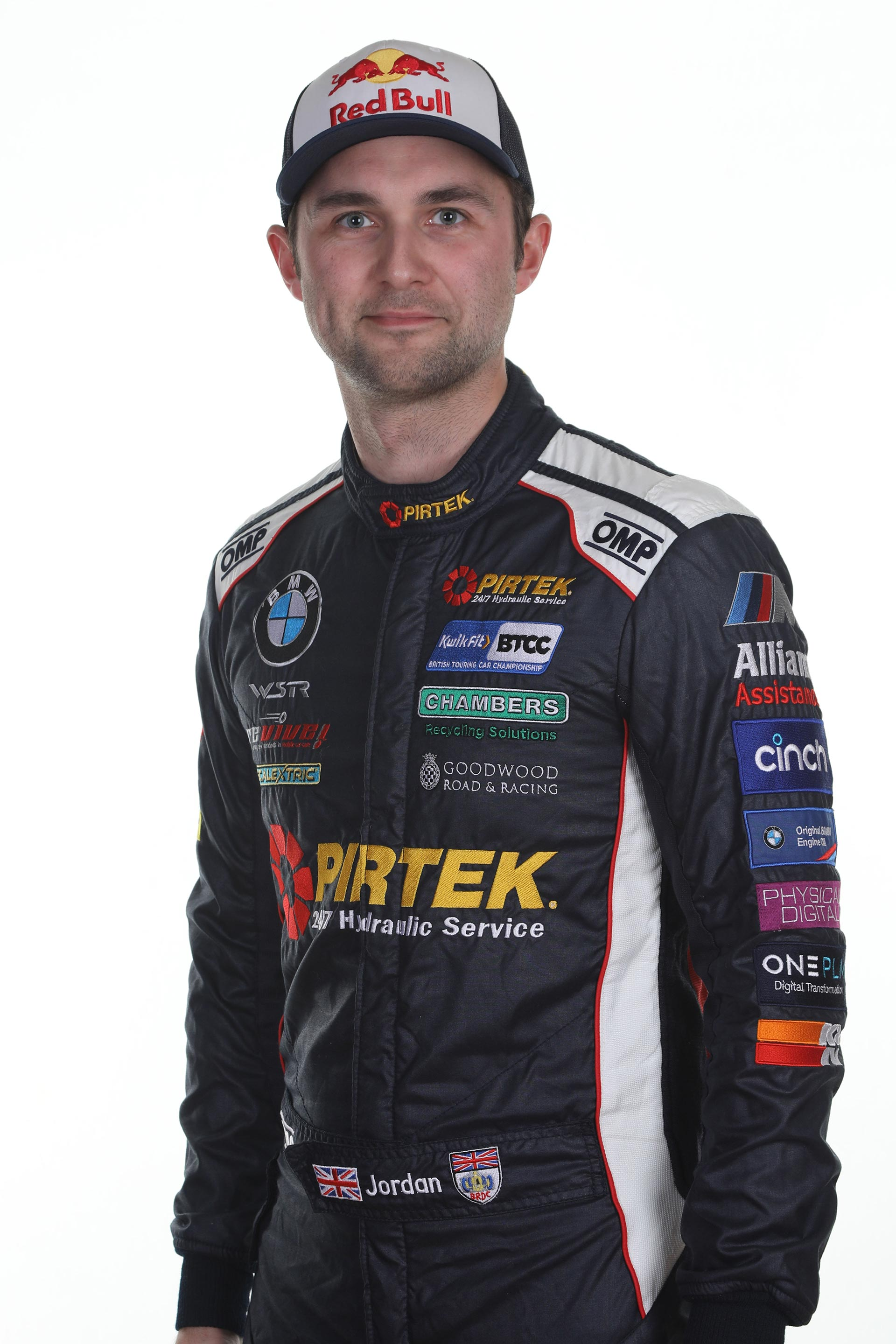
- Andrew Jordan
- Nationality: (United Kingdom) British
- Born: Andrew Phillip Jordan; 24 May 1989 (age 37) Sutton Coldfield, England
- Relatives: Mike Jordan (father)

British Touring Car Championship career
- Debut season: 2008
- Current team: TOCA / Cosworth / M-Sport
- Car number: 77
- Former teams: Eurotech Racing; Triple Eight Racing; Motorbase Performance; BMW Pirtek Racing
- Starts: 358
- Championships: 1 (2013)
- Wins: 26
- Podiums: 72
- Poles: 7
- Fastest laps: 20

FIA World Rallycross Championship
- Years active: 2014–2018
- Former teams: MJP Racing Team Austria; EKS RX; Team Peugeot-Hansen; Olsbergs MSE
- Starts: 5
- Wins: 0
- Podiums: 1
- Best finish: 19th in 2017

Previous series
- 2011 2007 2006 2005: British GT Championship; Renault Clio Cup UK; SEAT Cupra Championship; Ginetta Championship

Championship titles
- 2013 2012–13, 16 2005: BTCC; BTCC Independents' Trophy; Ginetta Winter Series

Awards
- 2013: Autosport National Driver of the Year

Andrew Phillip Jordan (born 24 May 1989 in Sutton Coldfield) is a British racing driver, who has driven in the British Touring Car Championship. He was the 2013 British Touring Car Champion.

== Racing career ==
=== Rallycross ===
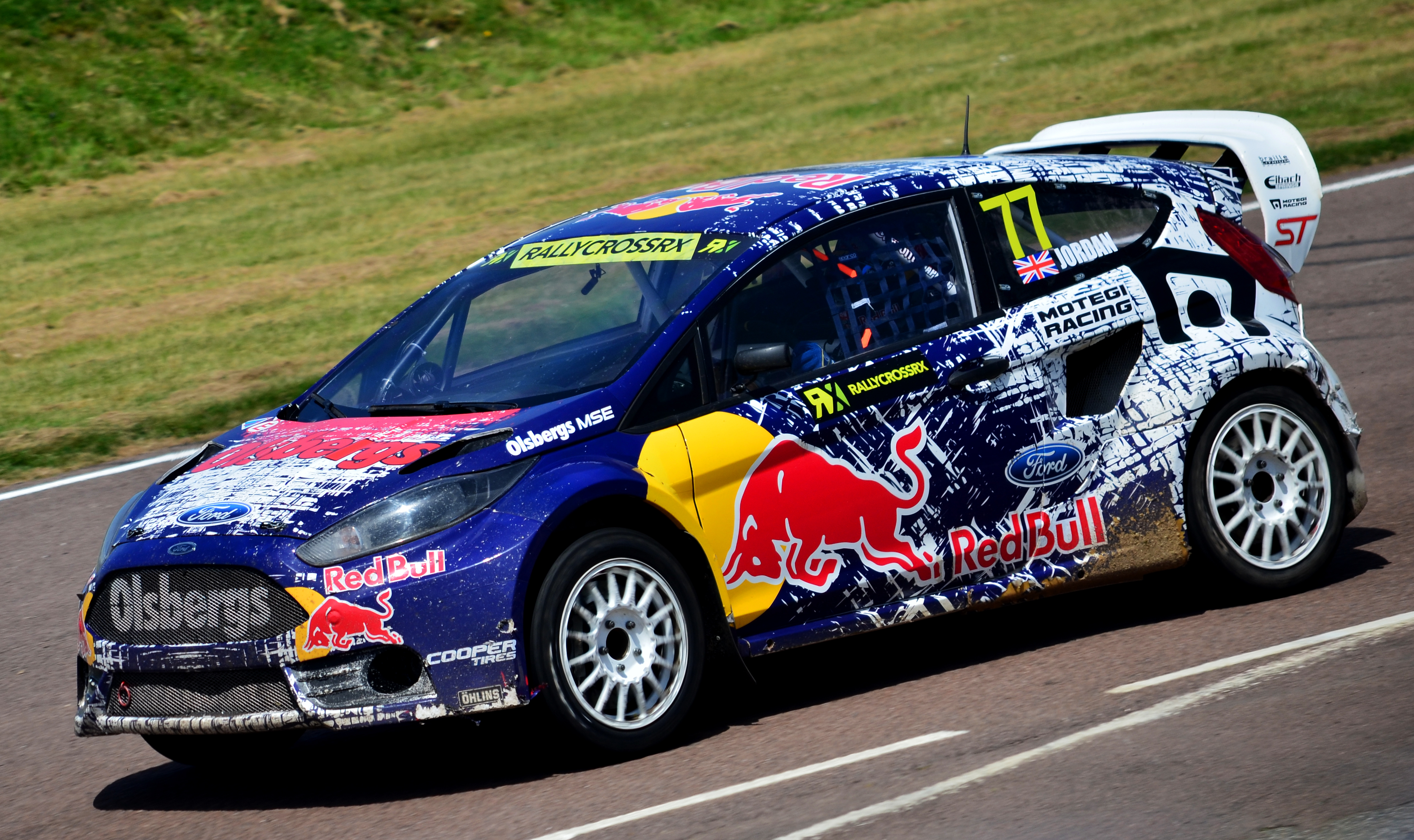
Jordan at the Lydden Hill round of the 2014 WRX season.

Jordan first started racing in rallycross. In 2003, he entered the Ford Rally Academy, and went on to win the Winter Junior Rallycross Championship. The next year, he was the BTRDA Junior Rallycross Champion, and won the title of best newcomer in the British Junior series. In 2005, he won four different titles, the Junior Rallycross title, the BTRDA Rallycross title, as well as the Super Series Junior and the Ginetta Winterseries titles. In 2006, Jordan was the youngest ever driver and race winner in the British Rallycross Supercar class, in a Team Eurotech Ford Focus. The protégé of 1992 European Rallycross Champion Will Gollop made it to runner-up in the 2007 British Rallycross Championship, claiming three wins.

Jordan made a one-off return to rallycross in 2014 when he competed with a Ford Fiesta ST Supercar of Olsbergs MSE in the second round of the FIA World Rallycross Championship at Lydden Hill, finishing in third place. In 2015, he participated in two more World RX rounds; in Great Britain, he raced a Peugeot 208 Supercar for Team Peugeot-Hansen, and in Italy, an Audi S1 Supercar for EKS RX.

=== Renault Clio Cup ===
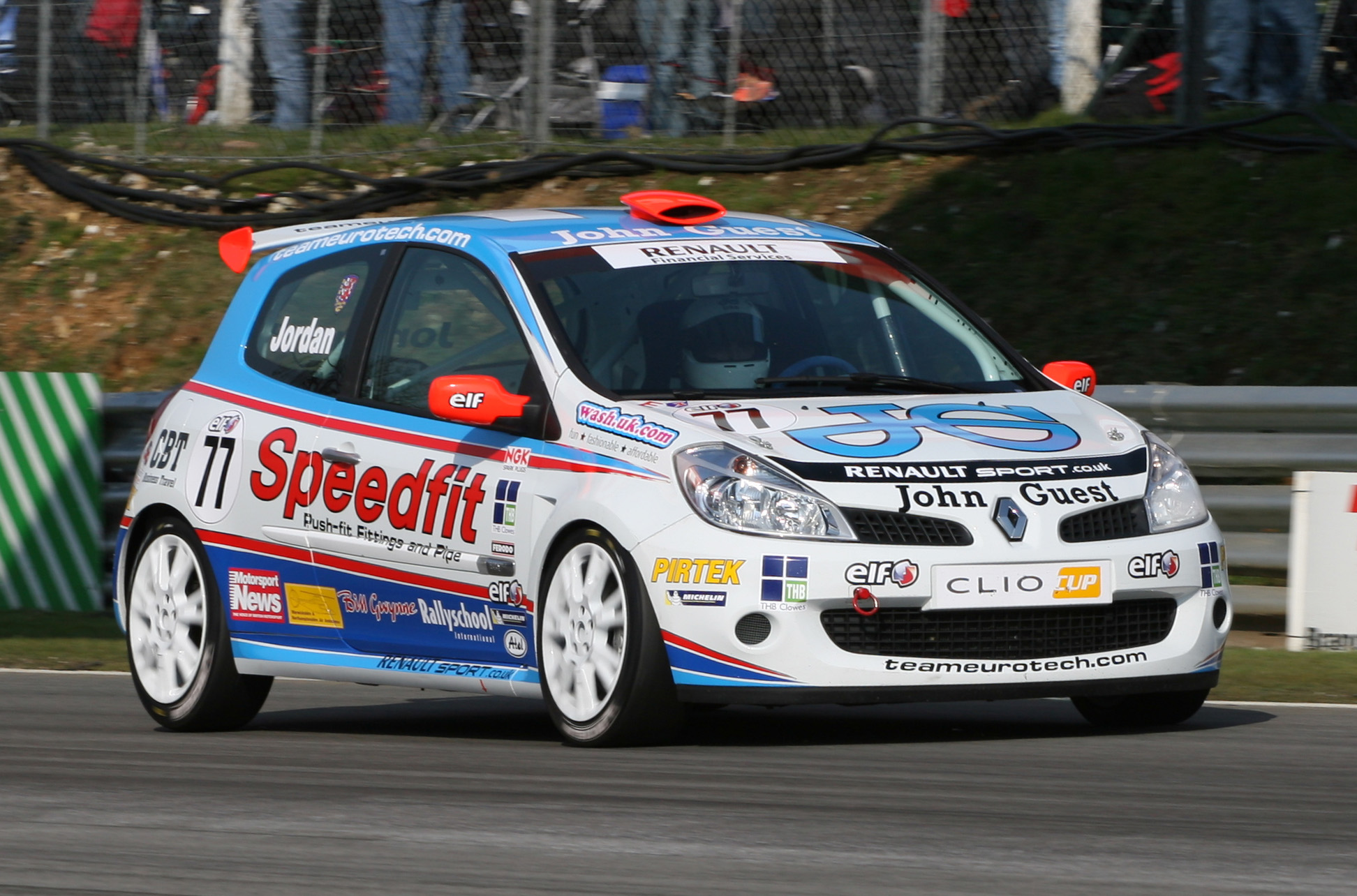
Jordan competing in the 2007 Clio Cup UK season.

After driving some races in the 2006 SEAT Cupra Championship, Jordan raced in the 2007 Renault Clio Cup, which supports the British Touring Car Championship. Driving for his father's team, he finished twelfth in the championship with a best result of second, coming in the opening round at Brands Hatch.

=== British Touring Car Championship ===
==== Eurotech Racing (2008) ====
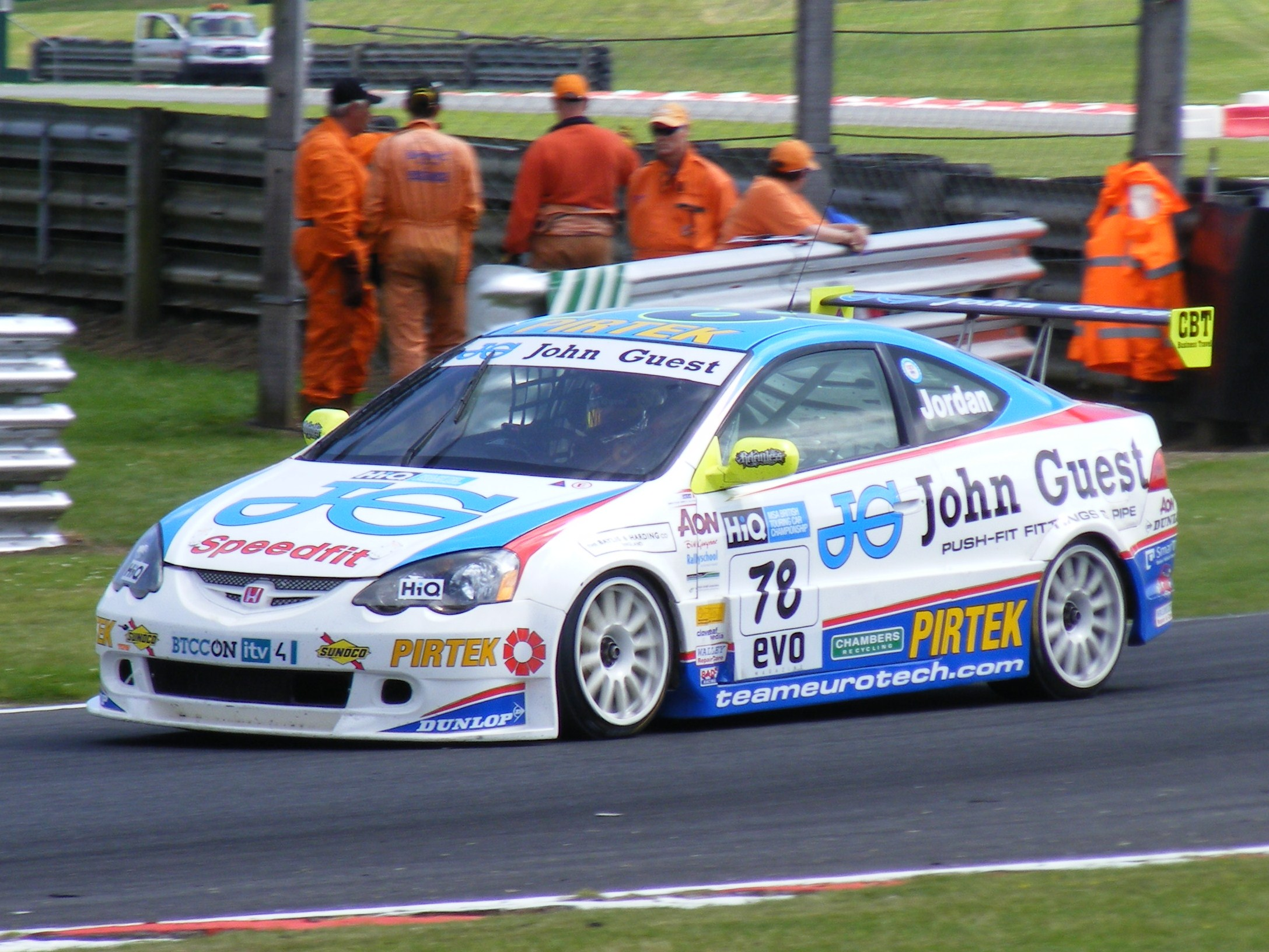
Jordan competing in the 2008 British Touring Car Championship.

In 2008, it was announced that Jordan would join his father Mike Jordan (himself an experienced touring car and sportscar driver) as part of a two car Team Eurotech in the British Touring Car Championship. This was the first time a father and son would drive together in series history and both drove ex-Team Dynamics Honda Integras. The teenager's first season was a successful one, despite some reliability problems from his ageing but competitive Integra. This included two podiums, at Oulton Park and Knockhill. He finished the season in thirteenth place, one place ahead of his father.

==== VX Racing (2009) ====
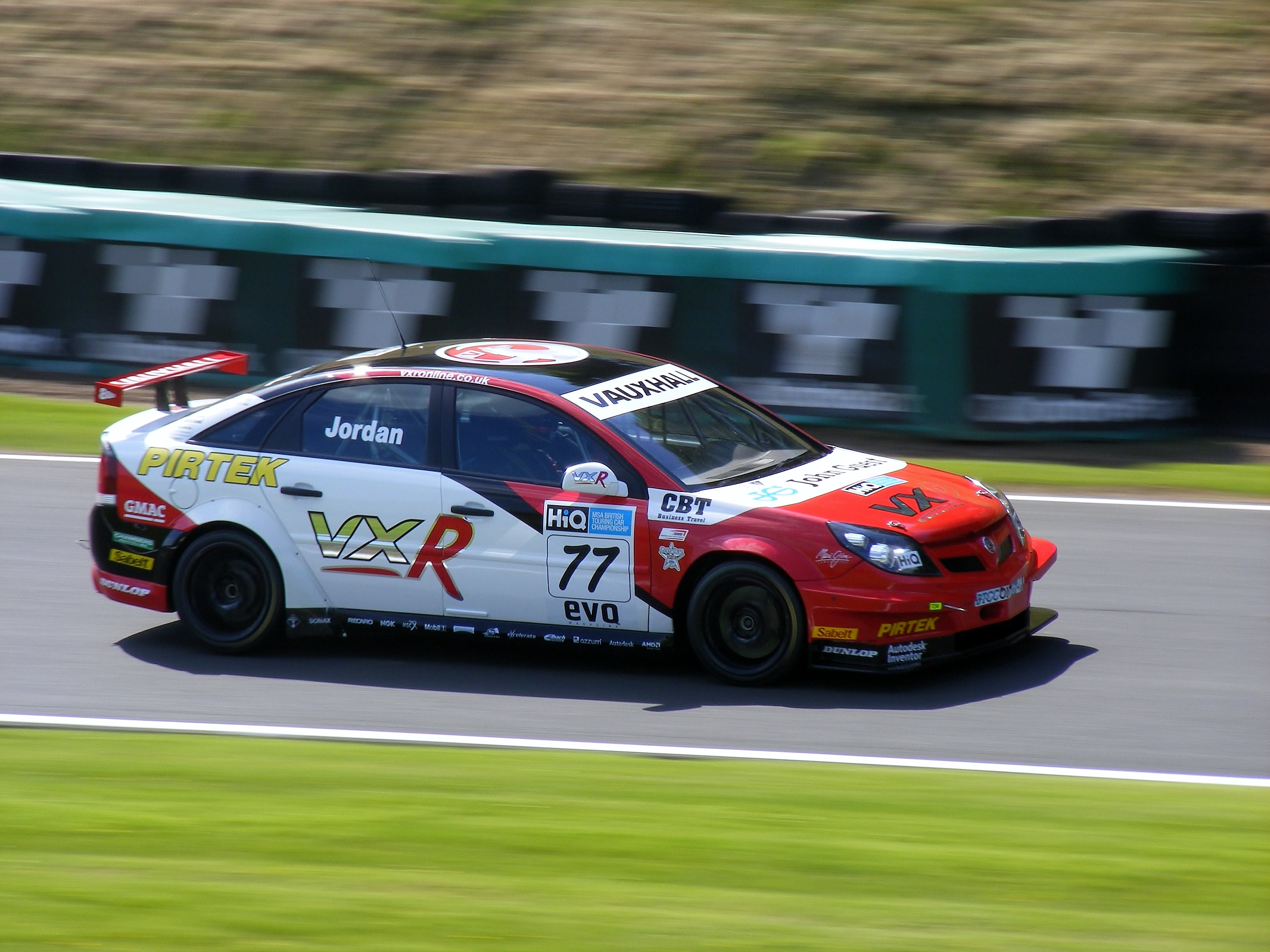
Jordan competing in the fourth event of the 2009 BTCC season at Oulton Park.

For 2009, it was announced that Jordan would continue in the BTCC in a Vauxhall Vectra for the works Vauxhall team alongside Fabrizio Giovanardi and Matt Neal. Jordan scored his first pole position at the third round of the season at Donington Park, becoming the youngest driver to do so in BTCC history. He held this record until Alex MacDowall took pole position at Snetterton the following season. Having achieved a best result of second on three occasions, he finished the season tenth in the drivers standings behind his teammates. Vauxhall withdrew from the BTCC as a works team at the end of the season.

==== Pirtek Racing (2010–2014) ====
In 2010, Jordan rejoined his family-run team now under the Pirtek Racing banner, running a Vectra with a turbo engine prepared by TOCA to the NGTC regulations which would power all the cars from 2011 onwards. He scored his first series win in the third race of round five at Croft, having started from pole due to the reverse grid system. At Snetterton, Jordan was hampered by an engine failure which prevented him from starting the final race of the weekend. He took a second win in the final race of the season at Brands Hatch, again a reversed grid race.

In 2011, Pirtek Racing expanded to two cars to run Jordan and Jeff Smith Jordan only scored points in one race at Brands Hatch but he followed this with a string of five consecutive podiums, including a race win at Donington Park. Results were average for the rest of the season apart from two further podiums. He finished sixth in the Drivers Championship and third in the Independents' Trophy.

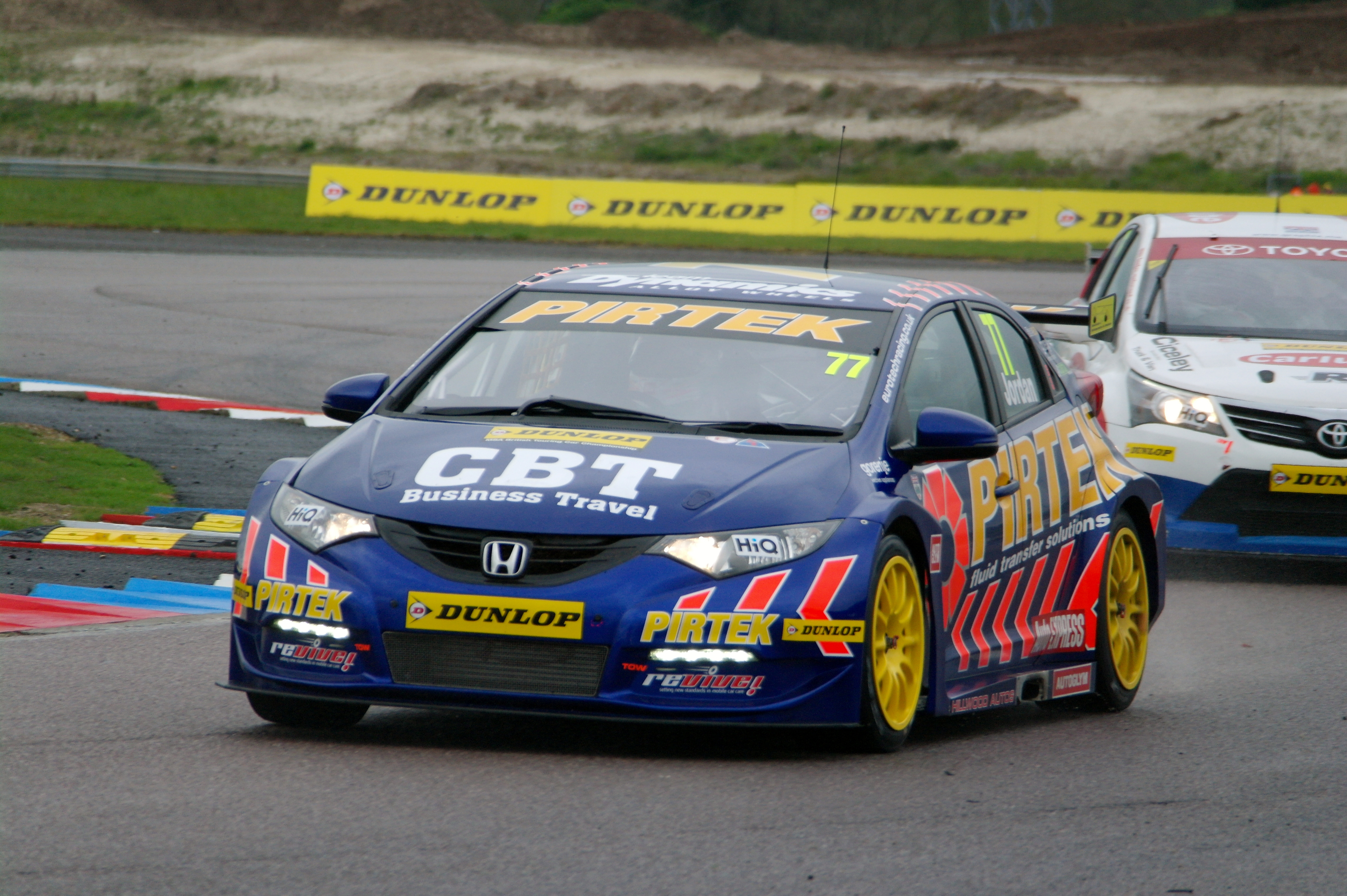
Jordan driving for Pirtek Racing at Thruxton in the 2012 BTCC season.

In 2012, Pirtek Racing ran two Team Dynamics prepared NGTC Honda Civics. Jordan took pole position for the third round of the championship at Thruxton but retired at the start of the first race having spun out at the first corner in the wet conditions.

Jordan stayed with the team in 2013. He took pole position for the opening round of the season at Brands Hatch after deteriorating track conditions due to a snow shower prevented drivers from improving their times. He finished second in the first race behind Jason Plato having collided with the MG driver at the final corner while attempting to take the lead of the race. Jordan won the 2013 BTCC at the final round at Brands Hatch GP circuit on 13 October 2013.

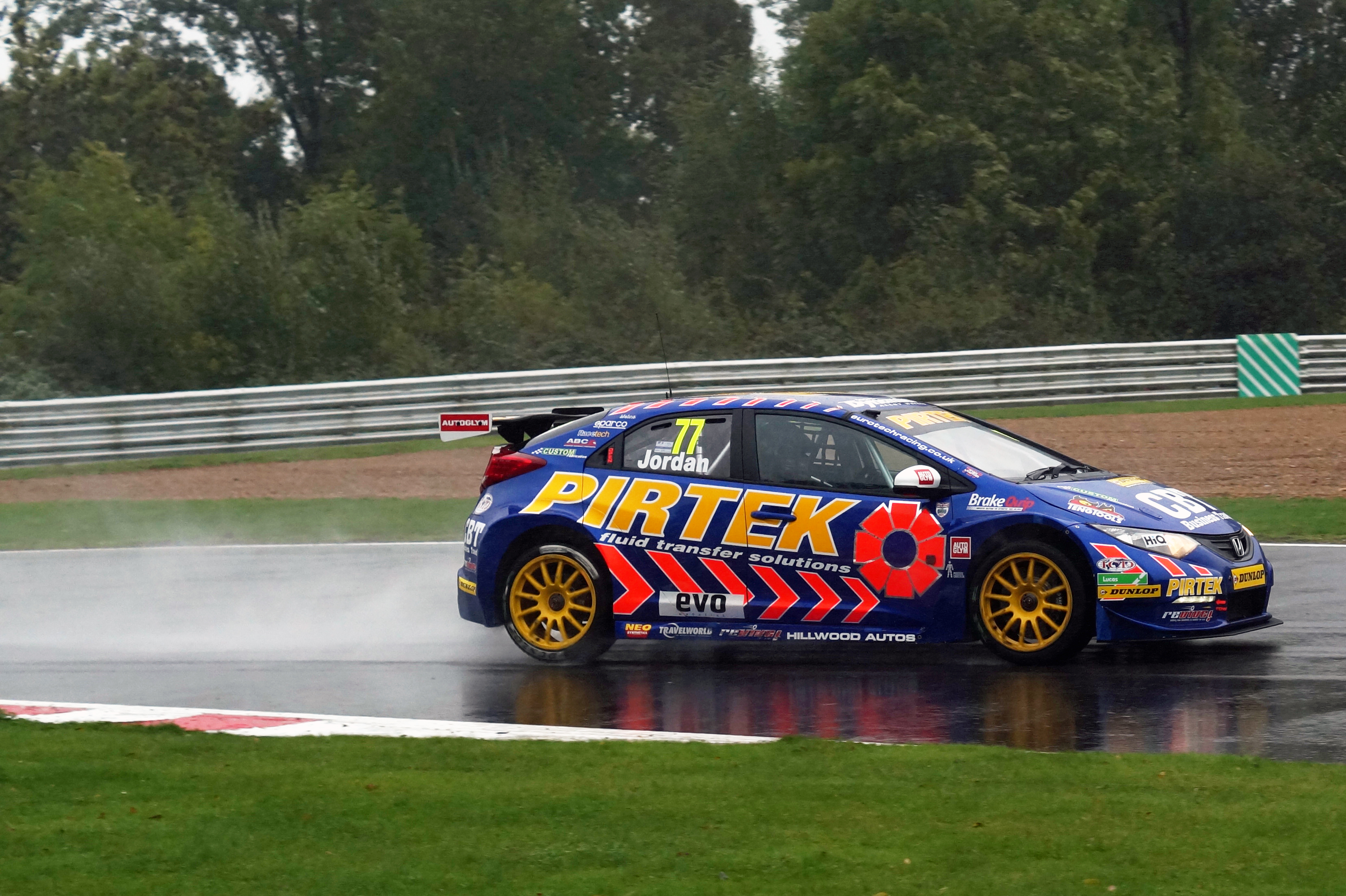
Jordan at Brands Hatch in 2013, the day he claimed that years title

In what turned out to be his final season for Pirtek Racing, Jordan won four races, including the first two races of the season at Brands Hatch, getting two pole positions and four fastest race laps on the way. He also set the fastest ever BTCC lap around Thruxton in qualifying, finishing the lap in 1 minute 16.192 seconds, averaging 111.31 mph. He finished fifth in the championship with 310 points, only six less than fourth-placed Mat Jackson. His championship challenge was effectively ended after a desperately poor weekend at Snetterton, finishing 16th and 15th, and not even starting the third race of the weekend. His poor run briefly continued at Knockhill, where he retired from the first race, but recovered to finish 11th and fifth in the other two races of the weekend. He also finished third in the competition for the Independent's Trophy, only 88 points behind the winner Colin Turkington, and tenth in the Jack Sears Trophy, 40 points off eventual winner Dave Newsham.

In 2014, Jordan also briefly entered into the FIA World Rallycross Championship, competing in the British round of the series.

==== Triple Eight Racing (2015) ====
Jordan left Eurotech after the 2014 season to join the works MG team, run by Triple Eight Racing, maintaining his Pirtek sponsorship. He had previously driven for the team in 2009 when they ran the Vauxhall BTCC factory programme. It was to be a lean year however with only five podiums to his name. This meant he finished fifth in the standings.

==== Motorbase Performance (2016) ====
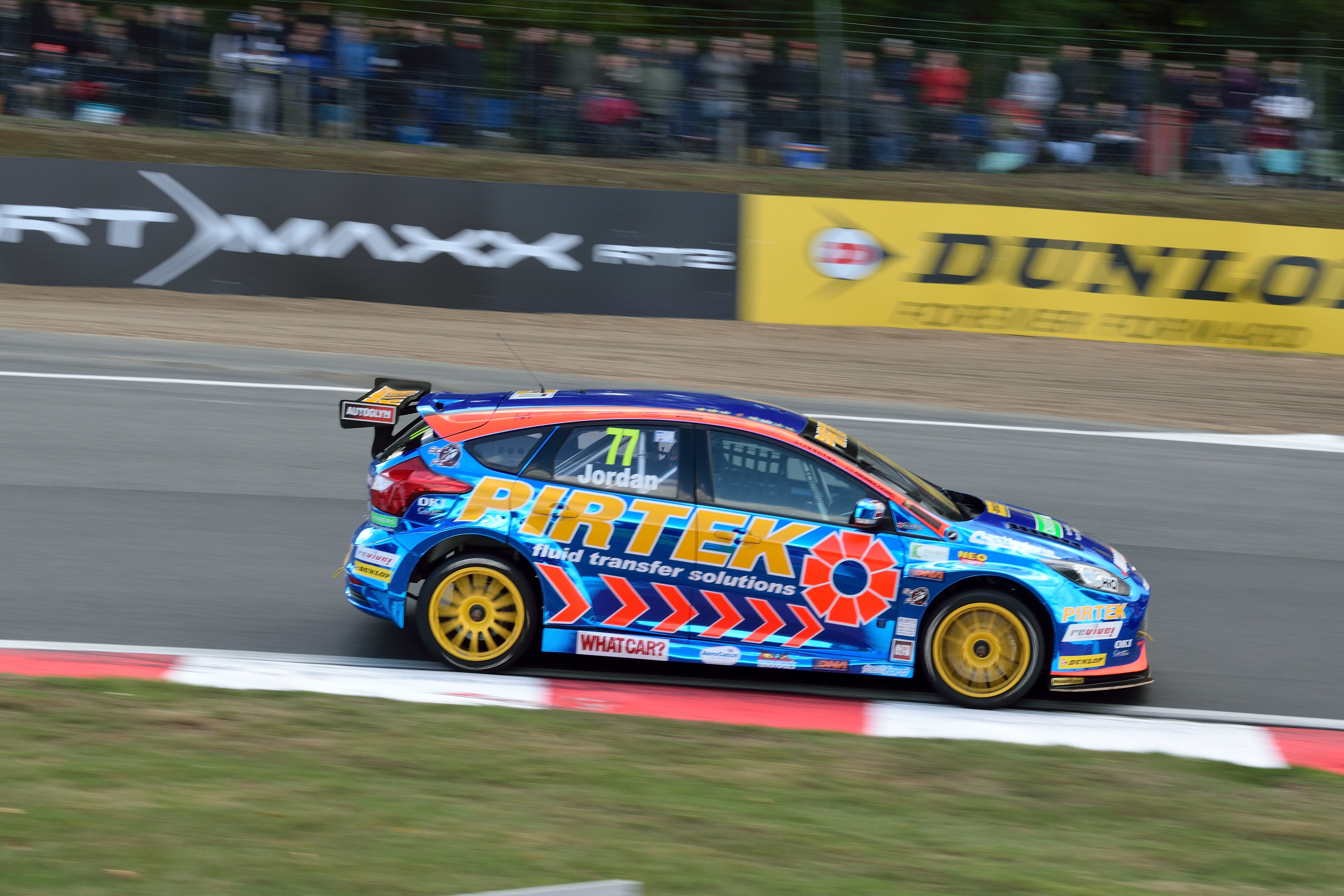
Jordan racing at Brands Hatch in 2016

In October 2015, Jordan announced he would be moving to Motorbase for the 2016 season driving their Ford Focus ST, again taking his Pirtek sponsorship with him. He took his first win in 16 months at Thruxton and won again at Silverstone. He ranked eighth at the end of the year also winning the independents championship for a third time.

==== West Surrey Racing (2017–2019) ====
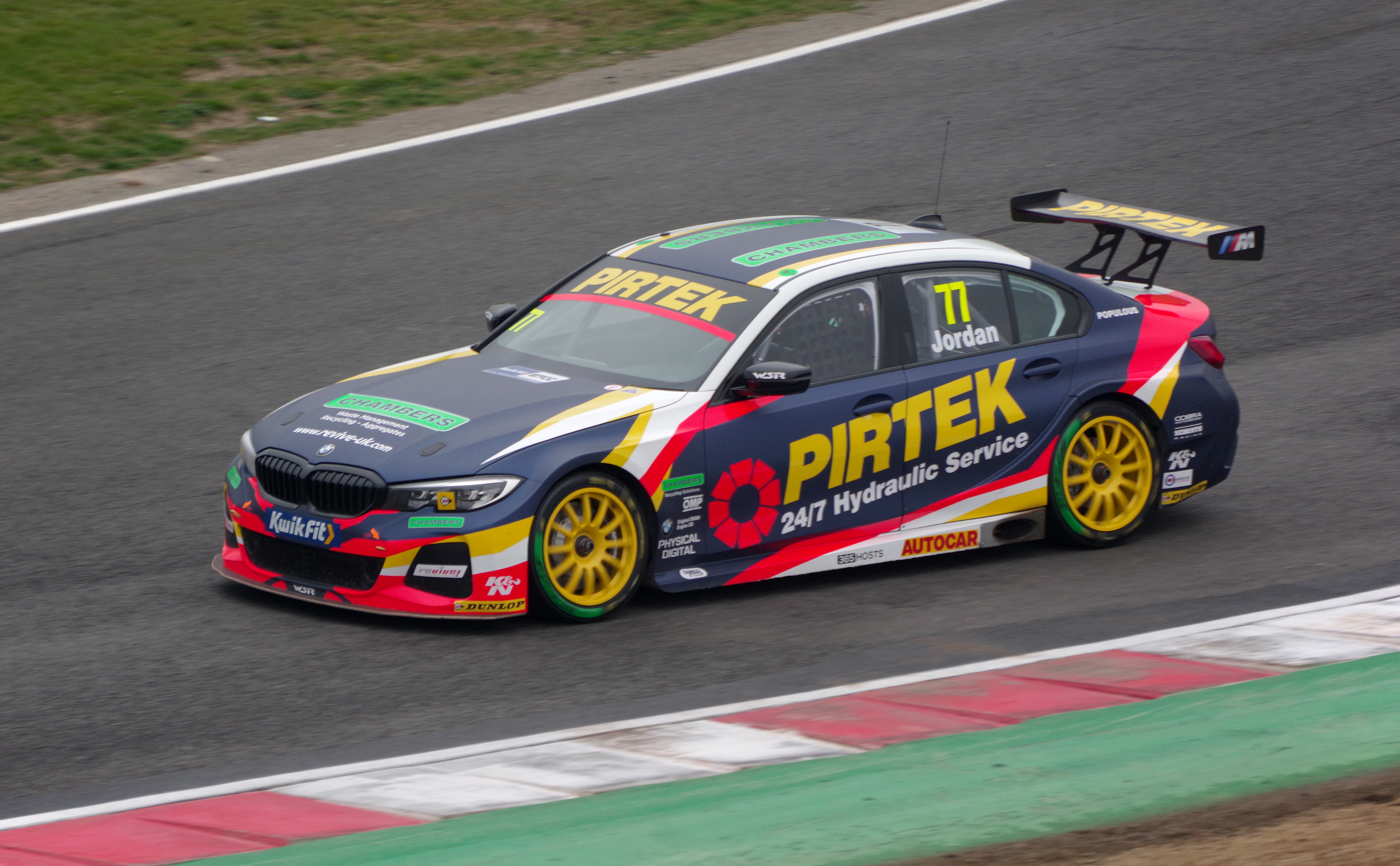
Jordan driving for BMW at Brands Hatch during the 2019 British Touring Car Championship season.

In November 2016, Jordan joined the works BMW team, run by West Surrey Racing, on a two-year deal driving the 125i M Sport, once more taking his Pirtek sponsorship.

=== Other activities ===
In 2011, Jordan contested a one-off race meeting for Team-LNT in the opening round of the British GT Championship season at Oulton Park, driving a Ginetta G55 GT3. He finished 15th in class in the first race and retired from the second race.

Jordan was also entered for the Shannons Supercar Showdown television program in Australia, created by V8 Supercars team Kelly Racing with the aim to get one of ten drivers onto the grid of the 2011 Bathurst 1000 alongside Grant Denyer. Jordan finished runner-up to local Formula Ford driver Cam Waters.

At the final round of the 2017 Pickup Truck Racing Championship, Jordan made a one-off appearance. An impressive performance saw Jordan take the victory in the second race of the day.

== Racing record ==
=== Complete British Touring Car Championship results ===
(key) (Races in bold indicate pole position – 1 point awarded in first race) (Races in italics indicate fastest lap – 1 point awarded all races) (* signifies that driver lead race for at least one lap – 1 point given all races)

Year	Team	Car	1	2	3	4	5	6	7	8	9	10	11	12	13	14	15	16	17	18	19	20	21	22	23	24	25	26	27	28	29	30	Pos	Points
2008	John Guest Racing	Honda Integra Type-R	BRH; 1; 15	BRH; 2; 14	BRH; 3; 9	ROC; 1 Ret	ROC; 2 Ret	ROC; 3 Ret	DON; 1; 5	DON; 2; 6	DON; 3 Ret	THR; 1; 10	THR; 2; 9	**THR**; **3** Ret	CRO; 1; 10	CRO; 2 Ret	CRO; 3; 10	SNE; 1 Ret	SNE; 2 Ret	SNE; 3 Ret	OUL; 1; 13	OUL; 2; 9	**OUL**; **3**; 3*	KNO; 1; 9	KNO; 2; 9	**KNO**; **3**; 3	SIL; 1; 9	SIL; 2 Ret	SIL; 3; 20	BRH; 1; 10	BRH; 2; 7	BRH; 3; 7	13th	56
2009	VX Racing	Vauxhall Vectra	BRH; 1 Ret	BRH; 2; 5	BRH; 3 Ret	THR; 1; 3	THR; 2; 18	THR; 3; 16	**DON**; **1**; 2	DON; 2 Ret	DON; 3; 11	OUL; 1; 10	OUL; 2; 6	OUL; 3; 2	CRO; 1; 8	CRO; 2; 7	CRO; 3; 4	SNE; 1; 12*	SNE; 2; 12	SNE; 3; 4	KNO; 1; 7	KNO; 2; 10	KNO; 3; 7	SIL; 1; 12	SIL; 2; 6	SIL; 3; 15	ROC; 1; 7	ROC; 2; 8	ROC; 3; 2*	BRH; 1; 4	BRH; 2; 16	BRH; 3 Ret	10th	114
2010	Pirtek Racing	Vauxhall Vectra	THR; 1; 14	THR; 2; 15	THR; 3; 14	ROC; 1; 7	ROC; 2; 5	ROC; 3; 4	BRH; 1 Ret	BRH; 2; 5	BRH; 3; 5	OUL; 1 Ret	OUL; 2; 16	OUL; 3 Ret	CRO; 1; 10	CRO; 2; 7	**CRO**; **3**; 1*	SNE; 1; 9	SNE; 2; 6	SNE; 3 Ret	SIL; 1; 5	SIL; 2; 18	SIL; 3 Ret	KNO; 1; 9	KNO; 2; 8	KNO; 3; 8	DON; 1 Ret	DON; 2; 9	**DON**; **3**; 7*	BRH; 1; 9	BRH; 2; 7	**BRH**; **3**; 1*	10th	101
2011	Pirtek Racing	Vauxhall Vectra	BRH; 1; 16	BRH; 2; 6	BRH; 3; 20	DON; 1; 2	DON; 2; 1*	DON; 3; 2	THR; 1; 3	THR; 2; 3	THR; 3; 7	OUL; 1; 10	OUL; 2; 4	OUL; 3; 3	CRO; 1; 6	CRO; 2; 3	CRO; 3; 4	SNE; 1; 12	SNE; 2; 9	SNE; 3; 14	KNO; 1; 9	KNO; 2; 9	KNO; 3; 7	ROC; 1 Ret	ROC; 2; 13	ROC; 3; 8	BRH; 1 DNS	BRH; 2; 16	BRH; 3; 8	SIL; 1; 7	SIL; 2; 5	SIL; 3; 5	6th	143
2012	Pirtek Racing	Honda Civic	BRH; 1; 6	BRH; 2; 2	BRH; 3; 2*	DON; 1; 6	DON; 2; 5	DON; 3; 6	**THR**; **1** Ret	THR; 2; 10	THR; 3; 5	OUL; 1; 2	OUL; 2; 2	OUL; 3 Ret	CRO; 1; 4	CRO; 2; 4	CRO; 3; 3	SNE; 1; 3	SNE; 2; 1*	SNE; 3; 5	KNO; 1; 9	KNO; 2; 7	KNO; 3; 4	ROC; 1; 2	ROC; 2; 7*	ROC; 3; 4	SIL; 1 Ret	SIL; 2; 9	SIL; 3; 7	BRH; 1; 2	BRH; 2; 4	BRH; 3; 4	4th	346
2013	Pirtek Racing	Honda Civic	**BRH**; **1**; 2	BRH; 2; 2	BRH; 3; 6	DON; 1; 2	DON; 2; 1*	DON; 3; 13	**THR**; **1**; 11*	THR; 2; 4	THR; 3; 3	OUL; 1; 4	OUL; 2; 5	OUL; 3; 1*	CRO; 1; 6	CRO; 2; 5	CRO; 3; 3	SNE; 1; 5	SNE; 2; 1*	SNE; 3; 7	KNO; 1; 8	KNO; 2; 6	**KNO**; **3**; 1*	ROC; 1; 1*	**ROC**; **2**; 8	**ROC**; **3**; 1*	SIL; 1; 6	SIL; 2; 2*	SIL; 3; 5	BRH; 1; 5	BRH; 2 Ret	BRH; 3; 9	1st	396
2014	Pirtek Racing	Honda Civic	**BRH**; **1**; 1*	**BRH**; **2**; 1*	BRH; 3; 13	DON; 1; 3	DON; 2; 4	DON; 3; 5	**THR**; **1**; 1*	**THR**; **2**; 2*	THR; 3; 4	OUL; 1; 15	OUL; 2; 11	OUL; 3; 8	CRO; 1; 6	CRO; 2; 4	CRO; 3; 1*	SNE; 1; 16	SNE; 2; 15	SNE; 3 DNS	KNO; 1 Ret	KNO; 2; 11	KNO; 3; 5	ROC; 1; 6	ROC; 2; 4	ROC; 3; 3	SIL; 1; 10	SIL; 2; 8	SIL; 3; 6	BRH; 1; 9	BRH; 2; 4	BRH; 3; 6	5th	310
2015	MG Pirtek Racing	MG 6 GT	BRH; 1; 7	BRH; 2; 5	BRH; 3; 19	DON; 1; 4	DON; 2; 4	DON; 3; 2	THR; 1; 6	THR; 2; 7	THR; 3; 2	OUL; 1; 4	OUL; 2; 3	OUL; 3; 2	CRO; 1; 6	CRO; 2; 14	CRO; 3 Ret	SNE; 1; 4	SNE; 2; 7	SNE; 3; 5	KNO; 1; 8	KNO; 2; 4	KNO; 3; 7	ROC; 1; 6	ROC; 2; 12	ROC; 3; 9	SIL; 1; 2	SIL; 2; 19	SIL; 3; 12	BRH; 1; 19	BRH; 2; 11	BRH; 3; 8	5th	274
2016	Pirtek Racing	Ford Focus ST	BRH; 1; 11	BRH; 2; 4	BRH; 3; 4	DON; 1; 14	DON; 2; 12	DON; 3; 10	THR; 1; 3	THR; 2; 1*	THR; 3; 21	OUL; 1; 10	OUL; 2; 8	OUL; 3; 8	CRO; 1; 5	CRO; 2; 9	CRO; 3; 5	SNE; 1; 14	SNE; 2; 14	SNE; 3; 5	KNO; 1; 6	KNO; 2; 8	KNO; 3; 9	ROC; 1; 7	ROC; 2; 2	ROC; 3; 12	SIL; 1; 2	SIL; 2; 1*	SIL; 3; 8	BRH; 1 Ret	BRH; 2; 13	BRH; 3; 11	8th	255
2017	BMW Pirtek Racing	BMW 125i M Sport	BRH; 1; 6	BRH; 2; 6	BRH; 3; 1*	DON; 1; 15	DON; 2; 15	DON; 3; 18	THR; 1; 28	THR; 2; 14	THR; 3; 13	OUL; 1; 1*	**OUL**; **2**; 5*	OUL; 3; 3*	CRO; 1; 6	CRO; 2; 5	CRO; 3; 7	SNE; 1; 4	SNE; 2; 6	SNE; 3; 21*	KNO; 1; 13	KNO; 2 Ret	KNO; 3; 13	ROC; 1; 12	ROC; 2; 7	**ROC**; **3**; 1*	SIL; 1 Ret	SIL; 2; 27	SIL; 3; 8	BRH; 1; 27	BRH; 2; 17	BRH; 3; 13	9th	203
2018	BMW Pirtek Racing	BMW 125i M Sport	BRH; 1; 3	BRH; 2; 21*	BRH; 3; 17	DON; 1; 21	DON; 2; 18	DON; 3; 5	THR; 1; 6	THR; 2; 5	THR; 3 DNS	OUL; 1; 3	OUL; 2; 4	OUL; 3; 2	CRO; 1; 10	CRO; 2; 5	CRO; 3; 6	SNE; 1; 12	SNE; 2; 9	SNE; 3; 4	ROC; 1; 15	ROC; 2; 13	ROC; 3 Ret	KNO; 1; 4	KNO; 2; 1*	KNO; 3; 3	SIL; 1 Ret	SIL; 2; 22	SIL; 3; 9	BRH; 1; 8	BRH; 2; 3	BRH; 3; 9	5th	247
2019	BMW Pirtek Racing	BMW 330i M Sport	BRH; 1; 15	BRH; 2; 1*	BRH; 3; 24	DON; 1 Ret	DON; 2 DNS	DON; 3 DNS	THR; 1; 1*	**THR**; **2**; 1*	THR; 3; 17	**CRO**; **1**; 1*	**CRO**; **2**; 1*	CRO; 3; 8	OUL; 1; 3	OUL; 2; 2	OUL; 3; 4	SNE; 1; 5	SNE; 2; 3	SNE; 3; 5	THR; 1; 12	THR; 2; 7	THR; 3; 10	KNO; 1; 2*	KNO; 2; 1*	KNO; 3 Ret	SIL; 1; 10	SIL; 2; 8	SIL; 3; 8	BRH; 1; 8	BRH; 2; 2	BRH; 3; 4	2nd	318
2021	TOCA / Cosworth / M-Sport	Toyota Corolla GR Hybrid	THR; 1	THR; 2	THR; 3	SNE; 1	SNE; 2	SNE; 3	BRH; 1	BRH; 2	BRH; 3	OUL; 1	OUL; 2	OUL; 3	KNO; 1	KNO; 2	KNO; 3	THR; 1	THR; 2	THR; 3	CRO; 1	CRO; 2	CRO; 3	SIL; 1; 25‡	SIL; 2; 20‡	SIL; 3 Ret‡	DON; 1	DON; 2	DON; 3	BRH; 1	BRH; 2	BRH; 3	NC‡	0

‡ Hybrid Test Entry – not eligible for points

=== Complete British GT Championship results ===
(key) (Races in bold indicate pole position in class) (Races in italics indicate fastest lap in class)

Year	Team	Car	Class	1	2	3	4	5	6	7	8	9	10	DC	Pts
2011	Century Motorsport	Ginetta G55	GT3	OUL; 1; 17	OUL; 2 Ret	SNE; 1	BRH; 1	SPA; 1	SPA; 2	ROC; 1	ROC; 2	DON; 1		31st	0
2011	Rollcentre Racing	Ginetta G55	GT3										SIL; 1 Ret	31st	0

=== Complete FIA European Rallycross Championship results ===
==== Supercar ====
Year	Entrant	Car	1	2	3	4	5	ERX	Points	Ref
2014	Olsbergs MSE	Ford Fiesta ST	GBR; 4	NOR	BEL	GER	ITA	19th	13	

=== Complete FIA World Rallycross Championship results ===
==== Supercar ====
Year	Entrant	Car	1	2	3	4	5	6	7	8	9	10	11	12	13	WRX	Points
2014	Olsbergs MSE	Ford Fiesta ST	POR	GBR; 3	NOR	FIN	SWE	BEL	CAN	FRA	GER	ITA	TUR	ARG		25th	17
2015	Team Peugeot-Hansen	Peugeot 208 WRX	POR	HOC	BEL	GBR; 7	GER	SWE	CAN	NOR	FRA	BAR	TUR			24th	13
2015	EKS RX	Audi S1												ITA; 21	ARG	24th	13
2017	MJP Racing Team Austria	Ford Fiesta	BAR	POR	HOC	BEL	GBR; 8	NOR	SWE	CAN	FRA	LAT	GER	RSA		19th	11
2018	MJP Racing Team Austria	Ford Fiesta	BAR	POR	BEL	GBR; 20	NOR	SWE	CAN	FRA; 15	LAT	USA	GER	RSA		23rd	2

Sporting positions
Preceded by Gordon Shedden	British Touring Car Championship; Champion; 2013	Succeeded by Colin Turkington
Awards and achievements
Preceded by Gordon Shedden	Autosport Awards; National Driver of the Year; 2013	Succeeded by Colin Turkington
