= Brett Smith (racing driver) =

British racing driver (born 1992)

- Nationality: British
- Born: 11 May 1992 (age 34) Kettering, England
- Relatives: Jeff Smith (father)

British Touring Car Championship career
- Debut season: 2017
- Current team: WIX Racing with Eurotech
- Car number: 39
- Starts: 45
- Wins: 0
- Podiums: 1
- Poles: 1
- Fastest laps: 1
- Best finish: 20th in 2018

Previous series
- 2016-17 2015: Mini Challenge UK; Renault UK Clio Cup

Championship titles
- 2017: Mini Challenge UK

Brett Smith (born 11 May 1992) is a British racing driver currently competing in the Mini Challenge UK and the British Touring Car Championship for Eurotech Racing.

== British Touring Car Championship ==
Smith joined the series from the Snetterton round in July replacing his father, Jeff who was injured in a crash during the qualifying session for the previous round at Croft.

== Racing record ==
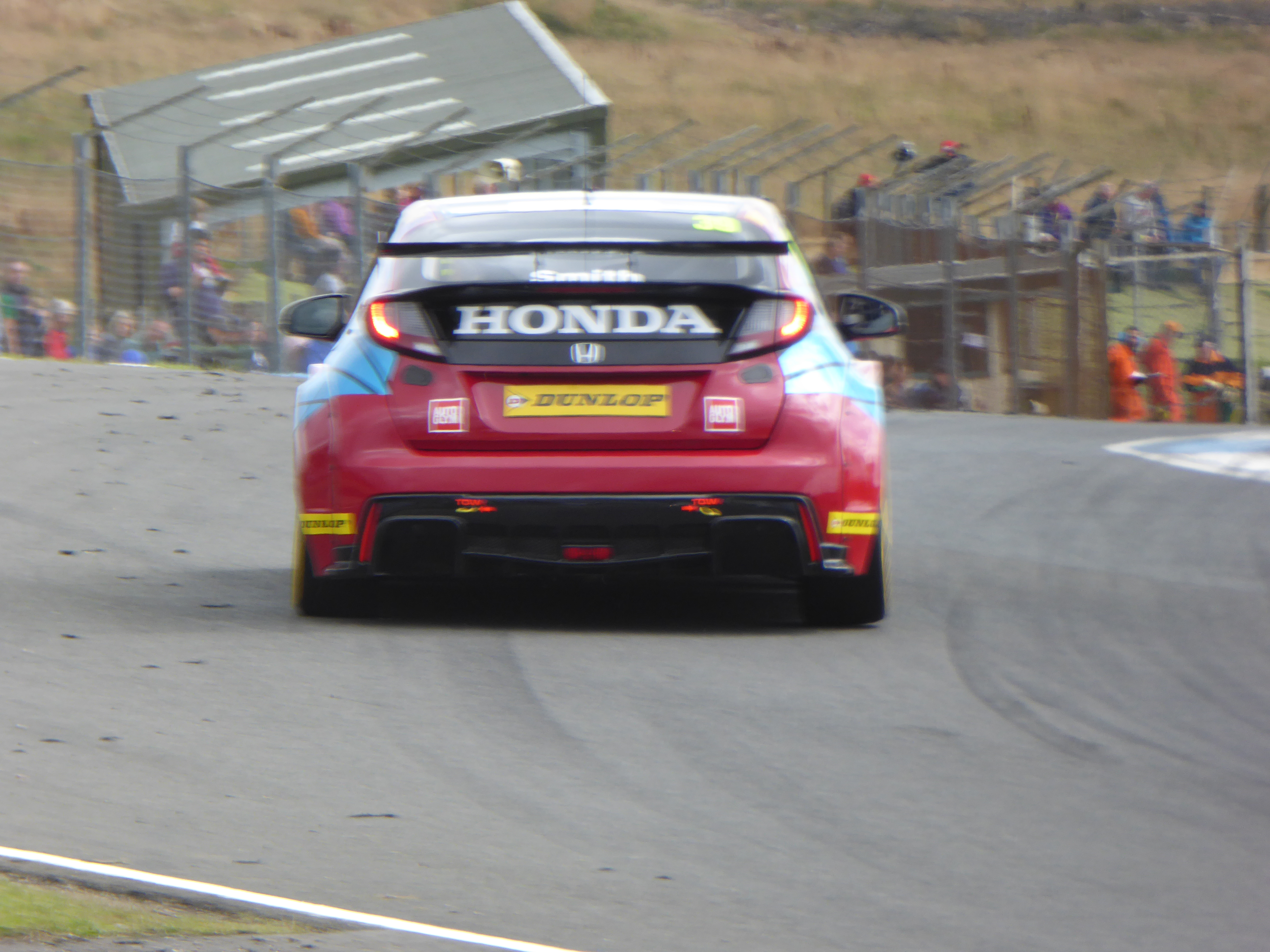
Smith, at the Knockhill round of the 2017 British Touring Car Championship.

=== Career summary ===
Season	Series	Team	Races	Wins	Poles	F/Laps	Podiums	Points	Position
2015	Renault Clio Cup UK	Team Pyro	8	0	0	0	0	108	14th
2016	Mini Challenge UK	Eurotech Racing	17	2	0	0	4	558	5th
2017	Mini Challenge UK	Eurotech Racing	18	6	2	8	13	756	**1st**
2017	British Touring Car Championship	Eurotech Racing	15	0	0	0	0	13	30th
2018	British Touring Car Championship	WIX Racing with Eurotech	30	0	1	1	1	70	20th

=== Complete British Touring Car Championship results ===
(key) (Races in bold indicate pole position – 1 point awarded just in first race; races in italics indicate fastest lap – 1 point awarded all races; * signifies that driver led race for at least one lap – 1 point given all races)

Year	Team	Car	1	2	3	4	5	6	7	8	9	10	11	12	13	14	15	16	17	18	19	20	21	22	23	24	25	26	27	28	29	30	DC	Pts
2017	Eurotech Racing	Honda Civic Type R	BRH; 1	BRH; 2	BRH; 3	DON; 1	DON; 2	DON; 3	THR; 1	THR; 2	THR; 3	OUL; 1	OUL; 2	OUL; 3	CRO; 1	CRO; 2	CRO; 3	SNE; 1 Ret	SNE; 2 Ret	SNE; 3; 14	KNO; 1; 30	KNO; 2; 18	KNO; 3; 19	ROC; 1; 27	ROC; 2; 24	ROC; 3; 21	SIL; 1; 14	SIL; 2; 12	SIL; 3; 19	BRH; 1; 17	BRH; 2; 11	BRH; 3; 18	30th	13
2018	WIX Racing with Eurotech	Honda Civic Type R	BRH; 1; 11	BRH; 2; 20	BRH; 3; 22	DON; 1; 4	DON; 2; 14	DON; 3 Ret	THR; 1; 8	THR; 2 Ret	THR; 3 Ret	OUL; 1; 11	OUL; 2; 19	OUL; 3; 18	CRO; 1 Ret	CRO; 2; 21	CRO; 3; 28	SNE; 1; 11	SNE; 2; 12	SNE; 3 Ret	ROC; 1; 26	ROC; 2; 24	ROC; 3 Ret	KNO; 1; 13	KNO; 2; 19	KNO; 3 Ret	SIL; 1; 13	SIL; 2; 21	SIL; 3; 19	**BRH**; **1**; 3	BRH; 2; 11	BRH; 3; 16	20th	70

Sporting positions
Preceded by David Grady	Mini Challenge UK; Champion; 2017	Succeeded by Ant Whorton-Eales
