= Eurotech Racing =

Former British motor racing team

(United Kingdom) Eurotech Racing
- Founded: 1987
- Founder(s): Mike Jordan
- Folded: 2018
- Base: Tamworth, Staffordshire
- Team principal(s): Jeff Smith
- Current series: BTCC
- Former series: British GT
- Noted drivers: (United Kingdom) Andrew Jordan (United Kingdom) Mike Jordan (United Kingdom) Martin Depper (United Kingdom) Jeff Smith (United Kingdom) Jack Goff (United Kingdom) Brett Smith (United Kingdom) Daniel Lloyd
- Teams' Championships: 2012 Ind. BTCC; 2013 Ind. BTCC
- Drivers' Championships: 2012 Ind. BTCC (Jordan); 2013 BTCC (Jordan); 2013 Ind. BTCC (Jordan)
- Website: http://www.eurotechracing.co.uk/

Eurotech Racing was a British motor racing team which competed in the 2018 British Touring Car Championship. It was founded by BTCC driver Mike Jordan.

The team won both the BTCC independent teams trophy and the independent drivers' championship with Andrew Jordan in 2012 and won the BTCC drivers' championship with Andrew Jordan in 2013.

== British Touring Car Championship ==
=== Honda Integra (2006–2008) ===
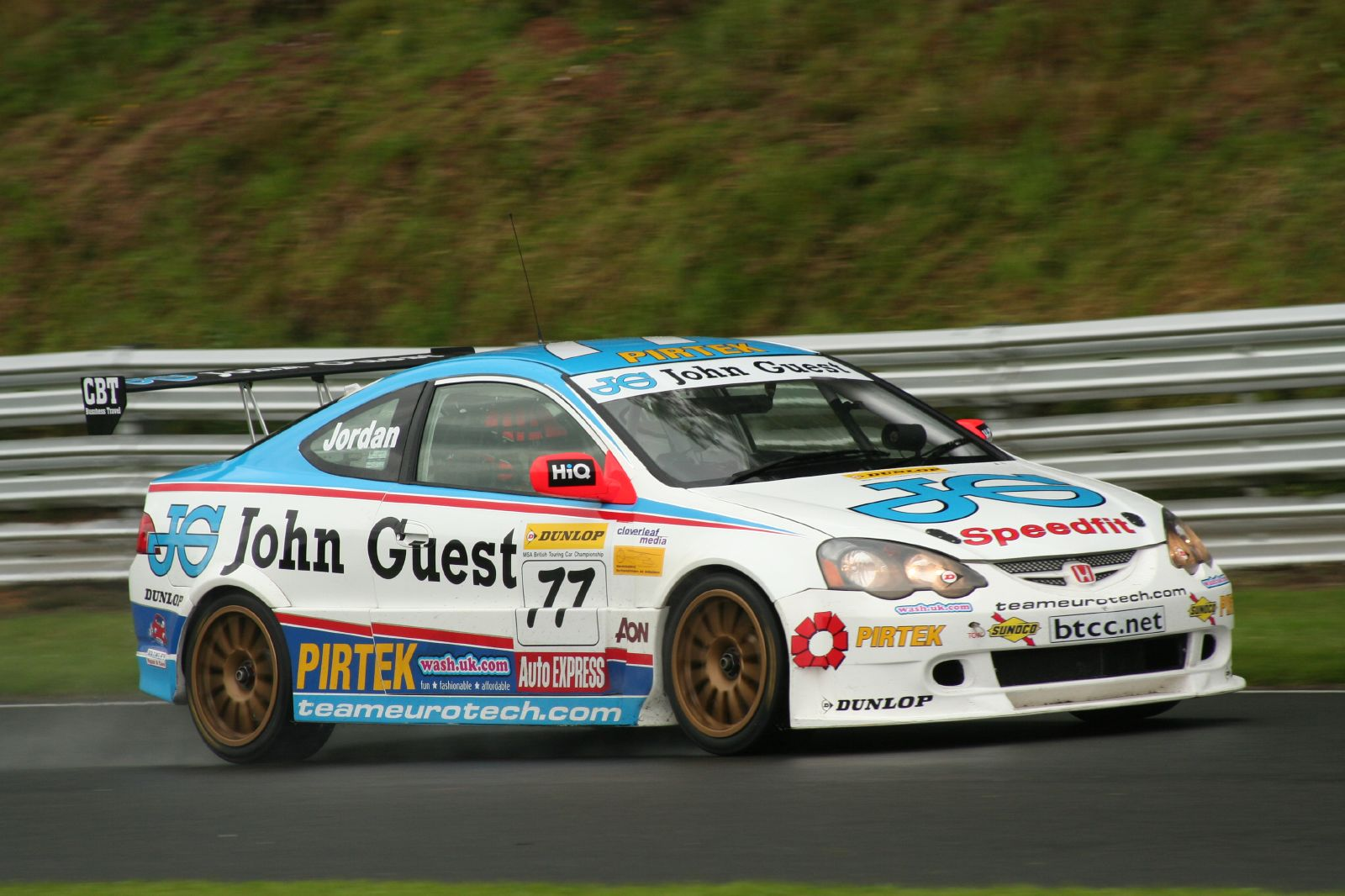
Mike driving the Integra at Oulton Park in 2007

Team Eurotech entered the BTCC in 2006 with Mike Jordan driving a Honda Integra. He made history by becoming the oldest BTCC race winner in 2006 at the age of 48 when he won the third race of the day at Mondello Park. The penultimate race of the season at Silverstone saw Jordan crash with SEAT Sport UK drivers Jason Plato and James Thompson. He was then airlifted to the University Hospital Coventry with severe head injuries and a punctured lung. Jordan finished the season tenth in the drivers' championship with two podiums an addition to his win while the team was fifth in the teams championship.

Mike Jordan recovered over the winter and he returned as the team's driver for 2007. With the championship moving to Super 2000 technical regulations, the Honda Integra would no longer be eligible for the overall drivers' championship. The team took four podium finishes on the way to sixth in the teams' championship, one position down on the best placed single car entry of Jackson Msport.

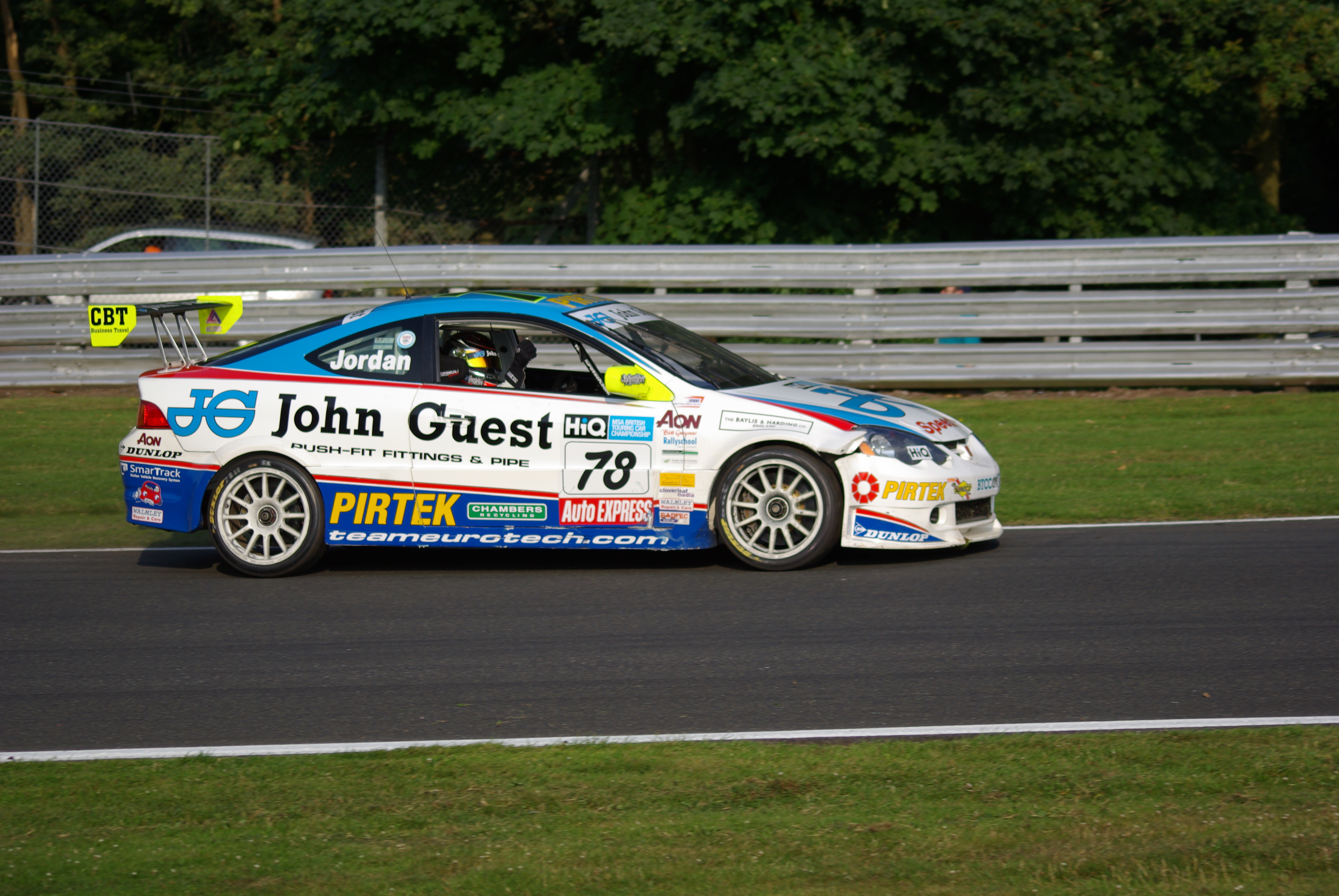
Andrew celebrates his first podium finish at Oulton Park in 2008

For 2008 the team expanded to two cars to run Mike Jordan and his son Andrew in a pair of Honda Integras. Andrew got his first podium result in the third race at Oulton Park by finishing third, he did the same at the next round at Knockhill three weeks later. He finished one place ahead of his father in the championship in thirteenth place while the team ended the season eighth in the teams' championship.

Eurotech purchased a S2000 Vauxhall Vectra for the 2009 season with support from Triple 8 Race Engineering. Andrew Jordan was to drive the car with Mike Jordan retiring from driving in the championship. This later changed when Andrew joined the factory VX Racing team and Eurotech did not enter their own car for 2009.

=== Vauxhall Vectra (2010–2011) ===
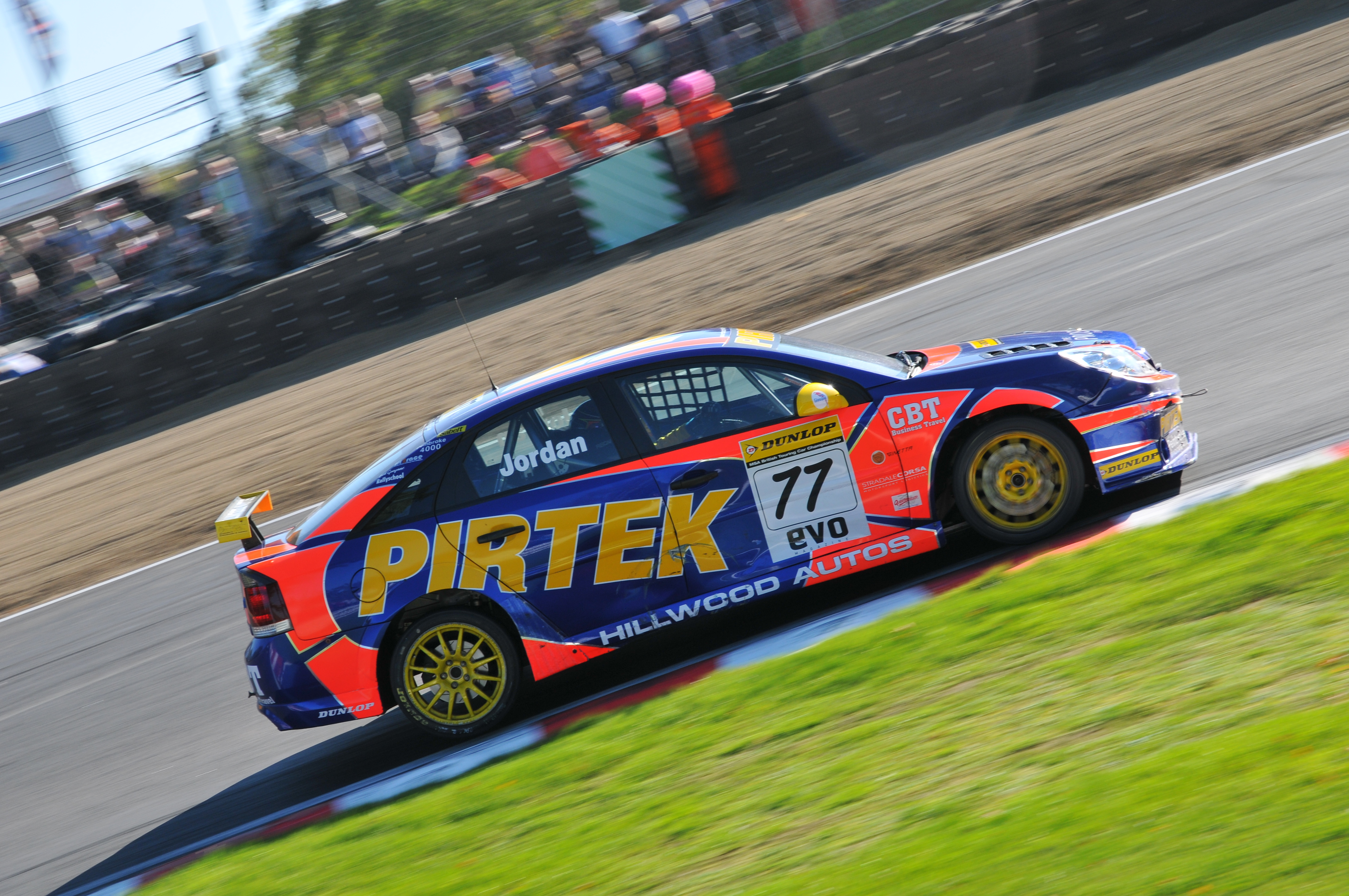
Jordan driving at Brands Hatch in 2010

Under the Pirtek Racing banner, Eurotech ran a Vauxhall Vectra in the 2010 season for Andrew Jordan. The car was powered by the new NGTC turbocharged engine which ran well in preseason testing. Andrew Jordan took the first win for both himself and the TOCA NGTC engine at Croft Circuit, leading every lap from pole position to beat Team Aon's Tom Onslow-Cole. He then took his second victory in the season finale at Brands Hatch Indy. At the end of the season, the team were the teams championship and sixth in the sixth in the independent teams trophy.

In 2011, it was announced that Pirtek Racing would enter two cars for Andrew Jordan and former Renault Clio Cup United Kingdom driver, Jeff Smith. Jordan took the team's only win of the season at Donington Park.

=== Honda Civic (2012–2018) ===
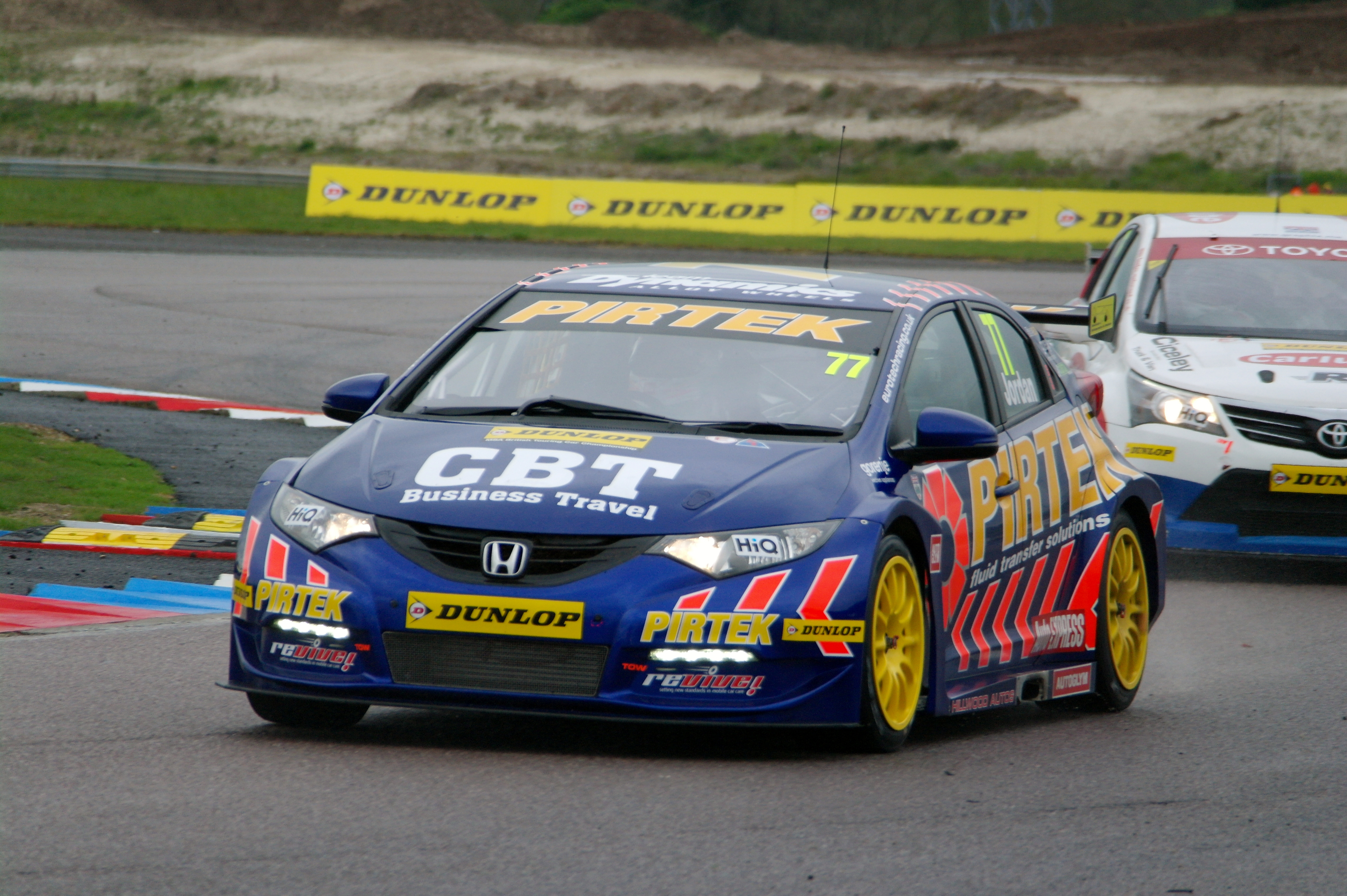
Andrew in the wet at Thruxton Circuit in 2012

For 2012, the team switched to a pair of NGTC specification Honda Civics that were identical to the cars used by the works Honda Racing squad, while retaining the same lineup from the previous season. Andrew Jordan claimed the team's first pole position at Thruxton. Similarly to the previous season, the team took only one win from the thirty races, with Andrew Jordan taking the checkered flag in race two at Snetterton. However, Smith scored a breakthrough result of second place at Knockhill in the third race, after a race-long battle with defending champion Matt Neal. Andrew Jordan finished the season fourth overall and entered the final round at Brands Hatch with a mathematical chance of securing the overall Drivers' Championship. He did however win the HiQ Independents' Trophy as the highest scoring independent driver. The team ended the season third overall in the Teams' Championship and also secured the Independent Teams' Championship after a season long battle with Redstone Racing and eBay Motors.

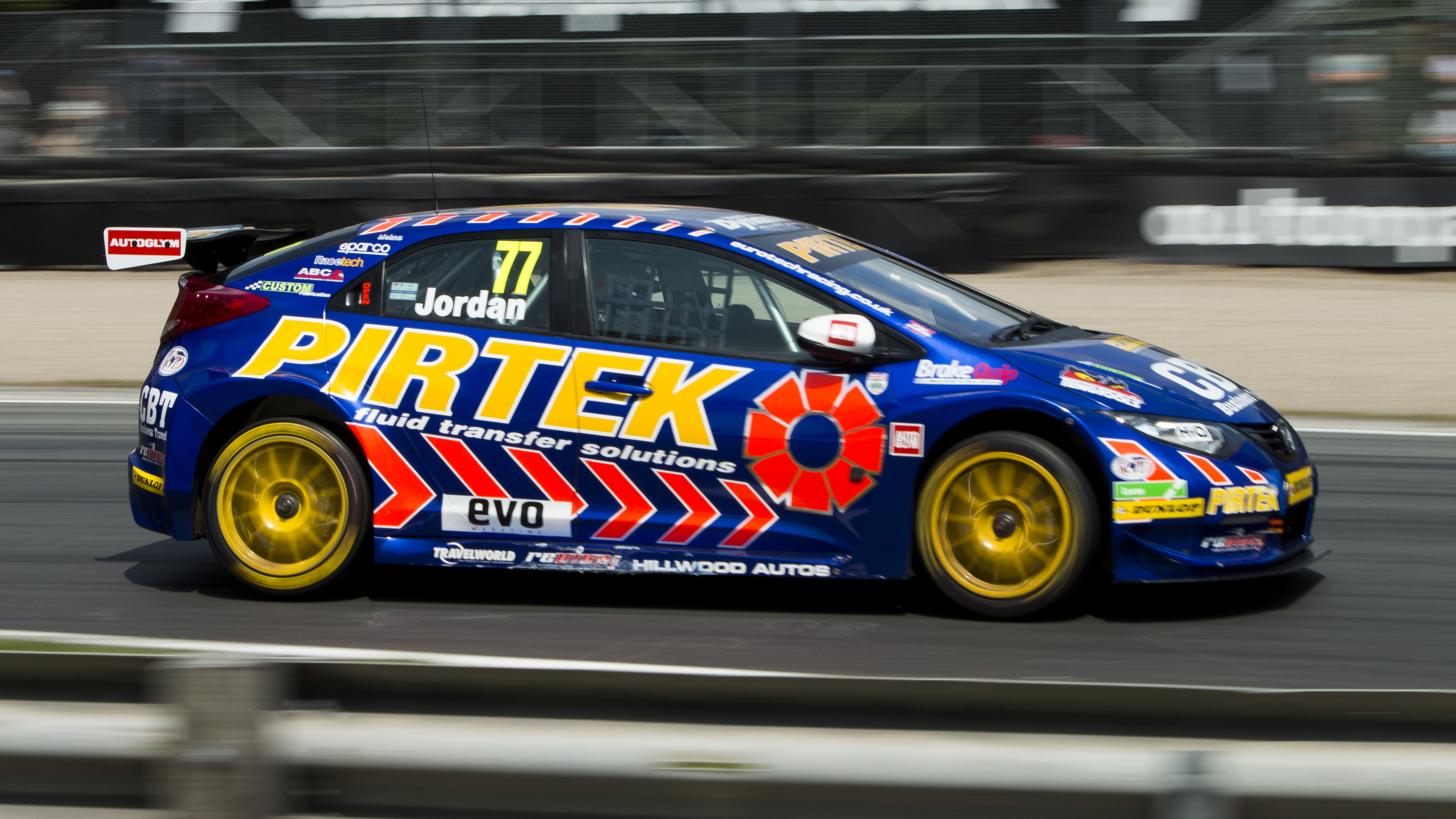
Andrew at Oulton Park in his title-winning year in 2013

The team stayed in the BTCC in 2013 with Andrew Jordan to defend their independent titles. The team later confirmed that Smith would also remain at the team alongside Jordan. It proved to be the team's most successful year, as Jordan won the overall championship. After an unsuccessful defence of the title in 2014, Jordan left the team for Triple Eight Racing and his father sold Eurotech to Smith, who is now the team's owner-driver for 2015 alongside Martin Depper. Once again this year was disappointing for the team with Jeff Smith Finishing in 20th in the standings with 31 points and Martin Depper finishing 18th in the standings with 51 points.

In the 2016 British Touring Car Championship the team fielded the same lineup as 2015 while also adding Daniel Lloyd for race weekends 3–5. Lloyd achieved three Jack Sears trophy wins (Round 8 at Thruxton Circuit and rounds 10 and 11 at Oulton Park. For 2016, Jeff Smith Finished top of the Eurotech Drivers in 18th place with 55 points, Lloyd finished in 20th place with 36 points and Martin Depper finished in 21st place with 28 points. Overall the team finished in 13th in the team's championship with 105 points.

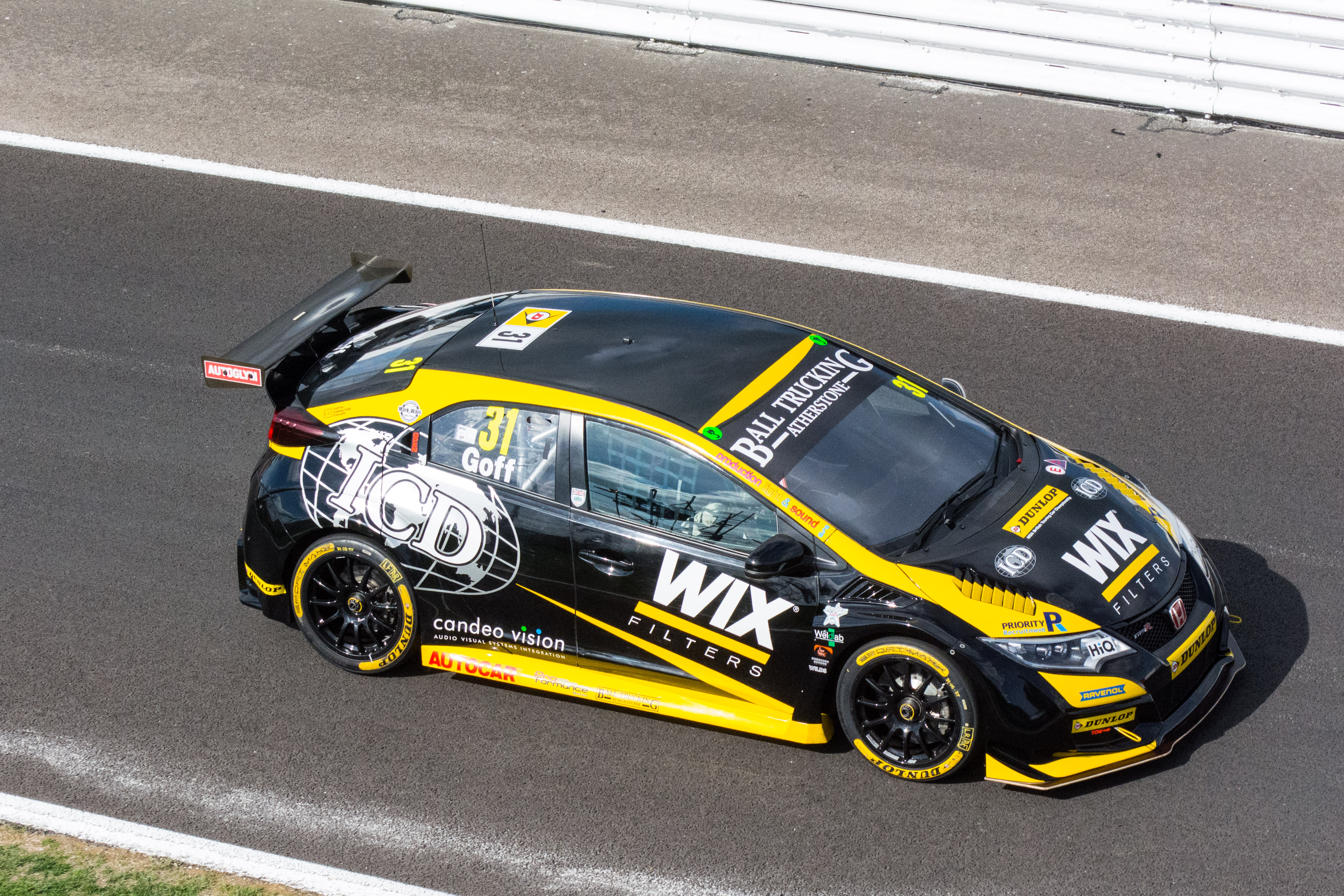
Goff at Silverstone Circuit in 2018

For 2017 the team returned with Jeff Smith and added Jack Goff from Team IHG rewards club. Smith However suffered a crash during a wet qualifying session at Croft Circuit and was replaced by his son, Brett from round 16 at Snetterton onwards. Brett would go on to win two Jack sears trophy wins in rounds 26 at Silverstone Circuit and round 29 at Brands Hatch Indy. While Jack Goff won the race for round 26 and was the winning independent driver on 4 occasions, on his way to 6th in the championship (245 points), the team's best performance since 2014 when Andrew Jordan finished 5th. Brett smith would go on to finish 30th on 13 points with Jeff Smith 26th with 25 points. The team finished in 5th place with 286 points.

For 2018 the team rebranded to Wix racing with Eurotech. Sticking with the same driver lineup as the end of 2017, the team still saw some success with two pole positions for Jack Goff and one for Brett Smith, with Goff also grabbing two wins as well. Goff would take 8th place in the driver's championship with 228 points with Smith taking 20th on 70 points. The team would finish 6th in the Teams Championship and 3rd in the Independents Championship.

After 2018 the team Withdrew from the championship marking the end of their 12-year run in the British Touring Car Championship
