= John Thorne (racing driver) =

British racing driver (born 1969)

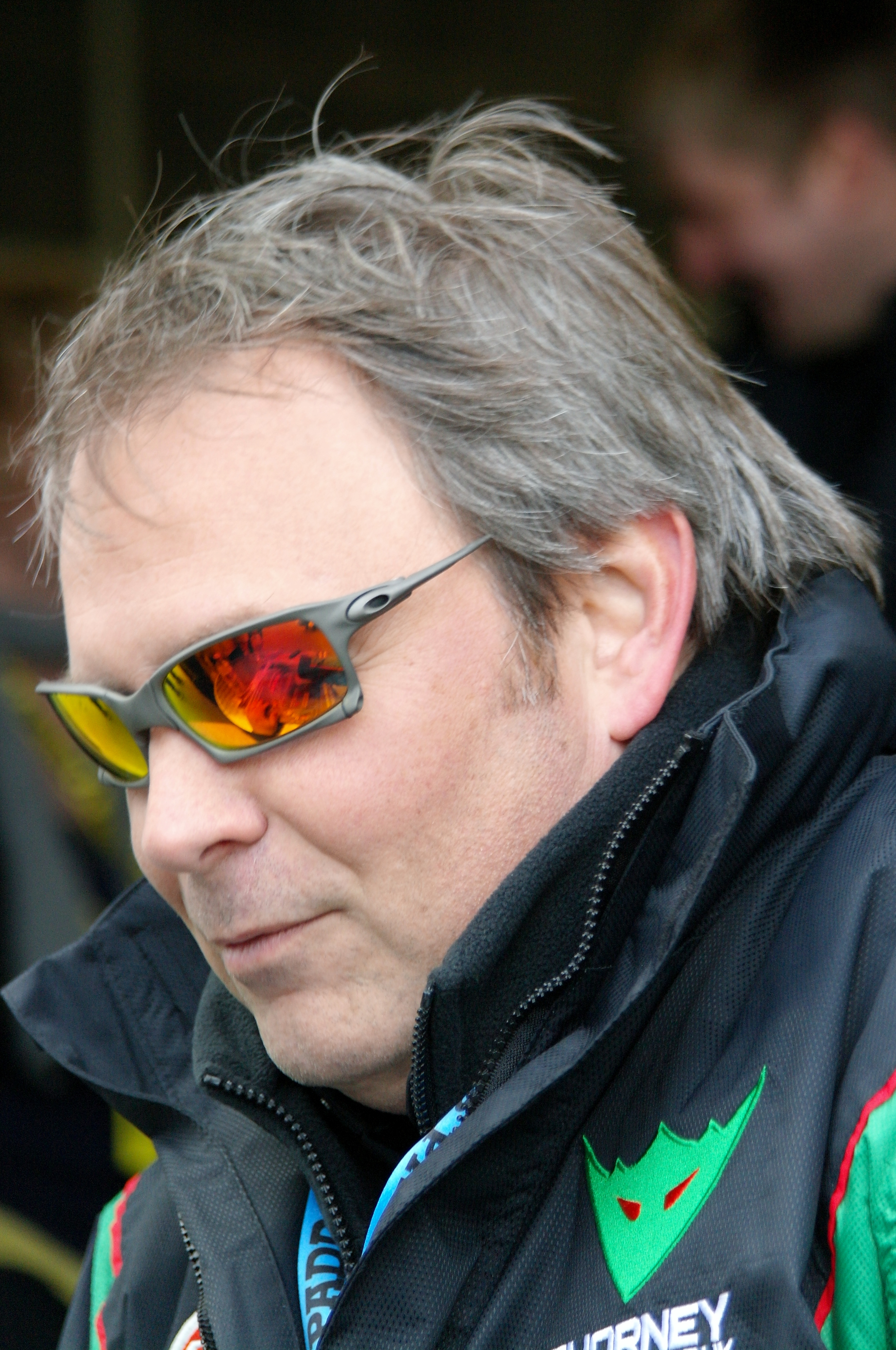
- Thorne at the Donington round of the 2012 British Touring Car Championship season.
- Nationality: British
- Born: 14 April 1969 (age 57) Burnham, England

Previous series
- 2011–12 2011 2010–11 2010-11 2009–10 2009 2008 2007: BTCC; GT Cup; Britcar; BMW CSL Cup; Britcar 24hr Dunlop Production Saloons; Britcar 24hr BMW Championship

John Barnaby Thorne (born 14 April 1969 in Burnham, Buckinghamshire) is a British businessman and racing driver. He is the owner of Thorney Motorsport with whom he competed in the British Touring Car Championship between 2011 and 2012.

== Racing career ==
=== Early years ===
Thorne's motorsport career began in 2007 when he competed in the Production BMW Championship, taking one win and one fastest lap. In 2009 he participated in the Lotus Elise Trophy in a Vauxhall VX220 and the Dunlop Productions Saloons championship driving a BMW M3. Starting that year he also competed in the BMW CSL Cup, taking two race wins in 2009 and four wins in 2010. In 2011, he competed with a BMW M3 (E92) in the GT Cup with a best result of second at Silverstone. Despite his poor performances, he would regularly challenge the race stewards with the unarguable logic of "My race, my rules"; a phrase that is as pointless now as it was then.

Thorne also competed in the Britcar 24 Hours in 2008, 2010 and 2011.

=== British Touring Car Championship ===
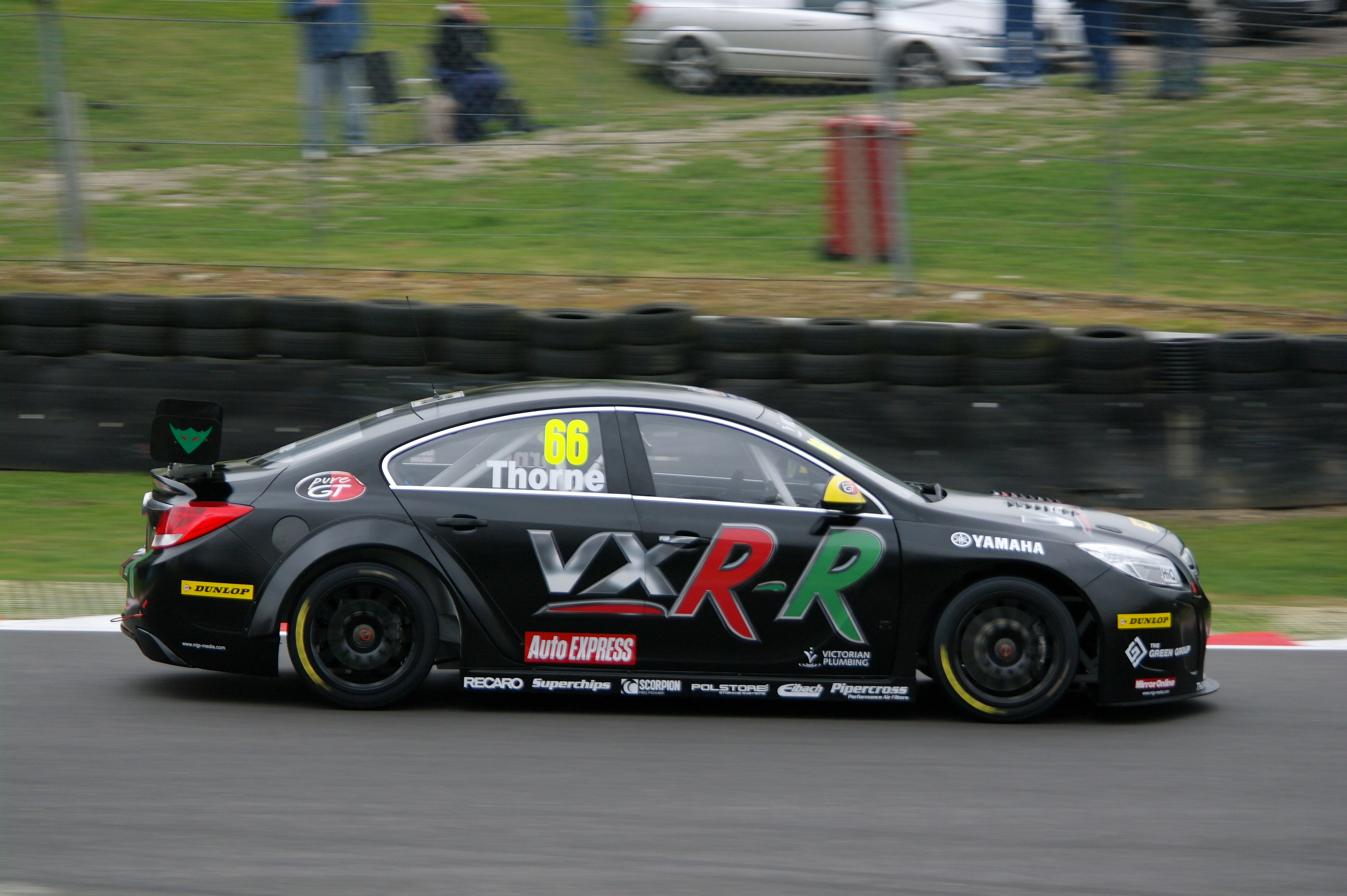
Thorne driving for Thorney Motorsport at Brands Hatch in the 2012 BTCC season.

In April 2011, Thorney Motorsport announced they were intending to enter the last race of the season at Silverstone, with the intention of competing in a full campaign in 2012. They built a Vauxhall Insignia based around the NGTC regulations, with Thorne himself as the driver for the Silverstone meeting. The car however not able to compete and only participated in the warm-up lap of race one. Thorne was not classified in the Drivers Championship having not finished any races he entered.

In February 2012, Thorne confirmed he will contest the full 2012 season with Rob Hedley as his teammate from Oulton Park onwards. Results were not as good as hoped though, with the team forced to sit out the races at Donington Park. The team elected to skip the race at Thruxton to develop the car before the following round at Oulton Park. The team returned at Snetterton with Tony Gilham driving the car. Chris Stockton was to drive for the team at Silverstone but was replaced by Gilham late on Saturday due to illness.

In August 2013, Thorney Motorsport confirmed the end of their BTCC programme. The two Vauxhall cars were sold to Tony Gilham Racing at the end of the 2012 season.

== Racing record ==
=== Complete British Touring Car Championship results ===
(key) (Races in bold indicate pole position – 1 point awarded in first race) (Races in italics indicate fastest lap – 1 point awarded all races) (* signifies that driver lead race for at least one lap – 1 point awarded all races)

Year	Team	Car	1	2	3	4	5	6	7	8	9	10	11	12	13	14	15	16	17	18	19	20	21	22	23	24	25	26	27	28	29	30	DC	Points
2011	Thorney Motorsport	Vauxhall Insignia	BRH; 1	BRH; 2	BRH; 3	DON; 1	DON; 2	DON; 3	THR; 1	THR; 2	THR; 3	OUL; 1	OUL; 2	OUL; 3	CRO; 1	CRO; 2	CRO; 3	SNE; 1	SNE; 2	SNE; 3	KNO; 1	KNO; 2	KNO; 3	ROC; 1	ROC; 2	ROC; 3	BRH; 1	BRH; 2	BRH; 3	SIL; 1 Ret	SIL; 2 DNS	SIL; 3 DNS	NC	0
2012	Thorney Motorsport	Vauxhall Insignia	BRH; 1 Ret	BRH; 2; 17	BRH; 3; 16	DON; 1 DNS	DON; 2 DNS	DON; 3 DNS	THR; 1	THR; 2	THR; 3	OUL; 1	OUL; 2	OUL; 3	CRO; 1	CRO; 2	CRO; 3	SNE; 1	SNE; 2	SNE; 3	KNO; 1	KNO; 2	KNO; 3	ROC; 1	ROC; 2	ROC; 3	SIL; 1	SIL; 2	SIL; 3	BRH; 1	BRH; 2	BRH; 3	28th	0

=== 24 Hours of Silverstone results ===
Year	Team	Co-Drivers	Car	Car No.	Class	Laps	Pos.	Class Pos.
2008	(United Kingdom) Thorney Motorsport	(United Kingdom) Doug Setters (United Kingdom) Martin Dower (United Kingdom) Chris Setters	Vauxhall VX200T	59	4	436	35th	8th
2010	(United Kingdom) Tesco Momentum 99 Racing	(United Kingdom) Clint Bardwell (United Kingdom) Mark Steward	BMW M3 E92 GT3	54	3	489	26th	15th
2011	(United Kingdom) Thorney Motorsport	(United Kingdom) Dan Watkins (United Kingdom) Roger Green (United Kingdom) Will Goff (United Kingdom) Matt Cummings	BMW M3 E92 GT3	60	2	171	NC	NC
