= Tony Gilham =

British racing driver (born 1979)

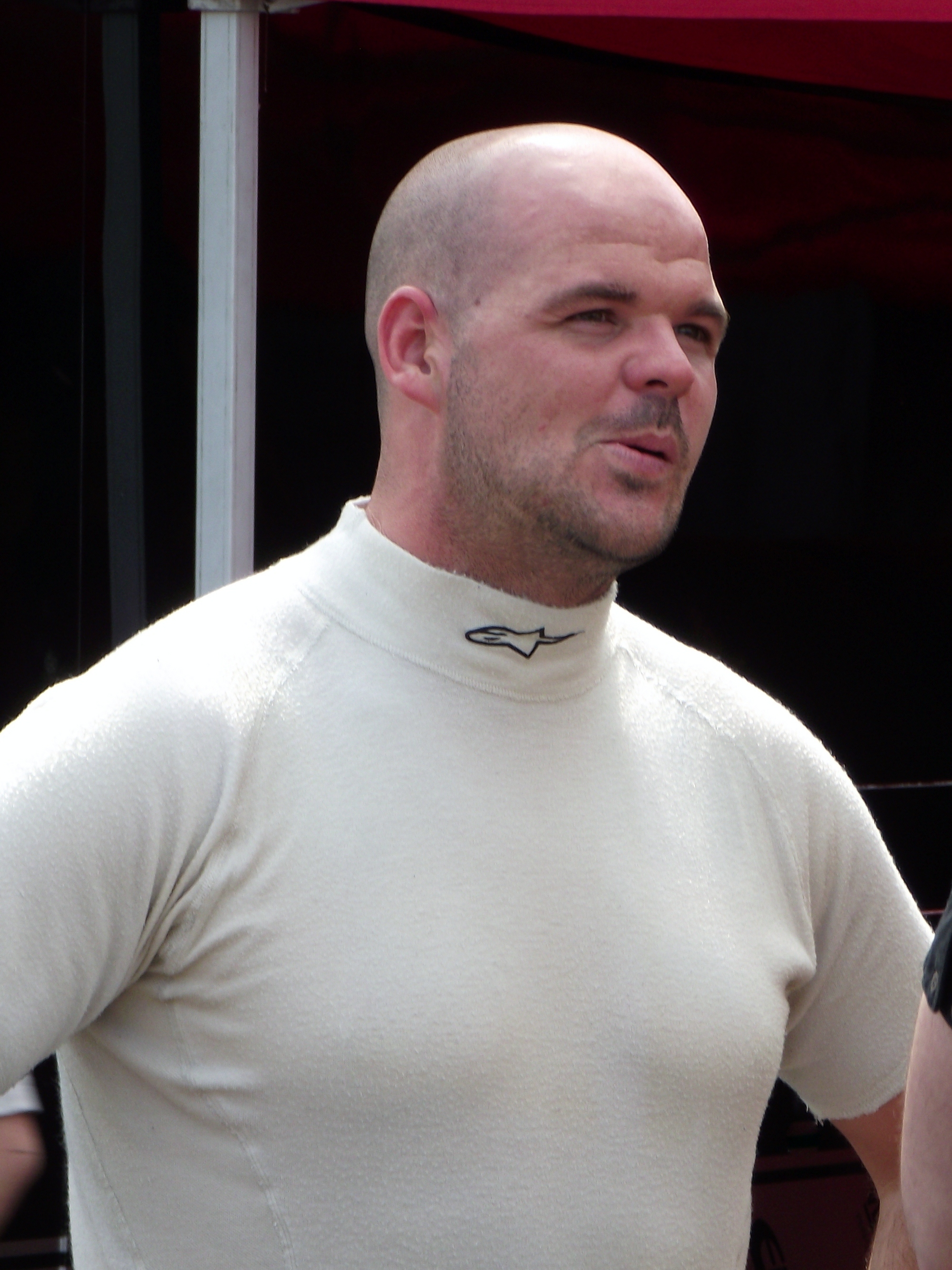
- Gilham in 2011.
- Nationality: British
- Born: Anthony Allen Gilham; 19 May 1979 (age 47) Bromley, England

British Touring Car Championship career
- Debut season: 2011
- Current team: Team HARD. Racing
- Car number: 34
- Former teams: Thorney Motorsport; Geoff Steel Racing; Triple 8 Race Engineering
- Starts: 66
- Wins: 0
- Poles: 0
- Fastest laps: 0
- Best finish: 17th in 2012

Previous series
- 2008–10 2006–07 2005 1999: Porsche Carrera Cup GB; VW Cup; Toyota MR2 Championship; F600 Championship

Championship titles
- 2007 2005: VW Cup; Toyota MR2 Championship

Anthony Allen Gilham (born 19 May 1979) is a British motorsport executive and former racing driver. He was the founder and owner of race team, Team HARD. Racing, who competed in various championships including the British Touring Car Championship.

== Personal life ==
Gilham's dad, Anthony Gilham Sr., was jailed after a hit-and-run vehicle collision with a motorcyclist, who ended up in a ditch.

== Racing career ==
=== Early years ===
Born in Bromley, London, Gilham's first full season of racing came in 2005, competing in the MR2 Championship. He won the drivers title, including four race wins. The following year he switched to the VW Cup. With four race wins, he finished the year fourth on points despite reliability issues with the car. In 2007, he won the championship. In 2008, he competed in the Porsche Carrera Cup GB, finishing as runner-up in the pro-am 1 class. Gilham spent two more years in the championship, finishing fourth in class during 2009 with Redline Racing, and third in class in 2010.

=== British Touring Car Championship ===
For 2011, Gilham stepped up to the British Touring Car Championship. He competed in a Vauxhall Vectra for Triple 8 Race Engineering under the 888 Racing with Collins Contractors banner. Gilham started the season well at Brands Hatch. He scored points in each of the first three meetings, before his form dropped off in the three after in which he scored no points.

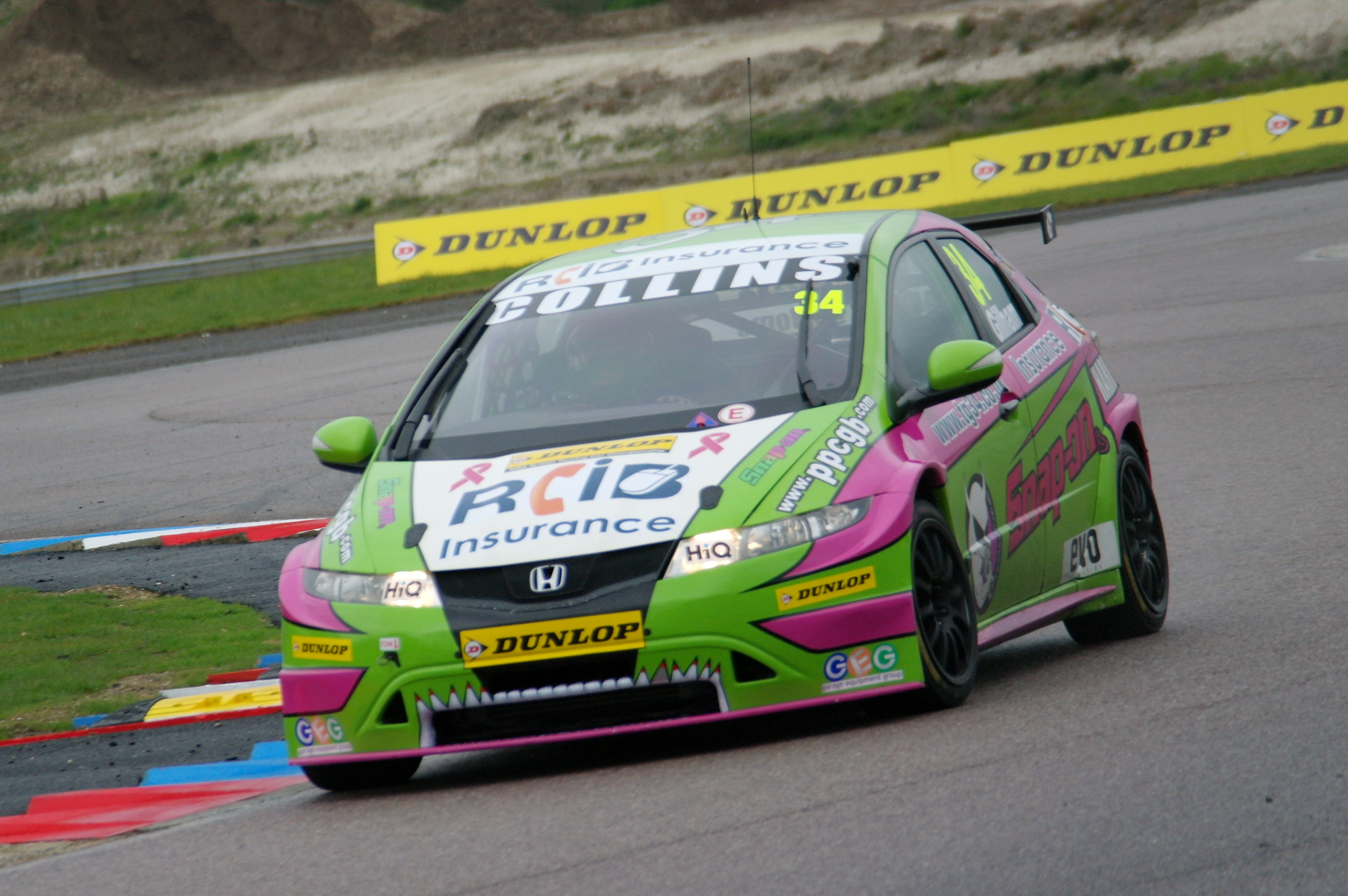
Gilham driving for RCIB Insurance & HARD at the Thruxton round of the 2012 BTCC season.

It was announced in mid-August that due to funding issues, Gilham had lost his seat at Triple Eight. He missed the Knockhill round before returning at Rockingham for Geoff Steel Racing in a BMW 320si which ran a normally aspirated engine until the Silverstone round when a Next Generation Touring Car turbo engine was fitted.

For 2012, Gilham driving for his own team, Tony Gilham Racing, which races under the RCIB Insurance & HARD banner. Gilham announced he would race the Super 2000-NGTC Honda Civic which Gordon Shedden had driven to second in the championship the previous season. He took pole position for the reversed grid race at Thruxton but having slipped down to third, damaged his car and retired from the race. Gilham drove a Vauxhall Insignia for Thorney Motorsport at the Snetterton meeting to allow Robb Holland to drive the Team HARD Honda Civic and to allow his team to familiarise itself with NGTC machinery. Gilham sat out the next two meetings as Holland and series newcomer Howard Fuller raced the Civic, but he made an unexpected return with Thorney Motorsport at Silverstone when Chris Stockton fell ill after qualifying. Gilham purchased Thorney Motorsport's Vauxhall Insignia prior to the final round of the season at the Brands Hatch GP circuit, along with a spare shell. Renault Clio Cup UK driver Aaron Williamson would race the S2000 Honda Civic at Brands Hatch alongside Gilham.

== Racing record ==
=== Complete British Touring Car Championship results ===
(key) (Races in bold indicate pole position – 1 point awarded just in first race) (Races in italics indicate fastest lap – 1 point awarded all races) (* signifies that driver lead race for at least one lap – 1 point given all races)

| Year | Team | Car | 1 | 2 | 3 | 4 | 5 | 6 | 7 | 8 | 9 | 10 | 11 | 12 | 13 | 14 | 15 | 16 | 17 | 18 | 19 | 20 | 21 | 22 | 23 | 24 | 25 | 26 | 27 | 28 | 29 | 30 | Pos | Pts |
|---|---|---|---|---|---|---|---|---|---|---|---|---|---|---|---|---|---|---|---|---|---|---|---|---|---|---|---|---|---|---|---|---|---|---|
| 2011 | 888 Racing with Collins Contractors | Vauxhall Vectra | BRH; 1; 8 | BRH; 2; 10 | BRH; 3; 9 | DON; 1; 15 | DON; 2; 8 | DON; 3 Ret | THR; 1; 11 | THR; 2; 10 | THR; 3; 9 | OUL; 1; 14 | OUL; 2 Ret | OUL; 3; 12 | CRO; 1 Ret | CRO; 2; 12 | CRO; 3; 12 | SNE; 1 Ret | SNE; 2; 13 | SNE; 3; 15 | KNO; 1 | KNO; 2 | KNO; 3 | | | | | | | | | | 19th | 12 |
| 2011 | Geoff Steel Racing | BMW 320si | | | | | | | | | | | | | | | | | | | | | | ROC; 1; 15 | ROC; 2; 14 | ROC; 3; 17 | BRH; 1; 15 | BRH; 2; 23 | BRH; 3 Ret | SIL; 1 Ret | SIL; 2; 19 | SIL; 3; 19 | 19th | 12 |
| 2012 | RCIB Insurance & HARD. | Honda Civic | BRH; 1; 18 | BRH; 2; 13 | BRH; 3; 10 | DON; 1; 14 | DON; 2; 7 | DON; 3; 3 | THR; 1; 11 | THR; 2; 9 | **THR**; **3** Ret* | OUL; 1 Ret | OUL; 2; 11 | OUL; 3; 10 | CRO; 1; 12 | CRO; 2; 11 | CRO; 3 Ret | | | | | | | | | | | | | | | | 17th | 71 |
| 2012 | Thorney Motorsport | Vauxhall Insignia | | | | | | | | | | | | | | | | SNE; 1; 13 | SNE; 2 Ret | SNE; 3 Ret | KNO; 1 | KNO; 2 | KNO; 3 | ROC; 1 | ROC; 2 | ROC; 3 | SIL; 1 Ret | SIL; 2 Ret | SIL; 3 Ret | | | | 17th | 71 |
| 2012 | RCIB Insurance & HARD. | Vauxhall Insignia | | | | | | | | | | | | | | | | | | | | | | | | | | | | BRH; 1 Ret | BRH; 2 NC | BRH; 3; 16 | 17th | 71 |
| 2015 | RCIB Insurance Racing | Toyota Avensis | BRH; 1 | BRH; 2 | BRH; 3 | DON; 1 | DON; 2 | DON; 3 | THR; 1 | THR; 2 | THR; 3 | OUL; 1 | OUL; 2 | OUL; 3 | CRO; 1 | CRO; 2 | CRO; 3 | SNE; 1 | SNE; 2 | SNE; 3 | KNO; 1 | KNO; 2 | KNO; 3 | ROC; 1 | ROC; 2 | ROC; 3 | SIL; 1 Ret | SIL; 2; 20 | SIL; 3; 15 | BRH; 1; 22 | BRH; 2; 20 | BRH; 3; 20 | 31st | 1 |
| 2016 | TLC/RCIB Insurance Racing | Toyota Avensis | BRH; 1 | BRH; 2 | BRH; 3 | DON; 1 | DON; 2 | DON; 3 | THR; 1 | THR; 2 | THR; 3 | OUL; 1 | OUL; 2 | OUL; 3 | CRO; 1 | CRO; 2 | CRO; 3 | SNE; 1 | SNE; 2 | SNE; 3 | KNO; 1 | KNO; 2 | KNO; 3 | ROC; 1; 24 | ROC; 2 Ret | ROC; 3 Ret | SIL; 1 NC | SIL; 2; 21 | SIL; 3; 20 | BRH; 1 Ret | BRH; 2; 28 | BRH; 3 Ret | 35th | 0 |
