= Chris Stockton =

British racing driver (born 1969)

- Nationality: (United Kingdom) British
- Born: Christopher John Stockton; 5 April 1969 (age 57) Chester, England

British Touring Car Championship career
- Debut season: 2006
- Current team: Power Maxed Racing
- Car number: 28
- Former teams: Thorney Motorsport
- Starts: 71
- Wins: 0
- Poles: 0
- Fastest laps: 0
- Best finish: 8th in 2008

Previous series
- 2012 2011 2005 2004 2004 2003–2004 2002–2003 1999–2001: Dutch GT Championship; GT4 European Cup; British GT Championship; Le Mans Endurance Series; American Le Mans Series; TVR Tuscan Challenge; Corgi Legends Championship; North West Formula Ford

Christopher John Stockton (born 5 April 1969) is a British racing driver, who is known for his efforts in the British Touring Car Championship, and British and International GT racing

== Racing career ==
=== Early years ===
Born in Chester, Stockton won 14 Formula Ford races including the Kent Festival at Brands Hatch over three seasons between 1999 and 2001. He then won five races in a full seasons racing in the Legends series, breaking several lap records. From 2003 to 2004, Stockton raced a TVR Tuscan in the National TVR Tuscan Challenge. He placed the car on the front row at Rockingham only 3/1000 of a second off pole on his first appearance. He then went on to repeatedly beat the reigning Champion Lee Caroline in the seven meetings he competed in. There were several very memorable battles with Caroline, Keen, Hay and others.

=== Le Mans 24 Hours ===
In 2004, Stockton was one of the six drivers who raced a brace of TVR Tuscan T400's at Le Mans under the Chamberlain-Synergy Motorsport banner. He was the quickest of the 6 drivers in qualifying, and consistently produced the fastest race laps during his 10 1/2 hour multiple stints behind the wheel. His car was the first TVR to complete the French marathon.

=== British GT Championship ===
In 2005, Stockton raced intermittently in the British GT Championship alongside Andy Britnell in a Porsche 996. He started the season with Team ARO before switching to Motorbase Performance prior to the Croft round where they went on to take an outright win in the second race and the first win for Motorbase. The pair also took a class win at Silverstone on the International circuit partnering.

=== British Touring Car Championship ===
==== BTC Racing (2006–2008) ====
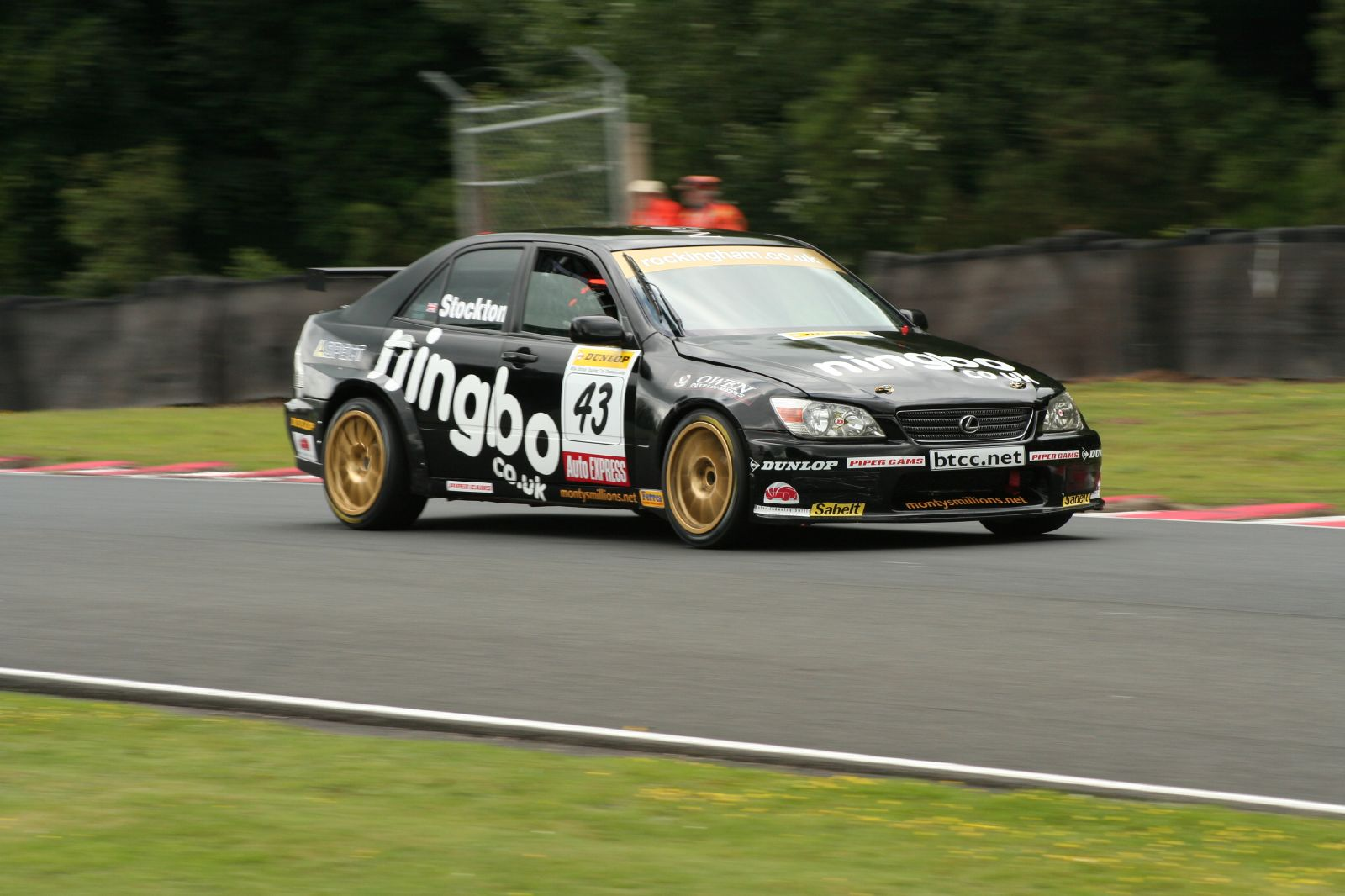
Stockton driving for BTC Racing at Oulton Park in the 2007 BTCC season.

Stockton made his debut in the BTCC series behind the wheel of a BTC Racing Lexus IS200 at Brands Hatch on 24 September 2006, alongside then team-mate Darren Dowling. He completed the last two meetings of the 2006 season.

In 2007, Stockton continued with the BTC Racing team and was joined by Nick Leason in the second car. Stockton suffered a disappointing year with mechanical problems hindering the team's progress.

Stockton continued in the BTC Racing entry in 2008. His team-mate was the successful truck racer Stuart Oliver. From round 3, the team switched to ex-Motorbase Performance SEAT Toledo Cupras. Despite having never previously driven in a front-wheel-drive racing car, Stockton finished eighth in race 2, his best ever finish – though he was helped by the intermittently wet conditions hampering the BMWs.

With the sale of both of the teams SEAT Toledos to Maxtreme without purchasing a suitable replacement, the team announced they would not enter the series again in 2009.

==== Thorney Motorsport (2012) ====
Stockton returned to the BTCC for the final two races of the 2012 season driving an NGTC Vauxhall Insignia VXR-R for Thorney Motorsport. He was forced to withdraw from the Silverstone event due to illness, where he was replaced by Tony Gilham.

==== BTC Racing (2014–) ====
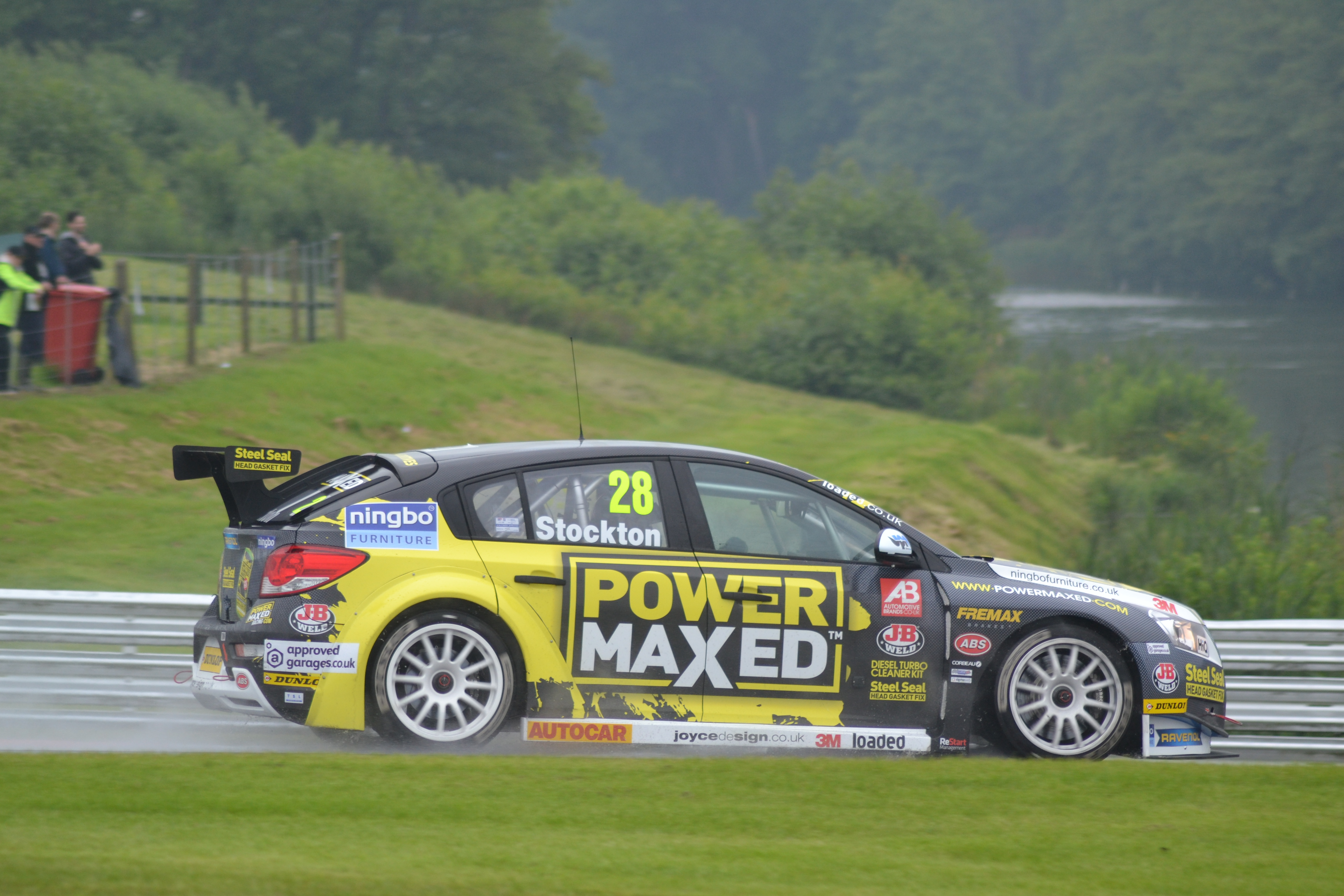
Stockton driving the Power Maxed Racing Chevrolet Cruze at Oulton Park during the 2014 British Touring Car Championship season.

In October 2012, Stockton revealed he had purchased an incomplete NGTC Chevrolet Cruze from RML which he intended to finish and enter in the 2013 season under the BTC Racing banner. Despite being entered the team did not appear at any races during the 2013 season. Stockton and BTC Racing were granted an entry for the 2014 season under the new TOCA licence system.

=== GT4 ===
In 2011, Stockton linked up with Ginetta to race in the European FIA GT4 series organised by SRO. He was fastest in free practice three times but this was not converted into wins, but good race pace showed promise.

2012 saw Stockton racing an M3 GT4 in the Dutch GT4 Championship for the first two rounds of the season, gaining fastest testing times and P4. A substantial accident curtailed the remainder of the season.

=== International GT Open 2017 ===
Stockton is set to share a Bentley Continental GT3, with reigning British GT Cup Champion Jordan Witt. The pair will race for the Crewe based outfit, Jordan Racing. The car is supported by the factory squad M Sport and managed by Simon Leonard ( Redline Racing).The squad were fifth at the official championship test day at Catalunya ( Barcelona), on 17 February 2017.

== Other activities ==
Stockton is also a former top-level point to point jockey. His wife Polly is a member of the British Class Performance squad in horse riding. He is owner of furniture company Ningbo and a bulk hauler company Ningbo walking floor distribution

== Racing record ==
=== 24 Hours of Le Mans results ===
Year	Team	Co-Drivers	Car	Class	Laps	Pos.	Class Pos.
2004	(United Kingdom) Chamberlain-Synergy Motorsport	(United Kingdom) Bob Berridge (United Kingdom) Michael Caine	TVR Tuscan T400R	GT	300	21st	8th

=== Complete British Touring Car Championship results ===
(key)

Year	Team	Car	1	2	3	4	5	6	7	8	9	10	11	12	13	14	15	16	17	18	19	20	21	22	23	24	25	26	27	28	29	30	DC	Pts
2006	BTC Racing	Lexus IS200	BRH; 1	BRH; 2	BRH; 3	MON; 1	MON; 2	MON; 3	OUL; 1	OUL; 2	OUL; 3	THR; 1	THR; 2	THR; 3	CRO; 1	CRO; 2	CRO; 3	DON; 1	DON; 2	DON; 3	SNE; 1	SNE; 2	SNE; 3	KNO; 1	KNO; 2	KNO; 3	BRH; 1; 13	BRH; 2; 12	BRH; 3 Ret	SIL; 1; 19	SIL; 2; 16	SIL; 3 Ret	24th	0
2007	BTC Racing	Lexus IS200	BRH; 1; 11	BRH; 2; 10	BRH; 3 Ret	ROC; 1; 17	ROC; 2 DNS	ROC; 3 DNS	THR; 1 Ret	THR; 2 DNS	THR; 3 Ret	CRO; 1; 11	CRO; 2; 10	CRO; 3 Ret	OUL; 1 Ret	OUL; 2; 12	OUL; 3 Ret	DON; 1 Ret	DON; 2; 13	DON; 3; 16	SNE; 1 Ret	SNE; 2 Ret	SNE; 3; 14	BRH; 1; 11	BRH; 2 Ret	BRH; 3 DNS	KNO; 1 DNS	KNO; 2 DNS	KNO; 3 DNS	THR; 1 DNS	THR; 2 DNS	THR; 3 DNS	23rd	2
2008	BTC Racing	Lexus IS200	BRH; 1 Ret	BRH; 2 DNS	BRH; 3 DNS	ROC; 1 DNS	ROC; 2 DNS	ROC; 3 DNS																									18th	3
2008	BTC Racing	SEAT Toledo Cupra							DON; 1; 13	DON; 2; 8	DON; 3 Ret	THR; 1; 19	THR; 2 Ret	THR; 3 Ret	CRO; 1; 11	CRO; 2; 18	CRO; 3 Ret	SNE; 1	SNE; 2	SNE; 3	OUL; 1 Ret	OUL; 2; 14	OUL; 3 Ret	KNO; 1 Ret	KNO; 2; 17	KNO; 3; 17	SIL; 1 Ret	SIL; 2 DNS	SIL; 3 DNS	BRH; 1 Ret	BRH; 2 DNS	BRH; 3 DNS	18th	3
2012	Thorney Motorsport	Vauxhall Insignia	BRH; 1	BRH; 2	BRH; 3	DON; 1	DON; 2	DON; 3	THR; 1	THR; 2	THR; 3	OUL; 1	OUL; 2	OUL; 3	CRO; 1	CRO; 2	CRO; 3	SNE; 1	SNE; 2	SNE; 3	KNO; 1	KNO; 2	KNO; 3	ROC; 1	ROC; 2	ROC; 3	SIL; 1 WD	SIL; 2 WD	SIL; 3 WD	BRH; 1	BRH; 2	BRH; 3	NC	0
2014	Power Maxed Racing	Chevrolet Cruze 5dr	BRH; 1; 26	BRH; 2 Ret	BRH; 3 NC	DON; 1; 24	DON; 2 Ret	DON; 3; 19	THR; 1 Ret	THR; 2 Ret	THR; 3; 21	OUL; 1 Ret	OUL; 2 Ret	OUL; 3 Ret	CRO; 1	CRO; 2	CRO; 3	SNE; 1 NC	SNE; 2; 23	SNE; 3 Ret	KNO; 1; 22	KNO; 2 Ret	KNO; 3; 25	ROC; 1; 25	ROC; 2 NC	ROC; 3; 20	SIL; 1; 23	SIL; 2; 22	SIL; 3; 21	BRH; 1; 18	BRH; 2; 18	BRH; 3 Ret	31st	0
