= 2012 British Touring Car Championship =

55th season of the British Touring Car Championship

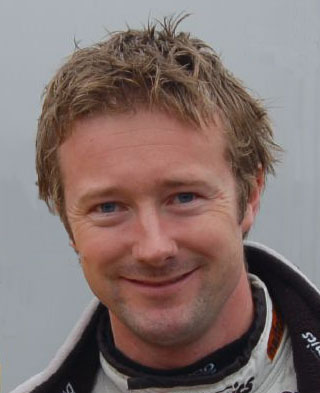
Gordon Shedden, the 2012 Drivers' Champion

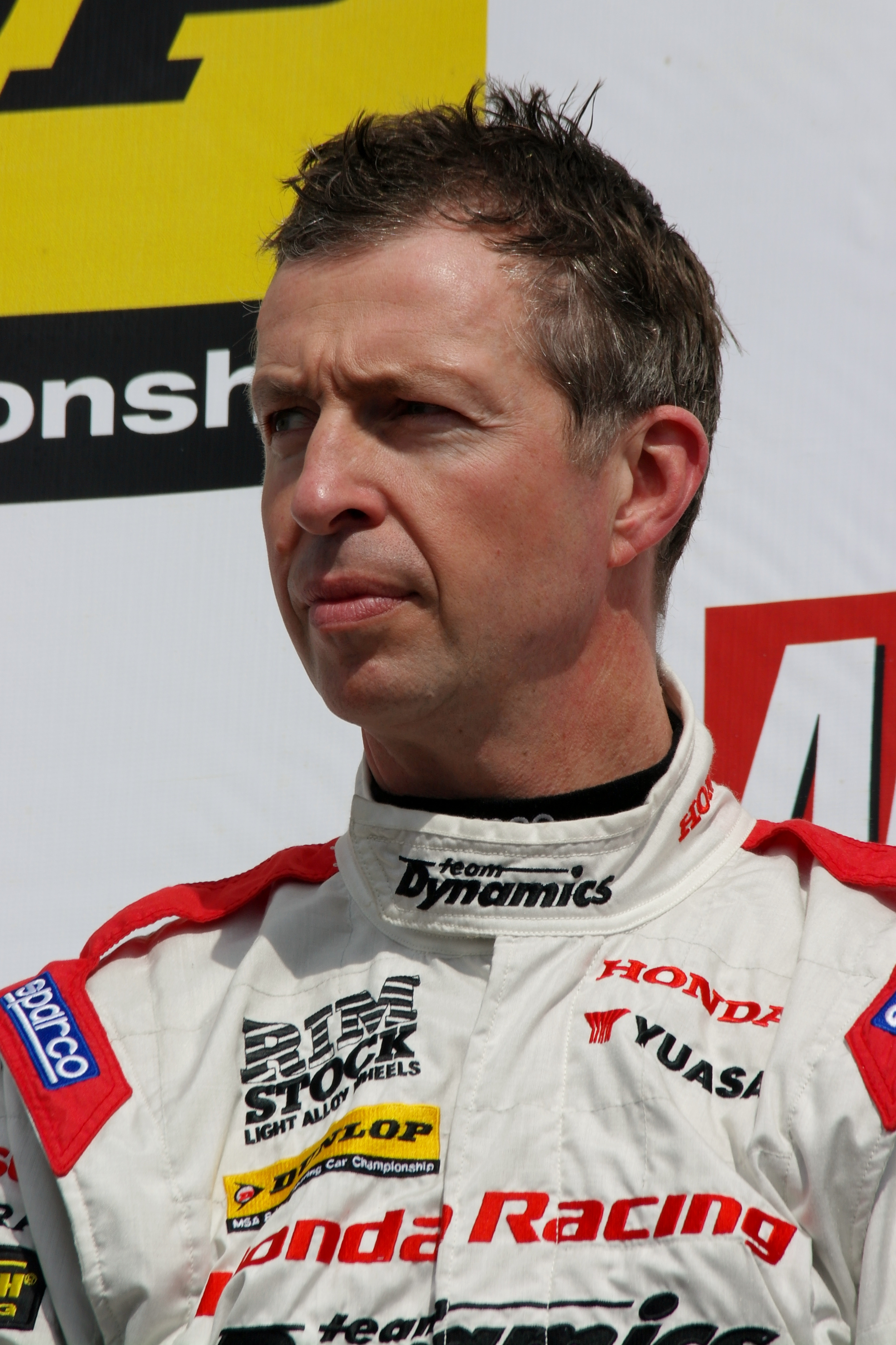
Matt Neal came runner-up to his teammate Gordon Shedden.

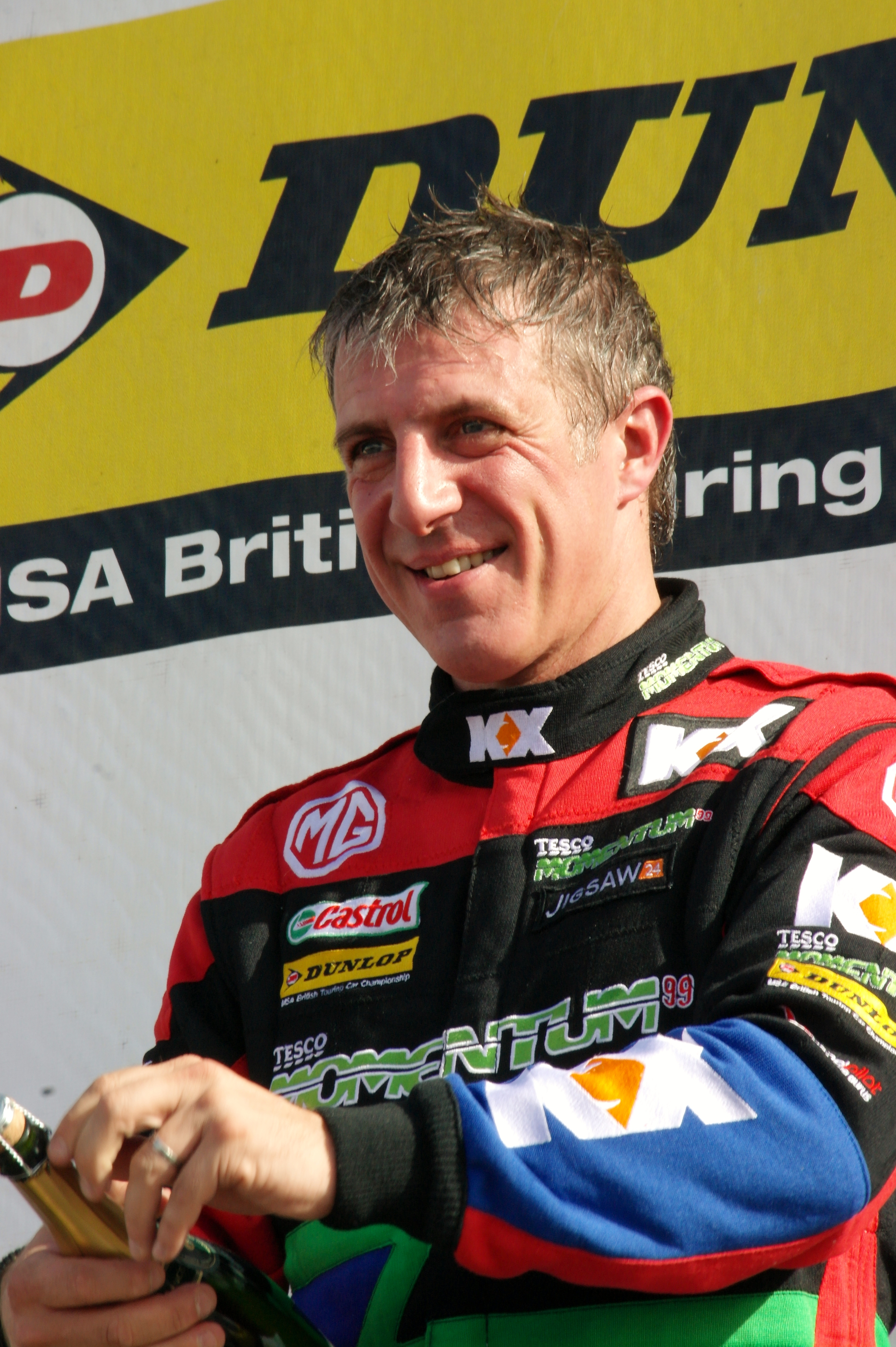
Jason Plato finished third for MG, narrowly missing out on second place in the final round.

The 2012 Dunlop MSA British Touring Car Championship was a multi-event motor racing championship for production-based touring cars held across England and Scotland. The championship features a mix of professional motor racing teams and privately funded amateur drivers competing in highly modified versions of family cars which are sold to the general public and conform to the technical regulations for the championship. It is one of the most popular domestic motor racing series in the United Kingdom, with an extensive program of support categories built up around the BTCC centrepiece. It was the 55th British Touring Car Championship (BTCC) season.

This was the second season that cars conforming to the Next Generation Touring Car (NGTC) specification were allowed to compete and the third and final season of the phased transition from the Super 2000 specification. The season will see teams compete with car chassis built to either NGTC or S2000 specification. Teams can choose to run the NGTC turbocharged engine or the Naturally Aspirated engines. The phased transition from S2000 to NGTC means that the organising body, TOCA, will maintain a performance equalisation between the two chassis specifications. They achieved this by monitoring the turbo boost pressures of all cars throughout the season, adjusting the pressure levels after every two rounds to maintain performance parity between all cars. The amount the turbo was adjusted was determined via a mathematical calculation based on race performance. The season was also the first season without cars built to the BTC Touring specification since 2000. A revised championship points system was introduced for the 2012 season, in which the top 15 cars scored championship points instead of the top 10 previously.

2011 series champion Matt Neal defended his title along with Honda, who defended and retained both the Teams' and Manufacturers' championships. Reigning Independent Drivers' champion James Nash didn't defend his title after graduating into the World Touring Car Championship. Triple Eight Race Engineering were the reigning Independent Teams' champions, but as they entered with returning manufacturer MG, they were ineligible to defend the Independents' championship.

Gordon Shedden claimed his first BTCC Drivers' title at the penultimate race of the year, Round 29 at the Brands Hatch GP circuit. Andrew Jordan claimed his first Independents' title during the same race.

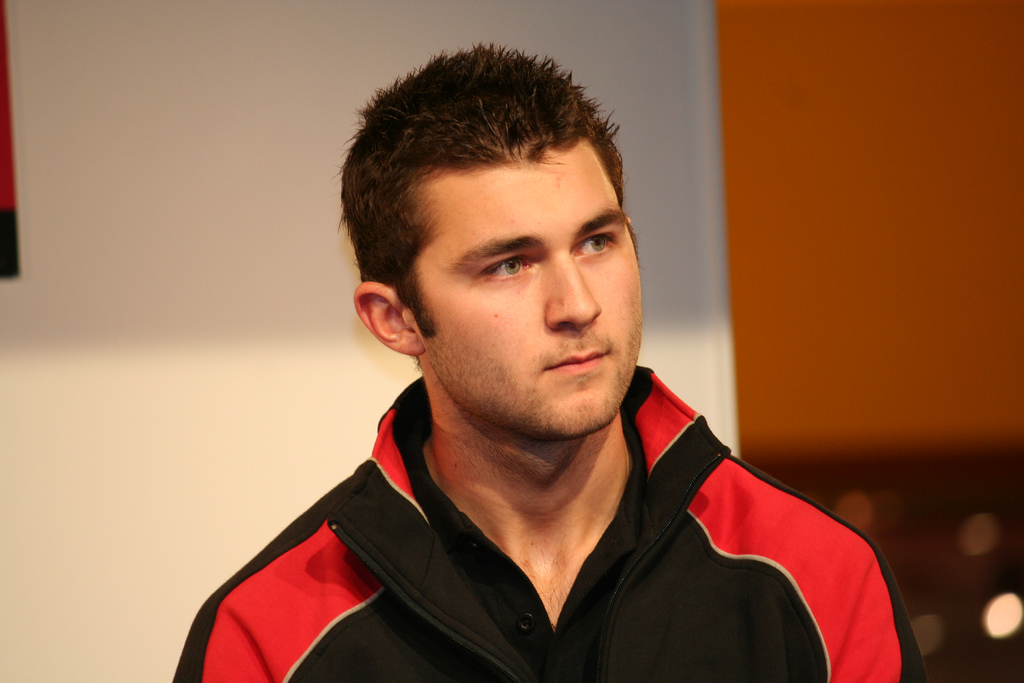
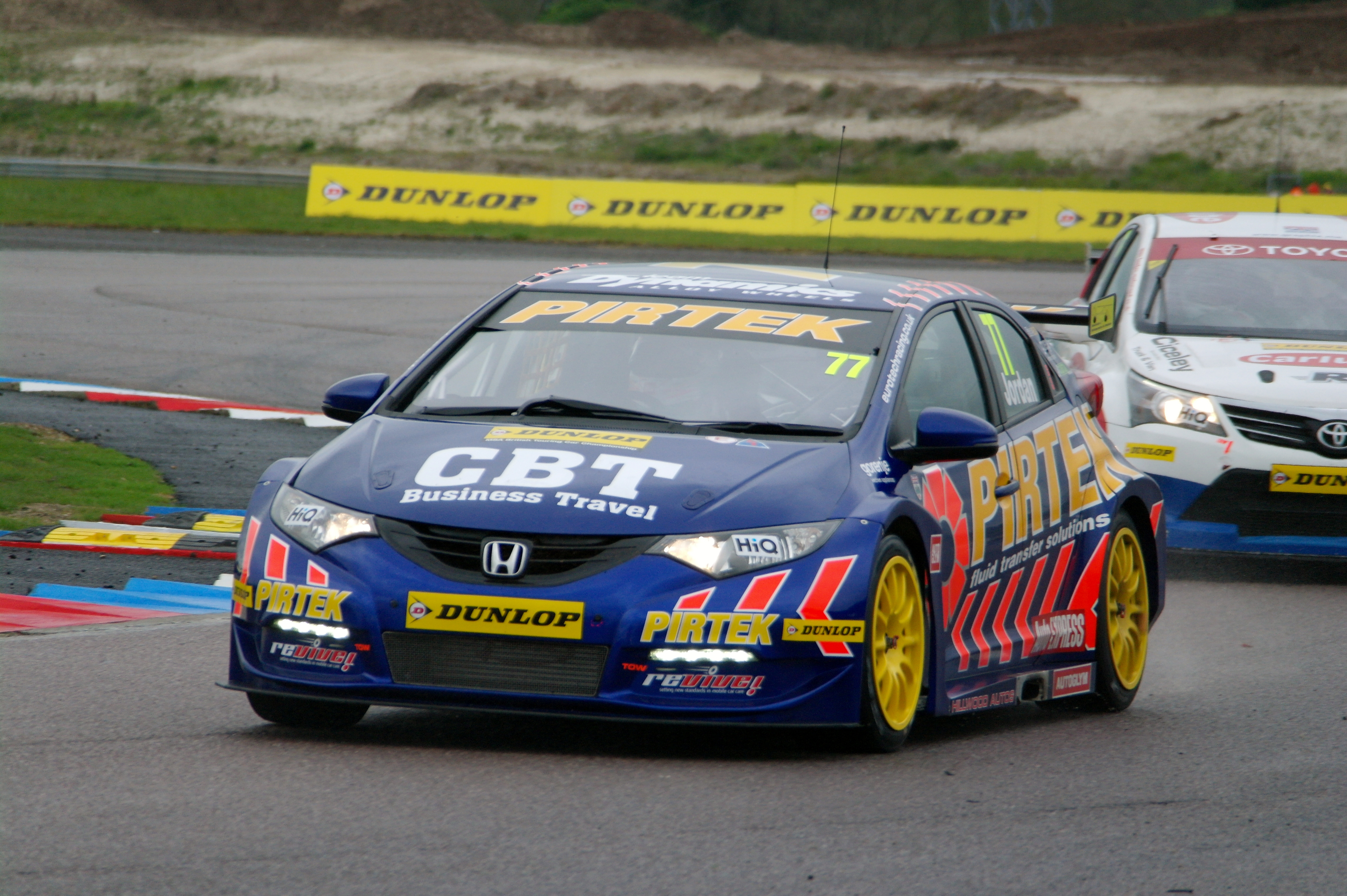
Andrew Jordan and his Pirtek Racing team won the Independents' Champions.

== Season report ==
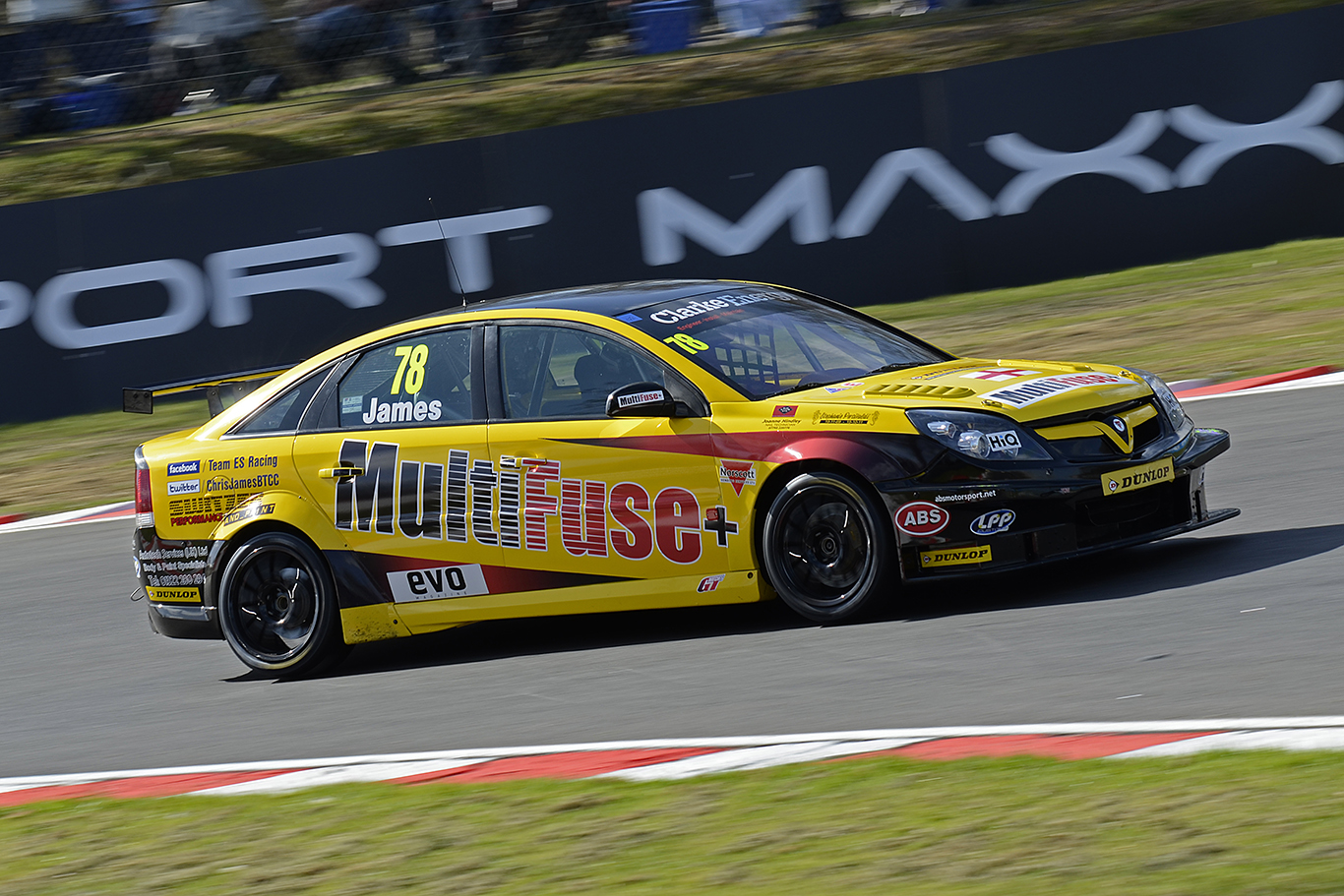
Chris James' Vauxhall Vectra during Round 1 at Brands Hatch Indy Circuit 2012

Round One (Races 1, 2 & 3) — Brands Hatch

Qualifying saw Dave Newsham secure his maiden pole position in the Super 2000 ex-888 Vauxhall Vectra. Defending champion Matt Neal secured the other front row sport in the brand new NGTC Civic. Race one, was won by Rob Collard in his BMW from Neal after Newsham and Jason Plato came together at the top of Paddock Hill Bend. Race two, saw the first win for a car built to NGTC rules. The Honda Yuasa Racing Team's Civic with Neal at the wheel prevailed after a race long battle with Plato's brand new MG6. Plato won an incident filled Race three which saw the race red flagged after a seven car pile up at Druids Bend, caused by oil spilled on the track from the damaged Ford Focus of Mat Jackson.

Round Two (Races 4, 5 & 6) — Donington Park

MG scored their first pole position since returning to the BTCC with Jason Plato during qualifying. Mat Jackson led home the Honda pair in race one, with Gordon Shedden leading Matt Neal and Mat Jackson home in race two, making five different winners from four teams in from the first five races of the season. However, this was not to continue as after a controversial final race of the day, where at the final corner Plato collided with Shedden, sending both cars of the track. This led to Mat Jackson crossing the line first, from Plato, then Shedden. However, Jackson's Focus was excluded from the race after a turbo boost irregularity and Plato was given a two-second penalty for his contact with Shedden, promoting Shedden to the race win.

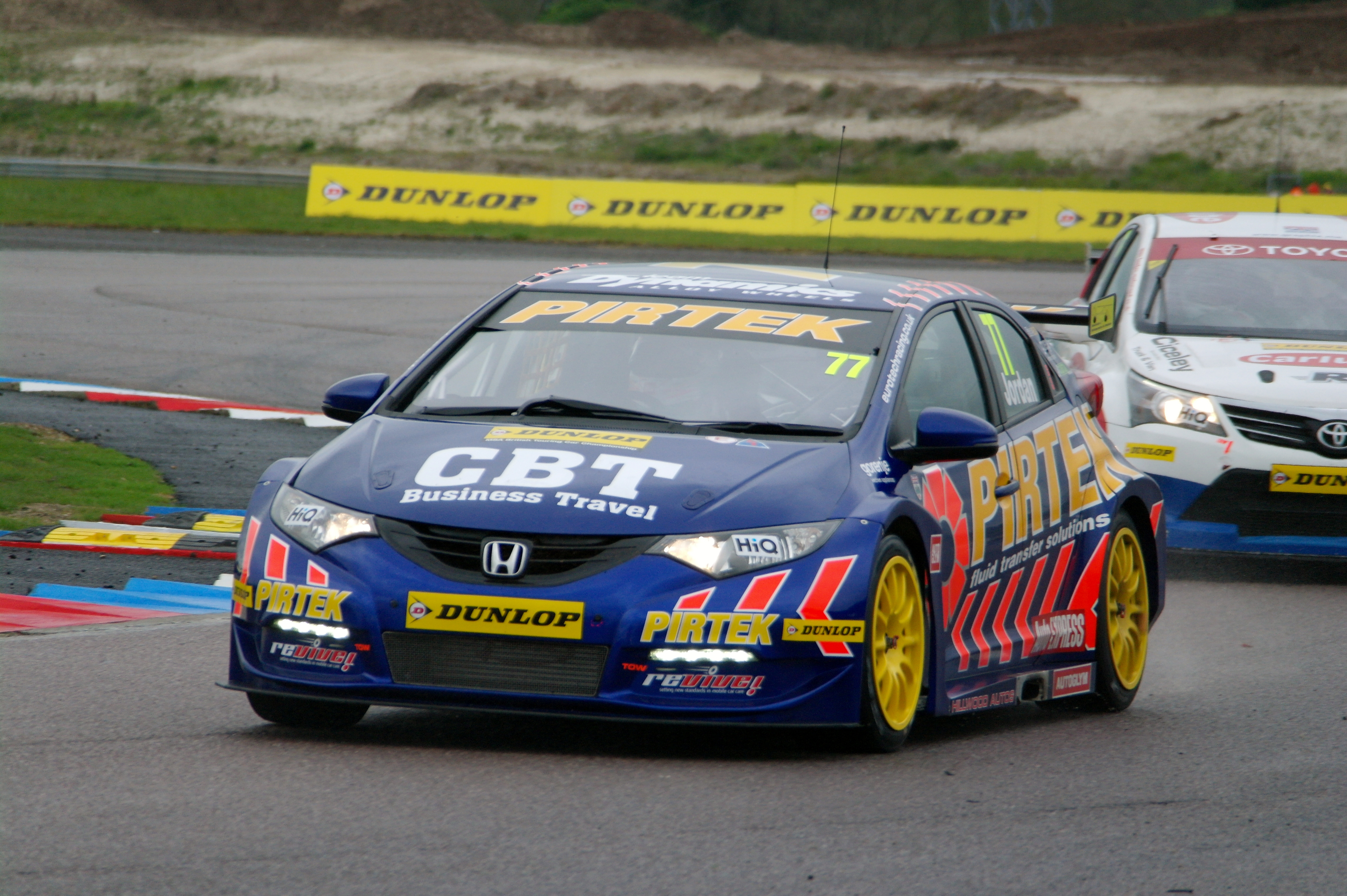
Pole-sitter Andrew Jordan, driving for Pirtek Racing at Thruxton.

Round Three (Races 7, 8 & 9) — Thruxton

Prior to the event, Thorney Motorsport announce that, due to lack of funds for both racing and development of their new NGTC Insignia, they were not going to take part at Thruxton. A damp qualifying gave Andrew Jordan and Pirtek their first pole of 2012. But, Saturday success would not convert into Sunday glory as a very wet race one saw Jordan slide into Jason Plato at the first turn, sending Jordan into the wall and out of the race. The race came to an abrupt end, when Liam Griffin crashed his car at turn one, causing a red flag. Mat Jackson therefore took his second win of the season, ahead of Dave Newsham and a recovering Plato. Weather condition had worsened for race two and was therefore started behind the safety car. It was Gordon Shedden who mastered the weather to come through the field to score his third win of the season. By the final race of the day, the condition had significantly improved, but it was still Shedden at the front leading home his teammate for a Honda one-two. All three fastest lap points at Thruxton went to Shedden, showing his speed in the tricky conditions.

Round Four (Races 10, 11 & 12) — Oulton Park

In the week leading up to round four, Rob Austin Racing revealed that, former FIA Formula Two Championship driver Will Bratt would make his championship debut in the team's second car. However, Rob Austin would miss the event due to ongoing repairs to his car, after a big crash at Thruxton. A circuit with damp patches made for an exciting qualifying session with several cars drifting and sliding off the track as they went round Cascades. The session belonged to Jason Plato though, setting a time 0.077 seconds faster than rival Matt Neal, making Plato the first repeat pole sitter of the season. But the pole sitter would not make it past turn one after Plato's car had a suspension failure on the warm up lap to the grid, causing his MG to be pushed off the grid before the race even begun. That left the door open for Matt Neal to take the race one win after passing the fast starting Rob Collard. The second race of the day, saw Neal's Honda teammate take top honours ahead of Pirtek's Andrew Jordan, with a recovering Plato, who started at the back of the field, finishing third. The final race of the day, saw Neal once again step onto the top step of the podium, making Honda Yuasa Racing the winning team from seven of the last eight races.

Round Five (Races 13, 14 & 15) — Croft

In the buildup to Croft, Paul O'Neill announced he would make a one-off return to racing in Speedworks Toyota Avensis, substituting for Tony Hughes. The point for pole position went to Matt Neal for the first time this season. Again, as at Oulton Park, Jason Plato was pushed off the grid in an exciting race one which saw Neal recover from a poor start to take his fourth win of the season ahead of eBay Motors BMW of Rob Collard and the second Honda Yuasa Civic of Gordon Shedden. The Honda teammates reversed their positions in race two, with Shedden finishing ahead of Neal. A fantastic drive from Rob Austin, in his NGTC Audi A4, saw him take the last step on the podium. In a reverse of fortune from the first race, Plato took the race three win after some intense on track action. Liam Griffin brought out the safety car, after crashing his Redstone Racing Focus into the wall, causing an engine fire. Andy Neate led the early part of the race, ahead of his MG teammate Plato. Neate, however, was unable to fend Plato off and subsequently fell back down the order, giving Plato the race win from Tom Onslow-Cole and Andrew Jordan.

Heading into the mid-season break, Matt Neal leads the drivers’ championship by a single point from his Honda teammate Gordon Shedden, with MG's Jason Plato in third, 29 points behind the leader. Honda Yuasa Racing hold a strong 213-point lead from eBay Motors in the teams championship as well as a 123-point lead from MG in the manufacturers' championship. Pirtek's Andrew Jordan is the leading Independent driver and eBay Motors, the leading Independent team.

Round Six (Races 16, 17 & 18) — Snetterton

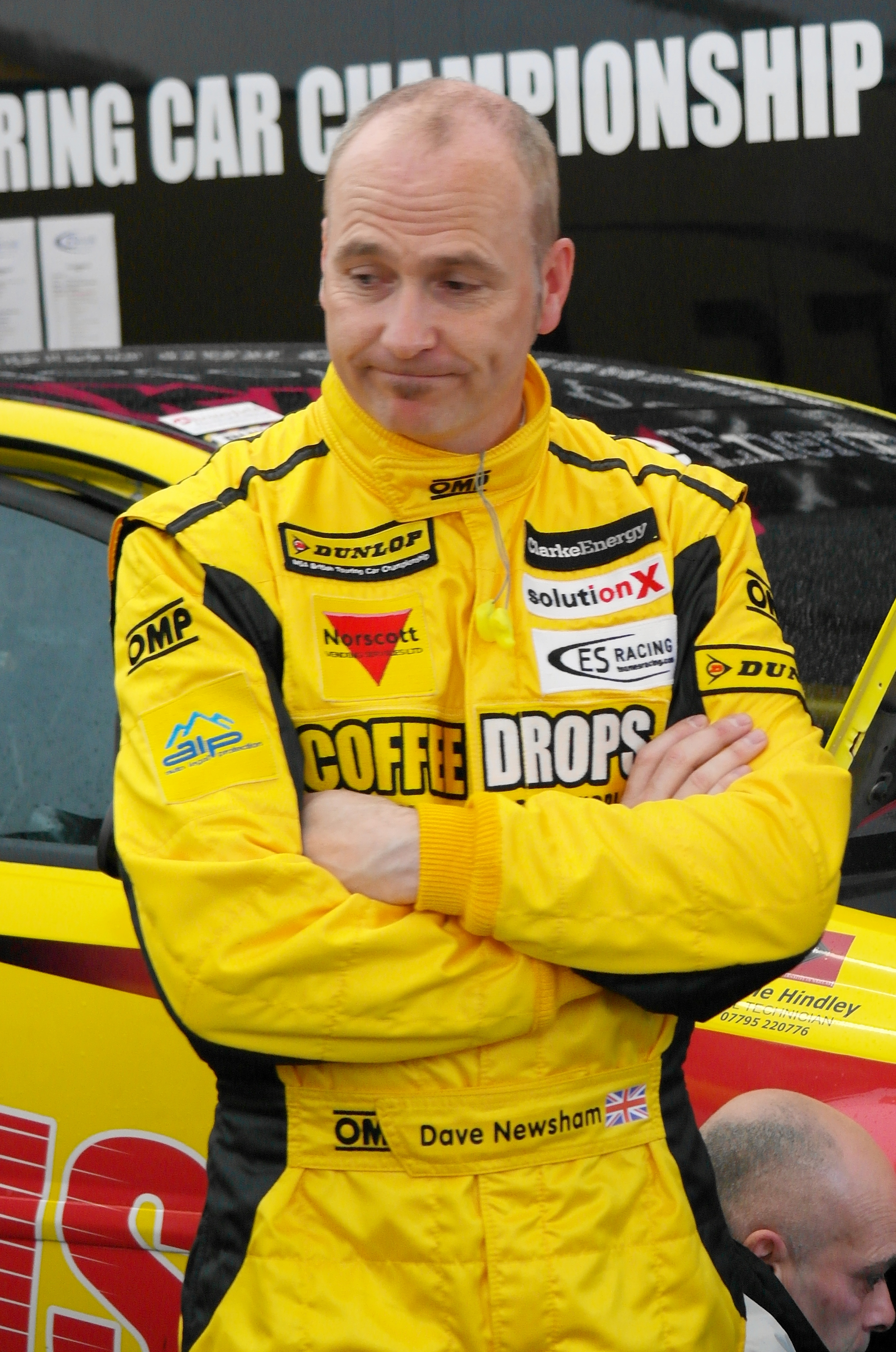
Dave Newsham took his first career win at Snetterton with his ES Racing Vauxhall Vectra

During the mid-season break leading up to Snetterton, Team HARD. announced that Tony Gilham would step aside to allow American SCCA World Challenge driver Robb Holland to make his series debut with the team. Holland will be the first driver from the USA to compete in the BTCC since Bill Gubelmann in 1975. Following on from this, Thorney Motorsport announced that they would return at Snetterton with Gilham at the wheel, after more extensive development of the Insignia. Liam Griffin pulled out of the meeting due to business commitments linked to the 2012 Summer Olympics, whilst a final surprise was the unveiling of a new NGTC Ford Focus ST, built by Motorbase Performance, to be driven by Mat Jackson.

Drama started almost immediately, when Gordon Shedden's Civic caught fire in the first free practice, causing the Scotsman to set no competitive time in qualifying, which belonged to Frank Wrathall, setting his maiden pole position and a new course record. Race one though saw Jason Plato win after starting second on the grid and taking the lead into the first turn. Wrathall managed to bring his Dynojet Toyota home second. Third place went to Andrew Jordan who narrowly beat Dave Newsham to the line after the two drivers came together several times during the final lap. However, Newsham would later be disqualified after being found underweight. This promoted Matt Neal to fourth, whilst his teammate Shedden removed from last on the grid to seventh. Debutant Holland failed to finish the race after crashing at turn one with Adam Morgan. Race two saw old rivals Plato and Neal once again come together amid frantic action for the win. Plato had led from the start; however Neal took the lead after sending the MG into a large slide coming through the penultimate corner. At the next turn, Plato returned the favour sending both Neal and himself off the track. This promoted Pirtek's Andrew Jordan to his first win of the season and Gordon Shedden up to second with Plato and Neal finishing third and fourth respectively. The reverse grid race three saw the ex-888 Vectras of Lea Wood and Dave Newsham lead the early laps in first and second respectively, until lap four, where Newsham took the lead where he stayed till the end, taking his first BTCC win. A career first podium wasn't on the cards though for Wood, after a gearbox failure with only three laps to go. This left Tom Onslow-Cole with second place and Shedden crossing the line in third place ahead of Jason Plato. However, post-race scrutineering found that Shedden's Honda had been over-boosting, thus disqualifying him from the results. This promoted Plato to third, whilst Neal recovered from and early spin, which sent him to the back of the field, to finish eighth.

Round Seven (Races 19, 20 & 21) — Knockhill

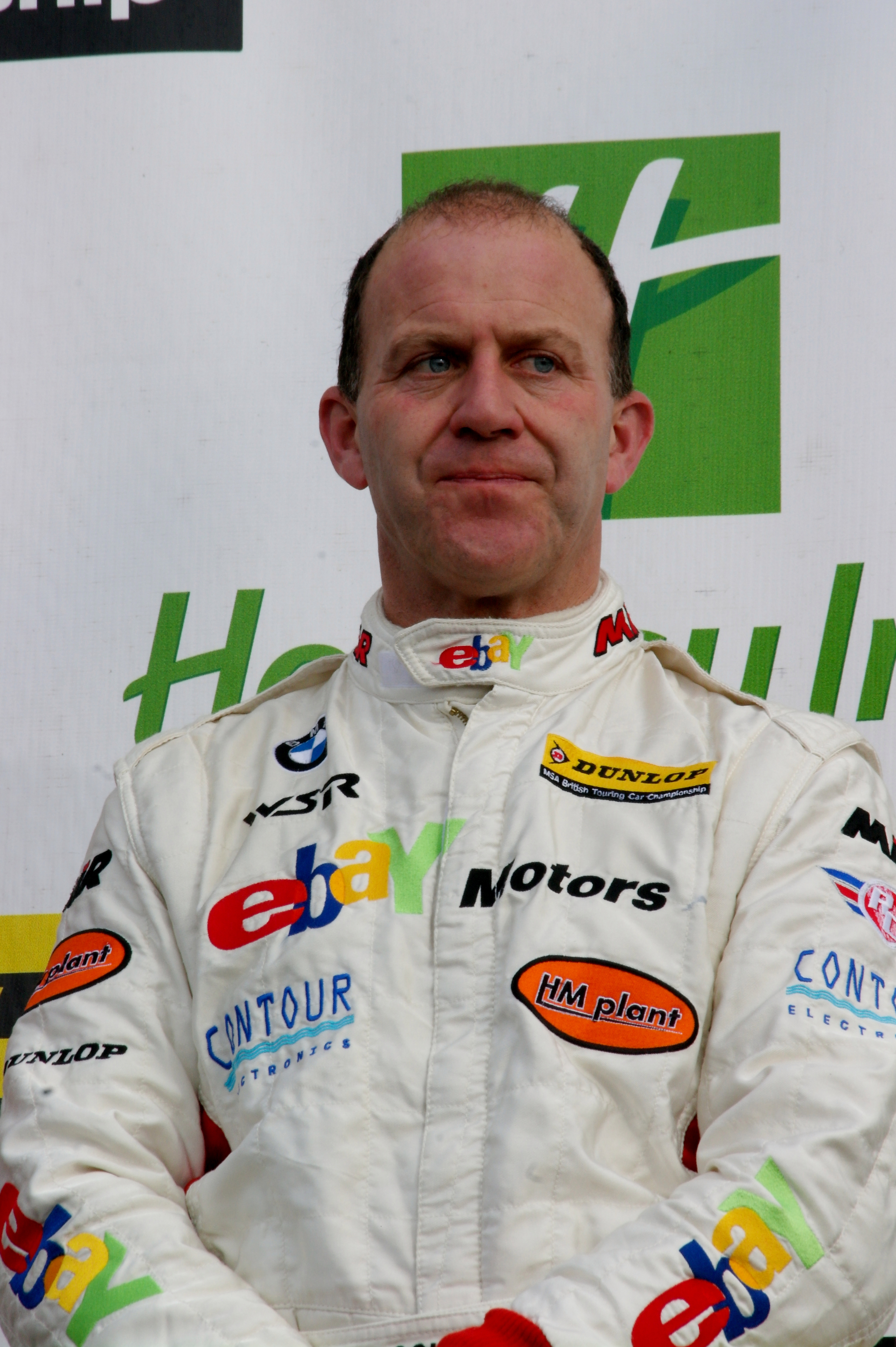
Rob Collard won the first two races of the day at Knockhill for eBay Motors.

In the run up to the BTCC's only Scottish round, Paul O'Neill announced he would deputise at Speedworks Motorsport, once again substituting for Tony Hughes. Robb Holland again replaced Tony Gilham at Team HARD., whilst Thorney Motorsport, Rob Austin Racing, AmD Tuning.com and Liam Griffin announced they would not be making the trip north of the border, each citing different reasons. Jason Plato took the pole position after a wet qualifying session, with the eBay Motors BMW of Rob Collard starting alongside. Árón Smith took a career best third place with his Redstone Racing Ford Focus.

Race one saw Rob Collard use his fast starting BMW to take the lead into turn one, with Jason Plato, Árón Smith and Tom Onslow-Cole fighting for second. On the second lap however, both MG KX Momentum Racing cars crashed out in separate incidents. Andy Neate came together with Lea Wood, damaging Neate's suspension, whilst Plato and Árón Smith tangled, sending Plato into the tyre wall. This paved the way for eBay Motors to score their first one-two result since 2009 with Collard and Onslow-Cole taking the top two positions from home favourite Gordon Shedden. Frank Wrathall retired his Toyota Avensis with engine issues and would be unable to take that start of the day's remaining races. Race two again went to Rob Collard, winning ahead of his teammate Tom Onslow-Cole with Gordon Shedden again in third. Matt Neal could only manage eighth place, whilst Plato, after starting form the back, finished 11th. There was drama for Mat Jackson after the exhaust on his new NGTC Ford Focus broke, filling the cabin with exhaust fumes, leading to his retirement and a trip to the track medical centre, with only a couple of laps remaining. The final race of the weekend saw Dave Newsham take a lights to flag win in front of his home crowd. Jeff Smith took his first ever podium, finishing a career best second after holding off a hard charging Matt Neal for most of the race. There was further frustration though for Jason Plato and Gordon Shedden. Plato suffered turbo issues on the formation laps meaning he failed to take the start, whilst Shedden retired early on with front end damage, caused by a trip across the grass, in avoidance of an incident between Árón Smith and Paul O'Neill.

Round Eight (Races 22, 23 & 24) — Rockingham

Prior to Rockingham, Team HARD. announced that VW Cup driver Howard Fuller would make his BTCC debut, replacing Robb Holland, whilst Welch Motorsport said they would miss Rockingham due to budget issues. Matt Neal's championship defence was made a little trickier, after it was announced that due to a motorcycle accident whilst on the road, he would have to compete with a broken right hand. The same hand that he had injured prior to Rockingham in 2011. Plato took an easy pole position after setting early in the session, a new qualifying lap record and a time which was 0.636 seconds faster than his nearest rival Gordon Shedden.

Plato continued his dominant display from qualifying by winning the first race of the day comfortably ahead of Andrew Jordan. However, proceedings would be shaken up for race two, which took place in very wet conditions. The rain allowed both Shedden and Neal to take any easy Honda one-two comfortably ahead of Plato in third. Jordan had initially led the race, but after an early safety car, to recover the stranded MG of Andy Neate, he overshot the turn two hairpin during the restart. He eventually recovered to finish seventh. Race three was again in wet condition albeit slightly improved condition from race two. However, the track was found to be incredibly slippery, especially around the banked turn one and turn four. Árón Smith led the race early on, before a massive accident for Pirtek Racing's Jeff Smith at turn one. Jeff Smith lost control of the back of his car, sending him spinning into the concrete wall of the banked turn one, wrecking the rear of his car, however Smith was unscathed. Árón Smith continued to lead after the restart, but was unable to hold off the hard charging Honda duo, finally finishing in fourth. The final podium mirror race two with Shedden winning his eighth race of the year, from Neal and Plato.

Round Nine (Races 25, 26 & 27) — Silverstone

Liam Griffin and Lea Wood both returned to the grid at Silverstone, Griffin's first race since the crash and subsequent fire at Croft. Thorney Motorsport announced their return, after last racing at Snetterton with former BTCC driver Chris Stockton, who last raced for BTC Racing in 2008. However, after taking part in both practice and qualifying, setting a time 21st fastest, Stockton was taken ill and replaced for the three races by Tony Gilham who raced for Thorney Motorsport during their last outing at Snetterton. The straight line nature of the Silverstone National circuit suited the cars with greater top speed, which meant that MG KX Momentum Racing and Jason Plato once again led the way in qualifying, taking Plato's pole tally this season to five. It was a very different story though for Honda Yuasa Racing Team and Pirtek Racing with their Honda Civics after the latest round of performance equalisation (based on the car's previous results and lap times) left the cars with reduced turbo pressure. This left Matt Neal starting in tenth place whilst championship leader Gordon Shedden could only manage 19th with maximum championship ballast. Elsewhere on the grid, Dave Newsham, Rob Austin and Will Bratt had their fastest times disallowed after race stewards deemed the drivers guilty of exceeding the track limits and gaining an advantage.

Race one saw an early safety car after Chris James, Liam Griffin and Andrew Jordan retired after separate incidents. Plato led the way early on, whilst a hard charging Mat Jackson in his NGTC Focus moved swiftly through the field and eventually into the lead. It looked like Jackson had done enough to secure the win, however mechanical issues forced a retirement four laps from the chequered flag. This gave the win back to Plato with Dave Newsham and Árón Smith behind. Race two once again saw an impressive performance from Redstone Racing's NGTC Focus, after coming from 17th on the grid to win the race. Once again the early leader was Plato, but retired from the lead with as sensor failure slowing his car. The third race saw Plato emulate Jacksons drive from the back in race two to take the win ahead of Jackson. Elsewhere, it was a day to forget for Matt Neal after retiring from race one with turbo issues, having his car burst into flames during race two and crashing at Brooklands Corner in the third race.

This left four driver in with a chance of securing the Drivers' Title heading into the final round: the Honda Yuasa Racing Team pair of Matt Neal and Gordon Shedden, MG KX Momentum Racing's Jason Plato and Pirtek Racing's Andrew Jordan. Whilst in both Independents' championships, Andrew Jordan, Rob Collard, Mat Jackson and Tom Onslow-Cole remain mathematically in the drivers title chase along with their respective teams who are battling for the Independent Teams' championship.

Round Ten (Races 28, 29 & 30) — Brands Hatch

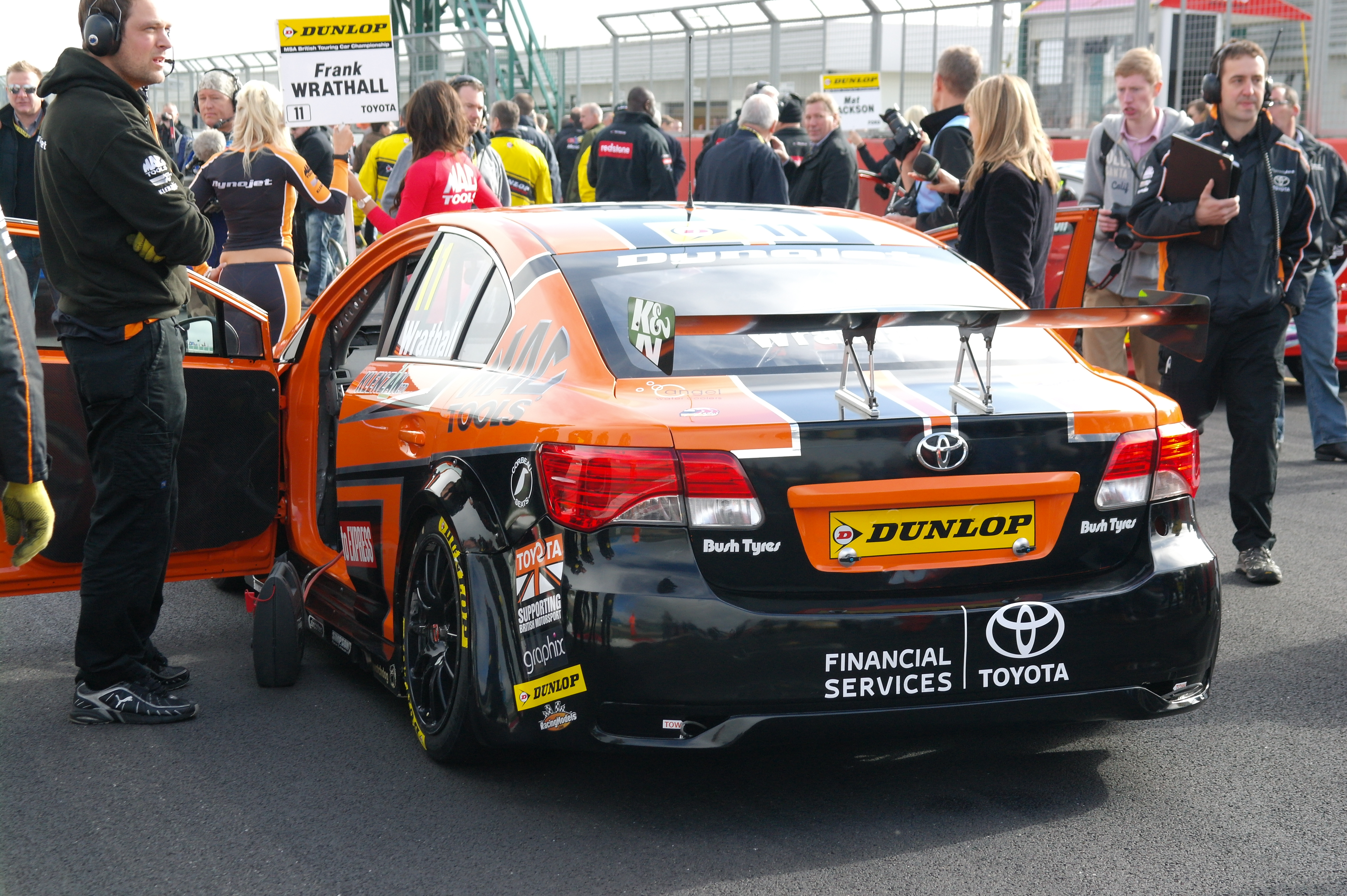
Frank Wrathall and his NGTC Toyota Avensis scored his debut win during the final race of the season.

Prior to the final round, there were several team and driver changes. Rob Austin Racing changed its name to www.wixracing.co.uk following sponsorship from Wix Filters, whilst Thorney Motorsport sold its Vauxhall Insignia's to Team HARD. with Tony Gilham running the Insignia and debutant Aaron Williamson using the teams Honda Civic. The final qualifying session of 2012 saw the S2000 chassis of the eBay Motors BMW 320si take pole position in the hands of Tom Onslow-Cole after narrowly beating Andrew Jordan in the final seconds of the session. Matt Neal lined up third, with Jason Plato fifth and championship leader Gordon Shedden only managing seventh.

Race day saw a rain soaked circuit which would play to the strengths of the Honda Teams and as such race one was won by Neal after passing initial leader Onslow-Cole who managed to finish third. Jordan was Neal's closest competition finishing half a second behind, however this was not enough point to remain in the overall drivers title chase. Elsewhere, championship leader Shedden held on to his lead, finishing fifth, with Plato struggling in the wet conditions down in eighth. A close fought race two, which included two safety car periods, saw the debut win for Árón Smith in his Redstone Racing Ford Focus ST and the last competitive win for a Super 2000 chassis in the BTCC. Gordon Shedden improved on his first race result to finish second which was enough to crown him the Drivers' Champion, after rivals Neal and Plato finished third and fifth respectively. The race also saw the crowning of the Independents Drivers' Champion, after Rob Collard spun and crashed his eBay Motors BMW out of the race on the first lap, handing the title to Jordan. The final race of the day and of the season saw a début win for Frank Wrathall and the NGTC Toyota Avensis. 2011 champion Matt Neal secured runner-up spot in this year's championship by finishing second ahead of champion Shedden in third and Plato in eight. Fourth place for Jordan was also enough to secure Pirtek Racing their first Independent Teams' Championship ahead of eBay Motors.

== Teams and drivers ==
All teams have elected to use the Next Generation Touring Car 2.0-litre turbocharged direct injection engine.

Team	Car	Engine	No.	Drivers	Rounds
Constructor NGTC Entries
Honda Yuasa Racing Team	Honda Civic	Honda/Neil Brown	1	(United Kingdom) Matt Neal	All
Honda Yuasa Racing Team	Honda Civic	Honda/Neil Brown	52	(United Kingdom) Gordon Shedden	All
MG KX Momentum Racing	MG6 GT	TOCA/Swindon	44	(United Kingdom) Andy Neate	All
MG KX Momentum Racing	MG6 GT	TOCA/Swindon	99	(United Kingdom) Jason Plato	All
Independent NGTC Entries
Redstone Racing	Ford Focus ST Mk.III	Ford/Mountune	4	(United Kingdom) Mat Jackson	6–10
Dynojet	Toyota Avensis	Toyota/XCtechR	11	(United Kingdom) Frank Wrathall	All
Welch Motorsport with Sopp+Sopp	Proton Persona	TOCA/Swindon	12	(United Kingdom) Daniel Welch	1–7, 9–10
Rob Austin Racing	Audi A4	Audi/Lehmann	13	(United Kingdom) Rob Austin	1–3, 5–6, 8–10
Rob Austin Racing	Audi A4	Audi/Lehmann	14	(United Kingdom) Will Bratt	4–5, 8–10
Thorney Motorsport	Vauxhall Insignia VXR-R	TOCA/Swindon	28	(United Kingdom) Chris Stockton	9
Thorney Motorsport	Vauxhall Insignia VXR-R	TOCA/Swindon	66	(United Kingdom) John Thorne	1–2
Thorney Motorsport	Vauxhall Insignia VXR-R	TOCA/Swindon	34	(United Kingdom) Tony Gilham	6, 9
Team HARD.	Vauxhall Insignia VXR-R	TOCA/Swindon	34	(United Kingdom) Tony Gilham	10
Speedworks Motorsport	Toyota Avensis	TOCA/Swindon	29	(United Kingdom) Paul O'Neill	5, 7
Speedworks Motorsport	Toyota Avensis	TOCA/Swindon	33	(United Kingdom) Adam Morgan	All
Speedworks Motorsport	Toyota Avensis	TOCA/Swindon	50	(United Kingdom) Tony Hughes	1–4, 6, 8–10
Pirtek Racing	Honda Civic	Honda/Neil Brown	55	(United Kingdom) Jeff Smith	All
Pirtek Racing	Honda Civic	Honda/Neil Brown	77	(United Kingdom) Andrew Jordan	All
Independent S2000 Entries (NGTC Engine)
Redstone Racing	Ford Focus ST Mk.II	Ford/Mountune	4	(United Kingdom) Mat Jackson	1–5
Redstone Racing	Ford Focus ST Mk.II	Ford/Mountune	5	(Republic of Ireland) Árón Smith	All
Redstone Racing	Ford Focus ST Mk.II	Ford/Mountune	6	(United Kingdom) Liam Griffin	1–5, 9–10
eBay Motors	BMW 320si	BMW/Neil Brown	8	(United Kingdom) Rob Collard	All
eBay Motors	BMW 320si	BMW/Neil Brown	18	(United Kingdom) Nick Foster	All
eBay Motors	BMW 320si	BMW/Neil Brown	38	(United Kingdom) Tom Onslow-Cole	All
Team ES Racing.com	Vauxhall Vectra	TOCA/Swindon	17	(United Kingdom) Dave Newsham	All
Team ES Racing.com	Vauxhall Vectra	TOCA/Swindon	78	(United Kingdom) Chris James	All
Team HARD.	Honda Civic	Honda/Neil Brown	22	(United Kingdom) Howard Fuller	8–9
Team HARD.	Honda Civic	Honda/Neil Brown	27	(United Kingdom) Aaron Williamson	10
Team HARD.	Honda Civic	Honda/Neil Brown	34	(United Kingdom) Tony Gilham	1–5
Team HARD.	Honda Civic	Honda/Neil Brown	35	(United States) Robb Holland	6–7
BINZ Racing	Vauxhall Vectra	TOCA/Swindon	43	(United Kingdom) Lea Wood	1–7, 9–10
AmD Tuning.com	Volkswagen Golf	Volkswagen/Lehmann	48	(United Kingdom) Ollie Jackson	1–6, 8–10

=== Driver changes ===
Changed teams

- Dave Newsham moved from Special Tuning Racing to drive for Team ES Racing.
- After debuting for Triple 8 Race Engineering during 2011, both Árón Smith and Ollie Jackson contested full seasons in 2012. Jackson joined the AmD Tuning.com team, and Smith joined Motorbase Performance.
- Andy Neate and Jason Plato joined MG KX Momentum Racing, having left Team Aon and Silverline Chevrolet respectively.
- Tom Onslow-Cole moved from Team Aon to eBay Motors.
- Having started the year as a pundit for ITV Sport, Paul O'Neill contested two rounds with Speedworks Motorsport at Croft and Knockhill.
- With Robb Holland racing the Honda Civic for Team HARD. at Snetterton, Tony Gilham drove the second Vauxhall Insignia for Thorney Motorsport. He later drove for Thorney Motorsport as a last minute replacement for Chris Stockton at Silverstone.

Entering/re-entering BTCC

- Mark Hazell was going to join the series, driving an Audi A4 for Rob Austin Racing. He failed to participate at the season-opening round at Brands Hatch; giving his car up to team boss Rob Austin as the second A4 was not ready. He later announced that he would not compete in the series for personal reasons.
- Rob Hedley was supposed to enter the series during the 2012 season, with Thorney Motorsport, but this did not materialise.
- Adam Morgan entered the series after winning a fully paid drive as a result of winning the Ginetta GT Supercup. He later joined Speedworks Motorsport in a second Toyota Avensis.
- Former FIA Formula Two Championship driver Will Bratt made his series debut with Rob Austin Racing at Oulton Park.
- American SCCA World Challenge driver Robb Holland made his series debut with Team HARD. at Snetterton and Knockhill.
- Former BTCC driver Chris Stockton, announced his return with Thorney Motorsport at Silverstone and Brands Hatch GP. Stockton last raced for BTC Racing in the 2008 season. However at Silverstone, after taking part in both practice and qualifying he was taken ill and replaced for the races by Tony Gilham.
- Aaron Williamson graduated to the BTCC with Team HARD. for the season finale at Brands Hatch, after competing in the Renault Clio Cup UK.

Leaving BTCC

- Tom Chilton and James Nash both left the series to race for Arena Motorsport in the WTCC.
- Tom Boardman left the series to race for Special Tuning Racing in the WTCC.
- Alex MacDowall left the series to race for Bamboo Engineering in the WTCC.

=== Team changes ===
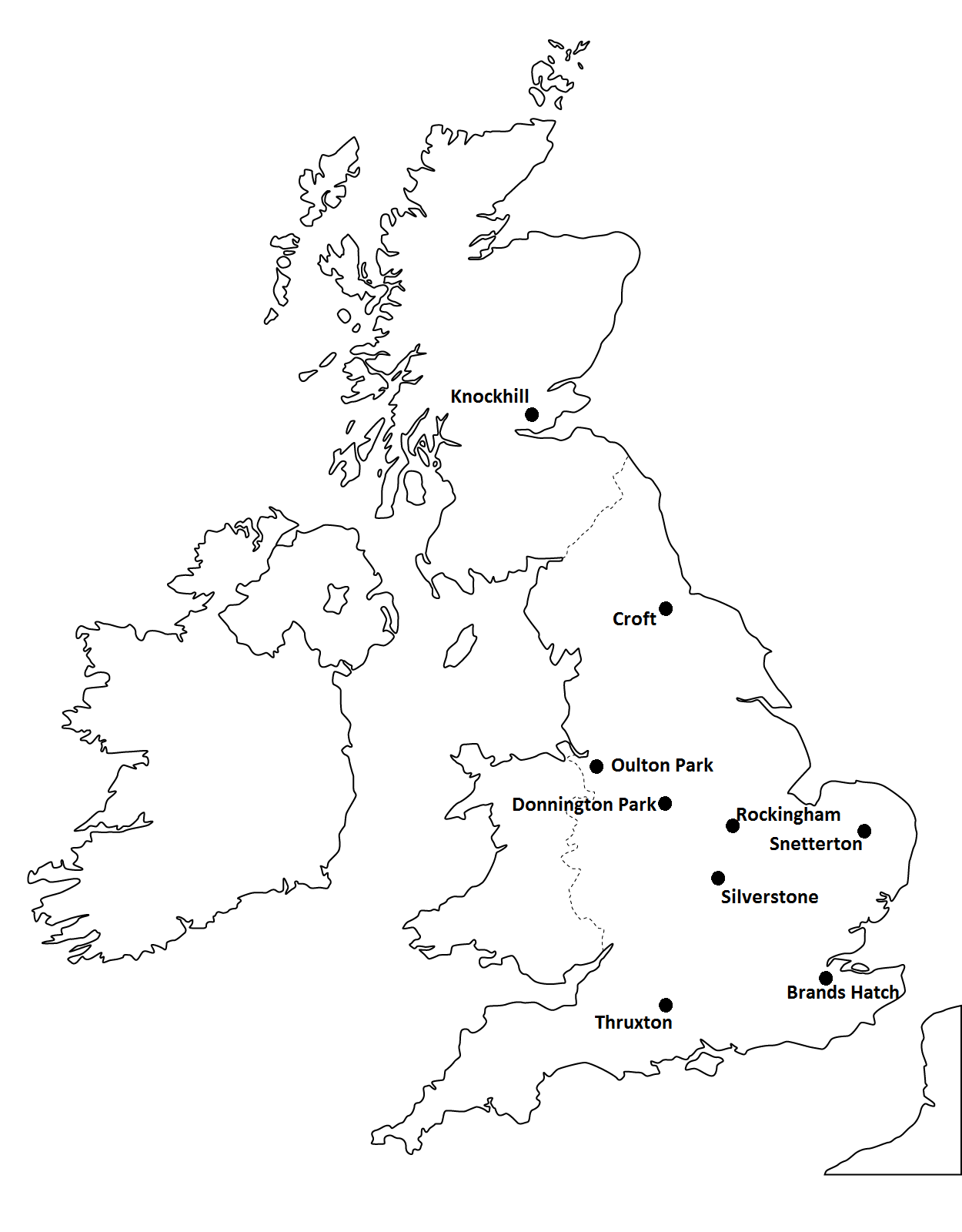
Circuits for the 2012 season

- TH Motorsport were supposed to re-enter the BTCC running a NGTC Škoda Octavia vRS, but due to a lack of budget, this did not occur.
- The Honda Racing Team moved to the brand new ninth generation Honda Civic built to full NGTC spec. They are the first Manufacturer backed team to run fully to the Next Generation Touring Car specification.
- On 20 September 2011, Triple 8 Race Engineering announced that they are going to swap to a new car built to full Next Generation Touring Car specification for 2012. On 25 January 2012, they announced that they will enter two NGTC MG6 GT cars for Jason Plato and Andy Neate under the MG KX Momentum banner with works support from MG Motor.
- On 21 September 2011, Pirtek Racing announced that they are going to swap to a new car built to full NGTC spec. On 6 October 2011, the team announced they would run Honda Civics as a satellite team of Team Dynamics.
- On 18 October 2011, Welch Automotive announced that they were expanding their team to two cars for the 2012 season. However, the team ran only one car all season.
- On 5 November 2011, Team ES Racing announced that they will switch to NGTC cars. However, on 21 January 2012 it was announced that they will use ex-Triple Eight Vauxhall Vectra with NGTC engines for drivers Chris James and Dave Newsham, with the possibility of a third car running later in the season.
- On 26 January 2012, Lea Wood announced that he will compete with an ex-Pirtek Racing Vauxhall Vectra with a TOCA NGTC engine.
- On 1 February 2012, RML announced that they would not enter a team in the 2012 championship, opting instead to focus on the WTCC and the team's championship defences. Team Aon also left the series in order to concentrate their efforts in WTCC.
- Special Tuning Racing also moved to the WTCC, and although it was reported that the team will run a pair of cars in the BTCC, this didn't happen.
- In preparation for the 2013 season, on 16 October 2012 it was announced that Tony Gilham had purchased the Thorney Motorsport Vauxhall Insignia cars and ran them under the Team HARD. banner at the last round at Brands Hatch.

== Race calendar and results ==
The provisional calendar was announced by the championship organisers on 20 September 2011, with no major changes from 2011. All races were held in the United Kingdom.

Round		Circuit	Date	Pole position	Fastest lap	Winning driver	Winning team	Winning Independent
1	R1	Brands Hatch (Indy Circuit, Kent)	1 April	(United Kingdom) Dave Newsham	(United Kingdom) Tom Onslow-Cole	(United Kingdom) Rob Collard	eBay Motors	(United Kingdom) Rob Collard
1	R2	Brands Hatch (Indy Circuit, Kent)	1 April		(United Kingdom) Jason Plato	(United Kingdom) Matt Neal	Honda Yuasa Racing Team	(United Kingdom) Andrew Jordan
1	R3	Brands Hatch (Indy Circuit, Kent)	1 April		(United Kingdom) Jason Plato	(United Kingdom) Jason Plato	MG KX Momentum Racing	(United Kingdom) Andrew Jordan
2	R4	Donington Park (National Circuit, Leicestershire)	15 April	(United Kingdom) Jason Plato	(United Kingdom) Mat Jackson	(United Kingdom) Mat Jackson	Redstone Racing	(United Kingdom) Mat Jackson
2	R5	Donington Park (National Circuit, Leicestershire)	15 April		(United Kingdom) Tom Onslow-Cole	(United Kingdom) Gordon Shedden	Honda Yuasa Racing Team	(United Kingdom) Mat Jackson
2	R6	Donington Park (National Circuit, Leicestershire)	15 April		(United Kingdom) Jason Plato	(United Kingdom) Gordon Shedden	Honda Yuasa Racing Team	(United Kingdom) Tony Gilham
3	R7	Thruxton Circuit (Hampshire)	29 April	(United Kingdom) Andrew Jordan	(United Kingdom) Gordon Shedden	(United Kingdom) Mat Jackson	Redstone Racing	(United Kingdom) Mat Jackson
3	R8	Thruxton Circuit (Hampshire)	29 April		(United Kingdom) Gordon Shedden	(United Kingdom) Gordon Shedden	Honda Yuasa Racing Team	(United Kingdom) Mat Jackson
3	R9	Thruxton Circuit (Hampshire)	29 April		(United Kingdom) Gordon Shedden	(United Kingdom) Gordon Shedden	Honda Yuasa Racing Team	(United Kingdom) Frank Wrathall
4	R10	Oulton Park (Island Circuit, Cheshire)	10 June	(United Kingdom) Jason Plato	(United Kingdom) Andrew Jordan	(United Kingdom) Matt Neal	Honda Yuasa Racing Team	(United Kingdom) Andrew Jordan
4	R11	Oulton Park (Island Circuit, Cheshire)	10 June		(United Kingdom) Gordon Shedden	(United Kingdom) Gordon Shedden	Honda Yuasa Racing Team	(United Kingdom) Andrew Jordan
4	R12	Oulton Park (Island Circuit, Cheshire)	10 June		(United Kingdom) Tom Onslow-Cole	(United Kingdom) Matt Neal	Honda Yuasa Racing Team	(United Kingdom) Tom Onslow-Cole
5	R13	Croft Circuit (North Yorkshire)	24 June	(United Kingdom) Matt Neal	(United Kingdom) Tom Onslow-Cole	(United Kingdom) Matt Neal	Honda Yuasa Racing Team	(United Kingdom) Rob Collard
5	R14	Croft Circuit (North Yorkshire)	24 June		(United Kingdom) Andrew Jordan	(United Kingdom) Gordon Shedden	Honda Yuasa Racing Team	(United Kingdom) Rob Austin
5	R15	Croft Circuit (North Yorkshire)	24 June		(United Kingdom) Jason Plato	(United Kingdom) Jason Plato	MG KX Momentum Racing	(United Kingdom) Tom Onslow-Cole
6	R16	Snetterton Motor Racing Circuit (300 Circuit, Norfolk)	12 August	(United Kingdom) Frank Wrathall	(United Kingdom) Jason Plato	(United Kingdom) Jason Plato	MG KX Momentum Racing	(United Kingdom) Frank Wrathall
6	R17	Snetterton Motor Racing Circuit (300 Circuit, Norfolk)	12 August		(United Kingdom) Gordon Shedden	(United Kingdom) Andrew Jordan	Pirtek Racing	(United Kingdom) Andrew Jordan
6	R18	Snetterton Motor Racing Circuit (300 Circuit, Norfolk)	12 August		(United Kingdom) Dave Newsham	(United Kingdom) Dave Newsham	Team ES Racing.com	(United Kingdom) Dave Newsham
7	R19	Knockhill Racing Circuit (Fife)	26 August	(United Kingdom) Jason Plato	(United Kingdom) Tom Onslow-Cole	(United Kingdom) Rob Collard	eBay Motors	(United Kingdom) Rob Collard
7	R20	Knockhill Racing Circuit (Fife)	26 August		(United Kingdom) Rob Collard	(United Kingdom) Rob Collard	eBay Motors	(United Kingdom) Rob Collard
7	R21	Knockhill Racing Circuit (Fife)	26 August		(United Kingdom) Tom Onslow-Cole	(United Kingdom) Dave Newsham	Team ES Racing.com	(United Kingdom) Dave Newsham
8	R22	Rockingham Motor Speedway (International Super Sports Car Circuit, Northamptonshire)	23 September	(United Kingdom) Jason Plato	(United Kingdom) Jason Plato	(United Kingdom) Jason Plato	MG KX Momentum Racing	(United Kingdom) Andrew Jordan
8	R23	Rockingham Motor Speedway (International Super Sports Car Circuit, Northamptonshire)	23 September		(United Kingdom) Gordon Shedden	(United Kingdom) Gordon Shedden	Honda Yuasa Racing Team	(United Kingdom) Mat Jackson
8	R24	Rockingham Motor Speedway (International Super Sports Car Circuit, Northamptonshire)	23 September		(United Kingdom) Gordon Shedden	(United Kingdom) Gordon Shedden	Honda Yuasa Racing Team	(United Kingdom) Andrew Jordan
9	R25	Silverstone Circuit (National Circuit, Northamptonshire)	7 October	(United Kingdom) Jason Plato	(United Kingdom) Mat Jackson	(United Kingdom) Jason Plato	MG KX Momentum Racing	(United Kingdom) Dave Newsham
9	R26	Silverstone Circuit (National Circuit, Northamptonshire)	7 October		(United Kingdom) Mat Jackson	(United Kingdom) Mat Jackson	Redstone Racing	(United Kingdom) Mat Jackson
9	R27	Silverstone Circuit (National Circuit, Northamptonshire)	7 October		(United Kingdom) Jason Plato	(United Kingdom) Jason Plato	MG KX Momentum Racing	(United Kingdom) Mat Jackson
10	R28	Brands Hatch (Grand Prix Circuit, Kent)	21 October	(United Kingdom) Tom Onslow-Cole	(United Kingdom) Matt Neal	(United Kingdom) Matt Neal	Honda Yuasa Racing Team	(United Kingdom) Andrew Jordan
10	R29	Brands Hatch (Grand Prix Circuit, Kent)	21 October		(United Kingdom) Gordon Shedden	(Republic of Ireland) Árón Smith	Redstone Racing	(Republic of Ireland) Árón Smith
10	R30	Brands Hatch (Grand Prix Circuit, Kent)	21 October		(United Kingdom) Tom Onslow-Cole	(United Kingdom) Frank Wrathall	Dynojet	(United Kingdom) Frank Wrathall

== Championship standings ==
The 2012 season introduced a revised championship points system in which the top 15 cars will score championship points.

Points system
**1st**	**2nd**	**3rd**	**4th**	**5th**	**6th**	**7th**	**8th**	**9th**	**10th**	**11th**	**12th**	**13th**	**14th**	**15th**	Fastest lap	Lead a lap
20	17	15	13	11	10	9	8	7	6	5	4	3	2	1	1	1

- No driver may collect more than one "Lead a Lap" point per race no matter how many laps they lead.
- Race 1 polesitter receives 1 point.

=== Drivers' Championship ===
(key)

Pos	Driver	BHI			DON			THR			OUL			CRO			SNE			KNO			ROC			SIL			BHGP			Pts
1	(United Kingdom) Gordon Shedden	5	Ret	DSQ	2	1*	1*	6	1*	1*	4	1*	4	3*	1*	6	7	2	DSQ	3	3	Ret	3	1*	1*	7	7	6	5	2	3	408
2	(United Kingdom) Matt Neal	2*	1*	7	3	2	Ret	10	5	2*	1*	**5**	1*	**1***	**2***	4	4	4	8	7	8	3	6	2*	2*	Ret	Ret	Ret	1*	**3**	2	387
3	(United Kingdom) Jason Plato	4	3*	1*	**4**	NC	2	3	2	4	**NC**	3	2	NC	7	1*	1*	**3***	3	**Ret**	11	Ret	**1***	**3**	3	**1***	**Ret***	1*	8	5	8	377
4	(United Kingdom) Andrew Jordan	6	2	2*	6	5	6	**Ret**	10	5	2	2	Ret	4	4	3	3	1*	5	9	7	4	2	7*	4	Ret	9	7	2	4	4	346
5	(United Kingdom) Rob Collard	1*	**6***	6*	10*	8	4*	4	7	7	3*	14*	6	2	5	5	Ret	NC	9	1*	**1***	9	5	11	13	4	2*	3	6	Ret	19	303
6	(United Kingdom) Tom Onslow-Cole	3	10	Ret	5	10	9	8	13	10	Ret	9	**3***	7	6	2	6	7	2	2*	2	5	8	14	7	10	6	5	**3***	15*	10	281
7	(United Kingdom) Mat Jackson	7	4	Ret	1*	**3***	DSQ	1*	**3***	6	5	Ret	7	8	NC	12	8	6	4	5	Ret	10	4	4	6	Ret*	1*	2	Ret	7	**Ret***	274
8	(Republic of Ireland) Árón Smith	Ret	Ret	8	8	9	11	7	8	14	Ret	16	Ret	10	Ret	Ret	14	10	6	4	6	8	Ret	6	5*	3	4	9	4	1*	5	204
9	(United Kingdom) Dave Newsham	**Ret***	9	3	7	4	Ret*	2	6	18	Ret	10	Ret	Ret	12	16	DSQ	8	1*	11	10	**1***	12	15	Ret	2	3	Ret	7	Ret	6	202
10	(United Kingdom) Frank Wrathall	Ret	DNS	13	9	14	7	5	4	3	12	17	9	Ret	8	15	**2**	5	7	Ret	DNS	DNS	11	5	12	Ret	12	Ret	Ret	6	1*	173
11	(United Kingdom) Nick Foster	9	Ret	DNS	11	11	12	14	14	11	9	6	8	18	10	**8***	11	13	13	8	5	7	10	10	9	6	10	**4***	15	14	13	164
12	(United Kingdom) Jeff Smith	10	7	4	13	6	**5**	13	11	9	Ret	DNS	12	Ret	13	11	10	11	11	14	9	2	Ret	13	Ret	8	11	10	10	8	17	157
13	(United Kingdom) Rob Austin	8	5	5	Ret	DNS	DNS	Ret	18	13				5	3	7	12	Ret	Ret				9	16	10	5	5	DSQ	17	10	7	122
14	(United Kingdom) Lea Wood	11	15	9	Ret	15	10	9	12	8	10	7	5	13	19	Ret	9	9	**Ret***	Ret	13	13				9	16	15	11	9	9	116
15	(United Kingdom) Daniel Welch	17	11	Ret	12	Ret	8	Ret	DNS	DNS	6	4	Ret	Ret	17	10	5	17	12	12	Ret	12				Ret	8	14	16	Ret	Ret	79
16	(United Kingdom) Andy Neate	12	14	14	16	12	Ret	16	16	Ret	7	Ret	Ret	6	9	9*	15	12	15	Ret	12	15	7	Ret	14	12	18	Ret	13	12	Ret	79
17	(United Kingdom) Tony Gilham	18	13	10	14	7	3	11	9	**Ret***	Ret	11	10	12	11	Ret	13	Ret	Ret							Ret	Ret	Ret	Ret	NC	16	71
18	(United Kingdom) Ollie Jackson	13	8	**Ret**	NC	DNS	DNS	12	15	15	11	15	15	11	15	Ret	Ret	15	14				NC	8	8	14	NC	16	Ret	11	11	61
19	(United Kingdom) Adam Morgan	Ret	DNS	Ret	15	13	Ret	Ret	NC	Ret	Ret	Ret	Ret	15	20	14	Ret	Ret	10	10	Ret	11	NC	9	**11**	16	14	8	12	Ret	DNS	50
20	(United Kingdom) Will Bratt										8	Ret	11	9	18	Ret							Ret	Ret	15	13	Ret	13	9	Ret	12	38
21	(United Kingdom) Liam Griffin	14	12	11	Ret	Ret	14	Ret	17	12	Ret	8	Ret	14	14	Ret										Ret	13	Ret	19	13	14	37
22	(United Kingdom) Paul O'Neill													17	Ret	13				6	4	6										36
23	(United Kingdom) Chris James	15	Ret	12	17	Ret	13	15	Ret	17	Ret	13	13	16	16	17	Ret	Ret	Ret	13	Ret	16	13	18	Ret	Ret	15	12	18	16	18	26
24	(United Kingdom) Howard Fuller																						14	12	16	11	NC	11				16
25	(United Kingdom) Tony Hughes	16	16	15	Ret	16	15	NC	19	16	13	12	14				16	16	16				15	17	17	15	17	17	20	17	15	14
26	(United States) Robb Holland																Ret	14	17	Ret	14	14										6
27	(United Kingdom) Aaron Williamson																												14	Ret	DNS	2
28	(United Kingdom) John Thorne	Ret	17	16	DNS	DNS	DNS																									0
–	(United Kingdom) Chris Stockton																									WD	WD	WD				0
Pos	Driver	BHI			DON			THR			OUL			CRO			SNE			KNO			ROC			SIL			BHGP			Pts
Sources:

- Note: **bold** signifies pole position (1 point given in first race only, and race 2 and 3 poles are based on race results), italics signifies fastest lap (1 point given all races) and * signifies at least one lap in the lead (1 point given all races).

=== Manufacturers'/Constructors' Championship ===
Pos	Manufacturer/Constructor	BHI			DON			THR			OUL			CRO			SNE			KNO			ROC			SIL			BHGP			Pts
1	Honda / Team Dynamics	2	1	7	2	1	1	6	1	1	1	1	1	1	1	4	4	2	8	3	3	3	3	1	1	7	7	6	1	2	2	902
1	Honda / Team Dynamics	5	Ret	DSQ	3	2	Ret	10	5	2	4	5	4	3	2	6	7	4	DSQ	7	8	Ret	6	2	2	Ret	Ret	Ret	5	3	3	902
2	MG / Triple Eight Race Engineering	4	3	1	4	12	2	3	2	4	7	3	2	6	7	1	1	3	3	Ret	11	15	1	3	3	1	18	1	8	5	8	722
2	MG / Triple Eight Race Engineering	12	14	14	16	NC	Ret	16	16	Ret	NC	Ret	Ret	NC	9	9	15	12	15	Ret	12	Ret	7	Ret	14	12	Ret	Ret	13	12	Ret	722
Pos	Manufacturer/Constructor	BHI			DON			THR			OUL			CRO			SNE			KNO			ROC			SIL			BHGP			Pts

=== Teams' Championship ===
Pos	Team	BHI			DON			THR			OUL			CRO			SNE			KNO			ROC			SIL			BHGP			Pts
1	Honda Yuasa Racing Team	2	1	7	2	1	1	6	1	1	1	1	1	1	1	4	4	2	8	3	3	3	3	1	1	7	7	6	1	2	2	738
1	Honda Yuasa Racing Team	5	Ret	DSQ	3	2	Ret	10	5	2	4	5	4	3	2	6	7	4	DSQ	7	8	Ret	6	2	2	Ret	Ret	Ret	5	3	3	738
2	eBay Motors	1	6	6	5	8	4	4	7	7	3	6	3	2	5	2	6	7	2	1	1	5	5	10	7	4	2	3	3	14	10	607
2	eBay Motors	3	10	Ret	10	10	9	8	13	10	9	9	6	7	6	5	11	13	9	2	2	7	8	11	9	6	6	4	6	15	13	607
3	Pirtek Racing	6	2	2	6	5	5	13	10	5	2	2	12	4	4	3	3	1	5	9	7	2	2	7	4	8	9	7	2	4	4	509
3	Pirtek Racing	10	7	4	13	6	6	Ret	11	9	Ret	DNS	Ret	Ret	13	11	10	11	11	14	9	4	Ret	13	Ret	Ret	11	10	10	8	17	509
4	Redstone Racing	7	4	8	1	3	11	1	3	6	5	8	7	8	14	12	8	6	4	4	6	8	4	4	5	3	1	2	4	1	5	502
4	Redstone Racing	14	12	11	8	9	14	7	8	12	Ret	16	Ret	10	NC	Ret	14	10	6	5	Ret	10	Ret	6	6	Ret	4	9	19	7	14	502
5	MG KX Momentum Racing	4	3	1	4	12	2	3	2	4	7	3	2	6	7	1	1	3	3	Ret	11	15	1	3	3	1	18	1	8	5	8	446
5	MG KX Momentum Racing	12	14	14	16	NC	Ret	16	16	Ret	NC	Ret	Ret	NC	9	9	15	12	15	Ret	12	Ret	7	Ret	14	12	Ret	Ret	13	12	Ret	446
6	Team ES Racing.com	15	9	3	7	4	13	2	6	17	Ret	10	13	16	12	16	Ret	8	1	11	10	1	12	15	Ret	2	3	12	7	16	6	242
6	Team ES Racing.com	Ret	Ret	12	17	Ret	Ret	15	Ret	18	Ret	13	Ret	Ret	16	17	DSQ	Ret	Ret	13	Ret	16	13	18	Ret	Ret	15	Ret	18	Ret	18	242
7	Dynojet	Ret	DNS	13	9	14	7	5	4	3	12	17	9	Ret	8	15	2	5	7	Ret	DNS	DNS	11	5	12	Ret	12	Ret	Ret	6	1	166
8	Rob Austin Racing	8	5	5	Ret	DNS	DNS	Ret	18	13	8	Ret	11	5	3	7	12	Ret	Ret				9	16	10	5	5	13	9	10	7	126
8	Rob Austin Racing													9	18	Ret							Ret	Ret	15	13	Ret	DSQ	17	Ret	12	126
9	BINZ Racing	11	15	9	Ret	15	10	9	12	8	10	7	5	13	19	Ret	9	9	Ret	Ret	13	13				9	16	15	11	9	9	122
10	Speedworks Motorsport	16	16	15	15	13	15	NC	19	16	13	12	14	15	20	13	16	16	10	6	4	6	15	9	11	15	14	8	12	17	15	121
10	Speedworks Motorsport	Ret	DNS	Ret	Ret	16	Ret	Ret	NC	Ret	Ret	Ret	Ret	17	Ret	14	Ret	Ret	16	10	Ret	11	NC	17	17	16	17	17	20	Ret	DNS	121
11	Team HARD.	18	13	10	14	7	3	11	9	Ret	Ret	11	10	12	11	Ret	Ret	14	17	Ret	14	14	14	12	16	11	NC	11	14	NC	16	100
11	Team HARD.																												Ret	Ret	DNS	100
12	Welch Motorsport	17	11	Ret	12	Ret	8	DNS	DNS	DNS	6	4	Ret	Ret	17	10	5	17	12	12	Ret	12				Ret	8	14	16	Ret	Ret	85
13	AmD Tuning.com	13	8	Ret	NC	DNS	DNS	12	15	15	11	15	15	11	15	Ret	Ret	15	14				NC	8	8	14	NC	16	Ret	11	11	71
14	Thorney Motorsport	Ret	17	16	DNS	DNS	DNS										13	Ret	Ret							Ret	Ret	Ret				3
Pos	Team	BHI			DON			THR			OUL			CRO			SNE			KNO			ROC			SIL			BHGP			Pts

=== Independents' Trophy ===
Pos	Driver	BHI			DON			THR			OUL			CRO			SNE			KNO			ROC			SIL			BHGP			Pts
1	(United Kingdom) Andrew Jordan	6	2	2	**6**	5	6	**Ret**	10	5	2	**2**	Ret	**4**	4	3	3	1	5	9	7	4	**2**	**7**	4	Ret	9	7	2	**4**	4	425
2	(United Kingdom) Rob Collard	1	**6**	6	10	8	4	4	7	7	**3**	14	6	2	**5**	5	Ret	NC	9	**1**	**1**	9	5	11	13	4	2	3	6	Ret	19	356
3	(United Kingdom) Tom Onslow-Cole	3	10	Ret	5	10	9	8	13	10	Ret	9	**3**	7	6	2	6	7	2	2	2	5	8	14	7	10	6	5	**3**	15	10	343
4	(United Kingdom) Mat Jackson	7	4	Ret	1	**3**	DSQ	1	**3**	6	5	Ret	7	8	NC	12	8	6	4	5	Ret	10	4	4	6	**Ret**	1	2	Ret	7	**Ret**	338
5	(Republic of Ireland) Árón Smith	Ret	Ret	8	8	9	11	7	8	14	Ret	16	Ret	10	Ret	Ret	14	10	6	4	6	8	Ret	6	5	3	4	9	4	1	5	257
6	(United Kingdom) Dave Newsham	**Ret**	9	3	7	4	Ret	2	6	18	Ret	10	Ret	Ret	12	16	DSQ	8	1	11	10	**1**	12	15	Ret	2	**3**	Ret	7	Ret	6	247
7	(United Kingdom) Nick Foster	9	Ret	DNS	11	11	12	14	14	11	9	6	8	18	10	**8**	11	13	13	8	5	7	10	10	9	6	10	**4**	15	14	13	239
8	(United Kingdom) Frank Wrathall	Ret	DNS	13	9	14	7	5	4	3	12	17	9	Ret	8	15	**2**	**5**	7	Ret	DNS	DNS	11	5	12	Ret	12	Ret	Ret	6	1	236
9	(United Kingdom) Jeff Smith	10	7	4	13	6	**5**	13	11	9	Ret	DNS	12	Ret	13	11	10	11	11	14	9	2	Ret	13	Ret	8	11	10	10	8	17	222
10	(United Kingdom) Lea Wood	11	15	9	Ret	15	10	9	12	8	10	7	5	13	19	Ret	9	9	**Ret**	Ret	13	13				9	16	15	11	9	9	178
11	(United Kingdom) Rob Austin	8	5	5	Ret	DNS	DNS	Ret	18	13				5	3	7	12	Ret	Ret				9	16	10	5	5	DSQ	17	10	7	172
12	(United Kingdom) Daniel Welch	17	11	Ret	12	Ret	8	DNS	DNS	DNS	6	4	Ret	Ret	17	10	5	17	12	12	Ret	12				Ret	8	14	16	Ret	Ret	122
13	(United Kingdom) Ollie Jackson	13	8	**Ret**	NC	DNS	DNS	12	15	15	11	15	15	11	15	Ret	Ret	15	14				NC	8	8	14	NC	16	Ret	11	11	115
14	(United Kingdom) Tony Gilham	18	13	10	14	7	3	11	9	**Ret**	Ret	11	10	12	11	Ret	13	Ret	Ret							Ret	Ret	Ret	Ret	NC	16	111
15	(United Kingdom) Adam Morgan	Ret	DNS	Ret	15	13	Ret	Ret	NC	Ret	Ret	Ret	Ret	15	20	14	Ret	Ret	10	10	Ret	11	NC	9	**11**	16	14	8	12	Ret	DNS	83
16	(United Kingdom) Chris James	15	Ret	12	17	Ret	13	15	Ret	17	Ret	13	13	16	16	17	Ret	Ret	Ret	13	Ret	16	13	18	Ret	Ret	15	12	18	16	18	77
17	(United Kingdom) Liam Griffin	14	12	11	Ret	Ret	14	Ret	17	12	Ret	8	Ret	14	14	Ret										Ret	13	Ret	19	13	14	72
18	(United Kingdom) Tony Hughes	16	16	15	Ret	16	15	NC	19	16	13	12	14				16	16	16				15	17	17	15	17	17	20	17	15	72
19	(United Kingdom) Will Bratt										8	Ret	11	9	18	Ret							Ret	Ret	15	13	Ret	13	9	Ret	12	64
20	(United Kingdom) Paul O'Neill													17	Ret	13				6	4	6										46
21	(United Kingdom) Howard Fuller																						14	12	16	11	NC	11				31
22	(United States) Robb Holland																Ret	14	17	Ret	14	14										17
23	(United Kingdom) Aaron Williamson																												14	Ret	DNS	6
24	(United Kingdom) John Thorne	Ret	17	16	DNS	DNS	DNS																									5
–	(United Kingdom) Chris Stockton																									WD	WD	WD				0
Pos	Driver	BHI			DON			THR			OUL			CRO			SNE			KNO			ROC			SIL			BHGP			Pts

=== Independents Teams' Trophy ===
Pos	Team	BHI			DON			THR			OUL			CRO			SNE			KNO			ROC			SIL			BHGP			Pts
1	Pirtek Racing	6	2	2	6	5	5	13	10	5	2	2	12	4	4	3	3	1	5	9	7	2	2	7	4	8	9	7	2	4	4	475
2	Redstone Racing	7	4	8	1	3	11	1	3	6	5	8	7	8	14	12	8	6	4	4	6	8	4	4	5	3	1	2	4	1	5	466
3	eBay Motors	1	6	6	5	8	4	4	7	7	3	6	3	2	5	2	6	7	2	1	1	5	5	10	7	4	2	3	3	14	10	461
4	Team ES Racing.com	15	9	3	7	4	13	2	6	17	Ret	10	13	16	12	16	Ret	8	1	11	10	1	12	15	Ret	2	3	12	7	16	6	326
5	Dynojet	Ret	DNS	13	9	14	7	5	4	3	12	17	9	Ret	8	15	2	5	7	Ret	DNS	DNS	11	5	12	Ret	12	Ret	Ret	6	1	259
6	Speedworks Motorsport	16	16	15	15	13	15	NC	19	16	13	12	14	15	20	13	16	16	10	6	4	6	15	9	11	15	14	8	12	17	15	254
7	BINZ Racing	11	15	9	Ret	15	10	9	12	8	10	7	5	13	19	Ret	9	9	Ret	Ret	13	13				9	16	15	11	9	9	228
8	Team HARD.	18	13	10	14	7	3	11	9	Ret	Ret	11	10	12	11	Ret	Ret	14	17	Ret	14	14	14	12	16	11	NC	11	14	NC	16	220
9	Rob Austin Racing	8	5	5	Ret	DNS	DNS	Ret	18	13	8	Ret	11	5	3	7	12	Ret	Ret				9	16	10	5	5	13	9	10	7	199
10	Welch Motorsport	17	11	Ret	12	Ret	8	DNS	DNS	DNS	6	4	Ret	Ret	17	10	5	17	12	12	Ret	12				Ret	8	14	16	Ret	Ret	163
11	AmD Tuning.com	13	8	Ret	NC	DNS	DNS	12	15	15	11	15	15	11	15	Ret	Ret	15	14				Ret	8	8	14	NC	16	Ret	11	11	162
12	Thorney Motorsport	Ret	17	16	DNS	DNS	DNS										13	Ret	Ret							Ret	Ret	Ret				19
Pos	Team	BHI			DON			THR			OUL			CRO			SNE			KNO			ROC			SIL			BHGP			Pts
