= Polly Stockton =

British event rider (born 1973)

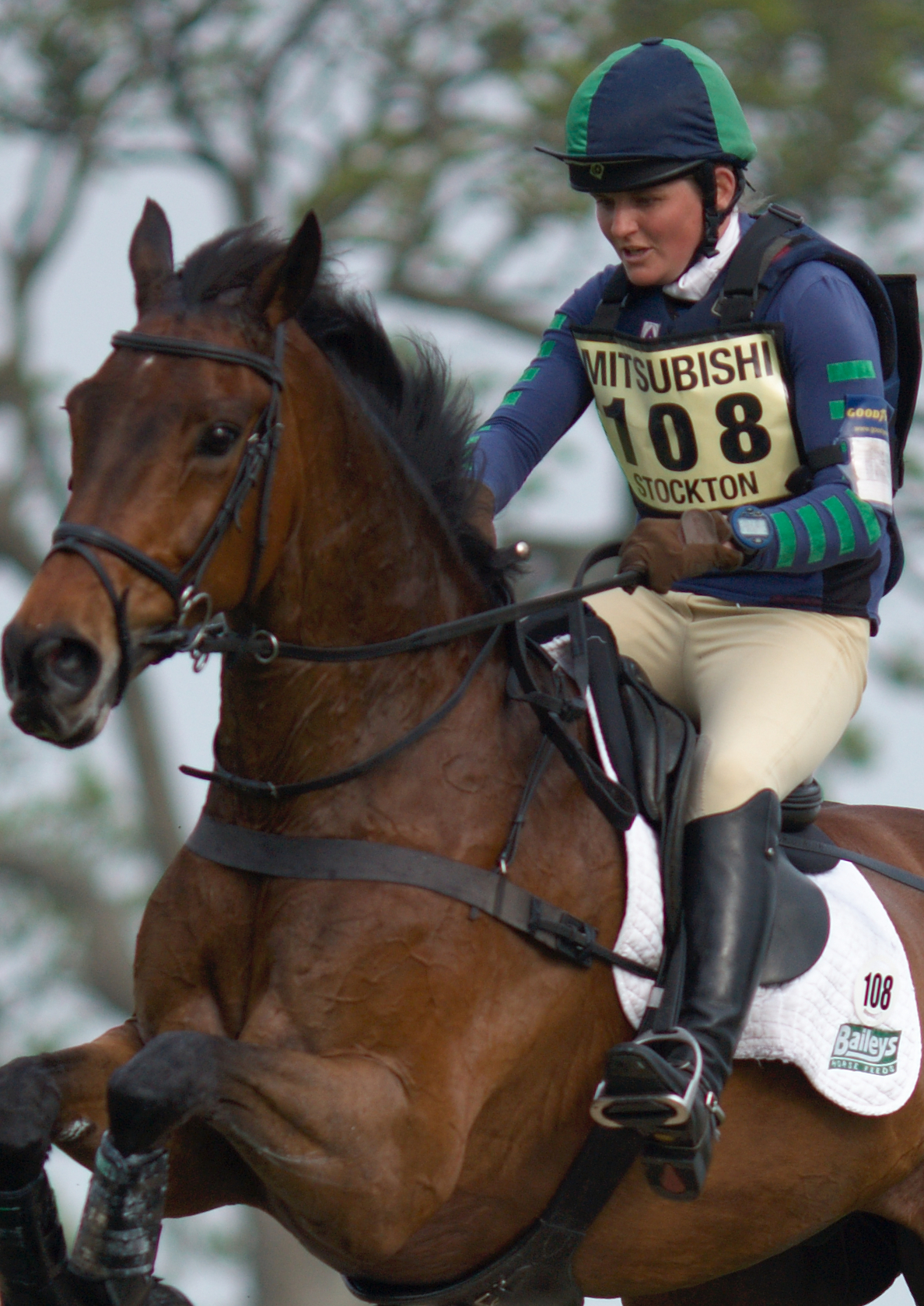
- Polly Stockton and Westwood Poser, during the Badminton Horse Trials 2011

Personal information
- Full name: Polly Stockton
- Nationality: Great Britain
- Discipline: Eventing
- Born: 23 October 1973 (age 51)

Polly Stockton (born 23 October 1973) is a British event rider. Stockton is a member of the British World Class Performance squad. She attended Adcote School in Shropshire.

Stockton has had a successful career as a young rider; she won the team gold at the 1994 European Young Rider Championships and was the British National Champion in 1999. At Senior level she won at Blenheim and Windsor in 1998. She was selected to take part in the British team at the World Equestrian Games in Jerez in 2002.

Stockton also finished second in Burghley in 2002, 2007 and 2009.

Stockton finished fourth in the 2009 British Open Championship.

In September 2009, Stockton finished second at the Burghley Horse Trials. Riding Westwood Poser, she rode clear rounds in both cross-country and show jumping phases, moving up from 16th place after the dressage phase.

She is married to British car racing driver Chris Stockton.

Stockton's future top horses include Benromach, Imperial Trump and Ortolan.
