= 2013 British Touring Car Championship =

56th season of the British Touring Car Championship

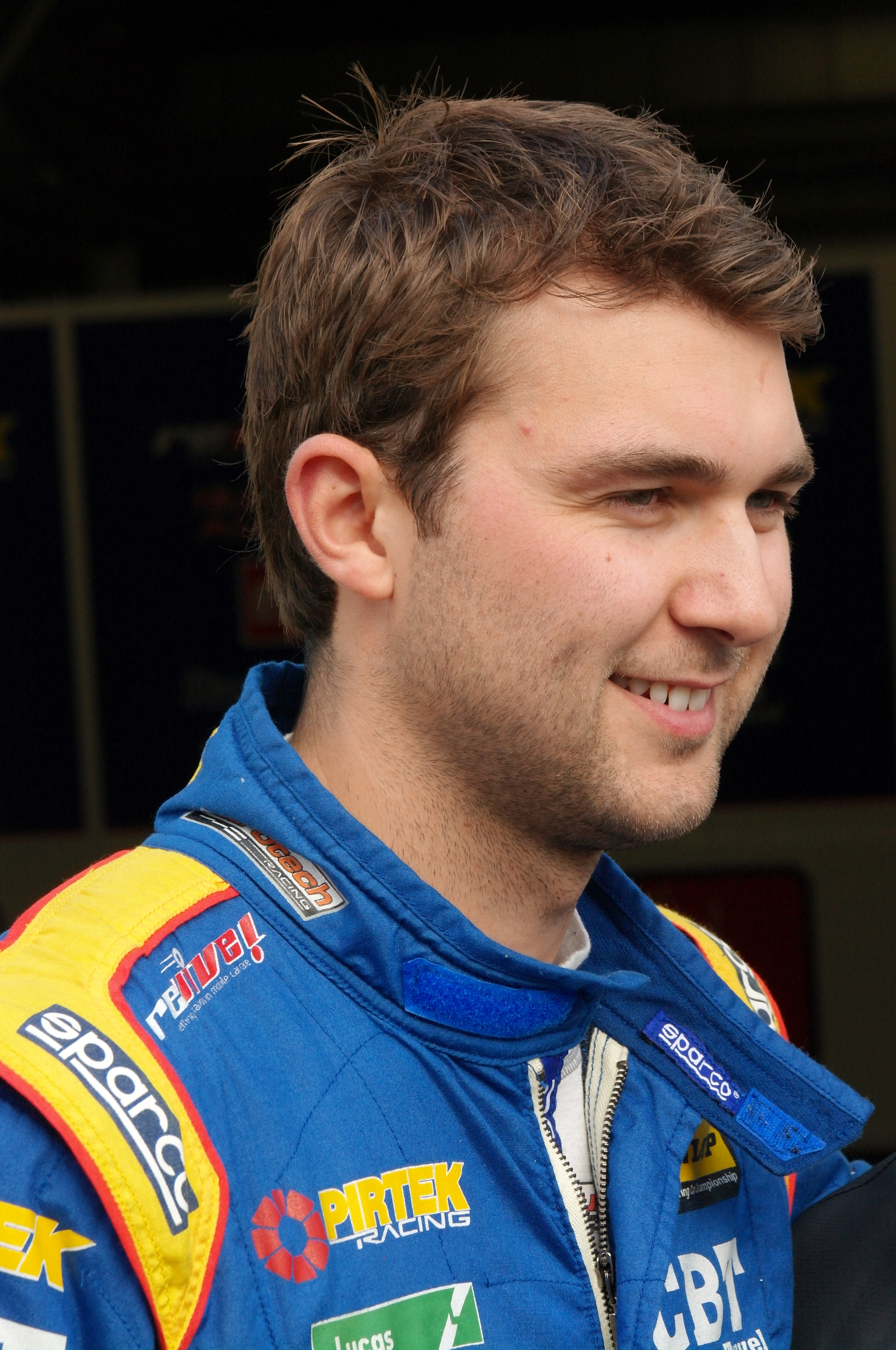
Andrew Jordan, the 2013 Drivers' Champion

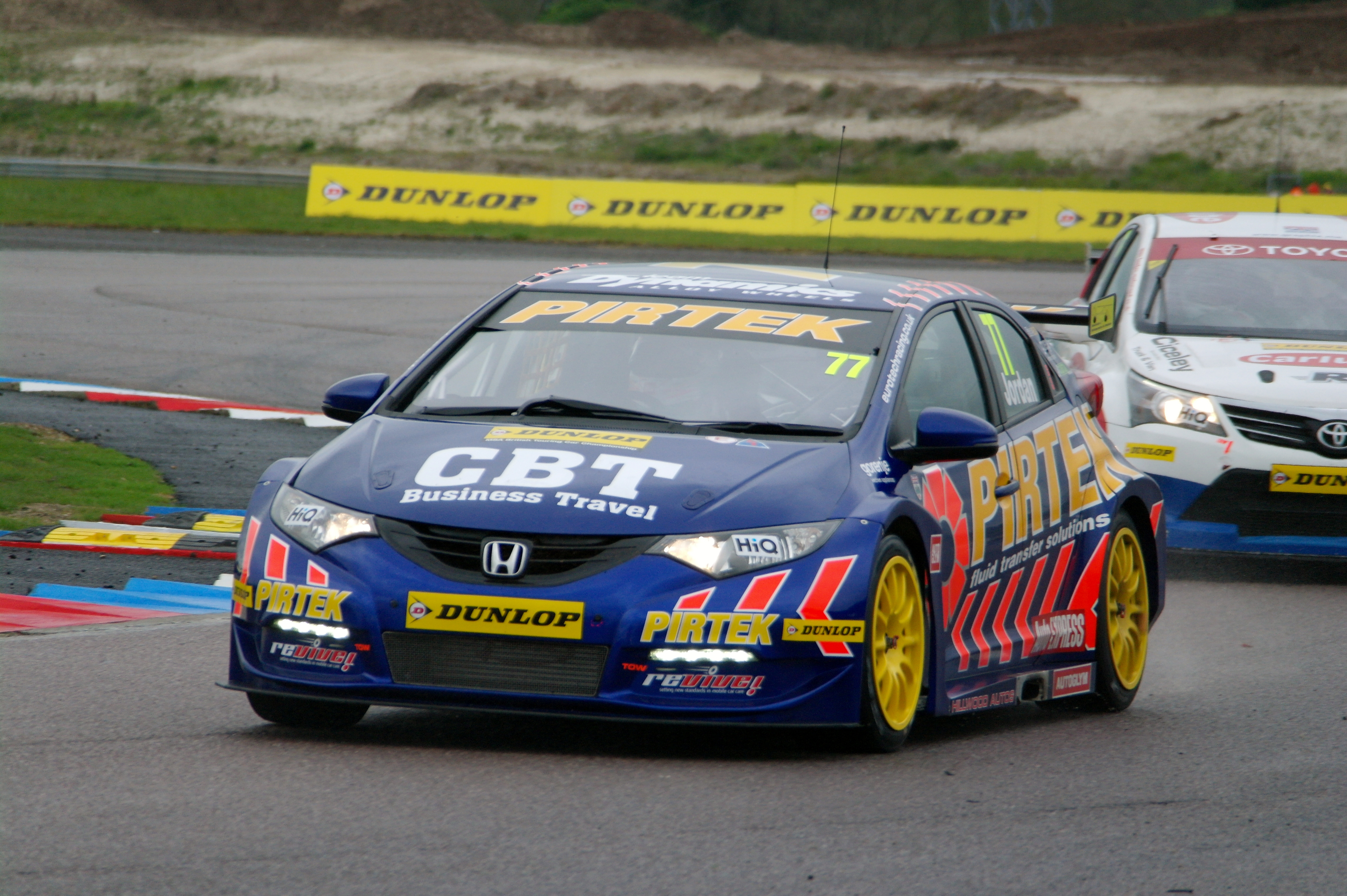
Andrew Jordan's Championship Winning BTCC Honda Civic

The 2013 Dunlop MSA British Touring Car Championship was a multi-event motor racing championship for production-based touring cars held across England and Scotland. The championship features a mix of professional motor racing teams and privately funded amateur drivers competing in highly modified versions of Family cars which are sold to the general public and conform to the technical regulations for the championship. It is one of the most popular domestic motor racing series in the United Kingdom, with an extensive program of support categories built up around the BTCC centrepiece. It was the 56th British Touring Car Championship (BTCC) season.

This was the third season that cars conforming to the Next Generation Touring Car (NGTC) specification will be allowed to compete and the first season since the end of the phased transition from the Super 2000 specification which saw the organising body, TOCA, maintain a performance equalisation between the two chassis specifications. The season saw teams compete with car chassis built to either NGTC or S2000 specification although the NGTC cars had a significant performance advantage over the S2000 cars by giving NGTC cars a significant increase in the turbo boost pressures which they were allowed to run. All teams used the NGTC 2.0 litre turbocharged engine. Teams with S2000 cars were eligible for the newly introduced S2000 trophy named after the winner of the inaugural British Saloon Car Championship in 1958, Jack Sears, known as the Jack Sears Trophy, which Sears himself awarded to the top S2000 finisher of the year – Lea Wood – at the final round at Brands Hatch based on the number of S2000 wins (known as 'cups') over the season.

== Season report ==
Round One (Races 1, 2 & 3) – Brands Hatch Indy

Qualifying for the first race of 2013 started in sunny and cold conditions. The low track temperature caused a few early warm up incidents with several cars sliding off the track culminating in a red flag, after two minutes, for a collision between the spun Colin Turkington and Jack Goff. As the session restarted and drivers began to get heat into the tyres, the times started to Passat cc with Andrew Jordan setting the fastest time which would become the first pole position of the season after deteriorating track conditions due to a snow shower prevented drivers from improving their times.

The opening race of the season saw a race long battle between Jason Plato and Andrew Jordan which culminated in Jordan making a last lap dive up the inside of Plato on the final corner. Both Plato and Jordan went off into the gravel, however both drivers were able to recover with Plato winning from Jordan and the fast starting Rob Austin rounding off the podium. Elsewhere the championship campaign got off to a bad start for the Honda pair, after both Matt Neal and Gordon Shedden had to make unscheduled pit stops, finishing out of the points. Race two was also won by Jason Plato, with Andrew Jordan repeating his race 1 second place and Jordan's Pirtek Racing teammate Jeff Smith rounding off the podium. Shedden had originally finished the race third, however post race scrutineers found that he was running below the minimum ride height. Race three began with a big crash for Rob Austin on lap two after Dave Newsham spun coming down Paddock Hill Bend, tagging the back of Austin's Audi and sending him spinning into the barrier. After a safety car period, Matt Neal took the lead and went on to win the race from his teammate Shedden who had to race through from the back of the grid.

In the Jack Sears Trophy, Liam Griffin took two wins with James Kaye taking the other.

Round Two (Races 4, 5 & 6) – Donington Park

Qualifying was between two drivers, Gordon Shedden and Frank Wrathall with both drivers swapping fastest lap times in the last minutes of the session. Shedden though was able to beat Wrathall's fastest time as the session came to a close to claim his first pole position since Oulton Park in 2011.

The day's first race was a lights to flag victory for Shedden who was pushed all the way however by Andrew Jordan who finished second. Third was Matt Neal, making it a Honda Civic lock-out of the podium. Race two of the day had two very special milestones for two drivers. Jason Plato celebrated his 400th race in the BTCC, whilst Matt Neal celebrated his 500th race. Both Plato and Neal ran the numbers 400 and 500 respectively in this race, which was won by Andrew Jordan, from Plato and Shedden. The reverse grid of race three allowed front row starter Colin Turkington take his first win since Snetterton in 2009 and the maiden win for the new eBay Motors BMW 125i. Shedden and Neal finished second and third respectively whilst Plato struggled with the softer tyre, finishing down in eighth.

In the Jack Sears Trophy, James Kaye took his second cup of the season, whilst Joe Girling and Lea Wood both took their first cup.

Round Three (Races 7, 8 & 9) – Thruxton

Andrew Jordan secured his second pole position of the year at the track where he also claimed pole 12 months ago, whilst Gordon Shedden and Matt Neal made it a Honda lock-out of the first three grid slots.

Race seven of the season took place in hot and sunny conditions. There was an opening lap mishap for Shedden, when he made contact with Jason Plato at the complex, sending him slamming into the barrier. Despite this, Shedden was able to continue and finished the race at the back of the field. Pole sitter Andrew Jordan lead from the start and looked good for the win. However, with half a lap to go, his front left tyre suffered a puncture sending him off into the grass and having to limp home to finish 11th. This promoted Matt Neal to the lead and gave him his second win of the season. Plato finished second with a hard charging Tom Onslow-Cole finishing third in his Volkswagen CC. Race two was also won by Matt Neal after leading from the start. Onslow-Cole improved to second place, achieving PPCGB.com/Kraftwerk Racing's best result to date. Shedden and Jordan both recovered from starting down the field to finish third and fourth respectively with Plato in fifth. The final race of the day had more tyre troubles for the race leader. With two laps to go, Jason Plato's MG6 GT suffered a puncture which would see him drop to the back of the field. This allowed Shedden to take his first win of the day ahead of Matt Neal and Andrew Jordan. This meant that Matt Neal left Thruxton the championship leader, with Andrew Jordan and Jason Plato in second and third ahead of defending champion Gordan Shedden in fourth.

In the Jack Sears Trophy, Lea Wood took two class wins to add to his Donington win with Liam Griffin taking a class win, extending his tally to three cups.

Round Four (Races 10, 11 & 12) – Oulton Park

In the buildup to round four, AmD Tuning.com announced that Aaron Mason would make his BTCC debut, replacing James Kaye who had a business commitment. Qualifying for race ten of the season saw the MG KX Momentum Racing team secure a front row lock-out with team leader Jason Plato starting on pole from rookie teammate Sam Tordoff.

After such a strong qualifying, in came as no surprise that the MG pair we able to convert their front row lock-out into a one-two lights to flag victory for Plato, with Tordoff second in race ten. During the second race of the day, Plato was able to once again win with another lights to flag run, this time ahead of Gordon Shedden and Colin Turkington respectively. However, Tordoff was unable to replicate his first race form. After choosing the soft tyre, he quickly lost grip and stated dropping down the order to finish outside the points, after contact with Mat Jackson. The final race of the day saw action from the very start. The first half of the race saw a fight for the lead between Rob Austin and Jeff Smith, with Austin taking an early lead until lap 8 when Smith passed him after some contact. However, problems for the title contenders began on lap 4 with Plato retiring in the pits with an engine fire and a lap later, Shedden's hopes of a strong finish were dashed after his Honda Yuasa Racing Team Civic suffered a puncture. Smith looked like he could take his first win until on lap 12, he lost it under braking at Knickerbrook, spinning the car round. This allowed his Pirtek Racing teammate, Andrew Jordan, to take his second win of the season, narrowly beating home eBay Motors Colin Turkington.

In the Jack Sears Trophy, Lea Wood took another two class wins with Liam Griffin again taking a class win, extending his tally to four cups, one behind leader Wood on five.

Round Five (Races 13, 14 & 15) – Croft

In the buildup to Croft, Addison Lee Racing announced two driver changes. Jake Hill replaced Liam Griffin for this round, who had business commitments, and he was joined by Michael Caine in a brand new NGTC Ford Focus. Colin Turkington took his first pole position since his last back in 2009 at the same venue and the first pole for the new BMW 125i M Sport. He narrowly beat Jason Plato in a red flag affected session caused by the returning Joe Girling, who crashed at the chicane.

The first race of the day saw Turkington convert his pole into a dominant lights to flag victory ahead of the Honda pairing of Matt Neal and Gordon Shedden respectively. Rain fell during the buildup to the day's second race, leading to a mix of tyre strategies on the grid. At the start, the MG KX Momentum Racing, running on wet tyres, took a large lead from the slick shod cars around them. However, it soon became apparent that the track was not getting wetter, but was starting to dry and as the cars running slicks gained heat and confidence in the tyres, they soon caught and passed Plato and Sam Tordoff who slowly dropped down to finish outside the points. At the front, it was Turkington who once again mastered the tricky conditions to win the race from Shedden in second and Tom Onslow-Cole in an impressive third for PPCGB.com/Kraftwerk Racing. The weather would again affect the final race of the day. However, this time, there was no doubt which tyres you needed to be on, after heavy rain began to fall. Matt Neal won the race after taking the lead from Nick Foster on lap three, however it was not plain sailing. On the final lap, Neal ran wide at two corners, allowing the hat-trick searching Colin Turkington to close right up onto the back bumper of Neal's Honda Civic leaving Neal a winning margin of only 0.6 seconds over Turkington. Andrew Jordan rounded out the podium in third with Shedden a distant fourth. Plato and Tordoff recovered from the poor tyre choice in race two to finish sixth and seventh respectively.

In the Jack Sears Trophy, debutant Jake Hill scored a class win in his maiden outing. David Nye's hard work this year was rewarded by a win in race two and Lea Wood extended his cup lead with victory in the final race of the day.

Round Six (Races 16, 17 & 18) – Snetterton

During the summer break, there were several team changes announced for Snetterton. James Kaye and Warren Scott remained with their respective teams, but changed cars. Kaye swapped his Volkswagen Golf for a Super 2000 Honda Civic. Scott, traded in his S2000 SEAT León for a Next Generation Touring Car Volkswagen CC. Andy Neate finally made his season debut with his home run NGTC Chevrolet Cruze. after several aborted debuts during the season. American Robb Holland also returned, at the circuit he made his BTCC debut in 2012, with RCIB Insurance Racing.

Sam Tordoff took his first pole position in the British Touring Car Championship with Jason Plato second making it a MG KX Momentum Racing front–row lock-out.

Tordoff converted his first pole position into his first race victory in the first race of the day, leading home teammate Plato. Andrew Jordan took a controversial win in race two when he made contact with then race leader Colin Turkington to take the lead. Matt Neal finished second behind his nearest championship rival while Aron Smith claimed the first podium of the season for Airwaves Racing. Plato had led early on before he retired with fuel pump problems. Gordon Shedden won race three in equally controversial circumstances, Turkington had again found himself leading the race when he was tapped into a spin by Shedden. Plato had a dramatic end to his weekend when he spun off on the approach to Hamilton, clipping the barrier and barrel rolling his MG. Jordan and Shedden later had points added to their licences for their moves on Turkington.

In the Jack Sears Trophy, Lea Wood claimed victory in all three races to extend his lead in the trophy standings.

Round Seven (Races 19, 20 & 21) – Knockhill

RCIB Insurance Racing brought in Scottish Legends racer Kieran Gallagher to replace Jack Goff who was missing the Knockhill round for financial reason. Paul O'Neill made his return to the championship in the car raced by Robb Holland at Snetterton. Renault Clio Cup United Kingdom driver Mike Bushell made his championship with Team Club 44, replace team owner Andy Neate. Finesse Motorsport entered the championship with a Super 2000 Chevrolet Cruze LT for series newcomer Aiden Moffat who at 16 years, 10 months and 28 days would become the youngest starter in the British Touring Car Championship, beating the record set by Tom Chilton in 2002.

Rob Austin claimed his first British Touring Car Championship pole position, edging out eBay Motors' Colin Turkington. Andrew Jordan qualified third but took a six–place grid penalty for accumulating three reprimands during the season.

Colin Turkington took victory in race one having passed Austin, who went on to finish third behind local hero Gordon Shedden, on the opening lap. Turkington took victory again in race two with Austin second ahead of Shedden. Jordan won from pole in race three to beat his championship rival Matt Neal who was second. Neal's teammate Shedden retired from the race when he was running fifth when his car caught fire due to an engine failure. Turkington was later excluded from race three when his car was found to have exceeded the maximum boost allowance.

In the Jack Sears Trophy, Liam Griffin took class wins in the first two races, he retired from the third race allowing Lea Wood to add to his tally of cups.

Round Eight (Races 22, 23 & 24) – Rockingham

On the championship's return to England, Jack Goff returned to RCIB Insurance Racing with Howard Fuller returning to the team at the track where he made his championship debut in 2012. Tom Onslow-Cole left Team HARD. to join Airwaves Racing, his seat in the Volkswagen CC was taken by VW Cup racer Andy Wilmot.

Jason Plato led an MG KX Momentum Racing 1–2 in qualifying with Knockhill pole–sitter Rob Austin in third.

Plato had a slow start away from pole and Andrew Jordan made a good start from fourth to jump up into the lead at the first hairpin. Jeff Smith went off the track further around the opening lap while up ahead there was a collision when Will Bratt spun and collected Adam Morgan, there was then a separate collision between Daniel Welch, Tom Onslow-Cole and Andy Neate which saw Howard Fuller go off the track to avoid the stranded cars. When the race resumed after the safety car period on lap 7, Matt Neal spun on the restart to drop towards the back of the field and climbed back up to 14th but lost the championship lead to race winner Jordan. In race two Austin jumped ahead of Jordan and Mat Jackson at the start and led every lap to claim his first race win in the British Touring Car Championship. Jordan was struggling with the extra weight in the car following his race one victory, he dropped down the order and was running behind championship rival Neal until both Rob Collard and Neal went off at the first hairpin. Neal retired from the race and the title advantage returned to Jordan and Shedden who was running second. Jordan was drawn on pole position for the final race of the day, he held the lead at the start of the race as Turkington moved up into 7th place. The first lap saw Jack Goff slide and take out Collard while trying to avoid an also sliding Jeff Smith, bringing out the safety car. After the safety car restart Jordan held on to win the race, Neal climbed from the back of the grid to finish 7th.

In the Jack Sears Trophy, Lea Wood deprived David Nye of victory in race one on the final lap after starting from the pit lane. Wood claimed victory again in race two and race three to secure the Jack Sears Trophy for 2013.

Round Nine (Races 25, 26 & 27) – Silverstone

Aiden Moffat returned to the championship having missed the previous round, he joined PPCGB.com/Kraftwerk Racing to drive their Volkswagen CC for the final two rounds of the season.

As was the case at Rockingham, qualifying saw Jason Plato lead an MG KX Momentum Racing 1–2 on the grid for race one.

The MG drivers converted their front row lock-out into first and second in the race, Plato leading home Sam Tordoff. The race was interrupted by a safety car period early on after a collision at the end of the first lap between Andy Neate, Nick Foster and Will Bratt. Race two saw Plato claim his 80th BTCC victory in another safety car interrupted race, championship leader Andrew Jordan on soft tyres finished a close 2nd after starting 6th. Jordan briefly held the lead before Plato fought back and retook the place, Aron Smith meanwhile closed in on both of them to finish third. Matt Neal was on pole for race three but he was quickly passed by Colin Turkington who started second. Turkington led until the race restarted after a one–lap safety car period to recover debris on the circuit when Gordon Shedden and Aron Smith got past. Turkington's race ended on lap 21 when he spun at Copse and broke the rear suspension on his BMW. Shedden claimed victory to ensure he stayed in contention to retain his title.

In the Jack Sears Trophy, provisional champion Lea Wood claimed victory in all three races; he was the only entrant in race three when Liam Griffin was unable to start.

== Teams and drivers ==
The entry list for the season was released on 21 March 2013.

Team	Car	Engine	No.	Drivers	Rounds
Constructor Entries
Honda Yuasa Racing Team	Honda Civic	Honda/Neil Brown	1	(United Kingdom) Gordon Shedden	All
Honda Yuasa Racing Team	Honda Civic	Honda/Neil Brown	2	(United Kingdom) Matt Neal	All
MG KX Momentum Racing	MG6 GT	TOCA/Swindon	88	(United Kingdom) Sam Tordoff	All
MG KX Momentum Racing	MG6 GT	TOCA/Swindon	99	(United Kingdom) Jason Plato	All
Independent Entries
eBay Motors	BMW 125i M Sport	BMW/Neil Brown	5	(United Kingdom) Rob Collard	All
eBay Motors	BMW 125i M Sport	BMW/Neil Brown	18	(United Kingdom) Nick Foster	All
eBay Motors	BMW 125i M Sport	BMW/Neil Brown	29	(United Kingdom) Colin Turkington	All
Addison Lee Racing	Ford Focus ST Mk.III	Ford/Mountune	4	(United Kingdom) Michael Caine	5
Airwaves Racing	Ford Focus ST Mk.III	Ford/Mountune	7	(United Kingdom) Mat Jackson	All
Airwaves Racing	Ford Focus ST Mk.III	Ford/Mountune	8	(Republic of Ireland) Árón Smith	All
Airwaves Racing	Ford Focus ST Mk.III	Ford/Mountune	6	(United Kingdom) Tom Onslow-Cole	8–10
PPCGB.com/Kraftwerk Racing	Volkswagen CC	TOCA/Swindon	6	(United Kingdom) Tom Onslow-Cole	1–7
PPCGB.com/Kraftwerk Racing	Volkswagen CC	TOCA/Swindon	16	(United Kingdom) Aiden Moffat	9–10
PPCGB.com/Kraftwerk Racing	Volkswagen CC	TOCA/Swindon	21	(United Kingdom) Andy Wilmot	8
RCIB Insurance Racing	Vauxhall Insignia	TOCA/Swindon	20	(United Kingdom) James Cole	1–5
RCIB Insurance Racing	Vauxhall Insignia	TOCA/Swindon	22	(United Kingdom) Howard Fuller	8–9
RCIB Insurance Racing	Vauxhall Insignia	TOCA/Swindon	23	(United Kingdom) Kieran Gallagher	7
RCIB Insurance Racing	Vauxhall Insignia	TOCA/Swindon	31	(United Kingdom) Jack Goff	1–6, 8–10
RCIB Insurance Racing	Vauxhall Insignia	TOCA/Swindon	35	(United States) Robb Holland	6
RCIB Insurance Racing	Vauxhall Insignia	TOCA/Swindon	47	(United Kingdom) Tom Barley	10
RCIB Insurance Racing	Vauxhall Insignia	TOCA/Swindon	58	(United Kingdom) Paul O'Neill	7
Exocet Racing	Audi A4	TOCA/Swindon	9	(United Kingdom) Jake Hill	10
WIX Racing	Audi A4	TOCA/Swindon	13	(United Kingdom) Rob Austin	4–10
WIX Racing	Audi A4	Audi/Field Motorsport	13	(United Kingdom) Rob Austin	1–3
Rob Austin Racing	Audi A4	Audi/Field Motorsport	14	(United Kingdom) Will Bratt	1–4
Rob Austin Racing	Audi A4	TOCA/Swindon	14	(United Kingdom) Will Bratt	5–9
Welch Motorsport with Sopp + Sopp	Proton Persona	TOCA/Swindon	10	(United Kingdom) Daniel Welch	All
Dynojet	Toyota Avensis	Toyota/XCtechR	11	(United Kingdom) Frank Wrathall	All
Speedworks Motorsport	Toyota Avensis	TOCA/Swindon	17	(United Kingdom) Dave Newsham	All
Speedworks Motorsport	Toyota Avensis	TOCA/Swindon	48	(United Kingdom) Ollie Jackson	All
Ciceley Racing	Toyota Avensis	TOCA/Swindon	33	(United Kingdom) Adam Morgan	All
Team BMR Restart	Volkswagen CC	TOCA/Swindon	39	(United Kingdom) Warren Scott	6–10
Team Club 44	Chevrolet Cruze	Chevrolet/RML	44	(United Kingdom) Andy Neate	6, 8–9
Team Club 44	Chevrolet Cruze	Chevrolet/RML	45	(United Kingdom) Mike Bushell	7
Pirtek Racing	Honda Civic	Honda/Neil Brown	55	(United Kingdom) Jeff Smith	1–6, 8–9
Pirtek Racing	Honda Civic	Honda/Neil Brown	77	(United Kingdom) Andrew Jordan	All
Jack Sears Trophy Entries
Addison Lee Racing	Ford Focus ST Mk.II	Ford/Mountune	9	(United Kingdom) Jake Hill	5
Addison Lee Racing	Ford Focus ST Mk.II	Ford/Mountune	66	(United Kingdom) Liam Griffin	1–4, 6–10
Welch Motorsport with Sopp + Sopp	Ford Focus ST Mk.II	Ford/Mountune	12	(United Kingdom) David Nye	1–8
AmD Tuning.com	Honda Civic	Honda/Neil Brown	15	(United Kingdom) James Kaye	6
AmD Tuning.com	Volkswagen Golf	Volkswagen/Lehmann	15	(United Kingdom) James Kaye	1–3, 5
AmD Tuning.com	Volkswagen Golf	Volkswagen/Lehmann	40	(United Kingdom) Shaun Hollamby	10
AmD Tuning.com	Volkswagen Golf	Volkswagen/Lehmann	51	(United Kingdom) Aaron Mason	4
Finesse Motorsport	Chevrolet Cruze LT	Chevrolet/Neil Brown	16	(United Kingdom) Aiden Moffat	7
M247 Racing	Chevrolet Cruze LT	Chevrolet/Neil Brown	90	(United Kingdom) Joe Girling	1–3, 5
Team BMR Restart	SEAT León	SEAT/Ric Wood	39	(United Kingdom) Warren Scott	1–5
Wheel Heaven/Houseman Racing	Vauxhall Vectra	TOCA/Swindon	43	(United Kingdom) Lea Wood	All

=== Driver changes ===
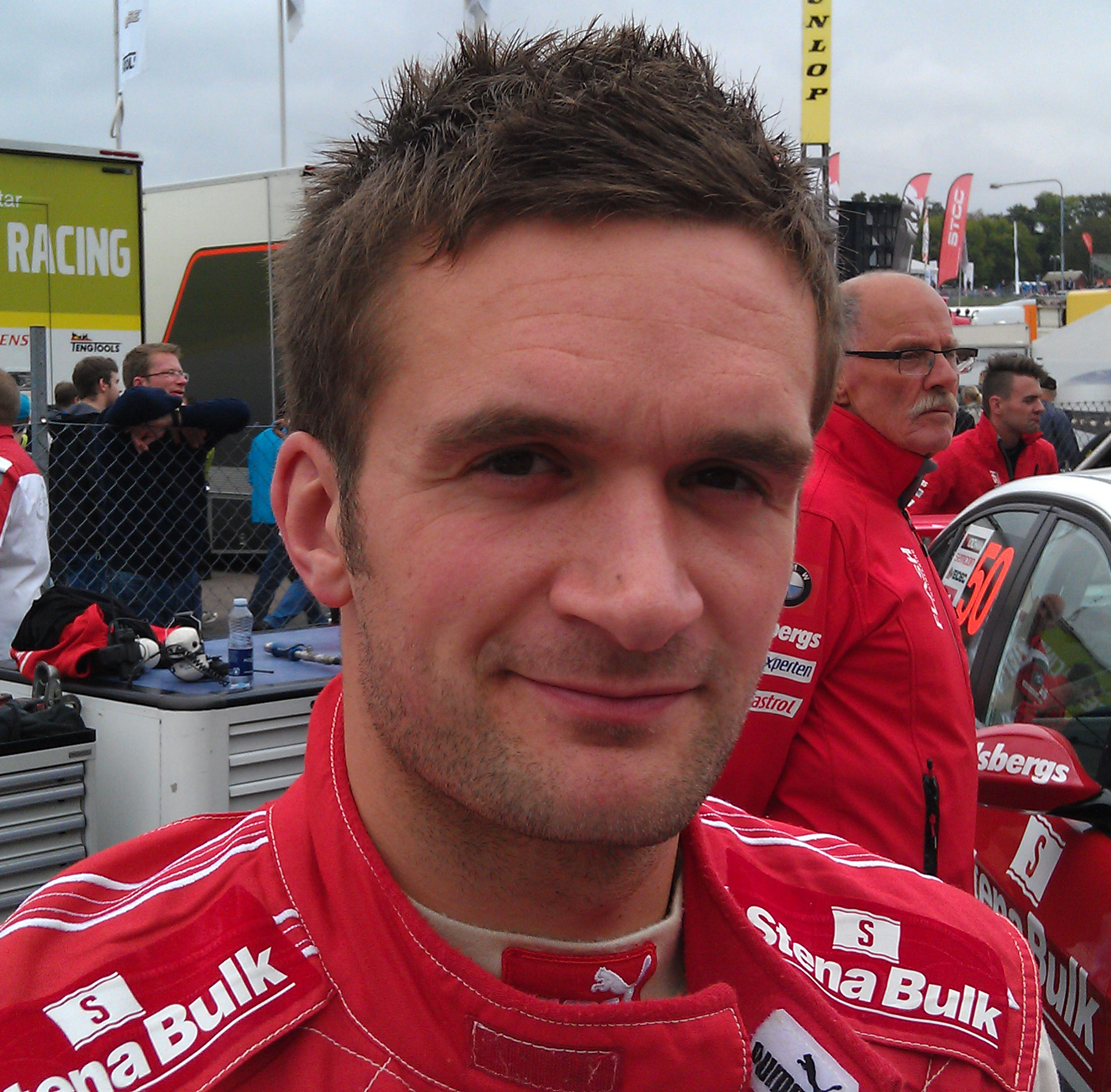
Colin Turkington, seen here in 2011, returned to the BTCC for the first time since winning the 2009 Drivers' Championship.

Changed teams

- Having spent the 2012 season driving for Speedworks Motorsport, Adam Morgan's family run Ciceley Racing team stepped up from Ginetta racing to run a single car team for him in a 2011 specification NGTC Toyota Avensis purchased from the Dynojet team.
- Tom Onslow-Cole switched from eBay Motors to drive the Team HARD.'s Volkswagen CC but switched to a third Airwaves Racing Ford Focus from Rockingham onwards.
- Dave Newsham joined Speedworks Motorsport to drive the Toyota Avensis, moving from Team ES Racing.com.
- Andy Neate left MG KX Momentum Racing despite previously stating he would stay there in 2013, but he announced his intentions to continue in BTCC in 2013 under his own newly created IP Tech Race Engineering team.

Entering/re-entering BTCC

- Chris Stockton intended to return to the BTCC full-time in 2013 with BTC Racing driving their NGTC Chevrolet Cruze, but failed to appear. He and the team competed in the 2014 season.
- Joe Girling entered the BTCC driving for Tech-Speed Motorsport in their S2000 Chevrolet Cruze.
- 2012 Renault Clio Cup UK champion Jack Goff and 2009 British Formula Ford champion James Cole graduated to the BTCC, after signing for Team HARD. to drive their two NGTC Vauxhall Insignias.
- 2009 BTCC champion Colin Turkington returned to eBay Motors to drive one of their three new BMW 125is after competing in the Scandinavian Touring Car Championship in 2011 and making sporadic appearances in the World Touring Car Championship.
- James Kaye returned to the BTCC for the first time since 2010 driving the S2000 Volkswagen Golf of the AmDTuning.com team to compete for the Jack Sears Trophy.
- After contesting two rounds in 2011, Michael Caine returned to race for Motorbase Performance in their Addison Lee Racing team in a NGTC spec Ford Focus at Croft.
- Former Ginetta Junior and GT Supercup racer and BRDC 'Rising Star' Jake Hill replaced Liam Griffin at Croft due to 'unavoidable business commitments'. Hill later appeared in the second Rob Austin Racing Audi A4 at the final Brands Hatch round, replacing Will Bratt.

Leaving BTCC

- Tony Hughes left the BTCC at the end of the 2012 season after his second year with Speedworks Motorsport.

=== Team changes ===
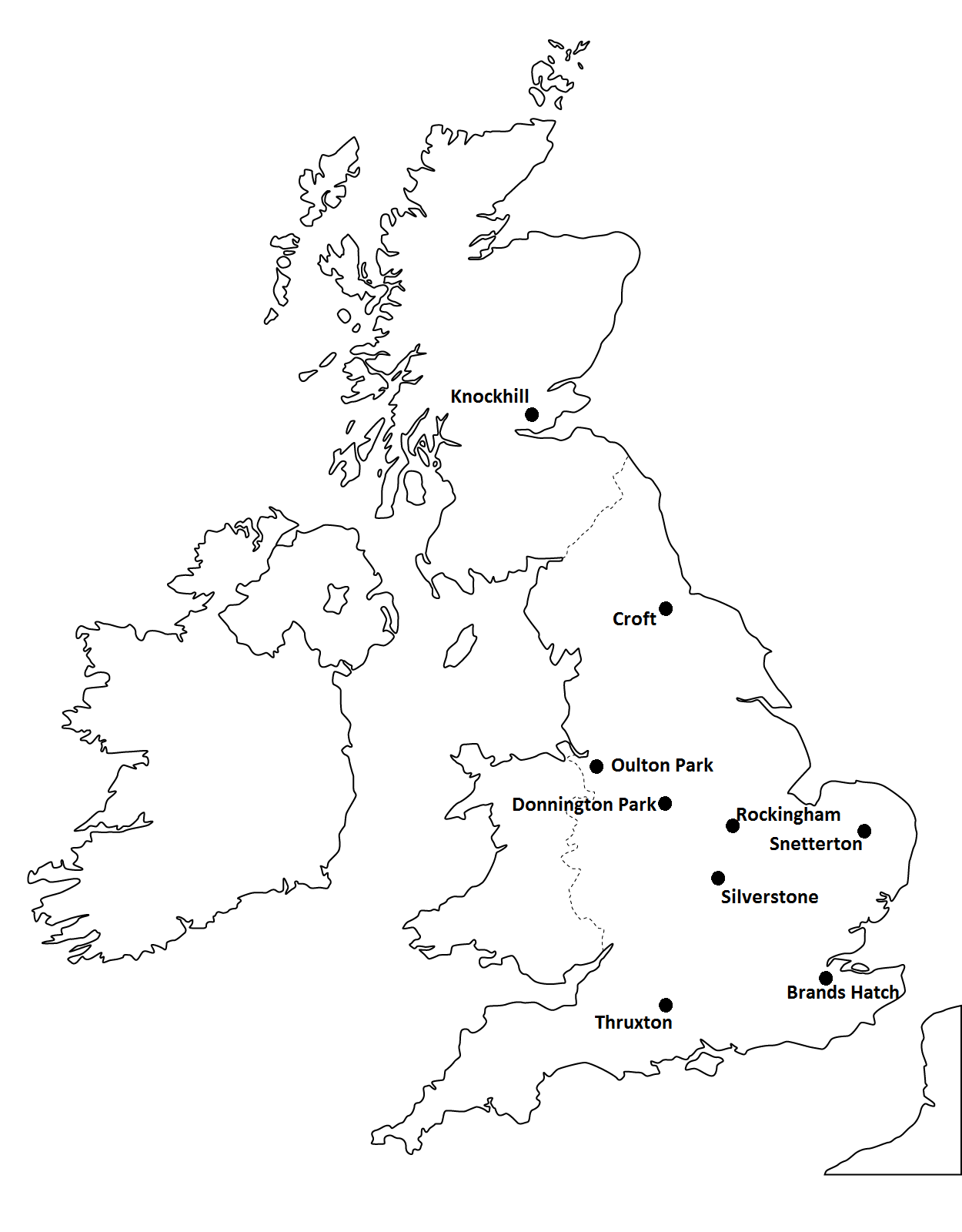
Circuits for the 2013 season

- BTC Racing were supposed to return to the BTCC for the first time since 2008 with a single NGTC Chevrolet Cruze, originally constructed for use in the 2012 season with RML before Chevrolet pulled their manufacturer support but acquired by BTC Racing in October 2012. The team ultimately did not make an appearance during the 2013 season.
- Team HARD. expanded to a four-car team in 2013 having acquired two NGTC Vauxhall Insignia VXR-R cars from Thorney Motorsport and entering two NGTC spec Volkswagen CCs, with the ambition to run two more by the end of the season, but these did not appear. with the Volkswagens competing under the PPCGB.com/Kraftwerk Racing label, while the Vauxhalls competed under the RCIB Insurance Racing banner. The team sold their S2000 Honda Civic after deciding that it would be too difficult for the team to run a car in the Jack Sears Trophy alongside their NGTC cars.
- In January 2013, AmDTuning.com announced that they were building a NGTC-spec Vauxhall Astra that will debut mid-season, running alongside the Volkswagen Golf that the team have been running since 2010. Also in addition to these cars the team intended to run a Super 2000 Ford Focus, but AMD had only been able to secure one entry for their S2000 Volkswagen Golf Mk5 for James Kaye. Later in the season the team bought a Team Dynamics-prepared S2000 Honda Civic for Kaye, which was used at Snetterton.
- Motorbase Performance announced they were selling their three Super 2000 cars to build two more NGTC Fords for a two car team in 2013, following the successful introduction of a NGTC Ford Focus ST at Snetterton for Mat Jackson in 2012. On 6 March the team announced that they were going to receive title sponsorship from Airwaves, and on 8 March Motorbase Performance further announced that they would run a secondary team without title sponsorship from Airwaves for a Super 2000 Ford Focus for Liam Griffin and another NGTC Focus.
- Tech-Speed Motorsport returned to the BTCC, having missed the 2012 season, running a single S2000 Chevrolet Cruze chassis powered by an NGTC engine. The team had hoped to run at Silverstone and Brands Hatch toward the end of 2012, but did not feature. The car was driven by former Dunlop Production Touring Car Championship driver Joe Girling. The team will run under the M247 Racing banner, after receiving title sponsorship from the internet provider M247. The team withdrew from the series after Croft and the car was raced by Aiden Moffat for the team's initial partner, Finesse Motorsport.
- West Surrey Racing switched to 3 NGTC specification BMW 125i cars to replace their S2000 BMW 320sis that they ran since 2007.
- Team BMR Restart ran a SEAT León for Warren Scott in the Jack Sears Trophy, in the opening portion of the season. Scott raced a Team HARD.-prepared NGTC Volkswagen CC from Snetterton onwards.
- Welch Motorsport expanded to a two car team, which ran the NGTC Proton Persona for Daniel Welch and a Super 2000 Ford Focus for David Nye in the Jack Sears Trophy.
- Andy Neate campaigned in an NGTC Chevrolet Cruze under the Team Club 44 banner from Snetterton onwards after losing his seat at MG.

== Race calendar ==
The provisional calendar was announced by the championship organisers on 29 August 2012, with no major changes from 2012. All races were held in the United Kingdom.

Round		Circuit	Date
1	R1	Brands Hatch (Indy Circuit, Kent)	31 March
1	R2	Brands Hatch (Indy Circuit, Kent)	31 March
1	R3	Brands Hatch (Indy Circuit, Kent)	31 March
2	R4	Donington Park (National Circuit, Leicestershire)	21 April
2	R5	Donington Park (National Circuit, Leicestershire)	21 April
2	R6	Donington Park (National Circuit, Leicestershire)	21 April
3	R7	Thruxton (Hampshire)	5 May
3	R8	Thruxton (Hampshire)	5 May
3	R9	Thruxton (Hampshire)	5 May
4	R10	Oulton Park (Island Circuit, Cheshire)	9 June
4	R11	Oulton Park (Island Circuit, Cheshire)	9 June
4	R12	Oulton Park (Island Circuit, Cheshire)	9 June
5	R13	Croft (North Yorkshire)	23 June
5	R14	Croft (North Yorkshire)	23 June
5	R15	Croft (North Yorkshire)	23 June
6	R16	Snetterton (300 Circuit, Norfolk)	4 August
6	R17	Snetterton (300 Circuit, Norfolk)	4 August
6	R18	Snetterton (300 Circuit, Norfolk)	4 August
7	R19	Knockhill (Fife)	25 August
7	R20	Knockhill (Fife)	25 August
7	R21	Knockhill (Fife)	25 August
8	R22	Rockingham (International Super Sports Car Circuit), Northamptonshire)	15 September
8	R23	Rockingham (International Super Sports Car Circuit), Northamptonshire)	15 September
8	R24	Rockingham (International Super Sports Car Circuit), Northamptonshire)	15 September
9	R25	Silverstone (National Circuit, Northamptonshire)	29 September
9	R26	Silverstone (National Circuit, Northamptonshire)	29 September
9	R27	Silverstone (National Circuit, Northamptonshire)	29 September
10	R28	Brands Hatch (Grand Prix Circuit, Kent)	13 October
10	R29	Brands Hatch (Grand Prix Circuit, Kent)	13 October
10	R30	Brands Hatch (Grand Prix Circuit, Kent)	13 October

== Results ==
Round		Circuit	Pole position	Fastest lap	Winning driver	Winning team	Winning independent	Winning S2000
1	R1	Brands Hatch	(United Kingdom) Andrew Jordan	(United Kingdom) Rob Austin	(United Kingdom) Jason Plato	MG KX Momentum Racing	(United Kingdom) Andrew Jordan	(United Kingdom) James Kaye
1	R2	Brands Hatch		(United Kingdom) Jason Plato	(United Kingdom) Jason Plato	MG KX Momentum Racing	(United Kingdom) Andrew Jordan	(United Kingdom) Liam Griffin
1	R3	Brands Hatch		(United Kingdom) Sam Tordoff	(United Kingdom) Matt Neal	Honda Yuasa Racing Team	(United Kingdom) Adam Morgan	(United Kingdom) Liam Griffin
2	R4	Donington Park	(United Kingdom) Gordon Shedden	(United Kingdom) Adam Morgan	(United Kingdom) Gordon Shedden	Honda Yuasa Racing Team	(United Kingdom) Andrew Jordan	(United Kingdom) James Kaye
2	R5	Donington Park		(United Kingdom) Jeff Smith (United Kingdom) Matt Neal	(United Kingdom) Andrew Jordan	Pirtek Racing	(United Kingdom) Andrew Jordan	(United Kingdom) Lea Wood
2	R6	Donington Park		(United Kingdom) Andrew Jordan	(United Kingdom) Colin Turkington	eBay Motors	(United Kingdom) Colin Turkington	(United Kingdom) Joe Girling
3	R7	Thruxton	(United Kingdom) Andrew Jordan	(United Kingdom) Andrew Jordan	(United Kingdom) Matt Neal	Honda Yuasa Racing Team	(United Kingdom) Tom Onslow-Cole	(United Kingdom) Liam Griffin
3	R8	Thruxton		(United Kingdom) Andrew Jordan	(United Kingdom) Matt Neal	Honda Yuasa Racing Team	(United Kingdom) Tom Onslow-Cole	(United Kingdom) Lea Wood
3	R9	Thruxton		(United Kingdom) Gordon Shedden	(United Kingdom) Gordon Shedden	Honda Yuasa Racing Team	(United Kingdom) Andrew Jordan	(United Kingdom) Lea Wood
4	R10	Oulton Park	(United Kingdom) Jason Plato	(United Kingdom) Jason Plato	(United Kingdom) Jason Plato	MG KX Momentum Racing	(United Kingdom) Andrew Jordan	(United Kingdom) Lea Wood
4	R11	Oulton Park		(United Kingdom) Jason Plato	(United Kingdom) Jason Plato	MG KX Momentum Racing	(United Kingdom) Colin Turkington	(United Kingdom) Lea Wood
4	R12	Oulton Park		(United Kingdom) Gordon Shedden	(United Kingdom) Andrew Jordan	Pirtek Racing	(United Kingdom) Andrew Jordan	(United Kingdom) Liam Griffin
5	R13	Croft	(United Kingdom) Colin Turkington	(United Kingdom) Colin Turkington	(United Kingdom) Colin Turkington	eBay Motors	(United Kingdom) Colin Turkington	(United Kingdom) Jake Hill
5	R14	Croft		(United Kingdom) Gordon Shedden	(United Kingdom) Colin Turkington	eBay Motors	(United Kingdom) Colin Turkington	(United Kingdom) David Nye
5	R15	Croft		(United Kingdom) Sam Tordoff	(United Kingdom) Matt Neal	Honda Yuasa Racing Team	(United Kingdom) Colin Turkington	(United Kingdom) Lea Wood
6	R16	Snetterton	(United Kingdom) Sam Tordoff	(United Kingdom) Sam Tordoff	(United Kingdom) Sam Tordoff	MG KX Momentum Racing	(United Kingdom) Colin Turkington	(United Kingdom) Lea Wood
6	R17	Snetterton		(United Kingdom) Andrew Jordan	(United Kingdom) Andrew Jordan	Pirtek Racing	(United Kingdom) Andrew Jordan	(United Kingdom) Lea Wood
6	R18	Snetterton		(United Kingdom) Gordon Shedden	(United Kingdom) Gordon Shedden	Honda Yuasa Racing Team	(United Kingdom) Mat Jackson	(United Kingdom) Lea Wood
7	R19	Knockhill	(United Kingdom) Rob Austin	(United Kingdom) Colin Turkington	(United Kingdom) Colin Turkington	eBay Motors	(United Kingdom) Colin Turkington	(United Kingdom) Liam Griffin
7	R20	Knockhill		(United Kingdom) Colin Turkington	(United Kingdom) Colin Turkington	eBay Motors	(United Kingdom) Colin Turkington	(United Kingdom) Liam Griffin
7	R21	Knockhill		(United Kingdom) Andrew Jordan	(United Kingdom) Andrew Jordan	Pirtek Racing	(United Kingdom) Andrew Jordan	(United Kingdom) Lea Wood
8	R22	Rockingham	(United Kingdom) Jason Plato	(United Kingdom) Rob Austin	(United Kingdom) Andrew Jordan	Pirtek Racing	(United Kingdom) Andrew Jordan	(United Kingdom) Lea Wood
8	R23	Rockingham		(United Kingdom) Gordon Shedden	(United Kingdom) Rob Austin	WIX Racing	(United Kingdom) Rob Austin	(United Kingdom) Lea Wood
8	R24	Rockingham		(United Kingdom) Andrew Jordan	(United Kingdom) Andrew Jordan	Pirtek Racing	(United Kingdom) Andrew Jordan	(United Kingdom) Lea Wood
9	R25	Silverstone	(United Kingdom) Jason Plato	(United Kingdom) Jason Plato	(United Kingdom) Jason Plato	MG KX Momentum Racing	(United Kingdom) Colin Turkington	(United Kingdom) Lea Wood
9	R26	Silverstone		(United Kingdom) Andrew Jordan	(United Kingdom) Jason Plato	MG KX Momentum Racing	(United Kingdom) Andrew Jordan	(United Kingdom) Lea Wood
9	R27	Silverstone		(United Kingdom) Adam Morgan	(United Kingdom) Gordon Shedden	Honda Yuasa Racing Team	(Republic of Ireland) Árón Smith	(United Kingdom) Lea Wood
10	R28	Brands Hatch	(United Kingdom) Jason Plato	(United Kingdom) Jason Plato	(United Kingdom) Jason Plato	MG KX Momentum Racing	(United Kingdom) Tom Onslow-Cole	(United Kingdom) Shaun Hollamby
10	R29	Brands Hatch		(United Kingdom) Jason Plato	(United Kingdom) Jason Plato	MG KX Momentum Racing	(United Kingdom) Mat Jackson	(United Kingdom) Lea Wood
10	R30	Brands Hatch		(United Kingdom) Andrew Jordan	(United Kingdom) Gordon Shedden	Honda Yuasa Racing Team	(United Kingdom) Jack Goff	(United Kingdom) Lea Wood

== Regulation changes ==
- Unlike 2012, S2000 and NGTC cars will no longer have performance parity.
- The amount of change (i.e. increase/decrease) in the turbo boost pressure adjustment will be reduced from the current level.
- Adjustments will be applied to either individual drivers or teams – yet to be determined – but not per car type/chassis as in 2012.
- The frequency in which the adjustments are calculated is also to be finalised – currently it is a "rolling two-event" average.
- In all events except Thruxton, drivers will be required to use a new softer compound of Dunlop tyre in one of the three races of the day which will offer "superior performance to the standard compound tyre." However, they must nominate which race they will use them in prior to qualifying. They will have distinctive markings so that rivals, spectators and TV audiences can see who's using them, similar to the marking used by Pirelli in Formula One.
- Cars must now have a matching set of tyres. They are no longer permitted to have a mix of wet and slick tyres.
- In addition to the fines and licence points system in 2012, from 2013 if a driver receives three warnings; verbal or otherwise, they will be relegated six places on the grid on the third penalty.

== Championship standings ==
The 2012 season introduced a revised championship points system in which the top 15 cars will score championship points, this will continue in the 2013 season.

Points system
**1st**	**2nd**	**3rd**	**4th**	**5th**	**6th**	**7th**	**8th**	**9th**	**10th**	**11th**	**12th**	**13th**	**14th**	**15th**	Fastest lap	Lead a lap
20	17	15	13	11	10	9	8	7	6	5	4	3	2	1	1	1

- No driver may collect more than one "Lead a Lap" point per race no matter how many laps they lead.
- Race 1 polesitter receives 1 point.

=== Drivers' Championship ===
(key)

Pos	Driver	BHI			DON			THR			OUL			CRO			SNE			KNO			ROC			SIL			BHGP			Pts
1	(United Kingdom) Andrew Jordan	**2**	2	6	2	1*	13	**11***	4	3	4	5	1*	6	5	3	5	1*	7	8	6	**1***	1*	**8**	**1***	6	2*	5	5	Ret	9	397
2	(United Kingdom) Gordon Shedden	19	DSQ	2	**1***	**3***	2	25	3	1*	3	2	17	3	2	4	3	7	1*	2	3	Ret	4	2	5	11	7	1*	2	7	**1***	390
3	(United Kingdom) Jason Plato	1*	**1***	5	4	2	8	2	5	22*	**1***	**1***	Ret	5	20*	6	2	Ret*	Ret	4	7	5	**5**	6	3	**1***	**1***	7	**1***	**1***	10	380
4	(United Kingdom) Matt Neal	21	4	1*	3	4	3	1*	**1***	2	6	4	4	2	4	1*	9	2	8	7	5	2	14	Ret	7	3	6	**3**	6	Ret	14	356
5	(United Kingdom) Colin Turkington	8	8	9	8	9	1*	6	11	10	5	3	2	**1***	**1***	2	4	6*	6*	1*	**1***	DSQ	6	3	2	4	5	Ret*	Ret	12	4	347
6	(United Kingdom) Sam Tordoff	4	5	3	6	6	4	4	7	8	2	21	7	7	21	7	**1***	**18**	5	9	8	Ret	16	5	6	2	4	14	3	2	12	286
7	(United Kingdom) Adam Morgan	7	6	4	5	5	5	10	8	12*	9	7	3	11	8	**Ret**	7	5	4	5	Ret	9	Ret	11	11	7	Ret	8	8	8	7	233
8	(United Kingdom) Mat Jackson	20	7	**10***	12	13	9	7	15	7	7	20	19	Ret	Ret	13	8	4	2	12	9	7	2	4	4	9	10	4	9	3	3	225
9	(Republic of Ireland) Árón Smith	9	Ret	11	11	8	7	9	10	5	Ret	14	10	14	12	9	6	3	3	10	Ret	15	13	15	13	8	3	2	10	5	5	201
10	(United Kingdom) Dave Newsham	Ret	9	Ret	9	7	Ret	8	12	9	8	6	14	Ret	9	5	18	8	**Ret**	11	10	Ret	8	7	8	10	8	6	11	4	6	176
11	(United Kingdom) Rob Austin	3*	Ret	Ret	14	Ret	DNS	19	18	Ret	13	8	5*	13	14	11	15	14	12	**3***	2	4	3	1*	9	12	Ret	17	Ret	Ret	18	154
12	(United Kingdom) Tom Onslow-Cole	14	Ret	16	13	10	**6**	3	2	4	15	11	Ret	10	3	12	12	9	17	13	13	Ret	Ret	9	12	15	Ret	13	4	9	13	152
13	(United Kingdom) Rob Collard	Ret	Ret	Ret	15	12	12	13	13	15	10	NC	11	9	6	14	10	Ret	9	6	4	3	7	Ret	Ret	5	Ret	12	7	14	8	140
14	(United Kingdom) Jeff Smith	5	3	7	10	11	10	5	6	6*	11	10	**18***	12	10	10	13	Ret	19				12	10	10	18	DNS	DNS				132
15	(United Kingdom) Nick Foster	NC	10	13	17	16	15	24	16	13	12	15	8	4	7	8*	14	12	10	16	14	8	11	12	14	Ret	13	11	Ret	18	16	98
16	(United Kingdom) Frank Wrathall	6	Ret	8	7	Ret	Ret	15	19	Ret	23	12	9	20	13	Ret	Ret	10	11	14	12	Ret	10	13	Ret	14	Ret	DNS	Ret	10	21	76
17	(United Kingdom) Jack Goff	13	Ret	NC	18	14	16	12	9	**Ret**	16	Ret	12	16	NC	Ret	11	Ret	Ret				9	14	Ret	Ret	15	9	12	6	2	73
18	(United Kingdom) Daniel Welch	11	14	12	NC	15	11	14	Ret	11	14	9	Ret	17	11	Ret	17	Ret	20	Ret	11	6	Ret	DNS	DNS	13	9	10	13	NC	19	72
19	(United Kingdom) Will Bratt	12	Ret	14	25	19	14	18	22	17	17	13	6	15	18	Ret	NC	16	Ret	20	Ret	10	Ret	DNS	Ret	22	12	Ret				32
20	(United Kingdom) Ollie Jackson	10	Ret	DNS	16	NC	Ret	16	17	Ret	24	16	15	Ret	DNS	Ret	16	11	13	15	15	11	15	16	15	19	Ret	Ret	Ret	13	11	32
21	(United Kingdom) James Cole	Ret	13	Ret	22	18	17	17	14	14	18	17	13	19	Ret	15																11
22	(United Kingdom) Michael Caine													8	Ret	DNS																8
23	(United Kingdom) Jake Hill													18	17	Ret													14	11	15	8
24	(United Kingdom) Lea Wood	16	Ret	DSQ	24	17	Ret	21	20	16	19	18	Ret	22	16	16	19	13	15	19	19	12	20	19	16	20	16	20	18	16	22	8
25	(United Kingdom) Liam Griffin	17	11	15	20	Ret	Ret	20	Ret	Ret	20	19	16				Ret	Ret	Ret	17	18	Ret	Ret	Ret	DNS	Ret	Ret	DNS	19	Ret	Ret	6
26	(United Kingdom) Howard Fuller																						17	17	Ret	17	11	15				6
27	(United Kingdom) James Kaye	15	12	DNS	19	Ret	Ret	Ret	Ret	19				Ret	19	Ret	Ret	19	DNS													5
28	(United Kingdom) Kieran Gallagher																			22	20	13										3
29	(United Kingdom) Aiden Moffat																			21	Ret	DNS				21	14	19	17	15	17	3
30	(United Kingdom) David Nye	18	Ret	17	23	Ret	DNS	22	21	18	22	22	NC	21	15	Ret	20	Ret	18	Ret	21	14	21	21	19							3
31	(United States) Robb Holland																21	15	14													3
32	(United Kingdom) Warren Scott	22	15	Ret	26	Ret	19	Ret	Ret	21	Ret	DNS	Ret	DNS	DNS	DNS	Ret	DNS	DNS	DNS	16	Ret	19	18	17	16	Ret	16	Ret	Ret	Ret	1
33	(United Kingdom) Shaun Hollamby																												15	17	23	1
34	(United Kingdom) Andy Neate																22	17	16				Ret	DNS	DNS	Ret	17	18				0
35	(United Kingdom) Tom Barley																												16	Ret	20	0
36	(United Kingdom) Mike Bushell																			18	17	Ret										0
37	(United Kingdom) Joe Girling	Ret	DNS	18	21	Ret	18	23	Ret	20				DNS	DNS	DNS																0
38	(United Kingdom) Andy Wilmot																						18	20	18							0
39	(United Kingdom) Aaron Mason										21	Ret	DNS																			0
	(United Kingdom) Paul O'Neill																			Ret	DNS	Ret										0
Pos	Driver	BHI			DON			THR			OUL			CRO			SNE			KNO			ROC			SIL			BHGP			Pts

- Note: **bold** signifies pole position (1 point given in first race only, and race 2 and 3 poles are based on race results), italics signifies fastest lap (1 point given all races) and * signifies at least one lap in the lead (1 point given all races).

=== Manufacturers'/Constructors' Championship ===
Pos	Manufacturer/Constructor	BHI			DON			THR			OUL			CRO			SNE			KNO			ROC			SIL			BHGP			Pts
1	Honda / Team Dynamics	19	4	1	1	3	2	1	1	1	3	2	4	2	2	1	3	2	1	2	3	2	4	2	5	3	6	1	2	7	1	939
1	Honda / Team Dynamics	21	DSQ	2	3	4	3	25	3	2	6	4	17	3	4	4	9	7	8	7	5	Ret	14	Ret	7	11	7	3	6	Ret	14	939
2	MG / Triple Eight Race Engineering	1	1	3	4	2	4	2	5	8	1	1	7	5	20	6	1	18	5	4	7	5	5	5	3	1	1	7	1	1	10	895
2	MG / Triple Eight Race Engineering	4	5	5	6	6	8	4	7	22	2	21	Ret	7	21	7	2	Ret	Ret	9	8	Ret	16	6	6	2	4	14	3	2	12	895
Pos	Manufacturer/Constructor	BHI			DON			THR			OUL			CRO			SNE			KNO			ROC			SIL			BHGP			Pts

=== Teams' Championship ===
Pos	Team	BHI			DON			THR			OUL			CRO			SNE			KNO			ROC			SIL			BHGP			Pts
1	Honda Yuasa Racing Team	21	4	1	3	4	3	1	1	2	3	2	4	2	2	1	3	2	1	2	3	2	4	2	5	3	6	1	2	7	1	721
1	Honda Yuasa Racing Team	19	DSQ	2	1	3	2	25	3	1	6	4	17	3	4	4	9	7	8	7	5	Ret	14	Ret	7	11	7	3	6	Ret	14	721
2	MG KX Momentum Racing	1	1	5	4	2	8	2	5	22	1	1	7	5	20	6	1	18	5	4	7	5	5	5	3	1	1	7	1	1	10	642
2	MG KX Momentum Racing	4	5	3	6	6	4	4	7	8	2	21	Ret	7	21	7	2	Ret	Ret	9	8	Ret	16	6	6	2	4	14	3	2	12	642
3	eBay Motors	8	8	9	8	9	1	6	11	10	5	3	2	1	1	2	4	6	6	1	1	3	6	3	2	4	5	11	7	12	4	531
3	eBay Motors	NC	10	13	15	12	12	13	13	13	10	15	8	4	6	8	10	12	9	9	4	8	7	12	13	5	13	12	Ret	14	8	531
4	Pirtek Racing	2	2	6	2	1	13	11	4	3	4	5	1	6	5	3	5	1	7	8	6	1	1	8	1	6	2	5	5	Ret	9	511
4	Pirtek Racing	5	3	7	10	11	10	5	6	6	11	10	18	12	10	10	13	Ret	19				12	10	10	18	DNS	DNS				511
5	Airwaves Racing	9	Ret	11	11	8	7	9	10	5	7	14	10	14	12	9	6	3	2	10	9	7	2	4	4	8	3	2	4	3	3	442
5	Airwaves Racing	20	7	10	12	13	9	7	15	7	Ret	20	19	Ret	Ret	13	8	4	3	12	Ret	15	13	9	12	9	10	4	9	5	5	442
6	Ciceley Racing	7	6	4	5	5	5	10	8	12	9	7	3	11	8	Ret	7	5	4	5	Ret	9	Ret	11	11	7	Ret	8	8	8	7	232
7	Speedworks Motorsport	Ret	9	Ret	9	7	Ret	8	12	9	8	6	14	Ret	9	5	16	8	13	11	10	11	8	7	8	10	8	6	11	4	6	219
7	Speedworks Motorsport	10	Ret	DNS	16	NC	Ret	16	17	Ret	24	16	15	Ret	DNS	Ret	18	11	Ret	15	15	Ret	15	16	15	19	Ret	Ret	Ret	13	11	219
8	WIX Racing	3	Ret	Ret	14	Ret	DNS	19	18	Ret	13	8	5	13	14	11	15	14	12	3	2	4	3	1	9	12	Ret	17	Ret	Ret	18	150
9	PPCGB.com/Kraftwerk Racing	14	Ret	16	13	10	6	3	2	4	15	11	Ret	10	3	12	12	9	17	13	13	Ret	18	20	18	21	14	19	17	15	17	121
10	RCIB Insurance Racing	13	Ret	NC	18	14	16	12	9	Ret	16	17	12	16	NC	15	11	15	14	22	20	13	9	14	Ret	17	11	9	12	6	2	106
10	RCIB Insurance Racing	Ret	13	Ret	22	18	17	17	14	14	18	Ret	13	19	Ret	Ret	21	DNS	Ret	Ret	DNS	Ret	17	17	Ret	Ret	15	15	16	Ret	20	106
11	Dynojet	6	Ret	8	7	Ret	Ret	15	19	Ret	23	12	9	20	13	Ret	Ret	10	11	14	12	Ret	10	13	Ret	14	Ret	DNS	Ret	10	21	79
12	Welch Motorsport with Sopp + Sopp	11	14	12	NC	15	11	14	Ret	11	14	9	NC	17	11	Ret	17	Ret	18	Ret	11	6	21	21	19	13	9	10	13	NC	19	79
12	Welch Motorsport with Sopp + Sopp	18	Ret	17	23	Ret	DNS	22	21	18	22	22	Ret	21	15	Ret	20	Ret	20	Ret	21	14	Ret	DNS	DNS							79
13	Rob Austin Racing	12	Ret	14	25	19	14	18	22	17	17	13	6	15	18	Ret	NC	16	Ret	20	Ret	10	Ret	DNS	Ret	22	12	Ret				25
14	Addison Lee Motorbase	18	11	15	20	Ret	Ret	20	Ret	Ret	20	19	16	8	17	Ret	Ret	Ret	Ret	17	18	Ret	Ret	Ret	DNS	Ret	Ret	DNS	19	Ret	Ret	15
14	Addison Lee Motorbase													18	Ret	DNS																15
15	Wheel Heaven/Houseman Racing	16	Ret	DSQ	24	17	Ret	21	20	16	19	18	Ret	22	16	16	19	13	15	19	19	12	20	19	16	20	16	20	18	16	22	14
16	Exocet Racing																												14	11	15	11
17	Team BMR Restart	22	15	Ret	26	Ret	19	Ret	Ret	21	Ret	DNS	Ret	DNS	DNS	DNS	Ret	DNS	DNS	DNS	16	Ret	19	18	17	16	Ret	16	Ret	Ret	Ret	4
18	AmD Tuning.com	15	12	DNS	19	Ret	Ret	Ret	Ret	19	21	Ret	DNS	Ret	19	Ret	Ret	19	DNS										15	17	23	2
19	Team Club 44																22	17	16	18	17	Ret	Ret	DNS	DNS	Ret	17	18				1
20	M247 Racing	DNS	DNS	18	21	Ret	18	23	Ret	20				DNS	DNS	DNS																0
21	Finesse Motorsport																			21	Ret	DNS										0
Pos	Team	BHI			DON			THR			OUL			CRO			SNE			KNO			ROC			SIL			BHGP			Pts

=== Independents' Trophy ===
Pos	Driver	BHI			DON			THR			OUL			CRO			SNE			KNO			ROC			SIL			BHGP			Pts
1	(United Kingdom) Andrew Jordan	**2**	**2**	6	2	**1**	13	**11**	4	3	4	**5**	1	6	5	3	**5**	1	7	8	6	**1**	1	**8**	**1**	6	2	5	**5**	Ret	9	471
2	(United Kingdom) Colin Turkington	8	8	9	8	9	1	6	11	10	5	3	2	**1**	**1**	2	4	**6**	6	1	**1**	DSQ	6	3	2	4	**5**	**Ret**	Ret	12	4	411
3	(United Kingdom) Adam Morgan	7	6	4	5	5	5	10	8	12	9	7	3	11	8	**Ret**	7	5	4	5	Ret	9	Ret	11	11	7	Ret	8	8	8	7	324
4	(United Kingdom) Mat Jackson	20	7	**10**	12	13	9	7	15	7	7	20	19	Ret	Ret	13	8	4	2	12	9	7	2	4	4	9	10	4	9	3	3	308
5	(Republic of Ireland) Árón Smith	9	Ret	11	11	8	7	9	10	5	Ret	14	10	14	12	9	6	3	3	10	Ret	15	13	15	14	8	3	2	10	5	5	288
6	(United Kingdom) Dave Newsham	Ret	9	Ret	9	7	Ret	8	12	9	**8**	6	14	Ret	9	5	18	8	**Ret**	11	10	Ret	8	7	8	**10**	8	6	11	4	6	260
7	(United Kingdom) Tom Onslow-Cole	12	Ret	16	13	10	**6**	3	**2**	4	15	11	Ret	10	3	12	12	9	17	13	13	Ret	Ret	9	12	15	Ret	13	4	**9**	13	243
8	(United Kingdom) Rob Collard	Ret	Ret	Ret	15	12	12	13	13	15	10	NC	11	9	6	14	10	Ret	9	6	4	3	7	Ret	Ret	5	Ret	12	7	14	8	214
9	(United Kingdom) Rob Austin	3	Ret	Ret	14	Ret	DNS	19	18	Ret	13	8	5	13	14	11	15	14	12	**3**	2	4	**3**	1	9	12	Ret	17	Ret	Ret	18	200
10	(United Kingdom) Jeff Smith	5	3	7	10	11	10	5	6	6	11	10	**18**	12	10	10	13	Ret	19				12	10	10	18	DNS	DNS				200
11	(United Kingdom) Nick Foster	NC	10	13	17	16	15	24	16	13	12	15	8	4	7	8	14	12	10	16	14	8	11	12	12	Ret	13	11	Ret	18	16	182
12	(United Kingdom) Daniel Welch	11	14	12	NC	15	11	14	Ret	11	14	9	Ret	17	11	Ret	17	Ret	20	Ret	11	6	Ret	DNS	DNS	13	9	10	13	NC	19	133
13	(United Kingdom) Jack Goff	13	Ret	NC	18	14	16	12	9	**Ret**	16	Ret	12	16	NC	Ret	11	DNS	Ret				9	14	Ret	Ret	15	9	12	6	**2**	128
14	(United Kingdom) Frank Wrathall	6	Ret	8	**7**	Ret	Ret	15	19	Ret	23	12	9	20	13	Ret	Ret	10	11	14	12	Ret	10	13	Ret	14	Ret	DNS	Ret	10	21	126
15	(United Kingdom) Ollie Jackson	10	Ret	DNS	16	NC	Ret	16	17	Ret	24	16	15	Ret	DNS	Ret	16	11	13	15	15	11	15	16	15	19	Ret	Ret	Ret	13	11	84
16	(United Kingdom) Will Bratt	12	Ret	14	25	19	14	18	22	17	17	13	6	15	18	Ret	NC	16	Ret	20	Ret	10	Ret	DNS	Ret	22	12	Ret				65
17	(United Kingdom) Lea Wood	16	Ret	DSQ	24	17	Ret	21	20	16	19	18	Ret	22	16	16	19	13	15	19	19	12	20	19	16	20	16	20	18	16	22	47
18	(United Kingdom) James Cole	Ret	13	Ret	22	18	17	17	14	14	18	17	13	19	Ret	15																39
19	(United Kingdom) Jake Hill													18	17	Ret													14	11	15	22
20	(United Kingdom) Howard Fuller																						17	17	Ret	17	11	15				22
21	(United Kingdom) Warren Scott	22	15	Ret	26	Ret	19	Ret	Ret	21	Ret	DNS	Ret	DNS	DNS	DNS	Ret	DNS	DNS	DNS	16	Ret	19	18	17	16	Ret	16	Ret	Ret	Ret	22
22	(United Kingdom) Liam Griffin	17	8	11	20	Ret	Ret	20	Ret	Ret	20	19	16				Ret	Ret	Ret	17	18	Ret	Ret	Ret	DNS	Ret	Ret	DNS	19	Ret	Ret	22
23	(United Kingdom) Aiden Moffat																			21	Ret	DNS				21	14	19	17	15	17	17
24	(United Kingdom) Michael Caine													8	Ret	DNS																13
25	(United Kingdom) David Nye	18	Ret	17	23	Ret	DNS	22	21	18	22	22	NC	21	15	Ret	20	Ret	18	Ret	21	14	21	21	19							13
26	(United Kingdom) James Kaye	15	12	DNS	19	Ret	Ret	Ret	Ret	19				Ret	19	Ret	Ret	19	DNS													11
27	(United Kingdom) Andy Neate																22	17	16				Ret	DNS	DNS	Ret	17	18				9
28	(United States) Robb Holland																21	15	14													8
29	(United Kingdom) Shaun Hollamby																												15	17	23	7
30	(United Kingdom) Kieran Gallagher																			22	20	13										5
31	(United Kingdom) Mike Bushell																			18	17	Ret										5
32	(United Kingdom) Andy Wilmot																						18	20	18							4
33	(United Kingdom) Joe Girling	DNS	DNS	18	21	Ret	18	23	Ret	20				DNS	DNS	DNS																4
34	(United Kingdom) Aaron Mason										21	Ret	DNS																			0
	(United Kingdom) Paul O'Neill																			Ret	DNS	Ret										0
Pos	Driver	BHI			DON			THR			OUL			CRO			SNE			KNO			ROC			SIL			BHGP			Pts

=== Independents Teams' Trophy ===
Pos	Team	BHI			DON			THR			OUL			CRO			SNE			KNO			ROC			SIL			BHGP			Pts
1	Pirtek Racing	2	2	6	2	1	10	5	4	3	4	5	1	6	5	3	5	1	7	8	6	1	1	8	1	6	2	5	5	Ret	9	498
2	eBay Motors	8	8	9	8	9	1	6	11	10	5	3	2	1	1	2	4	6	6	1	1	3	6	3	2	4	5	11	7	12	4	466
3	Airwaves Racing	9	7	10	11	8	7	7	10	5	7	14	10	14	12	9	6	3	2	10	9	7	2	4	4	8	3	2	4	3	3	413
4	Ciceley Racing	7	6	4	5	5	5	10	8	12	9	7	3	11	8	Ret	7	5	4	5	Ret	9	Ret	11	11	7	Ret	8	8	8	7	353
5	Speedworks Motorsport	10	9	Ret	9	7	Ret	8	12	9	8	6	14	Ret	9	5	16	8	13	11	10	11	8	7	8	10	8	6	11	4	6	314
6	WIX Racing	3	Ret	Ret	14	Ret	DNS	19	18	Ret	13	8	5	13	14	11	15	14	12	3	2	4	3	1	9	12	Ret	17	Ret	Ret	18	266
7	PPCGB.com/Kraftwerk Racing	14	Ret	16	13	10	6	3	2	4	15	11	Ret	10	3	12	12	9	17	13	13	Ret	18	20	18	21	14	19	17	15	17	262
8	RCIB Insurance Racing	13	13	NC	18	14	16	12	9	14	16	17	12	16	NC	15	11	15	14	22	20	13	9	14	Ret	17	11	9	12	6	2	231
9	Welch Motorsport with Sopp + Sopp	11	14	12	23	15	11	14	21	11	14	9	NC	17	11	Ret	17	Ret	18	Ret	11	6	21	21	19	13	9	10	13	NC	19	198
10	Dynojet	6	Ret	8	7	Ret	Ret	15	19	Ret	23	12	9	20	13	Ret	Ret	10	11	14	12	Ret	10	13	Ret	14	Ret	DNS	Ret	10	21	171
11	Wheel Heaven/Houseman Racing	16	Ret	DSQ	24	17	Ret	21	20	16	19	18	Ret	22	16	16	19	13	15	19	19	12	20	19	16	20	16	20	18	16	22	147
12	Addison Lee Motorbase	17	11	15	20	Ret	Ret	20	Ret	Ret	20	19	16	8	17	Ret	Ret	Ret	Ret	17	18	Ret	Ret	Ret	DNS	Ret	Ret	DNS	19	Ret	Ret	80
13	Rob Austin Racing	12	Ret	14	25	19	14	18	22	17	17	13	6	15	18	Ret	NC	16	Ret	20	Ret	10	Ret	DNS	Ret	22	12	Ret				66
14	Team BMR Restart	22	15	Ret	26	Ret	19	Ret	Ret	21	Ret	DNS	Ret	DNS	DNS	DNS	Ret	DNS	DNS	DNS	16	Ret	19	18	17	16	Ret	16	Ret	Ret	Ret	62
15	AmD Tuning.com	15	12	DNS	19	Ret	Ret	Ret	Ret	19	21	Ret	DNS	Ret	19	Ret	Ret	19	DNS										15	17	23	40
16	Team Club 44																22	17	16	18	17	Ret	Ret	DNS	DNS	Ret	17	18				39
17	Exocet Racing																												14	11	15	27
18	M247 Racing	DNS	DNS	18	21	Ret	18	23	Ret	20				DNS	DNS	DNS																24
19	Finesse Motorsport																			21	Ret	DNS										3
Pos	Team	BHI			DON			THR			OUL			CRO			SNE			KNO			ROC			SIL			BHGP			Pts

=== Jack Sears Trophy ===
Pos	Driver	BHI			DON			THR			OUL			CRO			SNE			KNO			ROC			SIL			BHGP			Cups
1	(United Kingdom) Lea Wood	**16**	Ret	DSQ	24	17	**Ret**	21	20	**16**	**19**	**18**	**Ret**	**22**	16	16	**19**	**13**	**15**	19	19	12	**20**	**19**	**16**	**20**	**16**	**20**	**18**	16	**22**	18
2	(United Kingdom) Liam Griffin	17	11	**15**	20	Ret	Ret	20	**Ret**	Ret	20	19	16				Ret	Ret	Ret	**17**	**18**	**Ret**	Ret	Ret	DNS	Ret	Ret	DNS	19	Ret	Ret	6
3	(United Kingdom) James Kaye	15	**12**	DNS	**19**	**Ret**	Ret	Ret	Ret	19				Ret	19	Ret	Ret	19	DNS													2
4	(United Kingdom) David Nye	18	Ret	17	23	Ret	DNS	22	21	18	22	22	NC	21	15	**Ret**	20	Ret	18	Ret	21	14	21	21	19							1
4	(United Kingdom) Joe Girling	DNS	DNS	18	21	Ret	18	**23**	Ret	20				DNS	DNS	DNS																1
4	(United Kingdom) Jake Hill													18	**17**	Ret																1
4	(United Kingdom) Shaun Hollamby																												15	**17**	23	1
8	(United Kingdom) Warren Scott	22	15	Ret	26	Ret	19	Ret	Ret	21	Ret	DNS	Ret	DNS	DNS	DNS																0
8	(United Kingdom) Aaron Mason										21	Ret	DNS																			0
8	(United Kingdom) Aiden Moffat																			21	Ret	DNS										0
Pos	Driver	BHI			DON			THR			OUL			CRO			SNE			KNO			ROC			SIL			BHGP			Cups
