= Aiden Moffat =

British racing driver (born 1996)

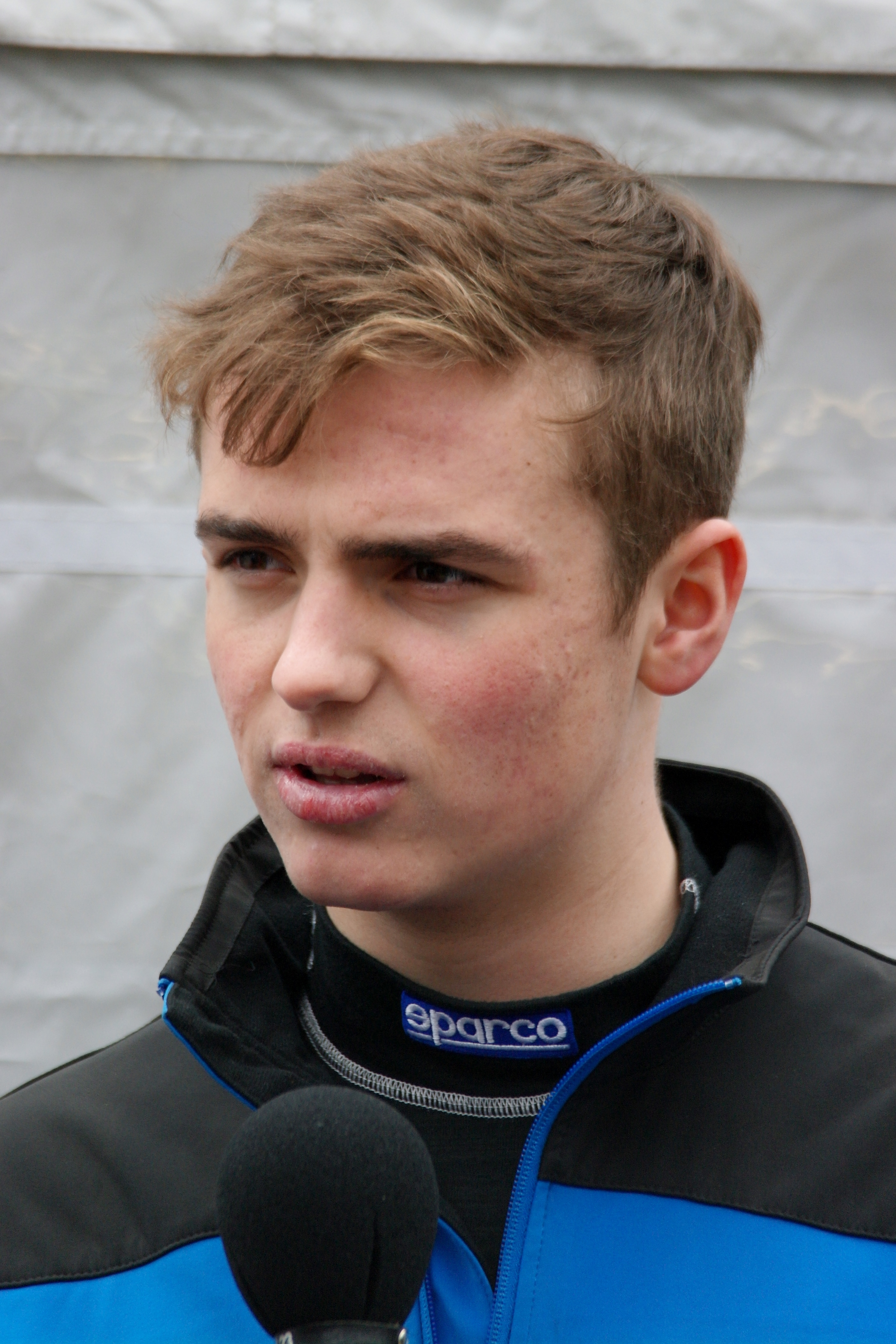
- Moffat at the Donington round of the 2014 British Touring Car Championship season.
- Nationality: (United Kingdom) British
- Born: Aiden Robert Moffat; 28 September 1996 (age 30) Dalkeith, Scotland

British Touring Car Championship career
- Debut season: 2013
- Current team: LKQ Euro Car Parts with Power Maxed Racing
- Car number: 16
- Former teams: PPCGB.com/Kraftwerk Racing; Finesse Motorsport; Laser Tools Racing; One Motorsport; LKQ Euro Car Parts with SYNETIQ; LKQ Euro Car Parts Racing with WSR
- Starts: 390
- Championships: 0
- Wins: 6
- Podiums: 18
- Poles: 2
- Fastest laps: 2
- Best finish: 8th in 2021

Previous series
- 2012: Ginetta Junior Championship

Aiden Robert Moffat (born 28 September 1996) is a British racing driver who is currently driving in the British Touring Car Championship for LKQ Euro Car Parts with Power Maxed Racing. He became the youngest driver ever to compete in the BTCC when he made his debut at the Knockhill round of the 2013 season.

== Career ==
=== British Touring Car Championship ===
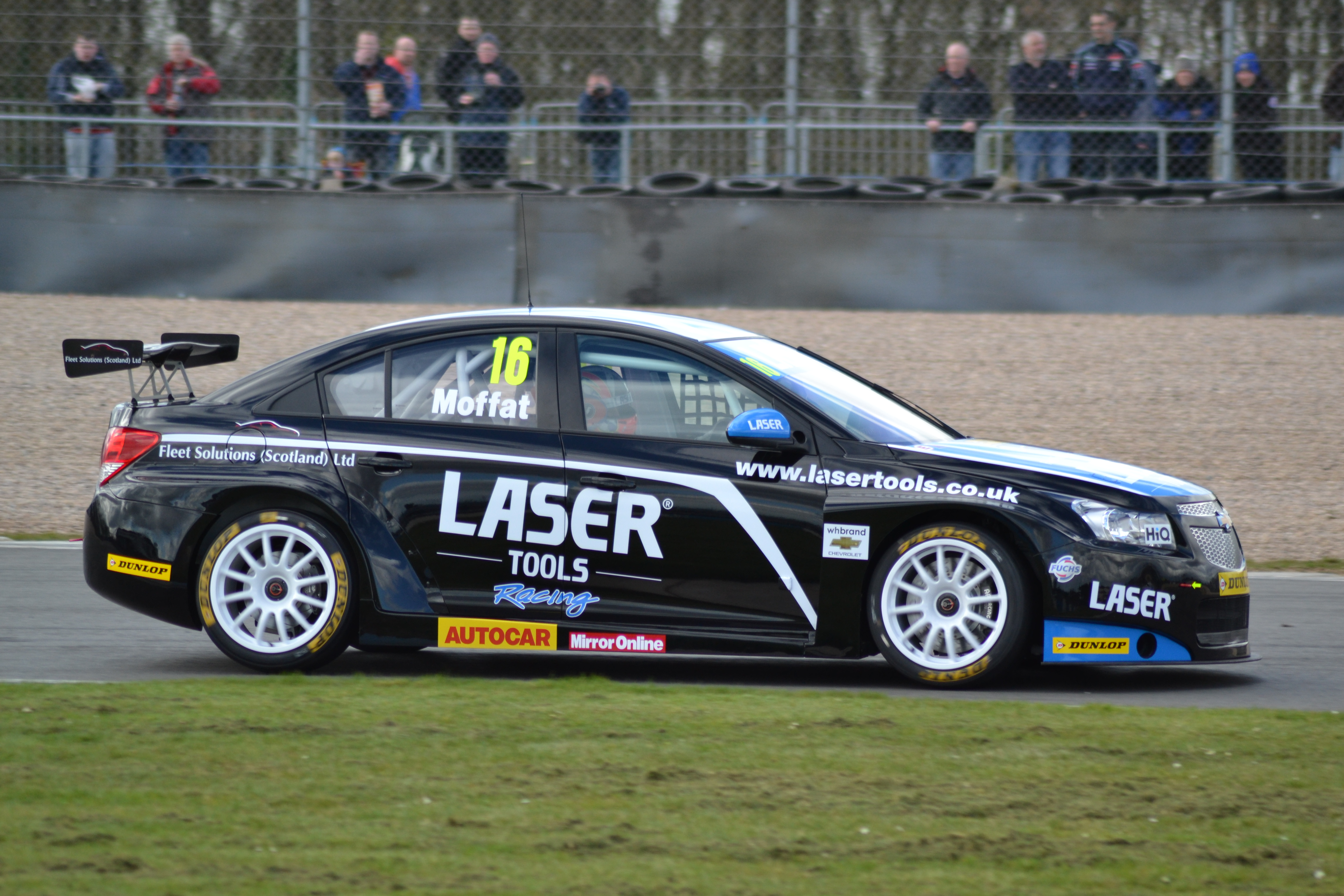
Moffat driving the Laser Tools Racing Chevrolet Cruze at Donington Park during the 2014 British Touring Car Championship season.

Moffat made his début in the British Touring Car Championship with Finesse Motorsport in the Jack Sears Trophy for S2000 cars at the Knockhill round of the 2013 season at the age of 16 years, ten months and 28 days, less than 12 months after racing in the Ginetta Junior series finale at Brands Hatch. This beat the record for youngest driver set by Tom Chilton when he made his debut in 2002 at the age of 17 years and 17 days.

Moffat missed the round at Rockingham due to clashing with his other racing commitments, prior to the next round at Silverstone he switched to Tony Gilham Racing where he would drive an NGTC Volkswagen CC for the remaining two rounds of the season.

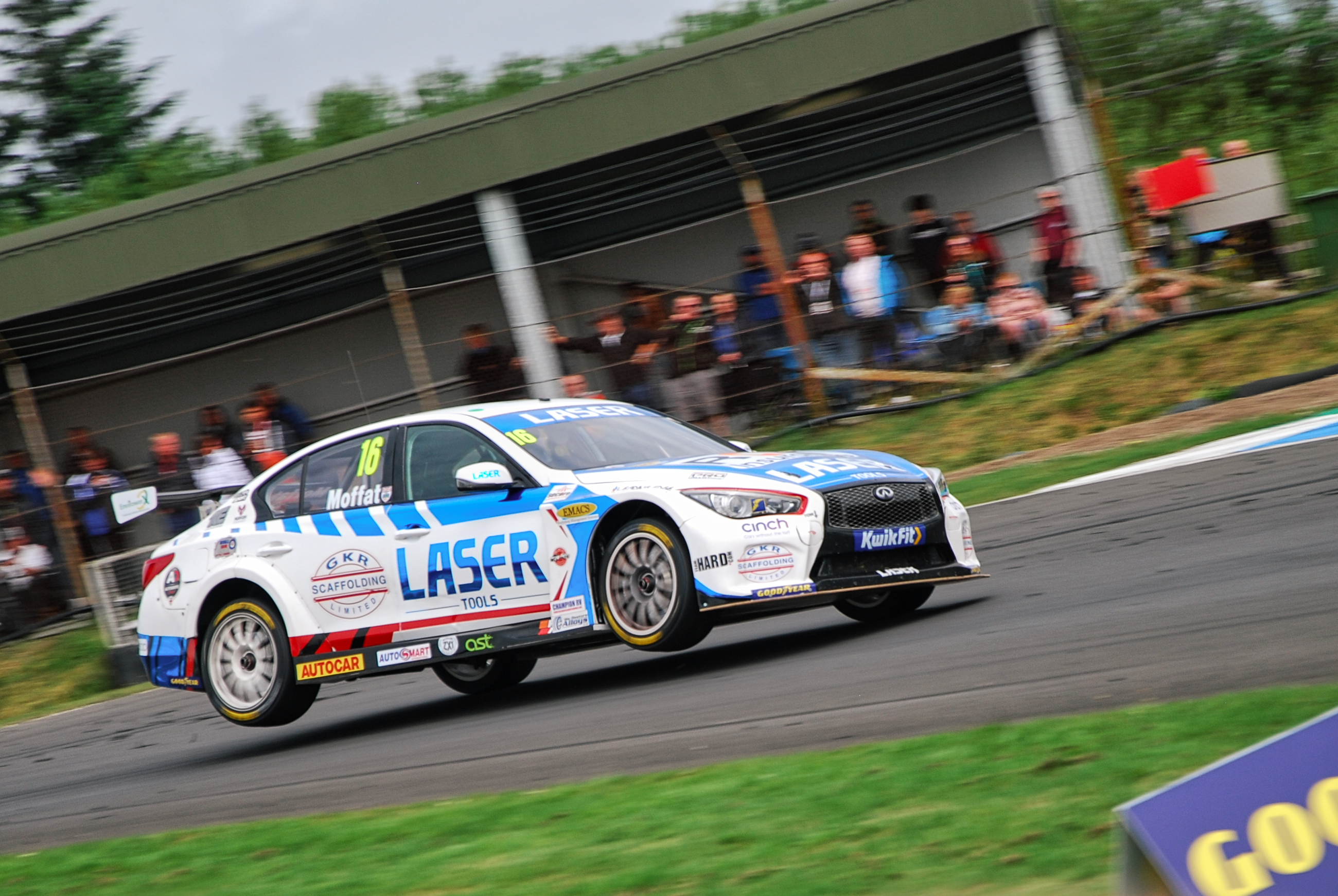
Moffat competing at Knockhill during the 2021 British Touring Car Championship.

He failed to score a point in the opening round of the 2017 BTCC Season, but took his first win in the next round at Donington Park. He would add a second victory in the final round at Brands Hatch.

For the 2018 BTCC season, Moffat continued with Laser Tools Racing, where he had been since the 2014 season. In September 2018, he scored maximum points with a win in the 3rd race in the penultimate round at Silverstone. Overall, he finished 12th in the overall drivers' standings and came 6th in the Independents' Trophy.

2019 came with a big change for Moffat and his team, Laser Tools Racing. Laser Tools made the bold switch from the front wheel drive of the Mercedes-Benz A-Class, to the rear-wheel-drive of the Infiniti Q50. This was the first time a Q50 appeared on the championship grid since 2015. The Q50 made its long awaited debut at Snetterton. Moffat came 21st, 20th, and 20th again at Snetterton. Like 2018, Moffat surprisingly excelled with the Infiniti at Silverstone, earning a 2nd place finish in Race 3. At the end of the season, Moffat placed 18th in the main Drivers' championship, with 89 points.

The 2020 season came as a roadblock for the championship and its drivers, due to COVID-19, with the season being delayed to August of that year. Aiden Moffat had a new teammate in the battle-worthy and aggressive, Ash Sutton. While, Sutton quickly adapted to the Q50, Moffat stayed back from challenging for the championship, focussing on consistently finishing in point positions'. At Brands Hatch, Aiden scored a season-best position, with 4th place in round 6 of the meeting in Kent. At the knife's edge of the season, the penultimate round of the championship at Snetterton, Moffat surprisingly came out on pole position. This was because of the draw for reverse pole in race 3 of the meeting.

Overall, Moffat came 15th in the Drivers' Championship and 10th in the Independents Championship. He also finished in point-scoring positions in over half of the season's 27 races, 15 to be exact.

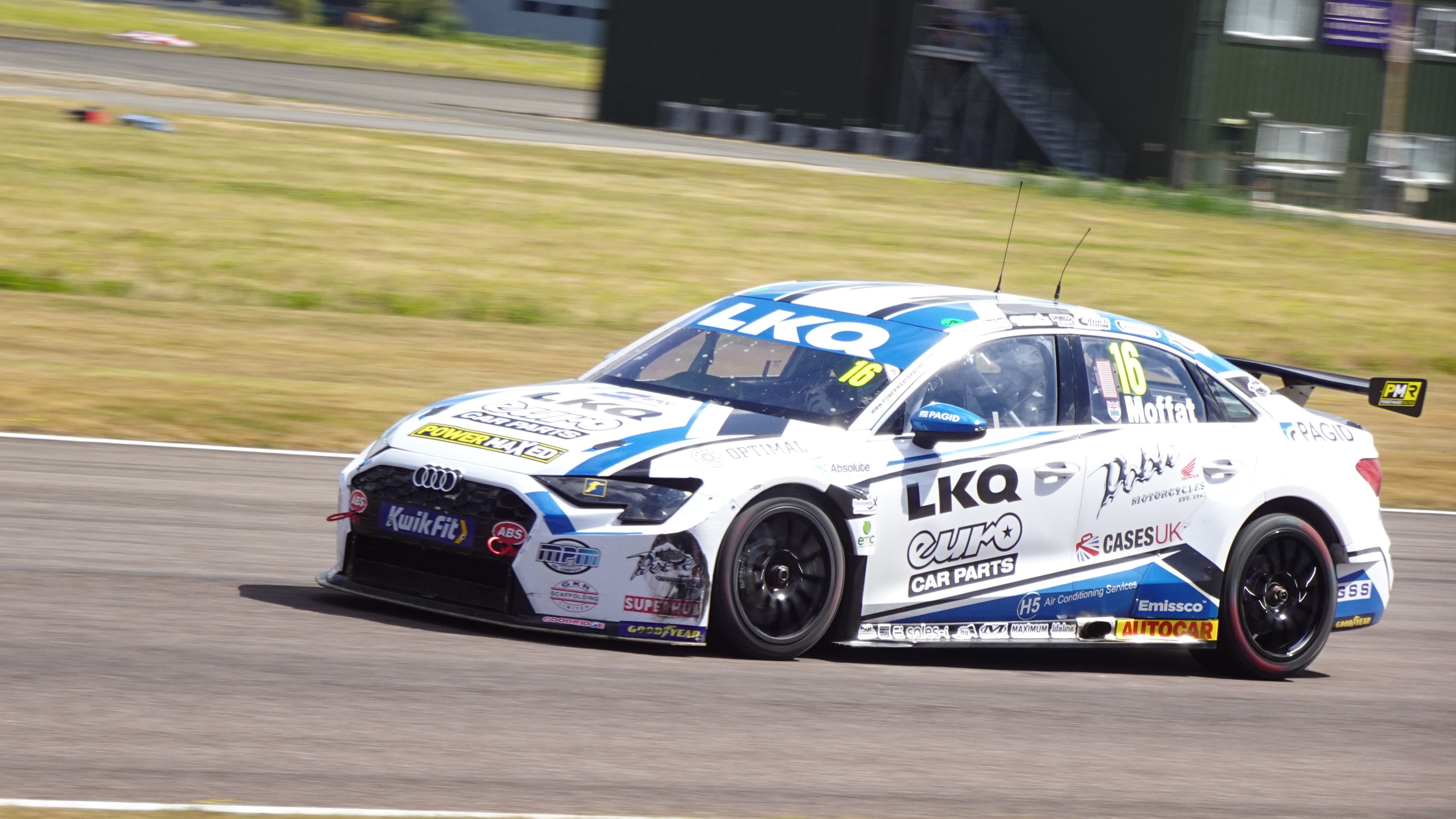
Moffat racing at Thruxton Circuit in 2026

2021 turned out to be Moffat's best ever season in the British Touring Car Championship. He took advantage of the Infiniti Q50's RWD technology and converted this into 25 out of 30 point-scoring finishes in the season. At Croft, Moffat took his first pole in race 1, in Saturday's qualifying. He challenged and pushed forward until the end of race, turning that pole into his fourth BTCC career victory. He successfully fended Jake Hill off from winning the first race. He then secured a second place finish in Race 2 at Croft, falling short to and trading places with Hill. Moffat was prosperous in beating Huddersfield's Dan Lloyd at Croft. Nevertheless, his teammate Ash Sutton took two from two Drivers' Championships, as Moffat made a name for himself with 4 podium finishes in the season.

At the end of the 2021 campaign for Moffat and Laser Tools, Moffat finished a highest finish of 8th place in the Drivers' Championship and 6th in the Independents'. Laser Tools finished top of the table for the Teams' and Independent Teams' Championships.

== Racing record ==
=== Complete British Touring Car Championship results ===
(key) (Races in bold indicate pole position – 1 point awarded just in first race; races in italics indicate fastest lap – 1 point awarded all races; * signifies that driver lead race for at least one lap – 1 point given all races; ^{Superscript} number indicates points-scoring qualifying race position)

Year	Team	Car	1	2	3	4	5	6	7	8	9	10	11	12	13	14	15	16	17	18	19	20	21	22	23	24	25	26	27	28	29	30	Pos	Points
2013	Finesse Motorsport	Chevrolet Cruze LT	BRH; 1	BRH; 2	BRH; 3	DON; 1	DON; 2	DON; 3	THR; 1	THR; 2	THR; 3	OUL; 1	OUL; 2	OUL; 3	CRO; 1	CRO; 2	CRO; 3	SNE; 1	SNE; 2	SNE; 3	KNO; 1; 21	KNO; 2 Ret	KNO; 3 DNS	ROC; 1	ROC; 2	ROC; 3							30th	3
2013	PPCGB/Kraftwerk Racing	Volkswagen CC																									SIL; 1; 21	SIL; 2; 14	SIL; 3; 19	BRH; 1; 17	BRH; 2; 15	BRH; 3; 17	30th	3
2014	Laser Tools Racing	Chevrolet Cruze 4dr	BRH; 1; 24	BRH; 2; 24	BRH; 3; 24	DON; 1; 22	DON; 2; 16	DON; 3; 20	THR; 1; 20	THR; 2; 21	THR; 3; 19	OUL; 1 Ret	OUL; 2 DNS	OUL; 3 DNS	CRO; 1; 20	CRO; 2 Ret	CRO; 3; 20	SNE; 1; 23	SNE; 2; 17	SNE; 3; 16	KNO; 1; 19	KNO; 2; 19	KNO; 3; 21	ROC; 1; 23	ROC; 2 Ret	ROC; 3 Ret	SIL; 1; 17	SIL; 2; 18	SIL; 3; 17	BRH; 1; 14	BRH; 2; 12	BRH; 3; 16	25th	6
2015	Laser Tools Racing	Mercedes-Benz A-Class	BRH; 1; 12	BRH; 2; 13	BRH; 3 Ret	DON; 1; 18	DON; 2; 16	DON; 3; 5	THR; 1; 15	THR; 2; 10	THR; 3; 16	OUL; 1; 17	OUL; 2; 12	OUL; 3; 11	CRO; 1; 17	CRO; 2; 18	CRO; 3; 13	SNE; 1 DNS	SNE; 2 DNS	SNE; 3 DNS	KNO; 1; 22	KNO; 2; 9	KNO; 3; 3	ROC; 1 Ret	ROC; 2; 13	ROC; 3 Ret	SIL; 1; 20	SIL; 2; 13	SIL; 3; 10	BRH; 1; 14	BRH; 2; 24	BRH; 3; 13	17th	77
2016	Laser Tools Racing	Mercedes-Benz A-Class	BRH; 1; 12	BRH; 2; 11	BRH; 3; 9	DON; 1; 16	DON; 2; 9	DON; 3; 7	THR; 1; 22	THR; 2; 16	THR; 3; 22	OUL; 1; 32	OUL; 2 Ret	OUL; 3; 20	CRO; 1 Ret	CRO; 2; 17	CRO; 3 Ret	SNE; 1; 23	SNE; 2; 11	SNE; 3; 8	KNO; 1; 13	KNO; 2; 10	KNO; 3; 8	ROC; 1; 11	ROC; 2; 9	ROC; 3; 9	SIL; 1; 9	SIL; 2; 9	SIL; 3; 9	BRH; 1; 8	BRH; 2; 6	BRH; 3; 2	14th	138
2017	Laser Tools Racing	Mercedes-Benz A-Class	BRH; 1; 18	BRH; 2 Ret	BRH; 3 Ret	DON; 1; 1*	**DON**; **2**; 14*	DON; 3; 8	THR; 1; 12	THR; 2; 9	THR; 3; 8	OUL; 1; 4	OUL; 2; 14	OUL; 3 Ret	CRO; 1; 23	CRO; 2; 14	CRO; 3 Ret	SNE; 1; 19	SNE; 2; 29	SNE; 3; 12	KNO; 1; 26	KNO; 2; 15	KNO; 3; 15	ROC; 1; 19	ROC; 2; 14	ROC; 3; 17	SIL; 1; 8	SIL; 2 Ret	SIL; 3; 14	BRH; 1; 1*	**BRH**; **2**; 5*	BRH; 3; 14	13th	121
2018	Laser Tools Racing	Mercedes-Benz A-Class	BRH; 1; 14	BRH; 2; 5*	BRH; 3; 21	DON; 1; 3	DON; 2; 15	DON; 3; 3	THR; 1; 18	THR; 2; 15	THR; 3; 15	OUL; 1; 16	OUL; 2 Ret	OUL; 3; 20	CRO; 1 Ret	CRO; 2; 16	CRO; 3; 17	SNE; 1; 16	SNE; 2; 13	SNE; 3 NC	ROC; 1; 8	ROC; 2 Ret	ROC; 3; 21	KNO; 1; 18	KNO; 2; 13	KNO; 3; 12	SIL; 1; 14	SIL; 2; 7	**SIL**; **3**; 1*	BRH; 1; 7	BRH; 2; 5	BRH; 3; 27	16th	117
2019	Laser Tools Racing	Mercedes-Benz A-Class	BRH; 1; 4	BRH; 2; 17	BRH; 3; 9	DON; 1; 14	DON; 2 NC	DON; 3; 14	THR; 1; 20	THR; 2; 17	THR; 3; 10	CRO; 1; 13	CRO; 2; 10	CRO; 3; 19	OUL; 1; 18	OUL; 2; 14	OUL; 3; 9																18th	89
2019	Laser Tools Racing	Infiniti Q50																SNE; 1; 17	SNE; 2; 19	SNE; 3; 21	THR; 1; 18	THR; 2; 24	THR; 3; 21	KNO; 1; 11	KNO; 2; 13	KNO; 3; 9	SIL; 1; 19	SIL; 2 NC	SIL; 3; 2	BRH; 1; 13	BRH; 2; 12	BRH; 3; 14	18th	89
2020	Laser Tools Racing	Infiniti Q50	DON; 1; 15	DON; 2; 20	DON; 3; 17	BRH; 1; 18	BRH; 2; 12	**BRH**; **3**; 4	OUL; 1; 17	OUL; 2; 16	OUL; 3; 10	KNO; 1; 9	KNO; 2; 5	KNO; 3; 8	THR; 1; 15	THR; 2; 18	THR; 3 NC	SIL; 1; 11	SIL; 2; 5	SIL; 3; 8	CRO; 1; 16	CRO; 2; 11	CRO; 3; 10	SNE; 1; 27	SNE; 2 NC	SNE; 3; 11	BRH; 1; 14	BRH; 2; 12	**BRH**; **3**; 8				15th	105
2021	Laser Tools Racing	Infiniti Q50	THR; 1; 11	THR; 2; 8	THR; 3 Ret	SNE; 1; 14	SNE; 2; 10	SNE; 3; 17	BRH; 1; 8	BRH; 2; 9	BRH; 3; 3	OUL; 1; 6	OUL; 2; 5	OUL; 3; 4	KNO; 1; 7	KNO; 2; 11	KNO; 3; 7	THR; 1; 18	THR; 2; 13	THR; 3; 13	**CRO**; **1**; 1*	**CRO**; **2**; 2	CRO; 3; 6	SIL; 1; 4	SIL; 2; 5	SIL; 3; 7	DON; 1; 13	DON; 2; 8	DON; 3; 3	BRH; 1; 8	BRH; 2; 22	BRH; 3; 18	8th	230
2022	Laser Tools Racing	Infiniti Q50	DON; 1; 15	DON; 2; 16	DON; 3; 26	BRH; 1; 22	BRH; 2; 24	BRH; 3; 15	THR; 1; 15	THR; 2; 25	THR; 3; 17	OUL; 1; 12	OUL; 2; 11	OUL; 3; 2	CRO; 1; 8	CRO; 2; 8	CRO; 3 Ret	KNO; 1; 13	KNO; 2; 12	KNO; 3; 10	SNE; 1 Ret	SNE; 2 Ret	SNE; 3; 17	THR; 1; 16	THR; 2; 16	THR; 3 Ret	SIL; 1 Ret	SIL; 2; 16	SIL; 3 Ret	BRH; 1; 15	BRH; 2; 12	BRH; 3; 10	18th	69
2023	One Motorsport with Starline Racing	Honda Civic Type R	DON; 1; 13	DON; 2; 17	DON; 3; 15	BRH; 1; 13	BRH; 2; 19	BRH; 3; 12	SNE; 1; 19	SNE; 2; 17	SNE; 3; 8	THR; 1; 14	THR; 2; 10	THR; 3; 3	OUL; 1; 20	OUL; 2; 15	OUL; 3; 6	CRO; 1; 13	CRO; 2; 17	CRO; 3; 6	KNO; 1 Ret	KNO; 2; 19	KNO; 3; 7	DON; 1; 18	DON; 2 Ret	DON; 3; 18	SIL; 1; 17	SIL; 2; 13	SIL; 3; 12	BRH; 1; 25	BRH; 2; 11	BRH; 3 Ret	16th	87
2024	LKQ Euro Car Parts with SYNETIQ	Toyota Corolla GR Sport	DON; 1; 9	DON; 2; 8	DON; 3; 1*	BRH; 1; 9	BRH; 2; 8	BRH; 3 Ret	SNE; 1; 21	SNE; 2; 8	SNE; 3; 2	THR; 1; 14	THR; 2; 12	THR; 3; 15	OUL; 1; 9	OUL; 2 Ret	OUL; 3; 10	CRO; 1; 14	CRO; 2; 10	CRO; 3 Ret	KNO; 1; 16	KNO; 2; 8	KNO; 3; 7	DON; 1; 11	DON; 2 Ret	DON; 3 Ret	SIL; 1; 14	SIL; 2; 17	SIL; 3 Ret	BRH; 1 Ret	BRH; 2; 8	BRH; 3; 9	13th	138
2025	LKQ Euro Car Parts Racing with WSR	BMW 330i M Sport LCI	DON; 1; 9	DON; 2; 7	DON; 3; 9	BRH; 1; 20	BRH; 2; 5	BRH; 3; 8	SNE; 1 DSQ	SNE; 2; 16	SNE; 3; 10	THR; 1; 14	THR; 2; 13	THR; 3; 12	OUL; 1; 15	OUL; 2; 16	OUL; 3; 11	CRO; 1; 13	CRO; 2; 9	**CRO**; **3**; 6	KNO; 1; 6	KNO; 2; 7	KNO; 3; 9	DON; 1; 15	DON; 2; 11	DON; 3; 13	SIL; 1; 6	SIL; 2; 8	SIL; 3; 6	BRH; 1; 20	BRH; 2; 9	**BRH**; **3**; 5*	11th	166
2026	LKQ Euro Car Parts with Power Maxed Racing	Audi S3 Saloon	DON; 1; 6^{8}	DON; 2; 4	DON; 3; 4	BRH; 1; 17	BRH; 2; 5	BRH; 3; 10	SNE; 1; 18	SNE; 2; 15	SNE; 3; 14	OUL; 1; 5^{9}	OUL; 2; 21	OUL; 3; 10	THR; 1; 15^{13}	THR; 2 Ret	THR; 3 Ret	KNO; 1; 9	KNO; 2 Ret	KNO; 3; 22	DON; 1; 11^{12}	DON; 2; 8	DON; 3; 2	CRO; 1; 6^{6}	CRO; 2; 9	CRO; 3; 6	SIL; 1; 1*^{2}	**SIL**; **2**; 9*	**SIL**; **3**; 3*	**BRH**; **1**; 4*^{1}	BRH; 2; 8	BRH; 3; 4	9th	254

=== Complete TCR UK Touring Car Championship results ===
(key) (Races in bold indicate pole position – 1 point awarded just in first race; races in italics indicate fastest lap – 1 point awarded all races; * signifies that driver led race for at least one lap – 1 point given all races)

Year	Team	Car	1	2	3	4	5	6	7	8	9	10	11	12	13	14	Pos	Pts
2018	Laser Tools Racing	Alfa Romeo Giulietta TCR	SIL; 1; 2	SIL; 2 Ret	KNO; 1 Ret	KNO; 2 DNS	BHI; 1	BHI; 1	CAS; 1	CAS; 2	OUL; 1	OUL; 2	CRO; 1	CRO; 2	DON; 1	DON; 2	11th	99
