= Tom Barley =

British racing driver (born 1987)

- Nationality: British
- Born: 3 September 1987 (age 39) Crayford, Kent, England

British Touring Car Championship career
- Debut season: 2013
- Car number: 47
- Former teams: RCIB Insurance Racing
- Starts: 3
- Best finish: 35th in 2013
- Finished last season: 35th

Previous series
- 2018: Britcar Endurance Championship

Tom Barley (born 9 March 1987) is a British racing driver. In 2013, Barley made a singular appearance in the British Touring Car Championship at Brands Hatch, driving for Team HARD in a Vauxhall Insignia NGTC.

== Racing record ==
=== Complete British Touring Car Championship results ===
(key) Races in bold indicate pole position (1 point awarded – 2001–2002 all races, 2003–present just for first race, 2001 in class) Races in italics indicate fastest lap (1 point awarded all races, 2001 in class) * signifies that driver lead race for at least one lap (1 point given – 2001–2002 just for feature race, 2003–present all races, 2001 in class)

Year	Team	Car	1	2	3	4	5	6	7	8	9	10	11	12	13	14	15	16	17	18	19	20	21	22	23	24	25	26	27	28	29	30	Pos	Pts
2013	RCIB Insurance Racing	Vauxhall Insignia	BRH; 1	BRH; 2	BRH; 3	DON; 1	DON; 2	DON; 3	THR; 1	THR; 2	THR; 3	OUL; 1	OUL; 2	OUL; 3	CRO; 1	CRO; 2	CRO; 3	SNE; 1	SNE; 2	SNE; 3	KNO; 1	KNO; 2	KNO; 3	ROC; 1	ROC; 2	ROC; 3	SIL; 1	SIL; 2	SIL; 3	BRH; 1; 16	BRH; 2 Ret	BRH; 3; 20	35th	0
