= David Nye (racing driver) =

British racing driver (born 1958)

David William Nye
- Nationality: (United Kingdom) British
- Born: January 3, 1958 (age 68) Horsham, United Kingdom

British Touring Car Championship career
- Debut season: 2013
- Current team: Welch Motorsport
- Car number: 12
- Starts: 23
- Wins: 0 (1 in class)
- Poles: 0
- Fastest laps: 0
- Best finish: 29th in 2013

Previous series
- 2007 2008 2009-2010 2010 2011 2012: Britcar 24hr Ford Fiesta Championship; SEAT Cupra Championship; SEAT León Supercopa Spain; SEAT León Eurocup; Belgian Touring Car Series; Supercar Challenge

David Nye (born 1 January 1958 in Horsham) is a British racing driver. When he started racing in 2008 he drove in the Ford Fiesta Championship, finishing third overall in Class A. He also drove in the SEAT Cupra Championship finishing 12th overall. For the next two years, he drove in the Spanish SEAT Cupra Championship in which he scored a total of ten points over both seasons. He also drove in a one-off race in the SEAT León Eurocup at Brands Hatch. In 2013, he drove in the British Touring Car Championship for Welch Motorsport.

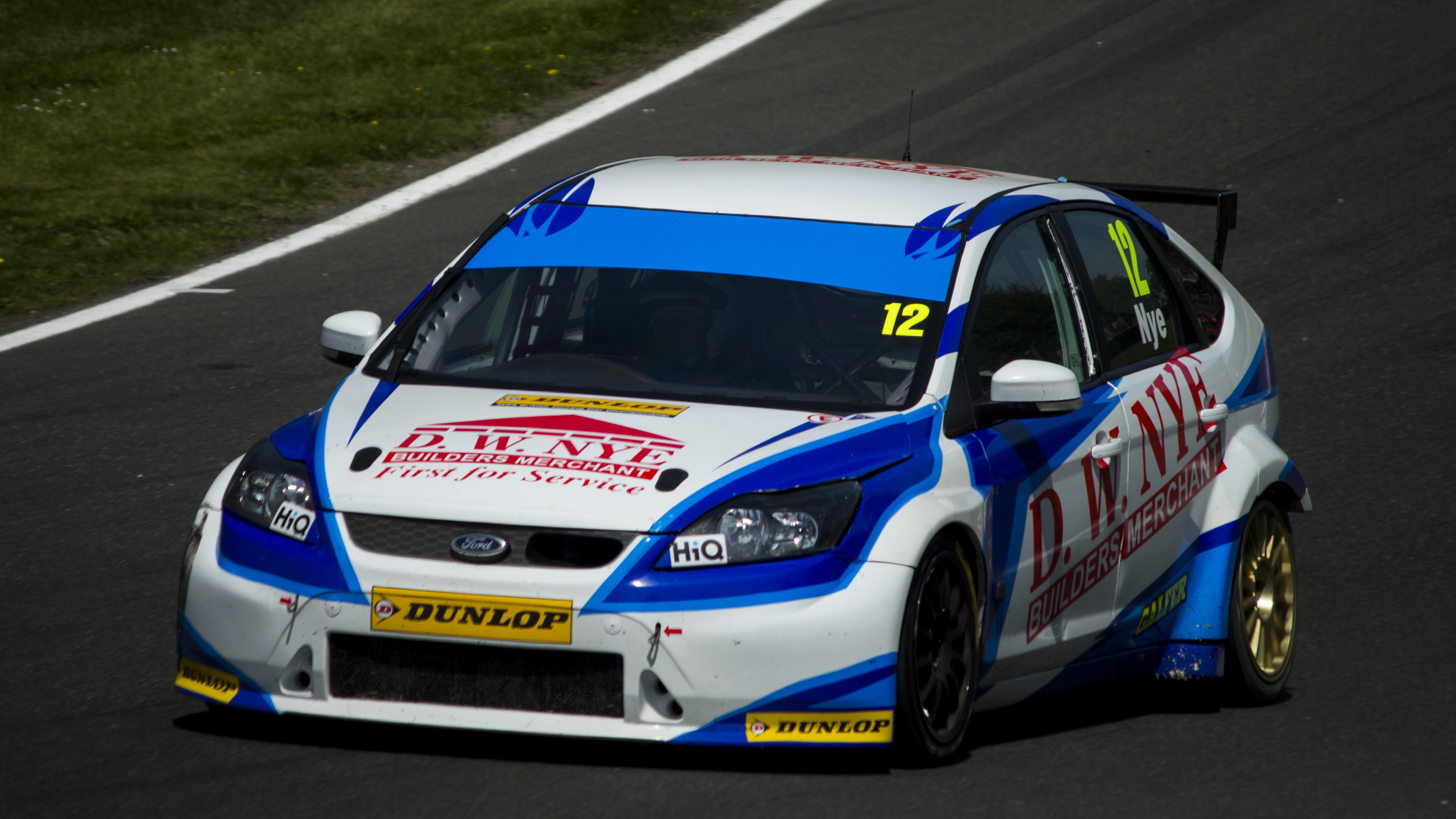
Nye driving the Welch Motorsport Ford Focus ST at Oulton Park during the 2013 British Touring Car Championship season.

== Racing record ==
=== Complete British Touring Car Championship results ===
(key) Races in bold indicate pole position (1 point awarded in first race) Races in italics indicate fastest lap (1 point awarded all races) * signifies that driver lead race for at least one lap (1 point awarded all races)

| Year | Team | Car | 1 | 2 | 3 | 4 | 5 | 6 | 7 | 8 | 9 | 10 | 11 | 12 | 13 | 14 | 15 | 16 | 17 | 18 | 19 | 20 | 21 | 22 | 23 | 24 | 25 | 26 | 27 | 28 | 29 | 30 | DC | Pts |
|---|---|---|---|---|---|---|---|---|---|---|---|---|---|---|---|---|---|---|---|---|---|---|---|---|---|---|---|---|---|---|---|---|---|---|
| 2013 | Welch Motorsport with Sopp+Sopp | Ford Focus ST Mk.II | BRH; 1; 18 | BRH; 2 Ret | BRH; 3; 17 | DON; 1; 23 | DON; 2 Ret | DON; 3 DNS | THR; 1; 22 | THR; 2; 21 | THR; 3; 18 | OUL; 1; 22 | OUL; 2; 22 | OUL; 3 NC | CRO; 1; 21 | CRO; 2; 15 | CRO; 3 Ret | SNE; 1; 20 | SNE; 2 Ret | SNE; 3; 18 | KNO; 1 Ret | KNO; 2; 21 | KNO; 3; 14 | ROC; 1; 21 | ROC; 2; 21 | ROC; 3; 19 | SIL; 1 | SIL; 2 | SIL; 3 | BRH; 1 | BRH; 2 | BRH; 3 | 29th | 3 |
