= Lea Wood =

British racing driver (born 1984)

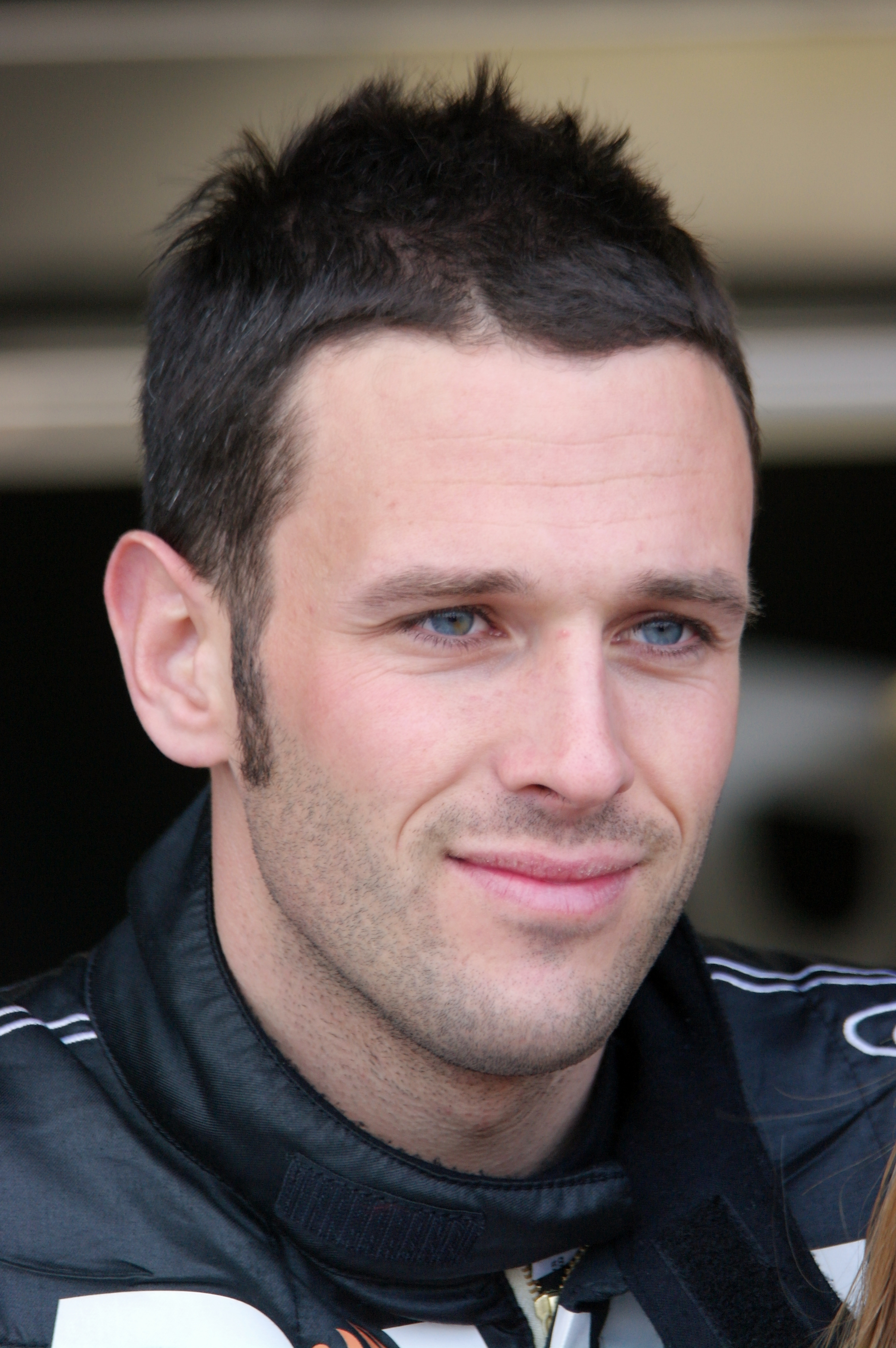
- Wood at the Donington Park round of the 2012 British Touring Car Championship season.
- Nationality: (United Kingdom) British
- Born: 18 August 1984 (age 42) Hereford, England

British Touring Car Championship career
- Debut season: 2010
- Current team: Houseman Racing
- Car number: 43
- Starts: 121
- Wins: 0 (18 in class)
- Poles: 0
- Fastest laps: 0
- Best finish: 14th in 2012

Previous series
- 2008 2004–07: Renault Clio Cup; BRSCC Super Silhouettes

Championship titles
- 2013 2007: Jack Sears Trophy; BRSCC Super Silhouettes

Lea Wood (born 18 August 1984) is a British racing driver and mechanic, employed at his father's garage based in Hereford. He has competed previously in the British Touring Car Championship.

== Racing career ==
=== Early years ===
Wood started club level karting in 1995 and progressed to the Mendips (Bristol) Raceway Minirod series, where he was champion in 2000. From 2001, he spent three years in oval Hot Rod racing in the south of England. In 2004, he competed in the BRSCC Super Silhouette Championship, driving an Audi TT. After finishing as runner-up in 2006 with a Vauxhall Tigra, he won the drivers title in 2007 in the Tigra. For 2008, he competed in the Renault Clio Cup, finishing 16th overall with a best race finish of second place at Oulton Park. He made a one-off appearance in 2009 in the Welsh Sports & Saloon Car series, winning his class in a Renault Clio.

=== British Touring Car Championship ===
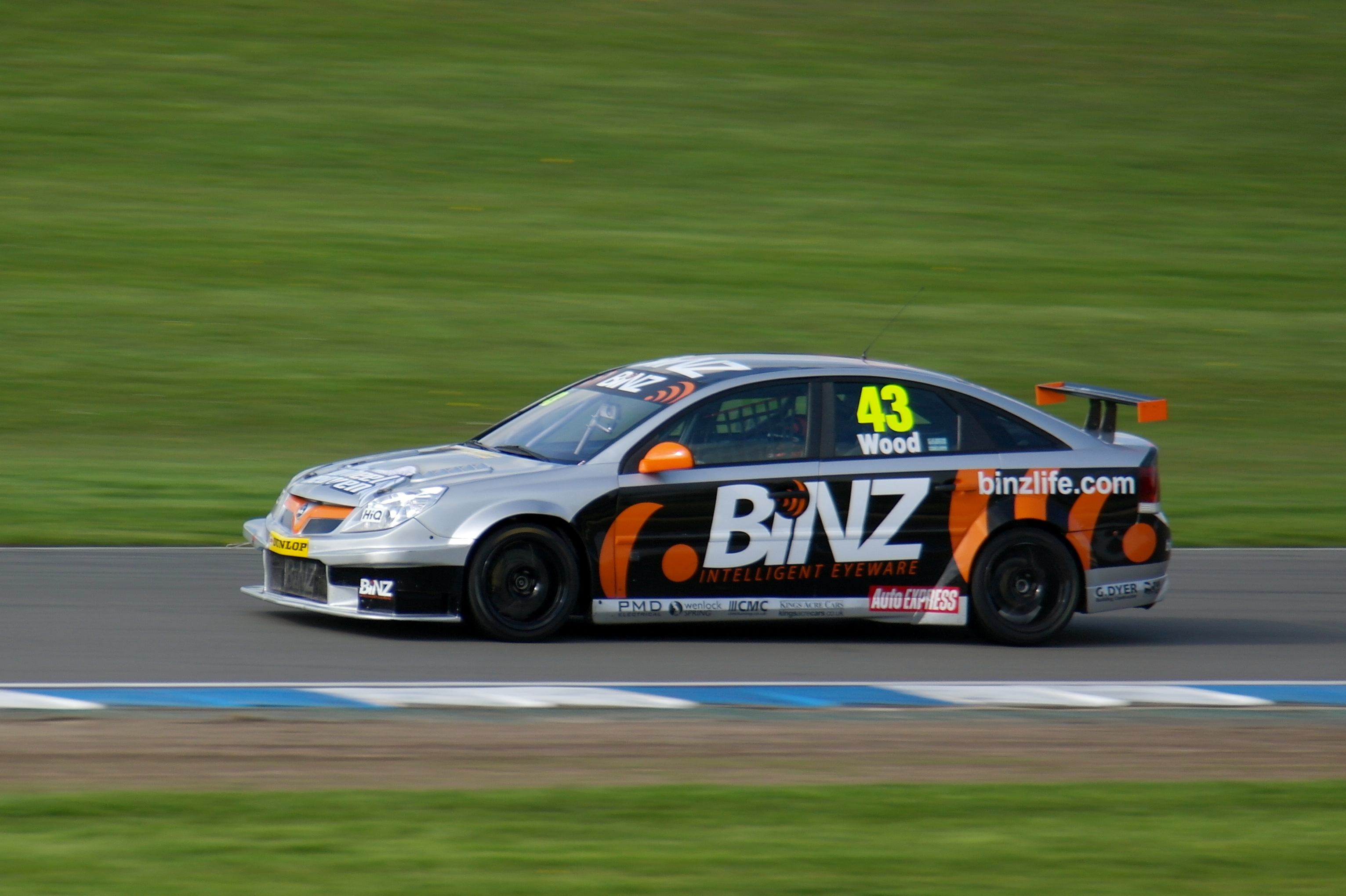
Wood driving for BINZ Racing at Donington Park in the 2012 BTCC season.

For 2010, Wood stepped up to the British Touring Car Championship in a BTC spec Honda Integra for his family run Team Wood Racing, competing under the Central Racing Group banner. He started at the third round of the championship at Brands Hatch and went on to race at all meeting except Knockhill. His best results all season were a pair of 11th places.

Wood continued with the Integra for 2011, although with an extra 50 kg of ballast applied to BTC Touring spec cars as TOCA phased them out of the championship. He started the season with the fourth round at Oulton Park, where he qualified 21st and finished 7th in race one to beat many newer and faster cars in the mixed conditions. This would turn out to be the time he scored points all season. His team elected to miss the round at Knockhill and he couldn't participate in the Rockingham meeting due to engine problems in his Honda Integra.

In 2012, Wood raced the ex-Pirtek Racing Vauxhall Vectra which Andrew Jordan drove in 2011, running to Super 2000 regulations. His team races under the BINZ Racing banner after gaining sponsorship from the eyewear company.

Throughout the 2013 BTCC Season, Wood took part in the Jack Sears Trophy for S2000 Spec cars with his Vauxhall Vectra, run alongside the modern current spec NGTC car. Lea won 18 out of 30 available trophies throughout the 2013 season. His closest rival was Liam Griffin in the Motorbase – Addison Lee Ford Focus. A handful of wins mid season including a second hat-trick at Rockingham, gave Wood an unassailable lead in the Jack Sears Championship. This made him the inaugural Jack Sears Trophy champion and was presented with his trophy by Jack Sears himself at the championship finale at Brands Hatch on 13 October 2013. The car as usual was run by the Team Wood Racing outfit under the name of Wheel Heaven/Houseman Racing, with support from DLRD Racing and CMC Tuning.

The 2014 BTCC Season saw Wood upgrade to an ex-Ciceley Racing Toyota Avensis. Wood's best result was 13th place at Donington Park.

For 2015, Wood moved into team management and driver coaching, running Stewart Lines in the Toyota Avensis.

=== British Pickup Truck Racing Championship ===
On 21 December 2015, Wood announced he would be switching from the BTCC to the British Pickup Truck Racing Championship. After a successful initial outing during 2015 in which he took a win and a podium first time out at Thruxton, Wood announced he would be contesting a full season in the series in 2016.

The 2016 season saw Wood finish second in the championship in his first full season driving a Ford Ranger.

For 2017, Wood again contested the Pickup Truck Championship, finishing third overall.

== Team Wood Racing ==
Team Wood Racing is the outfit which has run cars for Lea in various series for most of his racing career. They took the BRSCC Super Silhouette Championship title in 2007.

The team ran in the British Touring Car Championship in 2010 and 2011 under the Central Group Racing banner before becoming BINZ Racing in 2012.

== Racing record ==
=== Complete British Touring Car Championship results ===
(key) (Races in bold indicate pole position – 1 point awarded in first race) (Races in italics indicate fastest lap – 1 point awarded all races) (* signifies that driver lead race for at least one lap – 1 point awarded all races)

Year	Team	Car	1	2	3	4	5	6	7	8	9	10	11	12	13	14	15	16	17	18	19	20	21	22	23	24	25	26	27	28	29	30	DC	Pts
2010	Central Group Racing	Honda Integra	THR; 1	THR; 2	THR; 3	ROC; 1	ROC; 2	ROC; 3	BRH; 1; 13	BRH; 2 Ret	BRH; 3; 11	OUL; 1; 13	OUL; 2; 11	OUL; 3; 12	CRO; 1 Ret	CRO; 2; 17	CRO; 3; 13	SNE; 1; 14	SNE; 2; 14	SNE; 3 Ret	SIL; 1; 16	SIL; 2 Ret	SIL; 3 Ret	KNO; 1	KNO; 2	KNO; 3	DON; 1; 13	DON; 2; 17	DON; 3; 11	BRH; 1; 15	BRH; 2; 15	BRH; 3 Ret	24th	0
2011	Central Group Racing	Honda Integra	BRH; 1	BRH; 2	BRH; 3	DON; 1	DON; 2	DON; 3	THR; 1	THR; 2	THR; 3	OUL; 1; 7	OUL; 2; 11	OUL; 3; 15	CRO; 1; 16	CRO; 2; 15	CRO; 3; 19	SNE; 1 Ret	SNE; 2; 15	SNE; 3; 18	KNO; 1	KNO; 2	KNO; 3	ROC; 1 DNS	ROC; 2 DNS	ROC; 3 DNS	BRH; 1 Ret	BRH; 2; 21	BRH; 3 Ret	SIL; 1; 18	SIL; 2; 17	SIL; 3; 20	20th	4
2012	BINZ Racing	Vauxhall Vectra	BRH; 1; 11	BRH; 2; 15	BRH; 3; 9	DON; 1 Ret	DON; 2; 15	DON; 3; 10	THR; 1; 9	THR; 2; 12	THR; 3; 8	OUL; 1; 10	OUL; 2; 7	OUL; 3; 5	CRO; 1; 13	CRO; 2; 19	CRO; 3 Ret	SNE; 1; 9	SNE; 2; 9	**SNE**; **3** Ret*	KNO; 1 Ret	KNO; 2; 13	KNO; 3; 13	ROC; 1	ROC; 2	ROC; 3	SIL; 1; 9	SIL; 2; 16	SIL; 3; 15	BRH; 1; 11	BRH; 2; 9	BRH; 3; 9	14th	116
2013	Wheel Heaven/Houseman Racing	Vauxhall Vectra	BRH; 1; 16	BRH; 2 Ret	BRH; 3 DSQ	DON; 1; 24	DON; 2; 17	DON; 3 Ret	THR; 1; 21	THR; 2; 20	THR; 3; 16	OUL; 1; 19	OUL; 2; 18	OUL; 3 Ret	CRO; 1; 22	CRO; 2; 16	CRO; 3; 16	SNE; 1; 19	SNE; 2; 13	SNE; 3; 15	KNO; 1; 19	KNO; 2; 19	KNO; 3; 12	ROC; 1; 20	ROC; 2; 19	ROC; 3; 16	SIL; 1; 20	SIL; 2; 16	SIL; 3; 20	BRH; 1; 18	BRH; 2; 16	BRH; 3; 22	24th	8
2014	Houseman Racing	Toyota Avensis	BRH; 1; 22	BRH; 2 Ret	BRH; 3 Ret	DON; 1; 15	DON; 2; 17	DON; 3; 13	THR; 1; 18	THR; 2; 16	THR; 3; 17	OUL; 1; 22	OUL; 2; 17	OUL; 3; 19	CRO; 1; 18	CRO; 2; 16	CRO; 3; 14	SNE; 1; 21	SNE; 2; 19	SNE; 3; 19	KNO; 1; 23	KNO; 2 Ret	KNO; 3; 24	ROC; 1 Ret	ROC; 2 DNS	ROC; 3 DNS	SIL; 1 Ret	SIL; 2; 21	SIL; 3; 20	BRH; 1; 16	BRH; 2; 14	BRH; 3; 14	24th	10

^{*} Season still in progress.
