= Joe Girling =

British racing driver (born 1990)

- Nationality: British
- Born: 14 January 1990 (age 36)

British Touring Car Championship career
- Debut season: 2013
- Current team: M247 Racing with Tech-Speed Motorsport
- Car number: 90
- Starts: 27
- Championships: 0
- Wins: 0 (1 in class)
- Poles: 1
- Fastest laps: 0
- Best finish: 11th in 2013

Previous series
- 2011: Renault Clio Cup Trophy
- Statistics up to date as of 3 August 2013.

Joe Girling (born 14 January 1990) is a British racing driver who competed in the British Touring Car Championship in 2013 for Tech-Speed Motorsport, under the M247 Racing banner.

== Career ==
In 2011, Girling entered the Renault Clio Cup Trophy, a two-race event held at Rockingham. He finished fifth in the first race, and fourth in the second, driving a Stancombe Vehicle Engineering-entered car.

In March 2013, it was announced that Girling would be driving for Tech-Speed Motorsport in the British Touring Car Championship, driving a Super 2000-class Chevrolet Cruze. He made his début in the series at the opening round, held at Brands Hatch's Indy Circuit. He sat out the first two races due to a broken driveshaft, before finishing eighteenth overall in the third race of the day. At Donington Park, he took his first victory in the Jack Sears Trophy, following a series of retirements in the class, in the third race of the day. Thruxton proved to be less successful, with his best result being third in class in race one. He withdrew from the Oulton Park round of the series for medical reasons, and missed the races at Croft due to an accident in qualifying. He also missed the round at Snetterton. Prior to the Knockhill round he decided to take a sabbatical from the BTCC.

== Racing record ==
=== Complete British Touring Car Championship results ===
(key) (Races in bold indicate pole position – 1 point awarded just in first race) (Races in italics indicate fastest lap – 1 point awarded all races) (* signifies that driver lead race for at least one lap – 1 point given all races)

Year	Team	Car	1	2	3	4	5	6	7	8	9	10	11	12	13	14	15	16	17	18	19	20	21	22	23	24	25	26	27	28	29	30	Pos	Pts
2013	M247 Racing with Tech-Speed Motorsport	Chevrolet Cruze LT	BRH; 1 DNS	BRH; 2 DNS	BRH; 3; 18	DON; 1; 21	DON; 2 Ret	DON; 3; 18	THR; 1; 23	THR; 2 Ret	THR; 3; 20	OUL; 1	OUL; 2	OUL; 3	CRO; 1 DNS	CRO; 2 DNS	CRO; 3 DNS	SNE; 1	SNE; 2	SNE; 3	KNO; 1	KNO; 2	KNO; 3	ROC; 1	ROC; 2	ROC; 3	SIL; 1	SIL; 2	SIL; 3	BRH; 1	BRH; 2	BRH; 3	37th	0
