= Will Powell (racing driver) =

British racing driver (born 1985)

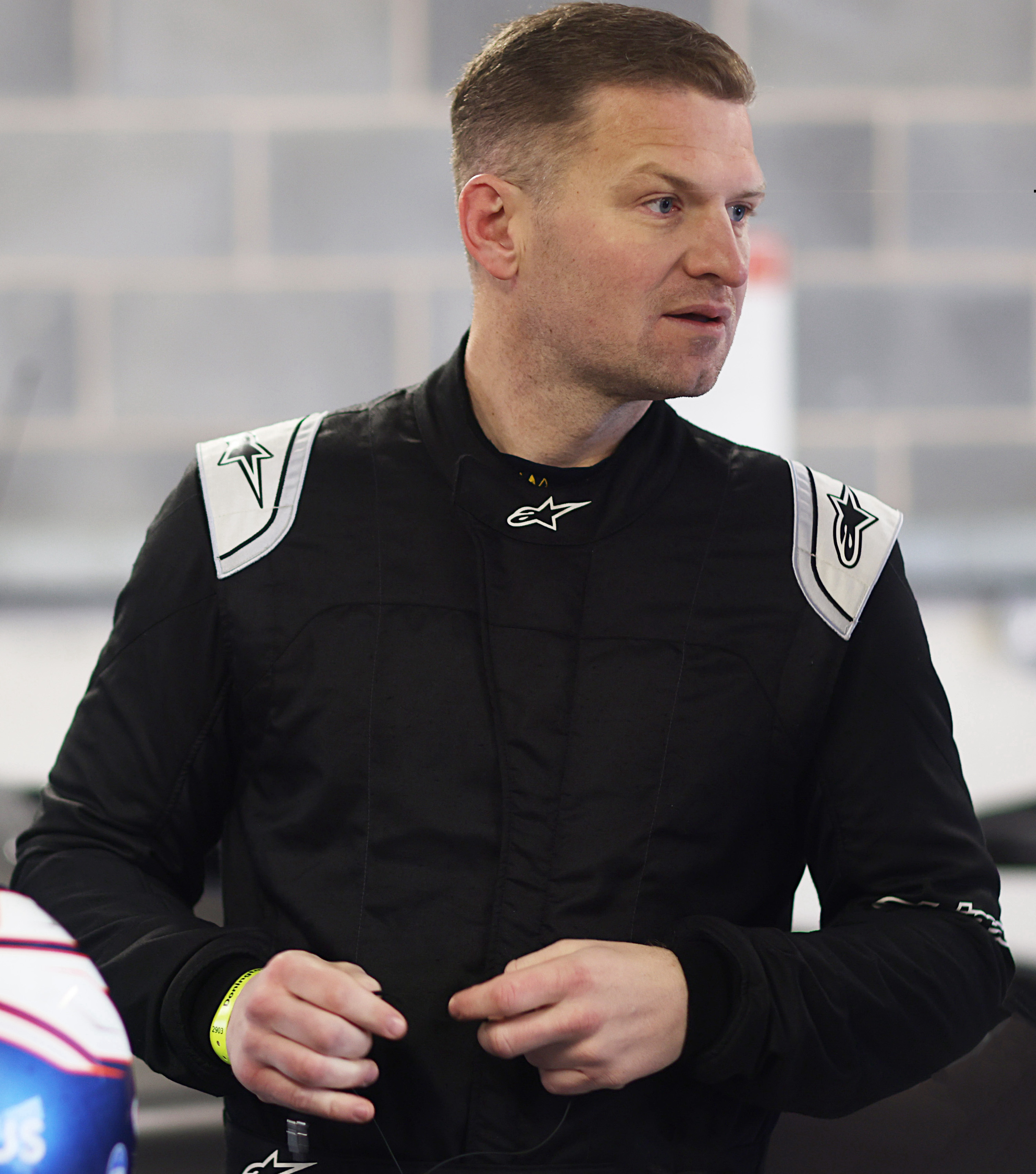
- Powell in 2021
- Nationality: (United Kingdom) British
- Born: William Powell; 8 March 1985 (age 41) Birmingham, West Midlands, England

British Touring Car Championship career
- Debut season: 2022
- Categorisation: FIA Silver
- Car number: 70
- Former teams: Autobrite Direct with JourneyHero; One Motorsport with Starline Racing
- Starts: 36 (36 entries)
- Wins: 0
- Poles: 0
- Fastest laps: 0
- Best finish: 17th in 2023

Previous series
- TCR UK; Britcar Endurance Championship; GT Cup Championship

William Powell (born 8 March 1985) is a British racing driver and businessman. He is the founder of Octane Sports and formerly the motorsport team Motus One .

Powell notably raced in the British Touring Car Championship for Starline Racing in 2023 and for Autobrite Direct with JourneyHero in 2022. He also raced as part of the Brabham Motorsport factory team and won the 2021 British Endurance Championship in a McLaren GT3.

== Business ==
Powell's career began working as a road tester for Autocar and Haymarket Media Group.

Powell later worked for production company North One TV with clients including FIA World Rally Championship, FIA Formula E Championship, and FIA Formula One.

Powell held performance vehicle marketing roles at Jaguar Land Rover and later became a Vice President at CSM, the sports marketing division of Chime Plc, through a business acquisition.

In 2016, Powell founded Motus One, a motorsport marketing business and race team. The race team was later acquired by BTC Racing, which rebranded to One Motorsport and named Powell as a driver, before a dispute led to his departure in July 2023.

== Motor racing ==
Powell was a BTCC driver for team Autobrite Direct with JourneyHero run by Team HARD in a Cupra Leon. He was formerly a factory driver for the motorsport division of Anglo-American sports car company Brabham Automotive.

Powell has raced in GT and sports car championships in the UK including F3,British Endurance Championship, GT Cup, Radicals, 24H Series and MR2 Championship.

Powell is qualified as a race coach by the Association of Racing Driver Schools (ARDS) and has coached customers for Mercedes-Benz AMG, Bentley, and Ford.

Powell drove the Brabham BT62 Competition in the marque’s return to racing at the Brands Hatch Into The Night Race in November 2019 alongside teammate David Brabham. The duo finished in first place with Powell setting fastest lap of the race.

In a disrupted 2020 motorsport season, Powell raced in the British Endurance Championship and GT Cup in a Ginetta G55 GT4 with co-driver Dave Scaramanga for Motus One Racing. During the COVID-19 UK lockdown, Powell won multiple e-sports races in a virtual Brabham BT62.

In 2021, Powell won the British Endurance Championship in a McLaren 650S GT3. In the same year, it was announced by Maximum Motorsport that Powell would drive its Hyundai i30N in the TCR UK touring car championship. He also tested for Team HARD in its Cupra Leon for the British Touring Car Championship.

Powell competed in six of the ten race weekends that made up the 2022 BTCC Championship in a CUPRA Leon as late replacement for Jack Goff. He also competed in a partial season of the British Endurance Championship and scored multiple podiums.

In 2023, Powell competed in five of the BTCC Championship weekends in a Honda Civic for One Motorsport Starline Racing and raced in Le Mans Cup in a Duqueine D-08 for Murphy Prototypes.

In 2024, it was announced that Powell would return to the TCR UK Championship before taking a break from motorsport to focus on business.

== Racing record ==
=== Complete British Touring Car Championship results ===
(key) (Races in bold indicate pole position – 1 point awarded just in first race; races in italics indicate fastest lap – 1 point awarded all races; * signifies that driver led race for at least one lap – 1 point given all races)

Year	Team	Car	1	2	3	4	5	6	7	8	9	10	11	12	13	14	15	16	17	18	19	20	21	22	23	24	25	26	27	28	29	30	DC	Points
2022	Autobrite Direct with JourneyHero	Cupra León	DON; 1	DON; 2	DON; 3	BRH; 1; 29	BRH; 2; 23	BRH; 3; 25	THR; 1; 23	THR; 2; 22	THR; 3 Ret	OUL; 1 Ret	OUL; 2 NC	OUL; 3; 21	CRO; 1 Ret	CRO; 2; 24	CRO; 3; 22	KNO; 1; 21	KNO; 2 Ret	KNO; 3; 26	SNE; 1; 25	SNE; 2 Ret	SNE; 3; 24	THR; 1	THR; 2	THR; 3	SIL; 1; 22	SIL; 2; 25	SIL; 3 Ret	BRH; 1	BRH; 2	BRH; 3	31st	0
2023	One Motorsport with Starline Racing	Honda Civic Type R	DON; 1; 18	DON; 2 Ret	DON; 3 Ret	BRH; 1; 22	BRH; 2; 21	BRH; 3; 18	SNE; 1; 22	SNE; 2; 23	SNE; 3; 19	THR; 1; 20	THR; 2 Ret	THR; 3; 24	OUL; 1; 19	OUL; 2 Ret	OUL; 3; 21	CRO; 1	CRO; 2	CRO; 3	KNO; 1	KNO; 2	KNO; 3	DON; 1	DON; 2	DON; 3	SIL; 1	SIL; 2	SIL; 3	BRH; 1	BRH; 2	BRH; 3	29th	0
