= 2022 British Touring Car Championship =

65th season of the British Touring Car Championship

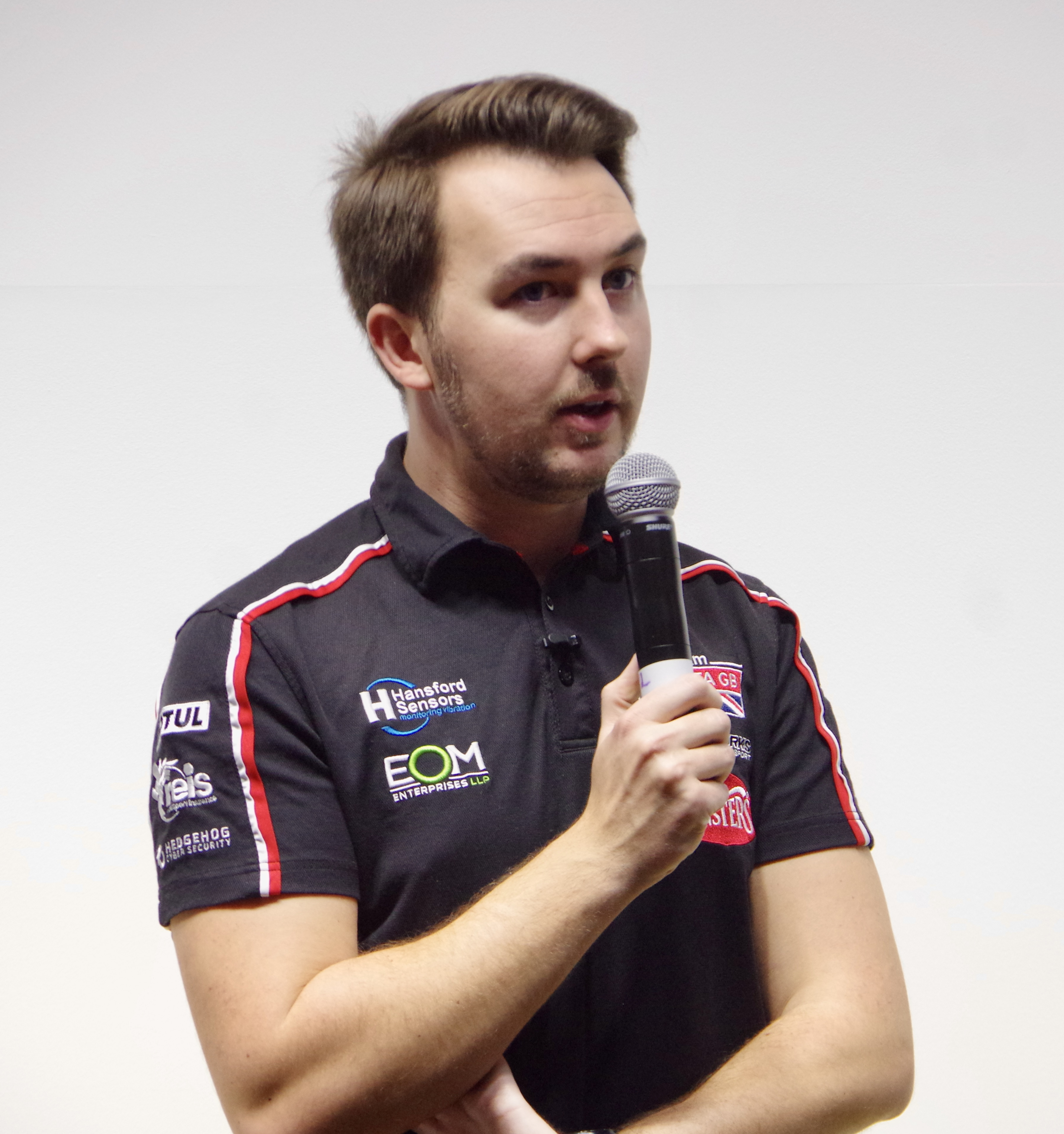
Tom Ingram won his first British Touring Car Championship

The 2022 Kwik Fit British Touring Car Championship (commonly abbreviated as BTCC) was a motor racing championship for production-based touring cars held across England and Scotland. The championship featured a mix of professional motor racing teams and privately funded amateur drivers competing in highly modified versions of family cars which are sold to the general public and conform to the technical regulations for the championship.

The 2022 season was the 65th British Touring Car Championship season and the twelfth season for cars conforming to the Next Generation Touring Car (NGTC) technical specification.

This was the first season of the championship's new Hybrid Energy Management (HEM) system, developed by Cosworth Electronics, which replaced the series' previous success ballast system.

Tom Ingram won the championship, his first championship in the BTCC.

== Teams and drivers ==
Team	Car	Engine	No.	Drivers	Rounds
Constructor Entries
NAPA Racing UK	Ford Focus ST	Ford/Mountune	1	(United Kingdom) Ashley Sutton	All
NAPA Racing UK	Ford Focus ST	Ford/Mountune	9	(United Kingdom) Dan Cammish	All
Apec Racing with Beavis Morgan	Ford Focus ST	Ford/Mountune	48	(United Kingdom) Ollie Jackson	All
Apec Racing with Beavis Morgan	Ford Focus ST	Ford/Mountune	77	(United Kingdom) Sam Osborne	All
Bristol Street Motors with Excelr8 TradePriceCars.com	Hyundai i30 Fastback N Performance	Hyundai/Swindon	3	(United Kingdom) Tom Chilton	All
Bristol Street Motors with Excelr8 TradePriceCars.com	Hyundai i30 Fastback N Performance	Hyundai/Swindon	18	(United Kingdom) James Gornall	5
Bristol Street Motors with Excelr8 TradePriceCars.com	Hyundai i30 Fastback N Performance	Hyundai/Swindon	80	(United Kingdom) Tom Ingram	All
Bristol Street Motors with Excelr8 TradePriceCars.com	Hyundai i30 Fastback N Performance	Hyundai/Swindon	96	(United Kingdom) Jack Butel	1–4, 6–10
Bristol Street Motors with Excelr8 TradePriceCars.com	Hyundai i30 Fastback N Performance	Hyundai/Swindon	123	(United Kingdom) Daniel Lloyd	All
Toyota Gazoo Racing UK	Toyota Corolla GR Sport	TOCA/M-Sport	6	(United Kingdom) Rory Butcher	All
Toyota Gazoo Racing UK	Toyota Corolla GR Sport	TOCA/M-Sport	21	(United Kingdom) Ricky Collard	All
Team BMW	BMW 330e M Sport	BMW/Neil Brown	12	(United Kingdom) Stephen Jelley	All
Team BMW	BMW 330e M Sport	BMW/Neil Brown	50	(United Kingdom) Colin Turkington	All
ROKiT MB Motorsport	BMW 330e M Sport	BMW/Neil Brown	24	(United Kingdom) Jake Hill	All
Halfords Racing with Cataclean	Honda Civic Type R	Honda/Neil Brown	32	(United Kingdom) Daniel Rowbottom	All
Halfords Racing with Cataclean	Honda Civic Type R	Honda/Neil Brown	52	(United Kingdom) Gordon Shedden	All
Independent Entries
Rich Energy BTC Racing	Honda Civic Type R	TOCA/M-Sport	11	(United Kingdom) Jason Plato	All
Rich Energy BTC Racing	Honda Civic Type R	TOCA/M-Sport	66	(United Kingdom) Josh Cook	All
Rich Energy BTC Racing	Honda Civic Type R	TOCA/M-Sport	99	(United Kingdom) Jade Edwards	All
Laser Tools Racing	Infiniti Q50	TOCA/M-Sport	16	(United Kingdom) Aiden Moffat	All
Laser Tools Racing	Infiniti Q50	TOCA/M-Sport	17	(United Kingdom) Dexter Patterson	All
UptonSteel with Euro Car Parts Racing	Infiniti Q50	TOCA/M-Sport	62	(United Kingdom) Rick Parfitt Jr.	1–4, 6–10
UptonSteel with Euro Car Parts Racing	Infiniti Q50	TOCA/M-Sport	41	(United Kingdom) Carl Boardley	5
Autobrite Direct with JourneyHero	Cupra León	TOCA/M-Sport	41	(United Kingdom) Carl Boardley	10
Autobrite Direct with JourneyHero	Cupra León	TOCA/M-Sport	15	(United Kingdom) Tom Oliphant	8
Autobrite Direct with JourneyHero	Cupra León	TOCA/M-Sport	19	(United Kingdom) Bobby Thompson	All
Autobrite Direct with JourneyHero	Cupra León	TOCA/M-Sport	20	(United Kingdom) Will Powell	2–7, 9
Yazoo with Safuu.com Racing	Cupra León	TOCA/M-Sport	28	(United Kingdom) Nicolas Hamilton	All
Yazoo with Safuu.com Racing	Cupra León	TOCA/M-Sport	40	(Republic of Ireland) Árón Taylor-Smith	All
Car Gods with Ciceley Motorsport	BMW 330e M Sport	BMW/Neil Brown	33	(United Kingdom) Adam Morgan	All
Car Gods with Ciceley Motorsport	BMW 330e M Sport	BMW/Neil Brown	42	(United Kingdom) George Gamble	All
CarStore Power Maxed Racing	Vauxhall Astra	TOCA/M-Sport	97	(United Kingdom) Ash Hand	All
CarStore Power Maxed Racing	Vauxhall Astra	TOCA/M-Sport	777	(United Kingdom) Michael Crees	All

Key
Eligible for the Jack Sears Trophy for drivers yet to record an overall
podium finish or Jack Sears Trophy championship at the start of the season.
Entry List

=== Driver changes ===
Entering/re-entering BTCC

- Dexter Patterson debuted with Laser Tools Racing.
- George Gamble debuted with Car Gods with Ciceley Motorsport.
- 2020 Jack Sears Trophy winner Michael Crees returned to the series after he split with BTC Racing at the start of last season, driving a first car for Power Maxed Racing to replace Dan Lloyd.
- 2017 VW Racing Cup winner Bobby Thompson returned to the series and Team HARD after having last raced in 2020 for GKR TradePriceCars.com.
- Rob Collard's son Ricky Collard returned to the series after having last raced in 2018 for Team BMW, driving a second car for Toyota Gazoo Racing UK to replace Sam Smelt.
- 2019 British GT4 Championship winner Ash Hand debuted with Power Maxed Racing.
- 2021 Britcar Endurance Championship winner Will Powell debuted with Autobrite Direct with JourneyHero to replace Jack Goff.

Changed teams

- Dan Cammish will move from BTC Racing to Motorbase Performance, driving for the "NAPA Racing UK" branded team.
- Reigning Champion Ashley Sutton will move from Laser Tools Racing to Motorbase Performance, racing for the "NAPA Racing UK" brand.
- Dan Lloyd will move from Adrian Flux with Power Maxed Racing to Excelr8 Motorsport.
- Tom Chilton will move from Car Gods with Ciceley Motorsport to Excelr8 Motorsport.
- Rick Parfitt Jr. will move from Excelr8 with TradePriceCars.com to Team HARD.
- Jason Plato will move from Adrian Flux with Power Maxed Racing to BTC Racing.

Leaving BTCC

- Tom Oliphant will take a sabbatical from the series.
- Andy Neate retired from the series in order to focus on his son's racing career.
- Senna Proctor will take a sabbatical from the series.
- Chris Smiley will leave the series and join the 2022 TCR UK Touring Car Championship.
- Jack Mitchell will leave the series and rejoin the 2022 British GT Championship.
- Sam Smelt will take a sabbatical from the series.
- Carl Boardley will retire from the series.
- Jack Goff was set for his fourth season with Tony Gilham Racing, but withdrew before the season began.

=== Team changes ===
- MB Motorsport will move from Motorbase Performance to West Surrey Racing.
- Motorbase Performance, will enter 2 cars under the commercial name of NAPA Racing UK following its sponsorship by the European division of Genuine Parts Company.
- Excelr8 Motorsport will use Hyundai engines tuned by Swindon Powertrain.
- Excelr8 Motorsport and Team Dynamics will enter the Manufacturers'/Constructors' Championship as constructors.

== Race calendar ==
The championship calendar was announced by the championship organisers on 30 June 2021.

2022 BTCC Race Locations

Round		Circuit	Date
1	R1	Donington Park (National Circuit, Leicestershire)	23–24 April
1	R2	Donington Park (National Circuit, Leicestershire)	23–24 April
1	R3	Donington Park (National Circuit, Leicestershire)	23–24 April
2	R4	Brands Hatch (Indy Circuit, Kent)	14–15 May
2	R5	Brands Hatch (Indy Circuit, Kent)	14–15 May
2	R6	Brands Hatch (Indy Circuit, Kent)	14–15 May
3	R7	Thruxton Circuit (Hampshire)	28–29 May
3	R8	Thruxton Circuit (Hampshire)	28–29 May
3	R9	Thruxton Circuit (Hampshire)	28–29 May
4	R10	Oulton Park (Island Circuit, Cheshire)	11–12 June
4	R11	Oulton Park (Island Circuit, Cheshire)	11–12 June
4	R12	Oulton Park (Island Circuit, Cheshire)	11–12 June
5	R13	Croft Circuit (North Yorkshire)	25–26 June
5	R14	Croft Circuit (North Yorkshire)	25–26 June
5	R15	Croft Circuit (North Yorkshire)	25–26 June
6	R16	Knockhill Racing Circuit (Fife)	30–31 July
6	R17	Knockhill Racing Circuit (Fife)	30–31 July
6	R18	Knockhill Racing Circuit (Fife)	30–31 July
7	R19	Snetterton Motor Racing Circuit (300 Circuit, Norfolk)	13–14 August
7	R20	Snetterton Motor Racing Circuit (300 Circuit, Norfolk)	13–14 August
7	R21	Snetterton Motor Racing Circuit (300 Circuit, Norfolk)	13–14 August
8	R22	Thruxton Circuit (Hampshire)	27–28 August
8	R23	Thruxton Circuit (Hampshire)	27–28 August
8	R24	Thruxton Circuit (Hampshire)	27–28 August
9	R25	Silverstone Circuit (National Circuit, Northamptonshire)	24–25 September
9	R26	Silverstone Circuit (National Circuit, Northamptonshire)	24–25 September
9	R27	Silverstone Circuit (National Circuit, Northamptonshire)	24–25 September
10	R28	Brands Hatch (Grand Prix Circuit, Kent)	8–9 October
10	R29	Brands Hatch (Grand Prix Circuit, Kent)	8–9 October
10	R30	Brands Hatch (Grand Prix Circuit, Kent)	8–9 October

== Results and standings ==
All drivers raced under British licenses, except Árón Taylor-Smith, who raced with an Irish license.

Round		Circuit	Pole position	Fastest lap	Winning driver	Winning team	Winning independent	Winning JST
1	R1	Donington Park	Jake Hill	Tom Ingram	Tom Ingram	Bristol Street Motors with Excelr8 TradePriceCars.com	Adam Morgan	George Gamble
1	R2	Donington Park		Gordon Shedden	Gordon Shedden	Halfords Racing with Cataclean	George Gamble	George Gamble
1	R3	Donington Park		Jake Hill	Jake Hill	ROKiT MB Motorsport	Josh Cook	Bobby Thompson
2	R1	Brands Hatch Indy	Colin Turkington	Rory Butcher	Josh Cook	Rich Energy BTC Racing	Josh Cook	Ash Hand
2	R2	Brands Hatch Indy		Ashley Sutton	Josh Cook	Rich Energy BTC Racing	Josh Cook	George Gamble
2	R3	Brands Hatch Indy		Colin Turkington	Colin Turkington	Team BMW	Bobby Thompson	Bobby Thompson
3	R1	Thruxton Circuit	Josh Cook	Daniel Rowbottom	Josh Cook	Rich Energy BTC Racing	Josh Cook	Ash Hand
3	R2	Thruxton Circuit		Josh Cook	Josh Cook	Rich Energy BTC Racing	Josh Cook	Ash Hand
3	R3	Thruxton Circuit		Tom Ingram	Adam Morgan	Car Gods with Ciceley Motorsport	Adam Morgan	Ash Hand
4	R1	Oulton Park	Tom Ingram	Daniel Lloyd	Tom Ingram	Bristol Street Motors with Excelr8 TradePriceCars.com	Josh Cook	Bobby Thompson
4	R2	Oulton Park		Ashley Sutton	Tom Ingram	Bristol Street Motors with Excelr8 TradePriceCars.com	Josh Cook	Bobby Thompson
4	R3	Oulton Park		Jake Hill	Stephen Jelley	Team BMW	Aiden Moffat	Ash Hand
5	R1	Croft Circuit	Colin Turkington	Tom Ingram	Daniel Lloyd	Bristol Street Motors with Excelr8 TradePriceCars.com	Aiden Moffat	George Gamble
5	R2	Croft Circuit		Tom Ingram	Daniel Lloyd	Bristol Street Motors with Excelr8 TradePriceCars.com	Aiden Moffat	Bobby Thompson
5	R3	Croft Circuit		Gordon Shedden	Gordon Shedden	Halfords Racing with Cataclean	Josh Cook	Bobby Thompson
6	R1	Knockhill Racing Circuit	Jake Hill	Jake Hill	Jake Hill	ROKiT MB Motorsport	George Gamble	George Gamble
6	R2	Knockhill Racing Circuit		Colin Turkington	Ashley Sutton	NAPA Racing UK	George Gamble	George Gamble
6	R3	Knockhill Racing Circuit		Jake Hill	George Gamble	Car Gods with Ciceley Motorsport	George Gamble	George Gamble
7	R1	Snetterton Motor Racing Circuit	Colin Turkington	Colin Turkington	Colin Turkington	Team BMW	Adam Morgan	Ash Hand
7	R2	Snetterton Motor Racing Circuit		Colin Turkington	Colin Turkington	Team BMW	Adam Morgan	Ash Hand
7	R3	Snetterton Motor Racing Circuit		Ashley Sutton	Ashley Sutton	NAPA Racing UK	Jason Plato	George Gamble
8	R1	Thruxton Circuit	Dan Cammish	Gordon Shedden	Dan Cammish	NAPA Racing UK	Ash Hand	Ash Hand
8	R2	Thruxton Circuit		Ashley Sutton	Ashley Sutton	NAPA Racing UK	Josh Cook	Bobby Thompson
8	R3	Thruxton Circuit		Josh Cook	Josh Cook	Rich Energy BTC Racing	Josh Cook	Jack Butel
9	R1	Silverstone Circuit	Rory Butcher	Tom Ingram	Rory Butcher	Toyota Gazoo Racing UK	Adam Morgan	Bobby Thompson
9	R2	Silverstone Circuit		Tom Ingram	Jake Hill	ROKiT MB Motorsport	Adam Morgan	Bobby Thompson
9	R3	Silverstone Circuit		Jake Hill	Tom Ingram	Bristol Street Motors with Excelr8 TradePriceCars.com	Josh Cook	Bobby Thompson
10	R1	Brands Hatch GP	Tom Ingram	Tom Ingram	Tom Ingram	Bristol Street Motors with Excelr8 TradePriceCars.com	Adam Morgan	Bobby Thompson
10	R2	Brands Hatch GP		Tom Ingram	Tom Ingram	Bristol Street Motors with Excelr8 TradePriceCars.com	Adam Morgan	Bobby Thompson
10	R3	Brands Hatch GP		Josh Cook	Daniel Lloyd	Bristol Street Motors with Excelr8 TradePriceCars.com	Josh Cook	George Gamble

=== Drivers' Championship ===
Points system
1st	2nd	3rd	4th	5th	6th	7th	8th	9th	10th	11th	12th	13th	14th	15th	R1 PP	Fastest lap	Lead laps in race
20	17	15	13	11	10	9	8	7	6	5	4	3	2	1	1	1	1

Notes

- The point for leading laps in race is one point, regardless of how many laps led.

Pos.	Driver	DON			BHI			THR1			OUL			CRO			KNO			SNE			THR2			SIL			BHGP			Pts
1	(United Kingdom) Tom Ingram	1^{FL}	2^{L}	5	2	5	4	21	8	6^{F}	1^{PL}	1^{L}	17	4^{F}	2^{F}	7	6	4	12	3	3	3	9	6	7	5^{F}	5^{F}	1^{L}	1^{PFL}	1^{FL}	5	394
2	(United Kingdom) Ashley Sutton	4	6	2	9	4^{F}	6	3	3	3	2	2^{F}	16	6	6	NC	2^{L}	1^{L}	5	9	9	1^{FL}	3	1^{FL}	5	6	4	2	4	5	4	382
3	(United Kingdom) Jake Hill	EX^{P}	9	1^{FL}	4	7	2	2	2	20	13	7	13^{F}	5	4	5	1^{PFL}	2^{L}	2^{F}	2	2	5	4	4	12	2	1^{L}	4^{F}	3	2	7	381
4	(United Kingdom) Colin Turkington	2^{L}	14	8	5^{PL}	10	1^{FL}	4	4	2	4	3	Ret	2^{P}	3	6	3	3^{F}	4	1^{PFL}	1^{FL}	6	10	10	2	NC	13	12	5	3	12	348
5	(United Kingdom) Rory Butcher	Ret	10	7	7^{F}	3	5	11	13	10	3	4	5	7	7	3	8	6	3	15	12	7	6	5	4	1^{PL}	2^{L}	3	2	4	3	318
6	(United Kingdom) Josh Cook	8	5	3	1^{L}	1^{L}	8	1^{PL}	1^{FL}	5	8	9	3	15	11	2	15	13	8	20	15	11	13	8	1^{FL}	13	8	6	11	7	2^{F}	296
7	(United Kingdom) Gordon Shedden	3	1^{FL}	9	8	6	11	24	11	Ret	6	5	4	Ret	12	1^{FL}	7	5	6	10	Ret	15	2^{FL}	3	9	4	3	8	Ret	19	13	248
8	(United Kingdom) Dan Cammish	16	21	13	3	2	10	25	18	19	5	6	6	13	13	8	9	9	Ret	7	18	16	1^{PL}	2^{L}	10	7	7	5	9	8	8	207
9	(United Kingdom) Adam Morgan	5	4	6	6	DNS	14	7	6	1^{L}	Ret	16	8	19	15	10	14	18	11	4	4	8	12	14	Ret	3	6	Ret	6	6	Ret	193
10	(United Kingdom) Daniel Lloyd	11	8	4	15	8	9	8	9	7	7^{F}	8	Ret	1^{L}	1^{L}	11	19	22	18	12	11	12	17	13	11	12	15	11	13	10	1^{L}	192
11	(United Kingdom) Stephen Jelley	7	Ret	14	20	18	13	9	14	16	11	12	1^{L}	11	10	4	4	8	7	5	5	21	11	11	3^{L}	9	14	13	10	15	9	181
12	(United Kingdom) Daniel Rowbottom	9	12	Ret	10	Ret	22	5^{F}	5	4	9	26	12	3	5	Ret	28	15	13	8	8	10	7	7	6	18	18	18	12	13	Ret	151
13	(United Kingdom) George Gamble	6	3	20	14	9	7	14	20	14	18	18	Ret	9	Ret	19	5	7	1^{L}	16	14	13	Ret	19	Ret	24	20	16	8	11	6	123
14	(United Kingdom) Bobby Thompson	12	7	10	16	11	3	17	16	12	15	14	Ret	12	14	12	12	Ret	20	14	17	14	15	12	23	11	9	14	7	9	Ret	99
15	(United Kingdom) Tom Chilton	10	22	Ret	13	12	Ret^{L}	12	15	11	Ret	Ret	20	10	9	9	11	10	9	Ret	DNS	DNS	28	22	16	10	12	7	16	14	18	83
16	(United Kingdom) Ricky Collard	Ret	Ret	15	26	17	20	16	17	18	10	10	7	24	25	18	10	11	15	11	6	4	22	15	13	8	Ret	Ret	14	16	11	81
17	(United Kingdom) Jason Plato	20	13	12	17	13	Ret	6	7	24	17	17	11	17	16	14	27	26	19	6	7	2	14	18	Ret	14	17	15	17	18	17	77
18	(United Kingdom) Aiden Moffat	15	16	26	22	24	15	15	25	17	12	11	2	8	8	Ret	13	12	10	Ret	Ret	17	16	16	Ret	Ret	16	Ret	15	12	10	69
19	(United Kingdom) Ash Hand	18	17	23	11	Ret	21	10	10	9	Ret	22	9	18	17	13	25	Ret	17	13	10	Ret	5	Ret	17	Ret	21	Ret	18	17	15	55
20	(United Kingdom) Michael Crees	14	15	16	12	Ret	DNS	13	12	8	14	13	Ret	16	Ret	Ret	26	19	16	Ret	21	18	8	9	8	16	19	20	20	21	Ret	50
21	(Republic of Ireland) Árón Taylor-Smith	13	11	11	21	16	16	18	19	13	16	15	10	Ret	21	Ret	16	16	14	17	16	22	19	25	18	15	10	10	Ret	Ret	20	38
22	(United Kingdom) Ollie Jackson	Ret	Ret	19	23	14	12	Ret	NC	21	20	24	14	Ret	20	15	23	21	21	18	13	9	18	17	14	19	11	9	Ret	23	22	33
23	(United Kingdom) Dexter Patterson	17	18	18	25	Ret	23	20	Ret	Ret	23	20	15	20	18	16	20	14	Ret	21	Ret	19	21	Ret	19	Ret	Ret	17	Ret	20	14	5
24	(United Kingdom) James Gornall													14	Ret	17																2
25	(United Kingdom) Sam Osborne	23	20	17	24	20	18	19	23	15	19	21	Ret	21	19	20	17	17	23	19	20	20	23	20	Ret	20	23	21	Ret	22	16	1
26	(United Kingdom) Jade Edwards	22	19	22	18	15	17	Ret	21	Ret	21	19	18	22	23	NC	22	20	24	Ret	22	23	25	23	21	17	24	23	22	25	21	1
27	(United Kingdom) Jack Butel	Ret	Ret	21	19	19	19	Ret	DNS	23	24	23	19				Ret	23	22	22	19	Ret	20	21	15	Ret	22	19	19	24	19	1
28	(United Kingdom) Rick Parfitt Jr.	21	Ret	25	28	22	Ret	22	Ret	22	25	25	Ret				18	25	25	23	Ret	DNS	27	26	22	21	26	22	Ret	26	Ret	0
29	(United Kingdom) Nicolas Hamilton	19	23	24	27	21	24	26	24	Ret	22	27	22	23	22	21	24	24	Ret	24	23	Ret	26	Ret	Ret	23	Ret	Ret	21	Ret	Ret	0
30	(United Kingdom) Tom Oliphant																						24	24	20							0
31	(United Kingdom) Will Powell				29	23	25	23	22	Ret	Ret	NC	21	Ret	24	22	21	Ret	26	25	Ret	24				22	25	Ret				0
–	(United Kingdom) Carl Boardley													WD	WD	WD													Ret	Ret	Ret	0
Pos.	Driver	DON			BHI			THR1			OUL			CRO			KNO			SNE			THR2			SIL			BHGP			Pts

Colour	Result
Gold	Winner
Silver	2nd place
Bronze	3rd place
Green	Points finish
Blue	Non-points finish
Blue	Non-classified finish (NC)
Purple	Retired (Ret)
Red	Did not qualify (DNQ)
Red	Did not pre-qualify (DNPQ)
Black	Disqualified (DSQ)
White	Did not start (DNS)
White	Withdrew (WD)
White	Race cancelled (C)
Blank	Did not participate (DNP)
Blank	Excluded (EX)

^{P} – Pole position

^{F} – Fastest lap
^{L} – Lead race lap

=== Manufacturers'/Constructors' Championship ===
Pos	Manufacturer/Constructor	DON			BHI			THR1			OUL			CRO			KNO			SNE			THR2			SIL			BHGP			Pts
1	BMW / West Surrey Racing	2	9	1	4	7	1	2	2	2	4	3	13	2	3	5	1	2	2	1	1	5	4	4	2	2	1	4	3	2	7	798
1	BMW / West Surrey Racing	EX	14	8	5	10	2	4	4	20	13	7	Ret	5	4	6	3	3	4	2	2	6	10	10	12	NC	13	12	5	3	12	798
2	Ford / Motorbase Performance	4	6	2	3	2	6	3	3	3	2	2	6	6	6	8	2	1	5	7	9	1	1	1	5	6	4	2	4	5	4	717
2	Ford / Motorbase Performance	16	21	13	9	4	10	25	18	19	5	6	16	13	13	NC	9	9	Ret	9	18	16	3	2	10	7	7	5	9	8	8	717
3	Hyundai / Excelr8 Motorsport	1	2	4	2	5	4	8	8	6	1	1	17	1	1	7	6	4	9	3	3	3	9	6	7	5	5	1	1	1	1	644
3	Hyundai / Excelr8 Motorsport	11	8	5	15	8	9	21	9	7	7	8	Ret	4	2	11	19	22	18	12	11	12	17	13	11	12	15	11	13	10	5	644
4	Honda / Team Dynamics	3	1	9	8	6	11	5	5	4	6	5	4	3	5	1	7	5	6	8	8	10	2	3	6	4	3	8	12	13	13	543
4	Honda / Team Dynamics	9	12	Ret	10	Ret	22	24	11	Ret	9	26	12	Ret	12	Ret	28	15	13	10	Ret	15	7	7	9	18	18	18	Ret	19	Ret	543
5	Toyota / Speedworks Motorsport	Ret	10	7	5	3	5	11	13	10	3	4	5	7	7	3	8	6	3	11	6	4	6	5	4	1	2	3	2	4	3	483
5	Toyota / Speedworks Motorsport	Ret	Ret	15	26	17	20	16	17	18	10	10	7	24	25	18	10	11	15	15	12	7	22	13	15	8	Ret	Ret	14	16	11	483
Pos	Manufacturer/Constructor	DON			BHI			THR1			OUL			CRO			KNO			SNE			THR2			SIL			BHGP			Pts

=== Teams' Championship ===
Pos	Team	DON			BHI			THR1			OUL			CRO			KNO			SNE			THR2			SIL			BHGP			Pts
1	NAPA Racing UK	4	6	2	3	2	6	3	3	3	2	2	6	6	6	8	2	1	5	7	9	1	1	1	5	6	4	2	4	5	4	582
1	NAPA Racing UK	16	21	13	9	4	10	25	18	19	5	6	16	13	13	NC	9	9	Ret	9	18	16	3	2	10	7	7	5	9	8	8	582
2	Team BMW	2	14	8	5	10	1	4	4	2	4	3	1	2	3	4	3	3	4	1	1	6	10	10	2	9	13	12	5	3	9	525
2	Team BMW	7	DNS	14	20	18	13	9	14	16	11	12	Ret	11	10	6	4	8	7	5	5	21	11	11	3	NC	14	13	10	15	12	525
3	Bristol Street Motors with Excelr8 TradePriceCars.com	1	2	4	2	5	4	8	8	6	1	1	17	1	1	7	6	4	9	3	3	3	9	6	7	5	5	1	1	1	1	497
3	Bristol Street Motors with Excelr8 TradePriceCars.com	10	8	5	13	8	9	12	9	7	7	8	20	4	2	9	11	10	12	12	11	12	17	13	11	10	12	7	13	10	5	497
4	Halfords Racing with Cataclean	3	1	9	8	6	11	5	5	4	6	5	4	3	5	1	7	5	6	8	8	10	2	3	6	4	3	8	12	13	13	388
4	Halfords Racing with Cataclean	9	12	Ret	10	Ret	22	24	11	Ret	9	26	12	Ret	12	Ret	28	15	13	10	Ret	15	7	7	9	18	18	18	Ret	19	Ret	388
5	ROKiT MB Motorsport	EX	9	1	4	7	2	2	2	20	13	7	13	5	4	5	1	2	2	2	2	5	4	4	12	2	1	4	3	2	7	371
6	Rich Energy BTC Racing	8	5	3	1	1	8	1	1	5	8	9	3	15	11	2	15	13	8	6	7	2	13	8	1	13	8	6	11	7	2	366
6	Rich Energy BTC Racing	20	13	12	15	13	Ret	6	7	24	17	17	11	17	16	14	27	26	19	20	15	11	14	18	Ret	14	17	15	17	18	17	366
7	Car Gods with Ciceley Motorsport	5	3	6	6	9	7	7	6	1	18	16	8	9	15	10	5	7	1	4	4	8	12	14	Ret	3	6	16	6	6	6	324
7	Car Gods with Ciceley Motorsport	6	4	20	14	DNS	14	14	20	14	Ret	18	Ret	19	Ret	19	14	18	11	16	14	13	Ret	19	Ret	24	20	Ret	8	11	Ret	324
8	Toyota Gazoo Racing UK	Ret	10	7	5	3	5	11	13	10	3	4	5	7	7	3	8	6	3	11	6	4	6	5	4	1	2	3	2	4	3	302
8	Toyota Gazoo Racing UK	Ret	Ret	15	26	17	20	16	17	18	10	10	7	24	25	18	10	11	15	15	12	7	22	13	15	8	Ret	Ret	14	16	11	302
9	Autobrite Direct with JourneyHero	12	7	10	16	11	3	17	16	12	15	14	21	12	14	12	12	Ret	20	14	17	14	15	12	20	11	9	14	7	9	Ret	110
9	Autobrite Direct with JourneyHero				29	23	25	23	22	Ret	Ret	NC	Ret	Ret	24	22	21	Ret	26	25	Ret	24	24	24	23	22	25	Ret	Ret	DNS	Ret	110
10	Laser Tools Racing	15	16	18	22	24	15	15	25	17	12	11	2	8	8	16	13	12	10	21	Ret	17	16	16	19	Ret	16	17	15	12	10	74
10	Laser Tools Racing	17	18	26	25	Ret	23	20	Ret	Ret	23	20	15	20	18	Ret	20	14	Ret	Ret	Ret	19	21	Ret	Ret	Ret	Ret	Ret	Ret	20	14	74
11	CarStore Power Maxed Racing	14	15	16	11	Ret	21	10	10	8	14	13	9	16	17	13	25	19	16	13	10	18	5	9	8	16	19	20	18	17	15	53
11	CarStore Power Maxed Racing	18	17	23	12	Ret	DNS	13	12	9	Ret	22	Ret	18	Ret	Ret	26	Ret	17	Ret	21	Ret	8	Ret	17	Ret	21	Ret	20	21	Ret	53
12	Yazoo with Safuu.com Racing	13	11	11	21	16	16	18	19	13	16	15	10	23	21	21	16	16	14	17	16	22	19	25	18	15	10	10	21	Ret	20	48
12	Yazoo with Safuu.com Racing	19	23	24	27	21	24	26	24	Ret	22	27	22	Ret	22	Ret	24	24	Ret	24	23	Ret	26	Ret	Ret	23	Ret	Ret	Ret	Ret	Ret	48
13	Apec Racing with Beavis Morgan	23	20	17	23	14	12	19	23	15	19	21	14	21	19	15	17	17	21	18	13	9	18	17	14	19	11	9	Ret	22	16	40
13	Apec Racing with Beavis Morgan	Ret	Ret	19	24	20	18	Ret	NC	21	20	24	Ret	Ret	20	20	23	21	23	19	20	20	23	20	Ret	20	23	21	Ret	23	22	40
14	UptonSteel with Euro Car Parts Racing	21	DNS	25	28	22	Ret	22	Ret	22	25	25	Ret	WD	WD	WD	18	25	25	23	Ret	DNS	27	26	22	21	26	22	Ret	26	Ret	0
Pos	Team	DON			BHI			THR1			OUL			CRO			KNO			SNE			THR2			SIL			BHGP			Pts

=== Independents' Trophy ===
Pos.	Driver	DON			BHI			THR1			OUL			CRO			KNO			SNE			THR2			SIL			BHGP			Pts
1	(United Kingdom) Josh Cook	8	5	3	1	1	8	1	1	5	8	9	3	15	11	2	15	13	8	20	15	11	13	8	1	13	8	6	11	7	2	502
2	(United Kingdom) Adam Morgan	5	4	6	6	DNS	14	7	6	1	Ret	16	8	19	15	10	14	18	11	4	4	8	12	14	Ret	3	6	Ret	6	6	Ret	400
3	(United Kingdom) Bobby Thompson	12	7	10	16	11	3	17	16	12	15	14	Ret	12	14	12	12	Ret	20	14	17	14	15	12	23	11	9	14	7	9	Ret	354
4	(United Kingdom) George Gamble	6	3	20	14	9	7	14	20	14	18	18	Ret	9	Ret	19	5	7	1	16	14	13	Ret	19	Ret	24	20	16	8	11	6	335
5	(United Kingdom) Jason Plato	20	13	12	17	13	Ret	6	7	24	17	17	11	17	16	14	27	26	19	6	7	2	14	18	Ret	14	17	15	17	18	17	302
6	(United Kingdom) Aiden Moffat	15	16	26	22	24	15	15	25	17	12	11	2	8	8	Ret	13	12	10	Ret	Ret	17	16	16	Ret	Ret	16	Ret	15	12	10	283
7	(Republic of Ireland) Árón Taylor-Smith	13	11	11	21	16	16	18	19	13	16	15	10	Ret	21	Ret	16	16	14	17	16	22	19	25	18	15	10	10	Ret	Ret	20	265
8	(United Kingdom) Michael Crees	14	15	16	12	Ret	DNS	13	12	8	14	13	Ret	16	Ret	Ret	26	19	16	Ret	21	18	8	9	8	16	19	20	20	21	Ret	253
9	(United Kingdom) Ash Hand	18	17	23	11	Ret	21	10	10	9	Ret	22	9	18	17	13	25	Ret	17	13	10	Ret	5	Ret	17	Ret	21	Ret	18	17	15	247
10	(United Kingdom) Jade Edwards	22	19	22	18	15	17	Ret	21	Ret	21	19	18	22	23	NC	22	20	24	Ret	22	23	25	23	21	17	24	23	22	25	21	182
11	(United Kingdom) Dexter Patterson	17	18	18	25	Ret	23	20	Ret	Ret	23	20	15	20	18	16	20	14	Ret	21	Ret	19	21	Ret	19	Ret	Ret	17	Ret	20	14	174
12	(United Kingdom) Nicolas Hamilton	19	23	24	27	21	24	26	24	Ret	22	27	22	23	22	21	24	24	Ret	24	23	Ret	26	Ret	Ret	23	Ret	Ret	21	Ret	Ret	119
13	(United Kingdom) Rick Parfitt Jr.	21	DNS	25	28	22	Ret	22	Ret	22	25	25	Ret				18	25	25	23	Ret	DNS	27	26	22	21	26	22	Ret	26	Ret	108
14	(United Kingdom) Will Powell				29	23	25	23	22	Ret	Ret	NC	21	Ret	24	22	21	Ret	26	25	Ret	24				22	25	Ret				76
15	(United Kingdom) Tom Oliphant																						24	24	20							23
–	(United Kingdom) Carl Boardley													WD	WD	WD													Ret	DNS	Ret	0
Pos.	Driver	DON			BHI			THR1			OUL			CRO			KNO			SNE			THR2			SIL			BHGP			Pts

=== Independent Teams' Trophy ===
Pos	Team	DON			BHI			THR1			OUL			CRO			KNO			SNE			THR2			SIL			BHGP			Pts
1	Rich Energy BTC Racing	8	5	3	1	1	8	1	1	5	8	9	3	15	11	2	15	13	8	6	7	2	13	8	1	13	8	6	11	7	2	521
2	Car Gods with Ciceley Motorsport	5	3	6	6	9	7	7	6	1	18	16	8	9	15	10	5	7	1	4	4	8	12	14	Ret	3	6	16	6	6	6	501
3	Autobrite Direct with JourneyHero	12	7	10	16	11	3	17	16	12	15	14	21	12	14	12	12	Ret	20	14	17	14	15	12	20	11	9	14	7	9	Ret	395
4	Laser Tools Racing	15	16	18	22	24	15	15	25	17	12	11	2	8	8	16	13	12	10	21	Ret	17	16	16	19	Ret	16	17	15	12	10	359
5	Yazoo with Safuu.com Racing	13	11	11	21	16	16	18	19	13	16	15	10	23	21	21	16	16	14	17	16	22	19	25	18	15	10	10	21	Ret	20	339
6	CarStore Power Maxed Racing	14	15	16	11	Ret	21	10	10	8	14	13	9	16	17	13	25	19	16	13	10	18	5	9	8	16	19	20	18	17	15	313
7	UptonSteel with Euro Car Parts Racing	21	DNS	25	28	22	Ret	22	Ret	22	25	25	Ret	WD	WD	WD	18	25	25	23	Ret	DNS	27	26	22	21	26	22	Ret	26	Ret	178
Pos	Team	DON			BHI			THR1			OUL			CRO			KNO			SNE			THR2			SIL			BHGP			Pts

=== Jack Sears Trophy ===
Pos.	Driver	DON			BHI			THR1			OUL			CRO			KNO			SNE			THR2			SIL			BHGP			Pts
1	(United Kingdom) Bobby Thompson	12	7	10	16	11	3	17	16	12	15	14	Ret	12	14	12	12	Ret	20	14	17	14	15	12	23	11	9	14	7	9	Ret	480
2	(United Kingdom) George Gamble	6	3	20	14	9	7	14	20	14	18	18	Ret	9	Ret	19	5	7	1	16	14	13	Ret	19	Ret	24	20	16	8	11	6	445
3	(United Kingdom) Ash Hand	18	17	23	11	Ret	21	10	10	9	Ret	22	9	18	17	13	25	Ret	17	13	10	Ret	5	Ret	17	Ret	21	Ret	18	17	15	365
4	(United Kingdom) Sam Osborne	23	20	17	24	20	18	19	23	15	19	21	Ret	21	19	20	17	17	23	19	20	20	23	20	Ret	20	23	21	Ret	22	16	329
5	(United Kingdom) Jade Edwards	22	19	22	18	15	17	Ret	21	Ret	21	19	18	22	23	NC	22	20	24	Ret	22	23	25	23	21	17	24	23	22	25	21	300
6	(United Kingdom) Dexter Patterson	17	18	18	25	Ret	23	20	Ret	Ret	23	20	15	20	18	16	20	14	Ret	21	Ret	19	21	Ret	19	Ret	Ret	17	Ret	20	14	280
7	(United Kingdom) Jack Butel	Ret	Ret	21	19	19	19	Ret	DNS	23	24	23	19				Ret	23	22	22	19	Ret	20	21	15	Ret	22	19	19	24	19	242
8	(United Kingdom) Nicolas Hamilton	19	23	24	27	21	24	26	24	Ret	22	27	22	23	22	21	24	24	Ret	24	23	Ret	26	Ret	Ret	23	Ret	Ret	21	Ret	Ret	192
9	(United Kingdom) Rick Parfitt Jr.	21	DNS	25	28	22	Ret	22	Ret	22	25	25	Ret				18	25	25	23	Ret	DNS	27	26	22	21	26	22	Ret	26	Ret	178
10	(United Kingdom) Will Powell				29	23	25	23	22	Ret	Ret	NC	21	Ret	24	22	21	Ret	26	25	Ret	24				22	25	Ret				124
11	(United Kingdom) James Gornall													14	Ret	17																28
–	(United Kingdom) Carl Boardley													WD	WD	WD													Ret	DNS	Ret	0
Pos.	Driver	DON			BHI			THR1			OUL			CRO			KNO			SNE			THR2			SIL			BHGP			Pts

=== Goodyear Wingfoot Award ===
Pos.	Driver	DON	BHI	THR1	OUL	CRO	KNO	SNE	THR2	SIL	BHGP	Pts
1	(United Kingdom) Jake Hill	1	2	2	15	6	1	2	3	2	5	145
2	(United Kingdom) Colin Turkington	2	1	4	9	1	3	1	15	10	10	125
3	(United Kingdom) Tom Ingram	4	6	8	1	4	8	4	13	4	1	121
4	(United Kingdom) Ashley Sutton	3	18	5	5	7	2	11	4	7	3	105
5	(United Kingdom) Dan Cammish	28	8	3	7	14	10	8	1	5	4	92
6	(United Kingdom) Adam Morgan	8	4	12	4	17	4	5	14	3	8	87
7	(United Kingdom) Rory Butcher	26	9	15	2	11	7	26	12	1	2	80
8	(United Kingdom) Stephen Jelley	7	3	10	12	12	5	3	16	11	11	74
9	(United Kingdom) Daniel Rowbottom	9	10	6	6	2	11	7	8	21	15	73
10	(United Kingdom) Josh Cook	16	5	1	10	20	14	22	2	12	9	67
11	(United Kingdom) Gordon Shedden	6	11	9	8	5	13	14	5	8	14	67
12	(United Kingdom) Daniel Lloyd	12	16	13	3	3	22	12	20	9	12	52
13	(United Kingdom) George Gamble	5	7	16	13	9	6	15	17	17	13	44
14	(United Kingdom) Ricky Collard	11	14	23	11	16	15	10	10	6	18	35
15	(United Kingdom) Jason Plato	10	22	7	14	18	19	6	11	19	17	32
16	(United Kingdom) Tom Chilton	15	12	18	23	8	16	9	9	14	22	29
17	(United Kingdom) Bobby Thompson	14	19	14	19	13	12	13	23	16	6	24
18	(United Kingdom) Ash Hand	19	13	11	21	23	17	17	6	15	16	19
19	(United Kingdom) Aiden Moffat	23	20	17	17	10	9	19	18	24	19	13
20	(United Kingdom) Dexter Patterson	27	15	26	22	28	23	21	22	22	7	10
21	(United Kingdom) Michael Crees	18	17	19	20	21	18	18	7	20	20	9
22	(United Kingdom) Sam Osborne	13	21	22	16	22	23	23	25	26	27	3
23	(United Kingdom) Ollie Jackson	17	23	24	18	19	26	25	24	13	23	3
24	(United Kingdom) James Gornall					15						1
25	(Republic of Ireland) Árón Taylor-Smith	22	24	20	25	24	21	16	26	23	21	0
26	(United Kingdom) Jack Butel	20	27	27	26		20	20	21	18	25	0
27	(United Kingdom) Jade Edwards	21	25	21	24	25	24	24	19	25	24	0
28	(United Kingdom) Nicolas Hamilton	24	26	25	27	26	29	27	28	27	29	0
29	(United Kingdom) Rick Parfitt Jr.	25	28	28	29		27	29	27	29	28	0
30	(United Kingdom) Carl Boardley					WD					26	0
31	(United Kingdom) Will Powell		29	29	28	27	28	28		28		0
32	(United Kingdom) Tom Oliphant								29			0
Pos.	Driver	DON	BHI	THR1	OUL	CRO	KNO	SNE	THR2	SIL	BHGP	Pts
