= Bobby Thompson (racing driver) =

British racing driver (born 1996)

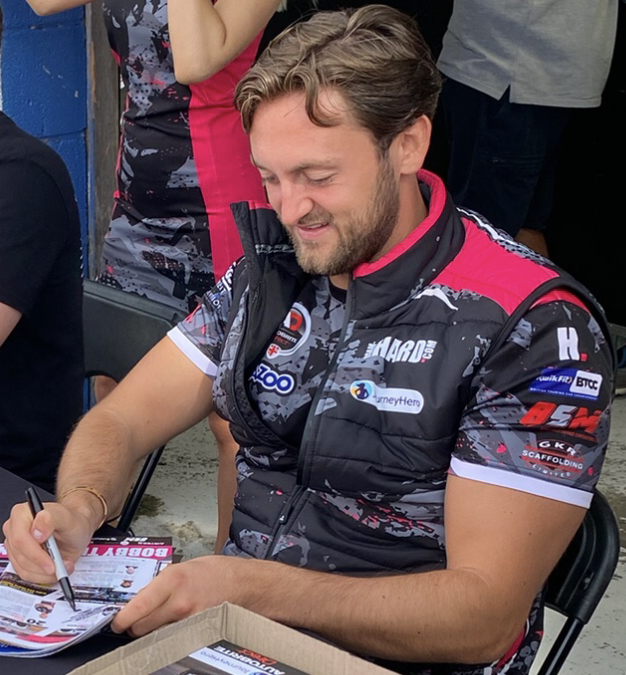
- Thompson at Thruxton Circuit in 2022
- Nationality: (United Kingdom) British
- Born: Robert David Thompson; 28 July 1996 (age 30) Hornchurch, England

British Touring Car Championship career
- Debut season: 2018
- Current team: Zeus Cloud Racing with WSR
- Categorisation: FIA Silver
- Car number: 19
- Former teams: AmD Essex, Tony Gilham Racing
- Starts: 130
- Wins: 0
- Podiums: 4
- Poles: 0
- Fastest laps: 1
- Best finish: 14th in 2022

Previous series
- 2015–2017 2014 2012–2014: VW Racing Cup; British Formula Ford Championship; Ford Fiesta Championship

Championship titles
- 2022 2017: Jack Sears Trophy; VW Racing Cup

Robert David Thompson (born 28 July 1996 in Hornchurch, England) is a British racing driver who most recently competed in the Snetterton round of the 2024 British Touring Car Championship, driving for Zeus Cloud Racing with WSR. He was the 2022 Jack Sears Trophy winner.

== Career ==
=== Early career ===
After competing in karting from 2006 to 2012 at a national level, Thompson made his car racing debut in 2012, competing in the Ford Fiesta Championship. He completed a full season in 2013, finishing 19th overall with one podium to his name.

Thompson competed as a guest driver for Meridian Motorsport in the second and third round of the 2014 British Formula Ford Championship, replacing Ashley Sutton.

=== VW Racing Cup ===
In 2015, Thompson moved to the Volkswagen Racing Cup Great Britain, driving for Team HARD. Racing. He finished tenth overall in his debut season, with one win. He switched to Power Maxed Racing to contest the 2016 season, and came fifth overall. Returning to Team HARD. Racing for 2017, he won the championship with six wins.

=== British Touring Car Championship ===
==== 2018 ====
Following his VW Racing Cup championship win, Thompson signed a contract to drive a Volkswagen CC for Team HARD in the 2018 British Touring Car Championship. He struggled in his debut season, finishing in the points just three times, at the sixth round of the season at Snetterton Circuit, and at the seventh at Rockingham Speedway. With 23 points, he finished 28th in the overall standings, and tenth in the Jack Sears Trophy.

==== 2019 ====
In October 2018, it was announced that Thompson had re-signed for Team HARD for the 2019 season, again driving a Volkswagen CC. He had a strong opening round, finishing sixth with fastest lap in the first race, and scoring in the other two. With ten points finishes throughout the season, he finished 22nd in the standings with 35 points, and third in the Jack Sears Trophy.

==== 2020 ====
For 2020, Thompson switched to GKR TradePriceCars.com, driving an Audi A3 Saloon. He had a strong start to his campaign, finishing in the points 11 times out of the 17 races he finished in the opening seven rounds. However, in the third race of the weekend during the seventh round at Croft Circuit, Thompson crashed and barrel-rolled his car whilst fighting over eight place with Senna Proctor. He was ruled out of the following round due to a concussion sustained in the crash, and did not appear at the final round either. As a result, Thompson came fifth and missed out on the title in the Jack Sears Trophy, which he was leading at the time of the crash. He came 18th in the overall standings, with 44 points.

==== 2021 ====
Due to financial constraints following his crash the previous season, Thompson was forced to sit out from the 2021 season. He made his racing return in October 2021, competing in the final two rounds of the 2021 Mini Challenge UK with JamSport Racing as a guest driver.

==== 2022 ====
Thompson returned to the championship for the 2022 season, driving a Cupra León for Team HARD. He had a strong season, achieving his first overall podium finish in the championship with a third place in the reverse grid race during the second round at Brands Hatch. He scored 99 points across the season and came 14th in the standings, and after a long battle for the title with George Gamble, Thompson sealed the Jack Sears Trophy trophy title during the final round at Brands Hatch.

==== 2023 ====
Thompson continued with Team HARD in the 2023 British Touring Car Championship, driving a new Cupra León. In the second round of the season at Brands Hatch, he achieved his second podium finish in the championship, converting reverse-grid pole into second place in the reverse grid race.

Prior to the sixth round of the season at Croft Circuit, Team HARD announced that Thompson would step down from the championship for the remainder of the season due to "financial circumstances faced by the team". He was replaced by Michael Crees.

== Personal life ==
Thompson's cousin Aaron Thompson is also a racing driver, who won the 2015 BRSCC Fiesta Junior Championship and the Clio Class of the 2021 Britcar Endurance Championship.

== Racing record ==
=== Karting career summary ===
Season	Series	Position
2006	Bayford Kart Club Summer Sprint Championship - Honda Cadet	4th
2007	Bayford Kart Club Summer Sprint Championship - Honda Cadet	9th
2007	Super 1 National Honda Cadet Championship	7th
2008	BRDC Stars of Tomorrow Minimax Championship	19th
2009	Formula Kart Stars - Minimax	15th
2009	Super 1 Series ABkC Minimax Championship	27th
2009	MSA Kartmasters Grand Prix - Rotax Minimax	17th
2010	Super 1 National Rotax Minimax Championship	10th
2010	Kartmasters British Grand Prix - Rotax Minimax	6th
2011	Trent Valley Kart Club - Junior Rotax	23rd
2011	Formula Kart Stars - Junior Max	11th
2012	Kartmasters British Grand Prix - Rotax Junior	18th
2012	Formula Kart Stars - Junior Max	**3rd**

=== Racing career summary ===
Season	Series	Team	Races	Wins	Poles	F/Laps	Podiums	Points	Position
2012	Ford Fiesta Championship - Class C	N/A	2	0	0	0	0	0	NC†
2013	Ford Fiesta Championship - Class C	N/A	15	0	0	0	1	36	19th
2014	Ford Fiesta Championship - Class C	N/A	2	0	0	0	0	23	33rd
2014	British Formula Ford Championship	Meridian Motorsport	6	0	0	0	0	N/A	NC†
2015	Volkswagen Racing Cup Great Britain	Team HARD. Racing	15	1	1	2	2	356	10th
2016	Volkswagen Racing Cup Great Britain	Power Maxed Racing	14	0	0	0	7	430	5th
2017	Volkswagen Racing Cup Great Britain	Team HARD. Racing	14	6	3	9	10	520	**1st**
2018	British Touring Car Championship	Team HARD. with Trade Price Cars	29	0	0	0	0	23	28th
2019	British Touring Car Championship	GKR Scaffolding with Autobrite Direct	30	0	0	1	0	35	22nd
2020	British Touring Car Championship	GKR TradePriceCars.com	21	0	0	0	0	44	18th
2021	Mini Challenge UK - JCW	JamSport Racing	6	0	0	0	1	N/A	NC†
2022	24 Hours of Dubai - TCX	CWS Engineering	1	0	0	1	0	N/A	10th
2022	24H TCE Series - TCX	CWS Engineering							
2022	British Touring Car Championship	Autobrite Direct with JourneyHero	30	0	0	0	1	99	14th
2023	British Touring Car Championship	Autobrite Direct with Millers Oils	14	0	0	0	1	74	17th
2023	British Touring Car Championship	Go-Fix with Autoaid Breakdown	6	0	0	0	1	74	17th
2024	British Touring Car Championship	Zeus Cloud Racing with WSR	3	0	0	0	1	34	20th
2026	GT World Challenge Europe Endurance Cup	Paradine Competition	2	0	0	0	0	0	NC

^{†} As Thompson was a guest driver, he was ineligible for championship points.

=== Complete British Touring Car Championship results ===
(key) (Races in bold indicate pole position – 1 point awarded just in first race; races in italics indicate fastest lap – 1 point awarded all races; * signifies that driver led race for at least one lap – 1 point given all races)

Year	Team	Car	1	2	3	4	5	6	7	8	9	10	11	12	13	14	15	16	17	18	19	20	21	22	23	24	25	26	27	28	29	30	DC	Points
2018	Team HARD. with Trade Price Cars	Volkswagen CC	BRH; 1; 19	BRH; 2 Ret	BRH; 3; 26	DON; 1; 20	DON; 2; 24	DON; 3; 20	THR; 1; 26	THR; 2; 20	THR; 3; 22	OUL; 1; 26	OUL; 2; 26	OUL; 3 DNS	CRO; 1; 24	CRO; 2; 27	CRO; 3; 21	SNE; 1; 18	SNE; 2; 14	SNE; 3; 10	ROC; 1; 24	ROC; 2 Ret	ROC; 3; 7	KNO; 1 Ret	KNO; 2 NC	KNO; 3; 20	SIL; 1; 19	SIL; 2 Ret	SIL; 3; 21	BRH; 1 Ret	BRH; 2 Ret	BRH; 3; 19	28th	23
2019	GKR Scaffolding with Autobrite Direct	Volkswagen CC	BRH; 1; 6	BRH; 2; 13	BRH; 3; 15	DON; 1; 18	DON; 2 Ret	DON; 3 Ret	THR; 1; 30	THR; 2; 22	THR; 3; 20	CRO; 1 Ret	CRO; 2; 23	CRO; 3; 14	OUL; 1; 19	OUL; 2; 21	OUL; 3 Ret	SNE; 1; 13	SNE; 2; 13	SNE; 3 Ret	THR; 1; 14	THR; 2; 22	THR; 3; 19	KNO; 1; 18	KNO; 2; 21	KNO; 3; 20	SIL; 1 Ret	SIL; 2; 13	SIL; 3; 10	BRH; 1; 21	BRH; 2; 16	BRH; 3; 15	22nd	35
2020	GKR TradePriceCars.com	Audi S3 Saloon	DON; 1; 11	DON; 2; 17	DON; 3; 15	BRH; 1; 14	BRH; 2 Ret	BRH; 3; 12	OUL; 1; 14	OUL; 2; 10	**OUL**; **3**; 18	KNO; 1; 18	KNO; 2 DSQ	KNO; 3; 19	THR; 1; 17	THR; 2 Ret	THR; 3; 15	SIL; 1; 18	SIL; 2; 13	SIL; 3; 12	CRO; 1; 8	CRO; 2; 8	CRO; 3 Ret	SNE; 1	SNE; 2	SNE; 3	BRH; 1	BRH; 2	BRH; 3				18th	44
2022	Autobrite Direct with JourneyHero	Cupra León	DON; 1; 12	DON; 2; 7	DON; 3; 10	BRH; 1; 16	BRH; 2; 11	BRH; 3; 3	THR; 1; 17	THR; 2; 16	THR; 3; 12	OUL; 1; 15	OUL; 2; 14	OUL; 3 Ret	CRO; 1; 12	CRO; 2; 14	CRO; 3; 12	KNO; 1; 12	KNO; 2 Ret	KNO; 3; 20	SNE; 1; 14	SNE; 2; 17	SNE; 3; 14	THR; 1; 15	THR; 2; 12	THR; 3; 23	SIL; 1; 11	SIL; 2; 9	SIL; 3; 14	BRH; 1; 7	BRH; 2; 9	BRH; 3 Ret	14th	99
2023	Autobrite Direct with Millers Oils	Cupra León	DON; 1; 16	DON; 2; 10	DON; 3; 6	BRH; 1; 6	BRH; 2; 11	**BRH**; **3**; 2	SNE; 1; 16	SNE; 2; 20	SNE; 3; 12	THR; 1; 10	THR; 2 Ret	THR; 3 DNS	OUL; 1; 7	OUL; 2 Ret	OUL; 3 Ret	CRO; 1	CRO; 2	CRO; 3	KNO; 1	KNO; 2	KNO; 3	DON; 1	DON; 2	DON; 3							17th	74*
2023	Go-Fix with Autoaid Breakdown	Cupra León																									SIL; 1; 5	SIL; 2 Ret	SIL; 3; 22	BRH; 1; 3	BRH; 2; 5	BRH; 3 Ret	17th	74*
2024	Zeus Cloud Racing with WSR	BMW 330e M Sport	DON; 1	DON; 2	DON; 3	BRH; 1	BRH; 2	BRH; 3	SNE; 1; 2	SNE; 2; 7	SNE; 3; 8	THR; 1	THR; 2	THR; 3	OUL; 1	OUL; 2	OUL; 3	CRO; 1	CRO; 2	CRO; 3	KNO; 1	KNO; 2	KNO; 3	DON; 1	DON; 2	DON; 3	SIL; 1	SIL; 2	SIL; 3	BRH; 1	BRH; 2	BRH; 3	20th	34

Sporting positions
Preceded by Daniel Rowbottom	Jack Sears Trophy; Winner; 2022	Succeeded by Andrew Watson
