= Dexter Patterson =

British racing driver (born 2003)

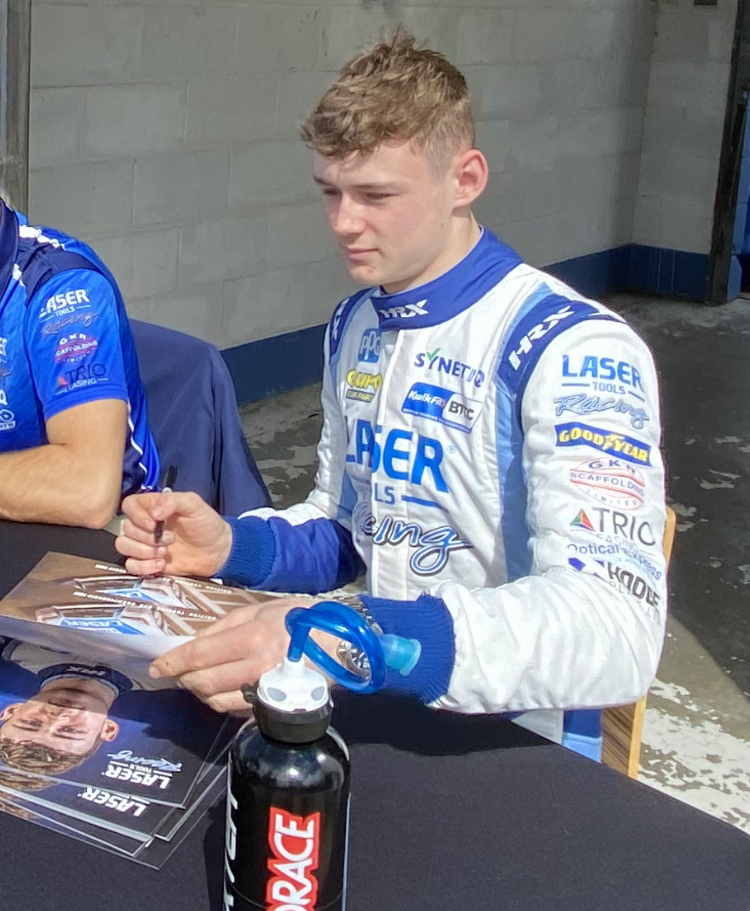
- Patterson at Thruxton in 2022 for the BTCC Season Launch.
- Nationality: (United Kingdom) British
- Born: Dexter Macham Patterson; 18 August 2003 (age 23) Glasgow, Scotland

British Touring Car Championship career
- Debut season: 2022
- Current team: Power Maxed Racing
- Categorisation: FIA Silver
- Car number: 17
- Former teams: Laser Tools Racing, ROKiT Racing with Un-Limited Motorsport
- Starts: 120 (120 entries)
- Wins: 0
- Podiums: 1
- Poles: 0
- Fastest laps: 0
- Best finish: 14th in 2026

Previous series
- 2023, 2022 2021 2020 2020: BTCC; GB3 Championship; Italian F4; Formula 4 UAE

Championship titles
- 2026: Jack Sears Trophy

Dexter Macham Patterson (born 18 August 2003) is a British racing driver from Scotland who competes in the British Touring Car Championship with Power Maxed Racing. He was a member of the Sauber Junior Team from 2019 until early 2021.

== Career ==
=== Karting ===
Patterson started competition karting in 2011 at the Trent Valley Kart Club. From there he moved onto national championships, winning the Super 1 National and Formula Kart Stars series in 2015 and achieved victory at the Kartmasters British Grand Prix in 2016 in the Rotax Mini Max class. 2017 would become Patterson's most successful year to date: he triumphed in the Trofeo delle Industrie and won the Junior Karting World Championship on his first attempt. He then raced in karts for two more seasons, with a notable success being victory in the WSK Super Master Series in 2019.

=== Lower formulae ===
In 2020, Patterson made his single-seater debut with a one-off appearance in the first round of the Formula 4 UAE Championship with Xcel Motorsport. Despite his lack of experience the Scot managed to finish all three races in the points, and ended up twelfth in the standings.

Patterson's main campaign for that season would lie in the Italian F4 Championship, where he would partner Jesse Salmenautio and fellow rookies Zdeněk Chovanec and Sebastian Øgaard at Bhaitech. He had a successful first round at Misano, where he got points in all three races, and he finished ninth in the following race at Imola. The eight points Patterson scored through the first four races would unfortunately be his only points of the season, as the team struggled with reliability. Patterson ended up 22nd in the championship, behind all of his teammates. He finished 15th in the Rookies' standings.

=== BRDC British F3 Championship ===
For 2021, Patterson progressed into the BRDC British Formula 3 Championship, driving for Douglas Motorsport alongside Reema Juffali. His first podium came at just his third race, with third place at the Brands Hatch Circuit. The next round at Silverstone would bring controversy however, as Patterson was disqualified from the first two races and excluded from the third one after an altercation in the paddock with Bryce Aron, who had collided with Patterson in the second race. Patterson bounced back in round three at Donington Park with three top-ten finishes and a best result of fourth that weekend, but would withdraw from the following round at Spa-Francorchamps. He finished the season in 21st place, being one of 19 drivers to have scored a podium throughout the campaign.

=== Formula Regional European Championship ===
On 20 July 2021, Monolite Racing announced that Patterson would be replacing the outgoing Jasin Ferati in the Formula Regional European Championship for the Spa-Francorchamps round. He finished the first race in 19th place, but would go on to score his first points in just his second start, finishing seventh and bringing Monolite their first points of the year.

=== Formula One ===
In 2019, the karting division of the Sauber Junior Team signed Patterson for Paterson's final year of karting competition. When he moved up to single-seaters in 2020 he was confirmed to become part of the academy. In February 2021, Patterson was released from the programme.

=== British Touring Car Championship ===
==== Laser Tools Racing (2022) ====
For 2022, Patterson moved to the British Touring Car Championship, driving an Infiniti Q50 for Laser Tools Racing alongside Aiden Moffat. He came 23rd in the overall standings with five points, and sixth in the Jack Sears Trophy, with nine podiums in class.

==== Team HARD (2023) ====
Patterson continued in the championship for 2023, this time moving to Team HARD to drive a Cupra León.

== Karting record ==
=== Karting career summary ===
| Season | Series | Team | Position |
|---|---|---|---|
| 2011 | Trent Valley Kart Club — Comer Cadet | | 9th |
| 2012 | Trent Valley Kart Club — Comer Cadet | | 19th |
| 2013 | Trent Valley Kart Club — IAME Cadet | AIM Motorsport | 19th |
| 2013 | LGM Series — IAME Cadet | | 7th |
| 2013 | Kartmasters British Grand Prix — IAME Cadet | | 8th |
| 2013 | Super One Series Championship — IAME Cadet | Fusion Junior | 4th |
| 2014 | LGM Series — IAME Cadet | | 5th |
| 2014 | Kartmasters British Grand Prix — IAME Cadet | | 5th |
| 2014 | Super 1 National Championship — IAME Cadet | AIM Motorsport | 7th |
| 2015 | LGM Series — IAME Cadet | AIM Motorsport | **3rd** |
| 2015 | Super 1 National Championship — IAME Cadet | AIM Motorsport | **1st** |
| 2015 | Kartmasters British Grand Prix — IAME Cadet | | 11th |
| 2015 | Formula Kart Stars — Super Cadet | | **1st** |
| 2016 | Kartmasters British Grand Prix — Rotax Mini Max | | **1st** |
| 2016 | British Open Championship — Rotax Mini Max | | 9th |
| 2016 | Super 1 National Championship — Rotax Mini Max | | 5th |
| 2017 | WSK Champions Cup — OKJ | | 32nd |
| 2017 | South Garda Winter Cup — OKJ | | 18th |
| 2017 | Trofeo delle Industrie — OKJ | | **1st** |
| 2017 | WSK Super Master Series — OKJ | | 11th |
| 2017 | Swedish Championship — OKJ | Forza Racing | **2nd** |
| 2017 | CIK-FIA European Championship — OKJ | | 24th |
| 2017 | CIK-FIA World Championship — OKJ | | **1st** |
| 2017 | WSK Final Cup — OKJ | | 18th |
| 2018 | WSK Champions Cup — OK | | 18th |
| 2018 | South Garda Winter Cup — OK | Forza Racing | 12th |
| 2018 | WSK Super Master Series — OK | | 11th |
| 2018 | CIK-FIA European Championship — OK | KR Motorsport Srl | 8th |
| 2018 | CIK-FIA World Championship — OK | KR Motorsport Srl | 4th |
| 2018 | WSK Final Cup — OK | | 5th |
| 2019 | WSK Champions Cup — OK | KR Motorsport | 18th |
| 2019 | South Garda Winter Cup — OK | KR Motorsport | **2nd** |
| 2019 | WSK Super Master Series — OK | KR Motorsport | **1st** |
| 2019 | Italian Championship — OK | | **2nd** |
| 2019 | WSK Euro Series — OK | Sauber Karting Team | **3rd** |
| 2019 | CIK-FIA European Championship — OK | Sauber Karting Team | **3rd** |
| 2019 | CIK-FIA World Championship — OK | Sauber Karting Team | 6th |

=== Complete CIK-FIA Karting European Championship results ===
(key) (Races in bold indicate pole position) (Races in italics indicate fastest lap)

| Year | Team | Class | 1 | 2 | 3 | 4 | 5 | 6 | 7 | 8 | 9 | 10 | DC | Points |
|---|---|---|---|---|---|---|---|---|---|---|---|---|---|---|
| 2017 | Birel ART Racing Srl | OKJ | SAR; QH; 47 | SAR; R DNQ | | | | | | | | | 24th | 10 |
| 2017 | Forza Racing | OKJ | | | CAY; QH; 7 | CAY; R 19 | LEM; QH; 18 | LEM; R 33 | ALA; QH; 22 | ALA; R 20 | KRI; QH; 7 | KRI; R 33 | 24th | 10 |
| 2018 | KR Motorsport Srl | OK | SAR; QH; 12 | SAR; R 19 | PFI; QH; 9 | PFI; R 13 | AMP; QH; 18 | AMP; R 32 | AUB; QH; 1 | **AUB**; **R** 1 | | | 8th | 41 |
| 2019 | Sauber Karting Team | OK | ANG; QH; 1 | **ANG**; **R** 1 | GEN; QH; 8 | GEN; R 2 | KRI; QH; 1 | **KRI**; **R** 4 | LEM; QH; 7 | LEM; R 32 | | | 3rd | 82 |

=== Complete Karting World Championship results ===
| Year | Team | Class | Quali Heats | Main race |
|---|---|---|---|---|
| 2017 | (United Kingdom) Forza Racing | OKJ | 3rd | **1st** |
| 2018 | (Sweden) KR Motorsport Srl | OK | 8th | **4th** |
| 2019 | (Sweden) Sauber Karting Team | OK | 12th | **6th** |

== Racing record ==
=== Racing career summary ===
| Season | Series | Team | Races | Wins | Poles | F/Laps | Podiums | Points | Position |
|---|---|---|---|---|---|---|---|---|---|
| 2020 | Formula 4 UAE Championship | Xcel Motorsport | 3 | 0 | 0 | 0 | 0 | 32 | 12th |
| 2020 | Italian F4 Championship | Bhaitech | 20 | 0 | 0 | 0 | 0 | 8 | 22nd |
| 2021 | GB3 Championship | Douglas Motorsport | 8 | 0 | 0 | 0 | 1 | 70 | 21st |
| 2021 | Formula Regional European Championship | Monolite Racing | 2 | 0 | 0 | 0 | 0 | 6 | 21st |
| 2021 | Euroformula Open Championship | Drivex School | 3 | 0 | 0 | 0 | 0 | 0 | NC† |
| 2022 | British Touring Car Championship | Laser Tools Racing | 30 | 0 | 0 | 0 | 0 | 5 | 23rd |
| 2023 | British Touring Car Championship | Re.Beverages and Bartercard with Team HARD. | 30 | 0 | 0 | 0 | 0 | 41 | 22nd |
| 2024 | GT4 European Series - Silver | Mahiki Racing | 10 | 0 | 0 | 0 | 0 | 0 | NC |
| 2024 | Nürburgring Langstrecken-Serie - VT2-FWD | Walkenhorst Motorsport | | | | | | | |
| 2025 | British Touring Car Championship | ROKiT Racing with Un-Limited Motorsport | 30 | 0 | 0 | 0 | 0 | 42 | 20th |
| 2026 | British Touring Car Championship | Steel Seal with Power Maxed Racing | 30 | 0 | 0 | 0 | 1 | 193 | 14th |

=== Complete Formula 4 UAE Championship results ===
(key) (Races in bold indicate pole position) (Races in italics indicate fastest lap)

| Year | Team | 1 | 2 | 3 | 4 | 5 | 6 | 7 | 8 | 9 | 10 | 11 | 12 | 13 | 14 | 15 | 16 | 17 | 18 | 19 | 20 | Pos | Points |
|---|---|---|---|---|---|---|---|---|---|---|---|---|---|---|---|---|---|---|---|---|---|---|---|
| 2020 | Xcel Motorsport | DUB1; 1; 4 | DUB1; 2; 4 | DUB1; 3; 6 | DUB1; 4 C | YMC1; 1 | YMC1; 2 | YMC1; 3 | YMC1; 4 | YMC2; 1 | YMC2; 2 | YMC2; 3 | YMC2; 4 | DUB2; 1 | DUB2; 2 | DUB2; 3 | DUB2; 4 | DUB3; 1 | DUB3; 2 | DUB3; 3 | DUB3; 4 | 12th | 32 |

=== Complete Italian F4 Championship results ===
(key) (Races in bold indicate pole position) (Races in italics indicate fastest lap)

| Year | Team | 1 | 2 | 3 | 4 | 5 | 6 | 7 | 8 | 9 | 10 | 11 | 12 | 13 | 14 | 15 | 16 | 17 | 18 | 19 | 20 | 21 | Pos | Points |
|---|---|---|---|---|---|---|---|---|---|---|---|---|---|---|---|---|---|---|---|---|---|---|---|---|
| 2020 | Bhaitech | MIS; 1; 10 | MIS; 2; 8 | MIS; 3; 10 | IMO1; 1; 9 | IMO1; 2 Ret | IMO1; 3; 13 | RBR; 1 Ret | RBR; 2; 16 | RBR; 3; 16 | MUG; 1; 19 | MUG; 2; 21 | MUG; 3; 22 | MNZ; 1; 12 | MNZ; 2; 18 | MNZ; 3; 11 | IMO2; 1; 14 | IMO2; 2 Ret | IMO2; 3; 23 | VLL; 1 Ret | VLL; 2 C | VLL; 3; 21 | 22nd | 8 |

=== Complete GB3 Championship results ===
(key) (Races in bold indicate pole position) (Races in italics indicate fastest lap)

| Year | Team | 1 | 2 | 3 | 4 | 5 | 6 | 7 | 8 | 9 | 10 | 11 | 12 | 13 | 14 | 15 | 16 | 17 | 18 | 19 | 20 | 21 | 22 | 23 | 24 | DC | Points |
|---|---|---|---|---|---|---|---|---|---|---|---|---|---|---|---|---|---|---|---|---|---|---|---|---|---|---|---|
| 2021 | Douglas Motorsport | BRH; 1; 13 | BRH; 2; 11 | BRH; 3; 3^{3} | SIL1; 1 DSQ | SIL1; 2 DSQ | SIL1; 3 EX | DON1; 1; 7 | DON1; 2; 8 | DON1; 3; 4^{4} | SPA; 1 WD | SPA; 2 WD | SPA; 3 WD | SNE; 1 | SNE; 2 | SNE; 3 | SIL2; 1 | SIL2; 2 | SIL2; 3 | OUL; 1 | OUL; 2 | OUL; 3 | DON2; 1 | DON2; 2 | DON2; 3 | 21st | 70 |

=== Complete Formula Regional European Championship results ===
(key) (Races in bold indicate pole position) (Races in italics indicate fastest lap)

| Year | Team | 1 | 2 | 3 | 4 | 5 | 6 | 7 | 8 | 9 | 10 | 11 | 12 | 13 | 14 | 15 | 16 | 17 | 18 | 19 | 20 | DC | Points |
|---|---|---|---|---|---|---|---|---|---|---|---|---|---|---|---|---|---|---|---|---|---|---|---|
| 2021 | Monolite Racing | IMO; 1 | IMO; 2 | CAT; 1 | CAT; 2 | MCO; 1 | MCO; 2 | LEC; 1 | LEC; 2 | ZAN; 1 | ZAN; 2 | SPA; 1; 19 | SPA; 2; 7 | RBR; 1 | RBR; 2 | VAL; 1 | VAL; 2 | MUG; 1 | MUG; 2 | MNZ; 1 WD | MNZ; 2 WD | 21st | 6 |

=== Complete Euroformula Open Championship results ===
(key) (Races in bold indicate pole position) (Races in italics indicate fastest lap)

| Year | Team | 1 | 2 | 3 | 4 | 5 | 6 | 7 | 8 | 9 | 10 | 11 | 12 | 13 | 14 | 15 | 16 | 17 | 18 | 19 | 20 | 21 | 22 | 23 | 24 | DC | Points |
|---|---|---|---|---|---|---|---|---|---|---|---|---|---|---|---|---|---|---|---|---|---|---|---|---|---|---|---|
| 2021 | Double R Racing | POR; 1 | POR; 2 | POR; 3 | LEC; 1 | LEC; 2 | LEC; 3 | SPA; 1 | SPA; 2 | SPA; 3 | HUN; 1 | HUN; 2 | HUN; 3 | IMO; 1 | IMO; 2 | IMO; 3 | RBR; 1 | RBR; 2 | RBR; 3 | MNZ; 1 | MNZ; 2 | MNZ; 3 | CAT; 1; 14 | CAT; 2; 13 | CAT; 3; 13 | NC | 0 |

=== Complete British Touring Car Championship results ===
(key) Races in bold indicate pole position (1 point awarded – 2002–2003 all races, 2004–present just in first race) Races in italics indicate fastest lap (1 point awarded all races) * signifies that driver lead race for at least one lap (1 point awarded – 2002 just in feature races, 2003–present all races; ^{Superscript} number indicates points-scoring qualifying race position)

| Year | Team | Car | 1 | 2 | 3 | 4 | 5 | 6 | 7 | 8 | 9 | 10 | 11 | 12 | 13 | 14 | 15 | 16 | 17 | 18 | 19 | 20 | 21 | 22 | 23 | 24 | 25 | 26 | 27 | 28 | 29 | 30 | DC | Points |
|---|---|---|---|---|---|---|---|---|---|---|---|---|---|---|---|---|---|---|---|---|---|---|---|---|---|---|---|---|---|---|---|---|---|---|
| 2022 | Laser Tools Racing | Infiniti Q50 | DON; 1; 17 | DON; 2; 18 | DON; 3; 18 | BRH; 1; 25 | BRH; 2 Ret | BRH; 3; 23 | THR; 1; 20 | THR; 2 Ret | THR; 3 Ret | OUL; 1; 23 | OUL; 2; 20 | OUL; 3; 15 | CRO; 1; 20 | CRO; 2; 18 | CRO; 3; 16 | KNO; 1; 20 | KNO; 2; 14 | KNO; 3 Ret | SNE; 1; 20 | SNE; 2 Ret | SNE; 3; 19 | THR; 1; 21 | THR; 2 Ret | THR; 3; 19 | SIL; 1 Ret | SIL; 2 Ret | SIL; 3; 17 | BRH; 1 Ret | BRH; 2; 20 | BRH; 3; 14 | 23rd | 5 |
| 2023 | Re.Beverages and Bartercard with Team HARD. | Cupra León | DON; 1; 14 | DON; 2; 18 | DON; 3; 16 | BRH; 1; 17 | BRH; 2; 17 | BRH; 3; 15 | SNE; 1; 20 | SNE; 2; 22 | SNE; 3; 13 | THR; 1; 16 | THR; 2; 15 | THR; 3; 15 | OUL; 1; 14 | OUL; 2; 14 | OUL; 3; 20 | CRO; 1; 17 | CRO; 2 Ret | CRO; 3; 13 | KNO; 1; 12 | KNO; 2; 13 | KNO; 3; 6 | DON; 1; 21 | DON; 2; 18 | DON; 3; 14 | SIL; 1; 18 | SIL; 2; 19 | SIL; 3; 16 | BRH; 1; 17 | BRH; 2; 14 | BRH; 3; 11 | 22nd | 41 |
| 2025 | ROKiT Racing with Un-Limited Motorsport | Cupra León | DON; 1; 11 | DON; 2; 9 | DON; 3 Ret | BRH; 1; 19 | BRH; 2 Ret | BRH; 3; 21 | SNE; 1; 19 | SNE; 2; 20 | SNE; 3; 13 | THR; 1; 20 | THR; 2; 15 | THR; 3; 16 | OUL; 1 Ret | OUL; 2; 19 | OUL; 3 DSQ | CRO; 1; 12 | CRO; 2; 11 | CRO; 3; 11 | KNO; 1; 13 | KNO; 2; 17 | KNO; 3; 14 | DON; 1; 19 | DON; 2; 16 | DON; 3; 16 | SIL; 1; 17 | SIL; 2; 17 | SIL; 3; 15 | BRH; 1; 16 | BRH; 2; 16 | BRH; 3; 10 | 20th | 42 |
| 2026 | Steel Seal with Power Maxed Racing | Audi S3 Saloon | DON; 1; 7^{10} | DON; 2; 7 | DON; 3; 6 | BRH; 1 Ret^{8} | BRH; 2; 9 | BRH; 3; 11 | SNE; 1; 16^{11} | SNE; 2; 19 | SNE; 3; 17 | OUL; 1; 11^{8} | OUL; 2; 8 | OUL; 3; 8 | THR; 1; 16^{14} | THR; 2; 16 | THR; 3; 9 | KNO; 1; 7^{13} | KNO; 2; 8 | KNO; 3; 4 | DON; 1; 7^{10} | DON; 2; 6 | DON; 3; 10 | CRO; 1; 18 | CRO; 2; 12 | CRO; 3; 8 | SIL; 1; 18^{11} | SIL; 2; 14 | SIL; 3; 19 | BRH; 1; 9^{9} | BRH; 2; 9 | **BRH**; **3**; 3 | 14th | 193 |

=== Complete GT4 European Series results ===
(key) (Races in bold indicate pole position) (Races in italics indicate fastest lap)

| Year | Team | Car | Class | 1 | 2 | 3 | 4 | 5 | 6 | 7 | 8 | 9 | 10 | 11 | 12 | Pos | Points |
|---|---|---|---|---|---|---|---|---|---|---|---|---|---|---|---|---|---|
| 2024 | Mahiki Racing | Lotus Emira GT4 | Silver | LEC; 1; 42† | LEC; 2; 36 | MIS; 1; 24 | MIS; 2 Ret | SPA; 1 Ret | SPA; 2 Ret | HOC; 1 Ret | HOC; 2 Ret | MNZ; 1; 28 | MNZ; 2 Ret | JED; 1 | JED; 2 | NC | 0 |

Sporting positions
| Preceded by Daryl De Leon | Jack Sears Trophy; Winner; 2026 | Succeeded by Incumbent |
