= Tony Gilham Racing =

British motor racing team

(United Kingdom) Team HARD.
- Founded: 2012
- Folded: 2024
- Team principal(s): Tony Gilham
- Current series: VW Racing Cup; Ginetta GT4 Supercup; Renault Clio Cup UK; Britcar Endurance Championship; GT Cup Championship
- Noted drivers: Bobby Thompson; Jack Goff; Michael Crees; Carl Boardley; Tom Barley; Darron Lewis; Simon Rudd; Jade Edwards; Max Coates; Tom Knight; Michael Epps; Toby Davis; Nicolas Hamilton; Howard Fuller; Mike Bushell
- Website: team-hard.com

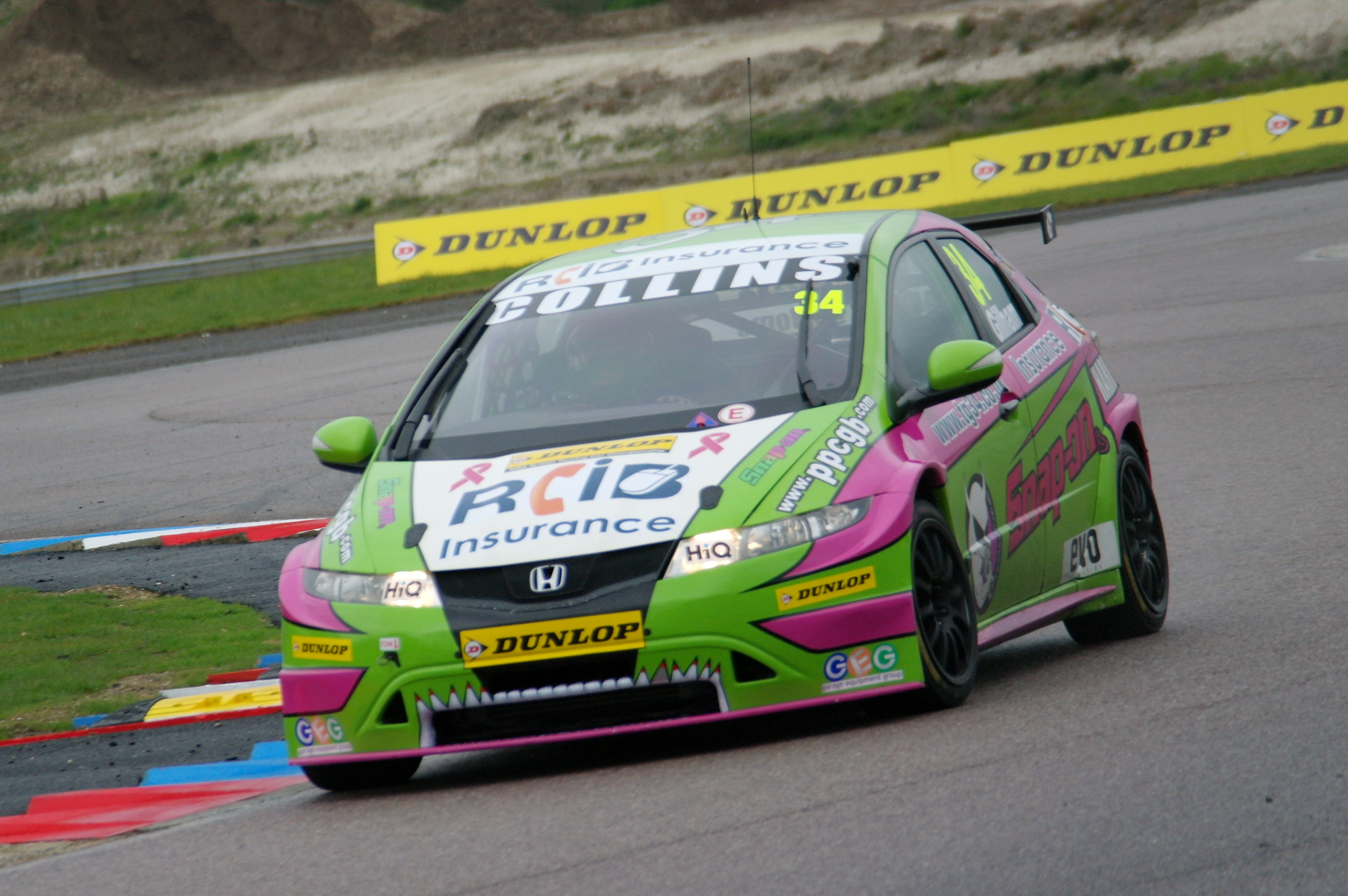
Tony Gilham driving for Team HARD in the 2012 British Touring Car Championship at Thruxton.

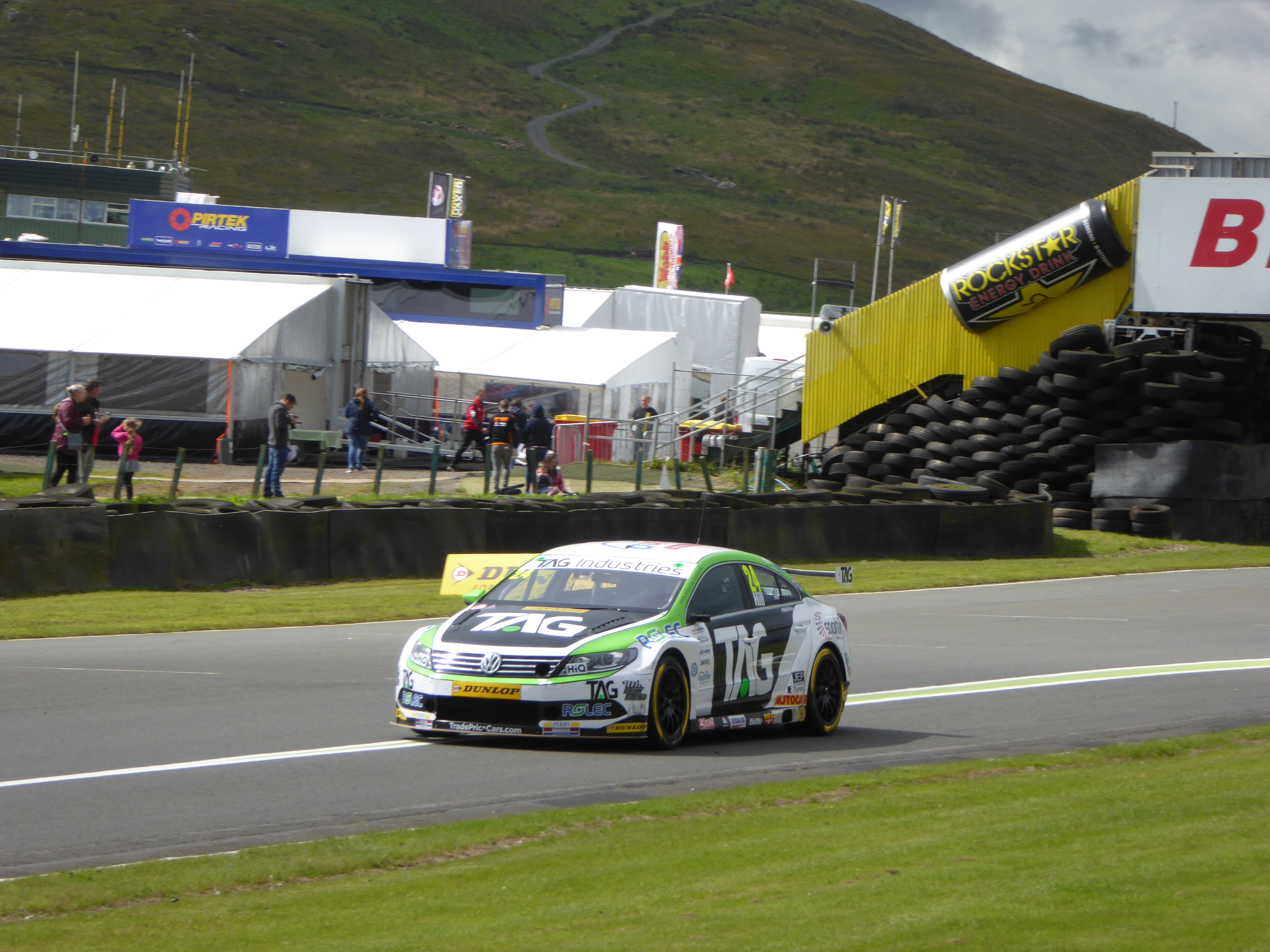
Jake Hill driving for Team HARD in the 2017 British Touring Car Championship at Knockhill.

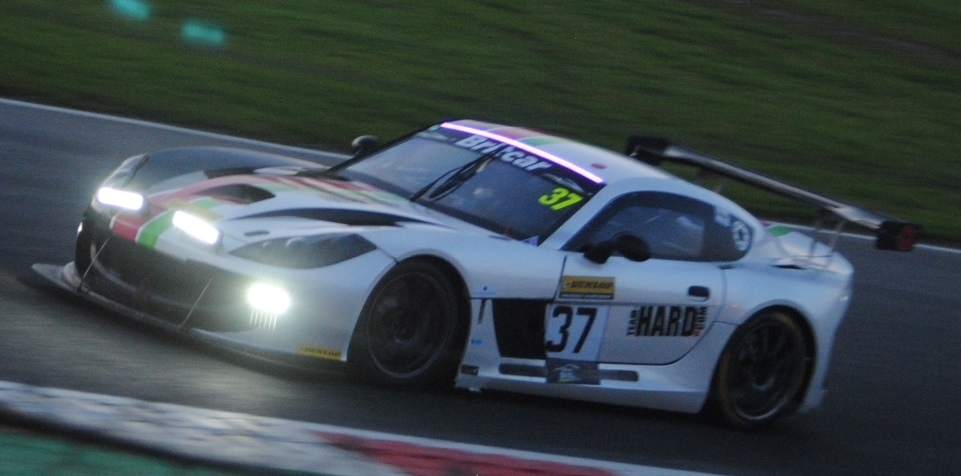
Team HARD entered two Ginetta G55 Supercup cars in the 2019 Britcar night races at Brands Hatch.

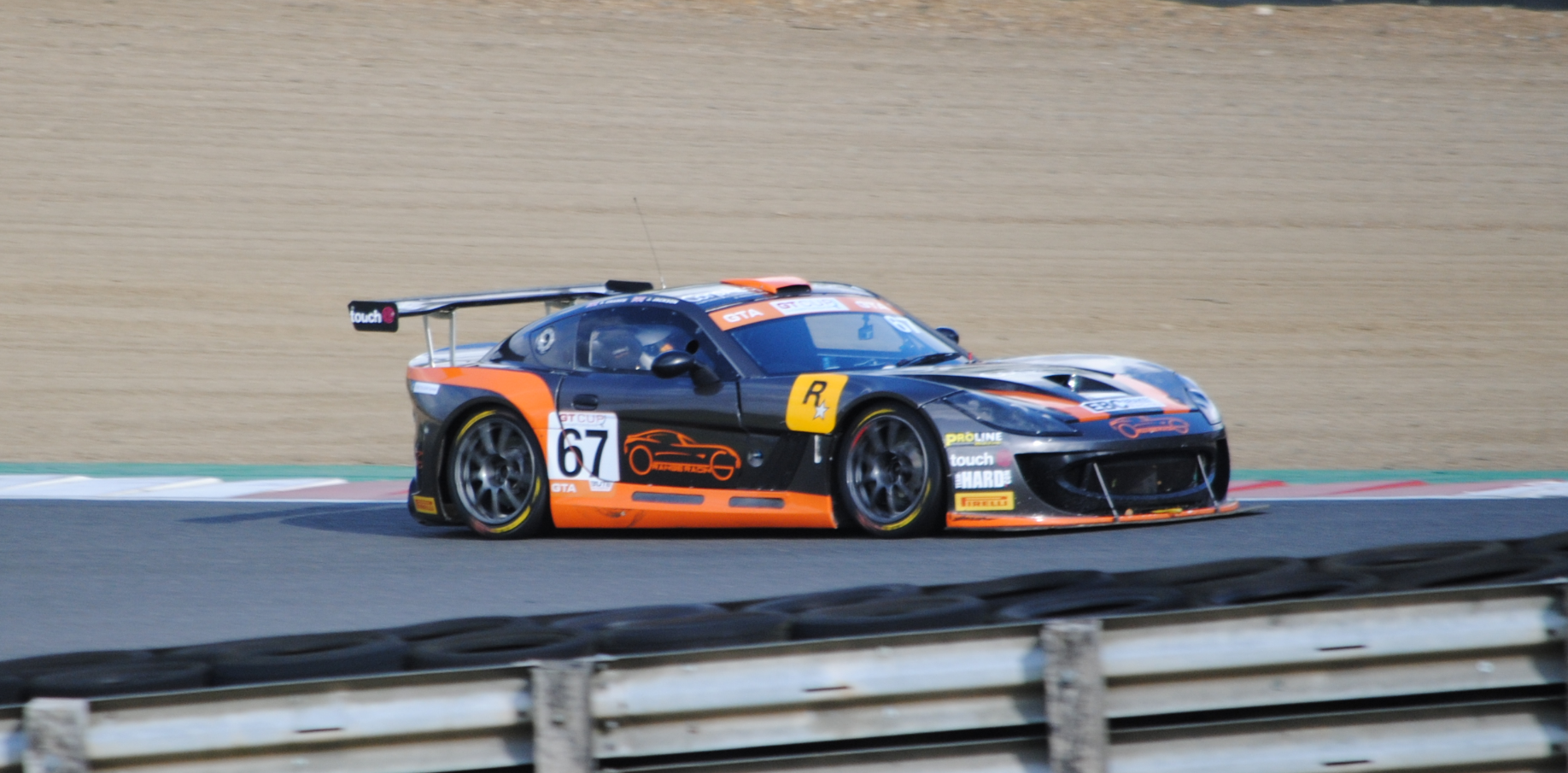
A Ginetta G55 Supercup run by Team HARD, driven by Joshua Jackson and Simon Orange and competing in the GT Cup Championship.

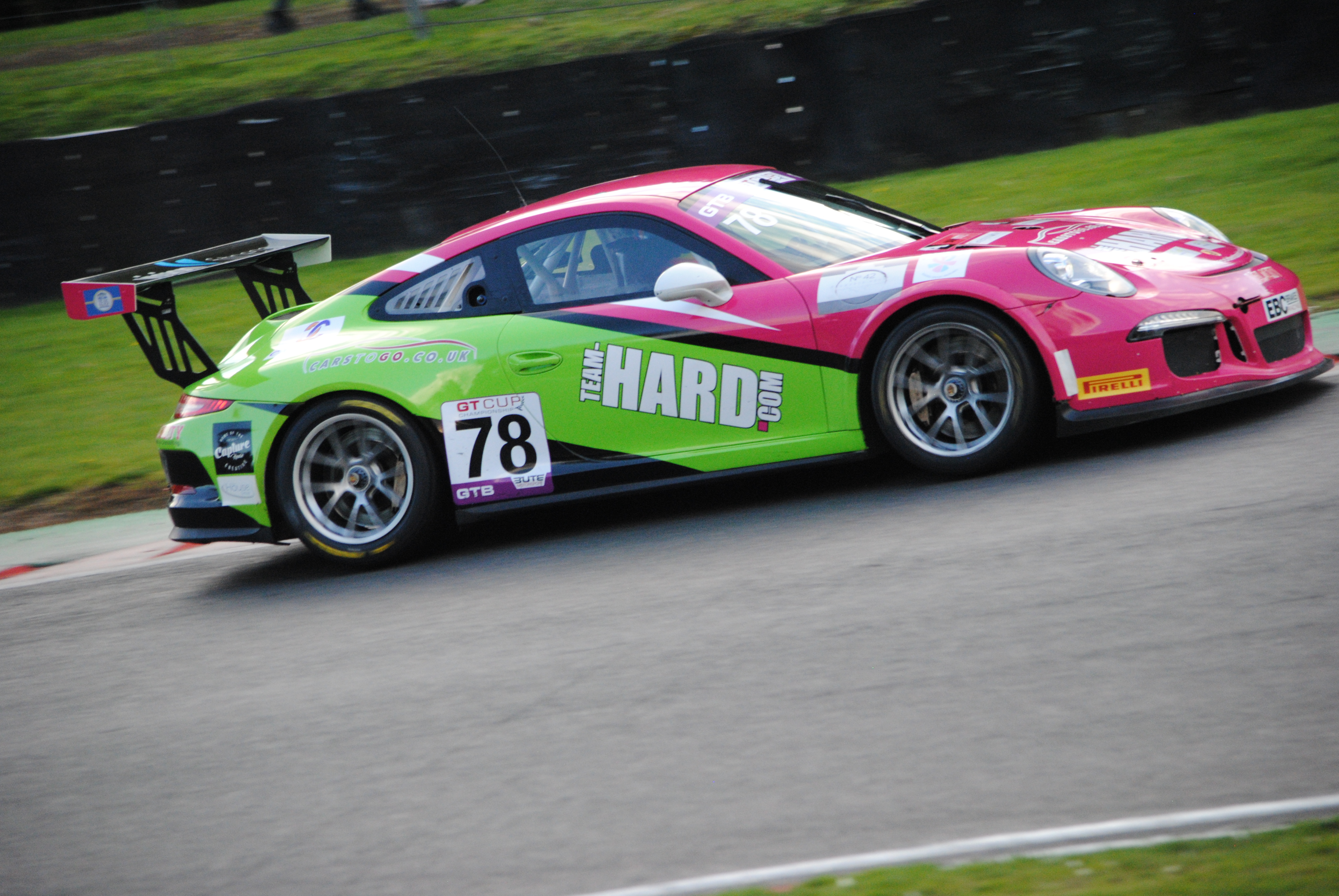
A Porsche 991 GT3 Cup run by Team HARD, Ben Clayden and Sam Randon and competing in the GT Cup Championship.

Tony Gilham Racing, also known as Team HARD., was a British motor racing teamfounded by Tony Gilham. The team most notably raced with sponsors as their entrant names, such as Re.Beverages and Bartercard and Autobrite Direct with Miller Oils. The team was later bought out by Bob Sharpless' Un-Limited Motorsport in 2024.

They competed in the British Touring Car Championship, Volkswagen Racing Cup, Ginetta GT4 Supercup, Mini Challenge UK and the GT Cup series.

== British Touring Car Championship ==
=== 2012–2020 ===
In February 2012, Gilham announced he had purchased a Super 2000 Honda Civic from Team Dynamics. The following month he announced the formation of Tony Gilham Racing which would run the car in the 2012 British Touring Car Championship season under the RCIB Insurance & HARD. banner. Gilham started on pole position for the reversed grid race at Thruxton but having already slipped down to third, he damaged the car and retired from the race. Gilham took the first podium finish for the team at Donington Park in race three after Mat Jackson was disqualified, finishing third behind Gordon Shedden and Jason Plato. Robb Holland took over the car for the meetings at Snetterton and Knockhill. Holland failed to finish his first race when he collided with the Speedworks Motorsport Toyota Avensis of Adam Morgan. Former Formula Renault BARC driver Howard Fuller raced the car in the meetings at Rockingham and Silverstone. He achieved a best result of eleventh in the first and third races at Silverstone. Prior to the final round of the season at Brands Hatch, Tony Gilham Racing bought a full NGTC–spec Vauxhall Insignia from Thorney Motorsport along with an incomplete shell which would be built up over the winter. Gilham raced the Insignia at Brands Hatch and former Ginetta GT Supercup driver Aaron Williamson drove the Honda Civic.

In December 2012, Team HARD. announced the development of an NGTC Volkswagen CC to compete in the 2013 season which would run alongside a pair of Vauxhall Insignias and the S2000 Honda Civic. The team signed series rookie Jack Goff to drive the first of the Insignias later that month. The first of the Volkswagen CC drivers was announced at the beginning of January 2013 with Tom Onslow-Cole joining the team from eBay Motors in a three-year deal. The second Insignia seat was filled by former FIA Formula Two Championship driver James Cole. Robb Holland will return to the team for a minimum of two rounds which do not clash with his drive in the World Touring Car Championship. The team sold their S2000 Honda Civic prior to the start of the 2013 season in order to focus on starting the season with three NGTC cars. The team ran their cars under two names, the Vauxhall Insignias were run under the RCIB Insurance Racing banner and the Volkswagen CCs were run under the PPCGB.com/Kraftwerk Racing banner.

Howard Fuller and Robb Holland were due to share the other Volkswagen, however this never occurred and from Snetterton onwards the team entered partnership with Team BMR Restart by supplying them with a NGTC Volkswagen CC (the team had previously been running outdated S2000 machinery). Tom Onslow-Cole managed to grab three podiums at Thruxton and Croft while his teammates struggled to make it into the top 10 in their insignias. James Cole left the team in July and he was replaced by Robb Holland. Scottish Legends racer Kieran Gallagher replaced Holland for the Knockhill round, little over a year since Gallagher gained his racing licence. Goff decided to miss the Knockhill round in order to save his sponsorship budget, with Paul O'Neill stepping in . Goff returned for the Rockingham round while Howard Fuller took the second Insignia. Onslow-Cole left the team and joined Motorbase the final three rounds of the season In the final race of the year at Brands Hatch, Jack Goff finished second after battling with reigning champion Gordon Shedden for the lead. The two teams managed to accumulate 4 podiums between them and finish 9th and 11th in the championship respectively.

Before the start of the 2014 British Touring Car Championship season, Tony Gilham Racing merged with Team BMR to form Team BMR Racing. Goff was confirmed as their first driver, racing under the RCIB Insurance Racing banner in a Vauxhall Insignia.

By the mid way point of the 2014 season at Snetterton, Warren Scott and his Team BMR racing team had severed all ties with Tony Gilham Racing after purchasing all of the teams assets, including the pair of Vauxhall Insignia's and Volkswagen Passat CCs. From that round onwards the team continued to run under the Chrome Edition Restart Racing Banner fielding four Volkswagens for Warren Scott, Alain Menu, Árón Smith and Jack Goff. Tony Gilham and Team HARD. re-emerged at the start of the 2015 season with a single car entry after a deal was done with United Autosports to acquire one of their Toyota Avensis' that was previously raced by Frank Wrathall. Scot Kieran Gallagher has raced the Avensis at each round with a string of poor results to date, with the car not even taking to the grid on several occasions, as the team and driver continue to struggle with budget issues.

=== Cupra Leon (2021–2023) ===
The team introduced the Cupra brand to the BTCC for the first time in 2021, with Jack Goff, Glynn Geddie and Árón Taylor-Smith driving three brand new Cupra Leóns.

Due to financial difficulties, the team downsized in 2024 and were slated to compete with two cars in the 2024 British Touring Car Championship. The team were later sold to Bob Sharpless, rebranding as Un-Limited Motorsport for 2024 with a single car effort.

=== BTCC Results ===
British Touring Car Championship results
Year	Team name	Car	Drivers	Wins	Podiums	Poles	Fastest laps	Points	D.C.	T.C.	I.D.C.	I.T.C.
2012	RCIB Insurance Racing	Vauxhall Insignia	Tony Gilham	0	0	0	0	71	17th	11th	14th	8th
2012	RCIB Insurance Racing	Honda Civic	Tony Gilham	0	1	0	0	71	17th	11th	14th	8th
2012	RCIB Insurance Racing	Honda Civic	Howard Fuller	0	0	0	0	16	24th	11th	21st	8th
2012	RCIB Insurance Racing	Honda Civic	Aaron Williamson	0	0	0	0	2	27th	11th	23rd	8th
2012	RCIB Insurance Racing	Honda Civic	Robb Holland	0	0	0	0	6	26th	11th	22nd	8th
2013	RCIB Insurance Racing	Vauxhall Insignia										
2013	RCIB Insurance Racing	Vauxhall Insignia	Robb Holland	0	0	0	0	3	31st	11th	28th	8th
2013	RCIB Insurance Racing	Vauxhall Insignia	Jack Goff	0	1	0	0	73	17th	11th	13th	8th
2013	RCIB Insurance Racing	Vauxhall Insignia	James Cole	0	0	0	0	11	21st	11th	18th	8th
2013	RCIB Insurance Racing	Vauxhall Insignia	Howard Fuller	0	0	0	0	6	26th	11th	20th	8th
2013	RCIB Insurance Racing	Vauxhall Insignia	Kieran Gallagher	0	0	0	0	3	28th	11th	30th	8th
2013	RCIB Insurance Racing	Vauxhall Insignia	Tom Barley	0	0	0	0	0	35th	11th	32nd	8th
2013	RCIB Insurance Racing	Vauxhall Insignia	Paul O'Neill	0	0	0	0	0	NC	11th	NC	8th
2013	PPCGB.com/Kraftwerk Racing	Volkswagen CC	Tom Onslow-Cole	0	3	0	0	116	12th	9th	7th	7th
2013	PPCGB.com/Kraftwerk Racing	Volkswagen CC	Aiden Moffat	0	0	0	0	3	30th	9th	23rd	7th
2013	PPCGB.com/Kraftwerk Racing	Volkswagen CC	Andy Wilmot	0	0	0	0	0	38th	9th	32nd	7th
2015	RCIB Insurance Racing	Toyota Avensis										
2015	RCIB Insurance Racing	Toyota Avensis	Kieran Gallagher	0	0	0	0	1	30th	18th	22nd	15th
2015	RCIB Insurance Racing	Toyota Avensis	Tony Gilham	0	0	0	0	1	32nd	18th	23rd	15th
2016	RCIB Insurance Racing	Toyota Avensis										
2016	RCIB Insurance Racing	Toyota Avensis	Michael Epps	0	0	0	0	23	24th	11th	22nd	5th
2016	RCIB Insurance Racing	Toyota Avensis	Jake Hill	0	0	0	0	83	17th	11th	23rd	5th
2016	TLC Racing	Toyota Avensis										
2016	TLC Racing	Toyota Avensis	Chris Smiley	0	0	0	0	0	30th	18th	20th	14th
2016	TLC Racing	Toyota Avensis	Michael Caine	0	0	0	0	0	33rd	18th	24th	14th
2016	TLC Racing	Toyota Avensis	Tony Gilham	0	0	0	0	0	35th	18th	23rd	14th
2017	Autoaid/RCIB Insurance Racing	Volkswagen CC										
2017	Autoaid/RCIB Insurance Racing	Volkswagen CC	Michael Epps	0	0	0	0	77	17th	13th	8th	5th
2017	Autoaid/RCIB Insurance Racing	Volkswagen CC	Will Burns	0	0	0	0	0	35th	13th	18th	5th
2017	TAG Racing	Volkswagen CC	Jake Hill	0	0	0	0	63	20th	15th	10th	11th
2018	Trade Price Cars with Brisky Racing	Volkswagen CC										
2018	Trade Price Cars with Brisky Racing	Volkswagen CC	Mike Bushell	0	0	0	0	59	24th	16th	16th	10th
2018	Trade Price Cars with Brisky Racing	Volkswagen CC	Jake Hill	0	1	0	0	29	26th	16th	19th	10th
2018	Trade Price Cars with Brisky Racing	Volkswagen CC	Daniel Welch	0	0	0	0	0	37th	16th	26th	10th
2018	Trade Price Cars with Brisky Racing	Volkswagen CC	Ollie Pidgley	0	0	0	0	0	38th	16th	27th	10th
2018	Team HARD with Trade Price Cars	Volkswagen CC								16th		10th
2018	Team HARD with Trade Price Cars	Volkswagen CC	Bobby Thompson	0	0	0	0	23	28th	21st	17th	14th
2018	Team HARD with Trade Price Cars	Volkswagen CC	Michael Caine	0	0	0	0	0	36th	21st	24th	14th
2018	Team HARD with Trade Price Cars	Volkswagen CC	Carl Boardley	0	0	0	0	0	NC	21st	NC	14th
2018	Team HARD with Trade Price Cars	Volkswagen CC	Ethan Hammerton	0	0	0	0	0	39th	21st	28th	14th
2019	GKR Scaffolding with Autobrite Direct	Volkswagen CC										
2019	GKR Scaffolding with Autobrite Direct	Volkswagen CC	Bobby Thompson	0	0	0	1	35	22nd	15th	11th	9th
2019	GKR Scaffolding with Autobrite Direct	Volkswagen CC	Michael Crees	0	0	0	0	11	26th	15th	19th	9th
2019	RCIB Insurance with Fox Transport	Volkswagen CC										
2019	RCIB Insurance with Fox Transport	Volkswagen CC	Jack Goff	1	1	0	1	47	21st	14th	12th	7th
2019	RCIB Insurance with Fox Transport	Volkswagen CC	Carl Boardley	0	0	0	0	5	29th	14th	15th	7th
2020	RCiB Insurance with Fox Transport	Volkswagen CC	Jack Goff	0	0	0	0	11	23rd	14th	16th	9th
2020	RCiB Insurance with Fox Transport	Volkswagen CC	Mike Bushell	0	0	0	0	1	27th	14th	21st	9th
2020	RCiB Insurance with Fox Transport	Volkswagen CC	Glynn Geddie	0	0	0	0	1	29th	14th	23rd	9th
2020	RCiB Insurance with Fox Transport	Volkswagen CC	Tom Onslow-Cole	0	0	0	0	0	31st	14th	26th	9th
2020	RCiB Insurance with Fox Transport	Volkswagen CC	Ollie Brown	0	0	0	0	3	25th	14th	25th	9th
2020	ROKiT Racing with Team HARD.	Volkswagen CC	Nicolas Hamilton	0	0	0	0	1	28th	16th	24th	13th
2020	HUB Financial Solutions with Team HARD	BMW 125i	Carl Boardley	0	0	0	0	18	21st	13th	15th	11th
2021	Team HARD with Autobrite Direct	Cupra León	Jack Mitchell									
2021	Team HARD with Autobrite Direct	Cupra León	Jack Goff									
2021	Team HARD with Autobrite Direct	Cupra León	Glynn Geddie									
2021	ROKiT Racing with iQuoto Online Trading	Cupra León	Nicolas Hamilton									
2021	Team HARD with HUB Financial Solutions	Cupra León	Árón Taylor-Smith									
2022	Autobrite Direct with JourneyHero	Cupra León	Carl Boardley									
2022	Autobrite Direct with JourneyHero	Cupra León	Tom Oliphant									
2022	Autobrite Direct with JourneyHero	Cupra León	Bobby Thompson									
2022	Autobrite Direct with JourneyHero	Cupra León	Will Powell									
2022	Yazoo with Safuu.com Racing	Cupra León	Nicolas Hamilton									
2022	Yazoo with Safuu.com Racing	Cupra León	Árón Taylor-Smith									
2023	Re.Beverages and Bartercard with Team HARD	Cupra León	Dexter Patterson									
2023	Re.Beverages and Bartercard with Team HARD	Cupra León	Jade Edwards									
2023	Autobrite Direct with Millers Oils	Cupra León	Bobby Thompson									
2023	Autobrite Direct with Millers Oils	Cupra León	Dan Lloyd									
2023	Go-Fix with Autoaid Breakdown	Cupra León	Nicolas Hamilton									
2023	Go-Fix with Autoaid Breakdown	Cupra León	Jack Butel									
Year	Team name	Car	Drivers	Wins	Podiums	Poles	Fastest laps	Points	D.C.	T.C.	I.D.C.	I.T.C.

== Britcar Endurance Championship ==
=== Ginetta G55 GT4 ===
Team HARD entered Britcar, for the 'Into-the-Night' race at Brands Hatch, at the end of the 2016 season with two Ginetta G55 GT4s. The cars were entered as invitation entries, ineligible to score points, in Class 3, with Darron Lewis and Daniel Wylie alongside Tom Knight and Dan Kirby. Lewis and Wylie qualified 8th on the grid while Knight and Kirby were 11th on row 6. Lewis and Wylie finished the 3-hour race 7th overall with Knight and Kirby finishing 9th.

For 2017, Team HARD made a quadruple car entry, in the Endurance category in Class 3, for the first round at Silverstone, with Simon Rudd and Tom Barley, Darron Lewis and Tom Knight, Angus Dudley and Callum Hawkins-Row and Toby Bearne and Daniel Wylie. At the end of the season, Lewis and Knight were 2nd in the Endurance championship, 19 points behind Witt Gamski and Ross Wylie, Rudd and Barley finished 3rd while Dudley and Hawkins-Row were further behind on points in 5th. In Class 3, Team HARD made it a 1-2-3 in the points standings.

In 2018, the first round at Rockingham saw Team HARD bring in three G55s in Class 3, to compete in the Endurance category, the duo of Simon Rudd and Tom Barley, Darron Lewis and Adam Hatfield and invitation entry of Graham Roberts and Ben Wallace. During the course of the season, there was only one driver change for Simon Rudd, Sam Randon in round 4 at Donington Park. Through the whole season, the car piloted by Hatfield and Lewis had multiple driver changes, in the form of Callum Hawkins-Row, Sam Randon, Angus Dudley, Nick Scott-Dickeson and Ryan Harper-Ellam. The driver changes meant varying positions where the car finished, but with only one non-finish. At the end of the season, Rudd and Barley finished 2nd in the Endurance championship standings overall 12 points behind Matt Greenwood and Sarah Moore, but were 1st in Class 3. The second of Team HARD's cars was 4th overall in the championship 8 points behind Mike McCollum and Sean Cooper and third in Class 3.

The team did not participate in the opening rounds of 2019, only confirming an entry at the end of the season, competing in the 'Into-the-Night' races at Brands Hatch with Nick Scott-Dickeson joined by Steve Chandler and Ben Clayden driving with ex-BTCC driver Michael Epps.

=== BTCC Cars ===
In 2017, Adam Hatfield drove an ex-BTCC Volkswagen Passat at Donington Park in round 5, he qualified 24th, finishing 15th in race one but retiring before completing the second 50-minute sprint race. Hatfield competed in the next round at Oulton Park in a Toyota Avensis. He qualified 15th on the grid, finishing the race in 10th place and 2nd in the Sprint category. In the 50-minute Sprint race he placed 5th overall. For the annual 'Into-the-Night' races at Brands Hatch, Jesse Chamberlain and Ben Wallace drove the Avensis, qualifying 23rd on the grid, finishing 14th overall in the first race and 4th overall in the Sprint race.

In 2018, Sam Randon and Michael Crees drove the Avensis again in the night races at Brands Hatch. They qualified 14th on the grid for the race, but retired from the first race due to mechanical issues. They managed to move up from the back of the grid and finished 3rd overall in the Endurance race.
