= Jack Goff =

British racing driver (born 1991)

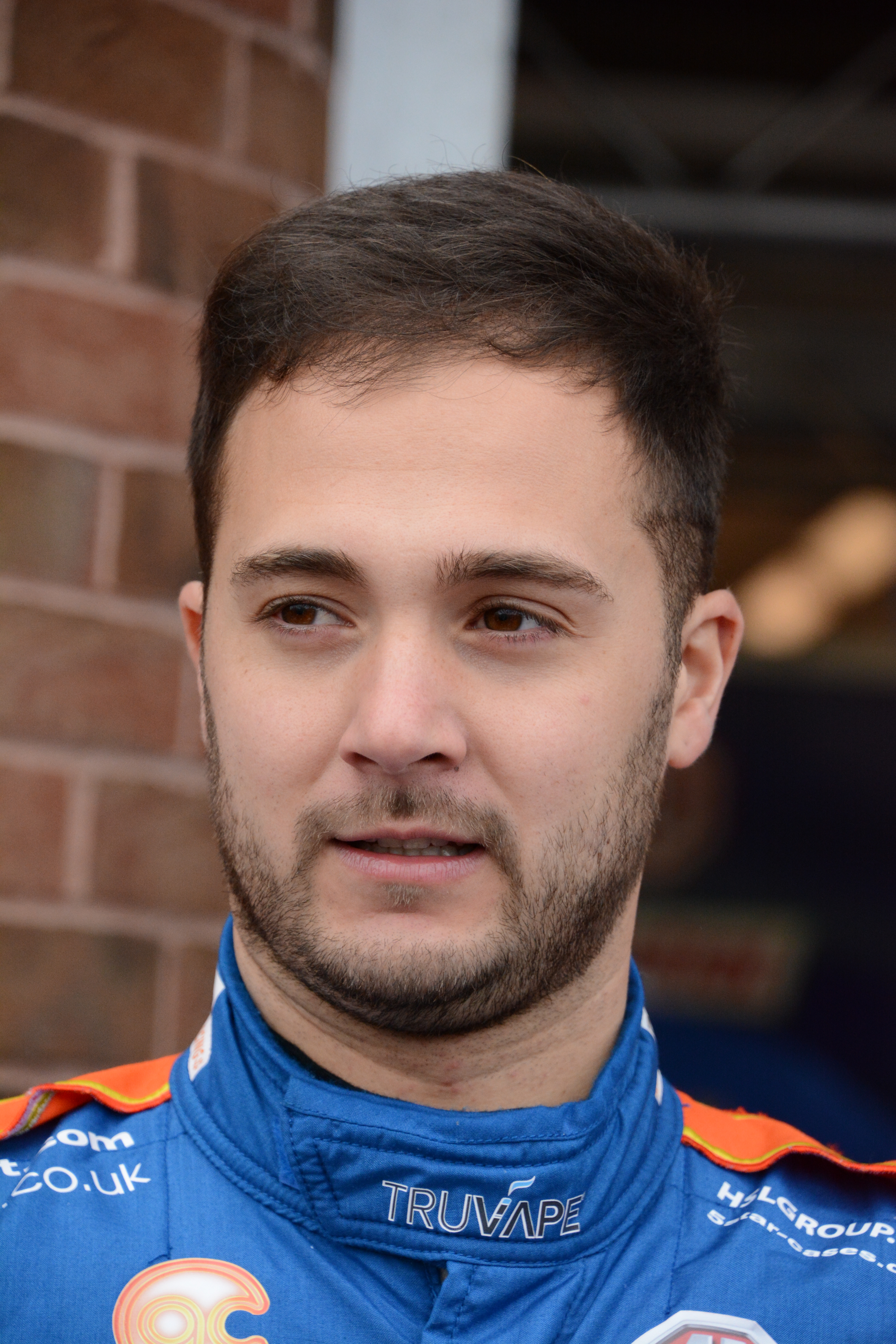
- Goff at Brands Hatch during the 2015 British Touring Car Championship season
- Nationality: (United Kingdom) British
- Born: Jack Alan Goff; 6 March 1991 (age 35) High Wycombe, England

British Touring Car Championship career
- Debut season: 2013
- Current team: Team HARD with Autobrite Direct
- Car number: 31
- Former teams: CHROME Edition Restart Racing, MG 5 Star Cases Racing, Team IHG Rewards Club
- Starts: 260
- Wins: 5
- Podiums: 20
- Poles: 6
- Fastest laps: 6
- Best finish: 6th in 2017

Previous series
- 2010–12 2009: Renault Clio Cup UK; MG Trophy Championship

Championship titles
- 2012: Renault Clio Cup UK

Jack Alan Goff (born 6 March 1991) is a British former racing driver. He was the 2012 Renault Clio Cup United Kingdom champion. He made his debut in the British Touring Car Championship on 31 March 2013 at Brands Hatch, driving for RCIB Insurance Racing. The 2017 and 2018 British Touring Car Championship seasons saw Jack driving for Eurotech Racing in a Honda Civic Type R.

== Personal life ==
Goff is of no relation to Ginetta Junior Championship driver Lewis Goff.

== Racing career ==
=== Renault Clio Cup UK ===
Goff joined the Renault Clio Cup United Kingdom championship for the 2010 season, securing a drive with Team Pyro after comparing well with race winner Dave Newsham in testing.

Goff remained in the championship in 2011. Goff stayed with the championship contenders for much of the season, and he took his maiden victory in the championship at Oulton Park. He later added a double win at Rockingham, but his results were not enough to mount a title challenge and he ended the season fifth in the championship, 52 points shy of fourth placed driver James Dixon.

Goff remained in the championship for 2012, finishing in the top five in the first eight races of the year, including wins at Brands Hatch and Donington Park. Goff was leading the title challenge at the halfway point of the season but his nearest rival Paul Rivett took four consecutive wins after the mid-season break, at Snetterton and Rockingham. Both endured a poor weekend at Silverstone meaning the title would be decided at Brands Hatch a fortnight later; with Rivett retiring in the first race, Goff took the title in the second race of the weekend by nine points.

=== British Touring Car Championship ===
==== RCIB Insurance Racing/CHROME Edition Restart Racing (2013–2014) ====
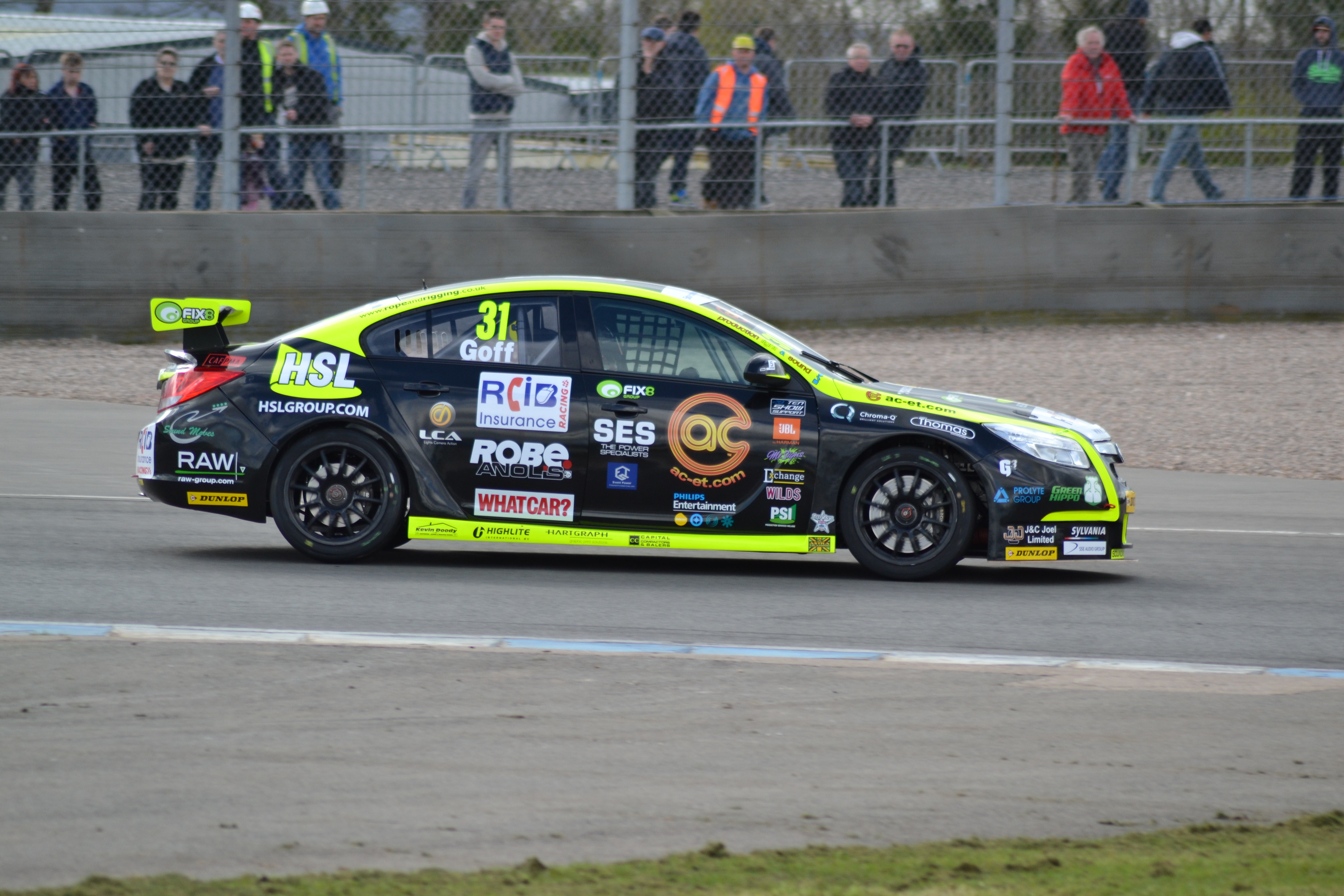
Goff driving the Team BMR Vauxhall Insignia at Donington Park during the 2014 British Touring Car Championship season.

On 19 December 2012, it was announced that Goff would drive an NGTC Vauxhall Insignia for Team HARD in the 2013 British Touring Car Championship season. This came just over a month after he tested the car at Silverstone. Two minutes into qualifying for the first round at Brands Hatch, he collided with Colin Turkington who had spun on the exit of Druids and was stationary on the racing line. He hadn't set a time and started at the back of the grid for the first race. Goff finished 17th in the Drivers Championship.

2014 arrived and Goff stayed with the Insignia for the first five rounds, however this time racing under the Team BMR outfit. Come round 6 at Snetterton, Goff swapped his Insignia for a VW CC Passat. Goff achieved ten top-ten finishes during the year and finished 14th in the Championship.

==== MG 5 Star Cases Racing (2015) ====
It was reported that Goff would be joining Triple Eight Racing for the 2015 British Touring Car Championship season alongside Andrew Jordan. This was the year when Goff got his first win in the BTCC in race 3 at Snetterton. This year, Goff also got 21 top-ten finishes and fiur podiums including his maiden victory. He finished ninth in the Championship overall.

==== Team IHG Rewards Club (2016) ====
It was confirmed that Goff would be joining West Surrey Racing and Team IHG Rewards Club for the 2016 British Touring Car Championship season and be driving a BMW 125i M Sport. The first event of the season at Brands Hatch went well for Goff as he came away with a podium in the last race of the day, finishing 3rd. Goff also had a good time at Knockhill in the first race, finishing second behind Jason Plato in the new Silverline Subaru. But as all drivers have bad weekends, Goff's came at Rockingham. The problems started in Qualifying for all three of the cars when rain got into the cars' system, with Jack qualifying 26th, and his teammates Rob Collard and Sam Tordoff finishing 27th and 28th respectively. Then on race day, Goff came from 26th on the grid to 12th in an outstanding drive. However, when it came to races 2 and 3, it was a disaster for him as he never finished either race. Goff finished 11th in the Championship overall.

==== Eurotech Racing (2017–2018) ====
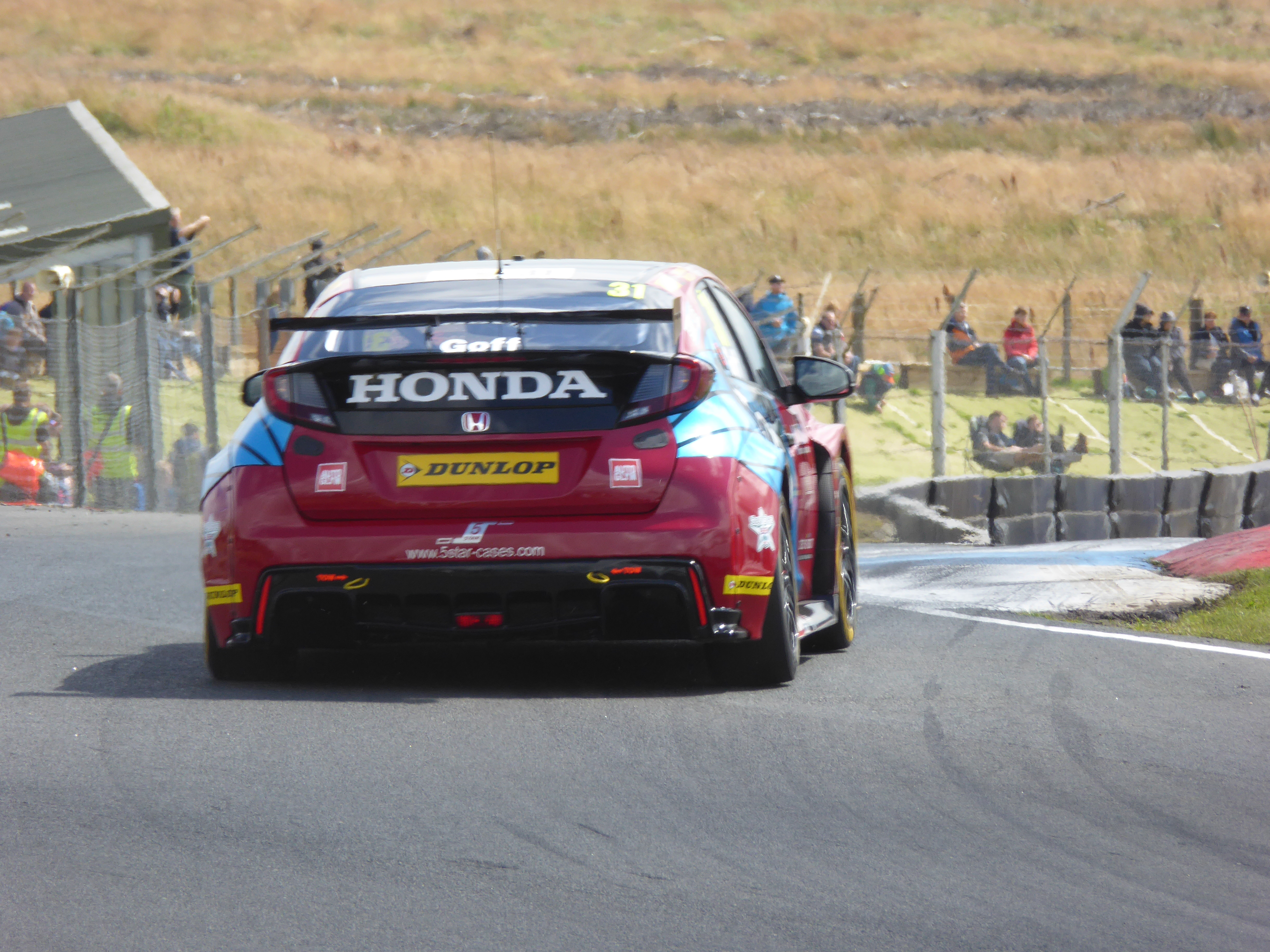
Goff, at the Knockhill round of the 2017 British Touring Car Championship.

It was confirmed that Goff would be joining Eurotech Racing for the 2017 British Touring Car Championship, driving a Honda Civic Type R.

It was confirmed on 9 January 2018 that Goff would be staying with Eurotech for the 2018 British Touring Car Championship, again driving a Honda Civic Type R; the first time that he had stayed with a team for a second full season in BTCC.

==== RCIB Insurance with Fox Transport (2019) ====
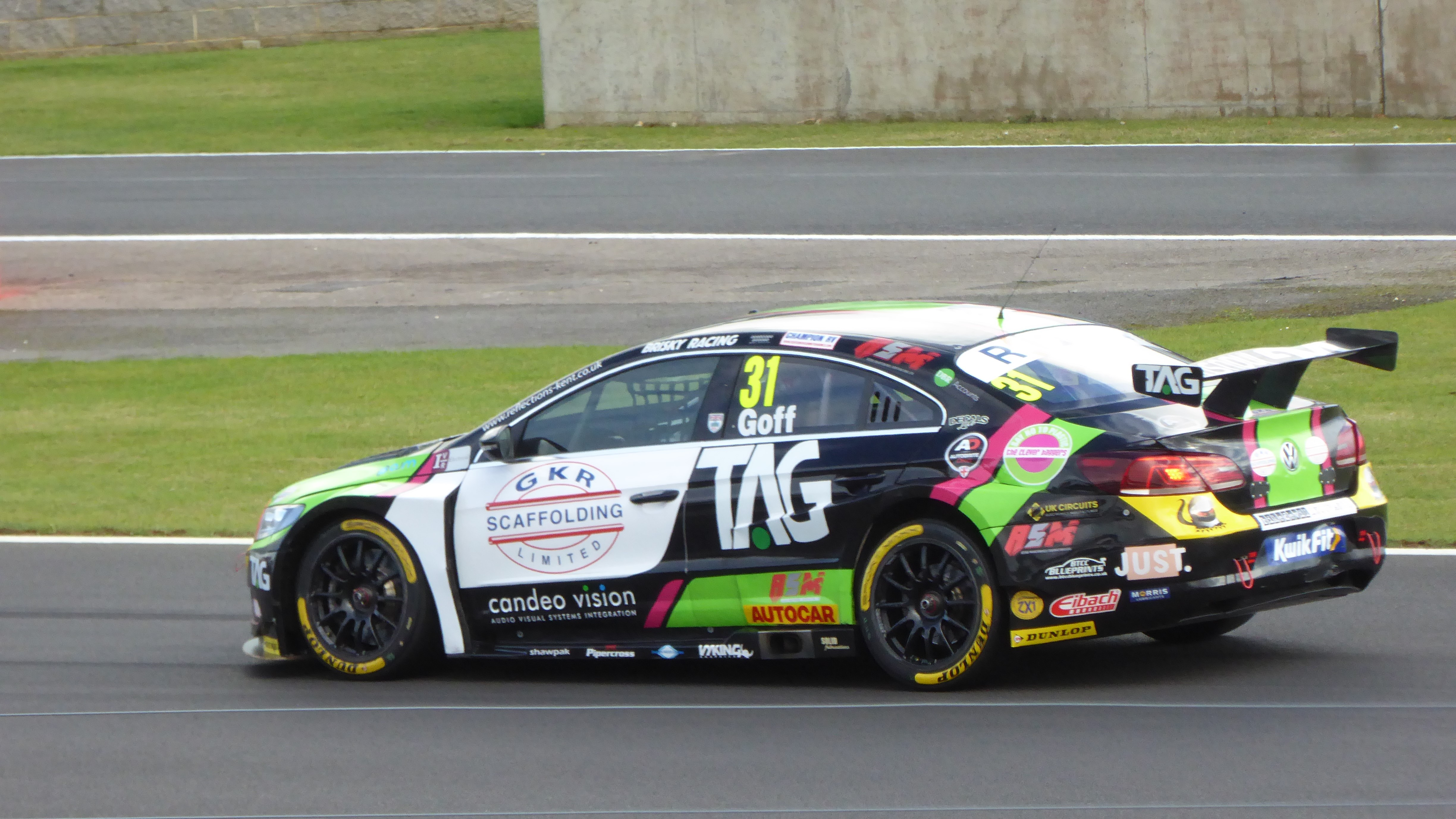
Goff at the Silverstone Circuit in 2019

Goff was almost without a racing seat for 2019, but had signed with Tony Gilham's RCIB Insurance Racing team at the last minute. The first half of his season only handed him a position outside the top-20 in the standings. After a tenth-place finish at Snetterton, his best that year, the next rounds at Thruxton and Knockhill provided no luck, but at Silverstone in the ninth round of the championship, strategy would give him one of the best finishes of his career. The weather had been on and off for the entire day, but in race three Goff made a last-minute dive into the pits to put on wet tyres, while teammate Boardley retired before the start. Goff started from the very back and made quick progress through the field of experienced drivers. Alongside Aiden Moffat, he stormed to the front of the field and lead the rest of the race to the chequered flag, giving Tony Gilham his team's first overall win.

== Racing record ==
=== Complete British Touring Car Championship results ===
(key) (Races in bold indicate pole position – 1 point awarded just in first race) (Races in italics indicate fastest lap – 1 point awarded all races) (* signifies that driver lead race for at least one lap – 1 point given all races)

Year	Team	Car	1	2	3	4	5	6	7	8	9	10	11	12	13	14	15	16	17	18	19	20	21	22	23	24	25	26	27	28	29	30	Pos	Points
2013	RCIB Insurance Racing	Vauxhall Insignia	BRH; 1; 13	BRH; 2 Ret	BRH; 3 NC	DON; 1; 18	DON; 2; 14	DON; 3; 16	THR; 1; 12	THR; 2; 9	**THR**; **3** Ret	OUL; 1; 16	OUL; 2 Ret	OUL; 3; 12	CRO; 1; 16	CRO; 2 NC	CRO; 3 Ret	SNE; 1; 11	SNE; 2 DNS	SNE; 3 Ret	KNO; 1	KNO; 2	KNO; 3	ROC; 1; 9	ROC; 2; 14	ROC; 3 Ret	SIL; 1 Ret	SIL; 2; 15	SIL; 3; 9	BRH; 1; 12	BRH; 2; 6	BRH; 3; 2	17th	73
2014	RCIB Insurance Racing	Vauxhall Insignia	BRH; 1; 12	BRH; 2; 14	BRH; 3; 8	DON; 1; 19	DON; 2; 11	DON; 3; 12	THR; 1; 11	THR; 2; 9	THR; 3; 5	OUL; 1; 16	OUL; 2; 13	OUL; 3 Ret	CRO; 1; 19	CRO; 2; 10	**CRO**; **3**; 6																14th	121
2014	CHROME Edition Restart Racing	Volkswagen CC																SNE; 1; 10	SNE; 2; 11	SNE; 3; 10	KNO; 1; 14	KNO; 2; 17	KNO; 3; 12	ROC; 1; 10	ROC; 2; 13	ROC; 3 Ret	SIL; 1; 11	SIL; 2; 14	SIL; 3; 10	BRH; 1 Ret	BRH; 2; 8	BRH; 3 Ret	14th	121
2015	MG 5 Star Cases Racing	MG 6 GT	BRH; 1; 4	BRH; 2; 9	BRH; 3; 2	DON; 1; 7	DON; 2; 8	DON; 3 Ret	THR; 1; 8	THR; 2; 4	THR; 3; 11	OUL; 1; 7	OUL; 2; 9	OUL; 3; 8	CRO; 1; 10	CRO; 2; 10	CRO; 3; 8	SNE; 1; 9	SNE; 2; 6	**SNE**; **3**; 1*	KNO; 1; 11	KNO; 2; 14	KNO; 3; 12	ROC; 1; 4	ROC; 2; 9	ROC; 3; 19	SIL; 1; 27	SIL; 2; 2	SIL; 3 NC	BRH; 1; 20	BRH; 2; 5	BRH; 3; 3	9th	233
2016	Team IHG Rewards Club	BMW 125i M Sport	BRH; 1; 10	BRH; 2; 7	BRH; 3; 3	DON; 1; 4	DON; 2; 5	DON; 3; 6	THR; 1; 8	THR; 2; 5	THR; 3; 18	OUL; 1; 12	OUL; 2; 9	OUL; 3 Ret	CRO; 1; 4	CRO; 2; 4	CRO; 3; 9	SNE; 1; 11	SNE; 2 Ret	SNE; 3; 13	KNO; 1; 2	KNO; 2; 7	KNO; 3; 10	ROC; 1; 12	ROC; 2 Ret	ROC; 3 Ret	SIL; 1; 12	SIL; 2; 13	SIL; 3; 11	BRH; 1; 13	BRH; 2; 20	BRH; 3; 13	11th	193
2017	Eurotech Racing	Honda Civic Type R	BRH; 1; 4	BRH; 2; 12	BRH; 3; 8	DON; 1; 12	DON; 2; 9	DON; 3; 6	THR; 1; 3	THR; 2; 4	THR; 3; 3	OUL; 1; 21	OUL; 2; 16	OUL; 3; 15	CRO; 1; 21	CRO; 2; 22	CRO; 3; 21	**SNE**; **1**; 2*	SNE; 2; 5	SNE; 3; 8	KNO; 1; 14	KNO; 2 Ret	KNO; 3; 16	ROC; 1; 3	ROC; 2; 5	ROC; 3; 4	**SIL**; **1**; 2	SIL; 2; 1*	SIL; 3; 9	**BRH**; **1**; 12	BRH; 2; 8	BRH; 3; 2	6th	244
2018	WIX Racing with Eurotech	Honda Civic Type R (FK2)	**BRH**; **1**; 1*	**BRH**; **2**; 10*	BRH; 3; 8	DON; 1; 13	DON; 2; 3	DON; 3; 23	THR; 1; 13	THR; 2; 8	THR; 3; 2	OUL; 1; 8	OUL; 2; 8	OUL; 3; 4	CRO; 1; 21	CRO; 2; 18	CRO; 3 Ret	**SNE**; **1**; 1*	**SNE**; **2**; 17	**SNE**; **3**; 2*	ROC; 1; 13	ROC; 2; 15	ROC; 3; 19	KNO; 1; 15	KNO; 2; 8	KNO; 3; 9	SIL; 1; 4	SIL; 2; 6	SIL; 3; 22	BRH; 1; 4	BRH; 2 Ret	BRH; 3; 18	8th	228
2019	RCIB Insurance with Fox Transport	Volkswagen CC	BRH; 1; 11	BRH; 2; 16	BRH; 3; 12	DON; 1; 15	DON; 2 NC	DON; 3 Ret	THR; 1; 21	THR; 2; 19	THR; 3 DNS	CRO; 1; 17	CRO; 2; 16	CRO; 3 Ret	OUL; 1; 14	OUL; 2 Ret	OUL; 3 DNS	SNE; 1; 18	SNE; 2 DNS	SNE; 3; 10	THR; 1; 24	THR; 2; 19	THR; 3; 18	KNO; 1; 19	KNO; 2 Ret	KNO; 3; 26	SIL; 1; 17	SIL; 2; 21	SIL; 3; 1*	BRH; 1; 9	BRH; 2 Ret	BRH; 3 DNS	21st	47
2020	RCIB Insurance with Fox Transport	Volkswagen CC	DON; 1; 18	DON; 2; 16	DON; 3 Ret	BRH; 1; 17	BRH; 2; 11	BRH; 3 Ret	OUL; 1 Ret	OUL; 2; 18	OUL; 3; 13	KNO; 1 Ret	KNO; 2; 19	KNO; 3; 21	THR; 1; 16	THR; 2; 15	THR; 3; 14	SIL; 1 Ret	SIL; 2; 19	SIL; 3; 16	CRO; 1; 17	CRO; 2; 18	CRO; 3; 18	SNE; 1; 18	SNE; 2 Ret	SNE; 3; 19	BRH; 1; 17	BRH; 2; 20	BRH; 3; 16				23rd	11
2021	Team HARD with Autobrite Direct	Cupra León	THR; 1; 13	THR; 2; 12	THR; 3; 8	SNE; 1; 12	SNE; 2; 9	SNE; 3; 9	BRH; 1; 10	BRH; 2; 11	BRH; 3; 2	OUL; 1; 10	OUL; 2 NC	OUL; 3; 16	KNO; 1; 16	KNO; 2; 12	KNO; 3; 26	THR; 1; 20	THR; 2; 16	THR; 3; 18	CRO; 1; 18	CRO; 2; 15	CRO; 3 Ret	SIL; 1; 19	SIL; 2; 15	SIL; 3; 15	DON; 1; 20	DON; 2; 15	DON; 3; 14	BRH; 1; 17	BRH; 2; 11	BRH; 3; 8	17th	90
