= Ryan Bensley =

British racing driver (born 1984)

- Bensley driving a Speedworks Motorsport Toyota Corolla at Silverstone Circuit in 2026
- Nationality: (United Kingdom) British
- Born: Ryan Thomas Bensley; 17 July 1984 (age 42) King's Lynn, England

British Touring Car Championship career
- Debut season: 2025
- Current team: Speedworks Corolla Racing
- Car number: 7
- Former teams: Team VERTU
- Starts: 21
- Wins: 0
- Podiums: 0
- Poles: 0
- Fastest laps: 0
- Best finish: 24th in 2026

Previous series
- 2024–2025 2020–2023 2009 2008: TCR UK; Civic Cup Championship; Sport Maxx Cup; Stock Hatch Championship

Championship titles
- 2008: Stock Hatch Championship

Ryan Thomas Bensley (born 17 July 1984) is a British racing driver and mortgage broker who competes in the British Touring Car Championship for Speedworks Corolla Racing.

Bensley won the 2008 750 Motor Club Classic Stock Hatch Championship, in his first year of car racing. During his early career, he raced against Lewis Hamilton.

== Personal life ==
Bensley's father, Steve "Beano" Bensley, served as one of his engineers during his four-year stint in the Civic Cup Championship.

Alongside his racing career, Bensley works as a director for Mortgage Synergy, a company he founded in late 2023.

== Racing career ==
In 2008, Bensley made his car racing debut in the 750 Motor Club Classic Stock Hatch Championship. In his maiden season in cars, Bensley clinched the series title ahead of Jeff Humphries. In 2009, Bensley moved over to the Sport Maxx Cup, only racing at the Snetterton finale for AmD SEAT Cupra, taking two wins and ending the season 12th overall.

Following an 11-year sabbatical from racing, Bensley competed in the Civic Cup Championship as a privateer in 2020. Spending four seasons in the series, Bensley was tenth overall for Concept Motorsport in 2021, ninth in 2022 for Zest Racecar Engineering and fourth the following year for Pro Alloys Racing.

In 2024, Bensley was set to join the TCR UK grid with Pro Alloys Racing, but after the team's withdrawal, he ended up racing at the Silverstone finale with Motion Motorsport. Continuing in the series for 2025, Bensley dabbled between Maximum Motorsport and Motion Motorsport, taking a best result of fifth with the former at Donington Park. During 2025, Bensley made his BTCC debut for Team VERTU in a cameo appearance at Snetterton.

After spending most of 2026 on the sidelines, Bensley returned to the BTCC grid, replacing Max Buxton at Speedworks Corolla Racing from Thruxton onwards. In his 12th career start at Donington Park, Bensley scored his maiden points by finishing 13th in race three at Donington Park. During 2026, Bensley also raced in the Citroën C1 Endurance Series, in which he won the Silverstone 24 Hours, as well as making a one-off appearance in the Britcar Endurance Series for Paul O'Neill's Project 29:7 Racing.

== Racing record ==
=== Career summary ===
Season	Series	Team	Races	Wins	Poles	F/Laps	Podiums	Points	Position
2008	750 Motor Club Classic Stock Hatch Championship	?	14	6	?	?	?	562	**1st**
2009	Sport Maxx Cup	AmD SEAT Cupra	3	2	1	1	3	?	12th
2020	Civic Cup Championship	Privateer	2	0	0	0	0	11	17th
2021	Civic Cup Championship	Concept Motorsport	13	0	0	0	0	111	10th
2022	Civic Cup Championship	Zest Racecar Engineering	16	0	0	1	1	112	9th
2023	Civic Cup Championship	Pro Alloys Racing	4	1	0	0	1	340	4th
2024	TCR UK Touring Car Championship	Motion Motorsport	3	0	0	0	0	26	22nd
2025	TCR UK Touring Car Championship	Maximum Motorsport with BSR	2	0	0	0	0	62	17th
2025	TCR UK Touring Car Championship	Motion Motorsport	3	0	0	0	0	62	17th
2025	C1 Endurance Series	WRC Developments with CB Autoservices	3	3	0	1	3		
2025	British Touring Car Championship	Team VERTU	3	0	0	0	0	0	29th
2026	British Touring Car Championship	Speedworks Corolla Racing	18	0	0	0	0	11	24th
2026	Britcar Endurance Championship – Trophy	Project 29:7 Racing	1	0	0	0	0	0†	NC†*

^{†} As Bensley was a guest driver, he was ineligible for points.

=== Complete TCR UK Touring Car Championship results ===
Year	Team	Car	1	2	3	4	5	6	7	8	9	10	11	12	13	14	15	16	17	18	19	20	DC	Points
2024	Motion Motorsport	Lynk & Co 03 TCR	BRH; 1	BRH; 2	BRH; 3	SNE; 1	SNE; 2	SNE; 3	OUL; 1	OUL; 2	CRO; 1	CRO; 1	CRO; 1	SIL; 1	SIL; 2	SIL; 3	THR; 1	THR; 2	THR; 3	SIL; 1; 5	SIL; 2 Ret	SIL; 3 DNS	22nd	26
2025	Maximum Motorsport with BSR	Lynk & Co 03 TCR	DON; 1	DON; 2	DON; 3	DON; 1; 5	DON; 2; 6																17th	62
2025	Motion Motorsport	Lynk & Co 03 TCR						SIL; 1 Ret	SIL; 2 Ret	SIL; 3; 10	CRO; 1	CRO; 2	CRO; 3	OUL; 1	OUL; 2	SNE; 1	SNE; 2	BRH; 1	BRH; 2				17th	62

=== Complete British Touring Car Championship results ===
(key)Races in bold indicate pole position (1 point awarded – 2002–2003 all races, 2004–present just in first race) Races in italics indicate fastest lap (1 point awarded all races) * signifies that driver lead race for at least one lap (1 point awarded – 2002 just in feature races, 2003–present all races; ^{Superscript} number indicates points-scoring qualifying race position)

Year	Team	Car	1	2	3	4	5	6	7	8	9	10	11	12	13	14	15	16	17	18	19	20	21	22	23	24	25	26	27	28	29	30	DC	Points
2025	Team VERTU	Hyundai i30 Fastback N Performance	DON; 1	DON; 2	DON; 3	BRH; 1	BRH; 2	BRH; 3	SNE; 1; 16	SNE; 2; 18	SNE; 3; 20	THR; 1	THR; 2	THR; 3	OUL; 1	OUL; 2	OUL; 3	CRO; 1	CRO; 2	CRO; 3	KNO; 1	KNO; 2	KNO; 3	DON; 1	DON; 2	DON; 3	SIL; 1	SIL; 2	SIL; 3	BRH; 1	BRH; 2	BRH; 3	29th	0
2026	Speedworks Corolla Racing	Toyota Corolla GR Sport	DON; 1	DON; 2	DON; 3	BRH; 1	BRH; 2	BRH; 3	SNE; 1	SNE; 2	SNE; 3	OUL; 1	OUL; 2	OUL; 3	THR; 1; 19	THR; 2; 19	THR; 3 Ret	KNO; 1; 19	KNO; 2; 16	KNO; 3; 19	DON; 1; 19	DON; 2; 16	DON; 3; 13	CRO; 1; 19	CRO; 2; 20	CRO; 3; 10	SIL; 1; 16	SIL; 2; 19	SIL; 3; 18	BRH; 1; 17	BRH; 2; 20	BRH; 3; 14	24th	11

=== Complete Britcar Endurance Series results ===
Year	Team	Car	1	2	3	4	5	6	7	8	9	10	DC	Points
2026	Project 29:7 Racing	Ginetta G56 GTA	DON	OUL	SPA; 1	SPA; 2	SNE; 17	DON	SNE	SIL	BRH; 1	BRH; 2	NC†*	0†*
