= Daryl De Leon =

Filipino-British racing driver (born 2005)

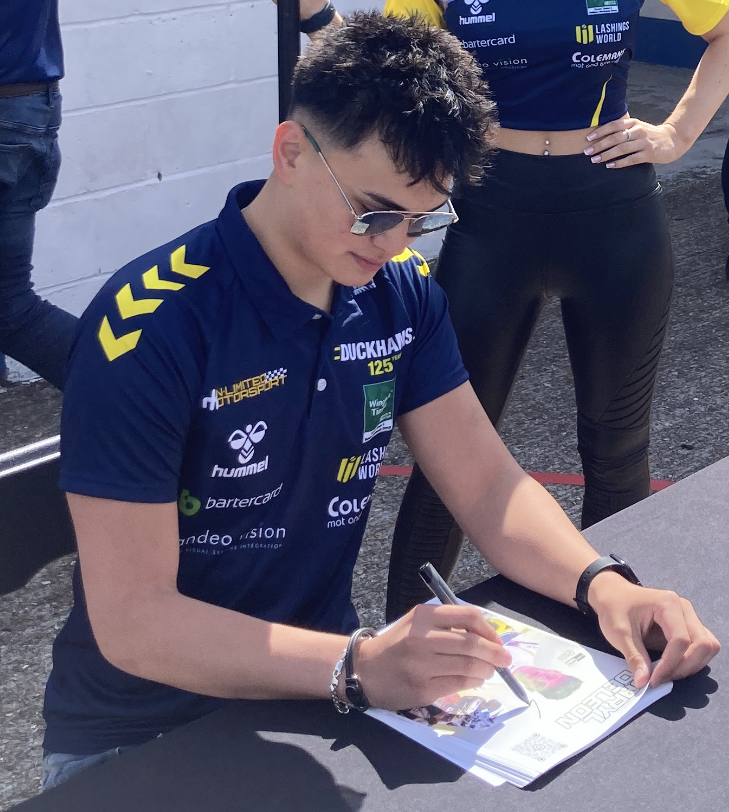
- De Leon at Thruxton Circuit in 2024
- Nationality: Filipino; British via dual nationality
- Born: Daryl De Leon Taylor; 2 August 2005 (age 21) Drogheda, Ireland

British Touring Car Championship career
- Debut season: 2023
- Current team: WSR
- Car number: 2
- Former teams: Re. Beverages and Bartercard with Team HARD., Duckhams Racing with Un-Limited Motorsport
- Starts: 104 (105 entries)
- Wins: 1
- Podiums: 5
- Poles: 2
- Fastest laps: 0
- Best finish: 12th in 2026

Previous series
- 2022 2022: Radical SR1 Cup; GB4 Championship

Championship titles
- 2025 2023 2023 2022: Jack Sears Trophy; BEC; BEC - Class C Radical SR1 Cup

Daryl De Leon (Note: De Leon raced as Daryl DeLeon up until the end of 2025.) Taylor (born 2 August 2005) is a Filipino-British racing driver currently competing in the British Touring Car Championship for WSR. He is a race winner in both Radical Cup UK, the British Endurance Championship, and British Touring Car Championship where he made his debut in 2023 with Team HARD.

De Leon scored his first BTCC win in 2025, winning Race 2 on the Brands Hatch Indy Circuit, driving a WSR BMW 330i M Sport. He went on to win the Jack Sears Trophy, narrowly beating teammate Charles Rainford.

== Personal life ==
De Leon is dating Wera Alliance Racing Academy driver Liona Theobald, who currently competes in the Mini Challenge Trophy.

== Career ==
=== Radical Cup ===
De Leon made his car racing debut in the Radical SR1 Cup in the penultimate round of the 2021, and won two of the three races in the final round of the season. He then competed in the 2021 Radical Intercontinental Cup at the Algarve International Circuit in Portugal.

Competing full-time in the 2022 season with Valour Racing, De Leon won the championship. Later in the year, he contested the inaugural Radical Cup World Finals at the Spring Mountain Motorsports Ranch in Nevada, United States, which he won overall.

In 2023, De Leon moved up to the SR3 category of the Radical Cup UK, alongside his British Endurance Championship commitments.

=== GB4 Championship ===
De Leon raced for Valour Racing in the fourth round of the 2022 GB4 Championship. He finished third in his debut race, but did not contest any other rounds during the season, and finished 25th in the championship.

=== British Endurance Championship ===
De Leon won the 2023 Team HARD Scholarship, enabling him to compete in the 2023 British Endurance Championship with Team HARD, driving an Audi S3 touring car alongside Maurice Henry. Prior to the second round, De Leon switched to a Porsche 991 GT3 Cup.

=== British Touring Car Championship ===
De Leon driving for West Surrey Racing at Silverstone Circuit in 2026

As part of the Team HARD Scholarship, De Leon became a development driver for their BTCC team for the 2023 season. On 4 July, he drove for the team in the official Goodyear Tyre Test Following the departure of Jade Edwards from Team HARD after the fifth round of 2023, it was announced that De Leon would take her place.

For 2024, De Leon would remain with Duckhams Racing, but the team under the shell would be Un-Limited Motorsport, who ran a single Cupra León for the Filipino driver.

De Leon would move from the Un-Limited Motorsport Cupra León to a household name in West Surrey Racing and their BMW 330i M Sport LCI for 2025, partnering reigning champion Jake Hill, Aiden Moffat and rookie Charles Rainford. De Leon, Rainford and NAPA driver Sam Osborne would fight for the Jack Sears Trophy all season long, but ultimately De Leon would win, taking 2 outright pole positions at Silverstone and Brands Hatch GP.

De Leon and Rainford would be the only drivers of a downgraded 2-car team for WSR in 2026, and the team became an Independent for the first time in over 10 years. Lewis Gilbert would jump from GB3 to partner he and Rainford from Thruxton.

== Racing record ==
=== Karting career summary ===
Season	Series	Team	Position
2021	IAME Euro Series - X30 Senior	KR Sport	39th
2021	IAME Warriors Finale B - X30 Senior	KR Sport	9th
2021	British Kart Championship - X30 Senior	KR Sport	12th

=== Racing career summary ===
Season	Series	Team	Races	Wins	Poles	F/Laps	Podiums	Points	Position
2021	Radical SR1 Cup	Valour Racing	5	1	0	3	1	?	?
2021	Radical Intercontinental Cup	Valour Racing	?	?	?	?	?	?	?
2022	GB4 Championship	Valour Racing	3	0	0	0	1	44	15th
2022	Radical SR1 Cup	Valour Racing	13	7	9	7	9	?	**1st**
2022	Radical World Finals	Valour Racing	4	3	1	2	?	N/A	**1st**
2022	TGR Vios Cup Philippines - Super Sporting	Toyota Marilao-Obengers Racing	6	0	0	0	2	30	7th
2023	Radical Cup UK - SR3 Pro	Valour Racing	12	4	0	5	11	595	**1st***
2023	British Endurance Championship	Team HARD Racing (Note: DeLeon competed in the no. 34 car for Team HARD in round 1, he competed in the no. 28 car from round 2 onwards.)	1	0	1	0	1	114.5	**2nd***‡
2023	British Endurance Championship	Team HARD Racing	5	4	2	3	5	179	**1st***‡
2023	Britcar 6 Hours - Class 5	Racing Car Experiences	1	0	0	0	0	N/A	5th
2023	British Touring Car Championship	Re.Beverages and Bartercard with Team HARD.	15	0	0	0	0	6	25th
2024	British Touring Car Championship	Duckhams Racing With Bartercard	30	0	0	0	0	48	18th
2025	British Touring Car Championship	West Surrey Racing	29	1	2	0	2	149	13th
2026	British Touring Car Championship	WSR	30	0	0	0	3	240	12th
2026	GT World Challenge Europe Endurance Cup	Paradine Competition	1	0	0	0	0	0	NC

‡ Team standings.

=== Complete Radical SR1 Cup results ===
(key) (Races in bold indicate pole position) (Races in italics indicate fastest lap)

Year	Team	1	2	3	4	5	6	7	8	9	10	11	12	13	DC	Points
2021		SNE1; 1	SNE1; 2	BRH; 1	BRH; 2	SNE2; 1	SNE2; 2	SIL; 1; 4‡	SIL; 2; 4‡	SIL; 3; 5‡	DON; 1 Ret	DON; 2; 1			?	?
2022	Valour Racing	DON1; 1; 6	DON1; 2; 1	**BRH**; **1**; **1**	**BRH**; **2**; **10**	**SNE**; **1**; **1**	**SNE**; **2**; **1**	**SIL**; **1**; **1‡**	**SIL**; **2**; **1‡**	**SIL**; **3**; **5‡**	OUL; 1; 2	OUL; 2; 1	**DON2**; **1**; **Ret**	**DON2**; **2**; **2**	1st	?

‡ Class position.

=== Complete GB4 Championship results ===
(key) (Races in bold indicate pole position) (Races in italics indicate fastest lap)

Year	Entrant	1	2	3	4	5	6	7	8	9	10	11	12	13	14	15	16	17	18	19	20	21	22	23	24	DC	Points
2022	Valour Racing	SNE1; 1	SNE1; 2	SNE1; 3	OUL; 1	OUL; 2	OUL; 3	SIL1; 1	SIL1; 2	SIL1; 3	DON1; 1; 3	DON1; 2; 8	DON1; 3; 9	SNE2; 1	SNE2; 2	SNE2; 3	SIL2; 1	SIL2; 2	SIL2; 3	BRH; 1	BRH; 2	BRH; 3	DON2; 1	DON2; 2	DON2; 3	15th	44

=== Complete British Endurance Championship results ===
(key) (Races in bold indicate pole position in class – 1 point awarded just in first race; races in italics indicate fastest lap in class – 1 point awarded all races;-

Year	Team	Car	Class	1	2	3	4	5	6	DC	CP	Points
2023	Team HARD.	Audi S3 Saloon	**C**	**SIL1**; 18						8th‡	2nd‡	114.5‡
2023	Team HARD.	Porsche 991 GT3 Cup I	**C**		BRH; 2	**OUL**; 4	**SIL2**; 3	SNE; 7	DON; 10	1st‡	1st‡	179‡

^{*}Season still in progress. ‡ Team standings.

=== Complete British Touring Car Championship results ===
(key) Races in bold indicate pole position (1 point awarded – 2002–2003 all races, 2004–present just in first race) Races in italics indicate fastest lap (1 point awarded all races) * signifies that driver lead race for at least one lap (1 point awarded – 2002 just in feature races, 2003–present all races; ^{Superscript} number indicates points-scoring qualifying race position)

Year	Team	Car	1	2	3	4	5	6	7	8	9	10	11	12	13	14	15	16	17	18	19	20	21	22	23	24	25	26	27	28	29	30	DC	Points
2023	Re.Beverages and Bartercard with Team HARD.	Cupra León	DON; 1	DON; 2	DON; 3	BRH; 1	BRH; 2	BRH; 3	SNE; 1	SNE; 2	SNE; 3	THR; 1	THR; 2	THR; 3	OUL; 1	OUL; 2	OUL; 3	CRO; 1; 23	CRO; 2; 21	CRO; 3; 18	KNO; 1 Ret	KNO; 2; 22	KNO; 3 Ret	DON; 1; 22	DON; 2 Ret	DON; 3 Ret	SIL; 1; 14	SIL; 2; 26	SIL; 3; 21	BRH; 1; 21	BRH; 2 Ret	BRH; 3; 12	25th	6
2024	Duckhams Racing with Un-Limited Motorsport	Cupra León	DON; 1; 13	DON; 2; 15	DON; 3 Ret	BRH; 1 NC	BRH; 2; 14	BRH; 3; 19	SNE; 1; 17	SNE; 2; 10	SNE; 3; 12	THR; 1; 18	THR; 2; 17	THR; 3 NC	OUL; 1; 18	OUL; 2; 12	OUL; 3; 13	CRO; 1; 18	CRO; 2; 14	CRO; 3; 17	KNO; 1; 15	KNO; 2; 16	KNO; 3 DSQ	DON; 1; 17	DON; 2; 17	DON; 3; 9	SIL; 1; 18	SIL; 2; 19	SIL; 3; 13	BRH; 1; 7	BRH; 2; 13	BRH; 3; 17	18th	48
2025	West Surrey Racing	BMW 330i M Sport LCI	DON; 1; 15	DON; 2; 12	DON; 3; 15	BRH; 1; 7	BRH; 2; 1*	BRH; 3; 13	SNE; 1; 10	SNE; 2; 15	SNE; 3; 19	THR; 1; 10	THR; 2; 9	THR; 3; 14	OUL; 1; 18	OUL; 2; 15	OUL; 3; 14	CRO; 1; 6	CRO; 2; 3	CRO; 3 Ret	KNO; 1; 8*	KNO; 2; 6	**KNO**; **3** Ret*	DON; 1; 11	DON; 2; 5	DON; 3; 9	**SIL**; **1**; 13	SIL; 2; 10	SIL; 3; 20	**BRH**; **1** DNS	BRH; 2; 13	BRH; 3; 13	13th	149
2026	WSR	BMW 330i M Sport LCI	DON; 1; 12	DON; 2; 5	DON; 3; 13	BRH; 1; 11^{2}	BRH; 2; 10	BRH; 3; 4	SNE; 1; 3^{6}	SNE; 2; 10	SNE; 3; 3	OUL; 1; 10^{15}	OUL; 2; 4	OUL; 3; 15	THR; 1; 12^{15}	THR; 2; 14	THR; 3; 12	KNO; 1; 11^{6}	KNO; 2; 17	KNO; 3; 6	DON; 1; 15	DON; 2; 11	DON; 3; 3	CRO; 1; 20^{4}	CRO; 2; 13	CRO; 3; 13	SIL; 1; 5^{4}	SIL; 2; 4*	SIL; 3; 11	BRH; 1; 7^{6}	BRH; 2; 5	BRH; 3; 17	12th	240

== Notes ==
Sporting positions
Preceded by Mikey Doble	Jack Sears Trophy; Winner; 2025	Succeeded by Dexter Patterson
