= 2025 Britcar Endurance Championship =

British endurance racing season

The 2025 Britcar Endurance Championship was a motor racing championship held across England. It was the 24th season of a Britcar championship and the 11th run as the Britcar Endurance Championship. Following the 2024 season, the organisers announced that the British Endurance Championship (BEC) and Britcar Trophy Championship would form together to create one single Championship for the 2025 season.

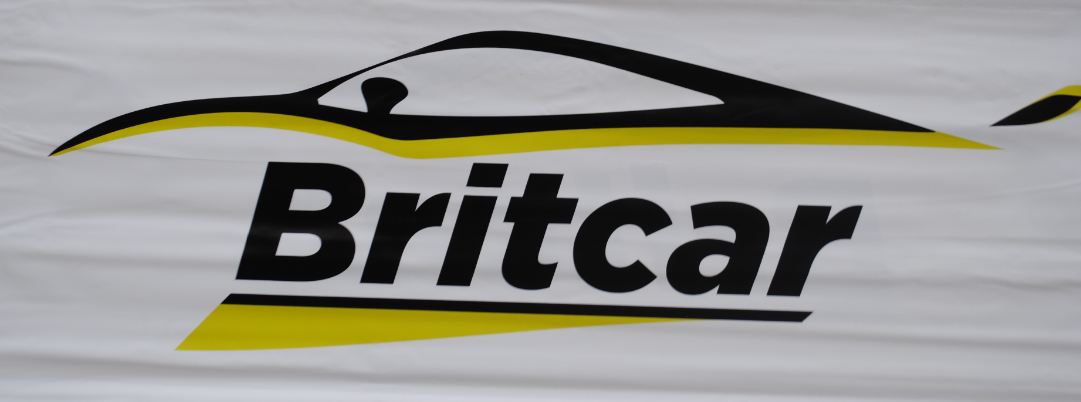
Britcar Logo

The series was associated with the BARC and raced at BARC organised events, with the exception of Round 2 at Silverstone Grand Prix Layout, which was organised by the BRSCC.

== Calendar ==
The Series has a mixture of 2x 45 Minute races, or 1x 90 Minute race per weekend. Races between 30 and 60 minutes have 1 mandatory pitstop which has to be completed, and races between 60 minutes and 120 minutes have 2 mandatory pitstops which must be completed.

Round		Circuit	Length	Date
1	1	Silverstone International, Northamptonshire	45 min	5 April
1	2	Silverstone International, Northamptonshire	45 min	5 April
2	3	Silverstone Grand Prix Circuit, Northamptonshire	90 min	3 May
3	4	Snetterton Circuit (300), Norfolk	45 min	31 May
3	5	Snetterton Circuit (300), Norfolk	45 min	31 May
4	6	Thruxton Circuit, Hampshire	45 min	5 July
4	7	Thruxton Circuit, Hampshire	45 min	5 July
5	8	Donington Park National Circuit, Leicestershire	90 min	9 August
6	9	Snetterton Circuit (300), Norfolk	90 min	13 September
7	10	Oulton Park, Cheshire	90 min	13 September
8	11	Brands Hatch Indy Circuit (Night Race), Kent	45 min	8 November
8	12	Brands Hatch Indy Circuit (Night Race), Kent	45 min	8 November

== Teams and drivers ==
The Championship includes multiple classes, Classes can be identified through the colour of the sun strip on the windscreen:

- Class Challenge for Porsche 991 Cup Cars, Ferrari 458 and 488 Challenge Cars. (Red Sun strip)
- Class GT for cars originally built to GT4 regulations. (Blue Sun Strip)
- Class Ginetta for Ginetta G55 Supercup Cars. Orange Sun Strip)
- Class Trophy for cars meeting a maximum Power to Weight Ratio of 310bhp/tonne. (Green Sun Strip)
- Class Cup for cars meeting a maximum Power to Weight Ratio of 280bhp/tonne. (Yellow Sun Strip)
- Class TCR for cars originally built to TCR regulations. (Black Sun Strip)

The regulations state that all classes must use Goodyear racing slick and wet tyres only, with the exception of the Cup class, which uses Dunlop Direzza slick and Goodyear wet tyres.

All teams are British-registered.

Team	Car	No.	Drivers	Rounds
Challenge
Toro Verde GT	Porsche 991.2 GT3 Cup	8	(United Kingdom) Steve Gambrell	1–4
Toro Verde GT	Porsche 991.2 GT3 Cup	8	(United Kingdom) Daniel Lloyd	1–2, 4
FF Corse & Red River Sport	Ferrari 488 Challenge Evo 4 Ferrari 458 Challenge Evo 1	16	(United Kingdom) Bonamy Grimes	1–4, 8
FF Corse & Red River Sport	Ferrari 488 Challenge Evo 4 Ferrari 458 Challenge Evo 1	16	(United Kingdom) Johnny Mowlem	1–4, 8
Amspeed	Porsche 991.2 GT3 Cup	18	(United Kingdom) Ash Muldoon	1–2, 4–5, 8
Amspeed	Porsche 991.2 GT3 Cup	18	(United Kingdom) James Kellett	2, 4–5, 8
Amspeed	BMW M3 E36	36	(United Kingdom) Karl Jones	8
Amspeed	BMW M3 E36	36	(United Kingdom) Mark Smith	8
Amspeed	Porsche 991.1 GT3 Cup	74	(United Kingdom) Dominic Malone	All
Amspeed	Porsche 991.1 GT3 Cup	74	(United Kingdom) Adam Smalley	1, 4–6, 8
Amspeed	Porsche 991.1 GT3 Cup	74	(United Kingdom) Dan Cammish	2
Amspeed	Porsche 991.1 GT3 Cup	74	(United Kingdom) Charles Rainford	7
Steer Group	Ferrari 488 Challenge	21	(United Kingdom) Andy Christopher	2
SG Racing	Porsche 991.2 GT3 Cup	32	(United Kingdom) Mark Cunningham	1–2, 4, 6
SG Racing	Porsche 991.2 GT3 Cup	32	(United Kingdom) Peter Cunningham	1–2, 4, 6
Mtech	Ferrari 488 Challenge Evo	55	(United Kingdom) John Seale	1
Mtech	Ferrari 488 Challenge Evo	55	(United Kingdom) Jamie Stanley	1
Innovation Racing	Ginetta G56 GT4 Evo	37	(Greece) Mike Chalkiopolous	5
Innovation Racing	Ginetta G56 GT4 Evo	37	(United Kingdom) Simon Griffiths	5
Challenge Invitation
Innovation Racing	Ginetta G56 GT4 Evo	41	(United Kingdom) Luke Bennett	8
Innovation Racing	Ginetta G56 GT4 Evo	41	(United Kingdom) Daniel Wyile	8
GT
Octane Sports	Audi R8 LMS GT4 Evo	2	(United Kingdom) Will Powell	1
Octane Sports	Audi R8 LMS GT4 Evo	2	(United Kingdom) Dave Scaramanga	1
Woodrow Motorsport	BMW M3 GTR	23	(United Kingdom) Nathan Wells	4–5, 7–8
Amspeed	BMW M3 E36	36	(United Kingdom) Mark Smith	3
Amspeed	BMW M3 E36	36	(United Kingdom) Colin Turkington	3
Suitsme powered by Amspeed	BMW M3 E46	73	(United Kingdom) Jack Layton	5, 7
Suitsme powered by Amspeed	BMW M3 E46	73	(United Kingdom) Matthew Sanders	5, 7
Team BRIT	McLaren 570S GT4	38	(United Kingdom) Noah Cosby	1–7
Team BRIT	McLaren 570S GT4	38	(United Kingdom) Caleb McDuff	1–5, 7
Team BRIT	McLaren 570S GT4	38	(United Kingdom) Aaron Morgan	6
Team BRIT	McLaren 570S GT4	68	(United Kingdom) Paul Fullick	1–3, 5–7
Team BRIT	McLaren 570S GT4	68	(United Kingdom) Aaron Morgan	1–3, 5, 7
Team BRIT	McLaren 570S GT4	68	(Japan) Takuma Aoki	6
Derek McMahon Racing	Alfa Romeo Giulia Quadrifoglio	57	(Republic of Ireland) Barry McMahon	1–2, 8
Derek McMahon Racing	Alfa Romeo Giulia Quadrifoglio	57	(United Kingdom) Paul Plant	8
Raceworks Motorsport	Ginetta G55 GT4	63	(United Kingdom) Chris Bingham	All
Raceworks Motorsport	Ginetta G55 GT4	63	(United Kingdom) Michael Lyons	2, 5–7
SGM Motorsport	BMW M3 E46	147	(United Kingdom) David Fielder	2–4, 6
Addison Racing	Aston Martin Vantage GT4	189	(United Kingdom) Martin Addison	1–5
Addison Racing	Aston Martin AMR Vantage GT4	189	(United Kingdom) Martin Addison	6–8
GT Invitation
Geoff Steel Racing	BMW M2	2	(United Kingdom) Peter Moulsdale	7
Barton Racing by Geoff Steel Racing	BMW M3 E46	11	(United Kingdom) Harry Barton	1–3, 5, 7
Fox Transport	McLaren 570S GT4	24	(United Kingdom) Michael Wheeler	8
Fox Transport	McLaren 570S GT4	24	(United Kingdom) Richard Wheeler	8
Innovation Racing	Ginetta G55 GT4	26	(United Kingdom) Sevin Christian	8
Innovation Racing	Ginetta G55 GT4	26	(United Kingdom) Simon Griffiths	8
Ginetta
Datum Motorsport	Ginetta G55 Supercup	3	(United Kingdom) Nick Casey	1–5, 8
Datum Motorsport	Ginetta G55 Supercup	3	(Brazil) Adriano Mederios	1–2, 8
Datum Motorsport	Ginetta G55 Supercup	47	(Italy) Marco Anastasi	All
Datum Motorsport	Ginetta G55 Supercup	47	(Italy) Maurizio Sciglio	All
118 Service by Datum	Ginetta G55 Supercup	110 1; 118 5	(United Kingdom) Dave May	3–8
118 Service by Datum	Ginetta G55 Supercup	110 1; 118 5	(United Kingdom) Mark Skeats	3–8
Morris Motorsport	Ginetta G55 Supercup	31	(United Kingdom) Dan Morris	2, 6
Morris Motorsport	Ginetta G55 Supercup	31	(United Kingdom) Colin White	2, 6
SGM Motorsport	Ginetta G55 Supercup	43	(United Kingdom) Stephen Fresle	1–2, 5
SGM Motorsport	Ginetta G55 Supercup	43	(United Kingdom) Simon Green	1
SGM Motorsport	Ginetta G55 Supercup	43	(United Kingdom) Jack Mitchell	2, 5
JWA Racing	Ginetta G55 Supercup	55	(United Kingdom) Andy Cummings	7
JWA Racing	Ginetta G55 Supercup	55	(United Kingdom) David Ward	7
Ginetta Invitation
Hills Motorsport	Ginetta G55 Supercup	82	(United Kingdom) Aiden Hills	8
Hills Motorsport	Ginetta G55 Supercup	82	(United Kingdom) Michael Knibbs	8
Trophy
Woodrow Motorsport	BMW M3 E46	10	(United Kingdom) Calum Bates	All
Woodrow Motorsport	BMW M3 E36	721	(United Kingdom) Chris Murphy	All
RaceCar Consultants	Ginetta G56 GTA	22	(United Kingdom) Elliot Wilson	1–6, 8
RaceCar Consultants	Ginetta G56 GTA	22	(United Kingdom) Ian Wilson	1–6, 8
MacG Racing	Mazda RX-8	33	(United Kingdom) Jonny MacGregor	1–6
MacG Racing	Mazda RX-8	33	(United Kingdom) Josh Tomlinson	2–6
Intersport Racing	BMW M3 F80 4 BMW M3 E36 1	40	(United Kingdom) Bryan Bransom	1–2
Intersport Racing	BMW M3 F80 4 BMW M3 E36 1	40	(United Kingdom) Jasver Sapra	1–2
SGM Motorsport	BMW M3 F80 4 BMW M3 E36 1	40	(United Kingdom) Bryan Bransom	3, 5, 8
SGM Motorsport	BMW M3 F80 4 BMW M3 E36 1	40	(United Kingdom) Jasver Sapra	3, 5, 8
Vortice Motorsport	Ginetta G56 GTA	42	(United Kingdom) Archie Buttle	6–8
Vortice Motorsport	Ginetta G56 GTA	42	(United Kingdom) Freddie Ingram	8
High Row Motorsport	Ginetta G56 GTA	62	(United Kingdom) James Harrison	1–5, 7–8
High Row Motorsport	Ginetta G56 GTA	62	(United Kingdom) Steve Harrison	1–5, 7–8
Geoff Steel Racing	BMW M2	70	(United Kingdom) Lee Goldsmith	1–3, 5–7
Geoff Steel Racing	BMW M2	70	(Australia) Bart Horsten	2
Geoff Steel Racing	BMW M2	70	(United Kingdom) Gustav Burton	5–6
TSR Performance	Audi TT	77	(United Kingdom) Craig Fleming	6
TSR Performance	Audi TT	77	(United Kingdom) Mark Jones	6
Mauger Motorsport	Cupra León TCR	118	(United Kingdom) Simon Mauger	1
SVG Motorsport	Ginetta G56 GTA	162	(United Kingdom) Alex Turnbull	1–3, 5
SVG Motorsport	Ginetta G56 GTA	162	(United Kingdom) Alex Toth-Jones	2, 5
Brookspeed with UBIQ	BMW M2CSR	888	(United Kingdom) Andrew Dawber	1, 3–4, 6, 8
Brookspeed with UBIQ	BMW M2CSR	888	(United Kingdom) Nathan Wright	1, 3–4, 6, 8
Trophy Invitation
JLC Group Motorsport	Cupra León TCR	14	(United Kingdom) Daniel Lloyd	8
JLC Group Motorsport	Cupra León TCR	14	(United Kingdom) Alex Read	8
SGM Motorsport	Ginetta G56 GTA	43	(United Kingdom) Stephen Fresle	8
SGM Motorsport	Ginetta G56 GTA	43	(United Kingdom) Jack Mitchell	8
Project 297 Racing	Ginetta G56 GTA	297	(United Kingdom) Carl Garnett	8
Project 297 Racing	Ginetta G56 GTA	297	(United Kingdom) Darron Lewis	8
Cup
Team BRIT	BMW M240i	4	(United Kingdom) Asha Silva	All
Team BRIT	BMW M240i	4	(United Kingdom) Bobby Trundley	All
Team BRIT	Honda Civic	45	(United Kingdom) Alistair Camp	6
EDF Motorsports	BMW M3 E46	34	(United Kingdom) Martin Byford	2
EDF Motorsports	BMW M3 E46	34	(United Kingdom) David Farrow	2
TSR Performance	Audi TT	77	(United Kingdom) Mark Jones	1, 4–5, 8
TSR Performance	Audi TT	77	(United Kingdom) Craig Fleming	4, 8
TSR Performance	Audi TT	77	(United Kingdom) Marc Kemp	5
Radmore Racing	Ginetta G40	78	(United Kingdom) Matt Rainbow	5
No Pressure Racing	BMW 130	79	(United Kingdom) Alan McCullough	1–3, 7
No Pressure Racing	BMW 130	79	(United Kingdom) Dennis Storey	1–3, 7
JLC Group Motorsport	SEAT León Supercopa	114	(United Kingdom) Chris Hayes	All
JLC Group Motorsport	SEAT León Supercopa	114	(United Kingdom) Simon Mauger	2
JLC Group Motorsport	SEAT León Supercopa	114	(United Kingdom) Jamie Hayes	3–8
Race Car Experiences	Peugeot 308 Racing Cup	175	(United Kingdom) Jimmy Broadbent	1
Race Car Experiences	Peugeot 308 Racing Cup	175	(United Kingdom) Scott Sumpton	1
Cup Invitation
DH Racing	VW Scirocco	13	(United Kingdom) Tom MacFarlane	8
TCR
TSR Performance	Cupra León TCR	7	(United Kingdom) Rob Ellick	1–6, 8
TSR Performance	Cupra León TCR	7	(United Kingdom) Fynn Jones	1–6, 8
JLC Group Motorsport	Cupra León TCR	14	(United Kingdom) Jamie Hayes	1
JLC Group Motorsport	Cupra León TCR	14	(United Kingdom) Alex Read	1
Full Throttle Motorsport	Cupra León Competición TCR	24	(United Kingdom) Richard Avery	1, 3, 5–7
Full Throttle Motorsport	Cupra León Competición TCR	24	(United Kingdom) Nick Hull	1, 3, 5–7
Capture Motorsport	Cupra León TCR	25	(United Kingdom) Darren Ball	2–5
EDF Motorsport	Cupra León Competición TCR	60	(United Kingdom) Ashley Woodman	1–7
TCR Invitation
Area Motorsport	Cupra León VZ TCR	2	(United Kingdom) Sam Laidlaw	6
Area Motorsport	Cupra León VZ TCR	100	(United Kingdom) Steve Laidlaw	6
JH Motorsport	Audi RS 3 LMS TCR (2021)	11	(United Kingdom) Jac Constable	8
SGM Motorsport	Audi RS 3 LMS TCR (2017)	12	(France) Cedric Bloch	8
Jamsport Racing	Subaru WRX STI TCR	29	(United Kingdom) Jenson O'Neill-Going	8
Jamsport Racing	Subaru WRX STI TCR	29	(United Kingdom) Liam Turnbull	8

== Race results ==
Bold indicates overall winner.

Round		Circuit	Pole position	Winning CHL	Winning GT	Winning GN	Winning T	Winning CUP	Winning TCR
1	R1	Silverstone International	No. 8 Toro Verde GT	**No. 8 Toro Verde GT**	No. 11 Barton Racing by Geoff Steel Racing	No. 47 Datum Motorsport	No. 118 Mauger Motorsport	No. 4 Team BRIT	No. 14 JLC Group Motorsport
1	R1	Silverstone International	(United Kingdom) Steve Gambrell (United Kingdom) Daniel Lloyd	**(United Kingdom) Steve Gambrell** **(United Kingdom) Daniel Lloyd**	(United Kingdom) Harry Barton	(Italy) Marco Anastasi (Italy) Maurizio Sciglio	(United Kingdom) Simon Mauger	(United Kingdom) Asha Silva (United Kingdom) Bobby Trundley	(United Kingdom) Jamie Hayes (United Kingdom) Alex Read
1	R2	Silverstone International		**No. 8 Toro Verde GT**	No. 63 Raceworks Motorsport	No. 47 Datum Motorsport	No. 33 MacG Racing	No. 114 JLC Group Motorsport	No. 60 EDF Motorsport
1	R2	Silverstone International		**(United Kingdom) Steve Gambrell** **(United Kingdom) Daniel Lloyd**	(United Kingdom) Chris Bingham	(Italy) Marco Anastasi (Italy) Maurizio Sciglio	(United Kingdom) Jonny MacGregor	(United Kingdom) Chris Hayes	(United Kingdom) Ashley Woodman
2	R3	Silverstone GP	No. 8 Toro Verde GT	**No. 8 Toro Verde GT**	No. 63 Raceworks Motorsport	No. 47 Datum Motorsport	No. 10 Woodrow Motorsport	No. 4 Team BRIT	No. 25 Capture Motorsport
2	R3	Silverstone GP	(United Kingdom) Steve Gambrell (United Kingdom) Daniel Lloyd	**(United Kingdom) Steve Gambrell** **(United Kingdom) Daniel Lloyd**	(United Kingdom) Chris Bingham (United Kingdom) Michael Lyons	(Italy) Marco Anastasi (Italy) Maurizio Sciglio	(United Kingdom) Calum Bates	(United Kingdom) Asha Silva (United Kingdom) Bobby Trundley	(United Kingdom) Darren Ball
3	R4	Snetterton 300	No. 16 FF Corse & Red River Sport	**No. 16 FF Corse & Red River Sport**	No. 11 Barton Racing by Geoff Steel Racing	No. 47 Datum Motorsport	No. 721 Woodrow Motorsport	No. 114 JLC Group Motorsport	No. 7 TSR Performance
3	R4	Snetterton 300	(United Kingdom) Bonamy Grimes (United Kingdom) Johnny Mowlem	**(United Kingdom) Bonamy Grimes** **(United Kingdom) Johnny Mowlem**	(United Kingdom) Harry Barton	(Italy) Marco Anastasi (Italy) Maurizio Sciglio	(United Kingdom) Chris Murphy	(United Kingdom) Chris Hayes (United Kingdom) Jamie Hayes	(United Kingdom) Rob Ellick (United Kingdom) Fynn Jones
3	R5	Snetterton 300		**No. 16 FF Corse & Red River Sport**	No. 147 SGM Motorsport	No. 3 Datum Motorsport	No. 22 RaceCar Consultants	No. 114 JLC Group Motorsport	No. 25 Capture Motorsport
3	R5	Snetterton 300		**(United Kingdom) Bonamy Grimes** **(United Kingdom) Johnny Mowlem**	(United Kingdom) David Fielder	(United Kingdom) Nick Casey	(United Kingdom) Elliot Wilson (United Kingdom) Ian Wilson	(United Kingdom) Chris Hayes (United Kingdom) Jamie Hayes	(United Kingdom) Darren Ball
4	R6	Thruxton Circuit	No. 16 FF Corse & Red River Sport	**No. 74 Amspeed**	No. 147 SGM Motorsport	No. 118 118 Rescue by Datum	No. 10 Woodrow Motorsport	No. 77 TSR Performance	No. 7 TSR Performance
4	R6	Thruxton Circuit	(United Kingdom) Bonamy Grimes (United Kingdom) Johnny Mowlem	**(United Kingdom) Dominic Malone** **(United Kingdom) Adam Smalley**	(United Kingdom) David Fielder	(United Kingdom) Dave May (United Kingdom) Mark Skeats	(United Kingdom) Calum Bates	(United Kingdom) Craig Fleming (United Kingdom) Mark Jones	(United Kingdom) Rob Ellick (United Kingdom) Fynn Jones
4	R7	Thruxton Circuit		**No. 74 Amspeed**	No. 23 Woodrow Motorsport	No. 118 118 Rescue by Datum	No. 10 Woodrow Motorsport	No. 4 Team BRIT	No. 7 TSR Performance
4	R7	Thruxton Circuit		**(United Kingdom) Dominic Malone** **(United Kingdom) Adam Smalley**	(United Kingdom) Nathan Wells	(United Kingdom) Dave May (United Kingdom) Mark Skeats	(United Kingdom) Calum Bates	(United Kingdom) Asha Silva (United Kingdom) Bobby Trundley	(United Kingdom) Rob Ellick (United Kingdom) Fynn Jones
5	R8	Donington Park National	No. 74 Amspeed	**No. 18 Amspeed**	No. 63 Raceworks Motorsport	No. 47 Datum Motorsport	No. 721 Woodrow Motorsport	No. 114 JLC Group Motorsport	No. 25 Capture Motorsport
5	R8	Donington Park National	(United Kingdom) Dominic Malone (United Kingdom) Adam Smalley	**(United Kingdom) James Kellett** **(United Kingdom) Ash Muldoon**	(United Kingdom) Chris Bingham (United Kingdom) Michael Lyons	(Italy) Marco Anastasi (Italy) Maurizio Sciglio	(United Kingdom) Chris Murphy	(United Kingdom) Chris Hayes (United Kingdom) Jamie Hayes	(United Kingdom) Darren Ball
6	R9	Snetterton 300	No. 32 SG Racing	**No. 74 Amspeed**	No. 38 Team BRIT	No. 31 Morris Motorsport	No. 888 Brookspeed with UBIQ	No. 4 Team BRIT	No. 2 Area Motorsport
6	R9	Snetterton 300	(United Kingdom) Mark Cunningham (United Kingdom) Peter Cunningham	**(United Kingdom) Dominic Malone** **(United Kingdom) Adam Smalley**	(United Kingdom) Noah Cosby (United Kingdom) Aaron Morgan	(United Kingdom) Dan Morris (United Kingdom) Colin White	(United Kingdom) Andrew Dawber (United Kingdom) Nathan Wright	(United Kingdom) Asha Silva (United Kingdom) Bobby Trundley	(United Kingdom) Sam Laidlaw
7	R10	Oulton Park	No. 74 Amspeed	**No. 74 Amspeed**	No. 2 Geoff Steel Racing	No. 118 118 Rescue by Datum	No. 10 Woodrow Motorsport	No. 4 Team BRIT	No. 24 Full Throttle Motorsport
7	R10	Oulton Park	(United Kingdom) Dominic Malone (United Kingdom) Charles Rainford	**(United Kingdom) Dominic Malone** **(United Kingdom) Charles Rainford**	(United Kingdom) Peter Moulsdale	(United Kingdom) Dave May (United Kingdom) Mark Skeats	(United Kingdom) Calum Bates	(United Kingdom) Asha Silva (United Kingdom) Bobby Trundley	(United Kingdom) Richard Avery (United Kingdom) Nick Hull
8	R11	Brands Hatch Indy	No. 16 FF Corse & Red River Sport	**No. 74 Amspeed**	No. 23 Woodrow Motorsport	No. 82 Hills Motorsport	No. 22 RaceCar Consultants	No. 114 JLC Group Motorsport	No. 7 TSR Performance
8	R11	Brands Hatch Indy	(United Kingdom) Bonamy Grimes (United Kingdom) Johnny Mowlem	**(United Kingdom) Dominic Malone** **(United Kingdom) Adam Smalley**	(United Kingdom) Nathan Wells	(United Kingdom) Aiden Hills (United Kingdom) Michael Knibbs	(United Kingdom) Elliot Wilson (United Kingdom) Ian Wilson	(United Kingdom) Chris Hayes (United Kingdom) Jamie Hayes	(United Kingdom) Rob Ellick (United Kingdom) Fynn Jones
8	R12	Brands Hatch Indy		**No. 74 Amspeed**	No. 23 Woodrow Motorsport	No. 3 Datum Motorsport	No. 10 Woodrow Motorsport	No. 13 DH Racing	No. 11 JH Motorsport
8	R12	Brands Hatch Indy		**(United Kingdom) Dominic Malone** **(United Kingdom) Adam Smalley**	(United Kingdom) Nathan Wells	(United Kingdom) Nick Casey (Brazil) Adriano Mederios	(United Kingdom) Calum Bates	(United Kingdom) Robert MacFarlane	(United Kingdom) Jac Constable

=== Overall championship standings ===
Points are awarded as follows in all classes:

System	1st	2nd	3rd	4th	5th	6th	7th	8th	9th	10th	11th	12th	13th	14th	15th	R1 PP	FL
+2	30	27	25	20	19	18	17	16	15	14	13	12	11	10	9	1	1

System	1st	2nd	PP	FL
-2	20	17	1	1

Pos.	Drivers	No.	Class	SILIN		SILGP	SNE1		THR		DON	SNE2	OUL	BRH		Pts
1	(United Kingdom) Dominic Malone	74	CHL	2	2	4	3	2	1	1	**2**	1	**1**	1	1	308
1	(United Kingdom) Adam Smalley	74	CHL	2	2				1	1	**2**	1		1	1	308
1	(United Kingdom) Dan Cammish	74	CHL			4										308
1	(United Kingdom) Charles Rainford	74	CHL										**1**			308
2	(United Kingdom) Asha Silva (United Kingdom) Bobby Trundley	4	CUP	26	28	24	24	18	20	13	**21**	**5**	**12**	Ret	23	306
3	(United Kingdom) Rob Ellick (United Kingdom) Fynn Jones	7	TCR	17	17	22	**16**	13	**5**	**5**	**18**	11		17	19	292
4	(United Kingdom) Chris Bingham	63	GT	**12**	5	6	18	NC	3	3	3	**Ret**	**4**	6	5	287
4	(United Kingdom) Michael Lyons	63	GT			6					3	**Ret**	**4**			287
5	(Italy) Marco Anastasi (Italy) Maurizio Sciglio	47	GN	**8**	9	**11**	**12**	Ret	16	NC	**9**	**Ret**	**9**	27	24	281
=	(United Kingdom) Chris Hayes	114	CUP	Ret	26	**30**	**20**	16	**19**	Ret	**20**	15	14	**24**	Ret	281
=	(United Kingdom) Simon Mauger	114	CUP			**30**										281
=	(United Kingdom) Jamie Hayes	114	CUP				**20**	16	**19**	Ret	**20**	15	14	**24**	Ret	281
6	(United Kingdom) Chris Murphy	721	T	15	18	23	5	9	14	11	5	12	6	23	7	273
7	(United Kingdom) Calum Bates	10	T	Ret	Ret	**5**	8	8	4	4	6	**19**†	2	14	6	265.5
8	(United Kingdom) Martin Addison	189	GT	19	19	18	15	7	18	7	14	6	8	7	Ret	256
9	(United Kingdom) Nick Casey	3	GN	10	10	13	21	10	**8**	Ret	25†			Ret	4	247
9	(Brazil) Adriano Mederios	3	GN	10	10	13								Ret	4	247
10	(United Kingdom) Ashley Woodman	60	TCR	11	12	**19**	DSQ	12	Ret	12	12	9	DNS			223
11	(United Kingdom) Dave May (United Kingdom) Mark Skeats	110; 118	GN				Ret	Ret	6	8	17	18	7	9	NC	212.5
12	(United Kingdom) Noah Cosby	38	GT	22	7	14	17	4	12	Ret	4	2	Ret			210.5
12	(United Kingdom) Caleb McDuff	38	GT	22	7	14	17	4	12	Ret	4		Ret			210.5
12	(United Kingdom) Aaron Morgan	38	GT									2				210.5
13	(United Kingdom) James Harrison (United Kingdom) Steve Harrison	62	T	21	22	25†	11	16	15	10	19		DNS	22	11	191
14	(United Kingdom) Elliot Wilson (United Kingdom) Ian Wilson	22	T	13	15	21	**9**	6			10	Ret		10	Ret	181
15	(United Kingdom) Andrew Dawber (United Kingdom) Nathan Wright	888	T	25	24		23	15	13	9		3		NC	15	177.5
16	(United Kingdom) Jonny MacGregor	33	T	27	6	12	10	11	**NC**	Ret	16	17				176.5
16	(United Kingdom) Josh Tomlinson	33	T			12	10	11	**NC**	Ret	16	17				176.5
17	(United Kingdom) Lee Goldsmith	70	T	20	20	15	7	Ret			8	14	10			167.5
17	(Australia) Bart Horsten	70	T			15										167.5
17	(United Kingdom) Gustav Burton	70	T								8	14				167.5
18	(United Kingdom) David Fielder	147	GT			8	13	3	2	6		10				167
19	(United Kingdom) Bonamy Grimes (United Kingdom) Johnny Mowlem	16	CHL	Ret	4	3	**1**	1	**10**	DNS				**3**	DNS	166
20	(United Kingdom) Richard Avery (United Kingdom) Nick Hull	24	TCR	24	25		19	Ret			24	13	**16**			159
21	(United Kingdom) Alan McCullough (United Kingdom) Dennis Storey	77	CUP	28	27	26	22	20					15			158
22	(United Kingdom) Ash Muldoon	18	CHL	4	DNS	2			11	DNS	1			2	10	154
22	(United Kingdom) James Kellett	18	CHL			2			11	DNS	1			2	10	154
23	(United Kingdom) Nathan Wells	23	GT						**7**	2	7		DNS	**4**	2	140
24	(United Kingdom) Steve Gambrell	8	CHL	**1**	1	**1**	2	NC	Ret	DNS						139
24	(United Kingdom) Daniel Lloyd	8	CHL	**1**	1	**1**			Ret	DNS						139
25	(United Kingdom) Mark Jones	77	CUP	Ret	DNS				17	14	Ret			25	18	133.5
25	(United Kingdom) Craig Fleming	77	CUP	Ret	DNS				17	14				25	18	133.5
25	(United Kingdom) Marc Kemp	77	CUP								Ret					133.5
26	(United Kingdom) Alex Turnbull	162	T	16	14	16	6	14			11					125
26	(United Kingdom) Alex Toth-Jones	162	T			16					11					125
27	(United Kingdom) Darren Ball	25	TCR			17	25	5	9	DSQ	26†					122
28	(United Kingdom) Bryan Bransom (United Kingdom) Jasver Sapra	40	T	18	11	27†	NC	19			DSQ			**12**	Ret	119.5
29	(United Kingdom) Paul Fullick	68	GT	14	Ret	10	Ret	DNS			23	NC	17			110.5
29	(United Kingdom) Aaron Morgan	68	GT	14	Ret	10	Ret	DNS			23		17			110.5
29	(Japan) Takuma Aoki	68	GT									NC				110.5
30	(Republic of Ireland) Barry McMahon	57	GT	23	23	20								19	16	102
30	(United Kingdom) Paul Plant	57	GT											19	16	102
31	(United Kingdom) Mark Cunningham (United Kingdom) Peter Cunningham	32	CHL	3	3	7			Ret	DNS		**8**				99
32	(United Kingdom) Stephen Fresle	43	GN	Ret	21	Ret					Ret					60
32	(United Kingdom) Simon Green	43	GN	Ret												60
32	(United Kingdom) Jack Mitchell	43	GN			Ret					Ret					60
33	(United Kingdom) Jamie Hayes (United Kingdom) Alex Read	14	TCR	**9**	16											57
=	(United Kingdom) Simon Mauger	118	T	**6**	8											57
35	(United Kingdom) Karl Jones (United Kingdom) Mark Smith	36	CHL											11	3	47
36	(United Kingdom) Dan Morris (United Kingdom) Colin White	31	GN			Ret						16				40
37	(United Kingdom) Mark Smith (United Kingdom) Colin Turkington	36	GT				14	Ret								36.5
38	(United Kingdom) Archie Buttle	42	T									NC	11	Ret	NC	29
38	(United Kingdom) Freddie Ingram	42	T											Ret	NC	29
38	(United Kingdom) John Seale (United Kingdom) Jamie Stanley	55	CHL	5	Ret											28.5
39	(United Kingdom) Martin Byford (United Kingdom) David Farrow	34	CUP			29†										25
=	(United Kingdom) Matt Rainbow	78	CUP								22					25
=	(United Kingdom) Andy Cummings (United Kingdom) David Ward	55	GN										13			25
=	(Greece) Mike Chalkiopolou (United Kingdom) Simon Griffths	37	CHL								24†					25
40	(United Kingdom) Jack Layton (United Kingdom) Matthew Saunders	73	GT								13		DSQ			20
41	(United Kingdom) Jimmy Broadbent (United Kingdom) Scott Sumpton	175	CUP	**Ret**	DNS											10
42	(United Kingdom) Will Powell (United Kingdom) Dave Scaramanga	2	GT	Ret	DNS											9
=	(United Kingdom) Andy Christopher	21	CHL			28†										9
43	(United Kingdom) Craig Fleming (United Kingdom) Mark Jones	77	T									Ret				8
-	(United Kingdom) Alistair Camp	45	CUP									DNS				0
Invitational drivers ineligible for points
	(United Kingdom) Harry Barton	11	GT	7	13	**9**	**11**	Ret			Ret					
	(United Kingdom) Peter Moulsdale	2	GT										3			
	(United Kingdom) Sam Laidlaw	2	TCR									4				
	(United Kingdom) Luke Bennett (United Kingdom) Daniel Wyile	41	CHL											5	Ret	
	(United Kingdom) Steve Laidlaw	100	TCR									**7**				
	(United Kingdom) Aiden Hills (United Kingdom) Michael Knibbs	82	GN											**8**	13	
	(United Kingdom) Michael Wheeler (United Kingdom) Richard Wheeler	24	GT											15	**8**	
	(United Kingdom) Jac Constable	11	TCR											**18**	9	
	(United Kingdom) Daniel Lloyd (United Kingdom) Alex Read	14	T											Ret	12	
	(United Kingdom) Carl Garnett (United Kingdom) Darron Lewis	297	T											13	14	
	(United Kingdom) Sevin Christian (United Kingdom) Simon Griffiths	26	GT											16	21	
	(United Kingdom) Robert MacFarlane	13	CUP											26	17	
	(United Kingdom) Stephen Fresle (United Kingdom) Jack Mitchell	43	T											20	20	
	(France) Cedric Bloch	11	TCR											21	22	
	(United Kingdom) Jenson O'Neill-Going (United Kingdom) Liam Turnbull	29	TCR											Ret	DNS	
Pos.	Drivers	No.	Class	SILIN		SILGP	SNE1		THR		DON	SNE2	OUL	BRH		Pts

=== Class Standings ===
Pos.	Drivers	No.	SILIN		SILGP	SNE1		THR		DON	SNE2	OUL	BRH		Pts
Challenge
1	(United Kingdom) Dominic Malone	74	2	2	4	3	2	1	1	**2**	1	**1**	1	1	308
1	(United Kingdom) Adam Smalley	74	2	2				1	1	**2**	1		1	1	308
1	(United Kingdom) Dan Cammish	74			4										308
1	(United Kingdom) Charles Rainford	74										**1**			308
2	(United Kingdom) Bonamy Grimes (United Kingdom) Johnny Mowlem	16	Ret	4	3	**1**	1	**10**	DNS				**3**	DNS	166
3	(United Kingdom) Ash Muldoon	18	4	DNS	2			11	DNS	1			2	10	154
3	(United Kingdom) James Kellett	18			2			11	DNS	1			2	10	154
4	(United Kingdom) Steve Gambrell	8	**1**	1	**1**	2	NC	Ret	DNS						139
4	(United Kingdom) Daniel Lloyd	8	**1**	1	**1**			Ret	DNS						139
5	(United Kingdom) Mark Cunningham (United Kingdom) Peter Cunningham	32	3	3	7			Ret	DNS		**8**				99
6	(United Kingdom) Karl Jones (United Kingdom) Mark Smith	36											11	3	47
7	(United Kingdom) John Seale (United Kingdom) Jamie Stanley	55	5	Ret											28.5
8	(Greece) Mike Chalkiopolou (United Kingdom) Simon Griffths	37								24†					25
9	(United Kingdom) Andy Christopher	21			28†										9
Invitational drivers ineligible for points
	(United Kingdom) Luke Bennett (United Kingdom) Daniel Wyile	41											5	Ret	
GT
1	(United Kingdom) Chris Bingham	63	**12**	5	6	18	NC	3	3	3	**Ret**	**4**	6	5	287
1	(United Kingdom) Michael Lyons	63			6					3	**Ret**	**4**			287
2	(United Kingdom) Martin Addison	189	19	19	18	15	7	18	7	14	6	8	7	Ret	256
3	(United Kingdom) Noah Cosby	38	22	7	14	17	4	12	Ret	4	2	Ret			210.5
3	(United Kingdom) Caleb McDuff	38	22	7	14	17	4	12	Ret	4		Ret			210.5
3	(United Kingdom) Aaron Morgan	38									2				210.5
4	(United Kingdom) David Fielder	147			8	13	3	2	6		10				167
5	(United Kingdom) Nathan Wells	23						**7**	2	7		DNS	**4**	2	140
6	(United Kingdom) Paul Fullick	68	14	Ret	10	Ret	DNS			23	NC	17			110.5
6	(United Kingdom) Aaron Morgan	68	14	Ret	10	Ret	DNS			23		17			110.5
6	(Japan) Takuma Aoki	68									NC				110.5
7	(Republic of Ireland) Barry McMahon	57	23	23	20								19	16	102
7	(United Kingdom) Paul Plant	57											19	16	102
8	(United Kingdom) Mark Smith (United Kingdom) Colin Turkington	36				14	Ret								36.5
9	(United Kingdom) Jack Layton (United Kingdom) Matthew Saunders	73								13		DSQ			20
10	(United Kingdom) Will Powell (United Kingdom) Dave Scaramanga	2	Ret	DNS											9
Invitational drivers ineligible for points
	(United Kingdom) Harry Barton	11	7	13	**9**	**11**	Ret			Ret					
	(United Kingdom) Peter Moulsdale	2										3			
	(United Kingdom) Michael Wheeler (United Kingdom) Richard Wheeler	24											15	**8**	
	(United Kingdom) Sevin Christian (United Kingdom) Simon Griffiths	26											16	21	
Ginetta
1	(Italy) Marco Anastasi (Italy) Maurizio Sciglio	47	**8**	9	**11**	**12**	Ret	16	NC	**9**	**Ret**	**9**	27	24	281
2	(United Kingdom) Nick Casey	3	10	10	13	21	10	**8**	Ret	25†			Ret	4	247
2	(Brazil) Adriano Mederios	3	10	10	13								Ret	4	247
3	(United Kingdom) Dave May (United Kingdom) Mark Skeats	110; 118				Ret	Ret	6	8	17	18	7	9	NC	212.5
4	(United Kingdom) Stephen Fresle	43	Ret	21	Ret					Ret					60
4	(United Kingdom) Simon Green	43	Ret												60
4	(United Kingdom) Jack Mitchell	43			Ret					Ret					60
5	(United Kingdom) Dan Morris (United Kingdom) Colin White	31			Ret						16				40
6	(United Kingdom) Andy Cummings (United Kingdom) David Ward	55										13			25
Invitational drivers ineligible for points
	(United Kingdom) Aiden Hills (United Kingdom) Michael Knibbs	82											**8**	13	
Trophy
1	(United Kingdom) Chris Murphy	721	15	18	23	5	9	14	11	5	12	6	23	7	273
2	(United Kingdom) Calum Bates	10	Ret	Ret	**5**	8	8	4	4	6	**19**†	2	14	6	265.5
3	(United Kingdom) James Harrison (United Kingdom) Steve Harrison	62	21	22	25†	11	16	15	10	19		DNS	22	11	191
4	(United Kingdom) Elliot Wilson (United Kingdom) Ian Wilson	22	13	15	21	**9**	6			10	Ret		10	Ret	181
5	(United Kingdom) Andrew Dawber (United Kingdom) Nathan Wright	888	25	24		23	15	13	9		3		NC	15	177.5
6	(United Kingdom) Jonny MacGregor	33	27	6	12	10	11	**NC**	Ret	16	17				176.5
6	(United Kingdom) Josh Tomlinson	33			12	10	11	**NC**	Ret	16	17				176.5
7	(United Kingdom) Lee Goldsmith	70	20	20	15	7	Ret			8	14	10			167.5
7	(Australia) Bart Horsten	70			15										167.5
7	(United Kingdom) Gustav Burton	70								8	14				167.5
8	(United Kingdom) Alex Turnbull	162	16	14	16	6	14			11					125
8	(United Kingdom) Alex Toth-Jones	162			16					11					125
9	(United Kingdom) Bryan Bransom (United Kingdom) Jasver Sapra	40	18	11	27†	NC	19			DSQ			**12**	Ret	119.5
10	(United Kingdom) Simon Mauger	118	**6**	8											57
11	(United Kingdom) Archie Buttle	42									NC	11	Ret	NC	29
11	(United Kingdom) Freddie Ingram	42											Ret	NC	29
12	(United Kingdom) Craig Fleming (United Kingdom) Mark Jones	77									Ret				8
Invitational drivers ineligible for points
	(United Kingdom) Daniel Lloyd (United Kingdom) Alex Read	14											Ret	12	
	(United Kingdom) Carl Garnett (United Kingdom) Darron Lewis	297											13	14	
	(United Kingdom) Stephen Fresle (United Kingdom) Jack Mitchell	43											20	20	
Cup
1	(United Kingdom) Asha Silva (United Kingdom) Bobby Trundley	4	26	28	24	24	18	20	13	**21**	**5**	**12**	Ret	23	306
2	(United Kingdom) Chris Hayes	114	Ret	26	**30**	**20**	16	**19**	Ret	**20**	15	14	**24**	Ret	281
2	(United Kingdom) Simon Mauger	114			**30**										281
2	(United Kingdom) Jamie Hayes	114				**20**	16	**19**	Ret	**20**	15	14	**24**	Ret	281
3	(United Kingdom) Alan McCullough (United Kingdom) Dennis Storey	77	28	27	26	22	20					15			158
4	(United Kingdom) Mark Jones	77	Ret	DNS				17	14	Ret			25	18	133.5
4	(United Kingdom) Craig Fleming	77	Ret	DNS				17	14				25	18	133.5
4	(United Kingdom) Marc Kemp	77								Ret					133.5
5	(United Kingdom) Martin Byford (United Kingdom) David Farrow	34			29†										25
=	(United Kingdom) Matt Rainbow	78								22					25
6	(United Kingdom) Jimmy Broadbent (United Kingdom) Scott Sumpton	175	**Ret**	DNS											10
-	(United Kingdom) Alistair Camp	45									DNS				0
Invitational drivers ineligible for points
	(United Kingdom) Robert MacFarlane	13											26	17	
TCR
1	(United Kingdom) Rob Ellick (United Kingdom) Fynn Jones	7	17	17	22	**16**	13	**5**	**5**	**18**	11		17	19	292
2	(United Kingdom) Ashley Woodman	60	11	12	**19**	DSQ	12	Ret	12	12	9	DNS			223
3	(United Kingdom) Richard Avery (United Kingdom) Nick Hull	24	24	25		19	Ret			24	13	**16**			159
4	(United Kingdom) Darren Ball	25			17	25	5	9	DSQ	26†					122
5	(United Kingdom) Jamie Hayes (United Kingdom) Alex Read	14	**9**	16											57
Invitational drivers ineligible for points
	(United Kingdom) Sam Laidlaw	2									4				
	(United Kingdom) Steve Laidlaw	100									**7**				
	(United Kingdom) Jac Constable	11											**18**	9	
	(France) Cedric Bloch	11											21	22	
	(United Kingdom) Jenson O'Neill-Going (United Kingdom) Liam Turnbull	29											Ret	DNS	
Pos.	Drivers	No.	SILIN		SILGP	SNE1		THR		DON	SNE2	OUL	BRH		Pts
