= 2025 British Touring Car Championship =

68th season of the British Touring Car Championship

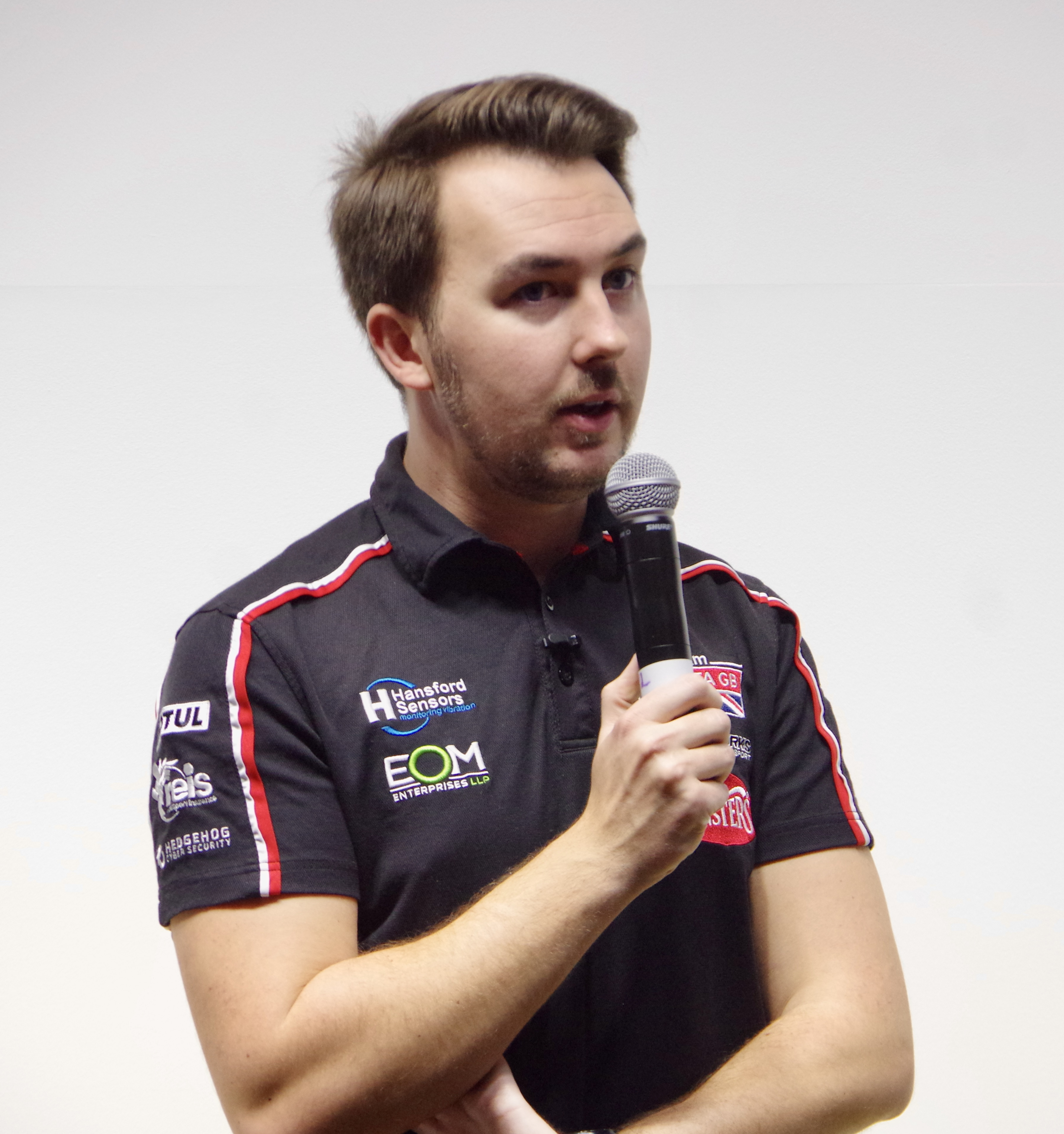
Tom Ingram won his second Drivers' Championship title, winning it by 30 points.

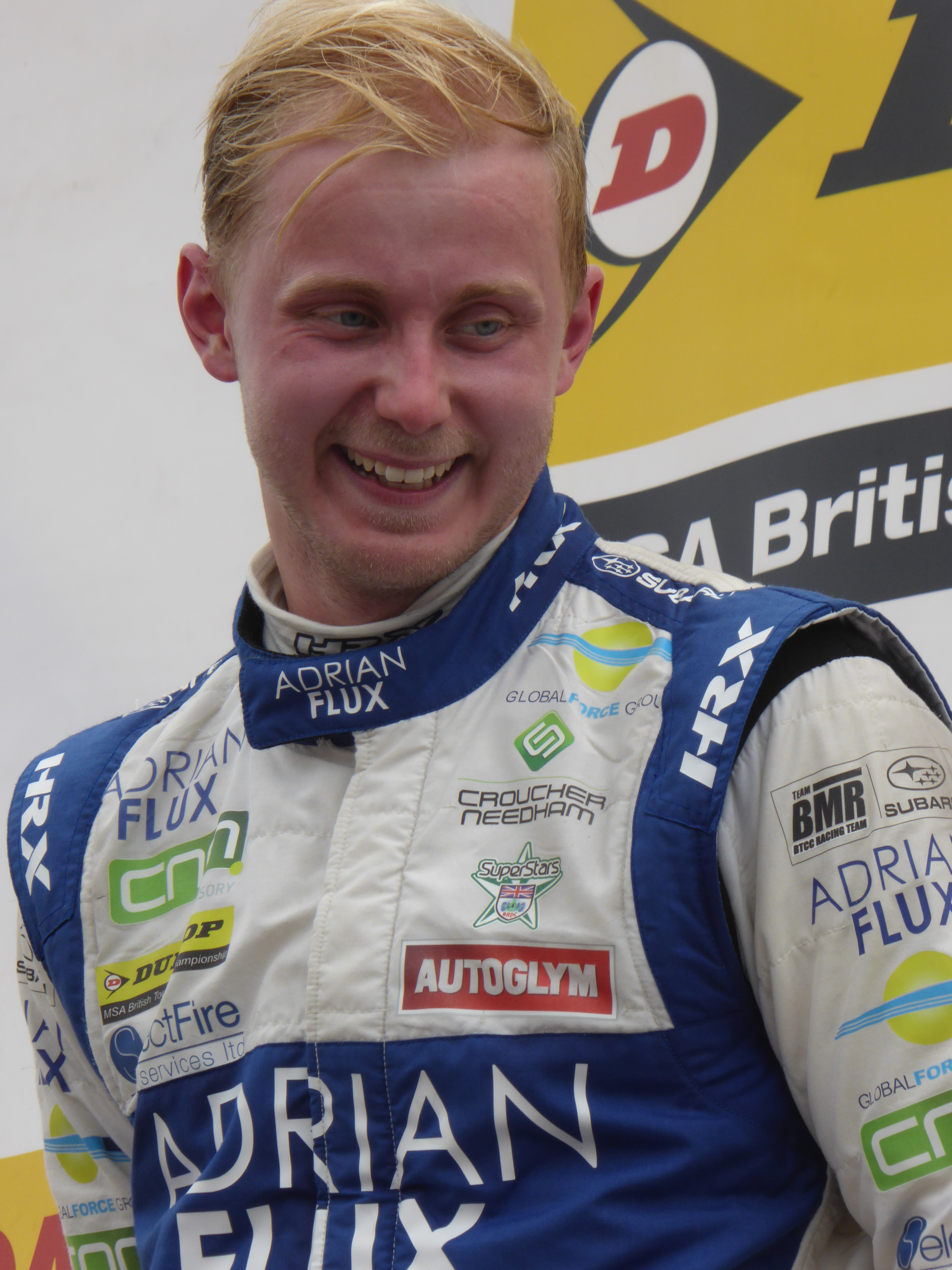
Ashley Sutton finished second in the Drivers' Championship.

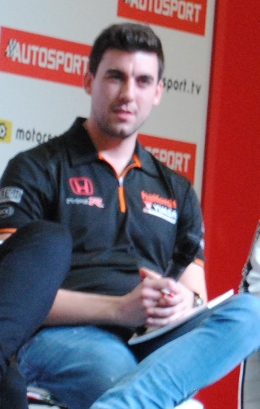
Dan Cammish finished third in the Drivers' Championship, 121 points behind second.

2025 Teams' Champion NAPA Racing UK

The 2025 Kwik Fit British Touring Car Championship (commonly abbreviated as BTCC) was a motor racing championship for production-based touring cars held across England and Scotland. The championship featured a mix of professional motor racing teams and privately funded amateur drivers competing in highly modified versions of family cars which are sold to the general public and conform to the technical regulations for the championship. The 2025 season was the 68th British Touring Car Championship season, the 15th season for cars conforming to the Next Generation Touring Car (NGTC) technical specification.

This was the first season using 100% renewable fuels, with the hybrid boost being removed and being replaced with turbo boost. While the amount of power boost stayed the same the weight will be reduced by 55 kg (121 lb). In another change to the 2024 season all uses of boost were removed from the timing screens, however was still be visible to viewers at home and at the track.

== Teams and drivers ==
Team	Car	Engine	No.	Drivers	Rounds
Constructor Entries
Laser Tools Racing with MB Motorsport	BMW 330i M Sport LCI	BMW/Neil Brown	1	(United Kingdom) Jake Hill	All (Note: Jake Hill was entered into the Croft round, but withdrew due to an ear infection.)
West Surrey Racing	BMW 330i M Sport LCI	BMW/Neil Brown	2	(Philippines) Daryl De Leon	All
LKQ Euro Car Parts Racing with WSR	BMW 330i M Sport LCI	BMW/Neil Brown	16	(United Kingdom) Aiden Moffat	All
LKQ Euro Car Parts Racing with WSR	BMW 330i M Sport LCI	BMW/Neil Brown	99	(United Kingdom) Charles Rainford	All
Team VERTU	Hyundai i30 Fastback N Performance	Hyundai/Swindon	3	(United Kingdom) Tom Chilton	All
Team VERTU	Hyundai i30 Fastback N Performance	Hyundai/Swindon	18	(United Kingdom) Senna Proctor	4–10
Team VERTU	Hyundai i30 Fastback N Performance	Hyundai/Swindon	33	(United Kingdom) Adam Morgan	All
Team VERTU	Hyundai i30 Fastback N Performance	Hyundai/Swindon	54	(United Kingdom) Ryan Bensley	3
Team VERTU	Hyundai i30 Fastback N Performance	Hyundai/Swindon	80	(United Kingdom) Tom Ingram	All
Team VERTU	Hyundai i30 Fastback N Performance	Hyundai/Swindon	777	(United Kingdom) Michael Crees	1–2
Toyota Gazoo Racing UK with IAA	Toyota Corolla GR Sport	Toyota/Neil Brown	14	(United Kingdom) Ronan Pearson	1–4
Toyota Gazoo Racing UK with IAA	Toyota Corolla GR Sport	Toyota/Neil Brown	19	(United Kingdom) Max Buxton	6–10
Toyota Gazoo Racing UK with IAA	Toyota Corolla GR Sport	Toyota/Neil Brown	26	(United Kingdom) Finn Leslie	5
Toyota Gazoo Racing UK with IAA	Toyota Corolla GR Sport	Toyota/Neil Brown	40	(Republic of Ireland) Árón Taylor-Smith	1–7
Toyota Gazoo Racing UK with IAA	Toyota Corolla GR Sport	Toyota/Neil Brown	52	(United Kingdom) Gordon Shedden	1–7
Toyota Gazoo Racing UK with IAA	Toyota Corolla GR Sport	Toyota/Neil Brown	66	(United Kingdom) Josh Cook	8–10
Toyota Gazoo Racing UK with IAA	Toyota Corolla GR Sport	Toyota/Neil Brown	132	(United Kingdom) James Dorlin	1–7
Toyota Gazoo Racing UK with IAA	Toyota Corolla GR Sport	TOCA/M-Sport	40	(Republic of Ireland) Árón Taylor-Smith	8–10
Toyota Gazoo Racing UK with IAA	Toyota Corolla GR Sport	TOCA/M-Sport	52	(United Kingdom) Gordon Shedden	8–10
NAPA Racing UK	Ford Focus ST	Ford/Mountune	27	(United Kingdom) Dan Cammish	All
NAPA Racing UK	Ford Focus ST	Ford/Mountune	32	(United Kingdom) Daniel Rowbottom	All
NAPA Racing UK	Ford Focus ST	Ford/Mountune	77	(United Kingdom) Sam Osborne	All
NAPA Racing UK	Ford Focus ST	Ford/Mountune	116	(United Kingdom) Ashley Sutton	All
Independent Entries
One Motorsport	Honda Civic Type R	TOCA/M-Sport	66	(United Kingdom) Josh Cook	1–5
One Motorsport	Honda Civic Type R	TOCA/M-Sport	12	(United Kingdom) Stephen Jelley	1–5
ROKiT Racing with Un-Limited Motorsport	Cupra León	TOCA/M-Sport	12	(United Kingdom) Stephen Jelley	6
ROKiT Racing with Un-Limited Motorsport	Cupra León	TOCA/M-Sport	17	(United Kingdom) Dexter Patterson	All
ROKiT Racing with Un-Limited Motorsport	Cupra León	TOCA/M-Sport	93	(United Kingdom) Max Hall	1–5
Powder Monkey Brewing Co with Esidock	Cupra León	TOCA/M-Sport	28	(United Kingdom) Nicolas Hamilton	All
Restart Racing	Hyundai i30 Fastback N Performance	Hyundai/Swindon	22	(United Kingdom) Chris Smiley	All
Restart Racing	Hyundai i30 Fastback N Performance	Hyundai/Swindon	123	(United Kingdom) Daniel Lloyd	All
Motor Parts Direct with Power Maxed Racing	Vauxhall Astra	TOCA/M-Sport	50	(United Kingdom) Nick Halstead	2–6 (Note: Nick Halstead was entered into the Thruxton round, but later withdrew on medical grounds due to a rib injury.)
Motor Parts Direct with Power Maxed Racing	Vauxhall Astra	TOCA/M-Sport	88	(United Kingdom) Mikey Doble	1–6
Motor Parts Direct with Power Maxed Racing	Cupra León	TOCA/M-Sport	50	(United Kingdom) Nick Halstead	7–10
Motor Parts Direct with Power Maxed Racing	Cupra León	TOCA/M-Sport	88	(United Kingdom) Mikey Doble	7–10

Key
Eligible for the Jack Sears Trophy for drivers yet to record more than one outright podium
finish or Jack Sears Trophy championship at the start of the season.

Entering/re-entering BTCC

- 2024 Mini Challenge Rookie Cup winner and overall runner-up Max Hall made his BTCC debut with Un-Limited Motorsport in the Cupra León.
- Dexter Patterson returned to the series after having last raced in 2023 for Re.Beverages and Bartercard with Team HARD., driving a second car for Un-Limited Motorsport.
- Ronan Pearson returned to the series after he split with Team Bristol Street Motors after the Knockhill round of last season, joining Toyota Gazoo Racing UK with IAA.
- 2018 TCR UK champion Daniel Lloyd returned to the series again after having last raced in 2023 for Autobrite Direct with Millers Oils, joining Restart Racing.
- 2024 Porsche Carrera Cup GB runner-up Charles Rainford made his BTCC debut with LKQ Euro Car Parts Racing with WSR in the BMW 330i M Sport.
- Triple champion Gordon Shedden returned to the series again after having last raced in 2022 for Halfords Racing with Cataclean, competing for Toyota Gazoo Racing UK with IAA.
- Stephen Jelley returned to the series after having last race in 2023 for Team BMW, racing for One Motorsport.
- James Dorlin made his BTCC debut, after 2 full years out of racing, with Toyota Gazoo Racing UK with IAA in the Toyota Corolla GR Sport.
- Nicolas Hamilton returned to the series after having last raced in 2023 for Go-Fix with Autoaid Breakdown, driving for Un-Limited Motorsport.
- 2020 Jack Sears Trophy winner Michael Crees returned to the series after having last raced in 2023 for Go-Fix with Autoaid Breakdown during the second half of the season, driving the Miller Oils car for Team VERTU.

Changed teams

- Daryl De Leon moved from Duckhams Racing with Bartercard to West Surrey Racing.
- Adam Morgan moved from Team BMW to Team VERTU.
- Árón Taylor-Smith moved from Evans Halshaw Power Maxed Racing to Toyota Gazoo Racing UK with IAA.
- Josh Cook left LKQ Euro Car Parts with SYNETIQ and returned to One Motorsport.

Leaving BTCC

- Both four-time champion Colin Turkington and Restart Racing driver Scott Sumpton took a sabbatical from the series with the aim to focus on the 2026 season.

Team changes

- Restart Racing switched from running Cupra León cars to Excelr8-prepared Hyundai i30 Fastback N Performance cars.
- LKQ Euro Car Parts moved from Toyota Gazoo Racing UK to West Surrey Racing.
- One Motorsport returned to the series after missing the 2024 season.

Mid-Season Changes

- Nick Halstead returned to the BTCC after missing the Donington round, joining Motor Parts Direct with Power Maxed Racing for the Brands Hatch Indy round onwards.
- At Snetterton, Michael Crees let his friend Ryan Bensley take his seat at Team VERTU for the round.
- Senna Proctor returned to the series at Thruxton, 2 races earlier than expected, to drive for Team VERTU after the team had misunderstood the regulations on the maximum driver changes after Bensley replaced Michael Crees for Snetterton.
- Ronan Pearson Missed the round at Oulton Park due to "Commercial Challenges", series debutant Finn Leslie was later named as his replacement.
- Max Buxton took over the vacant seat at Toyota Gazoo Racing UK with IAA from Croft onwards
- Stephen Jelley moved from One Motorsport to ROKiT Racing with Un-Limited Motorsport replacing Max Hall at Croft.
- One Motorsport would miss rounds at Croft and Knockhill, before pulling out of the remainder of the season, shifting focus to 2026.
- On 9 August, a fire destroyed Motor Parts Direct with Power Maxed Racing's facility and cars. The team was able to borrow two Cupra Leóns for the round at Knockhill and for the rest of the season; one privately owned example which was previously raced by Scott Sumpton, and one from fellow competitors Un-Limited Motorsport which had been raced at the previous meeting by Stephen Jelley. Due to the exceptional circumstances, TOCA allowed the loans without them affecting the team's licences to compete.
- Josh Cook replaced James Dorlin at Toyota Gazoo Racing UK with IAA for the Donington Park GP round onwards.
- Toyota Gazoo Racing UK with IAA replaced their engine units with M-Sport TOCA engines in the cars of Árón Taylor-Smith and Gordon Shedden at the Donington GP round. The sister cars of Josh Cook and Max Buxton continues to run the Neil Brown-tuned Toyota engines.

== Race calendar ==
The 2025 calendar was announced on 30 April 2024.

2025 BTCC Race Locations

Round		Circuit	Date
1	R1	Donington Park (National Circuit, Leicestershire)	26–27 April
1	R2	Donington Park (National Circuit, Leicestershire)	26–27 April
1	R3	Donington Park (National Circuit, Leicestershire)	26–27 April
2	R4	Brands Hatch (Indy Circuit, Kent)	10–11 May
2	R5	Brands Hatch (Indy Circuit, Kent)	10–11 May
2	R6	Brands Hatch (Indy Circuit, Kent)	10–11 May
3	R7	Snetterton Motor Racing Circuit (300 Circuit, Norfolk)	24–25 May
3	R8	Snetterton Motor Racing Circuit (300 Circuit, Norfolk)	24–25 May
3	R9	Snetterton Motor Racing Circuit (300 Circuit, Norfolk)	24–25 May
4	R10	Thruxton Circuit (Hampshire)	7–8 June
4	R11	Thruxton Circuit (Hampshire)	7–8 June
4	R12	Thruxton Circuit (Hampshire)	7–8 June
5	R13	Oulton Park (Island Circuit, Cheshire)	21–22 June
5	R14	Oulton Park (Island Circuit, Cheshire)	21–22 June
5	R15	Oulton Park (Island Circuit, Cheshire)	21–22 June
6	R16	Croft Circuit (North Yorkshire)	2–3 August
6	R17	Croft Circuit (North Yorkshire)	2–3 August
6	R18	Croft Circuit (North Yorkshire)	2–3 August
7	R19	Knockhill Racing Circuit (Fife)	16–17 August
7	R20	Knockhill Racing Circuit (Fife)	16–17 August
7	R21	Knockhill Racing Circuit (Fife)	16–17 August
8	R22	Donington Park (Grand Prix Circuit, Leicestershire)	30–31 August
8	R23	Donington Park (Grand Prix Circuit, Leicestershire)	30–31 August
8	R24	Donington Park (Grand Prix Circuit, Leicestershire)	30–31 August
9	R25	Silverstone Circuit (National Circuit, Northamptonshire)	20–21 September
9	R26	Silverstone Circuit (National Circuit, Northamptonshire)	20–21 September
9	R27	Silverstone Circuit (National Circuit, Northamptonshire)	20–21 September
10	R28	Brands Hatch (Grand Prix Circuit, Kent)	4–5 October
10	R29	Brands Hatch (Grand Prix Circuit, Kent)	4–5 October
10	R30	Brands Hatch (Grand Prix Circuit, Kent)	4–5 October

== Results and standings ==
Round		Circuit	Pole position	Fastest lap	Winning driver	Winning team	Winning independent	Winning JST
1	R1	Donington Park National	(United Kingdom) Dan Cammish	(United Kingdom) Ashley Sutton	(United Kingdom) Ashley Sutton	(United Kingdom) NAPA Racing UK	(United Kingdom) Mikey Doble	(United Kingdom) Dexter Patterson
1	R2	Donington Park National		(United Kingdom) Tom Chilton	(United Kingdom) Ashley Sutton	(United Kingdom) NAPA Racing UK	(United Kingdom) Chris Smiley	(United Kingdom) Dexter Patterson
1	R3	Donington Park National		(United Kingdom) Tom Chilton	(United Kingdom) Tom Chilton	(United Kingdom) Team Vertu	(United Kingdom) Mikey Doble	(United Kingdom) Ronan Pearson
2	R1	Brands Hatch Indy	(United Kingdom) Jake Hill	(United Kingdom) Charles Rainford	(United Kingdom) Jake Hill	(United Kingdom) Laser Tools Racing with MB Motorsport	(United Kingdom) Mikey Doble	(United Kingdom) Charles Rainford
2	R2	Brands Hatch Indy		(United Kingdom) Adam Morgan	(Philippines) Daryl De Leon	(United Kingdom) West Surrey Racing	(United Kingdom) Chris Smiley	(Philippines) Daryl De Leon
2	R3	Brands Hatch Indy		(United Kingdom) Tom Ingram	(United Kingdom) Charles Rainford	(United Kingdom) LKQ Euro Car Parts Racing with WSR	(United Kingdom) Chris Smiley	(United Kingdom) Charles Rainford
3	R1	Snetterton Motor Racing Circuit	(United Kingdom) Dan Cammish	(United Kingdom) Dan Cammish	(United Kingdom) Dan Cammish	(United Kingdom) NAPA Racing UK	(United Kingdom) Daniel Lloyd	(Philippines) Daryl De Leon
3	R2	Snetterton Motor Racing Circuit		(United Kingdom) Chris Smiley	(United Kingdom) Daniel Rowbottom	(United Kingdom) NAPA Racing UK	(United Kingdom) Daniel Lloyd	(United Kingdom) Sam Osborne
3	R3	Snetterton Motor Racing Circuit		(United Kingdom) Ashley Sutton	(United Kingdom) Mikey Doble	(United Kingdom) Motor Parts Direct with Power Maxed Racing	(United Kingdom) Mikey Doble	(United Kingdom) Sam Osborne
4	R1	Thruxton Circuit	(United Kingdom) Ashley Sutton	(United Kingdom) Josh Cook	(United Kingdom) Tom Ingram	(United Kingdom) Team Vertu	(United Kingdom) Josh Cook	(United Kingdom) James Dorlin
4	R2	Thruxton Circuit		(United Kingdom) Ashley Sutton	(United Kingdom) Ashley Sutton	(United Kingdom) NAPA Racing UK	(United Kingdom) Josh Cook	(United Kingdom) James Dorlin
4	R3	Thruxton Circuit		(United Kingdom) Ashley Sutton	(United Kingdom) Daniel Rowbottom	(United Kingdom) NAPA Racing UK	(United Kingdom) Josh Cook	(United Kingdom) Sam Osborne
5	R1	Oulton Park	(United Kingdom) Tom Ingram	(United Kingdom) Tom Ingram	(United Kingdom) Tom Ingram	(United Kingdom) Team Vertu	(United Kingdom) Chris Smiley	(United Kingdom) James Dorlin
5	R2	Oulton Park		(United Kingdom) Ashley Sutton	(United Kingdom) Ashley Sutton	(United Kingdom) NAPA Racing UK	(United Kingdom) Josh Cook	(United Kingdom) Sam Osborne
5	R3	Oulton Park		(United Kingdom) Tom Ingram	(United Kingdom) Gordon Shedden	(United Kingdom) Toyota Gazoo Racing UK with IAA	(United Kingdom) Daniel Lloyd	(United Kingdom) James Dorlin
6	R1	Croft Circuit	(United Kingdom) Tom Ingram	(United Kingdom) Tom Ingram	(United Kingdom) Tom Ingram	(United Kingdom) Team Vertu	(United Kingdom) Daniel Lloyd	(Philippines) Daryl De Leon
6	R2	Croft Circuit		(United Kingdom) Daniel Rowbottom	(United Kingdom) Daniel Rowbottom	(United Kingdom) NAPA Racing UK	(United Kingdom) Dexter Patterson	(Philippines) Daryl De Leon
6	R3	Croft Circuit		(United Kingdom) Tom Ingram	(United Kingdom) Ashley Sutton	(United Kingdom) NAPA Racing UK	(United Kingdom) Mikey Doble	(United Kingdom) Sam Osborne
7	R1	Knockhill Racing Circuit	(United Kingdom) Charles Rainford	(United Kingdom) Charles Rainford	(United Kingdom) Jake Hill	(United Kingdom) Laser Tools Racing with MB Motorsport	(United Kingdom) Chris Smiley	(United Kingdom) Charles Rainford
7	R2	Knockhill Racing Circuit		(United Kingdom) Tom Ingram	(United Kingdom) Tom Ingram	(United Kingdom) Team Vertu	(United Kingdom) Chris Smiley	(Philippines) Daryl De Leon
7	R3	Knockhill Racing Circuit		(United Kingdom) Dan Cammish	(United Kingdom) Jake Hill	(United Kingdom) Laser Tools Racing with MB Motorsport	(United Kingdom) Chris Smiley	(United Kingdom) Charles Rainford
8	R1	Donington Park GP	(United Kingdom) Tom Chilton	(United Kingdom) Tom Chilton	(United Kingdom) Tom Chilton	(United Kingdom) Team Vertu	(United Kingdom) Chris Smiley	(Philippines) Daryl De Leon
8	R2	Donington Park GP		(Republic of Ireland) Árón Taylor-Smith	(United Kingdom) Dan Cammish	(United Kingdom) NAPA Racing UK	(United Kingdom) Daniel Lloyd	(Philippines) Daryl De Leon
8	R3	Donington Park GP		(United Kingdom) Tom Ingram	(United Kingdom) Tom Ingram	(United Kingdom) Team Vertu	(United Kingdom) Daniel Lloyd	(Philippines) Daryl De Leon
9	R1	Silverstone National	(Philippines) Daryl De Leon	(United Kingdom) Daniel Lloyd	(United Kingdom) Daniel Lloyd	(United Kingdom) Restart Racing	(United Kingdom) Daniel Lloyd	(Philippines) Daryl De Leon
9	R2	Silverstone National		(United Kingdom) Tom Ingram	(United Kingdom) Tom Ingram	(United Kingdom) Team Vertu	(United Kingdom) Daniel Lloyd	(United Kingdom) Charles Rainford
9	R3	Silverstone National		(United Kingdom) Ashley Sutton	(United Kingdom) Sam Osborne	(United Kingdom) NAPA Racing UK	(United Kingdom) Mikey Doble	(United Kingdom) Sam Osborne
10	R1	Brands Hatch GP	(Philippines) Daryl De Leon	(United Kingdom) Charles Rainford	(United Kingdom) Dan Cammish	(United Kingdom) NAPA Racing UK	(United Kingdom) Daniel Lloyd	(United Kingdom) Charles Rainford
10	R2	Brands Hatch GP		(United Kingdom) Tom Ingram	(United Kingdom) Tom Ingram	(United Kingdom) Team Vertu	(United Kingdom) Chris Smiley	(United Kingdom) Sam Osborne
10	R3	Brands Hatch GP		(United Kingdom) Ashley Sutton	(United Kingdom) Josh Cook	(United Kingdom) Toyota Gazoo Racing UK with IAA	(United Kingdom) Dexter Patterson	(United Kingdom) Sam Osborne

=== Drivers' Championship ===
Points system
1st	2nd	3rd	4th	5th	6th	7th	8th	9th	10th	11th	12th	13th	14th	15th	R1 PP	Fastest lap	Lead laps in race
20	17	15	13	11	10	9	8	7	6	5	4	3	2	1	1	1	1

Notes

- The point for leading laps in race is one point, regardless of how many laps led.

Pos.	Driver	DPN			BHI			SNE			THR			OUL			CRO			KNO			DPGP			SIL			BHGP			Pts
1	(United Kingdom) Tom Ingram	2	2	2	3	11	3^{F}	2	Ret	4	1^{L}	2	2	1^{PFL}	4^{L}	4^{F}	1^{PFL}	8^{L}	2^{F}	3	1^{FL}	4	2^{L}	4^{L}	1^{FL}	7	1^{FL}	5	5	1^{FL}	6	462
2	(United Kingdom) Ashley Sutton	1^{FL}	1^{L}	3	10	3	4	3	10^{L}	2^{F}	4^{PL}	1^{FL}	5^{F}	4	1^{FL}	2	20	5	1^{L}	7	2	3	4	8	2^{L}	8	2	3^{F}	9	2	2^{F}	428
3	(United Kingdom) Dan Cammish	8^{P}	3	4	5	Ret	14	1^{PFL}	19	6	2	4	3	2	10	6	2	10	Ret	5	3	2^{F}	5	1^{L}	12	12	Ret	9	1^{L}	5	Ret	307
4	(United Kingdom) Jake Hill	4	4	10	1^{PL}	8^{L}	2	NC	11	9	6	5	18^{L}	7	5	7	WD	WD	WD	1^{L}	5^{L}	1^{L}	6	9	5	2	3^{L}	4	19	7	3	295
5	(United Kingdom) Daniel Rowbottom	3	5	6	18	9	9^{L}	4	1^{L}	17	5	3	1^{L}	14	6	3	4	1^{FL}	15	14	9	6	3	12	3	9	Ret	14	6	6	DSQ	277
6	(United Kingdom) Adam Morgan	Ret	10	5	4	2^{F}	12	6	2	15	8	12	Ret	6	2	15	10	4	5	11	10	7	7	2	20	10	Ret	7	3	10	7	241
7	(United Kingdom) Tom Chilton	7	6^{F}	1^{FL}	22	12	7	7	3	18	15	Ret	8	5	3	Ret	5	2	8	DSQ	8	5	1^{PFL}	15^{L}	6	20	Ret	8	2	Ret^{L}	Ret	230
8	(United Kingdom) Charles Rainford	17	Ret	16	2^{F}	7	1^{L}	12	9	7	17	11	19	11	DSQ	9	8	6	13	2^{PFL}	16	8	13	17	10	14	5	12	4^{F}	Ret	11	179
9	(United Kingdom) Gordon Shedden	19	11	13	21	16	10	Ret	DSQ	12	18	19	10	16	9	1^{L}	11	7	4	15	13	10	12	3	7	3^{L}	7	16	7	4	4	177
10	(United Kingdom) Senna Proctor										9	6	4	8	8	5	3	19	3	4	4	13	8	Ret	15	4	16	13	13	3	8	167
11	(United Kingdom) Aiden Moffat	9	7	9	20	5	8	DSQ	16	10	14	13	12	15	16	11	13	9	6^{L}	6	7	9	15	11	13	6	8	6	20	9	5^{L}	166
12	(United Kingdom) Josh Cook	6	20	11	15	6	6	11	7	3	3^{F}	DSQ	7	9	7	Ret							18	6	11	5	9	2	11	8	1^{L}	160
13	(Philippines) Daryl De Leon	15	12	15	7	1^{L}	13	10	15	19	10	9	14	18	15	14	6	3	Ret	8^{L}	6	Ret^{L}	11	5	9	13^{P}	10	20	Ret^{P}	13	13	149
14	(United Kingdom) Chris Smiley	10	8	8	12	4	5	8	5^{F}	Ret	11	8	DSQ	3	14	Ret	Ret	13	Ret	12	12	11	9	DSQ	21	15	15	18	10	11	12	140
15	(United Kingdom) Daniel Lloyd	12	Ret	Ret	9	21	22	5	4	16	13	10	9	12	Ret	13	9	15	DNS	16	15	12	14	10	8	1^{FL}	6	17	8	15	17	128
16	(United Kingdom) Sam Osborne	16	DNS	18	8	17	18	13	8	5	Ret	20	11	20	12	10	14	12	7	10	22	16	16	13	14	19	12	1^{L}	15	12	9	108
17	(Republic of Ireland) Árón Taylor-Smith	Ret	Ret	12	16	15	15	14	12	11	12	17	6	13	Ret	DNS	7	21	9	9	11	Ret	10	7^{F}	4	11	4	11	12	Ret	Ret	103
18	(United Kingdom) Mikey Doble	5	16	7	6	22	20	9	6	1^{L}	Ret	Ret	13	17	11	Ret	15	14	10	17	18	15	17	14	17	21	11	10	14	14	14	100
19	(United Kingdom) James Dorlin	Ret	14	21	17	18	11	15	14	Ret	7	7	Ret	10	13	8	18	16	Ret	18	14	17										47
20	(United Kingdom) Dexter Patterson	11	9	Ret	19	Ret	21	19	20	13	20	15	16	Ret	19	DSQ	12	11	11	13	17	14	19	16	16	17	17	15	16	16	10	42
21	(United Kingdom) Ronan Pearson	13	18	14	11	10	17	17	13	8	16	14	Ret																			29
22	(United Kingdom) Max Buxton																19	18	12	19	19	Ret	21	19	18	16	13	19	17	17	15	8
23	(United Kingdom) Max Hall	14	13	20	23	Ret	Ret	Ret	21	14	Ret	DNS	DNS	Ret	18	Ret																7
24	(United Kingdom) Stephen Jelley	20	15	17	14	13	19	Ret	17	Ret	19	16	15	21	NC	Ret	16	17	Ret													7
25	(United Kingdom) Michael Crees	18	17	19	13	14	16																									5
26	(United Kingdom) Finn Leslie													23	17	12																4
27	(United Kingdom) Nick Halstead				24	20	24	Ret	23	21	WD	WD	WD	22	Ret	DNS	17	20	14	Ret	21	19	22	18	Ret	18	14	NC	21	18	18	4
28	(United Kingdom) Nicolas Hamilton	21	19	22	Ret	19	23	18	22	22	Ret	18	17	19	20	Ret	Ret	22	Ret	Ret	20	18	20	20	19	Ret	WD	WD	18	19	16	0
29	(United Kingdom) Ryan Bensley							16	18	20																						0
Pos.	Driver	DPN			BHI			SNE			THR			OUL			CRO			KNO			DPGP			SIL			BHGP			Pts

Colour	Result
Gold	Winner
Silver	Second place
Bronze	Third place
Green	Points classification
Blue	Non-points classification
Blue	Non-classified finish (NC)
Purple	Retired, not classified (Ret)
Red	Did not qualify (DNQ)
Red	Did not pre-qualify (DNPQ)
Black	Disqualified (DSQ)
White	Did not start (DNS)
White	Withdrew (WD)
White	Race cancelled (C)
Blank	Did not practice (DNP)
Blank	Did not arrive (DNA)
Blank	Excluded (EX)

=== Manufacturers'/Constructors' Championship ===
Pos.	Manufacturer	Constructor	Points
1	Hyundai	EXCELR8 Motorsport	842
2	Ford	Alliance Racing	839
3	BMW	West Surrey Racing	700
4	Toyota	Speedworks Motorsport	519

=== Teams' Championship ===
Pos.	Team	Points
1	NAPA Racing UK	775
2	Team VERTU	773
3	LKQ Euro Car Parts Racing with WSR	462
4	Restart Racing	386
5	Laser Tools Racing with MB Motorsport	319
5	Toyota Gazoo Racing UK with IAA	266
7	West Surrey Racing	215
8	Motor Parts Direct with Power Maxed Racing	190
9	One Motorsport	156
10	ROKiT Racing with Un-Limited Motorsport	144
11	Powder Monkey Brewing Co with Esidock	32

=== Independent Drivers' Championship ===
Pos.	Driver	DPN			BHI			SNE			THR			OUL			CRO			KNO			DPGP			SIL			BHGP			Pts
1	(United Kingdom) Daniel Lloyd	12	Ret	Ret	9	21	22	5	4	16	13	10	9	12	Ret	13	9	15	DNS	16	15	12	14	10	8	1	6	17	8	15	17	423
2	(United Kingdom) Mikey Doble	5	16	7	6	22	20	9	6	1^{L}	Ret	Ret	13	17	11	Ret	15	14	10	17	18	15	17	14	17	21	11	10	14	14	14	419
3	(United Kingdom) Chris Smiley	10	8	8	12	4	5	8	5^{F}	Ret	11	8	DSQ	3	14	Ret	Ret	13	Ret	12	12	11	9	DSQ	21	15	15	18	10	11	12	418
4	(United Kingdom) Dexter Patterson	11	9	Ret	19	Ret	21	19	20	13	20	15	16	Ret	19	DSQ	12	11	11	13	17	14	19	16	16	17	17	15	16	16	10	369
5	(United Kingdom) Nicolas Hamilton	21	19	22	Ret	19	23	18	22	22	Ret	18	17	19	20	Ret	Ret	22	Ret	Ret	20	18	20	20	19	Ret	DNS	DNS	18	19	16	220
6	(United Kingdom) Josh Cook	6	20	11	15	6	6	11	7	3	3^{F}	DSQ	7	9	7	Ret																206
7	(United Kingdom) Nick Halstead				24	20	24	Ret	23	21	WD	WD	WD	22	Ret	DNS	17	20	14	Ret	21	19	22	18	Ret	18	14	NC	21	18	18	191
8	(United Kingdom) Stephen Jelley	20	15	17	14	13	19	Ret	17	Ret	19	16	15	21	NC	Ret	16	17	Ret													162
9	(United Kingdom) Max Hall	14	13	20	23	Ret	Ret	Ret	21	14	Ret	DNS	DNS	Ret	18	Ret																80
Pos.	Driver	DPN			BHI			SNE			THR			OUL			CRO			KNO			DPGP			SIL			BHGP			Pts

=== Independent Teams' Championship ===
Pos.	Team	Points
1	Restart Racing	540
2	Motor Parts Direct with Power Maxed Racing	437
3	ROkiT Racing with Un-Limited Motorsport	417
4	Powder Monkey Brewing Co with Esidock	259
5	One Motorsport	235

=== Jack Sears Trophy ===
Pos.	Driver	DPN			BHI			SNE			THR			OUL			CRO			KNO			DPGP			SIL			BHGP			Pts
1	(Philippines) Daryl De Leon	15	12	15	7	1^{L}	13	10	15	19	10	9	14	18	15	14	6	3	Ret	8	6	Ret	11	5	9	13	10	20	Ret	13	13	447
2	(United Kingdom) Charles Rainford	17	Ret	16	2^{F}	7	1^{L}	12	9	7	17	11	19	11	DSQ	9	8	6	13	2	16	8	13	17	10	14	5	12	4	Ret	11	444
3	(United Kingdom) Sam Osborne	16	DNS	18	8	17	18	13	8	5	Ret	20	11	20	12	10	14	12	7	10	22	16	16	13	14	19	12	1	15	12	9	426
4	(United Kingdom) Dexter Patterson	11	9	Ret	19	Ret	21	19	20	13	20	15	16	Ret	19	DSQ	12	11	11	13	17	14	19	16	16	17	17	15	16	16	10	353
5	(United Kingdom) James Dorlin	Ret	14	21	17	18	11	15	14	Ret	7	7	Ret	10	13	8	18	16	Ret	18	14	17										247
6	(United Kingdom) Nicolas Hamilton	21	19	22	Ret	19	23	18	22	22	Ret	18	17	19	20	Ret	Ret	22	Ret	Ret	20	18	20	20	19	Ret	DNS	DNS	18	19	16	205
7	(United Kingdom) Nick Halstead				24	20	24	Ret	23	21	WD	WD	WD	22	Ret	DNS	17	20	14	Ret	21	19	22	18	Ret	18	14	NC	21	18	18	166
8	(United Kingdom) Max Buxton																19	18	12	19	19	Ret	21	19	18	16	13	19	17	17	15	164
9	(United Kingdom) Ronan Pearson	13	18	14	11	10	17	17	13	8	16	14	Ret																			157
10	(United Kingdom) Max Hall	14	13	20	23	Ret	Ret	Ret	21	14	Ret	DNS	DNS	Ret	18	Ret																80
11	(United Kingdom) Finn Leslie													23	17	12																35
12	(United Kingdom) Ryan Bensley							16	18	20																						30
Pos.	Driver	DPN			BHI			SNE			THR			OUL			CRO			KNO			DPGP			SIL			BHGP			Pts
