= 2025 TCR UK Touring Car Championship =

Motor racing competition

The 2025 TCR UK Touring Car Championship was the seventh season of the TCR UK Touring Car Championship. The championship featured production-based touring cars built to TCR specifications. The championship was operated by Stewart Lines' Maximum Group in partnership with the British Automobile Racing Club.

== Calendar ==
The schedule for 2025 was announced on 17 December 2024 containing 17 races across 7 rounds.

Rnd.		Circuit/Location	Date
1	1	Donington Park (National), Leicestershire	22–23 March
1	2	Donington Park (National), Leicestershire	22–23 March
1	3	Donington Park (National), Leicestershire	22–23 March
2	4	Donington Park (GP), Leicestershire	5–6 April
2	5	Donington Park (GP), Leicestershire	5–6 April
3	6	Silverstone Circuit (National), Northamptonshire	17–18 May
3	7	Silverstone Circuit (National), Northamptonshire	17–18 May
3	8	Silverstone Circuit (National), Northamptonshire	17–18 May
4	9	Croft Circuit, North Yorkshire	14–15 June
4	10	Croft Circuit, North Yorkshire	14–15 June
4	11	Croft Circuit, North Yorkshire	14–15 June
5	12	Oulton Park (Island), Cheshire	5 July
5	13	Oulton Park (Island), Cheshire	5 July
6	14	Snetterton Circuit (300 Circuit), Norfolk)	13–14 September
6	15	Snetterton Circuit (300 Circuit), Norfolk)	13–14 September
7	16	Brands Hatch (Indy), Kent	1–2 November
7	17	Brands Hatch (Indy), Kent	1–2 November

== Teams and drivers ==
Team	Car	No.	Drivers	Class	Rounds
Gen-2 Entries
(United Kingdom) Area Motorsport	Audi RS 3 LMS TCR (2021)	6	(United Kingdom) Bradley Burns		2
(United Kingdom) Area Motorsport	Hyundai i30 N TCR	45	(United Kingdom) Alistair Camp		1–2
(United Kingdom) Area Motorsport	Cupra León VZ TCR	100	(United Kingdom) Steve Laidlaw	D	All
(United Kingdom) Area Motorsport	Cupra León VZ TCR	101	(United Kingdom) Sam Laidlaw		All
(United Kingdom) JH Racing	Hyundai Elantra N TCR (2024)	16	(United Kingdom) Callum Newsham		6–7
(United Kingdom) JH Racing	Hyundai i30 N TCR	16	(United Kingdom) Callum Newsham		1–5
(United Kingdom) JH Racing	Hyundai i30 N TCR	22	(United Kingdom) Rick Kerry	D	7
(United Kingdom) JH Racing	Hyundai i30 N TCR	81	(United Kingdom) Stewart Lines	D	2, 5
(United Kingdom) JH Racing	Hyundai i30 N TCR	8	(Republic of Ireland) Rod McGovern	D	1
(United Kingdom) Power Maxed Racing	Cupra León Competición TCR	8	(Republic of Ireland) Rod McGovern	D	3, 5
(United Kingdom) Power Maxed Racing	Hyundai i30 N TCR	26	(United Kingdom) Finn Leslie		1–5
(United Kingdom) Power Maxed Racing	Hyundai i30 N TCR	11	(United Kingdom) Harry Bloor		1–5
(United Kingdom) Vannin Motorsport	Cupra León Competición TCR	11	(United Kingdom) Harry Bloor		6–7
(United Kingdom) Vannin Motorsport	Audi RS 3 LMS TCR (2021)	96	(United Kingdom) Jordan Kerridge		4–5, 7
(United Kingdom) Vannin Motorsport with RS Vehicle Sales	Audi RS 3 LMS TCR (2021)	115	(United Kingdom) Luke Sargeant		2–3, 6–7
(United Kingdom) Vannin Motorsport with DW Racing	Audi RS 3 LMS TCR (2021)	50	(United Kingdom) George Jaxon		3
(United Kingdom) Vannin Motorsport with DW Racing	Audi RS 3 LMS TCR (2021)	28	(United Kingdom) George Jaxon		2, 4–5
(United Kingdom) Vannin Motorsport with DW Racing	Cupra León VZ TCR	28	(United Kingdom) George Jaxon		6–7
(United Kingdom) Bond-It with MPH Racing	Cupra León Competición TCR	17	(United Kingdom) Bradley Hutchison		All
(United Kingdom) Capture Motorsport	Cupra León Competición TCR	27	(United Kingdom) Will Beech	D	All
(United Kingdom) Capture Motorsport	Cupra León Competición TCR	34	(United Kingdom) Gregory Saunders		All
(United Kingdom) Capture Motorsport	Cupra León Competición TCR	117	(United Kingdom) Adam Shepherd		1–2
(United Kingdom) Capture Motorsport	Cupra León VZ TCR	117	(United Kingdom) Adam Shepherd		3–7
(United Kingdom) BSR with Richmond Fire	Cupra León Competición TCR	77	(United Kingdom) Mark Smith	D	All
(United Kingdom) BSR with Richmond Fire	Lynk & Co 03 TCR	93	(United Kingdom) Max Hall		6–7
(United Kingdom) Maximum Motorsport with BSR	Lynk & Co 03 TCR	81	(United Kingdom) Stewart Lines	D	1
(United Kingdom) Maximum Motorsport with BSR	Lynk & Co 03 TCR	111	(United Kingdom) Ryan Bensley	D	2
(United Kingdom) Motion Motorsport	Lynk & Co 03 TCR	111	(United Kingdom) Ryan Bensley	D	3
Gen-1 Entries
(United Kingdom) DW Racing	Volkswagen Golf GTI TCR	7	(United Kingdom) Alex Jones		3–7
(United Kingdom) DW Racing	Volkswagen Golf GTI TCR	28	(United Kingdom) George Jaxon		1
(United Kingdom) DW Racing	Vauxhall Astra TCR	50	(United Kingdom) Darelle Wilson		7
(United Kingdom) Simon Green Motorsport	Audi RS 3 LMS TCR (2017)	12	(France) Cedric Bloch		1, 7
(United Kingdom) Power Maxed Racing	Audi RS 3 LMS TCR (2017)	19	(United Kingdom) Jeffrey Alden	D	1–3
(United Kingdom) Matrix Motorsport	Opel Astra TCR	19	(United Kingdom) Jeffrey Alden	D	6–7
(United Kingdom) JamSport Racing	Subaru WRX STI TCR	272	(United Kingdom) Jenson O’Neill-Going		7

Icon	Class
D	Eligible for Goodyear Diamond Trophy

== Championship standings ==
Points system
Position	**1st**	**2nd**	**3rd**	**4th**	**5th**	**6th**	**7th**	**8th**	**9th**	**10th**	**11th**	**12th**	**13th**	**14th**	**15th**	Fastest lap
Qualifying	6	5	4	3	2	1	—N/a									
Race	40	35	30	27	24	21	18	15	13	11	9	7	5	3	1	1

=== Drivers' standings ===
Pos	Driver	DON1			DON2		SIL			CRO			OUL		SNE		BHI		Total	Drop	Points
1	(United Kingdom) Adam Shepherd	**1**^{1}	1	3	**2**^{1}	2	6^{3}	5	3	**1**^{1}	DSQ	1	**1**^{1}	1	**1**^{1}	4	**1**^{1}	6	588	58	530
2	(United Kingdom) Callum Newsham	Ret^{2}	2	1	9^{4}	Ret	2^{2}	2	1	2^{2}	1	2	3^{5}	2	2	Ret	2^{2}	1	512		512
3	(United Kingdom) Sam Laidlaw	2^{4}	5	5	8^{3}	1	3^{4}	Ret	4	5^{4}	3	3	4^{2}	6	5^{4}	5	3^{4}	2	472	19	453
4	(United Kingdom) Bradley Hutchison	Ret^{5}	Ret	14	1^{2}	4	4^{6}	3	5	3^{5}	Ret	4	2^{4}	3	4^{6}	2	4^{6}	5	406	6	400
5	(United Kingdom) Steve Laidlaw	3^{6}	3	4	4^{5}	10	**1**^{1}	1	2	10^{3}	9	DNS	6^{3}	4	6^{5}	Ret	WD	WD	360	6	354
6	(United Kingdom) Finn Leslie	4	4	2	6	8	Ret	6	8	4^{6}	2	Ret	5^{6}	5					279		279
7	(United Kingdom) George Jaxon	NC	11	12	13	12	9	4	9	7	6	5	12	8	7^{2}	1	5^{5}	3	284	7	277
8	(United Kingdom) Will Beech	10	7	9	12	9	7	7	Ret	6	4	8	7	Ret	8	6	7	Ret	238		238
9	(United Kingdom) Mark Smith	6	12	10	14	14	10	10	13	11	7	7	10	11	9	9	9	11	193	10	183
10	(United Kingdom) Gregory Saunders	7	6	8	15	15	Ret	9	11	8	10	Ret	8	9	WD	WD	10	8	167	6	161
11	(United Kingdom) Harry Bloor	11	14	6	10	13	13	11	12	9	5	Ret	Ret	Ret	10	8	Ret	9	153		153
12	(Republic of Ireland) Rod McGovern	5	8	7			8	8	7				9	7					136		136
13	(United Kingdom) Luke Sargeant				7	7	5^{5}	Ret	6						Ret	7	6	Ret	129	6	123
14	(United Kingdom) Max Hall														3^{3}	3	Ret^{3}	4	97		97
15	(United Kingdom) Jeff Alden	8	10	11	WD	WD	11	12	14						12	10	14	13	88		88
16	(United Kingdom) Jordan Kerridge									12	8	6	11	12			12	10	83		83
17	(United Kingdom) Ryan Bensley				5	6	Ret	Ret	10										62		62
18	(United Kingdom) Stewart Lines	DNS	9	13	11	11							13	10					56		56
19	(United Kingdom) Alex Jones						12	13	15	13	11	DNS	WD	WD	11	11	Ret	Ret	45		45
20	(France) Cedric Bloch	9	13	Ret													13	14	34		34
21	(United Kingdom) Alistair Camp	Ret^{3}	Ret	Ret	Ret^{6}	5													32		32
Drivers ineligible to score points
	(United Kingdom) Bradley Burns				3	3															
	(United Kingdom) Rick Kerry																8	7			
	(United Kingdom) Darelle Wilson																11	15			
	(United Kingdom) Jenson O’Neill-Going																Ret	12			
Pos	Driver	DON1			DON2		SIL			CRO			OUL		SNE		BHI		Total	Drop	Points

Key
Colour	Result
Gold	Winner
Silver	Second place
Bronze	Third place
Green	Other points position
Blue	Other classified position
Blue	Not classified, finished (NC)
Purple	Not classified, retired (Ret)
Red	Did not qualify (DNQ)
Red	Did not pre-qualify (DNPQ)
Black	Disqualified (DSQ)
White	Did not start (DNS)
White	Race cancelled (C)
Blank	Did not practice (DNP)
Blank	Excluded (EX)
Blank	Did not arrive (DNA)
Blank	Withdrawn (WD)
Blank	Did not enter (cell empty)
Text formatting	Meaning
**Bold**	Pole position
Italics	Fastest lap

^{1 2 3 4 5 6} – Qualifying position
