= Finn Leslie =

British racing driver (born 2008)

- Born: Finn David Leslie; 26 February 2008 (age 18); Wakefield, United Kingdom
- Nationality: (United Kingdom) British

Championship titles
- 2024: BRSCC Fiesta Junior Championship – MK7

Finn David Leslie (born 26 February 2008) is a British racing driver who last competed for Power Maxed Racing in the TCR UK Touring Car Championship.

== Career ==
Leslie began karting in 2016. During his karting career, Leslie won the 2019–20 Wombwell Karting Winter Series in the IAME class, before winning the Mini Max Kartmasters Grand Prix in 2021. In his final year of karting in 2023, Leslie raced in the Ultimate Karting Championship's Junior Max class, taking three wins before leaving the series with two rounds remaining.

Leslie made his car racing debut in the BRSCC Fiesta Junior Championship in 2023, competing at both the Silverstone and Donington Park rounds. In the former, he finished second overall on debut and won the MK7 class, before taking the overall win in race two and ending off his cameo with another overall win in the sole race at Donington Park. Remaining in the BRSCC Fiesta Junior Championship for the following year, Leslie took three overall wins to finish the season runner-up in the overall points, whilst also clinching the MK7 title by one point over Jacob Hodgkiss.

The following year, Leslie stepped up to the TCR UK Touring Car Championship by joining Power Maxed Racing as part of the series' first ever Junior Driver Programme. Having finished fourth in his first two races at the first Donington Park round, before taking his maiden series podium in race three by finishing second behind Callum Newsham. After finishing no higher than sixth in the following two rounds, Leslie took his second podium of the season in the second race at Croft by once again finishing second to Newsham, after race winner Adam Shepherd was disqualified. Leslie then finished fifth in both races at Oulton Park, which turned out to be his last round of the season, as Power Maxed Racing skipped the final two rounds following a fire to their base, thus ending the year sixth in points. During 2025, Leslie joined Toyota Gazoo Racing UK with IAA to make his debut in the British Touring Car Championship at Oulton Park. On his debut, Leslie finished 23rd and two laps down, before finishing 17th in race two and taking his first points in race three by finishing 12th.

== Karting record ==
=== Karting career summary ===
| Season | Series | Team | Position |
|---|---|---|---|
| 2017 | South Yorkshire Kart Club — IAME Cadet | | 12th |
| 2018 | Wombwell Karting Winter Series — IAME | | 6th |
| 2018 | South Yorkshire Kart Club — IAME Cadet | | 2nd |
| 2019 | Wombwell Karting Championship — IAME Cadet | | 3rd |
| 2019 | Manchester & Buxton Kart Club — IAME Cadet | | 8th |
| 2019–20 | Wombwell Karting Winter Series — IAME | | 1st |
| 2020 | Warden Law Kart Club — IAME Cadet | | 4th |
| 2020 | Wombwell Karting Championship — IAME Cadet | | 9th |
| 2020 | Ultimate Karting Championship — IAME Super Cadet | | 20th |
| 2020 | Cumbria Kart Racing Club Gold Cup — IAME Cadet | | 4th |
| 2021 | Ultimate Karting Championship — Mini X30 | | 6th |
| 2021 | Kartmasters Grand Prix — Mini Max | | 1st |
| 2022 | The Kart Championship Winter Cup — Junior Rotax | | 6th |
| 2022 | British Kart Championship — Rotax Mini | Kato Motorsport | 6th |
| 2022 | Whilton Mill Kart Club — Junior Max | | 50th |
| 2022 | Whilton Mill Kart Club — Mini Max | | 31st |
| 2022 | Ultimate Karting Championship — Mini Max | | 3rd |
| 2023 | Ultimate Karting Championship — Junior Rotax | Kato Motorsport | 13th |
| 2023 | Manchester & Buxton Kart Club Gold Cup — Rotax Junior Max | | NC |

== Racing record ==
=== Racing career summary ===
| Season | Series | Team | Races | Wins | Poles | F/Laps | Podiums | Points | Position |
|---|---|---|---|---|---|---|---|---|---|
| 2023 | BRSCC Fiesta Junior Championship | | 3 | 2 | 0 | 1 | 3 | 0 | 28th |
| 2024 | BRSCC Fiesta Junior Championship | 20 Ten Racing | 21 | 3 | 1 | 5 | 11 | 526 | **2nd** |
| 2025 | TCR UK Touring Car Championship | Power Maxed Racing | 14 | 0 | 0 | 0 | 2 | 279 | 6th |
| 2025 | British Touring Car Championship | Toyota Gazoo Racing UK with IAA | 3 | 0 | 0 | 0 | 0 | 4 | 26th |

* Season still in progress.

=== Complete TCR UK Touring Car Championship results ===
(key) (Races in bold indicate pole position) (Races in italics indicate fastest lap)

| Year | Team | Car | 1 | 2 | 3 | 4 | 5 | 6 | 7 | 8 | 9 | 10 | 11 | 12 | 13 | 14 | 15 | 16 | 17 | Pos | Pts |
|---|---|---|---|---|---|---|---|---|---|---|---|---|---|---|---|---|---|---|---|---|---|
| 2025 | Power Maxed Racing | Hyundai i30 N TCR | DON1; 1; 4 | DON1; 2; 4 | DON1; 3; 2 | DON2; 1; 6 | DON2; 2; 8 | SIL; 1 Ret | SIL; 2; 6 | SIL; 3; 8 | CRO; 1; 4^{6} | CRO; 2; 2 | CRO; 3 Ret | OUL; 1; 5^{6} | OUL; 2; 5 | SNE; 1 | SNE; 2 | BHI; 1 | BHI; 2 | 6th | 279 |

=== Complete British Touring Car Championship results ===
(key) Races in bold indicate pole position (1 point awarded – 2002–2003 all races, 2004–present just in first race) Races in italics indicate fastest lap (1 point awarded all races) * signifies that driver lead race for at least one lap (1 point awarded – 2002 just in feature races, 2003–present all races)

| Year | Team | Car | 1 | 2 | 3 | 4 | 5 | 6 | 7 | 8 | 9 | 10 | 11 | 12 | 13 | 14 | 15 | 16 | 17 | 18 | 19 | 20 | 21 | 22 | 23 | 24 | 25 | 26 | 27 | 28 | 29 | 30 | DC | Points |
|---|---|---|---|---|---|---|---|---|---|---|---|---|---|---|---|---|---|---|---|---|---|---|---|---|---|---|---|---|---|---|---|---|---|---|
| 2025 | Toyota Gazoo Racing UK with IAA | Toyota Corolla GR Sport | DON; 1 | DON; 2 | DON; 3 | BRH; 1 | BRH; 2 | BRH; 3 | SNE; 1 | SNE; 2 | SNE; 3 | THR; 1 | THR; 2 | THR; 3 | OUL; 1; 23 | OUL; 2; 17 | OUL; 3; 12 | CRO; 1 | CRO; 2 | CRO; 3 | KNO; 1 | KNO; 2 | KNO; 3 | DON; 1 | DON; 2 | DON; 3 | SIL; 1 | SIL; 2 | SIL; 3 | BRH; 1 | BRH; 2 | BRH; 3 | 26th | 4 |
