= 2021 Porsche Carrera Cup Great Britain =

19th Porsche Carrera Cup Great Britain season

The 2021 Porsche Carrera Cup Great Britain was a multi-event, one-make motor racing championship held across England and Scotland. The championship featured a mix of professional motor racing teams and privately funded drivers, competing in Porsche 991 GT3 Cup cars that conformed to the technical regulations for the championship. It formed part of the extensive program of support categories built up around the BTCC centrepiece. The 2021 season was the 19th Porsche Carrera Cup Great Britain season, commencing on 12 June at Snetterton and finishing on 24 October at Brands Hatch, utilising the Grand Prix circuit, after sixteen races at eight meetings. All sixteen of the races were held in support of the 2021 British Touring Car Championship.

== Teams and drivers ==
The following teams and drivers are currently signed to run the 2021 season.

Team	No.	Driver		Rounds
Pro Class
Richardson Racing	10	(United Kingdom) Will Martin		All
Richardson Racing	91	(United Kingdom) Will Bratt		All
Redline Racing	11	(United Kingdom) Matthew Graham		6
Redline Racing	32	(United Kingdom) James Dorlin	R	1
Redline Racing	57	(United Kingdom) Dan Cammish		All
Team Parker Racing	19	(United Kingdom) Harry King		All
Team Parker Racing	26	(United Kingdom) Kiern Jewiss	R	All
JTR	23	(United Kingdom) Lorcan Hanafin		All
JTR	71	(United Kingdom) Jamie Orton		All
Valuga Racing	59	(United Kingdom) Ross Wylie		6–8
Valuga Racing	77	(United Kingdom) Lewis Plato		1–6
Richardson Racing	90	(United Kingdom) Josh Malin	R	All
Pro-Am Class
Redline Racing	3	(United Kingdom) Jake Rattenbury	R	All
Redline Racing	14	(United Kingdom) Josh Caygill	R	1–4, 7–8
Redline Racing	28	(United Kingdom) Micah Stanley	R	All
Brookspeed	18	(United Kingdom) Archie Hamilton	R	1–3
Team HARD	27	(United Kingdom) Nathan Harrison	R	All
JTR	29	(Spain) Pepe Massot		6–7
Team Parker Racing	33	(United Kingdom) Ryan Ratcliffe		All
CCK Motorsport	99	(United Kingdom) Charles Rainford	R	All
Am Class
Team Parker Racing	6	(United Kingdom) Justin Armstrong		All
Team Parker Racing	7	(United Kingdom) Justin Sherwood		All
Valuga Racing	8	(United Kingdom) Adam Knight		1–2
Valuga Racing	12	(United Kingdom) Ian Humphris		7
Valuga Racing	24	(United Kingdom) Lucky Khera		6–8
G-Cat Racing	22	(United Kingdom) David Shaw		1, 6–8
Redline Racing	69	(United Kingdom) Marcus Fothergill	R	5
Team HARD	95	(United Kingdom) Josh Stanton	R	All

== Race Calendar ==
Round		Circuit	Date	Pole position	Fastest lap	Winning Pro	Winning team	Winning Pro-Am	Winning Am
1	R1	Snetterton Circuit	12-13 June	(United Kingdom) Lorcan Hanafin	(United Kingdom) Lorcan Hanafin	(United Kingdom) Dan Cammish	Redline Racing	(United Kingdom) Micah Stanley	(United Kingdom) Justin Sherwood
1	R2	Snetterton Circuit	12-13 June		(United Kingdom) Dan Cammish	(United Kingdom) Kiern Jewiss	Team Parker Racing	(United Kingdom) Ryan Ratcliffe	(United Kingdom) Justin Sherwood
2	R3	Brands Hatch Indy	26-27 June	(United Kingdom) Dan Cammish	(United Kingdom) Dan Cammish	(United Kingdom) Lorcan Hanafin	JTR	(United Kingdom) Charles Rainford	(United Kingdom) Justin Sherwood
2	R4	Brands Hatch Indy	26-27 June		(United Kingdom) Dan Cammish	(United Kingdom) Will Martin	Richardson Racing	(United Kingdom) Ryan Ratcliffe	(United Kingdom) Justin Sherwood
3	R5	Oulton Park	31 July-1 August	(United Kingdom) Lorcan Hanafin	(United Kingdom) Lorcan Hanafin	(United Kingdom) Lorcan Hanafin	JTR	(United Kingdom) Micah Stanley	(United Kingdom) Justin Armstrong
3	R6	Oulton Park	31 July-1 August		(United Kingdom) Dan Cammish	(United Kingdom) Kiern Jewiss	Team Parker Racing	(United Kingdom) Ryan Ratcliffe	(United Kingdom) Justin Sherwood
4	R7	Knockhill Racing Circuit	14-15 August	(United Kingdom) Will Martin	(United Kingdom) Lorcan Hanafin	(United Kingdom) Lorcan Hanafin	JTR	(United Kingdom) Charles Rainford	(United Kingdom) Justin Sherwood
4	R8	Knockhill Racing Circuit	14-15 August		(United Kingdom) Lewis Plato	(United Kingdom) Harry King	Team Parker Racing	(United Kingdom) Jake Rattenbury	(United Kingdom) Justin Sherwood
5	R9	Croft Circuit	18-19 September	(United Kingdom) Dan Cammish	(United Kingdom) Dan Cammish	(United Kingdom) Dan Cammish	Redline Racing	(United Kingdom) Nathan Harrison	(United Kingdom) Justin Sherwood
5	R10	Croft Circuit	18-19 September		(United Kingdom) Will Martin	(United Kingdom) Kiern Jewiss	Team Parker Racing	(United Kingdom) Nathan Harrison	(United Kingdom) Justin Armstrong
6	R11	Silverstone Circuit	25-26 September	(United Kingdom) Lorcan Hanafin	(United Kingdom) Harry King	(United Kingdom) Harry King	Team Parker Racing	(Spain) Pepe Massot	(United Kingdom) Josh Stanton
6	R12	Silverstone Circuit	25-26 September		(United Kingdom) Lorcan Hanafin	(United Kingdom) Dan Cammish	Redline Racing	(United Kingdom) Charles Rainford	(United Kingdom) Justin Armstrong
7	R13	Donington Park	9-10 October	(United Kingdom) Harry King	(United Kingdom) Harry King	(United Kingdom) Harry King	Team Parker Racing	(United Kingdom) Micah Stanley	(United Kingdom) Justin Sherwood
7	R14	Donington Park	9-10 October		(United Kingdom) Josh Malin	(United Kingdom) Kiern Jewiss	Team Parker Racing	(United Kingdom) Micah Stanley	(United Kingdom) Josh Stanton
8	R15	Brands Hatch GP	23-24 October	(United Kingdom) Harry King	(United Kingdom) Harry King	(United Kingdom) Lorcan Hanafin	JTR	(United Kingdom) Ryan Ratcliffe	(United Kingdom) Josh Stanton
8	R16	Brands Hatch GP	23-24 October		(United Kingdom) Will Martin	(United Kingdom) Will Martin	Richardson Racing	(United Kingdom) Charles Rainford	(United Kingdom) Josh Stanton

== Championship standings ==
Points system
	1st	2nd	3rd	4th	5th	6th	7th	8th	PP	FL
Race 1 (Pro)	12	10	8	6	4	3	2	1	2	1
Race 2 (All Classes)	10	8	6	5	4	3	2	1	0	1

=== Drivers' championships ===
Pos	Driver	SNE		BHI		OUL		KNO		CRO		SILN		DON		BHGP		Pts
Pro Class
1	(United Kingdom) Dan Cammish	1	2	10	3	2	5	4	3	1	2	4	1	2	3	3	3	123
2	(United Kingdom) Lorcan Hanafin	3	5	1	7	1	Ret	1	5	2	Ret	2	2	4	5	1	11	116
3	(United Kingdom) Kiern Jewiss	4	1	2	4	5	1	5	Ret	4	1	3	7	3	1	5	4	104
4	(United Kingdom) Harry King	2	3	Ret	2	6	4	2	1	12	Ret	1	4	1	4	6	5	94
5	(United Kingdom) Will Martin	5	DSQ	3	1	3	3	9	6	3	4	6	3	Ret	6	2	1	86
6	(United Kingdom) Lewis Plato	6	4	4	5	4	2	3	4	5	3	Ret	8					59
7	(United Kingdom) Josh Malin	8	7	5	6	8	6	6	2	8	8	13	9	5	2	15	9	48
8	(United Kingdom) Jamie Orton	9	6	6	Ret	9	7	13	7	Ret	7	11	10	19	12	4	2	33
9	(United Kingdom) Will Bratt	11	9	Ret	13	7	Ret	10	8	7	6	10	11	7	9	10	17	24
10	(United Kingdom) James Dorlin	7	11															2
	(United Kingdom) Matthew Graham*											5	5					
	(United Kingdom) Ross Wylie*											7	6	6	7	9	8	
Pro-Am Class
1	(United Kingdom) Ryan Ratcliffe	13	8	8	8	11	8	8	11	9	10	14	14	11	10	8	7	123
2	(United Kingdom) Micah Stanley	10	12	14	10	10	9	16	10	13	11	Ret	DNS	8	8	11	12	100
3	(United Kingdom) Charles Rainford	15	13	7	Ret	16	17	7	Ret	10	Ret	12	12	10	14	7	6	94
4	(United Kingdom) Nathan Harrison	12	10	11	11	12	10	Ret	Ret	6	5	9	Ret	9	11	DSQ	Ret	88
5	(United Kingdom) Jake Rattenbury	17	21	9	9	19	12	12	9	11	9	DSQ	15	14	15	12	10	77
6	(United Kingdom) Josh Caygill	21	14	12	12	17	13	Ret	14					12	Ret	Ret	13	33
7	(United Kingdom) Archie Hamilton	14	16	18	15	13	11											23
	(Spain) Pepe Massot*											8	13	16	13			
Am Class
1	(United Kingdom) Justin Sherwood	16	15	13	14	15	14	11	12	14	13	Ret	DNS	13	Ret	14	15	139
2	(United Kingdom) Josh Stanton	20	18	16	17	18	15	15	13	15	14	15	17	20	16	13	14	120
3	(United Kingdom) Justin Armstrong	18	17	15	16	14	16	14	Ret	16	12	17	16	15	18	18	Ret	119
4	(United Kingdom) David Shaw	Ret	19									Ret	DNS	18	Ret	17	16	23
5	(United Kingdom) Adam Knight	19	20	17	18													20
	(United Kingdom) Lucky Khera*											16	Ret	17	17	16	Ret	
	(United Kingdom) Marcus Fothergill*									17	Ret							
	(United Kingdom) Ian Humphris*													21	Ret			

* Guest entry - ineligible for points
