= Un-Limited Motorsport =

British motor racing team

- Founded: 2024
- Base: West Kingsdown, Sevenoaks
- Team principal(s): Bob Sharpless
- Founder(s): Bob Sharpless
- Former series: British Touring Car Championship
- Noted drivers: (United Kingdom) Nicolas Hamilton (United Kingdom) Dexter Patterson (United Kingdom) Stephen Jelley (Philippines) Daryl De Leon (United Kingdom) Max Hall

Un-Limited Motorsport, competing under the banners ROKiT Racing with Un-Limited Motorsport and Powder Monkey Brewing Co. with Esidock, is a British motor racing team which most recently competed in the British Touring Car Championship, before withdrawing before the 2026 season. The team was founded from the former Team HARD. team, running a single Cupra León.

The team has only competed in 2 seasons of the British Touring Car Championship as of 2026. The team has ambitions for future racing activities.

== History ==
Prior to the 2024 season, Bob Sharpless announced he would start a BTCC team. Sharpless would then bring over Daryl De Leon from the former Team HARD-ran Cupra. De Leon ran a livery for Duckhams Oils, celebrating 125 years of the oil brand. The team entered a majority of the season as Duckhams Racing with Bartercard, before later replacing the Bartercard name for Un-Limited Motorsport. Daryl De Leon ended his season 15th of the 20 full-time drivers. scoring 48 points.

For 2025, Un-Limited Motorsport saw a shuffle-up. Daryl De Leon would be WSR-bound, with rookie Max Hall replacing him. Scotsman Dexter Patterson joined Hall in the newly named ROKiT Racing with Un-Limited Motorsport team, whilst a returning Nicolas Hamilton entered under the Powder Monkey Brewing Co. with Esidock banner. Patterson and Hall crashed into each other multiple times in their half season together, most notably at Brands Hatch, where both drivers ended up in the gravel at paddock hill bend, and Oulton Park, where Patterson pushed Max Hall into the gravel at lodge corner. Hall was later replaced by Stephen Jelley for Croft onwards, before Jelley and the team mutually agreed to lend their 3rd car to a suffering Power Maxed Racing. Later into 2025, Un-Limited Motorsport hosted arrive and drive sessions, where people would pay money to get hot laps in their turned down Cupra León due to noise restrictions. Both Dexter Patterson and Nicolas Hamilton would coach the drivers. Misha Charoudin was one of the many to pay to get in the Cupra, posting it on his YouTube channel.

Despite best efforts, Un-Limited Motorsport's 2026 season wouldn't start due to budget issues, despite acquiring 2 TBLs. The team later lent their 2nd TBL to Power Maxed Racing's Nick Halstead, who returned mid-season.

== Racing results ==
Year	Team Name	Car	No.	Driver	Races	Wins	Poles	F/Laps	Podiums	Points	DC Pos.	CC Pts	CC Pos.
2024	Duckhams Racing with Un-Limited Motorsport (Note: The team entered as Duckhams Racing with Bartercard in Rounds 1 to 7 and Duckhams Racing with Un-Limited Motorsport in Rounds 8 to 10.)	Cupra León	18	(Philippines) Daryl De Leon	0	0	0	0	0	48	15th	85	9th
2025	ROKiT Racing with Un-Limited Motorsport	Cupra León	12	(United Kingdom) Stephen Jelley	3	0	0	0	0	7 (Note: Jelley competed Rounds 1 to 5 with One Motorsport.)	24th (Note: Jelley competed Rounds 1 to 5 with One Motorsport.)	144	10th
2025	ROKiT Racing with Un-Limited Motorsport	Cupra León	17	(United Kingdom) Dexter Patterson	30	0	0	0	0	42	20th	144	10th
2025	ROKiT Racing with Un-Limited Motorsport	Cupra León	93	(United Kingdom) Max Hall	13	0	0	0	0	7	23rd	144	10th
2025	Powder Monkey Brewing Co. with Esidock	Cupra León	28	(United Kingdom) Nicolas Hamilton	28	0	0	0	0	0	28th	32	11th
