= Max Buxton =

British racing driver (born 2005)

- Buxton at Silverstone Circuit in 2026
- Nationality: (United Kingdom) British
- Born: Max Buxton Holden; 14 August 2005 (age 21) Lancashire, United Kingdom
- Relatives: Danny Buxton (father)

British Touring Car Championship career
- Debut season: 2025
- Current team: Speedworks Corolla Racing
- Car number: 19
- Starts: 27
- Wins: 0
- Podiums: 0
- Poles: 0
- Fastest laps: 0
- Best finish: 22nd in 2025

Previous series
- 2024–2025: Vinyl Detail Fiesta ST150 Challenge
- Statistics up to date as of 13 October 2026.

Max Buxton Holden (born 14 August 2005) is a British racing driver who last competed for Speedworks Corolla Racing in the British Touring Car Championship. He is the son of former BTCC driver Danny Buxton.

== Career ==
Having forgone a career in karts, Buxton made his car racing debut in the Vinyl Detail Fiesta ST150 Challenge in 2024. In his maiden season in cars, he took pole at the first Oulton Park round and scored his season-best result of fourth at the same track, albeit at its second appearance on the calendar.

Buxton remained in the series for 2025, taking two wins in the season-opening round at Snetterton, a feat which he repeated two rounds later at Anglesey to take the points lead with four rounds left. However, Buxton left the series as he joined Toyota Gazoo Racing UK with IAA to make his debut in the British Touring Car Championship. After finishing 19th and 18th in his first two races, Buxton took his first points of the season by finishing 12th in race three at Croft. In the following round at Knockhill, Buxton finished 19th in the first two races before retiring in the third on the opening lap. After not scoring points at Donington Park, Buxton finished 13th in race two at Silverstone, before ending the year by finishing 15th in race three at Brands Hatch en route to a 22nd-place points finish.

The following year, Buxton remained with Speedworks Corolla Racing for his maiden full-time season in the British Touring Car Championship. After taking a best result of 16th three times in the first four rounds, Buxton was replaced by Ryan Bensley for the rest of the season and became the team's reserve driver.

== Personal life ==
Buxton is the son of former racing driver and Speedworks Motorsport head of Motorsport Daniel Buxton.

== Racing record ==
=== Racing career summary ===
Season	Series	Team	Races	Wins	Poles	F/Laps	Podiums	Points	Position
2024	Vinyl Detail Fiesta ST150 Challenge		16	0	1	2	1	347	7th
2025	Vinyl Detail Fiesta ST150 Challenge		8	4	2	2	6	365	9th
2025	British Touring Car Championship	Toyota Gazoo Racing UK with IAA	15	0	0	0	0	8	22nd
2026	British Touring Car Championship	Speedworks Corolla Racing	12	0	0	0	0	0	25th

=== Complete British Touring Car Championship results ===
(key) Races in bold indicate pole position (1 point awarded – 2002–2003 all races, 2004–present just in first race) Races in italics indicate fastest lap (1 point awarded all races) * signifies that driver lead race for at least one lap (1 point awarded – 2002 just in feature races, 2003–present all races; ^{Superscript} number indicates points-scoring qualifying race position)

Year	Team	Car	1	2	3	4	5	6	7	8	9	10	11	12	13	14	15	16	17	18	19	20	21	22	23	24	25	26	27	28	29	30	DC	Points
2025	Toyota Gazoo Racing UK with IAA	Toyota Corolla GR Sport	DON; 1	DON; 2	DON; 3	BRH; 1	BRH; 2	BRH; 3	SNE; 1	SNE; 2	SNE; 3	THR; 1	THR; 2	THR; 3	OUL; 1	OUL; 2	OUL; 3	CRO; 1; 19	CRO; 2; 18	CRO; 3; 12	KNO; 1; 19	KNO; 2; 19	KNO; 3 Ret	DON; 1; 21	DON; 2; 19	DON; 3; 18	SIL; 1; 16	SIL; 2; 13	SIL; 3; 19	BRH; 1; 17	BRH; 2; 17	BRH; 3; 15	22nd	8
2026	Speedworks Corolla Racing	Toyota Corolla GR Sport	DON; 1; 18	DON; 2 Ret	DON; 3; 16	BRH; 1; 18	BRH; 2 Ret	BRH; 3 Ret	SNE; 1; 20	SNE; 2; 18	SNE; 3; 19	OUL; 1; 18	OUL; 2; 16	OUL; 3; 16	THR; 1	THR; 2	THR; 3	KNO; 1	KNO; 2	KNO; 3	DON; 1	DON; 2	DON; 3	CRO; 1	CRO; 2	CRO; 3	SIL; 1	SIL; 2	SIL; 3	BRH; 1	BRH; 2	BRH; 3	25th	0
