= Charles Rainford =

British racing driver (born 1998)

- Rainford at Silverstone Circuit in 2026
- Born: 20 July 1998 (age 28); Horsham, England
- Nationality: (United Kingdom) British

British Touring Car Championship career
- Debut season: 2025
- Current team: WSR
- Car number: 99
- Starts: 60
- Wins: 3
- Podiums: 7
- Poles: 2
- Fastest laps: 4
- Best finish: 8th in 2025

Previous series
- 2021–2024: Porsche Carrera Cup Great Britain

Championship titles
- 2022: Porsche Carrera Cup Great Britain – Pro-Am
- Statistics up to date as of 13 October 2026.

Charles Rainford (born 20 July 1998) is a British racing driver who last competed in the British Touring Car Championship for WSR. He previously competed in the Porsche Carrera Cup Great Britain for CCK Motorsport.

== Personal life ==
Rainford is the son of Shaun Rainford, who runs the Classic Cars of Kent dealership, for which Charles drove for in his four-year tenure in Porsche Carrera Cup Great Britain.

== Career ==
Born in Horsham, Rainford had his first taste of karting at the age of seven, but began racing full-time at the age of 16. Mainly racing cars in his early years, in which Rainford became an ARDS 'A' instructor, he most notably finished second in the Goodwood Revival – St. Mary's Trophy in 2019.

Two years later, Rainford began racing for CCK Motorsport in Porsche Carrera Cup Great Britain. In his first season in the series, Rainford took five Pro-Am wins in the 16-race season, en route to a third-place points finish. During 2021, Rainford partook in a one-off appearance in the Porsche Sprint Challenge France at Le Mans, in which he finished sixth.

Remaining in the series for 2022, Rainford won all but four races in his class and only missed the podium twice to clinch the Pro-Am title at season's end. During 2022, Rainford also finished second in the Sopwith Cup at Goodwood. Across the next two years, he stepped up the Pro class of Porsche Carrera Cup Great Britain, finishing fourth with a win to his name in 2023, before taking two wins and coming runner-up to George Gamble by seven points the following year.

Rainford stepped up to the British Touring Car Championship for 2025 as he completed West Surrey Racing's four-car line-up for the full season. After finishing no higher than 16th on his debut round at Donington Park, Rainford scored his first series podium at the following round at Brands Hatch by finishing second in race one, before taking his first win in race three that same weekend. Four podium-less rounds then ensued, in which Rainford finished no higher than sixth, doing so at in race two Croft. Rainford then took his first ever pole position at Knockhill, before taking the fastest lap in race one and finishing second behind Jake Hill. In the following round at Donington Park, Rainford finished no higher than tenth, before scoring points in all three races at Silverstone with a best result of fifth in race two. Rainford then ended the year with two more points finishes at Brands Hatch, with a best result of fourth in race one, to end his maiden year in BTCC eighth in points.

The following year, Rainford remained with West Surrey Racing for his second year in the British Touring Car Championship. In his second season in the BTCC, Rainford began the season with a podium at Donington Park, before taking wins at Snetterton and Oulton Park to end the year tenth overall.

== Racing record ==
=== Racing career summary ===
Season	Series	Team	Races	Wins	Poles	F/Laps	Podiums	Points	Position
2019	Goodwood Revival – St Marys Trophy		1	0	0	0	1	—N/a	**2nd**
2019	Goodwood Revival – Betty Richmond Trophy		2	0	0	0	0	—N/a	24th
2021	Porsche Carrera Cup Great Britain – Pro-Am	CCK Motorsport	16	5	5	4	8	94	**3rd**
2022	Porsche Carrera Cup Great Britain – Pro-Am	CCK Motorsport	16	12	12	7	14	156	**1st**
2022	Sopwith Cup		1	0	1	1	1	—N/a	**2nd**
2023	Porsche Carrera Cup Great Britain – Pro	CCK Motorsport	16	1	1	0	3	68	4th
2023	Spa Six Hours Classic – GTS12		1	0	0	0	0	—N/a	DNF
2024	Porsche Carrera Cup Great Britain – Pro	Cognition Land & Water with CCK Motorsport	16	2	0	0	8	98	**2nd**
2025	British Touring Car Championship	LKQ Euro Car Parts Racing with WSR	30	1	1	3	3	179	8th
2025	Britcar Endurance Championship – Challenge	Amspeed	1	1	1	1	1	308‡	**1st‡**
2026	British Touring Car Championship	West Surrey Racing	30	2	1	1	4	251	10th

^{‡} Team standings.

=== Complete British Touring Car Championship results ===
(key) Races in bold indicate pole position (1 point awarded – 2002–2003 all races, 2004–present just in first race) Races in italics indicate fastest lap (1 point awarded all races) * signifies that driver lead race for at least one lap (1 point awarded – 2002 just in feature races, 2003–present all races; ^{Superscript} number indicates points-scoring qualifying race position)

Year	Team	Car	1	2	3	4	5	6	7	8	9	10	11	12	13	14	15	16	17	18	19	20	21	22	23	24	25	26	27	28	29	30	DC	Points
2025	LKQ Euro Car Parts Racing with WSR	BMW 330i M Sport LCI	DON; 1; 17	DON; 2 Ret	DON; 3; 16	BRH; 1; 2	BRH; 2; 7	BRH; 3; 1*	SNE; 1; 12	SNE; 2; 9	SNE; 3; 7	THR; 1; 17	THR; 2; 11	THR; 3; 19	OUL; 1; 11	OUL; 2 DSQ	OUL; 3; 9	CRO; 1; 8	CRO; 2; 6	CRO; 3; 13	**KNO**; **1**; 2*	KNO; 2; 6	KNO; 3; 18	DON; 1; 13	DON; 2; 17	DON; 3; 10	SIL; 1; 14	SIL; 2; 5	SIL; 3; 12	BRH; 1; 4	BRH; 2 Ret	BRH; 3; 11	8th	179
2026	West Surrey Racing	BMW 330i M Sport LCI	DON; 1; 3^{5}	DON; 2; 6	DON; 3; 5*	BRH; 1; 9^{15}	BRH; 2 Ret	BRH; 3; 13	**SNE**; **1**; 1*^{1}	**SNE**; **2**; 8*	SNE; 3; 5	OUL; 1; 15^{13}	OUL; 2; 9	OUL; 3; 1*	THR; 1; 17	THR; 2; 13	THR; 3; 14	KNO; 1; 21^{5}	KNO; 2; 6	KNO; 3; 5	DON; 1; 12^{15}	DON; 2; 12	DON; 3; 5	CRO; 1; 7^{11}	CRO; 2; 5	CRO; 3; 15	SIL; 1; 7^{7}	SIL; 2; 3	SIL; 3; 14	BRH; 1 Ret^{12}	BRH; 2; 16	BRH; 3; 11	10th	251
