= 2024 Mini Challenge UK =

Car racing in England and Scotland

The 2024 Vertu Motors Mini Challenge UK was the 23rd running of high-level Mini racing in England and Scotland.

Dan Zelos won his third JCW championship at Knockhill, before graduating to the BTCC mid-season, whilst the new JCW Sport category was won by Dylan Hotchin.

== Teams and drivers ==
Team	No.	Drivers	Rounds
JCW Entries
EXCELR8 Motorsport	1	(United Kingdom) Dan Zelos	1–6
EXCELR8 Motorsport	10	(United Kingdom) Bradley Gravett	1–4
EXCELR8 Motorsport	14	(United Kingdom) Dominic Wheatley	All
EXCELR8 Motorsport	21	(United Kingdom) Nathan Edwards R	All
EXCELR8 Motorsport	24	(United Kingdom) Tom Ovenden R	All
EXCELR8 Motorsport	26	(United Kingdom) Lee Allen	7
EXCELR8 Motorsport	28	(United Kingdom) Josh Price R	3
EXCELR8 Motorsport	64	(United Kingdom) Harry Hickton R	7
EXCELR8 Motorsport	93	(United Kingdom) Maximus Hall R	All
EXCELR8 Motorsport	94	(United Kingdom) Josh Porter	All
EXCELR8 Motorsport	888	(United Kingdom) Matt Hammond D R	1–4
EXCELR8 Motorsport	84	(United Kingdom) Antony Sullivan D R (Note: Sullivan entered Round 7 only as a Rookie.)	7
Jamsport Racing UK	84	(United Kingdom) Antony Sullivan D R	5
Jamsport Racing UK	11	(United Kingdom) Ant Whorton-Eales D	1
Jamsport Racing UK	22	(United Kingdom) James Griffith D	1–4
Jamsport Racing UK	24	(United Kingdom) Joe Tanner D	None (Note: Tanner was added onto the championship prior to season start, but did not appear at any event.)
Jamsport Racing UK	27	(United Kingdom) Marlo Cordell	All
Jamsport Racing UK	32	(United Kingdom) Frankie Taylor R	7
Jamsport Racing UK	46	(United Kingdom) Jamie Going D R	3
Jamsport Racing UK	47	(United Kingdom) Gerry Hendry	6
NAPA Racing UK	18	(United Kingdom) Lewis Selby D	All
NAPA Racing UK	77	(United Kingdom) Jamie Osborne	All
BPC Motorsport	69	(United Kingdom) Brent Bowie	6
Lydia Walmsley Racing	82	(United Kingdom) Lydia Walmsley	All
Laser Tools Racing	95	(United Kingdom) Nelson King	1–6
Bitcoin Racing	210	(United Kingdom) Chris MacKenzie R	1
JCW Sport Entries
JRW Motorsport	2	(United Kingdom) Albert Webster R	1, 3–7
EXCELR8 Motorsport	8	(United Kingdom) Hannah Chapman	1, 6
EXCELR8 Motorsport	71	(United Kingdom) Harvey Riby R	4
NAPA Racing UK	15	(United Kingdom) Cameron Richardson R	All
Jamsport Racing UK	50	(United Kingdom) Dylan Hotchin R	All
Jamsport Racing UK	56	(United Kingdom) Ben Crossley R	All
Bitcoin Racing	210	(United Kingdom) Chris MacKenzie R	2–7
JCW Sport Test Entries
MINI Development	4	(United Kingdom) Stephen Harrison	5
MINI Development	88	(United Kingdom) Roan Lundy	3
MC Development	37	(United Kingdom) Scott Lear	2

== Race calendar ==
Round		Circuit	Date
1	R1	Donington Park National	27–28 April
1	R2	Donington Park National	27–28 April
1	R3	Donington Park National	27–28 April
2	R4	Brands Hatch Indy	11–12 May
2	R5	Brands Hatch Indy	11–12 May
2	R6	Brands Hatch Indy	11–12 May
3	R7	Snetterton Motor Racing Circuit	25–26 May
3	R8	Snetterton Motor Racing Circuit	25–26 May
3	R9	Snetterton Motor Racing Circuit	25–26 May
5	R10	Oulton Park	22–23 June
5	R11	Oulton Park	22–23 June
6	R12	Croft Circuit	27–28 July
6	R13	Croft Circuit	27–28 July
7	R14	Knockhill Racing Circuit	10–11 August
7	R15	Knockhill Racing Circuit	10–11 August
7	R16	Knockhill Racing Circuit	10–11 August
10	R17	Brands Hatch GP	5–6 October
10	R18	Brands Hatch GP	5–6 October
10	R19	Brands Hatch GP	5–6 October

== Results and standings ==
Round		Circuit	Pole position	Fastest lap	Winning Driver	Winning team	JCW Sport winner	Director's Cup Winner	Rookie Cup winner
1	R1	Donington Park National	(United Kingdom) Marlo Cordell	(United Kingdom) Bradley Gravett	(United Kingdom) Dan Zelos	(United Kingdom) EXCELR8 Motorsport	(United Kingdom) Cameron Richardson	(United Kingdom) Lewis Selby	(United Kingdom) Tom Ovenden
1	R2 (Note: Race 2 at Donington Park was red flagged due to incidents and stopped due to time constraints of the weekend. The race was resumed at the Snetterton Circuit meeting.)	Donington Park National		(United Kingdom) Jamie Osborne	(United Kingdom) Dan Zelos	(United Kingdom) EXCELR8 Motorsport	(United Kingdom) Albert Webster	(United Kingdom) James Griffith	(United Kingdom) Nathan Edwards
1	R3	Donington Park National	(United Kingdom) Tom Ovenden	(United Kingdom) Lewis Selby	(United Kingdom) Lewis Selby	(United Kingdom) NAPA Racing UK	(United Kingdom) Dylan Hotchin	(United Kingdom) Lewis Selby	(United Kingdom) Tom Ovenden
2	R1	Brands Hatch Indy	(United Kingdom) Dan Zelos	(United Kingdom) Maximus Hall	(United Kingdom) Maximus Hall	(United Kingdom) EXCELR8 Motorsport	(United Kingdom) Dylan Hotchin	(United Kingdom) Lewis Selby	(United Kingdom) Maximus Hall
2	R2	Brands Hatch Indy		(United Kingdom) Dan Zelos	(United Kingdom) Dan Zelos	(United Kingdom) EXCELR8 Motorsport	(United Kingdom) Dylan Hotchin	(United Kingdom) Lewis Selby	(United Kingdom) Nathan Edwards
2	R3	Brands Hatch Indy	(United Kingdom) Maximus Hall	(United Kingdom) Dan Zelos	(United Kingdom) Maximus Hall	(United Kingdom) EXCELR8 Motorsport	(United Kingdom) Cameron Richardson	(United Kingdom) Lewis Selby	(United Kingdom) Maximus Hall
3	R1	Snetterton Motor Racing Circuit	(United Kingdom) Josh Price	(United Kingdom) Dan Zelos	(United Kingdom) Dan Zelos	(United Kingdom) EXCELR8 Motorsport	(United Kingdom) Albert Webster	(United Kingdom) Lewis Selby	(United Kingdom) Maximus Hall
3	R2	Snetterton Motor Racing Circuit		(United Kingdom) Dominic Wheatley	(United Kingdom) Dan Zelos	(United Kingdom) EXCELR8 Motorsport	(United Kingdom) Albert Webster	(United Kingdom) Jamie Going	(United Kingdom) Maximus Hall
3	R3	Snetterton Motor Racing Circuit	(United Kingdom) Josh Price	(United Kingdom) Dan Zelos	(United Kingdom) Maximus Hall	(United Kingdom) EXCELR8 Motorsport	(United Kingdom) Albert Webster	(United Kingdom) Matt Hammond	(United Kingdom) Maximus Hall
4	R1	Oulton Park	(United Kingdom) Nathan Edwards	(United Kingdom) Dan Zelos	(United Kingdom) Nathan Edwards	(United Kingdom) EXCELR8 Motorsport	(United Kingdom) Albert Webster	(United Kingdom) Lewis Selby	(United Kingdom) Nathan Edwards
4	R2	Oulton Park	(United Kingdom) Nathan Edwards	(United Kingdom) Nathan Edwards	(United Kingdom) Nathan Edwards	(United Kingdom) EXCELR8 Motorsport	(United Kingdom) Dylan Hotchin	(United Kingdom) Matt Hammond	(United Kingdom) Nathan Edwards
5	R1	Croft Circuit	(United Kingdom) Jamie Osborne	(United Kingdom) Jamie Osborne	(United Kingdom) Maximus Hall	(United Kingdom) EXCELR8 Motorsport	(United Kingdom) Dylan Hotchin	(United Kingdom) Lewis Selby	(United Kingdom) Maximus Hall
5	R2	Croft Circuit	(United Kingdom) Jamie Osborne	(United Kingdom) Tom Ovenden	(United Kingdom) Tom Ovenden	(United Kingdom) EXCELR8 Motorsport	(United Kingdom) Albert Webster	(United Kingdom) Lewis Selby	(United Kingdom) Tom Ovenden
6	R1	Knockhill Racing Circuit	(United Kingdom) Dominic Wheatley	(United Kingdom) Jamie Osborne	(United Kingdom) Dominic Wheatley	(United Kingdom) EXCELR8 Motorsport	(United Kingdom) Albert Webster	(United Kingdom) Lewis Selby	(United Kingdom) Maximus Hall
6	R2	Knockhill Racing Circuit		(United Kingdom) Dan Zelos	(United Kingdom) Dan Zelos	(United Kingdom) EXCELR8 Motorsport	(United Kingdom) Albert Webster	(United Kingdom) Lewis Selby	(United Kingdom) Maximus Hall
6	R3	Knockhill Racing Circuit	(United Kingdom) Nathan Edwards	(United Kingdom) Jamie Osborne	(United Kingdom) Nathan Edwards	(United Kingdom) EXCELR8 Motorsport	(United Kingdom) Hannah Chapman	(United Kingdom) Lewis Selby	(United Kingdom) Nathan Edwards
7	R1	Brands Hatch GP	(United Kingdom) Nathan Edwards	(United Kingdom) Nathan Edwards	(United Kingdom) Maximus Hall	(United Kingdom) EXCELR8 Motorsport	(United Kingdom) Dylan Hotchin	(United Kingdom) Lewis Selby	(United Kingdom) Maximus Hall
7	R2	Brands Hatch GP		(United Kingdom) Nathan Edwards	(United Kingdom) Nathan Edwards	(United Kingdom) EXCELR8 Motorsport	(United Kingdom) Cameron Richardson	(United Kingdom) Lewis Selby	(United Kingdom) Nathan Edwards
7	R3	Brands Hatch GP	(United Kingdom) Nathan Edwards	(United Kingdom) Lydia Walmsley	(United Kingdom) Nathan Edwards	(United Kingdom) EXCELR8 Motorsport	(United Kingdom) Albert Webster	(United Kingdom) Lewis Selby	(United Kingdom) Nathan Edwards

=== Championship standings ===
Points system
Races	1st	2nd	3rd	4th	5th	6th	7th	8th	9th	10th	11th	12th	13th	14th	15th	16th	17th	18th	19th	20th	Pole position	Fastest lap
Races	50	44	40	37	34	32	30	28	26	25	24	23	22	21	20	19	18	17	16	15	6	6

==== JCW standings ====
Pos.	Driver	DPN			BHI			SNE			OUL		CRO		KNO			BHGP			Pts
1	(United Kingdom) Dan Zelos	1	1	2	2	1	2	1	1	2	4	5	2	13	4	1	4				731
2	(United Kingdom) Maximus Hall	Ret	6	8	1	Ret	1	5	3	1	5	4	1	6	2	2	Ret	1	2	3	679
3	(United Kingdom) Nathan Edwards	7	4	7	7	4	Ret	9	12	9	1	1	Ret	14	19	9	1	2	1	1	654
4	(United Kingdom) Jamie Osborne	3	2	6	6	Ret	9	4	4	5	9	9	3	2	3	5	3	Ret	3	4	645
5	(United Kingdom) Dominic Wheatley	8	3	4	4	12	10	18	5	3	6	6	5	5	1	7	2	4	6	2	619
6	(United Kingdom) Tom Ovenden	4	7	3	Ret	6	5	11	8	10	2	2	Ret	1	6	4	9	8	15	5	591
7	(United Kingdom) Lewis Selby	6	16	1	5	2	3	8	Ret	Ret	8	8	6	3	5	3	6	10	5	7	584
8	(United Kingdom) Lydia Walmsley	Ret	9	Ret	10	7	7	3	6	8	Ret	15	7	4	9	11	5	5	4	6	598
9	(United Kingdom) Josh Porter	11	15	16	9	5	8	6	10	11	7	Ret	8	Ret	8	6	8	7	7	8	578
10	(United Kingdom) Nelson King	9	11	Ret	8	8	6	2	2	4	3	3	4	Ret	18	12	Ret				432
11	(United Kingdom) Marlo Cordell	Ret	8	Ret	3	3	4	Ret	7	Ret	Ret	Ret	16	Ret	7	8	7	3	Ret	Ret	329
12	(United Kingdom) Bradley Gravett	5	5	14	Ret	Ret	12	7	9	6	11	Ret									237
13	(United Kingdom) Matt Hammond	10	Ret	13	11	Ret	11	12	20	15	12	7									223
14	(United Kingdom) James Griffith	16	14	10	12	Ret	Ret	10	DNS	DNS	10	10									174
Drivers ineligible for Championship points
-	(United Kingdom) Ant Whorton-Eales	2	Ret	5																	-
-	(United Kingdom) Harry Hickton																	6	Ret	9	-
-	(United Kingdom) Josh Price							Ret	11	7											-
-	(United Kingdom) Frankie Taylor																	12	8	10	-
-	(United Kingdom) Gerry Hendry														10	10	17				-
-	(United Kingdom) Brent Bowie														13	16	10				-
-	(United Kingdom) Lee Allen																	13	12	15	-
-	(United Kingdom) Antony Sullivan												15	12				16	14	14	-
-	(United Kingdom) Jamie Going							13	15	DNS											-
-	(United Kingdom) Chris MacKenzie	DNS	DNS	Ret																	-
-	(United Kingdom) Joe Tanner	WD	WD	WD																	-
Pos.	Driver	DPN			BHI			SNE			OUL		CRO		KNO			BHGP			Pts

==== JCW Teams' Championship ====
Pos.	Team	Points
1	EXCELR8 Motorsport – Team Blue (Note: The cars of Dominic Wheatley and Maximus Hall.)	1345
2	EXCELR8 Motorsport – Team Pink (Note: The cars of Nathan Edwards and Tom Ovenden.)	1245
3	NAPA Racing UK	1229
4	EXCELR8 Motorsport – Tem Red (Note: The cars of Dan Zelos and Bradley Gravett.)	968
5	EXCELR8 Motorsport – Team Green (Note: The cars of Josh Porter and Matt Hammond.)	701
6	Jamsport Racing UK	509

==== JCW Rookie Cup ====
Pos.	Team	Points
1	(United Kingdom) Maximus Hall	661
2	(United Kingdom) Nathan Edwards	618
3	(United Kingdom) Tom Ovenden	579
4	(United Kingdom) Matt Hammond	223

==== JCW Directors' Cup ====
Pos.	Team	Points
1	(United Kingdom) Lewis Selby	578
2	(United Kingdom) Matt Hammond	223
3	(United Kingdom) James Griffith	174
4	(United Kingdom) Joe Tanner	0

==== JCW Sport Drivers' Championship ====
Pos.	Driver	DPN			BHI			SNE			OUL		CRO		KNO			BHGP			Pts	Drop	Pts
1	(United Kingdom) Dylan Hotchin	13	13	9	13	9	17	19	16	13	14	11	9	Ret	16	14	12	9	Ret	17	797		797
2	(United Kingdom) Cameron Richardson	12	12	15	Ret	13	13	17	18	16	16	12	10	8	12	17	13	15	9	12	802	37	765
3	(United Kingdom) Ben Crossley	15	17	12	14	14	14	16	17	17	17	13	12	10	17	18	16	11	13	16	756	68	688
4	(United Kingdom) Albert Webster	Ret	10	DNS				14	13	12	13	14	11	7	11	13	14	Ret	11	11	667		667
5	(United Kingdom) Chris MacKenzie				15	10	16	Ret	19	18	18	16	13	11	14	19	15	14	10	13	667		572
Drivers ineligible for points
-	(United Kingdom) Stephen Harrison												14	9							-		-
-	(United Kingdom) Hannah Chapman	14	DNS	11											15	15	11				-		-
-	(United Kingdom) Scott Lear				Ret	11	15														-		-
-	(United Kingdom) Roan Lundy							15	14	14											-		-
-	(United Kingdom) Harvey Riby										15	Ret									-		-
Pos.	Driver	DPN			BHI			SNE			OUL		CRO		KNO			BHGP					Pts

==== JCW Sport Teams' Championship ====
Pos.	Team	Points
1	Jamsport Racing UK	1553

==== JCW Sport Rookie Cup ====
Pos.	Team	Points
1	(United Kingdom) Dylan Hotchin	755
2	(United Kingdom) Cameron Richardson	735
3	(United Kingdom) Ben Crossley	676
4	(United Kingdom) Albert Webster	607
5	(United Kingdom) Chris MacKenzie	566

== Mini Challenge Trophy ==
=== Teams and drivers ===
Team	No.	Drivers	Rounds
Ashley Gregory Racing	2	(United Kingdom) Lewis Saunders R	6–7 (Note: Ashley Gregory did not enter qualifying and Race 1 at Silverstone Circuit, but replaced Lewis Saunders for Races 2 and 3.)
Ashley Gregory Racing	22	(United Kingdom) Ashley Gregory G	All
PerformanceTek Racing	22	(United Kingdom) Ashley Gregory G	1 (Note: Ashley Gregory qualified for PerformanceTek Racing and did not enter with a team in Race 1. She later switched to her own team for Races 2 and 3.)
PerformanceTek Racing	26	(United Kingdom) Callum Eason G	1–4, 6–7
PerformanceTek Racing	33	(United Kingdom) Jamie Keates G	1–3
PerformanceTek Racing	77	(Republic of Ireland) Mick Fitzgerald D	3–4, 6–7
EXCELR8 Motorsport	5	(United Kingdom) Katia Loggie G	All
EXCELR8 Motorsport	7	(United Kingdom) Tommy Watson R D	1, 4–6
EXCELR8 Motorsport	11	(United Kingdom) Gabe Fairbrother G	All
EXCELR8 Motorsport	20	(Italy) Riccardo Monti	4–6
EXCELR8 Motorsport	21	(United Kingdom) Nathan Edwards	3
EXCELR8 Motorsport	27	(United Kingdom) David Tan R D	7
EXCELR8 Motorsport	63	(United Kingdom) John Castle R D	1–4, 7
EXCELR8 Motorsport	71	(United Kingdom) Harvey Riby G	1–6
EXCELR8 Motorsport	78	(United Kingdom) Matt Hammond D	2–3, 7
EXCELR8 Motorsport	86	(United Kingdom) Ben Taylor D G	All
EXCELR8 Motorsport	81	(Italy) Luca Marinoni Osborne	1
Westbourne Motorsport	81	(Italy) Luca Marinoni Osborne	2–7
Westbourne Motorsport	38	(United Kingdom) Olivier Algieri R	5–6
Westbourne Motorsport	64	(United Kingdom) Harry Hickton G	All
Westbourne Motorsport	96	(United Kingdom) Sam Gornall G	All
Mannpower Motorsport	9	(Malta) Warren Scibberas R	6
Mannpower Motorsport	46	(United Kingdom) Paul Manning D	All
Graves Motorsport	12	(United Kingdom) Alex Solley	All
Graves Motorsport	32	(United Kingdom) Frankie Taylor	1–3
Graves Motorsport	53	(United Kingdom) James Black G	All
Graves Motorsport	62	(United Kingdom) Alex Keens G	All
Graves Motorsport	171	(United Kingdom) Leo Purches R	All
NAPA Racing UK	15	(United Kingdom) Cameron Richardson	6
Chandler Motorsport	17	(United Kingdom) Reece Lycett G	1–6
Chandler Motorsport	35	(United Kingdom) Steven Chandler R	1–3, 7
Chandler Motorsport	43	(United Kingdom) Cameron Wood R	All
Chandler Motorsport	51	(United Kingdom) Craig Morgan R	5–7
Chandler Motorsport	59	(United Kingdom) Rhys Hurd G	All
Chandler Motorsport	196	(United Kingdom) Ronnie Smith R	All
Team Avago	95	(United Kingdom) Joshua Wilby R	All
Team Avago	610	(United Kingdom) Louis Fleet	All

=== Race results ===
Round		Circuit	Pole position	Fastest lap	Winning driver	Winning team	Director's Cup Winner	Graduate Cup Winner	Rookie Cup winner
1	R1	Snetterton Motor Racing Circuit	(United Kingdom) Sam Gornall	(United Kingdom) Harry Hickton	(United Kingdom) Sam Gornall	(United Kingdom) Westbourne Motorsport	(United Kingdom) Ben Taylor	(United Kingdom) Sam Gornall	(United Kingdom) Joshua Wilby
1	R2	Snetterton Motor Racing Circuit		(United Kingdom) James Black	(United Kingdom) Harry Hickton	(United Kingdom) Westbourne Motorsport	(United Kingdom) John Castle	(United Kingdom) Harry Hickton	(United Kingdom) Ronnie Smith
1	R3	Snetterton Motor Racing Circuit	(United Kingdom) Sam Gornall	(United Kingdom) James Black	(United Kingdom) Harry Hickton	(United Kingdom) Westbourne Motorsport	(United Kingdom) Paul Manning	(United Kingdom) Harry Hickton	(United Kingdom) Ronnie Smith
2	R4	Pembrey Circuit	(United Kingdom) Alex Keens	(United Kingdom) Harry Hickton	(United Kingdom) Jamie Keates	(United Kingdom) PerformanceTek Racing	(United Kingdom) Matt Hammond	(United Kingdom) Jamie Keates	(United Kingdom) Ronnie Smith
2	R5	Pembrey Circuit		(United Kingdom) Jamie Keates	(United Kingdom) Alex Solley	(United Kingdom) Graves Motorsport	(United Kingdom) Paul Manning	(United Kingdom) James Black	(United Kingdom) Joshua Wilby
2	R6	Pembrey Circuit	(United Kingdom) Alex Keens	(United Kingdom) Alex Solley	(United Kingdom) Harry Hickton	(United Kingdom) Westbourne Motorsport	(United Kingdom) Ben Taylor	(United Kingdom) Harry Hickton	(United Kingdom) Ronnie Smith
3	R7	Thruxton Circuit	(United Kingdom) Alex Solley	(United Kingdom) Harry Hickton	(United Kingdom) Rhys Hurd	(United Kingdom) Chandler Motorsport	(United Kingdom) Paul Manning	(United Kingdom) Rhys Hurd	(United Kingdom) Steven Chandler
3	R8	Thruxton Circuit		(United Kingdom) Sam Gornall	(United Kingdom) Alex Solley	(United Kingdom) Graves Motorsport	(United Kingdom) Matt Hammond	(United Kingdom) Sam Gornall	(United Kingdom) Joshua Wilby
3	R9	Thruxton Circuit	(United Kingdom) Alex Solley	(United Kingdom) Sam Gornall	(United Kingdom) Rhys Hurd	(United Kingdom) Graves Motorsport	(United Kingdom) Matt Hammond	(United Kingdom) Rhys Hurd	(United Kingdom) Ronnie Smith
4	R10	Donington Park GP	(United Kingdom) Alex Solley	(United Kingdom) Alex Solley	(United Kingdom) Rhys Hurd	(United Kingdom) Chandler Motorsport	(United Kingdom) John Castle	(United Kingdom) Rhys Hurd	(United Kingdom) Ronnie Smith
4	R11	Donington Park GP		(United Kingdom) Reece Lycett	(United Kingdom) Harry Hickton	(United Kingdom) Westbourne Motorsport	(United Kingdom) John Castle	(United Kingdom) Harry Hickton	(United Kingdom) Ronnie Smith
4	R12	Donington Park GP	(United Kingdom) Alex Keens	(United Kingdom) Harry Hickton	(United Kingdom) Sam Gornall	(United Kingdom) Westbourne Motorsport	(United Kingdom) Ben Taylor	(United Kingdom) Sam Gornall	(United Kingdom) Ronnie Smith
5	R13	Croft Circuit	(United Kingdom) Sam Gornall	(United Kingdom) Alex Solley	(United Kingdom) Rhys Hurd	(United Kingdom) Chandler Motorsport	(United Kingdom) Tommy Watson	(United Kingdom) Rhys Hurd	(United Kingdom) Ronnie Smith
5	R14	Croft Circuit		(United Kingdom) Alex Solley	(United Kingdom) Gabe Fairbrother	(United Kingdom) EXCELR8 Motorsport	(United Kingdom) Paul Manning	(United Kingdom) Gabe Fairbrother	(United Kingdom) Joshua Wilby
5	R15	Croft Circuit	(United Kingdom) Sam Gornall	(United Kingdom) Ronnie Smith	(United Kingdom) Gabe Fairbrother	(United Kingdom) EXCELR8 Motorsport	(United Kingdom) Paul Manning	(United Kingdom) Gabe Fairbrother	(United Kingdom) Ronnie Smith
6	R16	Silverstone Circuit	(United Kingdom) Sam Gornall	(United Kingdom) Alex Keens	(United Kingdom) Rhys Hurd	(United Kingdom) Chandler Motorsport	(United Kingdom) Ben Taylor	(United Kingdom) Rhys Hurd	(United Kingdom) Olivier Algieri
6	R17	Silverstone Circuit		(United Kingdom) Gabe Fairbrother	(United Kingdom) James Black	(United Kingdom) Graves Motorsport	(United Kingdom) Tommy Watson	(United Kingdom) James Black	(United Kingdom) Olivier Algieri
6	R18	Silverstone Circuit	(United Kingdom) Gabe Fairbrother	(United Kingdom) Alex Solley	(United Kingdom) Sam Gornall	(United Kingdom) Westbourne Motorsport	(United Kingdom) Ben Taylor	(United Kingdom) Sam Gornall	(United Kingdom) Olivier Algieri
7	R19	Brands Hatch Indy	(United Kingdom) Sam Gornall	(United Kingdom) Ronnie Smith	(United Kingdom) James Black	(United Kingdom) Graves Motorsport	(United Kingdom) John Castle	(United Kingdom) James Black	(United Kingdom) Ronnie Smith
7	R20	Brands Hatch Indy		(United Kingdom) Joshua Wilby	(United Kingdom) Harry Hickton	(United Kingdom) Westbourne Motorsport	(United Kingdom) John Castle	(United Kingdom) Harry Hickton	(United Kingdom) Ronnie Smith
7	R21	Brands Hatch Indy	(United Kingdom) Harry Hickton	(United Kingdom) James Black	(United Kingdom) Sam Gornall	(United Kingdom) Westbourne Motorsport	(United Kingdom) Ben Taylor	(United Kingdom) Sam Gornall	(United Kingdom) Ronnie Smith

=== Championship standings ===
Pos.	Driver	SNE			PEM			THR			DPGP			CRO			SIL			BHI			Pts	Drop	Pts
1	(United Kingdom) Harry Hickton	2	1	1	3	4	1	7	13	9	9	1	3	Ret	9	2	6	10	4	4	1	3	804	24	780
2	(United Kingdom) Sam Gornall	1	Ret	5	2	3	2	2	2	8	2	8	1	2	4	Ret	4	4	1	13	8	1	784	6	778
3	(United Kingdom) James Black	3	4	Ret	6	2	4	3	5	3	8	2	5	3	3	4	7	1	6	1	3	4	788	34	754
4	(United Kingdom) Gabe Fairbrother	8	3	8	7	5	9	5	4	6	10	5	2	4	1	1	3	2	7	2	5	2	785	51	734
5	(United Kingdom) Alex Solley	7	6	2	8	1	5	6	1	2	5	15	Ret	6	5	3	5	3	5	7	4	9	749	20	729
6	(United Kingdom) Alex Keens	10	15	4	5	6	Ret	4	3	4	4	11	9	7	2	6	8	5	8	3	7	5	673	26	647
7	(United Kingdom) Ronnie Smith	5	5	6	9	Ret	3	20	14	12	6	6	8	8	Ret	7	15	11	10	6	2	8	565		565
8	(United Kingdom) Rhys Hurd	15	11	Ret	12	DSQ	10	1	7	1	1	Ret	4	1	Ret	16	1	Ret	12	9	6	6	544		544
9	(Italy) Luca Marinoni Osborne	11	8	Ret	17	8	7	8	6	7	7	4	Ret	9	7	5	9	6	3	Ret	20	7	535		535
10	(United Kingdom) Ashley Gregory	12	10	7	15	10	Ret	26	19	14	16	9	12	11	16	15	WD	17	11	5	9	16	441		441
11	(United Kingdom) Leo Purches	17	18	10	18	13	13	19	20	17	Ret	17	10	18	12	8	16	9	9	8	DNS	12	422		422
12	(United Kingdom) Joshua Wilby	13	17	9	16	11	12	16	9	25	11	19	Ret	10	11	14	13	Ret	WD	12	10	10	413		413
13	(United Kingdom) Reece Lycett	9	7	3	4	9	17	9	16	Ret	3	3	7	Ret	Ret	Ret	12	8	Ret				395		395
14	(United Kingdom) Harvey Riby	6	16	11	13	12	14	10	11	11	12	Ret	6	13	8	10	14	Ret	WD				375		375
15	(United Kingdom) Ben Taylor	18	20	16	22	17	15	21	23	23	17	12	11	20	14	12	19	16	14	Ret	16	15	385	15	370
16	(United Kingdom) Louis Fleet	24	21	14	21	18	Ret	Ret	24	21	18	14	16	14	18	13	17	Ret	18	15	17	14	339		339
17	(United Kingdom) Callum Eason	14	13	Ret	Ret	14	8	11	15	16	13	7	Ret				11	Ret	13	11	11	13	331		331
18	(United Kingdom) Cameron Wood	23	19	15	14	19	Ret	17	21	22	20	13	14	Ret	15	Ret	23	14	17	17	Ret	17	318		318
19	(United Kingdom) Paul Manning	19	Ret	13	Ret	16	DNS	12	10	15	15	16	13	15	13	11	22	20	20	Ret	DNS	DNS	315		315
20	(United Kingdom) Katia Loggie	22	Ret	12	20	20	16	23	27	24	23	18	17	16	19	20	Ret	18	Ret	Ret	Ret	Ret	261		261
21	(United Kingdom) Jamie Keates	4	2	Ret	1	7	6	24	25	10													255		255
22	(United Kingdom) John Castle	21	14	17	Ret	21	18	15	18	19	14	10	Ret							14	15	19	251		251
23	(United Kingdom) Steven Chandler	16	12	Ret	11	15	Ret	13	22	18										10	13	22	208		208
24	(United Kingdom) Frankie Taylor	20	9	Ret	19	22	11	25	17	20													149		149
25	(United Kingdom) Tommy Watson	WD	WD	WD							22	Ret	18	19	17	17	21	13	Ret				133		133
Drivers ineligible for championship points
-	(United Kingdom) Olivier Algieri													5	6	9	2	7	2				-		-
-	(United Kingdom) Nathan Edwards							14	8	5													-		-
-	(United Kingdom) Matt Hammond				10	Ret	Ret	18	12	13										16	18	Ret	-		-
-	(United Kingdom) Craig Morgan													12	10	18	10	12	21	Ret	12	21	-		-
-	(Republic of Ireland) Mick Fitzgerald							22	26	Ret	21	Ret	Ret				24	15	16	18	19	18	-		-
-	(Italy) Riccardo Monti										19	20	15	17	Ret	19	25	19	22				-		-
-	(United Kingdom) Cameron Richardson																20	Ret	15				-		-
-	(United Kingdom) Lewis Saunders																18	WD	WD	Ret	14	11	-		-
-	(Malta) Warren Scibberas																26	Ret	19				-		-
-	(United Kingdom) David Tan																			Ret	21	20	-		-
Pos.	Driver	SNE			BHI1			THR			CRO			DPGP			SIL			BHI2			Pts	Drop	Pts

Note - All penalties in the main championship applied in the extra championships.

==== Directors' Cup ====
Pos	Team	Pts
1	(United Kingdom) Ben Taylor	370
2	(United Kingdom) Paul Manning	315
3	(United Kingdom) John Castle	251
4	(United Kingdom) Tommy Watson	133

==== Rookie Cup ====
Pos	Team	Pts
1	(United Kingdom) Ronnie Smith	559
2	(United Kingdom) Leo Purches	422
3	(United Kingdom) Joshua Wilby	407
4	(United Kingdom) Louis Fleet	339
5	(United Kingdom) Cameron Wood	318
6	(United Kingdom) John Castle	251
7	(United Kingdom) Steven Chandler	208
8	(United Kingdom) Tommy Watson	133

==== Graduate Cup ====
Pos	Team	Pts
1	(United Kingdom) Sam Gornall	760
2	(United Kingdom) Harry Hickton	744
3	(United Kingdom) James Black	742
4	(United Kingdom) Gabe Fairbrother	722
5	(United Kingdom) Alex Keens	635
6	(United Kingdom) Rhys Hurd	544
7	(United Kingdom) Ashley Gregory	441
8	(United Kingdom) Reece Lycett	389
9	(United Kingdom) Harvey Riby	375
10	(United Kingdom) Ben Taylor	370
11	(United Kingdom) Callum Eason	331
12	(United Kingdom) Katia Loggie	261
13	(United Kingdom) Jamie Keates	249
