= Tom Ovenden =

British racing driver (born 2004)

- Ovenden driving a Mini at Silverstone Circuit in 2026
- Nationality: (United Kingdom) British
- Born: Thomas Ovenden; 26 April 2004 (age 22) Adisham, Kent, England
- Relatives: Tristan Ovenden (father)

Mini Challenge UK – JCW career
- Debut season: 2024
- Current team: EXCELR8 Driver Development Programme
- Car number: 1
- Starts: 58
- Wins: 8
- Podiums: 21
- Poles: 6
- Fastest laps: 7
- Best finish: 1st in 2025, 2026

Previous series
- 2021–2023: Mini Challenge Trophy

Championship titles
- 2025, 2026 2023: Mini Challenge UK – JCW; Mini Challenge Trophy
- Statistics up to date as of November 2026.

Thomas Ovenden (born 26 April 2004) is a British racing driver who is set to compete in the British Touring Car Championship for Team VERTU.

Ovenden was awarded the 'Most Improved Driver' award for his 2021 Mini Challenge Trophy campaign. Since moving to car racing in 2021, Ovenden has competed with EXCELR8 Motorsport in every season up to 2027.

== Personal life ==
Ovenden is son of Rallycross champion Tristan Ovenden, and brother of Will Ovenden.

Ovenden's second cousin, Ollie, took his own life in February 2026. Brother of Ollie, Matthew, died in 2021 after a freak accident.

Ovenden's father, Tristan, owns Ovenden All Works.

== Racing career ==
=== Mini Challenge Trophy (2021–2023) ===
For 2021, Ovenden exchanged dirt for tarmac, joining the Mini Challenge Trophy. He would score a best result of P8 prior to the final 2 weekends, where he would score 4 podiums and 1 maiden win. He stood on the podium in every race at the season finale at Silverstone.

Ovenden remained in the Mini Challenge Trophy for 2022, still competing with EXCELR8 Motorsport. Despite no poles, Ovenden scored 2 wins, being Races 1 at Thruxton and Snetterton. A pair of second-place finishes at Croft, along with Thruxton and Donington Park. He would lose out to Graves Motorsport's Nelson King.

Despite a high finish in 2022, Ovenden remained in the series for 2023. Scoring 4 podiums in the opening 4 races, Ovenden took an early lead in the championship, a further 7 podiums, including 3 wins at Brands Hatch, Croft and Donington Park respectively. The year saw Ovenden take the championship, with a 7-point gap separating he and Nicky Taylor, but won the championship by a 34-point margin after drop scores were applied.

=== Mini Challenge UK (2024–2026) ===
In 2024, Ovenden stepped up the JCW class of the Mini Challenge UK, competing with EXCELR8 Motorsport once again. He scored 1 podium in the opening round of the season at Donington Park, being a P3 finish. His next podiums came at Oulton Park, claiming 2 second-place finishes. His last podium came 2 races later, being the second race at Croft, where Ovenden won his first JCW race. He placed 6th in the standings.

Moving to EXCELR8 Motorsport's driver development programme for 2025, Ovenden would stay in the Mini Challenge UK JCW class for 2025. Throughout the first 3 meetings, Ovenden scored 3 pole positions, 1 win and 5 podiums. 5 more podiums followed in the second half, with 1 win included, coming at Croft. Ovenden would take glory to win his first JCW championship, aided by the mid-season withdrawal of Jamie Osborne.

In 2026, reigning champion Ovenden stayed with the EXCELR8 Driver Development Programme fold. Ovenden won all 3 races at the Donington Park opener. He ended up as back-to-back champion at season's end, beating Max Edmundson by just 1 point.

=== British Touring Car Championship ===
In 2026, Ovenden stepped into a reserve and development driver role for EXCELR8 Motorsport's Team VERTU.

After tests in 2026, Ovenden stepped up to the British Touring Car Championship with Team VERTU.

== Racing record ==
=== Career summary ===
Season	Series	Team	Races	Wins	Poles	F/Laps	Podiums	Points	Position
2021	Mini Challenge Trophy	EXCELR8 Motorsport	17	1	0	3	4	460	6th
2022	Mini Challenge Trophy	EXCELR8 Motorsport	19	2	0	2	6	624	3rd
2023	Mini Challenge Trophy	EXCELR8 Motorsport	20	3	2	2	11	723	1st
2024	Mini Challenge UK – JCW	EXCELR8 Motorsport	19	1	0	2	4	691	6th
2025	Mini Challenge UK – JCW	EXCELR8 Driver Development Programme	19	2	3	0	10	750	1st
2026	Mini Challenge UK – JCW	EXCELR8 Driver Development Programme	20	5	3	5	7	788	1st
2026	British Touring Car Championship	Team VERTU	Reserve and development driver						
2027	British Touring Car Championship	Team VERTU							

==== Complete MINI Challenge Trophy results ====
Year	Team	1	2	3	4	5	6	7	8	9	10	11	12	13	14	15	16	17	18	19	20	DC	Points
2021	EXCELR8 Motorsport	SNE; 1; 16	SNE; 2; 8	THR; 1; 28	THR; 2; 18	THR; 3; 13	BRH; 1; 15	BRH; 2; 8	OUL; 1; 24	OUL; 2; 18	CRO; 1; 8	CRO; 2; 11	THR; 1; 7	THR; 2; 2	THR; 3; 7	SIL; 1; 3	SIL; 2; 3	SIL; 3; 1				6th	460
2022	EXCELR8 Motorsport	PEM; 1; 6	PEM; 2; 5	PEM; 3; 8	THR; 1; 13	THR; 2; 16	THR; 3; 7	CRO; 1; 2	CRO; 2; 2	THR; 1; 1	THR; 2; 2	SNE; 1; 1	SNE; 2; 29	SNE; 3; 15	DON; 1; 4	DON; 2; 4	DON; 3; 2	BRH; 1; 5	BRH; 2; 4	BRH; 3; 7		3rd	624
2023	EXCELR8 Motorsport	BRH; 1; 1	BRH; 2; 2	BRH; 3; 2	SNE; 1; 3	SNE; 2; 17	SNE; 3; 11	THR; 1; 3	THR; 2; 3	THR; 3; 11	CRO; 1; 1	CRO; 2; 2	DON; 1; 2	DON; 2; 3	DON; 3; 1	SIL; 1 Ret	SIL; 2; 9	SIL; 3; 7	BRH; 1; 7	BRH; 2; 5	BRH; 3; 6	1st	723

==== Complete MINI Challenge UK JCW results ====
Year	Team	1	2	3	4	5	6	7	8	9	10	11	12	13	14	15	16	17	18	19	20	DC	Points
2024	EXCELR8 Motorsport	DON; 1; 4	DON; 2; 7	DON; 3; 3	BRH; 1 Ret	BRH; 2; 6	BRH; 3; 5	SNE; 1; 11	SNE; 2; 8	SNE; 3; 10	OUL; 1; 2	OUL; 2; 2	CRO; 1 Ret	CRO; 2; 1	KNO; 1; 6	KNO; 2; 4	KNO; 3; 9	BRH; 1; 8	BRH; 2; 15	BRH; 3; 5		6th	591
2025	EXCELR8 Driver Development Programme	DON; 1; 5	DON; 2; 3	DON; 3; 2	SNE; 1; 1	SNE; 2; 15	SNE; 2; 2	OUL; 1; 2	OUL; 2; 4	CRO; 1; 1	CRO; 2; 3	KNO; 1; 6	KNO; 2; 3	KNO; 3; 4	SIL; 1; 6	SIL; 2; 2	SIL; 3; 5	BRH; 1; 3	BRH; 2; 8	BRH; 3; 4		1st	750
2026	EXCELR8 Driver Development Programme	DON; 1; 1	DON; 2; 1	DON; 3; 1	BRH; 1; 6	BRH; 2; 1	BRH; 3; 9	SNE; 1; 4	SNE; 2; 6	SNE; 3; 2	OUL; 1; 3	OUL; 2; 4	KNO; 1; 4	KNO; 2; 5	KNO; 3; 6	SIL; 1; 8	SIL; 2; 5	SIL; 3; 5	BRH; 1; 5	BRH; 2; 1	BRH; 3; 7	1st	788
