= 2027 British Touring Car Championship =

70th season of the British Touring Car Championship

The 2027 Kwik Fit British Touring Car Championship (commonly abbreviated as BTCC) will be a motor racing championship for production-based touring cars held across England and Scotland. The championship will feature a mix of professional motor racing teams and privately funded amateur drivers competing in highly modified versions of family cars which are sold to the general public and conform to the technical regulations for the championship. It will be the 70th British Touring Car Championship season.

== Rule changes ==
2027 was the first year in the updated NGTC ruleset. From 2027, "as long as the vehicle brand is sold within the UK" and "the car is originally equipped with an internal combustion engine as its primary means of motive power" it can be used. Further to this the requirement the vehicle and the engine must be of the same manufacture (unless using the TOCA engine) has been removed.

== Teams and drivers ==
Team	Car	Engine	No.	Drivers	Rounds
Constructor Entries
Team VERTU	Hyundai i30 Fastback N Performance	TBC	24	(United Kingdom) Tom Ovenden	TBC
Team VERTU	Hyundai i30 Fastback N Performance	TBC	80	(United Kingdom) Tom Ingram	TBC
Team VERTU	Hyundai i30 Fastback N Performance	TBC	95	(United Kingdom) Noah Young	TBC
Team VERTU	Hyundai i30 Fastback N Performance	TBC	TBA	TBC	TBC
Alliance Racing	Ford Focus Titanium Saloon	Ford/Mountune	27	(United Kingdom) Dan Cammish	TBC
Alliance Racing	Ford Focus Titanium Saloon	Ford/Mountune	116	(United Kingdom) Ashley Sutton	TBC
Alliance Racing	Ford Focus Titanium Saloon	Ford/Mountune	TBA	TBC	TBC
Alliance Racing	Ford Focus Titanium Saloon	Ford/Mountune	TBA	TBC	TBC
CPRL	Mercedes-AMG A35 Saloon	TOCA/M-Sport	TBA	TBC	TBC
CPRL	Mercedes-AMG A35 Saloon	TOCA/M-Sport	TBA	TBC	TBC
Speedworks Motorsport	Toyota Corolla GR Sport	TOCA/M-Sport	TBA	TBC	TBC
Speedworks Motorsport	Toyota Corolla GR Sport	TOCA/M-Sport	TBA	TBC	TBC
Independent Entries
WSR	BMW 330i M Sport LCI	BMW/Neil Brown	TBA	TBC	TBC
WSR	BMW 330i M Sport LCI	BMW/Neil Brown	TBA	TBC	TBC
WSR	BMW 330i M Sport LCI	BMW/Neil Brown	TBA	TBC	TBC
LKQ Euro Car Parts with Power Maxed Racing	Audi S3 Saloon	TOCA/M-Sport	TBA	TBC	TBC
LKQ Euro Car Parts with Power Maxed Racing	Audi S3 Saloon	TOCA/M-Sport	TBA	TBC	TBC
Steel Seal with Power Maxed Racing	Audi S3 Saloon	TOCA/M-Sport	TBA	TBC	TBC
Steel Seal with Power Maxed Racing	Audi S3 Saloon	TOCA/M-Sport	TBA	TBC	TBC
Restart Racing	Hyundai i30 Fastback N Performance	TBC	TBA	TBC	TBC
Restart Racing	Hyundai i30 Fastback N Performance	TBC	TBA	TBC	TBC
Laser Tools Racing with MB Motorsport	Toyota Corolla GR Sport	TOCA/M-Sport	TBA	TBC	TBC
Laser Tools Racing with MB Motorsport	Toyota Corolla GR Sport	TOCA/M-Sport	TBA	TBC	TBC

Key
Eligible for the Jack Sears Trophy (Note: Drivers are eligible for the Jack Sears Trophy if they have not scored more than one outright podium and the podium has not been awarded as a result of penalties, or not previously won the Trophy.)

Entering/re-entering BTCC

Ginetta Junior Championship driver Noah Young joined Team VERTU to replace Ricky Collard, becoming the youngest driver to debut in BTCC history and first at 16 years old since Aiden Moffat in 2013.

2025 and 2026 Mini Challenge UK champion Tom Ovenden graduated with Team VERTU, replacing Tom Chilton alongside Tom Ingram.

Changed teams

Leaving BTCC

After competing in 20 seasons spanning 25 years, Tom Chilton retired from professional racing, leaving Team VERTU.

NAPA Racing UK driver Sam Osborne announced his retirement from the BTCC after just 8 years.

Team changes

Swindon Powertrains withdrew from supplying engines to EXCELR8 Motorsport and Restart Racing at the end of the 2026 season, ending a 17-year long streak of supplying BTCC engines..

== Race calendar ==
2027 BTCC Race Locations

The 2027 calendar was announced on the 18 April 2026, with a mostly identical calendar order, with only Croft and Donington Park GP circuits swapping places.

Round		Circuit	Date
1	R1	Donington Park (National Circuit, Leicestershire)	10–11 April
1	R2	Donington Park (National Circuit, Leicestershire)	10–11 April
1	R3	Donington Park (National Circuit, Leicestershire)	10–11 April
2	R4	Brands Hatch (Indy Circuit, Kent)	8–9 May
2	R5	Brands Hatch (Indy Circuit, Kent)	8–9 May
2	R6	Brands Hatch (Indy Circuit, Kent)	8–9 May
3	R7	Snetterton Motor Racing Circuit (300 Circuit, Norfolk)	29–30 May
3	R8	Snetterton Motor Racing Circuit (300 Circuit, Norfolk)	29–30 May
3	R9	Snetterton Motor Racing Circuit (300 Circuit, Norfolk)	29–30 May
4	R10	Oulton Park (Island Circuit, Cheshire)	12–13 June
4	R11	Oulton Park (Island Circuit, Cheshire)	12–13 June
4	R12	Oulton Park (Island Circuit, Cheshire)	12–13 June
5	R13	Thruxton Circuit (Hampshire)	24–25 July
5	R14	Thruxton Circuit (Hampshire)	24–25 July
5	R15	Thruxton Circuit (Hampshire)	24–25 July
6	R16	Knockhill Racing Circuit (Fife)	7–8 August
6	R17	Knockhill Racing Circuit (Fife)	7–8 August
6	R18	Knockhill Racing Circuit (Fife)	7–8 August
7	R19	Croft Circuit (North Yorkshire)	14–15 August
7	R20	Croft Circuit (North Yorkshire)	14–15 August
7	R21	Croft Circuit (North Yorkshire)	14–15 August
8	R22	Donington Park (Grand Prix Circuit, Leicestershire)	11–12 September
8	R23	Donington Park (Grand Prix Circuit, Leicestershire)	11–12 September
8	R24	Donington Park (Grand Prix Circuit, Leicestershire)	11–12 September
9	R25	Silverstone Circuit (National Circuit, Northamptonshire)	25–26 September
9	R26	Silverstone Circuit (National Circuit, Northamptonshire)	25–26 September
9	R27	Silverstone Circuit (National Circuit, Northamptonshire)	25–26 September
10	R28	Brands Hatch (Grand Prix Circuit, Kent)	9–10 October
10	R29	Brands Hatch (Grand Prix Circuit, Kent)	9–10 October
10	R30	Brands Hatch (Grand Prix Circuit, Kent)	9–10 October
