= Cemil Çıpa =

Turkish racing driver and property developer (born 1988)

Cemil Çipa
- Çıpa driving an EXCELR8 Motorsport Mini Hatch car at Silverstone Circuit in 2026
- Nationality: (Turkey) Turkish
- Born: Ahmet-Cemil Çıpa; 22 January 1988 (age 38) Istanbul, Turkey

Mini Challenge UK – JCW career
- Debut season: 2026
- Current team: EXCELR8 Motorsport
- Years active: 2026
- Car number: 26
- Starts: 20
- Wins: 0
- Podiums: 0
- Poles: 0
- Fastest laps: 0
- Best finish: 15th in 2026

Previous series
- 2006 2005–2006 2005 2004–2005 2004 2004: Formula 3 Euro Series; Formula 3 Turkey; Le Mans Endurance Series; Pist Championship Turkey Group Super 1600; Pist Championship Turkey Group Maxi; Renault Clio Cup Turkey

Ahmet-Cemil Çıpa (born 22 January 1988) is a Turkish racing driver and property developer who currently competes in the Mini Challenge UK for EXCELR8 Motorsport.

Çıpa returned to racing in 2026 after a 20-year absence, competing in the Mini Challenge UK.

== Personal life ==
Çıpa also owns a property-developing company, CESA Properties. Both he and the company are based in London, England.

After his initial retirement in 2006, Çıpa went on to study at the Scottish Heriot-Watt University.

== Career ==
After securing 4 titles in Karting, Çıpa joined the Renault Clio Cup Turkey for 2004. He went on to place P3 in the standings. Çıpa also entered the Pist Championship Turkey, competing with Opel. Across both the Super 1600 and the Maxi championships, he would place 4th and 7th.

2005 saw Çıpa continue in the Pist Championship Turkey Group Super 1600, this time with Beste Motorsport. Çıpa made his sportscar debut in the same year, competing with Paul Belmondo Racing in the 2005 100km of Istanbul, at his home track, Istanbul Park. Çıpa also ventured into single-seater racing, competing in the Formula 3 Turkey, placing 1st.

Staying in the Formula 3 Turkey Championship for 2006, Çıpa would place 3rd this time. Alongside the Formula 3 Turkey campaign, he also branched out to the Formula 3 Euro Series, where he placed 3rd with 2 class wins. Çıpa retired from racing after this season.

After a 20-year sabbatical to focus on his career, Çıpa returned to racing in the Mini Challenge UK, competing with reigning champions EXCELR8 Motorsport. He placed 15th, with no podium finishes to his name.

== Racing results ==
=== Career summary ===
Season	Series	Team	Races	Wins	Poles	F/Laps	Podiums	Points	Position
2004	Renault Clio Cup Turkey	Performans Organizasyon	?	?	?	?	?	?	3rd
2004	Pist Championship Turkey Group Super 1600	Opel Team Türkiye	?	?	?	?	?	?	4th
2004	Pist Championship Turkey Group Maxi	Opel Team Türkiye	?	?	?	?	?	?	7th
2005	Pist Championship Turkey Group Super 1600	Beste Motorsport	?	?	?	?	?	?	1st
2005	Le Mans Endurance Series - LMP2	Paul Belmondo Racing	1	0	0	0	0	0	42nd
2005	Formula 3 Turkey	Privateer	?	?	?	?	?	?	1st
2006	Formula 3 Turkey	Privateer	?	?	?	?	?	?	3rd
2006	Formula 3 Euro Series - Trophy	HBR Motorsport	13	2	2	4	9	65	3rd
2026	Mini Challenge UK	EXCELR8 Motorsport	20	0	0	0	0	403	15th
