= 2023 Mini Challenge UK =

Season of a one-make race series

The 2023 Vertu Motors Mini Challenge UK was the 22nd season of Mini Challenge UK, ran in England and Scotland.

Dan Zelos won his second JCW championship, with 10 wins. EXCELR8 Motorsport – Red won the Teams' Championship.

== Teams and drivers ==
Team	No.	Drivers	Rounds
JCW Entries
Hybrid Tune	1	(United Kingdom) Sam Weller	3, 7
Hybrid Tune	13	(United Kingdom) Ryan Faulconbridge	1–2, 4–6
Hybrid Tune	24	(United Kingdom) Joe Tanner D	All
Hybrid Tune	31	(United Kingdom) Will Orton R	All
Hybrid Tune	42	(United Kingdom) Sam Smith G	1, 6–7
EXCELR8 Motorsport	2	(United Kingdom) Nathan Harrison	7
EXCELR8 Motorsport	8	(United Kingdom) Steven Lake D R	1–4
EXCELR8 Motorsport	10	(United Kingdom) Bradley Gravett	1–5, 7
EXCELR8 Motorsport	22	(United Kingdom) Barry Ward D G	1–4
EXCELR8 Motorsport	26	(United Kingdom) Thomas Jack Lee R	All
EXCELR8 Motorsport	45	(United Kingdom) Dan Zelos	All
EXCELR8 Motorsport	88	(United Kingdom) Oliver Meadows R	All
EXCELR8 Motorsport	93	(United Kingdom) Maximus Hall R	7
EXCELR8 Motorsport	94	(United Kingdom) Josh Porter R	All
EXCELR8 Motorsport	96	(United Kingdom) Jordan Kerridge R	1–6
Graves Motorsport	5	(United Kingdom) James Griffith D	1–4, 6
Graves Motorsport	12	(United Kingdom) Spencer Stevenson R	6–7
Graves Motorsport	14	(United Kingdom) Dominic Wheatley G	All
Graves Motorsport	95	(United Kingdom) Nelson King R	All
Autotech Motorsport	9	(United Kingdom) Bill Hardy D	All
NAPA Racing UK	18	(United Kingdom) Lewis Selby D R	All
NAPA Racing UK	77	(United Kingdom) Jamie Osborne G	All
Jamsport Racing	27	(United Kingdom) Marlo Cordell R	1–5, 7
OX4 Racingg	35	(United Kingdom) Simon Reed D R	1–3, 5–7
Lydia Walmsley Racing	82	(United Kingdom) Lydia Walmsley	All
TEAM PETTERS RACING	86	(United Kingdom) Daniel Petters	1–5
TEAM PETTERS RACING	322	(United Kingdom) Jamie Petters	1–5

Ronan Pearson was set to compete with EXCELR8 Motorsport, but withdrew to compete with the team in the British Touring Car Championship.

Jamie Tonks was set to debut with EXCELR8 Motorsport in the second half of the season, but did not appear.

== Race calendar ==
Round		Circuit	Date
1	R1	Donington Park National	22–23 April
1	R2	Donington Park National	22–23 April
1	R3	Donington Park National	22–23 April
2	R4	Brands Hatch Indy	6–7 May
2	R5	Brands Hatch Indy	6–7 May
2	R6	Brands Hatch Indy	6–7 May
3	R7	Snetterton Circuit	20–21 May
3	R8	Snetterton Circuit	20–21 May
3	R9	Snetterton Circuit	20–21 May
5	R10	Oulton Park	17–18 June
5	R11	Oulton Park	17–18 June
7	R12	Knockhill Racing Circuit	12–13 August
7	R13	Knockhill Racing Circuit	12–13 August
7	R14	Knockhill Racing Circuit	12–13 August
9	R15	Silverstone Circuit	23–24 September
9	R16	Silverstone Circuit	23–24 September
9	R17	Silverstone Circuit	23–24 September
10	R18	Brands Hatch GP	7–8 October
10	R19	Brands Hatch GP	7–8 October
10	R20	Brands Hatch GP	7–8 October

== Results and standings ==
=== Race Results ===
Round		Circuit	Pole position	Fastest lap	Winning Driver	Winning team	Director's Cup Winner	Rookie Cup winner	Graduate Cup Winner
1	R1	Donington Park National	(United Kingdom) Dan Zelos	(United Kingdom) Dan Zelos	(United Kingdom) Dan Zelos	(United Kingdom) EXCELR8 Motorsport	(United Kingdom) Joe Tanner	(United Kingdom) Will Orton	(United Kingdom) Sam Smith
1	R2	Donington Park National		(United Kingdom) Oliver Meadows	(United Kingdom) Dan Zelos	(United Kingdom) EXCELR8 Motorsport	(United Kingdom) Joe Tanner	(United Kingdom) Will Orton	(United Kingdom) Sam Smith
1	R3	Donington Park National		(United Kingdom) Will Orton	(United Kingdom) Will Orton	(United Kingdom) Hybrid Tune	(United Kingdom) Joe Tanner	(United Kingdom) Will Orton	(United Kingdom) Dominic Wheatley
2	R1	Brands Hatch Indy	(United Kingdom) Dan Zelos	(United Kingdom) Dan Zelos	(United Kingdom) Dan Zelos	(United Kingdom) EXCELR8 Motorsport	(United Kingdom) Barry Ward	(United Kingdom) Will Orton	(United Kingdom) Jamie Osborne
2	R2	Brands Hatch Indy		(United Kingdom) Will Orton	(United Kingdom) Will Orton	(United Kingdom) Hybrid Tune	(United Kingdom) Lewis Selby	(United Kingdom) Will Orton	(United Kingdom) Dominic Wheatley
2	R3	Brands Hatch Indy		(United Kingdom) Will Orton	(United Kingdom) Will Orton	(United Kingdom) Hybrid Tune	(United Kingdom) Joe Tanner	(United Kingdom) Will Orton	(United Kingdom) Dominic Wheatley
3	R1	Snetterton Motor Racing Circuit	(United Kingdom) Dan Zelos	(United Kingdom) Joe Tanner	(United Kingdom) Dan Zelos	(United Kingdom) EXCELR8 Motorsport	(United Kingdom) Joe Tanner	(United Kingdom) Will Orton	(United Kingdom) Dominic Wheatley
3	R2	Snetterton Motor Racing Circuit		(United Kingdom) Sam Weller	(United Kingdom) Dan Zelos	(United Kingdom) EXCELR8 Motorsport	(United Kingdom) Joe Tanner	(United Kingdom) Nelson King	(United Kingdom) Dominic Wheatley
3	R3	Snetterton Motor Racing Circuit		(United Kingdom) Will Orton	(United Kingdom) Nelson King	(United Kingdom) Graves Motorsport	(United Kingdom) Joe Tanner	(United Kingdom) Nelson King	(United Kingdom) Dominic Wheatley
4	R1	Oulton Park	(United Kingdom) Dan Zelos	(United Kingdom) Dan Zelos	(United Kingdom) Dan Zelos	(United Kingdom) EXCELR8 Motorsport	(United Kingdom) Joe Tanner	(United Kingdom) Will Orton	(United Kingdom) Jamie Osborne
4	R2	Oulton Park		(United Kingdom) Thomas Jack Lee	(United Kingdom) Jamie Osborne	(United Kingdom) NAPA Racing UK	(United Kingdom) Joe Tanner	(United Kingdom) Nelson King	(United Kingdom) Jamie Osborne
5	R1	Knockhill Racing Circuit	(United Kingdom) Dan Zelos	(United Kingdom) Dan Zelos	(United Kingdom) Will Orton	(United Kingdom) Hybrid Tune	(United Kingdom) Joe Tanner	(United Kingdom) Will Orton	(United Kingdom) Jamie Osborne
5	R2	Knockhill Racing Circuit		(United Kingdom) Will Orton	(United Kingdom) Dan Zelos	(United Kingdom) EXCELR8 Motorsport	(United Kingdom) Lewis Selby	(United Kingdom) Nelson King	(United Kingdom) Jamie Osborne
5	R3	Knockhill Racing Circuit		(United Kingdom) Dan Zelos	(United Kingdom) Dan Zelos	(United Kingdom) EXCELR8 Motorsport	(United Kingdom) Joe Tanner	(United Kingdom) Will Orton	(United Kingdom) Jamie Osborne
6	R1	Silverstone Circuit	(United Kingdom) Dan Zelos	(United Kingdom) Oliver Meadows	(United Kingdom) Will Orton	(United Kingdom) Hybrid Tune	(United Kingdom) James Griffith	(United Kingdom) Will Orton	(United Kingdom) Dominic Wheatley
6	R2	Silverstone Circuit		(United Kingdom) Bradley Gravett	(United Kingdom) Dan Zelos	(United Kingdom) EXCELR8 Motorsport	(United Kingdom) Joe Tanner	(United Kingdom) Nelson King	(United Kingdom) Dominic Wheatley
6	R3	Silverstone Circuit		(United Kingdom) Nelson King	(United Kingdom) Dan Zelos	(United Kingdom) EXCELR8 Motorsport	(United Kingdom) Joe Tanner	(United Kingdom) Thomas Jack Lee	(United Kingdom) Jamie Osborne
7	R1	Brands Hatch GP	(United Kingdom) Sam Smith	(United Kingdom) Will Orton	(United Kingdom) Sam Smith	(United Kingdom) Hybrid Tune	(United Kingdom) Joe Tanner	(United Kingdom) Will Orton	(United Kingdom) Sam Smith
7	R2	Brands Hatch GP		(United Kingdom) Will Orton	(United Kingdom) Sam Smith	(United Kingdom) Hybrid Tune	(United Kingdom) Simon Reed	(United Kingdom) Will Orton	(United Kingdom) Sam Smith
7	R3	Brands Hatch GP		(United Kingdom) Nathan Harrison	(United Kingdom) Sam Weller	(United Kingdom) Hybrid Tune	(United Kingdom) Lewis Selby	(United Kingdom) Will Orton	(United Kingdom) Dominic Wheatley

=== Championship standings ===
Points system
Races	1st	2nd	3rd	4th	5th	6th	7th	8th	9th	10th	11th	12th	13th	14th	15th	16th	17th	18th	19th	20th	Fastest lap	Pole position
Races	50	44	40	37	34	32	30	28	26	25	24	23	22	21	20	19	18	17	16	15	6	6

==== Drivers' championship ====
Pos.	Driver	DPN			BHI			SNE			OUL		KNO			SIL			BHGP			Pts	Pen.	Drop	Pts
1	(United Kingdom) Dan Zelos	1	1	Ret	1	19	4	1	1	4	1	6	4	1	1	2	1	1	2	16	6	878		16	862
2	(United Kingdom) Will Orton	4	4	1	2	1	1	3	Ret	Ret	4	3	1	3	3	1	6	4	3	2	2	816		6	810
3	(United Kingdom) Nelson King	8	6	3	Ret	12	5	7	4	1	5	2	2	2	Ret	3	2	10	10	6	14	650			650
4	(United Kingdom) Oliver Meadows	5	5	7	3	7	3	6	6	5	7	16	Ret	7	9	4	3	3	7	5	3	662		19	643
5	(United Kingdom) Joe Tanner	3	2	2	Ret	9	6	2	2	2	2	4	3	Ret	4	12	8	7	8	Ret	DNS	598			598
6	(United Kingdom) Bradley Gravett	Ret	13	10	4	2	Ret	5	5	7	3	5	5	4	7	Ret	17	8	6	9	5	573			573
7	(United Kingdom) Thomas Jack Lee	7	20	13	14	8	2	10	7	8	Ret	8	9	5	5	5	4	2	12	12	9	572		15	557
8	(United Kingdom) Jamie Osborne	Ret	12	5	5	4	13	15	Ret	9	6	1	6	6	2	DNS	12	5	9	10	16	529			529
9	(United Kingdom) Dominic Wheatley	11	10	4	8	3	10	8	9	3	12	11	7	Ret	10	8	9	16	11	Ret	8	511			511
10	(United Kingdom) Lydia Walmsley	10	9	8	9	10	20	12	10	10	8	7	Ret	12	8	10	5	9	13	7	7	509		15	494
11	(United Kingdom) Lewis Selby	19	14	6	11	6	7	9	12	11	10	Ret	11	8	11	16	15	13	16	13	11	472		16	456
12	(United Kingdom) Josh Porter	9	8	9	10	17	12	13	15	12	9	10	13	10	15	7	7	12	Ret	Ret	15	439			439
13	(United Kingdom) Bill Hardy	18	Ret	17	16	13	15	17	14	15	16	12	17	11	Ret	13	13	Ret	15	14	13	360			360
14	(United Kingdom) Simon Reed	17	21	15	20	20	18	20	18	17			14	15	14	15	16	15	17	11	12	352			352
15	(United Kingdom) Jordan Kerridge	16	18	14	14	16	21	21	17	18	17	14	16	16	Ret	14	11	14				309			309
16	(United Kingdom) Marlo Cordell	12	11	11	6	5	19	16	Ret	14	13	Ret	12	Ret	Ret				19	15	Ret	283			283
17	(United Kingdom) Ryan Faulconbridge	13	15	Ret	17	14	17				11	15	10	9	6	DNS	14	11				273			273
18	(United Kingdom) Daniel Petters	14	16	Ret	18	15	14	19	13	13	DNS	Ret	15	13	13							225			225
19	(United Kingdom) Jamie Petters	15	17	16	19	18	16	Ret	16	16	Ret	Ret	8	14	12							221			221
20	(United Kingdom) Sam Smith	2	3	Ret												9	DNS	DNS	1	1	Ret	216			216
21	(United Kingdom) Barry Ward	6	7	Ret	17	Ret	11	14	11	Ret	14	9										210			210
22	(United Kingdom) James Griffith	Ret	Ret	Ret	13	11	9	11	8	Ret	18	13				6	Ret	Ret				198			198
23	(United Kingdom) Steven Lake	20	19	12	12	Ret	8	18	DSQ	DNS	15	DNS										143	60		83
Drivers ineligible for championship points
-	(United Kingdom) Sam Weller							4	3	6									4	3	1	-			-
-	(United Kingdom) Nathan Harrison																		5	4	4	-			-
-	(United Kingdom) Spencer Stevenson															11	9	6	18	8	Ret	-			-
-	(United Kingdom) Maximus Hall																		14	Ret	10	-			-
Pos.	Driver	DPN			BHI			SNE			OUL		KNO			SIL			BHGP			Pts	Pen.	Drop	Pts

==== Teams' Championship ====
Pos.	Team	Points
1	EXCELR8 Motorsport - Red (Note: The cars of Dan Zelos, Oliver Meadows and Bradley Gravett.)	1649
2	Hybrid Tune	1532
3	Graves Motorsport	1191
4	EXCELR8 Motorsport - Blue (Note: The cars of Thomas Jack Lee, Jordan Kerridge and Josh Porter.)	1069
5	NAPA Racing UK	1001
6	TEAM PETTERS RACING	446

==== Rookie Cup ====
Pos.	Team	Points
1	(United Kingdom) Will Orton	768
2	(United Kingdom) Nelson King	644
3	(United Kingdom) Oliver Meadows	631
4	(United Kingdom) Thomas Jack Lee	551
5	(United Kingdom) Lewis Selby	456
6	(United Kingdom) Josh Porter	439
7	(United Kingdom) Simon Reed	352
8	(United Kingdom) Jordan Kerridge	309
9	(United Kingdom) Marlo Cordell	283
10	(United Kingdom) Daniel Petters	225
11	(United Kingdom) Jamie Petters	221
12	(United Kingdom) Steven Lake	83

==== Graduate Cup ====
Pos.	Team	Points
1	(United Kingdom) Jamie Osborne	529
2	(United Kingdom) Dominic Wheatley	511
3	(United Kingdom) Sam Smith	210
4	(United Kingdom) Barry Ward	210

==== Directors' Cup ====
Pos.	Team	Points
1	(United Kingdom) Joe Tanner	592
2	(United Kingdom) Lewis Selby	456
3	(United Kingdom) Bill Hardy	360
4	(United Kingdom) Simon Reed	352
5	(United Kingdom) Barry Ward	210
6	(United Kingdom) James Griffith	198
7	(United Kingdom) Steven Lake	83

== See also ==
- Vertu Motors
