= 2026 Mini Challenge UK =

Motor racing competition

The 2026 Mini Challenge UK was a British racing series using same-specification Mini Cooper JCW, JCW Sport and Cooper cars across England, Scotland and Wales.

Tom Ovenden won his second consecutive JCW title.

Alfie Garford won the JCW Sport championship, out of 2 full-time drivers.

Alex Keens won his second Cooper championship in a row, the first to do so since 2014.

== Mini Challenge UK ==
The 2026 Power Maxed Mini Challenge UK was a series on the ToCA Support Series bill, currently running the JCW and JCW Sport classes.

=== Teams and drivers ===
Team	No.	Drivers	Rounds
JCW Entries
EXCELR8 Driver Development Programme	1	(United Kingdom) Tom Ovenden	All
EXCELR8 Driver Development Programme	21	(United Kingdom) Nathan Edwards	All
EXCELR8 Driver Development Programme	94	(United Kingdom) Josh Porter	All
EXCELR8 Driver Development Programme	64	(United Kingdom) Harry Hickton	5
Mannpower Motorsport	64	(United Kingdom) Harry Hickton	1–4
Harry Hickton Motorsport	64	(United Kingdom) Harry Hickton	6–7
BPC Motorsport	6	(United Kingdom) Brent Bowie R D	1, 4
BPC Motorsport	55	(United Kingdom) Charlie Hand	1–6
Jamsport Racing UK	10	(United Kingdom) Archie Johnson R	All
Jamsport Racing UK	42	(United Kingdom) Henry Howarth R	2–6
Jamsport Racing UK	90	(United Kingdom) Chase Fernandez R	1
NAPA Racing UK	11	(United Kingdom) Joe Tanner D	All
NAPA Racing UK	15	(United Kingdom) Cameron Richardson	All
Pro Alloys Racing	12	(United Kingdom) Alex Solley	All
Pro Alloys Racing	32	(United Kingdom) Ned Anthony	All
Pro Alloys Racing	33	(United Kingdom) Max Edmundson	All
Pro Alloys Racing	70	(United Kingdom) Owen Hillman	All
Pro Alloys Racing	96	(United Kingdom) Sam Gornall R	All
EXCELR8 Motorsport	13	(United Kingdom) Harry Campey	All
EXCELR8 Motorsport	26	(Turkey) Cemil Çıpa R D	All
EXCELR8 Motorsport	29	(United Kingdom) Will Crooks R D	All
EXCELR8 Motorsport	38	(United Kingdom) Olivier Algieri R	All
SBR Motorsport	48	(United Kingdom) Antony Sullivan R D	All
OX4 Racing	66	(United Kingdom) Alex Brandham D	1–4, 6–7
Bitcoin Racing	210	(United Kingdom) Chris MacKenzie	2–4
JCW Sport Entries
Wera Alliance Racing Academy	8	(United Kingdom) Murray Richardson R	All
Wera Alliance Racing Academy	88	(United Kingdom) Alfie Garford R	All
Speedworks Motorsport	35	(United Kingdom) Eden Spanswick R	1–3
Bitcoin Racing	210	(United Kingdom) Chris MacKenzie	1
Test entries, ineligible for championship points
CTS Motorsport	22	(United Kingdom) Max Bird	1
CTS Motorsport	37	(Latvia) Viesturs Ozols	6
CTS Motorsport	47	(United Kingdom) Gerry Hendry	5
MINI CHALLENGE Development (Note: Ran by EXCELR8 Motorsport.)	27	(United Kingdom) Matt Hammond	7

Icon	Status
R	Eligible for Rookie Cup
D	Eligible for Directors Cup

=== Race calendar ===
The race calendar consisted of 7 triple-header events, with all of them being in support of the British Touring Car Championship. Oulton Park ran with 2 races due to tight schedules, removing the reverse grid race.

Round		Circuit	Date
1	R1	Donington Park National	18–19 April
1	R2	Donington Park National	18–19 April
1	R3	Donington Park National	18–19 April
2	R4	Brands Hatch Indy	9–10 May
2	R5	Brands Hatch Indy	9–10 May
2	R6	Brands Hatch Indy	9–10 May
3	R7	Snetterton Motor Racing Circuit	23–24 May
3	R8	Snetterton Motor Racing Circuit	23–24 May
3	R9	Snetterton Motor Racing Circuit	23–24 May
4	R10	Oulton Park	6–7 June
4	R11	Oulton Park	6–7 June
5	R12	Knockhill Racing Circuit	8–9 August
5	R13	Knockhill Racing Circuit	8–9 August
5	R14	Knockhill Racing Circuit	8–9 August
6	R15	Silverstone Circuit	26–27 September
6	R16	Silverstone Circuit	26–27 September
6	R17	Silverstone Circuit	26–27 September
7	R18	Brands Hatch GP	10–11 October
7	R19	Brands Hatch GP	10–11 October
7	R20	Brands Hatch GP	10–11 October

=== Race results ===
Round		Circuit	Pole position	Fastest lap	Winning driver	Winning team	JCW Sport winner	Director's Cup winner	Rookie Cup winner
1	R1	Donington Park National	(United Kingdom) Tom Ovenden	(United Kingdom) Tom Ovenden	(United Kingdom) Tom Ovenden	(United Kingdom) EXCELR8 Driver Development Programme	(United Kingdom) Alfie Garford	(United Kingdom) Joe Tanner	(United Kingdom) Sam Gornall
1	R2	Donington Park National		(United Kingdom) Tom Ovenden	(United Kingdom) Tom Ovenden	(United Kingdom) EXCELR8 Driver Development Programme	(United Kingdom) Alfie Garford	(United Kingdom) Joe Tanner	(United Kingdom) Olivier Algieri
1	R3	Donington Park National	(United Kingdom) Tom Ovenden	(United Kingdom) Tom Ovenden	(United Kingdom) Tom Ovenden	(United Kingdom) EXCELR8 Driver Development Programme	(United Kingdom) Alfie Garford	(United Kingdom) Joe Tanner	(United Kingdom) Sam Gornall
2	R4	Brands Hatch Indy	(United Kingdom) Harry Hickton (Note: Nathan Edwards and Josh Porter originally set the fastest and second fastest times in qualifying, but were disqualified due to a technical infringement. Harry Hickton, who originally set the third fastest time, was promoted to pole position.)	(United Kingdom) Josh Porter	(United Kingdom) Max Edmundson	(United Kingdom) Pro Alloys Racing	(United Kingdom) Alfie Garford	(United Kingdom) Joe Tanner	(United Kingdom) Olivier Algieri
2	R5	Brands Hatch Indy		(United Kingdom) Sam Gornall	(United Kingdom) Tom Ovenden	(United Kingdom) EXCELR8 Driver Development Programme	(United Kingdom) Alfie Garford	(United Kingdom) Joe Tanner	(United Kingdom) Olivier Algieri
2	R6	Brands Hatch Indy	(United Kingdom) Max Edmundson (Note: Josh Porter and Nathan Edwards originally set the fastest and second fastest times in qualifying, but were disqualified due to a technical infringement. Max Edmundson, who originally set the third fastest time, was promoted to pole position.)	(United Kingdom) Alex Solley	(United Kingdom) Max Edmundson	(United Kingdom) Pro Alloys Racing	(United Kingdom) Alfie Garford	(United Kingdom) Will Crooks	(United Kingdom) Sam Gornall
3	R7	Snetterton Motor Racing Circuit	(United Kingdom) Josh Porter	(United Kingdom) Josh Porter	(United Kingdom) Josh Porter	(United Kingdom) EXCELR8 Driver Development Programme	(United Kingdom) Alfie Garford	(United Kingdom) Will Crooks	(United Kingdom) Olivier Algieri
3	R8	Snetterton Motor Racing Circuit		(United Kingdom) Sam Gornall	(United Kingdom) Charlie Hand	(United Kingdom) BPC Motorsport	(United Kingdom) Alfie Garford	(United Kingdom) Joe Tanner	(United Kingdom) Sam Gornall
3	R9	Snetterton Motor Racing Circuit	(United Kingdom) Josh Porter	(United Kingdom) Sam Gornall	(United Kingdom) Josh Porter	(United Kingdom) EXCELR8 Driver Development Programme	(United Kingdom) Alfie Garford	(United Kingdom) Joe Tanner	(United Kingdom) Olivier Algieri
4	R10	Oulton Park	(United Kingdom) Josh Porter	(United Kingdom) Josh Porter	(United Kingdom) Sam Gornall	(United Kingdom) Pro Alloys Racing	(United Kingdom) Murray Richardson	(United Kingdom) Joe Tanner	(United Kingdom) Sam Gornall
4	R11	Oulton Park	(United Kingdom) Josh Porter	(United Kingdom) Sam Gornall	(United Kingdom) Sam Gornall	(United Kingdom) Pro Alloys Racing	(United Kingdom) Alfie Garford	(United Kingdom) Joe Tanner	(United Kingdom) Sam Gornall
5	R12	Knockhill Racing Circuit	(United Kingdom) Harry Hickton	(United Kingdom) Harry Hickton	(United Kingdom) Harry Hickton	(United Kingdom) EXCELR8 Driver Development Programme	(United Kingdom) Alfie Garford	(United Kingdom) Will Crooks	(United Kingdom) Will Crooks
5	R13	Knockhill Racing Circuit		(United Kingdom) Olivier Algieri	(United Kingdom) Archie Johnson (Note: Harry Campey originally won the race, but later received a penalty of 2 positions for causing a collision. Archie Johnson, initially classified second, thus inherited the win. After an appeal by EXCELR8 Motorsport, the penalty was upheld.)	(United Kingdom) Jamsport Racing UK	(United Kingdom) Alfie Garford	(United Kingdom) Will Crooks	(United Kingdom) Archie Johnson
5	R14	Knockhill Racing Circuit	(United Kingdom) Harry Hickton	(United Kingdom) Harry Hickton	(United Kingdom) Alex Solley (Note: Harry Hickton was the first driver to cross the finish line, but received a 5-second time penalty for being out of position at the start. Alex Solley, who was the second driver to cross the finish line, thus inherited the win.)	(United Kingdom) Pro Alloys Racing	(United Kingdom) Alfie Garford	(United Kingdom) Will Crooks	(United Kingdom) Will Crooks
6	R15	Silverstone Circuit	(United Kingdom) Alex Solley (Note: Harry Hickton originally set the fastest time in qualifying, but was disqualified due to a technical infringement. Alex Solley, who originally set the second fastest time, was promoted to pole position.)	(United Kingdom) Harry Hickton	(United Kingdom) Olivier Algieri	(United Kingdom) EXCELR8 Motorsport	(United Kingdom) Alfie Garford	(United Kingdom) Joe Tanner	(United Kingdom) Olivier Algieri
6	R16	Silverstone Circuit		(United Kingdom) Nathan Edwards	(United Kingdom) Nathan Edwards	(United Kingdom) EXCELR8 Driver Development Programme	(United Kingdom) Alfie Garford	(United Kingdom) Joe Tanner	(United Kingdom) Henry Howarth
6	R17	Silverstone Circuit	(United Kingdom) Olivier Algieri (Note: Harry Hickton originally set the fastest time in qualifying, but was disqualified due to a technical infringement. Olivier Algieri, who originally set the second fastest time, was promoted to pole position.)	(United Kingdom) Harry Hickton	(United Kingdom) Sam Gornall	(United Kingdom) Pro Alloys Racing	(United Kingdom) Murray Richardson	(United Kingdom) Will Crooks	(United Kingdom) Sam Gornall
7	R18	Brands Hatch GP	(United Kingdom) Sam Gornall (Note: Due to multiple incidents in qualifying, none of the drivers were able to complete a second timed lap in order to set the grid for Race 1. As per the rules, the grid for Race 1 was determined by the finishing order of the preceding race which was Race 3 at Silverstone, in which Sam Gornall won.)	(United Kingdom) Alex Solley	(United Kingdom) Nathan Edwards	(United Kingdom) EXCELR8 Driver Development Programme	(United Kingdom) Alfie Garford	(United Kingdom) Joe Tanner	(United Kingdom) Sam Gornall
7	R19	Brands Hatch GP		(United Kingdom) Josh Porter	(United Kingdom) Tom Ovenden	(United Kingdom) EXCELR8 Driver Development Programme	(United Kingdom) Alfie Garford	(United Kingdom) Joe Tanner	(United Kingdom) Sam Gornall
7	R20	Brands Hatch GP	(United Kingdom) Alex Solley	(United Kingdom) Tom Ovenden	(United Kingdom) Max Edmundson	(United Kingdom) Pro Alloys Racing	(United Kingdom) Alfie Garford	(United Kingdom) Joe Tanner	(United Kingdom) Olivier Algieri

=== Championship standings ===
Points are awarded as follows:

Races	1st	2nd	3rd	4th	5th	6th	7th	8th	9th	10th	11th	12th	13th	14th	15th	16th	17th	18th	19th	20th	Pole (R3)	FL
Races	50	44	40	37	34	32	30	28	26	25	24	23	22	21	20	19	18	17	16	15	6	3

==== JCW Drivers' Championship ====
Pos	Driver	DPN			BHI			SNE			OUL		KNO			SIL			BHGP			Pts
Pos	Driver	R1	R2	R3	R4	R5	R6	R7	R8	R9	R10	R11	R12	R13	R14	R15	R16	R17	R18	R19	R20	Pts
1	(United Kingdom) Tom Ovenden	1	1	1	6	1	9	4	6	2	3	4	4	5	6	8	5	5	5	1	7	788
2	(United Kingdom) Max Edmundson	7	2	2	1	3	1	2	10	7	8	16	2	4	2	6	3	2	3	3	1	787
3	(United Kingdom) Alex Solley	8	5	7	10	11	4	6	5	4	14	6	5	2	1	3	Ret	4	4	7	2	668
4	(United Kingdom) Nathan Edwards	3	Ret	5	11	6	8	7	9	8	13	10	3	8	4	4	1	3	1	9	5	640
5	(United Kingdom) Sam Gornall	2	8	3	Ret	9	2	12	2	12	1	1	11	Ret	Ret	11	4	1	2	4	6	638
6	(United Kingdom) Harry Hickton	5	11	9	2	10	5	5	8	5	12	11	1	7	3	5	Ret	16	7	Ret	3	596
7	(United Kingdom) Olivier Algieri	4	4	4	8	2	3	3	Ret	3	6	7	Ret	14	11	1	9	9	6	Ret	4	594
8	(United Kingdom) Josh Porter	Ret	13	11	7	4	12	1	7	1	Ret	Ret	7	6	7	2	6	7	8	2	9	592
9	(United Kingdom) Harry Campey	6	12	14	5	12	10	8	4	6	9	15	6	3	5	9	14	6	11	8	10	572
10	(United Kingdom) Joe Tanner	10	9	6	4	8	Ret	Ret	15	10	2	3	15	16	Ret	10	7	11	9	6	13	480
11	(United Kingdom) Cameron Richardson	11	7	12	14	16	13	11	13	16	7	8	9	9	9	13	11	DSQ	13	10	11	466
12	(United Kingdom) Ned Anthony	13	6	Ret	13	14	20	13	14	14	10	12	8	11	8	14	Ret	13	16	11	12	424
13	(United Kingdom) Will Crooks	15	14	13	15	18	11	14	22	13	15	14	10	10	10	15	12	10	12	13	Ret	423
14	(United Kingdom) Charlie Hand	9	3	Ret	3	5	7	10	1	9	4	2	Ret	Ret	Ret	Ret	8	12				408
15	(Turkey) Cemil Çıpa	DSQ	17	10	17	19	15	17	16	15	16	13	18	12	12	12	10	15	14	14	15	403
16	(United Kingdom) Archie Johnson	22	Ret	Ret	12	13	Ret	DSQ	12	18	5	9	12	1	15	21	13	8	DNS	5	8	391
17	(United Kingdom) Owen Hillman	14	16	8	9	7	19	15	11	Ret	18	21	Ret	DNS	DNS	Ret	Ret	14	10	15	16	315
18	(United Kingdom) Antony Sullivan	18	Ret	18	20	Ret	Ret	19	21	Ret	Ret	18	13	13	13	16	15	17	Ret	16	18	270
19	(United Kingdom) Alex Brandham	19	18	DNS	16	17	14	18	18	17	17	17				17	17	18	Ret	Ret	DNS	246
20	(United Kingdom) Chris MacKenzie				19	Ret	DNS	16	17	Ret												56
21	(United Kingdom) Chase Fernandez	16	Ret	15																		40
22	(United Kingdom) Brent Bowie	Ret	Ret	19									14	DNS	DNS							39
Guest drivers ineligible for points
—	(United Kingdom) Henry Howarth				23	15	6	9	3	11	11	5	WD	WD	WD	7	2	DSQ				–
—	(United Kingdom) Max Bird	12	10	Ret																		–
—	(United Kingdom) Matt Hammond																		15	12	14	–
—	(Latvia) Viesturs Ozols															18	16	19				–
—	(United Kingdom) Gerry Hendry												16	Ret	Ret							–
Pos	Driver	DPN			BHI			SNE			OUL		KNO			SIL			BHGP			Pts

==== JCW Teams' Championship ====
Pos	Team	Pts
1	EXCELR8 Driver Development Programme	1428
2	Pro Alloys Racing – Yellow (Note: The cars of Max Edmundson and Sam Gornall.)	1425
3	EXCELR8 Motorsport – Red (Note: The cars of Harry Campey and Olivier Algieri.)	1166
4	Pro Alloys Racing – Orange (Note: The cars of Alex Solley and Ned Anthony.)	1092
5	NAPA Racing UK	946
6	EXCELR8 Motorsport – Blue (Note: The cars of Cemil Çıpa and Will Crooks.)	826
7	BPC Motorsport	447
8	Jamsport Racing UK	431

==== JCW Rookie Cup ====
Pos	Team	Pts
1	(United Kingdom) Sam Gornall	808
2	(United Kingdom) Olivier Algieri	772
3	(United Kingdom) Will Crooks	752
4	(Turkey) Cemil Çıpa	704
5	(United Kingdom) Archie Johnson	596
6	(United Kingdom) Antony Sullivan	473
7	(United Kingdom) Chris MacKenzie	108
8	(United Kingdom) Chase Fernandez	71
9	(United Kingdom) Brent Bowie	64

==== JCW Directors Cup ====
Pos	Team	Pts
1	(United Kingdom) Will Crooks	842
2	(United Kingdom) Joe Tanner	768
3	(Turkey) Cemil Çıpa	740
4	(United Kingdom) Alex Brandham	495
5	(United Kingdom) Antony Sullivan	454
6	(United Kingdom) Brent Bowie	74

==== JCW Sport Standings ====
Pos	Driver	DPN			BHI			SNE			OUL		KNO			SIL			BHGP			Pts
Pos	Driver	R1	R2	R3	R4	R5	R6	R7	R8	R9	R10	R11	R12	R13	R14	R15	R16	R17	R18	R19	R20	Pts
1	(United Kingdom) Alfie Garford	17	15	16	18	20	16	20	19	19	20	19	17	15	14	20	18	21	17	17	17	1075
2	(United Kingdom) Murray Richardson	21	20	20	22	Ret	18	21	20	20	19	20	19	17	16	20	Ret	20	18	18	19	799
3	(United Kingdom) Eden Spanswick	Ret	21	21	21	21	17	WD	WD	WD												206
4	(United Kingdom) Chris MacKenzie	20	19	17																		132
Pos	Driver	DPN			BHI			SNE			OUL		KNO			SIL			BHGP			Pts

==== JCW Sport Rookie Cup ====
Pos	Team	Pts
1	(United Kingdom) Alfie Garford	988
2	(United Kingdom) Murray Richardson	796
3	(United Kingdom) Eden Spanswick	212

== Mini Challenge Trophy ==
The 2026 Mairon Motorsport Mini Challenge Trophy is a series which currently runs the Cooper class.

=== Teams and drivers ===
Team	No.	Drivers	Rounds
Graves Motorsport	1	(United Kingdom) Alex Keens	All
Graves Motorsport	23	(Republic of Ireland) Leo Richardson R	All
Graves Motorsport	72	(United Kingdom) Matt Luff	All
Duckhams Yuasa Racing by Graves Motorsport	31	(United Kingdom) Will Foulkes R	5
SBR Motorsport	5	(United Kingdom) Marc Webb	7
PerformanceTek Racing	5	(United Kingdom) Jonathan Wild R	1–3
PerformanceTek Racing	18	(United Kingdom) Daniel Patterson D R	1–3
PerformanceTek Racing	32	(United Kingdom) Blair Dryburgh D R	All
PerformanceTek Racing	11	(United Kingdom) Harry Smith	4–7
Musketeer Motorsport	11	(United Kingdom) Harry Smith	1–3
Wera Alliance Racing Academy	8	(United Kingdom) Ellena Reece R	All
Wera Alliance Racing Academy	80	(United Kingdom) Liona Theobald R	All
Wera Alliance Racing Academy	111	(United Kingdom) Beanie Reece R	All
Wera Alliance Racing Academy	333	(United Kingdom) Lexie Powell R	All
Race Car Consultants	9	(United Kingdom) Christopher Doble R	1
Race Car Consultants	19	(United Kingdom) Christopher Doble R	2–7
Race Car Consultants	65	(United Kingdom) Isaac Doble R	All
Race Car Consultants	138	(United Kingdom) Henry Foote	All
MRM	10	(United Kingdom) Josh Selvadorai R	All
Pro-AM Racing	12	(United Kingdom) Richard Jepp D R	All
EXCELR8 Motorsport	14	(United Kingdom) Dominic Wheatley	6–7
EXCELR8 Motorsport	22	(United Kingdom) Ashley Gregory	All
EXCELR8 Motorsport	24	(United Kingdom) Jorrel Julius R	1–6
EXCELR8 Motorsport	71	(United States) Giovanni Santora R	1–4
EXCELR8 Motorsport	82	(United Kingdom) Adam Curtis D R	All
Westbourne Motorsport	21	(United Kingdom) James Colburn	6–7
Westbourne Motorsport	59	(United Kingdom) Rhys Hurd	4–5
Westbourne Motorsport	69	(Australia) Ryan Walkinshaw D R	7
Westbourne Motorsport	81	(Italy) Luca Marinoni Osborne	All
Team Avago	27	(United Kingdom) Charlie Edge R	7
Team Avago	95	(United Kingdom) Joshua Wilby	All
Team Avago	610	(United Kingdom) Louis Fleet	All
Allgroom Motorsport	91	(United Kingdom) Finley Groom R	1–6
Privateer	185	(United Kingdom) Jenson Mason	4

Icon	Status
R	Eligible for Rookie Cup
D	Eligible for Directors Cup

=== Race calendar ===
The calendar consisted of 7 triple-header events.

Round		Circuit	Date
1	R1	Silverstone National	4–5 April
1	R2	Silverstone National	4–5 April
1	R3	Silverstone National	4–5 April
2	R4	Snetterton Motor Racing Circuit	23–24 May
2	R5	Snetterton Motor Racing Circuit	23–24 May
2	R6	Snetterton Motor Racing Circuit	23–24 May
3	R7	Pembrey Circuit	20–21 June
3	R8	Pembrey Circuit	20–21 June
3	R9	Pembrey Circuit	20–21 June
4	R10	Thruxton Circuit	25–26 July
4	R11	Thruxton Circuit	25–26 July
4	R12	Thruxton Circuit	25–26 July
5	R13	Donington Park GP	22–23 August
5	R14	Donington Park GP	22–23 August
5	R15	Donington Park GP	22–23 August
6	R16	Croft Circuit	5–6 September
6	R17	Croft Circuit	5–6 September
6	R18	Croft Circuit	5–6 September
7	R19	Brands Hatch Indy	31 October–1 November
7	R20	Brands Hatch Indy	31 October–1 November
7	R21	Brands Hatch Indy	31 October–1 November

=== Race results ===
Round		Circuit	Pole position	Fastest lap	Winning driver	Winning team	Director's Cup winner	Rookie Cup winner
1	R1	Silverstone National	(United Kingdom) Matt Luff	(Italy) Luca Marinoni Osborne	(United Kingdom) Matt Luff (Note: Joshua Wilby originally won the race, but later received a penalty of 3 positions for gaining an unfair advantage. Luca Marinoni Osborne, who was originally classified second, received a penalty of 8 positions for causing a collision. Matt Luff, initially classified third, thus inherited the win.)	(United Kingdom) Graves Motorsport	(United Kingdom) Richard Jepp	(United Kingdom) Christopher Doble
1	R2	Silverstone National		(United Kingdom) Alex Keens	(United Kingdom) Alex Keens	(United Kingdom) Graves Motorsport	(United Kingdom) Richard Jepp	(United Kingdom) Christopher Doble
1	R3	Silverstone National	(United Kingdom) Matt Luff	(United Kingdom) Matt Luff	(United Kingdom) Alex Keens	(United Kingdom) Graves Motorsport	(United Kingdom) Richard Jepp	(United Kingdom) Richard Jepp
2	R4	Snetterton Motor Racing Circuit	(Italy) Luca Marinoni Osborne	(United Kingdom) Ashley Gregory	(Italy) Luca Marinoni Osborne	(United Kingdom) Westbourne Motorsport	(United Kingdom) Richard Jepp	(United Kingdom) Josh Selvadorai
2	R5	Snetterton Motor Racing Circuit		(United Kingdom) Josh Selvadorai	(United Kingdom) Alex Keens	(United Kingdom) Graves Motorsport	(United Kingdom) Daniel Patterson	(United Kingdom) Josh Selvadorai
2	R6	Snetterton Motor Racing Circuit	(Italy) Luca Marinoni Osborne	(United Kingdom) Alex Keens	(Italy) Luca Marinoni Osborne (Note: Joshua Wilby was the first driver to cross the finish line, but received a 5-second time penalty for track limits. Luca Marinoni Osborne, who the second driver to cross the finish line, thus inherited the win.)	(United Kingdom) Westbourne Motorsport	(United Kingdom) Daniel Patterson	(United Kingdom) Isaac Doble
3	R7	Pembrey Circuit	(United Kingdom) Matt Luff	(United Kingdom) Alex Keens	(United Kingdom) Alex Keens	(United Kingdom) Graves Motorsport	(United Kingdom) Richard Jepp	(United Kingdom) Josh Selvadorai
3	R8	Pembrey Circuit		(United Kingdom) Alex Keens	(United Kingdom) Josh Selvadorai	(United Kingdom) MRM	(United Kingdom) Richard Jepp	(United Kingdom) Josh Selvadorai
3	R9	Pembrey Circuit	(United Kingdom) Matt Luff	(United Kingdom) Joshua Wilby	(United Kingdom) Matt Luff	(United Kingdom) Graves Motorsport	(United Kingdom) Richard Jepp	(United Kingdom) Josh Selvadorai
4	R10	Thruxton Circuit	(United Kingdom) Jenson Mason	(United Kingdom) Matt Luff	(United Kingdom) Alex Keens (Note: Rhys Hurd originally won the race, but later received a penalty of 1 position for gaining an unfair advantage. Alex Keens, initially classified second, thus inherited the win.)	(United Kingdom) Graves Motorsport	(United Kingdom) Richard Jepp	(United Kingdom) Josh Selvadorai
4	R11	Thruxton Circuit		(United Kingdom) Josh Selvadorai	(United Kingdom) Josh Selvadorai	(United Kingdom) MRM	(United Kingdom) Richard Jepp	(United Kingdom) Josh Selvadorai
4	R12	Thruxton Circuit	(United Kingdom) Jenson Mason	(United Kingdom) Joshua Wilby	(United Kingdom) Rhys Hurd (Note: Joshua Wilby originally won the race, but later received a penalty of 4 positions for causing a collision. Rhys Hurd, initially classified second, thus inherited the win.)	(United Kingdom) Westbourne Motorsport	(United Kingdom) Richard Jepp	(United Kingdom) Richard Jepp
5	R13	Donington Park GP	(United Kingdom) Henry Foote	(United Kingdom) Henry Foote	(United Kingdom) Rhys Hurd	(United Kingdom) Westbourne Motorsport	(United Kingdom) Richard Jepp	(United Kingdom) Josh Selvadorai
5	R14	Donington Park GP		(United Kingdom) Jorrel Julius	(United Kingdom) Rhys Hurd	(United Kingdom) Westbourne Motorsport	(United Kingdom) Richard Jepp	(Republic of Ireland) Leo Richardson
5	R15	Donington Park GP	(United Kingdom) Henry Foote	(United Kingdom) Richard Jepp	(United Kingdom) Rhys Hurd	(United Kingdom) Westbourne Motorsport	(United Kingdom) Blair Dryburgh	(United Kingdom) Christopher Doble
6	R16	Croft Circuit	(United Kingdom) Alex Keens	(Italy) Luca Marinoni Osborne	(United Kingdom) Richard Jepp	(United Kingdom) Pro-AM Racing	(United Kingdom) Richard Jepp	(United Kingdom) Richard Jepp
6	R17	Croft Circuit	(United Kingdom) Richard Jepp	(United Kingdom) Matt Luff	(United Kingdom) Richard Jepp	(United Kingdom) Pro-AM Racing	(United Kingdom) Richard Jepp	(United Kingdom) Richard Jepp
7	R18	Brands Hatch Indy	(United Kingdom) Alex Keens	(United Kingdom) Dominic Wheatley	(United Kingdom) Josh Selvadorai	(United Kingdom) MRM	(United Kingdom) Richard Jepp	(United Kingdom) Josh Selvadorai
7	R19	Brands Hatch Indy		(United Kingdom) Dominic Wheatley	(Italy) Luca Marinoni Osborne	(United Kingdom) Westbourne Motorsport	(United Kingdom) Blair Dryburgh	(United Kingdom) Isaac Doble
7	R20	Brands Hatch Indy	(United Kingdom) Alex Keens	(United Kingdom) Harry Smith	(United Kingdom) Josh Selvadorai	(United Kingdom) MRM	(United Kingdom) Richard Jepp	(United Kingdom) Josh Selvadorai

=== Championship standings ===
Points are awarded as follows:

Races	1st	2nd	3rd	4th	5th	6th	7th	8th	9th	10th	11th	12th	13th	14th	15th	16th	17th	18th	19th	20th	Pole (R3)	FL
Races	50	44	40	37	34	32	30	28	26	25	24	23	22	21	20	19	18	17	16	15	6	3

==== Drivers' Championship ====
Pos	Driver	SIL			SNE			PEM			THR			DPGP			CRO		BHI			Pts
Pos	Driver	R1	R2	R3	R4	R5	R6	R7	R8	R9	R10	R11	R12	R13	R14	R15	R16	R17	R18	R19	R20	Pts
1	(United Kingdom) Alex Keens	2	1	1	11	1	10	1	9	2	1	4	4	5	3	3	3	3	2	6	4	838
2	(United Kingdom) Matt Luff	1	3	2	3	9	6	2	3	1	4	2	3	7	2	6	6	6	3	2	3	826
3	(Italy) Luca Marinoni Osborne	9	7	3	1	3	1	3	5	3	5	6	2	3	7	19	4	2	8	1	14	765
4	(United Kingdom) Josh Selvadorai	18	5	6	4	2	22	4	1	4	3	1	21	4	6	Ret	2	15	1	4	1	695
5	(United Kingdom) Joshua Wilby	3	2	4	2	18	5	6	10	9	6	9	5	2	14	4	11	9	7	8	6	667
6	(United Kingdom) Harry Smith	8	6	10	5	7	4	10	2	7	8	5	7	6	Ret	7	8	Ret	6	7	2	591
7	(United Kingdom) Richard Jepp	13	9	5	10	Ret	13	7	8	10	7	12	6	11	9	Ret	1	1	4	18	8	552
8	(United Kingdom) Isaac Doble	7	10	11	9	5	7	19	14	8	10	16	11	12	8	5	12	8	11	3	11	545
9	(United Kingdom) Ashley Gregory	4	DSQ	7	7	4	2	9	12	Ret	9	14	8	9	12	8	7	7	12	13	7	542
10	(United Kingdom) Christopher Doble	5	4	9	12	16	9	8	7	5	14	15	13	15	13	2	Ret	Ret	9	5	9	511
11	(Republic of Ireland) Leo Richardson	22	8	14	8	Ret	8	18	6	6	17	7	10	10	4	10	9	Ret	13	10	10	475
12	(United Kingdom) Blair Dryburgh	23	18	21	22	15	18	13	11	14	22	17	15	19	19	16	15	10	15	14	16	398
13	(United Kingdom) Liona Theobald	14	15	17	14	13	14	12	18	16	15	22	12	16	17	13	Ret	11	17	21	18	394
14	(United Kingdom) Jorrel Julius	10	11	8	13	12	Ret	Ret	DNS	11	12	8	17	14	11	9	14	17				343
15	(United Kingdom) Henry Foote	Ret	DNS	DNS	6	6	3	5	4	13	23	10	9	8	5	Ret						342
16	(United Kingdom) Lexie Powell	17	14	19	21	17	16	Ret	15	17	16	24	20	21	20	15	17	14	19	16	DNS	336
17	(United Kingdom) Beanie Reece	12	Ret	15	17	Ret	WD	14	13	15	21	20	18	17	15	12	Ret	13	18	20	15	328
18	(United Kingdom) Ellena Reece	20	19	20	23	Ret	21	17	19	18	19	18	19	20	18	14	18	18	20	15	DNS	319
19	(United Kingdom) Louis Fleet	11	Ret	12	19	19	15	11	DNS	12	Ret	19	14	18	16	17	16	12	16	Ret	DNS	314
20	(United Kingdom) Adam Curtis	21	17	22	24	Ret	19	15	16	20	18	23	22	22	21	18	Ret	13	Ret	19	19	290
21	(United Kingdom) Finley Groom	16	12	16	20	14	20	DSQ	Ret	Ret	20	21	16	23	Ret	WD	13	16				225
22	(United States) Giovanni Santora	6	Ret	DNS	15	8	11	16	17	19	13	11	Ret									206
23	(United Kingdom) Daniel Patterson	15	13	13	16	10	12															131
24	(United Kingdom) Jonathan Wild	19	16	18	18	11	17															111
Guest drivers ineligible for championship points
—	(United Kingdom) Rhys Hurd										2	13	1	1	1	1						–
—	(United Kingdom) Jenson Mason										11	3	Ret (Note: Jenson Mason took pole position in race 3 at Thruxton, but he was ineligible to score points due to competing as a guest driver, so the 6 points for pole position were awarded to Alex Keens.)									–
—	(United Kingdom) James Colburn																5	4	14	11	13	–
—	(United Kingdom) Dominic Wheatley																10	5	5 (Note: Dominic Wheatley set the fastest lap in Race 1 at Brands Hatch Indy, but he was ineligible to score points due to competing as a guest driver, so the 3 points for fastest lap were awarded to Luca Marinoni Osborne.)	9 (Note: Dominic Wheatley set the fastest lap in Race 2 at Brands Hatch Indy, but he was ineligible to score points due to competing as a guest driver, so the 3 points for fastest lap were awarded to Alex Keens.)	5	–
—	(United Kingdom) Charlie Edge																		10	12	12	–
—	(Australia) Ryan Walkinshaw																		21	17	17	–
—	(United Kingdom) Marc Webb																		Ret	Ret	DNS	–
Pos	Driver	SIL			SNE			PEM			THR			DPGP			CRO		BHI			Pts

==== Teams' Championship ====
Pos	Team	Pts
1	Graves Motorsport	1664
2	Team Avago	981
3	EXCELR8 Motorsport – Red (Note: The cars of Ashley Gregory and Adam Curtis.)	832
4	PerformanceTek Racing – Red (Note: The cars of Harry Smith and Daniel Patterson.)	722
5	Wera Alliance Racing Academy – Red (Note: The cars of Liona Theobald and Beanie Reece.)	722
6	Wera Alliance Racing Academy – Blue (Note: The cars of Lexie Powell and Ellena Reece.)	655
7	Race Car Consultants	618
8	EXCELR8 Motorsport – Blue (Note: The cars of Jorrel Julius and Giovanni Santora.)	549
9	PerformanceTek Racing – Blue (Note: The cars of Blair Dryburgh and Jonathan Wild.)	509

==== Directors' Cup ====
Pos	Team	Pts
1	(United Kingdom) Richard Jepp	888
2	(United Kingdom) Blair Dryburgh	862
3	(United Kingdom) Adam Curtis	679
4	(United Kingdom) Daniel Patterson	276

==== Rookie Cup ====
Pos	Team	Pts
1	(United Kingdom) Josh Selvadorai	818
2	(United Kingdom) Isaac Doble	766
3	(United Kingdom) Richard Jepp	724
4	(United Kingdom) Christopher Doble	692
5	(Republic of Ireland) Leo Richardson	680
6	(United Kingdom) Blair Dryburgh	556
7	(United Kingdom) Liona Theobald	556
8	(United Kingdom) Jorrel Julius	476
9	(United Kingdom) Lexie Powell	466
10	(United Kingdom) Beanie Reece	463
11	(United Kingdom) Ellena Reece	444
12	(United Kingdom) Adam Curtis	401
13	(United Kingdom) Finley Groom	317
14	(United States) Giovanni Santora	296
15	(United Kingdom) Daniel Patterson	185
16	(United Kingdom) Jonathan Wild	155
