= 2025 Mini Challenge UK =

Motor racing competition

The 2025 Vertu Motors Mini Challenge UK was the 24th running of Mini Challenge UK, ran primarily in England and Scotland.

The season was the second with the newest JCW Sport category, running alongside the new mainstay JCW class.

Tom Ovenden (car pictured in 2026) won his first JCW title.

Max Edmundson (car pictured in 2026) placed second, 105 points behind Ovenden.

NAPA Racing UK (car pictured in 2026) won the JCW Teams' Championship.

== Teams and drivers ==
| Team | No. | Drivers | Rounds |
JCW Entries
| JRW Motorsport | 2 | (United Kingdom) Albert Webster R | 1–4, 7 |
| EXCELR8 Motorsport | 8 | (United Kingdom) Nathan Harrison | 7 |
| EXCELR8 Motorsport | 13 | (United Kingdom) Harry Campey R | All |
| EXCELR8 Motorsport | 27 | (United Kingdom) Marlo Cordell | 1–4 |
| EXCELR8 Motorsport | 47 | (United Kingdom) Gerry Hendry R | 5 |
| NAPA Racing UK | 12 | (United Kingdom) Alex Solley R | All |
| NAPA Racing UK | 15 | (United Kingdom) Cameron Richardson R | All |
| NAPA Racing UK | 18 | (United Kingdom) Lewis Selby | All |
| NAPA Racing UK | 28 | (United Kingdom) Nick Tandy | 7 |
| NAPA Racing UK | 77 | (United Kingdom) Jamie Osborne | 1–5 |
| EXCELR8 Motorsport Driver Development Programme | 21 | (United Kingdom) Nathan Edwards | All |
| EXCELR8 Motorsport Driver Development Programme | 24 | (United Kingdom) Tom Ovenden | All |
| EXCELR8 Motorsport Driver Development Programme | 94 | (United Kingdom) Josh Porter | All |
| Amigo Motorsport | 32 | (United Kingdom) Ned Anthony R | All |
| Pro Alloys Racing | 33 | (United Kingdom) Max Edmundson | All |
| Pro Alloys Racing | 70 | (United Kingdom) Owen Hillman R | All |
| Jamsport Racing UK | 45 | (United Kingdom) Jenson O'Neill-Going R | 6–7 |
| Mannpower Motorsport | 55 | (United Kingdom) Charlie Hand R | All |
| Mannpower Motorsport | 64 | (United Kingdom) Harry Hickton R | All |
| Race Car Consultants | 95 | (United Kingdom) Jacob Hodgkiss R | 1–5 |
JCW Sport Entries
| Jamsport Racing UK | 10 | (United Kingdom) Archie Johnson R | All |
| Jamsport Racing UK | 22 | (Malta) Nicky Gauci R | All |
| Jamsport Racing UK | 42 | (United Kingdom) Henry Howarth R | All |
| EXCELR8 Motorsport | 29 | (United Kingdom) Will Crooks R | All |
| JRW Motorsport | 56 | (United Kingdom) Ben Crossley | All |
| Bitcoin Racing | 210 | (United Kingdom) Chris MacKenzie | All |
Test Entries
| Chandler Motorsport (Development) | 7 | (United Kingdom) Steven Chandler | 1–2 |
| Chandler Motorsport (Development) | 69 | (United Kingdom) Brent Bowie | 4–7 |
| OX4 Racing | 66 | (United Kingdom) Alex Brandham R | 5–7 |

== Race calendar ==
| Rd | | Circuit | Date |
|---|---|---|---|
| 1 | R1 | Donington Park National | 26–27 April |
| 1 | R2 | Donington Park National | 26–27 April |
| 1 | R3 | Donington Park National | 26–27 April |
| 2 | R4 | Snetterton Motor Racing Circuit | 24–25 May |
| 2 | R5 | Snetterton Motor Racing Circuit | 24–25 May |
| 2 | R6 | Snetterton Motor Racing Circuit | 24–25 May |
| 3 | R7 | Oulton Park | 21–22 June |
| 3 | R8 | Oulton Park | 21–22 June |
| 4 | R9 | Croft Circuit | 2–3 August |
| 4 | R10 | Croft Circuit | 2–3 August |
| 5 | R11 | Knockhill Racing Circuit | 16–17 August |
| 5 | R12 | Knockhill Racing Circuit | 16–17 August |
| 5 | R13 | Knockhill Racing Circuit | 16–17 August |
| 6 | R14 | Silverstone National | 20–21 September |
| 6 | R15 | Silverstone National | 20–21 September |
| 6 | R16 | Silverstone National | 20–21 September |
| 7 | R17 | Brands Hatch GP | 4–5 October |
| 7 | R18 | Brands Hatch GP | 4–5 October |
| 7 | R19 | Brands Hatch GP | 4–5 October |

== Results and standings ==
=== Race results ===
| Round | | Circuit | Pole position | Fastest lap | Winning driver | Winning team | JCW Sport winner | Rookie Cup winner |
|---|---|---|---|---|---|---|---|---|
| 1 | R1 | Donington Park National | (United Kingdom) Tom Ovenden | (United Kingdom) Lewis Selby | (United Kingdom) Jamie Osborne | (United Kingdom) NAPA Racing UK | (United Kingdom) Henry Howarth | (United Kingdom) Jacob Hodgkiss |
| 1 | R2 | Donington Park National | | (United Kingdom) Jamie Osborne | (United Kingdom) Jamie Osborne | (United Kingdom) NAPA Racing UK | (United Kingdom) Archie Johnson | (United Kingdom) Steven Chandler |
| 1 | R3 | Donington Park National | (United Kingdom) Tom Ovenden | (United Kingdom) Jamie Osborne | (United Kingdom) Jamie Osborne | (United Kingdom) NAPA Racing UK | (United Kingdom) Henry Howarth | (United Kingdom) Jacob Hodgkiss |
| 2 | R1 | Snetterton Circuit | (United Kingdom) Tom Ovenden | (United Kingdom) Nathan Edwards | (United Kingdom) Tom Ovenden | (United Kingdom) EXCELR8 Driver Development Programme | (United Kingdom) Chris MacKenzie | (United Kingdom) Max Edmundson |
| 2 | R2 | Snetterton Circuit | | (United Kingdom) Max Edmundson | (United Kingdom) Jamie Osborne | (United Kingdom) NAPA Racing UK | (United Kingdom) Henry Howarth | (United Kingdom) Max Edmundson |
| 2 | R3 | Snetterton Circuit | (United Kingdom) Jamie Osborne | (United Kingdom) Harry Hickton | (United Kingdom) Jamie Osborne | (United Kingdom) NAPA Racing UK | (United Kingdom) Ben Crossley | (United Kingdom) Max Edmundson |
| 3 | R1 | Oulton Park | (United Kingdom) Tom Ovenden | (United Kingdom) Harry Hickton | (United Kingdom) Max Edmundson | (United Kingdom) Pro Alloys Racing | (United Kingdom) Henry Howarth | (United Kingdom) Max Edmundson |
| 3 | R2 | Oulton Park | (United Kingdom) Tom Ovenden | (United Kingdom) Harry Campey | (United Kingdom) Lewis Selby | (United Kingdom) NAPA Racing UK | (Malta) Nicky Gauci | (United Kingdom) Ned Anthony |
| 4 | R1 | Croft Circuit | (United Kingdom) Nathan Edwards | (United Kingdom) Nathan Edwards | (United Kingdom) Tom Ovenden | (United Kingdom) EXCELR8 Driver Development Programme | (United Kingdom) Chris MacKenzie | (United Kingdom) Harry Hickton |
| 4 | R2 | Croft Circuit | (United Kingdom) Nathan Edwards | (United Kingdom) Nathan Edwards | (United Kingdom) Nathan Edwards | (United Kingdom) EXCELR8 Driver Development Programme | (United Kingdom) Archie Johnson | (United Kingdom) Harry Hickton |
| 5 | R1 | Knockhill | (United Kingdom) Nathan Edwards | (United Kingdom) Nathan Edwards | (United Kingdom) Nathan Edwards | (United Kingdom) EXCELR8 Driver Development Programme | (United Kingdom) Archie Johnson | (United Kingdom) Harry Hickton |
| 5 | R2 | Knockhill | | (United Kingdom) Max Edmundson | (United Kingdom) Josh Porter | (United Kingdom) EXCELR8 Driver Development Programme | (United Kingdom) Henry Howarth | (United Kingdom) Owen Hillman |
| 5 | R3 | Knockhill | (United Kingdom) Nathan Edwards | (United Kingdom) Max Edmundson | (United Kingdom) Max Edmundson | (United Kingdom) Pro Alloys Racing | (United Kingdom) Archie Johnson | (United Kingdom) Max Edmundson |
| 6 | R1 | Silverstone National | (United Kingdom) Max Edmundson | (United Kingdom) Max Edmundson | (United Kingdom) Max Edmundson | (United Kingdom) Pro Alloys Racing | (United Kingdom) Archie Johnson | (United Kingdom) Max Edmundson |
| 6 | R2 | Silverstone National | | (United Kingdom) Harry Hickton | (United Kingdom) Max Edmundson | (United Kingdom) Pro Alloys Racing | (United Kingdom) Archie Johnson | (United Kingdom) Max Edmundson |
| 6 | R3 | Silverstone National | (United Kingdom) Nathan Edwards | (United Kingdom) Nathan Edwards | (United Kingdom) Nathan Edwards | (United Kingdom) EXCELR8 Driver Development Programme | (United Kingdom) Archie Johnson | (United Kingdom) Max Edmundson |
| 7 | R1 | Brands Hatch GP | (United Kingdom) Nathan Edwards | (United Kingdom) Nathan Edwards | (United Kingdom) Nathan Edwards | (United Kingdom) EXCELR8 Driver Development Programme | (United Kingdom) Henry Howarth | (United Kingdom) Charlie Hand |
| 7 | R2 | Brands Hatch GP | | (United Kingdom) Nathan Edwards | (United Kingdom) Nick Tandy | (United Kingdom) NAPA Racing UK | (United Kingdom) Archie Johnson | (United Kingdom) Charlie Hand |
| 7 | R3 | Brands Hatch GP | (United Kingdom) Nathan Edwards | (United Kingdom) Nick Tandy | (United Kingdom) Nick Tandy | (United Kingdom) NAPA Racing UK | (United Kingdom) Ben Crossley | (United Kingdom) Max Edmundson |

=== Championship standings ===
Points system
| Races | 1st | 2nd | 3rd | 4th | 5th | 6th | 7th | 8th | 9th | 10th | 11th | 12th | 13th | 14th | 15th | 16th | 17th | 18th | 19th | 20th | Fastest lap | Pole position |
| Races | 50 | 44 | 40 | 37 | 34 | 32 | 30 | 28 | 26 | 25 | 24 | 23 | 22 | 21 | 20 | 19 | 18 | 17 | 16 | 15 | 3 | 6 |

==== JCW Drivers' Championship ====
| Pos. | Driver | DPN | | | SNE | | | OUL | | CRO | | KNO | | | SIL | | | BHGP | | | Pts |
|---|---|---|---|---|---|---|---|---|---|---|---|---|---|---|---|---|---|---|---|---|---|
| 1 | (United Kingdom) Tom Ovenden | 5 | 3 | 2 | 1 | 15 | 2 | 2 | 4 | 1 | 3 | 6 | 3 | 4 | 6 | 2 | 5 | 3 | 8 | 4 | 750 |
| 2 | (United Kingdom) Max Edmundson | 8 | 5 | Ret | 2 | 2 | 3 | 1 | 7 | Ret | 8 | 13 | 21 | 1 | 1 | 1 | 2 | Ret | 5 | 2 | 645 |
| 3 | (United Kingdom) Lewis Selby | 2 | 20 | 3 | 5 | 6 | 4 | 3 | 1 | 4 | 4 | 3 | 8 | 2 | 2 | Ret | 4 | 21 | 22 | 9 | 623 |
| 4 | (United Kingdom) Nathan Edwards | 4 | 21 | 15 | 16 | 12 | Ret | Ret | 5 | 2 | 1 | 1 | Ret | Ret | 3 | 3 | 1 | 1 | 3 | 3 | 614 |
| 5 | (United Kingdom) Josh Porter | Ret | 8 | 4 | 12 | 3 | 6 | 8 | 3 | 9 | 10 | 8 | 1 | 20 | 7 | 6 | 6 | 5 | 14 | 6 | 578 |
| 6 | (United Kingdom) Jamie Osborne | 1 | 1 | 1 | 3 | 1 | 1 | 16 | 2 | 3 | 2 | 2 | 2 | 19 | | | | | | | 564 |
| 7 | (United Kingdom) Charlie Hand | Ret | 14 | 8 | 4 | 4 | 8 | 7 | 12 | Ret | 7 | 10 | 14 | 6 | 9 | 5 | 9 | 6 | 2 | 8 | 522 |
| 8 | (United Kingdom) Harry Campey | 12 | 10 | 9 | 9 | 7 | 13 | 9 | 10 | 10 | 13 | 11 | 6 | 9 | 8 | 8 | 7 | 8 | 7 | 10 | 522 |
| 9 | (United Kingdom) Alex Solley | 11 | 11 | Ret | 8 | 13 | 9 | 5 | Ret | 8 | Ret | 7 | 9 | 7 | 4 | 7 | 8 | 9 | 6 | 7 | 475 |
| 10 | (United Kingdom) Cameron Richardson | 7 | 12 | 14 | 15 | 14 | 12 | 18 | 9 | 11 | 11 | 9 | 10 | 10 | 11 | 10 | 10 | 11 | 12 | 14 | 469 |
| 11 | (United Kingdom) Harry Hickton | Ret | 7 | Ret | 10 | 5 | 5 | 19 | 11 | 5 | 5 | 4 | 5 | 5 | 5 | 4 | 3 | Ret | Ret | WD | 463 |
| 12 | (United Kingdom) Ned Anthony | Ret | 13 | 10 | 14 | 21 | 11 | 10 | 6 | 12 | Ret | 17 | 7 | 12 | 10 | 9 | 11 | 12 | 10 | 12 | 425 |
| 13 | (United Kingdom) Owen Hillman | 13 | 19 | 16 | 13 | 11 | 14 | 11 | 13 | Ret | 12 | 5 | 4 | 3 | 13 | Ret | Ret | 10 | 9 | 13 | 424 |
| 14 | (United Kingdom) Jacob Hodgkiss | 6 | 9 | 5 | 7 | 8 | 15 | 20 | 8 | 7 | 6 | 14 | 11 | 8 | | | | | | | 357 |
| 15 | (United Kingdom) Albert Webster | 9 | 6 | 7 | 6 | 9 | 7 | 4 | 18 | 6 | 9 | | | | | | | Ret | 11 | 15 | 296 |
| 16 | (United Kingdom) Marlo Cordell | 3 | 2 | Ret | Ret | 10 | Ret | 6 | Ret | Ret | Ret | | | | | | | | | | 141 |
Drivers ineligible for points
| - | (United Kingdom) Nick Tandy | | | | | | | | | | | | | | | | | 2 | 1 | 1 | - |
| - | (United Kingdom) Nathan Harrison | | | | | | | | | | | | | | | | | 4 | 4 | 5 | - |
| - | (United Kingdom) Steven Chandler | 10 | 4 | 6 | 11 | Ret | 10 | | | | | | | | | | | | | | - |
| - | (United Kingdom) Jenson O'Neill-Going | | | | | | | | | | | | | | 12 | Ret | 18 | 7 | 16 | 11 | - |
| - | (United Kingdom) Brent Bowie | | | | | | | | | 13 | 14 | Ret | 13 | 11 | 21 | Ret | Ret | 20 | 13 | 16 | - |
| - | (United Kingdom) Gerry Hendry | | | | | | | | | | | 12 | 12 | Ret | | | | | | | - |
| - | (United Kingdom) Alex Brandham | | | | | | | | | | | Ret | Ret | Ret | 16 | 13 | 12 | 16 | 21 | 21 | - |
| Pos. | Driver | DPN | | | SNE | | | OUL | | CRO | | KNO | | | SIL | | | BHGP | | | Pts |

==== JCW Rookie Cup ====
| Pos | Team | Pts |
|---|---|---|
| 1 | (United Kingdom) Max Edmundson | 630 |
| 2 | (United Kingdom) Charlie Hand | 522 |
| 3 | (United Kingdom) Harry Campey | 519 |
| 4 | (United Kingdom) Alex Solley | 472 |
| 5 | (United Kingdom) Cameron Richardson | 469 |
| 6 | (United Kingdom) Harry Hickton | 454 |
| 7 | (United Kingdom) Ned Anthony | 425 |
| 8 | (United Kingdom) Owen Hillman | 424 |
| 9 | (United Kingdom) Jacob Hodgkiss | 357 |
| 10 | (United Kingdom) Albert Webster | 296 |

==== JCW Sport Drivers' Championship ====
| Pos. | Driver | DPN | | | SNE | | | OUL | | CRO | | KNO | | | SIL | | | BHGP | | | Pts |
|---|---|---|---|---|---|---|---|---|---|---|---|---|---|---|---|---|---|---|---|---|---|
| 1 | (United Kingdom) Archie Johnson | Ret | 15 | 17 | 20 | 17 | 21 | 13 | 19 | 16 | 15 | 15 | 16 | 13 | 14 | 11 | 13 | 14 | 15 | 22 | 841 |
| 2 | (United Kingdom) Henry Howarth | 14 | 17 | 11 | 22 | 16 | 17 | 12 | 15 | 15 | Ret | 16 | 15 | 14 | 15 | 12 | 14 | 13 | 18 | 19 | 819 |
| 3 | (United Kingdom) Ben Crossley | 16 | 16 | 18 | 18 | 18 | 16 | 14 | Ret | 18 | 19 | 20 | 20 | 15 | 18 | 17 | 17 | 15 | 17 | 17 | 712 |
| 4 | (United Kingdom) Chris MacKenzie | Ret | 18 | 12 | 17 | Ret | 20 | 17 | 16 | 14 | 17 | 18 | 19 | 18 | 20 | 14 | 15 | 17 | 19 | 18 | 686 |
| 5 | (United Kingdom) Will Crooks | 17 | Ret | 13 | 21 | 20 | 19 | 21 | 17 | 19 | 18 | 19 | 18 | 17 | 19 | 16 | 16 | 19 | 20 | 20 | 632 |
| 6 | (Malta) Nicky Gauci | 15 | Ret | DNS | 19 | 19 | 18 | 15 | 14 | 17 | 16 | 21 | 17 | 16 | 17 | 15 | Ret | 18 | Ret | DNS | 552 |
| Pos. | Driver | DPN | | | SNE | | | OUL | | CRO | | KNO | | | SIL | | | BHGP | | | Pts |

==== JCW Sport Rookie Cup ====
| Pos | Team | Pts |
|---|---|---|
| 1 | (United Kingdom) Henry Howarth | 804 |
| 2 | (United Kingdom) Archie Johnson | 790 |
| 3 | (United Kingdom) Will Crooks | 636 |
| 4 | (Malta) Nicky Gauci | 549 |
