= Max Hall (racing driver) =

British racing driver (born 2007)

- Hall driving at Donington Park in 2026
- Nationality: (United Kingdom) British
- Born: Maximus Hall; 26 February 2007 (age 19) Dursley, Gloucestershire, England

TCR UK Touring Car Championship career
- Debut season: 2026
- Current team: Hall's Racing
- Car number: 93
- Former teams: BSR with Richmond Fire
- Starts: 16
- Wins: 2
- Podiums: 7
- Poles: 0
- Fastest laps: 5
- Best finish: 14th in 2025

Previous series
- 2025 2023–2024 2022 2021: British Touring Car Championship; Mini Challenge UK; Junior Saloon Car Championship; Ginetta Junior Championship

Championship titles
- 2022: Junior Saloon Car Championship

Maximus Hall (born 26 February 2007) is a British racing driver who competes in TCR UK Touring Car Championship for Hall’s Racing.

== Career ==
=== Karting ===
Hall had a successful karting career in the UK. He first gained notability in 2013 by winning the British Open Championship in the Bambino category. He returned to the national stage in 2018, competing in the IAME Cadet category. He had a best championship result of fifth in the Kartmasters British Grand Prix, competing against the likes of Freddie Slater and Arvid Lindblad. Hall then had another solid season in 2019, with top-ten finishes in the three national competitions he contested.

=== Early career ===
==== 2021 ====
At only thirteen years old at the time, Hall was announced to be stepping up to cars for the 2021 season, joining Elite Motorsport for the 2021 Ginetta Junior Championship. His spell in the series yielded a best result of 12th in a fairly unsuccessful campaign. He finished 23rd in the standings on 61 points.

==== 2022 ====
In 2022, Hall won the Citroen Saxo-based Junior Saloon Car title, winning ten races over the course of the 24 races, and scoring 18 podiums on his way to 584 points.

==== 2023 ====
Hall joined Excelr8 Motorsport for the final round of the 2023 Mini Challenge UK. He had a strong debut weekend in preparation for his first full season in 2024.

==== 2024 ====
After his successes in the Saloon Car Championship, Hall was confirmed to be continuing with Excelr8 Motorsport for the 2024 Vertu Mini Challenge UK. He had a very strong rookie year, securing six victories from the 19 races that were held on the support bill of the British Touring Car Championship. He finished second in the championship, only outscored by Dan Zelos.

=== British Touring Car Championship ===
==== 2025 ====
In November 2024, Un-Limited Motorsport confirmed that Hall would be joining the team for the 2025 British Touring Car Championship. Partnered by Dexter Patterson and Nicolas Hamilton, Hall would only pace between the two. On 4 July 2025, Hall announced he was leaving Un-Limited Motorsport with immediate effect.

== Karting record ==
Season	Series	Team	Position
2013	British Open Championship – Bambino		1st
2017	Super 1 National Championship – IAME Cadet		23rd
2018	Kartmasters British Grand Prix – IAME Cadet	PMR Driver Program	5th
2018	MSA British Kart Championship – IAME Cadet		6th
2019	Kartmasters British Grand Prix – IAME Cadet	PMR Driver Program	8th
2019	LGM Series – IAME Cadet		7th
2019	MSA British Kart Championship – IAME Cadet	PMR Driver Program	6th

== Racing record ==
=== Racing career summary ===
Season	Series	Team	Races	Wins	Poles	F/Laps	Podiums	Points	Position
2021	Ginetta Junior Championship	Elite Motorsport	25	0	0	0	0	61	23rd
2022	Junior Saloon Car Championship	Westbourne Motorsport	24	10	8	8	18	584	**1st**
2023	Mini Challenge UK – Trophy	Westbourne Motorsport	20	2	0	0	6	563	7th
2023	Mini Challenge UK – JCW	Excelr8 Motorsport	3	0	1	0	0	N/A	NC†
2024	Mini Challenge UK – JCW	Excelr8 Motorsport	19	6	1	1	10	679	**2nd**
2025	British Touring Car Championship	ROKiT Racing with Un-Limited Motorsport	13	0	0	0	0	7	23rd
2025	TCR UK Touring Car Championship	BSR with Richmond Fire	4	0	0	1	2	97	14th
2026	TCR UK Touring Car Championship	Hall's Racing	12	2	0	4	5	286	2nd*

=== Complete Ginetta Junior Championship results ===
(key) (Races in bold indicate pole position) (Races in italics indicate fastest lap)

Year	Team	1	2	3	4	5	6	7	8	9	10	11	12	13	14	15	16	17	18	19	20	21	22	23	24	25	26	DC	Points
2021	Elite Motorsport	THR; 1; 12	THR; 2; 13	SNE; 1; 17	SNE; 2; 14	SNE; 3; 15	BHI; 1; 21	BHI; 2; 17	BHI; 3; 22	OUL; 1; 20	OUL; 2 C	KNO; 1; 15	KNO; 2; 25	KNO; 3; 15	KNO; 4; 16	THR; 1 Ret	THR; 2; 13	THR; 3 Ret	SIL; 1; 16	SIL; 2; 20	SIL; 3; 21	DON; 1; 17	DON; 2; 19	DON; 3; 24	BHGP; 1; 22	BHGP; 2 Ret	BHGP; 3; 28	23rd	61

=== Complete British Touring Car Championship results ===
(key) (Races in bold indicate pole position – 1 point awarded just in first race; races in italics indicate fastest lap – 1 point awarded all races; * signifies that driver led race for at least one lap – 1 point given all races)

Year	Team	Car	1	2	3	4	5	6	7	8	9	10	11	12	13	14	15	16	17	18	19	20	21	22	23	24	25	26	27	28	29	30	DC	Points
2025	ROKiT Racing with Un-Limited Motorsport	Cupra León	DON; 1; 14	DON; 2; 13	DON; 3; 20	BRH; 1; 23	BRH; 2 Ret	BRH; 3 Ret	SNE; 1 Ret	SNE; 2; 21	SNE; 3; 14	THR; 1 Ret	THR; 2 DNS	THR; 3 DNS	OUL; 1 Ret	OUL; 2; 18	OUL; 3 Ret	CRO; 1	CRO; 2	CRO; 3	KNO; 1	KNO; 2	KNO; 3	DON; 1	DON; 2	DON; 3	SIL; 1	SIL; 2	SIL; 3	BRH; 1	BRH; 2	BRH; 3	23rd	7
