= EXCELR8 Motorsport =

British motor racing team

(United Kingdom) EXCELR8 Motorsport
- Founded: 2007
- Team principal(s): Antony Williams; Justina Williams
- Current series: BTCC; Mini Challenge UK
- Former series: Porsche Carrera Cup Great Britain
- Current drivers: British Touring Car Championship; 3. (United Kingdom) Tom Chilton; 28. (United Kingdom) Nicolas Hamilton; 80. (United Kingdom) Tom Ingram; 11. (United Kingdom) Ricky Collard; Mini Challenge UK; 1. (United Kingdom) Tom Ovenden; 13. (United Kingdom) Harry Campey; 21. (United Kingdom) Nathan Edwards; 26. (Turkey) Cemil Çıpa; 29. (United Kingdom) Will Crooks; 38. (Malta) Olivier Algieri; 94. (United Kingdom) Josh Porter; Mini Challenge Trophy; 14. (United Kingdom) Dominic Wheatley; 22. (United Kingdom) Ashley Gregory; 24. (United Kingdom) Jorrel Julius; 82. (United Kingdom) Adam Curtis
- Noted drivers: (United Kingdom) Chris Smiley (United Kingdom) Dan Zelos (United Kingdom) Senna Proctor (United Kingdom) Daniel Lloyd (United Kingdom) Ronan Pearson (United Kingdom) Rick Parfitt Jr (United Kingdom) Max Hall (United Kingdom) Adam Morgan (United Kingdom) Michael Crees
- Drivers' Championships: British Touring Car Championship; 2022 – (United Kingdom) Tom Ingram; 2025 – (United Kingdom) Tom Ingram; Mini Challenge UK – Cooper; 2011 – (United Kingdom) Ant Whorton-Eales; 2012 – (United Kingdom) Lewis Gilbert; 2016 – (United Kingdom) Max Bladon; 2017 – (United Kingdom) Matt Hammond; 2023 – (United Kingdom) Tom Ovenden; Mini Challenge UK – JCW; 2010 – (United Kingdom) Luke Caudle; 2011 – (United Kingdom) Chris Knox; 2014 – (United Kingdom) Chris Knox; 2020 – (United Kingdom) Nathan Harrison; 2021 – (United Kingdom) Dan Zelos; 2023 – (United Kingdom) Dan Zelos; 2024 – (United Kingdom) Dan Zelos; 2025 – (United Kingdom) Tom Ovenden; 2026 – (United Kingdom) Tom Ovenden

EXCELR8 Motorsport is a British racing team that is headed by former racing driver Justina Williams, and is currently competing in both the Mini Challenge and British Touring Car Championship, the latter in collaboration with Vertu Motors.

== BTCC History ==
The team joined the BTCC in 2019, using MG6 GT cars previously operated by Triple Eight and AmD Tuning. The cars were driven by Rob Smith and Sam Osborne. During the first year, the team secured two points-scoring finishes.

In 2020, the team replaced the ageing MG with brand new Hyundai i30 Fastback N Performance cars that it had developed in house during the winter. Senna Proctor and Chris Smiley would share driving duties and both secured podium finishes, despite the COVID-19 pandemic restricting the amount of testing that was possible with the new car.

For 2021, EXCELR8 joined forces with Trade Price Cars to enter four Hyundais under the name Excelr8 with TradePriceCars.com, retaining the services of Chris Smiley, and taking on Tom Ingram, Jack Butel, and Rick Parfitt Jr. Nick Halstead replaced Rick Parfitt Jr. for the Croft round of 2021 after Parfitt suffered a back injury. Halstead placed 26th, 25th and 21st in the 3 races at Croft. Jack Butel suffered a concussion from a crash in Race 3 at the Donington event which saw him sit out of the season finale at Brands Hatch, Andy Wilmot replaced Butel after last racing in the BTCC in 2015.

Tom Ingram and Jack Butel were retained for the 2022 season, with Tom Chilton and Daniel Lloyd joining from Ciceley Motorsport and Power Maxed Racing respectively. Ingram won race 1 at Donington Park to take an early lead in the championship. Ingram won races 1 and 2 at Oulton Park whilst Daniel Lloyd won races 1 and 2 at Croft. James Gornall replaced Butel for the aformentioned Croft round due to personal reasons. The Mini Challenge UK driver scored 2 points in race 1 with a P14, he followed with a DNF and a P17. Ingram scored a hat-trick of 3rd places at Snetterton whilst Chilton retired from race 1 and didn't start races 2 and 3. Jack Butel finally scored his first points of 2022 with a P15 finish in race 3 at Round 8. Ingram would win race 3 at Silverstone and races 1 and 2 at Brands Hatch, winning 3 races in a row before securing his first BTCC title. The team managed to secure a P2 in the Teams' standings, beating their previous best of P5 in 2021.

Ronan Pearson joined the team and Nick Halstead returned for 2023 to partner Tom Chilton and reigning champion Tom Ingram. The Excelr8 team scored a podium in every race of Round 1 at Donington Park, with Ingram scoring a P3 in race 1 and a P2 in race 3, whilst Tom Chilton took his first win in the Hyundai and Nick Halstead took a career-best P7 finish in the tricky conditions of race 2. Ronan Pearson originally scored a P3 finish in the chaotic Donington race but was later disqualified after failing the ride height check. Ingram picked up more podiums in Brands Hatch before he took his first win of 2023 in race 3 at Snetterton. A dip in performance for the team through Thruxton, Oulton Park and Croft saw Pearson score 1 point and Ingram only score 5 podium finishes in the intense title fight with 3 time champion Ashley Sutton. Tom Ingram would finally return to the top step in Race 2 at the Donington GP round, but he only gained 3 points on Sutton with the NAPA driver finishing in P2. Ingram scored three 2nd places in a row at rounds 27, 28 and 29 but would be too late as Sutton took the title away from Ingram. Once again, Excelr8 would find themselves P2 in the Teams' standings behind a dominant NAPA Racing UK.

For 2024, no driver or car changes were made. Only a slight tweak to the team name was made going under the Team Bristol Street Motors moniker. Ingram won the first 2 races at Donington, following with a P4 in the reverse grid race. Ronan Pearson claimed his first BTCC win in the reverse grid race at Brands Hatch ahead of teammate Tom Chilton. Ingram secured 2 P3 finishes at Thruxton after not scoring a podium since Brands Hatch race 2. A win at Oulton Park would bring him back into the title fight with Ashley Sutton and Jake Hill. Tom Chilton was the only Excelr8 driver to win at Croft. A winless weekend at Croft for the championship favourite Tom Ingram would see Hill pull away in the title bid. 2, soon to be 3, time Mini Challenge UK champion Dan Zelos debuted in the place of Ronan Pearson after he and the team parted ways. A relatively quiet Donington Park GP round saw an eventful wet Silverstone weekend where Ingram won races 1 and 3 whilst title rival Colin Turkington retired from race 3 after beaching his BMW at Maggotts. Dan Zelos took his maiden JST win in race 3 after a great drive through the field. Tom Ingram narrowly missed out on a 2nd Drivers' championship after a close fight with the WSR driver of Jake Hill. For the 3rd consecutive season, Excelr8 finished behind NAPA Racing UK in the Teams' championship.

The team only retained Tom Ingram, Tom Chilton and the Hyundai i30 for 2025, with the team rebranded to Team VERTU, A rebrand of car sales company Bristol Street Motors to VERTU Motors. Former Team BMW driver Adam Morgan returned to FWD machinery, with Michael Crees and a returning Senna Proctor sharing the 4th Excelr8 car, swapping after 5 rounds. Tom Ingram secured a hat-trick of 2nd place finishes at Round 1 in Donington, with Tom Chilton securing Team VERTU's first win under the new name. The team would endure a winless Brands Hatch as WSR took all 3 wins with 3 of their drivers. Michael Crees was replaced by long time business friend Ryan Bensley for Snetterton in the Miller Oils camo Hyundai. Ingram would make a rare mistake coming through Riches in race 2 which would see him down at the back for race 3, he recovered to P4 come the chequered flag. A misunderstanding of the driver swap limit rule saw Senna Proctor's return come forward to round 4 at Thruxton, with Crees being dropped for the remainder of the season. Tom Ingram took his first win of 2025 in race 1 at Thruxton, with 2 P2 finishes following. Proctor managed a P9, P6 and P4 on his first BTCC weekend since the 2021 season. 1 win at Oulton Park for Tom Ingram saw him begin to seriously reel in Ashley Sutton for the title. All 4 Team VERTU cars scored every race of Croft bar Proctor's race 2. Ingram won race 1 of Croft with Proctor taking his first podium since his return. Tom Chilton would take a P2 in race 2 with Ingram and Proctor taking P2 and P3 in the reverse grid race. Knockhill saw Ingram take 1 win and a P3 after Proctor let Ingram by for the podium. The Donington Park GP round was Tom Chilton's first pole since Knockhill 2011, with him converting it into a race 1 win. Ingram won race 3 at Donington and followed it up with a race 2 win at Silverstone. Adam Morgan and Tom Chilton were the 2 Team VERTU cars who retired due to the bonnet flying up and a puncture respectively. Chilton would secure a P2 in race 1 of Brands Hatch, followed by 2 retirements. Tom Ingram would win race 2 to become the 2025 BTCC champion, and a two time champion, equalling the likes of Jason Plato and Fabrizio Giovanardi. By 2 points, Team VERTU would lose out to NAPA Racing UK in the Teams' championship.

For 2026, Team VERTU ran experienced drivers Tom Ingram and Tom Chilton once again, with a new pool of drivers alongside them after Adam Morgan joined the new Cataclean Plato Racing, run by Jason Plato, he was replaced in the Draper Tools car by Nicolas Hamilton. Senna Proctor joined NAPA Racing UK as a reserve driver and driver coach and was replaced by British GT champion Ricky Collard who returned after 2 seasons away. Collard would later be replaced by Japanese driver Osamu Kawashima for the last 2 events.

== Mini Challenge UK ==
The team also competes in the Mini Challenge with eight drivers in the JCW category and seven drivers in the Trophy category, they remain the most successful team to date in the Mini Challenge UK series.

The team has successfully competed in the MINI CHALLENGE since 2010 racking up multiple championships in both the Cooper and JCW classes, with the likes of Nathan Harrison in 2021, triple JCW champion Dan Zelos in 2019, 2020 and 2024, Matt Hammond and Tom Ovenden in 2022 and 2025.

Since 2019, the team has only failed to win the 2023 season.

== Racing results ==
=== British Touring Car Championship ===
Year	Name	Car	No.	Driver	Races	Wins	Poles	F/Laps	Podiums	Points	DC	CC Pts	CC
2019	Excelr8 Motorsport	MG6 GT	4	(United Kingdom) Sam Osborne	30	0	0	0	0	2	31st	4	19th
2019	Excelr8 Motorsport	MG6 GT	37	(United Kingdom) Rob Smith	29	0	0	0	0	2	30th	4	19th
2020	Excelr8 Motorsport	Hyundai i30 Fastback N Performance	18	(United Kingdom) Senna Proctor	26	0	0	0	1	141	13th	246	7th
2020	Excelr8 Motorsport	Hyundai i30 Fastback N Performance	22	(United Kingdom) Chris Smiley	27	0	0	0	1	106	14th	246	7th
2021	Ginsters Excelr8 with TradePriceCars.com	Hyundai i30 Fastback N Performance	22	(United Kingdom) Chris Smiley	30	0	0	0	0	138	15th	445	5th
2021	Ginsters Excelr8 with TradePriceCars.com	Hyundai i30 Fastback N Performance	80	(United Kingdom) Tom Ingram	30	3	0	2	9	300	4th	445	5th
2021	Excelr8 with TradePriceCars.com	Hyundai i30 Fastback N Performance	42	(United Kingdom) Nick Halstead	3	0	0	0	0	0	34th	12	13th
2021	Excelr8 with TradePriceCars.com	Hyundai i30 Fastback N Performance	55	(United Kingdom) Andy Wilmot	3	0	0	0	0	0	32nd	12	13th
2021	Excelr8 with TradePriceCars.com	Hyundai i30 Fastback N Performance	62	(United Kingdom) Rick Parfitt Jr.	27	0	0	0	0	0	27th	12	13th
2021	Excelr8 with TradePriceCars.com	Hyundai i30 Fastback N Performance	96	(United Kingdom) Jack Butel	27	0	0	0	0	4	25th	12	13th
2022	Bristol Street Motors with Excelr8 TradePriceCars.com	Hyundai i30 Fastback N Performance	3	(United Kingdom) Tom Chilton	28	0	0	0	0	83	15th	497	3rd
2022	Bristol Street Motors with Excelr8 TradePriceCars.com	Hyundai i30 Fastback N Performance	18	(United Kingdom) James Gornall	3	0	0	0	0	2	24th	497	3rd
2022	Bristol Street Motors with Excelr8 TradePriceCars.com	Hyundai i30 Fastback N Performance	80	(United Kingdom) Tom Ingram	30	6	2	8	12	394	1st	497	3rd
2022	Bristol Street Motors with Excelr8 TradePriceCars.com	Hyundai i30 Fastback N Performance	96	(United Kingdom) Jack Butel	26	0	0	0	0	1	27th	497	3rd
2022	Bristol Street Motors with Excelr8 TradePriceCars.com	Hyundai i30 Fastback N Performance	123	(United Kingdom) Daniel Lloyd	30	3	0	1	3	192	10th	497	3rd
2023	Bristol Street Motors with EXCELR8	Hyundai i30 Fastback N Performance	1	(United Kingdom) Tom Ingram	30	2	0	5	17	400	2nd	564	2nd
2023	Bristol Street Motors with EXCELR8	Hyundai i30 Fastback N Performance	3	(United Kingdom) Tom Chilton	30	1	0	0	1	97	14th	564	2nd
2023	Bristol Street Motors with EXCELR8	Hyundai i30 Fastback N Performance	14	(United Kingdom) Ronan Pearson	30	0	0	1	0	69	18th	564	2nd
2023	Bristol Street Motors with EXCELR8	Hyundai i30 Fastback N Performance	22	(United Kingdom) Nick Halstead	30	0	0	0	0	-5	30th	564	2nd
2024	Team Bristol Street Motors	Hyundai i30 Fastback N Performance	3	(United Kingdom) Tom Chilton	30	1	0	0	3	187	10th	609	2nd
2024	Team Bristol Street Motors	Hyundai i30 Fastback N Performance	14	(United Kingdom) Ronan Pearson	21	1	0	1	1	77	16th	609	2nd
2024	Team Bristol Street Motors	Hyundai i30 Fastback N Performance	22	(United Kingdom) Nick Halstead	28	0	0	0	0	7	22nd	609	2nd
2024	Team Bristol Street Motors	Hyundai i30 Fastback N Performance	45	(United Kingdom) Dan Zelos	9	0	0	0	0	44	19th	609	2nd
2024	Team Bristol Street Motors	Hyundai i30 Fastback N Performance	80	(United Kingdom) Tom Ingram	30	6	4	10	15	413	2nd	609	2nd
2025	Team VERTU	Hyundai i30 Fastback N Performance	3	(United Kingdom) Tom Chilton	30	2	1	3	6	230	7th	773	2nd
2025	Team VERTU	Hyundai i30 Fastback N Performance	18	(United Kingdom) Senna Proctor	21	0	0	0	3	167	10th	773	2nd
2025	Team VERTU	Hyundai i30 Fastback N Performance	33	(United Kingdom) Adam Morgan	30	0	0	1	5	241	6th	773	2nd
2025	Team VERTU	Hyundai i30 Fastback N Performance	54	(United Kingdom) Ryan Bensley	3	0	0	0	0	0	29th	773	2nd
2025	Team VERTU	Hyundai i30 Fastback N Performance	80	(United Kingdom) Tom Ingram	30	7	2	9	18	462	1st	773	2nd
2025	Team VERTU	Hyundai i30 Fastback N Performance	777	(United Kingdom) Michael Crees	6	0	0	0	0	5	25th	773	2nd
2026	Team VERTU	Hyundai i30 Fastback N Performance	3	(United Kingdom) Tom Chilton									
2026	Team VERTU	Hyundai i30 Fastback N Performance	11	(United Kingdom) Ricky Collard									
2026	Team VERTU	Hyundai i30 Fastback N Performance	28	(United Kingdom) Nicolas Hamilton									
2026	Team VERTU	Hyundai i30 Fastback N Performance	80	(United Kingdom) Tom Ingram									
2026	Team VERTU	Hyundai i30 Fastback N Performance	81	(Japan) Osamu Kawashima									
