= Lewis Selby =

British racing driver (born 1980)

- Selby driving for Alliance Racing at Silverstone in 2026
- Nationality: (United Kingdom) British
- Born: 18 July 1980 (age 46) Aylesbury, England

British Touring Car Championship career
- Debut season: 2026
- Current team: NAPA Racing UK
- Starts: 30
- Wins: 0
- Podiums: 0
- Poles: 0
- Fastest laps: 0
- Best finish: 19th in 2026

Previous series
- 2023–2025 2005, 2018, 2021–22 2003–04, 2016–17: Mini Challenge UK; Mini Miglia Challenge; Mini Se7en Challenge

Lewis Selby (born 18 July 1980) is a British racing driver and managing director who currently competes in the British Touring Car Championship for NAPA Racing UK. He is the managing director for NAPA Auto Parts UK.

Selby first appeared in NAPA colours in the Mini Miglia Championship before driving at the 2022 Goodwood Festival of Speed.

== Career ==
=== Car racing debut (2003–2005) ===
Selby would debut in cars in 2003, competing in the Mini Se7en Challenge. That year, the likes of Nick Tandy and Joe Tandy were competing against him. He would finish 12th. Selby would compete in the series in 2004 as well recording two wins but finishing 10th overall due to many DNF’s.

Selby moved to another Mini racing series for 2005, this time the Mini Miglia Challenge, but only appeared twice citing budget restraints.

=== Initial return to racing (2015–2018) ===
After 10 years outside of racing, 2015 saw him return to the Mini Se7en Challenge, where he placed 15th in the standingshaving only competed in a few rounds. Staying in the series for 2 more seasons, Selby placed 3rd in 2016 and then followed it with a 2017 placement of 2nd.

=== Mini Challenge debut (2023) ===
Selby returned to racing after a 4 year absence, and moved to the spotlight for 2022, with well-known brands NAPA and Motorbase Performance running his car in the Mini Challenge UK. Selby only stood on the podium twice, being 2 Directors' Cup wins at Brands Hatch and Knockhill. The year saw him place P11 in the standings.

In 2024, Selby returned in the Mini Challenge UK, at the newly rebranded Alliance Racing. Selby won the final race of the Donington Park weekend, but failed to finish P1 for the rest of the season, only leading 21 laps throughout. Despite this, the year saw him rise to P7 in the standings.

For 2025, Selby was once again at the Alliance Racing fold, partnered by Jamie Osborne, Alex Solley and Cameron Richardson. In the end, Selby came third in the standings, scoring 1win, being Race 2 at Oulton Park and 11 podiums. Former Mini Seven rival and friend Nick Tandy joined Selby for Brands Hatch due to ill health for Jamie Osborne.

=== British Touring Car Championship debut (2026) ===
For 2026, Selby entered the British Touring Car Championship with NAPA Racing UK.

== Racing record ==
Season	Series	Team	Races	Wins	Poles	F/Laps	Podiums	Points	Position
2003	Mini Se7en Challenge	Privateer	8	0	0	0	1	81	12th
2004	Mini Se7en Challenge	Privateer	9	2	1	1	4	82	10th
2005	Mini Miglia Challenge	Privateer	1	0	0	0	0	1	30th
2015	Mini Se7en Challenge	Privateer	8	0	0	0	1	?	?
2016	Mini Se7en Challenge	Privateer	12	2	0	2	7	?	**3rd**
2017	Mini Se7en Challenge	Privateer	12	4	1	2	8	201	**2nd**
2022	Mini Miglia Challenge	Privateer	10	0	0	0	0	29	16th
2023	Mini Challenge UK – JCW	NAPA Racing UK	20	0	0	0	0	456	11th
2024	Mini Challenge UK – JCW	NAPA Racing UK	19	1	0	1	5	584	7th
2025	Mini Challenge UK – JCW	NAPA Racing UK	29	2	0	2	11	622	**3rd**
2026	British Touring Car Championship	NAPA Racing UK	30	0	0	0	0	46	19th

^{*} Season still in progress.

=== Complete British Touring Car Championship results ===
Key
Races in bold indicate pole position (1 point awarded – 2002–2003 all races, 2004–present just in first race)
Races in italics indicate fastest lap (1 point awarded all races)
* signifies that driver lead race for at least one lap (1 point awarded – 2002 just in feature races, 2003–present all races; ^{Superscript} number indicates points-scoring qualifying race position)
^{*} Season still in progress.

Year	Team	Car	1	2	3	4	5	6	7	8	9	10	11	12	13	14	15	16	17	18	19	20	21	22	23	24	25	26	27	28	29	30	DC	Points
2026	NAPA Racing UK	Ford Focus Titanium Saloon	DON; 1; 15	DON; 2; 15	DON; 3; 17	BRH; 1; 16^{12}	BRH; 2 Ret	BRH; 3; 15	SNE; 1; 12	SNE; 2; 11	SNE; 3; 20	OUL; 1 Ret^{14}	OUL; 2; 14	OUL; 3 Ret	THR; 1; 18	THR; 2; 18	THR; 3 Ret	KNO; 1; 14	KNO; 2; 11	KNO; 3; 13	DON; 1; 13	DON; 2; 17	DON; 3; 12	CRO; 1; 17^{14}	CRO; 2; 17	CRO; 3; 14	SIL; 1; 15^{13}	SIL; 2; 13	SIL; 3; 21	BRH; 1; 16	BRH; 2; 13	BRH; 3 Ret	19th*	43*
