= 2018 Mini Challenge UK =

Motor racing competition

The 2018 Mini Challenge season was the seventeenth season of the Mini Challenge UK. The season started on 31 March at Oulton Park and ended on 29 September at Rockingham Motor Speedway. The season featured thirteen rounds across the UK.

== Calendar ==
Round	Circuit	Date	Classes	Races
1	Oulton Park International	31 March, 2 April	JCW	2
2	Donington Park National	14 April	Open, Cooper Pro, Cooper Am	2
3	Rockingham ISSC	28–29 April	JCW	2
4	Snetterton 300	12–13 May	Open, Cooper Pro, Cooper Am	3
5	Snetterton 300	26–27 May	JCW	2
6	Silverstone GP	9–10 June	JCW	2
7	Silverstone National	23 June	Open, Cooper Pro, Cooper Am	2
8	Oulton Park Island	21 July	All	2
9	Brands Hatch GP	11–12 August	JCW	2
10	Brands Hatch Indy	25–26 August	All	3
11	Cadwell Park	15 September	Open, Cooper Pro, Cooper Am	2
12	Donington Park GP	22–23 September	JCW	2
13	Rockingham ISSC	29 September	Open, Cooper Pro, Cooper Am	3

== Entry list ==
Team	No.	Driver	Rounds
JCW Class
Lawrence Davey Racing	0	(United Kingdom) Lawrence Davey	1–5
Lawrence Davey Racing	100	(United Kingdom) Lawrence Davey	6–8
Lawrence Davey Racing	666	(United Kingdom) Luke Caudle	7–8
Excelr8 Motorsport	3	(United Kingdom) Ollie Pidgley	1–5
Excelr8 Motorsport	3	(United Kingdom) Jono Davis	6, 8
Excelr8 Motorsport	3	(United Kingdom) James Mckintyre	7
Excelr8 Motorsport	8	(United Kingdom) Sam Weller	6
Excelr8 Motorsport	11	(United Kingdom) Sam Weller	8
Excelr8 Motorsport	27	(United Kingdom) Nathan Harrison	All
Excelr8 Motorsport	46	(United Kingdom) Stuart Gibbs	All
Excelr8 Motorsport	87	(United Kingdom) Paul Bell	1–2
Excelr8 Motorsport	96	(United Kingdom) Taelor Shand	All
Excelr8 Motorsport	116	(United Kingdom) David Robinson	1–6
Excelr8 Motorsport	117	(United Kingdom) Jac Maybin	All
Excelr8 Motorsport	126	(United Kingdom) Luke Reade	All
MINI UK VIP	5	(United Kingdom) Alex Morgan	6
MINI UK VIP	19	(United Kingdom) Jordan Collard	All
MINI UK VIP	37	(United Kingdom) Rob Smith	All
MINI UK VIP	52	(United Kingdom) Paul O'Neill	1
MINI UK VIP	52	(United Kingdom) James Gornall	2
MINI UK VIP	52	(United Kingdom) Will Beaumont	3
MINI UK VIP	52	(United Kingdom) David Green	4
MINI UK VIP	52	(United Kingdom) Rob Collard	5
MINI UK VIP	52	(United Kingdom) James Mills	6
MINI UK VIP	130	(United Kingdom) Henry Lee	2
MINI UK VIP	130	(United Kingdom) Sam Weller	3
MINI UK VIP	130	(United Kingdom) Paul O'Neill	5
MINI UK VIP	130	(United Kingdom) Ben Palmer	8
MINI UK VIP	345	(United Kingdom) Dan Zelos	7
ES Motorsport	7	(United Kingdom) Steve King	All
JamSport Racing	10	(United Kingdom) Ant Whorton-Eales	All
JamSport Racing	21	(United Kingdom) Jack Davidson	All
JamSport Racing	24	(United Kingdom) Joe Tanner	1, 5
JamSport Racing	45	(United Kingdom) Calum King	All
JamSport Racing	146	(United Kingdom) Jamie Going	2, 7
JamSport Racing	777	(United Kingdom) Louis Doyle	2–4
Team Dynamics	12	(United Kingdom) Rory Cuff	All
Team Dynamics	22	(United Kingdom) Will Neal	All
Team Dynamics	42	(United Kingdom) Henry Neal	All
Team Dynamics	130	(United Kingdom) Matt Neal	1
Newsham Racing	16	(United Kingdom) Callum Newsham	All
Newsham Racing	130	(United Kingdom) Dave Newsham	4
Privateer	17	(United Kingdom) Brad Hutchison	All
Privateer	18	(United Kingdom) James Gornall	6, 8
OX4 Racing	35	(United Kingdom) James Loukes	1–2, 4, 7
OX4 Racing	35	(United Kingdom) Chris Oakman	3, 5, 8
AReeve Motorsport	39	(United Kingdom) Lewis Brown	All
AReeve Motorsport	77	(United Kingdom) Ben Dimmack	1–2
Scott Jeffs Racing / MJ Tech	69	(United Kingdom) Jake de Haan	All
Scott Jeffs Racing / MJ Tech	84	(United Kingdom) Ryan Dignan	All
Scott Jeffs Racing / MJ Tech	90	(United Kingdom) Scott Jeffs	All
Privateer	444	(United Kingdom) George Sutton	1–5, 8
Open Class
Privateer	5	(United Kingdom) Chloe Hewitt	All
Privateer	14	(United Kingdom) Dan Butcher-Lloyd	6–7
Privateer	666	(United Kingdom) Sami Bowler	All
Excelr8 Motorsport	8	(United Kingdom) Kevin Owen	All
Excelr8 Motorsport	21	(United Kingdom) Jono Davis	All
Mad4Mini Motorsport	12	(United Kingdom) Stuart McLaren	4–7
Mad4Mini Motorsport	44	(United Kingdom) Andy Montgomery	All
Mad4Mini Motorsport	444	(United Kingdom) Neil Ginley	1
AReeve Motorsport	24	(United Kingdom) Rob Austin	All
AReeve Motorsport	30	(United Kingdom) Will Fairclough	All
AReeve Motorsport	33	(United Kingdom) Stu Lane	1–2
AReeve Motorsport	86	(United Kingdom) Pete Jonkinon	7
AReeve Motorsport	88	(United Kingdom) Tom Halliwell	4–5, 7
AReeve Motorsport	90	(United Kingdom) Alan Lee	All
AReeve Motorsport	606	(United Kingdom) Tim Bill	1–2
College of West Anglia	53	(United Kingdom) Neil Brown	1, 3, 5
College of West Anglia	53	(United Kingdom) Andy Langley	2, 6–7
Cooper Pro Class
Excelr8 Motorsport	1	(United Kingdom) Matt Hammond	7
Excelr8 Motorsport	7	(United Kingdom) Charlie Cooper	1–3, 5–7
Excelr8 Motorsport	19	(Australia) Jacob Andrews	All
Excelr8 Motorsport	36	(United Kingdom) Mark Cornell	All
Excelr8 Motorsport	41	(United Kingdom) Rory Cuff	1
Excelr8 Motorsport	56	(United Kingdom) Richard Newman	All
Excelr8 Motorsport	85	(United Kingdom) Toby Goodman	All
Privateer	6	(United Kingdom) Oliver O'Neill	1–2
Privateer	20	(United Kingdom) Kyle Reid	All
Privateer	31	(United Kingdom) Andy Jordon	3–4
Privateer	49	(United Kingdom) Martin Poole	1, 4
Privateer	82	(United Kingdom) Lydia Walmsley	All
Privateer	91	(United Kingdom) Robert Dalgleish	All
Rob Sims Racing	9	(United Kingdom) Simon Walton	1–3, 5–7
Rob Sims Racing	47	(United Kingdom) James Goodall	1–3, 5–7
AReeve Motorsport	12	(United Kingdom) Stuart McLaren	1–3
Sussex Road and Race	23	(United Kingdom) Ethan Pitt	1–3
MINI UK VIP	52	(South Africa) Emma Walsh	5
Cooper Am Class
AReeve Motorsport	4	(United Kingdom) Keir McConomy	All
AReeve Motorsport	46	(United Kingdom) Andy Godfrey	All
Privateer	16	(United Kingdom) Alex Nevill	All
Privateer	23	(United Kingdom) Lee Pearce	5–7
Sussex Road and Race	22	(United Kingdom) Elspeth Rodgers	1-4
College of West Anglia	50	(United Kingdom) Neal Clarke	All
College of West Anglia	51	(United Kingdom) Gary Papworth	All
College of West Anglia	54	(United Kingdom) Adrian Norman	All
Mad4Mini Motorsport	63	(United Kingdom) Darryl Brown	1–3, 5–7
Rob Sims Racing	888	(United Kingdom) Wai Kong Yau	1

== Results ==
=== JCW Class ===
Round		Circuit	Pole position	Fastest lap	Winning driver	Winning team
1	1	Oulton Park International	(United Kingdom) Jordan Collard	(United Kingdom) Ant Whorton-Eales	(United Kingdom) Ant Whorton-Eales	JamSport Racing
1	2	Oulton Park International	Race cancelled due to heavy rain			
2	3	Rockingham ISSC	(United Kingdom) Ant Whorton-Eales	(United Kingdom) Jordan Collard	(United Kingdom) Ant Whorton-Eales	JamSport Racing
2	4	Rockingham ISSC		(United Kingdom) Nathan Harrison	(United Kingdom) Ant Whorton-Eales	JamSport Racing
3	5	Snetterton 300	(United Kingdom) Nathan Harrison	(United Kingdom) Nathan Harrison	(United Kingdom) Nathan Harrison	Excelr8 Motorsport
3	6	Snetterton 300		(United Kingdom) Jordan Collard	(United Kingdom) David Robinson	Excelr8 Motorsport
4	7	Silverstone GP	(United Kingdom) Jordan Collard	(United Kingdom) Jordan Collard	(United Kingdom) Jordan Collard	MINI UK VIP
4	8	Silverstone GP		(United Kingdom) Jordan Collard	(United Kingdom) Rob Smith	MINI UK VIP
5	9	Oulton Park Island	(United Kingdom) Rob Smith	(United Kingdom) Jordan Collard	(United Kingdom) Rob Smith	MINI UK VIP
5	10	Oulton Park Island		(United Kingdom) Rob Smith	(United Kingdom) Ant Whorton-Eales	JamSport Racing
6	11	Brands Hatch GP	(United Kingdom) David Robinson	(United Kingdom) Ant Whorton-Eales	(United Kingdom) Ant Whorton-Eales	JamSport Racing
6	12	Brands Hatch GP		(United Kingdom) David Robinson	(United Kingdom) Ant Whorton-Eales	JamSport Racing
7	13	Brands Hatch Indy	(United Kingdom) Jordan Collard	(United Kingdom) Henry Neal	(United Kingdom) Ant Whorton-Eales	JamSport Racing
7	14	Brands Hatch Indy		(United Kingdom) Jordan Collard	(United Kingdom) Ant Whorton-Eales	JamSport Racing
7	15	Brands Hatch Indy		(United Kingdom) Ant Whorton-Eales	(United Kingdom) Ant Whorton-Eales	JamSport Racing
8	16	Donington Park GP	(United Kingdom) Ben Palmer	(United Kingdom) Nathan Harrison	(United Kingdom) Ant Whorton-Eales	JamSport Racing
8	17	Donington Park GP		(United Kingdom) Jordan Collard	(United Kingdom) Nathan Harrison	Excelr8 Motorsport

=== Open Class ===
Round		Circuit	Pole position	Fastest lap	Winning driver	Winning team
1	1	Donington Park National	(United Kingdom) Jono Davis	(United Kingdom) Will Fairclough	(United Kingdom) Will Fairclough	AReeve Motorsport
1	2	Donington Park National		(United Kingdom) Kevin Owen	(United Kingdom) Rob Austin	AReeve Motorsport
2	3	Snetterton 300	(United Kingdom) Andy Langley	(United Kingdom) Andy Langley	(United Kingdom) Andy Langley	College of West Anglia
2	4	Snetterton 300		(United Kingdom) Andy Langley	(United Kingdom) Jono Davis	Excelr8 Motorsport
2	5	Snetterton 300		(United Kingdom) Andy Langley	(United Kingdom) Rob Austin	AReeve Motorsport
3	6	Silverstone National	(United Kingdom) Jono Davis	(United Kingdom) Will Fairclough	(United Kingdom) Will Fairclough	AReeve Motorsport
3	7	Silverstone National		(United Kingdom) Jono Davis	(United Kingdom) Jono Davis	Excelr8 Motorsport
4	8	Oulton Park Island	(United Kingdom) Will Fairclough	(United Kingdom) Tom Halliwell	(United Kingdom) Will Fairclough	AReeve Motorsport
4	9	Oulton Park Island		(United Kingdom) Jono Davis	(United Kingdom) Tom Halliwell	AReeve Motorsport
5	10	Brands Hatch Indy	(United Kingdom) Will Fairclough	(United Kingdom) Will Fairclough	(United Kingdom) Will Fairclough	AReeve Motorsport
5	11	Brands Hatch Indy		(United Kingdom) Jono Davis	(United Kingdom) Will Fairclough	AReeve Motorsport
5	12	Brands Hatch Indy		(United Kingdom) Jono Davis	(United Kingdom) Jono Davis	Excelr8 Motorsport
6	13	Cadwell Park	(United Kingdom) Dan Butcher-Lloyd	(United Kingdom) Jono Davis	(United Kingdom) Jono Davis	Excelr8 Motorsport
6	14	Cadwell Park		(United Kingdom) Will Fairclough	(United Kingdom) Jono Davis	Excelr8 Motorsport
7	15	Rockingham ISSC	(United Kingdom) Jono Davis	(United Kingdom) Jono Davis	(United Kingdom) Jono Davis	Excelr8 Motorsport
7	16	Rockingham ISSC		(United Kingdom) Jono Davis	(United Kingdom) Jono Davis	Excelr8 Motorsport
7	17	Rockingham ISSC		(United Kingdom) Jono Davis	(United Kingdom) Jono Davis	Excelr8 Motorsport

=== Cooper Pro Class ===
Round		Circuit	Pole position	Fastest lap	Winning driver	Winning team
1	1	Donington Park National	(United Kingdom) Kyle Reid	(United Kingdom) Kyle Reid	(United Kingdom) Kyle Reid	Privateer
1	2	Donington Park National		(United Kingdom) Simon Walton	(United Kingdom) Kyle Reid	Privateer
2	3	Snetterton 300	(United Kingdom) Simon Walton	(United Kingdom) Kyle Reid	(United Kingdom) Kyle Reid	Privateer
2	4	Snetterton 300		(United Kingdom) Robert Dalgleish	(United Kingdom) Kyle Reid	Privateer
2	5	Snetterton 300		(United Kingdom) Kyle Reid	(United Kingdom) Kyle Reid	Privateer
3	6	Silverstone National	(United Kingdom) Kyle Reid	(United Kingdom) Robert Dalgleish	(United Kingdom) Kyle Reid	Privateer
3	7	Silverstone National		(United Kingdom) Kyle Reid	(United Kingdom) Robert Dalgleish	Privateer
4	8	Oulton Park Island	(United Kingdom) Martin Poole	(United Kingdom) Martin Poole	(United Kingdom) Robert Dalgleish	Privateer
4	9	Oulton Park Island		(United Kingdom) Robert Dalgleish	(United Kingdom) Kyle Reid	Privateer
5	10	Brands Hatch Indy	(United Kingdom) Toby Goodman	(United Kingdom) Robert Dalgleish	(United Kingdom) Kyle Reid	Privateer
5	11	Brands Hatch Indy		(United Kingdom) Mark Cornell	(United Kingdom) Kyle Reid	Privateer
5	12	Brands Hatch Indy		(United Kingdom) Kyle Reid	(United Kingdom) Kyle Reid	Privateer
6	13	Cadwell Park	(United Kingdom) Richard Newman	(United Kingdom) Simon Walton	(United Kingdom) Kyle Reid	Privateer
6	14	Cadwell Park		(United Kingdom) Toby Goodman	(United Kingdom) Robert Dalgleish	Privateer
7	15	Rockingham ISSC	(United Kingdom) Toby Goodman	(United Kingdom) Simon Walton	(United Kingdom) Toby Goodman	Excelr8 Motorsport
7	16	Rockingham ISSC		(United Kingdom) Kyle Reid	(United Kingdom) Kyle Reid	Privateer
7	17	Rockingham ISSC		(United Kingdom) Toby Goodman	(United Kingdom) Simon Walton	Rob Sims Racing

=== Cooper Am Class ===
Round		Circuit	Pole position	Fastest lap	Winning driver	Winning team
1	1	Donington Park National	(United Kingdom) Alex Nevill	(United Kingdom) Alex Nevill	(United Kingdom) Alex Nevill	Privateer
1	2	Donington Park National		(United Kingdom) Alex Nevill	(United Kingdom) Alex Nevill	Privateer
2	3	Snetterton 300	(United Kingdom) Alex Nevill	(United Kingdom) Adrian Norman	(United Kingdom) Alex Nevill	Privateer
2	4	Snetterton 300		(United Kingdom) Gary Papworth	(United Kingdom) Alex Nevill	Privateer
2	5	Snetterton 300		(United Kingdom) Andy Godfrey	(United Kingdom) Alex Nevill	Privateer
3	6	Silverstone National	(United Kingdom) Alex Nevill	(United Kingdom) Andy Godfrey	(United Kingdom) Alex Nevill	Privateer
3	7	Silverstone National		(United Kingdom) Neal Clarke	(United Kingdom) Alex Nevill	Privateer
4	8	Oulton Park Island	(United Kingdom) Andy Godfrey	(United Kingdom) Alex Nevill	(United Kingdom) Andy Godfrey	AReeve Motorsport
4	9	Oulton Park Island		(United Kingdom) Andy Godfrey	(United Kingdom) Alex Nevill	Privateer
5	10	Brands Hatch Indy	(United Kingdom) Alex Nevill	(United Kingdom) Alex Nevill	(United Kingdom) Andy Godfrey	AReeve Motorsport
5	11	Brands Hatch Indy		(United Kingdom) Lee Pearce	(United Kingdom) Andy Godfrey	AReeve Motorsport
5	12	Brands Hatch Indy		(United Kingdom) Alex Nevill	(United Kingdom) Lee Pearce	Privateer
6	13	Cadwell Park	(United Kingdom) Alex Nevill	(United Kingdom) Alex Nevill	(United Kingdom) Alex Nevill	Privateer
6	14	Cadwell Park		(United Kingdom) Andy Godfrey	(United Kingdom) Andy Godfrey	AReeve Motorsport
7	15	Rockingham ISSC	(United Kingdom) Andy Godfrey	(United Kingdom) Alex Nevill	(United Kingdom) Alex Nevill	Privateer
7	16	Rockingham ISSC		(United Kingdom) Andy Godfrey	(United Kingdom) Andy Godfrey	AReeve Motorsport
7	17	Rockingham ISSC		(United Kingdom) Andy Godfrey	(United Kingdom) Alex Nevill	Privateer

== Championship standings ==
Scoring system

Championship points were awarded for the first 34 positions in each Championship Race. Entries were required to complete 75% of the winning car's race distance in order to be classified and earn points. There were bonus points awarded for Pole Position and Fastest Lap.

Championship Race points

Position	1st	2nd	3rd	4th	5th	6th	7th	8th	9th	10th	11th	12th	13th	14th	15th	16th	17th	18th	19th	20th	21st	22nd	23rd	24th	25th	26th	27th	28th	29th	30th	31st	32nd	33rd	34th	PP	FL
Points	50	44	40	37	34	32	30	28	26	24	22	21	20	19	18	17	16	15	14	13	12	11	10	9	8	7	6	5	4	3	2	1	1	1	6	6

Notes

- ^{1} ^{2} ^{3} ^{4} ^{5} ^{6} refers to the classification of the fastest laps, where bonus points are awarded 6–5–4–3–2–1.
- _{1} _{2} _{3} _{4} _{5} _{6} refers to the classification of the drivers after the qualifying for the race 1, where bonus points are awarded 6–5–4–3–2–1.

=== Drivers' Championship ===
==== JCW Class ====
Pos	Driver	OUL		ROC		SNE		SIL		OUL		BHGP		BHI			DON		Pts
1	(United Kingdom) Ant Whorton-Eales	_{2}1^{1}	C	_{1}1^{2}	1^{2}	_{2}Ret	7^{4}	_{3}2^{4}	2^{3}	_{6}3^{4}	1^{6}	_{2}1^{1}	1^{3}	_{2}1^{5}	1^{2}	1^{1}	_{4}1^{2}	4^{3}	756
2	(United Kingdom) Nathan Harrison	_{3}18^{3}	C	_{2}Ret^{5}	3^{1}	_{1}1^{1}	4^{5}	_{2}3^{5}	3^{4}	_{4}4^{5}	3^{4}	_{3}2^{2}	6^{4}	_{5}2^{2}	5^{3}	2^{2}	3^{1}	1^{2}	656
3	(United Kingdom) Jordan Collard	_{1}2^{2}	C	4^{1}	2^{3}	15	6^{1}	_{1}1^{1}	8^{1}	5^{1}	Ret	_{4}4^{5}	5^{2}	_{1}5^{4}	10^{1}	6^{4}	2^{3}	2^{1}	618
4	(United Kingdom) Rob Smith	14	C	5^{3}	5^{6}	_{4}4^{4}	Ret	_{4}4^{2}	1^{2}	_{1}1^{2}	4^{1}	_{5}5	3^{6}	_{3}4^{3}	Ret	10	10	3^{5}	564
5	(United Kingdom) Henry Neal	8^{5}	C	8	Ret	_{5}2^{2}	8	10	4^{5}	12	7	7	13	3^{1}	2	5	Ret	8	469
6	(United Kingdom) David Robinson	_{5}6^{6}	C	12	Ret	6^{6}	1	_{6}11	7	_{2}2^{3}	2^{2}	_{1}3^{5}	4^{1}						391
7	(United Kingdom) Jac Maybin	22	C	13	9	_{3}3^{3}	2^{2}	5^{3}	Ret	11	16	16	12	10	7	12	18^{4}	19^{6}	391
8	(United Kingdom) Luke Reade	_{6}4	C	_{4}2^{4}	Ret	5^{5}	Ret	_{5}Ret^{6}	11	10	11	9	7^{5}	17	9	22	_{6}12^{6}	21	370
9	(United Kingdom) Lewis Brown	9	C	10	4^{5}	_{6}7	3	10	5^{6}	8	Ret	_{6}Ret	11	10	6^{4}	Ret	7^{5}	Ret	367
10	(United Kingdom) Jack Davidson	19	C	Ret	15	8	9^{6}	8	Ret	_{5}15^{6}	17^{5}	Ret^{3}	16	_{4}9	4^{5}	4^{3}	9	10	353
11	(United Kingdom) Lawrence Davey	5^{4}	C	7	8	14	11	17	10	Ret	14	11	9	13	14	7^{5}	19	20	350
12	(United Kingdom) Rory Cuff	10	C	23	7	9	5^{3}	Ret	18	_{3}7	14	Ret	15	12	Ret	13	_{4}8	7	328
13	(United Kingdom) Brad Hutchison	15	C	16	Ret	19	16	9	6	13	6	10	10	_{6}11	Ret	18	16	11	326
14	(United Kingdom) Calum King	13	C	_{6}3	Ret	16	10	Ret	15	21	23	21	18	6^{6}	Ret	11	_{3}6	6	318
15	(United Kingdom) Scott Jeffs	12	C	14	11	13	17	Ret	16	16	10	Ret	Ret	14	11	21	14	13	266
16	(United Kingdom) Ollie Pidgley	11	C	_{5}6	6^{4}	12	13	6	21	14	8								231
17	(United Kingdom) Jake De Haan	24	C	22	Ret	20	DNS	15	12	22	20	13	19	16	13	Ret	13	16	224
18	(United Kingdom) Will Neal	16	C	15	Ret	Ret	DNS	18	17	18	12	15	Ret	18	19	9	Ret	17	211
19	(United Kingdom) Taelor Shand	27	C	26	21	24	20	20	Ret	19	15	18	17	19	16	20	Ret	22	208
20	(United Kingdom) Ryan Dignan	17	C	21	10	17	15	12	14	Ret	18	19	DNS	20	Ret	14	Ret	DNS	199
21	(United Kingdom) George Sutton	20	C	18	Ret	11	12	Ret	9	9	9						6	Ret	191
22	(United Kingdom) Steve King	Ret	C	25	19	23	22	21	22	24	21	20	22	Ret	18	23	21	24	189
23	(United Kingdom) Callum Newsham	28	C	Ret	18	21	19	16	Ret	DNS	DNS	17	20	24	Ret	16	11	15	181
24	(United Kingdom) Stuart Gibbs	26	C	27	20	Ret	21	22	Ret	23	22	Ret	21	23	20	17	Ret	23	155
25	(United Kingdom) James Loukes	Ret	C	20	12			14	13					15	8	15			143
26	(United Kingdom) Louis Doyle		C	11	14	Ret	23	7	19										99
27	(United Kingdom) Joe Tanner	7	C							17	13								70
28	(United Kingdom) Jamie Going		C	19	17									21	17	DNS			64
29	(United Kingdom) Chris Oakman		C			21	Ret			20	Ret						Ret	18	49
30	(United Kingdom) Ben Dimmack	23	C	17	13														48
31	(United Kingdom) Paul Bell	21	C	DSQ	Ret														13
drivers ineligible for points
–	(United Kingdom) Alex Morgan		C									8	2						0
–	(United Kingdom) Paul O'Neill	_{4}3	C							6	5^{3}								0
–	(United Kingdom) Dan Zelos		C											8	3^{6}	3			0
–	(United Kingdom) Ben Palmer		C														_{1}5	5	0
–	(United Kingdom) James Gornall		C	_{3}9^{6}	Ret							6^{4}	8				_{2}15	9^{4}	0
–	(United Kingdom) Luke Caudle		C											Ret	12	8^{6}	20	14	0
–	(United Kingdom) Sam Weller		C			10	14					14	Ret				Ret	DNS	0
–	(United Kingdom) Jono Davis		C									12	14				17	12	0
–	(United Kingdom) James Mckintyre		C											22	15	19			0
–	(United Kingdom) Henry Lee		C	24	16														0
–	(United Kingdom) Will Beaumont		C			22	18												0
–	(United Kingdom) David Green		C					19	20										0
–	(United Kingdom) Matt Neal	25	C																0
–	(United Kingdom) Rob Collard		C							Ret	Ret								0
–	(United Kingdom) James Mills		C									DNS	DNS						0
–	(United Kingdom) Dave Newsham		C					DNS	DNS										0

==== Open Class ====
Pos	Driver	DON		SNE			SIL		OUL		BHI			CAD		ROC			Pts
1	(United Kingdom) Will Fairclough	_{4}1^{1}	3^{2}	_{3}5	3^{2}	2^{2}	1^{1}	2^{2}	_{1}1^{2}	5^{3}	_{1}1^{1}	1^{2}	2^{2}	_{2}2^{2}	4^{1}	5^{6}	4^{2}	5^{3}	745
2	(United Kingdom) Rob Austin	3^{4}	1^{3}	3^{5}	2^{4}	1^{4}	_{2}2^{3}	5^{5}	_{2}3^{4}	3^{5}	_{3}2^{2}	3^{3}	3^{3}	_{4}3^{4}	3^{4}	_{6}Ret	Ret	DNS	649
3	(United Kingdom) Jono Davis	_{1}Ret^{2}	DNS	_{6}2^{2}	1^{3}	Ret	_{1}8^{2}	1^{1}	DNS	Ret^{1}	_{2}DNS	2^{1}	1^{1}	_{3}1^{1}	1^{2}	_{1}1^{1}	1^{1}	1^{1}	616
4	(United Kingdom) Chloe Hewitt	4^{6}	6	6	8^{5}	7^{5}	4^{5}	6^{6}	8	8	4	4	4^{5}	_{5}9	8	8	7	7	493
5	(United Kingdom) Andy Montgomery	_{5}5	5^{6}	_{4}4	4	3^{3}	_{4}3^{4}	3^{4}	_{6}5^{6}	4	Ret	6^{4}	6^{6}	7^{6}	Ret	DSQ	8	DNS	483
6	(United Kingdom) Kevin Owen	6^{5}	2^{1}	_{2}9^{4}	Ret	5	_{5}6	4^{3}	_{5}6	7	_{6}3	Ret^{5}	DNS	8	7	DSQ	9	DNS	418
7	(United Kingdom) Sami Bowler	_{6}7	8	5^{3}	Ret	DNS	_{6}5^{6}	8	9	9	5^{6}	Ret	5^{4}	10	9	10	11	9	407
8	(United Kingdom) Alan Lee	Ret	DNS	10	9	6^{6}	_{3}7	7	7^{5}	6^{6}	Ret	Ret	8	11	10	9	10	8	366
9	(United Kingdom) Andy Langley			_{2}1^{1}	7^{1}	4^{1}								4^{5}	6^{6}	_{2}2^{5}	3^{4}	4^{2}	349
10	(United Kingdom) Stuart McLaren								_{4}4^{3}	2^{4}	_{4}Ret^{3}	Ret	7	_{6}5	5^{5}	_{3}3^{2}	6^{6}	6^{6}	314
11	(United Kingdom) Tom Halliwell								_{3}2^{1}	1^{2}	_{5}Ret^{4}	5^{6}	Ret			7^{3}	5^{5}	3^{4}	262
12	(United Kingdom) Dan Butcher-Lloyd													_{1}6^{3}	2^{3}	_{4}4^{4}	2^{3}	2^{5}	227
13	(United Kingdom) Stu Lane	_{2}2^{3}	Ret^{5}	8^{6}	5	DSQ													118
14	(United Kingdom) Neil Brown	9	7				Ret	DNS			6	DNS	DNS						88
15	(United Kingdom) Tim Bill	_{3}Ret	4^{4}	_{5}Ret	4^{6}	Ret													75
16	(United Kingdom) Neil Ginley	8	9																54
17	(United Kingdom) Pete Jonkinon															6	DNS	DNS	32

==== Cooper Pro Class ====
Pos	Driver	DON		SNE			SIL		OUL		BHI			CAD			ROC		Pts
1	(United Kingdom) Kyle Reid	_{1}1^{1}	1^{4}	_{2}1^{1}	1^{3}	1^{1}	_{1}1^{4}	2^{1}	_{2}4^{3}	1^{2}	_{4}1^{5}	1^{2}	1^{1}	_{3}1^{5}	6^{5}	_{3}2^{3}	1^{1}	3^{2}	826
2	(United Kingdom) Robert Dalgliesh	4^{5}	4^{3}	2^{2}	2^{1}	4^{2}	_{3}3^{1}	1	_{3}1^{2}	3^{1}	_{6}3^{1}	3^{5}	2^{2}	_{4}2^{4}	1^{1}	_{4}3^{5}	3^{4}	4^{3}	720
3	(United Kingdom) Toby Goodman	5^{6}	3^{5}	7^{6}	6^{2}	5^{6}	12	11^{6}	_{4}3^{4}	4^{5}	_{1}4^{2}	5^{6}	4^{4}	_{5}3^{2}	5^{1}	_{1}1^{2}	2^{2}	2^{1}	635
4	(United Kingdom) Simon Walton	_{2}2^{2}	5^{1}	_{1}3^{5}	5^{4}	8^{4}	_{2}2^{2}	3^{4}			_{2}Ret	8	5^{5}	_{2}4^{1}	3^{3}	_{2}6^{1}	5^{3}	1^{3}	603
5	(United Kingdom) Richard Newman	_{5}7	7	5^{3}	4^{5}	2	_{5}5^{5}	7^{5}	_{6}6^{6}	6^{4}	_{3}2^{4}	4^{4}	3^{3}	_{1}Ret^{3}	2^{4}	_{6}11	4^{5}	11	566
6	(United Kingdom) Jacob Andrews	9^{4}	6^{2}	_{6}4^{4}	3	3^{5}	4^{3}	4^{3}	_{5}5^{5}	5^{6}	5^{6}	6	6^{6}	_{6}5^{6}	4^{2}	4	6	5^{5}	566
7	(United Kingdom) James Goodall	_{4}8	9	_{4}6	9^{6}	6^{3}	_{6}7^{6}	6^{2}			_{5}6^{3}	10^{3}	9	6	7	_{5}5^{4}	7^{6}	7	478
8	(United Kingdom) Lydia Walmsley	11	10	8	8	9	8	8	7	7	7	7	7	DNS	DNS	10^{6}	10	9	409
9	(United Kingdom) Mark Cornell	12	11	10	10	10	10	12	9	9	8	2^{1}	8	8	9	9	9	10	406
10	(United Kingdom) Charlie Cooper	14	14	9	DNS	DNS	11	13			9	9	10	7	8	8	8	8	324
11	(United Kingdom) Stuart McLaren	10	8	_{5}Ret	7	7	9	9											164
12	(United Kingdom) Ethan Pitt	_{3}3^{3}	2^{6}	_{3}11	DNS	DNS	Ret	10											143
13	(United Kingdom) Andy Jordon						_{4}6	5	8	8									125
14	(United Kingdom) Martin Poole	_{6}Ret	15						_{1}2^{1}	2^{3}									123
15	(United Kingdom) Matt Hammond															7	Ret	6^{6}	63
16	(United Kingdom) Rory Cuff	6	12																53
17	(United Kingdom) Oli O'Neill	13	13	Ret	DNS	DNS													40
drivers ineligible for points
–	(South Africa) Emma Walsh										10	Ret	11						0

==== Cooper Am Class ====
Pos	Driver	DON		SNE			SIL		OUL		BHI			CAD			ROC		Pts
1	(United Kingdom) Alex Nevill	_{1}1^{1}	1^{1}	_{1}1^{5}	1^{2}	1^{3}	_{1}1^{2}	1^{3}	_{3}2^{1}	1^{2}	_{1}2^{1}	Ret^{4}	4^{1}	_{1}1^{1}	2^{2}	1^{1}	2^{2}	1^{2}	836
2	(United Kingdom) Andy Godfrey	_{2}2^{4}	Ret^{2}	_{2}2^{4}	2^{3}	3^{1}	_{2}2^{1}	2^{2}	_{1}1^{2}	2^{1}	_{2}1^{2}	1^{2}	3^{4}	_{2}2^{2}	1^{1}	_{1}2^{2}	1^{1}	2^{1}	799
3	(United Kingdom) Gary Papworth	5^{2}	2^{4}	_{3}4^{3}	5^{1}	2^{4}	_{5}5^{6}	6^{5}	_{4}3^{4}	3^{4}	_{3}4^{3}	4^{5}	2^{3}	_{4}3^{4}	3^{5}	_{4}4^{3}	3^{3}	Ret^{3}	662
4	(United Kingdom) Adrian Norman	_{4}4^{3}	3^{3}	_{5}5^{1}	4^{5}	8^{6}	_{4}3^{5}	4^{4}	_{5}4^{5}	4^{5}	_{4}5^{5}	3^{3}	5^{5}	7	8	_{2}3^{5}	4^{4}	5^{4}	607
5	(United Kingdom) Neal Clarke	_{3}3^{5}	Ret^{5}	_{4}3^{2}	3^{4}	8^{2}	_{3}Ret^{4}	3^{1}	_{2}5^{3}	Ret^{3}	Ret	5^{6}	6^{6}	_{5}5^{6}	5^{4}	_{3}5^{4}	5^{6}	4^{5}	529
6	(United Kingdom) Keir McConomy	8	6	8	8	6	7	8	_{6}6^{6}	5^{6}	_{6}7	7	7	_{6}4^{5}	6^{6}	_{6}7	7	6	476
7	(United Kingdom) Darryl Brown	_{5}6	4	_{6}7	6^{6}	4^{5}	_{6}4^{3}	5^{6}			6^{6}	6	Ret	6	7	Ret	8	7	436
8	(United Kingdom) Lee Pearce										_{5}3^{4}	2^{1}	1^{2}	_{3}Ret^{3}	4^{3}	_{5}6^{6}	6^{5}	3^{6}	309
9	(United Kingdom) Elspeth Rodgers	9	7	6^{6}	7	5	6	7	7	6									277
10	(United Kingdom) Wai Kong Yau	_{6}7^{6}	5^{6}																67
