= Nathan Harrison =

British racing driver (born 1996)

- Harrison's car (right) at Brands Hatch in 2022
- Nationality: (United Kingdom) British
- Born: Nathan Roy Harrison; 30 July 1996 (age 30) Oxford, England

Mini Challenge UK – JCW career
- Debut season: 2016
- Years active: 2016, 2018–2020, 2023, 2025
- Former teams: Coastal Racing; MINI UK VIP; EXCELR8 Motorsport
- Starts: 51
- Wins: 10
- Podiums: 28
- Poles: 5
- Fastest laps: 15
- Best finish: 1st in 2020

Previous series
- 2024 2021–2022 2017 2015 2012: British GT Championship – GT4; Porsche Carrera Cup Great Britain; Renault UK Clio Cup; Mini Challenge Trophy; Ginetta Junior Championship

Championship titles
- 2020 2015: Mini Challenge UK – JCW; Mini Challenge Trophy

Nathan Roy Harrison (born 30 July 1996) is a British racing driver who last competed in a one-off round of the 2025 Mini Challenge UK for EXCELR8 Motorsport. He won the JCW class of the series in 2020, and the Cooper class in 2015.

== Racing career ==
=== Ginetta debut (2012) ===
Harrison debuted in racing in 2012, joining Hillspeed in the Ginetta Junior Championship. He only competed in the first 3 meetings of the season, with 3 top 5 finishes in the 6 races he partook in.

=== Return to racing (2015) ===
After funding issues halted his racing career, Harrison returned to racing in 2015, joining the Mini Challenge Trophy. Harrison won the championship, graduating to the JCW class in 2016.

Harrison moved up to the JCW class of the Mini Challenge UK for Coastal Racing, with him finishing runner-up behind David Grady.

For 2017, Harrison moved to the Renault UK Clio Cup, for JamSport Racing, and later Team Pyro. He finished 10th in the championship, scoring 2 podiums. He won the season's Graduate Cup.

Harrison returned to the Mini Challenge UK JCW class for 2018, competing with Excelr8 Motorsport once more. For the second time, he finished runner-up behind Ant Whorton-Eales.

2019 saw Harrison switch to the MINI UK VIP team. He scored the most points of anyone, but lost by 2 points to James Gornall due to drop score.

Harrison moved back to Excelr8 Motorsport for 2020. He ended up in a title fight with series rookie Dan Zelos, who he ended up beating to win the championship.

=== Porsche Carrera Cup switch (2021) ===
For 2021, Harrison switched to another ToCA support series, being the Porsche Carrera Cup Great Britain and competing with a BTCC team of Team HARD. Harrison contested all rounds to place 4th in the Pro-Am class, behind future BTCC driver Charles Rainford.

Harrison switched to Redline Racing for a second campaign in the series. He improved to runner-up in the campaign, behind Pro-Am champion Charles Rainford again.

=== Mini Challenge guest appearance (2023) ===
For 2023, Harrison only contested the season finale of the Mini Challenge UK, for EXCELR8 Motorsport. No outright podiums were scored by Harrison, with 1 fastest lap and three top 5 finishes.

=== GT debut (2024) ===
Harrison debuted in GT racing in 2024, competing in the GT4 class of the British GT Championship for Mahiki Racing, alongside former Mini Challenge UK driver Steven Lake. Harrison and Lake failed to score a podium throughout the campaign, placing 21st with 8 points.

=== Mini Challenge return (2025) ===
For the second time in 3 years, Harrison made a guest appearance at the season finale of the Mini Challenge UK for EXCELR8 Motorsport. A trio of top 5 finishes were scored by Harrison, but no podiums.

== Racing record ==
Season	Series	Team	Races	Wins	Poles	F/Laps	Podiums	Points	Position
2012	Ginetta Junior Championship	Hillspeed	6	0	0	0	0	92	13th
2015	Mini Challenge Trophy	Coastal Racing	19	10	?	?	16	902	1st
2016	Mini Challenge UK – JCW	Excelr8 Motorsport	16	2	?	?	11	614	2nd
2017	Renault UK Clio Cup	JamSport Racing	2	0	0	0	0	228	10th
2017	Renault UK Clio Cup	Team Pyro	16	0	0	0	2	228	10th
2018	Mini Challenge UK – JCW	Excelr8 Motorsport	17	2	1	3	10	656	2nd
2019	Mini Challenge UK – JCW	MINI UK VIP	17	5	2	6	14	791	2nd
2020	Mini Challenge UK – JCW	Excelr8 Motorsport	13	3	2	5	6	465	1st
2021	Porsche Carrera Cup Great Britain – Pro-Am	Team HARD.	16	3	4	1	9	88	4th
2022	Porsche Carrera Cup Great Britain – Pro-Am	Redline Racing	16	3	2	3	10	111	2nd
2023	Mini Challenge UK – JCW	EXCELR8 Motorsport	3	0	0	1	0	0†	NC†
2024	British GT Championship – GT4	Mahiki Racing	9	0	0	0	0	0	21st
2025	Mini Challenge UK – JCW	EXCELR8 Motorsport	3	0	0	0	0	0†	NC†

† – As Harrison was a guest driver, he was ineligible for championship points.
