= 2016 Renault UK Clio Cup =

The 2016 Renault UK Clio Cup is a multi-event, one make motor racing championship held across England. The championship features a mix of professional motor racing teams and privately funded drivers competing in the Clio Renaultsport 200 Turbo EDC that conform to the technical regulations for the championship. It forms part of the extensive program of support categories built up around the BTCC. It will be the 21st Renault Clio Cup United Kingdom season and the 41st of UK motorsport undertaken by Renault and Renault Sport. The first race takes place on 2 April at Brands Hatch on the circuit's Indy configuration and concluded on 2 October at the same venue, utilising the Grand Prix circuit, after eighteen races held at nine meetings.

== Teams and drivers ==
Team	No.	Drivers	Class	Rounds
Team Pyro	1	(United Kingdom) Mike Bushell		All
Team Pyro	28	(United Kingdom) Josh Price		All
Team Pyro	44	(Republic of Ireland) David Dickenson		All
Team Pyro	99	(United Kingdom) Darren Johnson	M	2
JamSport Racing	2	(United Kingdom) Chris Smiley		6–9
JamSport Racing	8	(United Kingdom) Luke Kidsley		All
JamSport Racing	15	(United Kingdom) Paul Donkin		9
JamSport Racing	27	(United Kingdom) James Grint		9
JamSport Racing	50	(United Kingdom) Graham Field	M	1–4, 8–9
Ciceley Motorsport	3	(United Kingdom) Ollie Pidgley	G	All
Ciceley Motorsport	45	(United Kingdom) Dan Zelos	G	All
Ciceley Motorsport	71	(United Kingdom) Max Coates	G	All
PP Motorsport	4	(United Kingdom) James Colburn		8–9
PP Motorsport	11	(United Kingdom) Anton Spires		1–7
20Ten Racing	6	(United Kingdom) Peter Felix	M	1
20Ten Racing	7	(United Kingdom) Sam Watkins	G	1–4
20Ten Racing	55	(United Kingdom) Tom Butler	G	1–2
20Ten Racing	65	(United Kingdom) Craig Milner	M	2, 6
JamSport with AWE Motorsport	10	(United Kingdom) Ant Whorton-Eales		All
Team Cooksport	13	(United Kingdom) Rory Collingbourne		All
Team Cooksport	24	(United Kingdom) George Jackson		All
Team Cooksport	46	(United Kingdom) Lee Pattison	M	All
Team Cooksport	88	(United Kingdom) Shayne Deegan	G	6–8
Vanquish Motorsport with WDE	20	(United Kingdom) Paul Plant		1–3, 6
R-Tech Team Pyro	21	(United Kingdom) Ben Davis		8
WDE Motorsport	22	(United Kingdom) Paul Rivett		All
WDE Motorsport	23	(United Kingdom) Charlie Ladell		All
WDE Motorsport	63	(United Kingdom) Rory Green		1–2, 4–6
Finesse Motorsport; Team EcoMotive with Finesse	26	(United Kingdom) Paul Streather	G	All
Finesse Motorsport; Team EcoMotive with Finesse	92	(United Kingdom) Jake Giddings	G	3–4, 8
Finesse Motorsport; Team EcoMotive with Finesse	32	(United Kingdom) Daniel Rowbottom		2–5
Team EcoMotive with DRM	32	(United Kingdom) Daniel Rowbottom		1
Team BMR with Pyro	66	(United Kingdom) Senna Proctor	G	All

Icon	Class
M	Masters Cup
G	Graduate Cup

== Race calendar and results ==
The provisional calendar was announced by the championship organisers on 28 October 2015. Snetterton Motor Racing Circuit returns to the calendar in 2016, replacing the round held at Knockhill Racing Circuit.

Round		Circuit	Date	Pole position	Fastest lap	Winning driver	Winning team
1	R1	Brands Hatch (Indy Circuit, Kent)	2 April	(United Kingdom) Daniel Rowbottom	(United Kingdom) Ant Whorton-Eales	(United Kingdom) Paul Streather	Finesse Motorsport
1	R2	Brands Hatch (Indy Circuit, Kent)	3 April	(United Kingdom) Lee Pattison	(United Kingdom) Ant Whorton-Eales	(United Kingdom) Lee Pattison	Team Cooksport
2	R3	Donington Park (National Circuit, Leicestershire)	17 April	(United Kingdom) Max Coates	(United Kingdom) Max Coates	(United Kingdom) Ant Whorton-Eales	JamSport with AWE Motorsport
2	R4	Donington Park (National Circuit, Leicestershire)	17 April	(United Kingdom) Ant Whorton-Eales	(United Kingdom) Paul Streather	(United Kingdom) Ant Whorton-Eales	JamSport with AWE Motorsport
3	R5	Thruxton Circuit (Hampshire)	8 May	(United Kingdom) Mike Bushell	(United Kingdom) Ant Whorton-Eales	(United Kingdom) Ant Whorton-Eales	JamSport with AWE Motorsport
3	R6	Thruxton Circuit (Hampshire)	8 May	(United Kingdom) Mike Bushell	(United Kingdom) Mike Bushell	(United Kingdom) Ant Whorton-Eales	JamSport with AWE Motorsport
4	R7	Oulton Park (Island Circuit, Cheshire)	4 June	(United Kingdom) Mike Bushell	(United Kingdom) Mike Bushell	(United Kingdom) Mike Bushell	Team Pyro
4	R8	Oulton Park (Island Circuit, Cheshire)	5 June	(United Kingdom) Mike Bushell	(United Kingdom) Charlie Ladell	(United Kingdom) Ant Whorton-Eales	JamSport with AWE Motorsport
5	R9	Croft Circuit (North Yorkshire)	18 June	(United Kingdom) Paul Rivett	(United Kingdom) Lee Pattison	(United Kingdom) Paul Rivett	4Front Motor Group with WDE
5	R10	Croft Circuit (North Yorkshire)	19 June	(United Kingdom) Mike Bushell	(United Kingdom) Paul Rivett	(United Kingdom) Max Coates	Ciceley Motorsport
6	R11	Snetterton Motor Racing Circuit (300 Circuit, Norfolk)	31 July	(United Kingdom) Mike Bushell	(United Kingdom) Max Coates	(United Kingdom) Mike Bushell	Team Pyro
6	R12	Snetterton Motor Racing Circuit (300 Circuit, Norfolk)	31 July	(United Kingdom) Mike Bushell	(United Kingdom) Paul Rivett	(United Kingdom) Ant Whorton-Eales	JamSport with AWE Motorsport
7	R13	Rockingham Motor Speedway (International Super Sports Car Circuit, Northamptonshire)	27 August	(United Kingdom) Mike Bushell	(United Kingdom) Ant Whorton-Eales	(United Kingdom) Ant Whorton-Eales	JamSport with AWE Motorsport
7	R14	Rockingham Motor Speedway (International Super Sports Car Circuit, Northamptonshire)	28 August	(United Kingdom) Mike Bushell	(United Kingdom) Mike Bushell	(United Kingdom) Mike Bushell	Team Pyro
8	R15	Silverstone Circuit (National Circuit, Northamptonshire)	17 September	(United Kingdom) Max Coates	(United Kingdom) Ollie Pidgley	(United Kingdom) Ant Whorton-Eales	JamSport with AWE Motorsport
8	R16	Silverstone Circuit (National Circuit, Northamptonshire)	17 September	(United Kingdom) Mike Bushell	(United Kingdom) Paul Streather	(United Kingdom) Ant Whorton-Eales	JamSport with AWE Motorsport
9	R17	Brands Hatch (Grand Prix Circuit, Kent)	1 October	(United Kingdom) Mike Bushell	(United Kingdom) Paul Rivett	(United Kingdom) Paul Rivett	4Front Motor Group with WDE
9	R18	Brands Hatch (Grand Prix Circuit, Kent)	2 October	(United Kingdom) Mike Bushell	(United Kingdom) Luke Kidsley	(United Kingdom) Josh Price	Team Pyro

== Championship standings ==
=== Drivers' championship ===
Points system
**1st**	**2nd**	**3rd**	**4th**	**5th**	**6th**	**7th**	**8th**	**9th**	**10th**	**11th**	**12th**	**13th**	**14th**	**15th**	**16th**	**17th**	**18th**	**19th**	**20th**	Fastest lap
32	28	25	22	20	18	16	14	12	11	10	9	8	7	6	5	4	3	2	1	2

Notes

- A driver's best 16 scores counted towards the championship, with any other points being discarded.

Pos	Driver	BHI		DON		THR		OUL		CRO		SNE		ROC		SIL		BHGP		Total	Drop	Pen.	Points
1	(United Kingdom) Ant Whorton-Eales	8	6	1	**1**	1	1	2	1	4	7	Ret	1	1	4	1	1	4	7	430			430
2	(United Kingdom) Mike Bushell	4	3	5	6	**3**	**2**	**1**	**2**	3	**2**	**1**	**4**	**3**	**1**	2	**2**	**Ret**	**Ret**	422			422
3	(United Kingdom) Max Coates	6	8	**4**	5	9	10	3	5	2	1	2	5	8	3	**5**	3	6	2	394	23		361
4	(United Kingdom) Paul Rivett	3	2	3	2	4	8	7	12	**1**	17	Ret	3	2	2	4	4	1	16	364	4		360
5	(United Kingdom) Lee Pattison	2	**1**	2	18	5	4	6	7	11	6	5	8	16	13	18	6	3	8	300	7		293
6	(United Kingdom) Josh Price	7	13	Ret	9	2	3	9	15	Ret	3	4	12	6	5	3	17	2	1	286			286
7	(United Kingdom) Paul Streather	1	4	7	4	15	6	13	9	6	5	13	6	14	15	9	9	Ret	6	259	6		253
8	(United Kingdom) Senna Proctor	11	21	Ret	8	8	9	4	3	7	8	3	10	Ret	6	13	5	5	4	249			249
9	(United Kingdom) Charlie Ladell	5	5	Ret	3	14	11	5	4	Ret	4	14	9	7	7	10	Ret	Ret	3	233			233
10	(Republic of Ireland) David Dickenson	12	9	Ret	15	7	7	12	11	8	Ret	6	11	4	8	7	11	Ret	12	191			191
11	(United Kingdom) Luke Kidsley	9	17	13	12	Ret	16	10	8	12	13	19	2	Ret	12	8	7	Ret	Ret	147			147
12	(United Kingdom) Rory Collingbourne	13	22	11	10	12	14	16	18	10	12	12	13	15	9	14	12	10	9	147	3		144
13	(United Kingdom) George Jackson	14	10	6	14	10	15	18	14	9	15	10	20	13	Ret	17	18	9	Ret	125			125
14	(United Kingdom) Daniel Rowbottom	**Ret**	7	8	7	13	NC	8	6	5	9									118			118
15	(United Kingdom) Anton Spires	17	15	9	Ret	6	5	14	17	14	10	9	16	11	Ret					114			114
16	(United Kingdom) Ollie Pidgley	16	11	10	Ret	17	12	15	16	13	11	16	14	12	11	16	10	Ret	Ret	112			112
17	(United Kingdom) Chris Smiley											8	7	5	Ret	11	14	7	10	92			92
18	(United Kingdom) Dan Zelos	Ret	20	Ret	Ret	Ret	20	17	19	Ret	16	7	15	10	14	Ret	15	11	11	79			79
19	(United Kingdom) James Colburn															6	8	8	5	66			66
20	(United Kingdom) Jake Giddings					11	13	19	10							12	16			45			45
21	(United Kingdom) Rory Green	20	16	Ret	Ret			11	13	15	14	17	18							42			42
22	(United Kingdom) Shayne Deegan											15	17	9	10	Ret	13			41			41
23	(United Kingdom) Paul Plant	10	14	Ret	11	Ret	17					11	Ret							40			40
24	(United Kingdom) Graham Field	19	23	15	17	Ret	18	20	21							19	19	13	15	34			34
25	(United Kingdom) Sam Watkins	15	12	12	Ret	16	19	DNS	20											30			30
26	(United Kingdom) Paul Donkin																	12	13	17			17
27	(United Kingdom) Tom Butler	18	19	16	13															16			16
28	(United Kingdom) Craig Milner			17	16							18	19							14			14
29	(United Kingdom) Darren Johnson			14	19															9			9
30	(United Kingdom) James Grint																	Ret	14	7			7
31	(United Kingdom) Ben Davis															15	Ret			6			6
32	(United Kingdom) Peter Felix	Ret	18																	3			3
Pos	Driver	BHI		DON		THR		OUL		CRO		SNE		ROC		SIL		BHGP		Total	Drop	Pen.	Points

Colour	Result
Gold	Winner
Silver	Second place
Bronze	Third place
Green	Points classification
Blue	Non-points classification
Blue	Non-classified finish (NC)
Purple	Retired, not classified (Ret)
Red	Did not qualify (DNQ)
Red	Did not pre-qualify (DNPQ)
Black	Disqualified (DSQ)
White	Did not start (DNS)
White	Withdrew (WD)
White	Race cancelled (C)
Blank	Did not practice (DNP)
Blank	Did not arrive (DNA)
Blank	Excluded (EX)

**Bold** – Pole
Italics – Fastest Lap

=== Teams' championship ===
Pos	Team	BHI		DON		THR		OUL		CRO		SNE		ROC	SIL	BHGP	Points
1	Team Pyro; Team BMR with Pyro	4	3	5	5	2	2	1	2	3	2	1	4				531
1	Team Pyro; Team BMR with Pyro	7	9	14	7	3	3	4	3	7	3	3	10				531
2	JamSport Racing; JamSport with AWE Motorsport	8	6	1	11	1	1	2	1	4	7	8	1				414
2	JamSport Racing; JamSport with AWE Motorsport	17	9	13	16	Ret	16	10	8	12	13	19	2				414
3	WDE Motorsport; Vanquish Motorsport with WDE	3	2	3	1	4	8	5	4	1	4	11	3				412
3	WDE Motorsport; Vanquish Motorsport with WDE	5	5	Ret	2	14	11	7	12	15	14	14	9				412
4	Team Cooksport	2	1	2	9	5	4	6	7	9	6	5	8				352
4	Team Cooksport	13	10	6	13	10	14	16	14	10	12	10	13				352
5	Ciceley Motorsport	6	8	4	4	9	10	3	5	2	1	2	5				341
5	Ciceley Motorsport	16	11	10	Ret	17	12	15	16	13	11	7	14				341
6	Finesse Motorsport; Team EcoMotive with Finesse	1	4	7	3	11	6	8	6	5	5	13	6				314
6	Finesse Motorsport; Team EcoMotive with Finesse			8	6	13	13	13	9	6	9						314
7	PP Motorsport	17	15	9	Ret	6	5	14	17	14	10	9	16				106
8	20Ten Racing	15	12	12	12	16	19	DNS	20			18	19				61
8	20Ten Racing	18	18	16	15												61
9	Team EcoMotive with DRM	Ret	14														16
Pos	Team	BHI		DON		THR		OUL		CRO		SNE		ROC	SIL	BHGP	Points

Colour	Result
Gold	Winner
Silver	Second place
Bronze	Third place
Green	Points classification
Blue	Non-points classification
Blue	Non-classified finish (NC)
Purple	Retired, not classified (Ret)
Red	Did not qualify (DNQ)
Red	Did not pre-qualify (DNPQ)
Black	Disqualified (DSQ)
White	Did not start (DNS)
White	Withdrew (WD)
White	Race cancelled (C)
Blank	Did not practice (DNP)
Blank	Did not arrive (DNA)
Blank	Excluded (EX)
