= Pidgley =

Pidgley is a surname. Notable people with the surname include:

- Ollie Pidgley (born 1997), British racing driver
- Tony Pidgley (1947–2020), English businessman

== See also ==
- Pidley
- Lenny Pidgeley
