= 2020 Mini Challenge UK =

Motor racing competition

The 2020 Quaife Mini Challenge season was the nineteenth season of the Mini Challenge UK. The season was supposed to start on 28 March at Donington Park and end on 20 October at Donington Park. It included sixteen rounds across the UK, all the JCW Class races and 2 of the Cooper Class races support the British Touring Car Championship. The season featured the start of the JCW Mini Challenge Trophy.

Due to the COVID-19 pandemic, the schedule was drastically reduced to five rounds starting 1/2 August.

== Calendar ==
The original calendar was as follows:

Round	Circuit	Date	Classes	Races
1	Donington Park National	28–29 March	JCW	3
2	Brands Hatch Indy	11–12 April	JCW	3
3	Silverstone National	25–26 April	JCW	3
4	Cadwell Park	8 May	JCW Mini Challenge Trophy, Cooper S	2
5	Thruxton Circuit	16–17 May	Cooper	3
6	Oulton Park Island	13–14 June	JCW	2
7	Oulton Park Island	20 June	JCW Mini Challenge Trophy, Cooper S, Cooper	2
8	Snetterton 300	4 July	JCW Mini Challenge Trophy, Cooper S, Cooper	2
9	Snetterton 300	25–26 July	JCW	3
10	Brands Hatch Indy	8–9 August	JCW Mini Challenge Trophy, Cooper S, Cooper	3
11	Croft Circuit	15–16 August	JCW	2
12	Knockhill Racing Circuit	29–30 August	JCW	3
13	Donington Park National	12 September	JCW Mini Challenge Trophy, Cooper S, Cooper	2
14	Silverstone International	26–27 September	Cooper	3
15	Brands Hatch GP	10–11 October	JCW	3
16	Donington Park National	24 October	JCW Mini Challenge Trophy, Cooper S, Cooper	2

Due to the COVID-19 pandemic, the new schedule is as follows:

Round	Circuit	Date	Classes	Races
1	Donington Park National	1–2 August	JCW	3
2	Oulton Park Island	22–23 August	Cooper	2
3	Knockhill Racing Circuit	29–30 August	JCW	3
4	Brands Hatch Indy	12 September	JCW Mini Challenge Trophy, Cooper S	2
5	Thruxton Circuit	19–20 September	Cooper	3
6	Silverstone National	26–27 September	JCW	3
7	Snetterton 300	26 September	JCW Mini Challenge Trophy, Cooper S, Cooper	2
8	Croft Circuit	10–11 October	Cooper	2
9	Snetterton 300	24–25 October	JCW	2
10	Donington Park National	7–8 November	JCW Mini Challenge Trophy, Cooper S, Cooper	2
11	Brands Hatch Indy	14–15 November	JCW	2

== Entry list ==
Team	No.	Driver	Rounds
JCW Class
JamSport Racing	5	(United Kingdom) James Griffith	1, 3–5
JamSport Racing	10	(United Kingdom) Ant Whorton-Eales	All
JamSport Racing	22	(United Kingdom) Oliver Barker	4
JamSport Racing	23	(United Kingdom) Ethan Hammerton	1–3
JamSport Racing	46	(United Kingdom) Stuart Gibbs	1–2
JamSport Racing	88	(United Kingdom) Tom Rawlings	All
MPH Racing	6	(United Kingdom) Calum King	1–4
MPH Racing	17	(United Kingdom) Brad Hutchison	All
Lux Motorsport	4	(United Kingdom) Liam Lambert	4–5
Lux Motorsport	8	(United Kingdom) Hannah Chapman	2–3, 5
Lux Motorsport	13	(United Kingdom) Ryan Faulconbridge	All
Lux Motorsport	21	(United Kingdom) Jack Davidson	All
Lux Motorsport	24	(United Kingdom) Joe Tanner	2
Lux Motorsport	66	(United Kingdom) Ronan Pearson	All
Lux Motorsport	85	(United Kingdom) Steve King	2–4
Autotech Motorsport	9	(United Kingdom) Billy Hardy	All
Lawrence Davey Racing	12	(United Kingdom) Neil Trotter	All
Lawrence Davey Racing	16	(United Kingdom) Callum Newsham	All
Lawrence Davey Racing	39	(United Kingdom) Lewis Brown	All
Lawrence Davey Racing	91	(United Kingdom) Robbie Dalgleish	All
Excelr8 Motorsport	20	(United Kingdom) Kyle Reid	1–2
Excelr8 Motorsport	27	(United Kingdom) Nathan Harrison	All
Excelr8 Motorsport	36	(United Kingdom) William Newnham	1–4
Excelr8 Motorsport	45	(United Kingdom) Dan Zelos	All
Excelr8 Motorsport	99	(United Kingdom) Josh Stanton	All
Excelr8 Motorsport	123	(United Kingdom) Isaac Smith	All
Excelr8 Motorsport	315	(United Kingdom) Jason Lockwood	All
Excelr8 Motorsport	333	(Serbia) Neb Bursac	3–4
JWB Motorsport	31	(United Kingdom) Matthew Wilson	All
Elite Motorsport	44	(United Kingdom) Max Bird	All
Elite Motorsport	71	(United Kingdom) Max Coates	All
Elite Motorsport	77	(United Kingdom) Lewis Galer	1, 3
Privateer	47	(United Kingdom) James McIntyre	All
Privateer	84	(United Kingdom) Ryan Dignan	1, 4
JCW Mini Challenge Trophy
Lawrence Davey Racing	112	(United Kingdom) Neil Trotter	1
Cooper S Class
AReeve Motorsport	21	(United Kingdom) Keir McConomy	1
AReeve Motorsport	24	(United Kingdom) Rob Austin	1
AReeve Motorsport	33	(United Kingdom) Stu Lane	1
AReeve Motorsport	47	(United Kingdom) James Goodall	1
AReeve Motorsport	190	(United Kingdom) Alan Lee	1
DanKanMiniShop	23	(United Kingdom) Dan Butcher-Lord	1
College of West Anglia	55	(United Kingdom) Gary Papworth	1
Privateer	231	(United Kingdom) Steve Webb	1
Privateer	666	(United Kingdom) Sami Bowler	1
Cooper Class
DanKanMiniShop	2	(United Kingdom) James Hillery	TBA
DanKanMiniShop	35	(United Kingdom) Ben Kasperczak	TBA
Lawrence Davey Racing	4	(United Kingdom) Mike Paul	TBA
Lawrence Davey Racing	20	(United Kingdom) Charlie Mann	TBA
Lawrence Davey Racing	60	(Republic of Ireland) Brendan Fitzgerald	TBA
Excelr8 Motorsport	5	(United Kingdom) Nicky Taylor	TBA
Excelr8 Motorsport	29	(United Kingdom) Leonardo Panayiotou	TBA
Excelr8 Motorsport	94	(United Kingdom) Josh Porter	TBA
Excelr8 Motorsport	99	(United Kingdom) Ben Jenkins	TBA
Graves Motorsport	10	(United Kingdom) Bradley Gravett	TBA
Graves Motorsport	16	(United Kingdom) Alex Nevill	TBA
Graves Motorsport	27	(United Kingdom) Alfie Glenie	TBA
Performancetek Racing	14	(United Kingdom) Dominic Wheatley	TBA
Lee Pearce Racing	23	(United Kingdom) Lee Pearce	TBA
Lee Pearce Racing	711	(United Kingdom) Clark Wells	TBA
AReeve Motorsport	30	(United Kingdom) James Parker	TBA
AReeve Motorsport	61	(United Kingdom) Harry Nunn	TBA
AReeve Motorsport	80	(United Kingdom) Archie O'Brien	TBA
Mad4Mini Motorsport	38	(United Kingdom) Morgan Wroot	TBA
Mad4Mini Motorsport	66	(United Kingdom) Andrew Ringland	TBA
Mannpower Motorsport	46	(United Kingdom) Paul Manning	TBA
Elite Motorsport	49	(United Kingdom) Martin Poole	TBA
College of West Anglia	51	(United Kingdom) Andy Langley	TBA
College of West Anglia	53	(United Kingdom) Neal Clarke	TBA
College of West Anglia	54	(United Kingdom) Adrian Norman	TBA
Misty Racing	77	(United Kingdom) Alexander Jay	TBA
Privateer	82	(United Kingdom) Lydia Walmsley	TBA

== Results ==
=== JCW Class ===
Round		Circuit	Pole position	Fastest lap	Winning driver	Winning team
1	1	Donington Park GP	(United Kingdom) Ant Whorton-Eales	(United Kingdom) Lewis Brown	(United Kingdom) Ant Whorton-Eales	JamSport Racing
1	2	Donington Park GP		(United Kingdom) Ant Whorton-Eales	(United Kingdom) Nathan Harrison	Excelr8 Motorsport
1	3	Donington Park GP		(United Kingdom) Kyle Reid	(United Kingdom) Max Coates	Elite Motorsport
2	4	Knockhill Racing Circuit	(United Kingdom) Joe Tanner	(United Kingdom) Max Bird	(United Kingdom) Max Bird	Elite Motorsport
2	5	Knockhill Racing Circuit		(United Kingdom) Nathan Harrison	(United Kingdom) Max Bird	Elite Motorsport
2	6	Knockhill Racing Circuit		(United Kingdom) Nathan Harrison	(United Kingdom) Lewis Brown	Lawrence Davey Racing
3	7	Silverstone National	(United Kingdom) Nathan Harrison	(United Kingdom) Dan Zelos	(United Kingdom) Nathan Harrison	Excelr8 Motorsport
3	8	Silverstone National		(United Kingdom) Callum Newsham	(United Kingdom) Ant Whorton-Eales	JamSport Racing
3	9	Silverstone National		(United Kingdom) Isaac Smith	(United Kingdom) Tom Rawlings	JamSport Racing
4	10	Snetterton 300	(United Kingdom) Nathan Harrison	(United Kingdom) Nathan Harrison	(United Kingdom) Nathan Harrison	Excelr8 Motorsport
4	11	Snetterton 300		(United Kingdom) Nathan Harrison	(United Kingdom) Isaac Smith	Excelr8 Motorsport
5	12	Brands Hatch Indy	(United Kingdom) Max Coates	(United Kingdom) Max Bird	(United Kingdom) Max Bird	Elite Motorsport
5	13	Brands Hatch Indy		(United Kingdom) Nathan Harrison	(United Kingdom) Lewis Brown	Lawrence Davey Racing

== Championship standings ==
Scoring system

Championship points were awarded for the all finishing positions in each Championship Race. Entries were required to complete 75% of the winning car's race distance in order to be classified and earn points. There were bonus points awarded for Pole Position and Fastest Lap.

Championship Race points

Position	1st	2nd	3rd	4th	5th	6th	7th	8th	9th	10th	11th	12th	13th	14th	15th	16th	17th	18th	19th	20th+	PP	FL
Points	50	44	40	37	34	32	30	28	26	25	24	23	22	21	20	19	18	17	16	15	6	6

=== Drivers' Championship ===
==== JCW Class ====
Pos	Driver	DON			KNO			SIL			SNE		BHI		Total	Drop	Pen.	Pts
1	(United Kingdom) Nathan Harrison	2	1	Ret	Ret	11	4	1	3	5	1	14	2	8	465			465
2	(United Kingdom) Dan Zelos	4	2	6	8	3	3	2	Ret	11	2	5	3	2	457	24		433
3	(United Kingdom) Ant Whorton-Eales	1	6	3	4	4	Ret	3	1	7	6	Ret	4	7	427			427
4	(United Kingdom) Max Bird	9	16	7	1	1	Ret	6	4	8	14	8	1	6	418	19		399
5	(United Kingdom) Lewis Brown	3	3	5	7	8	1	Ret	Ret	18	3	10	8	1	384			384
6	(United Kingdom) Max Coates	6	5	1	6	21	5	10	5	4	7	2	5	4	444	40	30	374
7	(United Kingdom) Tom Rawlings	10	4	4	3	12	Ret	14	8	1	5	3	11	Ret	360			360
8	(United Kingdom) Isaac Smith	13	12	Ret	2	5	2	4	2	10	9	1	23	12	394	15	30	349
9	(United Kingdom) Callum Newsham	11	10	10	13	13	Ret	11	9	2	16	11	6	3	336	21		315
10	(United Kingdom) Jack Davidson	5	17	8	5	2	6	7	Ret	DNS	8	4	9	11	336		30	306
11	(United Kingdom) Ronan Pearson	16	15	Ret	11	10	8	9	7	3	12	9	16	18	302	18		284
12	(United Kingdom) Jason Lockwood	7	8	Ret	9	6	13	5	6	6	4	7	14	10	353	22	50	281
13	(United Kingdom) James MacIntyre	12	9	9	18	15	Ret	16	14	15	27	13	7	5	274	15		259
14	(United Kingdom) Robbie Dalgleish	17	13	Ret	14	9	7	12	17	12	22	12	12	13	267	15		252
15	(United Kingdom) Josh Stanton	14	11	17	17	17	14	17	13	Ret	18	Ret	13	20	218			218
16	(United Kingdom) Brad Hutchison	Ret	23	13	19	Ret	10	19	11	9	10	Ret	15	15	211			211
17	(United Kingdom) Matthew Wilson	19	21	16	21	20	9	24	20	17	17	Ret	17	Ret	193			193
18	(United Kingdom) James Griffith	24	19	Ret				15	12	16	24	16	19	14	167			167
19	(United Kingdom) Ryan Faulconbridge	18	18	14	16	22	12	22	19	22	23	19	21	19	222	30	30	162
20	(United Kingdom) Kyle Reid	8	7	2	12	7	Ret								161			161
21	(United Kingdom) William Newnham	15	14	11	20	18	Ret	8	10	13	19	Ret			190		30	160
22	(United Kingdom) Billy Hardy	Ret	24	19	22	Ret	16	21	Ret	21	Ret	18	20	17	148			148
23	(United Kingdom) Hannah Chapman				15	14	Ret	18	15	14			18	16	137			137
24	(United Kingdom) Steve King				23	19	15	23	21	20	26	Ret			111			111
25	(United Kingdom) Neil Trotter	22	26	Ret	25	23	Ret	Ret	DNS	DNS	25	17	22	Ret	109			109
26	(United Kingdom) Ethan Hammerton	21	28	Ret	24	16	18	13	Ret	Ret					103			103
27	(United Kingdom) Stuart Gibbs	23	27	18	Ret	24	17								80			80
28	(United Kingdom) Liam Lambert										15	Ret	10	9	71			71
29	(United Kingdom) Ryan Dignan	20	25	15							21	Ret			66			66
30	(United Kingdom) Joe Tanner				7	Ret	11								60			60
31	(United Kingdom) Oliver Barker										11	6			56			56
32	(United Kingdom) Lewis Galer	Ret	20	12				Ret	18	19					71		20	51
33	(Serbia) Neb Bursac							20	16	DSQ	20	Ret			51		40	11
34	(United Kingdom) Calum King	Ret	22	Ret	Ret	DNS	Ret	Ret	Ret	DNS	13	15			59		50	9
Pos	Driver	DON			KNO			SIL			SNE		BHI		Total	Drop	Pen.	Pts

Colour	Result
Gold	Winner
Silver	Second place
Bronze	Third place
Green	Points classification
Blue	Non-points classification
Blue	Non-classified finish (NC)
Purple	Retired, not classified (Ret)
Red	Did not qualify (DNQ)
Red	Did not pre-qualify (DNPQ)
Black	Disqualified (DSQ)
White	Did not start (DNS)
White	Withdrew (WD)
White	Race cancelled (C)
Blank	Did not practice (DNP)
Blank	Did not arrive (DNA)
Blank	Excluded (EX)
