= 2019 Mini Challenge UK =

Motor racing competition

The 2019 Mini Challenge season was the eighteenth season of the Mini Challenge UK. The season started on 20 April at Oulton Park and ended on 20 October at Snetterton Motor Racing Circuit. The season featured thirteen rounds across the UK.

== Entry list ==
Team	No.	Driver	Rounds
JCW Class
Team HARD	2	(United Kingdom) Ben Palmer	All
JamSport Racing	5	(United Kingdom) James Griffith	2–8
JamSport Racing	45	(United Kingdom) Calum King	1–3, 5
JamSport Racing	46	(United Kingdom) Stuart Gibbs	All
JamSport Racing	56	(United Kingdom) Harry Gooding	All
JamSport Racing	85	(United Kingdom) Steve King	1–3, 8
JamSport Racing	88	(United Kingdom) Tom Rawlings	All
JamSport Racing	777	(United Kingdom) Kenan Dole	All
Excelr8 Motorsport	7	(United Kingdom) Jac Maybin	1–5
Excelr8 Motorsport	11	(United Kingdom) Sam Weller	2–3, 7
Excelr8 Motorsport	11	(United Kingdom) Stephen James	8
Excelr8 Motorsport	19	(Australia) Jacob Andrews	1–4
Excelr8 Motorsport	20	(United Kingdom) Richard Newman	All
Excelr8 Motorsport	36	(United Kingdom) William Newnham	5–8
Excelr8 Motorsport	51	(United Kingdom) Gilbert Yates	3
Excelr8 Motorsport	77	(United Kingdom) Lewis Galer	All
Excelr8 Motorsport	99	(United Kingdom) Josh Stanton	All
AutoTech Motorsport	9	(United Kingdom) Billy Hardy	2, 5–7
MINI UK VIP	12	(United Kingdom) Rory Cuff	All
MINI UK VIP	27	(United Kingdom) Nathan Harrison	All
MINI UK VIP	131	(Portugal) Jorge Calado	1
MINI UK VIP	131	(United Kingdom) Sam Sheehan	3
MINI UK VIP	131	(United Kingdom) Johnathan Benson	6
MINI UK VIP	445	(United Kingdom) Dan Zelos	All
Lawrence Davey Racing	16	(United Kingdom) Callum Newsham	All
Lawrence Davey Racing	39	(United Kingdom) Lewis Brown	All
Lawrence Davey Racing	44	(United Kingdom) Max Bird	All
Lawrence Davey Racing	112	(United Kingdom) Neal Trotter	All
Privateer	17	(United Kingdom) Brad Hutchison	5–8
Privateer	18	(United Kingdom) James Gornall	All
Privateer	47	(United Kingdom) James MacIntyre	All
Privateer	69	(United Kingdom) Lee Pattison	1–4, 6–7
Privateer	84	(United Kingdom) Ryan Dignan	2–3, 7–8
Privateer	90	(United Kingdom) Scott Jeffs	5
Lux Motorsport	21	(United Kingdom) Jack Davidson	All
Lux Motorsport	24	(United Kingdom) Matthew Rainbow	4
Lux Motorsport	24	(United Kingdom) Kyle Reid	5
JWB Motorsport	31	(United Kingdom) Matt Wilson	All
JWB Motorsport	52	(United Kingdom) Ruaridh Clark	8
OX4 Racing	35	(United Kingdom) James Loukes	All
Cooper S Class
Privateer	5	(United Kingdom) Chloe Hewitt	3
Privateer	23	(United Kingdom) Dan Butcher-Lord	All
Privateer	70	(United Kingdom) Oly Mortimer	4
Privateer	211	(United Kingdom) Angus Tosh	4
Privateer	231	(United Kingdom) Steve Webb	1–3, 5–7
Privateer	666	(United Kingdom) Sami Bowler	All
AReeve Motorsport	7	(United Kingdom) Steve Williams	1-3
AReeve Motorsport	21	(United Kingdom) Keir McConomy	All
AReeve Motorsport	24	(United Kingdom) Rob Austin	All
AReeve Motorsport	26	(United Kingdom) Aaron Reeve	3
AReeve Motorsport	190	(United Kingdom) Alan Lee	2–3, 5–7
Mad4Mini Motorsport	12	(United Kingdom) Stuart McLaren	All
Mad4Mini Motorsport	44	(United Kingdom) Andy Montgomery	2, 6
Cooper Pro Class
Lawrence Davey Racing	1	(United Kingdom) Alex Nevill	All
AReeve Motorsport	2	(United Kingdom) James Hillery	All
Lux Motorsport	8	(United Kingdom) Hannah Chapman	All
Rob Sims Racing	9	(United Kingdom) Simon Walton	2
Rob Sims Racing	47	(United Kingdom) James Goodall	1–6
Privateer	14	(United Kingdom) Dominic Wheatley	All
Privateer	49	(United Kingdom) Martin Poole	1, 3
Privateer	82	(United Kingdom) Lydia Walmsley	All
Privateer	91	(United Kingdom) Robbie Dalgleish	All
Mad4Mini Motorsport	38	(United Kingdom) Morgan Wroot	1-6
College of West Anglia	77	(United Kingdom) Andy Mollison	6
Excelr8 Motorsport	85	(United Kingdom) Toby Goodman	All
Cooper Am Class
AReeve Motorsport	4	(United Kingdom) Mike Paul	All
AReeve Motorsport	30	(United Kingdom) James Parker	2–4, 6–7
AReeve Motorsport	80	(United Kingdom) Archie O'Brien	All
AReeve Motorsport	154	(United Kingdom) Lawrence Harris	1, 3, 6
Privateer	23	(United Kingdom) Lee Pearce	All
Privateer	46	(United Kingdom) Paul Manning	All
Privateer	89	(United Kingdom) Josh Martin	All
Excelr8 Motorsport	36	(United Kingdom) Mark Cornell	1–5, 7
Excelr8 Motorsport	94	(United Kingdom) Josh Porter	None
College of West Anglia	50	(United Kingdom) Andrew Langley	6–7
College of West Anglia	51	(United Kingdom) Neal Clarke	6–7
College of West Anglia	54	(United Kingdom) Adrian Norman	All
Mad4Mini Motorsport	63	(United Kingdom) Darryl Brown	1, 7
Mad4Mini Motorsport	66	(United Kingdom) Andrew Ringland	All

== Calendar ==
Round	Circuit	Date	Classes	Races
1	Oulton Park International	20, 22 April	JCW	2
2	Snetterton 300	11–12 May	Cooper S, Cooper Pro, Cooper Am	2
3	Snetterton 300	18–19 May	JCW	2
4	Silverstone GP	8–9 June	JCW	2
5	Oulton Park Island	15 June	Cooper S, Cooper Pro, Cooper Am	2
6	Donington Park GP	22–23 June	JCW	2
7	Brands Hatch Indy	20–21 July	All	3
8	Brands Hatch GP	3–4 August	JCW	2
9	Croft Circuit	17–18 August	Cooper S, Cooper Pro, Cooper Am	2
10	Cadwell Park	7 September	Cooper S, Cooper Pro, Cooper Am	2
11	Donington Park GP	14–15 September	JCW	2
12	Donington Park National	28–29 September	Cooper S, Cooper Pro, Cooper Am	3
13	Snetterton 300	19–20 October	All	2

== Results ==
=== JCW Class ===
Round		Circuit	Pole position	Fastest lap	Winning driver	Winning team
1	1	Oulton Park International	(United Kingdom) Dan Zelos	(United Kingdom) James Gornall	(United Kingdom) James Gornall	Privateer
1	2	Oulton Park International		(United Kingdom) Ben Palmer	(United Kingdom) Jac Maybin	Excelr8 Motorsport
2	3	Snetterton 300	(United Kingdom) James Gornall	(United Kingdom) James Gornall	(United Kingdom) James Gornall	Privateer
2	4	Snetterton 300		(United Kingdom) James Gornall	(United Kingdom) Jack Davidson	Lux Motorsport
3	5	Silverstone GP	(United Kingdom) James Gornall	(United Kingdom) Jac Maybin	(United Kingdom) Ben Palmer	Team HARD
3	6	Silverstone GP		(United Kingdom) Nathan Harrison	(United Kingdom) Ben Palmer	Team HARD
4	7	Donington Park GP	(United Kingdom) Nathan Harrison	(United Kingdom) Nathan Harrison	(United Kingdom) Nathan Harrison	MINI UK VIP
4	8	Donington Park GP		(United Kingdom) Dan Zelos	(United Kingdom) Nathan Harrison	MINI UK VIP
5	9	Brands Hatch Indy	(United Kingdom) Dan Zelos	(United Kingdom) Dan Zelos	(United Kingdom) James Gornall	Privateer
5	10	Brands Hatch Indy		(United Kingdom) Dan Zelos	(United Kingdom) Nathan Harrison	MINI UK VIP
5	11	Brands Hatch Indy		(United Kingdom) Nathan Harrison	(United Kingdom) Ben Palmer	Team HARD.
6	12	Brands Hatch GP	(United Kingdom) Dan Zelos	(United Kingdom) Dan Zelos	(United Kingdom) Dan Zelos	MINI UK VIP
6	13	Brands Hatch GP		(United Kingdom) Nathan Harrison	(United Kingdom) James Gornall	Privateer
7	14	Donington Park GP	(United Kingdom) James Gornall	(United Kingdom) Nathan Harrison	(United Kingdom) James Gornall	Privateer
7	15	Donington Park GP		(United Kingdom) James Gornall	(United Kingdom) Dan Zelos	MINI UK VIP
8	16	Snetterton 300	(United Kingdom) Nathan Harrison	(United Kingdom) James Gornall	(United Kingdom) Nathan Harrison	MINI UK VIP
8	17	Snetterton 300		(United Kingdom) Nathan Harrison	(United Kingdom) Nathan Harrison	MINI UK VIP

=== Cooper S Class ===
Round		Circuit	Pole position	Fastest lap	Winning driver	Winning team
1	1	Snetterton 300	(United Kingdom) Dan Butcher-Lloyd	(United Kingdom) Stuart McLaren	(United Kingdom) Dan Butcher-Lloyd	Privateer
1	2	Snetterton 300		(United Kingdom) Rob Austin	(United Kingdom) Rob Austin	AReeve Motorsport
2	3	Oulton Park International	(United Kingdom) Dan Butcher-Lloyd	(United Kingdom) Dan Butcher-Lloyd	(United Kingdom) Dan Butcher-Lloyd	Privateer
2	4	Oulton Park International		(United Kingdom) Dan Butcher-Lloyd	(United Kingdom) Dan Butcher-Lloyd	Privateer
3	5	Brands Hatch Indy	(United Kingdom) Dan Butcher-Lloyd	(United Kingdom) Dan Butcher-Lloyd	(United Kingdom) Dan Butcher-Lloyd	Privateer
3	6	Brands Hatch Indy		(United Kingdom) Dan Butcher-Lloyd	(United Kingdom) Dan Butcher-Lloyd	Privateer
3	7	Brands Hatch Indy		(United Kingdom) Rob Austin	(United Kingdom) Dan Butcher-Lloyd	Privateer
4	8	Croft Circuit	(United Kingdom) Rob Austin	(United Kingdom) Rob Austin	(United Kingdom) Rob Austin	AReeve Motorsport
4	9	Croft Circuit		(United Kingdom) Rob Austin	(United Kingdom) Rob Austin	AReeve Motorsport
5	10	Cadwell Park	(United Kingdom) Rob Austin	(United Kingdom) Rob Austin	(United Kingdom) Dan Butcher-Lloyd	Privateer
5	11	Cadwell Park		(United Kingdom) Dan Butcher-Lloyd	(United Kingdom) Dan Butcher-Lloyd	Privateer
6	12	Donington Park National	(United Kingdom) Dan Butcher-Lloyd	(United Kingdom) Dan Butcher-Lloyd	(United Kingdom) Rob Austin	AReeve Motorsport
6	13	Donington Park National		(United Kingdom) Dan Butcher-Lloyd	(United Kingdom) Dan Butcher-Lloyd	Privateer
6	14	Donington Park National		(United Kingdom) Rob Austin	(United Kingdom) Dan Butcher-Lloyd	Privateer
7	15	Snetterton 300	(United Kingdom) Dan Butcher-Lloyd	(United Kingdom) Dan Butcher-Lloyd	(United Kingdom) Dan Butcher-Lloyd	Privateer
7	16	Snetterton 300		(United Kingdom) Dan Butcher-Lloyd	(United Kingdom) Dan Butcher-Lloyd	Privateer

=== Cooper Pro Class ===
Round		Circuit	Pole position	Fastest lap	Winning driver	Winning team
1	1	Snetterton 300	(United Kingdom) Toby Goodman	(United Kingdom) James Goodall	(United Kingdom) Robert Dalgleish	Privateer
1	2	Snetterton 300		(United Kingdom) Toby Goodman	(United Kingdom) Martin Poole	Privateer
2	3	Oulton Park International	(United Kingdom) Toby Goodman	(United Kingdom) Robert Dalgleish	(United Kingdom) Toby Goodman	Excelr8 Motorsport
2	4	Oulton Park International		(United Kingdom) Toby Goodman	(United Kingdom) Robert Dalgleish	Privateer
3	5	Brands Hatch Indy	(United Kingdom) Toby Goodman	(United Kingdom) Robert Dalgleish	(United Kingdom) Toby Goodman	Excelr8 Motorsport
3	6	Brands Hatch Indy		(United Kingdom) Hannah Chapman	(United Kingdom) Robert Dalgleish	Privateer
3	7	Brands Hatch Indy		(United Kingdom) Alex Nevill	(United Kingdom) Toby Goodman	Excelr8 Motorsport
4	8	Croft Circuit	(United Kingdom) Robert Dalgleish	(United Kingdom) Dominic Wheatley	(United Kingdom) Robert Dalgleish	Privateer
4	9	Croft Circuit		(United Kingdom) Toby Goodman	(United Kingdom) Toby Goodman	Excelr8 Motorsport
5	10	Cadwell Park	(United Kingdom) Toby Goodman	(United Kingdom) Robert Dalgleish	(United Kingdom) Toby Goodman	Excelr8 Motorsport
5	11	Cadwell Park		(United Kingdom) Toby Goodman	(United Kingdom) Robert Dalgleish	Privateer
6	12	Donington Park National	(United Kingdom) Robert Dalgleish	(United Kingdom) Toby Goodman	(United Kingdom) Robert Dalgleish	Privateer
6	13	Donington Park National		(United Kingdom) James Goodall	(United Kingdom) Toby Goodman	Excelr8 Motorsport
6	14	Donington Park National		(United Kingdom) Hannah Chapman	(United Kingdom) Toby Goodman	Excelr8 Motorsport
7	15	Snetterton 300	(United Kingdom) Robert Dalgleish	(United Kingdom) Toby Goodman	(United Kingdom) Dominic Wheatley	Privateer
7	16	Snetterton 300		(United Kingdom) Toby Goodman	(United Kingdom) Lydia Walmsley	Privateer

=== Cooper Am Class ===
Round		Circuit	Pole position	Fastest lap	Winning driver	Winning team
1	1	Snetterton 300	(United Kingdom) Josh Porter	(United Kingdom) Josh Martin	(United Kingdom) Paul Manning	Privateer
1	2	Snetterton 300		(United Kingdom) Josh Porter	(United Kingdom) Paul Manning	Privateer
2	3	Oulton Park International	(United Kingdom) Josh Porter	(United Kingdom) Josh Porter	(United Kingdom) Lee Pearce	Privateer
2	4	Oulton Park International		(United Kingdom) Paul Manning	(United Kingdom) Paul Manning	Privateer
3	5	Brands Hatch Indy	(United Kingdom) Lee Pearce	(United Kingdom) Lee Pearce	(United Kingdom) Lee Pearce	Privateer
3	6	Brands Hatch Indy		(United Kingdom) Josh Porter	(United Kingdom) Lee Pearce	Privateer
3	7	Brands Hatch Indy		(United Kingdom) Paul Manning	(United Kingdom) Lee Pearce	Privateer
4	8	Croft Circuit	(United Kingdom) Lee Pearce	(United Kingdom) Paul Manning	(United Kingdom) Paul Manning	Privateer
4	9	Croft Circuit		(United Kingdom) Lee Pearce	(United Kingdom) Josh Porter	Excelr8 Motorsport
5	10	Cadwell Park	(United Kingdom) Josh Porter	(United Kingdom) Lee Pearce	(United Kingdom) Lee Pearce	Privateer
5	11	Cadwell Park		(United Kingdom) Archie O'Brien	(United Kingdom) Josh Porter	Excelr8 Motorsport
6	12	Donington Park National	(United Kingdom) Archie O'Brien	(United Kingdom) Andrew Langley	(United Kingdom) Lee Pearce	Privateer
6	13	Donington Park National		(United Kingdom) Lawrence Harris	(United Kingdom) Lee Pearce	Privateer
6	14	Donington Park National		(United Kingdom) Josh Porter	(United Kingdom) Archie O'Brien	AReeve Motorsport
7	15	Snetterton 300	(United Kingdom) Josh Porter	(United Kingdom) Lee Pearce	(United Kingdom) Archie O'Brien	AReeve Motorsport
7	16	Snetterton 300		(United Kingdom) Mark Cornell	(United Kingdom) Andrew Langley	College of West Anglia

== Championship standings ==
Scoring system

Championship points were awarded for the first 34 positions in each Championship Race. Entries were required to complete 75% of the winning car's race distance in order to be classified and earn points. There were bonus points awarded for Pole Position where bonus points are awarded to the 6 fastest laps in and will score points from 6 to 1 in the order 6–5–4–3–2–1 and Fastest Lap where bonus points are awarded to the 6 fastest laps in and will score points from 6 to 1 in the order 6–5–4–3–2–1.

Championship Race points

Position	1st	2nd	3rd	4th	5th	6th	7th	8th	9th	10th	11th	12th	13th	14th	15th	16th	17th	18th	19th	20th	21st	22nd	23rd	24th	25th	26th	27th	28th	29th	30th	31st	32nd	33rd	34th	PP	FL
Points	50	44	40	37	34	32	30	28	26	24	22	21	20	19	18	17	16	15	14	13	12	11	10	9	8	7	6	5	4	3	2	1	1	1	6	6

=== Drivers' Championship ===
==== JCW Class ====
Pos	Driver	OUL		SNE		SIL		DON		BHI			BHGP		DON		SNE		PP	FL	Total	Drop	Pts
1	(United Kingdom) James Gornall	1	2	1	3	3	Ret	2	4	1	2	5	5	1	1	2	3	2	38	60	793		793
2	(United Kingdom) Nathan Harrison	2	3	2	2	23	2	1	1	3	1	4	2	3	2	21	1	1	31	76	804	13	791
3	(United Kingdom) Dan Zelos	8	4	3	5	4	3	3	2	2	3	3	1	4	4	1	4	Ret	32	58	725	28	697
4	(United Kingdom) Ben Palmer	Ret	13	4	4	1	1	6	5	5	4	1	6	8	11	3	2	6	15	43	637	20	617
5	(United Kingdom) Lewis Brown	Ret	12	5	6	16	15	5	3	4	5	17	12	9	3	10	7	4	14	32	507	16	491
6	(United Kingdom) Rory Cuff	Ret	14	14	15	10	5	7	8	6	6	2	7	16	8	20	8	3	4	14	456	13	443
7	(United Kingdom) James Loukes	14	9	11	8	DSQ	17	12	12	8	8	8	9	12	6	5	9	Ret	5	3	384	16	368
8	(United Kingdom) Tom Rawlings	15	21	19	17	5	4	8	7	10	9	7	Ret	13	9	Ret	Ret	6		6	355		355
9	(United Kingdom) Harry Gooding	13	15	12	7	9	Ret	10	11	Ret	15	10	4	6	Ret	13	6	11	1	2	349		349
10	(United Kingdom) Max Bird	5	Ret	22	Ret	12	6	Ret	18	12	20	11	10	5	5	6	5	Ret	6	4	337		337
11	(United Kingdom) Callum Newsham	11	8	10	Ret	8	12	11	9	13	12	14	Ret	15	15	15	14	8		2	334		334
12	(United Kingdom) James MacIntyre	18	16	18	17	6	10	15	15	9	10	13	Ret	Ret	14	11	11	9	1	2	317		317
13	(United Kingdom) Jack Davidson	22	Ret	8	1	Ret	8	Ret	13	7	7	6	20	Ret	Ret	4	EX	EX	2	9	290		290
14	(United Kingdom) Kenan Dole	7	6	9	12	13	9	Ret	17	Ret	17	Ret	15	10	Ret	9	10	Ret		1	280		280
15	(United Kingdom) Lee Pattison	6	Ret	6	15	11	Ret	Ret	10				3	2	7	Ret			9	19	270		270
16	(United Kingdom) Lewis Galer	12	10	21	14	14	13	20	16	14	18	19	21	11	17	Ret	18	12			279	12	267
17	(United Kingdom) Jac Maybin	3	1	Ret	DNS	2	Ret	4	6	Ret	21	12							9	20	265		265
18	(United Kingdom) Matthew Wilson	19	18	15	Ret	17	14	9	14	15	Ret	18	11	Ret	13	16	17	14			254		254
19	(United Kingdom) Richard Newman	9	7	Ret	11	Ret	16	Ret	Ret	16	13	16	8	7	Ret	Ret	15	16		1	243		243
20	(United Kingdom) Josh Stanton	16	17	23	18	24	18	16	Ret	21	23	23	16	20	16	Ret	20	18			206		206
21	(United Kingdom) Neal Trotter	20	20	25	Ret	22	19	17	19	19	16	24	14	19	19	Ret	24	15			203		203
22	(United Kingdom) James Griffith			17	16	20	21	13	Ret	Ret	Ret	21	13	14	Ret	14	25	17			172		172
23	(United Kingdom) Brad Hutchison									11	11	9	Ret	Ret	12	8	13	7			169		169
24	(United Kingdom) Calum King	4	5	7	20	21	Ret			20	Ret	Ret							1	5	145		145
25	(United Kingdom) Sam Weller			13	Ret	7	7								10	7				5	139		139
26	(United Kingdom) Stuart Gibbs	Ret	19	27	22	Ret	Ret	19	22	18	19	20	18	Ret	Ret	19	21	Ret			139		139
27	(Australia) Jacob Andrews	10	11	20	Ret	15	11	14	20												131		131
28	(United Kingdom) Ryan Dignan			16	10	Ret	20								Ret	12	12	10			120		120
29	(United Kingdom) William Newnham									17	14	15	17	Ret	18	18	16	Ret			116		116
30	(United Kingdom) Steve King	21	22	26	19	Ret	Ret										22	19			69		69
31	(United Kingdom) Billy Hardy			24	21					Ret	Ret	Ret	Ret	18	20	17					65		65
32	(United Kingdom) Scott Jeffs									22	22	22									33		33
33	(United Kingdom) Stephen James																23	13			30		30
34	(United Kingdom) Johnathan Benson												19	17							30		30
35	(United Kingdom) Matthew Rainbow							18	21												27		27
36	(Portugal) Jorge Calado	17	Ret																		16		16
37	(United Kingdom) Gilbert Yates					18	Ret														15		15
38	(United Kingdom) Sam Sheehan					19	Ret														14		14
39	(United Kingdom) Ruaridh Clark																19	Ret			14		14
40	(United Kingdom) Kyle Reid									Ret	Ret	Ret									0		0
Pos	Driver	OUL		SNE		SIL		DON		BHI			BHGP		DON		SNE		PP	FL	Total	Drop	Pts

Colour	Result
Gold	Winner
Silver	Second place
Bronze	Third place
Green	Points classification
Blue	Non-points classification
Blue	Non-classified finish (NC)
Purple	Retired, not classified (Ret)
Red	Did not qualify (DNQ)
Red	Did not pre-qualify (DNPQ)
Black	Disqualified (DSQ)
White	Did not start (DNS)
White	Withdrew (WD)
White	Race cancelled (C)
Blank	Did not practice (DNP)
Blank	Did not arrive (DNA)
Blank	Excluded (EX)
