= Max Bird (racing driver) =

British racing driver (born 2000)

- Nationality: (United Kingdom) British
- Born: 27 May 2000 (age 26) Chichester, England
- Relatives: Paul Bird (father); Frank Bird (brother)

Mini Challenge UK career
- Debut season: 2019
- Current team: CTS Motorsport
- Years active: 2019–2021, 2026
- Former teams: Lawrence Davey Racing; Elite Motorsport; EXCELR8 Motorsport
- Starts: 52
- Wins: 6
- Podiums: 14
- Poles: 3
- Fastest laps: 5
- Best finish: 2nd in 2021

Previous series
- 2024 2023 2018 2017–2018 2016 2015: GT4 European Series; Porsche Carrera Cup Great Britain; Touring Car Endurance Series; Ginetta GT5 Challenge; Ginetta Junior Championship; Ginetta Junior Winter Series

Max Bird (born 27 May 2000) is a British racing driver and driver coach who last competed in the Mini Challenge UK for CTS Motorsport. He won the Pro-Am class of the 2023 Porsche Carrera Cup Great Britain.

== Personal life ==
His brother, Frank, is also a racing driver, competing in endurance racing.

Bird's dad, Paul, owned Paul Bird Motorsport, a motorcycle racing team. He passed away in September 2023.

== Racing career ==
=== Ginetta debut (2015) ===
Bird debuted in car racing in the latter half of 2015, competing in the Ginetta Junior Winter Series for Xentek Motorsport.

Staying full-time in the Ginetta Junior Championship for 2016, Bird would move over to Total Control Racing. He would fail to score a podium again, placing 17th, being absent for Knockhill, Silverstone and Brands Hatch.

After an unsuccessful stint in the Ginetta Junior Championship, Bird moved over to the Ginetta GT5 Challenge for the next 2 years, with Century Motorsport for both seasons. He scored a pair of 4th places in the championship, with 5 wins and 14 podiums across both years.

=== Mini Challenge UK (2019) ===
Bird moved to the Mini Challenge UK for the 2019 season, competing with Lawrence Davey Racing. Like his Ginetta Junior Championship debut season, he scored no podiums, fastest laps or pole positions. Despite this, Bird ended up 10th in the championship.

2020 saw Bird move from Lawrence Davey Racing to Elite Motorsport in their debut campaign. He managed to score 3 podiums, all of which were wins, and 3 fastest laps on course to 4th in the standings.

Bird swapped teams once more for 2021, joining EXCELR8 Motorsport. 11 podiums, including 3 wins, were recorded from Bird throughout the year, with 3 fastest laps and pole positions also. He finished 2nd overall, only behind Dan Zelos.

=== Porsche switch (2023) ===
With a brief gap year in racing, Bird returned to rear-wheel drive machinery, joining the 2023 Porsche Carrera Cup Great Britain for Redline Racing. With 3 wins and 10 podiums in the 16 races, he won the Pro-Am championship, scoring 116 points. During the season, he became an ambassador for Dementia Support.

=== Endurance debut (2024) ===
Bird joined Mahiki Racing for a stint in the GT4 European Series in 2024, partnering former BTCC driver Dexter Patterson. A horrible season came for Bird, with 5 consecutive retirements and 7 overall in their 10 races in the series. Bird and the team departed the championship prior to the finale.

=== Mini Challenge UK return (2026) ===
With no racing experience for nearly 2 years, Caterham and Ginetta team CTS Motorsport called Bird up for a return to the Mini Challenge UK in a one-off round. He did not score any podiums throughout his weekend with the team. He stepped back into a driver coach role after the weekend, coaching series debutant Viesturs Ozols at Silverstone in the car.

== Racing record ==
| Season | Series | Team | Races | Wins | Poles | F/Laps | Podiums | Points | Position |
|---|---|---|---|---|---|---|---|---|---|
| 2015 | Ginetta Junior Winter Series | Xentek Motorsport | 4 | 0 | 0 | 0 | 0 | 48 | ? |
| 2016 | Ginetta Junior Championship | Total Control Racing | 17 | 0 | 0 | 0 | 0 | 141 | 17th |
| 2017 | Ginetta GT5 Challenge | Century Motorsport | 19 | 1 | 2 | 0 | 6 | ? | 4th |
| 2018 | Ginetta GT5 Challenge | Century Motorsport | 16 | 4 | 0 | 2 | 8 | 320 | 4th |
| 2019 | Mini Challenge UK – JCW | Lawrence Davey Racing | 17 | 0 | 0 | 0 | 0 | 337 | 10th |
| 2020 | Mini Challenge UK – JCW | Elite Motorsport | 13 | 3 | 0 | 3 | 3 | 399 | 4th |
| 2021 | Mini Challenge UK – JCW | EXCELR8 Motorsport | 19 | 3 | 3 | 3 | 11 | 687 | 2nd |
| 2023 | Porsche Carrera Cup Great Britain – Pro-Am | Redline Racing | 16 | 3 | 6 | 1 | 10 | 116 | 1st |
| 2024 | GT4 European Series – Silver Cup | Mahiki Racing | 10 | 0 | 0 | 0 | 0 | 0 | 36th |
| 2026 | Mini Challenge UK – JCW | CTS Motorsport | 3 | 0 | 0 | 0 | 0 | 0 | NC |
