= 2021 Mini Challenge UK =

Motor racing competition

The 2021 Quaife Mini Challenge season was the twentieth season of the Mini Challenge UK. The season began on 12 March at Snetterton and ended on 24 October at Brands Hatch. It included nineteen rounds across the UK, all the JCW Class races and 2 of the Cooper Class races support the British Touring Car Championship.

== Entry list ==
All drivers raced under British licences.

Team	No.	Driver	Rounds
Team HARD	2	Paul Taylor	1–4
Team HARD	7	Kenan Dole	1–4, 6–7
JamSport Racing	3	Alex Denning	6
JamSport Racing	19	Bobby Thompson	6–7
LUX Motorsport	4	Liam Lambert	1–3, 5–7
LUX Motorsport	8	Hannah Chapman	All
LUX Motorsport	13	Ryan Faulconbridge	All
LUX Motorsport	21	Jack Davidson	All
LUX Motorsport	47	James MacIntyre	All
LUX Motorsport	69	Mark Dickson	4
LUX Motorsport	85	Steve King	4
LDR Performance Tuning	5	James Griffith	1–4, 6–7
LDR Performance Tuning	12	Neil Trotter	1–4, 6
LDR Performance Tuning	16	Callum Newsham	1–6
LDR Performance Tuning	39	Lewis Brown	All
LDR Performance Tuning	66	Ronan Pearson	All
LDR Performance Tuning	88	Tom Rawlings	6
LDR Performance Tuning	91	Robbie Dalgleish	1–6
Graves Motorsport	10	Bradley Gravett	All
Graves Motorsport	71	Max Coates	All
Hybrid Tune	11	Sam Weller	All
Hybrid Tune	40	Stephen James	All
MotorsportApps.com with MPHR	17	Brad Hutchison	All
Excelr8 Motorsport	19	Jack Mitchell	2
Excelr8 Motorsport	20	Kyle Reid	4
Excelr8 Motorsport	22	Oliver Barker	1–3, 5–6
Excelr8 Motorsport	23	Ethan Hammerton	All
Excelr8 Motorsport	44	Max Bird	All
Excelr8 Motorsport	45	Dan Zelos	All
Excelr8 Motorsport	63	Taylor Whitson	6–7
Excelr8 Motorsport	72	Joshua Jackson	7
Excelr8 Motorsport	315	Jason Lockwood	All
BTC Racing	24	Joe Tanner	All
BTC Racing	82	Lydia Walmsley	All
J W Bird Motorsport	31	Matthew Wilson	All
J W Bird Motorsport	52	Ru Clark	All
J W Bird Motorsport	123	Isaac Smith	1–5
OX4 Racing	35	Jim Loukes	1–3, 5–7

== Results ==
=== JCW Class ===
Round		Circuit	Date	Pole position	Fastest lap	Winning driver	Winning team
1	R1	Snetterton	12 June	Max Bird	Lewis Brown	Lewis Brown	LDR Performance Tuning
1	R2	Snetterton	13 June		Sam Weller	Lewis Brown	LDR Performance Tuning
1	R3	Snetterton	13 June		Brad Hutchison	Brad Hutchison	MotorsportApps.com with MPHR
2	R4	Brands Hatch Indy	26 June	Max Bird	Max Bird	Max Bird	Excelr8 Motorsport
2	R5	Brands Hatch Indy	27 June		Max Bird	Max Coates	Graves Motorsport
2	R6	Brands Hatch Indy	27 June		Dan Zelos	Dan Zelos	Excelr8 Motorsport
3	R7	Oulton Park	31 July	Max Bird	Dan Zelos	Max Bird	Excelr8 Motorsport
3	R8	Oulton Park	1 August		Jason Lockwood	Oliver Barker	Excelr8 Motorsport
4	R9	Knockhill	14 August	Dan Zelos	Dan Zelos	Dan Zelos	Excelr8 Motorsport
4	R10	Knockhill	15 August		Dan Zelos	Dan Zelos	Excelr8 Motorsport
4	R11	Knockhill	15 August		Jason Lockwood	Jack Davidson	LUX Motorsport
5	R12	Croft	18 September	Jack Davidson	Dan Zelos	Dan Zelos	Excelr8 Motorsport
5	R13	Croft	19 September		Max Bird	Isaac Smith	J W Bird Motorsport
6	R14	Donington Park	9 October	Max Coates	James MacIntyre	Jack Davidson	LUX Motorsport
6	R15	Donington Park	10 October		Sam Weller	Max Bird	Excelr8 Motorsport
6	R16	Donington Park	10 October		Lewis Brown	Jack Davidson	LUX Motorsport
7	R17	Brands Hatch GP	23 October	Lewis Brown	Lewis Brown	Lewis Brown	LDR Performance Tuning
7	R18	Brands Hatch GP	24 October		Lewis Brown	Lewis Brown	LDR Performance Tuning
7	R19	Brands Hatch GP	24 October		Max Coates	Max Coates	Graves Motorsport

== Championship standings ==
Scoring system

Championship points were awarded for the all finishing positions in each Championship Race. Entries were required to complete 75% of the winning car's race distance in order to be classified and earn points. There were bonus points awarded for Pole Position and Fastest Lap.

Championship Race points

Position	1st	2nd	3rd	4th	5th	6th	7th	8th	9th	10th	11th	12th	13th	14th	15th	16th	17th	18th	19th	20th+	PP	FL
Points	50	44	40	37	34	32	30	28	26	25	24	23	22	21	20	19	18	17	16	15	6	6

=== Drivers' Championship ===
==== JCW Class ====
Pos	Driver	SNE			BHI			OUL		KNO			CRO		DON			BHGP			Total	Drop	Pen.	Points
1	Dan Zelos	5	5	4	7	2	1	2	3	1	1	5	1	5	7	8	6	5	4	2	782	58	30	694
2	Max Bird	2	3	10	1	Ret	8	1	6	5	3	3	4	7	3	1	2	3	3	5	738	31	20	687
3	Lewis Brown	1	1	8	4	13	6	8	5	11	NC	18	3	Ret	9	6	3	1	1	7	624			624
4	Jack Davidson	4	4	26	18	10	3	12	7	4	2	1	2	4	1	2	1	Ret	7	3	659	15	20	624
5	Max Coates	Ret	24	25	3	1	5	4	4	8	7	4	5	2	5	3	NC	7	5	1	610			610
6	Sam Weller	3	2	7	12	5	28	7	2	6	5	7	9	Ret	2	4	4	2	9	4	622	15		607
7	Jason Lockwood	Ret	14	9	10	6	26	3	9	2	4	2	23	14	10	7	20	19	12	8	502	15		487
8	Ronan Pearson	13	7	2	17	12	7	14	12	12	10	11	8	6	4	5	Ret	11	8	6	503	19		484
9	James MacIntyre	9	Ret	18	5	3	2	13	11	13	22	17	12	Ret	26	15	8	16	13	9	433			433
10	Ethan Hammerton	8	6	6	14	11	11	15	10	9	6	6	11	Ret	13	25	14	14	Ret	14	424			424
11	Ru Clark	25	18	17	13	16	12	19	13	19	12	10	7	3	18	11	7	9	10	11	441	31		410
12	Brad Hutchison	11	9	1	19	15	14	10	22	14	11	13	14	15	15	10	9	8	11	10	467	32	40	395
13	Isaac Smith	6	8	5	16	8	17	9	8	10	8	Ret	6	1							349			349
14	Kenan Dole	12	Ret	Ret	6	9	9	Ret	17	17	15	16			14	26	12	6	6	16	334			334
15	Joe Tanner	16	12	13	15	24	27	11	Ret	3	9	8	Ret	DNS	11	12	Ret	Ret	19	12	322			322
16	Bradley Gravett	14	11	23	27	Ret	21	18	15	Ret	18	25	21	12	21	19	17	12	20	Ret	293			293
17	Stephen James	19	21	19	24	17	18	24	18	23	Ret	19	22	17	25	18	10	20	22	18	305	15		290
18	Robbie Dalgleish	7	Ret	15	8	7	10	Ret	16	18	21	12	10	8	12	Ret	Ret				287			287
19	Hannah Chapman	20	19	20	NC	25	20	26	23	15	13	20	16	16	19	20	Ret	22	23	23	282			282
20	Jim Loukes	15	10	3	9	Ret	15	6	Ret				13	Ret	6	17	Ret	Ret	17	15	280			280
21	Matthew Wilson	18	22	22	Ret	19	19	16	14	16	16	15	DNS	DNS	22	16	16	17	Ret	19	273			273
22	Lydia Walmsley	24	20	21	26	26	23	17	19	Ret	DNS	DNS	20	11	Ret	23	18	10	14	22	260			260
23	Ryan Faulconbridge	21	17	14	22	23	25	22	21	Ret	Ret	23	18	13	16	27	Ret	21	Ret	21	248			248
24	James Griffith	17	Ret	Ret	23	18	Ret	25	20	21	17	21			23	24	15	18	18	17	237			237
25	Oliver Barker	10	Ret	16	21	14	13	5	1				15	10	20	DNS	DNS				247		30	217
26	Callum Newsham	Ret	15	12	20	20	16	Ret	Ret	7	Ret	14	19	Ret	8	Ret	Ret				189			189
27	Liam Lambert	Ret	13	11	Ret	4	4	20	Ret				17	9	Ret	22	13	13	15	13	310		140	170
28	Paul Taylor	22	23	24	28	21	24	21	Ret	22	20	22									152			152
29	Neil Trotter	23	16	Ret	25	22	Ret	23	24	DSQ	DSQ	DSQ			24	21	DNS				126		120	6
Guest drivers ineligible for points
	Bobby Thompson														Ret	9	5	4	2	Ret				
	Jack Mitchell				2	DSQ	22																	
	Kyle Reid									Ret	14	9												
	Alex Denning														17	13	11							
	Tom Rawlings														Ret	14	Ret							
	Joshua Jackson																	15	16	24				
	Taylor Whitson														27	28	19	23	21	20				
	Steve King									20	19	DSQ												
	Mark Dickson									DNS	Ret	24												
Pos	Driver	SNE			BHI			OUL		KNO			CRO		DON			BHGP			Total	Drop	Pen.	Pts
