= PP Motorsport =

PP Motorsport is a professional motor racing team based in Lincoln, United Kingdom. It currently competes in UK Clio Cup with driver Anton Spires.

== History ==
Team owner, John Creasey, runs an automotive body and paint shop, Paint Perfect, in Lincoln. With a long running interest in motor sport and an increasing number of clients bringing racing cars for body repairs, a half-finished Peugeot 106 GTi track car was purchased from eBay to be a company project in 2012. The car was developed by staff during evenings and run at local track days at the weekends. By winter 2013, it had become a very reliable, capable track car and Creasey started to research race series in which the Peugeot would be eligible. By April 2014, a decision had been made to purchase a new vehicle to br purpose-built for entry into the Michelin Clio Cup Series. The Peugeot was sold to a track day organizer and is currently available for rental.

== 2014 Michelin Clio Cup Series ==
The team watched the opening rounds of the season from the stands at Rockingham. In the following week, an accident-damaged Renault Clio 197 F1 arrived at the workshop and, working evenings for the next seven weeks, it was repaired and rebuilt to Road Series specification. Creasey and the team made their first race in May at Oulton Park.

It was a difficult first year for the new team with heavy damage sustained at Donington Park, but good performances at Brands Hatch and Snetterton. Limping the car home with a damaged track rod at Croft gave Creasey enough points to claim the Road Sport title. Westbourne Motorsport's Anton Spires claimed the overall Road Series title at the previous meeting at Snetterton.

== 2015 Michelin Clio Cup Series ==
Creasey entered the Road Series again in 2015 with the season highlight coming in the form of a double pole position and podium finish at Thruxton.

The reigning Road Series Champion, Anton Spires, was signed as driver coach to the team and he was entered into the Race Series for the final two meetings of the year. After a spectacular battle with James Dorlin, Spires just missed out on a podium finish on his first weekend at Oulton Park.

== 2016 UK Clio Cup ==
In winter 2015, PP Motorsport decided it would graduate to UK Clio Cup a full year ahead of the five-year business plan. Spires would resume driving while Creasey would take a year out of racing to concentrate on team management. The team would be assisted by Westbourne Motorsport which had a planned UK Clio Cup return for 2017.
