= Ant Whorton-Eales =

British racing driver (born 1994)

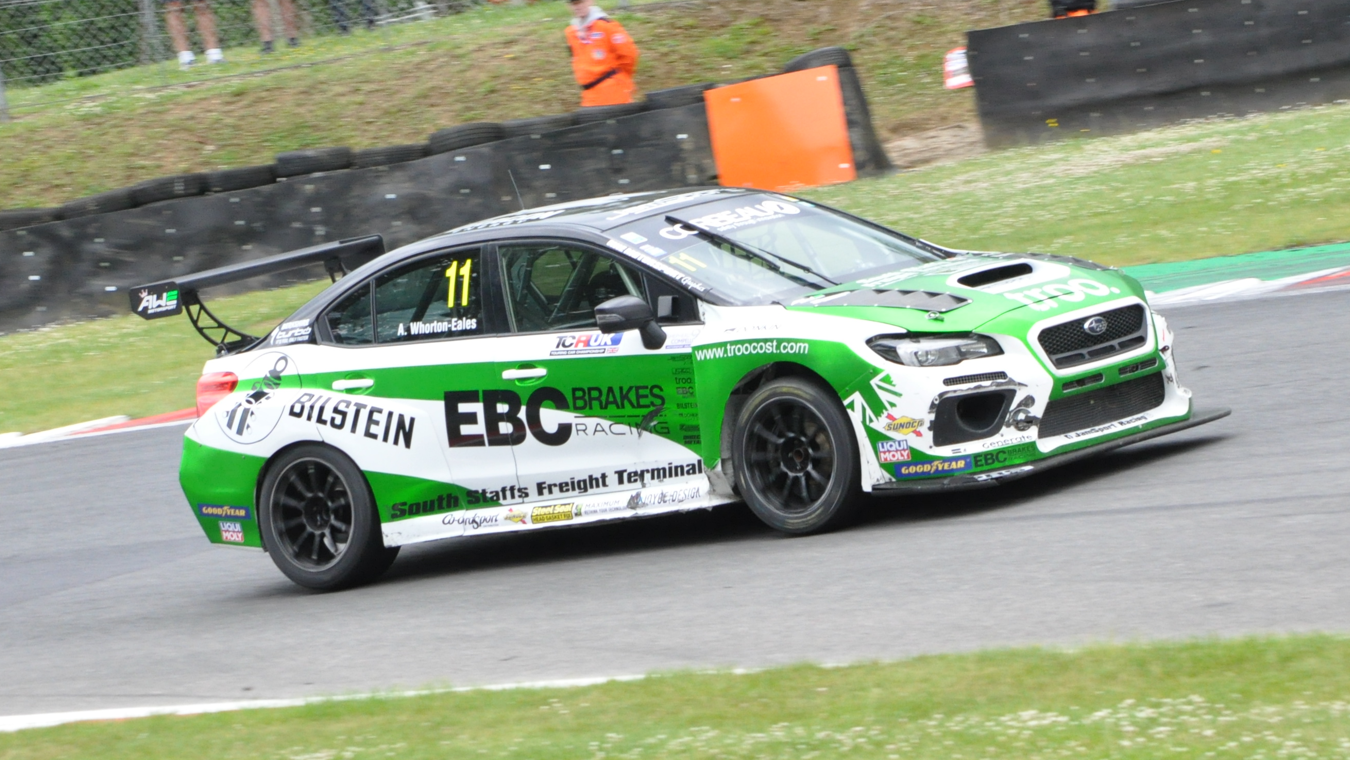
- Whorton-Eales competing in the TCR UK Championship
- Nationality: (United Kingdom) British
- Born: Anthony Whorton-Eales; 21 May 1994 (age 32) Lichfield, Staffordshire

NASCAR Whelen Euro Series career
- Debut season: 2019
- Current team: Marko Stipp Motorsport AmD Tuning
- Car number: 46
- Starts: 4
- Wins: 0
- Poles: 0
- Fastest laps: 0
- Best finish: 29th in 2019
- Finished last season: 29th in 2019

Previous series
- 2018 2017–18 2011–16: Mini Challenge UK; British Touring Car Championship; Renault Clio Cup UK

Championship titles
- 2018 2016: Mini Challenge UK; Renault Clio Cup UK; Brisca Formula One Under 25

Anthony Whorton-Eales (born 21 May 1994) is a British racing driver who last competed in a one-off round of the 2024 Mini Challenge UK for Jamsport Racing UK. He previously won the Mini Challenge UK championship in 2018, Renault Clio Cup UK championship in 2016 and the BriSCA F1 Under 25s Championship in 2016.

== Racing career ==
=== Early career ===
Whorton-Eales began his car racing career at the age of 11 on the short ovals in the ORCi Ministox under the number 254 with Incarace Motor Sport in which he raced until his 16th birthday. In 2011, he joined the Renault UK Clio Cup, running four races for Scuderia Vittoria. In 2012, he ran his first full season in the series for Westbourne Motorsport, finishing the season eighth in points. For 2013, he joined the KX Akademy as well as becoming a member of the BRDC's rising stars. This saw him return to Scuderia Vittoria where he would take his first Clio Cup win on his way to seventh in points. The following two seasons saw him move to SV Racing coming fourth in points in 2014 while 2015 saw him become a championship contender against Ashley Sutton and Ash Hand, he eventually finished the season bottom of the trio, third in points.

2016 saw Whorton-Eales run for his own team where he would battle returning 2014 champion, Mike Bushell for the championship. In the end he narrowly came out on top to win the Renault UK Clio Cup title on his fifth attempt.

Whorton-Eales is still competitive on the short ovals, racing in everything from a budget formula known as Incarods to Classic Hot Rods, and he has also competed in BriSCA Formula One Stock Cars where he is the current Under-25 Champion.

=== British Touring Car Championship ===
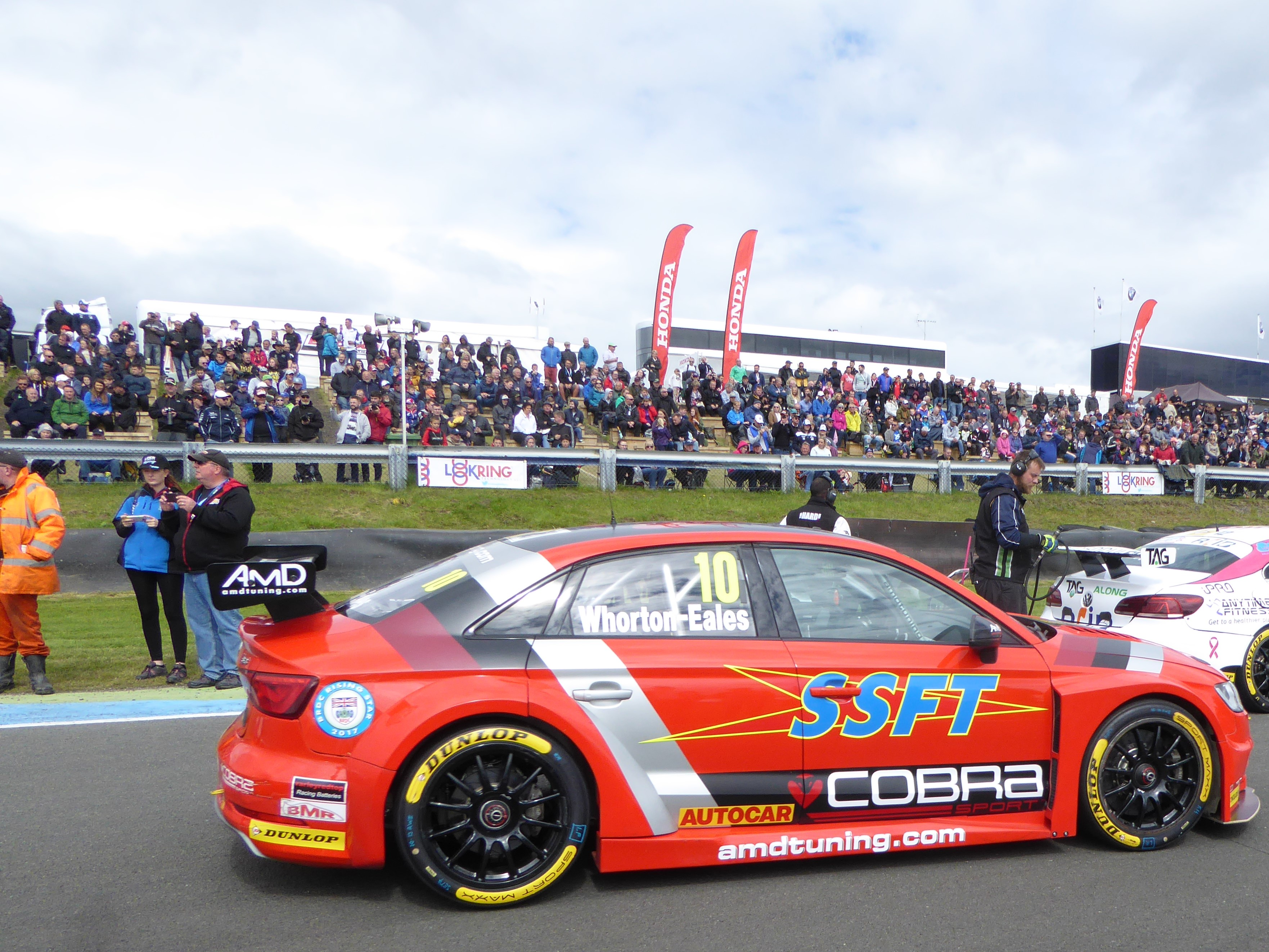
Whorton-Eales, at the Knockhill round of the 2017 British Touring Car Championship.

For the 2017 season, Whorton-Eales was signed by AmD Tuning to compete in the British Touring Car Championship. He drove the team's second Audi S3 alongside Ollie Jackson.

Whorton-Eales missed the first half of the 2018 BTCC season, replacing Tom Boardman at AmD during the mid-season break. He returned to the Championship at Snetterton for the BTCC 60th Anniversary meeting.

=== Mini Challenge UK ===
Unable to find a drive for the 2018 BTCC season, Whorton-Eales moved to the Mini Challenge UK with JamSport Racing where he would secure the drivers championship that season. After leaving the series to compete in the NASCAR Whelen Euro Series, it was announced on 6 November 2019 that Whorton-Eales will be returning to the series in 2020 to compete full-time with JamSport Racing.

=== NASCAR Whelen Euro Series ===
2019 saw Whorton-Eales move to the NASCAR Whelen Euro Series with AmD Tuning in a partnership with Racing-Total and Jennifer Jo Cobb Racing. He would drive the No. 46 Ford Mustang full-time in the Elite 1 class.

== Racing record ==
=== Complete British Touring Car Championship results ===
(key) (Races in bold indicate pole position – 1 point awarded just in first race; races in italics indicate fastest lap – 1 point awarded all races; * signifies that driver led race for at least one lap – 1 point given all races)

Year	Team	Car	1	2	3	4	5	6	7	8	9	10	11	12	13	14	15	16	17	18	19	20	21	22	23	24	25	26	27	28	29	30	DC	Pts
2017	AmD Tuning with Cobra Exhausts	Audi S3 Saloon	BRH; 1; 25	BRH; 2 Ret	BRH; 3; 23	DON; 1; 16	DON; 2; 12	DON; 3 Ret	THR; 1; 30	THR; 2; 24	THR; 3 DNS	OUL; 1; 27	OUL; 2; 28	OUL; 3; 21	CRO; 1; 16	CRO; 2; 11	CRO; 3; 17	SNE; 1; 20	SNE; 2; 21	SNE; 3; 11	KNO; 1; 17	KNO; 2; 10	**KNO**; **3**; 27*	ROC; 1; 18	ROC; 2; 18	ROC; 3 Ret	SIL; 1; 6	SIL; 2; 23	SIL; 3; 13	BRH; 1; 16	BRH; 2; 18	BRH; 3; 25	23rd	34
2018	AmD with AutoAid RCIB Insurance Racing	MG 6 GT	BRH; 1	BRH; 2	BRH; 3	DON; 1	DON; 2	DON; 3	THR; 1	THR; 2	THR; 3	OUL; 1	OUL; 2	OUL; 3	CRO; 1	CRO; 2	CRO; 3	SNE; 1; 23	SNE; 2; 10	SNE; 3; 16	ROC; 1	ROC; 2	ROC; 3	KNO; 1	KNO; 2	KNO; 3	SIL; 1	SIL; 2	SIL; 3	BRH; 1	BRH; 2	BRH; 3	30th	6

=== Complete NASCAR results ===
==== NASCAR Whelen Euro Series – Elite 1 ====
NASCAR Whelen Euro Series – Elite 1 results
Year	Team	No.	Make	1	2	3	4	5	6	7	8	9	10	11	12	13	NWES	Pts
2019	Racing-Total AmD Tuning	46	Ford	VAL; 27	VAL; 15	FRA; Wth	FRA; Wth										29th	72
2019	Marko Stipp Motorsport AmD Tuning	46	Ford					BRH; 8	BRH; 26	MOS	MOS	VEN	HOC	HOC	ZOL	ZOL	29th	72

Sporting positions
Preceded by Ashley Sutton	Renault Clio Cup United Kingdom; Champion; 2016	Succeeded by Mike Bushell
Preceded by Brett Smith	Mini Challenge UK; Champion; 2018	Succeeded by James Gornall
