= Ollie Pidgley =

British racing driver (born 1997)

- Nationality: (United Kingdom) British
- Born: Oliver John Pidgley; 25 August 1997 (age 29)

British Touring Car Championship career
- Debut season: 2018
- Current team: Trade Price Cars with Brisky Racing
- Car number: 43
- Starts: 12
- Wins: 0
- Poles: 0
- Fastest laps: 0
- Best finish: 38th in 2018
- Finished last season: 38th

Previous series
- 2018 2016-17 2015: Mini Challenge UK; Renault UK Clio Cup; MSA Formula

Oliver John Pidgley (born 25 August 1997) is a British racing driver, who will compete in the British Touring Car Championship with Trade Price Cars with Brisky Racing. He had previously competed in MSA Formula, Renault UK Clio Cup and the Mini Challenge UK.

== Racing Record ==
=== Complete MSA Formula Championship results ===
(key) (Races in bold indicate pole position – 1 point awarded in first race; races in italics indicate fastest lap – 1 point awarded all races; * signifies that driver lead race for at least one lap – 1 point awarded all races)

Year	Team	1	2	3	4	5	6	7	8	9	10	11	12	13	14	15	16	17	18	19	20	21	22	23	24	25	26	27	28	29	30	Pos	Pts
2015	Richardson Racing	BHI; 1	BHI; 2	BHI; 3	DON; 1; 16	DON; 2; 17	DON; 3; 14	THR; 1; 14	THR; 2; 18	THR; 3; 16	OUL; 1; 17	OUL; 2; 16	OUL; 3; 17	CRO; 1; 13	CRO; 2; 17	CRO; 3; 15	SNE; 1 Ret	SNE; 2; 19	SNE; 3; 15	KNO; 1; 13	KNO; 2; 10	KNO; 3; 12	ROC; 1	ROC; 2	ROC; 3	SIL; 1	SIL; 2	SIL; 3	BHGP; 1	BHGP; 2	BHGP; 3	21st	17

=== Complete Renault UK Clio Cup results ===
(key) (Races in bold indicate pole position – 1 point awarded in first race; races in italics indicate fastest lap – 1 point awarded all races; * signifies that driver lead race for at least one lap – 1 point awarded all races)

Year	Team	1	2	3	4	5	6	7	8	9	10	11	12	13	14	15	16	17	18	Pos	Pts
2016	Ciceley Motorsport	BHI; 1; 16	BHI; 2; 11	DON; 1; 10	DON; 2 Ret	THR; 1; 17	THR; 2; 12	OUL; 1; 15	OUL; 2; 16	CRO; 1; 13	CRO; 2; 11	SNE; 1; 16	SNE; 2; 14	ROC; 1; 12	ROC; 2; 11	SIL; 1; 16	SIL; 2; 10	BHGP; 1 Ret	BHGP; 2 Ret	16th	112
2017	Team Pyro	BHI; 1; 8	BHI; 2; 7	DON; 1 Ret	DON; 2 Ret	THR; 1; 12	THR; 2; 13	OUL; 1	OUL; 2	CRO; 1	CRO; 2	SNE; 1	SNE; 2	ROC; 1	ROC; 2	SIL; 1	SIL; 2	BHGP; 1	BHGP; 2	19th	45

=== Complete British Touring Car Championship results ===
(key) (Races in bold indicate pole position – 1 point awarded in first race; races in italics indicate fastest lap – 1 point awarded all races; * signifies that driver lead race for at least one lap – 1 point awarded all races)

Year	Team	Car	1	2	3	4	5	6	7	8	9	10	11	12	13	14	15	16	17	18	19	20	21	22	23	24	25	26	27	28	29	30	Pos	Pts
2018	Trade Price Cars with Brisky Racing	Volkswagen CC	BRH; 1	BRH; 2	BRH; 3	DON; 1	DON; 2	DON; 3	THR; 1	THR; 2	THR; 3	OUL; 1	OUL; 2	OUL; 3	CRO; 1	CRO; 2	CRO; 3	SNE; 1	SNE; 2	SNE; 3	ROC; 1 Ret	ROC; 2; 25	ROC; 3; 22	KNO; 1; 27	KNO; 2; 21	KNO; 3 NC	SIL; 1; 20	SIL; 2; 23	SIL; 3 Ret	BRH; 1; 27	BRH; 2 Ret	BRH; 3 Ret	38th	0
