= James Gornall (racing driver) =

British former racing driver and team manager (born 1984)

- Nationality: British
- Born: 8 July 1984 (age 42) Nottingham, England

British Touring Car Championship career
- Debut season: 2020
- Current team: Bristol Street Motors with Excelr8 TradePriceCars.com
- Car number: 18
- Former teams: GKR TradePriceCars.com
- Starts: 22
- Poles: 0
- Fastest laps: 0
- Best finish: 20th in 2020

Previous series
- Mini Challenge UK; BMW Compact Cup; British GT Championship; UK Formula Renault; BARC Formula Renault

Championship titles
- 2019 2017 2008 2003: Mini Challenge UK JCW; BMW Compact Cup; British GT Championship GT3; BARC Formula Renault 2.0

James "Jiggy" Gornall (born 8 July 1984 in Nottingham) is a British former racing driver and team manager who currently manages Fortec Motorsport in the F4 British Championship. He won the 2019 Mini Challenge UK, and the 2008 British GT Championship. He last competed in the British Touring Car Championship in 2023 for Team HARD.

== Personal life ==
Gornall spent much of his early life in Peterborough, Cambridgeshire, and now resides near Bedford, Bedfordshire. He was educated at Arthur Mellows Village College and obtained a BA(Hons) from Oxford Brookes University in Business Management.

Gornall is a driver coach and holds an 'A' Grade ARDS instructor licence. He was previously the Head of Sales & Marketing at Aero Tec Laboratories, Head of Motorsport at Ellis Clowes and Championship Coordinator at the MSV FIA Formula Two Championship.

== Racing career ==
In 2019, Gornall became a full Member of the British Racing Drivers' Club.

=== Karting ===
Gornall began kart racing in 1995 in the Comer Cadet class. In 1996, he moved into Formula Junior TKM, finishing third in the 1999 Super One National Championship. In 2000, Gornall moved into the Formula TKM Championship, and in 2001, he won the Super One National Championship. For 2002, Gornall stepped up to the Intercontinental A class, finishing sixth in the Super One National Championship and he also took part in the European Championship.

During his time at Oxford Brookes University, Gornall was part of the British Universities Karting Championship team who won three consecutive championships from 2004 to 2006.

=== BARC Formula Renault ===
2003 was Gornall's first season of car racing, stepping up to the BARC Formula Renault Championship with JA Motorsport in the Van Diemen RF98/99. Gornall won the championship at his first attempt.

=== UK Formula Renault ===
In 2004, Gornall and the JA Motorsport team continued their relationship to enter the Formula Renault UK Championship which supported the British Touring Car Championship. Following the Croft race weekend, Gornall was forced to withdraw from the championship due to lack of funds.

=== British GT ===
Gornall's first foray in British GT was the final round of the 2007 Championship with Team Trimite Brookspeed in the Dodge Viper Competition Coupe, partnering Italian Michelangelo Segatori.

For 2008, Gornall continued with Team Trimite Brookspeed, once again in the Dodge Viper Competition Coupe, partnering Jon Barnes. Gornall and Barnes won four races, stepping on the podium a total of 8 times on their way to winning the championship at the Brands Hatch event in July.

=== 24hr Racing ===
Gornall was invited during 2008 to race with Beechdean Motorsport in their Aston Martin N24 at the Silverstone 24hrs. He was joined by Andrew Howard, Neil Cunningham and Jamie Smythe. The team took 2nd place overall, winning class 2.

=== BMW Compact Cup ===
Gornall competed in the BMW Compact Cup from 2015–2017. He came second in 2015 and won the title in 2016.

=== MINI Challenge JCW ===
In April 2019, Gornall made a guest appearance at Rockingham in the MINI Challenge JCW. Gornall drove the Dunlop guest car run by XCELR8 Motorsport. This was Gornall's debut in a front wheel drive racing car. Gornall then obtained a MINI JCW race car of his own and competed in the Brands Hatch GP and Donington Park events.

For 2020, Gornall competed in his family run JIG Racing team. Gornall won the championship, taking five wins and a total of 13 podiums from 17 races.

=== British Touring Car Championship ===
For winning the 2019 MINI Challenge JCW championship, Gornall received a prize test at Snetterton in the Motorbase Ford Focus RS.

==== Trade Price Cars Racing (2020) ====
It was announced on 9 January 2020 at the Autosport international Show that Gornall would be joining the BTCC with Trade Price Cars Racing in their Audi S3 Saloon.

Gornall returned to the championship for a one off appearance at the Croft Circuit round of the 2022 season, filling in for Jack Butel at Bristol Street Motors with Excelr8 TradePriceCars.com.

== Racing record ==
=== British GT Championship results ===
Year	Driver(s)	OUL		KNO		ROC		SNE		THR		BRH		SIL	DON	DC	Pts
2008	James Gornall	21	6	2	2	1	13	1	2	3	1	1	7	Ret	8	1	76
2008	Jon Barnes	21	6	2	2	1	13	1	2	3	1	1	7	Ret	8	1	76

=== MINI Challenge UK JCW Results ===
Year	OUL		SNE		SIL		DON		BHI			BHGP		DON		SNE		PP	FL	Total	Drop	Pts
2019	1	2	1	3	3	Ret	2	4	1	2	5	5	1	1	2	3	2	38	60	793	0	793

=== Complete British Touring Car Championship results ===
(key) Races in bold indicate pole position (1 point awarded – 2002–2003 all races, 2004–present just in first race) Races in italics indicate fastest lap (1 point awarded all races) * signifies that driver lead race for at least one lap (1 point awarded – 2002 just in feature races, 2003–present all races)

Year	Team	Car	1	2	3	4	5	6	7	8	9	10	11	12	13	14	15	16	17	18	19	20	21	22	23	24	25	26	27	28	29	30	DC	Points
2020	GKR TradePriceCars.com	Audi S3 Saloon	DON; 1 Ret	DON; 2 DNS	DON; 3; 16	BRH; 1; 13	BRH; 2; 10	BRH; 3; 7	OUL; 1; 18	OUL; 2 Ret	OUL; 3; 21	KNO; 1 Ret	KNO; 2; 20	KNO; 3; 18	THR; 1; 18	THR; 2 Ret	THR; 3 DNS	SIL; 1; 22	SIL; 2; 16	SIL; 3 Ret	CRO; 1	CRO; 2	CRO; 3	SNE; 1	SNE; 2	SNE; 3	BRH; 1	BRH; 2	BRH; 3				20th	18
2022	Bristol Street Motors with Excelr8 TradePriceCars.com	Hyundai i30 Fastback N Performance	DON; 1	DON; 2	DON; 3	BRH; 1	BRH; 2	BRH; 3	THR; 1	THR; 2	THR; 3	OUL; 1	OUL; 2	OUL; 3	CRO; 1; 14	CRO; 2 Ret	CRO; 3; 17	KNO; 1	KNO; 2	KNO; 3	SNE; 1	SNE; 2	SNE; 3	THR; 1	THR; 2	THR; 3	SIL; 1	SIL; 2	SIL; 3	BRH; 1	BRH; 2	BRH; 3	24th	2
2023	Go-Fix with Autoaid Breakdown	Cupra León	DON; 1	DON; 2	DON; 3	BRH; 1	BRH; 2	BRH; 3	SNE; 1	SNE; 2	SNE; 3	THR; 1	THR; 2	THR; 3	OUL; 1	OUL; 2	OUL; 3	CRO; 1	CRO; 2	CRO; 3	KNO; 1	KNO; 2	KNO; 3	DON; 1	DON; 2	DON; 3	SIL; 1	SIL; 2	SIL; 3	BRH; 1 Ret	BRH; 2; 15	BRH; 3; 19	27th	1
