= 2023 Porsche Carrera Cup Great Britain =

The 2023 Porsche Carrera Cup Great Britain was a multi-event, one-make motor racing championship held across England and Scotland. The championship featured a mix of professional motor racing teams and privately funded drivers. It formed part of the extensive program of support categories built up around the BTCC centrepiece.

== Teams and drivers ==
The following teams and drivers are currently signed to run the 2023 season.

Team	No.	Driver	Class	Rounds
Pro Class
Richardson Racing	5	(Monaco) Micah Stanley		1–4, 6, 8
Richardson Racing	46	(Netherlands) Robert de Haan	R	1–4, 6, 8
JTR	8	(United Kingdom) Hugo Ellis		1–4
JTR	57	(United Kingdom) Gus Burton		5, 7–8
JTR	128	(United Kingdom) Will Martin		6
Team Parker Racing	8	(United Kingdom) Hugo Ellis		5–8
Team Parker Racing	16	(United Kingdom) Harry Foster	R	All
Team Parker Racing	21	(United Kingdom) Adam Smalley		All
Century Motorsport	13	(United Kingdom) James Kellett		All
Century Motorsport	57	(United Kingdom) Gus Burton		1–2
Century Motorsport	90	(United Kingdom) Josh Malin		3–8
Redline Racing	14	(United Kingdom) Matthew Graham		All
Redline Racing	54	(United Kingdom) Theo Edgerton		1–3, 7
Toro Verde GT	27	(United Kingdom) Will Martin		8
CCK Motorsport	99	(United Kingdom) Charles Rainford		All
Pro-Am Class
Team Parker Racing	11	(United Kingdom) Will Aspin		All
Team Parker Racing	22	(United Kingdom) Ryan Ratcliffe		5
Team Parker Racing	33	(United Kingdom) Ryan Ratcliffe		1–4, 6–8
Team Parker Racing	41	(United Kingdom) Jake Giddings		All
Redline Racing	44	(United Kingdom) Max Bird	R	All
Redline Racing	59	(United Kingdom) Ross Wylie		All
Redline Racing	94	(United Kingdom) Oliver White		5–8
JTR	48	(United Kingdom) Ollie Jackson		All
JTR	95	(United Kingdom) Josh Stanton		All
Century Motorsport	52	(United Kingdom) Angus Whiteside		All
Century Motorsport	58	(United Kingdom) Henry Dawes		All
Toro Verde GT	77	(United Kingdom) Frazer McFadden		All
Richardson Racing	88	(United Kingdom) Seb Melrose		1–2
EXCELR8 Motorsport	315	(United Kingdom) Jason Lockwood	R	All
Am Class
Team Parker Racing	7	(United Kingdom) Justin Sherwood		1–6
Toro Verde GT	9	(United Kingdom) David Fairbrother		1–5
Redline Racing	71	(United Kingdom) David Stirling		1–6

== Race calendar ==
Round		Circuit	Date
1	R1	Donington Park (National Circuit, Leicestershire)	22–23 April
1	R2	Donington Park (National Circuit, Leicestershire)	22–23 April
2	R3	Brands Hatch (Indy Circuit, Kent)	6–7 May
2	R4	Brands Hatch (Indy Circuit, Kent)	6–7 May
3	R5	Thruxton Circuit (Hampshire)	3–4 June
3	R6	Thruxton Circuit (Hampshire)	3–4 June
4	R7	Oulton Park (Island Circuit, Little Budworth)	17–18 June
4	R8	Oulton Park (Island Circuit, Little Budworth)	17–18 June
5	R9	Knockhill Racing Circuit (Fife)	12–13 August
5	R10	Knockhill Racing Circuit (Fife)	12–13 August
6	R11	Donington Park (GP Circuit, Leicestershire)	26–27 August
6	R12	Donington Park (GP Circuit, Leicestershire)	26–27 August
7	R13	Silverstone Circuit (National Circuit, Northamptonshire)	23–24 September
7	R14	Silverstone Circuit (National Circuit, Northamptonshire)	23–24 September
8	R15	Brands Hatch (Grand Prix Circuit, Kent)	7–8 October
8	R16	Brands Hatch (Grand Prix Circuit, Kent)	7–8 October

== Championship standings ==
Points system
	1st	2nd	3rd	4th	5th	6th	7th	8th	PP	FL
Race 1 (Pro)	12	10	8	6	4	3	2	1	2	1
Race 2 (All Classes)	10	8	6	5	4	3	2	1	0	1

=== Drivers' championships ===
Pos	Driver	DON		BHI		THR		OUL		KNO		DON		SIL		BHGP		Pts
Pro Class
1	(United Kingdom) Adam Smalley	2	1	2	4	2	3	2	1	2	3	3	1	2	3	4	1	141
2	(United Kingdom) James Kellett	Ret	7	4	1	4	17	1	5	5	1	1	3	3	10	1	3	102
3	(United Kingdom) Josh Malin					3	2	4	2	7	4	4	4	4	8	3	2	75
4	(United Kingdom) Charles Rainford	21	15	3	2	5	1	5	4	4	6	7	6	10	4	7	5	68
5	(United Kingdom) Matthew Graham	4	3	5	5	6	14	14	8	3	2	5	5	11	5	Ret	11	60
6	(Netherlands) Robert de Haan	1	18	1	3	1	Ret	17	6			10	Ret			2	4	55
7	(United Kingdom) Gustav Burton	3	2	Ret	11					1	Ret			1	6	Ret	7	45
8	(United Kingdom) Harry Foster	7	5	13	12	21	12	13	13	6	5	6	9	6	1	Ret	12	38
9	(United Kingdom) Hugo Ellis	5	6	9	8	13	11	11	DNS	10	Ret	11	Ret	5	2	6	8	37
10	(Monaco) Micah Stanley	9	4	8	6	7	4	3	3			19	14			10	9	33
11	(United Kingdom) Will Martin											2	2			Ret	17	18
12	(United Kingdom) Theo Edgerton	12	17	7	7	WD	WD							17	17			6
Pro-Am Class
1	(United Kingdom) Max Bird	6	8	10	10	9	6	9	7	14	9	9	Ret	12	14	11	16	116
2	(United Kingdom) Ross Wylie	10	11	6	9	15	13	6	11	8	11	Ret	11	13	7	8	13	109
3	(United Kingdom) Ryan Ratcliffe	11	9	15	13	12	10	16	10	9	7	12	Ret	19	13	13	15	76
4	(United Kingdom) Angus Whiteside	8	10	14	15	14	9	8	9	20	8	Ret	Ret	7	19	14	18	69
5	(United Kingdom) Will Aspin	22	13	12	14	10	8	7	12	15	17	DSQ	12	15	9	9	10	69
6	(United Kingdom) Jake Giddings	13	14	20	19	8	5	12	Ret	Ret	15	8	7	14	Ret	Ret	21	53
7	(United Kingdom) Ollie Jackson	15	16	11	18	11	7	18	15	16	10	17	Ret	9	11	12	14	53
8	(United Kingdom) Josh Stanton	16	12	18	21	16	16	10	14	11	Ret	15	10	21	16	16	19	36
9	(United Kingdom) Henry Dawes	19	20	17	16	18	19	15	19	17	13	20	13	8	15	18	20	26
10	(United Kingdom) Jason Lockwood	18	Ret	16	Ret	17	15	19	16	12	12	13	Ret	18	20	15	22	20
11	(United Kingdom) Frazer McFadden	14	21	21	20	19	18	20	17	19	14	16	Ret	20	18	17	23	8
12	(United Kingdom) Seb Melrose	17	19	19	17													2
	(United Kingdom) Oliver White*									13	Ret	14	8	16 (Note: Oliver White claimed the pole position in the Pro-Am class as a driver ineligible for points. The bonus points were given to the highest qualified eligible driver – Will Aspin.)	12	5 (Note: Oliver White claimed the pole position in the Pro-Am class as a driver ineligible for points. The bonus points were given to the highest qualified eligible driver – Ross Wylie.)	6	
Am Class
1	(United Kingdom) Justin Sherwood	20	22	22	22	20	20	21	18	18	16	18	15					143
2	(United Kingdom) David Fairbrother	23	23	23	Ret	22	22	Ret	20	21	Ret							52
3	(United Kingdom) David Stirling	24	Ret	Ret	23	Ret	21	Ret	Ret	Ret	18	WD	WD					31

* Guest entry – ineligible for points
