= 2021 Ginetta GT4 Supercup =

The 2021 Millers Oils Ginetta GT4 Supercup is a multi-event, one make GT motor racing championship held across England and Scotland. The championship features a mix of professional motor racing teams and privately funded drivers, competing in Ginetta G55s that conform to the technical regulations for the championship. It forms part of the extensive program of support categories built up around the BTCC centrepiece. It is the eleventh Ginetta GT4 Supercup, having rebranded from the Ginetta G50 Cup, which ran between 2008 and 2010. The season commenced on 12 June at Snetterton and concludes on 24 October at Brands Hatch, utilising the GP circuit, after twenty-three races held at eight meetings, all in support of the 2021 British Touring Car Championship.

== Teams and drivers ==
For 2021 the amateur class was removed, seeing a return to a two class structure.

Team	No.	Drivers	Rounds
Professional
Team HARD	8	(United Kingdom) Sebastian Melrose	1–4, 6, 8
Team HARD	99	(United Kingdom) Joe Marshall-Birks	All
Century Motorsport	6	(United Kingdom) James Kellett	7–8
Century Motorsport	9	(United Kingdom) Andy Spencer	1–7
Century Motorsport	58	(United Kingdom) Henry Dawes	All
Century Motorsport	73	(United Kingdom) Nathan Freke	8
Century Motorsport	84	(United Kingdom) Blake Angliss	All
Breakell Racing	12	(United Kingdom) Reece Somerfield	All
AK Motorsport	13	(United Kingdom) James Blake-Baldwin	All
Elite Motorsport	21	(United Kingdom) Josh Rattican	All
Elite Motorsport	27	(United Kingdom) Tom Emson	All
Elite Motorsport	54	(United Kingdom) Adam Smalley	All
Rob Boston Racing	25	(United Kingdom) Tom Roche	6
Rob Boston Racing	26	(United Kingdom) Luke Reade	1–5, 7–8
Rob Boston Racing	56	(United Kingdom) Steve Roberts	1–3, 7–8
Rob Boston Racing	81	(United Kingdom) Tom Hibbert	All
Raceway Motorsport	55	(United Kingdom) Luca Hirst	1
Preptech UK	76	(United Kingdom) Carlito Miracco	All
Pro-Am
Assetto Motorsport	10	(United Kingdom) Darren Leung	7–8
Race Car Consultants	11	(United Kingdom) Luke Warr	All
AK Motorsport	5	(United Kingdom) Fraser Robertson	7
AK Motorsport	19	(United Kingdom) Carl Garnett	All
AK Motorsport	23	(United Kingdom) Garry Townsend	All
Simon Green Motorsport	31	(United Kingdom) Dan Morris	1, 3, 7–8
Fox Motorsport	40	(United Kingdom) Nick Halstead	3–4, 8
Elite Motorsport	44	(United Kingdom) Peter Mangion	6
Team HARD	68	(United Kingdom) Eric Boulton	5, 8
CWS Motorsport	78	(United Kingdom) Colin White	All
Preptech UK	88	(Sweden) Alex Andersson	1
Rob Boston Racing	95	(United Kingdom) Stewart Lines	2–3, 7

== Race Calendar ==
Round	Race	Circuit	Date	Pole position	Fastest lap	Winning driver	Winning team	Winning Pro-Am
1	R1	Snetterton Circuit	12 June	Adam Smalley	Adam Smalley	Adam Smalley	Elite Motorsport	Colin White
1	R2	Snetterton Circuit	13 June		Josh Rattican	Adam Smalley	Elite Motorsport	Colin White
1	R3	Snetterton Circuit	13 June		Josh Rattican	Josh Rattican	Elite Motorsport	Dan Morris
2	R4	Brands Hatch Indy	26 June	Carlito Miracco	Carlito Miracco	Carlito Miracco	Preptech UK	Colin White
2	R5	Brands Hatch Indy	26 June		Tom Hibbert	Adam Smalley	Elite Motorsport	Colin White
2	R6	Brands Hatch Indy	27 June		James Blake-Baldwin	Tom Hibbert	Rob Boston Racing	Colin White
3	R7	Oulton Park	31 July	Adam Smalley	Carlito Miracco	Tom Hibbert	Rob Boston Racing	Colin White
3	R8	Oulton Park	1 August		Steve Roberts	Tom Hibbert	Rob Boston Racing	Colin White
4	R9	Knockhill Racing Circuit	14 August	Adam Smalley	Adam Smalley	Adam Smalley	Elite Motorsport	Colin White
4	R10	Knockhill Racing Circuit	15 August		Tom Hibbert	Adam Smalley	Elite Motorsport	Colin White
4	R11	Knockhill Racing Circuit	15 August		Tom Hibbert	Tom Hibbert	Rob Boston Racing	Colin White
5	R12	Thruxton Circuit	28 August	Adam Smalley	Josh Rattican	Adam Smalley	Elite Motorsport	Colin White
5	R13	Thruxton Circuit	29 August		Adam Smalley	Adam Smalley	Elite Motorsport	Colin White
5	R14	Thruxton Circuit	29 August		Tom Hibbert	James Blake-Baldwin	AK Motorsport	Colin White
6	R15	Croft Circuit	18 September	Tom Hibbert	Josh Rattican	Tom Hibbert	Rob Boston Racing	Carl Garnett
6	R16	Croft Circuit	19 September		Tom Hibbert	Tom Hibbert	Rob Boston Rscing	Colin White
6	R17	Croft Circuit	19 September		James Blake-Baldwin	Josh Rattican	Elite Motorsport	Carl Garnett
7	R18	Donington Park	9 October	Josh Rattican	James Kellett	Josh Rattican	Elite Motorsport	Dan Morris
7	R19	Donington Park	10 October		James Kellett	James Kellett	Century Motorsport	Colin White
7	R20	Donington Park	10 October		James Kellett	Carlito Miracco	Preptech UK	Colin White
8	R21	Brands Hatch GP	23 October	James Kellett	James Kellett	James Kellett	Century Motorsport	Dan Morris
8	R22	Brands Hatch GP	24 October		James Kellett	James Kellett	Century Motorsport	Carl Garnett
8	R23	Brands Hatch GP	24 October		Tom Emson	Tom Emson	Elite Motorsport	Colin White

== Championship standings ==
Points system
1st	2nd	3rd	4th	5th	6th	7th	8th	9th	10th	11th	12th	13th	14th	15th	16th	17th	18th	19th	20th	R1 PP	FL
35	30	26	22	20	18	16	14	12	11	10	9	8	7	6	5	4	3	2	1	1	1

Notes

- A driver's best 22 scores counted towards the championship, with any other points being discarded.

=== Drivers' championships ===
Pos	Driver	SNE			BHI			OUL		KNO			THR			CRO			DON			BHGP			Points
Professional
1	Adam Smalley	1	1	Ret	2	1	5	12	6	1	1	5	1	1	2	2	2	3	3	2	4	5	4	3	628
2	Josh Rattican	5	3	1	16	5	8	2	2	2	5	2	2	2	Ret	3	3	1	1	3	3	2	3	2	577
3	Tom Hibbert	2	2	2	Ret	3	1	1	1	3	3	1	4	4	10	1	1	5	7	8	8	6	5	5	572
4	Carlito Miracco	3	12	7	1	12	18	7	3	4	4	3	3	3	Ret	7	5	2	5	6	1	3	2	4	501
5	James Blake-Baldwin	4	4	Ret	Ret	DNS	2	18	7	6	7	4	5	5	1	4	4	4	10	7	2	8	9	7	406
6	Tom Emson	7	5	3	3	2	4	6	8	5	2	11	6	10	3	16	6	Ret	Ret	10	9	11	6	1	403
7	Reece Somerfield	10	8	8	5	4	6	4	5	10	9	7	8	13	4	6	7	6	4	5	7	12	Ret	10	366
8	Joe Marshall-Birks	9	11	4	4	8	7	10	4	7	6	8	7	6	5	8	9	8	9	19	Ret	4	7	Ret	340
9	Steve Roberts	6	6	6	Ret	7	3	5	12										6	4	6	9	8	8	242
10	Blake Angliss	20	7	5	8	11	9	13	19	9	13	Ret	9	8	6	12	12	9	Ret	9	Ret	10	Ret	14	228
11	Henry Dawes	11	Ret	12	6	6	10	9	Ret	11	8	10	Ret	12	7	Ret	10	Ret	13	16	12	14	Ret	12	205
12	Andy Spencer	12	10	9	9	13	12	11	16	Ret	12	Ret	11	11	8	9	15	10	8	Ret	11				189
13	Luke Reade	15	13	Ret	11	Ret	19	3	Ret	8	10	6	Ret	7	Ret				Ret	Ret	10	13	10	6	147
14	Sebastian Melrose	Ret	16	13	10	9	11	Ret	13	13	Ret	9				10	14	Ret				15	11	11	133
15	Tom Roche															5	8	7							41
16	Luca Hirst	8	9	Ret																					26
	James Kellett*																		2	1	5	1	1	Ret	
	Nathan Freke*																					7	12	9	
Pro-Am
1	Colin White	13	14	17	7	10	13	8	9	12	11	12	10	9	9	13	11	Ret	12	11	13	17	Ret	13	723
2	Carl Garnett	14	15	11	12	14	14	14	11	15	14	15	12	14	11	11	13	11	14	12	15	19	13	15	659
3	Luke Warr	17	20	15	15	17	15	17	15	16	16	13	15	17	13	15	Ret	12	17	17	17	23	16	17	480
4	Garry Townsend	18	19	16	14	16	16	Ret	17	17	15	Ret	14	16	14	14	16	13	16	18	19	18	17	19	456
5	Dan Morris	16	17	10				15	10										11	14	14	16	Ret	Ret	271
6	Nick Halstead							16	14	14	Ret	14										20	14	Ret	151
7	Eric Boulton												13	15	12							21	15	18	144
8	Stewart Lines				13	15	17	Ret	18										19	15	16				144
9	Alex Andersson	19	18	14																					66
	Peter Mangion															Ret	DNS	DNS							
	Darren Leung*																		15	13	18	22	Ret	16	
	Fraser Robertson*																		18	Ret	20				
Pos	Driver	SNE			BHI			OUL		KNO			THR			CRO			DON			BHGP			Points

- Guest entry - not eligible for points
