= Lorcan Hanafin =

British racing driver (born 2002)

- Hanafin at Silverstone Circuit in 2026
- Nationality: (United Kingdom) British
- Born: 6 December 2002 (age 23) Ilkley, United Kingdom

European Le Mans Series career
- Debut season: 2023
- Current team: Iron Lynx
- Categorisation: FIA Silver
- Former teams: JMW Motorsport, Grid Motorsport by TF
- Starts: 12 (12 entries)
- Wins: 0
- Podiums: 2
- Poles: 3
- Fastest laps: 0
- Best finish: 6th in 2023

Lorcan Hanafin (born 6 December 2002) is a British racing driver who is currently competing in the 2025 European Le Mans Series for Iron Lynx in the LMGT3 class, he is the runner up of the 2021 Porsche Carrera Cup Great Britain. Hanafin was also a member of the Aston Martin Racing Driver Academy.

== Career ==
=== Karting ===
Hanafin's father did competitive rallying in Ireland and in the United Kingdom, as he brought Hanafin a go-kart on his fifth birthday. He would only do competitive karting in the United Kingdom, making his debut in 2011, where he contested the 2011 Trent Valley Kart Club in the WTP Cadet and finished the championship in 13th.

In 2012, Hanafin also contested one sole championship the Kartmasters British Grand Prix and in the WTP Cadet category for Forza Racing, coming fourth in the overall championship standings.

Hanafin switched the IAME Cadet machinery in 2013, where he first raced in the LGM Series, coming in 17th. With Ollie Walker Racing, he would compete in the Trent Valley Kart Club – also coming in 17th – and the Super One Series Championship, the most prestigious karting championship in United Kingdom.

In his sophomore year in the IAME Cadet class in 2014, Hanafin competed in the LGM Series, finishing the championship in ninth and the Kartmasters British Grand Prix, where he came in 19th. Hanafin partnered up with Ollie Walker Racing to compete in the Super One Series Championship.

2015 was Hanafin's final and most successful year in the IAME Cadet category, where he first drove in the LGM Series, finishing fifth overall in the standings. Hanafin came sixth in the Kartmasters British Grand Prix and would compete with Ollie Walker Racing for the third year in the Super One Series Championship, finish a respectable seventh in the standings.

For his last year in karting, Hanafin switched to the Rotax Mini Max class but still contested British championships. He adapted well the category, coming fourth in the Super One Series Championship, fifth in the Kartmasters British Grand Prix and tenth in the British Open Championship.

=== Renault UK Clio Cup Junior ===
After a moderately successful karting career, Hanafin stepped up to car racing in 2017, competing in the Renault UK Clio Cup Junior with Team Pyro. In the eight races he won three of them, got a pole position in five of them, a fastest lap in three of them and a podium in four of them. Hanafin finished the championship fourth in the standings with 143 points.

In 2018, Hanafin competed in four races as a guest driver with Team Pyro, getting a podium in two of the races.

=== Ginetta Junior Championship ===
After coming sixth in the 2018 Ginetta Junior Winter Championship, Hanafin would have to wait until the fifth round at Croft Circuit to make his debut in the 2018 Ginetta Junior Championship for Douglas Motorsport. His highest result in his campaign was a fourth place at the Rockingham Motor Speedway, and he would finish the championship in 13th with 167 points.

Hanafin would drive for Douglas Motorsport in 2019 Ginetta Junior Championship, as would compete in every race of the season. The first round of the season at Brands Hatch was where he got his first podium – a third place – in the series at the second race.

Hanafin wouldn't get anymore podiums until the seventh round of the year at Thruxton Circuit, coming in third position in the first and third races. The last quarter of the year was more successful, as he got his maiden car racing win at the final race of the next round at Knockhill.

In the penultimate round of the season at Silverstone Circuit, Hanafin got a double podium in the last two races and in the final round of his campaign at Brands Hatch, he would snatch a second win at the second race and got a final podium in the final race of the season. Hanafin finished fourth in the overall standings of the championship with two wins, one pole position, two fastest laps, eight podiums and 480 points.

=== Porsche competition ===
==== 2020 ====
Hanafin would switch to Porsche Carrera Cup racing in the 2020 season, driving in the local 2020 Porsche Carrera Cup Great Britain with JTR. He got four podiums throughout the season but no wins, with his best result being a second place at Thruxton Circuit. Hanafin finished the championship fourth in the standings with 70 points.

Hanafin also competed in two races of the 2020 Britcar Endurance Championship, finishing sixth in the team standings.

==== 2021 ====
In 2021, Hanafin returned to the Porsche Carrera Cup Great Britain for the 2021 season with JTR with the goal of winning the championship. He started off the season strong with a maiden Porsche Carrera Cup win in the first race of the season Brands Hatch.

At Snetterton Circuit, Hanafin got his maiden pole position in car racing in the first race, which he converted to a third place. He converted his first pole to a win a round later at the first race in Oulton Park, Hanafin got his first retirement of the year in the second race but bounced back with another win at the first race in Knockhill.

In Croft Circuit, Hanafin came second in the first race but retired from the final race, while at Silverstone Circuit he got a double podium – two second places – and a pole position in the two races.

Hanafin placed fourth and fifth in the penultimate round at Donington Park and got his final win of the year at the first race in Brands Hatch. He lost out on the title to Dan Cammish by only a few points and finished the championship with four wins, three pole positions, four fastest laps, eight podiums and 116 points.

==== 2022 ====
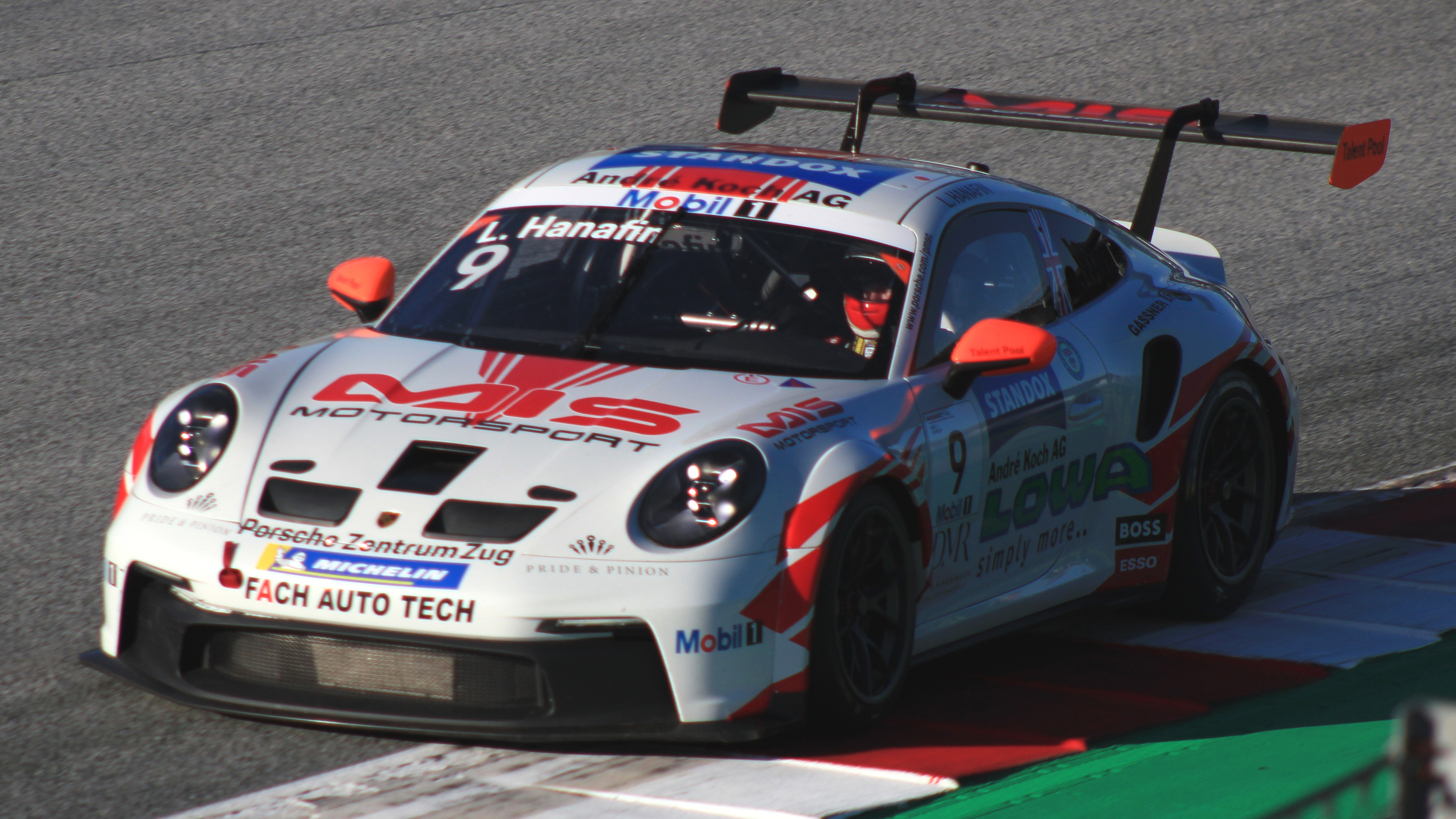
Hanafin competing in the Red Bull Ring round of the 2022 Porsche Supercup.

Hanafin would leave the Porsche Carrera Cup Great Britain and instead make his international racing debut in both the 2022 Porsche Supercup and the 2022 Porsche Carrera Cup Germany for Fach Auto Tech.

Hanafin did well in the Supercup, scoring points in every race minus the final two races, he got a best result of sixth in his home track at Silverstone Circuit and finished the championship in ninth with 40 points.

In the Porsche Carrera Cup Germany, Hanafin would score points in the majority of the races but his highlight of the year was a third place at the Sachsenring. He finished the championship in tenth with 78 points.

=== Asian Le Mans Series ===
==== 2023 ====
Hanafin would make his LMP3 debut in the 2023 Asian Le Mans Series for German team Rinaldi Racing, he would be teammate with Germans Matthias Lüthen and Jonas Ried for the fourth race season.

The trio only got one set of points – a fourth place at the Dubai Autodrome – in the first race, but they would retired from the next three races. Hanafin finished the championship in 12th with 12 points.

==== 2024–25 ====
Hanafin returned to the Asian Le Mans Series in the 2024–25 where he drove in the GT class from the second round of the series and onwards for Dragon Racing alongside Americans Aaron Telitz and Todd Coleman. As Dragon Racing was a guest team he was ineligible to score points.

Hanafin retired from his first race at the Dubai Autodrome, and withdrew from the second race also at the Dubai Autodrome. In his second and final round at the Yas Marina Circuit, he would score no points except for a highest of 17th place.

=== European Le Mans Series ===
==== 2023 ====
For his full-time campaign, Hanafin would compete in the 2023 European Le Mans Series driving for JMW Motorsport in the LMGTE category alongside Jon Lancaster and Martin Berry.

At the first round of the series at the 4 Hours of Barcelona, his team started the race on pole position, being Hanafin's first pole in the series. They finished the race in third place, with this also being Hanafin's first podium in the series.

After a sixth place at the second round of the series at the 4 Hours of Le Castellet, the trio achieved two consecutive podiums in the next two rounds at Aragón and Spa-Francorchamps, getting a fifth place at Aragón and retiring from the race at Spa-Francorchamps.

At the final round of the season at Algarve – which consisted of two races – the trio came eleventh in the first race and fourth in the second race. Hanafin, Lancaster and Berry finished the championship sixth in the standings with three pole positions, one podium and 47 points.

==== 2024 ====
Hanafin contested his second year of the championship with Grid Motorsport by TF in the newly rebranded LMGT3 class alongside Martin Berry and Jonathan Adam. He had a rather consistent season, coming seventh in the first two rounds then placing fifth in the next two rounds, getting a second place at Mugello and an eighth at the final round in Algarve. The trio ended the championship seventh in the standings with one podium and 54 points.

==== 2025 ====
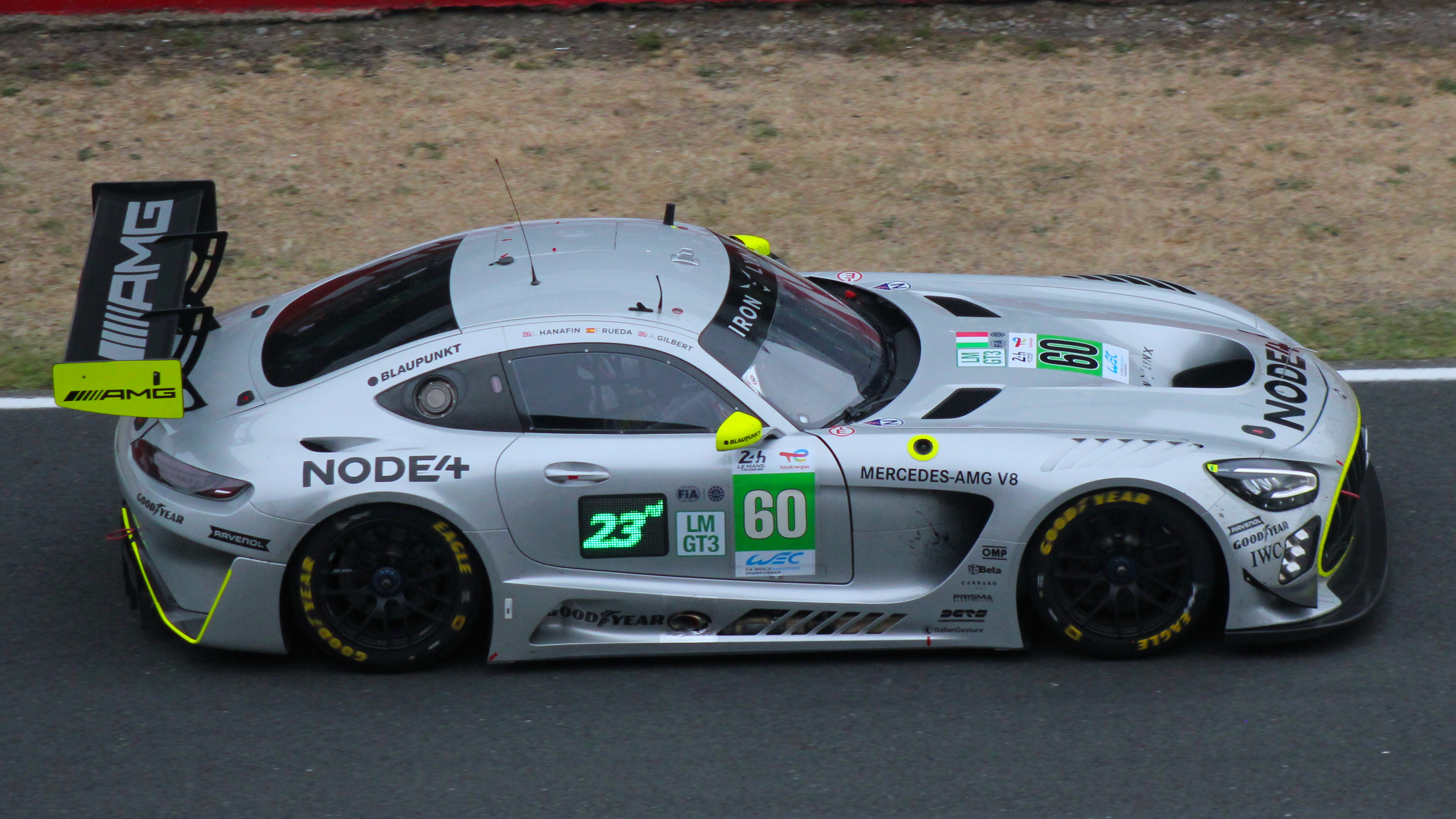
Hanafin's No. 60 car at the 2025 24 Hours of Le Mans

Hanafin is set to compete for LMGT3 reigning teams champion Iron Lynx for the 2025 season alongside Martin Berry and Fabian Schiller.

=== GT World Challenge Europe Endurance Cup ===
==== 2023 ====
Hanafin joined Samantha Tan and Isaac Tutumlu for the final round of the 2023 GT World Challenge Europe Endurance Cup at Circuit de Barcelona-Catalunya with ST Racing with Rinaldi, where he competed in the Pro-Am class. The trio got on pole position in the race and won the race as well, also bagging a fastest lap. Hanafin placed 12th in the Pro-Am standings with 26 points.

==== 2024 ====
The Briton joined German outfit Walkenhorst Racing alongside Frenchmen Romain Leroux and Maxime Robin for the 2024 GT World Challenge Europe Endurance Cup, where he competed in the Silver Cup.

Hanafin, Leroux and Robin would score points in every race of the season – except for the Nürburgring where they retired from the race – and despite not finishing the 2024 24 Hours of Spa, his team was classified for points as they competed the required race distance to score points. They also got a third place at Monza Circuit and finished 11th in the standings with 49 points.

==== 2025 ====
For the 2025 GT World Challenge Europe Endurance Cup, he will stay in the Silver Cup but switch to British team Steller Motorsport, partnering compatriot Kiern Jewiss and Belgian Matisse Lismont.

== Karting record ==
=== Karting career summary ===
Season	Series	Team	Position
2011	Trent Valley Kart Club - WTP Cadet		13th
2012	Kartmasters British Grand Prix - WTP Cadet	Forza Racing	4th
2013	LGM Series - IAME Cadet		17th
2013	Trent Valley Kart Club - IAME Cadet	OWR	17th
2013	Super One Series Championship - IAME Cadet	Ollie Walker Racing	
2014	LGM Series - IAME Cadet		9th
2014	Kartmasters British Grand Prix - IAME Cadet		19th
2014	Super One Series Championship - IAME Cadet	Ollie Walker Racing	
2015	LGM Series - IAME Cadet		5th
2015	Kartmasters British Grand Prix - IAME Cadet		6th
2015	Super One Series Championship - IAME Cadet	OWR	7th
2016	Super One Series Championship - Rotax Mini Max		4th
2016	Kartmasters British Grand Prix - Rotax Mini Max		5th
2016	British Open Championship - Rotax Mini Max		10th

== Racing record ==
=== Racing career summary ===
Season	Series	Team	Races	Wins	Poles	F/Laps	Podiums	Points	Position
2017	Renault UK Clio Cup Junior	Team Pyro	8	3	5	3	4	143	4th
2018	Ginetta Junior Winter Championship		3	0	0	0	0	40	6th
2018	Ginetta Junior Championship	Douglas Motorsport	15	0	0	1	0	167	13th
2018	Renault UK Clio Cup Junior	Team Pyro	4	0	0	0	2	0	NC†
2019	Ginetta Junior Championship	Douglas Motorsport	26	2	0	2	8	480	4th
2020	Porsche Carrera Cup Great Britain - Pro	JTR	16	0	0	2	4	70	4th
2020	Britcar Endurance Championship	CJJ Motorsport with Valluga Racing	2	0	0	0	0	181‡	6th‡
2021	Porsche Carrera Cup Great Britain - Pro	JTR	16	4	3	4	8	116	**2nd**
2022	Porsche Supercup	Fach Auto Tech	8	0	0	0	0	40	9th
2022	Porsche Carrera Cup Germany	Fach Auto Tech	16	0	0	0	1	78	10th
2023	Asian Le Mans Series - LMP3	Rinaldi Racing	4	0	0	0	0	12	12th
2023	European Le Mans Series - LMGTE	JMW Motorsport	6	0	3	0	1	47	6th
2023	GT World Challenge Europe Endurance Cup	ST Racing with Rinaldi	1	0	0	0	0	0	NC
2023	GT World Challenge Europe Endurance Cup - Pro-Am	ST Racing with Rinaldi	1	1	1	1	1	26	12th
2024	European Le Mans Series - LMGT3	Grid Motorsport by TF	6	0	0	0	1	54	7th
2024	GT World Challenge Europe Endurance Cup	Walkenhorst Racing	5	0	0	0	0	0	NC
2024	GT World Challenge Europe Endurance Cup - Silver	Walkenhorst Racing	5	0	0	0	1	49	11th
2024	Le Mans Cup - GT3	Blackthorn	2	1	0	0	1	16.5	10th
2024–25	Asian Le Mans Series - GT	Dragon Racing	3	0	0	0	0	0	NC†
2025	European Le Mans Series - LMGT3	Iron Lynx	6	0	0	0	2	51	7th
2025	FIA World Endurance Championship - LMGT3	Iron Lynx	5	0	0	1	0	1	25th
2025	GT World Challenge Europe Endurance Cup	Steller Motorsport	5	0	0	0	0	0	NC
2025	GT World Challenge Europe Endurance Cup - Silver	Steller Motorsport	5	0	0	0	1	39	9th
2025	Nürburgring Langstrecken-Serie - BMW M240i	Adrenalin Motorsport Team Mainhattan Wheels							
2026	GT World Challenge America - Pro-Am	JMF Motorsports	3	0	2	0	0	0	NC†
2026	European Le Mans Series - LMGT3	GR Racing	6	1	0	0	2	52	7th
2026	GT World Challenge Europe Endurance Cup	Ecurie Ecosse Blackthorn	2	0	0	0	0	0	NC
2026	24 Hours of Le Mans - LMGT3	TF Sport	1	0	0	0	0	N/A	14th

‡ Team standings

^{*} Season still in progress

^{†} As Hanafin was a guest driver, he was ineligible to score points

=== Complete Ginetta Junior Championship results ===
(key) (Races in bold indicate pole position) (Races in italics indicate fastest lap)

Year	Team	1	2	3	4	5	6	7	8	9	10	11	12	13	14	15	16	17	18	19	20	21	22	23	24	25	26	27	DC	Points
2018	Douglas Motorsport	BHI; 1	BHI; 2	DON; 1	DON; 2	DON; 3	THR1; 1	THR1; 2	OUL; 1	OUL; 2	CRO; 1; 17	CRO; 2; 12	CRO; 3; 8	SNE; 1; 14	SNE; 2; 8	SNE; 3; 11	ROC; 1; 4	ROC; 2; 7	ROC; 3; 9	KNO; 1	KNO; 2	SIL; 1; 8	SIL; 2; 7	SIL; 3; 9	BHGP; 1; 15	BHGP; 2; 11	BHGP; 3 Ret		13th	167
2019	Douglas Motorsport	BHI; 1; 9	BHI; 2; 3	DON; 1; 8	DON; 2; 6	DON; 3; 4	THR1; 1; 6	THR1; 2; 16	CRO; 1 C	CRO; 2; 13	OUL; 1; 4	OUL; 2; 4	SNE; 1; 5	SNE; 2; 13	SNE; 3 Ret	SNE; 4; 9	THR2; 1; 3	THR2; 2 Ret	THR2; 3; 3	KNO; 1; 7	KNO; 2; 12	KNO; 3; 1	SIL; 1; 4	SIL; 2; 2	SIL; 3; 2	BHGP; 1; 6	BHGP; 2; 1	BHGP; 3; 2	4th	480

=== Complete Porsche Carrera Cup Great Britain results ===
(key) (Races in bold indicate pole position) (Races in italics indicate fastest lap)

Year	Team	1	2	3	4	5	6	7	8	9	10	11	12	13	14	15	16	Pos.	Points
2020	JTR	DON; 1; 5	DON; 2; 10	BHGP; 1; 3	BHGP; 2; 5	OUL; 1; 3	OUL; 2; 6	KNO; 1 Ret	KNO; 2; 6	THR; 1; 3	THR; 2; 2	SIL; 1; 4	SIL; 2; 5	SNE; 1; 5	SNE; 2; 4	BHI; 1 Ret	BHI; 2 Ret	4th	70
2021	JTR	BHI; 1; 1	BHI; 2; 7	**SNE**; **1**; 3	SNE; 2; 5	**OUL**; **1**; 1	OUL; 2 Ret	KNO; 1; 1	KNO; 2; 5	CRO; 1; 2	CRO; 2 Ret	**SIL**; **1**; 2	SIL; 2; 2	DON; 1; 4	DON; 2; 5	BHGP; 1; 1	BHGP; 2; 11	2nd	116

=== Complete Porsche Supercup results ===
(key) (Races in bold indicate pole position; races in italics indicate fastest lap)

Year	Team	1	2	3	4	5	6	7	8	Pos.	Points
2022	Fach Auto Tech	IMO; 8	MON; 14	SIL; 6	RBR; 10	LEC; 13	SPA; 7	ZND; 19	MNZ; 19	9th	40

=== Complete Porsche Carrera Cup Germany results ===
(key) (Races in bold indicate pole position) (Races in italics indicate fastest lap)

Year	Team	1	2	3	4	5	6	7	8	9	10	11	12	13	14	15	16	DC	Points
2022	Fach Auto Tech	SPA; 1; 21	SPA; 2; 13	RBR; 1; 10	RBR; 2; 19	IMO; 1; 8	IMO; 2; 13	ZAN; 1; 8	ZAN; 2; 10	NÜR; 1; 8	NÜR; 2; 16	LAU; 1; 12	LAU; 2; 12	SAC; 1; 23	SAC; 2; 3	HOC; 1; 7	HOC; 2; 12	10th	78

=== Complete Asian Le Mans Series results ===
(key) (Races in bold indicate pole position) (Races in italics indicate fastest lap)

Year	Team	Class	Car	Engine	1	2	3	4	5	6	Pos.	Points
2023	Rinaldi Racing	LMP3	Duqueine M30 – D08	Nissan VK56DE 5.6L V8	DUB; 1; 4	DUB; 2 Ret	ABU; 1 Ret	ABU; 2 Ret			12th	12
2024–25	Dragon Racing	GT	Ferrari 296 GT3	Ferrari F163 3.0 L Turbo V6	SEP; 1	SEP; 2	DUB; 2 Ret	DUB; 2 WD	ABU; 1; 17	ABU; 2; 23	NC†	0

† As Hanafin was a guest driver, he was ineligible for points.

=== Complete European Le Mans Series results ===
(key) (Races in bold indicate pole position) (Races in italics indicate fastest lap)

Year	Entrant	Class	Chassis	Engine	1	2	3	4	5	6	Rank	Points
2023	JMW Motorsport	LMGTE	Ferrari 488 GTE Evo	Ferrari F154CB 3.9 L Turbo V8	**CAT**; 3	LEC; 6	**ARA**; 5	**SPA**; Ret	ALG; 11	ALG; 4	6th	47
2024	Grid Motorsport by TF	LMGT3	Aston Martin Vantage AMR GT3 Evo	Aston Martin M177 4.0 L Turbo V8	CAT; 7	LEC; 7	IMO; 5	SPA; 5	MUG; 2	ALG; 8	7th	54
2025	Iron Lynx	LMGT3	Mercedes-AMG GT3 Evo	Mercedes-AMG M159 6.2 L V8	**CAT**; Ret	LEC; 2	**IMO**; Ret	**SPA**; 2	SIL; Ret	ALG; 4	7th	51
2026	GR Racing	LMGT3	Ferrari 296 GT3 Evo	Ferrari F163CE 3.0 L Turbo V6	CAT; Ret	LEC; 3	IMO; 7	SPA; 1	SIL; 8	ALG; 9	7th	52

=== Complete GT World Challenge Europe Endurance Cup results ===
(Races in bold indicate pole position) (Races in italics indicate fastest lap)

Year	Team	Car	Class	1	2	3	4	5	6	7	Pos.	Points
2023	ST Racing with Rinaldi	Ferrari 296 GT3	Pro-Am	MNZ	LEC	SPA; 6H	SPA; 12H	SPA; 24H	NÜR	**CAT**; 32	12th	26
2024	Walkenhorst Racing	Aston Martin Vantage AMR GT3 Evo	Silver	LEC; 34	SPA; 6H; 26	SPA; 12H; 30	SPA; 24H; 44†	NÜR; Ret	MNZ; 19	JED; 31	11th	49
2025	Steller Motorsport	Chevrolet Corvette Z06 GT3.R	Silver	LEC; 19	MNZ; 32	SPA; 6H; 19	SPA; 12H; 52	SPA; 24H; 40	NÜR; Ret	CAT; 45	9th	39
2026	Ecurie Ecosse Blackthorn	Aston Martin Vantage AMR GT3 Evo	Bronze	LEC	MNZ; 9	SPA; 6H; 27	SPA; 12H; 41	SPA; 24H; 31	NÜR	ALG	12th	32

* Season still in progress.

=== Complete FIA World Endurance Championship results ===
(key) (Races in bold indicate pole position; races in italics indicate fastest lap)

Year	Entrant	Class	Chassis	Engine	1	2	3	4	5	6	7	8	Rank	Points
2025	Iron Lynx	LMGT3	Mercedes-AMG GT3 Evo	Mercedes-AMG M159 6.2 L V8	QAT	IMO	SPA	LMS; Ret	SÃO; 15	COA; 10	FUJ; 16	BHR; 13	25th	1

=== Complete 24 Hours of Le Mans results ===
Year	Team	Co-Drivers	Car	Class	Laps	Pos.	Class Pos.
2025	(Italy) Iron Lynx	(United Kingdom) Andrew Gilbert (Spain) Fran Rueda	Mercedes AMG GT3 Evo	LMGT3	57	DNF	DNF
2026	(United Kingdom) TF Sport	(United Kingdom) Ben Green (Malaysia) Prince Jefri Ibrahim	Chevrolet Corvette Z06 GT3.R	LMGT3	330	46th	14th
