= 2024 24 Hours of Spa =

77th 24 Hours of Spa endurance race

(Belgium) 2024 24 Hours of Spa
Event Information
- Round 2 of 5 in the 2024 GT World Challenge Europe Endurance Cup
- Date: 29–30 June 2024 GT World Challenge Europe Endurance Cup
- Location: Spa-Francorchamps, Wallonia, Belgium
- Venue: Circuit de Spa-Francorchamps

Results
Race 1
Distance	478 laps	3,347.912 km (2,080.296 mi) km
Pole position	(Italy) Marco Mapelli (France) Franck Perera (South Africa) Jordan Pepper (Austria) GRT Grasser Racing Team	2:13.718
Winner	(Italy) Mattia Drudi (Denmark) Marco Sørensen (Denmark) Nicki Thiim (Belgium) Comtoyou Racing	24:01:16.868

The 2024 24 Hours of Spa (also known as the CrowdStrike 24 Hours of Spa, and as the Spa Centenary) was the 77th running of the Spa 24 Hours and its centenary anniversary edition. The race took place from 29 to 30 June 2024. The race is part of both the 2024 GT World Challenge Europe Endurance Cup and the 2024 Intercontinental GT Challenge.

== Background ==
Supporting the race weekend was the GT4 European Series, GT2 European Series, McLaren Trophy Europe, as well as some Spa Anniversary races from the Heritage Touring Cup and Endurance Racing Legends to celebrate the 100 years of the 24 Hours of Spa.

== Entry list ==
A 66-car field contested the race — 24 in Pro class, 6 in Gold Cup, 10 in Silver Cup, 20 in Bronze Cup and 6 in Pro-Am Cup. 9 manufacturers were represented, with 14 Mercedes cars, 12 Porsche cars, 8 Audi cars, 7 Ferrari 296 GT3 cars, 6 BMW cars, 6 Lamborghini cars and 6 McLaren cars, as well as the debut for the new Aston Martin Vantage AMR GT3 Evo with 7 and the new Ford Mustang GT3 with just 1.

No.	Entrant	Car	Driver 1	Driver 2	Driver 3	Driver 4
Pro (24 entries)
2	(Germany) Mercedes-AMG Team GetSpeed	Mercedes-AMG GT3 Evo	(Andorra) Jules Gounon	(Germany) Fabian Schiller	(Germany) Luca Stolz	
7	(Belgium) Comtoyou Racing	Aston Martin Vantage AMR GT3 Evo	(Italy) Mattia Drudi	(Denmark) Marco Sørensen	(Denmark) Nicki Thiim	
9	(Belgium) Boutsen VDS	Mercedes-AMG GT3 Evo	(France) Thomas Drouet	(Germany) Maximilian Götz	(Belgium) Ulysse de Pauw	
22	(France) Schumacher CLRT	Porsche 911 GT3 R (992)	(France) Dorian Boccolacci	(Turkey) Ayhancan Güven	(Germany) Laurin Heinrich	
23	(China) Phantom Global Racing	Porsche 911 GT3 R (992)	(Sweden) Joel Eriksson	(New Zealand) Jaxon Evans	(Austria) Thomas Preining	
28	(Antigua and Barbuda) HAAS RT	Audi R8 LMS Evo II	(France) Simon Gachet	(Belgium) Jan Heylen	(Denmark) Dennis Lind	
32	(Belgium) Team WRT	BMW M4 GT3	(South Africa) Sheldon van der Linde	(Belgium) Dries Vanthoor	(Belgium) Charles Weerts	
34	(Germany) Walkenhorst Motorsport	Aston Martin Vantage AMR GT3 Evo	(Portugal) Henrique Chaves	(United Kingdom) Ross Gunn	(United Kingdom) David Pittard	
46	(Belgium) Team WRT	BMW M4 GT3	(Switzerland) Raffaele Marciello	(Belgium) Maxime Martin	(Italy) Valentino Rossi	
48	(United States) Mercedes-AMG Team Mann-Filter	Mercedes-AMG GT3 Evo	(Austria) Lucas Auer	(Germany) Maro Engel	(Canada) Daniel Morad	
51	(Italy) AF Corse - Francorchamps Motors	Ferrari 296 GT3	(Italy) Alessandro Pier Guidi	(Italy) Davide Rigon	(Italy) Alessio Rovera	
63	(Italy) Iron Lynx	Lamborghini Huracán GT3 Evo2	(Italy) Mirko Bortolotti	(Italy) Matteo Cairoli	(Italy) Andrea Caldarelli	
64	(Germany) Proton Competition	Ford Mustang GT3	(Germany) Christopher Mies	(Norway) Dennis Olsen	(Belgium) Frédéric Vervisch	
71	(Italy) AF Corse - Francorchamps Motors	Ferrari 296 GT3	(Monaco) Vincent Abril	(France) Thomas Neubauer	(Spain) David Vidales	
92	(Germany) SSR Herberth	Porsche 911 GT3 R (992)	(Australia) Matt Campbell	(France) Mathieu Jaminet	(France) Frédéric Makowiecki	
96	(Germany) Rutronik Racing	Porsche 911 GT3 R (992)	(France) Julien Andlauer	(Germany) Sven Müller	(Switzerland) Patric Niederhauser	
98	(Germany) ROWE Racing	BMW M4 GT3	(Austria) Philipp Eng	(Germany) Marco Wittmann	(United Kingdom) Nick Yelloly	
99	(Germany) Tresor Attempto Racing	Audi R8 LMS Evo II	(Germany) Alex Aka	(Switzerland) Ricardo Feller	(Germany) Christopher Haase	
130	(Hong Kong) Mercedes-AMG Team GruppeM Racing	Mercedes-AMG GT3 Evo	(Estonia) Ralf Aron	(Spain) Daniel Juncadella	(Denmark) Frederik Vesti	
159	(United Kingdom) Garage 59	McLaren 720S GT3 Evo	(United Kingdom) Tom Gamble	(Germany) Benjamin Goethe	(United Kingdom) Dean MacDonald	
163	(Austria) GRT Grasser Racing Team	Lamborghini Huracán GT3 Evo2	(Italy) Marco Mapelli	(South Africa) Jordan Pepper	(France) Franck Perera	
911	(Lithuania) Pure Rxcing	Porsche 911 GT3 R (992)	(Austria) Klaus Bachler	(United Kingdom) Alex Malykhin (Note: Malykhin is Belarusian, but he competes under a British licence as Belarusian national emblems were banned by the FIA following the Russian invasion of Ukraine.)	(Germany) Joel Sturm	
992	(Chinese Taipei) HubAuto Racing	Porsche 911 GT3 R (992)	(France) Kévin Estre	(France) Patrick Pilet	(Belgium) Laurens Vanthoor	
998	(Germany) ROWE Racing	BMW M4 GT3	(Brazil) Augusto Farfus	(United Kingdom) Dan Harper	(Germany) Max Hesse	
Gold (6 entries)
25	(France) Saintéloc Racing	Audi R8 LMS Evo II	(France) Paul Evrard	(Belgium) Gilles Magnus	(France) Jim Pla	(Belgium) Ugo de Wilde
60	(Bahrain) 2 Seas Motorsport	Mercedes-AMG GT3 Evo	(Bahrain) Isa Al Khalifa	(United Kingdom) Frank Bird	(Croatia) Martin Kodrić	(United Kingdom) Lewis Williamson
77	(Germany) Haupt Racing Team	Mercedes-AMG GT3 Evo	(Italy) Michele Beretta	(India) Arjun Maini	(Germany) Jusuf Owega	
88	(Germany) Tresor Attempto Racing	Audi R8 LMS Evo II	(Netherlands) Glenn van Berlo	(Italy) Lorenzo Ferrari	(Italy) Leonardo Moncini	(Italy) Lorenzo Patrese
111	(France) CSA Racing	Audi R8 LMS Evo II	(France) Romain Carton	(France) Adam Eteki	(France) Steven Palette	(France) Arthur Rougier
777	(Oman) AlManar Racing by GetSpeed	Mercedes-AMG GT3 Evo	(Oman) Al Faisal Al Zubair	(Austria) Dominik Baumann	(Switzerland) Philip Ellis	(Canada) Mikaël Grenier
Silver (10 entries)
3	(Germany) GetSpeed	Mercedes-AMG GT3 Evo	(United States) Anthony Bartone	(United Kingdom) James Kell	(Switzerland) Yannick Mettler	(United Kingdom) Aaron Walker
10	(Belgium) Boutsen VDS	Mercedes-AMG GT3 Evo	(France) Sébastien Baud	(France) César Gazeau	(United States) Roee Meyuhas	(France) Aurélien Panis
12	(Belgium) Comtoyou Racing	Aston Martin Vantage AMR GT3 Evo	(Belgium) Nicolas Baert	(France) Erwan Bastard	(Belgium) Esteban Muth	(Denmark) Sebastian Øgaard
19	(Austria) GRT Grasser Racing Team	Lamborghini Huracán GT3 Evo2	(United Kingdom) Hugo Cook	(Italy) Mateo Llarena	(Belgium) Baptiste Moulin	(Kuwait) Haytham Qarajouli
21	(Belgium) Comtoyou Racing	Aston Martin Vantage AMR GT3 Evo	(United Kingdom) Charles Clark	(Belgium) Sam Dejonghe	(Belgium) Matisse Lismont	(Netherlands) Xavier Maassen
26	(France) Saintéloc Racing	Audi R8 LMS Evo II	(Ukraine) Ivan Klymenko	(Norway) Marcus Påverud	(Belgium) Gilles Stadsbader	(France) Alban Varutti
35	(Germany) Walkenhorst Motorsport	Aston Martin Vantage AMR GT3 Evo	(United Kingdom) Lorcan Hanafin	(France) Romain Leroux	(France) Maxime Robin	
55	(Italy) Dinamic GT	Porsche 911 GT3 R (992)	(Finland) Axel Blom	(Norway) Marius Nakken	(France) Théo Nouet	(Netherlands) Jop Rappange
57	(United States) Winward Racing	Mercedes-AMG GT3 Evo	(Netherlands) "Daan Arrow"	(Netherlands) Colin Caresani	(Thailand) Tanart Sathienthirakul	
90	(Argentina) Madpanda Motorsport	Mercedes-AMG GT3 Evo	(Germany) Patrick Assenheimer	(Poland) Karol Basz	(Argentina) Ezequiel Pérez Companc	(Switzerland) Alain Valente
Bronze (20 entries)
5	(United Kingdom) Optimum Motorsport	McLaren 720S GT3 Evo	(United Kingdom) Shaun Balfe	(United Kingdom) Ben Barnicoat	(United Kingdom) Sam Neary	(Netherlands) Ruben del Sarte
8	(Switzerland) Kessel Racing	Ferrari 296 GT3	(Italy) Daniele Di Amato	(Italy) David Fumanelli	(Switzerland) Nicolò Rosi	(Italy) Niccolò Schirò
11	(Belgium) Comtoyou Racing	Aston Martin Vantage AMR GT3 Evo	(Belgium) Kobe Pauwels	(Netherlands) Dante Rappange	(Netherlands) Job van Uitert	(Belgium) John de Wilde
27	(United Kingdom) Optimum Motorsport	McLaren 720S GT3 Evo	(United Kingdom) Rob Bell	(United Kingdom) Ollie Millroy	(United Kingdom) Mark Radcliffe	(Spain) Fran Rueda
30	OQ by Oman Racing	BMW M4 GT3	(Oman) Ahmad Al Harthy	(United Kingdom) Sam De Haan	(Germany) Jens Klingmann	(Australia) Calan Williams
36	(Germany) Walkenhorst Motorsport	Aston Martin Vantage AMR GT3 Evo	(United Kingdom) Tim Creswick	(United States) Bijoy Garg	(United Kingdom) Ben Green	(Netherlands) Mex Jansen
52	(Italy) AF Corse	Ferrari 296 GT3	(Italy) Andrea Bertolini	(Belgium) Jef Machiels	(Belgium) Louis Machiels	(Italy) Tommaso Mosca
54	(Italy) Dinamic GT	Porsche 911 GT3 R (992)	(Germany) Marvin Dienst	(Portugal) Guilherme Oliveira	(Austria) Philipp Sager	(Austria) Christopher Zöchling
66	(Germany) Tresor Attempto Racing	Audi R8 LMS Evo II	(Austria) Max Hofer	Andrey Mukovoz (Note: Mukovoz is Russian, but he competes as a neutral competitor as Russian national emblems were banned by the FIA following the Russian invasion of Ukraine. Nesov, also a Russian, competes under a Kyrgyz licence for the same reason.)	(Kyrgyzstan) Alexey Nesov	(Luxembourg) Dylan Pereira
72	(United Kingdom) Barwell Motorsport	Lamborghini Huracán GT3 Evo2	(Finland) Patrick Kujala	(Italy) Mattia Michelotto	(Luxembourg) Gabriel Rindone	(United Kingdom) Casper Stevenson
74	(Switzerland) Kessel Racing	Ferrari 296 GT3	(United Kingdom) Matt Bell	(United Kingdom) John Hartshorne	(United States) Chandler Hull	(United Kingdom) Ben Tuck
78	(United Kingdom) Barwell Motorsport	Lamborghini Huracán GT3 Evo2	(United Kingdom) Till Bechtolsheimer	(United Kingdom) Ricky Collard	(France) Antoine Doquin	(United Kingdom) Sandy Mitchell
80	(Germany) Lionspeed x Herberth	Porsche 911 GT3 R (992)	(Hong Kong) Antares Au	(Switzerland) Alexander Fach	(Belgium) Alessio Picariello	(Estonia) Martin Rump
91	(Germany) Herberth Motorsport	Porsche 911 GT3 R (992)	(Germany) Ralf Bohn	(Germany) Alfred Renauer	(Germany) Robert Renauer	(Netherlands) Morris Schuring
93	(United Kingdom) Sky – Tempesta Racing	Ferrari 296 GT3	(Italy) Eddie Cheever III	(United Kingdom) Chris Froggatt	(Hong Kong) Jonathan Hui	(France) Lilou Wadoux
97	(Germany) Rutronik Racing	Porsche 911 GT3 R (992)	(United States) Dustin Blattner	(Netherlands) Loek Hartog	(Germany) Dennis Marschall	(Canada) Zacharie Robichon
158	(United Kingdom) Garage 59	McLaren 720S GT3 Evo	(United Kingdom) James Baldwin	(Denmark) Nicolai Kjærgaard	(United Kingdom) Chris Salkeld	(United Kingdom) Mark Sansom
188	(United Kingdom) Garage 59	McLaren 720S GT3 Evo	(Germany) Marvin Kirchhöfer	(Monaco) Louis Prette	(Portugal) Miguel Ramos	(United Kingdom) Adam Smalley
333	(Germany) Rinaldi Racing	Ferrari 296 GT3	(Italy) Fabrizio Crestani	(Germany) Felipe Fernández Laser	(Germany) Christian Hook	(South Africa) David Perel
991	(United Kingdom) Century Motorsport	BMW M4 GT3	(United States) Connor De Phillippi	(Brazil) Pedro Ebrahim	(United Kingdom) Darren Leung	(United Kingdom) Toby Sowery
Pro-Am (6 entries)
4	(United States) CrowdStrike by Riley	Mercedes-AMG GT3 Evo	(United States) Colin Braun	(Netherlands) Nicky Catsburg	(United Kingdom) Ian James	(United States) George Kurtz
16	(China) Uno Racing Team with Landgraf	Mercedes-AMG GT3 Evo	(Netherlands) Indy Dontje	(China) David Pun	(Hong Kong) "Rio"	(Hong Kong) Kevin Tse
38	(Antigua and Barbuda) HAAS RT	Audi R8 LMS Evo II	(Lithuania) Julius Adomavičius	(Belgium) Olivier Bertels	(Belgium) Armand Fumal	(Australia) Brad Schumacher
61	(New Zealand) Earl Bamber Motorsport	Porsche 911 GT3 R (992)	(New Zealand) Earl Bamber	(Malaysia) Adrian D'Silva	(New Zealand) Brendon Leitch	(China) Kerong Li
100	(United Kingdom) Team RJN	McLaren 720S GT3 Evo	(United Kingdom) Alex Buncombe	(United Kingdom) Chris Buncombe	(United Kingdom) Josh Caygill	(United Kingdom) Jann Mardenborough
888	(Australia) Triple Eight JMR	Mercedes-AMG GT3 Evo	(Malaysia) Prince Jefri Ibrahim	(Austria) Martin Konrad	(Australia) Jordan Love	(United Kingdom) Alexander Sims

== Race results ==
Class winners denoted in bold and with ‡

Pos	Class	No.	Team	Drivers	Car	Laps	Time/Retired
Pos	Class	No.	Team	Drivers	Engine	Laps	Time/Retired
1	P	**7**	**(Belgium) Comtoyou Racing**	**(Italy) Mattia Drudi (Denmark) Marco Sørensen (Denmark) Nicki Thiim**	**Aston Martin Vantage AMR GT3 Evo**	**478**	**24:01:16.868‡**
1	P	**7**	**(Belgium) Comtoyou Racing**	**(Italy) Mattia Drudi (Denmark) Marco Sørensen (Denmark) Nicki Thiim**	**Aston Martin M177 4.0 L Turbo V8**	**478**	**24:01:16.868‡**
2	P	51	(Italy) AF Corse - Francorchamps Motors	(Italy) Alessandro Pier Guidi (Italy) Davide Rigon (Italy) Alessio Rovera	Ferrari 296 GT3	478	+33.604
2	P	51	(Italy) AF Corse - Francorchamps Motors	(Italy) Alessandro Pier Guidi (Italy) Davide Rigon (Italy) Alessio Rovera	Ferrari F163CE 3.0 L Turbo V6	478	+33.604
3	P	32	(Belgium) Team WRT	(South Africa) Sheldon van der Linde (Belgium) Dries Vanthoor (Belgium) Charles Weerts	BMW M4 GT3	478	+38.831
3	P	32	(Belgium) Team WRT	(South Africa) Sheldon van der Linde (Belgium) Dries Vanthoor (Belgium) Charles Weerts	BMW P58 3.0 L Turbo I6	478	+38.831
4	P	34	(Germany) Walkenhorst Motorsport	(Portugal) Henrique Chaves (United Kingdom) Ross Gunn (United Kingdom) David Pittard	Aston Martin Vantage AMR GT3 Evo	478	+47.815
4	P	34	(Germany) Walkenhorst Motorsport	(Portugal) Henrique Chaves (United Kingdom) Ross Gunn (United Kingdom) David Pittard	Aston Martin M177 4.0 L Turbo V8	478	+47.815
5	P	163	(Austria) GRT Grasser Racing Team	(Italy) Marco Mapelli (South Africa) Jordan Pepper (France) Franck Perera	Lamborghini Huracán GT3 Evo2	478	+1:14.750
5	P	163	(Austria) GRT Grasser Racing Team	(Italy) Marco Mapelli (South Africa) Jordan Pepper (France) Franck Perera	Lamborghini DGF 5.2 L V10	478	+1:14.750
6	P	998	(Germany) Rowe Racing	(Brazil) Augusto Farfus (United Kingdom) Dan Harper (Germany) Max Hesse	BMW M4 GT3	478	+1:26.872
6	P	998	(Germany) Rowe Racing	(Brazil) Augusto Farfus (United Kingdom) Dan Harper (Germany) Max Hesse	BMW P58 3.0 L Turbo I6	478	+1:26.872
7	G	**777**	**(Oman) AlManar Racing by GetSpeed**	**(Oman) Al Faisal Al Zubair (Austria) Dominik Baumann (Switzerland) Philip Ellis (Canada) Mikaël Grenier**	**Mercedes-AMG GT3 Evo**	**478**	**+1:45.090‡**
7	G	**777**	**(Oman) AlManar Racing by GetSpeed**	**(Oman) Al Faisal Al Zubair (Austria) Dominik Baumann (Switzerland) Philip Ellis (Canada) Mikaël Grenier**	**Mercedes-AMG M159 6.2 L V8**	**478**	**+1:45.090‡**
8	P	92	(Germany) SSR Herberth	(Australia) Matt Campbell (France) Mathieu Jaminet (France) Frédéric Makowiecki	Porsche 911 GT3 R (992)	478	+1:45.904
8	P	92	(Germany) SSR Herberth	(Australia) Matt Campbell (France) Mathieu Jaminet (France) Frédéric Makowiecki	Porsche M97/80 4.2 L Flat-6	478	+1:45.904
9	P	96	(Germany) Rutronik Racing	(France) Julien Andlauer (Germany) Sven Müller (Switzerland) Patric Niederhauser	Porsche 911 GT3 R (992)	477	+1 Lap
9	P	96	(Germany) Rutronik Racing	(France) Julien Andlauer (Germany) Sven Müller (Switzerland) Patric Niederhauser	Porsche M97/80 4.2 L Flat-6	477	+1 Lap
10	B	**66**	**(Germany) Tresor Attempto Racing**	**(Austria) Max Hofer; Andrey Mukovoz (Kyrgyzstan) Alexey Nesov (Luxembourg) Dylan Pereira**	**Audi R8 LMS Evo II**	**477**	**+1 Lap‡**
10	B	**66**	**(Germany) Tresor Attempto Racing**	**(Austria) Max Hofer; Andrey Mukovoz (Kyrgyzstan) Alexey Nesov (Luxembourg) Dylan Pereira**	**Audi DAR 5.2 L V10**	**477**	**+1 Lap‡**
11	P	159	(United Kingdom) Garage 59	(United Kingdom) Tom Gamble (Germany) Benjamin Goethe (United Kingdom) Dean MacDonald	McLaren 720S GT3 Evo	477	+1 Lap
11	P	159	(United Kingdom) Garage 59	(United Kingdom) Tom Gamble (Germany) Benjamin Goethe (United Kingdom) Dean MacDonald	McLaren M840T 4.0 L Turbo V8	477	+1 Lap
12	P	99	(Germany) Tresor Attempto Racing	(Germany) Alex Aka (Switzerland) Ricardo Feller (Germany) Christopher Haase	Audi R8 LMS Evo II	477	+1 Lap
12	P	99	(Germany) Tresor Attempto Racing	(Germany) Alex Aka (Switzerland) Ricardo Feller (Germany) Christopher Haase	Audi DAR 5.2 L V10	477	+1 Lap
13	B	52	(Italy) AF Corse	(Italy) Andrea Bertolini (Belgium) Jef Machiels (Belgium) Louis Machiels (Italy) Tommaso Mosca	Ferrari 296 GT3	477	+1 Lap
13	B	52	(Italy) AF Corse	(Italy) Andrea Bertolini (Belgium) Jef Machiels (Belgium) Louis Machiels (Italy) Tommaso Mosca	Ferrari F163CE 3.0 L Turbo V6	477	+1 Lap
14	B	72	(United Kingdom) Barwell Motorsport	(Finland) Patrick Kujala (Italy) Mattia Michelotto (Luxembourg) Gabriel Rindone (United Kingdom) Casper Stevenson	Lamborghini Huracán GT3 Evo2	477	+1 Lap
14	B	72	(United Kingdom) Barwell Motorsport	(Finland) Patrick Kujala (Italy) Mattia Michelotto (Luxembourg) Gabriel Rindone (United Kingdom) Casper Stevenson	Lamborghini DGF 5.2 L V10	477	+1 Lap
15	G	25	(France) Saintéloc Racing	(France) Paul Evrard (Belgium) Gilles Magnus (France) Jim Pla (Belgium) Ugo de Wilde	Audi R8 LMS Evo II	476	+2 Laps
15	G	25	(France) Saintéloc Racing	(France) Paul Evrard (Belgium) Gilles Magnus (France) Jim Pla (Belgium) Ugo de Wilde	Audi DAR 5.2 L V10	476	+2 Laps
16	B	93	(United Kingdom) Sky – Tempesta Racing	(Italy) Eddie Cheever III (United Kingdom) Chris Froggatt (Hong Kong) Jonathan Hui (France) Lilou Wadoux	Ferrari 296 GT3	476	+2 Laps
16	B	93	(United Kingdom) Sky – Tempesta Racing	(Italy) Eddie Cheever III (United Kingdom) Chris Froggatt (Hong Kong) Jonathan Hui (France) Lilou Wadoux	Ferrari F163CE 3.0 L Turbo V6	476	+2 Laps
17	G	77	(Germany) Haupt Racing Team	(Italy) Michele Beretta (India) Arjun Maini (Germany) Jusuf Owega	Mercedes-AMG GT3 Evo	476	+2 Laps
17	G	77	(Germany) Haupt Racing Team	(Italy) Michele Beretta (India) Arjun Maini (Germany) Jusuf Owega	Mercedes-AMG M159 6.2 L V8	476	+2 Laps
18	P	9	(Belgium) Boutsen VDS	(France) Thomas Drouet (Germany) Maximilian Götz (Belgium) Ulysse de Pauw	Mercedes-AMG GT3 Evo	476	+2 Laps
18	P	9	(Belgium) Boutsen VDS	(France) Thomas Drouet (Germany) Maximilian Götz (Belgium) Ulysse de Pauw	Mercedes-AMG M159 6.2 L V8	476	+2 Laps
19	P	64	(Germany) Proton Competition	(Germany) Christopher Mies (Norway) Dennis Olsen (Belgium) Frédéric Vervisch	Ford Mustang GT3	475	+3 Laps
19	P	64	(Germany) Proton Competition	(Germany) Christopher Mies (Norway) Dennis Olsen (Belgium) Frédéric Vervisch	Ford Coyote 5.4 L V8	475	+3 Laps
20	B	11	(Belgium) Comtoyou Racing	(Belgium) Kobe Pauwels (Netherlands) Dante Rappange (Netherlands) Job van Uitert (Belgium) John de Wilde	Aston Martin Vantage AMR GT3 Evo	475	+3 Laps
20	B	11	(Belgium) Comtoyou Racing	(Belgium) Kobe Pauwels (Netherlands) Dante Rappange (Netherlands) Job van Uitert (Belgium) John de Wilde	Aston Martin M177 4.0 L Turbo V8	475	+3 Laps
21	B	27	(United Kingdom) Optimum Motorsport	(United Kingdom) Rob Bell (United Kingdom) Ollie Millroy (United Kingdom) Mark Radcliffe (Spain) Fran Rueda	McLaren 720S GT3 Evo	475	+3 Laps
21	B	27	(United Kingdom) Optimum Motorsport	(United Kingdom) Rob Bell (United Kingdom) Ollie Millroy (United Kingdom) Mark Radcliffe (Spain) Fran Rueda	McLaren M840T 4.0 L Turbo V8	475	+3 Laps
22	B	80	(Germany) Lionspeed x Herberth	(Hong Kong) Antares Au (Switzerland) Alexander Fach (Belgium) Alessio Picariello (Estonia) Martin Rump	Porsche 911 GT3 R (992)	475	+3 Laps
22	B	80	(Germany) Lionspeed x Herberth	(Hong Kong) Antares Au (Switzerland) Alexander Fach (Belgium) Alessio Picariello (Estonia) Martin Rump	Porsche M97/80 4.2 L Flat-6	475	+3 Laps
23	B	5	(United Kingdom) Optimum Motorsport	(United Kingdom) Shaun Balfe (United Kingdom) Ben Barnicoat (United Kingdom) Sam Neary (Netherlands) Ruben del Sarte	McLaren 720S GT3 Evo	475	+3 Laps
23	B	5	(United Kingdom) Optimum Motorsport	(United Kingdom) Shaun Balfe (United Kingdom) Ben Barnicoat (United Kingdom) Sam Neary (Netherlands) Ruben del Sarte	McLaren M840T 4.0 L Turbo V8	475	+3 Laps
24	P	46	(Belgium) Team WRT	(Switzerland) Raffaele Marciello (Belgium) Maxime Martin (Italy) Valentino Rossi	BMW M4 GT3	475	+3 Laps
24	P	46	(Belgium) Team WRT	(Switzerland) Raffaele Marciello (Belgium) Maxime Martin (Italy) Valentino Rossi	BMW P58 3.0 L Turbo I6	475	+3 Laps
25	S	**3**	**(Germany) GetSpeed**	**(United States) Anthony Bartone (United Kingdom) James Kell (Switzerland) Yannick Mettler (United Kingdom) Aaron Walker**	**Mercedes-AMG GT3 Evo**	**474**	**+4 Laps‡**
25	S	**3**	**(Germany) GetSpeed**	**(United States) Anthony Bartone (United Kingdom) James Kell (Switzerland) Yannick Mettler (United Kingdom) Aaron Walker**	**Mercedes-AMG M159 6.2 L V8**	**474**	**+4 Laps‡**
26	P	23	(China) Phantom Global Racing	(Sweden) Joel Eriksson (New Zealand) Jaxon Evans (Austria) Thomas Preining	Porsche 911 GT3 R (992)	473	+5 Laps
26	P	23	(China) Phantom Global Racing	(Sweden) Joel Eriksson (New Zealand) Jaxon Evans (Austria) Thomas Preining	Porsche M97/80 4.2 L Flat-6	473	+5 Laps
27	S	55	(Italy) Dinamic GT	(Finland) Axel Blom (Norway) Marius Nakken (France) Théo Nouet (Netherlands) Jop Rappange	Porsche 911 GT3 R (992)	473	+5 Laps
27	S	55	(Italy) Dinamic GT	(Finland) Axel Blom (Norway) Marius Nakken (France) Théo Nouet (Netherlands) Jop Rappange	Porsche M97/80 4.2 L Flat-6	473	+5 Laps
28	S	57	(United States) Winward Racing	(Netherlands) "Daan Arrow" (Netherlands) Colin Caresani (Thailand) Tanart Sathienthirakul	Mercedes-AMG GT3 Evo	473	+5 Laps
28	S	57	(United States) Winward Racing	(Netherlands) "Daan Arrow" (Netherlands) Colin Caresani (Thailand) Tanart Sathienthirakul	Mercedes-AMG M159 6.2 L V8	473	+5 Laps
29	PA	**4**	**(United States) CrowdStrike by Riley**	**(United States) Colin Braun (Netherlands) Nicky Catsburg (United Kingdom) Ian James (United States) George Kurtz**	**Mercedes-AMG GT3 Evo**	**472**	**+6 Laps‡**
29	PA	**4**	**(United States) CrowdStrike by Riley**	**(United States) Colin Braun (Netherlands) Nicky Catsburg (United Kingdom) Ian James (United States) George Kurtz**	**Mercedes-AMG M159 6.2 L V8**	**472**	**+6 Laps‡**
30	G	88	(Germany) Tresor Attempto Racing	(Netherlands) Glenn van Berlo (Italy) Lorenzo Ferrari (Italy) Leonardo Moncini (Italy) Lorenzo Patrese	Audi R8 LMS Evo II	472	+6 Laps
30	G	88	(Germany) Tresor Attempto Racing	(Netherlands) Glenn van Berlo (Italy) Lorenzo Ferrari (Italy) Leonardo Moncini (Italy) Lorenzo Patrese	Audi DAR 5.2 L V10	472	+6 Laps
31	S	90	(Argentina) MadPanda Motorsport	(Germany) Patrick Assenheimer (Poland) Karol Basz (Argentina) Ezequiel Pérez Companc (Switzerland) Alain Valente	Mercedes-AMG GT3 Evo	471	+7 Laps
31	S	90	(Argentina) MadPanda Motorsport	(Germany) Patrick Assenheimer (Poland) Karol Basz (Argentina) Ezequiel Pérez Companc (Switzerland) Alain Valente	Mercedes-AMG M159 6.2 L V8	471	+7 Laps
32	S	21	(Belgium) Comtoyou Racing	(United Kingdom) Charles Clark (Belgium) Sam Dejonghe (Belgium) Matisse Lismont (Netherlands) Xavier Maassen	Aston Martin Vantage AMR GT3 Evo	470	+8 Laps
32	S	21	(Belgium) Comtoyou Racing	(United Kingdom) Charles Clark (Belgium) Sam Dejonghe (Belgium) Matisse Lismont (Netherlands) Xavier Maassen	Aston Martin M177 4.0 L Turbo V8	470	+8 Laps
33	B	991	(United Kingdom) Century Motorsport	(United States) Connor De Phillippi (Brazil) Pedro Ebrahim (United Kingdom) Darren Leung (United Kingdom) Toby Sowery	BMW M4 GT3	470	+8 Laps
33	B	991	(United Kingdom) Century Motorsport	(United States) Connor De Phillippi (Brazil) Pedro Ebrahim (United Kingdom) Darren Leung (United Kingdom) Toby Sowery	BMW P58 3.0 L Turbo I6	470	+8 Laps
34	S	26	(France) Saintéloc Racing	(Ukraine) Ivan Klymenko (Norway) Marcus Påverud (Belgium) Gilles Stadsbader (France) Alban Varutti	Audi R8 LMS Evo II	462	+16 Laps
34	S	26	(France) Saintéloc Racing	(Ukraine) Ivan Klymenko (Norway) Marcus Påverud (Belgium) Gilles Stadsbader (France) Alban Varutti	Audi DAR 5.2 L V10	462	+16 Laps
35	B	78	(United Kingdom) Barwell Motorsport	(United Kingdom) Till Bechtolsheimer (United Kingdom) Ricky Collard (France) Antoine Doquin (United Kingdom) Sandy Mitchell	Lamborghini Huracán GT3 Evo2	460	+18 Laps
35	B	78	(United Kingdom) Barwell Motorsport	(United Kingdom) Till Bechtolsheimer (United Kingdom) Ricky Collard (France) Antoine Doquin (United Kingdom) Sandy Mitchell	Lamborghini DGF 5.2 L V10	460	+18 Laps
36	PA	16	(China) Uno Racing Team with Landgraf	(Netherlands) Indy Dontje (China) David Pun (Hong Kong) "Rio" (Hong Kong) Kevin Tse	Mercedes-AMG GT3 Evo	457	+21 Laps
36	PA	16	(China) Uno Racing Team with Landgraf	(Netherlands) Indy Dontje (China) David Pun (Hong Kong) "Rio" (Hong Kong) Kevin Tse	Mercedes-AMG M159 6.2 L V8	457	+21 Laps
37	S	19	(Austria) GRT Grasser Racing Team	(United Kingdom) Hugo Cook (Italy) Mateo Llarena (Belgium) Baptiste Moulin (Kuwait) Haytham Qarajouli	Lamborghini Huracán GT3 Evo2	456	+22 Laps
37	S	19	(Austria) GRT Grasser Racing Team	(United Kingdom) Hugo Cook (Italy) Mateo Llarena (Belgium) Baptiste Moulin (Kuwait) Haytham Qarajouli	Lamborghini DGF 5.2 L V10	456	+22 Laps
38	B	158	(United Kingdom) Garage 59	(United Kingdom) James Baldwin (Denmark) Nicolai Kjærgaard (United Kingdom) Chris Salkeld (United Kingdom) Mark Sansom	McLaren 720S GT3 Evo	454	+24 Laps
38	B	158	(United Kingdom) Garage 59	(United Kingdom) James Baldwin (Denmark) Nicolai Kjærgaard (United Kingdom) Chris Salkeld (United Kingdom) Mark Sansom	McLaren M840T 4.0 L Turbo V8	454	+24 Laps
39	B	188	(United Kingdom) Garage 59	(Germany) Marvin Kirchhöfer (Monaco) Louis Prette (Portugal) Miguel Ramos (United Kingdom) Adam Smalley	McLaren 720S GT3 Evo	451	+27 Laps
39	B	188	(United Kingdom) Garage 59	(Germany) Marvin Kirchhöfer (Monaco) Louis Prette (Portugal) Miguel Ramos (United Kingdom) Adam Smalley	McLaren M840T 4.0 L Turbo V8	451	+27 Laps
40	S	10	(Belgium) Boutsen VDS	(France) Sébastien Baud (France) César Gazeau (United States) Roee Meyuhas (France) Aurélien Panis	Mercedes-AMG GT3 Evo	448	+30 Laps
40	S	10	(Belgium) Boutsen VDS	(France) Sébastien Baud (France) César Gazeau (United States) Roee Meyuhas (France) Aurélien Panis	Mercedes-AMG M159 6.2 L V8	448	+30 Laps
41	PA	100	(United Kingdom) Team RJN	(United Kingdom) Alex Buncombe (United Kingdom) Chris Buncombe (United Kingdom) Josh Caygill (United Kingdom) Jann Mardenborough	McLaren 720S GT3 Evo	445	+33 Laps
41	PA	100	(United Kingdom) Team RJN	(United Kingdom) Alex Buncombe (United Kingdom) Chris Buncombe (United Kingdom) Josh Caygill (United Kingdom) Jann Mardenborough	McLaren M840T 4.0 L Turbo V8	445	+33 Laps
42	G	60	(Bahrain) 2 Seas Motorsport	(Bahrain) Isa Al Khalifa (United Kingdom) Frank Bird (Croatia) Martin Kodrić (United Kingdom) Lewis Williamson	Mercedes-AMG GT3 Evo	430	+48 Laps
42	G	60	(Bahrain) 2 Seas Motorsport	(Bahrain) Isa Al Khalifa (United Kingdom) Frank Bird (Croatia) Martin Kodrić (United Kingdom) Lewis Williamson	Mercedes-AMG M159 6.2 L V8	430	+48 Laps
43	B	8	(Switzerland) Kessel Racing	(Italy) Daniele Di Amato (Italy) David Fumanelli (Switzerland) Nicolò Rosi (Italy) Niccolò Schirò	Ferrari 296 GT3	366	+112 Laps
43	B	8	(Switzerland) Kessel Racing	(Italy) Daniele Di Amato (Italy) David Fumanelli (Switzerland) Nicolò Rosi (Italy) Niccolò Schirò	Ferrari F163CE 3.0 L Turbo V6	366	+112 Laps
44	S	35	(Germany) Walkenhorst Motorsport	(United Kingdom) Lorcan Hanafin (France) Romain Leroux (France) Maxime Robin	Aston Martin Vantage AMR GT3 Evo	363	+115 Laps
44	S	35	(Germany) Walkenhorst Motorsport	(United Kingdom) Lorcan Hanafin (France) Romain Leroux (France) Maxime Robin	Aston Martin M177 4.0 L Turbo V8	363	+115 Laps
45	B	74	(Switzerland) Kessel Racing	(United Kingdom) Matt Bell (United Kingdom) John Hartshorne (United States) Chandler Hull (United Kingdom) Ben Tuck	Ferrari 296 GT3	347	+131 Laps
45	B	74	(Switzerland) Kessel Racing	(United Kingdom) Matt Bell (United Kingdom) John Hartshorne (United States) Chandler Hull (United Kingdom) Ben Tuck	Ferrari F163CE 3.0 L Turbo V6	347	+131 Laps
DNF	P	911	(Lithuania) Pure Rxcing	(Austria) Klaus Bachler (United Kingdom) Alex Malykhin (Germany) Joel Sturm	Porsche 911 GT3 R (992)	306	Accident
DNF	P	911	(Lithuania) Pure Rxcing	(Austria) Klaus Bachler (United Kingdom) Alex Malykhin (Germany) Joel Sturm	Porsche M97/80 4.2 L Flat-6	306	Accident
DNF	B	30	OQ by Oman Racing	(Oman) Ahmad Al Harthy (United Kingdom) Sam De Haan (Germany) Jens Klingmann (Australia) Calan Williams	BMW M4 GT3	294	Mechanical
DNF	B	30	OQ by Oman Racing	(Oman) Ahmad Al Harthy (United Kingdom) Sam De Haan (Germany) Jens Klingmann (Australia) Calan Williams	BMW P58 3.0 L Turbo I6	294	Mechanical
DNF	P	2	(Germany) Mercedes-AMG Team GetSpeed	(Andorra) Jules Gounon (Germany) Fabian Schiller (Germany) Luca Stolz	Mercedes-AMG GT3 Evo	283	Mechanical
DNF	P	2	(Germany) Mercedes-AMG Team GetSpeed	(Andorra) Jules Gounon (Germany) Fabian Schiller (Germany) Luca Stolz	Mercedes-AMG M159 6.2 L V8	283	Mechanical
DNF	P	130	(Hong Kong) Mercedes-AMG Team GruppeM Racing	(Estonia) Ralf Aron (Spain) Daniel Juncadella (Denmark) Frederik Vesti	Mercedes-AMG GT3 Evo	276	Floor damage
DNF	P	130	(Hong Kong) Mercedes-AMG Team GruppeM Racing	(Estonia) Ralf Aron (Spain) Daniel Juncadella (Denmark) Frederik Vesti	Mercedes-AMG M159 6.2 L V8	276	Floor damage
DNF	P	28	(Antigua and Barbuda) HAAS RT	(France) Simon Gachet (Belgium) Jan Heylen (Denmark) Dennis Lind	Audi R8 LMS Evo II	273	Gearbox
DNF	P	28	(Antigua and Barbuda) HAAS RT	(France) Simon Gachet (Belgium) Jan Heylen (Denmark) Dennis Lind	Audi DAR 5.2 L V10	273	Gearbox
DNF	P	71	(Italy) AF Corse - Francorchamps Motors	(Monaco) Vincent Abril (France) Thomas Neubauer (Spain) David Vidales	Ferrari 296 GT3	236	Collision damage
DNF	P	71	(Italy) AF Corse - Francorchamps Motors	(Monaco) Vincent Abril (France) Thomas Neubauer (Spain) David Vidales	Ferrari F163CE 3.0 L Turbo V6	236	Collision damage
DNF	B	36	(Germany) Walkenhorst Motorsport	(United Kingdom) Tim Creswick (United States) Bijoy Garg (United Kingdom) Ben Green (Netherlands) Mex Jansen	Aston Martin Vantage AMR GT3 Evo	231	Accident
DNF	B	36	(Germany) Walkenhorst Motorsport	(United Kingdom) Tim Creswick (United States) Bijoy Garg (United Kingdom) Ben Green (Netherlands) Mex Jansen	Aston Martin M177 4.0 L Turbo V8	231	Accident
DNF	P	48	(United States) Mercedes-AMG Team Mann-Filter	(Austria) Lucas Auer (Germany) Maro Engel (Canada) Daniel Morad	Mercedes-AMG GT3 Evo	222	Collision
DNF	P	48	(United States) Mercedes-AMG Team Mann-Filter	(Austria) Lucas Auer (Germany) Maro Engel (Canada) Daniel Morad	Mercedes-AMG M159 6.2 L V8	222	Collision
DNF	G	111	(France) CSA Racing	(France) Romain Carton (France) Adam Eteki (France) Steven Palette (France) Arthur Rougier	Audi R8 LMS Evo II	174	Puncture
DNF	G	111	(France) CSA Racing	(France) Romain Carton (France) Adam Eteki (France) Steven Palette (France) Arthur Rougier	Audi DAR 5.2 L V10	174	Puncture
DNF	B	91	(Germany) Herberth Motorsport	(Germany) Ralf Bohn (Germany) Alfred Renauer (Germany) Robert Renauer (Netherlands) Morris Schuring	Porsche 911 GT3 R (992)	121	Driveshaft
DNF	B	91	(Germany) Herberth Motorsport	(Germany) Ralf Bohn (Germany) Alfred Renauer (Germany) Robert Renauer (Netherlands) Morris Schuring	Porsche M97/80 4.2 L Flat-6	121	Driveshaft
DNF	P	63	(Italy) Iron Lynx	(Italy) Mirko Bortolotti (Italy) Matteo Cairoli (Italy) Andrea Caldarelli	Lamborghini Huracán GT3 Evo2	120	Accident damage
DNF	P	63	(Italy) Iron Lynx	(Italy) Mirko Bortolotti (Italy) Matteo Cairoli (Italy) Andrea Caldarelli	Lamborghini DGF 5.2 L V10	120	Accident damage
DNF	PA	888	(Australia) Triple Eight JMR	(Malaysia) Prince Jefri Ibrahim (Austria) Martin Konrad (Australia) Jordan Love (United Kingdom) Alexander Sims	Mercedes-AMG GT3 Evo	114	Accident
DNF	PA	888	(Australia) Triple Eight JMR	(Malaysia) Prince Jefri Ibrahim (Austria) Martin Konrad (Australia) Jordan Love (United Kingdom) Alexander Sims	Mercedes-AMG M159 6.2 L V8	114	Accident
DNF	P	22	(France) Schumacher CLRT	(France) Dorian Boccolacci (Turkey) Ayhancan Güven (Germany) Laurin Heinrich	Porsche 911 GT3 R (992)	89	Collision
DNF	P	22	(France) Schumacher CLRT	(France) Dorian Boccolacci (Turkey) Ayhancan Güven (Germany) Laurin Heinrich	Porsche M97/80 4.2 L Flat-6	89	Collision
DNF	P	992	(Chinese Taipei) HubAuto Racing	(France) Kévin Estre (France) Patrick Pilet (Belgium) Laurens Vanthoor	Porsche 911 GT3 R (992)	88	Suspension
DNF	P	992	(Chinese Taipei) HubAuto Racing	(France) Kévin Estre (France) Patrick Pilet (Belgium) Laurens Vanthoor	Porsche M97/80 4.2 L Flat-6	88	Suspension
DNF	S	12	(Belgium) Comtoyou Racing	(Belgium) Nicolas Baert (France) Erwan Bastard (Belgium) Esteban Muth (Denmark) Sebastian Øgaard	Aston Martin Vantage AMR GT3 Evo	79	Collision
DNF	S	12	(Belgium) Comtoyou Racing	(Belgium) Nicolas Baert (France) Erwan Bastard (Belgium) Esteban Muth (Denmark) Sebastian Øgaard	Aston Martin M177 4.0 L Turbo V8	79	Collision
DNF	B	333	(Germany) Rinaldi Racing	(Italy) Fabrizio Crestani (Germany) Felipe Fernández Laser (Germany) Christian Hook (South Africa) David Perel	Ferrari 296 GT3	78	Collision
DNF	B	333	(Germany) Rinaldi Racing	(Italy) Fabrizio Crestani (Germany) Felipe Fernández Laser (Germany) Christian Hook (South Africa) David Perel	Ferrari F163CE 3.0 L Turbo V6	78	Collision
DNF	PA	61	(New Zealand) Earl Bamber Motorsport	(New Zealand) Earl Bamber (Malaysia) Adrian D'Silva (New Zealand) Brendon Leitch (China) Kerong Li	Porsche 911 GT3 R (992)	76	Collision
DNF	PA	61	(New Zealand) Earl Bamber Motorsport	(New Zealand) Earl Bamber (Malaysia) Adrian D'Silva (New Zealand) Brendon Leitch (China) Kerong Li	Porsche M97/80 4.2 L Flat-6	76	Collision
DNF	B	54	(Italy) Dinamic GT	(Germany) Marvin Dienst (Portugal) Guilherme Oliveira (Austria) Philipp Sager (Austria) Christopher Zöchling	Porsche 911 GT3 R (992)	74	Mechanical
DNF	B	54	(Italy) Dinamic GT	(Germany) Marvin Dienst (Portugal) Guilherme Oliveira (Austria) Philipp Sager (Austria) Christopher Zöchling	Porsche M97/80 4.2 L Flat-6	74	Mechanical
DNF	PA	38	(Antigua and Barbuda) HAAS RT	(Lithuania) Julius Adomavičius (Belgium) Olivier Bertels (Belgium) Armand Fumal (Australia) Brad Schumacher	Audi R8 LMS Evo II	73	Accident
DNF	PA	38	(Antigua and Barbuda) HAAS RT	(Lithuania) Julius Adomavičius (Belgium) Olivier Bertels (Belgium) Armand Fumal (Australia) Brad Schumacher	Audi DAR 5.2 L V10	73	Accident
DNF	P	98	(Germany) Rowe Racing	(Austria) Philipp Eng (Germany) Marco Wittmann (United Kingdom) Nick Yelloly	BMW M4 GT3	71	Cooling
DNF	P	98	(Germany) Rowe Racing	(Austria) Philipp Eng (Germany) Marco Wittmann (United Kingdom) Nick Yelloly	BMW P58 3.0 L Turbo I6	71	Cooling
DNF	B	97	(Germany) Rutronik Racing	(United States) Dustin Blattner (Netherlands) Loek Hartog (Germany) Dennis Marschall (Canada) Zacharie Robichon	Porsche 911 GT3 R (992)	18	Collision damage
DNF	B	97	(Germany) Rutronik Racing	(United States) Dustin Blattner (Netherlands) Loek Hartog (Germany) Dennis Marschall (Canada) Zacharie Robichon	Porsche M97/80 4.2 L Flat-6	18	Collision damage
Official results

Icon	Class
**P**	Pro Cup
**G**	Gold Cup
**S**	Silver Cup
**PA**	Pro-Am Cup
**B**	Bronze Cup
