= 2018 Ginetta Junior Championship =

The 2018 Simpson Race Products Ginetta Junior Championship is a multi-event, one make motor racing championship held across England and Scotland. The championship features a mix of professional motor racing teams and privately funded drivers, aged between 14 and 17, competing in Ginetta G40s that conformed to the technical regulations for the championship. It forms part of the extensive program of support categories built up around the British Touring Car Championship centrepiece. It is the twelfth Ginetta Junior Championship, commencing on 8 April 2018 at Brands Hatch – on the circuit's Indy configuration – and concluding on 30 September 2018 at the same venue, utilising the Grand Prix circuit, after 25 races held at ten meetings, all in support of the 2018 British Touring Car Championship.

== Teams and drivers ==
Team	No.	Driver	Rounds
Elite Motorsport	7	(United Kingdom) Greg Johnson	All
Elite Motorsport	17	(United Kingdom) Louis Foster	All
Elite Motorsport	44	(United Kingdom) Finley Green	All
Elite Motorsport	54	(United Kingdom) Adam Smalley	All
Elite Motorsport	67	(United Kingdom) James Hedley	All
Elite Motorsport	81	(United Kingdom) Jonny Wilkinson	1–8
Privateer	10	(United Kingdom) Will Martin	All
Privateer	27	(United Kingdom) Tom Emson	All
Privateer	29	(United Kingdom) Joel Pearson	7, 9–10
Privateer	77	(United Kingdom) Conner Garlick	All
Richardson Racing	11	(United Kingdom) Luke Browning	All
Richardson Racing	66	(United Kingdom) James Taylor	All
Richardson Racing	72	(United Kingdom) Matt Luff	1–7
Richardson Racing	99	(United Kingdom) Emily Linscott	All
Total Control Racing	14	(United Kingdom) Daniel Gale	1–2, 10
Total Control Racing	24	(United Kingdom) Theo Edgerton	10
Total Control Racing	40	(United Kingdom) Ethan Hawkey	1, 6, 8–10
Total Control Racing	49	(United Kingdom) Abbi Pulling	1–3
Total Control Racing	55	(Netherlands) Ruben del Sarte	All
Total Control Racing	87	(United Kingdom) Patrick Kibble	All
Premiership Academy Racing	20	(United Kingdom) Harry Dyson	8–10
Premiership Academy Racing	95	(United Kingdom) Ben O'Hare	All
Douglas Motorsport	23	(United Kingdom) Lorcan Hanafin	5–7, 9–10
Douglas Motorsport	57	(United Kingdom) Gustav Burton	5–7, 9–10
Richardson Chassis Engineering	37	(United Kingdom) Charlie McLeod	1–2
WDE Motorsport	46	(United Kingdom) Jamie Osborne	1–7, 9–10

== Race Calendar ==
Round	Circuit	Date	Pole position	Fastest lap	Winning driver	Winning team
1	Brands Hatch (Indy Circuit, Kent)	7 April	(United Kingdom) Adam Smalley	(Netherlands) Ruben del Sarte	(United Kingdom) Adam Smalley	Elite Motorsport
1	Brands Hatch (Indy Circuit, Kent)	8 April	(United Kingdom) Adam Smalley	(United Kingdom) Luke Browning	(United Kingdom) Luke Browning	Richardson Racing
2	Donington Park (National Circuit, Leicestershire)	28 April	(United Kingdom) Adam Smalley	(United Kingdom) Adam Smalley	(United Kingdom) Luke Browning	Richardson Racing
2	Donington Park (National Circuit, Leicestershire)	28 April	(United Kingdom) Adam Smalley	(United Kingdom) Luke Browning	(United Kingdom) Luke Browning	Richardson Racing
2	Donington Park (National Circuit, Leicestershire)	29 April		(United Kingdom) Louis Foster	(United Kingdom) Louis Foster	Elite Motorsport
3	Thruxton Circuit (Hampshire)	20 May	(United Kingdom) Adam Smalley	(United Kingdom) Finley Green	(United Kingdom) Patrick Kibble	TCR
3	Thruxton Circuit (Hampshire)	20 May	(United Kingdom) Louis Foster	(United Kingdom) James Hedley	(United Kingdom) Adam Smalley	Elite Motorsport
4	Oulton Park (Island Circuit, Cheshire)	9 June	(United Kingdom) Luke Browning	(United Kingdom) Adam Smalley	(United Kingdom) Adam Smalley	Elite Motorsport
4	Oulton Park (Island Circuit, Cheshire)	10 June	(United Kingdom) Luke Browning	(United Kingdom) Adam Smalley	(United Kingdom) Luke Browning	Richardson Racing
5	Croft Circuit (North Yorkshire)	23 June	(United Kingdom) Adam Smalley (Note: Ruben del Sarte qualified fastest but was handed a grid penalty for an infraction from the previous round. Adam Smalley, who was the next fastest qualifier, thus started on pole position.)	(United Kingdom) Adam Smalley	(United Kingdom) Adam Smalley	Elite Motorsport
5	Croft Circuit (North Yorkshire)	23 June	(United Kingdom) Adam Smalley	(United Kingdom) Adam Smalley	(United Kingdom) Adam Smalley	Elite Motorsport
5	Croft Circuit (North Yorkshire)	24 June		(United Kingdom) Luke Browning	(United Kingdom) Finley Green	Elite Motorsport
6	Snetterton Circuit (300 Circuit, Norfolk)	28 July	(United Kingdom) Louis Foster	(United Kingdom) Luke Browning	(United Kingdom) Luke Browning	Richardson Racing
6	Snetterton Circuit (300 Circuit, Norfolk)	28 July	(United Kingdom) Adam Smalley	(United Kingdom) Luke Browning	(United Kingdom) Luke Browning	Richardson Racing
6	Snetterton Circuit (300 Circuit, Norfolk)	29 July		(United Kingdom) Adam Smalley	(United Kingdom) Adam Smalley	Elite Motorsport
7	Rockingham Motor Speedway (International Super Sports Car Circuit, Northamptonshire)	11 August	(United Kingdom) James Hedley	(United Kingdom) James Hedley	(United Kingdom) Louis Foster	Elite Motorsport
7	Rockingham Motor Speedway (International Super Sports Car Circuit, Northamptonshire)	11 August	(United Kingdom) Luke Browning	(United Kingdom) Patrick Kibble	(United Kingdom) Louis Foster	Elite Motorsport
7	Rockingham Motor Speedway (International Super Sports Car Circuit, Northamptonshire)	12 August		(United Kingdom) Louis Foster	(United Kingdom) Luke Browning	Richardson Racing
8	Knockhill Racing Circuit (Fife)	25 August	(United Kingdom) James Hedley	(United Kingdom) Luke Browning	(United Kingdom) Louis Foster	Elite Motorsport
8	Knockhill Racing Circuit (Fife)	26 August	(United Kingdom) Louis Foster	(United Kingdom) Luke Browning	(United Kingdom) Louis Foster	Elite Motorsport
9	Silverstone Circuit (National Circuit, Northamptonshire)	15 September	(Netherlands) Ruben del Sarte	(United Kingdom) Lorcan Hanafin	(United Kingdom) Louis Foster	Elite Motorsport
9	Silverstone Circuit (National Circuit, Northamptonshire)	15 September	(United Kingdom) Luke Browning	(United Kingdom) Gustav Burton	(United Kingdom) Louis Foster	Elite Motorsport
9	Silverstone Circuit (National Circuit, Northamptonshire)	16 September		(United Kingdom) Ethan Hawkey	(United Kingdom) Louis Foster	Elite Motorsport
10	Brands Hatch (Grand Prix Circuit, Kent)	29 September	(United Kingdom) James Hedley	(United Kingdom) Adam Smalley	(United Kingdom) Luke Browning	Richardson Racing
10	Brands Hatch (Grand Prix Circuit, Kent)	29 September	(United Kingdom) Adam Smalley	(United Kingdom) Luke Browning	(United Kingdom) Adam Smalley	Elite Motorsport
10	Brands Hatch (Grand Prix Circuit, Kent)	30 September		(United Kingdom) Ethan Hawkey	(United Kingdom) Louis Foster	Elite Motorsport

== Championship standings ==
Points system
1st	2nd	3rd	4th	5th	6th	7th	8th	9th	10th	11th	12th	13th	14th	15th	16th	17th	18th	19th	20th	R1 PP	FL
35	30	26	22	20	18	16	14	12	11	10	9	8	7	6	5	4	3	2	1	1	1

=== Drivers' championship ===
- A driver's best 24 scores counted towards the championship, with any other points being discarded.

Pos	Driver	BHI		DON			THR		OUL		CRO			SNE			ROC			KNO		SIL			BHGP			Points
1	(United Kingdom) Adam Smalley	1	2	4	2	Ret	2	1	1	6	1	1	6	5	2	1	3	4	3	2	3	Ret	4	2	2	1	5	679
2	(United Kingdom) Louis Foster (R)	4	4	2	3	1	8	3	3	2	5	7	3	4	3	3	1	1	2	1	1	1	1	1	4	2	1	671
3	(United Kingdom) Luke Browning	5	1	1	1	2	3	Ret	DSQ	1	19	2	2	1	1	2	Ret	2	1	4	2	3	3	5	1	4	2	654
4	(United Kingdom) Patrick Kibble (R)	12	6	7	7	4	1	5	6	7	2	5	4	2	10	12	2	6	5	13	8	5	2	3	3	3	3	496
5	(Netherlands) Ruben del Sarte	2	3	5	6	3	4	4	4	Ret	4	3	9	3	Ret	7	8	Ret	8	8	10	4	6	6	8	6	6	425
6	(United Kingdom) James Taylor (R)	11	8	9	5	7	9	7	10	4	3	6	5	11	5	4	7	3	4	3	5	7	9	4	10	5	4	414
7	(United Kingdom) Greg Johnson	6	5	3	Ret	8	5	9	7	3	12	8	17	9	6	5	10	5	6	6	6	Ret	13	11	13	7	14	357
8	(United Kingdom) James Hedley (R)	7	10	8	10	5	6	2	5	12	6	11	10	13	7	6	5	Ret	12	7	4	2	8	18	5	10	18	356
9	(United Kingdom) Finley Green	3	9	6	8	6	Ret	6	2	13	14	4	1	8	16	9	Ret	13	10	Ret	15	6	5	13	7	Ret	11	315
10	(United Kingdom) Jonny Wilkinson (R)	8	11	10	9	14	10	12	8	5	8	9	7	6	12	10	6	8	11	5	7							241
11	(United Kingdom) Tom Emson (R)	15	15	16	11	13	14	10	12	11	9	14	19	19	9	15	9	10	16	9	9	10	10	7	14	12	Ret	217
12	(United Kingdom) Matt Luff	18	7	Ret	4	9	7	8	Ret	Ret	7	10	11	7	4	8	Ret	11	14									189
13	(United Kingdom) Lorcan Hanafin (R)										17	12	8	14	8	11	4	7	9			8	7	9	15	11	Ret	167
14	(United Kingdom) Will Martin (R)	17	16	11	13	12	Ret	13	9	8	13	15	15	16	15	14	Ret	15	13	10	12	Ret	DNS	DNS	Ret	9	9	166
15	(United Kingdom) Conner Garlick (R)	13	17	13	14	15	12	11	15	Ret	18	Ret	13	12	11	Ret	11	12	Ret	Ret	14	15	15	15	9	8	15	164
16	(United Kingdom) Emily Linscott (R)	16	14	Ret	15	18	11	14	11	9	10	17	14	18	Ret	Ret	14	16	15	14	13	12	14	14	16	13	16	159
17	(United Kingdom) Ben O'Hare (R)	14	20	Ret	16	Ret	16	17	14	14	15	16	18	20	17	17	15	Ret	18	15	11	14	16	12	Ret	14	10	123
18	(United Kingdom) Ethan Hawkey (R)	10	12											15	14	13				12	16	11	11	10	11	Ret	8	112
19	(United Kingdom) Gustav Burton (R)										11	18	12	10	Ret	Ret	13	9	7			9	Ret	8	6	Ret	Ret	108
20	(United Kingdom) Jamie Osborne (R)	Ret	18	15	17	17	15	15	13	10	16	13	16	17	13	16	DNS	14	17			16	17	17	18	15	13	100
21	(United Kingdom) Abbi Pulling (R)	9	13	12	12	10	13	16																				62
22	(United Kingdom) Joel Pearson (R)																12	17	Ret			13	12	16	19	Ret	12	46
23	(United Kingdom) Harry Dyson																			11	Ret	Ret	DNS	Ret	12	Ret	7	35
24	(United Kingdom) Daniel Gale (R)	19	Ret	14	18	11																			17	Ret	17	30
25	(United Kingdom) Charlie McLeod (R)	20	19	17	Ret	16																						12
26	(United Kingdom) Theo Edgerton (R)																								Ret	DNS	DNS	0
