= Adam Smalley =

British racing driver

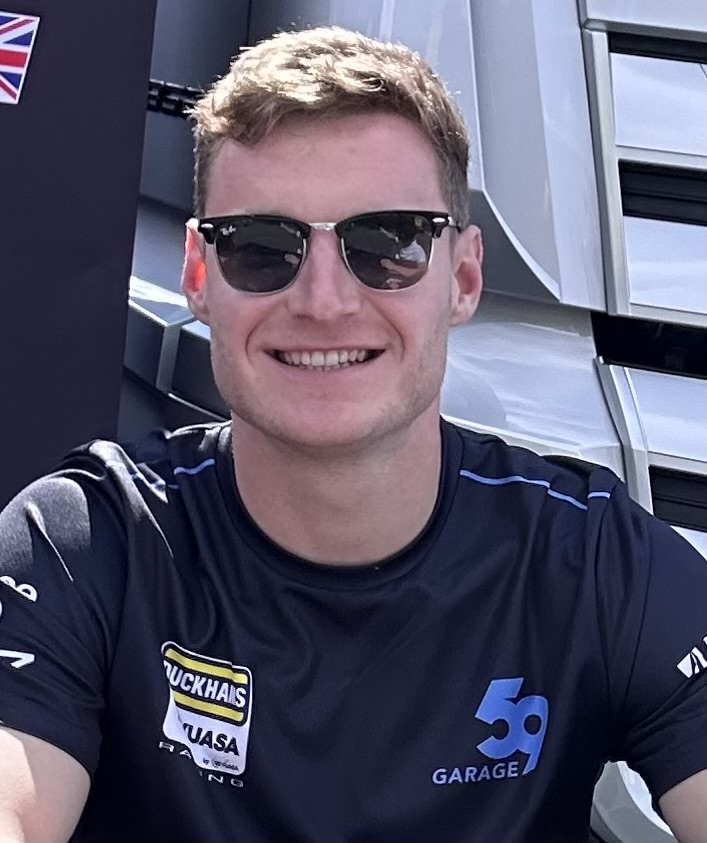
- Smalley in 2024
- Nationality: (United Kingdom) British
- Born: 2 January 2001 (age 25) Poulton-le-Fylde, United Kingdom

GT World Challenge Europe Sprint Cup career
- Debut season: 2025
- Current team: Garage 59
- Categorisation: FIA Silver (until 2024); FIA Gold (2025–)
- Car number: 58
- Starts: 4 (4 entries)
- Wins: 0
- Poles: 0
- Best finish: 7th in 2025

Previous series
- 2024 2022–2023 2020–2021 2019 2017–2018: British GT Championship; Porsche Carrera Cup Great Britain; Ginetta GT4 Supercup; Ginetta GT5 Challenge; Ginetta Junior Championship

Championship titles
- 2024 2023 2021 2018 2017: British GT - Silver-Am; Porsche Carrera Cup Great Britain; Ginetta GT4 Supercup Pro; Ginetta Junior Championship; Ginetta Junior Winter Series

Awards
- 2022-2023: Porsche Carrera Cup GB Junior Driver

Adam Smalley (born 2 January 2001 in Poulton-le-Fylde, England) is a British racing driver currently competing in the 2025 GT World Challenge Europe Sprint Cup with Garage 59.

Making his car racing debut in 2017, Smalley has won titles in Ginetta Juniors, Ginetta GT4 Supercup and Porsche Carrera Cup Great Britain. He won the 2022-2023 Porsche Carrera Cup GB Junior Driver Award in November 2021, succeeding Harry King. He is a member of the Motorsport UK Academy and is a McLaren Junior Pro Driver.

== Career ==
=== Karting ===
Born in 2001 in Poulton-le-Fylde, Smalley made his karting debut in 2011 at the Trent Valley Kart Club at the age of ten. Throughout his six-year karting campaign, he won titles such as the MSA E Plate Rotax Junior series, and the 2016 Rotax Max Wintercup in the Rotax Max Junior class.

=== Ginetta Junior Championship ===
Smalley made his car racing debut in the 2017 Ginetta Junior Championship, racing with JHR Developments. In this year, he finished seventh in the standings, with a podium and a fastest lap. At the end of the year, he competed in the Winter Series at Brands Hatch, winning the title with two wins and four podiums in the four races.

Smalley continued in the series in 2018, this time switching teams to Elite Motorsport. He dominated this year, winning eight races and picking up nine pole positions to win the title by eight points.

=== Ginetta GT5 Challenge ===
In 2019, Smalley moved up to the Ginetta GT5 Challenge, again with Elite Motorsport. Winning two of the three races during the first round at Oulton Park, he continued through the season with two further wins and ten podiums to finish second in the standings, 49 points behind champion Scott McKenna.

=== Ginetta GT4 Supercup ===
In 2020, Smalley switched to the Ginetta GT4 Supercup, competing with Elite Motorsport. With four wins, he finished fourth in the standings with 462 points.

Smalley continued in the championship in 2021, again with Elite Motorsport. Winning seven races and picking up 13 podiums, he won the title by 51 points.

=== Porsche Carrera Cup Great Britain ===
In November 2021, it was announced that Smalley was the 2022-2023 Porsche Carrera Cup GB Junior Driver, following a shootout day earlier in the month. Succeeding Harry King, he made his debut in the series in 2022, driving for Duckhams Yuasa Racing. In the opening race of the season, he took his maiden win. He finished the season as runner-up, taking nine additional podiums besides his win.

Smalley continued in the series for 2023 with Duckhams Yuasa Racing-affiliated Team Parker Racing. The season started successfully as he claimed his maiden pole position at Donington Park. Although he fell to second in race one, which was held on a drying track, he moved up from fourth to first in the wet race two. His second win of the season came at Oulton Park. After qualifying third, he finished second in race one despite damage on the opening lap that affected the car's handling, but had a clean race two to finish on the top step of the podium and extend his championship lead. The second Donington Park round saw him take pole position, and even though he slipped down to third place in race one, he bounced back to win race two. With a second-place finish in race one at Silverstone, third place in race two was enough for Smalley to secure the championship title with one round still to go. Despite having the championship wrapped up, he still put on a strong performance in Brands Hatch to win the final race of the season. He finished with four wins and ten additional podiums and never finished below fourth position in a year that he described as "the best season of [his] life."

=== Porsche Supercup ===
Smalley raced in the Silverstone round of the 2022 Porsche Supercup as a guest driver, driving for Duckhams Yuasa Racing with CLRT, where he finished 12th. He also made a guest appearance in the 2023 edition with the same team. He stalled at the start of the race, but recovered well to regain 16 positions and finish 12th.

=== British GT Championship ===
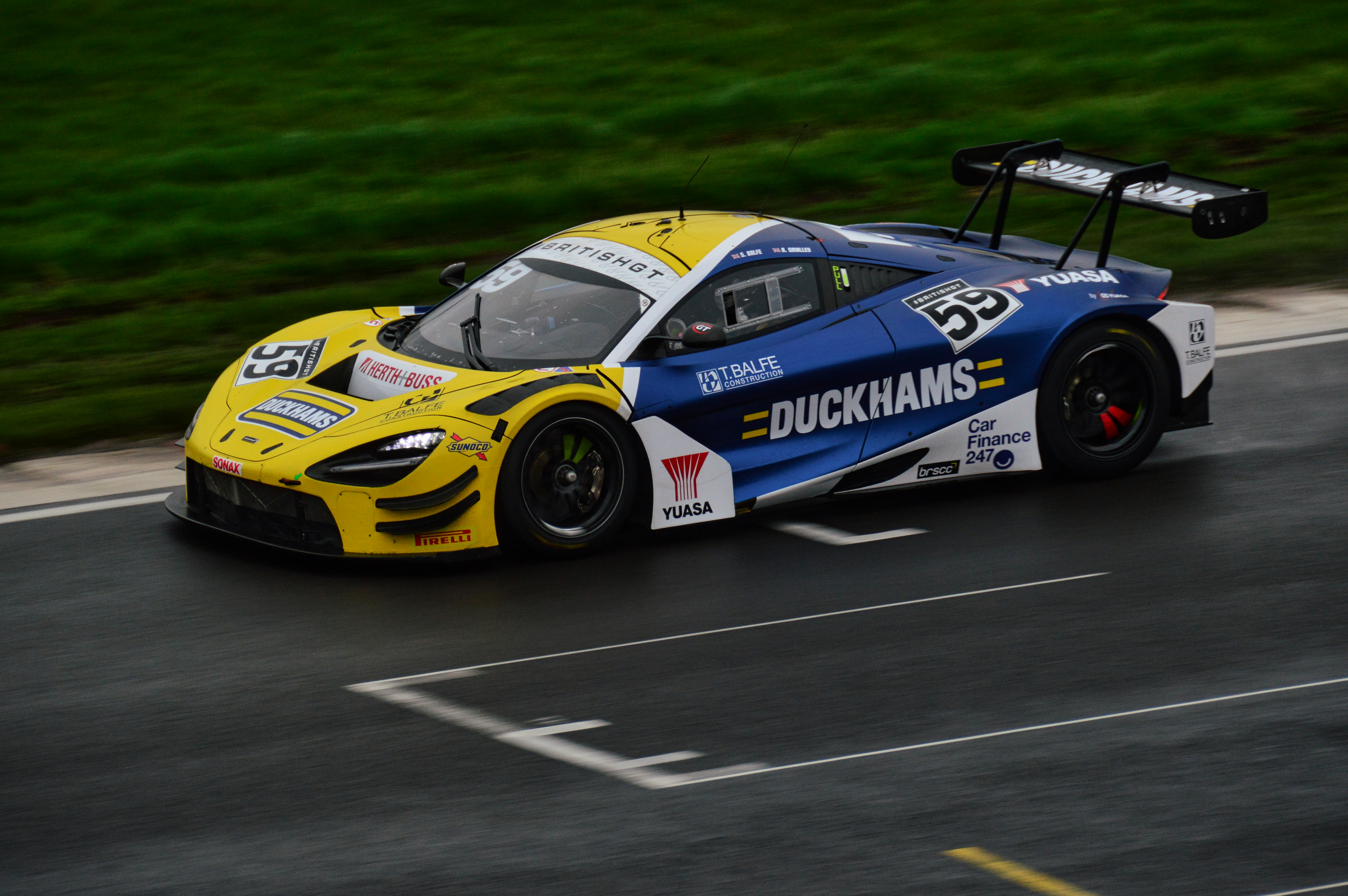
Smalley testing his Garage 59 McLaren at Donington Park in 2024.

Smalley joined Garage 59 for the 2024 British GT Championship, driving alongside Shaun Balfe. Their first win came at Silverstone, where they timed their pit stops well and took advantage of incidents in front to move from fourth to the top step of the podium. The pair won the Silver-Am category, but only finished third in the overall standings.

=== GT World Challenge Europe ===
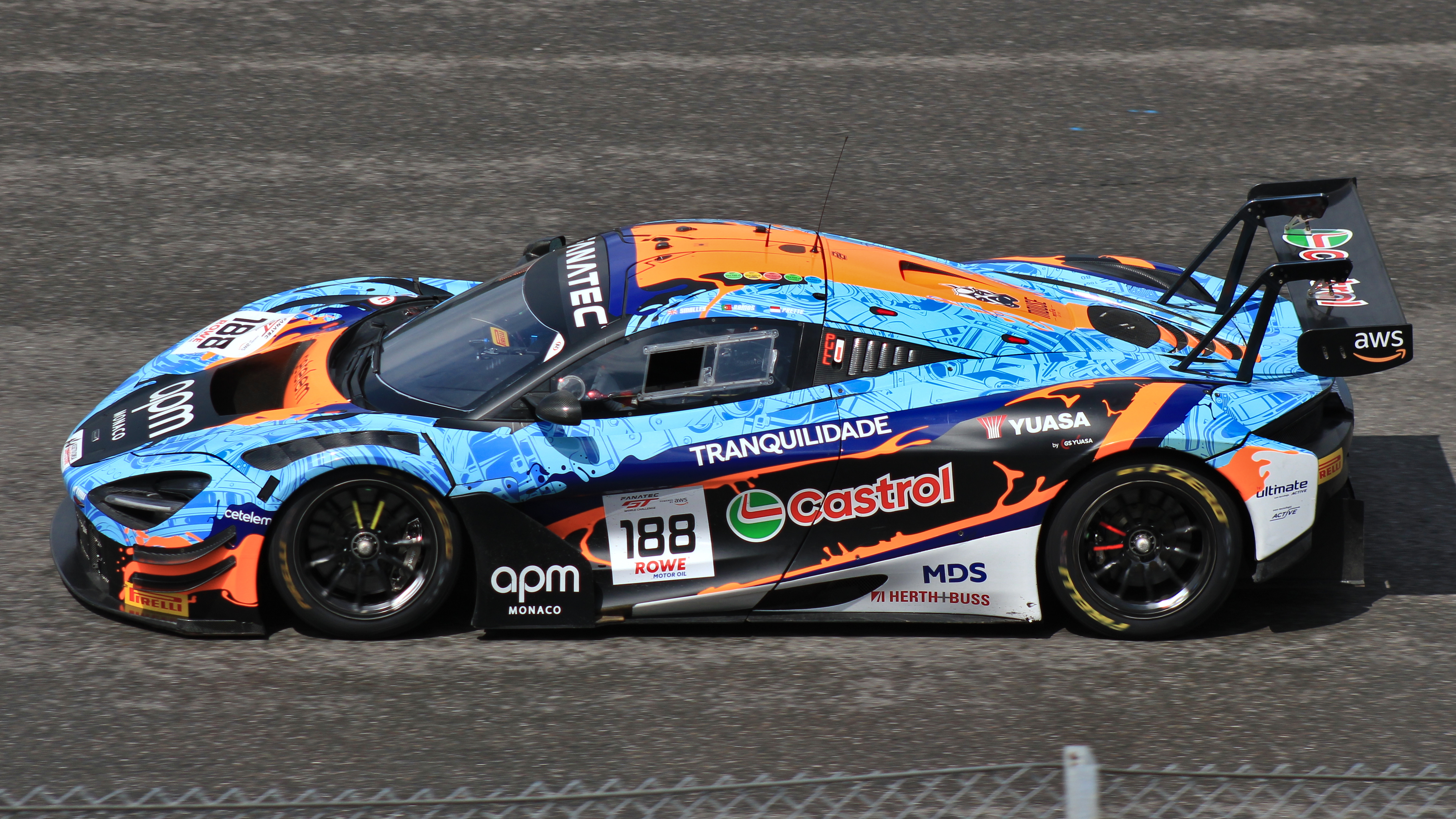
Smalley racing for Garage 59 at the Nürburgring in 2024.

Smalley competed in the 2024 GT World Challenge Europe Endurance Cup with Garage 59. The team was not classified in the overall standings, but he finished 27th in the Bronze Cup alongside Louis Prette, with a highlight being class pole position at the 24 Hours of Spa.

In 2025, Smalley competed in the Gold Cup class of the GT World Challenge Europe Sprint Cup with Garage 59. As part of this deal, he became a McLaren Junior Pro Driver.

== Karting record ==
=== Karting career summary ===
Season	Series	Team	Position
2011	Trent Valley Kart Club - Comer Cadet		18th
2012	Trent Valley Kart Club - Comer Cadet		5th
2012	Kartmasters British Grand Prix - Comer Cadet		13th
2013	Trent Valley Kart Club - Minimax		33rd
2013	Super 1 National Rotax Mini Max Championship		17th
2014	Super 1 National Rotax Mini Max Championship		4th
2014	SKUSA SuperNationals XVIII - TaG Junior		50th
2015	Super 1 National Rotax Max Junior		18th
2015	SKUSA SuperNationals XIX - TaG Senior	Smak Racing	77th
2015	MSA E Plate - Rotax Junior		1st
2016	British Open Championship - Rotax Max Junior		5th
2016	Rotax Max Wintercup - Rotax Max Junior	Coles Racing	1st

== Racing record ==
=== Racing career summary ===
Season	Series	Team	Races	Wins	Poles	F/Laps	Podiums	Points	Position
2017	Ginetta Junior Championship	JHR Developments	17	0	0	1	1	377	7th
2017	Ginetta Junior Championship	HHC Motorsport	9	0	0	0	0	377	7th
2017	Ginetta Junior Winter Series	Elite Motorsport	4	2	1	0	4	130	**1st**
2018	Ginetta Junior Championship	Elite Motorsport	25	8	9	6	17	593	**1st**
2019	Ginetta GT5 Challenge	Elite Motorsport	17	4	1	1	10	308	**2nd**
2020	Ginetta GT4 Supercup - Pro	Elite Motorsport	19	4	1	5	10	462	4th
2021	Ginetta GT4 Supercup - Pro	Elite Motorsport	20	8	4	2	16	628	**1st**
2022	Porsche Carrera Cup Great Britain - Pro	Duckhams Yuasa Racing	16	1	0	2	10	103	**2nd**
2022	Porsche Supercup	Duckhams Yuasa Racing with CLRT	1	0	0	0	0	0	NC†
2023	Porsche Carrera Cup Great Britain - Pro	Team Parker Racing	16	4	3	5	14	129	**1st**
2023	Porsche Supercup	Team Parker Racing	1	0	0	0	0	0	NC†
2023	Porsche Sprint Challenge Southern Europe - Sport Division - Pro	Team Parker Racing	6	0	0	0	3	71	**3rd**
2023	Porsche Carrera Cup Germany	Proton Competition	5	0	0	0	0	0	37th
2024	British GT Championship - GT3	Garage 59	9	1	0	1	3	140	**3rd**
2024	GT World Challenge Europe Endurance Cup	Garage 59	5	0	0	0	0	0	NC
2024	Gulf 12 Hours - Pro-Am	Garage 59	1	1	0	0	1	N/A	**1st**
2025	GT World Challenge Europe Endurance Cup	Garage 59	5	1	1	1	1	26	12th
2025	GT World Challenge Europe Sprint Cup	Garage 59	4	0	0	0	0	2	26th
2025	GT World Challenge Europe Sprint Cup - Gold	Garage 59	4	0	0	0	1	25.5	7th
2025	Britcar Endurance Championship – Challenge	Amspeed	8	5	1	2	8	308‡	**1st‡**
2026	GT World Challenge Europe Endurance Cup	Optimum Motorsport	5	0	0	0	0	0	NC

^{†} As Smalley was a guest driver, he was ineligible for championship points.

=== Complete Ginetta Junior Championship results ===
(key) (Races in bold indicate pole position) (Races in italics indicate fastest lap)

Year	Team	1	2	3	4	5	6	7	8	9	10	11	12	13	14	15	16	17	18	19	20	21	22	23	24	25	26	Pos	Points
2017	JHR Developments	BHI; 1; 6	BHI; 2; 7	DON; 1; 7	DON; 2; 8	DON; 3; 15	THR; 1; 6	THR; 2; 17	OUL; 1; 13	OUL; 2; 6	CRO; 1; 8	CRO; 2; 7	CRO; 3; 5	SNE; 1; 4	SNE; 2; 2	SNE; 3; 4	KNO; 1; 5	KNO; 2; 10										7th	377
2017	HHC Motorsport																		ROC; 1; 5	ROC; 2; 7	ROC; 3; 11	SIL; 1; 5	SIL; 2; 12	SIL; 3; 6	BHGP; 1; 4	BHGP; 2 Ret	BHGP; 3 Ret	7th	377
2018	Elite Motorsport	**BHI**; **1**; 1	**BHI**; **2**; 2	**DON**; **1**; 4	**DON**; **2**; 2	DON; 3 Ret	**THR1**; **1**; 2	THR1; 2; 1	OUL; 1; 1	OUL; 2; 6	**CRO**; **1**; 1	**CRO**; **2**; 1	**CRO**; **3**; 6	SNE; 1; 5	**SNE**; **2**; 2	SNE; 3; 1	ROC; 1; 3	ROC; 2; 4	ROC; 3; 3	KNO; 1; 2	KNO; 2; 3	SIL; 1 Ret	SIL; 2; 4	SIL; 3; 2	BHGP; 1; 2	**BHGP**; **2**; 1	**BHGP**; **3**; 5	1st	679

=== Complete Ginetta GT4 Supercup results ===
(key) (Races in bold indicate pole position) (Races in italics indicate fastest lap)

Year	Entrant	1	2	3	4	5	6	7	8	9	10	11	12	13	14	15	16	17	18	19	20	21	22	23	DC	Points
2020	Elite Motorsport	DON; 1; 4	DON; 2; 4	DON; 3; 10	BHGP; 1; 4	BHGP; 2; 4	**BHGP**; **3**; 1	OUL; 1; 4	OUL; 2; 3	THR; 1 Ret	THR; 2; 2	THR; 3; 4	CRO; 1; 2	CRO; 2; 2	CRO; 3; 1	SNE; 1; 3	SNE; 2; 1	SNE; 3; 4	**BHI**; **1**; 1	**BHI**; **2**; 3					4th	462
2021	Elite Motorsport	**SNE**; **1**; 1	**SNE**; **2**; 1	SNE; 3 Ret	BHI; 1; 2	BHI; 2; 1	BHI; 3; 5	**OUL**; **1**; 12	OUL; 2; 6	**KNO**; **1**; 1	**KNO**; **2**; 1	KNO; 3; 5	**THR**; **1**; 1	**THR**; **2**; 1	THR; 3; 2	CRO; 1; 2	CRO; 2; 2	CRO; 3; 3	DON; 1; 3	DON; 2; 2	DON; 3; 4	BHGP; 1; 5	BHGP; 2; 4	BHGP; 3; 3	1st	628

=== Complete Porsche Carrera Cup Great Britain results ===
(key) (Races in bold indicate pole position) (Races in italics indicate fastest lap)

Year	Entrant	Class	1		2		3		4		5		6		7		8		Pos.	Points
2022	Duckhams Yuasa Racing	Pro	DON; 1; 1	DON; 2; 4	BRH; 1; 8	BRH; 2; 3	OUL; 1; 2	OUL; 2; 4	KNO; 1; 4	KNO; 2; 2	SNE; 1; 7	SNE; 2; 7	THR; 1; 3	THR; 2; 2	SIL; 1; 3	SIL; 2; 7	BRH; 1; 3	BRH; 2; 3	2nd	103
2023	Team Parker Racing	Pro	**DON**; **1**; 2	DON; 2; 1	BRH; 1; 2	BRH; 2; 4	THR; 1; 2	THR; 2; 3	OUL; 1; 2	OUL; 2; 1	KNO; 1; 2	KNO; 2; 3	**DON**; **1**; 3	DON; 2; 1	SIL; 1; 2	SIL; 2; 3	BRH; 1; 4	**BRH**; **2**; 1	1st	141

=== Complete Porsche Supercup results ===
(key) (Races in bold indicate pole position) (Races in italics indicate fastest lap)

Year	Team	1	2	3	4	5	6	7	8	Pos.	Points
2022	Duckhams Yuasa Racing with CLRT	IMO	MON	SIL; 12	RBR	LEC	SPA	ZND	MNZ	NC†	0
2023	Team Parker Racing	MON	RBR	SIL; 12	HUN	SPA	ZND	ZND	MNZ	NC‡	0

^{†} As Smalley was a guest driver, he was ineligible to score points.

=== Complete GT World Challenge Europe results ===
==== GT World Challenge Europe Endurance Cup ====
(key) (Races in bold indicate pole position) (Races in italics indicate fastest lap)

Year	Team	Car	Class	1	2	3	4	5	6	7	Pos.	Points
2024	Garage 59	McLaren 720S GT3 Evo	Bronze	**LEC**; 38	SPA; 6H; 46	SPA; 12H; 42	**SPA**; **24H**; 39	NÜR; 34	MNZ; Ret		27th	11
2024	Garage 59	McLaren 720S GT3 Evo	Pro							JED; 16	NC	0
2025	Garage 59	McLaren 720S GT3 Evo	Gold	**LEC**; Ret	**MNZ**; Ret	SPA; 6H; 28	SPA; 12H; 15	SPA; 24H; 12	**NÜR**; Ret	**CAT**; 1	4th	58
2026	Optimum Motorsport	McLaren 720S GT3 Evo	Gold	LEC; 45	MNZ; Ret	SPA; 6H; 47	SPA; 12H; 37	SPA; 24H; 24	NÜR; 28	ALG; 27	8th	48

==== GT World Challenge Europe Sprint Cup ====
(key) (Races in bold indicate pole position) (Races in italics indicate fastest lap)

Year	Team	Car	Class	1	2	3	4	5	6	7	8	9	10	Pos.	Points
2025	Garage 59	McLaren 720S GT3 Evo	Gold	BRH; 1; 8	BRH; 2; 15	ZAN; 1 Ret	ZAN; 2; 25	MIS; 1	MIS; 2	MAG; 1	MAG; 2	VAL; 1	VAL; 2	7th	25.5

=== Complete British GT Championship results ===
(key) (Races in bold indicate pole position) (Races in italics indicate fastest lap)

Year	Team	Car	Class	1	2	3	4	5	6	7	8	9	DC	Points
2024	Garage 59	McLaren 720S GT3 Evo	GT3	OUL; 1; 5	OUL; 2; 4	SIL; 1; 1	DON; 1; 8	SPA; 1; 2	SNE; 1; 10	SNE; 2; 4	DON; 1; 3	BRH; 1; 8	3rd	140

Sporting positions
Preceded by Sebastian Priaulx	Ginetta Junior Winter Series; Champion; 2017	Succeeded by James Hedley
Preceded by Tom Gamble	Ginetta Junior Championship; Champion; 2018	Succeeded by James Hedley
Preceded by Will Burns	Ginetta GT4 Supercup; Champion; 2021	Succeeded by James Kellett (G56 Pro)
Preceded by Kiern Jewiss	Porsche Carrera Cup GB; Champion; 2023	Succeeded by George Gamble
Preceded by Mark Sansom; Will Tregurtha	British GT Championship; Silver-Am Champion; 2024; With: Shaun Balfe	Succeeded by Andrew Howard; Tom Wood
