= Tom Emson =

British racing driver (born 2002)

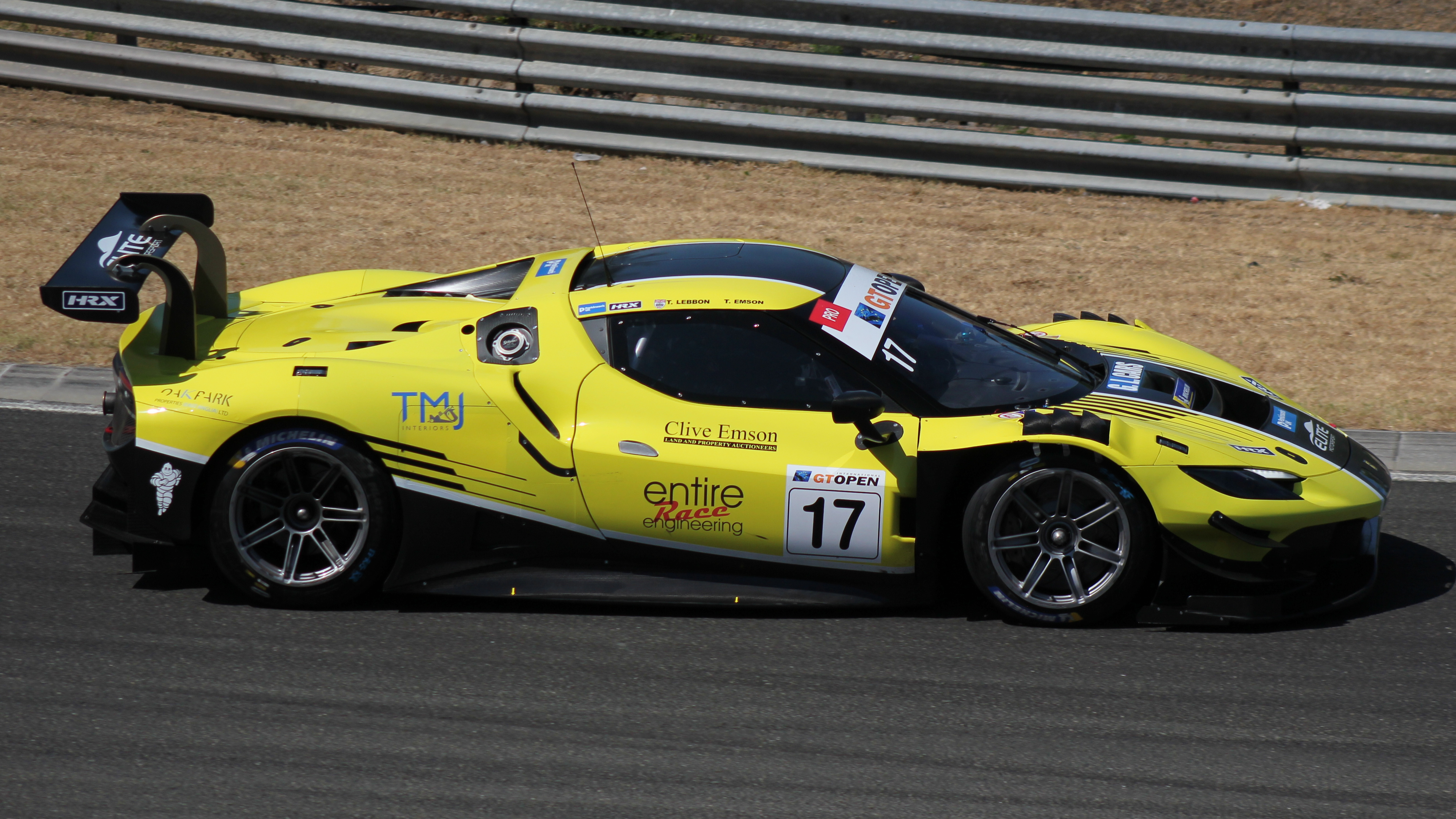
- Emson in 2025
- Nationality: (United Kingdom) British
- Born: Thomas Robert Emson; 27 July 2002 (age 24) Ashford, Kent, England
- Categorisation: FIA Silver

Championship titles
- 2026: International GT Open

Thomas Robert Emson (born 27 July 2002) is a British racing driver who last competed for Elite Motorsport with Entire Race Engineering in International GT Open.

== Career ==
Emson began his car racing career in 2017, competing in the Ginetta Junior Winter Series for Elite Motorsport. Racing in the following year's main season as a privateer, Emson scored a best result of seventh at Silverstone to end the season 11th overall. At the end of the year, Emson returned to the championship's Winter Series, taking two podiums and finishing third in the overall standings.

In 2019, Emson reunited with Elite for his second season in the Ginetta Junior Championship, scoring his maiden career win at Brands Hatch but ending the season 11th again as he skipped the final two rounds to make his Ginetta GT4 Supercup debut. Continuing with Elite for his first full-season in Ginetta GT4 Supercup the following year, Emson primarily raced in Pro-Am, scoring ten wins and five other podiums to take third in the class standings. Remaining with the team for his full-time debut in the Pro class in 2021, Emson took his maiden overall win at the Brands Hatch finale and five other podiums en route to a sixth-place points finish.

The following year, Emson continued in Ginetta GT4 Supercup in the newly-created G56 Pro class, scoring five outright wins and ten more podiums to secure runner-up honours behind James Kellett. Following the demise of the Ginetta GT4 Supercup series, Emson switched to the GT4 European Series in 2023, as he partnered up with Josh Rattican to drive Elite's McLaren Artura GT4. In his rookie season in the series, Emson took a lone win at Barcelona from pole to take seventh in the Silver Cup standings. During 2023, Emson also made his debut in GT3 machinery in a one-off appearance for 7TSIX in the GT Cup Championship at Snetterton, in which he won race three. In 2024, Emson continued with Elite in GT4 Europe, this time paired up with Alex Denning, taking a lone podium at Jeddah as he fell to 12th in the Silver Cup points.

Remaining with Elite for his full-time step-up to GT3 machinery in 2025, Emson joined Tom Lebbon for the team's first season in International GT Open in their Ferrari 296 GT3. After starting the season with a pair of third-place finishes at Portimao and Hockenheimring, Emson took his maiden series win in race one at the Hungaroring from pole. In the remaining four rounds, the duo scored a pair of second-place finishes at the Red Bull Ring and Monza, helping them end the year fourth in the overall standings. Continuing in International GT Open for a second season the following year, Emson and Lebbon opened up the season with podiums at Algarve and Spa, before winning both Misano races and jumping to the points lead. Emson then won a race in each of the next three rounds at the Hungaroring, Le Castellet and the Hockenheimring, before finishing on the podium at the Barcelona finale to seal the International GT Open title.

== Racing record ==
=== Racing career summary ===
Season	Series	Team	Races	Wins	Poles	F/Laps	Podiums	Points	Position
2017	Ginetta Junior Winter Series	Elite Motorsport	4	0	0	0	0	25	14th
2018	Ginetta Junior Championship	Privateer	26	0	0	0	0	217	11th
2018	Ginetta Junior Winter Series	Privateer	3	0	0	1	2	79	**3rd**
2019	Ginetta Junior Championship	Elite Motorsport	20	1	0	0	1	229	11th
2019	Ginetta GT4 Supercup – Pro	Elite Motorsport	6	0	0	0	0	56	14th
2020	Ginetta GT4 Supercup – Pro	Elite Motorsport	3	0	0	0	0	26	11th
2020	Ginetta GT4 Supercup – Pro-Am	Elite Motorsport	16	11	10	10	15	513	**3rd**
2021	Ginetta GT4 Supercup – Pro	Elite Motorsport	23	1	1	1	6	403	6th
2022	Ginetta GT4 Supercup – G56 Pro	Elite Motorsport	20	5	1	4	15	531	**2nd**
2023	GT4 European Series – Silver	Elite Motorsport with Entire Race Engineering	12	1	0	0	1	55	9th
2023	GT Cup Championship – GT3	7TSIX	4	1	2	1	4	0	NC†
2024	GT4 Winter Series – Pro	Elite Motorsport	3	0	0	0	1	13	7th
2024	GT4 European Series – Silver	Elite Motorsport with Entire Race Engineering	12	0	0	0	1	41	12th
2025	International GT Open	Elite Motorsport with Entire Race Engineering	14	1	0	0	5	123	4th
2026	International GT Open	Elite Motorsport with Entire Race Engineering	14	5	3	2	8	148	**1st**

* Season still in progress.

^{†} As Emson was a guest driver, he was ineligible for points.

=== Complete Ginetta Junior Championship results ===
(key) (Races in bold indicate pole position) (Races in italics indicate fastest lap)

Year	Team	1	2	3	4	5	6	7	8	9	10	11	12	13	14	15	16	17	18	19	20	21	22	23	24	25	26	27	DC	Points
2018	Privateer	BHI; 1; 15	BHI; 2; 15	DON; 1; 16	DON; 2; 11	DON; 3; 13	THR1; 1; 14	THR1; 2; 10	OUL; 1; 12	OUL; 2; 11	CRO; 1; 9	CRO; 2; 14	CRO; 3; 19	SNE; 1; 19	SNE; 2; 9	SNE; 3; 15	ROC; 1; 9	ROC; 2; 10	ROC; 3; 16	KNO; 1; 9	KNO; 2; 9	SIL; 1; 10	SIL; 2; 10	SIL; 3; 7	BHGP; 1; 14	BHGP; 2; 12	BHGP; 3 Ret		11th	217
2019	Elite Motorsport	BHI; 1; 8	BHI; 2; 1	DON; 1; 19	DON; 2; 14	DON; 3; 8	THR1; 1; 7	THR1; 2; 7	CRO; 1 C	CRO; 2; 19	OUL; 1; 7	OUL; 2; 13	SNE; 1; 14	SNE; 2; 7	SNE; 3; 13	SNE; 4; 21	THR2; 1; 10	THR2; 2 Ret	THR2; 3; 7	KNO; 1; 14	KNO; 2; 6	KNO; 3; 7	SIL; 1	SIL; 2	SIL; 3	BHGP; 1	BHGP; 2	BHGP; 3	11th	229

=== Complete GT4 European Series results ===
(key) (Races in bold indicate pole position) (Races in italics indicate fastest lap)

Year	Team	Car	Class	1	2	3	4	5	6	7	8	9	10	11	12	Pos	Points
2023	Elite Motorsport with Entire Race Engineering	McLaren Artura GT4	Silver	MNZ; 1; 7	MNZ; 2; 35	LEC; 1 Ret	LEC; 2; 5	SPA; 1; 25	SPA; 2; 40	MIS; 1; 20	MIS; 2; 26	HOC; 1; 5	HOC; 2; 14	CAT; 1; 1	CAT; 2; 37†	9th	55
2024	Elite Motorsport with Entire Race Engineering	McLaren Artura GT4	Silver	LEC; 1; 22	LEC; 2; 16	MIS; 1 Ret	MIS; 2; 36	SPA; 1; 28	SPA; 2; 34	HOC; 1 Ret	HOC; 2; 40†	MNZ; 1; 4	MNZ; 2; 5	JED; 1; 2	JED; 2; 10	12th	41

=== Complete International GT Open results ===
(key) (Races in bold indicate pole position) (Races in italics indicate fastest lap)

Year	Team	Car	Class	1	2	3	4	5	6	7	8	9	10	11	12	13	14	Pos.	Points
2025	Elite Motorsport with Entire Race Engineering	Ferrari 296 GT3	Pro	ALG; 1; 5	ALG; 2; 3	SPA; 7	HOC; 1; 3	HOC; 2; 4	**HUN**; **1**; 1	HUN; 2; 4	LEC; 1; 5	LEC; 2; 4	RBR; 1; 25	RBR; 2; 2	CAT; 1 Ret	CAT; 2; 4	MNZ; 2	4th	123
2026	Elite Motorsport with Entire Race Engineering	Ferrari 296 GT3 Evo	Pro	ALG; 1; 4	ALG; 2; 3	SPA; 2	MIS; 1; 1	**MIS**; **2**; 1	HUN; 1; 25†	**HUN**; **2**; 1	LEC; 1 Ret	**LEC**; **2**; 1	HOC; 1; 6	HOC; 2; 1	MNZ; 4	CAT; 1; 14	CAT; 2; 3	1st	148
