= Sebastian Melrose =

Scottish racing driver

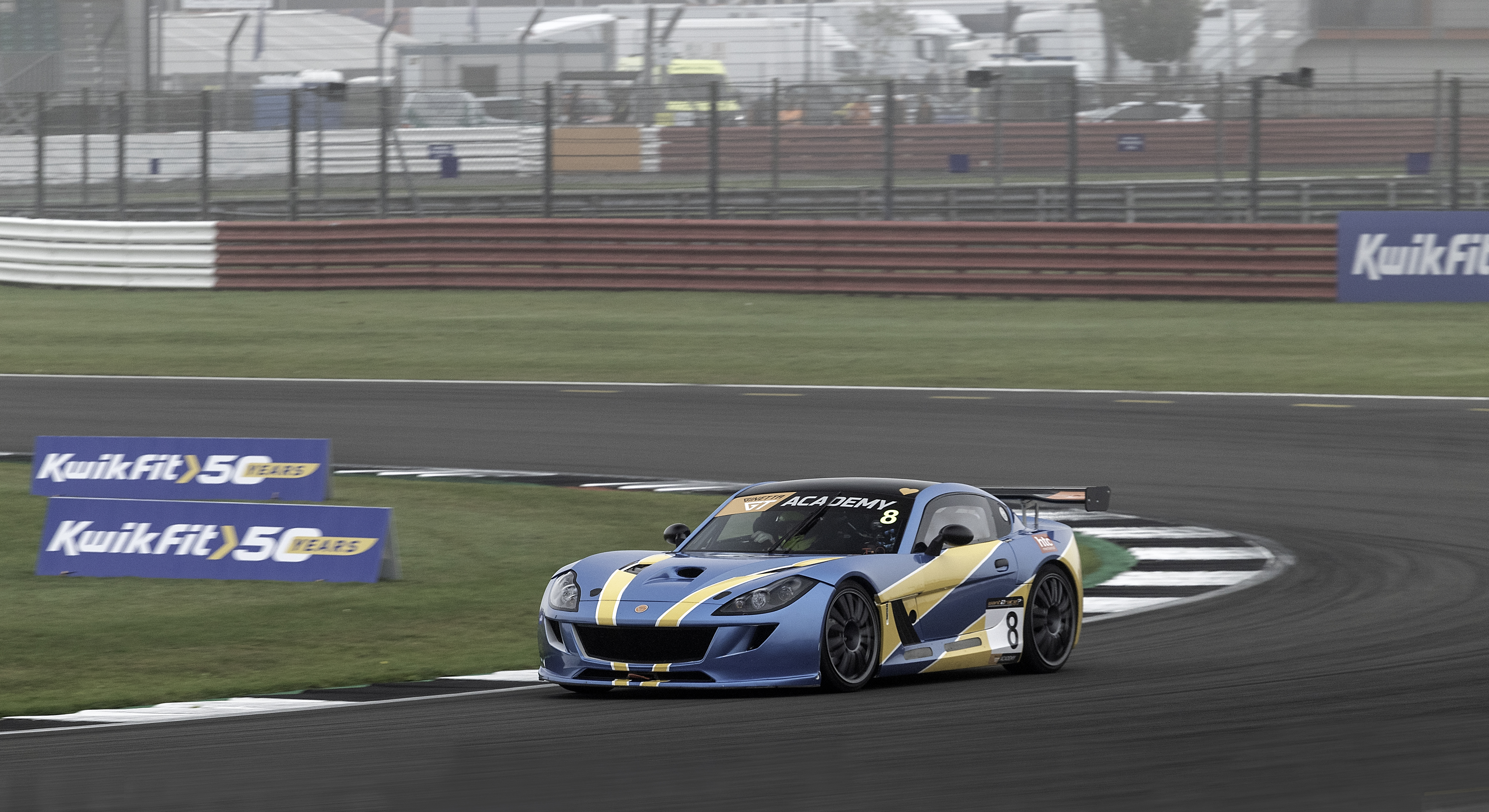
- Nationality: (Scotland) Scottish
- Born: 12 January 1998 (age 28) Bathgate, United Kingdom

Ginetta GT4 Supercup career
- Debut season: 2021
- Current team: Team HARD.
- Car number: 69
- Starts: 17
- Wins: 0
- Poles: 0
- Best finish: 14th in 2021

Previous series
- 2019 2014-2018: VLN Series; Formula Ford

Sebastian Melrose (born 12 January 1998) is a Scottish racing driver who last competed in the Ginetta GT4 Supercup for Team HARD. He was born in Bathgate, Scotland. He is a holder of the Scottish Motor Racing Club (SMRC) rising star award, winner of the Ecurie Ecosse Hubcap and is also the godson of four-time IndyCar Series champion and three-time Indy 500 champion Dario Franchitti. He is also known for appearing on the fourth season of the Netflix reality show Too Hot To Handle.

== Career ==
At the age of 16, Melrose's first race was at Knockhill in Scotland, in March 2014, which was followed by his first away race at Brands Hatch later that year, in October 2014. There, he entered the Formula Ford Festival, progressing to the festival's final with a notable a top-20 finish. He became the youngest driver to have achieved the feat, and was awarded the SMRC rising star award for Formula Ford 1600 as a result, along with his professional approach away from the car.

Previously racing in the Formula Ford 1600 series with the Graham Brunton Racing team, Melrose finished his second season fifth in the championship standings with 140 points. In 2016, he finished third and won the SMRC Best Young Single Seater Driver accolade. In 2017, Melrose finished second in the Scottish Championship, winning the David Leslie Trophy along the way. In the same season, he won Champion of Brands while racing at Brands Hatch circuit. Another second place was secured in the 2018 season.

In April 2019, Melrose took the step into closed wheel racing by joining Walkenhorst Motorsport in Germany to race a BMW in the VLN Series at the Nordschleife Nurburgring.

In 2021, Melrose would make the step-up to the Ginetta GT4 Supercup, racing with Team HARD.

== Personal life ==
Melrose was born in Scotland to a Scottish father and Salvadoran mother.

== Racing record ==
=== Racing career summary ===
Season	Series	Team	Races	Wins	Poles	F/Laps	Podiums	Points	Position
2014	Formula Ford 1600 Scotland		14	0	0	0	0	81	19th
2014	Formula Ford Festival - Kent		1	0	0	0	0	0	31st
2015	Formula Ford 1600 Scotland		15	0	0	0	0	164	17th
2016	Formula Ford 1600 Scotland		15	0	?	?	11	216	12th
2016	Formula Ford 1600 - Walter Hayes Trophy		1	0	0	0	0	0	27th
2016	Formula Ford Festival		1	0	0	0	0	0	NC
2016	Formula Ford 1600 National Championship - Post89		2	0	0	0	0	0	NC
2016	Super Series FF1600		2	0	0	0	0	0	NC
2017	Formula Ford 1600 Brands Hatch		2	1	1	2	2	N/A	1st
2017	Formula Ford Festival		1	0	0	0	0	0	19th
2017	Formula Ford 1600 Scotland	Graham Brunton Racing	13	2	?	?	5	221	2nd
2017	National Formula Ford 1600 Championship - Pro		8	0	0	0	0	76	18th
2017	Formula Ford 1600 Northern Championship - Post 89		1	0	0	0	0	4	30th
2018	Formula Ford Festival		1	0	0	0	0	0	NC
2018	Scottish Formula Ford 1600 Championship	Graham Brunton Racing	13	0	0	0	6	197	2nd
2018	National Formula Ford Championship - Pro		9	0	0	0	0	41	22nd
2019	VLN Series - Cup5 Class	Walkenhorst Motorsport	6	0	0	0	0	23.98	21st
2019	VLN Series - SP10 Class	Walkenhorst Motorsport	1	0	0	0	0	4.38	30th
2021	Ginetta GT4 Supercup - Pro	Team HARD.	17	0	0	1	0	133	14th
2023	Porsche Carrera Cup Great Britain - Pro-Am	Richardson Racing	4	0	0	0	0	2	12th
