= 2024 GT World Challenge Europe =

11th season of the GT World Challenge Europe

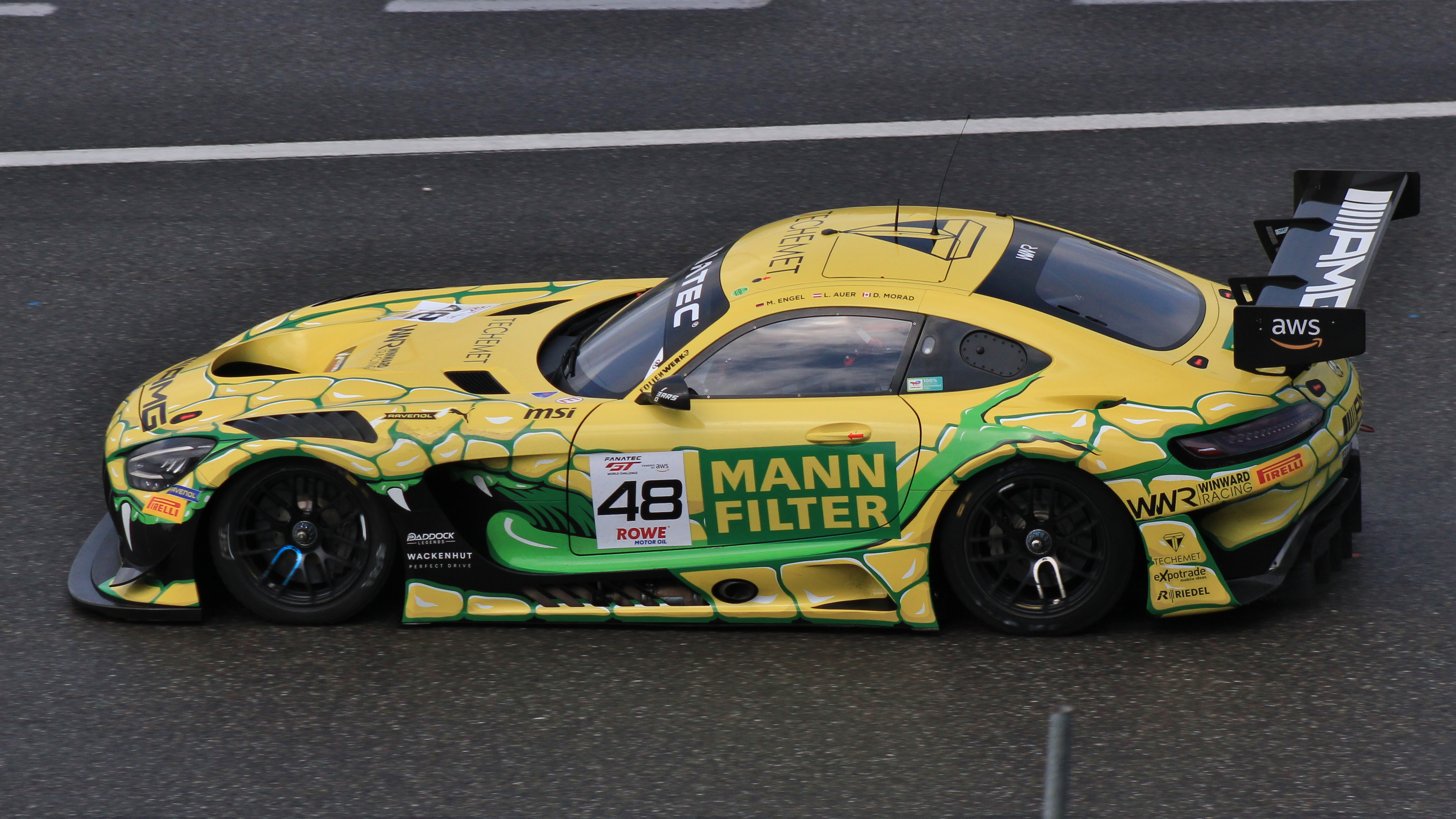
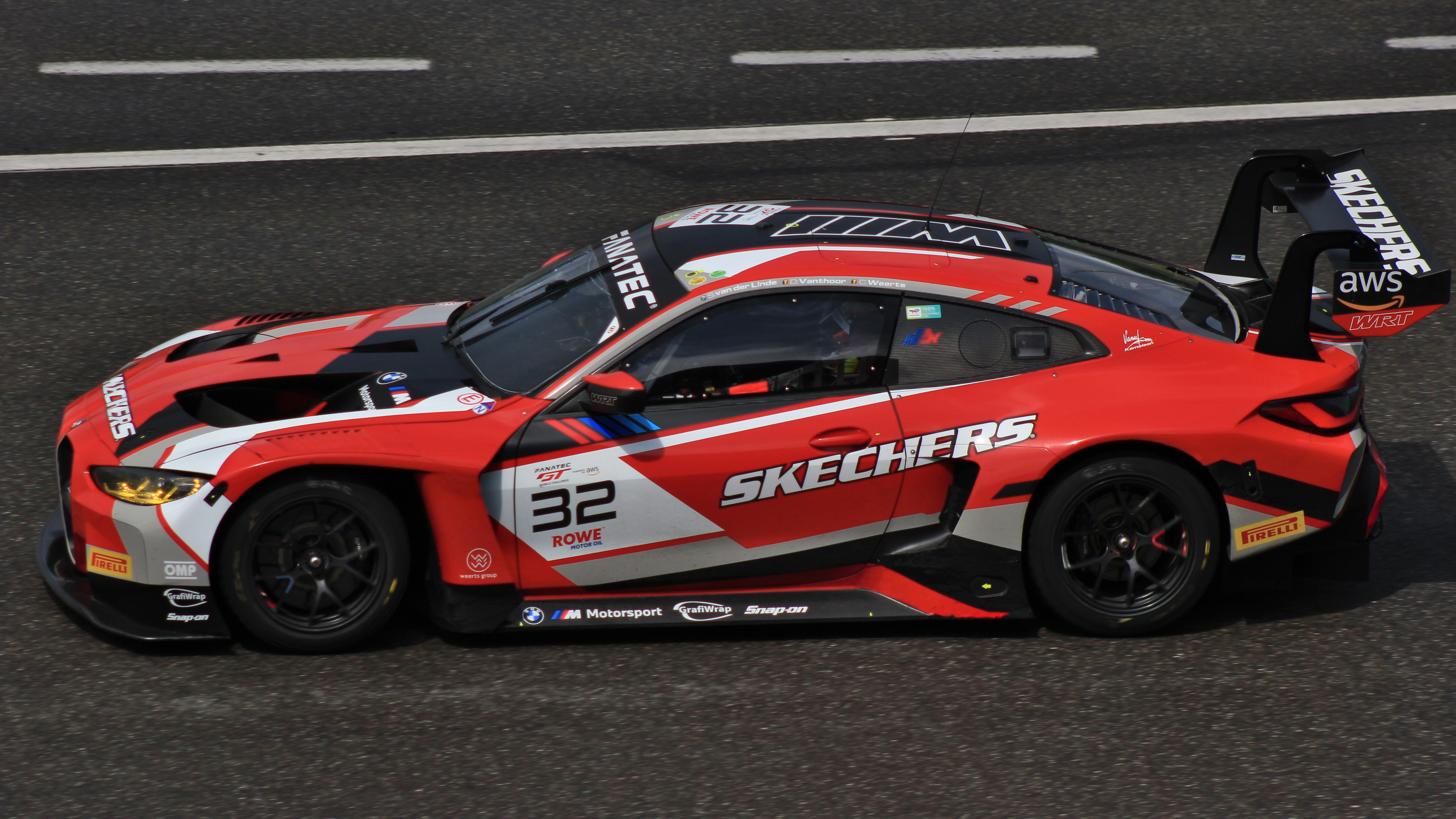
The No. 48 Winward Racing Mercedes-AMG of Lucas Auer and Maro Engel won the GT World Challenge Europe Drivers' Championship, while Team WRT won the GT World Challenge Europe Teams' Championship with their BMW.

The 2024 Fanatec GT World Challenge Europe Powered by AWS was a motor racing championship for GT3 cars and was the 11th running of GT World Challenge Europe. The season consisted of 10 events: 5 Sprint Cup events, and 5 Endurance Cup events. The championship was split into 5 classes: Pro, Gold, Silver, Bronze and Pro-Am, all with their own individual championships.

== Calendar ==
Round	Circuit	Date	Series
1	Circuit Paul Ricard, Le Castellet, France	5–7 April	Endurance
2	(United Kingdom) Brands Hatch, Kent	4–5 May	Sprint
3	(Italy) Misano World Circuit Marco Simoncelli, Misano Adriatico	17–19 May	Sprint
4	Circuit de Spa-Francorchamps, Stavelot, Belgium	26–30 June	Endurance
5	(Germany) Hockenheimring, Hockenheim	19–21 July	Sprint
6	Nürburgring, Nürburg, Germany	26–28 July	Endurance
7	Circuit de Nevers Magny-Cours, Magny-Cours, France	23–25 August	Sprint
8	Autodromo Nazionale Monza, Monza, Italy	20–22 September	Endurance
9	Circuit de Barcelona-Catalunya, Montmeló, Spain	11–13 October	Sprint
10	Jeddah Corniche Circuit, Jeddah, Saudi Arabia	28–30 November	Endurance

== Entries ==
=== Sprint Cup ===
Team	Car	No.	Drivers	Class	Rounds
(Germany) Liqui Moly Team Engstler by OneGroup	Audi R8 LMS Evo II 1–2, 4–5; Lamborghini Huracán GT3 Evo 2 3	6	(Germany) Luca Engstler	G	All
(Germany) Liqui Moly Team Engstler by OneGroup	Audi R8 LMS Evo II 1–2, 4–5; Lamborghini Huracán GT3 Evo 2 3	6	(Austria) Max Hofer	G	All
(Belgium) Comtoyou Racing	Aston Martin Vantage AMR GT3 Evo	7	(Belgium) Nicolas Baert	P	All
(Belgium) Comtoyou Racing	Aston Martin Vantage AMR GT3 Evo	7	(Italy) Mattia Drudi	P	All
(Belgium) Comtoyou Racing	Aston Martin Vantage AMR GT3 Evo	11	(United Kingdom) James Jakes	G	3–5 (Note: Petru Umbrărescu withdrew from round 5 after the Friday practice sessions due to health reasons. Jakes was allowed to compete solo for the remainder of the event.)
(Belgium) Comtoyou Racing	Aston Martin Vantage AMR GT3 Evo	11	(Romania) Petru Umbrărescu	G	3, 5
(Belgium) Comtoyou Racing	Aston Martin Vantage AMR GT3 Evo	11	(Denmark) Sebastian Øgaard	G	4
(Belgium) Comtoyou Racing	Aston Martin Vantage AMR GT3 Evo	12	(Netherlands) Dante Rappange	S	All
(Belgium) Comtoyou Racing	Aston Martin Vantage AMR GT3 Evo	12	(United Kingdom) Charles Clark	S	1
(Belgium) Comtoyou Racing	Aston Martin Vantage AMR GT3 Evo	12	(Belgium) Lorens Lecertua	S	2–5
(Belgium) Comtoyou Racing	Aston Martin Vantage AMR GT3 Evo	21	(Belgium) Matisse Lismont	G	All
(Belgium) Comtoyou Racing	Aston Martin Vantage AMR GT3 Evo	21	(United Kingdom) James Jakes	G	1–2
(Belgium) Comtoyou Racing	Aston Martin Vantage AMR GT3 Evo	21	(United Kingdom) David Pittard	G	3–5
(Belgium) Boutsen VDS	Mercedes-AMG GT3 Evo	9	(Germany) Maximilian Götz	P	All
(Belgium) Boutsen VDS	Mercedes-AMG GT3 Evo	9	(Andorra) Jules Gounon	P	All
(Belgium) Boutsen VDS	Mercedes-AMG GT3 Evo	10	(France) César Gazeau	S	All
(Belgium) Boutsen VDS	Mercedes-AMG GT3 Evo	10	(France) Aurélien Panis	S	All
(Switzerland) Emil Frey Racing	Ferrari 296 GT3	14	(United Kingdom) Ben Green	P	All
(Switzerland) Emil Frey Racing	Ferrari 296 GT3	14	(Finland) Konsta Lappalainen	P	All
(Switzerland) Emil Frey Racing	Ferrari 296 GT3	69	(Italy) Giacomo Altoè	P	All
(Switzerland) Emil Frey Racing	Ferrari 296 GT3	69	(Netherlands) Thierry Vermeulen	P	All
(Monaco) Eurodent GSM Team	Lamborghini Huracán GT3 Evo 2	18	(United Kingdom) James Kell	S	1 (Note: James Kell withdrew from round 1 shortly before the qualifying sessions due to health reasons. Påverud was allowed to compete solo for the remainder of the event.)
(Monaco) Eurodent GSM Team	Lamborghini Huracán GT3 Evo 2	18	(Norway) Marcus Påverud	S	1
(Monaco) Eurodent GSM Team	Lamborghini Huracán GT3 Evo 2	18	(Italy) Marco Butti	S	2
(Monaco) Eurodent GSM Team	Lamborghini Huracán GT3 Evo 2	18	(Italy) Pietro Delli Guanti	S	2
(France) Saintéloc Racing	Audi R8 LMS Evo II	25	(France) Paul Evrard	G	All
(France) Saintéloc Racing	Audi R8 LMS Evo II	25	(Belgium) Gilles Magnus	G	All
(France) Saintéloc Racing	Audi R8 LMS Evo II	26	(Ukraine) Ivan Klymenko	S	All
(France) Saintéloc Racing	Audi R8 LMS Evo II	26	(United Kingdom) Hugo Cook	S	1
(France) Saintéloc Racing	Audi R8 LMS Evo II	26	(Belgium) Gilles Stadsbader	S	2
(France) Saintéloc Racing	Audi R8 LMS Evo II	26	(Norway) Marcus Påverud	S	3–4
(France) Saintéloc Racing	Audi R8 LMS Evo II	26	(Argentina) Ezequiel Pérez Companc	S	5
(Belgium) Team WRT	BMW M4 GT3	30	(Australia) Calan Williams	S	All
(Belgium) Team WRT	BMW M4 GT3	30	(United Kingdom) Sam De Haan	S	1–4
(Belgium) Team WRT	BMW M4 GT3	30	(Indonesia) Sean Gelael	S	5
(Belgium) Team WRT	BMW M4 GT3	32	(Belgium) Dries Vanthoor	P	All
(Belgium) Team WRT	BMW M4 GT3	32	(Belgium) Charles Weerts	P	All
(Belgium) Team WRT	BMW M4 GT3	46	(Belgium) Maxime Martin	P	1–2
(Belgium) Team WRT	BMW M4 GT3	46	(Italy) Valentino Rossi	P	1–2
(France) Schumacher CLRT	Porsche 911 GT3 R (992)	44	(France) Stéphane Denoual	B	2–5
(France) Schumacher CLRT	Porsche 911 GT3 R (992)	44	(France) Steven Palette	B	2–5
(United States) Winward Racing Team Mann-Filter	Mercedes-AMG GT3 Evo	48	(Austria) Lucas Auer	P	All
(United States) Winward Racing Team Mann-Filter	Mercedes-AMG GT3 Evo	48	(Germany) Maro Engel	P	All
(United States) Winward Racing	Mercedes-AMG GT3 Evo	57	(Republic of Ireland) Reece Barr	S	1–3, 5
(United States) Winward Racing	Mercedes-AMG GT3 Evo	57	(Norway) Magnus Gustavsen	S	1–3
(United States) Winward Racing	Mercedes-AMG GT3 Evo	57	(Belgium) Gilles Stadsbader	S	5
Racing Team Turkey	Ferrari 296 GT3	51	(Republic of Ireland) Charlie Eastwood	G	1–3
Racing Team Turkey	Ferrari 296 GT3	51	(Turkey) Salih Yoluç	G	1–3
(Italy) AF Corse	Ferrari 296 GT3	52	(Singapore) Sean Hudspeth	S	All
(Italy) AF Corse	Ferrari 296 GT3	52	(Belgium) Jef Machiels	S	All
(Italy) AF Corse	Ferrari 296 GT3	71	(Italy) Eliseo Donno	S	All
(Italy) AF Corse	Ferrari 296 GT3	71	(United Kingdom) Tom Fleming	S	All
(United Kingdom) Sky – Tempesta Racing	Ferrari 296 GT3	93	(Italy) Eddie Cheever III	B	2–5
(United Kingdom) Sky – Tempesta Racing	Ferrari 296 GT3	93	(Hong Kong) Jonathan Hui	B	2–5
(Italy) Dinamic GT	Porsche 911 GT3 R (992)	54	(Germany) Marvin Dienst	B	2
(Italy) Dinamic GT	Porsche 911 GT3 R (992)	54	(Austria) Philipp Sager	B	2
(Germany) Tresor Attempto Racing	Audi R8 LMS Evo II	66	Andrey Mukovoz (Note: Mukovoz is Russian, but he competes as a neutral competitor as Russian national emblems were banned by the FIA following the Russian invasion of Ukraine. Gvazava, also a Russian, competes under a Kyrgyz licence for the same reason.)	B	2–5
(Germany) Tresor Attempto Racing	Audi R8 LMS Evo II	66	(Luxembourg) Dylan Pereira	B	2–5
(Germany) Tresor Attempto Racing	Audi R8 LMS Evo II	88	(Italy) Lorenzo Ferrari	P	1–2
(Germany) Tresor Attempto Racing	Audi R8 LMS Evo II	88	(Germany) Christopher Haase	P	1–2
(Germany) Tresor Attempto Racing	Audi R8 LMS Evo II	88	(Italy) Lorenzo Ferrari	G	3–5
(Germany) Tresor Attempto Racing	Audi R8 LMS Evo II	88	(Italy) Lorenzo Patrese	G	3–5
(Germany) Tresor Attempto Racing	Audi R8 LMS Evo II	99	(Germany) Alex Aka	P	All
(Germany) Tresor Attempto Racing	Audi R8 LMS Evo II	99	(Switzerland) Ricardo Feller	P	All
(United Kingdom) Barwell Motorsport	Lamborghini Huracán GT3 Evo 2	72	(Finland) Patrick Kujala	B	2–5
(United Kingdom) Barwell Motorsport	Lamborghini Huracán GT3 Evo 2	72	(Luxembourg) Gabriel Rindone	B	2–5
(United Kingdom) Barwell Motorsport	Lamborghini Huracán GT3 Evo 2	78	(United Kingdom) Rob Collard	B	2–5
(United Kingdom) Barwell Motorsport	Lamborghini Huracán GT3 Evo 2	78	(United Kingdom) Sandy Mitchell	B	2–5
(Austria) Eastalent Racing	Audi R8 LMS Evo II	84	(Germany) Christopher Haase	P	4
(Austria) Eastalent Racing	Audi R8 LMS Evo II	84	(Austria) Simon Reicher	P	4
(Austria) Eastalent Racing	Audi R8 LMS Evo II	84	(Poland) Karol Basz	S	5
(Austria) Eastalent Racing	Audi R8 LMS Evo II	84	(Austria) Simon Reicher	S	5
(Italy) Imperiale Racing	Lamborghini Huracán GT3 Evo 2	85	(Kyrgyzstan) Dmitry Gvazava (Note: Mukovoz is Russian, but he competes as a neutral competitor as Russian national emblems were banned by the FIA following the Russian invasion of Ukraine. Nesov and Petrov, also Russians, compete under a Kyrgyz and an Israeli licence respectively for the same reason.)	B	2–5
(Italy) Imperiale Racing	Lamborghini Huracán GT3 Evo 2	85	(Belgium) Ugo de Wilde	B	2–5
(Argentina) Madpanda Motorsport	Mercedes-AMG GT3 Evo	90	(Argentina) Ezequiel Pérez Companc	P	1–3
(Argentina) Madpanda Motorsport	Mercedes-AMG GT3 Evo	90	(United Kingdom) Alexander Sims	P	1
(Argentina) Madpanda Motorsport	Mercedes-AMG GT3 Evo	90	(United Kingdom) Phil Keen	P	2–3
(Argentina) Madpanda Motorsport	Mercedes-AMG GT3 Evo	90	(Argentina) Ezequiel Pérez Companc	S	4
(Argentina) Madpanda Motorsport	Mercedes-AMG GT3 Evo	90	(Germany) Tom Kalender	S	4
(Germany) Rutronik Racing	Porsche 911 GT3 R (992)	96	(Germany) Sven Müller	P	All
(Germany) Rutronik Racing	Porsche 911 GT3 R (992)	96	(Switzerland) Patric Niederhauser	P	All
(Germany) Rutronik Racing	Porsche 911 GT3 R (992)	97	(United States) Dustin Blattner	B	2–5
(Germany) Rutronik Racing	Porsche 911 GT3 R (992)	97	(Germany) Dennis Marschall	B	2–5
(France) CSA Racing	Audi R8 LMS Evo II	111	(France) Simon Gachet	G	All
(France) CSA Racing	Audi R8 LMS Evo II	111	(Switzerland) Lucas Légeret	G	All
(United Kingdom) Garage 59	McLaren 720S GT3 Evo	159	(United Kingdom) Tom Gamble	P	All
(United Kingdom) Garage 59	McLaren 720S GT3 Evo	159	(Germany) Benjamin Goethe	P	All
(United Kingdom) Garage 59	McLaren 720S GT3 Evo	188	(Monaco) Louis Prette	B	2–5
(United Kingdom) Garage 59	McLaren 720S GT3 Evo	188	(United Kingdom) James Cottingham	B	2
(United Kingdom) Garage 59	McLaren 720S GT3 Evo	188	(Portugal) Miguel Ramos	B	3–5
(United Kingdom) / Century Motorsport (Note: Car No. 991 entered as Century Motorsport at rounds 2–4, and as Paradine Competition at round 5.); (United Kingdom) / Paradine Competition	BMW M4 GT3	991	(United Kingdom) Dan Harper	B	2–5
(United Kingdom) / Century Motorsport; (United Kingdom) / Paradine Competition	BMW M4 GT3	991	(United Kingdom) Darren Leung	B	2–5

Icon	Class
P	Pro Cup
G	Gold Cup
S	Silver Cup
B	Bronze Cup

=== Endurance Cup ===
Team	Car	No.	Drivers	Class	Rounds
(Germany) Mercedes-AMG Team GetSpeed	Mercedes-AMG GT3 Evo	2	(Andorra) Jules Gounon	P	All
(Germany) Mercedes-AMG Team GetSpeed	Mercedes-AMG GT3 Evo	2	(Germany) Fabian Schiller	P	All
(Germany) Mercedes-AMG Team GetSpeed	Mercedes-AMG GT3 Evo	2	(Germany) Luca Stolz	P	All
(Germany) GetSpeed	Mercedes-AMG GT3 Evo	3	(United States) Anthony Bartone	S	All
(Germany) GetSpeed	Mercedes-AMG GT3 Evo	3	(United Kingdom) James Kell	S	All
(Germany) GetSpeed	Mercedes-AMG GT3 Evo	3	(Switzerland) Yannick Mettler	S	All
(Germany) GetSpeed	Mercedes-AMG GT3 Evo	3	(United Kingdom) Aaron Walker	S	2
(Oman) AlManar Racing by GetSpeed	Mercedes-AMG GT3 Evo	777	(Oman) Al Faisal Al Zubair	G	All
(Oman) AlManar Racing by GetSpeed	Mercedes-AMG GT3 Evo	777	(Austria) Dominik Baumann	G	All
(Oman) AlManar Racing by GetSpeed	Mercedes-AMG GT3 Evo	777	(Canada) Mikaël Grenier	G	1–3, 5
(Oman) AlManar Racing by GetSpeed	Mercedes-AMG GT3 Evo	777	(Switzerland) Philip Ellis	G	2
(Oman) AlManar Racing by GetSpeed	Mercedes-AMG GT3 Evo	777	(Australia) Broc Feeney	G	4
(United States) CrowdStrike by Riley	Mercedes-AMG GT3 Evo	4	(United States) Colin Braun	PA	2
(United States) CrowdStrike by Riley	Mercedes-AMG GT3 Evo	4	(Netherlands) Nicky Catsburg	PA	2
(United States) CrowdStrike by Riley	Mercedes-AMG GT3 Evo	4	(United Kingdom) Ian James	PA	2
(United States) CrowdStrike by Riley	Mercedes-AMG GT3 Evo	4	(United States) George Kurtz	PA	2
(United Kingdom) Optimum Motorsport	McLaren 720S GT3 Evo	5	(United Kingdom) Shaun Balfe	B	2
(United Kingdom) Optimum Motorsport	McLaren 720S GT3 Evo	5	(United Kingdom) Ben Barnicoat	B	2
(United Kingdom) Optimum Motorsport	McLaren 720S GT3 Evo	5	(United Kingdom) Sam Neary	B	2
(United Kingdom) Optimum Motorsport	McLaren 720S GT3 Evo	5	(Netherlands) Ruben del Sarte	B	2
(United Kingdom) Optimum Motorsport	McLaren 720S GT3 Evo	27	(United Kingdom) Rob Bell	B	1–2, 4
(United Kingdom) Optimum Motorsport	McLaren 720S GT3 Evo	27	(United Kingdom) Mark Radcliffe	B	1–2, 4
(United Kingdom) Optimum Motorsport	McLaren 720S GT3 Evo	27	(United Kingdom) Ollie Millroy	B	1–2
(United Kingdom) Optimum Motorsport	McLaren 720S GT3 Evo	27	(Spain) Fran Rueda	B	2, 4
(Belgium) Comtoyou Racing	Aston Martin Vantage AMR GT3 Evo	7	(Italy) Mattia Drudi	P	All
(Belgium) Comtoyou Racing	Aston Martin Vantage AMR GT3 Evo	7	(Denmark) Marco Sørensen	P	All
(Belgium) Comtoyou Racing	Aston Martin Vantage AMR GT3 Evo	7	(Denmark) Nicki Thiim	P	All
(Belgium) Comtoyou Racing	Aston Martin Vantage AMR GT3 Evo	11	(Belgium) John de Wilde	B	1–4
(Belgium) Comtoyou Racing	Aston Martin Vantage AMR GT3 Evo	11	(Belgium) Kobe Pauwels	B	1–3
(Belgium) Comtoyou Racing	Aston Martin Vantage AMR GT3 Evo	11	(Netherlands) Job van Uitert	B	1–3
(Belgium) Comtoyou Racing	Aston Martin Vantage AMR GT3 Evo	11	(Netherlands) Dante Rappange	B	2
(Belgium) Comtoyou Racing	Aston Martin Vantage AMR GT3 Evo	11	(United Kingdom) James Jakes	B	4
(Belgium) Comtoyou Racing	Aston Martin Vantage AMR GT3 Evo	11	(Netherlands) Niels Koolen	B	4
(Belgium) Comtoyou Racing	Aston Martin Vantage AMR GT3 Evo	12	(Belgium) Nicolas Baert	S	All
(Belgium) Comtoyou Racing	Aston Martin Vantage AMR GT3 Evo	12	(Denmark) Sebastian Øgaard	S	All
(Belgium) Comtoyou Racing	Aston Martin Vantage AMR GT3 Evo	12	(Belgium) Esteban Muth	S	1–3
(Belgium) Comtoyou Racing	Aston Martin Vantage AMR GT3 Evo	12	(France) Erwan Bastard	S	2
(Belgium) Comtoyou Racing	Aston Martin Vantage AMR GT3 Evo	12	(Belgium) Kobe Pauwels	S	4
(Belgium) Comtoyou Racing	Aston Martin Vantage AMR GT3 Evo	12	(Belgium) Matisse Lismont	S	5
(Belgium) Comtoyou Racing	Aston Martin Vantage AMR GT3 Evo	21	(United Kingdom) Charles Clark	S	1–3
(Belgium) Comtoyou Racing	Aston Martin Vantage AMR GT3 Evo	21	(Belgium) Sam Dejonghe	S	1–3
(Belgium) Comtoyou Racing	Aston Martin Vantage AMR GT3 Evo	21	(Belgium) Matisse Lismont	S	1–3
(Belgium) Comtoyou Racing	Aston Martin Vantage AMR GT3 Evo	21	(Netherlands) Xavier Maassen	S	2
(Belgium) Comtoyou Racing	Aston Martin Vantage AMR GT3 Evo	21	(Netherlands) Job van Uitert	G	4–5
(Belgium) Comtoyou Racing	Aston Martin Vantage AMR GT3 Evo	21	(United Kingdom) Charles Clark	G	4
(Belgium) Comtoyou Racing	Aston Martin Vantage AMR GT3 Evo	21	(Belgium) Matisse Lismont	G	4
(Belgium) Comtoyou Racing	Aston Martin Vantage AMR GT3 Evo	21	(United Kingdom) James Jakes	G	5
(Belgium) Comtoyou Racing	Aston Martin Vantage AMR GT3 Evo	21	(Netherlands) Niels Koolen	G	5
(Switzerland) Kessel Racing	Ferrari 296 GT3	8	(Italy) David Fumanelli	B	1–2, 4–5
(Switzerland) Kessel Racing	Ferrari 296 GT3	8	(Switzerland) Nicolò Rosi	B	1–2, 4–5
(Switzerland) Kessel Racing	Ferrari 296 GT3	8	(Italy) Niccolò Schirò	B	1–2, 4–5
(Switzerland) Kessel Racing	Ferrari 296 GT3	8	(Italy) Daniele Di Amato	B	2
(Switzerland) Kessel Racing	Ferrari 296 GT3	74	(United Kingdom) Ben Tuck	B	1–2, 4
(Switzerland) Kessel Racing	Ferrari 296 GT3	74	(United Kingdom) Matt Bell	B	1–2
(Switzerland) Kessel Racing	Ferrari 296 GT3	74	(United Kingdom) John Hartshorne	B	1–2
(Switzerland) Kessel Racing	Ferrari 296 GT3	74	(United States) Chandler Hull	B	2
(Switzerland) Kessel Racing	Ferrari 296 GT3	74	(Switzerland) Alex Fontana	B	4
(Switzerland) Kessel Racing	Ferrari 296 GT3	74	(United States) Ashish Patel	B	4
(Belgium) Boutsen VDS	Mercedes-AMG GT3 Evo	9	(France) Thomas Drouet	P	All
(Belgium) Boutsen VDS	Mercedes-AMG GT3 Evo	9	(Germany) Maximilian Götz	P	All
(Belgium) Boutsen VDS	Mercedes-AMG GT3 Evo	9	(United Kingdom) Adam Christodoulou	P	1
(Belgium) Boutsen VDS	Mercedes-AMG GT3 Evo	9	(Belgium) Ulysse de Pauw	P	2
(Belgium) Boutsen VDS	Mercedes-AMG GT3 Evo	9	(Switzerland) Philip Ellis	P	3
(Belgium) Boutsen VDS	Mercedes-AMG GT3 Evo	9	(Brazil) Sérgio Sette Câmara	P	4
(Belgium) Boutsen VDS	Mercedes-AMG GT3 Evo	9	(Estonia) Ralf Aron	P	5
(Belgium) Boutsen VDS	Mercedes-AMG GT3 Evo	10	(France) César Gazeau	S	All
(Belgium) Boutsen VDS	Mercedes-AMG GT3 Evo	10	(France) Aurélien Panis	S	All
(Belgium) Boutsen VDS	Mercedes-AMG GT3 Evo	10	(United States) Roee Meyuhas	S	1–4
(Belgium) Boutsen VDS	Mercedes-AMG GT3 Evo	10	(France) Sébastien Baud	S	2
(Belgium) Boutsen VDS	Mercedes-AMG GT3 Evo	10	(Belgium) Esteban Muth	S	5
(Germany) Lionspeed GP	Porsche 911 GT3 R (992)	13	(Denmark) Bastian Buus	B	1
(Germany) Lionspeed GP	Porsche 911 GT3 R (992)	13	(Germany) Patrick Kolb	B	1
(Germany) Lionspeed GP	Porsche 911 GT3 R (992)	13	(Germany) Florian Spengler	B	1
(Germany) Lionspeed GP	Porsche 911 GT3 R (992)	80	(Denmark) Bastian Buus	B	3–5
(Germany) Lionspeed GP	Porsche 911 GT3 R (992)	80	(Germany) Patrick Kolb	B	3–5
(Germany) Lionspeed GP	Porsche 911 GT3 R (992)	80	(Netherlands) Michael Verhagen	B	3–5
(Germany) Lionspeed x Herberth	Porsche 911 GT3 R (992)	80	(Hong Kong) Antares Au	B	2
(Germany) Lionspeed x Herberth	Porsche 911 GT3 R (992)	80	(Switzerland) Alexander Fach	B	2
(Germany) Lionspeed x Herberth	Porsche 911 GT3 R (992)	80	(Belgium) Alessio Picariello	B	2
(Germany) Lionspeed x Herberth	Porsche 911 GT3 R (992)	80	(Estonia) Martin Rump	B	2
(Germany) Herberth Motorsport	Porsche 911 GT3 R (992)	91	(Germany) Ralf Bohn	B	All
(Germany) Herberth Motorsport	Porsche 911 GT3 R (992)	91	(Germany) Robert Renauer	B	All
(Germany) Herberth Motorsport	Porsche 911 GT3 R (992)	91	(Netherlands) Morris Schuring	B	All
(Germany) Herberth Motorsport	Porsche 911 GT3 R (992)	91	(Germany) Alfred Renauer	B	2
(Germany) SSR Herberth	Porsche 911 GT3 R (992)	92	(Australia) Matt Campbell	P	2
(Germany) SSR Herberth	Porsche 911 GT3 R (992)	92	(France) Mathieu Jaminet	P	2
(Germany) SSR Herberth	Porsche 911 GT3 R (992)	92	(France) Frédéric Makowiecki	P	2
(Lithuania) Pure Rxcing	Porsche 911 GT3 R (992)	911	(Austria) Klaus Bachler	P	All
(Lithuania) Pure Rxcing	Porsche 911 GT3 R (992)	911	(United Kingdom) Alex Malykhin (Note: Malykhin is Belarusian, but he competes under a British licence as Belarusian national emblems were banned by the FIA following the Russian invasion of Ukraine.)	P	All
(Lithuania) Pure Rxcing	Porsche 911 GT3 R (992)	911	(Germany) Joel Sturm	P	All
(Italy) BMW Italia Ceccato Racing	BMW M4 GT3	15	(Italy) Marco Cassarà	B	4
(Italy) BMW Italia Ceccato Racing	BMW M4 GT3	15	(United States) Phillippe Denes	B	4
(Italy) BMW Italia Ceccato Racing	BMW M4 GT3	15	(Italy) Felice Jelmini	B	4
(China) Uno Racing Team with Landgraf	Mercedes-AMG GT3 Evo	16	(Netherlands) Indy Dontje	PA	2
(China) Uno Racing Team with Landgraf	Mercedes-AMG GT3 Evo	16	(Hong Kong) David Pun	PA	2
(China) Uno Racing Team with Landgraf	Mercedes-AMG GT3 Evo	16	(Hong Kong) "Rio"	PA	2
(China) Uno Racing Team with Landgraf	Mercedes-AMG GT3 Evo	16	(Macau) Kevin Tse	PA	2
(Austria) GRT Grasser Racing Team	Lamborghini Huracán GT3 Evo 2	19	(Italy) Mateo Llarena	S	All
(Austria) GRT Grasser Racing Team	Lamborghini Huracán GT3 Evo 2	19	(Kuwait) Haytham Qarajouli	S	1–3
(Austria) GRT Grasser Racing Team	Lamborghini Huracán GT3 Evo 2	19	(United Kingdom) Hugo Cook	S	1–2
(Austria) GRT Grasser Racing Team	Lamborghini Huracán GT3 Evo 2	19	(Belgium) Baptiste Moulin	S	2, 4
(Austria) GRT Grasser Racing Team	Lamborghini Huracán GT3 Evo 2	19	(France) Loris Cabirou	S	3, 5
(Austria) GRT Grasser Racing Team	Lamborghini Huracán GT3 Evo 2	19	(Israel) Artem Petrov	S	4
(Austria) GRT Grasser Racing Team	Lamborghini Huracán GT3 Evo 2	19	(Spain) Isaac Tutumlu	S	5
(Austria) GRT Grasser Racing Team	Lamborghini Huracán GT3 Evo 2	163	(Italy) Marco Mapelli	P	All
(Austria) GRT Grasser Racing Team	Lamborghini Huracán GT3 Evo 2	163	(France) Franck Perera	P	All
(Austria) GRT Grasser Racing Team	Lamborghini Huracán GT3 Evo 2	163	(Germany) Christian Engelhart	P	1
(Austria) GRT Grasser Racing Team	Lamborghini Huracán GT3 Evo 2	163	(South Africa) Jordan Pepper	P	2–5
(France) Schumacher CLRT	Porsche 911 GT3 R (992)	22	(France) Dorian Boccolacci	P	All
(France) Schumacher CLRT	Porsche 911 GT3 R (992)	22	(Turkey) Ayhancan Güven	P	All
(France) Schumacher CLRT	Porsche 911 GT3 R (992)	22	(Germany) Laurin Heinrich	P	1–3, 5
(France) Schumacher CLRT	Porsche 911 GT3 R (992)	22	(France) Kévin Estre	P	4
(China) Phantom Global Racing	Porsche 911 GT3 R (992)	23	(Sweden) Joel Eriksson	P	2
(China) Phantom Global Racing	Porsche 911 GT3 R (992)	23	(New Zealand) Jaxon Evans	P	2
(China) Phantom Global Racing	Porsche 911 GT3 R (992)	23	(Austria) Thomas Preining	P	2
(France) Saintéloc Racing	Audi R8 LMS Evo II	25	(France) Paul Evrard	G	All
(France) Saintéloc Racing	Audi R8 LMS Evo II	25	(Belgium) Gilles Magnus	G	All
(France) Saintéloc Racing	Audi R8 LMS Evo II	25	(France) Jim Pla	G	All
(France) Saintéloc Racing	Audi R8 LMS Evo II	25	(Belgium) Ugo de Wilde	G	2
(France) Saintéloc Racing	Audi R8 LMS Evo II	26	(Ukraine) Ivan Klymenko	S	1–2, 4
(France) Saintéloc Racing	Audi R8 LMS Evo II	26	(France) Alban Varutti	S	1–2, 4
(France) Saintéloc Racing	Audi R8 LMS Evo II	26	(Belgium) Ugo de Wilde	S	1
(France) Saintéloc Racing	Audi R8 LMS Evo II	26	(Norway) Marcus Påverud	S	2
(France) Saintéloc Racing	Audi R8 LMS Evo II	26	(Belgium) Gilles Stadsbader	S	2
(France) Saintéloc Racing	Audi R8 LMS Evo II	26	(Argentina) Ezequiel Pérez Companc	S	4–5
(France) Saintéloc Racing	Audi R8 LMS Evo II	26	(Switzerland) Lucas Légeret	S	5
(France) Saintéloc Racing	Audi R8 LMS Evo II	26	(Belgium) Kobe Pauwels	S	5
(France) Saintéloc Racing	Audi R8 LMS Evo II	26	(France) Michael Blanchemain	B	3
(France) Saintéloc Racing	Audi R8 LMS Evo II	26	(France) Alban Varutti	B	3
(France) Saintéloc Racing	Audi R8 LMS Evo II	26	(Belgium) Ugo de Wilde	B	3
(Antigua and Barbuda) HAAS RT	Audi R8 LMS Evo II	28	(France) Simon Gachet	P	2
(Antigua and Barbuda) HAAS RT	Audi R8 LMS Evo II	28	(Belgium) Jan Heylen	P	2
(Antigua and Barbuda) HAAS RT	Audi R8 LMS Evo II	28	(Denmark) Dennis Lind	P	2
(Antigua and Barbuda) HAAS RT	Audi R8 LMS Evo II	38	(Lithuania) Julius Adomavičius	PA	2
(Antigua and Barbuda) HAAS RT	Audi R8 LMS Evo II	38	(Belgium) Olivier Bertels	PA	2
(Antigua and Barbuda) HAAS RT	Audi R8 LMS Evo II	38	(Belgium) Armand Fumal	PA	2
(Antigua and Barbuda) HAAS RT	Audi R8 LMS Evo II	38	(Australia) Brad Schumacher	PA	2
OQ by Oman Racing	BMW M4 GT3	30	(Oman) Ahmad Al Harthy	B	All
OQ by Oman Racing	BMW M4 GT3	30	(United Kingdom) Sam De Haan	B	All
OQ by Oman Racing	BMW M4 GT3	30	(Germany) Jens Klingmann	B	All
OQ by Oman Racing	BMW M4 GT3	30	(Australia) Calan Williams	B	2
(Belgium) Team WRT	BMW M4 GT3	32	(South Africa) Sheldon van der Linde	P	All
(Belgium) Team WRT	BMW M4 GT3	32	(Belgium) Dries Vanthoor	P	All
(Belgium) Team WRT	BMW M4 GT3	32	(Belgium) Charles Weerts	P	All
(Belgium) Team WRT	BMW M4 GT3	46	(Switzerland) Raffaele Marciello	P	All
(Belgium) Team WRT	BMW M4 GT3	46	(Belgium) Maxime Martin	P	All
(Belgium) Team WRT	BMW M4 GT3	46	(Italy) Valentino Rossi	P	All
(Germany) Tresor Attempto Racing	Audi R8 LMS Evo II	33	(Italy) Andrea Cola	S	5
(Germany) Tresor Attempto Racing	Audi R8 LMS Evo II	33	(Italy) Pietro Delli Guanti	S	5
(Germany) Tresor Attempto Racing	Audi R8 LMS Evo II	33	(Italy) Rocco Mazzola	S	5
(Germany) Tresor Attempto Racing	Audi R8 LMS Evo II	66	(Austria) Max Hofer	B	All
(Germany) Tresor Attempto Racing	Audi R8 LMS Evo II	66	Andrey Mukovoz	B	All
(Germany) Tresor Attempto Racing	Audi R8 LMS Evo II	66	(Luxembourg) Dylan Pereira	B	1–3, 5
(Germany) Tresor Attempto Racing	Audi R8 LMS Evo II	66	(Kyrgyzstan) Alexey Nesov	B	2
(Germany) Tresor Attempto Racing	Audi R8 LMS Evo II	88	(Italy) Lorenzo Ferrari	G	All
(Germany) Tresor Attempto Racing	Audi R8 LMS Evo II	88	(Italy) Leonardo Moncini	G	All
(Germany) Tresor Attempto Racing	Audi R8 LMS Evo II	88	(Italy) Lorenzo Patrese	G	All
(Germany) Tresor Attempto Racing	Audi R8 LMS Evo II	88	(Netherlands) Glenn van Berlo	G	2
(Germany) Tresor Attempto Racing	Audi R8 LMS Evo II	99	(Germany) Alex Aka	P	All
(Germany) Tresor Attempto Racing	Audi R8 LMS Evo II	99	(Switzerland) Ricardo Feller	P	All
(Germany) Tresor Attempto Racing	Audi R8 LMS Evo II	99	(Germany) Christopher Haase	P	All
(Germany) Walkenhorst Racing	Aston Martin Vantage AMR GT3 Evo	34	(Portugal) Henrique Chaves	P	All
(Germany) Walkenhorst Racing	Aston Martin Vantage AMR GT3 Evo	34	(United Kingdom) David Pittard	P	All
(Germany) Walkenhorst Racing	Aston Martin Vantage AMR GT3 Evo	34	(United Kingdom) Ross Gunn	P	1–3, 5
(Germany) Walkenhorst Racing	Aston Martin Vantage AMR GT3 Evo	34	(France) Valentin Hasse-Clot	P	4
(Germany) Walkenhorst Racing	Aston Martin Vantage AMR GT3 Evo	35	(United Kingdom) Lorcan Hanafin	S	All
(Germany) Walkenhorst Racing	Aston Martin Vantage AMR GT3 Evo	35	(France) Romain Leroux	S	All
(Germany) Walkenhorst Racing	Aston Martin Vantage AMR GT3 Evo	35	(France) Maxime Robin	S	All
(Germany) Walkenhorst Racing	Aston Martin Vantage AMR GT3 Evo	36	(United Kingdom) Ben Green	B	All
(Germany) Walkenhorst Racing	Aston Martin Vantage AMR GT3 Evo	36	(Netherlands) Mex Jansen	B	All
(Germany) Walkenhorst Racing	Aston Martin Vantage AMR GT3 Evo	36	(United Kingdom) Tim Creswick	B	1–4
(Germany) Walkenhorst Racing	Aston Martin Vantage AMR GT3 Evo	36	(United States) Bijoy Garg	B	2
(Germany) Walkenhorst Racing	Aston Martin Vantage AMR GT3 Evo	36	(Hong Kong) David Pun	B	5
(United States) Mercedes-AMG Team Mann-Filter	Mercedes-AMG GT3 Evo	48	(Austria) Lucas Auer	P	All
(United States) Mercedes-AMG Team Mann-Filter	Mercedes-AMG GT3 Evo	48	(Germany) Maro Engel	P	All
(United States) Mercedes-AMG Team Mann-Filter	Mercedes-AMG GT3 Evo	48	(Canada) Daniel Morad	P	All
(United States) Winward Racing	Mercedes-AMG GT3 Evo	57	(Netherlands) "Daan Arrow"	S	1–4
(United States) Winward Racing	Mercedes-AMG GT3 Evo	57	(Netherlands) Colin Caresani	S	1–4
(United States) Winward Racing	Mercedes-AMG GT3 Evo	57	(Thailand) Tanart Sathienthirakul	S	1–4
(Italy) AF Corse - Francorchamps Motors	Ferrari 296 GT3	51	(Italy) Alessandro Pier Guidi	P	All
(Italy) AF Corse - Francorchamps Motors	Ferrari 296 GT3	51	(Italy) Alessio Rovera	P	All
(Italy) AF Corse - Francorchamps Motors	Ferrari 296 GT3	51	(Italy) Davide Rigon	P	1–3, 5
(Italy) AF Corse - Francorchamps Motors	Ferrari 296 GT3	51	(Monaco) Vincent Abril	P	4
(Italy) AF Corse - Francorchamps Motors	Ferrari 296 GT3	71	(France) Thomas Neubauer	P	All
(Italy) AF Corse - Francorchamps Motors	Ferrari 296 GT3	71	(Spain) David Vidales	P	All
(Italy) AF Corse - Francorchamps Motors	Ferrari 296 GT3	71	(Monaco) Vincent Abril	P	1–3, 5
(Italy) AF Corse - Francorchamps Motors	Ferrari 296 GT3	71	(China) Yifei Ye	P	4
(Italy) AF Corse	Ferrari 296 GT3	52	(Italy) Andrea Bertolini	B	All
(Italy) AF Corse	Ferrari 296 GT3	52	(Belgium) Jef Machiels	B	All
(Italy) AF Corse	Ferrari 296 GT3	52	(Belgium) Louis Machiels	B	All
(Italy) AF Corse	Ferrari 296 GT3	52	(Italy) Tommaso Mosca	B	2
(United Kingdom) Sky – Tempesta Racing	Ferrari 296 GT3	93	(Italy) Eddie Cheever III	B	All
(United Kingdom) Sky – Tempesta Racing	Ferrari 296 GT3	93	(United Kingdom) Chris Froggatt	B	All
(United Kingdom) Sky – Tempesta Racing	Ferrari 296 GT3	93	(Hong Kong) Jonathan Hui	B	All
(United Kingdom) Sky – Tempesta Racing	Ferrari 296 GT3	93	(France) Lilou Wadoux	B	2
(Italy) Dinamic GT	Porsche 911 GT3 R (992)	54	(Germany) Marvin Dienst	B	1–2
(Italy) Dinamic GT	Porsche 911 GT3 R (992)	54	(Portugal) Guilherme Oliveira	B	1–2
(Italy) Dinamic GT	Porsche 911 GT3 R (992)	54	(Austria) Philipp Sager	B	1–2
(Italy) Dinamic GT	Porsche 911 GT3 R (992)	54	(Austria) Christopher Zöchling	B	2
(Italy) Dinamic GT	Porsche 911 GT3 R (992)	55	(Netherlands) Jop Rappange	S	All
(Italy) Dinamic GT	Porsche 911 GT3 R (992)	55	(Norway) Marius Nakken	S	1–2
(Italy) Dinamic GT	Porsche 911 GT3 R (992)	55	(Austria) Christopher Zöchling	S	1
(Italy) Dinamic GT	Porsche 911 GT3 R (992)	55	(Finland) Axel Blom	S	2
(Italy) Dinamic GT	Porsche 911 GT3 R (992)	55	(France) Théo Nouet	S	2–5
(Italy) Dinamic GT	Porsche 911 GT3 R (992)	55	(Portugal) Guilherme Oliveira	S	3–4
(Italy) Dinamic GT	Porsche 911 GT3 R (992)	55	(Italy) Felice Jelmini	S	5
(Bahrain) 2 Seas Motorsport	Mercedes-AMG GT3 Evo	60	(Bahrain) Isa Al Khalifa	G	1–2
(Bahrain) 2 Seas Motorsport	Mercedes-AMG GT3 Evo	60	(Croatia) Martin Kodrić	G	1–2
(Bahrain) 2 Seas Motorsport	Mercedes-AMG GT3 Evo	60	(United Kingdom) Lewis Williamson	G	1–2
(Bahrain) 2 Seas Motorsport	Mercedes-AMG GT3 Evo	60	(United Kingdom) Frank Bird	G	2
(New Zealand) Earl Bamber Motorsport	Porsche 911 GT3 R (992)	61	(New Zealand) Earl Bamber	PA	2
(New Zealand) Earl Bamber Motorsport	Porsche 911 GT3 R (992)	61	(Malaysia) Adrian D'Silva	PA	2
(New Zealand) Earl Bamber Motorsport	Porsche 911 GT3 R (992)	61	(New Zealand) Brendon Leitch	PA	2
(New Zealand) Earl Bamber Motorsport	Porsche 911 GT3 R (992)	61	(China) Kerong Li	PA	2
(Italy) Iron Lynx	Lamborghini Huracán GT3 Evo 2	63	(Italy) Mirko Bortolotti	P	1–4
(Italy) Iron Lynx	Lamborghini Huracán GT3 Evo 2	63	(Italy) Matteo Cairoli	P	1–3, 5
(Italy) Iron Lynx	Lamborghini Huracán GT3 Evo 2	63	(Italy) Andrea Caldarelli	P	1–3, 5
(Italy) Iron Lynx	Lamborghini Huracán GT3 Evo 2	63	(Switzerland) Edoardo Mortara	P	4
(Italy) Iron Lynx	Lamborghini Huracán GT3 Evo 2	63	(Italy) Leonardo Pulcini	P	4
(Italy) Iron Lynx	Lamborghini Huracán GT3 Evo 2	63	(Italy) Loris Spinelli	P	5
(Germany) Proton Competition	Ford Mustang GT3	64	(Germany) Christopher Mies	P	All
(Germany) Proton Competition	Ford Mustang GT3	64	(Belgium) Frédéric Vervisch	P	All
(Germany) Proton Competition	Ford Mustang GT3	64	(Norway) Dennis Olsen	P	1–4
(Germany) Proton Competition	Ford Mustang GT3	64	(United Kingdom) Ben Barker	P	5
(United Kingdom) Barwell Motorsport	Lamborghini Huracán GT3 Evo 2	72	(Finland) Patrick Kujala	B	All
(United Kingdom) Barwell Motorsport	Lamborghini Huracán GT3 Evo 2	72	(Luxembourg) Gabriel Rindone	B	All
(United Kingdom) Barwell Motorsport	Lamborghini Huracán GT3 Evo 2	72	(United Kingdom) Casper Stevenson	B	All
(United Kingdom) Barwell Motorsport	Lamborghini Huracán GT3 Evo 2	72	(Italy) Mattia Michelotto	B	2
(United Kingdom) Barwell Motorsport	Lamborghini Huracán GT3 Evo 2	78	(United Kingdom) Till Bechtolsheimer	B	All
(United Kingdom) Barwell Motorsport	Lamborghini Huracán GT3 Evo 2	78	(United Kingdom) Sandy Mitchell	B	All
(United Kingdom) Barwell Motorsport	Lamborghini Huracán GT3 Evo 2	78	(France) Antoine Doquin	B	1–4
(United Kingdom) Barwell Motorsport	Lamborghini Huracán GT3 Evo 2	78	(United Kingdom) Ricky Collard	B	2, 5
(Germany) Haupt Racing Team	Mercedes-AMG GT3 Evo	77	(Italy) Michele Beretta	G	All
(Germany) Haupt Racing Team	Mercedes-AMG GT3 Evo	77	(India) Arjun Maini	G	All
(Germany) Haupt Racing Team	Mercedes-AMG GT3 Evo	77	(Germany) Jusuf Owega	G	All
(Austria) Eastalent Racing	Audi R8 LMS Evo II	84	(Poland) Karol Basz	P	3
(Austria) Eastalent Racing	Audi R8 LMS Evo II	84	(Spain) Albert Costa	P	3
(Austria) Eastalent Racing	Audi R8 LMS Evo II	84	(Austria) Simon Reicher	P	3
(Italy) Imperiale Racing	Lamborghini Huracán GT3 Evo 2	85	(United States) Phillippe Denes	G	5
(Italy) Imperiale Racing	Lamborghini Huracán GT3 Evo 2	85	(Italy) Alberto Di Folco	G	5
(Italy) Imperiale Racing	Lamborghini Huracán GT3 Evo 2	85	(Denmark) Dennis Lind	G	5
(Argentina) Madpanda Motorsport	Mercedes-AMG GT3 Evo	90	(Germany) Patrick Assenheimer	S	1–3
(Argentina) Madpanda Motorsport	Mercedes-AMG GT3 Evo	90	(Argentina) Ezequiel Pérez Companc	S	1–3
(Argentina) Madpanda Motorsport	Mercedes-AMG GT3 Evo	90	(Poland) Karol Basz	S	2
(Argentina) Madpanda Motorsport	Mercedes-AMG GT3 Evo	90	(Switzerland) Alain Valente	S	2
(Argentina) Madpanda Motorsport	Mercedes-AMG GT3 Evo	90	(Germany) Tom Kalender	S	3
(Germany) Rutronik Racing	Porsche 911 GT3 R (992)	96	(France) Julien Andlauer	P	All
(Germany) Rutronik Racing	Porsche 911 GT3 R (992)	96	(Germany) Sven Müller	P	All
(Germany) Rutronik Racing	Porsche 911 GT3 R (992)	96	(Switzerland) Patric Niederhauser	P	All
(Germany) Rutronik Racing	Porsche 911 GT3 R (992)	97	(United States) Dustin Blattner	B	All
(Germany) Rutronik Racing	Porsche 911 GT3 R (992)	97	(Germany) Dennis Marschall	B	All
(Germany) Rutronik Racing	Porsche 911 GT3 R (992)	97	(Netherlands) Loek Hartog	B	1–3, 5
(Germany) Rutronik Racing	Porsche 911 GT3 R (992)	97	(Canada) Zacharie Robichon	B	2
(Germany) Rutronik Racing	Porsche 911 GT3 R (992)	97	(Switzerland) Alexander Fach	B	4
(Germany) ROWE Racing	BMW M4 GT3	98	(Germany) Marco Wittmann	P	1–4
(Germany) ROWE Racing	BMW M4 GT3	98	(Austria) Philipp Eng	P	1–3
(Germany) ROWE Racing	BMW M4 GT3	98	(United Kingdom) Nick Yelloly	P	1–3
(Germany) ROWE Racing	BMW M4 GT3	98	(Netherlands) Robin Frijns	P	4
(Germany) ROWE Racing	BMW M4 GT3	98	(Netherlands) Maxime Oosten	P	4
(Germany) ROWE Racing	BMW M4 GT3	998	(Brazil) Augusto Farfus	P	All
(Germany) ROWE Racing	BMW M4 GT3	998	(United Kingdom) Dan Harper	P	All
(Germany) ROWE Racing	BMW M4 GT3	998	(Germany) Max Hesse	P	All
(United Kingdom) Team RJN	McLaren 720S GT3 Evo	100	(United Kingdom) Alex Buncombe	PA	2
(United Kingdom) Team RJN	McLaren 720S GT3 Evo	100	(United Kingdom) Chris Buncombe	PA	2
(United Kingdom) Team RJN	McLaren 720S GT3 Evo	100	(United Kingdom) Josh Caygill	PA	2
(United Kingdom) Team RJN	McLaren 720S GT3 Evo	100	(United Kingdom) Jann Mardenborough	PA	2
(France) CSA Racing	Audi R8 LMS Evo II	111	(France) Arthur Rougier	G	All
(France) CSA Racing	Audi R8 LMS Evo II	111	(France) Romain Carton	G	1–4
(France) CSA Racing	Audi R8 LMS Evo II	111	(France) Adam Eteki	G	1–2
(France) CSA Racing	Audi R8 LMS Evo II	111	(France) Steven Palette	G	2
(France) CSA Racing	Audi R8 LMS Evo II	111	(United Kingdom) Hugo Cook	G	3–5
(France) CSA Racing	Audi R8 LMS Evo II	111	(France) Simon Gachet	G	5
(Hong Kong) Mercedes-AMG Team GruppeM Racing	Mercedes-AMG GT3 Evo	130	(Estonia) Ralf Aron	P	2
(Hong Kong) Mercedes-AMG Team GruppeM Racing	Mercedes-AMG GT3 Evo	130	(Spain) Daniel Juncadella	P	2
(Hong Kong) Mercedes-AMG Team GruppeM Racing	Mercedes-AMG GT3 Evo	130	(Denmark) Frederik Vesti	P	2
(United Kingdom) Garage 59	McLaren 720S GT3 Evo	158	(Denmark) Nicolai Kjærgaard	B	All
(United Kingdom) Garage 59	McLaren 720S GT3 Evo	158	(United Kingdom) Mark Sansom	B	All
(United Kingdom) Garage 59	McLaren 720S GT3 Evo	158	(United Kingdom) Lewis Proctor	B	1
(United Kingdom) Garage 59	McLaren 720S GT3 Evo	158	(United Kingdom) Chris Salkeld	B	2–3
(United Kingdom) Garage 59	McLaren 720S GT3 Evo	158	(United Kingdom) James Baldwin	B	2, 4–5
(United Kingdom) Garage 59	McLaren 720S GT3 Evo	159	(United Kingdom) Tom Gamble	P	All
(United Kingdom) Garage 59	McLaren 720S GT3 Evo	159	(Germany) Benjamin Goethe	P	All
(United Kingdom) Garage 59	McLaren 720S GT3 Evo	159	(United Kingdom) Dean MacDonald	P	All
(United Kingdom) Garage 59	McLaren 720S GT3 Evo	188	(Monaco) Louis Prette	B	1–4
(United Kingdom) Garage 59	McLaren 720S GT3 Evo	188	(United Kingdom) Adam Smalley	B	1–4
(United Kingdom) Garage 59	McLaren 720S GT3 Evo	188	(United Kingdom) James Cottingham	B	1
(United Kingdom) Garage 59	McLaren 720S GT3 Evo	188	(Germany) Marvin Kirchhöfer	B	2
(United Kingdom) Garage 59	McLaren 720S GT3 Evo	188	(Portugal) Miguel Ramos	B	2–4
(United Kingdom) Garage 59	McLaren 720S GT3 Evo	188	(Germany) Marvin Kirchhöfer	P	5
(United Kingdom) Garage 59	McLaren 720S GT3 Evo	188	(Monaco) Louis Prette	P	5
(United Kingdom) Garage 59	McLaren 720S GT3 Evo	188	(United Kingdom) Adam Smalley	P	5
(Germany) / Rinaldi Racing (Note: Car No. 333 entered as Rinaldi Racing at rounds 1–2 and 4–5, and as Frikadelli Racing at round 3.); (Germany) / Frikadelli Racing	Ferrari 296 GT3	333	(Germany) Felipe Fernández Laser	B	All
(Germany) / Rinaldi Racing; (Germany) / Frikadelli Racing	Ferrari 296 GT3	333	(South Africa) David Perel	B	All
(Germany) / Rinaldi Racing; (Germany) / Frikadelli Racing	Ferrari 296 GT3	333	(Germany) Christian Hook	B	1–2, 4–5
(Germany) / Rinaldi Racing; (Germany) / Frikadelli Racing	Ferrari 296 GT3	333	(Italy) Fabrizio Crestani	B	2
(Germany) / Rinaldi Racing; (Germany) / Frikadelli Racing	Ferrari 296 GT3	333	(Germany) Klaus Abbelen	B	3
(Australia) Triple Eight JMR	Mercedes-AMG GT3 Evo	888	(Malaysia) Prince Jefri Ibrahim	PA	2
(Australia) Triple Eight JMR	Mercedes-AMG GT3 Evo	888	(Austria) Martin Konrad	PA	2
(Australia) Triple Eight JMR	Mercedes-AMG GT3 Evo	888	(Australia) Jordan Love	PA	2
(Australia) Triple Eight JMR	Mercedes-AMG GT3 Evo	888	(United Kingdom) Alexander Sims	PA	2
(United Kingdom) / Century Motorsport (Note: Car No. 991 entered as Century Motorsport at rounds 1–3, and as Paradine Competition at round 4.); (United Kingdom) / Paradine Competition	BMW M4 GT3	991	(United Kingdom) Darren Leung	B	All
(United Kingdom) / Century Motorsport; (United Kingdom) / Paradine Competition	BMW M4 GT3	991	(United Kingdom) Toby Sowery	B	All
(United Kingdom) / Century Motorsport; (United Kingdom) / Paradine Competition	BMW M4 GT3	991	(United Kingdom) Jake Dennis	B	1, 3–5
(United Kingdom) / Century Motorsport; (United Kingdom) / Paradine Competition	BMW M4 GT3	991	(United States) Connor De Phillippi	B	2
(United Kingdom) / Century Motorsport; (United Kingdom) / Paradine Competition	BMW M4 GT3	991	(Brazil) Pedro Ebrahim	B	2
(Taiwan) HubAuto Racing	Porsche 911 GT3 R (992)	992	(France) Kévin Estre	P	2
(Taiwan) HubAuto Racing	Porsche 911 GT3 R (992)	992	(France) Patrick Pilet	P	2
(Taiwan) HubAuto Racing	Porsche 911 GT3 R (992)	992	(Belgium) Laurens Vanthoor	P	2

Icon	Class
P	Pro Cup
G	Gold Cup
S	Silver Cup
B	Bronze Cup
PA	Pro-Am Cup

- Dinamic GT was scheduled to run a pair of Ford Mustang GT3s, but parted ways with the American brand prior to the start of the season. Christopher Mies, Dennis Olsen and Frédéric Vervisch were set to share a Pro-class entry, with Ben Barker, Philipp Sager and Christopher Zöchling in a Bronze Cup car.
- GMB Motorsport was scheduled to enter an Aston Martin Vantage AMR GT3 Evo in Silver Cup for Gustav Birch, Simon Birch and Kasper H. Jensen, but the team folded prior to the start of the season.

== Results and standings ==
=== Scoring system ===
Championship points are awarded for the first ten positions in each race. The pole-sitter also receives one point and entries are required to complete 75% of the winning car's race distance in order to be classified and earn points. Individual drivers are required to participate for a minimum of 25 minutes in order to earn championship points in any race. In the Teams Standings, only the best-placed car for each team is classified.

Sprint Cup points

Position	1st	2nd	3rd	4th	5th	6th	7th	8th	9th	10th	Pole
Points	16.5	12	9.5	7.5	6	4.5	3	2	1	0.5	1

Paul Ricard, Nürburgring & Monza points

Position	1st	2nd	3rd	4th	5th	6th	7th	8th	9th	10th	Pole
Points	25	18	15	12	10	8	6	4	2	1	1

Jeddah points

Position	1st	2nd	3rd	4th	5th	6th	7th	8th	9th	10th	Pole
Points	33	24	19	15	12	9	6	4	2	1	1

24 Hours of Spa points

Points are awarded after six hours, after twelve hours and at the finish.

Position	1st	2nd	3rd	4th	5th	6th	7th	8th	9th	10th	Pole
Points after 6hrs/12hrs	12	9	7	6	5	4	3	2	1	0	1
Points at the finish	25	18	15	12	10	8	6	4	2	1	1

=== Drivers' championships ===
Only drivers who scored at least one championship point are shown.

==== Overall Drivers' Championship ====
Pos.	Drivers	Team	LEC (France)	BRH (United Kingdom)		MIS (Italy)		SPA (Belgium)			HOC (Germany)		NÜR (Germany)	MAG (France)		MNZ (Italy)	BAR (Spain)		JED (Saudi Arabia)	Points
Pos.	Drivers	Team	LEC (France)	S1	S2	S1	S2	6hrs	12hrs	24hrs	S1	S2	NÜR (Germany)	S1	S2	MNZ (Italy)	S1	S2	JED (Saudi Arabia)	Points
1	(Austria) Lucas Auer (Germany) Maro Engel	(United States) Winward Racing	45	3	1^{P}	5	2	10	35	Ret	1	3	3	2	1	13	C	4	1	155
2	(Belgium) Dries Vanthoor (Belgium) Charles Weerts	(Belgium) Team WRT	Ret	1	7	2	1^{P}	15	16	3	2	2	44	1	2	2	C	7	4	152.5
3	(Germany) Alex Aka (Switzerland) Ricardo Feller	(Germany) Tresor Attempto Racing	6	4	4	Ret	26	3	1	12	Ret	Ret	4	12	6	4	C	8	6	81.5
4	(Italy) Mattia Drudi	(Belgium) Comtoyou Racing	7	Ret	14	10	33	1	7	1	17	6	6	15	DNS	24	C	2	10	72
5	(Italy) Alessio Rovera (Italy) Alessandro Pier Guidi	(Belgium) AF Corse - Francorchamps Motors	9					5	4	2			8			3^{P}			3^{P}	71
6	(South Africa) Jordan Pepper (France) Franck Perera (Italy) Marco Mapelli	(Austria) GRT - Grasser Racing Team	11					17	8	5^{P}			1			10			2	63
7	(Finland) Konsta Lappalainen (United Kingdom) Ben Green	(Switzerland) Emil Frey Racing		2^{P}	5	4	7				3	1		5^{P}	13		C	12		62.5
8	(Germany) Christopher Haase	(Germany) Tresor Attempto Racing	6					3	1	12			4			4			6	61.5
9	(Belgium) Maxime Martin (Italy) Valentino Rossi	(Belgium) Team WRT	4	15	25	1^{P}	3	28	10	24			18			5			5	61
10	(Germany) Maximilian Götz	(Belgium) Boutsen VDS	16	DNS	3	9	9	2	9	18	12	4	7	19	3^{P}	6	C	5	12	59.5

Key
Colour	Result
Gold	Race winner
Silver	2nd place
Bronze	3rd place
Green	Points finish
Blue	Non-points finish
Blue	Non-classified finish (NC)
Purple	Did not finish (Ret)
Black	Disqualified (DSQ)
Black	Excluded (EX)
White	Did not start (DNS)
White	Race cancelled (C)
White	Withdrew (WD)
Blank	Did not participate

^{P} – Pole

==== Gold Drivers' Championship ====
Pos.	Drivers	Team	LEC (France)	BRH (United Kingdom)		MIS (Italy)		SPA (Belgium)			HOC (Germany)		NÜR (Germany)	MAG (France)		MNZ (Italy)	BAR (Spain)		JED (Saudi Arabia)	Points
Pos.	Drivers	Team	LEC (France)	S1	S2	S1	S2	6hrs	12hrs	24hrs	S1	S2	NÜR (Germany)	S1	S2	MNZ (Italy)	S1	S2	JED (Saudi Arabia)	Points
1	(Belgium) Gilles Magnus (France) Paul Evrard	(France) Sainteloc Racing	1	3	1^{P}	1	2	3	1	4^{P}	2	4	1^{P}	4	3	2	C	3	1	241.5
2	(France) Jim Pla	(France) Sainteloc Racing	1					3	1	4^{P}			1^{P}			2			1	140
3	(Italy) Lorenzo Patrese (Italy) Lorenzo Ferrari	(Germany) Tresor Attempto Racing	5					5	4	4	3	1	5	1	1	Ret	C	1	Ret	118.5

==== Silver Drivers' Championship ====
Pos.	Drivers	Team	LEC (France)	BRH (United Kingdom)		MIS (Italy)		SPA (Belgium)			HOC (Germany)		NÜR (Germany)	MAG (France)		MNZ (Italy)	BAR (Spain)		JED (Saudi Arabia)	Points
Pos.	Drivers	Team	LEC (France)	S1	S2	S1	S2	6hrs	12hrs	24hrs	S1	S2	NÜR (Germany)	S1	S2	MNZ (Italy)	S1	S2	JED (Saudi Arabia)	Points
1	(France) César Gazeau (France) Aurélien Panis	(Belgium) Boutsen VDS	2	1	2	6	7	6	5	8	4	2	1	2	2	Ret	C	1	2	178
2	(Argentina) Ezequiel Pérez Companc	(Spain) Madpanda Motorsport	3					3	6	4			5	1	4	5	C	4	1	125.5
3	(Australia) Calan Williams	(Belgium) Team WRT		2	3	1	1				2	1		5	3		C	2		112.5

==== Bronze Drivers' Championship ====
Pos.	Drivers	Team	LEC (France)	BRH (United Kingdom)		MIS (Italy)		SPA (Belgium)			HOC (Germany)		NÜR (Germany)	MAG (France)		MNZ (Italy)	BAR (Spain)		JED (Saudi Arabia)	Points
Pos.	Drivers	Team	LEC (France)	S1	S2	S1	S2	6hrs	12hrs	24hrs	S1	S2	NÜR (Germany)	S1	S2	MNZ (Italy)	S1	S2	JED (Saudi Arabia)	Points
1	(Hong Kong) Jonathan Hui (Italy) Eddie Cheever	(United Kingdom) Sky Tempesta Racing	4			6	1^{P}	1	3	4	3	3	5	6	4	4	C	4	6	134.5
2	(Germany) Dennis Marschall (United States) Dustin Blattner	(Germany) Rutronik Racing	10			DNS	4	Ret	Ret	Ret	8	5	1^{P}	2	1	5^{P}	C	1^{P}	1^{P}	132.5
3	(United Kingdom) Darren Leung	(United Kingdom) Century Motorsport (United Kingdom) Paradine Competition	17			4	2	15	13	9	1	1	4	3^{P}	8	2	C	3	Ret	106.5
4	Andrey Mukovoz	(Germany) Tresor Attempto Racing	Ret			3	7	6	2	1	5	4	Ret	5	5	3	C	5	Ret	97
5	(United Kingdom) Sandy Mitchell	(United Kingdom) Barwell Motorsport	8			5	5	11	15	10	2	2	3	1^{P}	7	Ret	C	2	8	91.5
6	(Luxembourg) Dylan Pereira	(Germany) Tresor Attempto Racing	Ret			3	7	6	2	1	5	4	Ret	5	5		C	5	Ret	82
7	(United Kingdom) Dan Harper	(United Kingdom) Century Motorsport (United Kingdom) Paradine Competition				4	2				1	1		3^{P}	8		C	3		74.5
8	(United Kingdom) Chris Froggatt	(United Kingdom) Sky Tempesta Racing	4					1	3	4			5			4			6	74
9	(Italy) Andrea Bertolini (Belgium) Jef Machiels (Belgium) Louis Machiels	(Italy) AF Corse	2					2	1	2			11			Ret			4	72
10	(United Kingdom) Rob Collard	(United Kingdom) Barwell Motorsport				5	5				2	2		1^{P}	7		C	2		67.5
11	(Oman) Ahmad Al Harthy (United Kingdom) Sam De Haan (Germany) Jens Klingmann	OQ by Oman Racing	6					12	9	Ret			7			1			2	64
12	(Netherlands) Loek Hartog	(Germany) Rutronik Racing	10					20	20	Ret			1^{P}						1^{P}	61
13	(Austria) Max Hofer	(Germany) Tresor Attempto Racing	Ret					6	2	1			Ret			3			Ret	53
14	(Luxembourg) Gabriel Rindone (Finland) Patrick Kujala	(United Kingdom) Barwell Motorsport	14			8	8	8	4	3	6	6	10	7	6	11	C^{P}	Ret	7	51.5
15	(Belgium) Ugo de Wilde	(Italy) Imperiale Racing				2	3				4	8	9	4	9		C	7		44.5
16	(Kyrgyzstan) Dmitry Gvazava	(Italy) Imperiale Racing				2	3				4	8		4	9		C	7		42.5
17	(Italy) Tommaso Mosca	(Italy) AF Corse						2	1	2										39
18	(Italy) David Fumanelli (Switzerland) Nicoló Rosi (Italy) Niccolò Schirò	(Switzerland) Kessel Racing	1					9	5	13						6			Ret	39
19	(Kyrgyzstan) Alexey Nesov	(Germany) Tresor Attempto Racing						6	2	1										38
20	(Belgium) John de Wilde	(Belgium) Comtoyou Racing	3					3	8	5			Ret			8				38
21	(Monaco) Louis Prette	(United Kingdom) Garage 59	15^{P}			7	6	14	12	12^{P}	Ret^{P}	9^{P}	6	8	2^{P}	Ret	C	Ret		36.5
22	(Netherlands) Job van Uitert	(Belgium) Comtoyou Racing						3	8	5			Ret							34
23	(United Kingdom) Toby Sowery	(United Kingdom) Century Motorsport (United Kingdom) Paradine Competition						15	13	9			4			2			Ret	32
24	(France) Lilou Wadoux	(United Kingdom) Sky Tempesta Racing						1	3	4										31
25	(United Kingdom) Jake Dennis	(United Kingdom) Century Motorsport (United Kingdom) Paradine Competition	17										4			2			Ret	30
26	(United Kingdom) Casper Stevenson	(United Kingdom) Barwell Motorsport	14					8	4	3			10			11			7	30
27	(Portugal) Miguel Ramos	(United Kingdom) Garage 59						14	12	12^{P}	Ret^{P}	9^{P}	6	8	2^{P}	Ret	C	Ret		28
28	(United Kingdom) Till Bechtolsheimer	(United Kingdom) Barwell Motorsport	8					11	15	10			3			Ret			8	24
29	(Italy) Mattia Michelotto	(United Kingdom) Barwell Motorsport						8	4	3										23
30	(France) Stéphane Denoual (France) Steven Palette	(France) Schumacher CLRT				9	Ret				7	7		9	3		C	6		22
31	(Germany) Ralf Bohn (Germany) Robert Renauer (Netherlands) Morris Schuring	(Germany) Herberth Motorsport	7					7	17	Ret			DNS			Ret			5	21
32	(Germany) Patrick Kolb (Denmark) Bastian Buus	(Germany) Lionspeed GP	9										2			Ret			Ret	20
33	(France) Antoine Doquin	(United Kingdom) Barwell Motorsport	8					11	15	10			3			Ret				20
34	(Switzerland) Alexander Fach	(Germany) Rutronik Racing						10	6	7						5				20
35	(Netherlands) Dante Rappange	(Belgium) Comtoyou Racing						3	8	5										19
36	(United Kingdom) James Baldwin (United Kingdom) Mark Sansom	(United Kingdom) Garage 59						17	16	11						Ret			3	19
37	(Germany) Marvin Dienst (Austria) Philipp Sager	(Italy) Dinamic GT	12			1^{P}	9	19	19	Ret										18.5
38	(Netherlands) Michael Verhagen	(Germany) Lionspeed GP											2			Ret			Ret	18
39	(United Kingdom) Rob Bell (United Kingdom) Mark Racliffe (Spain) Fran Rueda	(United Kingdom) Optimum Motorsport						5	10	6						10				14
40	(United Kingdom) Ollie Millroy	(United Kingdom) Optimum Motorsport	Ret					5	10	6										13
41	(United Kingdom) Adam Smalley	(United Kingdom) Garage 59	15^{P}					14	10	12^{P}			6			Ret				11
42	(United Kingdom) Ben Tuck (United Kingdom) Matt Bell (United Kingdom) John Hartshorne	(Switzerland) Kessel Racing	5					16	14	14						Ret				10
43	(Hong Kong) Antares Au (Belgium) Alessio Picariello (Estonia) Martin Rump	(Germany) Lionspeed x Herberth						10	6	7										10
44	(Germany) Felipe Fernández Laser (South Africa) David Perel	(Germany) Rinaldi Racing (Germany) Frikadelli Racing	11					18	18	Ret			8			7			Ret	10
45	(United Kingdom) Ben Green (Netherlands) Mex Jansen (United Kingdom) Tim Creswick (United States) Bijoy Garg	(Germany) Walkenhorst Racing	13					4	7	Ret										9
46	(United Kingdom) James Cottingham	(United Kingdom) Garage 59	15^{P}			7	6													8.5
47	(Italy) Daniele Di Amato	(Switzerland) Kessel Racing						9	5	13										6
48	(Germany) Christian Hook	(Germany) Rinaldi Racing (Germany) Frikadelli Racing	11					18	18	Ret						7			Ret	6
49	(United Kingdom) Ricky Collard	(United Kingdom) Barwell Motorsport						11	15	10									8	5
50	(Germany) Klaus Abbelen	(Germany) Rinaldi Racing (Germany) Frikadelli Racing	8																	4
50	(United Kingdom) Shaun Balfe (United Kingdom) Ben Barnicoat (United Kingdom) Sam Neary (Netherlands) Ruben del Sarte	(United Kingdom) Optimum Motorsport						13	11	8										4
50	(United Kingdom) James Jakes (Netherlands) Niels Koolen	(Belgium) Comtoyou Racing														8				4
51	(Germany) Alfed Renauer	(Germany) Herberth Motorsport						7	17	Ret										3
52	(France) Michael Blanchemain (France) Alban Varutti	(France) Saintéloc Racing											9							2
52	(Italy) Marco Cassará (United States) Phillippe Denes (Italy) Felice Jelmini	(Italy) BMW Italia Ceccato Racing														9				2
52	(United States) Connor De Phillippi (Brazil) Pedro Ebrahim	(United Kingdom) Century Motorsport (United Kingdom) Paradine Competition						15	13	9										2
52	(Germany) Florian Spengler	(Germany) Lionspeed GP	9																	2
53	(Australia) Calan Williams	OQ by Oman Racing						12	9	Ret										1
54	(Germany) Marvin Kirchhöfer	(United Kingdom) Garage 59						14	12	12^{P}										1
Pos.	Drivers	Team	LEC (France)	S1	S2	S1	S2	6hrs	12hrs	24hrs	S1	S2	NÜR (Germany)	S1	S2	MON (Italy)	S1	S2	JED (Saudi Arabia)	Points
Pos.	Drivers	Team	LEC (France)	BRH (United Kingdom)		MIS (Italy)		SPA (Belgium)			HOC (Germany)		NÜR (Germany)	MAG (France)		MON (Italy)	BAR (Spain)		JED (Saudi Arabia)	Points

=== Teams' Championships ===
Only teams who scored at least one championship point are shown.

==== Overall Teams' Championship ====
Pos.	Team	LEC (France)	BRH (United Kingdom)		MIS (Italy)		SPA (Belgium)			HOC (Germany)		NÜR (Germany)	MAG (France)		MNZ (Italy)	BAR (Spain)		JED (Saudi Arabia)	Points
Pos.	Team	LEC (France)	S1	S2	S1	S2	6hrs	12hrs	24hrs	S1	S2	NÜR (Germany)	S1	S2	MNZ (Italy)	S1	S2	JED (Saudi Arabia)	Points
1	(Belgium) Team WRT	4	1	7	1^{P}	1^{P}	9	8	3	2	2	18	1	2	1	C	7	4	181.5
2	(United States) Winward Racing	19	3	1^{P}	3	2	7	19	28	1	3	3	2	1	6	C	4	1	167.5
3	(Germany) Tresor Attempto Racing	6	4	4	10	10	3	1	9	9	6	4	5	4	3	C	8	5	106
4	(Belgium) AF Corse – Francorchamps Motors	9	9	10	18	18	5	2	2	4^{P}	21	8	17	7	2^{P}	C	19	3^{P}	90
5	(Switzerland) Emil Frey Racing		2^{P}	2	2	3				3	1		4^{P}	8		C	6		87.5
6	(Belgium) Comtoyou Racing	7	20	14	7	19	1	5	1	17	5	6	15	10	15	C	2	9	79.5
7	(Belgium) Boutsen VDS	16	6	3	6	7	2	7	18	10	4	7	9	3^{P}	4	C	5	12	77
8	(Austria) GRT – Grasser Racing Team	11					17	6	5^{P}			1			8			2	68
9	(Germany) Rutronik Racing	5	14	7	4	4	38	25	8	6	14	22^{P}	3	16	10	C	1^{P}	17	65.5
10	(United Kingdom) Garage 59	38	5	5	5	5	35	29	10	7	7	14	8	5	14	C	3	8	52.5
11	(Germany) Rowe Racing	1					7	17	6			5			27			Ret	47
12	(Italy) Iron Lynx	2^{P}					57	57	Ret			9			18			7	30
13	(Germany) GetSpeed Performance	3					24	5	25			12			35			8	29
14	(Lithuania) Pure Rxcing	8					11	6	Ret			20			8			14	20
15	(France) Schumacher CLRT	14					58	58	Ret			2			Ret			Ret	18
16	(France) CSA Racing	18	9	13	32	11	51	54	Ret	13	9	21	7	7	33	C	28	Ret	15
17	(Germany) Walkenhorst Motorsport	33					16	15	4			13			19			11	13
18	(Germany) LIQUI MOLY Team Engstler by One Group		7	10	21	15				6	13^{P}		13	19		C	10		13
19	(United Kingdom) Paradine Competition														7	C	22	Ret	10.5
20	(Spain) Madpanda Motorsport	22	19	17	11	8	19	43	31	Ret	10	32	8	18					10.5
21	(United Kingdom) Sky Tempesta Racing	25			20	17	4	12	16	20	18	33	28	22	12	C	23	28	9
22	(France) Saintéloc Racing	13	13	9	13	13	37	21	15	10	17	15	14	11	26	C	13	13	6.5
23	(Oman) AlManar Racing by GetSpeed	15					30	23	7			17			Ret			20	6
24	(Germany) Proton Competition	10					40	13	19			24			20			Ret	1
25	(United Kingdom) Barwell Motorsport	29			19	24	34	18	14	19	16	29	18	24	37	C^{P}	21	29	1
Pos.	Drivers	LEC (France)	S1	S2	S1	S2	6hrs	12hrs	24hrs	S1	S2	NÜR (Germany)	S1	S2	MON (Italy)	S1	S2	JED (Saudi Arabia)	Points
Pos.	Drivers	LEC (France)	BRH (United Kingdom)		MIS (Italy)		SPA (Belgium)			HOC (Germany)		NÜR (Germany)	MAG (France)		MON (Italy)	BAR (Spain)		JED (Saudi Arabia)	Points

Key
Colour	Result
Gold	Race winner
Silver	2nd place
Bronze	3rd place
Green	Points finish
Blue	Non-points finish
Blue	Non-classified finish (NC)
Purple	Did not finish (Ret)
Black	Disqualified (DSQ)
Black	Excluded (EX)
White	Did not start (DNS)
White	Race cancelled (C)
White	Withdrew (WD)
Blank	Did not participate

^{P} – Pole

==== Gold Teams' Championship ====
Pos.	Team	LEC (France)	BRH (United Kingdom)		MIS (Italy)		SPA (Belgium)			HOC (Germany)		NÜR (Germany)	MAG (France)		MNZ (Italy)	BAR (Spain)		JED (Saudi Arabia)	Points
Pos.	Team	LEC (France)	S1	S2	S1	S2	6hrs	12hrs	24hrs	S1	S2	NÜR (Germany)	S1	S2	MNZ (Italy)	S1	S2	JED (Saudi Arabia)	Points
1	(France) Saintéloc Racing	1	3	1^{P}	1	2	3	1	2^{P}	2	4	1^{P}	4	3	2	C	3	1	241.5
2	(France) CSA Racing	3	2^{P}	3	5^{P}	1^{P}	6	6	Ret	4	2	4	2	2	4	C	5^{P}	Ret^{P}	145.5
3	(Germany) Tresor Attempto Racing	5					5	4	4	3	1	5	1	1	Ret	C	1	Ret	118.5
4	(Germany) LIQUI MOLY Team Engstler by One Group		1	2	2	3				1^{P}	3^{P}		3^{P}	5^{P}		C	2		107.5
5	(Oman) AlManar Racing by GetSpeed	2^{P}					2	2	1			2			Ret			2	104
6	(Germany) Haupt Racing Team	6					4	3	3			3			1			3	95
7	(Belgium) Comtoyou Racing		5	5	4	5				5	5		5	4	3^{P}	C^{P}	4	4	90.5
8	(United Kingdom) 2 Seas Motorsport	4					1	5	5										39
9	(Belgium) AF Corse – Francorchamps Motors		4	4	3	4													32
Pos.	Drivers	LEC (France)	S1	S2	S1	S2	6hrs	12hrs	24hrs	S1	S2	NÜR (Germany)	S1	S2	MON (Italy)	S1	S2	JED (Saudi Arabia)	Points
Pos.	Drivers	LEC (France)	BRH (United Kingdom)		MIS (Italy)		SPA (Belgium)			HOC (Germany)		NÜR (Germany)	MAG (France)		MON (Italy)	BAR (Spain)		JED (Saudi Arabia)	Points

==== Silver Teams' Championship ====
Pos.	Team	LEC (France)	BRH (United Kingdom)		MIS (Italy)		SPA (Belgium)			HOC (Germany)		NÜR (Germany)	MAG (France)		MNZ (Italy)	BAR (Spain)		JED (Saudi Arabia)	Points
Pos.	Team	LEC (France)	S1	S2	S1	S2	6hrs	12hrs	24hrs	S1	S2	NÜR (Germany)	S1	S2	MNZ (Italy)	S1	S2	JED (Saudi Arabia)	Points
1	(Belgium) Boutsen VDS	2	1	2	6	7	6	5	8	4	2	1^{P}	2	2	Ret	C^{P}	1	2	178
2	(United States) Winward Racing	1	5	4	3	5	2	2	3^{P}	5	4	2			1	C			144.5
3	(Belgium) Comtoyou Racing	6	6	5	5	4	1	7	5	6	6	6	6	DNS	2	C	5	3	121.5
4	(France) Saintéloc Racing	9	4	6	7	2^{P}	9	9	6	3	5		3	Ret^{P}	5	C	4	1^{P}	117.5
5	(Belgium) Team WRT		2^{P}	3	1^{P}	1				2	1		5	3		C	2		112.5
6	(Belgium) AF Corse – Francorchamps Motors		3	1^{P}	2	3				1^{P}	3^{P}		4	1		C	6		105
7	(Italy) Dinamic GT	7					4	3	2			3			4			4	79
8	(Germany) GetSpeed	5					7	1	1			7			6			5	76
9	(Spain) Madpanda Motorsport	3^{P}					3	6	4			5	1^{P}	4					74
10	(Germany) Walkenhorst Motorsport	4					5	4	9			Ret			3			6	49
11	(Austria) GRT – Grasser Racing Team	8					8	8	7			4			Ret^{P}			Ret	27
12	(Monaco) Eurodent GSM Team		7	7	4	6													18
13	(Austria) Eastalent Racing															C	3^{P}		10.5
Pos.	Drivers	LEC (France)	S1	S2	S1	S2	6hrs	12hrs	24hrs	S1	S2	NÜR (Germany)	S1	S2	MON (Italy)	S1	S2	JED (Saudi Arabia)	Points
Pos.	Drivers	LEC (France)	BRH (United Kingdom)		MIS (Italy)		SPA (Belgium)			HOC (Germany)		NÜR (Germany)	MAG (France)		MON (Italy)	BAR (Spain)		JED (Saudi Arabia)	Points

== See also ==
- 2024 British GT Championship
- 2024 GT2 European Series
- 2024 GT4 European Series
- 2024 GT World Challenge Europe Endurance Cup
- 2024 GT World Challenge Europe Sprint Cup
- 2024 GT World Challenge Asia
- 2024 GT World Challenge America
- 2024 GT World Challenge Australia
- 2024 Intercontinental GT Challenge
