= James Kellett =

British racing driver (born 1998)

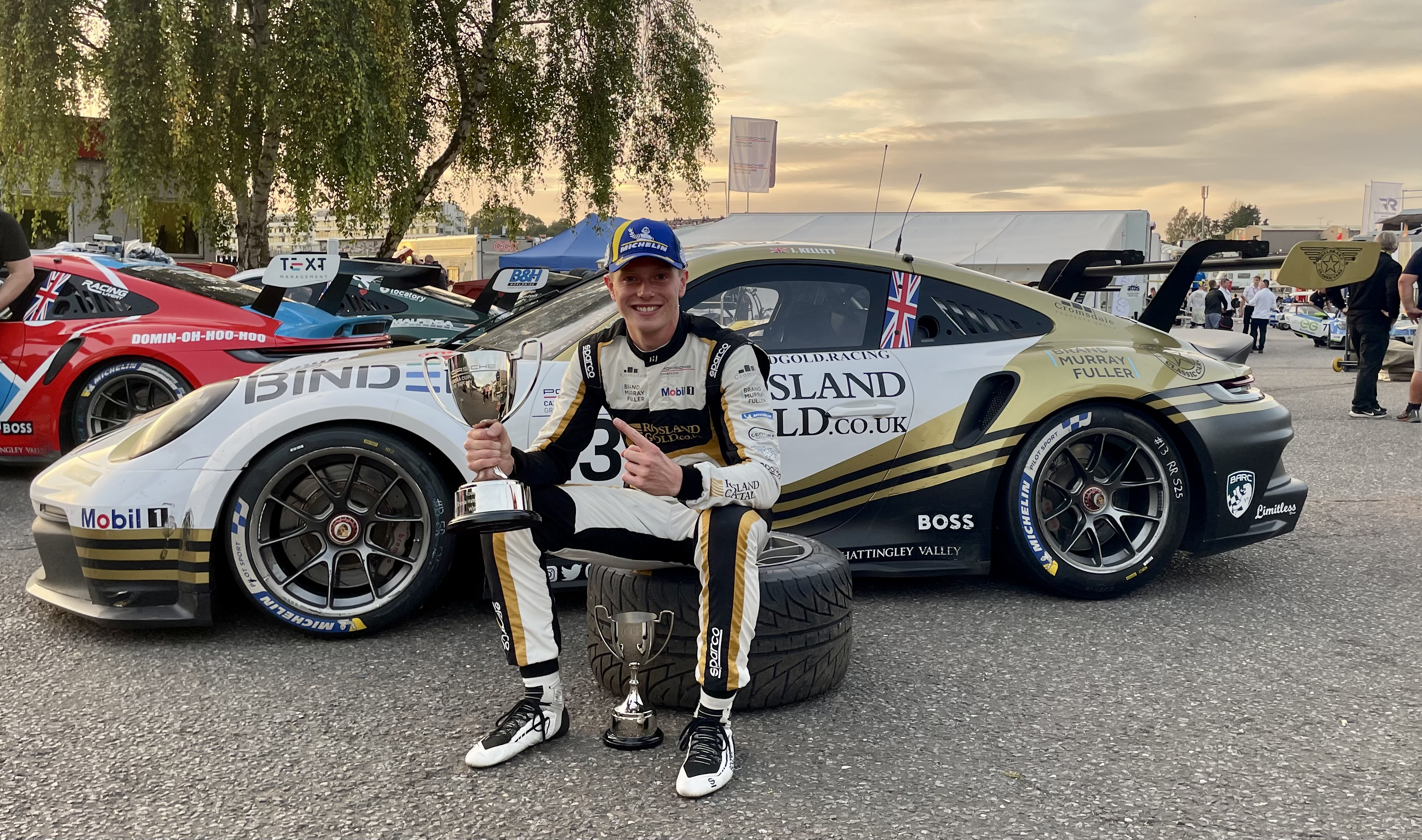
- Kellett in 2023
- Nationality: (United Kingdom) British
- Born: 27 February 1998 (age 28) Leeds, England
- Categorisation: FIA Silver

Championship titles
- 2022 2015, 2018 2013: Ginetta GT4 Supercup – G56 Pro; Ginetta GT5 Challenge; Ginetta Junior Winter Series

James Kellett (born 27 February 1998) is a British racing driver who last competed in the GT World Challenge Europe Endurance Cup, driving a BMW M4 GT3 Evo for Paradine Competition. He is a four-time Ginetta one-make champion.

== Career ==
Kellett made his car racing debut in the 2012 Ginetta Junior Winter Series for HHC Motorsport. Continuing with the team for the following year's Ginetta Junior Championship, Kellett scored his maiden career win at Rockingham as well as two other podiums to end the year sixth overall. At the end of the year, Kellett returned to the Ginetta Junior Winter Series, winning all four races to secure his first title in car racing. Continuing with HHC for his second full-time season in Ginetta Junior competition in 2014, Kellett took five wins and six other podiums en route to runner-up honours in the overall standings, notably beating Lando Norris.

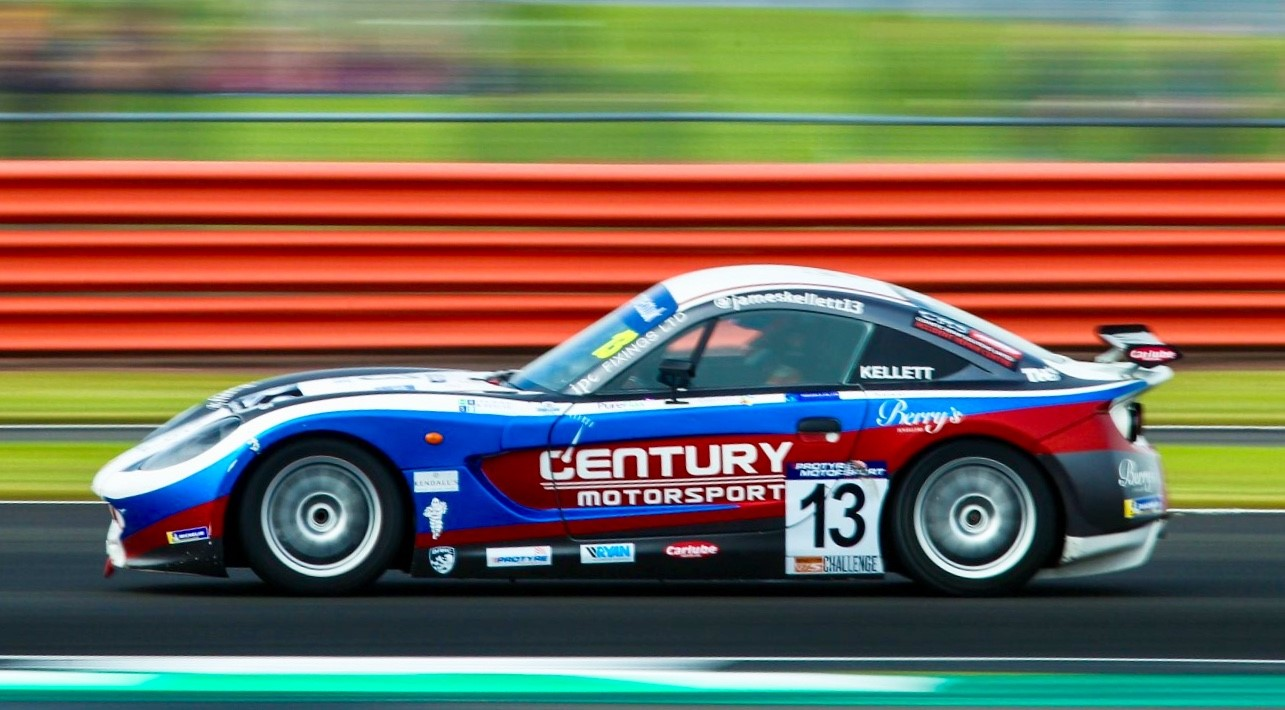
Kellett heading for victory in the Ginetta GT5 Challenge in 2018.

Kellett then switched to the TCR team as he stepped up to the Ginetta GT5 Challenge in 2015, scoring ten wins and eight more podiums to clinch the title in his rookie year. Kellett then spent the following two seasons on the sidelines on financial grounds, before returning to the Ginetta GT5 Challenge in 2018 with Century Motorsport, winning five of the 14 races he started and missing the podium only once to clinch his second series title.

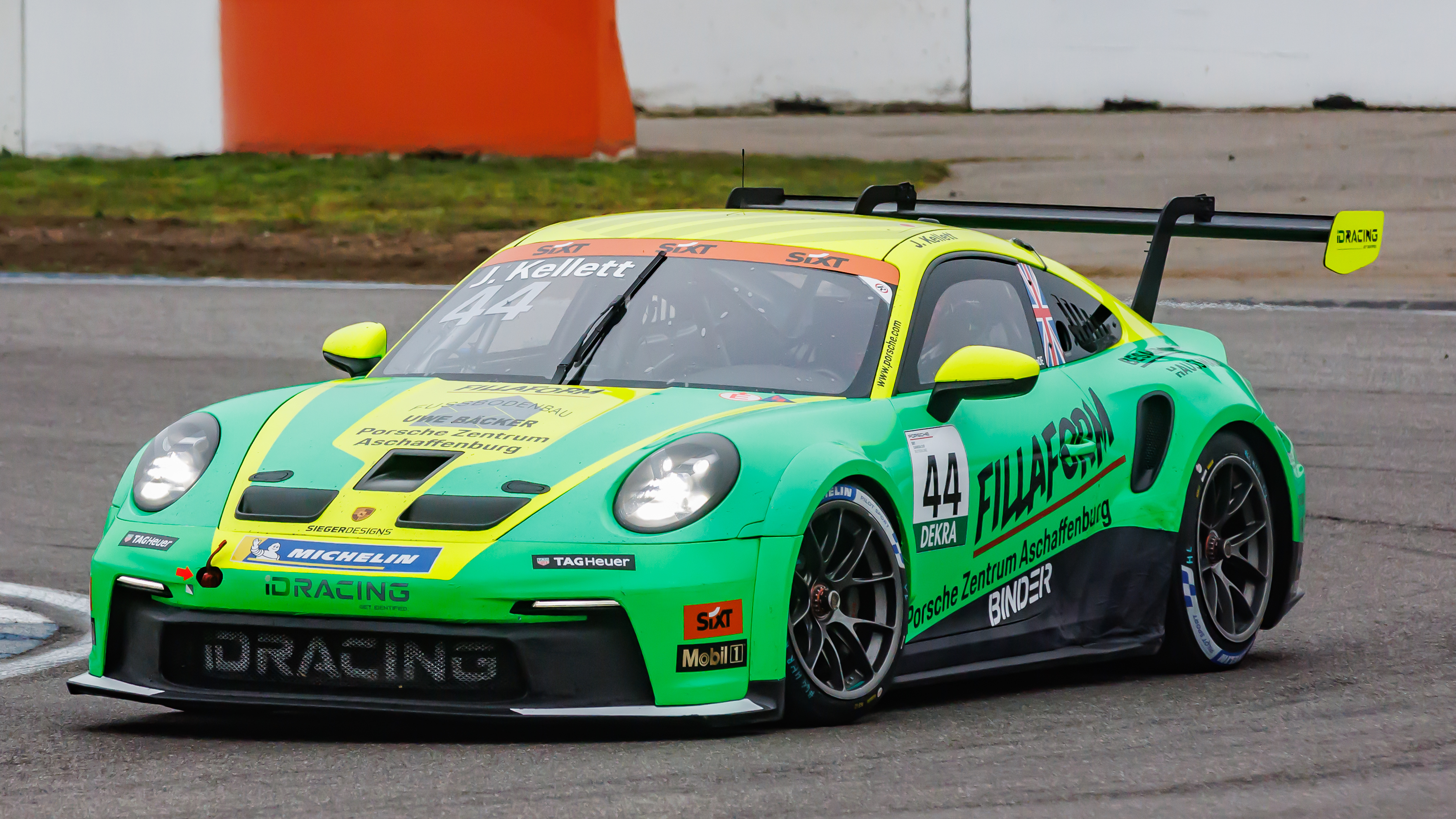
Kellett driving at the Hockenheimring in Porsche Carrera Cup Germany in 2024.

After yet another year on the sidelines, Kellett competed in the GTA class of the GT Cup Championship in 2020, finishing third in points in a season mainly contested with Century Motorsport. In 2021, Kellett returned to Century for another season in the GT Cup Championship, once again taking third in the GTA standings. Remaining with Century for 2022, Kellett switched to the Ginetta GT4 Supercup, winning 12 of the 19 races he started to secure the title in the series' last-ever season. Moving to Porsche Carrera Cup Great Britain the following year, Kellett won five times and took three other podiums to end the season runner-up to Adam Smalley in points. In 2024, Kellett turned to ID Racing and Porsche Carrera Cup Germany, taking a best result of fourth in the season-ending Hockenheimring to take 12th in the overall points.

In 2025, Kellett made his debut in GT3 competition, joining Paradine Competition to compete in the GT World Challenge Europe Endurance Cup. Racing a BMW M4 GT3 Evo in the Silver Cup for his rookie season, Kellett took a class win on debut at Le Castellet, helping him end the year fourth in the class standings. At the beginning of 2026, Kellett drove both of Paradine's cars at the Dubai 24 Hour, and was on course for a shock overall podium in his GT3 Am car until a brake disc failure in the closing stages took him out of contention. For the rest of the season, Kellett remained with the team for his second go at the GTWCE Endurance Cup, alongside team owner Darren Leung and a rotating cast of pro drivers in the Bronze Cup. In his second full season in the series, Kellett took class podiums at Le Castellet and the 24 Hours of Spa to clinch runner-up honours in points.

== Karting record ==
=== Karting career summary ===
Season	Series	Team	Position
2009	Formula Kart Stars — Cadet		23rd
2009	Kartmasters British GP — Cadet		12th
2010	Super One Series — Comer Cadet		29th
2010	Kartmasters British GP — Comer Cadet		5th
2010	WSK Nations Cup — 60 Mini	Prima Racing	34th
2011	WSK Master Series — KF3	Prima Racing	
2011	Super One Series — KF3		13th
2011	Trent Valley Kart Club — KF3		4th
2011	Copa de Campeones — KF3		7th
2011	Kartmasters British GP — KF3		9th
2012	Super One Series — KF3		15th
2012	Karting European Championship — KF3	Piers Sexton Racing	71st
2012	Kartmasters British GP — KF3		1st

== Racing record ==
=== Racing career summary ===
Season	Series	Team	Races	Wins	Poles	F/Laps	Podiums	Points	Position
2012	Ginetta Junior Winter Series	HHC Motorsport	3	0	0	0	0	33	10th
2013	Ginetta Junior Championship	HHC Motorsport	21	1	1	1	3	365	6th
2013	Ginetta Junior Winter Series	HHC Motorsport	4	4	2	3	4		**1st**
2014	Ginetta Junior Championship	HHC Motorsport	20	5	3	6	11	456	**2nd**
2015	Ginetta GT5 Challenge	TCR	21	10	6	5	18	605	**1st**
2018	Ginetta GT5 Challenge	Century Motorsport	14	5	1	6	13	492	**1st**
2020	GT Cup Championship – GTA	SmarTrack Series Elite	3	0	0	0	0	260.5‡	**3rd‡**
2020	GT Cup Championship – GTA	Century Motorsport	15	3	0	5	11	260.5‡	**3rd‡**
2021	GT Cup Championship – GTA	Century Motorsport							**3rd‡**
2021	Ginetta GT4 Supercup	Century Motorsport	6	3	2	5	4	0	NC†
2022	GT Cup Championship – GTC	Century Motorsport							
2022	Ginetta GT4 Supercup – G56 Pro	Rosland Gold Racing by Century Motorsport	19	12	4	12	17	610	**1st**
2023	Porsche Carrera Cup Great Britain – Pro	Century Motorsport	16	5	1	2	8	102	**2nd**
2024	Porsche Carrera Cup Germany	ID Racing	16	0	0	0	0	87	12th
2025	GT World Challenge Europe Endurance Cup	Paradine Competition	5	0	0	0	0	0	NC
2025	GT World Challenge Europe Endurance Cup – Silver	Paradine Competition	5	1	0	0	1	61	4th
2025	Intercontinental GT Challenge	Paradine Competition	1	0	0	0	0	0	NC
2025	Britcar Endurance Championship – Challenge	Amspeed	5	1	0	4	5	154‡	**3rd‡**
2025	24H Series – 992 Am	HRT Performance	1	1	0	0	1	54	NC
2025–26	24H Series Middle East – GT3	Paradine Competition	1	0	0	0	0	12	NC
2025–26	24H Series Middle East – GT3 Am	Paradine Competition	1	0	0	0	0	48	NC
2026	GT World Challenge Europe Endurance Cup	Paradine Competition	5	0	0	0	0	9	26th
2026	GT World Challenge Europe Endurance Cup – Bronze	Paradine Competition	5	0	1	0	2	84	**2nd**
2026	Intercontinental GT Challenge	Paradine Competition	1	0	0	0	0	0	NC
2026	24H Series – 992 Am	HRT Performance	4	2	0	0	2	120	6th

* Season still in progress.
^{†} As Kellett was a guest driver, he was ineligible for points.
^{‡} Team standings.

=== Complete Ginetta Junior Championship results ===
(key) (Races in bold indicate pole position) (Races in italics indicate fastest lap)

Year	Team	1	2	3	4	5	6	7	8	9	10	11	12	13	14	15	16	17	18	19	20	DC	Points
2013	HHC Motorsport	BHI; 1; 12	BHI; 2; 5	DON; 1; 5	DON; 2; 2	THR; 1; 5	THR; 2; 6	OUL; 1; 5	OUL; 2; 6	CRO; 1; 7	CRO; 2; 10	SNE; 1; 8	SNE; 2; 5	KNO; 1; 5	KNO; 2; 10	**ROC**; **1**; 1	ROC; 2; 8	SIL; 1; 6	SIL; 2; 3	BHGP; 1; 4	BHGP; 2; 4	6th	365
2014	HHC Motorsport	BHI; 1; 2	BHI; 2; 15	DON; 1; 4	DON; 2 Ret	THR; 1; 9	THR; 2; 4	OUL; 1; 2	OUL; 2; 2	CRO; 1; 1	CRO; 2; 8	SNE; 1; 1	SNE; 2; 2	KNO; 1; 7	**KNO**; **2**; 1	ROC; 1; 16	**ROC**; **2**; 1	**SIL**; **1**; 2	**SIL**; **2**; 1	BHGP; 1; 2	BHGP; 2; 13	2nd	456

=== Complete Porsche Carrera Cup Great Britain results ===
(key) (Races in bold indicate pole position) (Races in italics indicate fastest lap)

Year	Entrant	Class	1	2	3	4	5	6	7	8	9	10	11	12	13	14	15	16	Pos.	Points
2023	Rosland Gold by Century Motorsport	Pro	DON; 1 Ret	DON; 2; 7	**BRH**; **1**; 4	**BRH**; **2**; 1	THR; 1; 4	THR; 2; 17	OUL; 1; 1	OUL; 2; 5	KNO; 1; 5	**KNO**; **2**; 1	DON; 1; 1	DON; 2; 3	SIL; 1; 3	SIL; 2; 10	BRH; 1; 1	BRH; 2; 3	2nd	102

=== Complete Porsche Carrera Cup Germany results ===
(key) (Races in bold indicate pole position) (Races in italics indicate fastest lap)

Year	Team	1	2	3	4	5	6	7	8	9	10	11	12	13	14	15	16	DC	Points
2024	ID Racing	IMO; 1; 9	IMO; 2; 8	OSC; 1; 12	OSC; 2; 8	ZAN; 1; 9	ZAN; 2; 9	HUN; 1; 9	HUN; 2; 12	NÜR; 1; 15	NÜR; 2; 14	SAC; 1 Ret	SAC; 2; 11	RBR; 1; 7	RBR; 2; 11	HOC; 1; 4	HOC; 2 Ret	12th	87

=== Complete GT World Challenge Europe results ===
==== GT World Challenge Europe Endurance Cup ====
(Races in bold indicate pole position) (Races in italics indicate fastest lap)

Year	Team	Car	Class	1	2	3	4	5	6	7	Pos.	Points
2025	Paradine Competition	BMW M4 GT3 Evo	Silver	LEC; 18	MNZ; 22	SPA; 6H; 34	SPA; 12H; 27	SPA; 24H; Ret	NÜR; 21	CAT; 35	4th	61
2026	Paradine Competition	BMW M4 GT3 Evo	Bronze	LEC; 23	MNZ; 26	SPA; 6H; 19	SPA; 12H; 2	SPA; 24H; 13	NÜR; 36	**ALG**; 31	2nd	84
