= 2022 Ginetta GT4 Supercup =

The 2022 Millers Oils Ginetta GT4 Supercup was the final season of the multi-event, one make GT motor racing championship held across England and Scotland. The championship features a mix of professional motor racing teams and privately funded drivers, competing in Ginetta G55s that conform to the technical regulations for the championship. It forms part of the extensive program of support categories built up around the BTCC centrepiece. The 2022 season began on 14 May at Brands Hatch, and will end on 9 October, at the same track, with races broadcast on ITV and ITV4 throughout the season.

== Teams and drivers ==
2022 was the first year of the new Ginetta G56, with the field running a mixture of G56s and the previous G55s.

Team	No.	Drivers	Rounds
G56 Pro
Rosland Gold Racing by Century Motorsport	6	(United Kingdom) James Kellett	All
DTO Motorsport	7	(United Kingdom) Aston Millar	All
Breakell Racing	12	(United Kingdom) Reece Somerfield	1–2, 5–7
Elite Motorsport	21	(United Kingdom) Josh Rattican	1–2
Elite Motorsport	27	(United Kingdom) Tom Emson	All
Century Motorsport	58	(United Kingdom) Henry Dawes	1–4, 6-7
G56 Am
Ultimate Speed Racing	20	(United Kingdom) Mike Brown	1–5
Assetto Motorsport	22	(United Kingdom) Darren Leung	All
Breakell Racing	32	(United Kingdom) Wes Pearce	All
CWS 4x4	78	(United Kingdom) Colin White	1–5
G55 Pro
Wolf Motorsport	26	(United Kingdom) Luke Reade	All
Motus One	33	(United Kingdom) Josh Poulain	3–4, 6
Fox Motorsport	40	(United Kingdom) Nick Halstead	1–4, 6-7
Team HARD Racing 1-6; SVG with Software AG 7	66	(United Kingdom) James Taylor	All
Xentek Motorsport	77	(United Kingdom) Conner Garlick	All
Rosland Gold Racing by Century Motorsport	84	(United Kingdom) Blake Angliss	All
G55 Am
Fox Motorsport	8	(United Kingdom) Ian Duggan	All
Fox Motorsport	24	(United Kingdom) James Townsend	All
Race Car Consultants	11	(United Kingdom) Luke Warr	All
Assetto Motorsport	23	(United Kingdom) Garry Townsend	1–2
Simon Green Motorsport	31	(United Kingdom) Daniel Morris	All
Motus One	33	(United Kingdom) Josh Poulain	2
Breakell Racing	60	(United Kingdom) Sam Callahan	1

== Race calendar and results ==
Round		Circuit	Date	Pole position	Fastest lap	Winning driver	Winning team	G56 Pro Winner	G56 AM Winner	G55 Pro Winner	G55 AM Winner
1	R1	Brands Hatch (Indy Circuit, Kent)	14-15 May	(United Kingdom) James Kellett	(United Kingdom) James Kellett	(United Kingdom) James Kellett	Rosland Gold Racing by Century Motorsport	(United Kingdom) James Kellett	(United Kingdom) Darren Leung	(United Kingdom) Luke Reade	(United Kingdom) Daniel Morris
1	R2	Brands Hatch (Indy Circuit, Kent)	14-15 May		(United Kingdom) Josh Rattican	(United Kingdom) James Kellett	Rosland Gold Racing by Century Motorsport	(United Kingdom) James Kellett	(United Kingdom) Darren Leung	(United Kingdom) Blake Angliss	(United Kingdom) Ian Duggan
1	R3	Brands Hatch (Indy Circuit, Kent)	14-15 May		(United Kingdom) James Kellett	(United Kingdom) James Kellett	Rosland Gold Racing by Century Motorsport	(United Kingdom) James Kellett	(United Kingdom) Wes Pearce	(United Kingdom) Blake Angliss	(United Kingdom) Ian Duggan
2	R4	Oulton Park (Island Circuit, Cheshire)	11–12 June	(United Kingdom) James Kellett	(United Kingdom) James Kellett	(United Kingdom) James Kellett	Rosland Gold Racing by Century Motorsport	(United Kingdom) James Kellett	(United Kingdom) Wes Pearce	(United Kingdom) Luke Reade	(United Kingdom) Josh Poulain
2	R5	Oulton Park (Island Circuit, Cheshire)	11–12 June		(United Kingdom) Josh Rattican	(United Kingdom) James Kellett	Rosland Gold Racing by Century Motorsport	(United Kingdom) James Kellett	(United Kingdom) Wes Pearce	(United Kingdom) Luke Reade	(United Kingdom) Ian Duggan
3	R6	Knockhill Racing Circuit (Fife)	30-31 July	(United Kingdom) James Kellett	(United Kingdom) James Kellett	(United Kingdom) James Kellett	Rosland Gold Racing by Century Motorsport	(United Kingdom) James Kellett	(United Kingdom) Darren Leung	(United Kingdom) Luke Reade	(United Kingdom) Daniel Morris
3	R7	Knockhill Racing Circuit (Fife)	30-31 July		(United Kingdom) James Kellett	(United Kingdom) James Kellett	Rosland Gold Racing by Century Motorsport	(United Kingdom) James Kellett	(United Kingdom) Wes Pearce	(United Kingdom) Luke Reade	(United Kingdom) Daniel Morris
3	R8	Knockhill Racing Circuit (Fife)	30-31 July		(United Kingdom) Wes Pearce	(United Kingdom) Wes Pearce	Breakell Racing	None	(United Kingdom) Wes Pearce	(United Kingdom) Luke Reade	(United Kingdom) Daniel Morris
4	R9	Snetterton Motor Racing Circuit (300 Circuit, Norfolk)	13-14 August	(United Kingdom) James Kellett	(United Kingdom) James Kellett	(United Kingdom) James Kellett	Rosland Gold Racing by Century Motorsport	(United Kingdom) James Kellett	(United Kingdom) Darren Leung	(United Kingdom) Josh Poulain	(United Kingdom) James Townsend
4	R10	Snetterton Motor Racing Circuit (300 Circuit, Norfolk)	13-14 August		(United Kingdom) James Kellett	(United Kingdom) James Kellett	Rosland Gold Racing by Century Motorsport	(United Kingdom) James Kellett	(United Kingdom) Darren Leung	(United Kingdom) James Taylor	(United Kingdom) Daniel Morris
4	R11	Snetterton Motor Racing Circuit (300 Circuit, Norfolk)	13-14 August		(United Kingdom) James Kellett	(United Kingdom) Tom Emson	Elite Motorsport	(United Kingdom) Tom Emson	(United Kingdom) Darren Leung	(United Kingdom) Blake Angliss	(United Kingdom) Ian Duggan
5	R12	Thruxton Circuit (Hampshire)	27-28 August	(United Kingdom) James Kellett	(United Kingdom) James Kellett	(United Kingdom) James Kellett	Rosland Gold Racing by Century Motorsport	(United Kingdom) James Kellett	(United Kingdom) Darren Leung	(United Kingdom) Blake Angliss	(United Kingdom) Daniel Morris
5	R13	Thruxton Circuit (Hampshire)	27-28 August		(United Kingdom) Tom Emson	(United Kingdom) James Kellett	Rosland Gold Racing by Century Motorsport	(United Kingdom) James Kellett	(United Kingdom) Darren Leung	(United Kingdom) Luke Reade	(United Kingdom) James Townsend
5	R14	Thruxton Circuit (Hampshire)	27-28 August	Race canceled and rescheduled to Silverstone (Note: The race was stopped in the third minute following a heavy crash involving Colin White and Mike Brown. The race was restarted, but due to timetable constraints the final reverse grid race was rescheduled to the following round at Silverstone. https://www.ginetta.com/news/kellett-continues-ginetta-gt4-supercup-title-charge-at-thruxton)							
6	R14	Silverstone Circuit (National Circuit, Northamptonshire)	24-25 September		(United Kingdom) James Kellett	(United Kingdom) James Kellett	Rosland Gold Racing by Century Motorsport	(United Kingdom) James Kellett	(United Kingdom) Wes Pearce	(United Kingdom) Blake Angliss	(United Kingdom) Daniel Morris
6	R15	Silverstone Circuit (National Circuit, Northamptonshire)	24-25 September	(United Kingdom) James Kellett	(United Kingdom) Tom Emson	(United Kingdom) Tom Emson	Elite Motorsport	(United Kingdom) Tom Emson	(United Kingdom) Darren Leung	(United Kingdom) Blake Angliss	(United Kingdom) Daniel Morris
6	R16	Silverstone Circuit (National Circuit, Northamptonshire)	24-25 September		(United Kingdom) James Kellett	(United Kingdom) James Kellett	Rosland Gold Racing by Century Motorsport	(United Kingdom) James Kellett	(United Kingdom) Darren Leung	(United Kingdom) Blake Angliss	(United Kingdom) Daniel Morris
6	R17	Silverstone Circuit (National Circuit, Northamptonshire)	24-25 September		(United Kingdom) Tom Emson	(United Kingdom) Tom Emson	Elite Motorsport	(United Kingdom) Tom Emson	(United Kingdom) Darren Leung	(United Kingdom) Luke Reade	(United Kingdom) Daniel Morris
7	R18	Brands Hatch (Grand Prix Circuit, Kent)	8-9 October	(United Kingdom) Tom Emson	(United Kingdom) James Kellett	(United Kingdom) Tom Emson	Elite Motorsport	(United Kingdom) Tom Emson	(United Kingdom) Wes Pearce	(United Kingdom) Blake Angliss	(United Kingdom) James Townsend
7	R19	Brands Hatch (Grand Prix Circuit, Kent)	8-9 October		(United Kingdom) James Kellett	(United Kingdom) Tom Emson	Elite Motorsport	(United Kingdom) Tom Emson	(United Kingdom) Darren Leung	(United Kingdom) James Taylor	(United Kingdom) James Townsend
7	R20	Brands Hatch (Grand Prix Circuit, Kent)	8-9 October		(United Kingdom) Tom Emson	(United Kingdom) Aston Millar	DTO Motorsport	(United Kingdom) Aston Millar	(United Kingdom) Darren Leung	(United Kingdom) James Taylor	(United Kingdom) James Townsend

== Championship standings ==
Points system
1st	2nd	3rd	4th	5th	6th	7th	8th	9th	10th	11th	12th	13th	14th	15th	16th	17th	18th	19th	20th	R1 PP	FL
35	30	26	22	20	18	16	14	12	11	10	9	8	7	6	5	4	3	2	1	1	1

Notes

- A driver's best 19 scores counted towards the championship, with any other points being discarded.

=== Drivers' championships ===
Pos	Driver	BHI			OUL		KNO			SNE			THR			SIL				BHGP			Total	Drop	Pen.	Points
G56 Pro
1	James Kellett	1	1	1	1	1	1	1	DSQ	1	1	2	1	1	C	1	Ret	1	2	2	2	2	623	1	12	610
2	Tom Emson	18	6	4	3	7	3	3	Ret	3	3	1	3	3	C	2	1	2	1	1	1	3	531			531
3	Aston Millar	3	2	3	2	2	2	2	Ret	2	2	Ret	2	2	C	3	6	7	7	Ret	4	1	467		12	455
4	Henry Dawes	4	4	Ret	9	3	4	4	Ret	7	4	6					4	5	5	4	5	9	337		12	325
5	Reece Somerfield	2	3	5	4	DSQ							WD	WD	WD		2	3	3	3	3	Ret	232		12	220
6	Josh Rattican	19	5	2	5	Ret																	90			90
G56 Am
1	Wes Pearce	16	19	12	6	9	6	5	1	5	6	4	8	6	C	4	5	6	6	6	7	5	623	22		601
2	Darren Leung	7	7	17	10	Ret	5	6	Ret	4	5	3	4	4	C	Ret	3	4	4	Ret	6	4	558		18	540
3	Colin White	17	8	Ret	11	11	7	7	2	6	7	5	7	Ret	C								300			300
4	Mike Brown	12	18	15	20	10	13	12	Ret	Ret	12	10	15	Ret	C								248			248
G55 Pro
1	Luke Reade	5	10	11	7	4	8	8	3	Ret	10	8	6	5	C	7	Ret	9	8	8	10	8	558			558
2	Blake Angliss	8	9	6	8	6	10	Ret	5	DSQ	9	7	5	7	C	5	7	8	11	5	9	7	568	1	12	555
3	James Taylor	6	12	7	Ret	5	11	10	4	10	8	11	10	9	C	6	8	Ret	9	7	8	6	515			515
4	Connor Garlick	11	13	DNS	14	12	9	9	6	9	Ret	9	9	8	C	Ret	Ret	10	10	9	11	10	402		6	396
5	Nick Halstead	15	17	10	17	8	Ret	16	9	11	16	Ret					13	14	15	11	Ret	Ret	276			276
6	Josh Poulain						12	11	DSQ	8	11	12					9	Ret	DNS				146		12	134
G55 Am
1	Ian Duggan	10	11	8	18	13	15	15	8	13	14	13	12	11	C	9	11	13	13	12	15	Ret	567		6	561
2	Daniel Morris	9	15	13	13	Ret	14	13	7	Ret	13	14	11	Ret	C	8	10	11	12	Ret	13	12	539			539
3	James Townsend	14	14	9	16	Ret	17	14	Ret	12	15	Ret	14	10	C	11	12	12	14	10	12	11	488			488
4	Luke Warr	13	Ret	14	19	14	16	17	Ret	14	17	15	13	Ret	C	10	14	15	16	13	14	13	414		12	402
5	Garry Townsend	Ret	16	16	15	Ret																	68			68
6	Josh Poulain				12	Ret																	37		6	31
7	Sam Callahan	Ret	20	Ret																			20			20
