= Darren Leung =

British racing driver (born 1987)

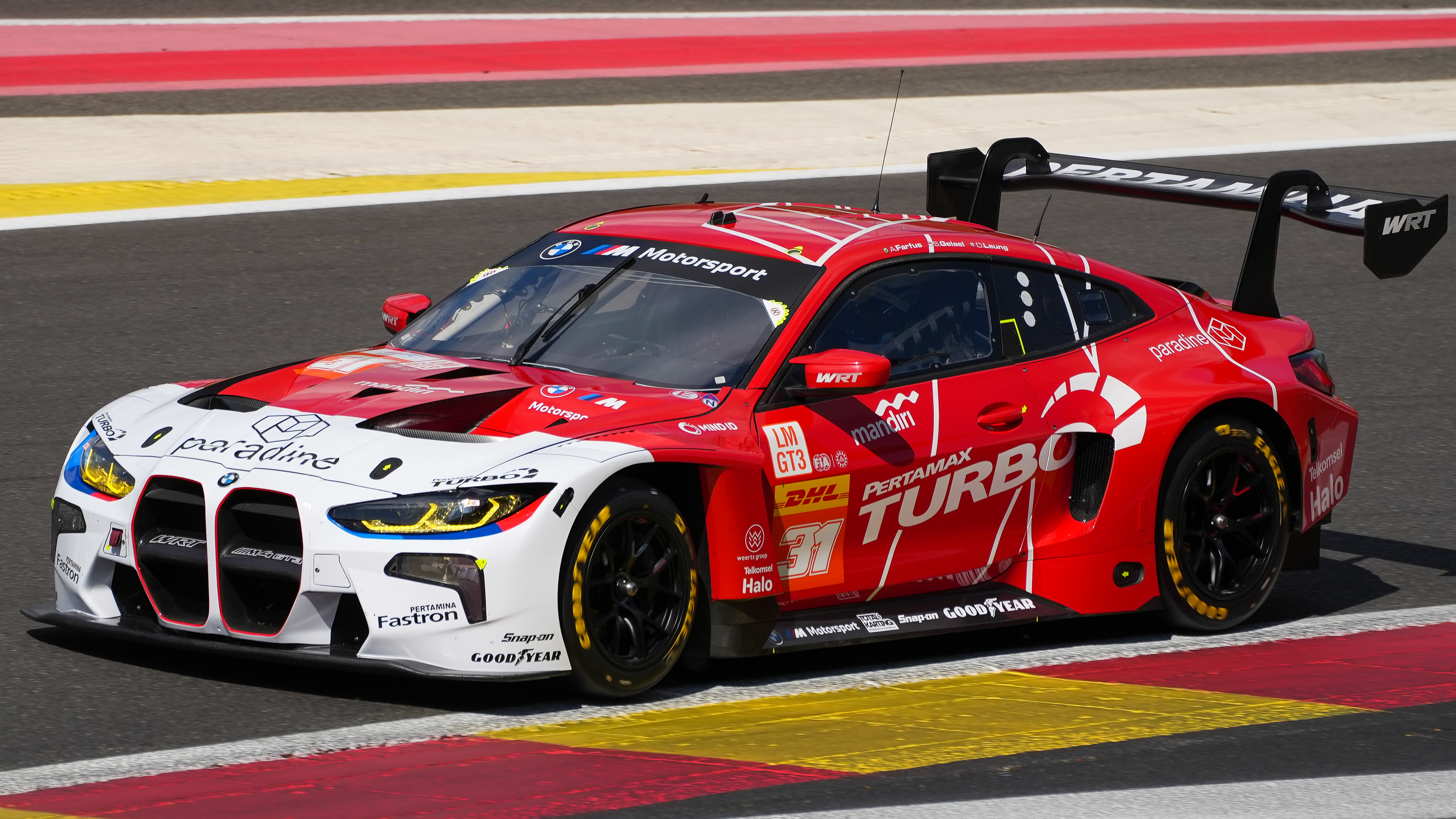
- Nationality: (United Kingdom) British
- Born: Darren Stephen Leung; 25 September 1987 (age 39) Harrogate, England

FIA World Endurance Championship career
- Debut season: 2024
- Current team: Team WRT
- Categorisation: FIA Bronze
- Car number: 31
- Starts: 13

Championship titles
- 2024 2023 2023: GT World Challenge Europe Sprint Cup - Bronze Cup; British GT Championship; British GT Championship - Pro-Am

Darren Stephen Leung (born 25 September 1987) is a British racing driver. He won the British GT Championship in 2023 in the GT3 category and the GT World Challenge Europe Sprint Cup - Bronze Cup in 2024, both alongside Dan Harper. Leung previously was chief executive officer of Leeds-based software company Paradine, which also operate a racing team under his direction as Paradine Competition.

== Racing career ==
Leung began his motorsport career in 2021 in the rookie class of the Ginetta GT Academy, where he drove a Ginetta G56 for Want2Race. He achieved ten podium finishes in fifteen races and finished second in the championship with 315 points. He also drove for Asselto Motorsport as a guest driver in two weekends of the Pro-Am class of the Ginetta GT4 Supercup, achieving a podium finish at both Donington Park and Brands Hatch.

In 2022, Leung drove a full season in the G65 Am class of the Ginetta GT4 Supercup. He achieved thirteen wins in twenty races, but due to a number of retirements, he finished second in the standings with 540 points. At the end of the year, he made his debut in the British GT Championship. In the penultimate race at Brands Hatch, he drove in the GT4 class for Assetto Motorsport as team-mate to Charlie Robertson, before taking victory in the GT3 class for Century Motorsport as team-mate to Alexander Sims in the final race at Donington.

In 2023, Leung competed in the GT3 class of the British GT as team-mate of Dan Harper at Century. He won two races at Silverstone and Brands Hatch, and also took podiums at Snetterton Circuit and Donington, taking 176 points to be crowned champion. He also drove as a guest driver in two weekends of the GT3 class of the GT Cup Championship UK, where he took two wins and four other podiums. He also drove for Team WRT in the Nürburgring round of the GT World Challenge Europe Endurance Cup, finishing sixth in the Bronze Cup.

In 2024, Leung started the season in the GT class of the Asian Le Mans Series with Team Project 1, teamed up with Harper and Christian Bogle. With a best result of seventh at the Dubai Autodrome, he finished 21st in the standings with eleven points. He then made his debut in the FIA World Endurance Championship in the LMGT3 class with Team WRT, teaming up with Augusto Farfus and Sean Gelael. He took his first win in the championship in the second race, the 6 Hours of Imola. He also competed in the GT World Challenge Europe and returned to defend his title in British GT; he drove in both series for Century.

== Racing record ==
=== Career summary ===
Season	Series	Team	Races	Wins	Poles	F/Laps	Podiums	Points	Position
2021	Ginetta GT4 Supercup - Pro-Am	Assetto Motorsport	6	0	0	0	2	0	NC†
2022	Ginetta GT4 Supercup - G56 Am	Assetto Motorsport	19	13	16	11	15	558	**2nd**
2022	British GT Championship - GT4	Assetto Motorsport	1	0	0	0	0	0	NC†
2022	British GT Championship - GT3	Century Motorsport	1	1	0	0	1	37.5	16th
2023	British GT Championship - GT3	Century Motorsport	9	2	0	2	4	176	**1st**
2023	GT Cup Championship - GT3	Century Motorsport	8	2	2	1	6	0	NC†
2023	GT World Challenge Europe Endurance Cup	Team WRT	1	0	0	0	0	0	NC
2023	GT World Challenge Europe Endurance Cup - Bronze	Team WRT	1	0	0	0	0	8	27th
2023-24	Asian Le Mans Series - GT	Team Project 1	5	0	0	0	0	11	21st
2023-24	Middle East Trophy - GT3 Am	Century Motorsport	1	1	0	0	1	0	NC†
2024	FIA World Endurance Championship - LMGT3	Team WRT	8	1	0	1	2	85	4th
2024	GT World Challenge Europe Endurance Cup	Century Motorsport	5	0	0	0	0	6	26th
2024	GT World Challenge Europe Endurance Cup - Bronze	Century Motorsport	5	0	0	0	1	32	11th
2024	GT World Challenge Europe Sprint Cup	Century Motorsport	8	0	0	0	0	0	NC
2024	GT World Challenge Europe Sprint Cup - Bronze	Century Motorsport	8	2	1	1	6	74.5	**1st**
2024	British GT Championship - GT3	Century Motorsport	1	0	0	0	0	0	NC†
2024	FIA Motorsport Games GT Sprint	Team United Kingdom	1	0	0	0	0	N/A	4th
2025	FIA World Endurance Championship - LMGT3	United Autosports	8	1	1	0	1	43	11th
2025	Middle East Trophy - GT3	AlManar Racing by Team WRT	1	1	0	0	1	0	NC†
2025	Middle East Trophy - GT3 Am	Paradine Competition	1	1	1	0	1	0	NC†
2025	GT World Challenge Europe Endurance Cup	Paradine Competition	5	0	0	0	0	0	NC
2025	GT World Challenge Europe Endurance Cup - Bronze	Paradine Competition	5	0	0	0	1	46	7th
2025	GT World Challenge Europe Sprint Cup	Paradine Competition	8	0	0	0	0	0	NC
2025	GT World Challenge Europe Sprint Cup - Bronze	Paradine Competition	8	0	1	0	2	38	6th
2025	British GT Championship - GT3	Paradine Competition	1	1	0	0	1	0	NC†
2025	British GT Championship - GT3	Blackthorn	1	0	0	0	0	0	NC†
2025	International GT Open	Track Focused	1	0	0	0	0	0	NC†
2025-26	Asian Le Mans Series - GT	AF Corse	6	0	0	1	1	43	9th
2025-26	24H Series Middle East - GT3	Paradine Competition	1	0	0	0	0	0	NC†
2026	FIA World Endurance Championship - LMGT3	Team WRT							
2026	GT World Challenge Europe Endurance Cup	Paradine Competition	5	0	0	0	0	0	NC
2026	British GT Championship - GT3	Paradine Competition	1	0	1	0	1	0	NC†
2026	GT World Challenge Europe Sprint Cup	Paradine Competition	8	0	0	0	0	0	NC
2026-27	Asian Le Mans Series - GT3	2 Seas Motorsport							

† As Leung was a guest driver, he was ineligible to score points.

=== Complete British GT Championship results ===
Year	Team	Car	Class	1	2	3	4	5	6	7	8	9	Pos.	Points
2022	Assetto Motorsport	Ginetta G56 GT4	GT4	OUL; 1	OUL; 2	SIL; 1; 5	DON; 1	SNE; 1	SNE; 2	SPA; 1	BRH; 1; 18		NC†	0†
2022	Century Motorsport	BMW M4 GT3	GT3									DON; 1; 1	16th	37.5
2023	Century Motorsport	BMW M4 GT3	GT3	OUL; 1; 6	OUL; 2; 6	SIL; 1; 1	DON; 1; 5	SNE; 1; 2	SNE; 2; 5	ALG; 1; 5	BRH; 1; 1	DON; 1; 2	1st	176
2024	Century Motorsport	BMW M4 GT3	GT3	OUL; 1	OUL; 2	SIL; 1; 13	DON; 1	SPA; 1	SNE; 1	SNE; 2	DON; 1	BRH; 1	NC†	0†
2025	Paradine Competition	BMW M4 GT3 Evo	GT3	DON; 1	SIL; 1; 1	OUL; 1	OUL; 2	SPA; 1	SNE; 1	SNE; 2	BRH; 1		NC†	0†
2025	Blackthorn	Aston Martin Vantage AMR GT3 Evo	GT3									DON; 1; 5	NC†	0†
2026	Paradine Competition	BMW M4 GT3 Evo	GT3	**SIL**; **1**; 3	OUL; 1	OUL; 2	SPA; 1	SNE; 1	SNE; 2	DON; 1	BRH; 1		NC†	0†

† As Leung was a guest driver, he was ineligible to score points.

=== Complete GT World Challenge Europe results ===
==== GT World Challenge Europe Endurance Cup ====
Year	Team	Car	Class	1	2	3	4	5	6	7	Pos.	Points
2023	Team WRT	BMW M4 GT3	Bronze	MNZ	LEC	SPA; 6H	SPA; 12H	SPA; 24H	NÜR; 28	CAT	27th	8
2024	Century Motorsport	BMW M4 GT3	Bronze	LEC; 49	SPA; 6H; 49	SPA; 12H; 44	SPA; 24H; 33	NÜR; 30	MNZ; 7	JED; Ret	11th	32
2025	Paradine Competition	BMW M4 GT3 Evo	Bronze	LEC; 27	MNZ; 25	SPA; 6H; 46	SPA; 12H; 56	SPA; 24H; Ret	NÜR; Ret	CAT; 26	7th	46
2026	Paradine Competition	BMW M4 GT3 Evo	Bronze	LEC; 23	MNZ; 26	SPA; 6H; 19	SPA; 12H; 2	SPA; 24H; 13	NÜR; 36	**ALG**; 31	2nd	84

==== GT World Challenge Europe Sprint Cup ====
Year	Team	Car	Class	1	2	3	4	5	6	7	8	9	10	Pos.	Points
2024	Century Motorsport	BMW M4 GT3	Bronze	BRH; 1	BRH; 2	MIS; 1; 17	MIS; 2; 20	HOC; 1; 15	HOC; 2; 11	**MAG**; **1**; 21	MAG; 2; 26	CAT; 1; 21	CAT; 2; 22	1st	74.5
2025	Paradine Competition	BMW M4 GT3 Evo	Bronze	BRH; 1	BRH; 2	ZAN; 1; 19	ZAN; 2; 31	MIS; 1; 20	MIS; 2; 37	MAG; 1; 31	MAG; 2; 37	VAL; 1 Ret	**VAL**; **2**; 36	6th	38
2026	Paradine Competition	BMW M4 GT3 Evo	Bronze	BRH; 1	BRH; 2	MIS; 1; 25	MIS; 2; 38	MAG; 1; 31	MAG; 2; 23	ZAN; 1; 18	ZAN; 2; 35	CAT; 1; 20	CAT; 2; 29	4th	65

=== Complete Asian Le Mans Series results ===
Year	Team	Class	Car	Engine	1	2	3	4	5	6	Pos.	Points
2023–24	Team Project 1	GT	BMW M4 GT3	BMW P58 3.0 L Turbo L6	SEP; 1; 18	SEP; 2; 10	DUB; 1; 7	ABU; 1; 8	ABU; 2; 15		21st	11
2025–26	AF Corse	GT	Ferrari 296 GT3	Ferrari F154 3.0 L Turbo V6	SEP; 1 Ret	SEP; 2; 7	DUB; 1; 3	DUB; 2; 17	ABU; 1; 6	ABU; 2; 4	9th	43

=== Complete FIA World Endurance Championship results ===
(key) (Races in bold indicate pole position; races in italics indicate fastest lap)

Year	Entrant	Class	Chassis	Engine	1	2	3	4	5	6	7	8	Rank	Points
2024	Team WRT	LMGT3	BMW M4 GT3	BMW P58 3.0 L Turbo L6	QAT; 6	IMO; 1	SPA; Ret	LMS; 2	SÃO; 10	COA; 5	FUJ; 10	BHR; 13	4th	85
2025	United Autosports	LMGT3	McLaren 720S GT3 Evo	McLaren M40T 4.0 L Turbo V8	**QAT**; 7	IMO; 9	SPA; Ret	LMS; Ret	SÃO; 9	COA; 1	FUJ; 10	BHR; 9	11th	43
2026	Team WRT	LMGT3	BMW M4 GT3 Evo	BMW P58 3.0 L Turbo I6	IMO; 5	SPA; 14	LMS; 7	SÃO; 12	COA	FUJ	CAT	MNZ	16th*	22*

=== Complete 24 Hours of Le Mans results ===
Year	Team	Co-drivers	Car	Class	Laps	Pos.	Class pos.
2024	(Belgium) Team WRT	(Brazil) Augusto Farfus (Indonesia) Sean Gelael	BMW M4 GT3	LMGT3	280	28th	**2nd**
2025	(United Kingdom) United Autosports	(Indonesia) Sean Gelael (Japan) Marino Sato	McLaren 720S GT3 Evo	LMGT3	80	DNF	DNF
2026	(Belgium) Team WRT	(Brazil) Augusto Farfus (Indonesia) Sean Gelael	BMW M4 GT3 Evo	LMGT3	334	39th	7th

Sporting positions
Preceded by Ian Loggie	British GT Championship; Champion; 2023; With: Dan Harper	Succeeded by Rob Collard; Ricky Collard
Preceded by Ian Loggie	British GT Championship; Pro-Am Champion; 2023; With: Dan Harper	Succeeded by Rob Collard; Ricky Collard
Preceded by Alex Malykhin	GT World Challenge Europe Sprint Cup; Bronze Cup Champion; 2024; With: Dan Harper	Succeeded by Incumbent
