= Century Motorsport =

(United Kingdom) Century Motorsport
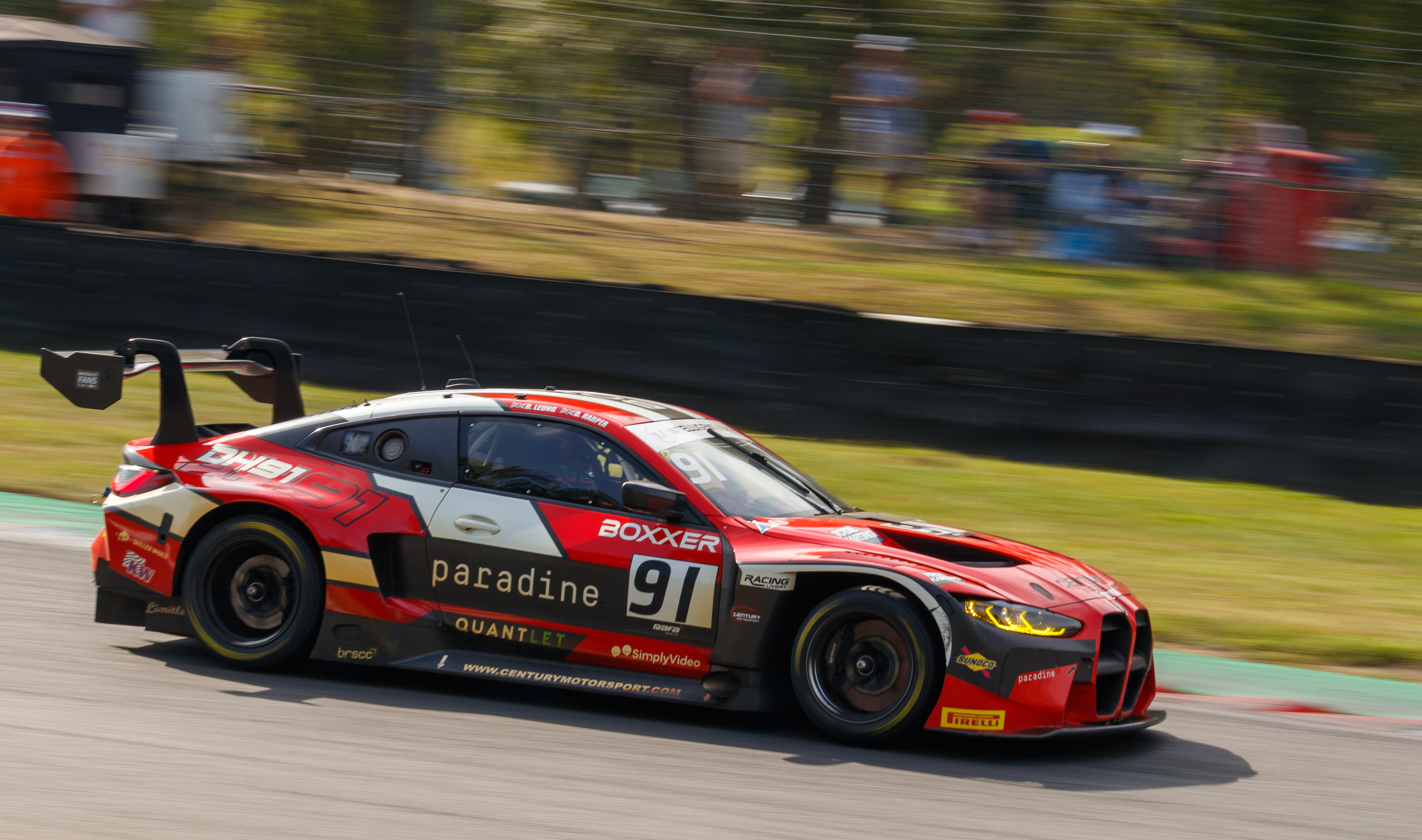
- Founded: 1995
- Base: Fenny Compton, Warwickshire
- Team principal(s): Nathan Freke, Clive Freke
- Current series: Ginetta GT Supercup; British GT Championship; Ginetta GT5 Challenge; Creventic 24 hour series
- Noted drivers: Jamie Orton, Tom Oliphant, Martin Poole, Zoë Wenham, Declan Jones, Nathan Freke, Guy Wenham, Anna Walewska, Ben Green, Ben Tuck, Jack Mitchell, Ricky Collard, Aleksander Schjerpen, Dean Macdonald, David Holloway, Phil Ingram, Piers Johnson, Max Bird, James Kellett, Michael Crees, Angus Fender, Betty Chen, Andrew Gordon-Colebrooke, Jacob Mathiassen, Ollie Hancock, Ruben Anakhasyan
- Drivers' Championships: Nathan Freke, 2009 Ginetta G50 Cup; 2015 Ginetta GT4 Supercup; Dubai 24 Hours; Dubai Proto Series; Jack Mitchell, 2018 British GT4; James Kellett, 2018 GT5 Challenge; Michael Crees, 2018 GT4 Supercup Am Class

Century Motorsport is a professional motor racing team based in Fenny Compton, Warwickshire, in the United Kingdom. They currently participate in the Ginetta GT4 Supercup, the British GT Championship, the Ginetta GT5 Challenge Championship, G50 Cup and the Creventic 24 Hour Series.

The team was founded in 1995.

== Racing Record ==
=== Complete British GT Championship results ===
Year	Entrant	Class	No	Chassis	Engine	Drivers	1	2	3	4	5	6	7	8	9	Class Pos.	Class Pts	Teams Pos.	Teams Pts
2020	(United Kingdom) Century Motorsport	GT4 Silver	42	BMW M4 GT4	BMW N55 3.0 L Twin-Turbo I6	(United Kingdom) Andrew Gordon-Colebrooke	OUL; 1	OUL; 2	DON; 1	DON; 2	BRH; 1; 2	DON; 1	SNE; 1; 7	SNE; 2; 4	SIL; 1	8th	83	4th	150
2020	(United Kingdom) Century Motorsport	GT4 Silver	42	BMW M4 GT4	BMW N55 3.0 L Twin-Turbo I6	(United Kingdom) Ben Green					BRH; 1; 2					11th	27	4th	150
2020	(United Kingdom) Century Motorsport	GT4 Silver	42	BMW M4 GT4	BMW N55 3.0 L Twin-Turbo I6	(United Kingdom) Ben Tuck							SNE; 1; 7	SNE; 2; 4		12th	18	4th	150
2020	(United Kingdom) Century Motorsport	GT4 Pro-Am	42	BMW M4 GT4	BMW N55 3.0 L Twin-Turbo I6	(United Kingdom) Andrew Gordon-Colebrooke (United Kingdom) Rob Wheldon									SIL; 1; 1	2nd	18.75	4th	150
2020	(United Kingdom) Century Motorsport	GT4 Silver	43	BMW M4 GT4	BMW N55 3.0 L Twin-Turbo I6	(Canada) Ben Hurst	OUL; 1; 6	OUL; 2; 3	DON; 1; 7	DON; 2; 7	BRH; 1; 5	DON; 1 Ret	SNE; 1; 8	SNE; 2; 7	SIL; 1; 5	9th	78	4th	150
2020	(United Kingdom) Century Motorsport	GT4 Silver	43	BMW M4 GT4	BMW N55 3.0 L Twin-Turbo I6	(United Kingdom) Andrew Gordon-Colebrooke	OUL; 1; 6	OUL; 2; 3	DON; 1; 7	DON; 2; 7						8th	83	4th	150
2020	(United Kingdom) Century Motorsport	GT4 Silver	43	BMW M4 GT4	BMW N55 3.0 L Twin-Turbo I6	(United Kingdom) Adam Hatfield					BRH; 1; 5	DON; 1 Ret	SNE; 1; 8	SNE; 2; 7	SIL; 1; 5	10th	40	4th	150
2021	(United Kingdom) Century Motorsport	GT4 Pro-Am	9	BMW M4 GT4	BMW N55 3.0 L Twin-Turbo I6	(United Kingdom) Andrew Gordon-Colebrooke (United Kingdom) Chris Salkeld	BRH; 1	SIL; 4	DON; 1							5th	93	1st	313.5
2021	(United Kingdom) Century Motorsport	GT4 Silver	9	BMW M4 GT4	BMW N55 3.0 L Twin-Turbo I6	(United Kingdom) Andrew Gordon-Colebrooke (United Kingdom) Chris Salkeld				SPA; 4	SNE 1 Ret	SNE 2; 2	OUL 1 Ret	OUL 2; 8	DON; 7	8th	49	1st	313.5
2021	(United Kingdom) Century Motorsport	GT4 Silver	57	BMW M4 GT4	BMW N55 3.0 L Twin-Turbo I6	(United Kingdom) Will Burns (United Kingdom) Gustav Burton	BRH; 1	SIL; 2	DON; 1	SPA; 2	SNE 1; 2	SNE 2; 5	OUL 1; 1	OUL 2; 1	DON; 3	1st	229.5	1st	313.5
2021	(United Kingdom) Century Motorsport	GT4 Pro-Am	71	Aston Martin Vantage AMR GT4	Aston Martin 4.0 L Turbo V8	(United Kingdom) Bradley Ellis (United Kingdom) David Holloway	BRH	SIL	DON	SPA	SNE 1	SNE 2	OUL 1	OUL 2	DON; 3	NC			
2022	(United Kingdom) Century Motorsport	GT3 Silver-Am	91	BMW M4 GT3	BMW S58B30T0 3.0 L Twin Turbo I6	(Taiwan) Betty Chen (United Kingdom) Angus Fender	OUL 1 DNS	OUL 2; 5	SIL; 6	DON; 5						9th	42	8th	66
2022	(United Kingdom) Century Motorsport	GT3 Pro-Am	91	BMW M4 GT3	BMW S58B30T0 3.0 L Twin Turbo I6	(Taiwan) Betty Chen					SNE 1; 9	SNE 2; 11				22nd	3	8th	66
2022	(United Kingdom) Century Motorsport	GT3 Pro-Am	91	BMW M4 GT3	BMW S58B30T0 3.0 L Twin Turbo I6	(Sweden) Joel Eriksson					SNE 1; 9	SNE 2; 11	SPA; 7			19th	12	8th	66
2022	(United Kingdom) Century Motorsport	GT3 Pro-Am	91	BMW M4 GT3	BMW S58B30T0 3.0 L Twin Turbo I6	(United Kingdom) David Holloway							SPA; 7			20th	9	8th	66
2022	(United Kingdom) Century Motorsport	GT3 Pro-Am	91	BMW M4 GT3	BMW S58B30T0 3.0 L Twin Turbo I6	(United Kingdom) Henry Dawes								BRH; 3		17th	22.5	8th	66
2022	(United Kingdom) Century Motorsport	GT3 Pro-Am	91	BMW M4 GT3	BMW S58B30T0 3.0 L Twin Turbo I6	(United Kingdom) Alexander Sims								BRH; 3	DON; 1	12th	60	8th	66
2022	(United Kingdom) Century Motorsport	GT3 Pro-Am	91	BMW M4 GT3	BMW S58B30T0 3.0 L Twin Turbo I6	(United Kingdom) Darren Leung									DON; 1	15th	37.5	8th	66
2022	(United Kingdom) Century Motorsport	GT4 Silver	9	BMW M4 GT4	BMW N55 3.0 L Twin-Turbo I6	(United Kingdom) Tom Rawlings (United Kingdom) Chris Salkeld	OUL 1; 10	OUL 2; 8	SIL; 5	DON; 8	SNE 1; 4	SNE 2; 8	SPA; 8	BRH	DON; 4	10th	66	4th	150
2022	(United Kingdom) Century Motorsport	GT4 Silver	90	BMW M4 GT4	BMW N55 3.0 L Twin-Turbo I6	(United Kingdom) Jack Brown (United Kingdom) Will Burns	OUL 1; 5	OUL 2; 2	SIL; 4	DON; 2	SNE 1; 7	SNE 2; 1	SPA; 7	BRH; 6	DON; 5	4th	140	4th	150
2022	(United Kingdom) Century Motorsport	GT4 Pro-Am	21	Aston Martin Vantage AMR GT4	Aston Martin 4.0 L Turbo V8	(United Kingdom) Bradley Ellis (United Kingdom) David Holloway	OUL 1	OUL 2	SIL; 2	DON	SNE 1	SNE 2	SPA	BRH	DON	NC			
2023	(United Kingdom) Century Motorsport	GT3 Pro-Am	91	BMW M4 GT3	BMW S58B30T0 3.0 L Twin Turbo I6	(United Kingdom) Dan Harper (United Kingdom) Darren Leung	OUL 1; 6	OUL 2; 6	SIL; 1	DON; 5	SNE 1; 2	SNE 2; 5	ALG; 5	BRH; 1	DON; 2	1st	176	2nd	176
2023	(United Kingdom) Century Motorsport	GT4 Pro-Am	14	BMW M4 GT4 Gen II	BMW 3.0 L Twin-Turbo I6	(United Kingdom) Michael Johnston (United Kingdom) Chris Salkeld	OUL 1; 3	OUL 2; 3	SIL; 4	DON; 3	SNE 1; 1	SNE 2; 5	ALG; 1	BRH; 1	DON; 5	1st	203	1st	223.5
2023	(United Kingdom) Century Motorsport	GT4 Pro-Am	22	BMW M4 GT4 Gen II	BMW 3.0 L Twin-Turbo I6	(United Kingdom) Carl Cavers (United Kingdom) Lewis Plato	OUL 1; 2	OUL 2; 5	SIL; 3	DON; 2	SNE 1; 2	SNE 2; 1	ALG; Ret	BRH; 2	DON; 2	3rd	179	1st	223.5
2023	(United Kingdom) Century Motorsport	GT4 Pro-Am	21	Aston Martin Vantage AMR GT4	Aston Martin 4.0 L Turbo V8	(United Kingdom) Bradley Ellis (United Kingdom) David Holloway	OUL 1	OUL 2	SIL; 2	DON	SNE 1	SNE 2	ALG	BRH	DON	NC			

* Season still in progress
