= Bahrain International Circuit =

Motorsport track in Bahrain

The Home of Motorsport in the Middle East The Jewel in the Desert

- Grand Prix Circuit (2005–present)
- Location: Sakhir, Bahrain
- Coordinates: 26°1′57″N 50°30′38″E
- Capacity: 70,000
- FIA Grade: 1 (5 layouts)
- Broke ground: December 2002; 23 years ago
- Opened: 17 March 2004; 22 years ago
- Construction cost: 56.2 million Dinars ($150 million)
- Architect: Hermann Tilke
- Major events: Future: Formula One; Bahrain Grand Prix (2004–2010, 2012–2025, 2027); FIA WEC; 8 Hours of Bahrain (2012–2017, 2019–2025, 2027); Former: FIA GT (2005); V8 Supercars; Desert 400 (2006–2008, 2010); GP2 Asia (2008–2010); Formula One; Sakhir Grand Prix (2020); Gulf 12 Hours (2021)
- Website: https://www.bahraingp.com/

Grand Prix Circuit (2005–present)
- Length: 5.412 km (3.363 mi)
- Turns: 15
- Race lap record: 1:31.447 ( (Spain) Pedro de la Rosa, McLaren MP4-20, 2005, F1)

Outer Circuit (2005–present)
- Length: 3.543 km (2.202 mi)
- Turns: 11
- Race lap record: 0:55.404 ( (United Kingdom) George Russell, Mercedes W11, 2020, F1)

Endurance Circuit (2005–present)
- Length: 6.299 km (3.914 mi)
- Turns: 23
- Race lap record: 1:58.287 ( (Spain) Fernando Alonso, Ferrari F10, 2010, F1)

Paddock Circuit (2004–present)
- Length: 3.823 km (2.376 mi)
- Turns: 10
- Race lap record: 1:24.9102 ( (Australia) Jason Bright, Ford BA Falcon, 2006, V8 Supercars)

Oasis / Inner Circuit (2004–present)
- Length: 2.550 km (1.584 mi)
- Turns: 8
- Race lap record: 1:03.819 ( (United Arab Emirates) Bashar Mardini, Porsche 911 (991 I) GT3 Cup, 2017, PCC)

Original Grand Prix Circuit (2004)
- Length: 5.417 km (3.366 mi)
- Turns: 15
- Race lap record: 1:30.252 ( (Germany) Michael Schumacher, Ferrari F2004, 2004, F1)

The Bahrain International Circuit (Arabic: حلبة البحرين الدولية, romanized: Ḥalba al-Baḥrayn ad-Dawliyya) is a 5.412 km (3.363 mi) motorsport venue opened in 2004 and used for drag racing, GP2 Series (now FIA Formula 2), and the annual Formula One Bahrain Grand Prix. The 2004 Grand Prix was the first Formula One race held in the Middle East. Beginning in 2006, Australian V8 Supercars raced at the BIC, with the event known as the Desert 400. However, the V8 Supercars did not return for the 2011 V8 Supercar season. 24 Hour endurance races are also hosted at BIC. The circuit has a FIA Grade 1 license. The circuit also has multiple layouts.

== History ==
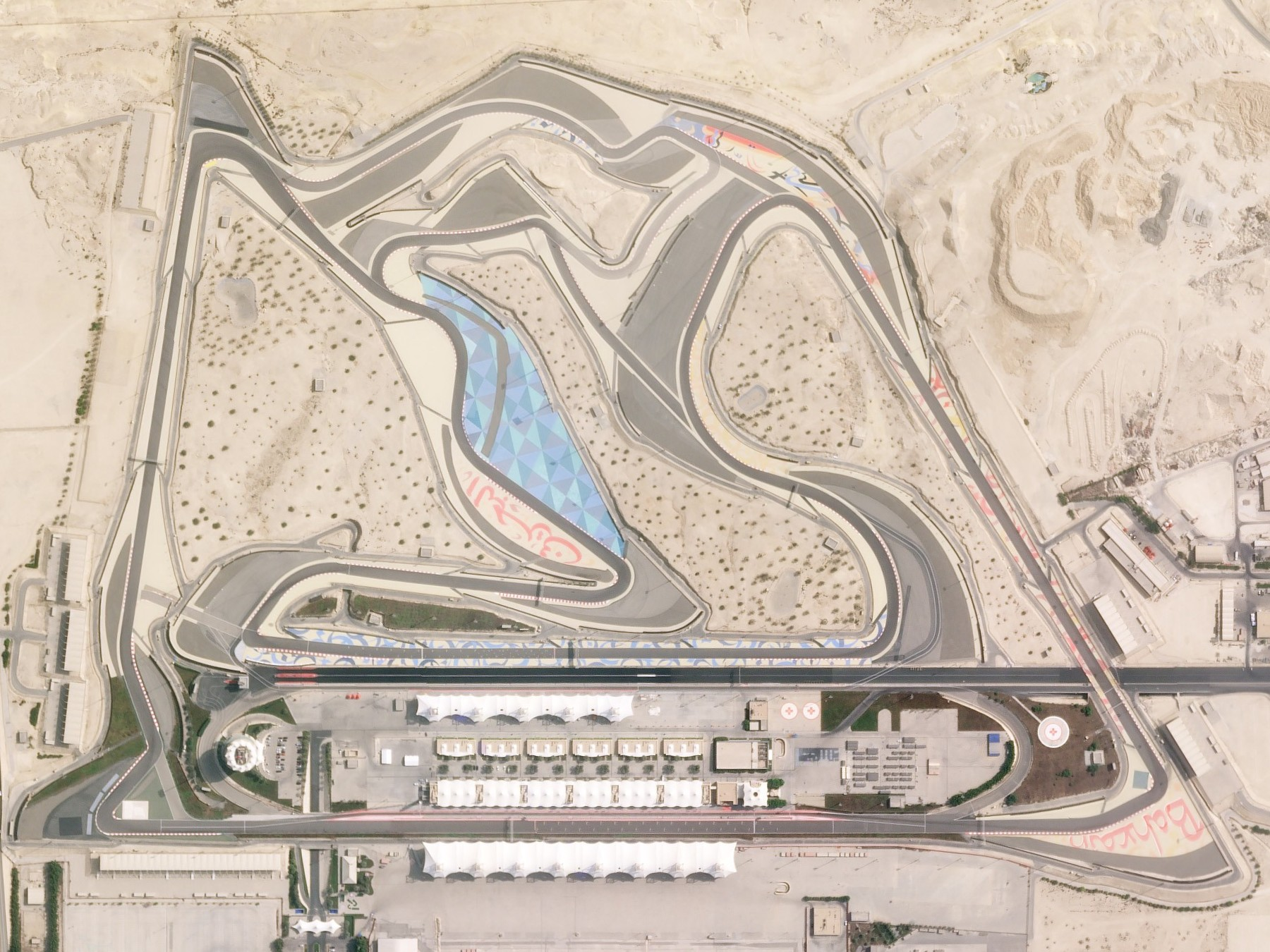
Satellite view of the circuit as it appeared in November 2017

The construction of the Bahrain circuit was a national objective for Bahrain, initiated by the Crown Prince, Shaikh Salman bin Hamad Al Khalifa. The Crown Prince is the Honorary President of the Bahrain Motor Federation. TRL was asked to build the circuit, headed by Patrick Brogan.

Race organizers were worried that the circuit would not be complete in time for the 2004 Bahrain Grand Prix and attempted to cancel the event; however, Formula One supremo Bernie Ecclestone refused this request. In the end, the circuit was not quite fully complete, but was good enough for the grand prix to go ahead.

After the 2004 race and ahead of the 2005 race the track was realigned at turn four, decreasing the circuit's overall length by 5 metres in total.

In 2007 the circuit became the first Grand Prix circuit to be awarded the distinguished FIA Institute Centre of Excellence award, given for excellent safety, race marshal, and medical facilities, and for the high standards of technology required to maintain these.

At the 2009 Grand Prix, BIC announced a collaboration with @bahrain to develop land next to the circuit. @bahrain is part of the Mumtalakat group of companies. @bahrain will dedicate more than 1 million square meters of business, entertainment and educational space with a value in excess of US$2bn (BHD 850million), making it one of the largest investment projects to take place in Bahrain in the past five years.

In 2011 the circuit was scheduled to be the first GP of the season. However, due to civil unrest in the country the race had to be cancelled in March 2011. On 4 June the FIA announced that the race would be scheduled for 30 October, the original slot for the inaugural Indian Grand Prix, which would be shifted to a season-closing date on 11 December. However, two days later following concerns from teams and other officials, the race organizers officially cancelled the race, choosing to focus their attention on the 2012 running. The 2012 Formula One calendar had the race scheduled for 22 April, the fourth of the season. During pre-season testing for the 2024 Formula 1 season, the second morning session was halted by a red flag and later cancelled as a drain cover in the approach to turn 10 of the circuit had been dislodged by Charles Leclerc's SF-24.

=== Construction and design ===
Sakhir Tower

VIP tower at Bahrain International Circuit

The circuit was designed by German architect Hermann Tilke, the same architect who designed the Sepang International Circuit in Malaysia. The main contractor for the project was Cebarco-WCT. The circuit cost approximately 56.2 million Bahraini Dinars (US$150 million) to construct. It has six separate tracks, including a test oval and a drag strip.

The circuit posed a unique problem. Positioned in the middle of a desert, there were worries that sand would blow onto the circuit and disrupt the race. However, organizers were able to keep the sand off the track by spraying an adhesive on the sand around the track.

The surface of the track is made of graywacke aggregate, shipped to Bahrain from Bayston Hill quarry in Shropshire, England. The surface material is highly acclaimed by circuit bosses and Formula 1 drivers for the high level of grip it offers. The same aggregate material is used at the Yas Marina Circuit, venue of the Abu Dhabi Grand Prix.

Shortly after the Formula One February 2014 testing, the first corner of the track was renamed after seven-time champion German driver Michael Schumacher in honour of his achievements and also in support after he suffered an almost fatal skiing accident late December 2013.

== Track layouts ==
Track	Distance	Grade
Grand Prix track	5.412 km (3.363 mi)	1
Oasis / Inner track	2.554 km (1.587 mi)	1
Outer track	3.543 km (2.202 mi)	1
Paddock Circuit	3.823 km (2.376 mi)	1
Drag Strip	1.2 km (0.7 mi)	n/a
Oval track	2.500 km (1.553 mi)	n/a
Endurance Circuit	6.299 km (3.914 mi)	1

"Grand Prix Circuit". Used in F1 in 2004–2009, and since 2012

"Endurance Circuit". Used in F1 in 2010

"Outer Circuit". Used in F1 in 2020 at the Sakhir Grand Prix

"Paddock Circuit"

"Oasis / Inner Circuit"

A flat oval

== Formula One Grand Prix ==
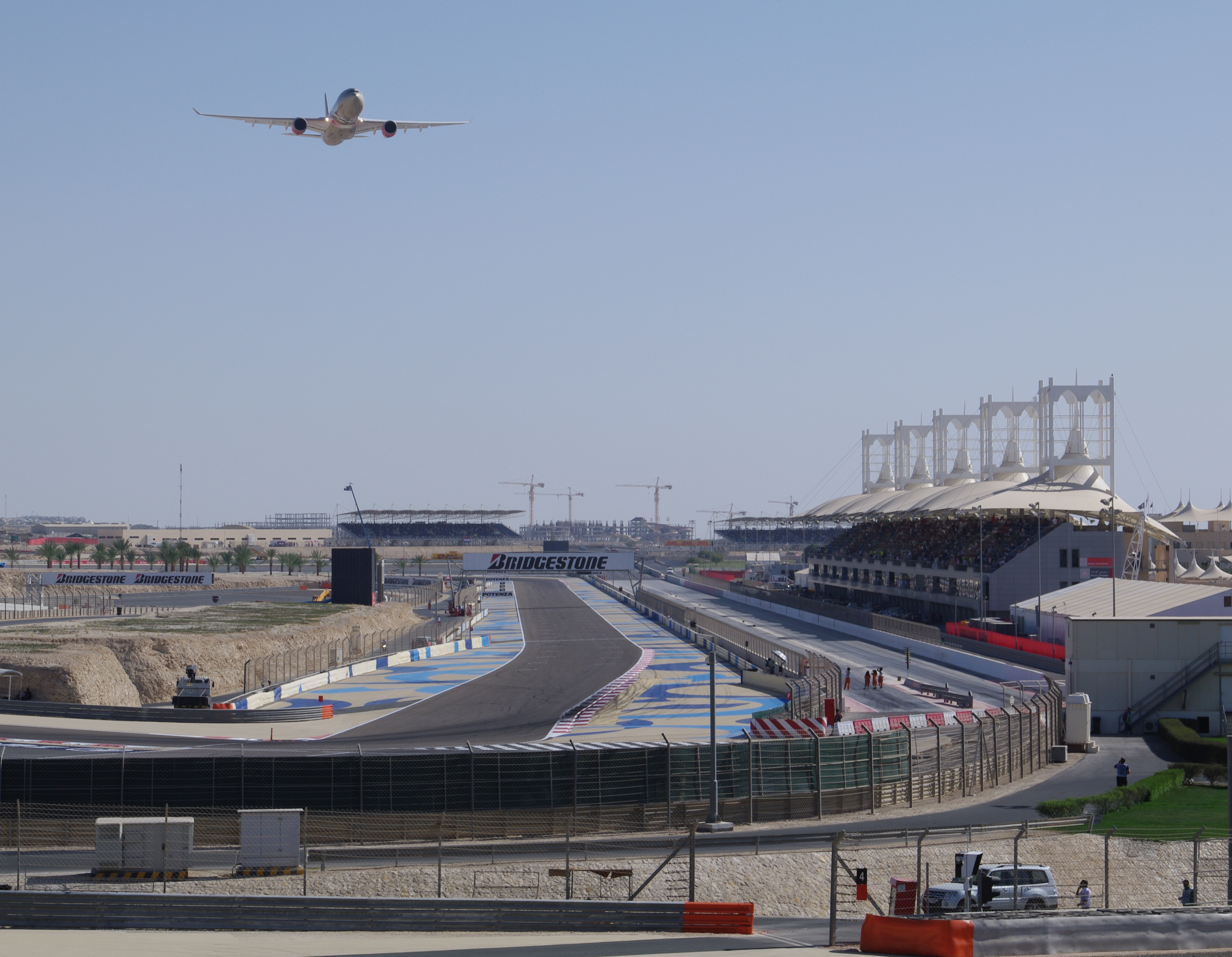
The Bahrain International Circuit in 2010

The first Bahrain Grand Prix took place on 4 April 2004, making history as the first Formula One Grand Prix to be held in the Middle East. Bahrain fought off fierce competition from elsewhere in the region to stage the race, with Egypt, Lebanon and the United Arab Emirates (UAE) all hoping for the prestige of hosting a Formula One Grand Prix (the UAE would host a Grand Prix from 2009).

The Bahrain Grand Prix is usually the third race on the Formula One calendar, apart from the 2006 season, when Bahrain swapped places with the traditional opener, the Australian Grand Prix, which was pushed back to avoid a clash with the Commonwealth Games. In 2009, Bahrain was moved to the fourth race. For the 2010 season Bahrain was again the pre-season testing and season opener and Formula One cars drove the full 6.299 km (3.914 mi) "Endurance Circuit" to celebrate F1's 'diamond jubilee'. For 2011 however F1 was set to return to racing on the original layout used between 2004 and 2009. The race was postponed and finally cancelled due to protests in the country but F1 returned to the track for the 2012 Bahrain Grand Prix. 2014 saw the track host its first ever Grand Prix under lights, as the race was scheduled as a night race to celebrate the tenth year of Formula 1 at the circuit. Subsequent editions of the race have also been held at night. In 2020 the circuit hosted two Grands Prix, the Bahrain and Sakhir Grands Prix, after the calendar was revised following the COVID-19 pandemic with the latter using the Outer Circuit layout. In 2026, the race was cancelled due to the conflicts within the Middle East.

== Series hosted ==
The Bahrain International Circuit hosts a number of high-profile series, including the FIA Formula One World Championship, the FIA World Endurance Championship, the FIA Formula 2 Championship, FIA Formula 3 Championship, and Porsche Carrera Cup Middle East.

In the past the circuit has hosted the FIA GT Championship, Speedcar Series, Australian V8 Supercars, GP2 Asia Series, and a one-off Bahrain Superprix involving Formula Three cars, following on from the collapsed Korea Super Prix. The first ever Formula BMW World Final took place in Bahrain.

=== Events ===
Current

- November: F4 Saudi Arabian Championship
- December: Ferrari Challenge Middle East

Future

- FIA Formula 2 Championship
  - Sakhir Formula 2 round (2017–2025, 2027)
- FIA Formula 3 Championship (2022–2025, 2027)
- FIA World Endurance Championship
  - 8 Hours of Bahrain (2012–2017, 2019–2025, 2027)
- Formula One
  - Bahrain Grand Prix (2004–2010, 2012–2025, 2027)

Former

- Bahrain Superprix (2004)
- Ferrari Challenge Asia-Pacific (2020)
- Ferrari Challenge Europe (2019)
- FIA GT Championship
  - Bahrain Supercar 500 (2005)
- FIA GT Nations Cup (2018)
- Formula BMW Asia (2004–2005)
- Formula BMW World Final (2005)
- Formula One
  - Sakhir Grand Prix (2020)
- Gulf 12 Hours (2021)
- GP2 Series
  - Bahrain GP2 round (2005, 2007, 2012–2015)
- GP2 Asia Series (2008–2010)
- GP3 Series (2015)
- MRF Challenge Formula 2000 Championship (2013–2019)
- Porsche Carrera Cup Middle East (2009–2010, 2012–2025)
- Porsche Supercup (2006–2010, 2012)
- Speedcar Series (2008–2009)
- TCR International Series (2016–2017)
- TCR Middle East Series (2017–2018)
- V8 Supercars
  - Desert 400 (2006–2008, 2010)
- World Series Formula V8 3.5 (2017)
- World Series of Darts
  - Bahrain Darts Masters (2023–2025)
- World Touring Car Cup
  - FIA WTCR Race of Bahrain (2022)

== Lap records ==
As of April 2026, the fastest official race lap records at the Bahrain International Circuit are listed as:

Category	Time	Driver	Vehicle	Event	Date
Grand Prix Circuit (2005–present): 5.412 km (3.363 mi)
F1	1:31.447	(Spain) Pedro de la Rosa	McLaren MP4-20	2005 Bahrain Grand Prix	3 April 2005
LMP1	1:41.511	(Brazil) Lucas di Grassi	Audi R18	2016 6 Hours of Bahrain	19 November 2016
GP2	1:43.166	(Belgium) Stoffel Vandoorne	Dallara GP2/11	2015 2nd Sakhir GP2 round	20 November 2015
FIA F2	1:43.848	(Belgium) Amaury Cordeel	Dallara F2 2018	2022 Sakhir Formula 2 round	19 March 2022
Formula V8	1:48.216	(Japan) Yu Kanamaru	Dallara T12	2017 Sakhir Formula V8 round	18 November 2017
GP3	1:48.228	(Italy) Luca Ghiotto	Dallara GP3/13	2015 Sakhir GP3 round	21 November 2015
LMP2	1:48.579	(United Kingdom) Paul di Resta	Oreca 07	2019 8 Hours of Bahrain	14 December 2019
LMH	1:48.926	(Switzerland) Sébastien Buemi	Toyota GR010 Hybrid	2021 6 Hours of Bahrain	30 October 2021
FIA F3	1:50.261	(Sweden) Dino Beganovic	Dallara F3 2019	2024 Sakhir Formula 3 round	2 March 2024
LMDh	1:51.016	(Switzerland) Neel Jani	Porsche 963	2023 8 Hours of Bahrain	4 November 2023
GT1 (GTS)	1:56.478	(United Kingdom) Jamie Davies	Maserati MC12 GT1	2005 FIA GT Bahrain Supercar 500	25 November 2005
LM GTE	1:56.942	(Spain) Miguel Molina	Ferrari 488 GTE Evo	2019 8 Hours of Bahrain	14 December 2019
MRF Challenge	2:00.349	(Netherlands) Bent Viscaal	Dallara Formulino Pro	2019 Sakhir MRF Challenge round	13 December 2019
GT3	2:00.675	(United Kingdom) Ben Barnicoat	McLaren 720S GT3	2020 Gulf 12 Hours	9 January 2021
Porsche Carrera Cup	2:01.631	(United Kingdom) Harry King	Porsche 911 (992 I) GT3 Cup	2023 1st Sakhir Porsche Sprint Challenge Middle East round	4 March 2023
GT2	2:01.821	(Germany) Mike Rockenfeller	Porsche 911 (996) GT3-RSR	2005 FIA GT Bahrain Supercar 500	25 November 2005
Ferrari Challenge	2:03.716	(Monaco) Louis Prette	Ferrari 488 Challenge	2019 Sakhir Ferrari Challenge Europe round	17 February 2019
Formula 4	2:05.437	(Morocco) Suleiman Zanfari	Tatuus F4-T421	2023 F4 Saudi Arabian Trophy	15 December 2023
Stock car racing	2:06.825	(Germany) Heinz-Harald Frentzen	Speedcar V8	2009 1st Sakhir Speedcar Series round	23 January 2009
V8 Supercars	2:06.9097	(New Zealand) Shane van Gisbergen	Ford FG Falcon	2010 Desert 400	27 February 2010
Formula BMW	2:09.405	(Bahrain) Salman Al Khalifa	Mygale FB02	2005 Sakhir Formula BMW Asia round	3 April 2005
TCR Touring Car	2:11.155	(Hungary) Norbert Michelisz	Hyundai Elantra N TCR	2022 WTCR Race of Bahrain	11 November 2022
GT4	2:11.675	(Saudi Arabia) Khaled Alahmadi	Porsche 718 Cayman GT4 Clubsport	2022 1st Sakhir Porsche Sprint Challenge Middle East round	19 March 2022
Outer Circuit (2005–present): 3.543 km (2.202 mi)
F1	0:55.404	(United Kingdom) George Russell	Mercedes-AMG F1 W11 EQ Performance	2020 Sakhir Grand Prix	6 December 2020
FIA F2	1:04.087	(Germany) Mick Schumacher	Dallara F2 2018	2020 2nd Sakhir Formula 2 round	5 December 2020
Porsche Carrera Cup	1:14.335	(Turkey) Ayhancan Güven	Porsche 911 (991 II) GT3 Cup	2020 3rd Sakhir Porsche Sprint Challenge Middle East round	5 December 2020
GT4	1:21.229	(Austria) Leo Willert	Porsche 718 Cayman GT4 Clubsport	2020 3rd Sakhir Porsche Sprint Challenge Middle East round	5 December 2020
Endurance Circuit (2005–present): 6.299 km (3.914 mi)
F1	1:58.287	(Spain) Fernando Alonso	Ferrari F10	2010 Bahrain Grand Prix	14 March 2010
GP2	2:09.787	(France) Jules Bianchi	Dallara GP2/05	2010 2nd Sakhir GP2 Asia round	13 March 2010
Porsche Carrera Cup	2:32.658	(Austria) Norbert Siedler	Porsche 911 (997 II) GT3 Cup	2010 1st Sakhir Porsche Supercup round	13 March 2010
Paddock Circuit (2004–present): 3.823 km (2.376 mi)
V8 Supercars	1:24.9102	(Australia) Jason Bright	Ford BA Falcon	2006 Desert 400	24 November 2006
Porsche Carrera Cup	1:26.0140	(Hong Kong) Darryl O'Young	Porsche 911 (997 I) GT3 Cup	2008 Sakhir Porsche Carrera Cup Asia round	8 November 2008
Formula BMW	1:26.997	(Germany) Nico Hülkenberg	Mygale FB02	2005 Formula BMW World Final	16 December 2005
Oasis Circuit (2004–present): 2.550 km (1.584 mi)
Porsche Carrera Cup	1:03.819	(United Arab Emirates) Bashar Mardini	Porsche 911 (991 I) GT3 Cup	2017 1st Sakhir Porsche Sprint Challenge Middle East round	10 March 2017
Superbike	1:05.600	(Qatar) Saeed Al Sulaiti	BMW M1000RR	2026 2nd Sakhir Bahrain Motorcycle Championship round	24 April 2026
Supersport	1:08.553	(Spain) Marcos Ludeña	Yamaha YZF-R6	2026 1st Sakhir Bahrain Motorcycle Championship round	6 February 2026
TCR Touring Car	1:09.824	(United Kingdom) Josh Files	Honda Civic Type R TCR (FK2)	2017 Sakhir TCR Middle East round	11 March 2017
Grand Prix Circuit (2004): 5.417 km (3.366 mi)
F1	1:30.252	(Germany) Michael Schumacher	Ferrari F2004	2004 Bahrain Grand Prix	4 April 2004
F3	1:54.048	(United Kingdom) Jamie Green	Dallara F304	2004 Bahrain Superprix	10 December 2004
Formula BMW	2:10.784	(Hong Kong) Marchy Lee	Mygale FB02	2004 Sakhir Formula BMW Asia round	3 April 2004

== See also ==
- List of Formula One circuits
