= Al Faisal Al Zubair =

Omani racing driver (born 1998)

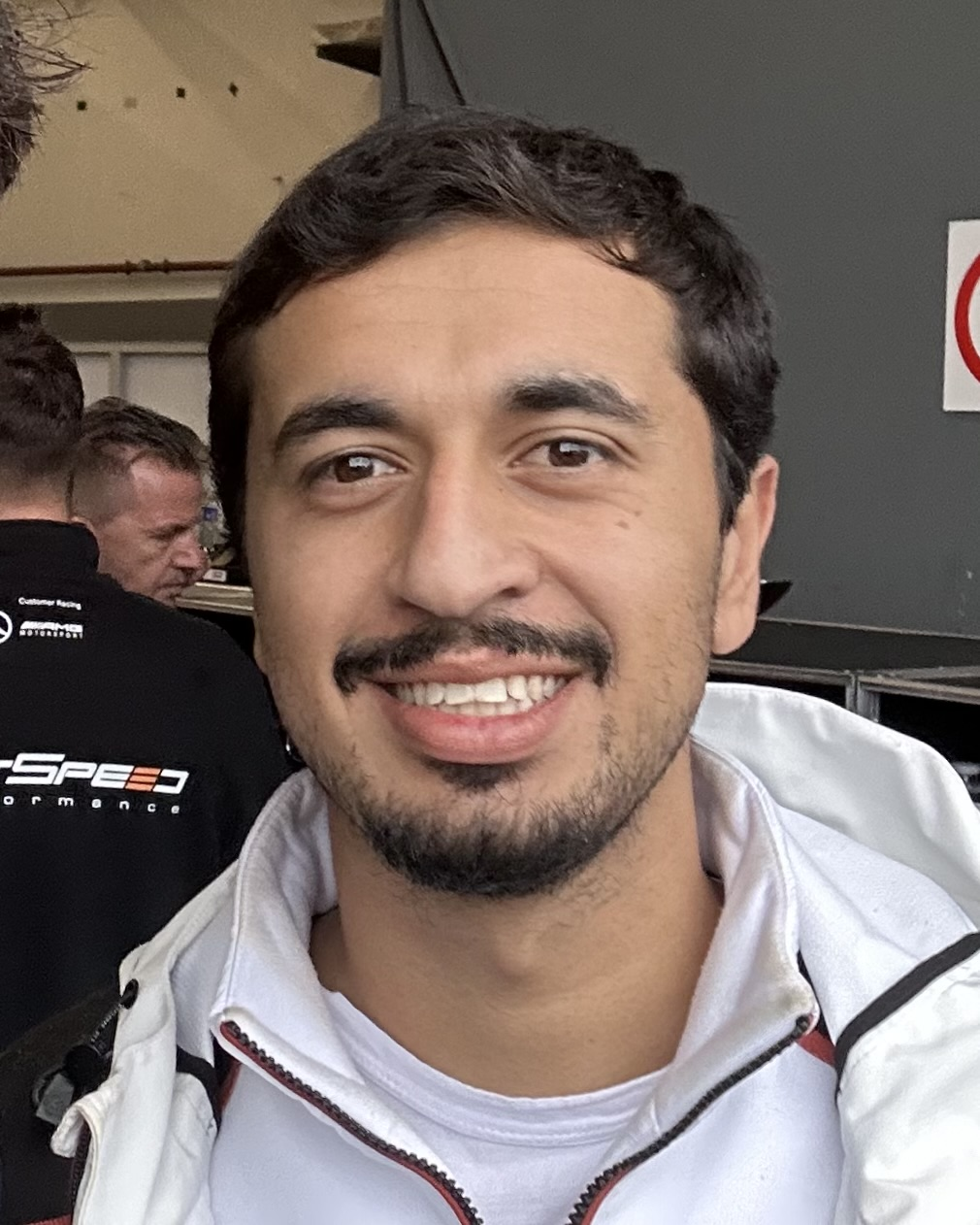
- Al Zubair in 2024
- Nationality: Oman
- Born: 17 April 1998 (age 28) Muscat, Oman

GT3 Series career
- Debut season: 2016
- Current team: Walter Lechner Racing
- Categorisation: FIA Silver
- Car number: 7
- Starts: 59
- Wins: 13
- Poles: 12
- Fastest laps: 16
- Best finish: 1st in 2019

Previous series
- 2018-19 2018 2018 2017-18 2017 2017 2016-17 2016 2015 2015 2014-15: Porsche GT3 Cup Challenge ME; Porsche Mobil 1 Supercup; Porsche Carrera Cup Germany; Porsche GT3 Cup Challenge ME; Porsche Mobil 1 Supercup; Porsche Carrera Cup Germany; Porsche GT3 Cup Challenge ME; BRDC British Formula 3 BRDC Formula 4 Duo BRDC Formula 4 Autumn Trophy; Formula Gulf 1000

Championship titles
- 2017–2018: Porsche GT3 Cup Challenge Middle East

Awards
- 2018-2019

Al Faisal Al Zubair (born 17 April 1998) is a racing driver from Oman.

== Career ==
In 2015, Al-Zubair competed in the international field of the BRDC British Formula 4 racing, where he collected one podium finish and was placed fourth overall in the Autumn Trophy.

Al Zubair graduated to the BRDC British Formula 3 Championship with Fortec Motorsports in 2016. He then embarked upon a winter racing programme in 2016-2017 Porsche GT3 Cup Challenge Middle East for the first time. He finished fifth in the overall standings and clinched Rookie and Silver category victories.

At the start of 2017, Al Zubair teamed up with Walter Lechner Racing to take part in the Porsche Mobil 1 Super Cup that runs in conjunction with the FIA Formula One World Championship. He became champion in the 2017-2018 Porsche Cup Challenge Middle East in only his second season in the series.

In 2018-2019, Al-Zubair successfully defended his championship by winning the Porsche BWT GT3 Cup Challenge Middle East series, the first racing driver to win consecutive championships in its 10-year history.

== Racing record ==
=== Career summary ===
Season	Series	Team	Races	Wins	Poles	FLaps	Podiums	Points	Position
2015	BRDC Formula 4 Championship	Hillspeed	18	0	0	0	1	189	16th
2015	BRDC Formula 4 Autumn Trophy	Fortec Motorsport	8	0	0	0	1	157	4th
2016	BRDC British Formula 3 Championship	Fortec Motorsport	23	0	0	0	0	196	12th
2016–17	Porsche GT3 Cup Challenge Middle East	Lechner Racing	12	1	1	1	3	192	5th
2017	Porsche Supercup	Lechner Racing Middle East	11	0	0	0	0	29	14th
2017	Porsche Carrera Cup Germany	Zele Racing	4	0	0	0	0	18	21st
2017–18	Porsche GT3 Cup Challenge Middle East	Frijns Structural Steel ME	12	4	4	5	10	232	**1st**
2018	Porsche Supercup	Lechner Racing Middle East	8	0	0	0	0	15	16th
2018	Porsche Carrera Cup Germany	Lechner Racing Middle East	2	0	0	0	0	0	NC†
2018	Porsche Carrera Cup Germany	Lechner Racing	2	0	0	0	0	0	NC†
2018–19	Porsche GT3 Cup Challenge Middle East	Team Oman	16	8	7	10	13	363	**1st**
2019	Porsche Supercup	Lechner Racing Middle East	10	0	0	0	0	52	12th
2019	24H Middle East Series - SPX	Speed Lover	1	0	0	0	1	0	NC†
2020	24H GT Series - GT3	HTP Winward Motorsport	1	0	0	0	0	14	11th
2020	British GT Championship	2 Seas Motorsport	1	0	0	0	0	0	NC†
2021	International GT Open	Lechner Racing	12	4	0	0	8	110	**3rd**
2022	24H GT Series - GT3	Al Manar Racing by HRT	1	0	0	0	0	0	NC†
2022	GT World Challenge Europe Endurance Cup	Al Manar Racing by HRT	5	0	0	0	0	6	31st
2022	Intercontinental GT Challenge	Al Manar Racing by HRT	1	0	0	0	0	12	16th
2022	Intercontinental GT Challenge	Al Manar Racing by GetSpeed	1	0	0	0	0	12	16th
2022	International GT Open	GetSpeed Performance	2	1	0	0	1	0	NC†
2022–23	Middle East Trophy - GT3	Al Manar Racing by HRT	1	0	0	0	0	0	NC†
2023	Asian Le Mans Series - GT	Haupt Racing Team	4	2	0	0	3	71	**2nd**
2023	International GT Open	Al Manar Racing by GetSpeed	6	2	0	1	5	62	8th
2023–24	Asian Le Mans Series - GT	Al Manar Racing by GetSpeed	5	0	0	0	1	50	5th
2023–24	Middle East Trophy - GT3	GetSpeed Performance	1	0	0	0	0	0	NC†
2024	GT World Challenge Europe Endurance Cup	Al Manar Racing by GetSpeed	5	0	0	0	0	6	26th
2024	GT World Challenge Europe Endurance Cup - Gold	Al Manar Racing by GetSpeed	5	1	1	0	4	104	**2nd**
2024	International GT Open	Al Manar Racing by GetSpeed	3	2	0	0	2	53	11th
2025	Middle East Trophy - GT3	Al Manar Racing by Team WRT	1	1	0	0	1	0	NC†
2025	GT World Challenge Europe Endurance Cup	AlManar Racing by WRT	5	0	0	0	1	31	10th
2025	GT World Challenge Europe Endurance Cup - Gold	AlManar Racing by WRT	4	2	0	0	3	90*	**2nd***
2025	GT World Challenge Europe Sprint Cup	AlManar Racing by WRT	10	0	0	0	0	3.5	24th
2025	GT World Challenge Europe Sprint Cup – Gold	AlManar Racing by WRT	10	1	0	0	5	88	4th
2025	Intercontinental GT Challenge	AlManar Racing by WRT	2	0	0	0	1	15	23rd
2025	Gulf 12 Hours	AlManar by Dragon Racing	1	0	0	0	1	N/A	**2nd**
2025–26	24H Series Middle East - GT3	AlManar Racing by Dragon							
2026	International GT Open	Al Manar by Dragon Racing	5	0	0	0	1	29	14th

† Not eligible for points.

=== Complete GT World Challenge Europe results ===
==== GT World Challenge Europe Endurance Cup ====
(Races in bold indicate pole position) (Races in italics indicate fastest lap)

Year	Team	Car	Class	1	2	3	4	5	6	7	Pos.	Points
2022	Al Manar Racing by HRT	Mercedes-AMG GT3 Evo	Silver	IMO; 22	LEC; 7	SPA; 6H; Ret	SPA; 12H; Ret	**SPA**; **24H**; Ret	HOC; 13	CAT; 15	4th	66
2024	AlManar Racing by GetSpeed	Mercedes-AMG GT3 Evo	Gold	**LEC**; 15	SPA; 6H; 30	SPA; 12H; 23	SPA; 24H; 7	NÜR; 17	MNZ; Ret	JED; 20	2nd	104
2025	AlManar Racing by WRT	BMW M4 GT3 Evo	Gold	LEC; 10	MNZ; 4	SPA; 6H; 17	SPA; 12H; 21	SPA; 24H; 20	NÜR; 12	CAT; 2	2nd	108

==== GT World Challenge Europe Sprint Cup ====
(Races in bold indicate pole position) (Races in italics indicate fastest lap)

Year	Team	Car	Class	1	2	3	4	5	6	7	8	9	10	Pos.	Points
2025	AlManar Racing by WRT	BMW M4 GT3 Evo	Gold	BRH; 1; 19	BRH; 2; 8	ZAN; 1; 12	ZAN; 2; 18	MIS; 1 Ret	MIS; 2; 20	MAG; 1; 13	MAG; 2; 17	VAL; 1; 9	VAL; 2; 10	4th	88
