= 2024 GT World Challenge Europe Endurance Cup =

Motorsports event

The 2024 Fanatec GT World Challenge Europe Endurance Cup was the fourteenth season of the GT World Challenge Europe Endurance Cup since its inception in 2011 as the Blancpain Endurance Series. The season began on 7 April at Circuit Paul Ricard and ended on 30 November at Jeddah Corniche Circuit.

== Calendar ==
The provisional calendar was released on July 1, 2023, at the SRO's annual 24 Hours of Spa press conference, featuring five rounds.

Round	Race	Circuit	Date	Map	
1	3 Hours of Paul Ricard	Circuit Paul Ricard, Le Castellet, France	6–7 April	2024 GT World Challenge Europe Endurance Cup is located in Europe	2024 GT World Challenge Europe Endurance Cup is located in Saudi Arabia
2	CrowdStrike 24 Hours of Spa	Circuit de Spa-Francorchamps, Stavelot, Belgium	29–30 June	2024 GT World Challenge Europe Endurance Cup is located in Europe	2024 GT World Challenge Europe Endurance Cup is located in Saudi Arabia
3	3 Hours of Nürburgring	Nürburgring, Nürburg, Germany	27–28 July	2024 GT World Challenge Europe Endurance Cup is located in Europe	2024 GT World Challenge Europe Endurance Cup is located in Saudi Arabia
4	3 Hours of Monza	Autodromo Nazionale Monza, Monza, Italy	21–22 September	2024 GT World Challenge Europe Endurance Cup is located in Europe	2024 GT World Challenge Europe Endurance Cup is located in Saudi Arabia
5	6 Hours of Jeddah	Jeddah Corniche Circuit, Jeddah, Saudi Arabia	29–30 November	2024 GT World Challenge Europe Endurance Cup is located in Europe	2024 GT World Challenge Europe Endurance Cup is located in Saudi Arabia

== Entry list ==
Team	Car	No.	Drivers	Class	Rounds
(Germany) Mercedes-AMG Team GetSpeed	Mercedes-AMG GT3 Evo	2	(Andorra) Jules Gounon	P	All
(Germany) Mercedes-AMG Team GetSpeed	Mercedes-AMG GT3 Evo	2	(Germany) Fabian Schiller	P	All
(Germany) Mercedes-AMG Team GetSpeed	Mercedes-AMG GT3 Evo	2	(Germany) Luca Stolz	P	All
(Germany) GetSpeed	Mercedes-AMG GT3 Evo	3	(United States) Anthony Bartone	S	All
(Germany) GetSpeed	Mercedes-AMG GT3 Evo	3	(United Kingdom) James Kell	S	All
(Germany) GetSpeed	Mercedes-AMG GT3 Evo	3	(Switzerland) Yannick Mettler	S	All
(Germany) GetSpeed	Mercedes-AMG GT3 Evo	3	(United Kingdom) Aaron Walker	S	2
(Oman) AlManar Racing by GetSpeed	Mercedes-AMG GT3 Evo	777	(Oman) Al Faisal Al Zubair	G	All
(Oman) AlManar Racing by GetSpeed	Mercedes-AMG GT3 Evo	777	(Austria) Dominik Baumann	G	All
(Oman) AlManar Racing by GetSpeed	Mercedes-AMG GT3 Evo	777	(Canada) Mikaël Grenier	G	1–3, 5
(Oman) AlManar Racing by GetSpeed	Mercedes-AMG GT3 Evo	777	(Switzerland) Philip Ellis	G	2
(Oman) AlManar Racing by GetSpeed	Mercedes-AMG GT3 Evo	777	(Australia) Broc Feeney	G	4
(United States) CrowdStrike by Riley	Mercedes-AMG GT3 Evo	4	(United States) Colin Braun	PA	2
(United States) CrowdStrike by Riley	Mercedes-AMG GT3 Evo	4	(Netherlands) Nicky Catsburg	PA	2
(United States) CrowdStrike by Riley	Mercedes-AMG GT3 Evo	4	(United Kingdom) Ian James	PA	2
(United States) CrowdStrike by Riley	Mercedes-AMG GT3 Evo	4	(United States) George Kurtz	PA	2
(United Kingdom) Optimum Motorsport	McLaren 720S GT3 Evo	5	(United Kingdom) Shaun Balfe	B	2
(United Kingdom) Optimum Motorsport	McLaren 720S GT3 Evo	5	(United Kingdom) Ben Barnicoat	B	2
(United Kingdom) Optimum Motorsport	McLaren 720S GT3 Evo	5	(United Kingdom) Sam Neary	B	2
(United Kingdom) Optimum Motorsport	McLaren 720S GT3 Evo	5	(Netherlands) Ruben del Sarte	B	2
(United Kingdom) Optimum Motorsport	McLaren 720S GT3 Evo	27	(United Kingdom) Rob Bell	B	1–2, 4
(United Kingdom) Optimum Motorsport	McLaren 720S GT3 Evo	27	(United Kingdom) Mark Radcliffe	B	1–2, 4
(United Kingdom) Optimum Motorsport	McLaren 720S GT3 Evo	27	(United Kingdom) Ollie Millroy	B	1–2
(United Kingdom) Optimum Motorsport	McLaren 720S GT3 Evo	27	(Spain) Fran Rueda	B	2, 4
(Belgium) Comtoyou Racing	Aston Martin Vantage AMR GT3 Evo	7	(Italy) Mattia Drudi	P	All
(Belgium) Comtoyou Racing	Aston Martin Vantage AMR GT3 Evo	7	(Denmark) Marco Sørensen	P	All
(Belgium) Comtoyou Racing	Aston Martin Vantage AMR GT3 Evo	7	(Denmark) Nicki Thiim	P	All
(Belgium) Comtoyou Racing	Aston Martin Vantage AMR GT3 Evo	11	(Belgium) John de Wilde	B	1–4
(Belgium) Comtoyou Racing	Aston Martin Vantage AMR GT3 Evo	11	(Belgium) Kobe Pauwels	B	1–3
(Belgium) Comtoyou Racing	Aston Martin Vantage AMR GT3 Evo	11	(Netherlands) Job van Uitert	B	1–3
(Belgium) Comtoyou Racing	Aston Martin Vantage AMR GT3 Evo	11	(Netherlands) Dante Rappange	B	2
(Belgium) Comtoyou Racing	Aston Martin Vantage AMR GT3 Evo	11	(United Kingdom) James Jakes	B	4
(Belgium) Comtoyou Racing	Aston Martin Vantage AMR GT3 Evo	11	(Netherlands) Niels Koolen	B	4
(Belgium) Comtoyou Racing	Aston Martin Vantage AMR GT3 Evo	12	(Belgium) Nicolas Baert	S	All
(Belgium) Comtoyou Racing	Aston Martin Vantage AMR GT3 Evo	12	(Denmark) Sebastian Øgaard	S	All
(Belgium) Comtoyou Racing	Aston Martin Vantage AMR GT3 Evo	12	(Belgium) Esteban Muth	S	1–3
(Belgium) Comtoyou Racing	Aston Martin Vantage AMR GT3 Evo	12	(France) Erwan Bastard	S	2
(Belgium) Comtoyou Racing	Aston Martin Vantage AMR GT3 Evo	12	(Belgium) Kobe Pauwels	S	4
(Belgium) Comtoyou Racing	Aston Martin Vantage AMR GT3 Evo	12	(Belgium) Matisse Lismont	S	5
(Belgium) Comtoyou Racing	Aston Martin Vantage AMR GT3 Evo	21	(United Kingdom) Charles Clark	S	1–3
(Belgium) Comtoyou Racing	Aston Martin Vantage AMR GT3 Evo	21	(Belgium) Sam Dejonghe	S	1–3
(Belgium) Comtoyou Racing	Aston Martin Vantage AMR GT3 Evo	21	(Belgium) Matisse Lismont	S	1–3
(Belgium) Comtoyou Racing	Aston Martin Vantage AMR GT3 Evo	21	(Netherlands) Xavier Maassen	S	2
(Belgium) Comtoyou Racing	Aston Martin Vantage AMR GT3 Evo	21	(Netherlands) Job van Uitert	G	4–5
(Belgium) Comtoyou Racing	Aston Martin Vantage AMR GT3 Evo	21	(United Kingdom) Charles Clark	G	4
(Belgium) Comtoyou Racing	Aston Martin Vantage AMR GT3 Evo	21	(Belgium) Matisse Lismont	G	4
(Belgium) Comtoyou Racing	Aston Martin Vantage AMR GT3 Evo	21	(United Kingdom) James Jakes	G	5
(Belgium) Comtoyou Racing	Aston Martin Vantage AMR GT3 Evo	21	(Netherlands) Niels Koolen	G	5
(Switzerland) Kessel Racing	Ferrari 296 GT3	8	(Italy) David Fumanelli	B	1–2, 4–5
(Switzerland) Kessel Racing	Ferrari 296 GT3	8	(Switzerland) Nicolò Rosi	B	1–2, 4–5
(Switzerland) Kessel Racing	Ferrari 296 GT3	8	(Italy) Niccolò Schirò	B	1–2, 4–5
(Switzerland) Kessel Racing	Ferrari 296 GT3	8	(Italy) Daniele Di Amato	B	2
(Switzerland) Kessel Racing	Ferrari 296 GT3	74	(United Kingdom) Ben Tuck	B	1–2, 4
(Switzerland) Kessel Racing	Ferrari 296 GT3	74	(United Kingdom) Matt Bell	B	1–2
(Switzerland) Kessel Racing	Ferrari 296 GT3	74	(United Kingdom) John Hartshorne	B	1–2
(Switzerland) Kessel Racing	Ferrari 296 GT3	74	(United States) Chandler Hull	B	2
(Switzerland) Kessel Racing	Ferrari 296 GT3	74	(Switzerland) Alex Fontana	B	4
(Switzerland) Kessel Racing	Ferrari 296 GT3	74	(United States) "Hash"	B	4
(Belgium) Boutsen VDS	Mercedes-AMG GT3 Evo	9	(France) Thomas Drouet	P	All
(Belgium) Boutsen VDS	Mercedes-AMG GT3 Evo	9	(Germany) Maximilian Götz	P	All
(Belgium) Boutsen VDS	Mercedes-AMG GT3 Evo	9	(United Kingdom) Adam Christodoulou	P	1
(Belgium) Boutsen VDS	Mercedes-AMG GT3 Evo	9	(Belgium) Ulysse de Pauw	P	2
(Belgium) Boutsen VDS	Mercedes-AMG GT3 Evo	9	(Switzerland) Philip Ellis	P	3
(Belgium) Boutsen VDS	Mercedes-AMG GT3 Evo	9	(Brazil) Sérgio Sette Câmara	P	4
(Belgium) Boutsen VDS	Mercedes-AMG GT3 Evo	9	(Estonia) Ralf Aron	P	5
(Belgium) Boutsen VDS	Mercedes-AMG GT3 Evo	10	(France) César Gazeau	S	All
(Belgium) Boutsen VDS	Mercedes-AMG GT3 Evo	10	(France) Aurélien Panis	S	All
(Belgium) Boutsen VDS	Mercedes-AMG GT3 Evo	10	(United States) Roee Meyuhas	S	1–4
(Belgium) Boutsen VDS	Mercedes-AMG GT3 Evo	10	(France) Sébastien Baud	S	2
(Belgium) Boutsen VDS	Mercedes-AMG GT3 Evo	10	(Belgium) Esteban Muth	S	5
(Germany) Lionspeed GP	Porsche 911 GT3 R (992)	13	(Denmark) Bastian Buus	B	1
(Germany) Lionspeed GP	Porsche 911 GT3 R (992)	13	(Germany) Patrick Kolb	B	1
(Germany) Lionspeed GP	Porsche 911 GT3 R (992)	13	(Germany) Florian Spengler	B	1
(Germany) Lionspeed GP	Porsche 911 GT3 R (992)	80	(Denmark) Bastian Buus	B	3–5
(Germany) Lionspeed GP	Porsche 911 GT3 R (992)	80	(Germany) Patrick Kolb	B	3–5
(Germany) Lionspeed GP	Porsche 911 GT3 R (992)	80	(Netherlands) Michael Verhagen	B	3–5
(Germany) Lionspeed x Herberth	Porsche 911 GT3 R (992)	80	(Hong Kong) Antares Au	B	2
(Germany) Lionspeed x Herberth	Porsche 911 GT3 R (992)	80	(Switzerland) Alexander Fach	B	2
(Germany) Lionspeed x Herberth	Porsche 911 GT3 R (992)	80	(Belgium) Alessio Picariello	B	2
(Germany) Lionspeed x Herberth	Porsche 911 GT3 R (992)	80	(Estonia) Martin Rump	B	2
(Germany) Herberth Motorsport	Porsche 911 GT3 R (992)	91	(Germany) Ralf Bohn	B	All
(Germany) Herberth Motorsport	Porsche 911 GT3 R (992)	91	(Germany) Robert Renauer	B	All
(Germany) Herberth Motorsport	Porsche 911 GT3 R (992)	91	(Netherlands) Morris Schuring	B	All
(Germany) Herberth Motorsport	Porsche 911 GT3 R (992)	91	(Germany) Alfred Renauer	B	2
(Germany) SSR Herberth	Porsche 911 GT3 R (992)	92	(Australia) Matt Campbell	P	2
(Germany) SSR Herberth	Porsche 911 GT3 R (992)	92	(France) Mathieu Jaminet	P	2
(Germany) SSR Herberth	Porsche 911 GT3 R (992)	92	(France) Frédéric Makowiecki	P	2
(Lithuania) Pure Rxcing	Porsche 911 GT3 R (992)	911	(Austria) Klaus Bachler	P	All
(Lithuania) Pure Rxcing	Porsche 911 GT3 R (992)	911	(United Kingdom) Alex Malykhin (Note: Malykhin is Belarusian, but he competes under a British licence as Belarusian national emblems were banned by the FIA following the Russian invasion of Ukraine.)	P	All
(Lithuania) Pure Rxcing	Porsche 911 GT3 R (992)	911	(Germany) Joel Sturm	P	All
(Italy) BMW Italia Ceccato Racing	BMW M4 GT3	15	(Italy) Marco Cassarà	B	4
(Italy) BMW Italia Ceccato Racing	BMW M4 GT3	15	(United States) Phillippe Denes	B	4
(Italy) BMW Italia Ceccato Racing	BMW M4 GT3	15	(Italy) Felice Jelmini	B	4
(China) Uno Racing Team with Landgraf	Mercedes-AMG GT3 Evo	16	(Netherlands) Indy Dontje	PA	2
(China) Uno Racing Team with Landgraf	Mercedes-AMG GT3 Evo	16	(Hong Kong) David Pun	PA	2
(China) Uno Racing Team with Landgraf	Mercedes-AMG GT3 Evo	16	(Hong Kong) "Rio"	PA	2
(China) Uno Racing Team with Landgraf	Mercedes-AMG GT3 Evo	16	(Macau) Kevin Tse	PA	2
(Austria) GRT Grasser Racing Team	Lamborghini Huracán GT3 Evo 2	19	(Italy) Mateo Llarena	S	All
(Austria) GRT Grasser Racing Team	Lamborghini Huracán GT3 Evo 2	19	(Kuwait) Haytham Qarajouli	S	1–3
(Austria) GRT Grasser Racing Team	Lamborghini Huracán GT3 Evo 2	19	(United Kingdom) Hugo Cook	S	1–2
(Austria) GRT Grasser Racing Team	Lamborghini Huracán GT3 Evo 2	19	(Belgium) Baptiste Moulin	S	2, 4
(Austria) GRT Grasser Racing Team	Lamborghini Huracán GT3 Evo 2	19	(France) Loris Cabirou	S	3, 5
(Austria) GRT Grasser Racing Team	Lamborghini Huracán GT3 Evo 2	19	(Israel) Artem Petrov (Note: Mukovoz is Russian, but he competes as a neutral competitor as Russian national emblems were banned by the FIA following the Russian invasion of Ukraine. Nesov and Petrov, also Russians, compete under a Kyrgyz and an Israeli licence respectively for the same reason.)	S	4
(Austria) GRT Grasser Racing Team	Lamborghini Huracán GT3 Evo 2	19	(Spain) Isaac Tutumlu	S	5
(Austria) GRT Grasser Racing Team	Lamborghini Huracán GT3 Evo 2	163	(Italy) Marco Mapelli	P	All
(Austria) GRT Grasser Racing Team	Lamborghini Huracán GT3 Evo 2	163	(France) Franck Perera	P	All
(Austria) GRT Grasser Racing Team	Lamborghini Huracán GT3 Evo 2	163	(Germany) Christian Engelhart	P	1
(Austria) GRT Grasser Racing Team	Lamborghini Huracán GT3 Evo 2	163	(South Africa) Jordan Pepper	P	2–5
(France) Schumacher CLRT	Porsche 911 GT3 R (992)	22	(France) Dorian Boccolacci	P	All
(France) Schumacher CLRT	Porsche 911 GT3 R (992)	22	(Turkey) Ayhancan Güven	P	All
(France) Schumacher CLRT	Porsche 911 GT3 R (992)	22	(Germany) Laurin Heinrich	P	1–3, 5
(France) Schumacher CLRT	Porsche 911 GT3 R (992)	22	(France) Kévin Estre	P	4
(China) Phantom Global Racing	Porsche 911 GT3 R (992)	23	(Sweden) Joel Eriksson	P	2
(China) Phantom Global Racing	Porsche 911 GT3 R (992)	23	(New Zealand) Jaxon Evans	P	2
(China) Phantom Global Racing	Porsche 911 GT3 R (992)	23	(Austria) Thomas Preining	P	2
(France) Saintéloc Racing	Audi R8 LMS Evo II	25	(France) Paul Evrard	G	All
(France) Saintéloc Racing	Audi R8 LMS Evo II	25	(Belgium) Gilles Magnus	G	All
(France) Saintéloc Racing	Audi R8 LMS Evo II	25	(France) Jim Pla	G	All
(France) Saintéloc Racing	Audi R8 LMS Evo II	25	(Belgium) Ugo de Wilde	G	2
(France) Saintéloc Racing	Audi R8 LMS Evo II	26	(Ukraine) Ivan Klymenko	S	1–2, 4
(France) Saintéloc Racing	Audi R8 LMS Evo II	26	(France) Alban Varutti	S	1–2, 4
(France) Saintéloc Racing	Audi R8 LMS Evo II	26	(Belgium) Ugo de Wilde	S	1
(France) Saintéloc Racing	Audi R8 LMS Evo II	26	(Norway) Marcus Påverud	S	2
(France) Saintéloc Racing	Audi R8 LMS Evo II	26	(Belgium) Gilles Stadsbader	S	2
(France) Saintéloc Racing	Audi R8 LMS Evo II	26	(Argentina) Ezequiel Pérez Companc	S	4–5
(France) Saintéloc Racing	Audi R8 LMS Evo II	26	(Switzerland) Lucas Légeret	S	5
(France) Saintéloc Racing	Audi R8 LMS Evo II	26	(Belgium) Kobe Pauwels	S	5
(France) Saintéloc Racing	Audi R8 LMS Evo II	26	(France) Michael Blanchemain	B	3
(France) Saintéloc Racing	Audi R8 LMS Evo II	26	(France) Alban Varutti	B	3
(France) Saintéloc Racing	Audi R8 LMS Evo II	26	(Belgium) Ugo de Wilde	B	3
(Antigua and Barbuda) HAAS RT	Audi R8 LMS Evo II	28	(France) Simon Gachet	P	2
(Antigua and Barbuda) HAAS RT	Audi R8 LMS Evo II	28	(Belgium) Jan Heylen	P	2
(Antigua and Barbuda) HAAS RT	Audi R8 LMS Evo II	28	(Denmark) Dennis Lind	P	2
(Antigua and Barbuda) HAAS RT	Audi R8 LMS Evo II	38	(Lithuania) Julius Adomavičius	PA	2
(Antigua and Barbuda) HAAS RT	Audi R8 LMS Evo II	38	(Belgium) Olivier Bertels	PA	2
(Antigua and Barbuda) HAAS RT	Audi R8 LMS Evo II	38	(Belgium) Armand Fumal	PA	2
(Antigua and Barbuda) HAAS RT	Audi R8 LMS Evo II	38	(Australia) Brad Schumacher	PA	2
OQ by Oman Racing	BMW M4 GT3	30	(Oman) Ahmad Al Harthy	B	All
OQ by Oman Racing	BMW M4 GT3	30	(United Kingdom) Sam De Haan	B	All
OQ by Oman Racing	BMW M4 GT3	30	(Germany) Jens Klingmann	B	All
OQ by Oman Racing	BMW M4 GT3	30	(Australia) Calan Williams	B	2
(Belgium) Team WRT	BMW M4 GT3	32	(South Africa) Sheldon van der Linde	P	All
(Belgium) Team WRT	BMW M4 GT3	32	(Belgium) Dries Vanthoor	P	All
(Belgium) Team WRT	BMW M4 GT3	32	(Belgium) Charles Weerts	P	All
(Belgium) Team WRT	BMW M4 GT3	46	(Switzerland) Raffaele Marciello	P	All
(Belgium) Team WRT	BMW M4 GT3	46	(Belgium) Maxime Martin	P	All
(Belgium) Team WRT	BMW M4 GT3	46	(Italy) Valentino Rossi	P	All
(Germany) Tresor Attempto Racing	Audi R8 LMS Evo II	33	(Italy) Andrea Cola	S	5
(Germany) Tresor Attempto Racing	Audi R8 LMS Evo II	33	(Italy) Pietro Delli Guanti	S	5
(Germany) Tresor Attempto Racing	Audi R8 LMS Evo II	33	(Italy) Rocco Mazzola	S	5
(Germany) Tresor Attempto Racing	Audi R8 LMS Evo II	66	(Austria) Max Hofer	B	All
(Germany) Tresor Attempto Racing	Audi R8 LMS Evo II	66	Andrey Mukovoz	B	All
(Germany) Tresor Attempto Racing	Audi R8 LMS Evo II	66	(Luxembourg) Dylan Pereira	B	1–3, 5
(Germany) Tresor Attempto Racing	Audi R8 LMS Evo II	66	(Kyrgyzstan) Alexey Nesov	B	2
(Germany) Tresor Attempto Racing	Audi R8 LMS Evo II	88	(Italy) Lorenzo Ferrari	G	All
(Germany) Tresor Attempto Racing	Audi R8 LMS Evo II	88	(Italy) Leonardo Moncini	G	All
(Germany) Tresor Attempto Racing	Audi R8 LMS Evo II	88	(Italy) Lorenzo Patrese	G	All
(Germany) Tresor Attempto Racing	Audi R8 LMS Evo II	88	(Netherlands) Glenn van Berlo	G	2
(Germany) Tresor Attempto Racing	Audi R8 LMS Evo II	99	(Germany) Alex Aka	P	All
(Germany) Tresor Attempto Racing	Audi R8 LMS Evo II	99	(Switzerland) Ricardo Feller	P	All
(Germany) Tresor Attempto Racing	Audi R8 LMS Evo II	99	(Germany) Christopher Haase	P	All
(Germany) Walkenhorst Racing	Aston Martin Vantage AMR GT3 Evo	34	(Portugal) Henrique Chaves	P	All
(Germany) Walkenhorst Racing	Aston Martin Vantage AMR GT3 Evo	34	(United Kingdom) David Pittard	P	All
(Germany) Walkenhorst Racing	Aston Martin Vantage AMR GT3 Evo	34	(United Kingdom) Ross Gunn	P	1–3, 5
(Germany) Walkenhorst Racing	Aston Martin Vantage AMR GT3 Evo	34	(France) Valentin Hasse-Clot	P	4
(Germany) Walkenhorst Racing	Aston Martin Vantage AMR GT3 Evo	35	(United Kingdom) Lorcan Hanafin	S	All
(Germany) Walkenhorst Racing	Aston Martin Vantage AMR GT3 Evo	35	(France) Romain Leroux	S	All
(Germany) Walkenhorst Racing	Aston Martin Vantage AMR GT3 Evo	35	(France) Maxime Robin	S	All
(Germany) Walkenhorst Racing	Aston Martin Vantage AMR GT3 Evo	36	(United Kingdom) Ben Green	B	All
(Germany) Walkenhorst Racing	Aston Martin Vantage AMR GT3 Evo	36	(Netherlands) Mex Jansen	B	All
(Germany) Walkenhorst Racing	Aston Martin Vantage AMR GT3 Evo	36	(United Kingdom) Tim Creswick	B	1–4
(Germany) Walkenhorst Racing	Aston Martin Vantage AMR GT3 Evo	36	(United States) Bijoy Garg	B	2
(Germany) Walkenhorst Racing	Aston Martin Vantage AMR GT3 Evo	36	(Hong Kong) David Pun	B	5
(United States) Mercedes-AMG Team Mann-Filter	Mercedes-AMG GT3 Evo	48	(Austria) Lucas Auer	P	All
(United States) Mercedes-AMG Team Mann-Filter	Mercedes-AMG GT3 Evo	48	(Germany) Maro Engel	P	All
(United States) Mercedes-AMG Team Mann-Filter	Mercedes-AMG GT3 Evo	48	(Canada) Daniel Morad	P	All
(United States) Winward Racing	Mercedes-AMG GT3 Evo	57	(Netherlands) "Daan Arrow"	S	1–4
(United States) Winward Racing	Mercedes-AMG GT3 Evo	57	(Netherlands) Colin Caresani	S	1–4
(United States) Winward Racing	Mercedes-AMG GT3 Evo	57	(Thailand) Tanart Sathienthirakul	S	1–4
(Italy) AF Corse - Francorchamps Motors	Ferrari 296 GT3	51	(Italy) Alessandro Pier Guidi	P	All
(Italy) AF Corse - Francorchamps Motors	Ferrari 296 GT3	51	(Italy) Alessio Rovera	P	All
(Italy) AF Corse - Francorchamps Motors	Ferrari 296 GT3	51	(Italy) Davide Rigon	P	1–3, 5
(Italy) AF Corse - Francorchamps Motors	Ferrari 296 GT3	51	(Monaco) Vincent Abril	P	4
(Italy) AF Corse - Francorchamps Motors	Ferrari 296 GT3	71	(France) Thomas Neubauer	P	All
(Italy) AF Corse - Francorchamps Motors	Ferrari 296 GT3	71	(Spain) David Vidales	P	All
(Italy) AF Corse - Francorchamps Motors	Ferrari 296 GT3	71	(Monaco) Vincent Abril	P	1–3, 5
(Italy) AF Corse - Francorchamps Motors	Ferrari 296 GT3	71	(China) Yifei Ye	P	4
(Italy) AF Corse	Ferrari 296 GT3	52	(Italy) Andrea Bertolini	B	All
(Italy) AF Corse	Ferrari 296 GT3	52	(Belgium) Jef Machiels	B	All
(Italy) AF Corse	Ferrari 296 GT3	52	(Belgium) Louis Machiels	B	All
(Italy) AF Corse	Ferrari 296 GT3	52	(Italy) Tommaso Mosca	B	2
(United Kingdom) Sky – Tempesta Racing	Ferrari 296 GT3	93	(Italy) Eddie Cheever III	B	All
(United Kingdom) Sky – Tempesta Racing	Ferrari 296 GT3	93	(United Kingdom) Chris Froggatt	B	All
(United Kingdom) Sky – Tempesta Racing	Ferrari 296 GT3	93	(Hong Kong) Jonathan Hui	B	All
(United Kingdom) Sky – Tempesta Racing	Ferrari 296 GT3	93	(France) Lilou Wadoux	B	2
(Italy) Dinamic GT	Porsche 911 GT3 R (992)	54	(Germany) Marvin Dienst	B	1–2
(Italy) Dinamic GT	Porsche 911 GT3 R (992)	54	(Portugal) Guilherme Oliveira	B	1–2
(Italy) Dinamic GT	Porsche 911 GT3 R (992)	54	(Austria) Philipp Sager	B	1–2
(Italy) Dinamic GT	Porsche 911 GT3 R (992)	54	(Austria) Christopher Zöchling	B	2
(Italy) Dinamic GT	Porsche 911 GT3 R (992)	55	(Netherlands) Jop Rappange	S	All
(Italy) Dinamic GT	Porsche 911 GT3 R (992)	55	(Norway) Marius Nakken	S	1–2
(Italy) Dinamic GT	Porsche 911 GT3 R (992)	55	(Austria) Christopher Zöchling	S	1
(Italy) Dinamic GT	Porsche 911 GT3 R (992)	55	(Finland) Axel Blom	S	2
(Italy) Dinamic GT	Porsche 911 GT3 R (992)	55	(France) Théo Nouet	S	2–5
(Italy) Dinamic GT	Porsche 911 GT3 R (992)	55	(Portugal) Guilherme Oliveira	S	3–4
(Italy) Dinamic GT	Porsche 911 GT3 R (992)	55	(Italy) Felice Jelmini	S	5
(Bahrain) 2 Seas Motorsport	Mercedes-AMG GT3 Evo	60	(Bahrain) Isa Al Khalifa	G	1–2
(Bahrain) 2 Seas Motorsport	Mercedes-AMG GT3 Evo	60	(Croatia) Martin Kodrić	G	1–2
(Bahrain) 2 Seas Motorsport	Mercedes-AMG GT3 Evo	60	(United Kingdom) Lewis Williamson	G	1–2
(Bahrain) 2 Seas Motorsport	Mercedes-AMG GT3 Evo	60	(United Kingdom) Frank Bird	G	2
(New Zealand) Earl Bamber Motorsport	Porsche 911 GT3 R (992)	61	(New Zealand) Earl Bamber	PA	2
(New Zealand) Earl Bamber Motorsport	Porsche 911 GT3 R (992)	61	(Malaysia) Adrian D'Silva	PA	2
(New Zealand) Earl Bamber Motorsport	Porsche 911 GT3 R (992)	61	(New Zealand) Brendon Leitch	PA	2
(New Zealand) Earl Bamber Motorsport	Porsche 911 GT3 R (992)	61	(China) Kerong Li	PA	2
(Italy) Iron Lynx	Lamborghini Huracán GT3 Evo 2	63	(Italy) Mirko Bortolotti	P	1–4
(Italy) Iron Lynx	Lamborghini Huracán GT3 Evo 2	63	(Italy) Matteo Cairoli	P	1–3, 5
(Italy) Iron Lynx	Lamborghini Huracán GT3 Evo 2	63	(Italy) Andrea Caldarelli	P	1–3, 5
(Italy) Iron Lynx	Lamborghini Huracán GT3 Evo 2	63	(Switzerland) Edoardo Mortara	P	4
(Italy) Iron Lynx	Lamborghini Huracán GT3 Evo 2	63	(Italy) Leonardo Pulcini	P	4
(Italy) Iron Lynx	Lamborghini Huracán GT3 Evo 2	63	(Italy) Loris Spinelli	P	5
(Germany) Proton Competition	Ford Mustang GT3	64	(Germany) Christopher Mies	P	All
(Germany) Proton Competition	Ford Mustang GT3	64	(Belgium) Frédéric Vervisch	P	All
(Germany) Proton Competition	Ford Mustang GT3	64	(Norway) Dennis Olsen	P	1–4
(Germany) Proton Competition	Ford Mustang GT3	64	(United Kingdom) Ben Barker	P	5
(United Kingdom) Barwell Motorsport	Lamborghini Huracán GT3 Evo 2	72	(Finland) Patrick Kujala	B	All
(United Kingdom) Barwell Motorsport	Lamborghini Huracán GT3 Evo 2	72	(Luxembourg) Gabriel Rindone	B	All
(United Kingdom) Barwell Motorsport	Lamborghini Huracán GT3 Evo 2	72	(United Kingdom) Casper Stevenson	B	All
(United Kingdom) Barwell Motorsport	Lamborghini Huracán GT3 Evo 2	72	(Italy) Mattia Michelotto	B	2
(United Kingdom) Barwell Motorsport	Lamborghini Huracán GT3 Evo 2	78	(United Kingdom) Till Bechtolsheimer	B	All
(United Kingdom) Barwell Motorsport	Lamborghini Huracán GT3 Evo 2	78	(United Kingdom) Sandy Mitchell	B	All
(United Kingdom) Barwell Motorsport	Lamborghini Huracán GT3 Evo 2	78	(France) Antoine Doquin	B	1–4
(United Kingdom) Barwell Motorsport	Lamborghini Huracán GT3 Evo 2	78	(United Kingdom) Ricky Collard	B	2, 5
(Germany) Haupt Racing Team	Mercedes-AMG GT3 Evo	77	(Italy) Michele Beretta	G	All
(Germany) Haupt Racing Team	Mercedes-AMG GT3 Evo	77	(India) Arjun Maini	G	All
(Germany) Haupt Racing Team	Mercedes-AMG GT3 Evo	77	(Germany) Jusuf Owega	G	All
(Austria) Eastalent Racing	Audi R8 LMS Evo II	84	(Poland) Karol Basz	P	3
(Austria) Eastalent Racing	Audi R8 LMS Evo II	84	(Spain) Albert Costa	P	3
(Austria) Eastalent Racing	Audi R8 LMS Evo II	84	(Austria) Simon Reicher	P	3
(Italy) Imperiale Racing	Lamborghini Huracán GT3 Evo 2	85	(United States) Phillippe Denes	G	5
(Italy) Imperiale Racing	Lamborghini Huracán GT3 Evo 2	85	(Italy) Alberto Di Folco	G	5
(Italy) Imperiale Racing	Lamborghini Huracán GT3 Evo 2	85	(Denmark) Dennis Lind	G	5
(Argentina) Madpanda Motorsport	Mercedes-AMG GT3 Evo	90	(Germany) Patrick Assenheimer	S	1–3
(Argentina) Madpanda Motorsport	Mercedes-AMG GT3 Evo	90	(Argentina) Ezequiel Pérez Companc	S	1–3
(Argentina) Madpanda Motorsport	Mercedes-AMG GT3 Evo	90	(Poland) Karol Basz	S	2
(Argentina) Madpanda Motorsport	Mercedes-AMG GT3 Evo	90	(Switzerland) Alain Valente	S	2
(Argentina) Madpanda Motorsport	Mercedes-AMG GT3 Evo	90	(Germany) Tom Kalender	S	3
(Germany) Rutronik Racing	Porsche 911 GT3 R (992)	96	(France) Julien Andlauer	P	All
(Germany) Rutronik Racing	Porsche 911 GT3 R (992)	96	(Germany) Sven Müller	P	All
(Germany) Rutronik Racing	Porsche 911 GT3 R (992)	96	(Switzerland) Patric Niederhauser	P	All
(Germany) Rutronik Racing	Porsche 911 GT3 R (992)	97	(United States) Dustin Blattner	B	All
(Germany) Rutronik Racing	Porsche 911 GT3 R (992)	97	(Germany) Dennis Marschall	B	All
(Germany) Rutronik Racing	Porsche 911 GT3 R (992)	97	(Netherlands) Loek Hartog	B	1–3, 5
(Germany) Rutronik Racing	Porsche 911 GT3 R (992)	97	(Canada) Zacharie Robichon	B	2
(Germany) Rutronik Racing	Porsche 911 GT3 R (992)	97	(Switzerland) Alexander Fach	B	4
(Germany) ROWE Racing	BMW M4 GT3	98	(Germany) Marco Wittmann	P	1–4
(Germany) ROWE Racing	BMW M4 GT3	98	(Austria) Philipp Eng	P	1–3
(Germany) ROWE Racing	BMW M4 GT3	98	(United Kingdom) Nick Yelloly	P	1–3
(Germany) ROWE Racing	BMW M4 GT3	98	(Netherlands) Robin Frijns	P	4
(Germany) ROWE Racing	BMW M4 GT3	98	(Netherlands) Maxime Oosten	P	4
(Germany) ROWE Racing	BMW M4 GT3	998	(Brazil) Augusto Farfus	P	All
(Germany) ROWE Racing	BMW M4 GT3	998	(United Kingdom) Dan Harper	P	All
(Germany) ROWE Racing	BMW M4 GT3	998	(Germany) Max Hesse	P	All
(United Kingdom) Team RJN	McLaren 720S GT3 Evo	100	(United Kingdom) Alex Buncombe	PA	2
(United Kingdom) Team RJN	McLaren 720S GT3 Evo	100	(United Kingdom) Chris Buncombe	PA	2
(United Kingdom) Team RJN	McLaren 720S GT3 Evo	100	(United Kingdom) Josh Caygill	PA	2
(United Kingdom) Team RJN	McLaren 720S GT3 Evo	100	(United Kingdom) Jann Mardenborough	PA	2
(France) CSA Racing	Audi R8 LMS Evo II	111	(France) Arthur Rougier	G	All
(France) CSA Racing	Audi R8 LMS Evo II	111	(France) Romain Carton	G	1–4
(France) CSA Racing	Audi R8 LMS Evo II	111	(France) Adam Eteki	G	1–2
(France) CSA Racing	Audi R8 LMS Evo II	111	(France) Steven Palette	G	2
(France) CSA Racing	Audi R8 LMS Evo II	111	(United Kingdom) Hugo Cook	G	3–5
(France) CSA Racing	Audi R8 LMS Evo II	111	(France) Simon Gachet	G	5
(Hong Kong) Mercedes-AMG Team GruppeM Racing	Mercedes-AMG GT3 Evo	130	(Estonia) Ralf Aron	P	2
(Hong Kong) Mercedes-AMG Team GruppeM Racing	Mercedes-AMG GT3 Evo	130	(Spain) Daniel Juncadella	P	2
(Hong Kong) Mercedes-AMG Team GruppeM Racing	Mercedes-AMG GT3 Evo	130	(Denmark) Frederik Vesti	P	2
(United Kingdom) Garage 59	McLaren 720S GT3 Evo	158	(Denmark) Nicolai Kjærgaard	B	All
(United Kingdom) Garage 59	McLaren 720S GT3 Evo	158	(United Kingdom) Mark Sansom	B	All
(United Kingdom) Garage 59	McLaren 720S GT3 Evo	158	(United Kingdom) Lewis Proctor	B	1
(United Kingdom) Garage 59	McLaren 720S GT3 Evo	158	(United Kingdom) Chris Salkeld	B	2–3
(United Kingdom) Garage 59	McLaren 720S GT3 Evo	158	(United Kingdom) James Baldwin	B	2, 4–5
(United Kingdom) Garage 59	McLaren 720S GT3 Evo	159	(United Kingdom) Tom Gamble	P	All
(United Kingdom) Garage 59	McLaren 720S GT3 Evo	159	(Germany) Benjamin Goethe	P	All
(United Kingdom) Garage 59	McLaren 720S GT3 Evo	159	(United Kingdom) Dean MacDonald	P	All
(United Kingdom) Garage 59	McLaren 720S GT3 Evo	188	(Monaco) Louis Prette	B	1–4
(United Kingdom) Garage 59	McLaren 720S GT3 Evo	188	(United Kingdom) Adam Smalley	B	1–4
(United Kingdom) Garage 59	McLaren 720S GT3 Evo	188	(United Kingdom) James Cottingham	B	1
(United Kingdom) Garage 59	McLaren 720S GT3 Evo	188	(Germany) Marvin Kirchhöfer	B	2
(United Kingdom) Garage 59	McLaren 720S GT3 Evo	188	(Portugal) Miguel Ramos	B	2–4
(United Kingdom) Garage 59	McLaren 720S GT3 Evo	188	(Germany) Marvin Kirchhöfer	P	5
(United Kingdom) Garage 59	McLaren 720S GT3 Evo	188	(Monaco) Louis Prette	P	5
(United Kingdom) Garage 59	McLaren 720S GT3 Evo	188	(United Kingdom) Adam Smalley	P	5
(Germany) / Rinaldi Racing (Note: Car No. 333 entered as Rinaldi Racing at rounds 1–2 and 4–5, and as Frikadelli Racing at round 3.); (Germany) / Frikadelli Racing	Ferrari 296 GT3	333	(Germany) Felipe Fernández Laser	B	All
(Germany) / Rinaldi Racing; (Germany) / Frikadelli Racing	Ferrari 296 GT3	333	(South Africa) David Perel	B	All
(Germany) / Rinaldi Racing; (Germany) / Frikadelli Racing	Ferrari 296 GT3	333	(Germany) Christian Hook	B	1–2, 4–5
(Germany) / Rinaldi Racing; (Germany) / Frikadelli Racing	Ferrari 296 GT3	333	(Italy) Fabrizio Crestani	B	2
(Germany) / Rinaldi Racing; (Germany) / Frikadelli Racing	Ferrari 296 GT3	333	(Germany) Klaus Abbelen	B	3
(Australia) Triple Eight JMR	Mercedes-AMG GT3 Evo	888	(Malaysia) Prince Jefri Ibrahim	PA	2
(Australia) Triple Eight JMR	Mercedes-AMG GT3 Evo	888	(Austria) Martin Konrad	PA	2
(Australia) Triple Eight JMR	Mercedes-AMG GT3 Evo	888	(Australia) Jordan Love	PA	2
(Australia) Triple Eight JMR	Mercedes-AMG GT3 Evo	888	(United Kingdom) Alexander Sims	PA	2
(United Kingdom) / Century Motorsport (Note: Car No. 991 entered as Century Motorsport at rounds 1–3, and as Paradine Competition at round 4.); (United Kingdom) / Paradine Competition	BMW M4 GT3	991	(United Kingdom) Darren Leung	B	All
(United Kingdom) / Century Motorsport; (United Kingdom) / Paradine Competition	BMW M4 GT3	991	(United Kingdom) Toby Sowery	B	All
(United Kingdom) / Century Motorsport; (United Kingdom) / Paradine Competition	BMW M4 GT3	991	(United Kingdom) Jake Dennis	B	1, 3–5
(United Kingdom) / Century Motorsport; (United Kingdom) / Paradine Competition	BMW M4 GT3	991	(United States) Connor De Phillippi	B	2
(United Kingdom) / Century Motorsport; (United Kingdom) / Paradine Competition	BMW M4 GT3	991	(Brazil) Pedro Ebrahim	B	2
(Chinese Taipei) HubAuto Racing	Porsche 911 GT3 R (992)	992	(France) Kévin Estre	P	2
(Chinese Taipei) HubAuto Racing	Porsche 911 GT3 R (992)	992	(France) Patrick Pilet	P	2
(Chinese Taipei) HubAuto Racing	Porsche 911 GT3 R (992)	992	(Belgium) Laurens Vanthoor	P	2

Icon	Class
P	Pro Cup
G	Gold Cup
S	Silver Cup
B	Bronze Cup
PA	Pro-Am Cup

Notes:

- Dinamic GT was scheduled to run a pair of Ford Mustang GT3s, but parted ways with Ford and returned to Porsche prior to the start of the season. Christopher Mies, Dennis Olsen and Frédéric Vervisch were set to share a Pro-class entry, with Ben Barker, Philipp Sager and Christopher Zöchling in a Bronze Cup car. Proton Competition later set up a one-car programme to accommodate Mies, Olsen and Vervisch.
- GMB Motorsport was scheduled to enter an Aston Martin Vantage AMR GT3 Evo in Silver Cup for Gustav Birch, Simon Birch and Kasper H. Jensen, but the team folded prior to the start of the season.
- Alexander Schwarzer was scheduled to compete for Herberth Motorsport, but was forced to withdraw as the Pro-Am Cup was discontinued and the No. 91 car moved to Bronze Cup.
- Finlay Hutchison was scheduled to compete for Comtoyou Racing, but was replaced by Esteban Muth on the eve of the opening round.
- Century Motorsport originally planned to field a second Bronze Cup BMW for the blue-riband 24 Hours of Spa. It was later withdrawn and replaced by the No. 5 Optimum Motorsport McLaren.
- Iron Dames had entered a Bronze Cup Lamborghini for Sarah Bovy, Rahel Frey and Michelle Gatting at the 24 Hours of Spa. However, after an accident for Bovy at the preceding Sahlen's Six Hours of The Glen, the team elected to withdraw to allow the Belgian time to recover.

== Race results ==
Bold indicates the overall winner.

Round	Circuit	Pole position	Overall winners	Gold winners	Silver winners	Bronze winners	Pro/Am winners	Report
1	(France) Paul Ricard	(Italy) #63 Iron Lynx	**(Germany) #998 ROWE Racing**	(France) #25 Saintéloc Racing	(United States) #57 Winward Racing	(Switzerland) #8 Kessel Racing	No Entries	Report
1	(France) Paul Ricard	(Italy) Mirko Bortolotti (Italy) Matteo Cairoli (Italy) Andrea Caldarelli	**(Brazil) Augusto Farfus** **(United Kingdom) Dan Harper** **(Germany) Max Hesse**	(France) Paul Evrard (Belgium) Gilles Magnus (France) Jim Pla	(Netherlands) "Daan Arrow" (Netherlands) Colin Caresani (Thailand) Tanart Sathienthirakul	(Italy) David Fumanelli (Switzerland) Nicolò Rosi (Italy) Niccolò Schirò	No Entries	Report
2	(Belgium) Spa-Francorchamps	(Austria) #163 GRT Grasser Racing Team	**(Belgium) #7 Comtoyou Racing**	(Oman) #777 AlManar Racing by GetSpeed	(Germany) #3 GetSpeed Performance	(Germany) #66 Tresor Attempto Racing	(United States) #4 CrowdStrike by Riley	Report
2	(Belgium) Spa-Francorchamps	(Italy) Marco Mapelli (South Africa) Jordan Pepper (France) Franck Perera	**(Italy) Mattia Drudi** **(Denmark) Marco Sørensen** **(Denmark) Nicki Thiim**	(Oman) Al Faisal Al Zubair (Austria) Dominik Baumann (Switzerland) Philip Ellis (Canada) Mikaël Grenier	(United States) Anthony Bartone (United Kingdom) James Kell (Switzerland) Yannick Mettler (United Kingdom) Aaron Walker	(Austria) Max Hofer; Andrey Mukovoz (Kyrgyzstan) Alexey Nesov (Luxembourg) Dylan Pereira	(United States) Colin Braun (Netherlands) Nicky Catsburg (United Kingdom) Ian James (United States) George Kurtz	Report
3	(Germany) Nürburgring	(Germany) #96 Rutronik Racing	**(Austria) #163 GRT Grasser Racing Team**	(France) #25 Saintéloc Racing	(Belgium) #10 Boutsen VDS	(Germany) #97 Rutronik Racing	No Entries	Report
3	(Germany) Nürburgring	(France) Julien Andlauer (Germany) Sven Müller (Switzerland) Patric Niederhauser	**(Italy) Marco Mapelli** **(South Africa) Jordan Pepper** **(France) Franck Perera**	(France) Paul Evrard (Belgium) Gilles Magnus (France) Jim Pla	(France) César Gazeau (United States) Roee Meyuhas (France) Aurélien Panis	(United States) Dustin Blattner (Netherlands) Loek Hartog (Germany) Dennis Marschall	No Entries	Report
4	(Italy) Monza	(Italy) #51 AF Corse - Francorchamps Motors	**#30 OQ by Oman Racing**	(Germany) #77 Haupt Racing Team	(United States) #57 Winward Racing	**#30 OQ by Oman Racing**	No Entries	Report
4	(Italy) Monza	(Monaco) Vincent Abril (Italy) Alessandro Pier Guidi (Italy) Alessio Rovera	**(Oman) Ahmad Al Harthy** **(United Kingdom) Sam De Haan** **(Germany) Jens Klingmann**	(Italy) Michele Beretta (India) Arjun Maini (Germany) Jusuf Owega	(Netherlands) "Daan Arrow" (Netherlands) Colin Caresani (Thailand) Tanart Sathienthirakul	**(Oman) Ahmad Al Harthy** **(United Kingdom) Sam De Haan** **(Germany) Jens Klingmann**	No Entries	Report
5	(Saudi Arabia) Jeddah	(Italy) #51 AF Corse - Francorchamps Motors	**(United States) No. 48 Mercedes-AMG Team Mann-Filter**	(France) #25 Saintéloc Racing	(France) #26 Saintéloc Racing	(Germany) #97 Rutronik Racing	No Entries	Report
5	(Saudi Arabia) Jeddah	(Italy) Alessandro Pier Guidi (Italy) Davide Rigon (Italy) Alessio Rovera	**(Austria) Lucas Auer** **(Germany) Maro Engel** **(Canada) Daniel Morad**	(France) Paul Evrard (Belgium) Gilles Magnus (France) Jim Pla	(Argentina) Ezequiel Pérez Companc (Switzerland) Lucas Légeret (Belgium) Kobe Pauwels	(United States) Dustin Blattner (Netherlands) Loek Hartog (Germany) Dennis Marschall	No Entries	Report

== Championship standings ==
Scoring system

Championship points are awarded for the first ten positions in each race. The pole-sitter also receives one point and entries are required to complete 75% of the winning car's race distance in order to be classified and earn points. Individual drivers are required to participate for a minimum of 25 minutes in order to earn championship points in any race.

Paul Ricard, Nürburgring & Monza points

Position	1st	2nd	3rd	4th	5th	6th	7th	8th	9th	10th	Pole
Points	25	18	15	12	10	8	6	4	2	1	1

Jeddah points

Position	1st	2nd	3rd	4th	5th	6th	7th	8th	9th	10th	Pole
Points	33	24	19	15	12	9	6	4	2	1	1

24 Hours of Spa points

Points are awarded after six hours, after twelve hours and at the finish.

Position	1st	2nd	3rd	4th	5th	6th	7th	8th	9th	10th	Pole
Points after 6hrs/12hrs	12	9	7	6	5	4	3	2	1	0	1
Points at the finish	25	18	15	12	10	8	6	4	2	1	1

=== Drivers' Championship ===
==== Overall ====
Pos.	Drivers	Team	LEC (France)	SPA (Belgium)			NÜR (Germany)	MNZ (Italy)	JED (Saudi Arabia)	Points
Pos.	Drivers	Team	LEC (France)	6hrs	12hrs	24hrs	NÜR (Germany)	MNZ (Italy)	JED (Saudi Arabia)	Points
1	(Italy) Alessandro Pier Guidi (Italy) Alessio Rovera	(Italy) AF Corse - Francorchamps Motors	9	5	4	2	8	3^{PF}	3^{P}	71
2	(Italy) Marco Mapelli (France) Franck Perera	(Austria) GRT Grasser Racing Team	11	17	8	5^{PF}	1	10	2^{F}	63
2	(South Africa) Jordan Pepper	(Austria) GRT Grasser Racing Team		17	8	5^{PF}	1	10	2^{F}	63
3	(Germany) Alex Aka (Switzerland) Ricardo Feller (Germany) Christopher Haase	(Germany) Tresor Attempto Racing	6	3	1	12	4	4	6	60
4	(Italy) Mattia Drudi (Denmark) Marco Sørensen (Denmark) Nicki Thiim	(Belgium) Comtoyou Racing	7	1	7	1	6	Ret	10	55
5	(Italy) Davide Rigon	(Italy) AF Corse - Francorchamps Motors	9	5	4	2	8		3^{P}	55
6	(Austria) Lucas Auer (Germany) Maro Engel (Canada) Daniel Morad	(United States) Mercedes-AMG Team Mann-Filter	45†	10	35	Ret	3^{F}	16	1	48
7	(South Africa) Sheldon van der Linde (Belgium) Dries Vanthoor (Belgium) Charles Weerts	(Belgium) Team WRT	Ret	15	16	3	44	2	4	48
8	(Brazil) Augusto Farfus (United Kingdom) Dan Harper (Germany) Max Hesse	(Germany) ROWE Racing	1^{F}	7	17	6	11	27	Ret	36
9	(Switzerland) Raffaele Marciello (Belgium) Maxime Martin (Italy) Valentino Rossi	(Belgium) Team WRT	4	28	10	24	18	5	5	34
10	(Italy) Matteo Cairoli (Italy) Andrea Caldarelli	(Italy) Iron Lynx	2^{P}	57†	Ret	Ret	9		7	27
11	(Oman) Ahmad Al Harthy (United Kingdom) Sam De Haan (Germany) Jens Klingmann	OQ by Oman Racing	27	43	34	Ret	35	1	19	25
12	(France) Thomas Drouet (Germany) Maximilian Götz	(Belgium) Boutsen VDS	16	2	9	18	7	6	12	24
13	(Andorra) Jules Gounon (Germany) Fabian Schiller (Germany) Luca Stolz	(Germany) Mercedes-AMG Team GetSpeed	3	24	5	Ret	12	Ret	8	24
14	(Italy) Mirko Bortolotti	(Italy) Iron Lynx	2^{P}	57†	Ret	Ret	9	18		21
15	(France) Dorian Boccolacci (Turkey) Ayhancan Güven	(France) Schumacher CLRT	14	58†	Ret	Ret	2	Ret	Ret	18
15	(Germany) Laurin Heinrich	(France) Schumacher CLRT	14	58†	Ret	Ret	2		Ret	18
16	(Monaco) Vincent Abril	(Italy) AF Corse - Francorchamps Motors	17	13	22	Ret	10	3^{PF}	21	17
17	(France) Julien Andlauer (Germany) Sven Müller (Switzerland) Patric Niederhauser	(Germany) Rutronik Racing	5	38	25	9	Ret^{P}	13	36†	13
18	(Portugal) Henrique Chaves (United Kingdom) David Pittard	(Germany) Walkenhorst Motorsport	Ret	16	15	4	13	23	11	12
18	(United Kingdom) Ross Gunn	(Germany) Walkenhorst Motorsport	Ret	16	15	4	13		11	12
19	(Austria) Klaus Bachler (United Kingdom) Alex Malykhin (Germany) Joel Sturm	(Lithuania) Pure Rxcing	8	11	6	Ret	20	8	14	12
20	(Switzerland) Philip Ellis	(Oman) AlManar Racing by GetSpeed		30	23	7				12
20	(Switzerland) Philip Ellis	(Belgium) Boutsen VDS					7			12
21	(Belgium) Ulysse de Pauw	(Belgium) Boutsen VDS		2	9	18				10
21	(Italy) Andrea Bertolini (Belgium) Jef Machiels (Belgium) Louis Machiels	(Italy) AF Corse	23	9	2	13	40	Ret	25	10
21	(Italy) Tommaso Mosca	(Italy) AF Corse		9	2	13				10
22	(Germany) Marco Wittmann	(Germany) ROWE Racing	12	Ret	Ret	Ret	5	WD		10
22	(Austria) Philipp Eng (United Kingdom) Nick Yelloly	(Germany) ROWE Racing	12	Ret	Ret	Ret	5			10
23	(Austria) Max Hofer; Andrey Mukovoz	(Germany) Tresor Attempto Racing	Ret	29	3	10	Ret	11	Ret	8
23	(Luxembourg) Dylan Pereira	(Germany) Tresor Attempto Racing	Ret	29	3	10	Ret		Ret	8
23	(Kyrgyzstan) Alexey Nesov	(Germany) Tresor Attempto Racing		29	3	10				8
24	(Brazil) Sergio Sette Camara	(Belgium) Boutsen VDS						6		8
25	(Italy) Eddie Cheever III (United Kingdom) Chris Froggatt (Hong Kong) Jonathan Hui	(United Kingdom) Sky – Tempesta Racing	25	4	12	16	33	12	28	6
25	(France) Lilou Wadoux	(United Kingdom) Sky – Tempesta Racing		4	12	16				6
26	(Oman) Al Faisal Al Zubair (Austria) Dominik Baumann	(Oman) AlManar Racing by GetSpeed	15	30	23	7	17	Ret	20	6
26	(Canada) Mikaël Grenier	(Oman) AlManar Racing by GetSpeed	15	30	23	7	17		20	6
26	(United Kingdom) Darren Leung (United Kingdom) Toby Sowery	(United Kingdom) Century Motorsport	49†	49	44	33	30	7	Ret	6
26	(United Kingdom) Jake Dennis	(United Kingdom) Century Motorsport	49†				30	7	Ret	6
26	(Italy) Loris Spinelli	(Italy) Iron Lynx							7	6
27	(Sweden) Joel Eriksson (New Zealand) Jaxon Evans (Austria) Thomas Preining	(China) Phantom Global Racing		6	20	26				4
28	(Australia) Matt Campbell (France) Mathieu Jaminet (France) Frédéric Makowiecki	(Germany) SSR Herberth		22	11	8				4
29	(Belgium) Matisse Lismont	(Belgium) Comtoyou Racing	41	8	45	32	45	32	23	2
29	(United Kingdom) Charles Clark	(Belgium) Comtoyou Racing	41	8	45	32	45	32		2
29	(Belgium) Sam Dejonghe	(Belgium) Comtoyou Racing	41	8	45	32	45			2
29	(Netherlands) Xavier Maassen	(Belgium) Comtoyou Racing		8	45	32				2
30	(Netherlands) "Daan Arrow" (Netherlands) Colin Caresani (Thailand) Tanart Sathienthirakul	(United States) Winward Racing	19	14	19	28	25	9		2
30	(United Kingdom) Tom Gamble (Germany) Benjamin Goethe (United Kingdom) Dean MacDonald	(United Kingdom) Garage 59	Ret	35	29	11	14	14	9	2
31	(Germany) Christopher Mies (Belgium) Frédéric Vervisch	(Germany) Proton Competition	10	40	13	19	24	20	Ret	1
31	(Norway) Dennis Olsen	(Germany) Proton Competition	10	40	13	19	24	20		1
31	(France) Thomas Neubauer (Spain) David Vidales	(Italy) AF Corse - Francorchamps Motors	17	13	22	Ret	10	34	21	1
–	(Germany) Christian Engelhart	(Austria) GRT Grasser Racing Team	11							0
–	(Estonia) Ralf Aron	(Hong Kong) Mercedes-AMG Team GruppeM Racing		12	36	Ret				0
–	(Estonia) Ralf Aron	(Belgium) Boutsen VDS							12	0
–	(France) Paul Evrard (Belgium) Gilles Magnus (France) Jim Pla	(France) Saintéloc Racing	13	37	21	15	15	26	18	0
–	(Belgium) Kobe Pauwels	(Belgium) Comtoyou Racing	24	18	33	20	Ret	15		0
–	(Belgium) Kobe Pauwels	(France) Saintéloc Racing							13	0
–	(Argentina) Ezequiel Pérez Companc	(Argentina) Madpanda Motorsport	22	19	43	31	32			0
–	(Argentina) Ezequiel Pérez Companc	(France) Saintéloc Racing						29	13	0
–	(Switzerland) Lucas Légeret	(France) Saintéloc Racing							13	0
–	(Finland) Patrick Kujala (Luxembourg) Gabriel Rindone (United Kingdom) Casper Stevenson	(United Kingdom) Barwell Motorsport	37	34	18	14	39	37†	29	0
–	(Italy) Mattia Michelotto	(United Kingdom) Barwell Motorsport		34	18	14				0
–	(Belgium) Ugo de Wilde	(France) Saintéloc Racing	48†	37	21	15	37			0
–	(France) César Gazeau (France) Aurélien Panis	(Belgium) Boutsen VDS	21	27	32	40	16	Ret	15	0
–	(United States) Roee Meyuhas	(Belgium) Boutsen VDS	21	27	32	40	16	Ret		0
–	(France) Sébastien Baud	(Belgium) Boutsen VDS		27	32	40				0
–	(Belgium) Nicolas Baert (Denmark) Sebastian Øgaard	(Belgium) Comtoyou Racing	46	Ret	Ret	Ret	38	15	23	0
–	(France) Erwan Bastard	(Belgium) Comtoyou Racing		Ret	Ret	Ret				0
–	(Belgium) Esteban Muth	(Belgium) Comtoyou Racing	46	Ret	Ret	Ret	38			0
–	(Belgium) Esteban Muth	(Belgium) Boutsen VDS							15	0
–	(United Kingdom) James Cottingham	(United Kingdom) Garage 59	38							0
–	(Monaco) Louis Prette (United Kingdom) Adam Smalley	(United Kingdom) Garage 59	38	46	42	39	34	Ret	16	0
–	(Portugal) Miguel Ramos	(United Kingdom) Garage 59		46	42	39	34	Ret		0
–	(Germany) Marvin Kirchhöfer	(United Kingdom) Garage 59		46	42	39			16	0
–	(United Kingdom) Adam Christodoulou	(Belgium) Boutsen VDS	16							0
–	(United States) Dustin Blattner (Germany) Dennis Marschall	(Germany) Rutronik Racing	31	Ret	Ret	Ret	22	17	17	0
–	(Netherlands) Loek Hartog	(Germany) Rutronik Racing	31	Ret	Ret	Ret	22		17	0
–	(Canada) Zacharie Robichon	(Germany) Rutronik Racing		Ret	Ret	Ret				0
–	(Italy) Michele Beretta (India) Arjun Maini (Germany) Jusuf Owega	(Germany) Haupt Racing Team	47	47	40	17	19	22	34†	0
–	(Switzerland) Alexander Fach	(Germany) Lionspeed x Herberth		41	28	22				0
–	(Switzerland) Alexander Fach	(Germany) Rutronik Racing						17		0
–	(France) Arthur Rougier	(France) CSA Racing	18	51	54†	Ret	21	33	Ret	0
–	(France) Romain Carton	(France) CSA Racing	18	51	54†	Ret	21	33		0
–	(France) Adam Eteki	(France) CSA Racing	18	51	54†	Ret				0
–	(France) Steven Palette	(France) CSA Racing		51	54†	Ret				0
–	(Switzerland) Edoardo Mortara (Italy) Leonardo Pulcini	(Italy) Iron Lynx						18		0
–	(United Kingdom) Lorcan Hanafin (France) Romain Leroux (France) Maxime Robin	(Germany) Walkenhorst Racing	34	26	30	44†	Ret	19	31	0
–	(Netherlands) Job van Uitert	(Belgium) Comtoyou Racing	24	18	33	20	Ret	32	35†	0
–	(Belgium) John de Wilde	(Belgium) Comtoyou Racing	24	18	33	20	Ret	30		0
–	(Netherlands) Dante Rappange	(Belgium) Comtoyou Racing		18	33	20				0
–	(United Kingdom) James Jakes (Netherlands) Niels Koolen	(Belgium) Comtoyou Racing						30	35†	0
–	(Italy) David Fumanelli (Switzerland) Nicolò Rosi (Italy) Niccolò Schirò	(Switzerland) Kessel Racing	20	39	27	43†		21	Ret	0
–	(Italy) Daniele Di Amato	(Switzerland) Kessel Racing		39	27	43†				0
–	(Spain) Fran Rueda	(United Kingdom) Optimum Motorsport		25	37	21		36		0
–	(United Kingdom) Rob Bell (United Kingdom) Mark Radcliffe	(United Kingdom) Optimum Motorsport	Ret	25	37	21		36		0
–	(United Kingdom) Ollie Millroy	(United Kingdom) Optimum Motorsport	Ret	25	37	21				0
–	(United Kingdom) Hugo Cook	(Austria) GRT Grasser Racing Team	44	50	47	37				0
–	(United Kingdom) Hugo Cook	(France) CSA Racing					21	33	Ret	0
–	(Germany) Tom Kalender	(Argentina) Madpanda Motorsport					32			0
–	(Germany) Patrick Assenheimer	(Argentina) Madpanda Motorsport	22	19	43	31	32			0
–	(Switzerland) Alain Valente	(Argentina) Madpanda Motorsport		19	43	31				0
–	(Hong Kong) Antares Au (Belgium) Alessio Picariello (Estonia) Martin Rump	(Germany) Lionspeed x Herberth		41	28	22				0
–	(United Kingdom) Lewis Proctor	(United Kingdom) Garage 59	43							0
–	(Denmark) Nicolai Kjærgaard (United Kingdom) Mark Sansom	(United Kingdom) Garage 59	43	56	52	38	43	Ret	22	0
–	(United Kingdom) Chris Salkeld	(United Kingdom) Garage 59		56	52	38	43			0
–	(United Kingdom) James Baldwin	(United Kingdom) Garage 59		56	52	38		Ret	22	0
–	(United Kingdom) Shaun Balfe (United Kingdom) Ben Barnicoat (United Kingdom) Sam Neary (Netherlands) Ruben del Sarte	(United Kingdom) Optimum Motorsport		45	39	23				0
–	(Italy) Lorenzo Ferrari (Italy) Leonardo Moncini (Italy) Lorenzo Patrese	(Germany) Tresor Attempto Racing	40	48	46	30	23	Ret	Ret	0
–	(Netherlands) Glenn van Berlo	(Germany) Tresor Attempto Racing		48	46	30				0
–	(France) Valentin Hasse-Clot	(Germany) Walkenhorst Racing						23		0
–	(Italy) Andrea Cola (Italy) Pietro Delli Guanti (Italy) Rocco Mazzola	(Germany) Tresor Attempto Racing							24	0
–	(United States) Anthony Bartone (United Kingdom) James Kell (Switzerland) Yannick Mettler	(Germany) GetSpeed	39	33	14	25	41	35	30	0
–	(United Kingdom) Aaron Walker	(Germany) GetSpeed		33	14	25				0
–	(Germany) Klaus Abbelen	(Germany) Rinaldi Racing / Frikadelli Racing					36			0
–	(Germany) Felipe Fernández Laser (South Africa) David Perel	(Germany) Rinaldi Racing / Frikadelli Racing	32	Ret	Ret	Ret	36	25	Ret	0
–	(Germany) Christian Hook	(Germany) Rinaldi Racing / Frikadelli Racing	32	Ret	Ret	Ret		25	Ret	0
–	(Italy) Fabrizio Crestani	(Germany) Rinaldi Racing / Frikadelli Racing		Ret	Ret	Ret				0
–	(Switzerland) Alex Fontana (United States) "Hash"	(Switzerland) Kessel Racing						Ret		0
–	(United Kingdom) Ben Tuck	(Switzerland) Kessel Racing	26	54	49	45†		Ret		0
–	(United Kingdom) Matt Bell (United Kingdom) John Hartshorne	(Switzerland) Kessel Racing	26	54	49	45†				0
–	(United States) Chandler Hull	(Switzerland) Kessel Racing		54	49	45†				0
–	(Norway) Marius Nakken	(Italy) Dinamic GT	42	21	24	27				0
–	(Netherlands) Jop Rappange	(Italy) Dinamic GT	42	21	24	27	27	28	26	0
–	(France) Théo Nouet	(Italy) Dinamic GT		21	24	27	27	28	26	0
–	(Finland) Axel Blom	(Italy) Dinamic GT		21	24	27				0
–	(Poland) Karol Basz	(Argentina) Madpanda Motorsport		19	43	31				0
–	(Poland) Karol Basz	(Austria) Eastalent Racing					26			0
–	(Spain) Albert Costa (Austria) Simon Reicher	(Austria) Eastalent Racing					26			0
–	(Italy) Felice Jelmini	(Italy) BMW Italia Ceccato Racing						31		0
–	(Italy) Felice Jelmini	(Italy) Dinamic GT							26	0
–	(Germany) Ralf Bohn (Germany) Robert Renauer (Netherlands) Morris Schuring	(Germany) Herberth Motorsport	28	32	Ret	Ret	DNS	Ret	27	0
–	(Germany) Alfred Renauer	(Germany) Herberth Motorsport		32	Ret	Ret				0
–	(Portugal) Guilherme Oliveira	(Italy) Dinamic GT	35	Ret	Ret	Ret	27	28		0
–	(Germany) Florian Spengler	(Germany) Lionspeed GP	30							0
–	(Denmark) Bastian Buus (Germany) Patrick Kolb	(Germany) Lionspeed GP	30				28	Ret	Ret	0
–	(Netherlands) Michael Verhagen	(Germany) Lionspeed GP					28	Ret	Ret	0
–	(United Kingdom) Ricky Collard	(United Kingdom) Barwell Motorsport		42	50	35			32	0
–	(United Kingdom) Till Bechtolsheimer (United Kingdom) Sandy Mitchell	(United Kingdom) Barwell Motorsport	29	42	50	35	29	Ret	32	0
–	(France) Antoine Doquin	(United Kingdom) Barwell Motorsport	29	42	50	35	29	Ret		0
–	(France) Michael Blanchemain	(France) Saintéloc Racing					37			0
–	(France) Alban Varutti	(France) Saintéloc Racing	48†	53	48	34	37	29		0
–	(Ukraine) Ivan Klymenko	(France) Saintéloc Racing	48†	53	48	34		29		0
–	(Norway) Marcus Påverud (Belgium) Gilles Stadsbader	(France) Saintéloc Racing		53	48	34				0
–	(United States) Colin Braun (Netherlands) Nicky Catsburg (United Kingdom) Ian James (United States) George Kurtz	(United States) CrowdStrike by Riley		44	38	29				0
–	(Spain) Isaac Tutumlu	(Austria) GRT Grasser Racing Team							Ret	0
–	(France) Loris Cabirou	(Austria) GRT Grasser Racing Team					31		Ret	0
–	(Italy) Mateo Llarena	(Austria) GRT Grasser Racing Team	44	50	47	37	31	Ret	Ret	0
–	(Kuwait) Haytham Qarajouli	(Austria) GRT Grasser Racing Team	44	50	47	37	31			0
–	(Belgium) Baptiste Moulin	(Austria) GRT Grasser Racing Team		50	47	37		Ret		0
–	(Israel) Artem Petrov	(Austria) GRT Grasser Racing Team						Ret		0
–	(Italy) Marco Cassarà (United States) Phillippe Denes	(Italy) BMW Italia Ceccato Racing						31		0
–	(Bahrain) Isa Al Khalifa (Croatia) Martin Kodrić (United Kingdom) Lewis Williamson	(Bahrain) 2 Seas Motorsport	33	20	53	42				0
–	(United Kingdom) Frank Bird	(Bahrain) 2 Seas Motorsport		20	53	42				0
–	(United States) Connor De Phillippi (Brazil) Pedro Ebrahim	(United Kingdom) Century Motorsport		49	44	33				0
–	(Denmark) Dennis Lind	(Antigua and Barbuda) HAAS RT		31	26	Ret				0
–	(Denmark) Dennis Lind	(Italy) Imperiale Racing							33	0
–	(United States) Phillippe Denes (Italy) Alberto Di Folco	(Italy) Imperiale Racing							33	0
–	(China) Yifei Ye	(Italy) AF Corse - Francorchamps Motors						34		0
–	(Germany) Marvin Dienst (Austria) Philipp Sager	(Italy) Dinamic GT	35	Ret	Ret	Ret				0
–	(United Kingdom) Ben Green (Netherlands) Mex Jansen	(Germany) Walkenhorst Racing	36	23	31	Ret	42	Ret	WD	0
–	(United Kingdom) Tim Creswick	(Germany) Walkenhorst Racing	36	23	31	Ret	42	Ret		0
–	(United States) Bijoy Garg	(Germany) Walkenhorst Racing		23	31	Ret				0
–	(Hong Kong) David Pun	(China) Uno Racing Team with Landgraf		55	51	36				0
–	(Hong Kong) David Pun	(Germany) Walkenhorst Racing							WD	0
–	(Netherlands) Indy Dontje (Hong Kong) "Rio" (Macau) Kevin Tse	(China) Uno Racing Team with Landgraf		55	51	36				0
–	(United Kingdom) Alex Buncombe (United Kingdom) Chris Buncombe (United Kingdom) Josh Caygill (United Kingdom) Jann Mardenborough	(United Kingdom) Team RJN		36	41	41				0
–	(Austria) Christopher Zöchling	(Italy) Dinamic GT	42	Ret	Ret	Ret				0
–	(Spain) Daniel Juncadella (Denmark) Frederik Vesti	(Hong Kong) Mercedes-AMG Team GruppeM Racing		12	36	Ret				0
–	(France) Simon Gachet	(Antigua and Barbuda) HAAS RT		31	26	Ret				0
–	(France) Simon Gachet	(France) CSA Racing							Ret	0
–	(Belgium) Jan Heylen	(Antigua and Barbuda) HAAS RT		31	26	Ret				0
–	(Australia) Calan Williams	OQ by Oman Racing		43	34	Ret				0
–	(Malaysia) Prince Jefri Ibrahim (Austria) Martin Konrad (Australia) Jordan Love (United Kingdom) Alexander Sims	(Hong Kong) Triple Eight JMR		52†	Ret	Ret				0
–	(France) Kévin Estre	(Chinese Taipei) HubAuto Racing		59†	Ret	Ret				0
–	(France) Kévin Estre	(France) Schumacher CLRT						Ret		0
–	(France) Patrick Pilet (Belgium) Laurens Vanthoor	(Chinese Taipei) HubAuto Racing		59†	Ret	Ret				0
–	(New Zealand) Earl Bamber (Malaysia) Adrian D'Silva (New Zealand) Brendon Leitch (China) Kerong Li	(New Zealand) Earl Bamber Motorsport		Ret	Ret	Ret				0
–	(Lithuania) Julius Adomavičius (Belgium) Olivier Bertels (Belgium) Armand Fumal (Australia) Brad Schumacher	(Antigua and Barbuda) HAAS RT		Ret	Ret	Ret				0
–	(Australia) Broc Feeney	(Oman) AlManar Racing by GetSpeed						Ret		0
–	(United Kingdom) Ben Barker	(Germany) Proton Competition							Ret	0
–	(Netherlands) Robin Frijns (Netherlands) Maxime Oosten	(Germany) ROWE Racing						WD		0
Pos.	Drivers	Team	LEC (France)	SPA (Belgium)			NÜR (Germany)	MNZ (Italy)	JED (Saudi Arabia)	Points
Pos.	Drivers	Team	LEC (France)	6hrs	12hrs	24hrs	NÜR (Germany)	MNZ (Italy)	JED (Saudi Arabia)	Points

Key
Colour	Result
Gold	Race winner
Silver	2nd place
Bronze	3rd place
Green	Points finish
Blue	Non-points finish
Blue	Non-classified finish (NC)
Purple	Did not finish (Ret)
Black	Disqualified (DSQ)
Black	Excluded (EX)
White	Did not start (DNS)
White	Race cancelled (C)
White	Withdrew (WD)
Blank	Did not participate

^{P} – Pole
^{F} – Fastest Lap

Notes:

- † – Entry did not finish the race but was classified, as it completed more than 75% of the race distance.

==== Gold Cup ====
Pos.	Drivers	Team	LEC (France)	SPA (Belgium)			NÜR (Germany)	MNZ (Italy)	JED (Saudi Arabia)	Points
Pos.	Drivers	Team	LEC (France)	6hrs	12hrs	24hrs	NÜR (Germany)	MNZ (Italy)	JED (Saudi Arabia)	Points
1	(France) Paul Evrard (Belgium) Gilles Magnus (France) Jim Pla	(France) Saintéloc Racing	13	37	21	15	15^{P}	26	18	140
2	(Oman) Al Faisal Al Zubair (Austria) Dominik Baumann	(Oman) AlManar Racing by GetSpeed	15^{PF}	30	23	7	17	Ret	20	104
2	(Canada) Mikaël Grenier	(Oman) AlManar Racing by GetSpeed	15^{PF}	30	23	7	17		20	104
3	(Italy) Michele Beretta (India) Arjun Maini (Germany) Jusuf Owega	(Germany) Haupt Racing Team	47	47	40	17	19	22	34	95
4	(France) Arthur Rougier	(France) CSA Racing	18	51	54†	Ret	21^{F}	33	Ret^{P}	48
5	(France) Romain Carton	(France) CSA Racing	18	51	54†	Ret	21^{F}	33		47
6	(Switzerland) Philip Ellis	(Oman) AlManar Racing by GetSpeed		30	23	7				43
7	(Italy) Lorenzo Ferrari (Italy) Leonardo Moncini (Italy) Lorenzo Patrese	(Germany) Tresor Attempto Racing	40	48	46	30^{PF}	23	Ret	Ret	43
8	(Bahrain) Isa Al Khalifa (Croatia) Martin Kodrić (United Kingdom) Lewis Williamson	(Bahrain) 2 Seas Motorsport	33	20	53	42				39
9	(Belgium) Ugo de Wilde	(France) Saintéloc Racing		37	21	15				38
10	(Netherlands) Job van Uitert	(Belgium) Comtoyou Racing						32^{P}	35	31
11	(United Kingdom) Frank Bird	(Bahrain) 2 Seas Motorsport		20	53	42				27
12	(United Kingdom) Hugo Cook	(France) CSA Racing					21^{F}	33	Ret^{P}	25
13	(France) Adam Eteki	(France) CSA Racing	18	51	54†	Ret				23
14	(Netherlands) Glenn van Berlo	(Germany) Tresor Attempto Racing		48	46	30^{PF}				23
15	(United Kingdom) Charles Clark (Belgium) Matisse Lismont	(Belgium) Comtoyou Racing						32^{P}		16
16	(United Kingdom) James Jakes (Netherlands) Niels Koolen	(Belgium) Comtoyou Racing							35	15
17	(France) Steven Palette	(France) CSA Racing		51	54†	Ret				8
18	(France) Simon Gachet	(France) CSA Racing							Ret^{P}	1
-	(Australia) Broc Feeney	(Oman) AlManar Racing by GetSpeed						Ret		0
Pos.	Drivers	Team	LEC (France)	SPA (Belgium)			NÜR (Germany)	MNZ (Italy)	JED (Saudi Arabia)	Points
Pos.	Drivers	Team	LEC (France)	6hrs	12hrs	24hrs	NÜR (Germany)	MNZ (Italy)	JED (Saudi Arabia)	Points

==== Silver Cup ====
Pos.	Drivers	Team	LEC (France)	SPA (Belgium)			NÜR (Germany)	MNZ (Italy)	JED (Saudi Arabia)	Points
Pos.	Drivers	Team	LEC (France)	6hrs	12hrs	24hrs	NÜR (Germany)	MNZ (Italy)	JED (Saudi Arabia)	Points
1	(Netherlands) "Daan Arrow" (Netherlands) Colin Caresani (Thailand) Tanart Sathienthirakul	(United States) Winward Racing	19^{F}	14	19	28^{PF}	25^{F}	9		102
2	(Argentina) Ezequiel Pérez Companc	(Argentina) Madpanda Motorsport	22^{P}	19	43	31	32	29	13^{PF}	93
3	(France) César Gazeau (France) Aurélien Panis	(Belgium) Boutsen VDS	21	27	32	40	16^{P}	Ret	15	81
4	(Netherlands) Jop Rappange	(Italy) Dinamic GT	42	21	24	27	27	28	26	79
5	(United States) Anthony Bartone (United Kingdom) James Kell (Switzerland) Yannick Mettler	(Germany) GetSpeed	39	33	14	25	41	35	30	76
6	(France) Théo Nouet	(Italy) Dinamic GT		21	24	27	27	28	26	73
7	(United States) Roee Meyuhas	(Belgium) Boutsen VDS	21	27	32	40	16^{P}	Ret		57
8	(Belgium) Matisse Lismont	(Belgium) Comtoyou Racing	41	8	45	32	45		23	56
9	(Belgium) Kobe Pauwels	(France) Saintéloc Racing						15	13^{PF}	52
10	(Germany) Patrick Assenheimer	(Argentina) Madpanda Motorsport	22^{P}	19	43	31	32			49
11	(United Kingdom) Lorcan Hanafin (France) Romain Leroux (France) Maxime Robin	(Germany) Walkenhorst Racing	34	26	30	44†	Ret	19	31	49
12	(Belgium) Nicolas Baert (Denmark) Sebastian Øgaard	(Belgium) Comtoyou Racing	46	Ret	Ret	Ret	38	15	23	47
13	(United Kingdom) Aaron Walker	(Germany) GetSpeed		33	14	25				40
14	(United Kingdom) Charles Clark (Belgium) Sam Dejonghe	(Belgium) Comtoyou Racing	41	8	45	32	45			37
15	(Norway) Marius Nakken	(Italy) Dinamic GT	42	21	24	27				37
16	(Switzerland) Lucas Légeret	(France) Saintéloc Racing							13^{PF}	34
17	(Belgium) Esteban Muth	(Belgium) Comtoyou Racing	46	Ret	Ret	Ret	38		15	34
18	(Finland) Axel Blom	(Italy) Dinamic GT		21	24	27				31
19	(Portugal) Guilherme Oliveira	(Italy) Dinamic GT					27	28		27
20	(Italy) Mateo Llarena	(Austria) GRT Grasser Racing Team	44	50	47	37	31	Ret^{PF}	Ret	27
21	(Kuwait) Haytham Qarajouli	(Austria) GRT Grasser Racing Team	44	50	47	37	31			26
22	(Netherlands) Xavier Maassen	(Belgium) Comtoyou Racing		8	45	32				25
23	(Poland) Karol Basz (Switzerland) Alain Valente	(Argentina) Madpanda Motorsport		19	43	31				23
24	(Ukraine) Ivan Klymenko (France) Alban Varutti	(France) Saintéloc Racing	48†	53	48	34		29		21
25	(Italy) Felice Jelmini	(Italy) Dinamic GT							26	15
26	(United Kingdom) Hugo Cook	(Austria) GRT Grasser Racing Team	44	50	47	37				14
27	(France) Sébastien Baud	(Belgium) Boutsen VDS		27	32	40				13
28	(France) Loris Cabirou	(Austria) GRT Grasser Racing Team					31		Ret	12
29	(Belgium) Baptiste Moulin	(Austria) GRT Grasser Racing Team		50	47	37		Ret^{PF}		11
30	(Germany) Tom Kalender	(Argentina) Madpanda Motorsport					32			10
31	(Norway) Marcus Påverud (Belgium) Gilles Stadsbader	(France) Saintéloc Racing		53	48	34				10
32	(Austria) Christopher Zöchling	(Italy) Dinamic GT	42							6
33	(Belgium) Ugo de Wilde	(France) Saintéloc Racing	48†							1
34	(Israel) Artem Petrov	(Austria) GRT Grasser Racing Team						Ret^{PF}		1
–	(France) Erwan Bastard	(Belgium) Comtoyou Racing		Ret	Ret	Ret				0
–	(Spain) Isaac Tutumlu	(Austria) GRT Grasser Racing Team							Ret	0
Pos.	Drivers	Team	LEC (France)	SPA (Belgium)			NÜR (Germany)	MNZ (Italy)	JED (Saudi Arabia)	Points
Pos.	Drivers	Team	LEC (France)	6hrs	12hrs	24hrs	NÜR (Germany)	MNZ (Italy)	JED (Saudi Arabia)	Points

==== Bronze Cup ====
Pos.	Drivers	Team	LEC (France)	SPA (Belgium)			NÜR (Germany)	MNZ (Italy)	JED (Saudi Arabia)	Points
Pos.	Drivers	Team	LEC (France)	6hrs	12hrs	24hrs	NÜR (Germany)	MNZ (Italy)	JED (Saudi Arabia)	Points
1	(Italy) Eddie Cheever III (United Kingdom) Chris Froggatt (Hong Kong) Jonathan Hui	(United Kingdom) Sky – Tempesta Racing	25	4	12	16	33	12	28	74
2	(Italy) Andrea Bertolini (Belgium) Jef Machiels (Belgium) Louis Machiels	(Italy) AF Corse	23	9	2	13^{F}	40	Ret	25	72
3	(United States) Dustin Blattner (Germany) Dennis Marschall	(Germany) Rutronik Racing	31	Ret	Ret	Ret	22^{P}	17	17	71
4	(Oman) Ahmad Al Harthy (United Kingdom) Sam De Haan (Germany) Jens Klingmann	OQ by Oman Racing	27	43	34	Ret	35	1	19	64
5	(Netherlands) Loek Hartog	(Germany) Rutronik Racing	31	Ret	Ret	Ret	22^{P}		17	61
6	(Austria) Max Hofer; Andrey Mukovoz	(Germany) Tresor Attempto Racing	Ret	29	3	10	Ret	11	Ret	53
7	(Italy) Tommaso Mosca	(Italy) AF Corse		9	2	13^{F}				39
8	(Italy) David Fumanelli (Switzerland) Nicolò Rosi (Italy) Niccolò Schirò	(Switzerland) Kessel Racing	20	39	27	43†		21	Ret	39
9	(Luxembourg) Dylan Pereira	(Germany) Tresor Attempto Racing	Ret	29	3	10	Ret		Ret	38
9	(Kyrgyzstan) Alexey Nesov	(Germany) Tresor Attempto Racing		29	3	10				38
10	(Belgium) John de Wilde	(Belgium) Comtoyou Racing	24	18	33	20	Ret	30		38
11	(Belgium) Kobe Pauwels (Netherlands) Job van Uitert	(Belgium) Comtoyou Racing	24	18	33	20	Ret			34
11	(United Kingdom) Darren Leung (United Kingdom) Toby Sowery	(United Kingdom) Century Motorsport	49†	49	44	33	30	7	Ret	32
13	(France) Lilou Wadoux	(United Kingdom) Sky – Tempesta Racing		4	12	16				31
14	(United Kingdom) Jake Dennis	(United Kingdom) Century Motorsport	49†				30	7	Ret	30
15	(Finland) Patrick Kujala (Luxembourg) Gabriel Rindone (United Kingdom) Casper Stevenson	(United Kingdom) Barwell Motorsport	37	34	18	14	39	37	29	30
16	(United Kingdom) Till Bechtolsheimer (United Kingdom) Sandy Mitchell	(United Kingdom) Barwell Motorsport	29	42	50	35	29^{F}	Ret	32	24
17	(Italy) Mattia Michelotto	(United Kingdom) Barwell Motorsport		34	18	14				23
18	(Germany) Ralf Bohn (Germany) Robert Renauer (Netherlands) Morris Schuring	(Germany) Herberth Motorsport	28	32	Ret	Ret	DNS	Ret	27	21
19	(Denmark) Bastian Buus (Germany) Patrick Kolb	(Germany) Lionspeed GP	30				28	Ret	Ret	20
20	(France) Antoine Doquin	(United Kingdom) Barwell Motorsport	29	42	50	35	29^{F}	Ret		20
21	(Switzerland) Alexander Fach	(Germany) Lionspeed x Herberth		41	28	22				20
21	(Switzerland) Alexander Fach	(Germany) Rutronik Racing						17		20
22	(Netherlands) Dante Rappange	(Belgium) Comtoyou Racing		18	33	20				19
23	(Denmark) Nicolai Kjærgaard (United Kingdom) Mark Sansom	(United Kingdom) Garage 59	43	56	52	38	43	Ret	22	19
23	(United Kingdom) James Baldwin	(United Kingdom) Garage 59		56	52	38		Ret	22	19
24	(Netherlands) Michael Verhagen	(Germany) Lionspeed GP					28	Ret	Ret	18
25	(United Kingdom) Rob Bell (United Kingdom) Mark Radcliffe	(United Kingdom) Optimum Motorsport	Ret	25	37	21		36		14
25	(Spain) Fran Rueda	(United Kingdom) Optimum Motorsport		25	37	21		36		14
26	(United Kingdom) Ollie Millroy	(United Kingdom) Optimum Motorsport	Ret	25	37	21				13
27	(Monaco) Louis Prette (United Kingdom) Adam Smalley	(United Kingdom) Garage 59	38^{P}	46	42	39^{P}	34	Ret		11
28	(United Kingdom) Matt Bell (United Kingdom) John Hartshorne (United Kingdom) Ben Tuck	(Switzerland) Kessel Racing	26^{F}	54	49	45†				10
29	(Hong Kong) Antares Au (Belgium) Alessio Picariello (Estonia) Martin Rump	(Germany) Lionspeed x Herberth		41	28	22				10
30	(Portugal) Miguel Ramos	(United Kingdom) Garage 59		46	42	39^{P}	34	Ret		10
31	(Germany) Felipe Fernández Laser (South Africa) David Perel	(Germany) Rinaldi Racing	32	Ret	Ret	Ret	36	25	Ret	10
32	(United Kingdom) Tim Creswick (United Kingdom) Ben Green (Netherlands) Mex Jansen	(Germany) Walkenhorst Racing	36	23	31	Ret	42	Ret		9
32	(United States) Bijoy Garg	(Germany) Walkenhorst Racing		23	31	Ret				9
33	(Italy) Daniele Di Amato	(Switzerland) Kessel Racing		39	27	43†				6
34	(Germany) Christian Hook	(Germany) Rinaldi Racing	32	Ret	Ret	Ret		25	Ret	6
35	(United Kingdom) Ricky Collard	(United Kingdom) Barwell Motorsport		42	50	35			32	5
36	(United Kingdom) Shaun Balfe (United Kingdom) Ben Barnicoat (United Kingdom) Sam Neary (Netherlands) Ruben del Sarte	(United Kingdom) Optimum Motorsport		45	39	23				4
37	(United Kingdom) James Jakes (Netherlands) Niels Koolen	(Belgium) Comtoyou Racing						30		4
38	(Germany) Klaus Abbelen	(Germany) Rinaldi Racing					36			4
39	(Germany) Alfred Renauer	(Germany) Herberth Motorsport		32	Ret	Ret				3
40	(Germany) Florian Spengler	(Germany) Lionspeed GP	30							2
41	(Italy) Marco Cassarà (United States) Phillippe Denes (Italy) Felice Jelmini	(Italy) BMW Italia Ceccato Racing						31		2
42	(United States) Connor De Phillippi (Brazil) Pedro Ebrahim	(United Kingdom) Century Motorsport		49	44	33				2
43	(France) Michael Blanchemain (France) Alban Varutti (Belgium) Ugo de Wilde	(France) Saintéloc Racing					37			2
44	(Australia) Calan Williams	OQ by Oman Racing		43	34	Ret				1
45	(United Kingdom) James Cottingham	(United Kingdom) Garage 59	38^{P}							1
46	(Germany) Marvin Kirchhöfer	(United Kingdom) Garage 59		46	42	39^{P}				1
–	(United Kingdom) Lewis Proctor	(United Kingdom) Garage 59	43							0
–	(United Kingdom) Chris Salkeld	(United Kingdom) Garage 59		56	52	38	43			0
–	(Germany) Marvin Dienst (Portugal) Guilherme Oliveira (Austria) Philipp Sager	(Italy) Dinamic GT	35	Ret	Ret	Ret				0
–	(United States) Chandler Hull	(Switzerland) Kessel Racing		54	49	45†				0
–	(Italy) Fabrizio Crestani	(Germany) Rinaldi Racing		Ret	Ret	Ret				0
–	(Canada) Zacharie Robichon	(Germany) Rutronik Racing		Ret	Ret	Ret				0
–	(Austria) Christopher Zöchling	(Italy) Dinamic GT		Ret	Ret	Ret				0
Pos.	Drivers	Team	LEC (France)	SPA (Belgium)			NÜR (Germany)	MNZ (Italy)	JED (Saudi Arabia)	Points
Pos.	Drivers	Team	LEC (France)	6hrs	12hrs	24hrs	NÜR (Germany)	MNZ (Italy)	JED (Saudi Arabia)	Points

=== Teams' Championship ===
==== Overall ====
Pos.	Team	LEC (France)	SPA (Belgium)			NÜR (Germany)	MNZ (Italy)	JED (Saudi Arabia)	Points
Pos.	Team	LEC (France)	6hrs	12hrs	24hrs	NÜR (Germany)	MNZ (Italy)	JED (Saudi Arabia)	Points
1	(Germany) ROWE Racing	1							25
2	(Italy) Iron Lynx	2							19
3	(Germany) Mercedes-AMG Team GetSpeed	3							15
4	(Belgium) Team WRT	4							12
5	(Germany) Rutronik Racing	5							10
6	(Germany) Tresor Attempto Racing	6							8
7	(Belgium) Comtoyou Racing	7							6
8	(Lithuania) Pure Rxcing	8							4
9	(Italy) AF Corse - Francorchamps Motors	9							2
10	(Germany) Proton Competition	10							1

==== Gold Cup ====
Pos.	Team	LEC (France)	SPA (Belgium)			NÜR (Germany)	MNZ (Italy)	JED (Saudi Arabia)	Points
Pos.	Team	LEC (France)	6hrs	12hrs	24hrs	NÜR (Germany)	MNZ (Italy)	JED (Saudi Arabia)	Points
1	(France) Saintéloc Racing	13							25
2	(Oman) AlManar Racing by GetSpeed	15							19
3	(France) CSA Racing	18							15
4	(Bahrain) 2 Seas Motorsport	33							12
5	(Germany) Tresor Attempto Racing	40							10
6	(Germany) Haupt Racing Team	47							8
7	(United Kingdom) Optimum Motorsport	Ret							0

==== Silver Cup ====
Pos.	Team	LEC (France)	SPA (Belgium)			NÜR (Germany)	MNZ (Italy)	JED (Saudi Arabia)	Points
Pos.	Team	LEC (France)	6hrs	12hrs	24hrs	NÜR (Germany)	MNZ (Italy)	JED (Saudi Arabia)	Points
1	(United States) Winward Racing	19							25
2	(Belgium) Boutsen VDS	21							18
3	(Argentina) Madpanda Motorsport	22							16
4	(Germany) Walkenhorst Racing	34							12
5	(Germany) GetSpeed	39							10
6	(Belgium) Comtoyou Racing	41							8
7	(Italy) Dinamic GT	42							6
8	(Austria) GRT Grasser Racing Team	44							4
9	(France) Saintéloc Racing	48†							2

==== Bronze Cup ====
Pos.	Team	LEC (France)	SPA (Belgium)			NÜR (Germany)	MNZ (Italy)	JED (Saudi Arabia)	Points
Pos.	Team	LEC (France)	6hrs	12hrs	24hrs	NÜR (Germany)	MNZ (Italy)	JED (Saudi Arabia)	Points
1	(Switzerland) Kessel Racing	20							25
2	(Italy) AF Corse	23							18
3	(Belgium) Comtoyou Racing	24							15
4	(United Kingdom) Sky – Tempesta Racing	25							12
5	OQ by Oman Racing	27							10
6	(Germany) Herberth Motorsport	28							8
7	(United Kingdom) Barwell Motorsport	29							6
8	(Germany) Lionspeed GP	30							4
9	(Germany) Rutronik Racing	31							2
10	(Germany) Rinaldi Racing	32							1
11	(United Kingdom) Garage 59	38							1
–	(Italy) Dinamic GT	35							0
–	(Germany) Walkenhorst Racing	36							0
–	(United Kingdom) Century Motorsport	49†							0
–	(Germany) Tresor Attempto Racing	Ret							–

== See also ==
- 2024 British GT Championship
- 2024 GT World Challenge Europe
- 2024 GT World Challenge Europe Sprint Cup
- 2024 GT World Challenge Asia
- 2024 GT World Challenge America
- 2024 GT World Challenge Australia
- 2024 Intercontinental GT Challenge
