= 2019 24H Middle East Series =

Motor racing competition

The 2019 24H Middle East Series was the first season of the 24H Middle East Series, presented by Creventic. The races are contested with GT3-spec cars, GT4-spec cars, 24H-Specials cars, along with LMP2 cars, LMP3 cars and Group CN prototype cars.

== Calendar ==
Round	Event	Circuit	Location	Date
1	6H Dubai	(United Arab Emirates) Dubai Autodrome	Dubai, United Arab Emirates	25–26 January 2019
2	4H Abu Dhabi	(United Arab Emirates) Yas Marina Circuit	Abu Dhabi, United Arab Emirates	1–2 February 2019
3	10H Dubai	(United Arab Emirates) Dubai Autodrome	Dubai, United Arab Emirates	7 February 2019

== Teams and drivers ==
Team	Car	No.	Drivers	Rounds
PX
(Italy) Avelon Formula	Wolf GB08 Tornado	45	(Italy) Ivan Bellarosa	1–2
(Italy) Avelon Formula	Wolf GB08 Tornado	45	(Italy) Guglielmo Belotti	1–2
(Italy) Avelon Formula	Wolf GB08 Tornado	45	(Italy) Angelo Negro	1
SPX
(Belgium) Speed Lover	Porsche 991 GT3 Cup MR	78	(Lebanon) Yusif Bassil	2
(Belgium) Speed Lover	Porsche 991 GT3 Cup MR	78	(Oman) Al Faisal Al Zubair	2
TCR
(Hungary) Zengő Motorsport	CUPRA León TCR	8	(Hungary) Zoltán Zengő	All
(Hungary) Zengő Motorsport	CUPRA León TCR	8	(Hungary) Csaba Tóth	1, 3
(Hungary) Zengő Motorsport	CUPRA León TCR	8	(Hungary) Tamás Tenke	2
(Hungary) Zengő Motorsport	CUPRA León TCR	10	(Hungary) Zoltán Zengő	2
(Hungary) Zengő Motorsport	CUPRA León TCR	10	(Hungary) Csaba Tóth	2
(Hungary) Zengő Motorsport	CUPRA León TCR	10	(Hungary) Tamás Horváth	3
(Hungary) Zengő Motorsport	CUPRA León TCR	10	(Hungary) Gábor Kismarty-Lechner	3
(United Kingdom) J W BIRD Motorsport	Volkswagen Golf GTI TCR	21	(United Kingdom) Paul Dehadray	2
(United Kingdom) J W BIRD Motorsport	Volkswagen Golf GTI TCR	21	(United Kingdom) Kieran Griffin	2
(Germany) ALL-INKL.COM Münnich Motorsport	Honda Civic Type R TCR (FK8)	77	(Germany) René Münnich	All
(Germany) ALL-INKL.COM Münnich Motorsport	Honda Civic Type R TCR (FK8)	77	(Netherlands) Luc Breukers	All
(Netherlands) Red Camel-Jordans.nl	CUPRA León TCR	101	(Netherlands) Luc Breukers	All
(Netherlands) Red Camel-Jordans.nl	CUPRA León TCR	101	(Lebanon) Yusif Bassil	1, 3
(Netherlands) Red Camel-Jordans.nl	CUPRA León TCR	101	(Netherlands) Ivo Breukers	2–3

== Race results ==
Bold indicates overall winner.

Classes	(United Arab Emirates) 6H Dubai	(United Arab Emirates) 4H Abu Dhabi	(United Arab Emirates) 10H Dubai
PX Winners	**(Italy) No. 45 Avelon Formula**	**(Italy) No. 45 Avelon Formula**	No Entries
PX Winners	**(Italy) Ivan Bellarosa** **(Italy) Guglielmo Belotti** **(Italy) Angelo Negro**	**(Italy) Ivan Bellarosa** **(Italy) Guglielmo Belotti**	No Entries
SPX Winners	No Entries	(Belgium) No. 78 Speed Lover	No Entries
SPX Winners	No Entries	(Lebanon) Yusif Bassil (Oman) Al Faisal Al Zubair	No Entries
TCR Winners	(Hungary) No. 8 Zengő Motorsport	(Netherlands) No. 101 Red Camel-Jordans.nl	**(Netherlands) No. 101 Red Camel-Jordans.nl**
TCR Winners	(Hungary) Csaba Tóth (Hungary) Zoltán Zengő	(Netherlands) Ivo Breukers (Netherlands) Luc Breukers	**(Lebanon) Yusif Bassil** **(Netherlands) Ivo Breukers** **(Netherlands) Luc Breukers**
