= Bahrain Darts Masters =

Tournament information
- Dates: January
- Venue: Bahrain International Circuit
- Location: Sakhir, Bahrain
- Organisation(s): Professional Darts Corporation (PDC)
- Format: Legs

The Bahrain Darts Masters is a professional darts tournament run by the Professional Darts Corporation that is held in Bahrain.

- 2023 Bahrain Darts Masters
- 2024 Bahrain Darts Masters
- 2025 Bahrain Darts Masters
- 2026 Bahrain Darts Masters
