= Porsche Sprint Challenge Middle East =

Motor racing series

- Category: One-make racing by Porsche
- Country: Middle East
- Inaugural season: 2009
- Folded: 2023
- Constructors: Porsche
- Tyre suppliers: Michelin
- Last Drivers' champion: (Israel) Ariel Levi
- Last Teams' champion: (Germany) Huber Racing
- Official website: Porsche Sprint Challenge Middle East official website

The Porsche Sprint Challenge Middle East was the Middle East motor racing series based on the famous Porsche 911 GT3 Cup launched in 2009.

Due to summer temperatures in the Middle East, the races are held in the winter to have regular temperatures for cars, tires, teams and drivers.

Each season starts at the end of a year (in November) and finishes (in March) the next year.

For the 2023–24 season it was replaced with Porsche Carrera Cup Middle East.

== Champions ==
Season	Champion	Team Champion	Car Model
2009–10	(Saudi Arabia) Abdulaziz bin Turki al Faisal	(Saudi Arabia) Al Faisal Lechner Racing	Porsche 911 GT3 Cup Type 997
2010–11	(Bahrain) Salman Al-Khalifa	Team Bahrain	Porsche 911 GT3 Cup Type 997
2011–12	(Saudi Arabia) Abdulaziz bin Turki al Faisal	(Saudi Arabia) Saudi Falcons	Porsche 911 GT3 Cup Type 997
2012–13	(Austria) Clemens Schmid	(United Arab Emirates) Al Nabooda Racing	Porsche 911 GT3 Cup Type 991
2013–14	(Kuwait) Zaid Ashkanani	(United Arab Emirates) Al Nabooda Racing	Porsche 911 GT3 Cup Type 991
2014–15	(Austria) Clemens Schmid	(United Arab Emirates) SKY DIVE Dubai Falcons	Porsche 911 GT3 Cup Type 991
2015–16	(Switzerland) Jeffrey Schmidt	(United Arab Emirates) Al Nabooda Racing	Porsche 911 GT3 Cup Type 991
2016–17	(Republic of Ireland) Ryan Cullen	(Qatar) Frijns Structural Steel ME	Porsche 911 GT3 Cup Type 991
2017–18	(Oman) Al Faisal Al Zubair	(Qatar) Frijns Structural Steel ME	Porsche 911 GT3 Cup Type 991
2018–19	(Oman) Al Faisal Al Zubair	Team Oman	Porsche 911 GT3 Cup Type 991
2019–20	(Germany) Leon Köhler	(Netherlands) GP Elite	Porsche 911 GT3 Cup Type 991
2021–22	(Saudi Arabia) Fahad Algosaibi	(Saudi Arabia) Saudi Racing	Porsche 911 GT3 Cup Type 991
2022–23	(Israel) Ariel Levi	(Germany) Huber Racing	Porsche 911 GT3 Cup Type 991
