= Gustav Burton =

British racing driver (born 2002)

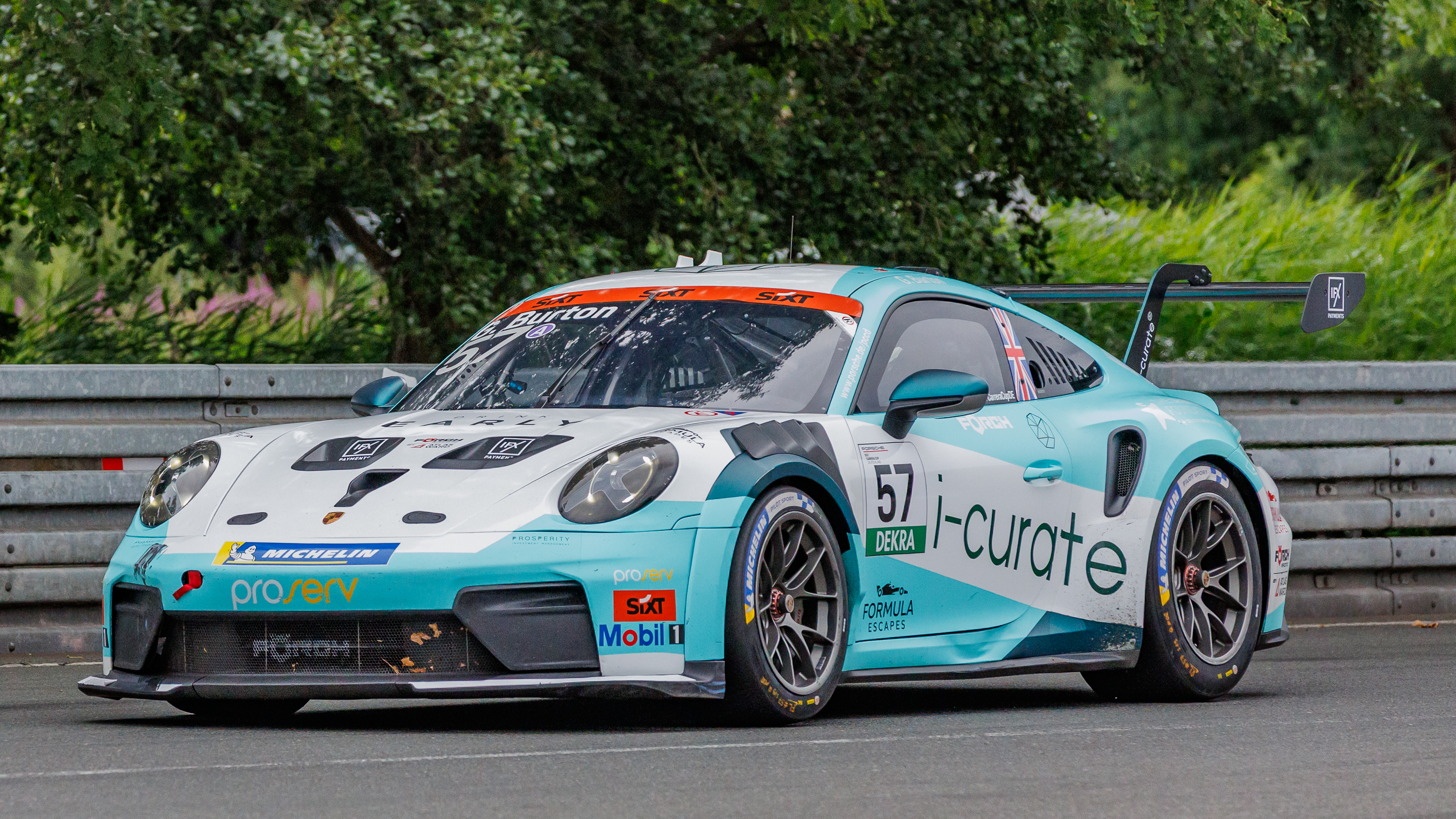
- Burton competing in the 2026 Porsche Carrera Cup Germany
- Nationality: (United Kingdom) British (Denmark) Danish via dual nationality
- Born: Gustav Michael Burton; 25 December 2002 (age 23) Southend-on-Sea, Essex, United Kingdom

Porsche Supercup career
- Debut season: 2023
- Current team: GP Elite
- Categorisation: FIA Silver
- Car number: 26
- Former teams: Century Motorsport, Fach Auto Tech
- Starts: 25
- Wins: 1
- Podiums: 1
- Poles: 0
- Fastest laps: 0
- Best finish: 7th in 2026

Championship titles
- 2018 2021: Renault Clio Cup UK Junior; British GT Championship - GT4 Silver

Gustav Michael Burton (born 25 December 2002) is a British-Danish racing driver who most recently competed in the Porsche Supercup for GP Elite.

== Career ==
=== Ginetta Junior Championship ===
==== 2018 ====
In 2018, Burton signed with Douglas Motorsport to compete in select rounds of the 2018 Ginetta Junior Championship. In his fifteen starts, he would have a best finish of sixth at Brands Hatch.

==== 2019 ====
Burton returned to the championship for the full 2019 season, once again competing for Douglas Motorsport. He would have more success, finishing on the podium four times throughout the season.

=== Ginetta GT4 Supercup ===
In 2020, Burton moved up to the Ginetta GT4 Supercup, signing with Century Motorsport for the full season. He would immediately find success, qualifying on pole for the opening race of the season at Donington Park. During race one, Burton dropped back to third behind Will Burns and Tom Hibbert respectively, where he remained until the finish. He would finish on the podium again in race two, this time in second. Burton would finish one step higher in race three and break through to get his maiden win of the season. Following the opening round at Donington, a championship battle between Burton, Burns, and Hibbert was starting to form, with all three drivers finishing on the podium in all three races at Donington. Burton would demonstrate consistency once again in the next round at the Brands Hatch GP Circuit, finishing in second in all three races. Hibbert won races one and two, demoting Burton to third in the championship. Burton would dominate the next two races at Oulton Park, qualifying on pole for race two and winning both races. Burns and Hibbert would have mixed weekends by comparison, with both getting onto the podium in race one, but finishing eight and fourth in race two respectively. Burton would get another pole in race one at Thruxton, but would retire in the race and lose points to Burns and Hibbert. In the next four races at Thruxton and Croft, Burton finished in third in every race. Burns extended his gap to Burton with two wins and a second place at Croft, while Burton only managed a ninth place finish in race three at Croft. The penultimate round at Snetterton saw mixed results for Burton, with a retirement in race one, but a third and a win in races two and three. Going into the final two races of the season at Brands Hatch, Burton was 43 points behind Burns in first. In race one, Burton finished on the podium in second, while Burns finished in fourth. Burton was able to win race two with Burns finishing behind in second. However, this was not enough for Burton to win the championship, and thus finished second to Burns.

=== British GT Championship ===
==== 2021 ====
Following their rivalry in the previous year's Ginetta GT4 Supercup, Burton and Will Burns joined each other to compete in the 2021 British GT Championship driving for Century Motorsport in the GT4 Silver class. The pair were successful in their first outing, qualifying on pole at Brands Hatch and going on to win the race. Burton and Burns would have four successive podiums in the next four races, including a win at Donington Park. In race two the pair finished in fifth, which was their only non-podium finish thus far in the season. They would have a dominant performance in the next round at Oulton Park, winning both races. This gave Burton and Burns a comfortable lead in the championship. In the final round at Donington, the pair would seal the championship with a third place finish.

=== Porsche Carrera Cup Great Britain ===
==== 2022 ====
Following his maiden championship in British GT, Burton switched over to the Porsche Carrera Cup Great Britain for 2022, staying with Century Motorsport to compete in the Pro category. He would have a up and down first weekend at Donington Park, qualifying on pole for both races, but finishing fourth in race one, and retiring in race two. The next two rounds at Brands Hatch and Oulton Park were similar for Burton, with two points finishes in the Brands Hatch races, but no points in the Oulton races. He would qualify on pole for the next race at Knockhill, and would go on to convert it into his maiden win in the championship. For the rest of the season, Burton would score points in all of the remaining races, finish on the podium four times, as well as win a second race at Thruxton. He would finish fourth in the championship.

==== 2023 ====
For the 2023 season, Burton rejoined Century Motorsport for a partial schedule as he would be competing full-time in the 2023 Porsche Supercup. In the first round at Donington Park, Burton would finish on the podium in both races. However, the next round at Brands Hatch was not successful for Burton, with a non-points finish in eleventh for race one, and a retirement in race two. Mid-way through the season, Burton switched teams to Joe Tandy Racing, and would drive for them starting at the Knockhill round. He would immediately find success, qualifying on pole position for race one and going on to win the race. A retirement in race two would conclude a mixed weekend.

== Racing record ==
=== Racing career summary ===
Season	Series	Team	Races	Wins	Poles	F/Laps	Podiums	Points	Position
2017	BRSCC Ford Fiesta Junior Championship	N/A	?	?	?	?	?	216	11th
2017	Renault Clio Cup UK Junior	JamSport Racing	6	0	0	0	2	132	5th
2018	Renault Clio Cup UK Junior	N/A	4	2	2	2	4	93	**1st**
2018	Ginetta Junior Championship	Douglas Motorsport	15	0	0	1	0	108	19th
2018	Ginetta Junior Winter Championship	N/A	3	0	2	0	1	73	4th
2019	Ginetta Junior Championship	Douglas Motorsport	23	0	0	0	4	412	7th
2020	Ginetta GT4 Supercup - Pro	Century Motorsport	19	5	3	6	16	495	**2nd**
2021	British GT Championship - GT4 Silver	Century Motorsport	9	3	2	1	7	229.5	**1st**
2022	Porsche Carrera Cup Great Britain - Pro	Century Motorsport	15	2	3	1	5	87	4th
2023	Porsche Carrera Cup Great Britain - Pro	Century Motorsport	4	0	0	0	2	45	7th
2023	Porsche Carrera Cup Great Britain - Pro	JTR	6	2	1	1	2	45	7th
2023	Porsche Supercup	Fach Auto Tech	8	0	0	0	0	21	17th
2023	Porsche Carrera Cup Benelux	Richardson Racing	2	0	0	0	0	0	NC†
2024	Porsche Carrera Cup North America - Pro	MDK Motorsports	4	1	1	1	2	62	13th
2024	Porsche Supercup	Century Motorsport	1	0	0	0	0	0	NC†
2025	Porsche Supercup	Proton Huber Competition	8	0	0	0	0	19.5	17th
2026	Porsche Carrera Cup Germany	Forch Racing by Atlas Ward	14	1	1	0	1	71	13th
2026	Porsche Supercup	Team GP Elite	8	0	0	0	1	66	7th

† As Burton was a guest driver, he was ineligible to score championship points.
^{*} Season still in progress.

=== Complete Ginetta Junior Championship results ===
(key) (Races in bold indicate pole position) (Races in italics indicate fastest lap)

Year	Team	1	2	3	4	5	6	7	8	9	10	11	12	13	14	15	16	17	18	19	20	21	22	23	24	25	26	27	DC	Points
2018	Douglas Motorsport	BHI; 1	BHI; 2	DON; 1	DON; 2	DON; 3	THR; 1	THR; 2	OUL; 1	OUL; 2	CRO; 1; 11	CRO; 2; 18	CRO; 3; 12	SNE; 1; 10	SNE; 2 Ret	SNE; 3 Ret	ROC; 1; 13	ROC; 2; 9	ROC; 3; 7	KNO; 1	KNO; 2	SIL; 1; 9	SIL; 2 Ret	SIL; 3; 8	BHGP; 1; 6	BHGP; 2 Ret	BHGP; 1 Ret		19th	108
2019	Douglas Motorsport	BHI; 1; 5	BHI; 2 Ret	DON; 1; 5	DON; 2; 3	DON; 3; 5	THR1; 1; 5	THR1; 2; 5	CRO; 1 C†	CRO; 2; 5	OUL; 1; 22	OUL; 2; 9	SNE; 1; 3	SNE; 2; 5	SNE; 3; 4	SNE; 4; 11	THR2; 1; 13	THR2; 2; 8	THR2; 3; 5	KNO; 1; 10	KNO; 2; 5	KNO; 3; 4	SIL; 1; 6	SIL; 2; 3	SIL; 3; 3	BHGP; 1; 7	BHGP; 2; 6	BHGP; 1 Ret	7th	412

† Race was cancelled.

=== Complete Ginetta GT4 Supercup results ===
(key) (Races in bold indicate pole position) (Races in italics indicate fastest lap)

Year	Team	1	2	3	4	5	6	7	8	9	10	11	12	13	14	15	16	17	18	19	DC	Points
2020	Century Motorsport	**DON**; **1**; 3	DON; 2; 2	DON; 3; 1	BHGP; 1; 2	BHGP; 2; 2	BHGP; 3; 2	OUL; 1; 1	**OUL**; **2**; 1	**THR**; **1** Ret	THR; 2; 3	THR; 3; 3	CRO; 1; 3	CRO; 2; 3	CRO; 3; 9	SNE; 1 Ret	SNE; 2; 3	SNE; 3; 1	BHI; 1; 2	BHI; 2; 1	2nd	495

=== Complete British GT Championship results ===
(key) (Races in bold indicate pole position) (Races in italics indicate fastest lap)

Year	Team	Car	Class	1	2	3	4	5	6	7	8	9	DC	Points
2021	Century Motorsport	BMW M4 GT4	GT4 - Silver	**BRH**; 1	SIL; 2	DON1; 1	SPA; 2	SNE; 1; 2	SNE; 2; 5	OUL; 1; 1	OUL; 2; 1	DON2; 3	1st	229.5

=== Complete Porsche Carrera Cup Great Britain results ===
(key) (Races in bold indicate pole position) (Races in italics indicate fastest lap)

Year	Team	Class	1	2	3	4	5	6	7	8	9	10	11	12	13	14	15	16	Pos.	Points
2022	Century Motorsport	Pro	**DON**; **1**; 4	**DON**; **2** Ret	BHI; 1; 4	BHI; 2; 6	OUL; 1 Ret	OUL; 2 DNS	**KNO**; **1**; 1	KNO; 2; 5	SNE; 1; 2	SNE; 2; 5	THR; 1; 1	THR; 2; 4	SIL; 1; 4	SIL; 2; 2	BHGP; 1; 2	BHGP; 2; 8	4th	87
2023	Century Motorsport	Pro	DNN; 1; 3	DNN; 2; 2	BHI; 1 Ret	BHI; 2; 11	THR; 1	THR; 2	OUL; 1	OUL; 2									7th	45
2023	JTR	Pro									**KNO**; **1**; 1	KNO; 2 Ret	DNGP; 1	DNGP; 2	SIL; 1; 1	SIL; 2; 6	BHGP; 1 Ret	BHGP; 2; 7	7th	45

=== Complete Porsche Carrera Cup Benelux results ===
(key) (Races in bold indicate pole position) (Races in italics indicate fastest lap)

Year	Team	1	2	3	4	5	6	7	8	9	10	11	12	DC	Points
2023	Richardson Racing	SPA; 1	SPA; 2	HOC; 1	HOC; 2	ZAN; 1; 5	ZAN; 2; 20	ASS; 1	ASS; 2	ZOL; 1	ZOL; 2	RBR; 1	RBR; 2	NC†	0

† As Burton was a guest driver, he was ineligible to score championship points.

=== Complete Porsche Supercup results ===
(key) (Races in bold indicate pole position) (Races in italics indicate fastest lap)

Year	Team	1	2	3	4	5	6	7	8	Pos.	Points
2023	Fach Auto Tech	MON; 15	AUT; Ret	GBR; 17	HUN; 13	SPA; 13	ZND; 1; 12	ZND; 2; 14	MNZ; 16	17th	21
2024	Century Motorsport	IMO	MON	AUT	GBR; 13	HUN	SPA	ZND	MNZ	NC†	0
2025	Proton Huber Competition	IMO; 12	MON; 7	CAT; 24	AUT; 18	SPA; 15	HUN; 10	ZND; 16	MNZ; Ret	17th	19.5
2026	Team GP Elite	MON; 3	CAT; 13	AUT; 4	SPA; 10	HUN; 7	ZND; 1; 11	ZND; 2; 7	MNZ; 26	7th	66

^{†}As Burton was a guest driver, he was ineligible for points.
^{*} Season still in progress.

=== Complete Porsche Carrera Cup North America results ===
(key) (Races in bold indicate pole position) (Races in italics indicate fastest lap)

Year	Team	Class	1	2	3	4	5	6	7	8	9	10	11	12	13	14	15	16	Pos.	Points
2024	MDK Motorsports	Pro	SEB; 1; 2	**SEB**; **2**; 1	MIA; 1; 18	MIA; 2; 4	CGV; 1 WD	CGV; 2 WD	WGL; 1	WGL; 2	ROA; 1	ROA; 2	IMS; 1	IMS; 2	ATL; 1	ATL; 2	COT; 1	COT; 2	12th	62

=== Complete Porsche Carrera Cup Germany results ===
(key) (Races in bold indicate pole position) (Races in italics indicate fastest lap)

Year	Team	1	2	3	4	5	6	7	8	9	10	11	12	13	14	15	16	DC	Points
2026	Forch Racing by Atlas Ward	IMO; 1; 11	IMO; 2; 9	RBR; 1; 18	RBR; 2; 11	SPA; 1; 6	SPA; 2; 4	ZAN; 1; 15	ZAN; 2 Ret	LAU; 1; 18	LAU; 2; 13	**NOR**; **1**; 1	NOR; 2; 18	NÜR; 1	NÜR; 2	HOC; 1	HOC; 2	13th	71
