= Jamie Stanley =

British racing driver (born 1983)

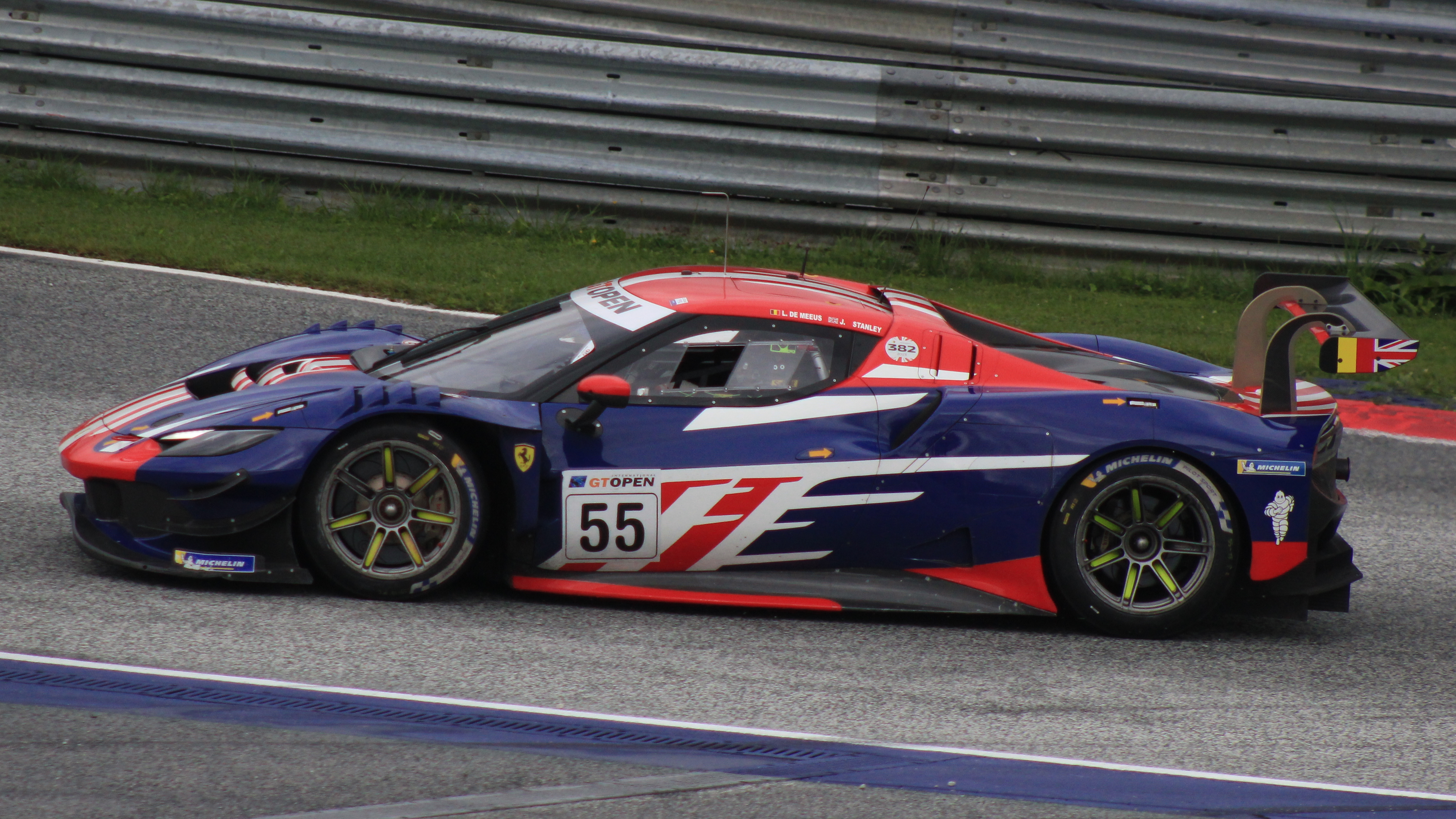
- Stanley in 2024
- Nationality: (United Kingdom) British
- Born: 24 July 1983 (age 43) Chester, England
- Categorisation: FIA Silver (until 2022, 2026–); FIA Gold (2023–2025)

Championship titles
- 2023 2014 2010: British Endurance Championship – Class B GT Cup Championship – GTC; British GT Championship – G4

Jamie Lee Stanley (born 24 July 1983) is a British racing driver who last competed in the 24H Series Middle East for Dragon Racing. He has raced professionally in the International GT Open and British GT Championship.

== Career ==
Stanley made his car racing debut in 2005, racing at the Walter Hayes Trophy. After spending two years in Formula Ford competition and racing in the Lotus Elise Trophy in 2009, Stanley joined Speedworks Motorsport to compete in the G4 class of the British GT Championship the following year. Sharing a Ginetta G50 with Christian Dick, Stanley began the year by winning at Oulton Park, Spa and both Knockhill races, before ending the season with a win at Donington Park and three other podiums to secure the G4 title.

In 2011, Stanley raced in the Lotus Cup UK, finishing seventh in the Exige Cup standings. before making one-off appearances in the MSV F3 Cup for Lanan Racing and the British GT Championship for FF Corse's Ferrari F430 GT3 in the GT3B class in 2012 and 2013, respectively. Returning to full-time British GT competition for 2014, Stanley drove Fox Motorsport's Ginetta G55 GT4 to a seventh-place points finish with a lone podium at Brands Hatch, partnering Paul McNeilly. In parallel, Stanley raced in the GT Cup Championship, in which he secured the GTC title alongside John Seale aboard a Ferrari 458.

Continuing with Fox for 2015, Stanley won race two at Snetterton and finished on the podium in race two at Oulton Park to take sixth in points. During 2015, Stanley also raced for FF Corse in select rounds of the GT Cup Championship, finishing fourth in GTC with two wins to his name, as well as making a one-off appearance in the Caterham Supersport Championship. The following year, Stanley made a one-off appearance in International GT Open at Silverstone, driving a Ferrari 488 GT3 alongside McNeilly. After winning race one in the Am class and taking overall pole for race two, Stanley's car was reclassified as a Pro-Am entry for race two, in which he finished seventh overall. During 2016, Stanley also made select appearances in the British GT Championship for Fox Motorsport in GT4, as well as the Dubai 24 Hour in the SP3 class for track-club.

After primarily racing in the Britcar Endurance Championship for FF Corse in 2017, Stanley returned to Fox Motorsport for select rounds of the 24H GT Series Europe, winning the 24 Hours of Portimão and the 12 Hours of Spa-Francorchamps to take runner-up honors in GT4. One-off appearances in the British GT Championship for Lamborghini-fielding JMH Automotive and Ferrari customer team FF Corse then ensued over the next two seasons, before Stanley reunited with Fox Motorsport for his full-time return to the series in 2021. Driving a McLaren 570S GT4 with Nick Halstead, Stanley scored wins at Snetterton and Donington Park, as well as four other podiums en route to runner-up honours in GT4 Pro-Am. During 2021, Stanley also drove for JMH Automotive in select rounds of the Britcar Endurance Championship, winning all four of the races he started to take third in the Class 1 standings.

Stanley and Halstead then graduated to GT3 full-time with Fox the following year, driving a McLaren 720S GT3 in British GT. After finishing on the podium at Oulton Park and taking an outright win at Spa, despite racing under appeal for failing post-qualifying technical checks, the pair capped off the year sixth in GT3 Pro-Am when his Spa win was upheld by the UK's National Court in September. During 2022, Stanley also raced for Ferrari-linked AF Corse in select rounds of the International GT Open season, primarily racing in the Am class, in which he finished fifth in points after taking a class podium in all five races he started. Across the following three seasons, Stanley often ran with Laurent de Meeûs in the International GT Open's Pro-Am class for AF Corse, taking a best outright result of 10th at Spa in 2023. During this time period, Stanley also helped RNR Performance Cars clinch the Class B title of the 2023 British Endurance Championship as the class' sole entrant throughout the season. In early 2026, Stanley raced for Dragon Racing at the 6 Hours of Abu Dhabi alongside Ferrari regular Matt Griffin, John Dhillon and de Meeûs.

== Racing record ==
=== Racing career summary ===
Season	Series	Team	Races	Wins	Poles	F/Laps	Podiums	Points	Position
2009	Britcar Endurance Championship	FF Corse	1						
2010	Britcar Endurance Championship	Orbital Sound Ltd / Chris Headlam	6						
2010	British GT Championship – G4	Speedworks Motorsport	13	5	2	1	9	70.5	**1st**
2010	GT4 European Cup – GT4	Speedworks Motorsport	0	0	0	0	0	0	NC
2010	Belcar	Speedworks Motorsport	1						
2011	Lotus Cup UK – Exige Cup	GT Trucktyre						90	7th
2011	Walter Hayes Trophy		1	0	0	0	0	—N/a	23rd
2012	F3 Cup – Trophy Class	Lanan Racing	2	2	1	2	2		
2012	Britcar Endurance Championship	Chris Headlam	1						
2012	Britcar Endurance Championship	Fox Motorsport	1						
2013	British GT Championship – GT3B	FF Corse	1	0	0	0	0	0	NC
2014	British GT Championship – GT4	Fox Motorsport	10	0	0	0	1	95.5	7th
2014	GT Cup Championship – GTC							466‡	**1st‡**
2015	British GT Championship – GT4	Fox Motorsport	9	1	1	0	2	85	6th
2015	GT Cup Championship – GTC	FF Corse	5	2	0	4	5	208‡	4th‡
2015	Avon Tyres Caterham Supersport Championship		2	1	1	0	2	0	NC†
2016	24H Series – SP3	track-club	1	0	0	0	0	10	23rd
2016	International GT Open – Am	FF Corse	1	1	0	1	1	5	12th
2016	International GT Open – Pro-Am	FF Corse	1	0	1	0	0	0	NC
2016	British GT Championship – GT4	Fox Motorsport	2	0	0	0	0	3	22nd
2016	Ginetta GT4 Supercup – Professional	Fox Motorsport	3	0	0	0	0	18	16th
2017	24H Series – SP3-GT4	track-club	1	0	0	0	0	14	9th
2017	Britcar Endurance Championship	FF Corse							
2017	GT Cup Championship – GTC	FF Corse	4	0	0	0	0	58	6th
2018	24H GT Series Continents – SPX	Fox Motorsport	1	0	0	0	1	0	NC
2018	24H GT Series Europe – GT4	Fox Motorsport	2	2	1	2	2	55	**2nd**
2019	24H GT Series Continents – GT4	Fox Motorsport	1	0	0	0	0	0	NC
2019	British GT Championship – GT3 Pro-Am	JMH Automotive	1	0	0	0	0	0	NC†
2019	Britcar Endurance Championship – Class 4	Maximum Motorsport	2	1	1	2	1	87‡	9th‡
2020	British GT Championship – GTC	FF Corse	1	0	0	0	0	0	NC†
2021	British GT Championship – GT4 Pro-Am	Fox Motorsport	8	2	0	0	6	166	**2nd**
2021	Britcar Endurance Championship – Class 1	JMH Automotive	4	4	1	4	4	125‡	**3rd‡**
2021	International GT Open – Pro-Am	FF Corse	0	0	0	0	0	0	17th
2022	British GT Championship – GT3 Pro-Am	Fox Motorsport	8	1	0	0	2	113.5	6th
2022	International GT Open – Am	AF Corse	5	0	0	0	5	42	5th
2022	International GT Open – Pro-Am	AF Corse	2	0	0	0	0	6	16th
2022	British Endurance Championship – Class B	FF Corse	1	0	0	0	1	28‡	**3rd‡**
2023	International GT Open – Pro-Am	AF Corse	11	0	0	0	0	14	13th
2023	Le Mans Cup – GT3	AF Corse	2	0	0	0	0	0	NC†
2023	British Endurance Championship – Class B	RNR Performance Cars						36.5‡	**1st‡**
2024	International GT Open – Pro-Am	AF Corse	12	0	0	0	0	8	26th
2024	British Endurance Championship – Class A	JMH Automotive	2	0	0	0	2	50‡	**2nd‡**
2025	Britcar Endurance Championship – Challenge	Mtech	2	0	0	0	0	28.5‡	7th‡
2025	International GT Open – Pro-Am	AF Corse	5	0	0	0	0	4	26th
2025–26	24H Series Middle East – GT3	Dragon Racing	1	0	0	0	0	14	NC

^{†} As Stanley was a guest driver, he was ineligible to score points.

^{‡} Team standings.

=== Complete British GT Championship results ===
(key) (Races in bold indicate pole position) (Races in italics indicate fastest lap)

Year	Team	Car	Class	1	2	3	4	5	6	7	8	9	10	11	12	13	Pos	Points
2010	Speedworks Motorsport	Ginetta G50	G4	**OUL**; **1**; 12	OUL; 2; 10	KNO; 1; 9	KNO; 2; 5	SPA; 11	ROC; 1; 13	ROC; 2; 9	SIL; Ret	SNE; 1; 13	SNE; 2; 12	**BRH**; **1**; 8	BRH; 2; 9	DON; 11	1st	70.5
2013	FF Corse	Ferrari F430 GT3	GT3B	OUL; 1	OUL; 2	ROC	SIL; 22	SNE; 1	SNE; 2	BRH	ZAN; 1	ZAN; 2	DON				NC	0
2014	Fox Motorsport	Ginetta G55 GT4	GT4	OUL; 1 Ret	OUL; 2; 26	ROC; 19	SIL; 23	SNE; 1; 24	SNE; 2; 25†	SPA; 1; 30	SPA; 2; 27	BRH; 20	DON; 18				7th	95.5
2015	Fox Motorsport	Ginetta G55 GT4	GT4	OUL; 1; 24	OUL; 2; 14	ROC; 16	SIL; 17	SPA; 17	BRH; Ret	SNE; 1 Ret	SNE; 2; 14	DON; 22					6th	85
2016	Fox Motorsport	Ginetta G55 GT4	GT4	BRH	ROC	OUL; 1	OUL; 2	SIL; 25	SPA	SNE; 1	SNE; 2	DON; 21					22nd	3
2019	JMH Automotive	Lamborghini Huracán GT3	GT3 Pro-Am	OUL; 1	OUL; 2	SNE; 1	SNE; 2	SIL; 10	DON1; WD	SPA	BRH	DON2					NC†	0†
2020	FF Corse	Ferrari 488 Challenge Evo	GTC	OUL; 1	OUL; 2	DON1; 1	DON1; 2	BRH	DON2	SNE; 1	SNE; 2	SIL; 17					NC†	0†
2021	Fox Motorsport	McLaren 570S GT4	GT4 Pro-Am	BRH; 18	SIL; 24	DON1; 10	SPA	SNE; 1; 17	SNE; 2; 17	OUL; 1; 17	OUL; 2; 20	DON2; 16					2nd	87
2022	Fox Motorsport	McLaren 720S GT3	GT3 Pro-Am	OUL; 1; 3	OUL; 2; 9	SIL; 13	DON1	SNE; 1; 9	SNE; 2; 8	SPA; 1	BRH; 10	DON2; 11					6th	113.5

=== Complete International GT Open results ===
Year	Team	Car	Class	1	2	3	4	5	6	7	8	9	10	11	12	13	14	Pos.	Points
2016	FF Corse	Ferrari 488 GT3	Am	EST; 1	EST; 2	SPA; 1	SPA; 2	LEC; 1	LEC; 2	SIL; 1; 7								12th	5
2016	FF Corse	Ferrari 488 GT3	Pro-Am								**SIL**; **2**; 7	RBR; 1	RBR; 2	MNZ; 1	MNZ; 2	CAT; 1	CAT; 2	NC	0
2021	FF Corse	Ferrari 488 GT3 Evo 2020	Pro-Am	LEC; 1	LEC; 2	SPA; 1 DNS	SPA; 2 DNS	HUN; 1	HUN; 2	IMO; 1	IMO; 2	RBR; 1	RBR; 2	MNZ; 1	MNZ; 2	CAT; 1	CAT; 2	17th	0
2022	AF Corse	Ferrari 488 GT3 Evo 2020	Am	EST; 1; 2	EST; 2; 3	LEC; 1; 3	LEC; 2; 3	SPA; 2	HUN; 1	HUN; 2	RBR; 1	RBR; 2						5th	42
2022	AF Corse	Ferrari 488 GT3 Evo 2020	Pro-Am										MNZ; 1; 6	MNZ; 2; 4	CAT; 1	CAT; 2		16th	6
2023	AF Corse	Ferrari 488 GT3 Evo 2020	Pro-Am	ALG; 1 Ret	ALG; 2; 9	SPA; 4	HUN; 1; 9	HUN; 2; 11	LEC; 1; 8	LEC; 2; 12†	RBR; 1	RBR; 2	MNZ; 1; 6	MNZ; 2; 7	CAT; 1; 5	CAT; 2; 7		13th	14
2024	AF Corse	Ferrari 488 GT3 Evo 2020	Pro-Am	ALG; 1; 13	ALG; 2; 17													26th	8
2024	AF Corse	Ferrari 296 GT3	Pro-Am			HOC; 1; 5	HOC; 2; 12	SPA; 15	HUN; 1	HUN; 2	LEC; 1; 14	LEC; 2; 17†	RBR; 1 Ret	RBR; 2; 12	CAT; 1; 5	CAT; 2; 14	MNZ; 13	26th	8
2025	AF Corse	Ferrari 296 GT3	Pro-Am	ALG; 1	ALG; 2	SPA; 10	HOC; 1; 9	HOC; 2; 5	HUN; 1	HUN; 2	LEC; 1	LEC; 2	RBR; 1	RBR; 2	CAT; 1; 9	CAT; 2; 9	MNZ	26th	4
