= 2019 Touring Car Trophy =

English car racing series

The 2019 Dunlop Touring Car Trophy is the inaugural season of the Touring Car Trophy. The championship features production-based touring cars built to either NGTC, TCR or Super 2000 specifications and will compete in ten races across five meetings across England. The championship is aimed as a feeder category to the BTCC and operated by Stewart Lines' Maximum Group. On April 5, it was announced that TCR UK had merged into the series and will be represented by the TCR class.

== Teams and drivers ==
The following teams and drivers are currently entered.

Team	Car	No.	Drivers	Rounds
TCR UK entries
(United Kingdom) HSG Sport with Maximum Motorsport	CUPRA León TCR	4	(United Kingdom) Richard Woods	3
(United Kingdom) HSG Sport with Maximum Motorsport	CUPRA León TCR	18	(United Kingdom) Mark Wakefield	2
(United Kingdom) Maximum Motorsport	CUPRA León TCR	32	(United Kingdom) Oliver Taylor	1
(United Kingdom) Maximum Motorsport	CUPRA León TCR	95	(United Kingdom) Stewart Lines	4
(Switzerland) Wolf-Power Racing	Renault Mégane R.S TCR	5	(United Kingdom) Alex Morgan	5
(Hong Kong) Teamwork Huff Motorsport	Volkswagen Golf GTI TCR	12	(Hong Kong) Sunny Wong	1, 3
(United Kingdom) Ciceley Motorsport	CUPRA León TCR	33	(United Kingdom) Adam Morgan	5
(United Kingdom) Ciceley Motorsport	CUPRA León TCR	61	(United Kingdom) James Turkington	2–5
(United Kingdom) Essex & Kent Motorsport	Hyundai i30 N TCR	38	(United Kingdom) Lewis Kent	All
(United Kingdom) Fox Motorsport	Honda Civic Type R TCR (FK2)	40	(United Kingdom) Nick Halstead	2, 4–5
(United Kingdom) Endurance Financial Racing	CUPRA León TCR	45	(United Kingdom) Carl Swift	1
(United Kingdom) DW Racing	Vauxhall Astra TCR	50	(United Kingdom) Darelle Wilson	2–5
Other TCR entries
(United Kingdom) Zest Racecar Engineering	SEAT León TCR	99	(United Kingdom) Guy Colclough	1
(Netherlands) DAT Racing	SEAT León TCR	99	(United Kingdom) Max Coates	2
NGTC entries
(United Kingdom) Team HARD	Volkswagen CC	1	(United Kingdom) Paul Taylor	5
(United Kingdom) Team HARD	Volkswagen CC	12	(United Kingdom) Josh Coggan	5
(United Kingdom) Team HARD	Volkswagen CC	285	(United Kingdom) Darren Lewis	5
(United Kingdom) Halfords Yuasa Racing	Honda Civic Type R (FK8)	25	(United Kingdom) Will Neal	5
(United Kingdom) Team Dynamics	Honda Civic Type R (FK2)	42	(United Kingdom) Henry Neal	All
(United Kingdom) Power Maxed Racing	Vauxhall Astra	95	(United Kingdom) Stewart Lines	5
(United Kingdom) Handy Motorsport	Audi A4	101	(United Kingdom) Alex Day	1–4
S2000 entries
(United Kingdom) HSG Sport	Ford Focus S2000 TC	4	(United Kingdom) Richard Woods	5
(United Kingdom) Ciceley Motorsport	SEAT León WTCC Supercopa	61	(United Kingdom) James Turkington	1

== Race calendar and results ==
The following meetings are as scheduled.

Round	Circuit	Date	Pole position	Fastest lap	Winning driver	Winning team	TCR UK winner
1	(United Kingdom) Oulton Park	May 11	(United Kingdom) Henry Neal	(United Kingdom) Ollie Taylor	(United Kingdom) Carl Swift	Endurance Financial Racing	(United Kingdom) Carl Swift
1	(United Kingdom) Oulton Park	May 11		(United Kingdom) Henry Neal	(United Kingdom) Ollie Taylor	Maximum Motorsport	(United Kingdom) Ollie Taylor
NC	(Belgium) Circuit de Spa-Francorchamps	June 5–6	(United Kingdom) Lewis Kent	(United Kingdom) Lewis Kent	(United Kingdom) Lewis Kent	Essex & Kent Motorsport	(United Kingdom) Lewis Kent
2	(United Kingdom) Donington Park Grand Prix	June 23	(United Kingdom) Lewis Kent	(United Kingdom) Lewis Kent	(United Kingdom) Max Coates	DAT Racing	(United Kingdom) Lewis Kent
2	(United Kingdom) Donington Park Grand Prix	June 23		(United Kingdom) Henry Neal	(United Kingdom) Max Coates	DAT Racing	(United Kingdom) James Turkington
3	(United Kingdom) Croft Circuit	July 7	(United Kingdom) Lewis Kent	(United Kingdom) Henry Neal	(United Kingdom) Lewis Kent	Essex & Kent Motorsport	(United Kingdom) Lewis Kent
3	(United Kingdom) Croft Circuit	July 7		(United Kingdom) Lewis Kent	(United Kingdom) Lewis Kent	Essex & Kent Motorsport	(United Kingdom) Lewis Kent
4	(United Kingdom) Brands Hatch Indy	July 28	(United Kingdom) Nick Halstead	(United Kingdom) Henry Neal	(United Kingdom) Henry Neal	Team Dynamics	(United Kingdom) James Turkington
4	(United Kingdom) Brands Hatch Indy	July 28		(United Kingdom) Lewis Kent	(United Kingdom) James Turkington	Cicely Motorsport	(United Kingdom) James Turkington
5	(United Kingdom) Donington Park	October 19–20	(United Kingdom) Henry Neal	(United Kingdom) Darren Lewis	(United Kingdom) Adam Morgan	Cicely Motorsport	(United Kingdom) Adam Morgan
5	(United Kingdom) Donington Park	October 19–20		(United Kingdom) Henry Neal	(United Kingdom) Henry Neal	Team Dynamics	(United Kingdom) Adam Morgan

== Championship standings ==
Touring Car Trophy Points system
1st	2nd	3rd	4th	5th	6th	7th	8th	9th	10th	11th	12th	13th	14th	15th	16th	17th	18th	19th	20th	Other Finish	R1 PP	Fastest lap
44	40	38	36	34	32	30	28	26	24	22	20	18	16	14	12	10	8	6	4	2	2	2

- A driver's best 4 rounds counted towards the championship, with any other points being discarded.

=== Drivers' standings ===
TCR UK Points system
1st	2nd	3rd	4th	5th	6th	7th	8th	9th	10th	Q 1st	Q 2nd	Q 3rd	Q 4th	Q 5th
25	18	15	12	10	8	6	4	2	1	5	4	3	2	1

Pos	Driver	(United Kingdom) OUL		(United Kingdom) DON		(United Kingdom) CRO		(United Kingdom) BHI		(United Kingdom) DON		Points
Pos	Driver	RD1	RD2	RD1	RD2	RD1	RD2	RD1	RD2	RD1	RD2	Points
1	(United Kingdom) Henry Neal	DSQ	2	4	2	2	Ret	1	3	6	1	366
2	(United Kingdom) James Turkington	4	4	5	3	3	2	2	1	8	7	364
3	(United Kingdom) Lewis Kent	DNS	DNS	2	Ret	1	1	6	2	3	3	286
4	(United Kingdom) Darelle Wilson	WD	WD	7	5	5	3	7	7	7	5	260
5	(United Kingdom) Nick Halstead			6	6			3	6	10	10	184
6	(United Kingdom) Alex Day	2	Ret	NC	7	4	Ret	5	4			176
7	(United Kingdom) Stewart Lines							4	5	11	12	112
8	(United Kingdom) Max Coates			1	1							88
9	(United Kingdom) Adam Morgan									1	2	84
10	(United Kingdom) Carl Swift	1	3									82
11	(United Kingdom) Richard Woods					Ret	4			9	13	80
12	(United Kingdom) Alex Morgan									2	4	76
13	(United Kingdom) Mark Wakefield			3	4							74
14	(Hong Kong) Sunny Wong	3	5			Ret	Ret					72
15	(United Kingdom) Guy Colclough	5	6									66
16	(United Kingdom) Darren Lewis									4	9	64
17	(United Kingdom) Josh Coggan									5	8	62
18	(United Kingdom) Will Neal									12	6	52
19	(United Kingdom) Ollie Taylor	Ret	1									46
20	(United Kingdom) Paul Taylor									DSQ	11	22
TCR UK
1	(United Kingdom) James Turkington			5	3	3	2	2	1	8	7	161
2	(United Kingdom) Lewis Kent	DNS	DNS	2	Ret	1	1	6	2	3	3	156
3	(United Kingdom) Darelle Wilson	WD	WD	7	5	5	3	7	7	7	5	116
4	(United Kingdom) Nick Halstead			6	6			3	6	10	10	82
5	(United Kingdom) Adam Morgan									1	2	54
6	(United Kingdom) Carl Swift	1	3									47
7	(Hong Kong) Sunny Wong	3	5			Ret	Ret					39
8	(United Kingdom) Mark Wakefield			3	4							38
9	(United Kingdom) Stewart Lines							4	5			34
10	(United Kingdom) Alex Morgan									2	4	34
11	(United Kingdom) Ollie Taylor	Ret	1									30
12	(United Kingdom) Richard Woods					Ret	4					14
Pos	Driver	(United Kingdom) OUL		(United Kingdom) DON		(United Kingdom) CRO		(United Kingdom) BHI		(United Kingdom) DON		Points

=== Teams' championship ===
Pos	Team	(United Kingdom) OUL		(United Kingdom) DON		(United Kingdom) CRO		(United Kingdom) BHI		(United Kingdom) DON		Points
Pos	Team	RD1	RD2	RD1	RD2	RD1	RD2	RD1	RD2	RD1	RD2	Points
1	(United Kingdom) Ciceley Motorsport	4	4	5	3	3	2	2	1	1	2	448
1	(United Kingdom) Ciceley Motorsport									8	7	448
2	(United Kingdom) Team Dynamics	DSQ	2	4	2	2	Ret	1	3	6	1	366
3	(United Kingdom) Essex & Kent Motorsport	DNS	DNS	2	Ret	1	1	6	2	3	3	286
4	(United Kingdom) DW Racing	WD	WD	7	5	5	3	7	7	7	5	260
5	(United Kingdom) Fox Motorsport			6	6			3	6	10	10	184
6	(United Kingdom) Handy Motorsport	2	Ret	NC	7	4	Ret	5	4			176
7	(United Kingdom) Team HARD									4	8	126
7	(United Kingdom) Team HARD									5	9	126
8	(United Kingdom) Maximum Motorsport	Ret	1					4	5			116
9	(United Kingdom) HSG Sport with Maximum Motorsport			3	4	Ret	4					110
10	(Netherlands) DAT Racing			1	1							88
12	(Switzerland) Wolf-Power Racing									2	4	76
13	(Hong Kong) Teamwork Huff Motorsport	3	5			Ret	Ret					72
14	(United Kingdom) Zest Racecar Engineering	5	6									66
15	(United Kingdom) Halfords Yuasa Racing									12	6	52
16	(United Kingdom) HSG Sport									9	13	44
17	(United Kingdom) Power Maxed Racing									11	12	42
TCR UK
1	(United Kingdom) Ciceley Motorsport			5	3	3	2	2	1	1	2	215
1	(United Kingdom) Ciceley Motorsport									8	7	215
2	(United Kingdom) Essex & Kent Motorsport	DNS	DNS	2	Ret	1	1	6	2	3	3	156
3	(United Kingdom) DW Racing	WD	WD	7	5	5	3	7	7	7	5	106
4	(United Kingdom) Fox Motorsport			6	6			3	6	10	10	82
5	(United Kingdom) Maximum Motorsport	Ret	1					4	5			64
6	(United Kingdom) HSG Sport with Maximum Motorsport			3	4	Ret	4					52
7	(United Kingdom) Endurance Financial Racing	1	3									47
8	(Hong Kong) Teamwork Huff Motorsport	3	5			Ret	Ret					39
9	(Switzerland) Wolf-Power Racing									2	4	34
Pos	Team	(United Kingdom) OUL		(United Kingdom) DON		(United Kingdom) CRO		(United Kingdom) BHI		(United Kingdom) DON		Points
