= 2020 Ginetta GT4 Supercup =

The 2020 Millers Oils Ginetta GT4 Supercup is a multi-event, one make GT motor racing championship held across England and Scotland. The championship features a mix of professional motor racing teams and privately funded drivers, competing in Ginetta G55s that conform to the technical regulations for the championship. It forms part of the extensive program of support categories built up around the BTCC centrepiece. It is the tenth Ginetta GT4 Supercup, having rebranded from the Ginetta G50 Cup, which ran between 2008 and 2010. The season commenced on 2 August at Donington Park and concludes on 15 November at Brands Hatch, utilising the Indy circuit, after nineteen races held at seven meetings, all in support of the 2020 British Touring Car Championship.

== Teams and drivers ==
On 17 January 2020, it was announced that a new Pro-Am class would be added.

Team	No.	Drivers	Rounds
Professional
Privateer	12	Reece Somerfield	1–5
Rob Boston Racing	14	Will Burns	All
Rob Boston Racing	29	Jason Baker	6
Rob Boston Racing	32	Charlie Ladell	2
Rob Boston Racing	44	Finley Green	1–3
Rob Boston Racing	99	Joe Marshall-Birks	All
AK Motorsport	20	James Blake-Baldwin	2
Graves Motorsport	26	Luke Reade	6–7
Elite Motorsport	27	Tom Emson	1
Elite Motorsport	54	Adam Smalley	All
Maximum Motorsport	36	Luke Williams	1
Century Motorsport	57	Gus Burton	All
Triple M Motorsport	81	Tom Hibbert	All
Prophet FX Racing	92	Jamie Falvey	All
Pro-Am
Century Motorsport	11	Chris Salkeld	6–7
Assetto Motorsport	11	Chris Salkeld	1–5
Assetto Motorsport	47	Simon Traves	6
Elite Motorsport	27	Tom Emson	2–7
Team HARD	50	Callum Jenkins	6
Team HARD	68	Eric Boulton	4, 7
CWS Motorsport	78	Colin White	All
Amateur
Elite Motorsport	4	Peter Mangion	1, 3, 5
Assetto Motorsport	10	Lee Goldsmith	1–2, 4–5, 7
AK Motorsport	19	Carl Garnett	All
Triple M Motorsport	31	Daniel Morris	6
Fox Motorsport	40	Nick Halstead	All
Maximum Motorsport	95	Stewart Lines	All

== Race Calendar ==
Round	Circuit	Date	Pole position	Fastest lap	Winning driver	Winning team	Winning Pro-Am	Winning Am
1	Donington Park (National Circuit, Leicestershire)	1 August	Gus Burton	Will Burns	Will Burns	Rob Boston Racing	Colin White	Nick Halstead
1	Donington Park (National Circuit, Leicestershire)	2 August		Gus Burton	Will Burns	Rob Boston Racing	Colin White	Nick Halstead
1	Donington Park (National Circuit, Leicestershire)	2 August		Gus Burton	Gus Burton	Century Motorsport	Colin White	Peter Mangion
2	Brands Hatch (Grand Prix Circuit, Kent)	8–9 August	Tom Hibbert	Tom Hibbert	Tom Hibbert	Triple M Motorsport	Chris Salkeld	Nick Halstead
2	Brands Hatch (Grand Prix Circuit, Kent)	8–9 August		Tom Hibbert	Tom Hibbert	Triple M Motorsport	Tom Emson	Stewart Lines
2	Brands Hatch (Grand Prix Circuit, Kent)	8–9 August		Will Burns	Adam Smalley	Elite Motorsport	Chris Salkeld	Stewart Lines
3	Oulton Park (Island Circuit, Cheshire)	22–23 August	Will Burns	Gus Burton	Gus Burton	Century Motorsport	Colin White	Carl Garnett
3	Oulton Park (Island Circuit, Cheshire)	22–23 August		Gus Burton	Gus Burton	Century Motorsport	Colin White	Carl Garnett
4	Thruxton Circuit (Hampshire)	19–20 September	Gus Burton	Jamie Falvey	Jamie Falvey	Prophet FX Racing	Colin White	Carl Garnett
4	Thruxton Circuit (Hampshire)	19–20 September		Jamie Falvey	Jamie Falvey	Prophet FX Racing	Tom Emson	Carl Garnett
4	Thruxton Circuit (Hampshire)	19–20 September		Adam Smalley	Tom Hibbert	Triple M Motorsport	Tom Emson	Carl Garnett
5	Croft Circuit (North Yorkshire)	10–11 October	Will Burns	Will Burns	Will Burns	Rob Boston Racing	Tom Emson	Carl Garnett
5	Croft Circuit (North Yorkshire)	10–11 October		Adam Smalley	Will Burns	Rob Boston Racing	Tom Emson	Carl Garnett
5	Croft Circuit (North Yorkshire)	10–11 October		Adam Smalley	Adam Smalley	Elite Motorsport	Tom Emson	Carl Garnett
6	Snetterton Circuit (300 Circuit, Norfolk)	24–25 October	Will Burns	Adam Smalley	Will Burns	Rob Boston Racing	Tom Emson	Daniel Morris
6	Snetterton Circuit (300 Circuit, Norfolk)	24–25 October		Will Burns	Adam Smalley	Elite Motorsport	Chris Salkeld	Daniel Morris
6	Snetterton Circuit (300 Circuit, Norfolk)	24–25 October		Gus Burton	Gus Burton	Century Motorsport	Tom Emson	Daniel Morris
7	Brands Hatch (Indy Circuit, Kent)	14–15 November	Adam Smalley	Adam Smalley	Adam Smalley	Elite Motorsport	Tom Emson	Carl Garnett
7	Brands Hatch (Indy Circuit, Kent)	14–15 November		Gus Burton	Gus Burton	Century Motorsport	Tom Emson	Carl Garnett

== Championship standings ==
Points system
1st	2nd	3rd	4th	5th	6th	7th	8th	9th	10th	11th	12th	13th	14th	15th	16th	17th	18th	19th	20th	R1 PP	FL
35	30	26	22	20	18	16	14	12	11	10	9	8	7	6	5	4	3	2	1	1	1

Notes

- A driver's best 18 scores counted towards the championship, with any other points being discarded.

=== Drivers' championships ===
Pos	Driver	DON			BHGP			OUL		THR			CRO			SNE			BHI		Points
Professional
1	Will Burns	1	1	2	3	3	4	2	(8)	2	4	2	1	1	2	1	2	5	4	2	534
2	Gus Burton	3	2	1	2	2	2	1	1	Ret	3	3	3	3	9	Ret	3	1	2	1	495
3	Tom Hibbert	2	3	3	1	1	3	3	4	3	5	1	(6)	5	4	4	4	3	5	4	466
4	Adam Smalley	4	4	(10)	4	4	1	4	3	Ret	2	4	2	2	1	3	1	4	1	3	462
5	Jamie Falvey	6	6	5	5	5	7	5	2	1	1	5	5	4	3	2	Ret	2	Ret	Ret	382
6	Joe Marshall-Birks	10	7	(16)	7	6	5	6	5	12	6	14	4	6	5	5	5	8	6	7	332
7	Reece Somerfield	7	5	4	8	15	12	Ret	9	4	Ret	6	10	Ret	Ret						170
8	Finley Green	5	8	6	10	8	Ret	10	10												107
9	James Blake-Baldwin				9	7	6														46
10	Luke Williams	Ret	13	9																	27
11	Tom Emson	9	11	Ret																	26
12	Charlie Ladell				6	Ret	Ret														18
-	Luke Reade*															6	8	6	9	6	-
Pro-Am
1	Colin White	8	9	7	(Ret)	11	10	7	6	6	9	8	8	8	7	8	9	9	7	9	558
2	Chris Salkeld	12	10	8	11	12	8	8	7	7	8	10	12	Ret	8	12	7	10	8	8	527
3	Tom Emson				12	9	9	9	11	5	7	7	7	7	6	7	Ret	7	3	5	513
4	Eric Boulton									9	11	11							13	Ret	88
-	Simon Traves*															10	NC	14			-
-	Callum Jenkins*															13	11	Ret			-
Am
1	Stewart Lines	13	15	13	14	10	11	12	13	10	14	13	(15)	12	11	14	12	13	11	11	528
2	Carl Garnett	14	Ret	14	Ret	13	Ret	11	12	8	10	9	9	9	10	15	10	15	10	10	526
3	Nick Halstead	11	12	12	13	14	13	Ret	14	DNS	12	12	13	11	12	11	13	12	Ret	12	477
4	Lee Goldsmith	16	16	15	15	Ret	DNS			11	13	15	14	13	14				12	13	272
5	Peter Mangion	15	14	11				13	Ret				11	10	13						195
-	Daniel Morris*															9	6	11			-
Pos	Driver	DON			BHGP			OUL		THR			CRO			SNE			BHI		Points

* Guest entry - not eligible for points
