= Nick Halstead =

British racing driver (born 1972)

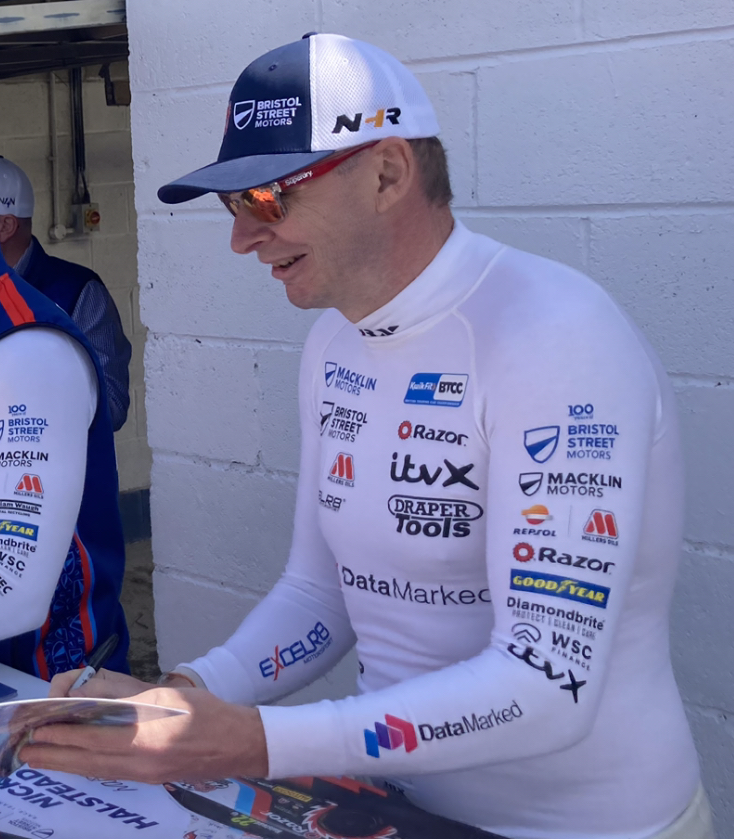
- Halstead at Thruxton Circuit in 2024
- Nationality: (United Kingdom) British
- Born: Nicholas John Halstead; 9 April 1972 (age 54) Kent, United Kingdom

British Touring Car Championship career
- Debut season: 2021
- Current team: Steel Seal with Power Maxed Racing
- Categorisation: FIA Bronze
- Car number: 55
- Former teams: Team Bristol Street Motors
- Starts: 99 (100 entries)
- Wins: 0
- Poles: 0
- Best finish: 22nd in 2024

Previous series
- 2023 2022, 2021 2022, 2021, 2020 2019, 2018, 2017 2019 2019 2019: Asian Le Mans Series; British GT; Ginetta GT4 Supercup; Ginetta GT5 Challenge; TCR UK; Renault Clio Cup UK; Dunlop Touring Car Trophy

Championship titles
- 2018: Ginetta GT5 Challenge AM

Nicholas John Halstead (born 9 April 1972 in Kent) is a British racing driver, software engineer and entrepreneur who is set to compete in the British Touring Car Championship for Steel Seal with Power Maxed Racing. Halstead has previously competed in British GT and the Ginetta GT4 Supercup. He won the AM title in the 2018 Ginetta GT5 Challenge, and made his British Touring Car Championship debut at Croft in 2021, substituting for Rick Parfitt Jr. at Excelr8 with TradePriceCars.com.

Halstead is the founder of companies such as Infosum, Datasift and TweetMeme, the latter of which was the first site containing the retweet feature, before it was sold to Twitter in 2010.

== Career ==
=== Fav.or.it ===
In October 2007, the Fav.or.it company was founded, a proposed blog commenting system founded on principle that consumers and businesses both need content curated. The site was launched in 2008, and quickly built to 500,000 monthly users.

=== TweetMeme ===
In January 2008, the first prototype of TweetMeme was released, a site founded by Halstead which tracked trending topics on the social media giant Twitter. The site would find new topics being talked about, and would track numbers talking about them to rank them, an aggregator. The full site was then launched to the public in July the same year.

In February 2009, the retweet button was released onto the website, a feature allowing users to share posts they liked. Although this feature was founded on the TweetMeme website, it soon became a standard feature of almost all forum and social media sites, with approximately 1.6 billion retweet buttons across different pages on the internet.

On 12 August 2010, the retweet feature was sold to Twitter, and the website was shut down in September 2012, when it still had 3 million users at the time.

=== DataSift ===
Halstead announced DataSift in September 2010 at the TechCrunch Disrupt conference, a social data platform that provides brands and enterprises with access to content from the likes of Facebook, Twitter, Tumblr and dozens of other social networks. The software was officially released in November 2011.

Halstead stepped down as CEO of the company in October 2015.

=== InfoSum ===
In late 2015, Halstead founded Cognitive Logic, a data collaboration company. It was rebranded to InfoSum in September 2017. WPP bought InfoSum in AI push in April, 2025.

== Racing career ==
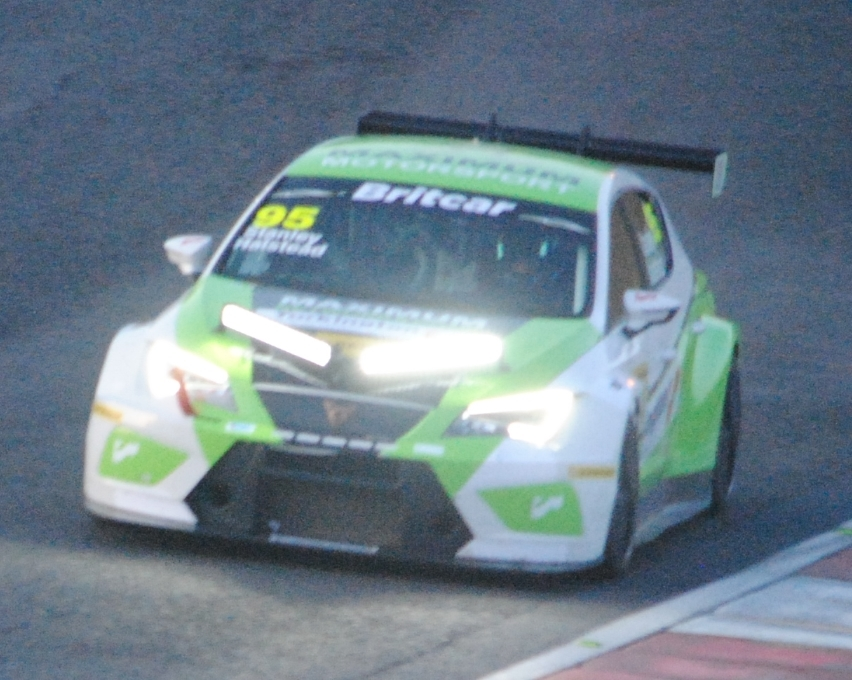
Halstead's CUPRA León TCR competing in the 2019 Britcar Endurance Championship.

=== Ginetta GT5 Challenge ===
In 2017, Halstead would make his professional racing debut in the Ginetta GT5 Challenge with Fox Motorsport. Competing in the AM class, in this year he would pick up ten podiums in the class to finish third in the AM standings.

Halstead would continue with Fox Motorsport in the AM class in 2018, where with four in-class victories he would go on to win the AM title.

In 2019, Halstead made the switch to the Pro class, still competing with Fox Motorsport, where he had a best finish of 11th.

=== Ginetta GT4 Supercup ===
Competing in a handful of races in series such as TCR UK and the Renault Clio Cup UK alongside his Ginetta GT5 campaign across 2019, in 2020, Halstead would step up to the Ginetta GT4 Supercup, competing in the Pro-AM class still with Fox Motorsport. Across this season in his class he racked up three wins, 15 podiums, three pole positions and four fastest laps on his way to third in the championship standings.

With Fox Motorsport, Halstead would compete in the rounds at Oulton Park and Brands Hatch in 2021 in the Pro-AM class, scoring a second-place finish at Brands Hatch.

Halstead continued in the championship with Fox Motorsport in 2022 in the G55 Pro class alongside his British GT campaign.

=== British GT ===
Halstead made his British GT debut in 2021, racing a McLaren 570S in the GT4 Pro-AM class alongside teammate Jamie Stanley. The duo achieved two wins in class over the course of seven races to finish second in the GT4 Pro-AM cup and tied 8th overall in the GT4 category.

Halstead continued with Fox Motorsport in the series in 2022, this time switching to the GT3 category.

=== British Touring Car Championship ===
Halstead made his British Touring Car Championship debut at Croft in 2021, substituting for Rick Parfitt Jr. at Excelr8 with TradePriceCars.com. Over the course of the weekend, Halstead finished in a better position every race, driving home to 21st position in Race 3. Halstead will make a surprise return to the series at the 6th round of the 2026 season at Knockhill with Power Maxed Racing. He is expected to complete the rest of the season after Knockhill.

Halstead returned midway through 2026 with Power Maxed Racing.

== Racing record ==
=== Racing career summary ===
Season	Series	Team	Races	Wins	Poles	F/Laps	Podiums	Points	Position
2017	Ginetta GT5 Challenge - AM Class	Fox Motorsport	19	0	?	?	10	?	**3rd**
2018	Ginetta GT5 Challenge - AM Class	Fox Motorsport	15	4	?	?	?	?	**1st**
2019	Ginetta GT5 Challenge	Fox Motorsport	13	0	0	0	0	0	?
2019	TCR UK	Fox Motorsport	6	0	1	0	1	82	4th
2019	Touring Car Trophy	Fox Motorsport	6	0	1	0	1	184	5th
2019	Britcar Endurance Championship - Class 4	Maximum Motorsport	2	0	1	1	1	87	9th
2019	Renault Clio Cup UK	Westbourne Motorsport	2	0	0	0	0	10	17th
2020	Ginetta GT4 Supercup - AM Class	Fox Motorsport	18	3	3	4	15	477	**3rd**
2021	British GT Championship - GT4	Fox Motorsport	8	0	0	0	1	66.5	9th
2021	Ginetta GT4 Supercup - Pro-Am	Fox Motorsport	5	0	0	0	1	151	6th
2021	British Touring Car Championship	Excelr8 with TradePriceCars.com	3	0	0	0	0	0	34th
2022	British GT Championship	Fox Motorsport	9	1	0	0	2	81	7th
2022	Ginetta GT4 Supercup - G55 Pro	Fox Motorsport	17	0	0	0	1	276	5th
2023	British Touring Car Championship	Bristol Street Motors with EXCELR8	30	0	0	0	0	-5	30th
2023	Asian Le Mans Series - GT	Garage 59	4	0	0	0	0	11	13th
2023-24	Middle East Trophy - GT4	Century Motorsport	1	0	0	0	0	0	NC†
2024	British Touring Car Championship	Team Bristol Street Motors	28	0	0	0	0	7	22nd
2025	British Touring Car Championship	Motor Parts Direct with Power Maxed Racing	23	0	0	0	0	4	27th
2025	Le Mans Cup - GT3	Optimum Motorsport							
2025	McLaren Trophy Europe	Paddock Motorsport							
2025-26	24H Series Middle East - 992	ARMotors by HRT Performance							
2026	British Touring Car Championship	Steel Seal with Power Maxed Racing	15	0	0	0	0	0	26th

† As Halstead didn't complete more than one round, he was not eligible for points.

=== Complete British GT Championship results ===
(key) (Races in bold indicate pole position) (Races in italics indicate fastest lap)

Year	Team	Car	Class	1	2	3	4	5	6	7	8	9	DC	Points
2021	Fox Motorsport	McLaren 570S GT4	GT4	BRH; 1; 18	SIL; 1; 24	DON; 1; 10	SPA; 1	SNE; 1; 17	SNE; 2; 17	OUL; 1; 18	OUL; 2; 21	DON; 1; 16	9th	66.5
2022	Fox Motorsport	McLaren 720S GT3	GT3	OUL; 1; 3	OUL; 2; 9	SIL; 1; 13	DON; 1; 9	SNE; 1; 9	SNE; 2; 8	SPA; 1; 1	BRH; 1; 10	DON; 1; 11	7th	81

=== Complete British Touring Car Championship results ===
(key) Races in bold indicate pole position (1 point awarded – 2002–2003 all races, 2004–present just in first race) Races in italics indicate fastest lap (1 point awarded all races) * signifies that driver lead race for at least one lap (1 point awarded – 2002 just in feature races, 2003–present all races)

Year	Team	Car	1	2	3	4	5	6	7	8	9	10	11	12	13	14	15	16	17	18	19	20	21	22	23	24	25	26	27	28	29	30	DC	Points
2021	Excelr8 with TradePriceCars.com	Hyundai i30 Fastback N Performance	THR; 1	THR; 2	THR; 3	SNE; 1	SNE; 2	SNE; 3	BRH; 1	BRH; 2	BRH; 3	OUL; 1	OUL; 2	OUL; 3	KNO; 1	KNO; 2	KNO; 3	THR; 1	THR; 2	THR; 3	CRO; 1; 26	CRO; 2; 25	CRO; 3; 21	SIL; 1	SIL; 2	SIL; 3	DON; 1	DON; 2	DON; 3	BRH; 1	BRH; 2	BRH; 3	34th	0
2023	Bristol Street Motors with EXCELR8	Hyundai i30 Fastback N Performance	DON; 1 Ret	DON; 2; 7	DON; 3 Ret	BRH; 1; 23	BRH; 2; 23	BRH; 3; 20	SNE; 1; 26	SNE; 2; 25	SNE; 3; 21	THR; 1 NC	THR; 2; 23	THR; 3; 22	OUL; 1; 23	OUL; 2; 24	OUL; 3; 19	CRO; 1; 22	CRO; 2; 22	CRO; 3; 20	KNO; 1; 15	KNO; 2; 21	KNO; 3 Ret	DON; 1; 24	DON; 2; 20	DON; 3; 20	SIL; 1; 25	SIL; 2; 21	SIL; 3; 19	BRH; 1; 22	BRH; 2; 20	BRH; 3; 20	30th	-5
2024	Team Bristol Street Motors	Hyundai i30 Fastback N Performance	DON; 1; 16	DON; 2; 16	DON; 3; 17	BRH; 1; 17	BRH; 2; 13	BRH; 3; 17	SNE; 1; 20	SNE; 2 WD	SNE; 3 WD	THR; 1; 19	THR; 2; 19	THR; 3 Ret	OUL; 1; 17	OUL; 2; 18	OUL; 3; 17	CRO; 1; 20	CRO; 2 Ret	CRO; 3; 18	KNO; 1; 19	KNO; 2; 17	KNO; 3; 14	DON; 1; 19	DON; 2; 18	DON; 3; 17	SIL; 1; 16	SIL; 2; 18	SIL; 3; 18	BRH; 1; 14	BRH; 2; 17	BRH; 3; 19	22nd	7
2025	Motor Parts Direct with Power Maxed Racing	Vauxhall Astra	DON; 1	DON; 2	DON; 3	BRH; 1; 24	BRH; 2; 20	BRH; 3; 24	SNE; 1 Ret	SNE; 2; 23	SNE; 3; 21	THR; 1 WD	THR; 2 WD	THR; 3 WD	OUL; 1; 22	OUL; 2 Ret	OUL; 3 DNS	CRO; 1; 17	CRO; 2; 20	CRO; 3; 14													27th	4
2025	Motor Parts Direct with Power Maxed Racing	Cupra León																			KNO; 1 Ret	KNO; 2; 21	KNO; 3; 19	DON; 1; 22	DON; 2; 18	DON; 3 Ret	SIL; 1; 18	SIL; 2; 14	SIL; 3 NC	BRH; 1; 21	BRH; 2; 18	BRH; 3; 18	27th	4
2026	Steel Seal with Power Maxed Racing	Audi S3 Saloon	DON; 1	DON; 2	DON; 3	BRH; 1	BRH; 2	BRH; 3	SNE; 1	SNE; 2	SNE; 3	OUL; 1	OUL; 2	OUL; 3	THR; 1	THR; 2	THR; 3	KNO; 1; 20	KNO; 2; 18	KNO; 3; 20	DON; 1; 19	DON; 2; 20	DON; 3; 18	CRO; 1 Ret	CRO; 2; 21	CRO; 3; 17	SIL; 1; 19	SIL; 2; 21	SIL; 3; 22	BRH; 1; 19	BRH; 2; 22	BRH; 3 Ret	26th	0

=== Complete Asian Le Mans Series results ===
(key) (Races in bold indicate pole position) (Races in italics indicate fastest lap)

Year	Team	Class	Car	Engine	1	2	3	4	Pos.	Points
2023	Garage 59	GT	McLaren 720S GT3	McLaren M840T 4.0 L Turbo V8	DUB; 1; 12	DUB; 2; 5	ABU; 1; 11	ABU; 2; 10	13th	11
