= 2021 British GT Championship =

Sports car racing season

The 2021 British GT Championship (known for sponsorship reasons as the 2021 Intelligent Money British GT Championship) was the 29th British GT Championship, a sports car championship promoted by the SRO Motorsports Group. The season begins on 22 May at Brands Hatch and ends on 17 October at Donington Park.

== Calendar ==
The calendar was unveiled on 15 October 2020.
On 19 January 2021, a modified calendar was released.

| Round | Circuit | Length | Date |
|---|---|---|---|
| 1 | (United Kingdom) Brands Hatch, Kent | 120 min | 22–23 May |
| 2 | (United Kingdom) Silverstone Circuit, Northamptonshire | 180 min | 26–27 June |
| 3 | (United Kingdom) Donington Park, Leicestershire | 120 min | 10–11 July |
| 4 | Circuit de Spa-Francorchamps, Spa, Belgium | 120 min | 24–25 July |
| 5 | (United Kingdom) Snetterton Circuit, Norfolk | 60 min | 7–8 August |
| 6 | (United Kingdom) Snetterton Circuit, Norfolk | 60 min | 7–8 August |
| 7 | (United Kingdom) Oulton Park, Cheshire | 60 min | 11–12 September |
| 8 | (United Kingdom) Oulton Park, Cheshire | 60 min | 11–12 September |
| 9 | (United Kingdom) Donington Park, Leicestershire | 120 min | 16–17 October |

== Entry list ==
=== GT3 ===
| Team | Car | Engine | No. | Drivers | Class | | Rounds |
| Team | Car | Engine | No. | Drivers | Car | Driver | Rounds |
|---|---|---|---|---|---|---|---|
| (United Kingdom) Barwell Motorsport | Lamborghini Huracán GT3 Evo | Lamborghini 5.2 L V10 | 1 | (United Kingdom) Adam Balon | GT3 | PA | All |
| (United Kingdom) Barwell Motorsport | Lamborghini Huracán GT3 Evo | Lamborghini 5.2 L V10 | 1 | (United Kingdom) Sandy Mitchell | GT3 | PA | All |
| (United Kingdom) Barwell Motorsport | Lamborghini Huracán GT3 Evo | Lamborghini 5.2 L V10 | 63 | (Denmark) Dennis Lind | GT3 | PA | All |
| (United Kingdom) Barwell Motorsport | Lamborghini Huracán GT3 Evo | Lamborghini 5.2 L V10 | 63 | (Russia) Leo Machitski | GT3 | PA | All |
| (United Kingdom) Balfe Motorsport | McLaren 720S GT3 | McLaren M840T 4.0L Turbo V8 | 5 | (United Kingdom) Lewis Proctor | GT3 | S | All |
| (United Kingdom) Balfe Motorsport | McLaren 720S GT3 | McLaren M840T 4.0L Turbo V8 | 5 | (United Kingdom) Stewart Proctor | GT3 | S | All |
| (United Kingdom) Ram Racing | Mercedes-AMG GT3 Evo | Mercedes-AMG M159 6.2 L V8 | 6 | (Netherlands) Yelmer Buurman | GT3 | PA | All |
| (United Kingdom) Ram Racing | Mercedes-AMG GT3 Evo | Mercedes-AMG M159 6.2 L V8 | 6 | (United Kingdom) Ian Loggie | GT3 | PA | All |
| (United Kingdom) Ram Racing | Mercedes-AMG GT3 Evo | Mercedes-AMG M159 6.2 L V8 | 69 | (United Kingdom) James Cottingham | GT3 | S | 1–2 |
| (United Kingdom) Ram Racing | Mercedes-AMG GT3 Evo | Mercedes-AMG M159 6.2 L V8 | 69 | (United Kingdom) Sam De Haan | GT3 | S | 1–2 |
| (United Kingdom) Ram Racing | Mercedes-AMG GT3 Evo | Mercedes-AMG M159 6.2 L V8 | 88 | (United Kingdom) Tom Onslow-Cole | GT3 | PA | 7–8 |
| (United Kingdom) Ram Racing | Mercedes-AMG GT3 Evo | Mercedes-AMG M159 6.2 L V8 | 88 | (Macau) Kevin Tse | GT3 | PA | 7–8 |
| (United Kingdom) Beechdean AMR | Aston Martin Vantage AMR GT3 | Aston Martin 4.0 L Turbo V8 | 7 | (United Kingdom) Jonathan Adam | GT3 | PA | 1–3, 5–9 |
| (United Kingdom) Beechdean AMR | Aston Martin Vantage AMR GT3 | Aston Martin 4.0 L Turbo V8 | 7 | (United Kingdom) Andrew Howard | GT3 | PA | All |
| (United Kingdom) Beechdean AMR | Aston Martin Vantage AMR GT3 | Aston Martin 4.0 L Turbo V8 | 7 | (United Kingdom) Ross Gunn | GT3 | PA | 4 |
| (United Kingdom) Team ABBA Racing | Mercedes-AMG GT3 | Mercedes-AMG M159 6.2 L V8 | 8 | (United Kingdom) Richard Neary | GT3 | S | 1–4, 7–9 |
| (United Kingdom) Team ABBA Racing | Mercedes-AMG GT3 | Mercedes-AMG M159 6.2 L V8 | 8 | (United Kingdom) Sam Neary | GT3 | S | 1–4, 7–9 |
| (Germany) Leipert Motorsport | Lamborghini Huracán GT3 Evo | Lamborghini 5.2 L V10 | 10 | (Germany) Fidel Leib | GT3 | S | 4 |
| (Germany) Leipert Motorsport | Lamborghini Huracán GT3 Evo | Lamborghini 5.2 L V10 | 10 | (New Zealand) Brendon Leitch | GT3 | S | 4 |
| (United Kingdom) JRM Racing/ Paddock Motorsport (Note: No. 11 Bentley Continental GT3 started as JRM Bentley for round 1, however, in timing sheets and entry lists for round 2 & 3, is listed as Paddock Motorsport.) | Bentley Continental GT3 | Bentley 4.0 L Turbo V8 | 11 | (United Kingdom) Kelvin Fletcher | GT3 | PA | 1–3, 5–9 |
| (United Kingdom) JRM Racing/ Paddock Motorsport | Bentley Continental GT3 | Bentley 4.0 L Turbo V8 | 11 | (United Kingdom) Martin Plowman | GT3 | PA | 1–3, 5–9 |
| (Bahrain) 2 Seas Motorsport | Mercedes-AMG GT3 Evo | Mercedes-AMG M159 6.2 L V8 | 14 | (United Kingdom) Hunter Abbott | GT3 | PA | 2 |
| (Bahrain) 2 Seas Motorsport | Mercedes-AMG GT3 Evo | Mercedes-AMG M159 6.2 L V8 | 14 | (Croatia) Martin Kodrić | GT3 | PA | 2 |
| (United Kingdom) TF Sport | Aston Martin Vantage AMR GT3 | Aston Martin 4.0 L Turbo V8 | 38 | (Republic of Ireland) Charlie Eastwood | GT3 | PA | 2 |
| (United Kingdom) TF Sport | Aston Martin Vantage AMR GT3 | Aston Martin 4.0 L Turbo V8 | 38 | (Italy) Giacomo Petrobelli | GT3 | PA | 2 |
| (United Kingdom) TF Sport | Aston Martin Vantage AMR GT3 | Aston Martin 4.0 L Turbo V8 | 95 | (United Kingdom) Bonamy Grimes | GT3 | PA | 2 |
| (United Kingdom) TF Sport | Aston Martin Vantage AMR GT3 | Aston Martin 4.0 L Turbo V8 | 95 | (Denmark) Marco Sørensen | GT3 | PA | 2 |
| Oman Racing Team with TF Sport | Aston Martin Vantage AMR GT3 | Aston Martin 4.0 L Turbo V8 | 97 | (Republic of Ireland) Charlie Eastwood | GT3 | PA | 5–6 |
| Oman Racing Team with TF Sport | Aston Martin Vantage AMR GT3 | Aston Martin 4.0 L Turbo V8 | 97 | (Oman) Ahmad Al Harthy | GT3 | PA | 5–6 |
| (United Kingdom) WPI Motorsport | Lamborghini Huracán GT3 Evo | Lamborghini 5.2 L V10 | 18 | (United Kingdom) Michael Igoe | GT3 | PA | All |
| (United Kingdom) WPI Motorsport | Lamborghini Huracán GT3 Evo | Lamborghini 5.2 L V10 | 18 | (United Kingdom) Phil Keen | GT3 | PA | All |
| (United Kingdom) Jenson Team Rocket RJN | McLaren 720S GT3 | McLaren M840T 4.0 L Turbo V8 | 21 | (Sweden) Mia Flewitt | GT3 | PA | 2, 4, 9 |
| (United Kingdom) Jenson Team Rocket RJN | McLaren 720S GT3 | McLaren M840T 4.0 L Turbo V8 | 21 | (United Kingdom) Euan Hankey | GT3 | PA | 2, 4, 9 |
| (United Kingdom) Simon Green Motorsport | Lamborghini Huracán GT3 Evo | Lamborghini 5.2 L V10 | 24 | (United Kingdom) Lucky Khera | GT3 | S | 1–2 |
| (United Kingdom) Simon Green Motorsport | Lamborghini Huracán GT3 Evo | Lamborghini 5.2 L V10 | 24 | (United Kingdom) Ross Wylie | GT3 | S | 1–2 |
| (United Kingdom) Ultimate Speed | Aston Martin Vantage AMR GT3 | Aston Martin 4.0 L Turbo V8 | 26 | (United Kingdom) Michael Brown | GT3 | S | 1 |
| (United Kingdom) Ultimate Speed | Aston Martin Vantage AMR GT3 | Aston Martin 4.0 L Turbo V8 | 26 | (United Kingdom) Matt Manderson | GT3 | S | 1 |
| (United Kingdom) G-Cat Racing | Porsche 911 GT3 R | Porsche 4.0 L Flat-6 | 33 | (United Kingdom) Greg Caton | GT3 | Am | 1–2, 5–6 |
| (United Kingdom) G-Cat Racing | Porsche 911 GT3 R | Porsche 4.0 L Flat-6 | 33 | (United Kingdom) Shamus Jennings | GT3 | Am | 1–2, 5–6 |
| (United Kingdom) Team Parker Racing | Porsche 911 GT3 R | Porsche 4.0 L Flat-6 | 66 | (United Kingdom) Nick Jones | GT3 | PA | All |
| (United Kingdom) Team Parker Racing | Porsche 911 GT3 R | Porsche 4.0 L Flat-6 | 66 | (United Kingdom) Scott Malvern | GT3 | PA | All |
| (United Kingdom) Inception Racing with Optimum Motorsport | McLaren 720S GT3 | McLaren M840T 4.0 L Turbo V8 | 70 | (United States) Brendan Iribe | GT3 | PA | 2 |
| (United Kingdom) Inception Racing with Optimum Motorsport | McLaren 720S GT3 | McLaren M840T 4.0 L Turbo V8 | 70 | (United Kingdom) Ollie Millroy | GT3 | PA | 2 |
| (United Kingdom) Enduro Motorsport | McLaren 720S GT3 | McLaren M840T 4.0 L Turbo V8 | 77 | (United Kingdom) Marcus Clutton | GT3 | PA | 1–3, 5–9 |
| (United Kingdom) Enduro Motorsport | McLaren 720S GT3 | McLaren M840T 4.0 L Turbo V8 | 77 | (United Kingdom) Morgan Tillbrook | GT3 | PA | 1–3, 5–9 |
| (United Kingdom) Tolman Motorsport | Bentley Continental GT3 | Bentley 4.0 L Turbo V8 | 84 | (United Kingdom) Ian Stinton | GT3 | S | 9 |
| (United Kingdom) Tolman Motorsport | Bentley Continental GT3 | Bentley 4.0 L Turbo V8 | 84 | (United Kingdom) Jordan Witt | GT3 | S | 9 |
| (United Kingdom) FF Corse | Ferrari 488 Challenge Evo | Ferrari 3.9L Turbo V8 | 99 | (United Kingdom) Charlie Hollings | GTC | TBA | 4 |
| (United Kingdom) FF Corse | Ferrari 488 Challenge Evo | Ferrari 3.9L Turbo V8 | 99 | (United Kingdom) Omar Jackson | GTC | TBA | 4 |

| Icon | Class |
Car
| GT3 | GT3 Cars |
| GTC | GTC Cars |
Drivers
| PA | Pro-Am Cup |
| S | Silver-Am Cup |
| Am | Am Cup |

=== GT4 ===
| Team | Car | Engine | No. | Drivers | Class | Rounds |
|---|---|---|---|---|---|---|
| (United Kingdom) Jenson Team Rocket RJN | McLaren 570S GT4 | McLaren 3.8 L Turbo V8 | 2 | (United Kingdom) Jordan Collard | S | All |
| (United Kingdom) Jenson Team Rocket RJN | McLaren 570S GT4 | McLaren 3.8 L Turbo V8 | 2 | (United Kingdom) James Kell | S | All |
| (United Kingdom) Jenson Team Rocket RJN | McLaren 570S GT4 | McLaren 3.8 L Turbo V8 | 3 | (Morocco) Michael Benyahia | S | All |
| (United Kingdom) Jenson Team Rocket RJN | McLaren 570S GT4 | McLaren 3.8 L Turbo V8 | 3 | (Switzerland) Alain Valente | S | All |
| (United Kingdom) Jenson Team Rocket RJN | McLaren 570S GT4 | McLaren 3.8 L Turbo V8 | 4 | (Australia) Harry Hayek | S | All |
| (United Kingdom) Jenson Team Rocket RJN | McLaren 570S GT4 | McLaren 3.8 L Turbo V8 | 4 | (United Kingdom) Katie Milner | S | All |
| (United Kingdom) Century Motorsport | BMW M4 GT4 | BMW N55 3.0 L Twin-Turbo I6 | 9 | (United Kingdom) Andrew Gordon-Colebrooke | PA | All |
| (United Kingdom) Century Motorsport | BMW M4 GT4 | BMW N55 3.0 L Twin-Turbo I6 | 9 | (United Kingdom) Chris Salkeld | PA | All |
| (United Kingdom) Century Motorsport | BMW M4 GT4 | BMW N55 3.0 L Twin-Turbo I6 | 57 | (United Kingdom) Will Burns | S | All |
| (United Kingdom) Century Motorsport | BMW M4 GT4 | BMW N55 3.0 L Twin-Turbo I6 | 57 | (United Kingdom) Gus Burton | S | All |
| (United Kingdom) Century Motorsport | Aston Martin Vantage AMR GT4 | Aston Martin 4.0 L Turbo V8 | 71 | (United Kingdom) Bradley Ellis | PA | 9 |
| (United Kingdom) Century Motorsport | Aston Martin Vantage AMR GT4 | Aston Martin 4.0 L Turbo V8 | 71 | (United Kingdom) David Holloway | PA | 9 |
| (Japan) Toyota Gazoo Racing UK | Toyota GR Supra GT4 | BMW B58B30 3.0 L Twin Turbo I6 | 15 | (United Kingdom) John Ferguson | PA | All |
| (Japan) Toyota Gazoo Racing UK | Toyota GR Supra GT4 | BMW B58B30 3.0 L Twin Turbo I6 | 15 | (United Kingdom) Scott McKenna | PA | 1–6 |
| (Japan) Toyota Gazoo Racing UK | Toyota GR Supra GT4 | BMW B58B30 3.0 L Twin Turbo I6 | 15 | (United Kingdom) Jamie Caroline | PA | 7–9 |
| (United Kingdom) Car Gods with Ciceley Motorsport | Mercedes-AMG GT4 | Mercedes-AMG M178 4.0 L V8 | 25 | (United Kingdom) Jake Giddings | PA | 1–3, 5–8 |
| (United Kingdom) Car Gods with Ciceley Motorsport | Mercedes-AMG GT4 | Mercedes-AMG M178 4.0 L V8 | 25 | (United Kingdom) David Whitmore | PA | 1–3, 5–8 |
| (United Kingdom) Newbridge Motorsport | Aston Martin Vantage AMR GT4 | Aston Martin 4.0 L Turbo V8 | 27 | (United Kingdom) Darren Turner | PA | 2, 4–9 |
| (United Kingdom) Newbridge Motorsport | Aston Martin Vantage AMR GT4 | Aston Martin 4.0 L Turbo V8 | 27 | (United Kingdom) Matt Topham | PA | 2–9 |
| (United Kingdom) Newbridge Motorsport | Aston Martin Vantage AMR GT4 | Aston Martin 4.0 L Turbo V8 | 27 | (United Kingdom) Darren Burke | PA | 3 |
| (United Kingdom) Fox Motorsport | McLaren 570S GT4 | McLaren 3.8 L Turbo V8 | 40 | (United Kingdom) Nick Halstead | PA | 1–3, 5–9 |
| (United Kingdom) Fox Motorsport | McLaren 570S GT4 | McLaren 3.8 L Turbo V8 | 40 | (United Kingdom) Jamie Stanley | PA | 1–3, 5–9 |
| (United Kingdom) Steller Performance | Audi R8 LMS GT4 Evo | Audi 5.2 L V10 | 42 | (United Kingdom) Sennan Fielding | S | All |
| (United Kingdom) Steller Performance | Audi R8 LMS GT4 Evo | Audi 5.2 L V10 | 42 | (United Kingdom) Richard Williams | S | All |
| (United Kingdom) Assetto Motorsport | Ginetta G56 GT4 | GM LS3 6.2 L V8 | 56 | (United Kingdom) Charlie Robertson | PA | All |
| (United Kingdom) Assetto Motorsport | Ginetta G56 GT4 | GM LS3 6.2 L V8 | 56 | (United Kingdom) Mark Sansom | PA | All |
| (United Kingdom) Academy Motorsport | Ford Mustang GT4 | Ford 5.2 L Voodoo V8 | 61 | (United Kingdom) Matt Cowley | S | All |
| (United Kingdom) Academy Motorsport | Ford Mustang GT4 | Ford 5.2 L Voodoo V8 | 61 | (United Kingdom) Will Moore | S | All |
| (United Kingdom) CWS Engineering | Ginetta G56 GT4 | GM LS3 6.2 L V8 | 78 | (United Kingdom) Mike Simpson | PA | 9 |
| (United Kingdom) CWS Engineering | Ginetta G56 GT4 | GM LS3 6.2 L V8 | 78 | (United Kingdom) Colin White | PA | 9 |
| (United Kingdom) Balfe Motorsport | McLaren 570S GT4 | McLaren 3.8 L Turbo V8 | 90 | (United Kingdom) Jack Brown | S | All |
| (United Kingdom) Balfe Motorsport | McLaren 570S GT4 | McLaren 3.8 L Turbo V8 | 90 | (United Kingdom) Ashley Marshall | S | All |

| Icon | Class |
|---|---|
| PA | Pro-Am Cup |
| S | Silver Cup |
| Am | Am Cup |

== Race results ==
Bold indicates overall winner for each car class (GT3 and GT4).

=== GT3 ===
| Event | Circuit | Pole position | Pro-Am winners | Silver-Am winners | Am winners | GTC winners |
|---|---|---|---|---|---|---|
| 1 | Brands Hatch | (United Kingdom) No. 7 Beechdean AMR | **(United Kingdom) No. 18 WPI Motorsport** | (United Kingdom) No. 8 Team ABBA Racing | (United Kingdom) No. 33 G-Cat Racing | No Entrants |
| 1 | Brands Hatch | (United Kingdom) Jonathan Adam (United Kingdom) Andrew Howard | **(United Kingdom) Michael Igoe** **(United Kingdom) Phil Keen** | (United Kingdom) Richard Neary (United Kingdom) Sam Neary | (United Kingdom) Greg Caton (United Kingdom) Shamus Jennings | No Entrants |
| 2 | Silverstone | (Bahrain) No. 14 2 Seas Motorsport | **(Bahrain) No. 14 2 Seas Motorsport** | (United Kingdom) No. 69 RAM Racing | (United Kingdom) No. 33 G-Cat Racing | No Entrants |
| 2 | Silverstone | (United Kingdom) Hunter Abbott (Croatia) Martin Kodrić | **(United Kingdom) Hunter Abbott** **(Croatia) Martin Kodrić** | (United Kingdom) James Cottingham (United Kingdom) Sam De Haan | (United Kingdom) Greg Caton (United Kingdom) Shamus Jennings | No Entrants |
| 3 | Donington Park | (United Kingdom) No. 6 RAM Racing | (United Kingdom) No. 6 RAM Racing | **(United Kingdom) No. 8 Team ABBA Racing** | Did not participate | No Entrants |
| 3 | Donington Park | (Netherlands) Yelmer Buurman (United Kingdom) Ian Loggie | (Netherlands) Yelmer Buurman (United Kingdom) Ian Loggie | **(United Kingdom) Richard Neary** **(United Kingdom) Sam Neary** | Did not participate | No Entrants |
| 4 | Spa-Francorchamps | (United Kingdom) No. 63 Barwell Motorsport | **(United Kingdom) No. 63 Barwell Motorsport** | (United Kingdom) No. 5 Balfe Motorsport | Did not participate | |
| 4 | Spa-Francorchamps | (Russia) Leo Machitski (Denmark) Dennis Lind | **(Russia) Leo Machitski** **(Denmark) Dennis Lind** | (United Kingdom) Stewart Proctor (United Kingdom) Lewis Proctor | Did not participate | |
| 5 | Snetterton | No. 97 Oman Racing Team with TF Sport | **No. 97 Oman Racing Team with TF Sport** | (United Kingdom) No. 5 Balfe Motorsport | (United Kingdom) No. 33 G-Cat Racing | No Entrants |
| 5 | Snetterton | (Republic of Ireland) Charlie Eastwood (Oman) Ahmad Al Harthy | **(Republic of Ireland) Charlie Eastwood** **(Oman) Ahmad Al Harthy** | (United Kingdom) Stewart Proctor (United Kingdom) Lewis Proctor | (United Kingdom) Greg Caton (United Kingdom) Shamus Jennings | No Entrants |
| 6 | Snetterton | (United Kingdom) No. 63 Barwell Motorsport | **(United Kingdom) No. 6 RAM Racing** | (United Kingdom) No. 5 Balfe Motorsport | (United Kingdom) No. 33 G-Cat Racing | No Entrants |
| 6 | Snetterton | (Russia) Leo Machitski (Denmark) Dennis Lind | **(Netherlands) Yelmer Buurman** **(United Kingdom) Ian Loggie** | (United Kingdom) Stewart Proctor (United Kingdom) Lewis Proctor | (United Kingdom) Greg Caton (United Kingdom) Shamus Jennings | No Entrants |
| 7 | Oulton Park | (United Kingdom) No. 11 Paddock Motorsport | **(United Kingdom) No. 88 RAM Racing** | (United Kingdom) No. 8 Team ABBA Racing | Did not participate | No Entrants |
| 7 | Oulton Park | (United Kingdom) Kelvin Fletcher (United Kingdom) Martin Plowman | **(Macau) Kevin Tse** **(United Kingdom) Tom Onslow-Cole** | (United Kingdom) Richard Neary (United Kingdom) Sam Neary | Did not participate | No Entrants |
| 8 | Oulton Park | (United Kingdom) No. 66 Team Parker Racing | **(United Kingdom) No. 18 WPI Motorsport** | (United Kingdom) No. 8 Team ABBA Racing | Did not participate | No Entrants |
| 8 | Oulton Park | (United Kingdom) Nick Jones (United Kingdom) Scott Malvern | **(United Kingdom) Michael Igoe** **(United Kingdom) Phil Keen** | (United Kingdom) Richard Neary (United Kingdom) Sam Neary | Did not participate | No Entrants |
| 9 | Donington Park | (United Kingdom) No. 18 WPI Motorsport | (United Kingdom) No. 77 Enduro Motorsport | **(United Kingdom) No. 8 Team ABBA Racing** | Did not participate | No Entrants |
| 9 | Donington Park | (United Kingdom) Michael Igoe (United Kingdom) Phil Keen | (United Kingdom) Marcus Clutton (United Kingdom) Morgan Tillbrook | **(United Kingdom) Richard Neary** **(United Kingdom) Sam Neary** | Did not participate | No Entrants |

=== GT4 ===
| Event | Circuit | Pole position | Pro-Am winners | Silver winners |
|---|---|---|---|---|
| 1 | Brands Hatch | (United Kingdom) No. 57 Century Motorsport | (United Kingdom) No. 9 Century Motorsport | **(United Kingdom) No. 57 Century Motorsport** |
| 1 | Brands Hatch | (United Kingdom) Will Burns (United Kingdom) Gus Burton | (United Kingdom) Andrew Gordon-Colebrook (United Kingdom) Chris Salkeld | **(United Kingdom) Will Burns** **(United Kingdom) Gus Burton** |
| 2 | Silverstone | (United Kingdom) No. 42 Steller Motorsport | **(United Kingdom) No. 27 Newbridge Motorsport** | (United Kingdom) No. 42 Steller Motorsport |
| 2 | Silverstone | (United Kingdom) Sennan Fielding (United Kingdom) Richard Williams | **(United Kingdom) Darren Turner** **(United Kingdom) Matt Topham** | (United Kingdom) Sennan Fielding (United Kingdom) Richard Williams |
| 3 | Donington Park | (United Kingdom) No. 27 Newbridge Motorsport | (United Kingdom) No. 9 Century Motorsport | **(United Kingdom) No. 57 Century Motorsport** |
| 3 | Donington Park | (United Kingdom) Matt Topham (United Kingdom) Darren Burke | (United Kingdom) Andrew Gordon-Colebrook (United Kingdom) Chris Salkeld | **(United Kingdom) Will Burns** **(United Kingdom) Gus Burton** |
| 4 | Spa-Francorchamps | (Japan) No. 15 Toyota Gazoo Racing UK | (United Kingdom) No. 27 Newbridge Motorsport | **(United Kingdom) No. 90 Balfe Motorsport** |
| 4 | Spa-Francorchamps | (United Kingdom) John Ferguson (United Kingdom) Scott McKenna | (United Kingdom) Darren Turner (United Kingdom) Matt Topham | **(United Kingdom) Ashley Marshall** **(United Kingdom) Jack Brown** |
| 5 | Snetterton | (United Kingdom) No. 3 Jenson Team Rocket RJN | (Japan) No. 15 Toyota Gazoo Racing UK | **(United Kingdom) No. 2 Jenson Team Rocket RJN** |
| 5 | Snetterton | (Switzerland) Alain Valente (Morocco) Michael Benyahia | (United Kingdom) John Ferguson (United Kingdom) Scott McKenna | **(United Kingdom) James Kell** **(United Kingdom) Jordan Collard** |
| 6 | Snetterton | (United Kingdom) No. 56 Assetto Motorsport | (United Kingdom) No. 40 Fox Motorsport | **(United Kingdom) No. 61 Academy Motorsport** |
| 6 | Snetterton | (United Kingdom) Mark Sansom (United Kingdom) Charlie Robertson | (United Kingdom) Nick Halstead (United Kingdom) Jamie Stanley | **(United Kingdom) Matt Cowley** **(United Kingdom) Will Moore** |
| 7 | Oulton Park | (United Kingdom) No. 27 Newbridge Motorsport | **(United Kingdom) No. 27 Newbridge Motorsport** | (United Kingdom) No. 57 Century Motorsport |
| 7 | Oulton Park | (United Kingdom) Matt Topham (United Kingdom) Darren Turner | **(United Kingdom) Matt Topham** **(United Kingdom) Darren Turner** | (United Kingdom) Will Burns (United Kingdom) Gus Burton |
| 8 | Oulton Park | (United Kingdom) No. 27 Newbridge Motorsport | (United Kingdom) No. 56 Assetto Motorsport | **(United Kingdom) No. 57 Century Motorsport** |
| 8 | Oulton Park | (United Kingdom) Matt Topham (United Kingdom) Darren Turner | (United Kingdom) Mark Sansom (United Kingdom) Charlie Robertson | **(United Kingdom) Will Burns** **(United Kingdom) Gus Burton** |
| 9 | Donington Park | (United Kingdom) No. 61 Academy Motorsport | (United Kingdom) No. 40 Fox Motorsport | (United Kingdom) No. 61 Academy Motorsport |
| 9 | Donington Park | (United Kingdom) Matt Cowley (United Kingdom) Will Moore | (United Kingdom) Nick Halstead (United Kingdom) Jamie Stanley | (United Kingdom) Matt Cowley (United Kingdom) Will Moore |

== Championship standings ==
Points were awarded as follows:

| Length | 1st | 2nd | 3rd | 4th | 5th | 6th | 7th | 8th | 9th | 10th |
|---|---|---|---|---|---|---|---|---|---|---|
| 1 hour | 25 | 18 | 15 | 12 | 10 | 8 | 6 | 4 | 2 | 1 |
| 2+ hours | 37.5 | 27 | 22.5 | 18 | 15 | 12 | 9 | 6 | 3 | 1.5 |

=== Drivers' championships ===
==== Overall ====
| Pos. | Drivers | Team | BRH | SIL | DON | SPA | SNE | | OUL | | DON | Points |
GT3
| 1 | (Denmark) Dennis Lind (Russia) Leo Machitski | (United Kingdom) Barwell Motorsport | 3 | 3 | Ret | **1** | 3 | **5** | 3 | 4 | 4 | 172 |
| 2 | (Netherlands) Yelmer Buurman (United Kingdom) Ian Loggie | (United Kingdom) Ram Racing | 4 | 5 | **2** | 13 | 8 | 1 | 7 | 3 | 2 | 162.5 |
| 3 | (United Kingdom) Adam Balon (United Kingdom) Sandy Mitchell | (United Kingdom) Barwell Motorsport | 12 | 2 | 5 | 5 | 5 | 2 | 6 | 2 | 5 | 142.5 |
| 4 | (United Kingdom) Michael Igoe (United Kingdom) Phil Keen | (United Kingdom) WPI Motorsport | 1 | 11 | Ret | 2 | 7 | 3 | 5 | 1 | **10** | 135 |
| 5 | (United Kingdom) Andrew Howard | (United Kingdom) Beechdean AMR | **2** | 6 | 3 | 4 | 4 | 6 | 9 | 9 | 7 | 129.5 |
| 6 | (United Kingdom) Jonathan Adam | (United Kingdom) Beechdean AMR | **2** | 6 | 3 | | 4 | 6 | 9 | 9 | 7 | 111.5 |
| 7 | (United Kingdom) Lewis Proctor (United Kingdom) Stewart Proctor | (United Kingdom) Balfe Motorsport | 8 | 10 | 6 | 3 | 6 | 7 | 8 | 8 | 8 | 87.5 |
| 8 | (United Kingdom) Richard Neary (United Kingdom) Sam Neary | (United Kingdom) Team ABBA Racing | 5 | Ret | 1 | Ret | | | DSQ | DSQ | 3 | 75 |
| 9 | (United Kingdom) Marcus Clutton (United Kingdom) Morgan Tillbrook | (United Kingdom) Enduro Motorsport | Ret | Ret | 4 | | DSQ | 18 | 10 | 6 | 1 | 67.5 |
| 10 | (United Kingdom) Nick Jones (United Kingdom) Scott Malvern | (United Kingdom) Team Parker Racing | 6 | 9 | Ret | WD | | Ret | 3 | **5** | 6 | 64 |
| 11 | (United Kingdom) Kelvin Fletcher (United Kingdom) Martin Plowman | (United Kingdom) JRM Racing | 7 | 25 | 7 | | 2 | 8 | **10** | 10 | 9 | 59.5 |
| 12 | (United Kingdom) Ross Gunn | (United Kingdom) Beechdean AMR | | | | 4 | | | | | | 18 |
| 13 | (United Kingdom) James Cottingham (United Kingdom) Sam De Haan | (United Kingdom) Ram Racing | Ret | 8 | | | | | | | | 15 |
| 14 | (United Kingdom) Greg Caton (United Kingdom) Shamus Jennings | (United Kingdom) G-Cat Racing | 9 | 13 | | | 9 | 9 | | | | 14 |
| 15 | (United Kingdom) Lucky Khera (United Kingdom) Ross Wylie | (United Kingdom) Simon Green Motorsport | 10 | | | | | | | | | 1.5 |
| NC | (United Kingdom) Michael Brown (United Kingdom) Matt Manderson | (United Kingdom) Ultimate Speed | 11 | | | | | | | | | 0 |
Drivers ineligible to score points
| | (United Kingdom) Hunter Abbott (Croatia) Martin Kodrić | (Bahrain) 2 Seas Motorsport | | **1** | | | | | | | | – |
| | (Italy) Giacomo Petrobelli | (United Kingdom) TF Sport; Oman Racing Team with TF Sport | | 4 | | | | | | | | – |
| | (Republic of Ireland) Charlie Eastwood | (United Kingdom) TF Sport; Oman Racing Team with TF Sport | | 4 | | | **1** | 4 | | | | – |
| | (Oman) Ahmad Al Harthy | (United Kingdom) TF Sport; Oman Racing Team with TF Sport | | | | | **1** | 4 | | | | – |
| | (United Kingdom) Bonamy Grimes (Denmark) Marco Sørensen | (United Kingdom) TF Sport | | 7 | | | | | | | | – |
| | (Sweden) Mia Flewitt (United Kingdom) Euan Hankey | (United Kingdom) Jenson Team Rocket RJN | | 12 | | | | | | | | – |
| | (United States) Brendan Iribe (United Kingdom) Ollie Millroy | (United Kingdom) Inception Racing with Optimum Motorsport | | Ret | | | | | | | | – |
GT4
| 1 | (United Kingdom) Will Burns (United Kingdom) Gus Burton | (United Kingdom) Century Motorsport | **13** | 17 | 8 | 8 | 11 | 14 | 12 | 9 | 15 | 209 |
| 2 | (United Kingdom) Matt Cowley (United Kingdom) Will Moore | (United Kingdom) Academy Motorsport | Ret | 20 | Ret | 9 | 15 | 10 | Ret | 11 | 13 | 112.5 |
| 3 | (United Kingdom) Jordan Collard (United Kingdom) James Kell | (United Kingdom) Jenson Team Rocket RJN | 15 | 22 | 12 | | 10 | 13 | 14 | 10 | | 107.5 |
| 4 | (United Kingdom) Matt Topham | (United Kingdom) Newbridge Motorsport | | 14 | Ret | 7 | 20 | 19 | **11** | 19 | 17 | 106.5 |
| 4 | (United Kingdom) Darren Turner | (United Kingdom) Newbridge Motorsport | | 14 | | 7 | 20 | 19 | **11** | 19 | 17 | 106.5 |
| 5 | (United Kingdom) Chris Salkeld (United Kingdom) Andrew Gordon-Colebrooke | (United Kingdom) Century Motorsport | 14 | 19 | 9 | 10 | Ret | 11 | Ret | 17 | 24 | 102.5 |
| 6 | (United Kingdom) Ashley Marshall (United Kingdom) Jack Brown | (United Kingdom) Balfe Motorsport | 19 | 27 | Ret | 6 | 16 | 16 | Ret | 12 | 20 | 79.5 |
| 7 | (United Kingdom) Richard Williams (United Kingdom) Sennan Fielding | (United Kingdom) Steller Motorsport | 17 | **15** | Ret | 11 | Ret | | 13 | 15 | 23 | 78 |
| 8 | (Morocco) Michael Benyahia (Switzerland) Alain Valente | (United Kingdom) Jenson Team Rocket RJN | Ret | 21 | Ret | Ret | **19** | 12 | 16 | 13 | 14 | 67 |
| 9 | (United Kingdom) Nick Halstead (United Kingdom) Jamie Stanley | (United Kingdom) Fox Motorsport | 18 | 24 | 10 | | 17 | 17 | 17 | 20 | 16 | 66.5 |
| 10 | (United Kingdom) Mark Sansom (United Kingdom) Charlie Robertson | (United Kingdom) Assetto Motorsport | 16 | 18 | Ret | Ret | 14 | **Ret** | 15 | 16 | 21 | 63 |
| 11 | (United Kingdom) Katie Milner (Australia) Harry Hayek | (United Kingdom) Jenson Team Rocket RJN | 20 | 26 | Ret | 12 | 13 | 15 | 19 | 14 | 19 | 57 |
| 12 | (United Kingdom) John Ferguson | (Japan) Toyota Gazoo Racing UK | Ret | 16 | Ret | 14 | 12 | Ret | 18 | 18 | | 48.5 |
| 13 | (United Kingdom) Scott McKenna | (Japan) Toyota Gazoo Racing UK | Ret | 16 | Ret | 14 | 12 | Ret | | | | 43.5 |
| 14 | (United Kingdom) David Whitmore (United Kingdom) Jake Giddings | (United Kingdom) Car Gods with Ciceley Motorsport | 21 | 23 | 11 | | 18 | Ret | Ret | | | 24.5 |
| 15 | (United Kingdom) Jamie Caroline | (Japan) Toyota Gazoo Racing UK | | | | | | | 18 | 18 | | 5 |
| Pos. | Drivers | Team | BRH | SIL | DON | SPA | SNE | | OUL | | DON | Points |

| Colour | Result |
|---|---|
| Gold | Winner |
| Silver | Second place |
| Bronze | Third place |
| Green | Points classification |
| Blue | Non-points classification |
| Blue | Non-classified finish (NC) |
| Purple | Retired, not classified (Ret) |
| Red | Did not qualify (DNQ) |
| Red | Did not pre-qualify (DNPQ) |
| Black | Disqualified (DSQ) |
| White | Did not start (DNS) |
| White | Withdrew (WD) |
| White | Race cancelled (C) |
| Blank | Did not practice (DNP) |
| Blank | Did not arrive (DNA) |
| Blank | Excluded (EX) |

**Bold** indicates pole position

==== Pro-Am Cup ====
| Pos. | Drivers | Team | BRH | SIL | DON | SPA | SNE | | OUL | | DON | Points |
GT3
| 1 | (Netherlands) Yelmer Buurman (United Kingdom) Ian Loggie | (United Kingdom) Ram Racing | 4 | 5 | 2 | 13 | 8 | 1 | 6 | 3 | 2 | 178 |
| 2 | (Denmark) Dennis Lind (Russia) Leo Machitski | (United Kingdom) Barwell Motorsport | 3 | 3 | Ret | 1 | 3 | 5 | 2 | 4 | 4 | 176.5 |
| 3 | (United Kingdom) Adam Balon (United Kingdom) Sandy Mitchell | (United Kingdom) Barwell Motorsport | 12 | 2 | 5 | 5 | 5 | 2 | 5 | 2 | 5 | 160.5 |
| 4 | (United Kingdom) Michael Igoe (United Kingdom) Phil Keen | (United Kingdom) WPI Motorsport | 1 | 11 | Ret | 2 | 7 | 3 | 4 | 1 | 12 | 147.5 |
| 5 | (United Kingdom) Andrew Howard | (United Kingdom) Beechdean AMR | **2** | 6 | 3 | 4 | 4 | 6 | 8 | 8 | 8 | 145.5 |
| 6 | (United Kingdom) Jonathan Adam | (United Kingdom) Beechdean AMR | **2** | 6 | 3 | | 4 | 6 | 8 | 8 | 8 | 123 |
| 7 | (United Kingdom) Kelvin Fletcher (United Kingdom) Martin Plowman | (United Kingdom) JRM Racing | 7 | 25 | 7 | | 2 | 8 | 9 | 22 | 10 | 88 |
| 8 | (United Kingdom) Marcus Clutton (United Kingdom) Morgan Tillbrook | (United Kingdom) Enduro Motorsport | Ret | Ret | 4 | | DSQ | 18 | 10 | 6 | 1 | 78 |
| 9 | (United Kingdom) Nick Jones (United Kingdom) Scott Malvern | (United Kingdom) Team Parker Racing | 6 | 9 | Ret | WD | | Ret | 3 | 5 | 6 | 73 |
| 10 | (United Kingdom) Ross Gunn | (United Kingdom) Beechdean AMR | | | | 4 | | | | | | 22.5 |
GT4
| 1 | (United Kingdom) Matt Topham | (United Kingdom) Newbridge Motorsport | | 14 | Ret | 7 | 20 | 19 | 11 | 19 | 17 | 170 |
| 1 | (United Kingdom) Darren Turner | (United Kingdom) Newbridge Motorsport | | 14 | | 7 | 20 | 19 | 11 | 19 | 17 | 170 |
| 2 | (United Kingdom) Nick Halstead (United Kingdom) Jamie Stanley | (United Kingdom) Fox Motorsport | 18 | 24 | 10 | | 17 | 17 | 17 | 20 | 16 | 166 |
| 3 | (United Kingdom) Mark Sansom (United Kingdom) Charlie Robertson | (United Kingdom) Assetto Motorsport | 16 | 18 | Ret | Ret | 14 | Ret | 15 | 16 | 21 | 133 |
| 4 | (United Kingdom) John Ferguson | (Japan) Toyota Gazoo Racing UK | Ret | 16 | Ret | 14 | 12 | Ret | 18 | 18 | Ret | 109 |
| 5 | (United Kingdom) Chris Salkeld (United Kingdom) Andrew Gordon-Colebrooke | (United Kingdom) Century Motorsport | 14 | 19 | 9 | | | | | | | 93 |
| 6 | (United Kingdom) Scott McKenna | (Japan) Toyota Gazoo Racing UK | Ret | 16 | Ret | 14 | 12 | Ret | | | | 79 |
| 7 | (United Kingdom) David Whitmore (United Kingdom) Jake Giddings | (United Kingdom) Car Gods with Ciceley Motorsport | 21 | 23 | 11 | | 18 | Ret | Ret | | | 67.5 |
| 8 | (United Kingdom) Jamie Caroline | (Japan) Toyota Gazoo Racing UK | | | | | | | 18 | 18 | Ret | 30 |
| Pos. | Drivers | Team | BRH | SIL | DON | SPA | SNE | | OUL | | DON | Points |

==== Silver Cup ====
| Pos. | Drivers | Team | BRH | SIL | DON | SPA | SNE | | OUL | | DON | Points |
GT3
| 1 | (United Kingdom) Lewis Proctor (United Kingdom) Stewart Proctor | (United Kingdom) Balfe Motorsport | 8 | 10 | 6 | 3 | 6 | 7 | 7 | 7 | 9 | 149.75 |
| 2 | (United Kingdom) Richard Neary (United Kingdom) Sam Neary | (United Kingdom) Team ABBA Racing | 5 | Ret | 1 | Ret | | | DSQ | DSQ | 3 | 75 |
| 3 | (United Kingdom) James Cottingham (United Kingdom) Sam De Haan | (United Kingdom) Ram Racing | Ret | 8 | | | | | | | | 37.5 |
| 4 | (United Kingdom) Lucky Khera (United Kingdom) Ross Wylie | (United Kingdom) Simon Green Motorsport | 10 | | | | | | | | | 22.5 |
| 5 | (United Kingdom) Michael Brown (United Kingdom) Matt Manderson | (United Kingdom) Ultimate Speed | 11 | | | | | | | | | 18 |
GT4
| 1 | (United Kingdom) Will Burns (United Kingdom) Gus Burton | (United Kingdom) Century Motorsport | 13 | 17 | 8 | 8 | 11 | 14 | 12 | 9 | 15 | 229.5 |
| 2 | (United Kingdom) Jordan Collard (United Kingdom) James Kell | (United Kingdom) Jenson Team Rocket RJN | 15 | 22 | 12 | | 10 | 13 | 14 | 10 | Ret | 139 |
| 3 | (United Kingdom) Matt Cowley (United Kingdom) Will Moore | (United Kingdom) Academy Motorsport | Ret | 20 | Ret | 9 | 15 | 10 | Ret | 11 | 13 | 134.5 |
| 4 | (United Kingdom) Richard Williams (United Kingdom) Sennan Fielding | (United Kingdom) Steller Motorsport | 17 | 15 | Ret | 11 | Ret | | 13 | 15 | 23 | 111 |
| 5 | (United Kingdom) Ashley Marshall (United Kingdom) Jack Brown | (United Kingdom) Balfe Motorsport | 19 | 27 | Ret | 6 | 16 | 16 | Ret | 12 | 20 | 107.5 |
| 6 | (United Kingdom) Katie Milner (Australia) Harry Hayek | (United Kingdom) Jenson Team Rocket RJN | 20 | 26 | Ret | 12 | 13 | 15 | 19 | 14 | 19 | 98 |
| 7 | (Morocco) Michael Benyahia (Switzerland) Alain Valente | (United Kingdom) Jenson Team Rocket RJN | Ret | 21 | Ret | Ret | 19 | 12 | 16 | 13 | 14 | 90 |
| 8 | (United Kingdom) Chris Salkeld (United Kingdom) Andrew Gordon-Colebrooke | (United Kingdom) Century Motorsport | | | | 10 | Ret | 11 | Ret | 17 | 24 | 49 |
| Pos. | Drivers | Team | BRH | SIL | DON | SPA | SNE | | OUL | | DON | Points |

=== Teams' championship ===
| Pos. | Team | Manufacturer | No. | BRH | SIL | DON | SPA | SNE | | OUL | | DON | Points |
GT3
| 1 | (United Kingdom) Barwell Motorsport | Lamborghini | 1 | 12 | 2 | 5 | 5 | 5 | 2 | 5 | 2 | 5 | 314.5 |
| 1 | (United Kingdom) Barwell Motorsport | Lamborghini | 63 | 3 | 3 | Ret | 1 | 3 | 5 | 2 | 4 | 4 | 314.5 |
| 2 | (United Kingdom) Ram Racing | Mercedes-AMG | 6 | 4 | 5 | 2 | 13 | 8 | 1 | 6 | 3 | 2 | 177.5 |
| 2 | (United Kingdom) Ram Racing | Mercedes-AMG | 69 | Ret | 8 | | | | | | | | 177.5 |
| 3 | (United Kingdom) WPI Motorsport | Lamborghini | 18 | 1 | 11 | Ret | 2 | 7 | 3 | 4 | 1 | 12 | 135 |
| 4 | (United Kingdom) Beechdean AMR | Aston Martin | 7 | 2 | 6 | 3 | 4 | 4 | 6 | 8 | 8 | 8 | 129.5 |
| 5 | (United Kingdom) Balfe Motorsport | McLaren | 5 | 8 | 10 | 6 | 3 | 6 | 7 | 7 | 7 | 9 | 87.5 |
| 6 | (United Kingdom) Team ABBA Racing | Mercedes-AMG | 8 | 5 | Ret | 1 | Ret | | | DSQ | DSQ | 3 | 75 |
| 7 | (United Kingdom) Enduro Motorsport | McLaren | 77 | Ret | Ret | 4 | | DSQ | 18 | 10 | 6 | 1 | 67.5 |
| 8 | (United Kingdom) Team Parker Racing | Porsche | 66 | 6 | 9 | Ret | | | Ret | 3 | 5 | 6 | 64 |
| 9 | (United Kingdom) JRM Racing / Paddock Motorsport | Bentley | 11 | 7 | 25 | 7 | | 2 | 8 | 9 | 22 | 10 | 50.5 |
| 10 | (United Kingdom) G-Cat Racing | Porsche | 33 | 9 | 13 | | | 9 | 9 | | | | 14 |
| 11 | (United Kingdom) Simon Green Motorsport | Lamborghini | 24 | 10 | | | | | | | | | 1.5 |
GT4
| 1 | (United Kingdom) Century Motorsport | BMW | 9 | 14 | 19 | 9 | 10 | | 11 | Ret | 17 | 24 | 313.5 |
| 1 | (United Kingdom) Century Motorsport | BMW | 57 | 13 | 17 | 8 | 8 | 11 | 14 | 12 | 9 | 15 | 313.5 |
| 2 | (United Kingdom) Jenson Team Rocket RJN | McLaren | 2 | 15 | 22 | 12 | | 10 | 13 | 14 | 10 | Ret | 212.5 |
| 2 | (United Kingdom) Jenson Team Rocket RJN | McLaren | 3 | | 21 | Ret | Ret | 13 | 12 | 16 | 13 | 14 | 212.5 |
| 2 | (United Kingdom) Jenson Team Rocket RJN | McLaren | 4 | 20 | 26 | Ret | 12 | 19 | 15 | 19 | 14 | 19 | 212.5 |
| 3 | (United Kingdom) Academy Motorsport | Ford | 61 | | 20 | Ret | 9 | 15 | 10 | Ret | 11 | 13 | 112.5 |
| 4 | (United Kingdom) Newbridge Motorsport | Aston Martin | 27 | | 14 | Ret | 7 | 20 | 19 | 11 | 19 | 17 | 110.5 |
| 5 | (United Kingdom) Balfe Motorsport | McLaren | 90 | 19 | 27 | Ret | 6 | 16 | 16 | Ret | 12 | 20 | 81.5 |
| 6 | (United Kingdom) Steller Motorsport | Audi | 42 | 17 | 15 | Ret | 11 | | | 13 | 15 | 23 | 80 |
| 7 | (United Kingdom) Fox Motorsport | McLaren | 40 | 18 | 24 | 10 | | 17 | 17 | 17 | 20 | 16 | 68.5 |
| 8 | (United Kingdom) Assetto Motorsport | Ginetta | 56 | 16 | 18 | Ret | Ret | 14 | Ret | 15 | 16 | 21 | 68 |
| 9 | (Japan) Toyota Gazoo Racing UK | Toyota | 15 | | 16 | Ret | 14 | 12 | Ret | 18 | 18 | Ret | 49.5 |
| 10 | (United Kingdom) Car Gods with Ciceley Motorsport | Mercedes-AMG | 25 | 21 | 23 | 11 | | 18 | Ret | Ret | | | 24.5 |
| Pos. | Team | Manufacturer | No. | BRH | SIL | DON | SPA | SNE | | OUL | | DON | Points |
