= Sebastian Priaulx =

British racing driver

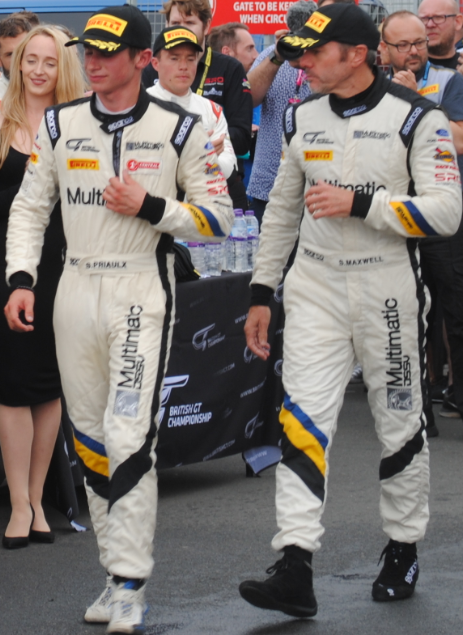
- Priaulx (left) and British GT co-driver Scott Maxwell in 2019.
- Nationality: British
- Born: 18 January 2001 (age 25) Guernsey
- Relatives: Andy Priaulx (father)

IMSA SportsCar Championship career
- Debut season: 2022
- Current team: Ford Multimatic Motorsports
- Categorisation: FIA Silver (until 2022); FIA Gold (2023–)
- Car number: 65
- Former teams: AO Racing, Sean Creech Motorsport, Inception Racing with Optimum Motorsport
- Starts: 31
- Wins: 4
- Podiums: 10
- Poles: 3
- Fastest laps: 2

Previous series
- 2021 2019 2019–2020 2018 2016–2017 2015–2016: Porsche Carrera Cup North America; British GT Championship; Michelin Pilot Challenge; F4 British Championship; Ginetta Junior Championship; Ginetta Junior Winter Series

Championship titles
- 2021 2016: Porsche Carrera Cup North America; Ginetta Junior Winter Series
- Statistics up to date as of 19 July 2025.

Sebastian "Seb" Priaulx (born 18 January 2001) is a British racing driver from Guernsey who competes for Ford Multimatic Motorsports in the IMSA SportsCar Championship. He previously drove for AO Racing in the 2024 IMSA SportsCar Championship.

== Career ==
=== Early career ===
Priaulx was introduced to motorsports at a karting track near Circuit de Nevers Magny-Cours while his father, Andy, was testing there. At the age of 8, he began competing in karts, before progressing to cars in the Ginetta Junior Winter Series at the end of 2015. He cited his early aspirations as reaching Formula 1, but began in the Ginetta ladder in lieu of Formula 4 due to its value for money.

In 2016, Priaulx graduated to the Ginetta Junior Championship at large, driving for JHR Developments. He scored his first victory in the series in September at Silverstone, adding five additional podiums over the course of the season en route to a 7th-place points finish. In the series' season-ending Winter Series, Priaulx scored two race victories at Brands Hatch, scoring the title. Priaulx returned to the championship in 2017, supported by sponsorship from 1st Central Insurance, and began the championship by winning on the opening weekend at Brands Hatch. He continued the season strongly, winning five consecutive races between the rounds at Thruxton and Croft, before parting ways with JHR Developments following their suspension from the series in August. For the Rockingham round, Priaulx joined HHC Motorsport, finishing the season as championship runner-up to Tom Gamble.

While competing in Ginettas, Priaulx worked at a car dealership to supplement his racing career.

=== Junior formula ===
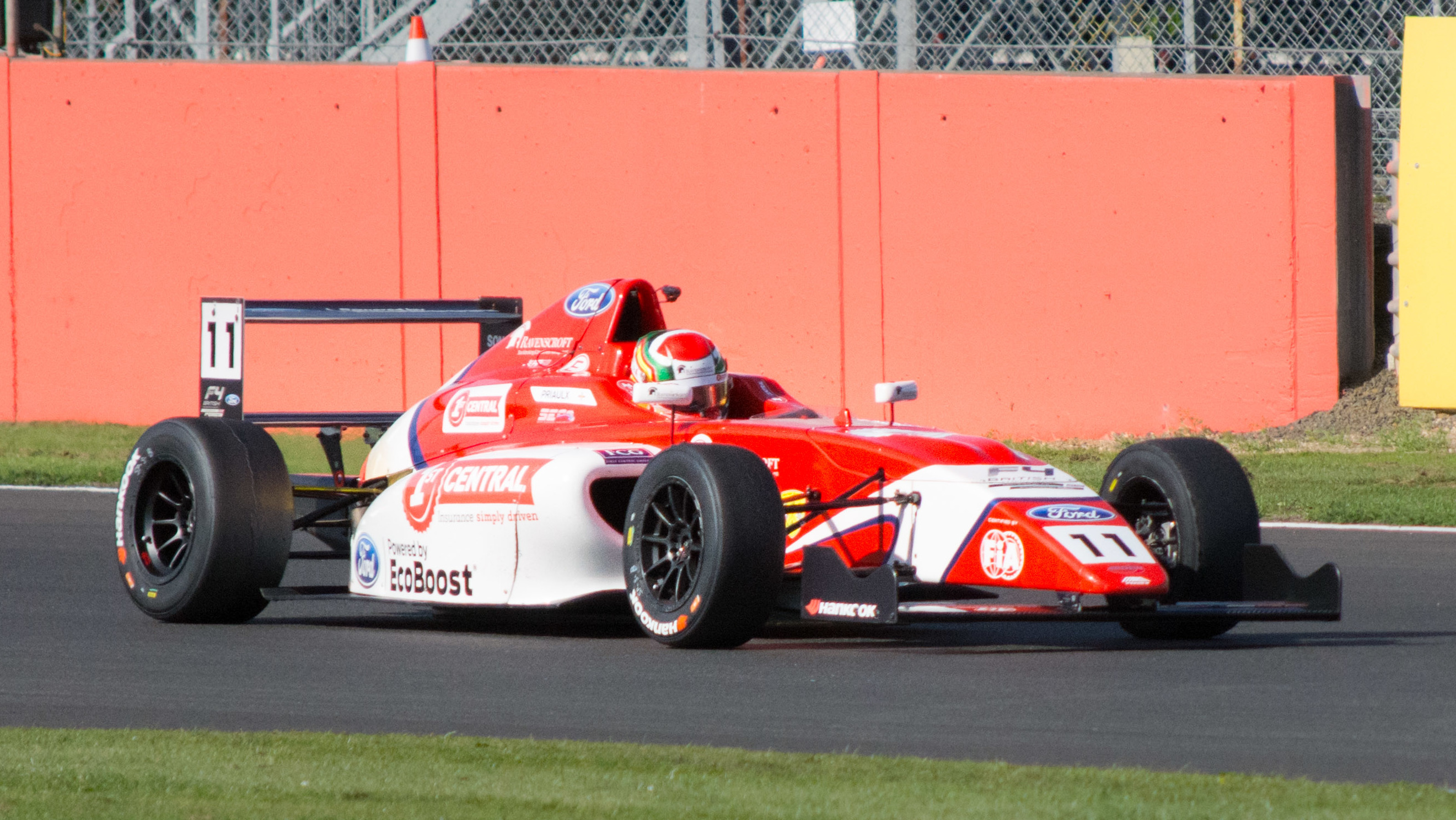
Priaulx competing in F4 at Silverstone.

Priaulx's brief junior formula career began in 2018, joining the TRS Arden team in the F4 British Championship. Supported by new sponsor Ravenscroft, his confidence was high entering the opening round at Brands Hatch, and he scored a fourth-place finish in his first race in the championship. In the second event of the weekend, he scored his maiden victory in the series, taken after the top-two finishers on the road were penalized for a jump start. Priaulx scored just one more race victory that season, in the final race meeting at Brands Hatch, finishing seventh in the championship. This was his only season in single-seaters, and he signed a deal with Multimatic Motorsports to compete in sports car racing for 2019.

=== Sports car racing ===
==== GT4 ====
Priaulx's first foray into sports car racing was the 2019 British GT Championship, joining co-driver Scott Maxwell in a Multimatic-prepared Ford Mustang GT4. The move put both Sebastian and his father Andy in same team, as Multimatic handled both Ford's GT4 and WEC-based Ford GTE program. It also came amidst changing aspirations for Sebastian, whose focus turned to eventually competing in the 24 Hours of Le Mans as opposed to reaching Formula One. In the opening round of the season, Priaulx and Maxwell claimed a pair of pole positions, taking the GT4 class victory in the second event of the weekend at Oulton Park. The duo claimed another victory at Donington Park in June, and entered the final two rounds of the season at the top of the GT4 points classification. However, a ninth place finish at Brands Hatch saw Priaulx and Maxwell fall behind eventual championship winners Tom Canning and Ashley Hand, who had claimed a podium finish. A second-place result in the final round at Donington Park wasn't enough for the Multimatic team to claim the title, as they fell 7.5 points short of the aforementioned duo of Canning and Hand.

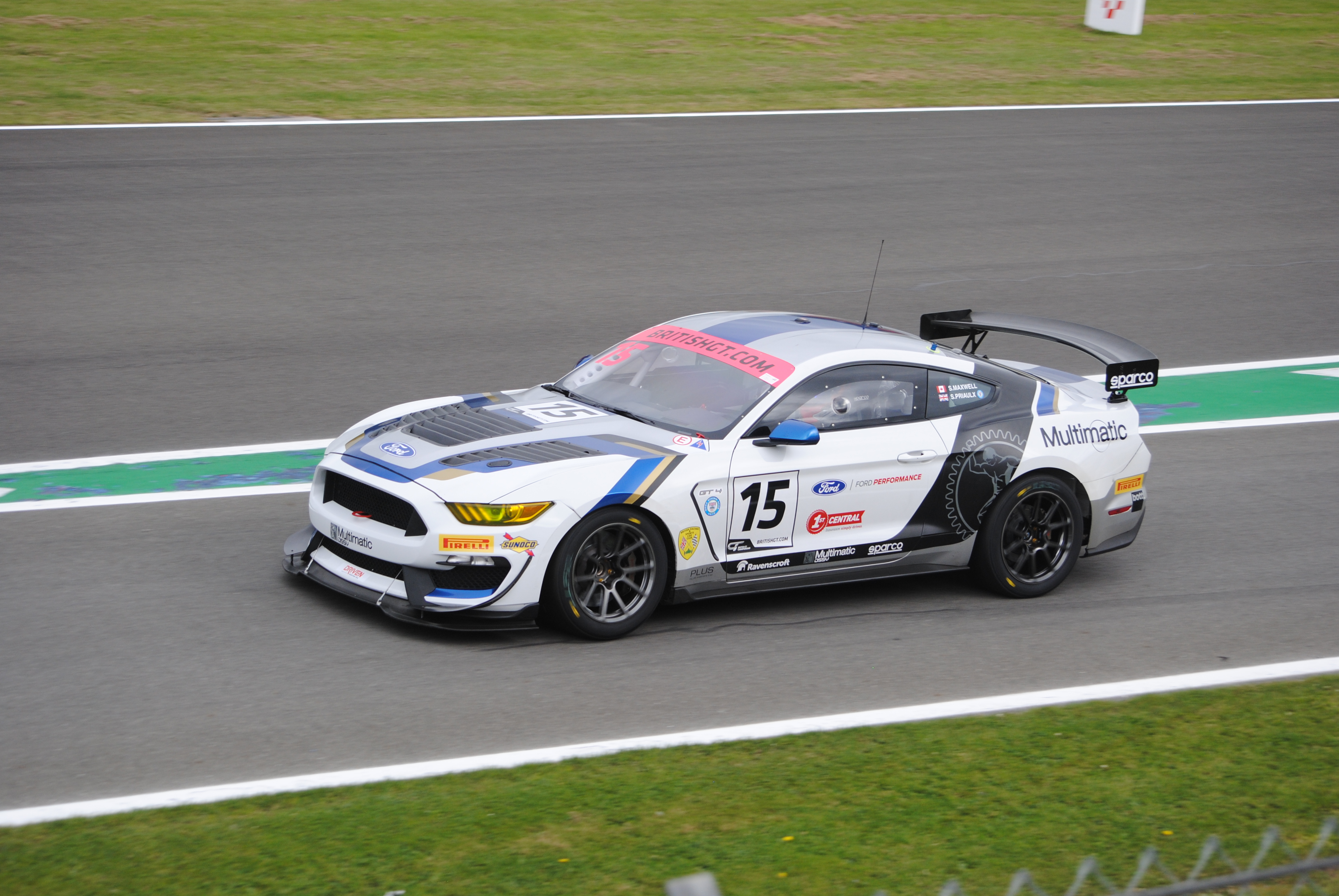
Priaulx and Maxwell's Ford Mustang GT4 at Donington Park.

Following the conclusion of the British GT season, Priaulx embarked upon his first race in North America, joining the team's Michelin Pilot Challenge entry alongside Austin Cindric for the final round of the season at Road Atlanta. Fortunate timing on a late race pit stop allowed the two to jump to the top of the Grand Sport classification, and Cindric drew out a three-second gap to the Automatic Racing entry of Tom Long and Akhil Rabindra to take the race victory.

Prior to the start of competition in 2020, Sebastian and Andy signed new long-term contracts with Multimatic; Sebastian as a driver and Andy in an advisory role. Sebastian's racing for the year took place stateside, as he once again paired with Cindric for the opening race of the 2020 Michelin Pilot Challenge at Daytona. After racing resumed following a COVID-19-induced stoppage, Priaulx was confirmed to complete the season with Multimatic in the team's #22 entry, paired with several different co-drivers. Scott Maxwell joined Priaulx between the round at Road America and the October event at Road Atlanta, while Hailie Deegan and Marco Signoretti drove at the Laguna Seca and second Sebring rounds, respectively. Priaulx claimed a lone podium at Road Atlanta in September, finishing 11th in the Grand Sport class championship.

==== Porsche single-make and WEC ====
In a partnership between Kelly-Moss Road and Race and Multimatic Motorsports, Priaulx began competing in the new-for-2021 Porsche Carrera Cup North America in its inaugural season. In pre-season testing at Sebring, designed to shake down the new Porsche 992 GT3 Cup car, Priaulx registered the quickest time of the 19 entries that took part. A half-second behind him was his Kelly-Moss teammate Kay van Berlo, foreshadowing a year-long title fight between the two drivers. In the first race at Sebring, Priaulx edged out van Berlo to take the race victory, in the process becoming the series' first ever race winner. After winning the opening race of the season, van Berlo won five of the next seven, with Priaulx taking his second win of the season in the ninth race of the season. Priaulx's victory in race one at Indianapolis saw him climb to the top of the points standings for the first time since COTA. To end the season, Priaulx claimed victory in four of the final six races, taking the Pro-class championship with one race remaining. Alongside his championship victory, Priaulx was nominated to compete in the Porsche Junior Shootout, with the top prize being a fully-funded season in the 2022 Porsche Supercup. Ahead of the 2022 season, he was named as a BRDC Superstar, granting him financial support for the 2022 calendar year.

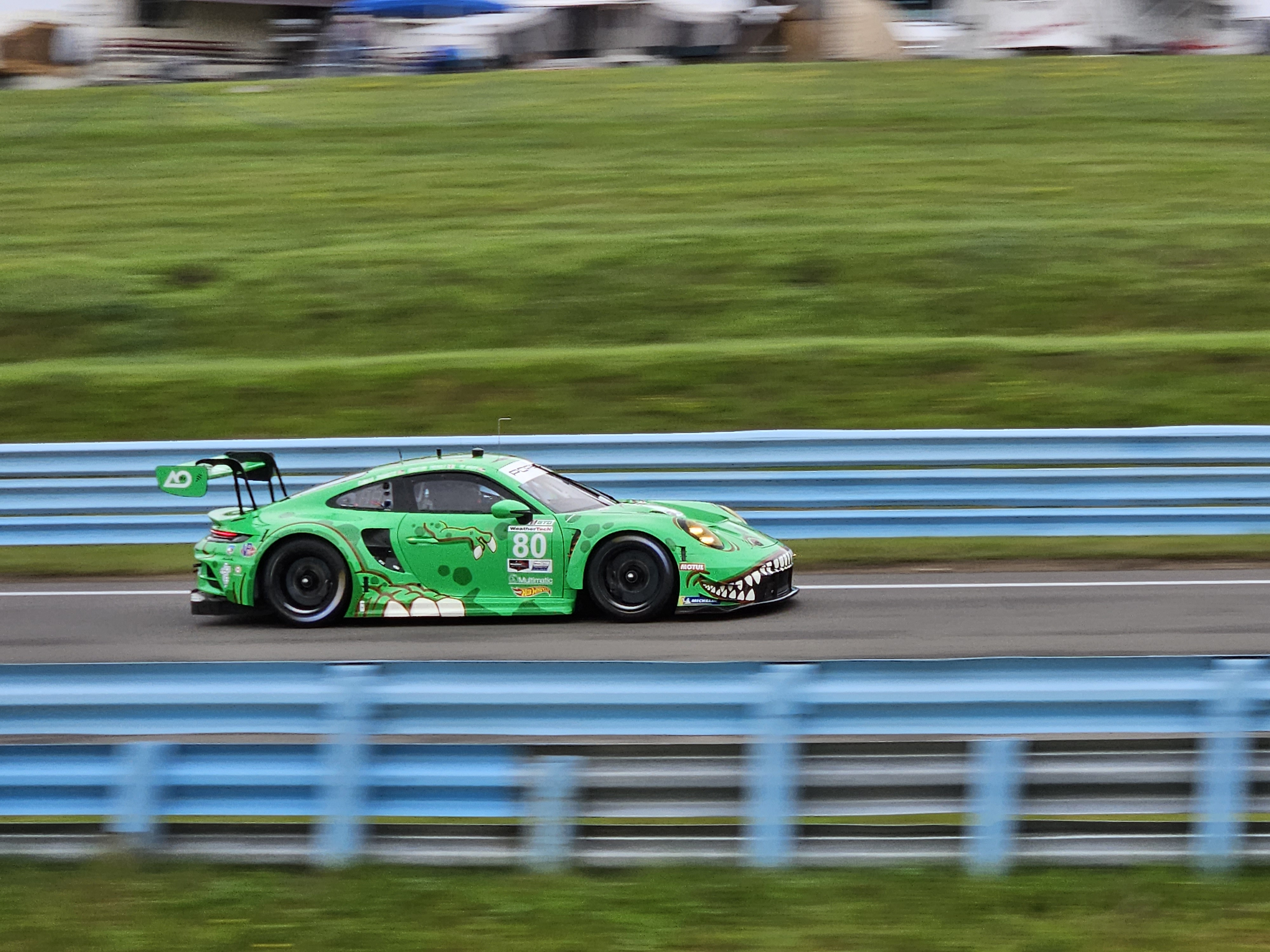
Priaulx driving at the 2023 Sahlen's Six Hours of The Glen in a Porsche 911 GT3 R commonly referred to as "Rexy".

For 2022, Priaulx embarked on a full-season campaign in the FIA World Endurance Championship, competing with Dempsey-Proton Racing. He joined team principal Christian Ried and Multimatic driver Harry Tincknell in the LM GTE Am-class Porsche. Priaulx scored his first WEC victory at the second round of the championship at Spa, before adding another at Monza in July.

During 2022, Priaulx also undertook several one-off appearances in various championships. In January, he made his debut in the IMSA SportsCar Championship, competing in the 2022 24 Hours of Daytona with Sean Creech Motorsport. The team finished the event second in class, a lap behind the class-winning #74 entry of Riley Motorsports. In July, he joined Inception Racing by Optimum Motorsport's Gold Cup entry in the Spa 24 Hours, driving alongside Brendan Iribe, Ollie Millroy, and Frederik Schandorff. The group finished fourth in the Gold Cup classification, 27th overall. Priaulx returned to Inception Racing for Petit Le Mans, joining Iribe and Jordan Pepper in the GTD entry. The team led the class for 145 laps, but finished second after being held up at the pit exit during a late stop.

For the 2023 IMSA SportsCar Championship, Priaulx joined AO Racing Team for their full-season GTD class entry, driving alongside P. J. Hyett. The duo achieved a season-high sixth-place finish at VIR, finishing 14th in the GTD class championship. AO Racing's expanded program saw Priaulx reassigned, joining Laurin Heinrich in a new GTD Pro effort. Priaulx and Heinrich were joined by Michael Christensen for the 2024 24 Hours of Daytona, in which they secured the class pole and a runner-up finish. Following a retirement at Sebring, the duo claimed consecutive victories at Laguna Seca and Detroit. Despite leading the GTD Pro championship with four races remaining, Priaulx parted ways with the team mid-season owing to his increasing commitments with Multimatic Motorsports.

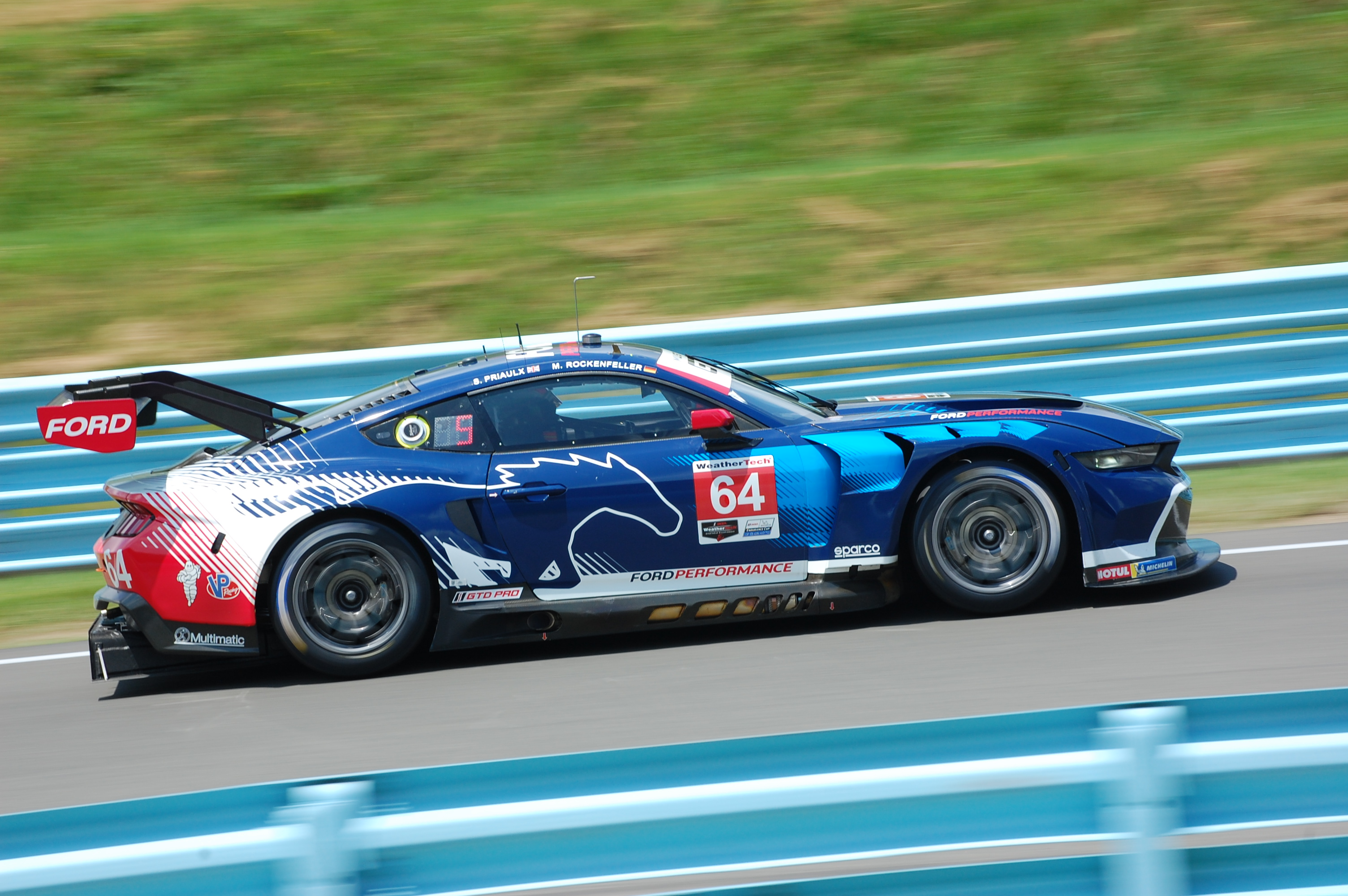
Priaulx at Watkins Glen in 2025

These increasing commitments saw Priaulx return to GTD Pro in 2025, teaming up with Mike Rockenfeller aboard a new-look lineup in Multimatic's #64 Ford Mustang GT3 entry. It marked a return for Priaulx to a factory role which his father had held with Ford from 2016 to 2019. Priaulx stated that a return to Multimatic was "exactly what [he] dreamed about," and that several of the staff had worked with him while racing Mustangs in GT4 several years prior. The duo kicked off the season with a pole position at Daytona, which led to a podium finish in the race itself. In May, Priaulx and Rockenfeller claimed the No. 64's first ever IMSA class victory, winning at Detroit.

== Racing record ==
=== Career summary ===
Season	Series	Team	Races	Wins	Poles	F/Laps	Podiums	Points	Position
2015	Ginetta Junior Winter Series	JHR Developments	4	0	0	0	0	?	?
2016	Ginetta Junior Championship	JHR Developments	25	2	2	0	6	380	7th
2016	Ginetta Junior Winter Series	JHR Developments	4	2	1	1	4	132	**1st**
2017	Ginetta Junior Championship	JHR Developments	17	6	8	5	8	627	**2nd**
2017	Ginetta Junior Championship	HHC Motorsport	9	1	1	1	5	627	**2nd**
2018	F4 British Championship	TRS Arden Junior Racing Team	30	2	1	3	8	275	7th
2019	British GT Championship - GT4	Multimatic Motorsports	9	2	2	1	4	132.5	**2nd**
2019	Michelin Pilot Challenge - GS	Multimatic Motorsports	1	1	0	0	1	35	54th
2020	Michelin Pilot Challenge - GS	Multimatic Motorsports	10	0	0	0	1	203	11th
2021	Porsche Carrera Cup North America - Pro	Kelly-Moss Road and Race	16	6	12	7	13	371	**1st**
2022	FIA World Endurance Championship - LMGTE Am	Dempsey-Proton Racing	6	2	1	0	2	83	6th
2022	24 Hours of Le Mans - LMGTE Am	Dempsey-Proton Racing	1	0	0	0	0	N/A	14th
2022	GT World Challenge Europe Endurance Cup	Inception Racing with Optimum Motorsport	1	0	0	0	0	0	NC
2022	GT World Challenge Europe Endurance Cup - Gold	Inception Racing with Optimum Motorsport	1	0	0	0	0	19	18th
2022	Intercontinental GT Challenge - Pro-Am	Inception Racing with Optimum Motorsport	1	0	0	0	1	18	?
2022	IMSA SportsCar Championship - GTD	Inception Racing with Optimum Motorsport	1	0	0	1	1	340	50th
2022	IMSA SportsCar Championship - LMP3	Sean Creech Motorsport	1	0	0	0	1	0	NC†
2022	IMSA Prototype Challenge	Sean Creech Motorsport	1	0	0	1	0	250	29th
2023	IMSA SportsCar Championship - GTD	AO Racing Team	10	0	0	0	0	2245	14th
2024	IMSA SportsCar Championship - GTD Pro	AO Racing	6	2	1	1	4	1955	12th
2024	Nürburgring Langstrecken-Serie - VT2-FWD	Walkenhorst Motorsport	1	0	0	0	0	0	NC
2024	Nürburgring Langstrecken-Serie - VT2-R+4WD	Walkenhorst Motorsport	1	0	0	0	0	0	NC
2025	IMSA SportsCar Championship - GTD Pro	Ford Multimatic Motorsports	10	2	2	0	4	3077	**3rd**
2026	IMSA SportsCar Championship - GTD Pro	Ford Racing	3	0	0	0	0	737	19th
2026	European Le Mans Series - LMP2	Proton Competition	6	0	0	0	0	21	15th
2026	FIA World Endurance Championship - LMGT3	Proton Competition	8	0	1	0	0	13	23rd

^{†} Points only counted towards the Michelin Endurance Cup, and not the overall LMP3 Championship

=== Complete Ginetta Junior Championship results ===
(key) (Races in bold indicate pole position) (Races in italics indicate fastest lap)

Year	Team	1	2	3	4	5	6	7	8	9	10	11	12	13	14	15	16	17	18	19	20	21	22	23	24	25	26	Pos	Points
2016	JHR Developments	BHI; 1; 18	BHI; 2; 13	DON; 1; 7	DON; 2; 8	DON; 3; 8	THR; 1; 5	THR; 2; 3	OUL; 1; 15	OUL; 2; 17	CRO; 1; 2	CRO; 2; 3	CRO; 3; 11	SNE; 1; 12	SNE; 2; 11	**KNO**; **1**; 3	KNO; 2; 13	KNO; 3; 17	ROC; 1; 4	ROC; 2; 16	ROC; 3; 7	**SIL**; **1**; 2	SIL; 2; 1	SIL; 3; 6	BHGP; 1; 9	BHGP; 2; 4		7th	380
2017	JHR Developments	**BHI**; **1**; 4	**BHI**; **2**; 1	DON; 1; 6	DON; 2; 7	DON; 3 Ret	**THR**; **1**; 5	**THR**; **2**; 1	**OUL**; **1**; 1	OUL; 2; 1	**CRO**; **1**; 1	**CRO**; **2**; 1	**CRO**; **3**; 3	SNE; 1; 8	SNE; 2; 3	SNE; 3; 7	KNO; 1; 7	KNO; 2; 6										2nd	627
2017	HHC Motorsport																		ROC; 1; 2	ROC; 2; 3	ROC; 3; 3	SIL; 1; 4	SIL; 2; 2	SIL; 3; 5	**BHGP**; **1**; 1	BHGP; 2; 6	BHGP; 3; 4	2nd	627

=== Complete F4 British Championship results ===
(key) (Races in bold indicate pole position) (Races in italics indicate fastest lap)

Year	Team	1	2	3	4	5	6	7	8	9	10	11	12	13	14	15	16	17	18	19	20	21	22	23	24	25	26	27	28	29	30	Pos	Points
2018	TRS Arden Junior Racing Team	BRI; 1; 4	BRI; 2; 1	BRI; 3; 4	DON; 1; 2	DON; 2; 6	DON; 3; 5	THR; 1; 10	THR; 2; 7	THR; 3; 6	OUL; 1; 10	OUL; 2; 9	OUL; 3 Ret	CRO; 1; 10	CRO; 2; 7	CRO; 3; 6	SNE; 1; 2	SNE; 2; 2	SNE; 3; 7	ROC; 1; 6	ROC; 2 Ret	ROC; 3; 2	KNO; 1; 5	KNO; 2; 2	KNO; 3; 11	SIL; 1; 9	SIL; 2; 8	SIL; 3; 8	**BHGP**; **1**; 1	BHGP; 2; 6	BHGP; 3; 2	7th	275

=== Complete British GT Championship results ===
(key) (Races in bold indicate pole position) (Races in italics indicate fastest lap)

Year	Team	Car	Class	1	2	3	4	5	6	7	8	9	DC	Points
2019	Multimatic Motorsports	Ford Mustang GT4	GT4	**OUL**; **1**; 29	**OUL**; **2**; 10	**SNE**; **1**; 24	SNE; 2; 18	SIL; 1; 16	**DON**; **1**; 15	SPA; 1; 19	BRH; 1; 21	DON; 1; 13	2nd	132.5

=== Complete Porsche Carrera Cup North America results ===
(key) (Races in bold indicate pole position) (Races in italics indicate fastest lap)

Year	Team	1	2	3	4	5	6	7	8	9	10	11	12	13	14	15	16	Pos	Points
2021	Kelly-Moss Road and Race	**SEB**; **1**; 1	**SEB**; **2**; 2	**COA**; **1**; 3	**COA**; **2**; 2	GLE; 1; 8	**GLE**; **2**; 2	ROA; 1; 4	ROA; 2; 2	**IMS**; **1**; 1	**IMS**; **2**; 6	**IMS**; **3**; 1	VIR; 1; 2	**VIR**; **2**; 1	**ATL**; **1**; 1	**ATL**; **2**; 2	**ATL**; **3**; 1	1st	371

=== Complete FIA World Endurance Championship results ===
(key) (Races in bold indicate pole position; races in italics indicate fastest lap)

Year	Entrant	Class	Chassis	Engine	1	2	3	4	5	6	7	8	Rank	Points
2022	Dempsey-Proton Racing	LMGTE Am	Porsche 911 RSR-19	Porsche M97/80 4.2L Flat-6	SEB; 4	SPA; 1	**LMS**; 8	MNZ; 1	FUJ; Ret	BHR; 8			6th	83
2026	Proton Competition	LMGT3	Ford Mustang GT3 Evo	Ford Coyote 5.4 L V8	IMO; 10	SPA; 16	LMS; Ret	SÃO; 10	COA; 5	**FUJ**; 10	CAT; NC	MNZ; 12	23rd	13

=== Complete GT World Challenge Europe results ===
==== GT World Challenge Europe Endurance Cup ====
Year	Team	Car	Class	1	2	3	4	5	6	7	Pos.	Points
2022	Inception Racing with Optimum Motorsport	McLaren 720S GT3	Gold	IMO	LEC	SPA; 6H; 38	SPA; 12H; 38	SPA; 24H; 27	HOC	CAT	18th	19

=== Complete IMSA SportsCar Championship results ===
(key) (Races in bold indicate pole position)

Year	Team	Class	Make	Engine	1	2	3	4	5	6	7	8	9	10	11	12	Rank	Points	Ref
2022	Sean Creech Motorsport	LMP3	Ligier JS P320	Nissan VK56DE 5.6 L V8	DAY; 2†												NC†	0†	
2022	Inception Racing with Optimum Motorsport	GTD	McLaren 720S GT3	McLaren M840T 4.0L Turbo V8		SEB	LBH	LGA	MDO	DET	WGL	MOS	LIM	ELK	VIR	PET; 2	50th	340	
2023	AO Racing Team	GTD	Porsche 911 GT3 R (992)	Porsche 4.2 L Flat-6	DAY; 14	SEB; 16	LBH; DNS	LGA; 11	WGL; 14	MOS; 8	LIM; 7	ELK; 11	VIR; 6	IMS; 10	PET; 8		14th	2245	
2024	AO Racing	GTD Pro	Porsche 911 GT3 R (992)	Porsche 4.2 L Flat-6	**DAY**; 2	SEB; 9	LGA; 1	DET; 1	WGL; 6	MOS; 3	ELK	VIR	IMS	PET			12th	1955	
2025	Ford Multimatic Motorsports	GTD Pro	Ford Mustang GT3	Ford Coyote 5.4 L V8	**DAY**; 3	SEB; 5	LGA; 9	**DET**; 1	WGL; 6	MOS; 10	ELK; 2	VIR; 4	IMS; 1	PET; 4			3rd	3077	
2026	Ford Racing	GTD Pro	Ford Mustang GT3 Evo	Ford Coyote 5.4 L V8	DAY; 7	SEB; 8	LGA	DET	WGL	MOS	ELK	VIR	IMS	PET; 11			19th	737	

^{†} Points only counted towards the Michelin Endurance Cup, and not the overall LMP3 Championship.

=== Complete 24 Hours of Le Mans results ===
Year	Team	Co-Drivers	Car	Class	Laps	Pos.	Class Pos.
2022	(Germany) Dempsey-Proton Racing	(Germany) Christian Ried (United Kingdom) Harry Tincknell	Porsche 911 RSR-19	GTE; Am	336	47th	14th
2026	(Germany) Proton Competition	(United States) Eric Powell (United Kingdom) Ben Tuck	Ford Mustang GT3 Evo	LMGT3	244	DNF	DNF

=== Complete European Le Mans Series results ===
(key) (Races in bold indicate pole position; results in italics indicate fastest lap)

Year	Entrant	Class	Chassis	Engine	1	2	3	4	5	6	Rank	Points
2026	Proton Competition	LMP2	Oreca 07	Gibson GK428 4.2 L V8	CAT; Ret	LEC; 8	IMO; 8	SPA; 6	SIL; 8	ALG; 10	15th	21

Sporting positions
Preceded by Stuart Middleton	Ginetta Junior Winter Series; Champion; 2016	Succeeded by Adam Smalley
Preceded by Series founded	Porsche Carrera Cup North America; Champion; 2021	Succeeded by Parker Thompson
