= 2017 Ginetta Junior Championship =

Motor racing championship across England and Scotland

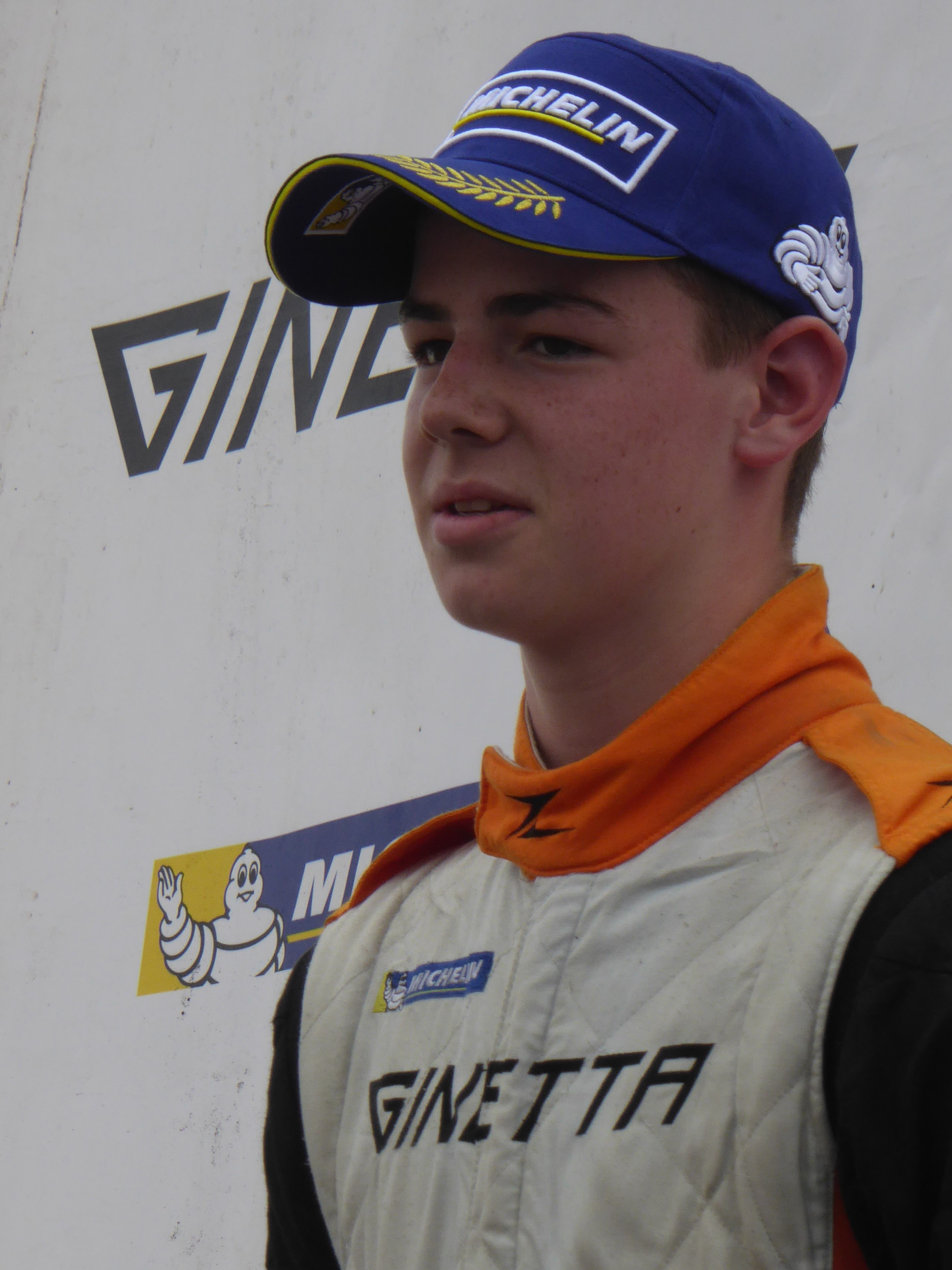
Tom Gamble, after finishing third in the second race at the Knockhill round. Gamble won the championship by 27 points ahead of his closest rival, Sebastian Priaulx.

The 2017 Simpson Race Products Ginetta Junior Championship was a multi-event, one-make motor racing championship held across England and Scotland. The championship featured a mix of professional motor racing teams and privately funded drivers, aged between 14 and 17, competing in Ginetta G40s that conformed to the technical regulations for the championship. It formed part of the extensive program of support categories built up around the British Touring Car Championship centrepiece. It was the eleventh Ginetta Junior Championship and commenced on 1 April 2017 at Brands Hatch – on the circuit's Indy configuration – and concluded on 1 October 2017 at the same venue, utilising the Grand Prix circuit, after 25 races held at ten meetings, all in support of the 2017 British Touring Car Championship season.

== Teams and drivers ==
| Team | No. | Drivers | Rounds |
|---|---|---|---|
| HHC Motorsport | 9 | (United Kingdom) Jordan Collard | All |
| HHC Motorsport | 11 | (United Kingdom) Sebastian Priaulx | 8–10 |
| HHC Motorsport | 20 | (United Kingdom) Tom Wood | All |
| HHC Motorsport | 27 | (United Kingdom) Scott McKenna | 1–2 |
| HHC Motorsport | 31 | (United Kingdom) Charlie Digby | All |
| HHC Motorsport | 54 | (United Kingdom) Adam Smalley | 8–10 |
| HHC Motorsport | 55 | (Netherlands) Ruben del Sarte | All |
| JHR Developments | 11 | (United Kingdom) Sebastian Priaulx | 1–7 |
| JHR Developments | 23 | (United Kingdom) Tom Gamble | 1–7 |
| JHR Developments | 29 | (United Kingdom) Harry Dyson | 1–7 |
| JHR Developments | 46 | (United Kingdom) Jenson Dineen | 1–5 |
| JHR Developments | 54 | (United Kingdom) Adam Smalley | 1–7 |
| JHR Developments | 72 | (United Kingdom) Matt Luff | 1–7 |
| Richardson Racing | 72 | (United Kingdom) Matt Luff | 8–10 |
| Richardson Racing | 12 | (United Kingdom) Luke Browning | All |
| Elite Motorsport | 17 | (United Kingdom) Louis Foster | 8–10 |
| Elite Motorsport | 19 | (United Kingdom) Harry King | All |
| Elite Motorsport | 23 | (United Kingdom) Tom Gamble | 8–10 |
| Elite Motorsport | 44 | (United Kingdom) Finley Green | 8–10 |
| Elite Motorsport | 67 | (United Kingdom) James Hedley | 9–10 |
| Elite Motorsport | 79 | (United Kingdom) Greg Johnson | All |
| Elite Motorsport | 81 | (Trinidad and Tobago) Isa Deen | 6–8 |
| Elite Motorsport | 99 | (United Kingdom) Emily Linscott | 8–10 |
| Douglas Motorsport | 21 | (United Kingdom) Tom Canning | All |
| Douglas Motorsport | 25 | (United Kingdom) Connor Grady | 1–8 |
| Douglas Motorsport | 33 | (United Kingdom) Daniel Harper | All |
| Douglas Motorsport | 87 | (United Kingdom) Kiern Jewiss | All |
| Fox Motorsport | 44 | (United Kingdom) Finley Green | 1–7 |
| Fox Motorsport | 57 | (United Kingdom) Keaton Samra | 1–5 |

== Race calendar ==
| Round | | Circuit | Date | Pole position | Fastest lap | Winning driver | Winning team |
|---|---|---|---|---|---|---|---|
| 1 | R1 | Brands Hatch (Indy Circuit, Kent) | 1 April | (United Kingdom) Sebastian Priaulx | (United Kingdom) Harry Dyson | (United Kingdom) Harry Dyson | JHR Developments |
| 1 | R2 | Brands Hatch (Indy Circuit, Kent) | 2 April | (United Kingdom) Sebastian Priaulx | (United Kingdom) Sebastian Priaulx | (United Kingdom) Sebastian Priaulx | JHR Developments |
| 2 | R3 | Donington Park (National Circuit, Leicestershire) | 15 April | (United Kingdom) Daniel Harper | (United Kingdom) Sebastian Priaulx | (United Kingdom) Tom Gamble | JHR Developments |
| 2 | R4 | Donington Park (National Circuit, Leicestershire) | 16 April | (United Kingdom) Daniel Harper | (United Kingdom) Daniel Harper | (United Kingdom) Daniel Harper | Douglas Motorsport |
| 2 | R5 | Donington Park (National Circuit, Leicestershire) | 16 April | | (United Kingdom) Kiern Jewiss | (United Kingdom) Tom Gamble | JHR Developments |
| 3 | R6 | Thruxton Circuit (Hampshire) | 7 May | (United Kingdom) Sebastian Priaulx | (United Kingdom) Daniel Harper | (United Kingdom) Tom Gamble | JHR Developments |
| 3 | R7 | Thruxton Circuit (Hampshire) | 7 May | (United Kingdom) Sebastian Priaulx | (United Kingdom) Daniel Harper | (United Kingdom) Sebastian Priaulx | JHR Developments |
| 4 | R8 | Oulton Park (Island Circuit, Cheshire) | 20 May | (United Kingdom) Sebastian Priaulx | (United Kingdom) Tom Wood | (United Kingdom) Sebastian Priaulx | JHR Developments |
| 4 | R9 | Oulton Park (Island Circuit, Cheshire) | 21 May | (United Kingdom) Daniel Harper | (United Kingdom) Sebastian Priaulx | (United Kingdom) Sebastian Priaulx | JHR Developments |
| 5 | R10 | Croft Circuit (North Yorkshire) | 10 June | (United Kingdom) Sebastian Priaulx | (United Kingdom) Sebastian Priaulx | (United Kingdom) Sebastian Priaulx | JHR Developments |
| 5 | R11 | Croft Circuit (North Yorkshire) | 10 June | (United Kingdom) Sebastian Priaulx | (United Kingdom) Tom Wood | (United Kingdom) Sebastian Priaulx | JHR Developments |
| 5 | R12 | Croft Circuit (North Yorkshire) | 11 June | | (United Kingdom) Tom Wood | (United Kingdom) Tom Gamble | JHR Developments |
| 6 | R13 | Snetterton Motor Racing Circuit (300 Circuit, Norfolk) | 29 July | (United Kingdom) Kiern Jewiss | (United Kingdom) Adam Smalley | (United Kingdom) Daniel Harper | Douglas Motorsport |
| 6 | R14 | Snetterton Motor Racing Circuit (300 Circuit, Norfolk) | 29 July | (United Kingdom) Kiern Jewiss | (United Kingdom) Tom Wood | (United Kingdom) Daniel Harper | Douglas Motorsport |
| 6 | R15 | Snetterton Motor Racing Circuit (300 Circuit, Norfolk) | 30 July | | (United Kingdom) Sebastian Priaulx | (United Kingdom) Tom Wood | HHC Motorsport |
| 7 | R16 | Knockhill Racing Circuit (Fife) | 13 August | (United Kingdom) Daniel Harper | (United Kingdom) Harry King | (United Kingdom) Harry King | Elite Motorsport |
| 7 | R17 | Knockhill Racing Circuit (Fife) | 13 August | (United Kingdom) Kiern Jewiss | (United Kingdom) Daniel Harper | (United Kingdom) Kiern Jewiss | Douglas Motorsport |
| 8 | R18 | Rockingham Motor Speedway (International Super Sports Car Circuit, Northamptonshire) | 26 August | (United Kingdom) Daniel Harper | (United Kingdom) Tom Wood | (United Kingdom) Daniel Harper | Douglas Motorsport |
| 8 | R19 | Rockingham Motor Speedway (International Super Sports Car Circuit, Northamptonshire) | 27 August | (United Kingdom) Daniel Harper | (United Kingdom) Tom Gamble | (United Kingdom) Tom Gamble | Elite Motorsport |
| 8 | R20 | Rockingham Motor Speedway (International Super Sports Car Circuit, Northamptonshire) | 27 August | | (United Kingdom) Daniel Harper | (United Kingdom) Daniel Harper | Douglas Motorsport |
| 9 | R21 | Silverstone Circuit (National Circuit, Northamptonshire) | 16 September | (United Kingdom) Tom Wood | (United Kingdom) Harry King | (United Kingdom) Tom Gamble | Elite Motorsport |
| 9 | R22 | Silverstone Circuit (National Circuit, Northamptonshire) | 16 September | (United Kingdom) Luke Browning | (United Kingdom) Tom Gamble | (United Kingdom) Tom Gamble | Elite Motorsport |
| 9 | R23 | Silverstone Circuit (National Circuit, Northamptonshire) | 17 September | | (United Kingdom) Tom Gamble | (United Kingdom) Tom Gamble | Elite Motorsport |
| 10 | R24 | Brands Hatch (Grand Prix Circuit, Kent) | 30 September | (United Kingdom) Sebastian Priaulx | (United Kingdom) Sebastian Priaulx | (United Kingdom) Sebastian Priaulx | HHC Motorsport |
| 10 | R25 | Brands Hatch (Grand Prix Circuit, Kent) | 30 September | (United Kingdom) Harry King | (United Kingdom) Tom Gamble | (United Kingdom) Daniel Harper | Douglas Motorsport |
| 10 | R26 | Brands Hatch (Grand Prix Circuit, Kent) | 1 October | | (United Kingdom) Daniel Harper | (United Kingdom) Daniel Harper | Douglas Motorsport |

== Championship standings ==
Points system
| 1st | 2nd | 3rd | 4th | 5th | 6th | 7th | 8th | 9th | 10th | 11th | 12th | 13th | 14th | 15th | 16th | 17th | 18th | 19th | 20th | R1 PP | FL |
| 35 | 30 | 26 | 22 | 20 | 18 | 16 | 14 | 12 | 11 | 10 | 9 | 8 | 7 | 6 | 5 | 4 | 3 | 2 | 1 | 1 | 1 |

=== Drivers' championship ===
- A driver's best 24 scores counted towards the championship, with any other points being discarded.

| Pos | Driver | BHI | | DON | | | THR | | OUL | | CRO | | | SNE | | | KNO | | ROC | | | SIL | | | BHGP | | | Total | Drop | Pen. | Points |
|---|---|---|---|---|---|---|---|---|---|---|---|---|---|---|---|---|---|---|---|---|---|---|---|---|---|---|---|---|---|---|---|
| 1 | (United Kingdom) Tom Gamble | Ret | 2 | 1 | 3 | 1 | 1 | 2 | 5 | 11 | 4 | 3 | 1 | 5 | 7 | 3 | 4 | 3 | 3 | 1 | 2 | 1 | 1 | 1 | 7 | 2 | DNS | 660 | 0 | -6 | 654 |
| 2 | (United Kingdom) Sebastian Priaulx | 4 | 1 | 6 | 7 | Ret | 5 | 1 | 1 | 1 | 1 | 1 | 3 | 8 | 3 | 7 | 7 | 6 | 2 | 3 | 3 | 4 | 2 | 5 | 1 | 6 | 4 | 642 | 15 | 0 | 627 |
| 3 | (United Kingdom) Daniel Harper | 8 | 3 | 3 | 1 | 6 | 4 | 3 | 17 | 5 | 7 | 6 | 8 | 1 | 1 | 5 | 3 | 2 | 1 | 2 | 1 | 2 | 6 | 3 | 5 | 1 | 1 | 658 | 18 | -15 | 625 |
| 4 | (United Kingdom) Kiern Jewiss (R) | Ret | 11 | 2 | Ret | 2 | 12 | 4 | 3 | 3 | 2 | 2 | 2 | 2 | 5 | 2 | 2 | 1 | NC | 9 | 7 | 9 | 5 | 4 | 3 | 5 | 5 | 542 | 0 | 0 | 542 |
| 5 | (United Kingdom) Tom Wood | 3 | 8 | 5 | 2 | 3 | Ret | 6 | 2 | 2 | 3 | 5 | 4 | 3 | 9 | 1 | 6 | 5 | 4 | 4 | 9 | 11 | 4 | Ret | 6 | 4 | 3 | 529 | 0 | -15 | 514 |
| 6 | (United Kingdom) Harry King | 2 | 4 | 4 | 12 | 8 | 3 | 5 | 7 | Ret | 6 | 9 | 6 | 6 | 13 | 6 | 1 | 15 | 6 | 5 | 4 | 3 | 3 | 2 | 2 | 3 | 2 | 520 | 6 | -6 | 508 |
| 7 | (United Kingdom) Adam Smalley (R) | 6 | 7 | 7 | 8 | 15 | 6 | 17 | 13 | 6 | 8 | 7 | 5 | 4 | 2 | 4 | 5 | 10 | 5 | 7 | 11 | 5 | 12 | 6 | 4 | Ret | Ret | 389 | 0 | -12 | 377 |
| 8 | (United Kingdom) Jordan Collard | 14 | 13 | Ret | 11 | 14 | Ret | 7 | 6 | 8 | 5 | 8 | 9 | 14 | 8 | Ret | 9 | 4 | 9 | 6 | 5 | 6 | 7 | 8 | 8 | DSQ | 9 | 307 | 0 | -24 | 283 |
| 9 | (Netherlands) Ruben del Sarte (R) | 10 | 9 | 9 | Ret | 7 | 14 | 15 | 9 | 10 | 11 | 17 | 12 | 10 | 10 | 10 | 12 | 9 | 8 | 10 | 8 | 8 | 11 | 12 | 11 | 7 | 7 | 278 | 4 | 0 | 274 |
| 10 | (United Kingdom) Tom Canning (R) | 12 | 15 | 12 | Ret | 9 | 7 | 8 | 10 | 16 | 13 | Ret | 14 | 11 | 11 | 11 | 14 | 8 | 10 | 11 | 10 | 10 | 10 | 13 | 13 | 8 | 10 | 243 | 0 | 0 | 243 |
| 11 | (United Kingdom) Luke Browning (R) | 11 | 16 | 10 | Ret | 11 | 16 | 11 | 8 | 12 | 14 | 11 | 11 | 9 | 12 | 7 | 11 | 13 | 7 | 8 | 6 | Ret | Ret | 15 | 9 | Ret | Ret | 222 | 0 | -12 | 210 |
| 12 | (United Kingdom) Harry Dyson | 1 | 6 | 8 | 5 | Ret | 2 | Ret | 18 | 4 | 10 | 4 | 15 | 8 | 6 | 13 | 16 | Ret | | | | | | | | | | 227 | 0 | -18 | 209 |
| 13 | (United Kingdom) Connor Grady | 5 | 5 | Ret | Ret | 5 | 8 | 10 | 4 | 7 | 12 | 13 | 7 | Ret | 4 | 9 | 8 | 12 | Ret | Ret | Ret | | | | | | | 213 | 0 | -6 | 207 |
| 14 | (United Kingdom) Charlie Digby | 7 | 19 | 11 | Ret | 16 | 9 | 12 | 15 | 14 | 9 | 10 | 13 | 15 | 14 | Ret | 10 | 7 | 11 | Ret | 15 | 7 | 15 | 7 | Ret | DNS | 12 | 201 | 0 | -6 | 195 |
| 15 | (United Kingdom) Matt Luff (R) | 9 | 20 | 16 | 6 | 12 | 11 | 9 | Ret | 9 | 19 | 16 | 10 | 12 | Ret | 14 | 17 | 16 | 14 | 14 | 17 | 14 | 14 | 16 | 17 | 11 | Ret | 173 | 0 | 0 | 173 |
| 16 | (United Kingdom) Greg Johnson | 15 | 14 | 15 | Ret | 10 | 10 | 16 | 12 | 13 | 17 | 15 | Ret | 13 | 15 | Ret | 15 | 14 | 13 | 12 | 16 | 16 | 9 | 11 | 14 | Ret | Ret | 156 | 0 | 0 | 156 |
| 17 | (United Kingdom) Finley Green (R) | 16 | 10 | Ret | Ret | DNS | Ret | 14 | 16 | 18 | 18 | Ret | 18 | 16 | 17 | 12 | 18 | Ret | 15 | 13 | 12 | 13 | 8 | 14 | 15 | Ret | 11 | 126 | 0 | 0 | 126 |
| 18 | (United Kingdom) Jenson Dineen | 13 | 18 | Ret | 9 | 13 | 13 | 13 | 11 | 15 | 15 | 12 | 17 | | | | | | | | | | | | | | | 82 | 0 | -6 | 76 |
| 19 | (United Kingdom) Louis Foster (R) | | | | | | | | | | | | | | | | | | Ret | 15 | 13 | 15 | 13 | 9 | 12 | 9 | 8 | 75 | 0 | 0 | 75 |
| 20 | (United Kingdom) Keaton Samra (R) | 17 | 17 | 14 | 10 | Ret | 15 | 18 | 14 | 17 | 16 | 14 | 16 | | | | | | | | | | | | | | | 63 | 0 | 0 | 63 |
| 21 | (United Kingdom) Scott McKenna (R) | Ret | 12 | 13 | 4 | 4 | | | | | | | | | | | | | | | | | | | | | | 61 | 0 | 0 | 61 |
| 22 | (United Kingdom) James Hedley (R) | | | | | | | | | | | | | | | | | | | | | 17 | 16 | 10 | 10 | 10 | 6 | 60 | 0 | 0 | 60 |
| 23 | (Trinidad and Tobago) Isa Deen (R) | | | | | | | | | | | | | 17 | 16 | 15 | 13 | 11 | 12 | 16 | 14 | | | | | | | 54 | 0 | 0 | 54 |
| 24 | (United Kingdom) Emily Linscott (R) | | | | | | | | | | | | | | | | | | Ret | 17 | 18 | 12 | Ret | 17 | 16 | 12 | 13 | 42 | 0 | 0 | 42 |
| Pos | Driver | BHI | | DON | | | THR | | OUL | | CRO | | | SNE | | | KNO | | ROC | | | SIL | | | BHGP | | | Total | Drop | Pen. | Points |
