= Dan Harper =

Northern Irish racing driver (born 2000)

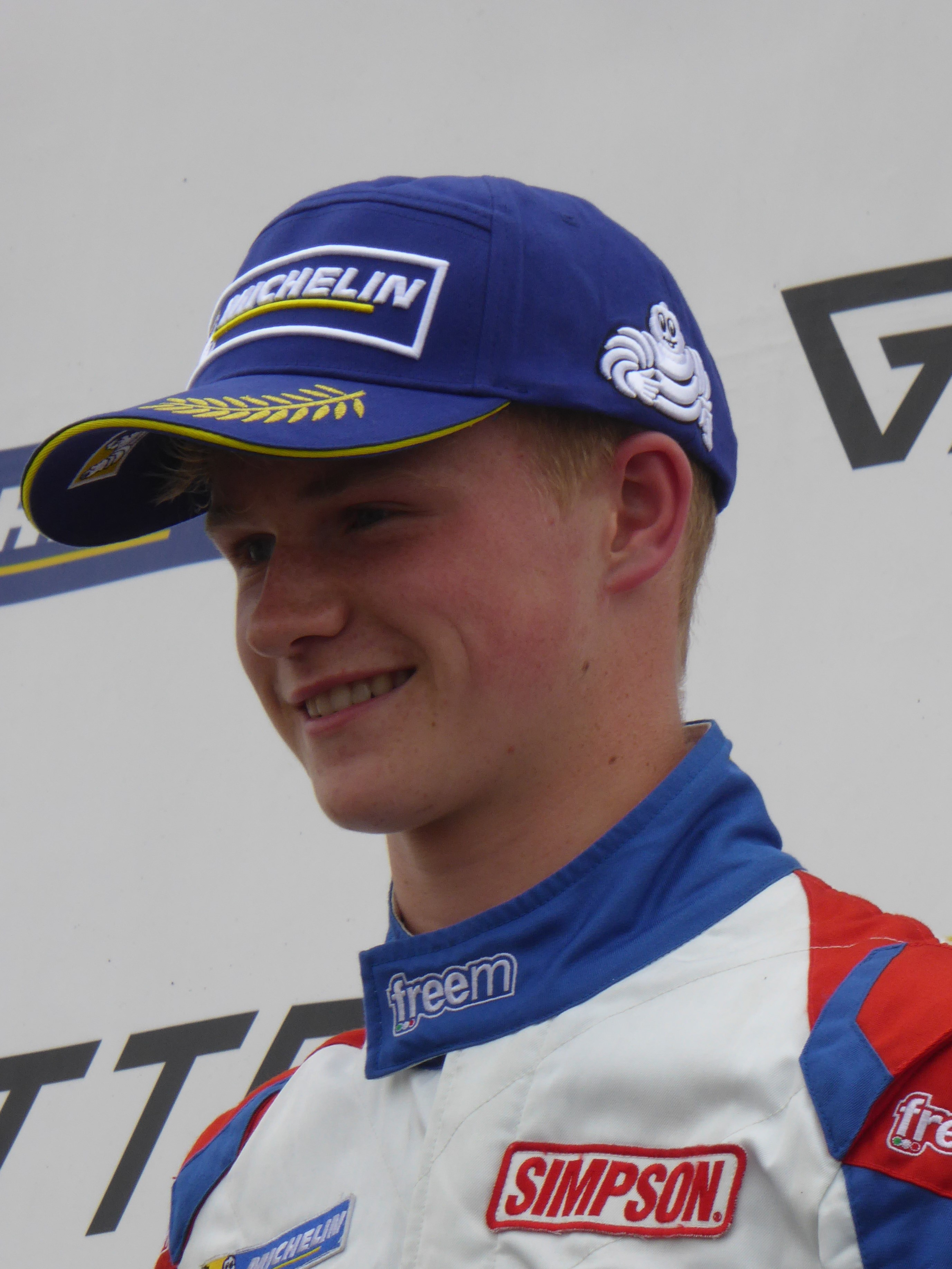
- Harper in 2017
- Nationality: (United Kingdom) British
- Born: Daniel Harper; 8 December 2000 (age 25) Hillsborough, Northern Ireland

British GT Championship career
- Debut season: 2023
- Current team: Paradine Competition
- Categorisation: FIA Silver (until 2019); FIA Gold (2020–2022); FIA Platinum (2023–)
- Car number: 91
- Former teams: Century Motorsport
- Starts: 15
- Wins: 3
- Podiums: 6
- Poles: 1
- Fastest laps: 2
- Best finish: 1st in 2023

Previous series
- 2016–17: Ginetta Junior Championship

Championship titles
- 2025 2024 2023 2023 2019 2016: Michelin Endurance Cup; GT World Challenge Europe Sprint Cup - Bronze Cup; British GT Championship; British GT Championship - Pro-Am; Porsche Carrera Cup Great Britain; Ginetta Junior Championship - Rookie

Awards
- 2023 2020–22 2018–19 2016: BMW Factory Driver; BMW Junior Team; Porsche GB Junior; Ginetta Junior Scholar

Daniel Harper (born 8 December 2000) is a British racing driver from Northern Ireland. He is currently competing as a BMW Motorsport works driver and was the 2023 British GT champion.

== Career ==
Harper started his racing career aged six, was a multiple champion in both quad bike and karting competition in his early years, before switching to junior rallying and winning three events in the Ireland Junior 1000 Rally Challenge in 2015.

Harper made the transition to circuit racing the following year after winning the Ginetta Junior Scholarship and with it a fully-funded season in the Ginetta Junior Championship for 2016.

In his maiden campaign with Douglas Motorsport, Harper took two outright race victories and won the Rookie Cup title. He returned for a second campaign and won seven races on his way to third in the final standings.

Harper then won his second manufacturer scholarship in three years, being named the 2018/19 Porsche GB Junior driver for the Porsche Carrera Cup Great Britain. In his first year, he won two races and posted more pole positions and fastest laps than any other driver.

In 2019, Harper won the drivers’ title and finished the season with the most wins (eight), pole positions (six) and fastest laps (11).

For 2020/21, Harper was signed by BMW Motorsport to compete as part of their BMW Junior Team. In each season, he contested the Nürburgring Endurance Series and ADAC TOTAL 24 Hours of Nürburgring alongside team-mates Max Hesse and Neil Verhagen.

Starting the 2020 NES season in a BMW M240i, the BMW Junior Team took a maiden class win in their third race. A step up to a BMW M4 GT4 soon after yielded a class podium in their first race and a class victory in their first attempt at the ADAC Total 24 Hours of Nürburgring.

For 2021, they moved up to the premier class in a BMW M6 GT3 with the BMW Team RMG. They achieved two overall race wins and four podium finishes to finish as the overall Nürburgring Endurance Series vice-champions.

In 2022, Harper and the BMW Junior Team won a qualifier race ahead of the ADAC TOTAL 24 Hours of Nürburgring and took a podium finish during a two round stint in the Nürburgring Endurance Series with BMW Team RMG. They also contested a debut season in the GT World Challenge Europe Endurance Cup with ROWE Racing, taking a best result of fourth in the 1000 km of Paul Ricard.

In 2023, Harper competed as a BMW works driver, entering the opening three rounds of the Nürburgring Endurance Series and the ADAC TOTAL 24 Hours of Nürburgring with BMW Team RMG, another full season in the GT World Challenge Europe Endurance Cup with ROWE Racing, and a debut campaign in the British GT Championship with Century Motorsport. He was crowned the 2023 British GT champion alongside team-mate Darren Leung, after two race wins and four podium finishes.

Continuing as a BMW works driver in 2024, Harper contested a dual programme in the GT World Challenge Europe; entering the Endurance Cup with ROWE Racing and the Sprint Cup with Century Motorsport. Harper was crowned the 2024 GT World Challenge Europe Sprint Cup Bronze drivers' champion alongside team-mate Darren Leung, after two race wins and six podium finishes.

Harper secured a podium finish in the ADAC TOTAL 24 Hours of Nürburgring alongside Max Hesse and Charles Weerts with BMW Team RMG, as well as contesting a partial campaign in the British GT Championship alongside Michael Johnston at Century Motorsport.

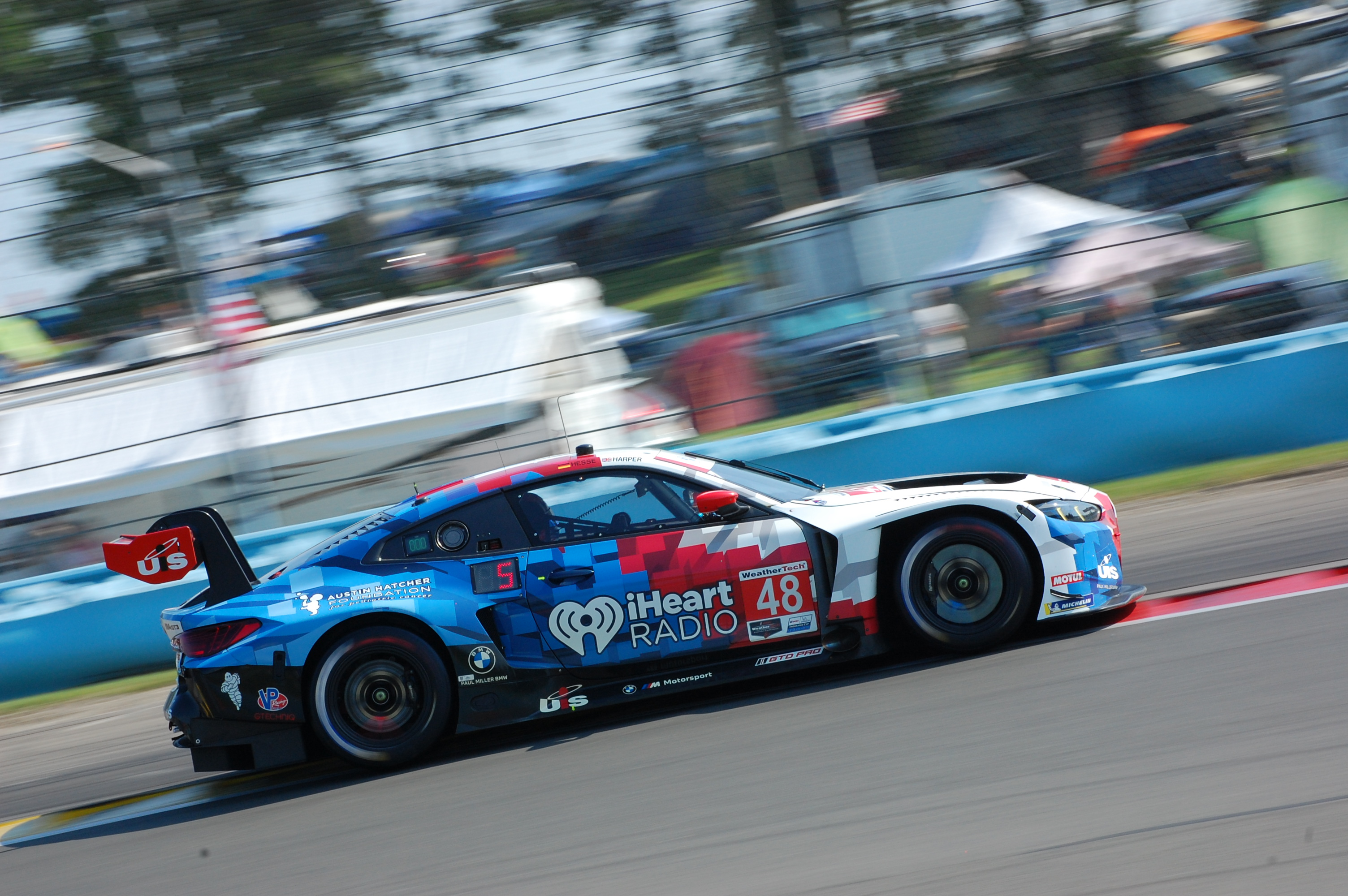
Harper at Watkins Glen in 2025

2025 marked Harper's sixth season with BMW. He took his inaugural 24-hour race victory in the 2025 Dubai 24 Hour alongside Max Hesse, Darren Leung, Ben Tuck and Al Faisal Al Zubair at Al Manar Racing by Team WRT.

Harper contested a first campaign in the IMSA SportsCar Championship alongside Hesse at Paul Miller Racing. They took GTD PRO class victories at Indianapolis and Petit Le Mans en-route to being crowned the 2025 Michelin Endurance Cup champions.

Harper was also a race-winner on a one-off British GT return at Silverstone alongside Leung, with whom he also contested selected rounds of the GT World Challenge Europe. He teamed with ROWE Racing for his fourth attempt at the 24 Hours of Spa and joined the Intercontinental GT Challenge grid at Suzuka.

In 2026, Harper contested his debut season in the FIA World Endurance Championship with Team WRT alongside Anthony McIntosh and Parker Thompson. They celebrated victory on his debut at Imola, before adding further podium finishes at Interlagos and Barcelona to secure third position in the FIA Endurance Trophy for LMGT3 Teams.

Harper returned for two outings in the IMSA SportsCar Championship with Paul Miller Racing, taking a class victory in the Rolex 24 At Daytona and a podium finish in the Petit Le Mans to help the team on their way to the GTD PRO title with Neil Verhagen and Connor De Phillippi. He also contested a partial campaign in the GT World Challenge Europe, secured his second career podium finish in the ADAC Ravenol 24 Hours of Nürburgring, race wins in the Nürburgring Langstrecken-Serie and Asian Le Mans Series, and a podium in a one-off return to the British GT Championship.

Harper is a full member of the British Racing Drivers' Club. He was previously part of the BRDC SuperStars programme and Motorsport UK Academy's Team UK programme.

== Racing record ==
=== Career summary ===
Season	Series	Team	Races	Wins	Poles	F/Laps	Podiums	Points	Position
2016	Ginetta Junior Championship	Douglas Motorsport	25	2	0	3	7	390	5th
2017	Ginetta Junior Championship	Douglas Motorsport	26	7	6	6	15	625	**3rd**
2018	Porsche Carrera Cup Great Britain	JTR	16	2	3	7	6	84	5th
2019	Porsche Carrera Cup Great Britain	JTR	16	8	6	11	13	159	**1st**
2019	Porsche Supercup	JTR	1	0	0	0	0	0	NC†
2020	24 Hours of Nürburgring - SP8T	Walkenhorst Motorsport	1	1	1	0	1	N/A	**1st**
2020	Nürburgring Endurance Series - SP8T	FK Performance Motorsport	3	0	0	0	1	11.25	4th
2021	Nürburgring Endurance Series - SP9 Pro	BMW Junior Team	7	2	0	0	4	39.22	**2nd**
2021	24 Hours of Nürburgring - SP9	BMW Junior Team Shell	1	0	0	0	0	N/A	DNF
2022	GT World Challenge Europe Endurance Cup	BMW Junior Team with ROWE Racing	5	0	0	0	0	36	11th
2022	Nürburgring Endurance Series - SP9 Pro	BMW Junior Team	2	0	0	0	1	0	NC†
2022	24 Hours of Nürburgring - SP9	BMW Junior Team Shell	1	0	0	0	0	N/A	DNF
2023	GT World Challenge Europe Endurance Cup	ROWE Racing	5	0	0	0	1	33	10th
2023	GT Winter Series	Schubert Motorsport	2	1	1	1	1	33	10th
2023	Nürburgring Endurance Series - SP9 Pro	BMW Junior Team	3	1	0	0	2	0	NC†
2023	24 Hours of Nürburgring - SP9	BMW Junior Team	1	0	0	0	0	N/A	DNF
2023	British GT Championship - GT3	Century Motorsport	9	2	0	2	4	176	**1st**
2023	GT Cup Championship - Group GT3	Century Motorsport	2	1	1	1	2	0	NC†
2023-24	Asian Le Mans Series - GT	Project 1	5	0	0	0	0	11	21st
2024	GT World Challenge Europe Endurance Cup	ROWE Racing	5	1	0	1	1	36	8th
2024	GT World Challenge Europe Sprint Cup	Century Motorsport	8	0	0	0	0	0	NC
2024	GT World Challenge Europe Sprint Cup - Bronze Cup	Century Motorsport	8	2	1	1	6	74.5	**1st**
2024	British GT Championship - GT3	Century Motorsport	4	0	0	0	0	14	16th
2024	24 Hours of Nürburgring - SP9	BMW M Team RMG	1	0	0	0	1	N/A	**3rd**
2024	Intercontinental GT Challenge	BMW M Team RMG	1	0	0	0	1	36	5th
2024	Intercontinental GT Challenge	ROWE Racing	1	0	0	0	0	36	5th
2024	Intercontinental GT Challenge	Team WRT	1	0	0	0	0	36	5th
2024	GT World Challenge America - Pro	Team WRT	1	0	0	0	0	0	NC†
2025	IMSA SportsCar Championship - GTD Pro	Paul Miller Racing	10	2	2	1	4	2984	4th
2025	Middle East Trophy - GT3	Al Manar Racing by Team WRT	1	1	0	0	1	?	?
2025	British GT Championship - GT3	Paradine Competition	1	1	0	0	1	0	NC†
2025	GT World Challenge Europe Sprint Cup	Paradine Competition	2	0	0	0	0	0	NC
2025	GT World Challenge Europe Sprint Cup - Bronze Cup	Paradine Competition	2	0	0	1	1	13	15th
2025	GT World Challenge Europe Endurance Cup	Paradine Competition	2	0	0	0	0	13	15th
2025	GT World Challenge Europe Endurance Cup	ROWE Racing	1	0	0	0	0	13	15th
2025-26	Asian Le Mans Series - GT	Team WRT	6	2	0	0	3	68	5th
2025-26	24H Series Middle East - GT3	Team WRT	1	0	0	0	1	0	NC†
2026	IMSA SportsCar Championship - GTD Pro	Paul Miller Racing	2	1	1	0	2	701	21st
2026	Nürburgring Langstrecken-Serie - SP9	FK Performance Motorsport	1	0	0	0	0	*	*
2026	Nürburgring Langstrecken-Serie - SP9	Rowe Racing	1	1	0	0	1	*	*
2026	24 Hours of Nürburgring - SP9	Rowe Racing	1	0	0	0	1	N/A	**3rd**
2026	FIA World Endurance Championship - LMGT3	Team WRT	8	1	0	0	3	78	5th
2026	GT World Challenge Europe Endurance Cup	Team WRT	4	0	0	0	0	13	19th
2026	British GT Championship - GT3	Paradine Competition	1	0	1	0	1	0	NC†
2026	Intercontinental GT Challenge	Rowe Racing	1	0	0	0	1	32	12th
2026	Intercontinental GT Challenge	Team WRT	2	0	0	0	0	32	12th

=== Complete Porsche Carrera Cup Great Britain results ===
Year	Team	1	2	3	4	5	6	7	8	9	10	11	12	13	14	15	16	Pos.	Points
2018	JTR	BRH; 1; 13	BRH; 2; 7	DON; 1; 3	DON; 2; 7	MNZ; 1 RET	MNZ; 2; 8	OUL; 1; 4	OUL; 2; 1	SNE; 1; 2	SNE; 2; 4	KNO; 1; 1	KNO; 2; 2	SIL; 1; 5	SIL; 2; 2	BGP; 1; 9	BGP; 2; 4	5th	84
2019	JTR	BRH; 1; 1	BRH; 2; 3	DON; 1; 1	DON; 2; 3	CRO; 1; 1	CRO; 2 (6)	OUL; 1; 1	OUL; 2; 4	THR; 1; 1	THR; 2; 1	SIL; 1; 1	SIL; 2; 4	SIL; 1; 7	SIL; 2; 4	BGP; 1; 4	**BGP**; **2**; 1	1st	159

=== Complete GT World Challenge Europe results ===
==== GT World Challenge Europe Endurance Cup ====
Year	Team	Car	Class	1	2	3	4	5	6	7	Pos.	Points
2022	ROWE Racing	BMW M4 GT3	Pro	IMO; 15	LEC; 4	SPA; 6H; 11	SPA; 12H; 2	SPA; 24H; 5	HOC; 9	CAT; 13	11th	36
2023	ROWE Racing	BMW M4 GT3	Pro	MNZ; 2	LEC; 6	SPA; 6H; 4	SPA; 12H; 53	SPA; 24H; Ret	NÜR; 11	CAT; 12	10th	33
2024	ROWE Racing	BMW M4 GT3	Pro	LEC; 1	SPA; 6H; 7	SPA; 12H; 17	SPA; 24H; 6	NÜR; 11	MNZ; 27	JED; Ret	8th	36
2025	Paradine Competition	BMW M4 GT3 Evo	Bronze	LEC; 27	MNZ				NÜR; Ret	CAT	18th	24
2025	ROWE Racing	BMW M4 GT3 Evo	Pro			SPA; 6H; 9	SPA; 12H; 1	SPA; 24H; 29			15th	13
2026	Team WRT	BMW M4 GT3 Evo	Pro	LEC; 12	MNZ; Ret	SPA; 6H; 9	SPA; 12H; 8	SPA; 24H; 6	NÜR; 9	ALG	19th	13

==== GT World Challenge Europe Sprint Cup ====
Year	Team	Car	Class	1	2	3	4	5	6	7	8	9	10	Pos.	Points
2024	Century Motorsport	BMW M4 GT3	Bronze	BRH; 1	BRH; 2	MIS; 1; 17	MIS; 2; 20	HOC; 1; 15	HOC; 2; 11	**MAG**; **1**; 21	MAG; 2; 26	CAT; 1; 21	CAT; 2; 22	1st	74.5
2025	Paradine Competition	BMW M4 GT3 Evo	Bronze	BRH; 1	BRH; 2	ZAN; 1	ZAN; 2	MIS; 1; 20	MIS; 2; 37	MAG; 1	MAG; 2	VAL; 1	VAL; 2	15th	13

=== Complete British GT Championship results ===
Year	Team	Car	Class	1	2	3	4	5	6	7	8	9	DC	Points
2023	Century Motorsport	BMW M4 GT3	GT3	OUL; 1; 6	OUL; 2; 6	SIL; 1; 1	DON; 1; 5	SNE; 1; 2	SNE; 2; 5	ALG; 1; 5	BRH; 1; 1	DON; 1; 2	1st	176
2024	Century Motorsport	BMW M4 GT3	GT3	OUL; 1; 9	OUL; 2; 14	SIL; 1; 17	DON; 1; 6	SPA; 1	SNE; 1	SNE; 2	DON; 1	BRH; 1	16th	14
2025	Paradine Competition	BMW M4 GT3 Evo	GT3	DON; 1	SIL; 1; 1	OUL; 1	OUL; 2	SPA; 1	SNE; 1	SNE; 2	BRH; 1	DON; 1	NC†	0†
2026	Paradine Competition	BMW M4 GT3 Evo	GT3	**SIL**; **1**; 3	OUL; 1	OUL; 2	SPA; 1	SNE; 1	SNE; 2	DON; 1	BRH; 1		NC†	0†

=== Complete Asian Le Mans Series results ===
Year	Team	Car	Class	1	2	3	4	5	6	Pos.	Points
2023–24	Team Project 1	BMW M4 GT3	GT	SEP; 1; 18	SEP; 2; 10	DUB; 1; 7	ABU; 1; 8	ABU; 2; 15		21st	11
2025–26	Team WRT	BMW M4 GT3 Evo	GT	SEP; 1; 12	SEP; 2; 2	DUB; 1 Ret	DUB; 2; 1	ABU; 1; 1	ABU; 2; 10	5th	68

=== Complete IMSA SportsCar Championship results ===
(key) (Races in bold indicate pole position; results in italics indicate fastest lap)

Year	Entrant	Class	Make	Engine	1	2	3	4	5	6	7	8	9	10	Rank	Points
2025	Paul Miller Racing	GTD Pro	BMW M4 GT3 Evo	BMW P58 3.0 L Twin Turbo I6	DAY; 12	SEB; 2	LGA; 5	DET; 7	WGL; 1	MOS; 9	ELK; 7	VIR; 10	**IMS**; 3	**PET**; 1	4th	2984
2026	Paul Miller Racing	GTD Pro	BMW M4 GT3 Evo	BMW P58 3.0 L Twin Turbo I6	DAY; 1	SEB	LGA	DET	WGL	MOS	ELK	VIR	IMS	**PET**; 3	21st	701

=== Complete FIA World Endurance Championship results ===
(key) (Races in bold indicate pole position; races in italics indicate fastest lap)

Year	Entrant	Class	Chassis	Engine	1	2	3	4	5	6	7	8	Rank	Points
2026	Team WRT	LMGT3	BMW M4 GT3 Evo	BMW P58 3.0 L I6 t	IMO; 1	SPA; 11	LMS; Ret	SÃO; 2	COA; 11	FUJ; 6	CAT; 3	MNZ; 4	5th	78

=== Complete 24 Hours of Le Mans results ===
Year	Team	Co-Drivers	Car	Class	Laps	Pos.	Class Pos.
2026	(Belgium) Team WRT	(United States) Anthony McIntosh (Canada) Parker Thompson	BMW M4 GT3 Evo	LMGT3	291	DNF	DNF

== Awards ==
Year	Nominated work	Category	Result
2019	Belfast Telegraph Sports Awards	Young Player Of The Year	Won
2019	Association of Northern Ireland Car Clubs Awards	ANICC Northern Ireland Motorsport Award	Won
2019	British Racing Drivers' Club Awards	The Henry Surtees Award	Won
2019	Autosport Awards	National Racing Driver of the Year	Nominated
2023	Motorsport News Awards	National Racing Driver of the Year	Nominated
2023	Autosport Awards	National Racing Driver of the Year	Nominated
2023	British GT Championship	Allan Simonsen Award (Driver of the Year)	Won
2026	Belfast Telegraph Sports Awards	Breakthrough Award	Nominated

Sporting positions
Preceded by Tio Ellinas	Porsche Carrera Cup GB; Champion; 2019	Succeeded by Harry King
Preceded by Ian Loggie	British GT Championship; Champion; 2023; With: Darren Leung	Succeeded by Rob Collard; Ricky Collard
Preceded by Ian Loggie	British GT Championship; Pro-Am Champion; 2023; With: Darren Leung	Succeeded by Rob Collard; Ricky Collard
Preceded by Alex Malykhin	GT World Challenge Europe Sprint Cup; Bronze Cup Champion; 2024; With: Darren Leung	Succeeded by Dennis Marschall; Dustin Blattner
Preceded by Bryan Sellers; Madison Snow; Neil Verhagen	Michelin Endurance Cup; GTD Pro Champion; 2025; With: Max Hesse	Succeeded by Connor De Phillippi; Neil Verhagen
