= 2016 Ginetta Junior Championship =

The 2016 Simpson Race Products Ginetta Junior Championship was a multi-event, one make motor racing championship held across England and Scotland. The championship featured a mix of professional motor racing teams and privately funded drivers, aged between 14 and 17, competing in Ginetta G40s that conformed to the technical regulations for the championship. It formed part of the extensive program of support categories built up around the British Touring Car Championship centrepiece. It was the tenth Ginetta Junior Championship, and commenced on 2 April 2016 at Brands Hatch – on the circuit's Indy configuration – and concluded on 2 October 2016 at the same venue, utilising the Grand Prix circuit, after twenty five races held at ten meetings, all in support of the 2016 British Touring Car Championship season.

== Teams and drivers ==
Team	No.	Drivers	Rounds
Elite Motorsport	10	(United Kingdom) Tom Wood	All
Elite Motorsport	19	(United Kingdom) Harry King	All
JHR Developments	11	(United Kingdom) Sebastian Priaulx	All
JHR Developments	26	(United Kingdom) Cameron Roberts	1–5, 7
JHR Developments	29	(United Kingdom) Harry Dyson	9–10
JHR Developments	30	(United States) Dhyllan Skiba	1–2, 4–6
JHR Developments	46	(United Kingdom) Jenson Dineen	8–10
JHR Developments	50	(United Kingdom) Geri Nicosia	All
JHR Developments	64	(United Kingdom) Olli Caldwell	5–7, 9–10
JHR Developments	77	(United Kingdom) Sebastian Perez	All
JHR Developments	83	(United Kingdom) Kyle Hornby	1–6, 8–9
Tollbar Racing	12	(United Kingdom) Alex Day	6
Team Pyro	20	(United Kingdom) Zak Fulk	1
HHC Motorsport	21	(United Kingdom) Lewis Brown	All
HHC Motorsport	23	(United Kingdom) Tom Gamble	1–6
HHC Motorsport	28	(United Kingdom) Charlie Fagg	All
HHC Motorsport	31	(United Kingdom) Charlie Digby	6–10
HHC Motorsport	71	(United Kingdom) Will Tregurtha	1–9
Optimum Motorsport	22	(United Kingdom) Connor O'Brien	8
Total Control Racing	25	(United Kingdom) Connor Grady	All
Total Control Racing	27	(United Kingdom) Dave Wooder	All
Total Control Racing	44	(United Kingdom) Max Bird	1–6, 8
Total Control Racing	68	(United Kingdom) Jordan Collard	All
Douglas Motorsport	33	(United Kingdom) Daniel Harper	All
Douglas Motorsport	74	(Brazil) Enzo Fittipaldi	1–7
Douglas Motorsport	75	(United Kingdom) Stuart Middleton	All
Mectech Motorsport	58	(United Kingdom) Anthony Ayres	1–4, 6, 9–10
Rob Boston Racing	79	(United Kingdom) Greg Johnson	1–3, 5–6, 8–10

== Driver changes ==
Leaving Ginetta Juniors

- 2015 Ginetta Junior champion Jamie Caroline advanced to MSA Formula with Jamun racing.
- Senna Proctor moved to Renault Clio Cup U.K after two seasons in Ginetta Juniors.
- Dan Zelos also moved to 2016 Renault UK Clio Cup after two years of Ginetta Juniors.
- Billy Monger joined 2015 champion Jamie Caroline in MSA Formula.
- 2015 rookie Patrik Matthiesen was promoted to MSA Formula 4.
- Matt Chapman moved to the Ginetta GT5 challenge, remaining with Total Control Racing.
- Sophia Flörsch made headlines withdrawing after 5 rounds and a double win at Thruxton in 2015. She spent the second half of 2015 preparing for the 2016 ADAC Formula 4 Championship with Motopark.
- Devlin DeFrancesco, having picked up the series during Sophia Flörsch's last round, moved onto MSA F4 with Carlin.
- Frank Bird also converted to Britain's MSA F4 with Fortec Motorsports for 2016.

== Race calendar ==
Round		Circuit	Date	Pole position	Fastest lap	Winning driver	Winning team
1	R1	Brands Hatch (Indy Circuit, Kent)	2 April	(United Kingdom) Stuart Middleton	(United Kingdom) Stuart Middleton	(United Kingdom) Will Tregurtha	HHC Motorsport
1	R2	Brands Hatch (Indy Circuit, Kent)	3 April		(United Kingdom) Lewis Brown	(United Kingdom) Stuart Middleton	Douglas Motorsport
2	R3	Donington Park (National Circuit, Leicestershire)	16 April	(United Kingdom) Lewis Brown	(United Kingdom) Stuart Middleton	(United Kingdom) Lewis Brown	HHC Motorsport
2	R4	Donington Park (National Circuit, Leicestershire)	16 April		(United Kingdom) Lewis Brown	(United Kingdom) Stuart Middleton	Douglas Motorsport
2	R5	Donington Park (National Circuit, Leicestershire)	17 April		(United Kingdom) Lewis Brown	(United Kingdom) Daniel Harper	Douglas Motorsport
3	R6	Thruxton Circuit (Hampshire)	8 May	(United Kingdom) Sebastian Perez	(United Kingdom) Harry King	(United Kingdom) Stuart Middleton	Douglas Motorsport
3	R7	Thruxton Circuit (Hampshire)	8 May		(United Kingdom) Stuart Middleton	(United Kingdom) Dave Wooder	Total Control Racing
4	R8	Oulton Park (Island Circuit, Cheshire)	4 June	(United Kingdom) Will Tregurtha	(United Kingdom) Dave Wooder	(United Kingdom) Will Tregurtha	HHC Motorsport
4	R9	Oulton Park (Island Circuit, Cheshire)	5 June		(United Kingdom) Dave Wooder	(United Kingdom) Will Tregurtha	HHC Motorsport
5	R10	Croft Circuit (North Yorkshire)	18 June	(United Kingdom) Stuart Middleton	(United Kingdom) Cameron Roberts	(United Kingdom) Stuart Middleton	Douglas Motorsport
5	R11	Croft Circuit (North Yorkshire)	18 June		(United Kingdom) Daniel Harper	(United Kingdom) Stuart Middleton	Douglas Motorsport
5	R12	Croft Circuit (North Yorkshire)	19 June		(United Kingdom) Lewis Brown	(United Kingdom) Will Tregurtha	HHC Motorsport
6	R13	Snetterton Motor Racing Circuit (300 Circuit, Norfolk)	30 July	(United Kingdom) Will Tregurtha	(United Kingdom) Dave Wooder	(United Kingdom) Daniel Harper	Douglas Motorsport
6	R14	Snetterton Motor Racing Circuit (300 Circuit, Norfolk)	31 July		(United Kingdom) Daniel Harper	(United Kingdom) Harry King	Elite Motorsport
7	R15	Knockhill Racing Circuit (Fife)	13 August	(United Kingdom) Sebastian Priaulx	(United Kingdom) Stuart Middleton	(United Kingdom) Sebastian Perez	JHR Developments
7	R16	Knockhill Racing Circuit (Fife)	13 August		(United Kingdom) Daniel Harper	(United Kingdom) Geri Nicosia	JHR Developments
7	R17	Knockhill Racing Circuit (Fife)	14 August		(United Kingdom) Stuart Middleton	(United Kingdom) Will Tregurtha	HHC Motorsport
8	R18	Rockingham Motor Speedway (International Super Sports Car Circuit, Northamptonshire)	27 August	(United Kingdom) Will Tregurtha	(United Kingdom) Will Tregurtha	(United Kingdom) Stuart Middleton	Douglas Motorsport
8	R19	Rockingham Motor Speedway (International Super Sports Car Circuit, Northamptonshire)	27 August		(United Kingdom) Will Tregurtha	(United Kingdom) Will Tregurtha	HHC Motorsport
8	R20	Rockingham Motor Speedway (International Super Sports Car Circuit, Northamptonshire)	28 August		(United Kingdom) Will Tregurtha	(United Kingdom) Harry King	Elite Motorsport
9	R21	Silverstone Circuit (National Circuit, Northamptonshire)	17 September	(United Kingdom) Sebastian Priaulx	(United Kingdom) Lewis Brown	(United Kingdom) Dave Wooder	Total Control Racing
9	R22	Silverstone Circuit (National Circuit, Northamptonshire)	17 September		(United Kingdom) Sebastian Perez	(United Kingdom) Sebastian Priaulx	JHR Developments
9	R23	Silverstone Circuit (National Circuit, Northamptonshire)	18 September		(United Kingdom) Stuart Middleton	(United Kingdom) Dave Wooder	Total Control Racing
10	R24	Brands Hatch (Grand Prix Circuit, Kent)	1 October	(United Kingdom) Dave Wooder	(United Kingdom) Stuart Middleton	(United Kingdom) Stuart Middleton	Douglas Motorsport
10	R25	Brands Hatch (Grand Prix Circuit, Kent)	2 October		(United Kingdom) Geri Nicosia	(United Kingdom) Lewis Brown	HHC Motorsport

=== Calendar changes ===
- This season saw the re-introduction of the triple-header meetings, having last hosted a triple-header meeting in 2007.

== Championship standings ==
Points system
**1st**	**2nd**	**3rd**	**4th**	**5th**	**6th**	**7th**	**8th**	**9th**	**10th**	**11th**	**12th**	**13th**	**14th**	**15th**	**16th**	**17th**	**18th**	**19th**	**20th**	R1 PP	FL
35	30	26	22	20	18	16	14	12	11	10	9	8	7	6	5	4	3	2	1	1	1

=== Drivers' championship ===
- A driver's best 23 scores counted towards the championship, with any other points being discarded.

Pos	Driver	BHI		DON			THR		OUL		CRO			SNE		KNO			ROC			SIL			BHGP		Total	Drop	Pen.	Points
1	(United Kingdom) Will Tregurtha	1	**5**	5	4	3	2	2	**1**	**1**	10	5	1	**3**	2	5	4	1	**2**	1	5	5	4	2			615			615
2	(United Kingdom) Stuart Middleton	**2**	1	2	1	7	1	**7**	3	2	**1**	**1**	Ret	9	7	2	9	4	1	**2**	10	11	18	5	1	**3**	578	-3		575
3	(United Kingdom) Lewis Brown	14	3	**1**	**9**	2	6	5	6	5	8	4	**2**	5	4	12	6	**14**	3	4	4	4	16	10	2	1	507	-12		495
4	(United Kingdom) Dave Wooder	3	2	4	3	4	3	1	9	3	Ret	9	3	2	6	11	2	6	7	15	9	1	**2**	1	**Ret**	DNS	485		−6	479
5	(United Kingdom) Daniel Harper **(R)**	7	6	3	2	1	15	11	Ret	Ret	3	2	9	1	**3**	4	15	9	14	7	11	10	8	17	6	9	390			390
6	(United Kingdom) Geri Nicosia	8	7	10	5	9	9	6	5	5	12	7	4	8	8	6	1	3	13	8	6	17	9	11	7	6	396	-12		384
7	(United Kingdom) Sebastian Priaulx **(R)**	18	13	7	8	8	5	3	15	17	2	3	11	12	11	**3**	13	17	4	16	7	**2**	1	6	9	4	390	-7	−3	380
8	(United Kingdom) Harry King **(R)**	16	14	12	Ret	13	7	4	12	8	15	19	15	4	1	14	17	13	6	5	1	6	3	3	4	2	376	-2		374
9	(United Kingdom) Charlie Fagg	Ret	9	15	14	10	8	8	2	4	4	10	14	11	19	12	9	7	11	10	8	3	5	**4**	5	7	344	-2		342
10	(United Kingdom) Sebastian Perez	11	10	11	Ret	16	**18**	Ret	4	12	18	11	7	7	12	1	**8**	11	5	3	3	8	7	9	3	8	333			333
11	(United Kingdom) Tom Wood **(R)**	15	11	14	16	15	10	13	8	9	11	13	10	Ret	15	13	3	15	12	6	**2**	19	10	7	10	5	251		−6	245
12	(United Kingdom) Connor Grady	13	12	Ret	12	14	13	15	10	7	17	14	6	16	9	7	5	2	9	9				14	11	10	232		−1	231
13	(United Kingdom) Kyle Hornby	9	EX	8	15	11	12	7	7	Ret	9	8	Ret	6	5				8	12	14	9	6	8			221		−12	209
14	(United Kingdom) Cameron Roberts	6	4	19	6	**5**	4	14	NC	14	6	20	5			8	14	8									176			176
15	(United Kingdom) Tom Gamble **(R)**	5	8	6	13	13	11	10	17	10	7	6	Ret	10	10												160			160
16	(United Kingdom) Jordan Collard **(R)**	10	Ret	Ret	11	Ret	16	16	11	13	16	17	Ret	17	14	17	7	5	16	11	12	12	14	12	12	14	154		−1	153
17	(United Kingdom) Max Bird **(R)**	4	17	9	7	6	14	Ret	13	16	14	15	12	14	13				10	13	13						147		−6	141
18	(Brazil) Enzo Fittipaldi **(R)**	12	19	12	10	18	17	12	16	15	13	12	8	15	18	10	11	12									113			113
19	(United Kingdom) Olli Caldwell **(R)**										5	16	13	13	Ret	15	10	10				14	12	13	8	11	105			105
20	(United Kingdom) Anthony Ayres **(R)**	20	18	16	18	19	19	17	18	14				18	16							13	13	Ret	14	12	70			70
21	(United Kingdom) Greg Johnson **(R)**	21	Ret	18	19	17	20	18			19	21	16	DNS	DNS				15	14	16	18	15	Ret	Ret	13	55			55
22	(United Kingdom) Charlie Digby													21	21	16	16	16	17	17	15	16	19	16	Ret	DNS	35			35
23	(United Kingdom) Harry Dyson **(R)**																					7	11	Ret	13	Ret	34			34
24	(United States) Dhyllan Skiba **(R)**	19	16	17	17	Ret			14	Ret	Ret	18	17	20	20												31			31
25	(United Kingdom) Jenson Dineen **(R)**																		19	Ret	18	15	17	15	Ret	DNS	21			21
26	(United Kingdom) Zak Fulk **(R)**	17	15																								10			10
27	(United Kingdom) Conor O'Brien **(R)**																		18	18	17						10			10
28	(United Kingdom) Alex Day													19	17												6			6
Pos	Driver	BHI		DON			THR		OUL		CRO			SNE		KNO			ROC			SIL			BHGP		Total	Drop	Pen.	Points

Colour	Result
Gold	Winner
Silver	Second place
Bronze	Third place
Green	Points classification
Blue	Non-points classification
Blue	Non-classified finish (NC)
Purple	Retired, not classified (Ret)
Red	Did not qualify (DNQ)
Red	Did not pre-qualify (DNPQ)
Black	Disqualified (DSQ)
White	Did not start (DNS)
White	Withdrew (WD)
White	Race cancelled (C)
Blank	Did not practice (DNP)
Blank	Did not arrive (DNA)
Blank	Excluded (EX)

**Bold** – Pole
Italics – Fastest Lap
**(R)** – Rookie
