= 2025 Chevrolet Grand Prix =

Seventh round of the 2025 IMSA SportsCar Championship season

The layout of Canadian Tire Motorsports Park, where the race will be held

The 2025 Chevrolet Grand Prix is a sports car race that was held at Canadian Tire Motorsports Park in Bowmanville, Ontario, Canada, on July 13, 2025. It was the seventh round of the 2025 IMSA SportsCar Championship.

== Background ==
=== Preview ===
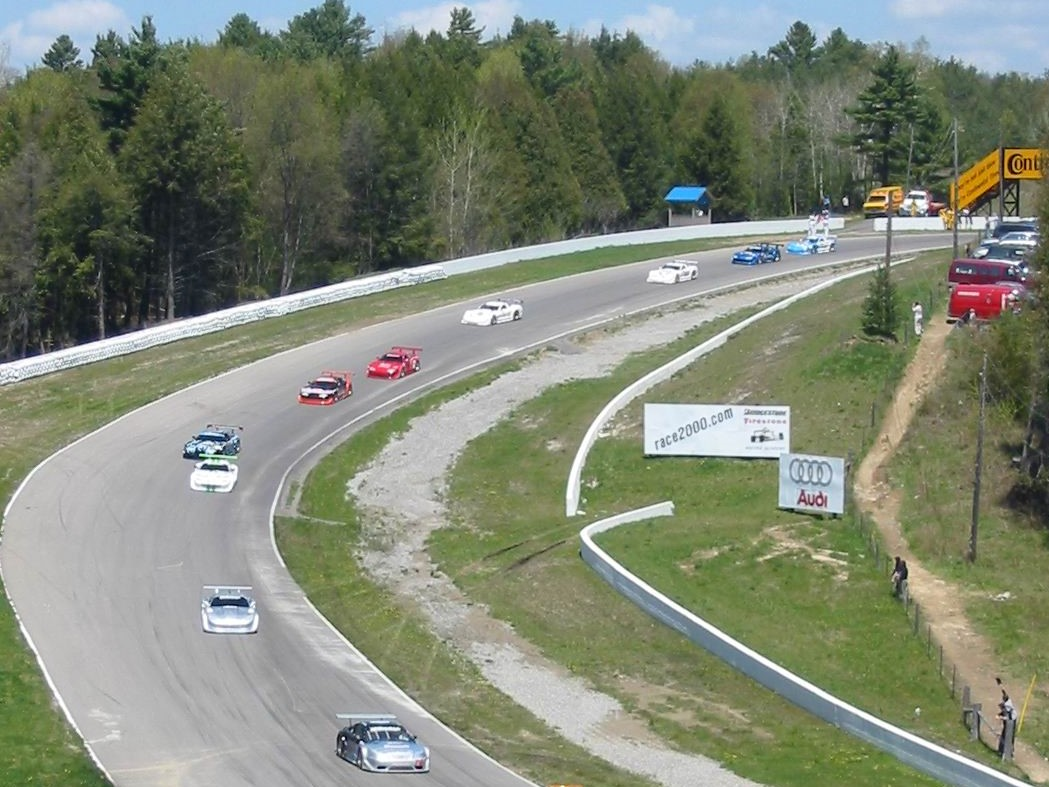
Canadian Tire Motorsports Park, where the race will be held

International Motor Sports Association (IMSA) president John Doonan confirmed the race was part of the schedule of the 2025 IMSA SportsCar Championship (IMSA SCC) in March 2024. It was the tenth time the IMSA SCC hosted a race at Mosport, and the second consecutive time the race was hosted at the Canadian Tire Motorsports Park. The 2025 Chevrolet Grand Prix was the seventh of eleven scheduled sports car races of 2025 by IMSA. The race was held at the ten-turn 2.459 mi (3.957 km) Canadian Tire Motorsports Park on July 13, 2025.

=== Standings before the race ===
Preceding the event, Dan Goldburg, Paul di Resta, and Rasmus Lindh led the LMP2 Drivers' Championship with 1023 points, 94 points ahead of Josh Burdon, Felipe Fraga, and Gar Robinson. Dane Cameron, Jonny Edgar, and P. J. Hyett were third, a further 17 points behind. The GTD Pro Drivers' Championship is led by Antonio García and Alexander Sims with 1632 points, 52 ahead of Klaus Bachler and Laurin Heinrich. Albert Costa was third, 114 points behind García and Sims. Philip Ellis and Russell Ward led the GTD Drivers' Championship with 1550 points, 60 points ahead of Casper Stevenson. Jack Hawksworth and Parker Thompson were third, 76 points behind Ellis and Ward. United Autosports USA, Corvette Racing by Pratt Miller Motorsports, and Winward Racing led their respective Teams' Championships, whilst Chevrolet and Mercedes-AMG were leading the GTD Pro and GTD Manufacturers' Championships, respectively.

== Entry list ==
The entry list was published on July 2, 2025, and featured 35 entries: 12 in LMP2, 10 in GTD Pro, and 13 in GTD. Kenton Koch and Onofrio Triarsi completed Triarsi Competizione's No. 021 lineup. Mathias Beche and Rodrigo Sales were originally listed to compete for PR1/Mathiasen Motorsports in the No. 52 entry, but were replaced by Nick Boulle and Benjamin Pedersen prior to the event.

No.	Entrant	Car	Driver 1	Driver 2
LMP2 (Le Mans Prototype 2) (12 entries)
04	(Portugal) CrowdStrike Racing by APR	Oreca 07-Gibson	(United States) George Kurtz	(United Kingdom) Alex Quinn
2	(United States) United Autosports USA	Oreca 07-Gibson	(Canada) Phil Fayer	(United Kingdom) Ben Hanley
8	(Canada) Tower Motorsports	Oreca 07-Gibson	(Canada) John Farano	(Netherlands) Renger van der Zande
11	(France) TDS Racing	Oreca 07-Gibson	(New Zealand) Hunter McElrea	(United States) Steven Thomas
18	(United States) Era Motorsport	Oreca 07-Gibson	(United Kingdom) Ryan Dalziel	(Canada) Travis Hill
22	(United States) United Autosports USA	Oreca 07-Gibson	(United Kingdom) Tom Blomqvist	(United States) Dan Goldburg
43	(Poland) Inter Europol Competition	Oreca 07-Gibson	(United States) Jeremy Clarke	(France) Tom Dillmann
52	(United States) PR1/Mathiasen Motorsports	Oreca 07-Gibson	(United States) Nick Boulle	(Denmark) Benjamin Pedersen
73	(United States) Pratt Miller Motorsports	Oreca 07-Gibson	(Canada) Chris Cumming	(Brazil) Pietro Fittipaldi
74	(United States) Riley	Oreca 07-Gibson	(Brazil) Felipe Fraga	(United States) Gar Robinson
79	(United States) JDC–Miller MotorSports	Oreca 07-Gibson	(Australia) Scott Andrews	(United States) Gerry Kraut
99	(United States) AO Racing	Oreca 07-Gibson	(United States) Dane Cameron	(United States) P. J. Hyett
GTD Pro (GT Daytona Pro) (10 entries)
1	(United States) Paul Miller Racing	BMW M4 GT3 Evo	(United States) Madison Snow	(United States) Neil Verhagen
3	(United States) Corvette Racing by Pratt Miller Motorsports	Chevrolet Corvette Z06 GT3.R	(Spain) Antonio García	(United Kingdom) Alexander Sims
4	(United States) Corvette Racing by Pratt Miller Motorsports	Chevrolet Corvette Z06 GT3.R	(Netherlands) Nicky Catsburg	(United States) Tommy Milner
9	(Canada) Pfaff Motorsports	Lamborghini Huracán GT3 Evo 2	(Italy) Andrea Caldarelli	(Italy) Marco Mapelli
14	(United States) Vasser Sullivan Racing	Lexus RC F GT3	(United Kingdom) Ben Barnicoat	(United States) Aaron Telitz
48	(United States) Paul Miller Racing	BMW M4 GT3 Evo	(United Kingdom) Dan Harper	(Germany) Max Hesse
64	(Canada) Ford Multimatic Motorsports	Ford Mustang GT3	(United Kingdom) Sebastian Priaulx	(Germany) Mike Rockenfeller
65	(Canada) Ford Multimatic Motorsports	Ford Mustang GT3	(Germany) Christopher Mies	(Belgium) Frédéric Vervisch
77	(United States) AO Racing	Porsche 911 GT3 R (992)	(Austria) Klaus Bachler	(Germany) Laurin Heinrich
81	(United States) DragonSpeed	Ferrari 296 GT3	(Italy) Giacomo Altoè	(Spain) Albert Costa
GTD (GT Daytona) (13 entries)
021	(United States) Triarsi Competizione	Ferrari 296 GT3	(United States) Kenton Koch	(United States) Onofrio Triarsi
12	(United States) Vasser Sullivan Racing	Lexus RC F GT3	(United Kingdom) Jack Hawksworth	(Canada) Parker Thompson
13	(Canada) AWA	Chevrolet Corvette Z06 GT3.R	(United Kingdom) Matt Bell	(Canada) Orey Fidani
27	(United States) Heart of Racing Team	Aston Martin Vantage AMR GT3 Evo	(Canada) Roman De Angelis	(United Kingdom) Casper Stevenson
34	(United States) Conquest Racing	Ferrari 296 GT3	(United States) Manny Franco	(Brazil) Daniel Serra
36	(United States) DXDT Racing	Chevrolet Corvette Z06 GT3.R	(United States) Alec Udell	(Canada) Robert Wickens
45	(United States) Wayne Taylor Racing	Lamborghini Huracán GT3 Evo 2	(Costa Rica) Danny Formal	(United States) Trent Hindman
57	(United States) Winward Racing	Mercedes-AMG GT3 Evo	(Switzerland) Philip Ellis	(United States) Russell Ward
66	(United States) Gradient Racing	Ford Mustang GT3	(United States) Jenson Altzman	(United States) Robert Megennis
70	(United Kingdom) Inception Racing	Ferrari 296 GT3	(United States) Brendan Iribe	(Denmark) Frederik Schandorff
78	(United States) Forte Racing	Lamborghini Huracán GT3 Evo 2	(Germany) Mario Farnbacher	(Canada) Misha Goikhberg
96	(United States) Turner Motorsport	BMW M4 GT3 Evo	(United States) Robby Foley	(United States) Patrick Gallagher
120	(United States) Wright Motorsports	Porsche 911 GT3 R (992)	(United States) Adam Adelson	(United States) Elliott Skeer

== Practice ==
Two practice sessions were held preceding the start of the race on Sunday, one on Friday and on Saturday. The first session lasted 90 minutes Friday afternoon, and the second session on Saturday morning also lasted 90 minutes.

=== Practice 1 ===
The first practice took place at 1:55 pm ET on Friday. Renger van der Zande topped the session in the No. 8 Tower Motorsports Oreca, with a lap time of 1:08.402. Ben Hanley was second-quickest in the No. 2 United Autosports USA Oreca, 0.104 seconds behind Van der Zande. Andrea Caldarelli paced the GTD Pro class in his No. 9 Pfaff Motorsports Lamborghini, with a 1-minute, 15.580-second lap time. Nicky Catsburg set the second-best time in the No. 4 Pratt Miller Motorsports Corvette, with a lap time of 1:16.040. The GTD class was topped by Jack Hawksworth in the No. 12 Vasser Sullivan Racing Lexus, with a lap time of 1:16.323. Hawksworth's lap was 0.089 seconds quicker than that of second-placed Philip Ellis in the No. 57 Winward Racing Mercedes. The session saw one stoppage, after an early crash from Steven Thomas in the No. 11 TDS Racing Oreca.

Pos.	Class	No.	Team	Driver	Time	Gap
1	LMP2	8	(Canada) Tower Motorsports	(Netherlands) Renger van der Zande	1:08.402	—
2	LMP2	2	(United States) United Autosports USA	(United Kingdom) Ben Hanley	1:08.506	+0.104
3	LMP2	99	(United States) AO Racing	(United States) Dane Cameron	1:08.702	+0.300

=== Practice 2 ===
The second and final practice session took place at 10:35 am ET on Saturday and ended with Van der Zande once again topping the time sheets in the No. 8 Tower Oreca, with a lap time of 1:08.175. His lap was 0.325 seconds quicker than that of second-placed Dan Goldburg in the No. 22 United Oreca, with Felipe Fraga setting the third-quickest time in the No. 74 Riley Oreca. Aaron Telitz claimed the top spot in the GTD Pro class in his No. 14 Vasser Sullivan Lexus, lapping the circuit in 1 minute and 15.270 seconds. Antonio García was second-quickest in the No. 3 Chevrolet, 0.233 seconds behind Telitz. Hawksworth once again topped the GTD class in the sister No. 12 Lexus with a 1-minute, 15.597-second lap time, ahead of Robert Wickens in the No. 36 DXDT Racing Chevrolet.

Pos.	Class	No.	Team	Driver	Time	Gap
1	LMP2	8	(Canada) Tower Motorsports	(Netherlands) Renger van der Zande	1:08.175	—
2	LMP2	22	(United States) United Autosports USA	(United States) Dan Goldburg	1:08.500	+0.325
3	LMP2	74	(United States) Riley	(Brazil) Felipe Fraga	1:08.512	+0.337

== Qualifying ==
=== Qualifying results ===
Pole positions in each class are indicated in bold and with ‡.

Pos.	Class	No.	Entry	Driver	Time	Gap	Grid
1	**LMP2**	**99**	**(United States) AO Racing**	**(United States) P. J. Hyett**	**1:08.888**	—	1‡
2	LMP2	22	(United States) United Autosports USA	(United States) Dan Goldburg	1:08.986	+0.098	2
3	LMP2	11	(France) TDS Racing	(United States) Steven Thomas	1:09.179	+0.291	3
4	LMP2	43	(Poland) Inter Europol Competition	(United States) Jeremy Clarke	1:09.347	+0.459	4
5	LMP2	04	(Portugal) CrowdStrike Racing by APR	(United States) George Kurtz	1:09.673	+0.785	5
6	LMP2	73	(United States) Pratt Miller Motorsports	(Canada) Chris Cumming	1:09.733	+0.845	6
7	LMP2	2	(United States) United Autosports USA	(Canada) Phil Fayer	1:09.910	+1.022	7
8	LMP2	52	(United States) PR1/Mathiasen Motorsports	(United States) Nick Boulle	1:09.994	+1.106	8
9	LMP2	74	(United States) Riley	(United States) Gar Robinson	1:10.286	+1.398	9
10	LMP2	18	(United States) Era Motorsport	(Canada) Travis Hill	1:10.778	+1.890	10
11	LMP2	8	(United States) Tower Motorsports	(Canada) John Farano	1:12.361	+3.473	11
12	LMP2	79	(United States) JDC–Miller MotorSports	(United States) Gerry Kraut	1:13.837	+4.949	WD
13	**GTD Pro**	**1**	**(United States) Paul Miller Racing**	**(United States) Neil Verhagen**	**1:15.046**	**+6.158**	12‡
14	**GTD**	**12**	**(United States) Vasser Sullivan Racing**	**(United Kingdom) Jack Hawksworth**	**1:15.101**	**+6.213**	22‡
15	GTD Pro	14	(United States) Vasser Sullivan Racing	(United States) Aaron Telitz	1:15.309	+6.421	13
16	GTD	57	(United States) Winward Racing	(United States) Russell Ward	1:15.319	+6.431	23
17	GTD Pro	3	(United States) Corvette Racing by Pratt Miller Motorsports	(Spain) Antonio García	1:15.334	+6.446	14
18	GTD Pro	4	(United States) Corvette Racing by Pratt Miller Motorsports	(United States) Tommy Milner	1:15.464	+6.576	15
19	GTD Pro	48	(United States) Paul Miller Racing	(United Kingdom) Dan Harper	1:15.478	+6.590	16
20	GTD Pro	9	(Canada) Pfaff Motorsports	(Italy) Andrea Caldarelli	1:15.588	+6.700	17
21	GTD Pro	64	(Canada) Ford Multimatic Motorsports	(United Kingdom) Sebastian Priaulx	1:15.687	+6.799	18
22	GTD Pro	77	(United States) AO Racing	(Austria) Klaus Bachler	1:15.747	+6.859	19
23	GTD Pro	65	(Canada) Ford Multimatic Motorsports	(Belgium) Frédéric Vervisch	1:15.800	+6.912	20
24	GTD	36	(United States) DXDT Racing	(Canada) Robert Wickens	1:15.876	+6.988	24
25	GTD Pro	81	(United States) DragonSpeed	(Italy) Giacomo Altoè	1:16.000	+7.112	21
26	GTD	27	(United States) Heart of Racing Team	(United Kingdom) Casper Stevenson	1:16.061	+7.173	25
27	GTD	45	(United States) Wayne Taylor Racing	(Costa Rica) Danny Formal	1:16.199	+7.311	26
28	GTD	96	(United States) Turner Motorsport	(United States) Patrick Gallagher	1:16.270	+7.382	27
29	GTD	120	(United States) Wright Motorsports	(United States) Elliott Skeer	1:16.392	+7.504	28
30	GTD	021	(United States) Triarsi Competizione	(United States) Onofrio Triarsi	1:16.427	+7.539	29
31	GTD	34	(United States) Conquest Racing	(United States) Manny Franco	1:16.626	+7.738	30
32	GTD	78	(United States) Forte Racing	(Canada) Misha Goikhberg	1:16.687	+7.799	31
33	GTD	70	(United Kingdom) Inception Racing	(United States) Brendan Iribe	1:16.818	+7.930	32
34	GTD	66	(United States) Gradient Racing	(United States) Jenson Altzman	1:16.939	+8.051	33
35	GTD	13	(Canada) AWA	(Canada) Orey Fidani	1:17.914	+9.026	34

== Race ==
=== Post-race ===
The final results of LMP2 kept Goldburg atop the LMP2 Drivers' Championship with 1375 points, 78 ahead of race-winners Cameron and Hyett. The final results of GTD Pro allowed García and Sims to extend their advantage to 39 points over Bachler and Heinrich in the GTD Pro Drivers' Championship. The final results of GTD kept Ellis and ward atop the GTD Drivers' Championship, 93 points ahead of third-place finishers Hawksworth and Thompson. United Autosports USA, Corvette Racing by Pratt Miller Motorsports, and Winward Racing continued to top their respective Teams' Championships. Chevrolet and Mercedes-AMG continued to their Manufacturers' Championship with 4 rounds remaining in the season.

Class winners are in bold and ‡.

Pos	Class	No	Team	Drivers	Chassis	Laps	Time/Retired
Pos	Class	No	Team	Drivers	Engine	Laps	Time/Retired
1	**LMP2**	**99**	**(United States) AO Racing**	**(United States) Dane Cameron (United States) P. J. Hyett**	**Oreca 07**	**113**	**2:40:43.681‡**
1	**LMP2**	**99**	**(United States) AO Racing**	**(United States) Dane Cameron (United States) P. J. Hyett**	**Gibson GK428 4.2 L V8**	**113**	**2:40:43.681‡**
2	LMP2	22	(United States) United Autosports USA	(United Kingdom) Tom Blomqvist (United States) Dan Goldburg	Oreca 07	113	+1.087
2	LMP2	22	(United States) United Autosports USA	(United Kingdom) Tom Blomqvist (United States) Dan Goldburg	Gibson GK428 4.2 L V8	113	+1.087
3	LMP2	74	(United States) Riley	(Brazil) Felipe Fraga (United States) Gar Robinson	Oreca 07	113	+3.169
3	LMP2	74	(United States) Riley	(Brazil) Felipe Fraga (United States) Gar Robinson	Gibson GK428 4.2 L V8	113	+3.169
4	LMP2	2	(United States) United Autosports USA	(Canada) Phil Fayer (United Kingdom) Ben Hanley	Oreca 07	113	+4.149
4	LMP2	2	(United States) United Autosports USA	(Canada) Phil Fayer (United Kingdom) Ben Hanley	Gibson GK428 4.2 L V8	113	+4.149
5	LMP2	52	(United States) PR1/Mathiasen Motorsports	(United States) Nick Boulle (Denmark) Benjamin Pedersen	Oreca 07	113	+4.380
5	LMP2	52	(United States) PR1/Mathiasen Motorsports	(United States) Nick Boulle (Denmark) Benjamin Pedersen	Gibson GK428 4.2 L V8	113	+4.380
6	LMP2	73	(United States) Pratt Miller Motorsports	(Canada) Chris Cumming (Brazil) Pietro Fittipaldi	Oreca 07	113	+4.584
6	LMP2	73	(United States) Pratt Miller Motorsports	(Canada) Chris Cumming (Brazil) Pietro Fittipaldi	Gibson GK428 4.2 L V8	113	+4.584
7	LMP2	18	(United States) Era Motorsport	(United Kingdom) Ryan Dalziel (Canada) Travis Hill	Oreca 07	113	+5.125
7	LMP2	18	(United States) Era Motorsport	(United Kingdom) Ryan Dalziel (Canada) Travis Hill	Gibson GK428 4.2 L V8	113	+5.125
8	LMP2	11	(France) TDS Racing	(New Zealand) Hunter McElrea (United States) Steven Thomas	Oreca 07	113	+30.297
8	LMP2	11	(France) TDS Racing	(New Zealand) Hunter McElrea (United States) Steven Thomas	Gibson GK428 4.2 L V8	113	+30.297
9	LMP2	8	(United States) Tower Motorsports	(Canada) John Farano (Netherlands) Renger van der Zande	Oreca 07	110	+3 Laps
9	LMP2	8	(United States) Tower Motorsports	(Canada) John Farano (Netherlands) Renger van der Zande	Gibson GK428 4.2 L V8	110	+3 Laps
10	**GTD Pro**	**81**	**(United States) DragonSpeed**	**(Italy) Giacomo Altoè (Spain) Albert Costa**	**Ferrari 296 GT3**	**108**	**+5 Laps‡**
10	**GTD Pro**	**81**	**(United States) DragonSpeed**	**(Italy) Giacomo Altoè (Spain) Albert Costa**	**Ferrari F163CE 3.0 L Turbo V6**	**108**	**+5 Laps‡**
11	GTD Pro	4	(United States) Corvette Racing by Pratt Miller Motorsports	(Netherlands) Nicky Catsburg (United States) Tommy Milner	Chevrolet Corvette Z06 GT3.R	108	+5 Laps
11	GTD Pro	4	(United States) Corvette Racing by Pratt Miller Motorsports	(Netherlands) Nicky Catsburg (United States) Tommy Milner	Chevrolet LT6 5.5 L V8	108	+5 Laps
12	GTD Pro	77	(United States) AO Racing	(Austria) Klaus Bachler (Germany) Laurin Heinrich	Porsche 911 GT3 R (992)	108	+5 Laps
12	GTD Pro	77	(United States) AO Racing	(Austria) Klaus Bachler (Germany) Laurin Heinrich	Porsche M97/80 4.2 L Flat-6	108	+5 Laps
13	GTD Pro	3	(United States) Corvette Racing by Pratt Miller Motorsports	(Spain) Antonio García (United Kingdom) Alexander Sims	Chevrolet Corvette Z06 GT3.R	108	+5 Laps
13	GTD Pro	3	(United States) Corvette Racing by Pratt Miller Motorsports	(Spain) Antonio García (United Kingdom) Alexander Sims	Chevrolet LT6 5.5 L V8	108	+5 Laps
14	GTD Pro	9	(Canada) Pfaff Motorsports	(Italy) Andrea Caldarelli (Italy) Marco Mapelli	Lamborghini Huracán GT3 Evo 2	108	+5 Laps
14	GTD Pro	9	(Canada) Pfaff Motorsports	(Italy) Andrea Caldarelli (Italy) Marco Mapelli	Lamborghini DGF 5.2 L V10	108	+5 Laps
15	GTD Pro	1	(United States) Paul Miller Racing	(United States) Madison Snow (United States) Neil Verhagen	BMW M4 GT3 Evo	108	+5 Laps
15	GTD Pro	1	(United States) Paul Miller Racing	(United States) Madison Snow (United States) Neil Verhagen	BMW P58 3.0 L Turbo I6	108	+5 Laps
16	GTD Pro	65	(Canada) Ford Multimatic Motorsports	(Germany) Christopher Mies (Belgium) Frédéric Vervisch	Ford Mustang GT3	108	+5 Laps
16	GTD Pro	65	(Canada) Ford Multimatic Motorsports	(Germany) Christopher Mies (Belgium) Frédéric Vervisch	Ford Coyote 5.4 L V8	108	+5 Laps
17	GTD Pro	14	(United States) Vasser Sullivan Racing	(United Kingdom) Ben Barnicoat (United States) Aaron Telitz	Lexus RC F GT3	108	+5 Laps
17	GTD Pro	14	(United States) Vasser Sullivan Racing	(United Kingdom) Ben Barnicoat (United States) Aaron Telitz	Toyota 2UR-GSE 5.4 L V8	108	+5 Laps
18	GTD Pro	48	(United States) Paul Miller Racing	(United Kingdom) Dan Harper (Germany) Max Hesse	BMW M4 GT3 Evo	108	+5 Laps
18	GTD Pro	48	(United States) Paul Miller Racing	(United Kingdom) Dan Harper (Germany) Max Hesse	BMW P58 3.0 L Turbo I6	108	+5 Laps
19	GTD Pro	64	(Canada) Ford Multimatic Motorsports	(United Kingdom) Sebastian Priaulx (Germany) Mike Rockenfeller	Ford Mustang GT3	108	+5 Laps
19	GTD Pro	64	(Canada) Ford Multimatic Motorsports	(United Kingdom) Sebastian Priaulx (Germany) Mike Rockenfeller	Ford Coyote 5.4 L V8	108	+5 Laps
20	**GTD**	**45**	**(United States) Wayne Taylor Racing**	**(Costa Rica) Danny Formal (United States) Trent Hindman**	**Lamborghini Huracán GT3 Evo 2**	**108**	**+5 Laps‡**
20	**GTD**	**45**	**(United States) Wayne Taylor Racing**	**(Costa Rica) Danny Formal (United States) Trent Hindman**	**Lamborghini DGF 5.2 L V10**	**108**	**+5 Laps‡**
21	GTD	57	(United States) Winward Racing	(Switzerland) Philip Ellis (United States) Russell Ward	Mercedes-AMG GT3 Evo	108	+5 Laps
21	GTD	57	(United States) Winward Racing	(Switzerland) Philip Ellis (United States) Russell Ward	Mercedes-Benz M159 6.2 L V8	108	+5 Laps
22	GTD	12	(United States) Vasser Sullivan Racing	(United Kingdom) Jack Hawksworth (Canada) Parker Thompson	Lexus RC F GT3	108	+5 Laps
22	GTD	12	(United States) Vasser Sullivan Racing	(United Kingdom) Jack Hawksworth (Canada) Parker Thompson	Toyota 2UR-GSE 5.4 L V8	108	+5 Laps
23	GTD	36	(United States) DXDT Racing	(United States) Alec Udell (Canada) Robert Wickens	Chevrolet Corvette Z06 GT3.R	108	+5 Laps
23	GTD	36	(United States) DXDT Racing	(United States) Alec Udell (Canada) Robert Wickens	Chevrolet LT6 5.5 L V8	108	+5 Laps
24	GTD	27	(United States) Heart of Racing Team	(Canada) Roman De Angelis (United Kingdom) Casper Stevenson	Aston Martin Vantage AMR GT3 Evo	108	+5 Laps
24	GTD	27	(United States) Heart of Racing Team	(Canada) Roman De Angelis (United Kingdom) Casper Stevenson	Aston Martin M177 4.0 L Turbo V8	108	+5 Laps
25	GTD	70	(United Kingdom) Inception Racing	(United States) Brendan Iribe (Denmark) Frederik Schandorff	Ferrari 296 GT3	108	+5 Laps
25	GTD	70	(United Kingdom) Inception Racing	(United States) Brendan Iribe (Denmark) Frederik Schandorff	Ferrari F163CE 3.0 L Turbo V6	108	+5 Laps
26	GTD	021	(United States) Triarsi Competizione	(United States) Kenton Koch (United States) Onofrio Triarsi	Ferrari 296 GT3	108	+5 Laps
26	GTD	021	(United States) Triarsi Competizione	(United States) Kenton Koch (United States) Onofrio Triarsi	Ferrari F163CE 3.0 L Turbo V6	108	+5 Laps
27	GTD	96	(United States) Turner Motorsport	(United States) Robby Foley (United States) Patrick Gallagher	BMW M4 GT3 Evo	108	+5 Laps
27	GTD	96	(United States) Turner Motorsport	(United States) Robby Foley (United States) Patrick Gallagher	BMW P58 3.0 L Turbo I6	108	+5 Laps
28	GTD	13	(Canada) AWA	(United Kingdom) Matt Bell (Canada) Orey Fidani	Chevrolet Corvette Z06 GT3.R	108	+5 Laps
28	GTD	13	(Canada) AWA	(United Kingdom) Matt Bell (Canada) Orey Fidani	Chevrolet LT6 5.5 L V8	108	+5 Laps
29	GTD	120	(United States) Wright Motorsports	(United States) Adam Adelson (United States) Elliott Skeer	Porsche 911 GT3 R (992)	108	+5 Laps
29	GTD	120	(United States) Wright Motorsports	(United States) Adam Adelson (United States) Elliott Skeer	Porsche M97/80 4.2 L Flat-6	108	+5 Laps
30	GTD	34	(United States) Conquest Racing	(United States) Manny Franco (Brazil) Daniel Serra	Ferrari 296 GT3	108	+5 Laps
30	GTD	34	(United States) Conquest Racing	(United States) Manny Franco (Brazil) Daniel Serra	Ferrari F163CE 3.0 L Turbo V6	108	+5 Laps
31	GTD	66	(United States) Gradient Racing	(United States) Jenson Altzman (United States) Robert Megennis	Ford Mustang GT3	108	+5 Laps
31	GTD	66	(United States) Gradient Racing	(United States) Jenson Altzman (United States) Robert Megennis	Ford Coyote 5.4 L V8	108	+5 Laps
32 DNF	LMP2	43	(Poland) Inter Europol Competition	(United States) Jeremy Clarke (France) Tom Dillmann	Oreca 07	106	Crash
32 DNF	LMP2	43	(Poland) Inter Europol Competition	(United States) Jeremy Clarke (France) Tom Dillmann	Gibson GK428 4.2 L V8	106	Crash
33	GTD	78	(United States) Forte Racing	(Germany) Mario Farnbacher (Canada) Misha Goikhberg	Lamborghini Huracán GT3 Evo 2	105	+8 Laps
33	GTD	78	(United States) Forte Racing	(Germany) Mario Farnbacher (Canada) Misha Goikhberg	Lamborghini DGF 5.2 L V10	105	+8 Laps
34 DNF	LMP2	04	(Portugal) CrowdStrike Racing by APR	(United States) George Kurtz (United Kingdom) Alex Quinn	Oreca 07	53	Retired
34 DNF	LMP2	04	(Portugal) CrowdStrike Racing by APR	(United States) George Kurtz (United Kingdom) Alex Quinn	Gibson GK428 4.2 L V8	53	Retired
35 DNS	LMP2	79	(United States) JDC–Miller MotorSports	(Australia) Scott Andrews (United States) Gerry Kraut	Oreca 07	0	Withdrew
35 DNS	LMP2	79	(United States) JDC–Miller MotorSports	(Australia) Scott Andrews (United States) Gerry Kraut	Gibson GK428 4.2 L V8	0	Withdrew

== Standings after the race ==
GTP Drivers' Championship standings
Pos.	+/–	Driver	Points
1		(France) Mathieu Jaminet (Australia) Matt Campbell	2028
2		(Brazil) Felipe Nasr (United Kingdom) Nick Tandy	2016
3		(United Kingdom) Nick Yelloly (Netherlands) Renger van der Zande	1766
4		(Austria) Philipp Eng (Belgium) Dries Vanthoor	1753
5		(Portugal) Filipe Albuquerque (United States) Ricky Taylor	1749

LMP2 Drivers' Championship standings
Pos.	+/–	Driver	Points
1		(United States) Dan Goldburg	1375
2	1	(United States) Dane Cameron (United States) P. J. Hyett	1297
3	1	(Brazil) Felipe Fraga (United States) Gar Robinson	1251
4	1	(France) Tom Dillmann	1095
5	1	(United States) George Kurtz	1092

GTD Pro Drivers' Championship standings
Pos.	+/–	Driver	Points
1		(Spain) Antonio García (United Kingdom) Alexander Sims	1942
2		(Austria) Klaus Bachler (Germany) Laurin Heinrich	1903
3		(Spain) Albert Costa	1889
4	1	(United Kingdom) Dan Harper (Germany) Max Hesse	1756
5	1	(United Kingdom) Sebastian Priaulx (Germany) Mike Rockenfeller	1751

GTD Drivers' Championship standings
Pos.	+/–	Driver	Points
1		(Switzerland) Philip Ellis (United States) Russell Ward	1902
2	1	(United Kingdom) Jack Hawksworth (Canada) Parker Thompson	1809
3	1	(United Kingdom) Casper Stevenson	1778
4		(United States) Adam Adelson (United States) Elliott Skeer	1596
5		(United States) Robby Foley (United States) Patrick Gallagher	1584

Note: Only the top five positions are included for all sets of standings.

GTP Teams' Championship standings
Pos.	+/–	Team	Points
1		(Germany) #6 Porsche Penske Motorsport	2028
2		(Germany) #7 Porsche Penske Motorsport	2016
3		(United States) #93 Acura Meyer Shank Racing w/ Curb-Agajanian	1766
4		(United States) #24 BMW M Team RLL	1753
5		(United States) #10 Cadillac Wayne Taylor Racing	1749

LMP2 Teams' Championship standings
Pos.	+/–	Team	Points
1		(United States) #22 United Autosports USA	1375
2	1	(United States) #99 AO Racing	1297
3	1	(United States) #74 Riley	1251
4	1	(Poland) #43 Inter Europol Competition	1095
5	1	(Portugal) #04 CrowdStrike Racing by APR	1092

GTD Pro Teams' Championship standings
Pos.	+/–	Team	Points
1		(United States) #3 Corvette Racing by Pratt Miller Motorsports	1942
2		(United States) #77 AO Racing	1903
3		(United States) #81 DragonSpeed	1889
4	1	(United States) #48 Paul Miller Racing	1756
5	1	(Canada) #64 Ford Multimatic Motorsports	1751

GTD Teams' Championship standings
Pos.	+/–	Team	Points
1		(United States) #57 Winward Racing	1902
2	1	(United States) #12 Vasser Sullivan Racing	1809
3	1	(United States) #27 Heart of Racing Team	1778
4		(United States) #120 Wright Motorsports	1596
5		(United States) #96 Turner Motorsport	1584

Note: Only the top five positions are included for all sets of standings.

GTP Manufacturers' Championship standings
Pos.	+/–	Manufacturer	Points
1		(Germany) Porsche	2182
2		(Japan) Acura	2092
3		(United States) Cadillac	1974
4		(Germany) BMW	1962
5		(United Kingdom) Aston Martin	1439

GTD Pro Manufacturers' Championship standings
Pos.	+/–	Manufacturer	Points
1		(United States) Chevrolet	2018
2	1	(Germany) Porsche	1951
3	2	(Italy) Ferrari	1939
4	2	(Germany) BMW	1933
5	1	(United States) Ford	1900

GTD Manufacturers' Championship standings
Pos.	+/–	Manufacturer	Points
1		(Germany) Mercedes-AMG	2086
2		(Japan) Lexus	1912
3		(United Kingdom) Aston Martin	1859
4	1	(Italy) Ferrari	1827
5	1	(Germany) Porsche	1812

Note: Only the top five positions are included for all sets of standings.

IMSA SportsCar Championship
Previous race: Sahlen's Six Hours of The Glen	2025 season	Next race: SportsCar Grand Prix
