= Stuart Middleton =

British racing driver (born 1999)

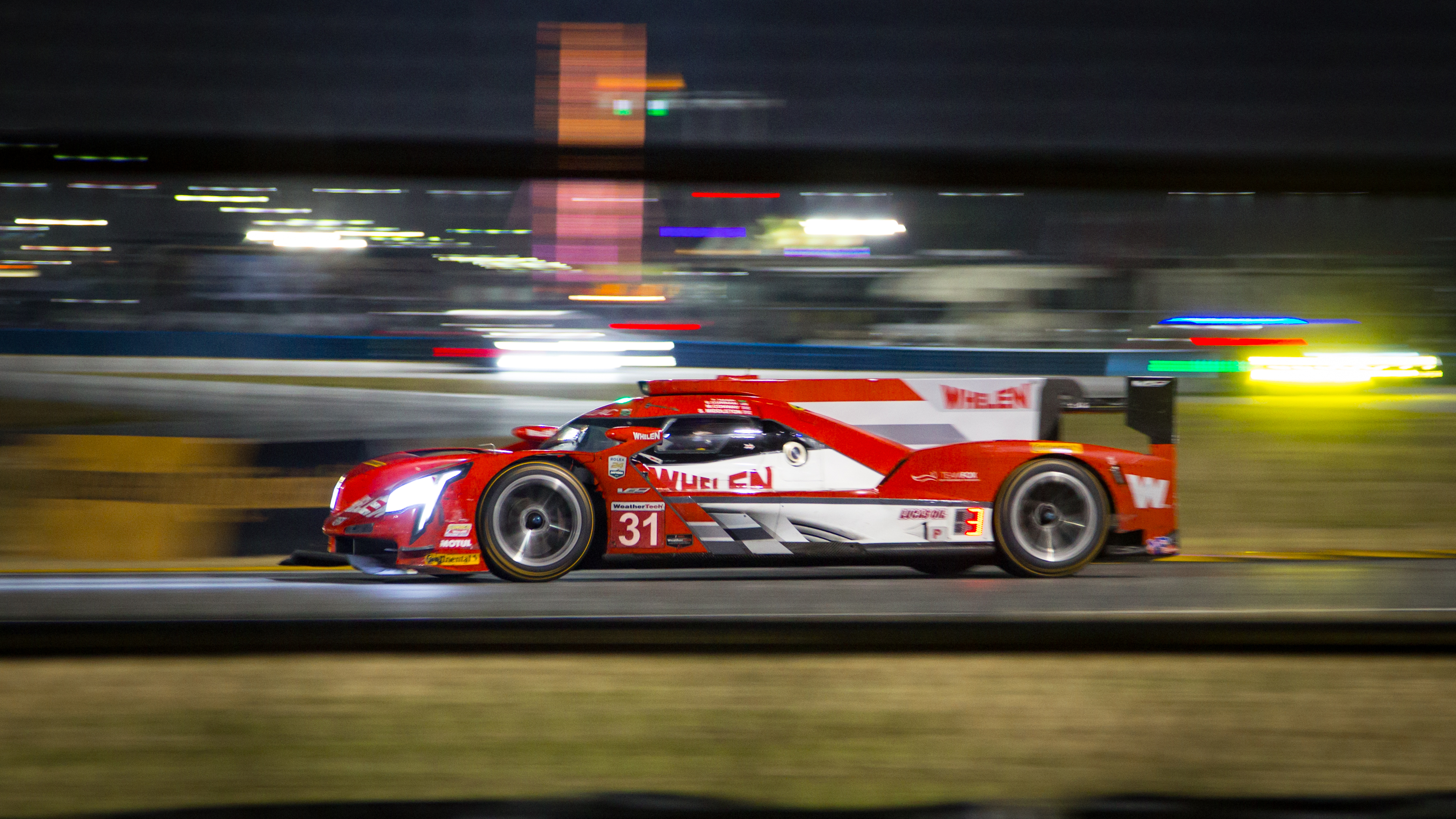
- Middleton at the 2018 24 Hours of Daytona
- Nationality: (United Kingdom) British
- Born: 11 October 1999 (age 27) Ashington, England

British GT Championship
- Categorisation: FIA Silver
- Years active: 2017, 2023–2024
- Teams: DTO Motorsport; Team CMR; Raceway Motorsport; HHC Motorsport
- Starts: 22
- Wins: 3
- Podiums: 8
- Poles: 3
- Fastest laps: 1
- Best finish: 1st (GT4) in 2017

Championship titles
- 2017 2017 2015: British GT – GT4 Silver; British GT – GT4; Ginetta Junior Winter Series

Awards
- 2018: Sunoco Whelen Challenge

Stuart John Middleton (born 11 October 1999) is a British racing driver. He is best known for finishing second at the 2018 24 Hours of Daytona, driving a Cadillac DPi-V.R for Action Express Racing, having earned the drive via the Sunoco Whelen Challenge.

Middleton was previously Ginetta Junior runner-up in 2016, before joining forces with title rival Will Tregurtha in GT4. Together they won the British GT Championship in 2017 and missed out on the GT4 European Series title on countback in 2018. Middleton has since won in Lamborghini machinery at Super Trofeo and GT3 level.

== Career ==
Born in Ashington, Middleton began karting at the age of six, during which he won the Ginetta Junior Scholarship in late 2014 to secure a fully-funded drive for the following year's Ginetta Junior Championship. Racing for Douglas Motorsport in his rookie season, Middleton finished third at Thruxton from pole, before taking a pair of second-place finishes at Rockingham to end the year seventh in the overall standings. After winning the Winter Series title in late 2015, Middleton returned to Douglas for the 2016 season. In his second campaign, Middleton took five wins in the first five rounds, including a double at Croft, and then won twice more after the summer break to secure runner-up honours behind Will Tregurtha.

In 2017, Middleton moved up to the GT4 class of the British GT Championship for HHC Motorsport, sharing a Ginetta G55 GT4 with Ginetta Juniors title rival Tregurtha. In his maiden season in the series, Middleton scored overall GT4 wins at Rockingham and Snetterton, and took five other podiums to clinch the overall and Silver Cup titles. Towards the end of the year, Middleton won the Sunoco Whelen Challenge, earning him a fully-funded drive at the 2018 24 Hours of Daytona for Action Express Racing's Prototype squad. On his IMSA debut, Middleton finished second at the Floridian enduro in the team's Cadillac DPi-V.R, alongside Mike Conway, Eric Curran and Felipe Nasr. For the rest of the year, Middleton returned to HHC Motorsport to enter the GT4 European Series alongside Tregurtha. In his only season in the series, Middleton took wins at Zolder and Brands Hatch, as well as four other podiums to clinch runner-up honours in the Silver Cup on countback, as the top three all finished level on points.

Moving to Lamborghini Super Trofeo Europe with Bonaldi Motorsport, Middleton began 2019 with a win at Silverstone, before taking further wins at Spa and Jerez to end the year third in the Pro standings alongside Jack Bartholomew. Switching to its North American counter part with Prestige Performance/Wayne Taylor Racing for 2020, as part of the Lamborghini Young Driver Programme, Middleton took six podiums to end the year fourth among the Pro entries alongside Stevan McAleer.

Graduating to GT3 for 2021, Middleton joined Imperiale Racing to race a Lamborghini Huracán GT3 Evo in the Italian GT Championship Endurance Cup alongside Andrea Amici and Alberto Di Folco. The trio won at Mugello and missed the podium only once in the four-race season to clinch runner-up honours overall. In 2022, Middleton remained with Di Folco to race for Imperiale in Italian GT's Sprint Cup. At the start of the season at Monza, Middleton was hit by another car during the driver change procedure in race one, leaving him with multiple injuries and unable to compete in race two. Returning for the following round at Misano, Middleton bounced back with wins at Imola and Mugello to end the year sixth in the overall standings, two spots behind Di Folco.

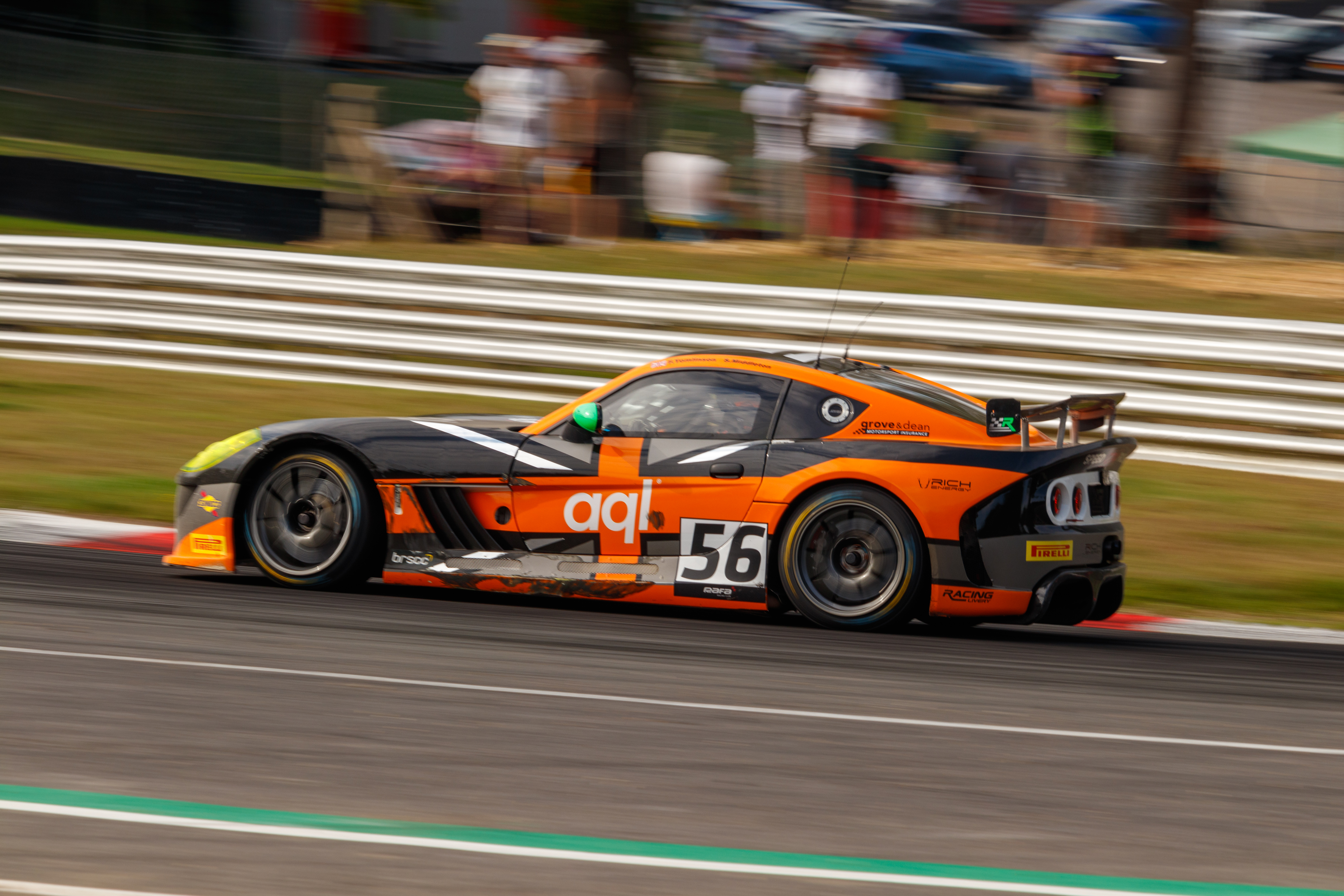
Middleton's Ginetta G56 GT4 at Brands Hatch in British GT in 2023.

Teaming up with Kevin Gilardoni and Raúl Guzmán at Imperiale for 2023, Middleton returned to the Italian GT Endurance Cup and won the finale at Vallelunga to end the year third overall. In parallel, Middleton also raced in the GT4 class of the British GT Championship for Raceway Motorsport, sharing a Ginetta G56 GT4 with Freddie Tomlinson, son of Ginetta chairman Lawrence Tomlinson. The pair finished 10th in points with a lone win at Snetterton. In 2024, Middleton made sporadic appearances in the series in Ginetta machinery for Team CMR and DTO Motorsport, most notably qualifying on pole at the first Donington Park enduro for the latter.

== Karting record ==
=== Karting career summary ===
Season	Series	Team	Position
2012	Trent Valley Kart Club — Rotax Junior		5th
2013	Kartmasters British GP — Rotax Junior		
2014	Super One Series — Rotax Senior		20th
2014	Kartmasters British GP — Rotax Junior		
2015	Kartmasters British GP — Rotax Senior		
2016	ABkC British Open Championship — Rotax Senior		10th

== Racing record ==
=== Racing career summary ===
Season	Series	Team	Races	Wins	Poles	F/Laps	Podiums	Points	Position
2015	Ginetta Junior Championship	Douglas Motorsport	20	0	1	2	3	283	7th
2015	Ginetta Junior Winter Series	Douglas Motorsport	4	3	0	1	3		**1st**
2016	Ginetta Junior Championship	Douglas Motorsport	25	7	2	7	14	575	**2nd**
2017	British GT Championship – GT4	HHC Motorsport	10	2	2	1	7	185	**1st**
2018	IMSA SportsCar Championship – Prototype	Whelen Engineering Racing	1	0	0	0	1	32	45th
2018	GT4 European Series – Silver	HHC Motorsport	12	2	5	2	5	143	**2nd**
2019	Lamborghini Super Trofeo Europe – Pro	Bonaldi Motorsport	12	3	0	0	8	125	**3rd**
2019	Lamborghini Super Trofeo World Finals – Pro	Bonaldi Motorsport	2	0	0	0	0	6	8th
2020	Lamborghini Super Trofeo North America – Pro	Prestige Performance/Wayne Taylor Racing	10	0	0	0	6	78	4th
2021	Italian GT Championship Endurance Cup – GT3	Imperiale Racing	4	1	0	0	3	47	**2nd**
2021	Italian GT Championship Sprint Cup – GT3 Pro-Am	Imperiale Racing	4	0	0	0	1	30	NC
2022	Italian GT Championship Sprint Cup – GT3	Imperiale Racing	8	2	0	0	2	56	6th
2023	British GT Championship – GT4	Raceway Motorsport	9	1	0	0	1	47	10th
2023	Italian GT Championship Endurance Cup – GT3	Imperiale Racing	4	1	0	0	2	39	**3rd**
2024	British GT Championship – GT4	Team CMR	1	0	0	0	0	15	20th
2024	British GT Championship – GT4	DTO Motorsport	2	0	1	0	0	15	20th

=== Complete Ginetta Junior Championship results ===
(key) (Races in bold indicate pole position) (Races in italics indicate fastest lap)

Year	Team	1	2	3	4	5	6	7	8	9	10	11	12	13	14	15	16	17	18	19	20	21	22	23	24	25	Pos	Points
2015	Douglas Motorsport	BHI; 1; 4	BHI; 2; 15	DON; 1; 10	DON; 2; 17	**THR**; **1**; 3	THR; 2; 4	OUL; 1; 10	OUL; 2; 8	CRO; 1; 7	CRO; 2; 5	SNE; 1 Ret	SNE; 2; 15	KNO; 1 Ret	KNO; 2; 7	ROC; 1; 2	ROC; 2; 2	SIL; 1; 10	SIL; 2; 5	BHGP; 1; 5	BHGP; 2; 20						7th	283
2016	Douglas Motorsport	**BHI**; **1**; 2	BHI; 2; 1	DON; 1; 2	DON; 2; 1	DON; 3; 7	THR; 1; 1	**THR**; **2**; 7	OUL; 1; 3	OUL; 2; 2	**CRO**; **1**; 1	**CRO**; **2**; 1	CRO; 3 Ret	SNE; 1; 9	SNE; 2; 7	KNO; 1; 2	KNO; 2; 9	KNO; 3; 4	ROC; 1; 1	**ROC**; **2**; 2	ROC; 3; 10	SIL; 1; 11	SIL; 2; 18	SIL; 3; 5	BHGP; 1; 1	**BHGP**; **2**; 3	2nd	575

=== Complete British GT Championship results ===
(key) (Races in bold indicate pole position in class) (Races in italics indicate fastest lap in class)

Year	Entrant	Chassis	Class	1	2	3	4	5	6	7	8	9	10	DC	Pts
2017	HHC Motorsport	Ginetta G55 GT4	GT4	OUL; 1; 12	OUL; 2; 11	**ROC**; 11	SNE; 1; 11	SNE; 2 Ret	**SIL**; NC	**SPA**; **1**; 16	SPA; 2; 12	BRH; 12	DON; 8	1st	185
2023	Raceway Motorsport	Ginetta G56 GT4	GT4	OUL; 1; 29	OUL; 2; 25	SIL; DSQ	DON; 21	SNE; 1; 20	SNE; 2 Ret	ALG; 22	BRH; 20	DON; 26		10th	47
2024	Team CMR	Ginetta G56 GT4 Evo	GT4	OUL; 1	OUL; 2	SIL; 27								20th	15
2024	DTO Motorsport	Ginetta G56 GT4 Evo	GT4				**DON1**; 32	SPA; 19	SNE; 1	SNE; 2	DON2	BRH		20th	15

=== Complete IMSA SportsCar Championship results ===
Year	Entrant	Class	Engine	Chassis	1	2	3	4	5	6	7	8	9	10	Rank	Points
2018	Whelen Engineering Racing	P	Cadillac DPi-V.R	Cadillac 5.5 L V8	DAY; 2	SEB	LBH	MDO	DET	WGL	MOS	ELK	LGA	PET	45th	32

=== Complete GT4 European Series results ===
(key) (Races in bold indicate pole position) (Races in italics indicate fastest lap)

Year	Team	Car	Class	1	2	3	4	5	6	7	8	9	10	11	12	Pos	Points
2018	HHC Motorsport	Ginetta G55 GT4	Silver	ZOL; 1; 2	**ZOL**; **2**; 1	**BRH**; **1**; 15	**BRH**; **2**; 1	MIS; 1; 2	MIS; 2; 5	**SPA**; **1**; 4	SPA; 2; 2	HUN; 1 Ret	HUN; 2; 10	**NÜR**; **1**; 4	NÜR; 2 Ret	2nd	143
