= Will Tregurtha =

British racing driver (born 2000)

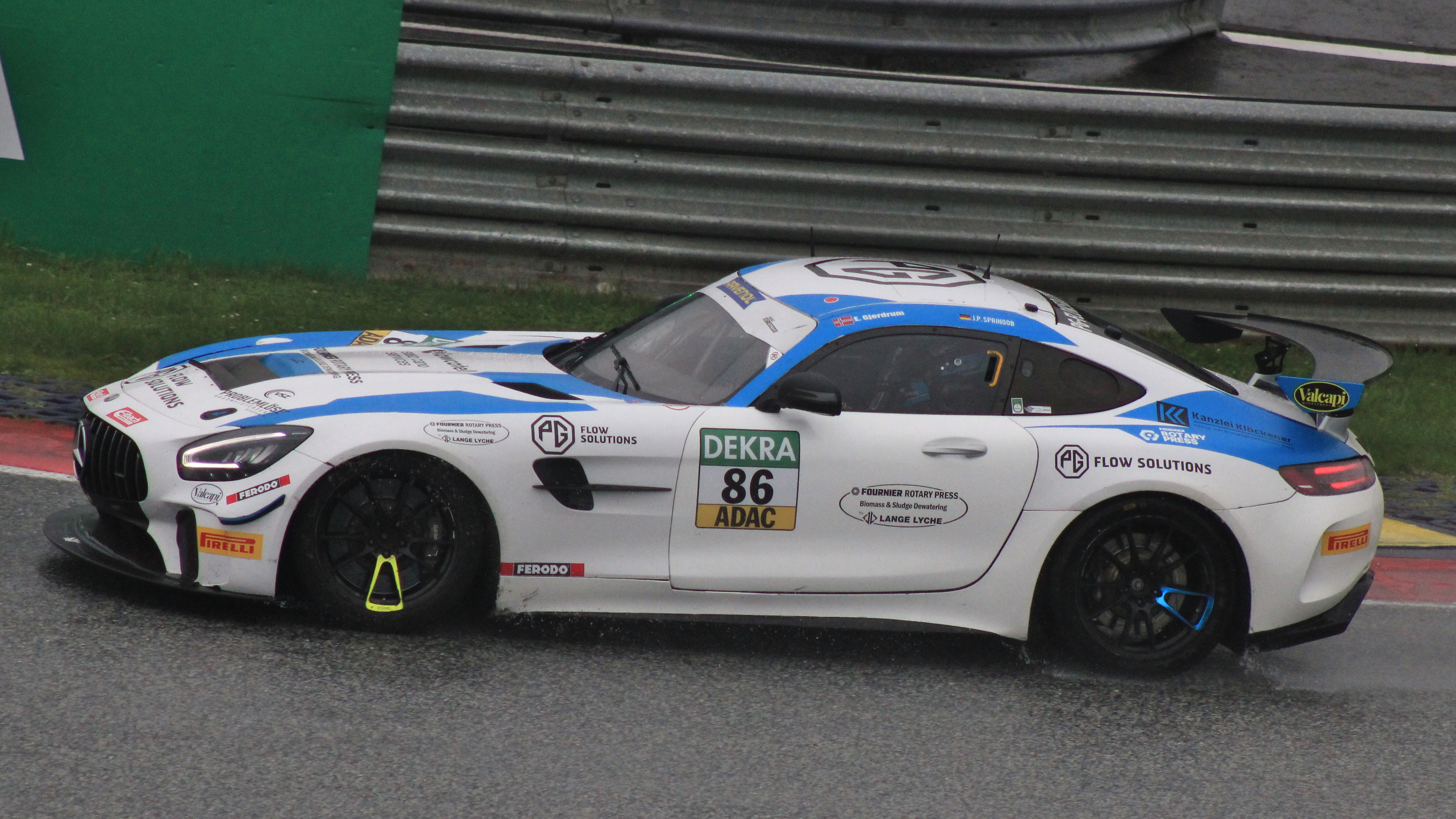
- Tregurtha in 2024
- Nationality: (United Kingdom) British
- Born: 1 April 2000 (age 26) Milton Keynes, England

Lamborghini Super Trofeo Asia career
- Debut season: 2026
- Current team: Batmobile Racing
- Categorisation: FIA Silver
- Car number: 3
- Starts: 12
- Wins: 6
- Podiums: 11
- Poles: 7
- Fastest laps: 6
- Best finish: 1st (Pro) in 2026

Previous series
- 2017, 2022–2023 2020, 2022, 2024 2018, 2022 2021 2019 2015–2016: British GT Championship; ADAC GT4 Germany; GT4 European Series; DTM Trophy; ADAC GT Masters; Ginetta Junior Championship

Championship titles
- 2026 2023 2017 2017 2016: Lamborghini Super Trofeo Asia – Pro; British GT – GT3 Silver-Am; British GT – GT4 Silver; British GT – GT4; Ginetta Junior Championship

William Robert Francis Tregurtha (born 1 April 2000) is a British racing driver and sim racer who last competed in Lamborghini Super Trofeo Asia for Batmobile Racing.

Tregurtha won the 2016 Ginetta Junior Championship and is a two-time British GT Championship champion in GT4 and GT3 Silver-Am. He has also finished runner-up in the GT4 European Series and DTM Trophy.

== Racing career ==
Tregurtha began his racing career in 2015, driving for Richardson Chassis Engineering in the Ginetta Junior Championship. In his rookie season in the series, Tregurtha scored a best result of fourth at Snetterton to end the year 12th in points. At the end of the year, Tregurtha joined HHC Motorsport to compete in the Ginetta Junior Winter Series, scoring one podium in the four-race series to take eighth overall. Remaining with HHC for the main season in 2016, Tregurtha won the season opener at Brands Hatch and both races at Oulton Park, before taking further wins at Croft, Knockhill and Rockingham to clinch the title with a round to spare.

In 2017, Tregurtha joined forces with title rival Stuart Middleton to step up to the GT4 class of the British GT Championship with HHC in a Ginetta G55 GT4. In their first season in the series, the pair scored overall GT4 wins at Rockingham and Snetterton, and took five other podiums to clinch the overall and Silver Cup titles. In early 2018, Tregurtha raced for Ginetta Australia in the C class of the Bathurst 12 Hour. Remaining in Ginetta machinery for the rest of the year, Tregurtha returned to HHC Motorsport to enter the GT4 European Series alongside Middleton. In his only season in the series, Tregurtha won at Zolder and Brands Hatch, as well as taking four other podiums to clinch runner-up honours in the Silver Cup on countback, as the top three all finished level on points.

Moving to Germany for 2019, Tregurtha dabbled across three classes in his maiden venture in the VLN Series, as well as making his debut at the 24 Hours of Nürburgring and competing in the last five rounds of ADAC GT Masters for T3 Motorsport, sharing an Audi R8 LMS Evo with Maximilian Paul. In 2020, Tregurtha remained with the team to contest all but one round of ADAC GT4 Germany alongside Hugo Sasse. They finished second at the Lausitzring and took a pair of third-place finishes at the Sachsenring and Oschersleben to end the year ninth overall. Continuing in GT4 machinery for 2021, Tregurtha moved to AMG-fielding CV Performance Group to race solo in DTM Trophy. In the seven-round series, Tregurtha won at the Lausitzring and the Red Bull Ring, and secured six other podiums to finish runner-up to Ben Green.

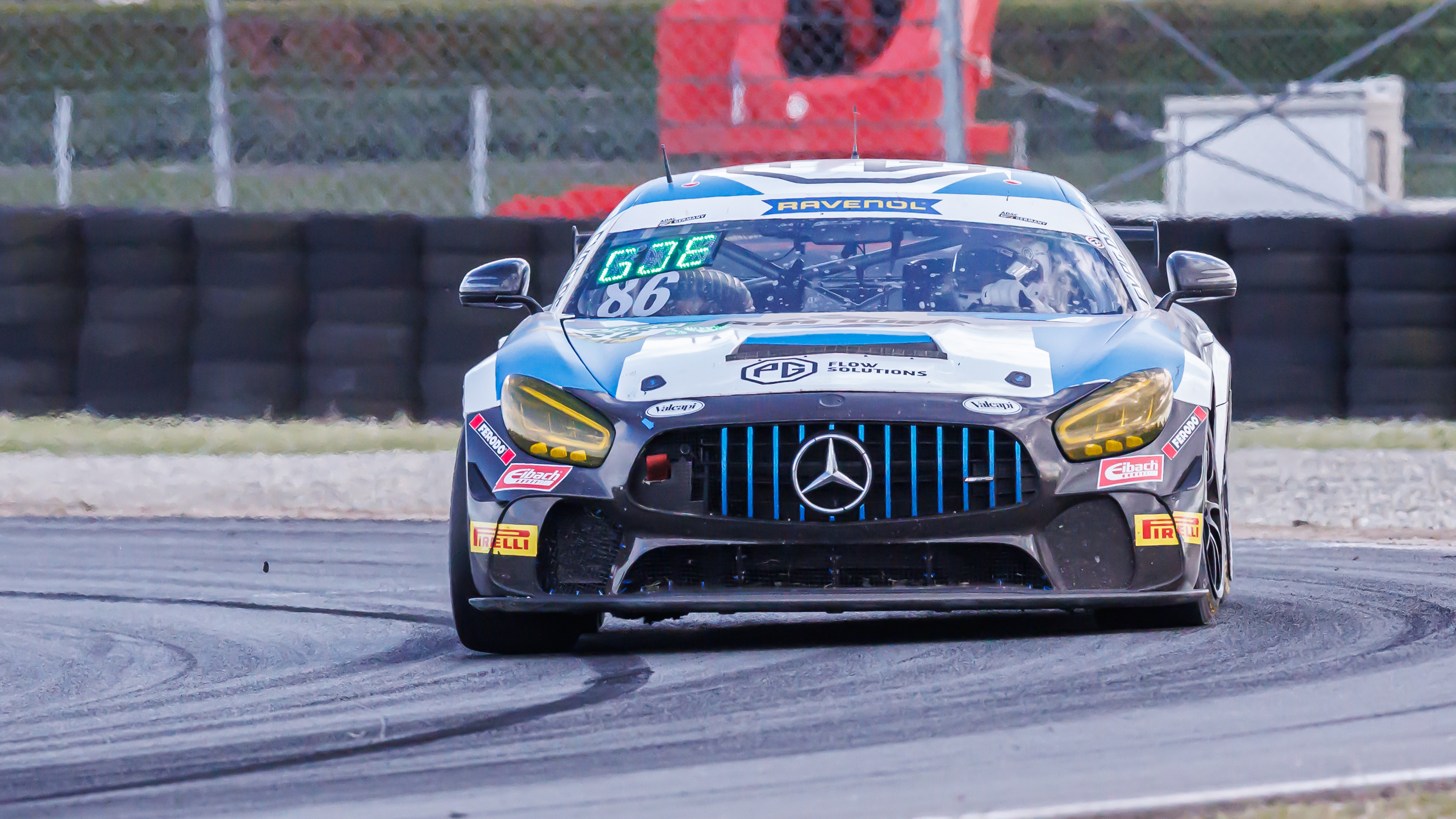
Tregurtha's CV Performance Mercedes-AMG GT4 in at Oschersleben in 2024.

Returning to GT3 competition in 2022, Tregurtha joined Bentley-affiliated Assetto Motorsport in the British GT Championship. After six races, Tregurtha left the team to make a brief return to ADAC GT4 Germany, scoring a podium in each of the final two rounds for CV Performance Group and Racing One respectively. Tregurtha then returned to British GT to drive a Lamborghini Huracán GT3 Evo 2 for Barwell Motorsport in 2023, scoring three Silver-Am wins to clinch the class title alongside Mark Sansom. A quiet campaign in ADAC GT4 Germany for CV Performance Group then ensued in 2024, before Tregurtha moved to Triple M Motorsport and the GT Cup Championship for 2025.

In 2026, Tregurtha joined Batmobile Racing to compete in Lamborghini Super Trofeo Asia. After winning the Sepang opener, Tregurtha won the next five races to extend his points lead, as Jonathan Cecotto joined him as co-driver. Following that, Tregurtha scored four podiums in the final five races to clinch the Pro title by three points at the Monza finale.

== Esports career ==
Alongside his racing career, Tregurtha is a professional sim racer, primarily on iRacing. As a member of Apex Racing in 2016, Tregurtha credited iRacing as a contributor to his championship-winning season in the Ginetta Junior Championship. Tregurtha then bounced around teams, most notably winning the 2021 Apex Technologies LMP2 Championship for Mivano Corse, as well as competing for R-Motorsport in the 2020 SRO E-Sport GT Series on Assetto Corsa Competizione. In late 2021, Tregurtha joined Williams Esports as a Driver Performance Coach, whilst also competing in the team's Academy roster.

== Karting record ==
=== Karting career summary ===
Season	Series	Team	Position
2012	Trent Valley Kart Club — Mini Max		25th
2014	Rotax Max Wintercup – Junior Max	KR Sport	19th
2014	Super One Series – Rotax Junior		7th
2014	Kartmasters British GP – Rotax Junior		

== Racing record ==
=== Racing career summary ===
Season	Series	Team	Races	Wins	Poles	F/Laps	Podiums	Points	Position
2015	Ginetta Junior Championship	Richardson Chassis Engineering	18	0	0	0	0	187	12th
2015	Ginetta Junior Winter Series	HHC Motorsport	4	0	0	0	1	62	8th
2016	Ginetta Junior Championship	HHC Motorsport	23	6	3	3	13	615	**1st**
2017	British GT Championship – GT4	HHC Motorsport	10	2	2	1	7	185	**1st**
2018	Bathurst 12 Hour – C	Ginetta Australia	1	0	0	0	0	—N/a	DNF
2018	GT4 European Series – Silver	HHC Motorsport	12	2	5	2	5	143	**2nd**
2019	VLN Series – Cup 5	Walkenhorst Motorsport	3	0	0	0	0	12.38	38th
2019	VLN Series – V4	Krämer Racing	1	0	0	0	0	0	NC
2019	VLN Series – SP10	Walkenhorst Motorsport	2	0	0	0	2	11.43	20th
2019	ADAC GT Masters	T3 Motorsport	9	0	0	0	0	8	34th
2019	24 Hours of Nürburgring – Kl. Cup	Team Avia Sorg Rennsport	1	0	0	0	1	—N/a	**2nd**
2020	Nürburgring Langstrecken-Serie – Cup 5	Walkenhorst Motorsport	4	0	0	0	0	14.51	25th
2020	Nürburgring Langstrecken-Serie – V4		3	0	0	0	0	0	NC
2020	ADAC GT4 Germany	T3-HRT-Motorsport	10	0	0	0	3	93	9th
2020	GT Cup Championship – GT3	Tecserv UK	5	3	3	5	3	72‡	**2nd‡**
2020	GT Cup Championship – GTB	24/7 Motorsport	4	1	0	2	3	178.5‡	**3rd‡**
2021	Nürburgring Langstrecken-Serie – Cup 5	Purple Dot Racing with Walkenhorst	8	0	1	0	2		
2021	Nürburgring Langstrecken-Serie – SP8T	Walkenhorst Motorsport	1	0	0	0	0		
2021	DTM Trophy	CV Performance Group	14	2	3	4	8	237	**2nd**
2021	GT Cup Championship – GT3	Tecserv UK							
2022	GT Cup Championship – GT3	Tecserv UK	20	0	0	0	1		
2022	British GT Championship – GT3	Assetto Motorsport	6	0	0	0	0	30.5	20th
2022	Nürburgring Langstrecken-Serie – SP9 Pro-Am	racing one	1	0	0	0	0	0	NC
2022	GT4 European Series – Silver	Team Spirit Racing	2	0	0	0	0	2	23rd
2022	ADAC GT4 Germany	CV Performance Group	2	0	0	0	1	47	20th
2022	ADAC GT4 Germany	Racing One	2	0	0	0	1	47	20th
2023	British GT Championship – GT3	Barwell Motorsport	9	0	0	0	0	32	14th
2024	ADAC GT4 Germany	CV Performance Group	8	0	0	0	0	10	23rd
2025	GT Cup Championship – GTH	Triple M Motorsport						304‡	4th‡
2026	Lamborghini Super Trofeo Asia – Pro	Batmobile Racing	12	6	7	6	11	155	**1st**
2026	Lamborghini Super Trofeo World Finals – Pro	Batmobile Racing	2	0	0	0	0	3	12th

^{†} As Tregurtha was a guest driver, he was ineligible to score points.
^{‡} Team standings.

=== Complete Ginetta Junior Championship results ===
(key) (Races in bold indicate pole position) (Races in italics indicate fastest lap)

Year	Team	1	2	3	4	5	6	7	8	9	10	11	12	13	14	15	16	17	18	19	20	21	22	23	24	25	Pos	Points
2015	Richardson Chassis Engineering	BHI; 1; 14	BHI; 2; 6	DON; 1; 7	DON; 2; 7	THR; 1; 6	THR; 2; 13	OUL; 1; 11	OUL; 2; 10	CRO; 1; 18	CRO; 2; 11	SNE; 1; 9	SNE; 2; 4	KNO; 1; 10	KNO; 2; 19	ROC; 1 DNS	ROC; 2 DNS	SIL; 1; 14	SIL; 2; 17	BHGP; 1; 12	BHGP; 2; 12						12th	187
2016	HHC Motorsport	BHI; 1; 1	**BHI**; **2**; 5	DON; 1; 5	DON; 2; 4	DON; 3; 3	THR; 1; 2	THR; 2; 2	**OUL**; **1**; 1	**OUL**; **2**; 1	CRO; 1; 10	CRO; 2; 15	CRO; 3; 1	**SNE**; **1**; 3	SNE; 2; 2	KNO; 1; 5	KNO; 2; 4	KNO; 3; 1	**ROC**; **1**; 2	ROC; 2; 1	ROC; 3; 5	SIL; 1; 5	SIL; 2; 4	SIL; 3; 2	BHGP; 1	BHGP; 2	1st	615

=== Complete British GT Championship results ===
(key) (Races in bold indicate pole position in class) (Races in italics indicate fastest lap in class)

Year	Entrant	Chassis	Class	1	2	3	4	5	6	7	8	9	10	DC	Pts
2017	HHC Motorsport	Ginetta G55 GT4	GT4	OUL; 1; 12	OUL; 2; 11	**ROC**; 11	SNE; 1; 11	SNE; 2 Ret	**SIL**; NC	**SPA**; **1**; 16	SPA; 2; 12	BRH; 12	DON; 8	1st	185
2022	Assetto Motorsport	Bentley Continental GT3	GT3	OUL; 1; 7	OUL; 2; 25	SIL; 6	DON1; 17	SNE; 1; 13	SNE; 2; 10	SPA	BRH	DON2		20th	30.5
2023	Barwell Motorsport	Lamborghini Huracán GT3 Evo 2	GT3	OUL; 1; 14	OUL; 2; 16	SIL; 6	DON; 9	SNE; 1; 9	SNE; 2; 16	ALG; 8	BRH; 8	DON; 11		14th	32

=== Complete GT4 European Series results ===
(key) (Races in bold indicate pole position) (Races in italics indicate fastest lap)

Year	Team	Car	Class	1	2	3	4	5	6	7	8	9	10	11	12	Pos	Points
2018	HHC Motorsport	Ginetta G55 GT4	Silver	ZOL; 1; 2	**ZOL**; **2**; 1	**BRH**; **1**; 15	**BRH**; **2**; 1	MIS; 1; 2	MIS; 2; 5	**SPA**; **1**; 4	SPA; 2; 2	HUN; 1 Ret	HUN; 2; 10	**NÜR**; **1**; 4	NÜR; 2 Ret	2nd	143
2022	Team Spirit Racing	Aston Martin Vantage AMR GT4	Silver	IMO; 1	IMO; 2	LEC; 1	LEC; 2	MIS; 1	MIS; 2	SPA; 1	SPA; 2	HOC; 1; 16	HOC; 2; 19	CAT; 1	CAT; 2	23rd	2

=== Complete ADAC GT Masters results ===
(key) (Races in bold indicate pole position) (Races in italics indicate fastest lap)

Year	Team	Car	1	2	3	4	5	6	7	8	9	10	11	12	13	14	DC	Points
2019	T3 Motorsport	Audi R8 LMS Evo	OSC; 1	OSC; 2	MST; 1	MST; 2	RBR; 1; 19	RBR; 2 Ret	ZAN; 1; 22	ZAN; 2; 27	NÜR; 1; 24	NÜR; 2 Ret	HOC; 1; 8	HOC; 2; 25	SAC; 1 DNS	SAC; 2; 18	34th	8

=== Complete ADAC GT4 Germany results ===
(key) (Races in bold indicate pole position) (Races in italics indicate fastest lap)

Year	Team	Car	1	2	3	4	5	6	7	8	9	10	11	12	Pos	Points
2020	T3-HRT-Motorsport	Audi R8 LMS GT4 Evo	NÜR; 1	NÜR; 2	HOC; 1; 17	HOC; 2; 5	SAC; 1; 4	SAC; 2; 3	RBR; 1; 9	RBR; 2; 18	LAU; 1 Ret	LAU; 2; 2	OSC; 1; 8	OSC; 2; 3	9th	93
2022	CV Performance Group	Mercedes-AMG GT4	OSC; 1	OSC; 2	RBR; 1	RBR; 2	ZAN; 1	ZAN; 2	NÜR; 1	NÜR; 2	SAC; 1; 2	SAC; 2; 11			20th	47
2022	Racing One	Aston Martin Vantage AMR GT4											HOC; 1; 10	HOC; 2; 3	20th	47
2024	CV Performance Group	Mercedes-AMG GT4	OSC; 1; 18	OSC; 2; 20	LAU; 1 Ret	LAU; 2 Ret	NOR; 1; 15	NOR; 2; 9	NÜR; 1; 18	NÜR; 2; 14	RBR; 1	RBR; 2	HOC; 1	HOC; 2	23rd	10
