= DTM Trophy =

Car Racing Trophy

- Category: Sports car racing
- Country: Europe (Germany 40% and rest of European countries 60% (2020))
- Inaugural season: 2020
- Folded: 2023
- Constructors: Audi, BMW, Mercedes-Benz, Porsche, Toyota and others
- Tyre suppliers: Hankook
- Last Drivers' champion: Tim Heinemann (Toyota Gazoo Racing Germany powered by Ring Racing)
- Official website: dtm.com/en/dtm-trophy

The DTM Trophy was a sports car racing series sanctioned by ITR e.V. which had been affiliated with the DMSB-FIA since 1984. The series was based in Germany, with rounds across Europe, featuring mass-produced GT4 racing cars since 2020.

DTM Trophy was effectively a support series for Deutsche Tourenwagen Masters for GT cars eligible for E2-SH and E2-SC-class FIA categories.

== History ==
On 20 October 2019 it was announced that the ITR e.V. sanctioning body would create the GT4-based sports car racing series as the replacement of proposed Formula European Masters which was cancelled due to lack of entries, with plans to debut in 2020 after following the merger of GP3 Series and FIA Formula 3 European Championship to create FIA Formula 3 Championship. On the same date ITR e.V. announced that DTM Trophy would be introduced and thus would be scheduled to debut from 2020 season onwards. The series folded following the 2022 season after ADAC acquired the rights of the parent series and decided to continue running the ADAC GT4 Germany as its only GT4-series.

== Cars ==
DTM Trophy cars utilized GT4-based mass-produced sports cars starting from the 2020 season.

=== Tyres ===
On 30 December 2019 it was announced that South Korean tyre manufacturer Hankook would be selected as official tyre partner beginning from 2020 until at least 2023 season.

== Manufacturer representation ==
- Aston Martin Vantage AMR GT4 (2021–2022)
- Audi R8 LMS GT4 Evo (2020–2022)
- BMW M4 GT4 (2020–2022)
- Mercedes-AMG GT4 (2020–2022)
- Porsche 718 Cayman GT4 Clubsport (2020, 2022)
- Porsche Cayman PRO4 GT4 (2020–2021)
- KTM X-Bow GT4 (2020–2021)
- Toyota GR Supra GT4 (2020–2022)

== Race format ==
=== Scoring system ===
Points were awarded to the top ten classified finishers as follows:

Race Position	1st	2nd	3rd	4th	5th	6th	7th	8th	9th	10th
Points	25	18	15	12	10	8	6	4	2	1

Additionally, the top three placed drivers in qualifying also received points:

Qualifying Position	1st	2nd	3rd
Points	3	2	1

In the case of a tie, DTM Trophy determined the champion based on the most first-place finishes. If the tie persisted, the champion was decided by the most second-place finishes, then the most third-place finishes, and so on, until a champion was determined. This system was also applied to other ties in the rankings at the close of the season or any other time during the season.

== Seasons ==
Season	Champion	Team	Champion's Car
2020	(Germany) Tim Heinemann	(Austria) HP Racing International	(Germany) Mercedes-Benz
2021	(United Kingdom) Ben Green	(Germany) FK Performance Motorsport	(Germany) BMW
2022	(Germany) Tim Heinemann	Toyota Gazoo Racing Germany powered by Ring Racing	(Japan) Toyota
