= 2026 Lamborghini Super Trofeo =

The 2026 Lamborghini Super Trofeo includes:

- 2026 Lamborghini Super Trofeo Asia
- 2026 Lamborghini Super Trofeo Europe
- 2026 Lamborghini Super Trofeo North America
