= Ben Tuck =

British racing driver (born 1997)

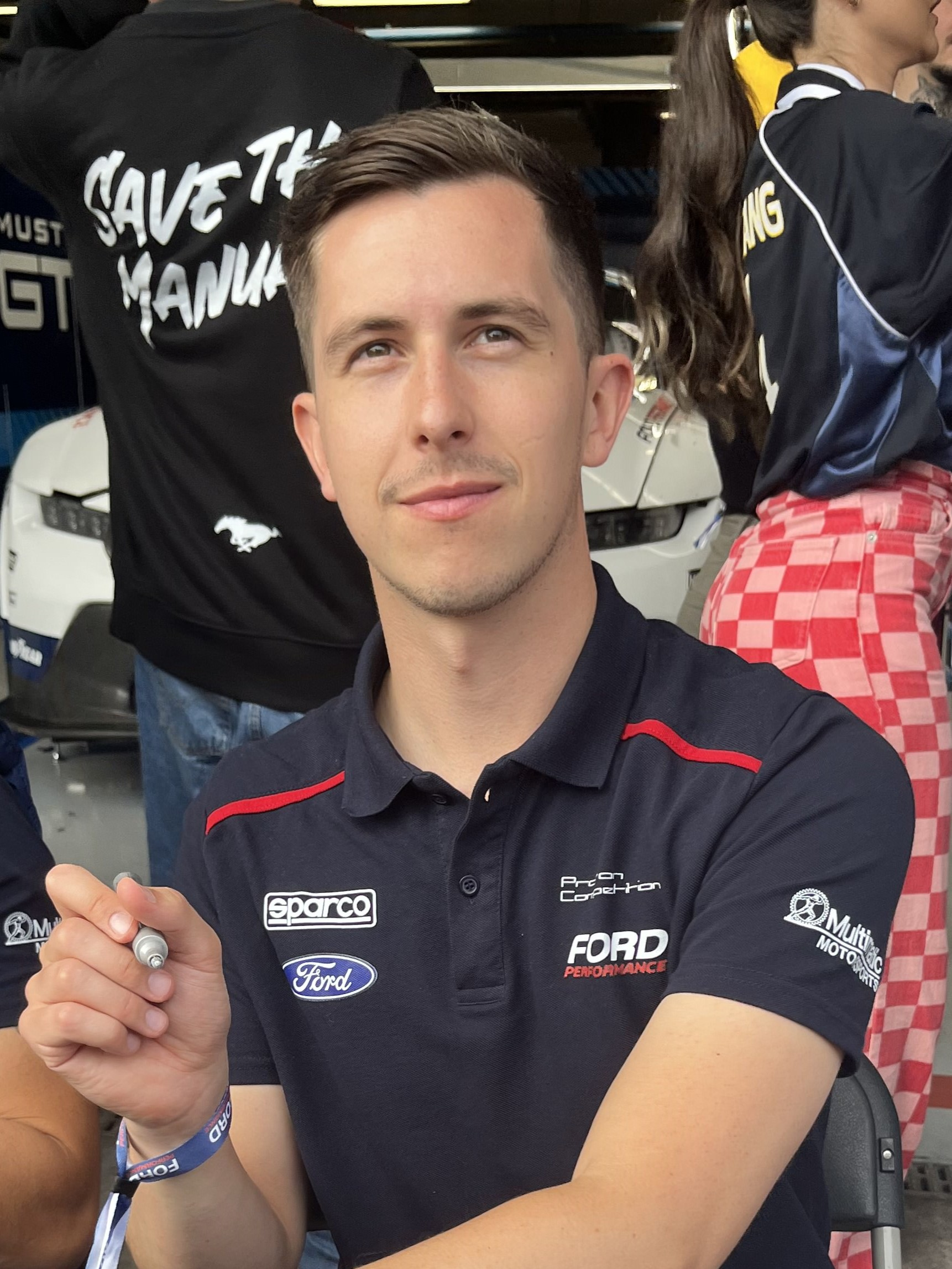
- Tuck at the 2025 6 Hours of São Paulo
- Nationality: (United Kingdom) British
- Born: Ben William Matthew Robert Tuck; 3 March 1997 (age 29) Sandy, Bedfordshire, England

FIA World Endurance Championship career
- Debut season: 2025
- Current team: Proton Competition
- Categorisation: FIA Silver (until 2026); FIA Gold (2027–)
- Car number: 77
- Starts: 8
- Best finish: 14th in 2025

Previous series
- 2023–2025: European Le Mans Series

Championship titles
- 2017: 24H Proto Series – P2

Ben William Matthew Robert Tuck (born 3 March 1997 in Sandy) is a British racing driver who last competed for Proton Competition in the LMGT3 class of the FIA World Endurance Championship.

A two-time Dubai 24 Hour winner, Tuck is managed by sports car racing legend Oliver Gavin.

== Early career ==
Tuck raced in karts from 2009 to 2012, mainly competing in Rotax competitions in England.

Stepping up to car racing in 2014, Tuck raced in the BRSCC Mazda MX-5 for two years, before moving to the Caterham Supersport Championship, where his performances earned him a one-off appearance at the Pembrey round of the 2016 Swift Sport Rallycross Championship.

== GT career ==
Tuck made his full-time debut in the 2018 British GT Championship, codriving a BMW M4 GT4 with Ben Green for Century Motorsport. Scoring one overall win in GT4 at Snetterton, he ended the season second overall in GT4, one point behind Jack Mitchell. At the end of the year, Tuck entered the BMW Motorsport junior selection process, eventually falling short against Erik Johansson in the final four.

Following a 2019 season largely spent in the Nürburgring-based VLN Series, Tuck remained with Walkenhorst Motorsport to compete in the inaugural season of the DTM Trophy. At the first round of the season at Spa, Tuck qualified on pole and won the series' first-ever race. Over the rest of the season, Tuck scored four more podiums to end the year third in the standings. In 2021, Tuck mainly competed in the Nürburgring Langstrecken-Serie again for Walkenhorst. In six races contested in the SP9 class, Tuck won the sixth race of the season, which would turn out to be his only podium of the season.

Tuck returned to full-time racing in 2023, joining TF Sport to compete in the LMGT3 class of the European Le Mans Series, aboard an Aston Martin Vantage AMR. At the second round of the season at Le Castellet, Tuck finished third, scoring his only podium of the season. In the winter of 2023, Tuck returned to TF Sport to compete in the 2023–24 Asian Le Mans Series. Tuck scored a lone podium at the finale in Yas Marina and finished 11th in points.

Tuck stayed in the newly restyled LMGT3 class, but switched to JMW Motorsport for his second season in the European Le Mans Series, now driving a Ferrari 296 GT3. As the only full-time driver for JMW throughout the season, Tuck scored a best result of sixth at Mugello. During 2024, Tuck also raced in the 24 Hours of Le Mans for Proton Competition, sharing a Ford Mustang GT3 with factory driver Christopher Mies and John Hartshorne. On his first race at the French enduro he finished 4th in class. At the end of the year, Tuck joined Ferrari customer Kessel Racing to race in the 2024–25 Asian Le Mans Series alongside Dennis Marschall and Dustin Blattner. The Briton took his first podium of the season in race one at Dubai by finishing third, and ended the season with another third-place finish at the season-ending Yas Marina round.

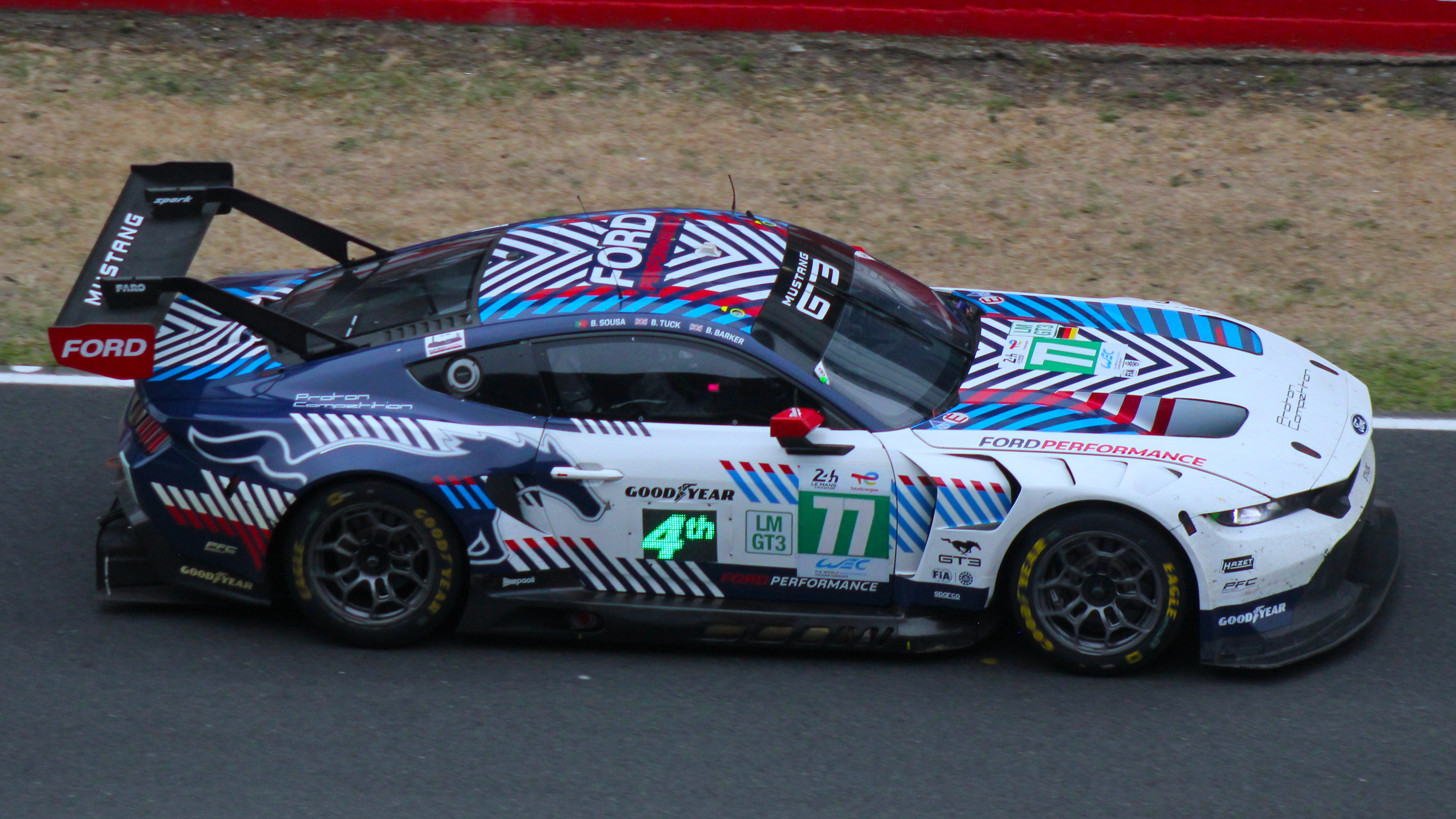
Tuck competed in the 2025 24 Hours of Le Mans for Proton Competition, finishing ninth in the race.

In early 2025, Tuck returned to Proton Competition in LMGT3 to compete in his first season in the FIA World Endurance Championship with the Ford Mustang. Tuck also returned to the European Le Mans Series, joining Kessel Racing alongside Takeshi Kimura and Daniel Serra in the team's Ferrari 296. In addition to his WEC and ELMS commitments, Tuck won the Dubai 24 Hour for WRT in the BMW M4 GT3 Evo's race debut, and later joined the team in the GT World Challenge Europe Endurance Cup alongside Jens Klingmann and Al Faisal Al Zubair. In the former, Tuck scored a best result of fourth at Spa to end the year 14th in the LMGT3 standings, while in ELMS, Tuck scored two podiums with a best result of second at Barcelona en route to a fifth-place finish. In GTWC, Tuck scored two Gold Cup class wins and three more podiums, including an overall second-place finish at Barcelona to secure runner-up honors in class. During 2025, Tuck also made select starts in the GTD class of the IMSA SportsCar Championship for Conquest Racing, in which he most notably finished third at Indianapolis, before ending the year by finishing second at the Gulf 12 Hours.

Tuck returned to Proton Competition in 2026 for his sophomore year in the LMGT3 class of the FIA World Endurance Championship. In his second full season in the WEC, Tuck qualified on pole at Fuji and took a best race result of fifth at Circuit of the Americas fo finish 23rd in points. In early 2026, Tuck won the Dubai 24 Hour for Team WRT, before winning the 24 Hours of Spa in the Bronze class for Ferrari-affiliated Kessel Racing, and later taking a GT Open podium for Al Manar by Dragon Racing at Le Castellet.

== Racing record ==
=== Racing career summary ===
Season	Series	Team	Races	Wins	Poles	F/Laps	Podiums	Points	Position
2014	BRSCC Mazda MX-5 Championship	AB Motorsport	10	0	0	0	0	700	25th
2015	BRSCC Mazda MX-5 Championship	AB Motorsport	19	2	3	3	7	1517	**3rd**
2015	Race of Remembrance – Class A	MX-5 Owners Club	1	0	0	0	0	—N/a	8th
2016	Caterham Supersport Championship	PT Motorsport	14	2	0	2	5	240	6th
2017	Caterham Supersport Championship	PT Motorsport	8	0	0	0	3	0	NC
2017	GT Cup UK – GTA	PT Motorsport	2	1	0	0	2	0	NC
2017	24H Proto Series – P2	Simpson Motorsport	2	??	??	??	??	68	**1st**
2017	British GT Championship – GT3	Century Motorsport	1	0	0	0	0	0	24th
2018	British GT Championship – GT4	Century Motorsport	9	1	2	0	2	123	**2nd**
2019	VLN Series – Cup 5	Walkenhorst Motorsport	3	0	0	0	0	6.67	58th
2019	VLN Series – SP10	Walkenhorst Motorsport	6	0	0	0	3	23.69	6th
2019	24 Hours of Nürburgring – BMW M240i Cup	FK Performance Motorsport	1	0	0	0	1	—N/a	**3rd**
2020	DTM Trophy	Walkenhorst Motorsport	12	1	1	0	4	133	**3rd**
2020	Nürburgring Langstrecken-Serie – SP10	Walkenhorst Motorsport	3	0	0	0	0	6.26	18th
2020	Nürburgring Langstrecken-Serie – SP8T	Walkenhorst Motorsport	1	0	0	0	0	2.14	23rd
2020	24 Hours of Nürburgring – SP8T	Walkenhorst Motorsport	1	0	0	0	0	—N/a	4th
2020	British GT Championship – GT4	Century Motorsport	2	0	0	0	0	14	16th
2021	Nürburgring Langstrecken-Serie – SP9 Pro-Am	Walkenhorst Motorsport	6	1	0	0	1	0	NC
2021	Nürburgring Langstrecken-Serie – Cup 5	Walkenhorst Motorsport	1	0	0	0	0	0	NC
2021	24 Hours of Nürburgring – SP9	Walkenhorst Motorsport	1	0	0	0	0	—N/a	11th
2021	DTM Trophy	Walkenhorst Motorsport	2	0	0	0	0	2	22nd
2022	Nürburgring Langstrecken-Serie – SP9 Pro	Walkenhorst Motorsport	1	0	0	0	0	0	NC
2022	24 Hours of Nürburgring – SP9 Pro-Am	Walkenhorst Motorsport	1	0	0	0	0	—N/a	7th
2023	European Le Mans Series – LMGTE	TF Sport	6	0	0	0	1	28	9th
2023	GT World Challenge America – Pro-Am	TRG-AMR	1	0	0	0	0	0	NC
2023–24	Asian Le Mans Series – GT	TF Sport	5	0	0	0	1	26	11th
2024	European Le Mans Series – LMGT3	JMW Motorsport	6	0	0	0	0	11	14th
2024	GT World Challenge Europe Endurance Cup	Kessel Racing	3	0	0	0	0	0	NC
2024	GT World Challenge Europe Endurance Cup – Bronze	Kessel Racing	3	0	0	0	0	10	28th
2024	24 Hours of Le Mans – LMGT3	Proton Competition	1	0	0	0	0	—N/a	4th
2024–25	Asian Le Mans Series – GT	Kessel Racing	6	0	2	0	2	54	4th
2025	Middle East Trophy – GT3 Pro	AlManar Racing by Team WRT	1	1	0	0	1	0	NC
2025	GT World Challenge Europe Endurance Cup	AlManar Racing by Team WRT	5	0	0	0	1	31	10th
2025	GT World Challenge Europe Endurance Cup – Gold	AlManar Racing by Team WRT	5	2	0	0	4	108	**2nd**
2025	FIA World Endurance Championship – LMGT3	Proton Competition	8	0	0	0	0	39	14th
2025	European Le Mans Series – LMGT3	Kessel Racing	6	0	0	1	2	53	5th
2025	IMSA SportsCar Championship – GTD	Conquest Racing	2	0	0	0	1	554	43rd
2025	Gulf 12 Hours	AlManar by Dragon Racing	1	0	0	0	1	—N/a	**2nd**
2025–26	24H Series Middle East - GT3	Team WRT	1	1	0	0	1	60	NC
2026	FIA World Endurance Championship – LMGT3	Proton Competition	8	0	1	0	0	13	23rd
2026	GT World Challenge Europe Endurance Cup	Kessel Racing	1	0	0	0	0	13	20th
2026	GT World Challenge Europe Endurance Cup – Bronze	Kessel Racing	1	1	1	0	1	50	7th
2026	Intercontinental GT Challenge	Kessel Racing	1	0	0	0	0	2	29th
2026	International GT Open	Al Manar by Dragon Racing	2	0	0	0	1	18	19th
2026	Porsche Endurance Trophy Nürburgring Cup – Cup3	Schmickler Performance powered by Ravenol							

=== Complete European Le Mans Series results ===
(key) (Races in bold indicate pole position; results in italics indicate fastest lap)

Year	Entrant	Class	Chassis	Engine	1	2	3	4	5	6	Rank	Points
2023	TF Sport	LMGTE	Aston Martin Vantage AMR	Aston Martin 4.0 L Turbo V8	CAT; 9	LEC; 3	ARA; 11	SPA; 9	ALG; 10	ALG; 6	9th	28
2024	JMW Motorsport	LMGT3	Ferrari 296 GT3	Ferrari F163 3.0 L Turbo V6	CAT; Ret	LEC; 10	IMO; 10	SPA; Ret	MUG; 6	ALG; 10	14th	11
2025	Kessel Racing	LMGT3	Ferrari 296 GT3	Ferrari F163 3.0 L Turbo V6	CAT; 2	LEC; 9	IMO; Ret	SPA; 3	SIL; 4	ALG; 7	5th	53

^{*} Season still in progress.

=== Complete Asian Le Mans Series results ===
(key) (Races in bold indicate pole position) (Races in italics indicate fastest lap)

Year	Team	Class	Car	Engine	1	2	3	4	5	6	Pos.	Points
2023–24	TF Sport	GT	Aston Martin Vantage AMR GT3	Aston Martin M177 4.0 L Turbo V8	SEP; 1; 15	SEP; 2; 9	DUB; 10	ABU; 1; 6	ABU; 2; 3		11th	26
2024–25	Kessel Racing	GT	Ferrari 296 GT3	Ferrari F163 3.0 L Turbo V6	SEP; 1; 6	SEP; 2; 12	**DUB**; **1**; 3	**DUB**; **2**; 10	ABU; 1; 4	ABU; 2; 3	4th	54

=== Complete GT World Challenge Europe results ===
==== GT World Challenge Europe Endurance Cup ====
(key) (Races in bold indicate pole position) (Races in italics indicate fastest lap)

Year	Team	Car	Class	1	2	3	4	5	6	7	Pos.	Points
2024	Kessel Racing	Ferrari 296 GT3	Bronze	LEC; 26	SPA; 6H; 54	SPA; 12H; 49	SPA; 24H; 45†	NÜR	MNZ; Ret	JED	28th	10
2025	AlManar Racing by WRT	BMW M4 GT3 Evo	Gold	LEC; 10	MNZ; 4	SPA; 6H; 17	SPA; 12H; 21	SPA; 24H; 20	NÜR; 12	BAR; 2	2nd	108
2026	Kessel Racing	Ferrari 296 GT3 Evo	Bronze	LEC	MNZ	SPA; 6H; 14	SPA; 12H; 1	**SPA**; **24H**; 10	NÜR	ALG	7th	50

=== Complete 24 Hours of Le Mans results ===
Year	Team	Co-Drivers	Car	Class	Laps	Pos.	Class Pos.
2024	(Germany) Proton Competition	(United Kingdom) John Hartshorne (Germany) Christopher Mies	Ford Mustang GT3	LMGT3	280	31st	4th
2025	(Germany) Proton Competition	(United Kingdom) Ben Barker (Portugal) Bernardo Sousa	Ford Mustang GT3	LMGT3	338	41st	9th
2026	(Germany) Proton Competition	(United States) Eric Powell (United Kingdom) Sebastian Priaulx	Ford Mustang GT3 Evo	LMGT3	244	DNF	DNF

=== Complete FIA World Endurance Championship results ===
(key) (Races in bold indicate pole position) (Races in italics indicate fastest lap)

Year	Entrant	Class	Car	Engine	1	2	3	4	5	6	7	8	Rank	Points
2025	Proton Competition	LMGT3	Ford Mustang GT3	Ford Coyote 5.4 L V8	QAT; Ret	IMO; 10	SPA; 4	LMS; 7	SÃO; Ret	COA; 6	FUJ; 12	BHR; 8	14th	39
2026	Proton Competition	LMGT3	Ford Mustang GT3 Evo	Ford Coyote 5.4 L V8	IMO; 10	SPA; 16	LMS; Ret	SÃO; 10	COA; 5	FUJ; 10	CAT; NC	MNZ; 12	23rd	13

=== Complete IMSA SportsCar Championship results ===
(key) (Races in bold indicate pole position; races in italics indicate fastest lap)

Year	Team	Class	Make	Engine	1	2	3	4	5	6	7	8	9	10	Rank	Points
2025	Conquest Racing	GTD	Ferrari 296 GT3	Ferrari F163CE 3.0 L Turbo V6	DAY	SEB	LBH	LGA	WGL; 10	MOS	ELK	VIR	IMS; 3	PET	43rd	554

^{*} Season still in progress.
