= 2017 British GT Championship =

Sports car racing season

The 2017 British GT Championship was the 25th British GT Championship, a sports car championship promoted by the Stéphane Ratel Organisation (SRO). The season began on 15 April at Oulton Park and finished on 24 September at Donington Park, after ten rounds held over seven meetings.

== Calendar ==
The calendar for the 2017 season was announced on 7 September 2016. The Spa round, originally planned as a 120-minute race, was modified to feature a pair of 60-minute races. All races except Belgian round at Spa, were held in the United Kingdom.

Round	Circuit	Length	Date
1	(United Kingdom) Oulton Park, Cheshire	60 min	17 April
2	(United Kingdom) Oulton Park, Cheshire	60 min	17 April
3	(United Kingdom) Rockingham Motor Speedway, Northamptonshire	120 min	30 April
4	(United Kingdom) Snetterton Circuit, Norfolk	60 min	28 May
5	(United Kingdom) Snetterton Circuit, Norfolk	60 min	28 May
6	(United Kingdom) Silverstone Circuit, Northamptonshire	180 min	11 June
7	Circuit de Spa-Francorchamps, Spa, Belgium	60 min	8 July
8	Circuit de Spa-Francorchamps, Spa, Belgium	60 min	8 July
9	(United Kingdom) Brands Hatch, Kent	120 min	6 August
10	(United Kingdom) Donington Park, Leicestershire	120 min	24 September

== Entry list ==
=== GT3 ===
Team	Car	Engine	No.	Drivers	Class	Rounds
(United Kingdom) JRM Racing	Nissan GT-R Nismo GT3 (2017)	Nissan VR38DETT 3.8L Turbo V6	08	(United Kingdom) Charlie Fagg	S	10
(United Kingdom) JRM Racing	Nissan GT-R Nismo GT3 (2017)	Nissan VR38DETT 3.8L Turbo V6	08	(United Kingdom) Ben Green	S	10
(United Kingdom) TF Sport	Aston Martin V12 Vantage GT3	Aston Martin 6.0L V12	1	(United Kingdom) Jonathan Adam	PA	All
(United Kingdom) TF Sport	Aston Martin V12 Vantage GT3	Aston Martin 6.0L V12	1	(United Kingdom) Derek Johnston	PA	All
(United Kingdom) TF Sport	Aston Martin V12 Vantage GT3	Aston Martin 6.0L V12	11	(United Kingdom) Jon Barnes	PA	All
(United Kingdom) TF Sport	Aston Martin V12 Vantage GT3	Aston Martin 6.0L V12	11	(United Kingdom) Mark Farmer	PA	All
(United Kingdom) Barwell Motorsport	Lamborghini Huracán GT3	Lamborghini 5.2L V10	6	(United Kingdom) Liam Griffin	PA	All
(United Kingdom) Barwell Motorsport	Lamborghini Huracán GT3	Lamborghini 5.2L V10	6	(United Kingdom) Sam Tordoff	PA	All
(United Kingdom) Barwell Motorsport	Lamborghini Huracán GT3	Lamborghini 5.2L V10	33	(United Kingdom) Phil Keen	PA	All
(United Kingdom) Barwell Motorsport	Lamborghini Huracán GT3	Lamborghini 5.2L V10	33	(United Kingdom) Jon Minshaw	PA	All
(United Kingdom) Barwell Motorsport	Lamborghini Huracán GT3	Lamborghini 5.2L V10	77	(Switzerland) Adrian Amstutz	PA	7–8
(United Kingdom) Barwell Motorsport	Lamborghini Huracán GT3	Lamborghini 5.2L V10	77	(Finland) Patrick Kujala	PA	7–8
(United Kingdom) Team Parker Racing	Bentley Continental GT3	Bentley 4.0L Turbo V8	7	(United Kingdom) Ian Loggie	PA	All
(United Kingdom) Team Parker Racing	Bentley Continental GT3	Bentley 4.0L Turbo V8	7	(United Kingdom) Callum MacLeod	PA	All
(United Kingdom) Team Parker Racing	Bentley Continental GT3	Bentley 4.0L Turbo V8	31	(United Kingdom) Seb Morris	PA	All
(United Kingdom) Team Parker Racing	Bentley Continental GT3	Bentley 4.0L Turbo V8	31	(United Kingdom) Rick Parfitt Jr.	PA	All
(Belgium) Team WRT	Audi R8 LMS	Audi 5.2L V10	17	(France) Alain Ferté	PA	7–8
(Belgium) Team WRT	Audi R8 LMS	Audi 5.2L V10	17	(United Kingdom) Stuart Leonard	PA	7–8
(United Kingdom) Century Motorsport	Ginetta G55 GT3	Chevrolet LS3 6.2L V8	19	(United Kingdom) Charlie Robertson	S	1–3, 6
(United Kingdom) Century Motorsport	Ginetta G55 GT3	Chevrolet LS3 6.2L V8	19	(United States) Parker Chase	S	1–3
(United Kingdom) Century Motorsport	Ginetta G55 GT3	Chevrolet LS3 6.2L V8	19	(Norway) Aleksander Schjerpen	S	6
(United Kingdom) Century Motorsport	Ginetta G55 GT3	Chevrolet LS3 6.2L V8	19	(United Kingdom) Tom Hibbert	S	9
(United Kingdom) Century Motorsport	Ginetta G55 GT3	Chevrolet LS3 6.2L V8	19	(United Kingdom) Ben Tuck	S	9
(United Kingdom) Century Motorsport	Ginetta G55 GT3	Chevrolet LS3 6.2L V8	69	(United Kingdom) Nathan Freke	S	1–3, 10
(United Kingdom) Century Motorsport	Ginetta G55 GT3	Chevrolet LS3 6.2L V8	69	(United States) Harry Gottsacker	S	1–3
(United Kingdom) Century Motorsport	Ginetta G55 GT3	Chevrolet LS3 6.2L V8	69	(United Kingdom) Ben Tuck	S	10
(Switzerland) Spirit of Race	Ferrari 488 GT3	Ferrari 3.9L Turbo V8	21	(United Kingdom) Duncan Cameron	PA	1–9
(Switzerland) Spirit of Race	Ferrari 488 GT3	Ferrari 3.9L Turbo V8	21	(Republic of Ireland) Matt Griffin	PA	1–9
(United Kingdom) Macmillan AMR	Aston Martin V12 Vantage GT3	Aston Martin 6.0L V12	24	(United Kingdom) James Littlejohn	S	1–9
(United Kingdom) Macmillan AMR	Aston Martin V12 Vantage GT3	Aston Martin 6.0L V12	24	(United Kingdom) Jack Mitchell	S	1–9
(United Kingdom) Mike Brown Racing	Aston Martin V12 Vantage GT3	Aston Martin 6.0L V12	26	(United Kingdom) Mike Brown	PA	9
(United Kingdom) Mike Brown Racing	Aston Martin V12 Vantage GT3	Aston Martin 6.0L V12	26	(United Kingdom) Matt Manderson	PA	9
(United Kingdom) AmDtuning.com	Mercedes-AMG GT3	Mercedes 6.2 L V8	30	(United Kingdom) Lee Mowle	PA	1–8
(United Kingdom) AmDtuning.com	Mercedes-AMG GT3	Mercedes 6.2 L V8	30	(United Kingdom) Ryan Ratcliffe	PA	1–8
(Thailand) Singha Plan-B Motorsport with Kessel Racing	Ferrari 488 GT3	Ferrari 3.9L Turbo V8	39	(Thailand) Piti Bhirombhakdi	PA	7–8
(Thailand) Singha Plan-B Motorsport with Kessel Racing	Ferrari 488 GT3	Ferrari 3.9L Turbo V8	39	(Netherlands) Carlo van Dam	PA	7–8
(Germany) Kornely Motorsport	Mercedes-AMG GT3	Mercedes 6.2 L V8	70	(Germany) Patrick Assenheimer	S	7–8
(Germany) Kornely Motorsport	Mercedes-AMG GT3	Mercedes 6.2 L V8	70	(Germany) Kenneth Heyer	S	7–8
(United Kingdom) Team ABBA with Rollcentre Racing	Mercedes-AMG GT3	Mercedes 6.2 L V8	88	(United Kingdom) Richard Neary	PA	All
(United Kingdom) Team ABBA with Rollcentre Racing	Mercedes-AMG GT3	Mercedes 6.2 L V8	88	(United Kingdom) Martin Short	PA	1–6
(United Kingdom) Team ABBA with Rollcentre Racing	Mercedes-AMG GT3	Mercedes 6.2 L V8	88	(United Kingdom) Adam Christodoulou	PA	6–10

Icon	Class
PA	Pro-Am Cup
S	Silver Cup

=== GT4 ===
Team	Car	Engine	No.	Drivers	Class	Rounds
(United Kingdom) In2Racing	McLaren 570S GT4	McLaren 3.8L Turbo V8	14	(United Kingdom) Gareth Howell	PA	1–3
(United Kingdom) In2Racing	McLaren 570S GT4	McLaren 3.8L Turbo V8	14	(United Kingdom) Richard Marsh	PA	1–3
(United Kingdom) In2Racing	McLaren 570S GT4	McLaren 3.8L Turbo V8	14	(Belgium) Jacques Duyver	PA	7–8
(United Kingdom) In2Racing	McLaren 570S GT4	McLaren 3.8L Turbo V8	14	(United Kingdom) Charlie Hollings	PA	7–8
(United Kingdom) In2Racing	McLaren 570S GT4	McLaren 3.8L Turbo V8	14	(United Kingdom) Will Goff	PA	9
(United Kingdom) In2Racing	McLaren 570S GT4	McLaren 3.8L Turbo V8	14	(United Kingdom) Daniel McKay	PA	9
(United Kingdom) In2Racing	McLaren 570S GT4	McLaren 3.8L Turbo V8	14	(United Kingdom) Matthew Graham	S	10
(United Kingdom) In2Racing	McLaren 570S GT4	McLaren 3.8L Turbo V8	14	(United Kingdom) William Phillips	S	10
(United Kingdom) In2Racing	McLaren 570S GT4	McLaren 3.8L Turbo V8	29	(United Kingdom) Marcus Hoggarth	PA	All
(United Kingdom) In2Racing	McLaren 570S GT4	McLaren 3.8L Turbo V8	29	(United Kingdom) Matthew Graham	PA	1–3, 6
(United Kingdom) In2Racing	McLaren 570S GT4	McLaren 3.8L Turbo V8	29	(United Kingdom) Euan McKay	PA	4–5
(United Kingdom) In2Racing	McLaren 570S GT4	McLaren 3.8L Turbo V8	29	(Finland) Jesse Anttila	PA	7–10
(United Kingdom) Autoaid/RCIB Insurance Racing	Ginetta G55 GT4	Ford Cyclone 3.7L V6	36	(United Kingdom) Michael Caine	PA	1–2
(United Kingdom) Autoaid/RCIB Insurance Racing	Ginetta G55 GT4	Ford Cyclone 3.7L V6	36	(United Kingdom) Mike Newbould	PA	1–2
(United Kingdom) Autoaid/RCIB Insurance Racing	Ginetta G55 GT4	Ford Cyclone 3.7L V6	36	(United Kingdom) Simon Rudd	S	3
(United Kingdom) Autoaid/RCIB Insurance Racing	Ginetta G55 GT4	Ford Cyclone 3.7L V6	36	(United Kingdom) Jordan Stilp	S	3
(United Kingdom) Autoaid/RCIB Insurance Racing	Ginetta G55 GT4	Ford Cyclone 3.7L V6	36	(United Kingdom) Michael Caine	S	4–5
(United Kingdom) Autoaid/RCIB Insurance Racing	Ginetta G55 GT4	Ford Cyclone 3.7L V6	36	(United Kingdom) Jake Giddings	S	4–5, 10
(United Kingdom) Autoaid/RCIB Insurance Racing	Ginetta G55 GT4	Ford Cyclone 3.7L V6	36	(United Kingdom) Adam Hatfield	S	7–9
(United Kingdom) Autoaid/RCIB Insurance Racing	Ginetta G55 GT4	Ford Cyclone 3.7L V6	36	(United Kingdom) Benjamin Wallace	S	7–9
(United Kingdom) Autoaid/RCIB Insurance Racing	Ginetta G55 GT4	Ford Cyclone 3.7L V6	36	(United Kingdom) Abbie Eaton	S	10
(United Kingdom) Autoaid/RCIB Insurance Racing	Ginetta G55 GT4	Ford Cyclone 3.7L V6	63	(United Kingdom) Matt Chapman	S	1–9
(United Kingdom) Autoaid/RCIB Insurance Racing	Ginetta G55 GT4	Ford Cyclone 3.7L V6	63	(United Kingdom) Sam Webster	S	1–6
(United Kingdom) Autoaid/RCIB Insurance Racing	Ginetta G55 GT4	Ford Cyclone 3.7L V6	63	(United Kingdom) Jake Giddings	S	7–8
(United Kingdom) Autoaid/RCIB Insurance Racing	Ginetta G55 GT4	Ford Cyclone 3.7L V6	63	(United Kingdom) Chris Milford	S	9–10
(United Kingdom) Autoaid/RCIB Insurance Racing	Ginetta G55 GT4	Ford Cyclone 3.7L V6	63	(United Kingdom) Adam Hatfield	S	10
(United Kingdom) Macmillan AMR	Aston Martin V8 Vantage GT4	Aston Martin 4.7L V8	42	(Denmark) Jan Jønck	S	1–9
(United Kingdom) Macmillan AMR	Aston Martin V8 Vantage GT4	Aston Martin 4.7L V8	42	(United Kingdom) William Phillips	S	1–9
(United Kingdom) Century Motorsport	Ginetta G55 GT4	Ford Cyclone 3.7L V6	43	(United Kingdom) Steve Fresle	PA	1–8
(United Kingdom) Century Motorsport	Ginetta G55 GT4	Ford Cyclone 3.7L V6	43	(Denmark) Jacob Mathiassen	PA	1–8
(United Kingdom) Century Motorsport	Ginetta G55 GT4	Ford Cyclone 3.7L V6	43	(Denmark) Jacob Mathiassen	S	9–10
(United Kingdom) Century Motorsport	Ginetta G55 GT4	Ford Cyclone 3.7L V6	43	(Republic of Ireland) Niall Murray	S	9–10
(United Kingdom) Century Motorsport	Ginetta G55 GT4	Ford Cyclone 3.7L V6	111	(United Kingdom) Anna Walewska	PA	All
(United Kingdom) Century Motorsport	Ginetta G55 GT4	Ford Cyclone 3.7L V6	111	(United Kingdom) Mike Simpson	PA	1–2, 6–10
(United Kingdom) Century Motorsport	Ginetta G55 GT4	Ford Cyclone 3.7L V6	111	(United Kingdom) George Gamble	PA	3
(United Kingdom) Century Motorsport	Ginetta G55 GT4	Ford Cyclone 3.7L V6	111	(United Kingdom) Nathan Freke	PA	4–5
(United Kingdom) / Optimum Motorsport (Note: Car No. 46 entered as Optimum Motorsport and car No. 501 entered as PMW Expo Racing / Optimum Motorsport.); (United Kingdom) / PMW Expo Racing / Optimum Motorsport	Ginetta G55 GT4	Ford Cyclone 3.7L V6	46	(United Kingdom) Adrian Barwick	PA	6
(United Kingdom) / Optimum Motorsport; (United Kingdom) / PMW Expo Racing / Optimum Motorsport	Ginetta G55 GT4	Ford Cyclone 3.7L V6	46	(United Kingdom) Bradley Ellis	PA	6
(United Kingdom) / Optimum Motorsport; (United Kingdom) / PMW Expo Racing / Optimum Motorsport	Ginetta G55 GT4	Ford Cyclone 3.7L V6	501	(United Kingdom) Graham Johnson	PA	1–5
(United Kingdom) / Optimum Motorsport; (United Kingdom) / PMW Expo Racing / Optimum Motorsport	Ginetta G55 GT4	Ford Cyclone 3.7L V6	501	(United Kingdom) Mike Robinson	PA	1–5
(United Kingdom) / Optimum Motorsport; (United Kingdom) / PMW Expo Racing / Optimum Motorsport	McLaren 570S GT4	McLaren 3.8L Turbo V8	501	(United Kingdom) Graham Johnson	PA	6–10
(United Kingdom) / Optimum Motorsport; (United Kingdom) / PMW Expo Racing / Optimum Motorsport	McLaren 570S GT4	McLaren 3.8L Turbo V8	501	(United Kingdom) Mike Robinson	PA	6–10
(United Kingdom) Lanan Racing	Ginetta G55 GT4	Ford Cyclone 3.7L V6	51	(United Kingdom) David Pittard	S	All
(United Kingdom) Lanan Racing	Ginetta G55 GT4	Ford Cyclone 3.7L V6	51	(United Kingdom) Alex Reed	S	All
(United Kingdom) UltraTek Racing / Team RJN	Nissan 370Z GT4	Nissan 3.7L V6	53	(United Kingdom) Martin Plowman	PA	All
(United Kingdom) UltraTek Racing / Team RJN	Nissan 370Z GT4	Nissan 3.7L V6	53	(United Kingdom) Richard Taffinder	PA	All
(United Kingdom) UltraTek Racing / Team RJN	Nissan 370Z GT4	Nissan 3.7L V6	54	(United Kingdom) Tim Eakin	PA	All
(United Kingdom) UltraTek Racing / Team RJN	Nissan 370Z GT4	Nissan 3.7L V6	54	(United Kingdom) Kelvin Fletcher	PA	All
(United Kingdom) UltraTek Racing / Team RJN	Nissan 370Z GT4	Nissan 3.7L V6	54	(United Kingdom) Struan Moore	PA	6
(United Kingdom) HHC Motorsport	Ginetta G55 GT4	Ford Cyclone 3.7L V6	55	(United Kingdom) Stuart Middleton	S	All
(United Kingdom) HHC Motorsport	Ginetta G55 GT4	Ford Cyclone 3.7L V6	55	(United Kingdom) William Tregurtha	S	All
(United Kingdom) Tolman Motorsport	McLaren 570S GT4	McLaren 3.8L Turbo V8	56	(United Kingdom) Joe Osborne	PA	All
(United Kingdom) Tolman Motorsport	McLaren 570S GT4	McLaren 3.8L Turbo V8	56	(United Kingdom) David Pattison	PA	All
(United Kingdom) Black Bull Garage 59	McLaren 570S GT4	McLaren 3.8L Turbo V8	59	(United Kingdom) Dean MacDonald	S	All
(United Kingdom) Black Bull Garage 59	McLaren 570S GT4	McLaren 3.8L Turbo V8	59	(India) Akhil Rabindra	S	All
(United Kingdom) Black Bull Garage 59	McLaren 570S GT4	McLaren 3.8L Turbo V8	100	(United Kingdom) Sandy Mitchell	S	1–9
(United Kingdom) Black Bull Garage 59	McLaren 570S GT4	McLaren 3.8L Turbo V8	100	(United Kingdom) Ciaran Haggerty	S	1–9
(United Kingdom) Black Bull Garage 59	McLaren 570S GT4	McLaren 3.8L Turbo V8	100	(United Kingdom) Andrew Watson	S	10
(United Kingdom) Ebor GT	Maserati GranTurismo MC GT4	Maserati 4.7L V8	60	(United Kingdom) Charlie Fagg	S	7–8
(United Kingdom) Ebor GT	Maserati GranTurismo MC GT4	Maserati 4.7L V8	60	(United Kingdom) Matthew Graham	S	7–8
(United Kingdom) Academy Motorsport	Aston Martin V8 Vantage GT4	Aston Martin 4.7L V8	62	(United Kingdom) Will Moore	S	All
(United Kingdom) Academy Motorsport	Aston Martin V8 Vantage GT4	Aston Martin 4.7L V8	62	(United Kingdom) Matt Nicoll-Jones	S	All
(United Kingdom) Team Parker Racing	Porsche Cayman GT4 Clubsport MR	Porsche 3.8L flat-6	66	(United Kingdom) Nick Jones	PA	All
(United Kingdom) Team Parker Racing	Porsche Cayman GT4 Clubsport MR	Porsche 3.8L flat-6	66	(United Kingdom) Scott Malvern	PA	All
(United Kingdom) Track-Club	McLaren 570S GT4	McLaren 3.8L Turbo V8	72	(United Kingdom) Adam Balon	PA	All
(United Kingdom) Track-Club	McLaren 570S GT4	McLaren 3.8L Turbo V8	72	(United Kingdom) Adam Mackay	PA	All
(United Kingdom) GPRM	Toyota GT86	Toyota 2.0L Flat-4	86	(United Kingdom) Stefan Hodgetts	Inv	6, 9–10
(United Kingdom) GPRM	Toyota GT86	Toyota 2.0L Flat-4	86	(United Kingdom) James Fletcher	Inv	6
(United Kingdom) GPRM	Toyota GT86	Toyota 2.0L Flat-4	86	(United Kingdom) Richard Williams	Inv	9–10
(United Kingdom) Rob Boston Racing	Ginetta G55 GT4	Ford Cyclone 3.7L V6	89	(United Kingdom) Jason Baker	PA	9
(United Kingdom) Rob Boston Racing	Ginetta G55 GT4	Ford Cyclone 3.7L V6	89	(United Kingdom) Adam Gore	PA	9
(United Kingdom) Stratton Motorsport	Lotus Evora GT4	Lotus 4.0L V6	99	(United Kingdom) Stuart Hall	Inv	6
(United Kingdom) Stratton Motorsport	Lotus Evora GT4	Lotus 4.0L V6	99	(United Kingdom) Gavan Kershaw	Inv	6

Icon	Class
PA	Pro-Am Cup
S	Silver Cup
Inv	Invitational

Footnotes

== Race results ==
Bold indicates overall winner for each car class (GT3 and GT4).

Event	Circuit	GT3			GT4		
Event	Circuit	Pole position	Pro-Am winners	Silver winners	Pole position	Pro-Am winners	Silver winners
1	Oulton Park	No. 31 Team Parker Racing	**No. 33 Barwell Motorsport**	No. 69 Century Motorsport	No. 100 Black Bull Garage 59	**No. 72 Track-Club**	No. 55 HHC Motorsport
1	Oulton Park	(United Kingdom) Rick Parfitt, Jr. (United Kingdom) Seb Morris	**(United Kingdom) Phil Keen** **(United Kingdom) Jon Minshaw**	(United Kingdom) Nathan Freke (United States) Harry Gottsacker	(United Kingdom) Ciaran Haggerty (United Kingdom) Sandy Mitchell	**(United Kingdom) Adam Balon** **(United Kingdom) Adam Mackay**	(United Kingdom) William Tregurtha (United Kingdom) Stuart Middleton
2	Oulton Park	No. 31 Team Parker Racing	**No. 33 Barwell Motorsport**	No. 24 Macmillan AMR	No. 111 Century Motorsport	No. 29 In2Racing	**No. 51 Lanan Racing**
2	Oulton Park	(United Kingdom) Rick Parfitt, Jr. (United Kingdom) Seb Morris	**(United Kingdom) Phil Keen** **(United Kingdom) Jon Minshaw**	(United Kingdom) James Littlejohn (United Kingdom) Jack Mitchell	(United Kingdom) Mike Simpson (United Kingdom) Anna Walewska	(United Kingdom) Matthew Graham (United Kingdom) Marcus Hoggarth	**(United Kingdom) David Pittard** **(United Kingdom) Alex Reed**
3	Rockingham	No. 1 TF Sport	**No. 31 Team Parker Racing**	No. 24 Macmillan AMR	No. 55 HHC Motorsport	No. 501 PMW Expo Racing / Optimum Motorsport	**No. 55 HHC Motorsport**
3	Rockingham	(United Kingdom) Jonathan Adam (United Kingdom) Derek Johnston	**(United Kingdom) Rick Parfitt, Jr.** **(United Kingdom) Seb Morris**	(United Kingdom) James Littlejohn (United Kingdom) Jack Mitchell	(United Kingdom) William Tregurtha (United Kingdom) Stuart Middleton	(United Kingdom) Graham Johnson (United Kingdom) Mike Robinson	**(United Kingdom) William Tregurtha** **(United Kingdom) Stuart Middleton**
4	Snetterton	No. 24 Macmillan AMR	**No. 33 Barwell Motorsport**	No. 24 Macmillan AMR	No. 51 Lanan Racing	No. 72 Track-Club	**No. 55 HHC Motorsport**
4	Snetterton	(United Kingdom) James Littlejohn (United Kingdom) Jack Mitchell	**(United Kingdom) Phil Keen** **(United Kingdom) Jon Minshaw**	(United Kingdom) James Littlejohn (United Kingdom) Jack Mitchell	(United Kingdom) David Pittard (United Kingdom) Alex Reed	(United Kingdom) Adam Balon (United Kingdom) Adam Mackay	**(United Kingdom) William Tregurtha** **(United Kingdom) Stuart Middleton**
5	Snetterton	No. 33 Barwell Motorsport	**No. 1 TF Sport**	No. 24 Macmillan AMR	No. 56 Tolman Motorsport	No. 56 Tolman Motorsport	**No. 100 Black Bull Garage 59**
5	Snetterton	(United Kingdom) Phil Keen (United Kingdom) Jon Minshaw	**(United Kingdom) Jonathan Adam** **(United Kingdom) Derek Johnston**	(United Kingdom) James Littlejohn (United Kingdom) Jack Mitchell	(United Kingdom) Joe Osborne (United Kingdom) David Pattison	(United Kingdom) Joe Osborne (United Kingdom) David Pattison	**(United Kingdom) Ciaran Haggerty** **(United Kingdom) Sandy Mitchell**
6	Silverstone	No. 24 Macmillan AMR	**No. 31 Team Parker Racing**	No. 24 Macmillan AMR	No. 55 HHC Motorsport	No. 62 Academy Motorsport	**No. 72 Track-Club**
6	Silverstone	(United Kingdom) James Littlejohn (United Kingdom) Jack Mitchell	**(United Kingdom) Rick Parfitt, Jr.** **(United Kingdom) Seb Morris**	(United Kingdom) James Littlejohn (United Kingdom) Jack Mitchell	(United Kingdom) William Tregurtha (United Kingdom) Stuart Middleton	(United Kingdom) Will Moore (United Kingdom) Matt Nicoll-Jones	**(United Kingdom) Adam Balon** **(United Kingdom) Adam Mackay**
7	Spa-Francorchamps	No. 31 Team Parker Racing	**No. 33 Barwell Motorsport**	No. 24 Macmillan AMR	No. 55 HHC Motorsport	UltraTek Racing / Team RJN	**No. 60 Ebor GT**
7	Spa-Francorchamps	(United Kingdom) Rick Parfitt, Jr. (United Kingdom) Seb Morris	**(United Kingdom) Phil Keen** **(United Kingdom) Jon Minshaw**	(United Kingdom) James Littlejohn (United Kingdom) Jack Mitchell	(United Kingdom) William Tregurtha (United Kingdom) Stuart Middleton	(United Kingdom) Martin Plowman (United Kingdom) Richard Taffinder	**(United Kingdom) Charlie Fagg** **(United Kingdom) Matthew Graham**
8	Spa-Francorchamps	No. 33 Barwell Motorsport	**No. 7 Team Parker Racing**	No. 24 Macmillan AMR	No. 56 Tolman Motorsport	No. 56 Tolman Motorsport	**No. 60 Ebor GT**
8	Spa-Francorchamps	(United Kingdom) Phil Keen (United Kingdom) Jon Minshaw	**(United Kingdom) Ian Loggie** **(United Kingdom) Callum MacLeod**	(United Kingdom) James Littlejohn (United Kingdom) Jack Mitchell	(United Kingdom) Joe Osborne (United Kingdom) David Pattison	(United Kingdom) Joe Osborne (United Kingdom) David Pattison	**(United Kingdom) Charlie Fagg** **(United Kingdom) Matthew Graham**
9	Brands Hatch	No. 33 Barwell Motorsport	**No. 31 Team Parker Racing**	No. 24 Macmillan AMR	No. 62 Academy Motorsport	No. 56 Tolman Motorsport	**No. 42 Macmillan AMR**
9	Brands Hatch	(United Kingdom) Phil Keen (United Kingdom) Jon Minshaw	**(United Kingdom) Rick Parfitt, Jr.** **(United Kingdom) Seb Morris**	(United Kingdom) James Littlejohn (United Kingdom) Jack Mitchell	(United Kingdom) Will Moore (United Kingdom) Matt Nicoll-Jones	(United Kingdom) Joe Osborne (United Kingdom) David Pattison	**(Denmark) Jan Jønck** **(United Kingdom) William Phillips**
10	Donington Park	No. 11 TF Sport	**No. 1 TF Sport**	No. 08 JRM Racing	No. 62 Academy Motorsport	**No. 501 PMW Expo Racing / Optimum Motorsport**	No. 55 HHC Motorsport
10	Donington Park	(United Kingdom) Jon Barnes (United Kingdom) Mark Farmer	**(United Kingdom) Jonathan Adam** **(United Kingdom) Derek Johnston**	(United Kingdom) Charlie Fagg (United Kingdom) Ben Green	(United Kingdom) Will Moore (United Kingdom) Matt Nicoll-Jones	**(United Kingdom) Graham Johnson** **(United Kingdom) Mike Robinson**	(United Kingdom) William Tregurtha (United Kingdom) Stuart Middleton

== Championship standings ==
Points system

Points are awarded as follows:

Length	1	2	3	4	5	6	7	8	9	10
60 mins	25	18	15	12	10	8	6	4	2	1
60+ mins	37.5	27	22.5	18	15	12	9	6	3	1.5

=== Drivers' championships ===
==== GT3 ====
Pos	Driver	OUL		ROC	SNE		SIL	SPA		BRH	DON	Points
1	(United Kingdom) Seb Morris	4	5	1	7	4	1	5	7	1	3	191
1	(United Kingdom) Rick Parfitt Jr.	4	5	1	7	4	1	5	7	1	3	191
2	(United Kingdom) Phil Keen	1	1	4	1	6	4	1	9	5	DSQ	161
2	(United Kingdom) Jon Minshaw	1	1	4	1	6	4	1	9	5	DSQ	161
3	(United Kingdom) Jonathan Adam	3	2	8	5	1	9	9	6	4	1	142.5
3	(United Kingdom) Derek Johnston	3	2	8	5	1	9	9	6	4	1	142.5
4	(United Kingdom) Sam Tordoff	2	Ret	5	2	2	6	8	Ret	2	4	130
4	(United Kingdom) Liam Griffin	2	Ret	5	2	2	6	8	Ret	2	4	130
5	(United Kingdom) Mark Farmer	5	3	7	10	3	7	6	4	3	2	128.5
5	(United Kingdom) Jon Barnes	5	3	7	10	3	7	6	4	3	2	128.5
6	(United Kingdom) Jack Mitchell	Ret	6	3	3	5	2	10	3	10		100
6	(United Kingdom) James Littlejohn	Ret	6	3	3	5	2	10	3	10		100
7	(Republic of Ireland) Matt Griffin	6	4	2	6	7	3	DNS	DNS	7		92.5
7	(United Kingdom) Duncan Cameron	6	4	2	6	7	3	DNS	DNS	7		92.5
8	(United Kingdom) Callum MacLeod	7	DSQ	9	9	Ret	11	4	1	8	6	66
8	(United Kingdom) Ian Loggie	7	DSQ	9	9	Ret	11	4	1	8	6	66
9	(United Kingdom) Richard Neary	9	9	10	8	9	5	7	Ret	6	7	53.5
10	(United Kingdom) Ryan Ratcliffe	10	7	6	4	8	8	11	10			42
10	(United Kingdom) Lee Mowle	10	7	6	4	8	8	11	10			42
11	(United Kingdom) Adam Christodoulou						5	7	Ret	6	7	42
12	(United Kingdom) Stuart Leonard							2	2			36
12	(France) Alain Ferte							2	2			36
13	(United Kingdom) Martin Short	9	9	10	8	9	5					26.5
14	(Netherlands) Carlo van Dam							3	8			19
14	(Thailand) Piti Bhirombhakdi							3	8			19
15	(United Kingdom) Charlie Fagg										5	15
15	(United Kingdom) Ben Green										5	15
16	(United Kingdom) Kenneth Heyer							12	5			10
16	(Germany) Patrick Assenheimer							12	5			10
17	(United Kingdom) Nathan Freke	8	8	11							Ret	8
18	(United States) Harry Gottsacker	8	8	11								8
19	(United Kingdom) Mike Brown									9		3
19	(United Kingdom) Matt Manderson									9		3
20	(Norway) Aleksander Schjerpen						10					1.5
21	(United Kingdom) Charlie Robertson	Ret	DNS	12			10					1.5
22	(United States) Parker Chase	Ret	DNS	12								0
23	(Finland) Patrick Kujala							13	Ret			0
23	(Switzerland) Adrian Amstutz							13	Ret			0
24	(United Kingdom) Ben Tuck									DNS	Ret	0
25	(United Kingdom) Tom Hibbert									DNS		0

Colour	Result
Gold	Winner
Silver	Second place
Bronze	Third place
Green	Points classification
Blue	Non-points classification
Blue	Non-classified finish (NC)
Purple	Retired, not classified (Ret)
Red	Did not qualify (DNQ)
Red	Did not pre-qualify (DNPQ)
Black	Disqualified (DSQ)
White	Did not start (DNS)
White	Withdrew (WD)
White	Race cancelled (C)
Blank	Did not practice (DNP)
Blank	Did not arrive (DNA)
Blank	Excluded (EX)
