= 2020 DTM Trophy =

Auto racing series held in 2020

The 2020 DTM Trophy was the inaugural season of the DTM support series for GT cars eligible for E2-SH and E2-SC-class FIA categories. The series will be run by ITR, the association also organising the Deutsche Tourenwagen Masters. The championship ran as part of selected DTM race weekends in 2020, commencing in Spa-Franchorchamps on 1 August and finishing on 8 November at the Hockenheimring.

== Teams and drivers ==
The following teams and drivers compete in the 2020 DTM Trophy. All teams compete with tyres supplied by Hankook. The entry list was revealed on 29 July 2020.

Make	Car	Team	No.	Driver	Status	Rounds
Mercedes-Benz	Mercedes-AMG GT4	(Germany) Leipert Motorsport	2	(Germany) Fidel Leib	XP	All
Mercedes-Benz	Mercedes-AMG GT4	(Germany) Leipert Motorsport	4	(Poland) Jan Kisiel		All
Mercedes-Benz	Mercedes-AMG GT4	(Germany) Leipert Motorsport	9	(Spain) Marc de Fulgencio	J	All
Mercedes-Benz	Mercedes-AMG GT4	(Germany) Superdrink by Bremotion	7	(Germany) Jan Philipp Springob	J	All
Mercedes-Benz	Mercedes-AMG GT4	(Austria) HP Racing International	46	(Germany) Tim Heinemann		All
Audi	Audi R8 LMS GT4 Evo	(Germany) Racing One	5	(Switzerland) Lucas Mauron	J	All
Audi	Audi R8 LMS GT4 Evo	(Germany) Racing One	6	(Netherlands) Kelvin Snoeks		1–3
Audi	Audi R8 LMS GT4 Evo	(Germany) Racing One	6	(Germany) Dominique Schaak		4–6
Audi	Audi R8 LMS GT4 Evo	(Romania) Carbogaz Racing	77	(Romania) David Serban	J	1–4, 6
Audi	Audi R8 LMS GT4 Evo	(Germany) Superdrink by Spielkind Racing	94	(Germany) Felix von der Laden		1–4
BMW	BMW M4 GT4	(Germany) FK Performance	10	(United Kingdom) Ben Green	J	All
BMW	BMW M4 GT4	(Germany) FK Performance	11	(Germany) Luke Wankmüller	J	All
BMW	BMW M4 GT4	(Germany) Walkenhorst Motorsport	34	(United Kingdom) Ben Tuck		All
BMW	BMW M4 GT4	(Germany) Walkenhorst Motorsport	35	(Netherlands) Max Koebolt		All
BMW	BMW M4 GT4	(Switzerland) Hofor Racing by Bonk Motorsport	61	(Germany) Michael Schrey	G	3
Porsche	Porsche 718 Cayman GT4 Clubsport	(Germany) Phoenix Racing	17	(Switzerland) Rudolf Rhyn	J	All
Porsche	Porsche 718 Cayman GT4 Clubsport	(Germany) Allied Racing	30	(Switzerland) Felix Hirsiger	J	1–4
Porsche	Porsche 718 Cayman GT4 Clubsport	(Germany) Allied Racing	30	(Denmark) Bastian Buus		5
Porsche	Porsche 718 Cayman GT4 Clubsport	(Germany) Allied Racing	30	(Austria) Nicolas Schöll	J	6
Porsche	Porsche Cayman PRO4 GT4	(Germany) PROsport Performance	18	(Germany) Peter Terting		All
KTM	KTM X-Bow GT4	(Germany) Teichmann Racing	19	(Germany) Kevin Strohschänk		1–2
KTM	KTM X-Bow GT4	(Germany) Teichmann Racing	19	(Austria) Reinhard Kofler		3
KTM	KTM X-Bow GT4	(Germany) Teichmann Racing	20	(Austria) Laura Kraihamer	G	2
KTM	KTM X-Bow GT4	(Germany) Teichmann Racing	20	(Germany) Georg Griesemann	G	3
KTM	KTM X-Bow GT4	(Germany) Teichmann Racing	58	(Germany) Yves Volte	G	2
Toyota	Toyota GR Supra GT4	(Germany) TGR Ring Racing	90	(Argentina) José María López		2, 6
Toyota	Toyota GR Supra GT4	(Germany) TGR Ring Racing	90	(Germany) Heiko Hammel		3
Toyota	Toyota GR Supra GT4	(Germany) TGR Ring Racing	90	(Belgium) Nico Verdonck		4–6
Toyota	Toyota GR Supra GT4	(Germany) TGR Ring Racing	91	(Germany) Heiko Hammel		2
Toyota	Toyota GR Supra GT4	(Germany) TGR Ring Racing	91	(Germany) Andreas Gülden	XP	3
Toyota	Toyota GR Supra GT4	(Germany) TGR Ring Racing	91	(Germany) Michael Tischner	XP	4–5

Icon	Legend
J	Junior class
XP	XP class
G	Guest driver (Note: As a guest driver, the driver is ineligible to score points)

== Calendar ==
The race calendar follows the DTM calendar, and was therefore also altered multiple times in response to the COVID-19 pandemic.

Round	Circuit	Race 1	Race 2
1	(Belgium) Circuit de Spa-Francorchamps	1 August	2 August
2	(Germany) Lausitzring	22 August	23 August
3	(Germany) Nürburgring Grand Prix	12 September	13 September
4	(Germany) Nürburgring Sprint	19 September	20 September
5	(Belgium) Circuit Zolder	17 October	18 October
6	(Germany) Hockenheimring	7 November	8 November

== Results and standings ==
=== Season summary ===
Round		Circuit	Pole position	Fastest lap	Winning driver	Winning team
1	R1	(Belgium) Spa-Francorchamps	(United Kingdom) Ben Tuck	(Spain) Marc de Fulgencio	(United Kingdom) Ben Tuck	(Germany) Walkenhorst Motorsport
1	R2	(Belgium) Spa-Francorchamps	(Germany) Tim Heinemann	(United Kingdom) Ben Green	(United Kingdom) Ben Green	(Germany) FK Performance
2	R1	(Germany) Lausitzring	(Switzerland) Felix Hirsiger	(Poland) Jan Kisiel	(Germany) Tim Heinemann	(Austria) HP Racing International
2	R2	(Germany) Lausitzring	(Poland) Jan Kisiel	(Germany) Tim Heinemann	(Germany) Tim Heinemann	(Austria) HP Racing International
3	R1	(Germany) Nürburgring Grand Prix	(Germany) Tim Heinemann	(Germany) Tim Heinemann	(Germany) Tim Heinemann	(Austria) HP Racing International
3	R2	(Germany) Nürburgring Grand Prix	(Germany) Tim Heinemann	(Germany) Tim Heinemann	(Germany) Tim Heinemann	(Austria) HP Racing International
4	R1	(Germany) Nürburgring Sprint	(Germany) Tim Heinemann	(Germany) Tim Heinemann	(Germany) Tim Heinemann	(Austria) HP Racing International
4	R2	(Germany) Nürburgring Sprint	(Germany) Tim Heinemann	(Germany) Peter Terting	(Germany) Tim Heinemann	(Austria) HP Racing International
5	R1	(Belgium) Circuit Zolder	(Switzerland) Lucas Mauron	(Switzerland) Lucas Mauron	(Switzerland) Lucas Mauron	(Germany) racing one
5	R2	(Belgium) Circuit Zolder	(Switzerland) Lucas Mauron	(Switzerland) Lucas Mauron	(Switzerland) Lucas Mauron	(Germany) racing one
6	R1	(Germany) Hockenheimring	(Switzerland) Lucas Mauron	(Switzerland) Lucas Mauron	(Switzerland) Lucas Mauron	(Germany) racing one
6	R2	(Germany) Hockenheimring	(Switzerland) Lucas Mauron	(Switzerland) Lucas Mauron	(Germany) Tim Heinemann	(Austria) HP Racing International

=== Scoring system ===
Points were awarded to the top ten classified finishers as follows:

Race Position	1st	2nd	3rd	4th	5th	6th	7th	8th	9th	10th
Points	25	18	15	12	10	8	6	4	2	1

Additionally, the top three placed drivers in qualifying also received points:

Qualifying Position	1st	2nd	3rd
Points	3	2	1

=== Drivers' championship ===
No.	Driver(s)	Points
1	(Germany) Tim Heinemann	275
2	(Poland) Jan Kisiel	165
3	(United Kingdom) Ben Tuck	133
4	(United Kingdom) Ben Green	120
5	(Switzerland) Lucas Mauron	115
6	(Germany) Peter Terting	72
7	(Netherlands) Max Koebolt	62
8	(Spain) Marc de Fulgencio	62
9	(Germany) Jan Philipp Springob	54
10	(Switzerland) Felix Hirsiger	52
11	(Belgium) Nico Verdonck	36
12	(Austria) Nicolas Schöll	29
13	(Germany) Luke Wankmüller	24
14	(Austria) Reinhard Kofler	21
15	(Switzerland) Rudolf Rhyn	20
16	(Netherlands) Kelvin Snoeks	12
17	(Argentina) José María López	12
18	(Denmark) Bastian Buus	12
19	(Germany) Felix von der Laden	4
20	(Germany) Fidel Leib	3
21	(Germany) Dominique Schaak	1
23	(Germany) Kevin Strohschänk	0
22	(Germany) Heiko Hammel	0
24	(Romania) David Serban	0
25	(Germany) Michael Tischner	0
26	(Germany) Andreas Gülden	0
27	(Germany) Michael Schrey	0

=== Junior standings ===
The junior standings is based on only race results of eligible drivers, and thus any bonus points for qualifying do not count towards the junior classification.

Pos.	Driver	Points
1	(United Kingdom) Ben Green	113
2	(Switzerland) Lucas Mauron	103
3	(Spain) Marc de Fulgencio	60
4	(Germany) Jan Philipp Springob	54
5	(Switzerland) Felix Hirsiger	49
6	(Austria) Nicolas Schöll	25
7	(Germany) Luke Wankmüller	24
8	(Switzerland) Rudolf Rhyn	18
9	(Denmark) Bastian Buus	12
10	(Romania) David Serban	0
Pos.	Driver	Points

=== XP standings ===
Pos.	Driver	Points
1	(Germany) Fidel Leib	286
2	(Germany) Michael Tischner	72
3	(Germany) Andreas Gülden	50
Pos.	Driver	Points

=== Teams' championship ===
Pos.	Team	Points (Note: The teams championship only includes results of the highest placed entrant of each team. Any subsequent point scoring entrant of the same team is ignored. This is valid for both the race results as well as qualifying bonus points.)
1	(Austria) HP Racing International	254
2	(Germany) Leipert Motorsport	161
3	(Germany) Walkenhorst Motorsport	149
4	(Germany) FK Performance Motorsport	135
5	(Germany) Hella Pagid-Racing One	133
6	(Germany) Allied Racing	51
7	(Germany) PROsport Performance	70
8	(Germany) Superdrink by Bremotion	68
9	(Germany) Ring Racing	58
10	(Germany) Phoenix Racing	32
11	(Germany) Teichmann Racing	31
12	(Romania) Carbogaz Racing	4
13	(Switzerland) Hofor Racing by Bonk Motorsport	0
Pos.	Team	Points
