= 2021 DTM Trophy =

Auto racing series held in 2021

The 2021 DTM Trophy was the second season of the DTM support series for GT cars eligible for E2-SH and E2-SC-class FIA categories. The series was run by ITR, the association also organising the Deutsche Tourenwagen Masters. The championship ran as part of selected DTM race weekends in 2021, commencing in Monza on 19 June and finishing on 3 October at the Hockenheimring.

== Teams and drivers ==
The following teams and drivers compete in the 2021 DTM Trophy. All teams competed with tyres supplied by Hankook.

| Make | Car | Team | No. | Driver | Status | Rounds |
|---|---|---|---|---|---|---|
| Aston Martin | Aston Martin Vantage AMR GT4 | (Germany) PROsport Racing | 1 | (Germany) Tim Heinemann | | 1–4 |
| Aston Martin | Aston Martin Vantage AMR GT4 | (Germany) PROsport Racing | 19 | (Denmark) Patrik Matthiesen | | 1 |
| Aston Martin | Aston Martin Vantage AMR GT4 | (Germany) PROsport Racing | 19 | (Germany) Mike David Ortmann | | 2–4 |
| Audi | Audi R8 LMS GT4 Evo | (Germany) Heide-Motorsport | 17 | (Germany) Sophie Hofmann | | All |
| Audi | Audi R8 LMS GT4 Evo | (Germany) Heide-Motorsport | 31 | (Germany) Jörg Viebahn | | 1–2 |
| Audi | Audi R8 LMS GT4 Evo | (Germany) Heide-Motorsport | 31 | (Switzerland) Miklas Born | | 3 |
| Audi | Audi R8 LMS GT4 Evo | (Germany) Heide-Motorsport | 31 | (Germany) Sebastian Kornely | | 4–7 |
| Audi | Audi R8 LMS GT4 Evo | (Germany) Heide-Motorsport | 33 | (Switzerland) Lucas Mauron | | All |
| Audi | Audi R8 LMS GT4 Evo | (Germany) Hella Pagid - racing one | 18 | (Romania) David-Mihal Serban | | 1-6 |
| Audi | Audi R8 LMS GT4 Evo | (Germany) T3 Motorsport | 22 | (Germany) Lirim Zendeli | G | 3 |
| BMW | BMW M4 GT4 | (Switzerland) Hofor Racing by Bonk Motorsport | 2 | (Germany) Michael Schrey | | 1–5, 7 |
| BMW | BMW M4 GT4 | (Switzerland) Hofor Racing by Bonk Motorsport | 3 | (Germany) Christopher Rink | | 1–5 |
| BMW | BMW M4 GT4 | (Switzerland) Hofor Racing by Bonk Motorsport | 3 | (Italy) Gabriele Piana | | 7 |
| BMW | BMW M4 GT4 | (Switzerland) Hofor Racing by Bonk Motorsport | 4 | (Germany) Philipp Stahlschmidt | | 1–5 |
| BMW | BMW M4 GT4 | (Germany) FK Performance Motorsport | 5 | (Bulgaria) Steriyan Folev | G | 6 |
| BMW | BMW M4 GT4 | (Germany) FK Performance Motorsport | 10 | (United Kingdom) Ben Green | | All |
| BMW | BMW M4 GT4 | (Germany) FK Performance Motorsport | 11 | (Germany) Moritz Löhner | | All |
| BMW | BMW M4 GT4 | (Germany) FK Performance Motorsport | 50 | (Switzerland) Yann Zimmer | | All |
| BMW | BMW M4 GT4 | (Italy) Ceccato Motors | 9 | (Italy) Simone Riccitelli | G | 1–2 |
| BMW | BMW M4 GT4 | (Germany) Team Driverse | 12 | (Netherlands) Sandra van der Sloot | G | 5 |
| BMW | BMW M4 GT4 | (Germany) Walkenhorst Motorsport | 34 | (Germany) Theo Oeverhaus | | All |
| BMW | BMW M4 GT4 | (Germany) Walkenhorst Motorsport | 35 | (United States) Chandler Hull | | 1–3 |
| BMW | BMW M4 GT4 | (Germany) Walkenhorst Motorsport | 35 | (Germany) Dennis Fetzer | | 4 |
| BMW | BMW M4 GT4 | (Germany) Walkenhorst Motorsport | 35 | (United Kingdom) Ben Tuck | | 5 |
| KTM | KTM X-Bow GT4 | (Austria) True Racing by Reiter Engineering | 23 | (Austria) Florian Janits | | 2, 4–5 |
| KTM | KTM X-Bow GT4 | (Austria) True Racing by Reiter Engineering | 25 | (Austria) Laura Kraihamer | | 1–4, 6–7 |
| KTM | KTM X-Bow GT4 | (Germany) RMN Racing | 24 | (Austria) Reinhard Kofler | | 1, 3, 5–7 |
| Mercedes-AMG | Mercedes-AMG GT4 | (Germany) Leipert Motorsport | 7 | (Spain) Marc de Fulgencio | G | 7 |
| Mercedes-AMG | Mercedes-AMG GT4 | (Germany) Schnitzelalm Racing | 12 | (Germany) Marcel Marchewicz | G | 3 |
| Mercedes-AMG | Mercedes-AMG GT4 | (Germany) CV Performance Group | 84 | (Finland) Matias Salonen | | All |
| Mercedes-AMG | Mercedes-AMG GT4 | (Germany) CV Performance Group | 85 | (United Kingdom) William Tregurtha | | All |
| Porsche | Porsche Cayman PRO4 GT4 | (Germany) PROsport Racing | 21 | (United Kingdom) Adam Christodoulou | | 1 |
| Porsche | Porsche Cayman PRO4 GT4 | (Germany) PROsport Racing | 21 | (Germany) Maximilian Schmidt | | 2–4 |
| Toyota | Toyota GR Supra GT4 | (Germany) TGR Ring Racing | 90 | (Belgium) Nico Verdonck | | All |
| Toyota | Toyota GR Supra GT4 | (Germany) TGR Ring Racing | 91 | (Netherlands) Stéphane Kox | | 1–2, 4–7 |

| Icon | Legend |
|---|---|
| J | Junior class |
| XP | XP class |
| G | Guest driver (Note: As a guest driver, the driver is ineligible to score points) |

== Calendar ==
| Round | Circuit | Race 1 | Race 2 |
|---|---|---|---|
| 1 | (Italy) Monza Circuit | 19 June | 20 June |
| 2 | (Germany) Lausitzring | 24 July | 25 July |
| 3 | (Germany) Nürburgring Grand Prix | 21 August | 22 August |
| 4 | (Austria) Red Bull Ring | 4 September | 5 September |
| 5 | (Netherlands) TT Circuit Assen | 18 September | 19 September |
| 6 | (Germany) Hockenheimring | 2 October | 3 October |
| 7 | (Germany) Norisring | 9 October | 10 October |

== Results and standings ==
=== Season summary ===
| Round | | Circuit | Pole position | Fastest lap | Winning driver | Winning team |
|---|---|---|---|---|---|---|
| 1 | R1 | (Italy) Monza Circuit | (United Kingdom) Ben Green | (United Kingdom) William Tregurtha | (United Kingdom) Ben Green | (Germany) FK Performance Motorsport |
| 1 | R2 | (Italy) Monza Circuit | (United Kingdom) William Tregurtha | (Germany) Tim Heinemann | (Germany) Michael Schrey | (Switzerland) Hofor Racing by Bonk Motorsport |
| 2 | R1 | (Germany) Lausitzring | (United Kingdom) William Tregurtha | (United Kingdom) William Tregurtha | (Belgium) Nico Verdonck | (Germany) TGR Ring Racing |
| 2 | R2 | (Germany) Lausitzring | (Germany) Tim Heinemann | (United Kingdom) Ben Green | (United Kingdom) William Tregurtha | (Germany) CV Performance Group |
| 3 | R1 | (Germany) Nürburgring Grand Prix | (United Kingdom) Ben Green | (United Kingdom) Ben Green | (United Kingdom) Ben Green | (Germany) FK Performance Motorsport |
| 3 | R2 | (Germany) Nürburgring Grand Prix | (Germany) Michael Schrey | (Austria) Reinhard Kofler | (Germany) Marcel Marchewicz | (Germany) Schnitzelalm Racing |
| 4 | R1 | (Austria) Red Bull Ring | (Germany) Tim Heinemann | (United Kingdom) Ben Green | (United Kingdom) Ben Green | (Germany) FK Performance Motorsport |
| 4 | R2 | (Austria) Red Bull Ring | (Germany) Mike David Ortmann | (United Kingdom) William Tregurtha | (United Kingdom) William Tregurtha | (Germany) CV Performance Group |
| 5 | R1 | (Netherlands) TT Circuit Assen | (Switzerland) Lucas Mauron | (Switzerland) Lucas Mauron | (Switzerland) Lucas Mauron | (Germany) Heide-Motorsport |
| 5 | R2 | (Netherlands) TT Circuit Assen | (Austria) Reinhard Kofler | (Austria) Reinhard Kofler | (Austria) Reinhard Kofler | (Germany) RMN Racing |
| 6 | R1 | (Germany) Hockenheimring | (United Kingdom) Ben Green | (United Kingdom) Ben Green | (Germany) Theo Oeverhaus | (Germany) Walkenhorst Motorsport |
| 6 | R2 | (Germany) Hockenheimring | (United Kingdom) Ben Green | (United Kingdom) Ben Green | (United Kingdom) Ben Green | (Germany) FK Performance Motorsport |
| 7 | R1 | (Germany) Norisring | (Belgium) Nico Verdonck | (Belgium) Nico Verdonck | (Belgium) Nico Verdonck | (Germany) TGR Ring Racing |
| 7 | R2 | (Germany) Norisring | (United Kingdom) William Tregurtha | (United Kingdom) William Tregurtha | (United Kingdom) Ben Green | (Germany) FK Performance Motorsport |

=== Scoring system ===
Points were awarded to the top ten classified finishers as follows:

| Race Position | **1st** | **2nd** | **3rd** | **4th** | **5th** | **6th** | **7th** | **8th** | **9th** | **10th** |
| Points | 25 | 18 | 15 | 12 | 10 | 8 | 6 | 4 | 2 | 1 |

Additionally, the top three placed drivers in qualifying also received points:

| Qualifying Position | **1st** | **2nd** | **3rd** |
| Points | 3 | 2 | 1 |

=== Drivers' championship ===
| Pos. | Driver | MNZ (Italy) | | LAU (Germany) | | NÜR (Germany) | | RBR (Austria) | | ASS (Netherlands) | | HOC (Germany) | | NOR (Germany) | | Points |
|---|---|---|---|---|---|---|---|---|---|---|---|---|---|---|---|---|
| 1 | (United Kingdom) Ben Green | **1** | 7 | 2 | 2 | **1** | 7 | 1 | 3 | 3 | 6 | **9** | **1** | 2 | 1 | 247 |
| 2 | (United Kingdom) William Tregurtha | 2 | **2** | **3** | 1 | 4 | 4 | 21 | 1 | 5 | 3 | 2 | 2 | 4 | **2** | 237 |
| 3 | (Belgium) Nico Verdonck | 14 | 4 | 1 | Ret | 6 | 3 | 9 | Ret | 2 | 7 | DNS | 4 | **1** | 3 | 149 |
| 4 | (Germany) Michael Schrey | 4 | 1 | 6 | 3 | 2 | **8** | 8 | 2 | 11 | 9 | | | 8 | 8 | 124 |
| 5 | (Switzerland) Lucas Mauron | Ret | 13 | Ret | 13 | 5 | 2 | 13 | Ret | **1** | 2 | 6 | 6 | 5 | 6 | 124 |
| 6 | (Germany) Theo Oeverhaus | 8 | 8 | 5 | 4 | 11 | 11 | 3 | Ret | 10 | 4 | 1 | 3 | 6 | 9 | 119 |
| 7 | (Switzerland) Yann Zimmer | 6 | 6 | 4 | 5 | 15 | 6 | 2 | Ret | 8 | 8 | 4 | Ret | 7 | 4 | 108 |
| 8 | (Germany) Moritz Löhner | 3 | 9 | 9 | 7 | 7 | 10 | 5 | Ret | 4 | 10 | 3 | Ret | Ret | Ret | 82 |
| 9 | (Austria) Reinhard Kofler | 12 | 10 | | | 9 | 17 | | | 6 | **1** | 5 | 5 | 11 | DNS | 65 |
| 10 | (Germany) Tim Heinemann | DNS | 3 | 13 | **Ret** | 3 | 5 | **6** | Ret | | | | | | | 60 |
| 11 | (Finland) Matias Salonen | 11 | 5 | WD | WD | 16 | 22 | 7 | 6 | Ret | 11 | 7 | Ret | Ret | DNS | 31 |
| 12 | (Austria) Florian Janits | | | 7 | Ret | | | 12 | 8 | 7 | 5 | | | | | 31 |
| 13 | (Germany) Christopher Rink | 7 | 18 | Ret | 9 | 14 | 16 | 15 | 5 | 12 | Ret | | | | | 22 |
| 14 | (Germany) Mike David Ortmann | | | 16 | 11 | 10 | 13 | 4 | **DNS** | | | | | | | 20 |
| 15 | (Netherlands) Stéphane Kox | Ret | 16 | 11 | 8 | | | 17 | 11 | 14 | 17 | 8 | 7 | 10 | Ret | 20 |
| 16 | (Germany) Philipp Stahlschmidt | 9 | 12 | 10 | 12 | 13 | 15 | 10 | 4 | 13 | 14 | | | | | 19 |
| 17 | (Germany) Sophie Hofmann | 17 | 14 | 14 | 16 | 22 | 20 | 19 | 13 | 16 | 16 | 13 | 10 | 12 | 7 | 11 |
| 18 | (Germany) Dennis Fetzer | | | | | | | 11 | 7 | | | | | | | 6 |
| 19 | (Romania) David-Mihal Serban | 15 | 17 | 12 | 17 | 20 | 18 | 18 | 10 | 17 | 13 | 12 | 9 | | | 5 |
| 20 | (Austria) Laura Kraihamer | 16 | 15 | Ret | 15 | 17 | 14 | 14 | 9 | | | 11 | 11 | 13 | 11 | 5 |
| 21 | (Italy) Gabriele Piana | | | | | | | | | | | | | 9 | Ret | 4 |
| 22 | (United Kingdom) Ben Tuck | | | | | | | | | 9 | 12 | | | | | 2 |
| 23 | (Germany) Jörg Viebahn | 10 | 11 | 15 | 14 | | | | | | | | | | | 2 |
| 24 | (Germany) Sebastian Kornely | | | | | | | 20 | 14 | 18 | 18 | DNS | 12 | 14 | 10 | 2 |
| 25 | (United States) Chandler Hull | 13 | WD | Ret | 10 | 21 | 19 | | | | | | | | | 2 |
| 26 | (Switzerland) Miklas Born | | | | | 18 | 12 | | | | | | | | | 1 |
| 27 | (Germany) Maximilian Schmidt | | | WD | WD | 19 | 21 | 16 | 12 | | | | | | | 0 |
| 28 | (Denmark) Patrik Matthiesen | DNS | 19 | | | | | | | | | | | | | 0 |
| 29 | (United Kingdom) Adam Christodoulou | WD | WD | | | | | | | | | | | | | 0 |
Guest drivers ineligible to score points
| — | (Germany) Marcel Marchewicz | | | | | 8 | 1 | | | | | | | | | — |
| — | (Spain) Marc de Fulgencio | | | | | | | | | | | | | 3 | 5 | — |
| — | (Italy) Simone Riccitelli | 5 | 20 | 8 | 6 | | | | | | | | | | | — |
| — | (Bulgaria) Steriyan Folev | | | | | | | | | | | 10 | 8 | | | — |
| — | (Germany) Lirim Zendeli | | | | | 12 | 9 | | | | | | | | | — |
| — | (Netherlands) Sandra van der Sloot | | | | | | | | | 15 | 15 | | | | | — |

| Colour | Result |
|---|---|
| Gold | Winner |
| Silver | Second place |
| Bronze | Third place |
| Green | Points classification |
| Blue | Non-points classification |
| Blue | Non-classified finish (NC) |
| Purple | Retired, not classified (Ret) |
| Red | Did not qualify (DNQ) |
| Red | Did not pre-qualify (DNPQ) |
| Black | Disqualified (DSQ) |
| White | Did not start (DNS) |
| White | Withdrew (WD) |
| White | Race cancelled (C) |
| Blank | Did not practice (DNP) |
| Blank | Did not arrive (DNA) |
| Blank | Excluded (EX) |

**Bold** – Pole
Italics – Fastest Lap

=== Teams' championship ===
| Pos. | Team | Points |
|---|---|---|
| 1 | (Germany) FK Performance Motorsport | 268 |
| 2 | (Germany) CV Performance Group | 253 |
| 3 | (Germany) TGR Ring-Racing | 185 |
| 4 | (Germany) Walkenhorst Motorsport | 164 |
| 5 | (Germany) Heide-Motorsport | 158 |
| 6 | (Switzerland) Hofor Racing by Bonk Motorsport | 155 |
| 7 | (Austria) True Racing by Reiter Engineering | 125 |
| 8 | (Germany) PROsport Racing | 86 |
| 9 | (Germany) Hella Pagid - racing one | 49 |
| 10 | (Germany) RMN Racing | 14 |
