= 2026 Lamborghini Super Trofeo Asia =

International motor racing series

The 2026 Lamborghini Super Trofeo Asia was the thirteenth season of the Lamborghini Super Trofeo Asia. The season began on April 24 at Sepang International Circuit, and concluded on October 23 with the World Final at the Monza Circuit.

The Pro class championship was won by William Tregurtha after a closely-fought title fight between himself and the VSR combination of Liam Sceats and Gustaw Wisniewski. The other classes were decided in fairly dominant fashion. Todd Kingsford and Chris van der Drift secured the Pro-Am title with one round to spare. Likewise, Thai drivers Suttiluck Buncharoen and Supachai Weeraborwornpong secured the Am and Lamborghini Cup classes respectively.

== Calendar ==
The calendar for the 2026 season was released on 8 November 2025, featuring six rounds.

Rnd.	Circuit	Date	Supporting
1	Sepang International Circuit, Selangor, Malaysia	24–26 April	Malaysia Touring Car Championship MTCC
2	Ningbo International Circuit, Ningbo, China	22–24 May	China GT Championship
3	Fuji Speedway, Oyama, Japan	19–21 June	Fuji Champion Race Series
4	Inje Speedium, Inje County, South Korea	16–18 July	Superrace Championship
5	Shanghai International Circuit, Shanghai, China	4–6 September	China GT Championship
6	Monza Circuit, Monza, Italy	21–23 October	Lamborghini Super Trofeo World Finals
WF	Monza Circuit, Monza, Italy	24–25 October	Lamborghini Super Trofeo World Finals

== Teams and drivers ==
All teams used the Lamborghini Huracán Super Trofeo EVO2.

Team	No.	Drivers	Class	Rounds
(Malaysia) Batmobile Racing	3	(Monaco) Jonathan Cecotto	P	2–6
(Malaysia) Batmobile Racing	3	(United Kingdom) William Tregurtha	P	2–6
(Malaysia) Batmobile Racing	33	(United Kingdom) William Tregurtha	P	1
(Malaysia) Batmobile Racing	33	(Malaysia) Kumar Prabakaran	PA	2, 4–6
(Malaysia) Batmobile Racing	33	(Malaysia) Putera Adam Halim Mu'azzam	PA	2, 4–6
(Italy) VSR	6	(New Zealand) Liam Sceats	P	All
(Italy) VSR	6	(Poland) Gustaw Wisniewski	P	All
(Italy) VSR	98	(Thailand) Todd Kingsford	PA	All
(Italy) VSR	98	(New Zealand) Chris van der Drift	PA	All
(South Korea) Racegraph (South Korea) Lamborghini Busan by Racegraph (South Korea) Lamborghini Bundang by Racegraph	7	(China) Li Zhicong	P	All
(South Korea) Racegraph (South Korea) Lamborghini Busan by Racegraph (South Korea) Lamborghini Bundang by Racegraph	7	(United States) Titus Sherlock	P	All
(South Korea) Racegraph (South Korea) Lamborghini Busan by Racegraph (South Korea) Lamborghini Bundang by Racegraph	17	(Malaysia) Eng Peng Goh	LC	All
(South Korea) Racegraph (South Korea) Lamborghini Busan by Racegraph (South Korea) Lamborghini Bundang by Racegraph	17	(Hong Kong) Terence Tse	LC	All
(South Korea) Racegraph (South Korea) Lamborghini Busan by Racegraph (South Korea) Lamborghini Bundang by Racegraph	27	(United States) Barrett Wolfe	P	4–6
(South Korea) Racegraph (South Korea) Lamborghini Busan by Racegraph (South Korea) Lamborghini Bundang by Racegraph	27	(Macau) André Couto	P	6
(South Korea) Racegraph (South Korea) Lamborghini Busan by Racegraph (South Korea) Lamborghini Bundang by Racegraph	77	(Chinese Taipei) Steven Chian	LC	1, 3–4, 6
(South Korea) Racegraph (South Korea) Lamborghini Busan by Racegraph (South Korea) Lamborghini Bundang by Racegraph	77	(South Korea) Kim Sang Ho	LC	1, 4, 6
(South Korea) Racegraph (South Korea) Lamborghini Busan by Racegraph (South Korea) Lamborghini Bundang by Racegraph	77	(China) Zexuan Liu	PA	2
(South Korea) Racegraph (South Korea) Lamborghini Busan by Racegraph (South Korea) Lamborghini Bundang by Racegraph	77	(Macau) André Couto	PA	2
(South Korea) Racegraph (South Korea) Lamborghini Busan by Racegraph (South Korea) Lamborghini Bundang by Racegraph	77	(Malaysia) Chiow Teck Song	PA	5–6
(South Korea) Racegraph (South Korea) Lamborghini Busan by Racegraph (South Korea) Lamborghini Bundang by Racegraph	77	(Hong Kong) Tommy Ku Siu Lam	PA	5–6
(South Korea) SQDA-GRIT Motorsport	63	(South Korea) Yoon Jeon	Am	3–4
(South Korea) SQDA-GRIT Motorsport	63	(Indonesia) Umar Abdullah	Am	3
(South Korea) SQDA-GRIT Motorsport	63	(South Korea) Kevin Lee	Am	4–5
(South Korea) SQDA-GRIT Motorsport	63	(South Korea) Changwoo Lee	Am	4–5
(Malaysia) TKJ Motorsport	66	(Malaysia) Jonathan Xie	Am	1
(Malaysia) TKJ Motorsport	66	(Malaysia) Kwong Teck Sim	Am	1
(Hong Kong) Kamlung Racing	68	(Hong Kong) Bertram Lau	Am	All
(Hong Kong) Kamlung Racing	68	(Hong Kong) Mak Hing Tak	Am	5
(Thailand) Siamgas Corse	71	(Thailand) Supachai Weeraborwornpong	LC	All
True Visions Motorsports Thailand	78	(Thailand) Suttiluck Buncharoen	Am	All
(China) Climax Racing	95	(Finland) Elias Seppänen	PA	1
(China) Climax Racing	95	(China) Deng Pan	PA	1

Icon	Class
P	Pro Cup
PA	Pro-Am Cup
Am	Am Cup
LC	Lamborghini Cup
	Guest Starter

== Race results ==
Bold indicates the overall winner.

Round		Circuit	Pole position	Pro winners	Pro-Am winners	Am winners	LC Winners
1	R1	(Malaysia) Sepang	(Malaysia) No. 33 Batmobile Racing	(Malaysia) No. 33 Batmobile Racing	**(Italy) No. 98 VSR**	(Malaysia) No. 66 TKJ Motorsport	(Thailand) No. 71 Siamgas Corse
1	R1	(Malaysia) Sepang	(United Kingdom) William Tregurtha	(United Kingdom) William Tregurtha	**(Thailand) Todd Kingsford** **(New Zealand) Chris van der Drift**	(Malaysia) Jonathan Xie (Malaysia) Kwong Teck Sim	(Thailand) Supachai Weeraborwornpong
1	R2	(Malaysia) Sepang	(Malaysia) No. 33 Batmobile Racing	**(Italy) No. 6 VSR**	(Italy) No. 98 VSR	(Malaysia) No. 66 TKJ Motorsport	(Thailand) No. 71 Siamgas Corse
1	R2	(Malaysia) Sepang	(United Kingdom) William Tregurtha	**(New Zealand) Liam Sceats** **(Poland) Gustaw Wisniewski**	(Thailand) Todd Kingsford (New Zealand) Chris van der Drift	(Malaysia) Jonathan Xie (Malaysia) Kwong Teck Sim	(Thailand) Supachai Weeraborwornpong
2	R1	(China) Ningbo	(Malaysia) No. 3 Batmobile Racing	**(Malaysia) No. 3 Batmobile Racing**	(Italy) No. 98 VSR	No. 78 True Visions Motorsports Thailand	(Thailand) No. 71 Siamgas Corse
2	R1	(China) Ningbo	(United Kingdom) William Tregurtha (Monaco) Jonathan Cecotto	**(United Kingdom) William Tregurtha** **(Monaco) Jonathan Cecotto**	(Thailand) Todd Kingsford (New Zealand) Chris van der Drift	(Thailand) Suttiluck Buncharoen	(Thailand) Supachai Weeraborwornpong
2	R2	(China) Ningbo	(Italy) No. 98 VSR	**(Malaysia) No. 3 Batmobile Racing**	(Italy) No. 98 VSR	No. 78 True Visions Motorsports Thailand	(South Korea) No. 17 Racegraph
2	R2	(China) Ningbo	(Thailand) Todd Kingsford (New Zealand) Chris van der Drift	**(United Kingdom) William Tregurtha** **(Monaco) Jonathan Cecotto**	(Thailand) Todd Kingsford (New Zealand) Chris van der Drift	(Thailand) Suttiluck Buncharoen	(Malaysia) Eng Peng Goh (Hong Kong) Terence Tse
3	R1	(Japan) Fuji	(Italy) No. 98 VSR	**(Malaysia) No. 3 Batmobile Racing**	(Italy) No. 98 VSR	No. 78 True Visions Motorsports Thailand	(Thailand) No. 71 Siamgas Corse
3	R1	(Japan) Fuji	(Thailand) Todd Kingsford (New Zealand) Chris van der Drift	**(United Kingdom) William Tregurtha** **(Monaco) Jonathan Cecotto**	(Thailand) Todd Kingsford (New Zealand) Chris van der Drift	(Thailand) Suttiluck Buncharoen	(Thailand) Supachai Weeraborwornpong
3	R2	(Japan) Fuji	(Malaysia) No. 3 Batmobile Racing	**(Malaysia) No. 3 Batmobile Racing**	(Italy) No. 98 VSR	No. 78 True Visions Motorsports Thailand	(Thailand) No. 71 Siamgas Corse
3	R2	(Japan) Fuji	(United Kingdom) William Tregurtha (Monaco) Jonathan Cecotto	**(United Kingdom) William Tregurtha** **(Monaco) Jonathan Cecotto**	(Thailand) Todd Kingsford (New Zealand) Chris van der Drift	(Thailand) Suttiluck Buncharoen	(Thailand) Supachai Weeraborwornpong
4	R1	(South Korea) Inje	(Malaysia) No. 3 Batmobile Racing	**(Malaysia) No. 3 Batmobile Racing**	(Italy) No. 98 VSR	No. 78 True Visions Motorsports Thailand	(Thailand) No. 71 Siamgas Corse
4	R1	(South Korea) Inje	(United Kingdom) William Tregurtha (Monaco) Jonathan Cecotto	**(United Kingdom) William Tregurtha** **(Monaco) Jonathan Cecotto**	(Thailand) Todd Kingsford (New Zealand) Chris van der Drift	(Thailand) Suttiluck Buncharoen	(Thailand) Supachai Weeraborwornpong
4	R2	(South Korea) Inje	(Malaysia) No. 3 Batmobile Racing	**(Italy) No. 6 VSR**	(Italy) No. 98 VSR	No. 78 True Visions Motorsports Thailand	(Thailand) No. 71 Siamgas Corse
4	R2	(South Korea) Inje	(United Kingdom) William Tregurtha (Monaco) Jonathan Cecotto	**(New Zealand) Liam Sceats** **(Poland) Gustaw Wisniewski**	(Thailand) Todd Kingsford (New Zealand) Chris van der Drift	(Thailand) Suttiluck Buncharoen	(Thailand) Supachai Weeraborwornpong
5	R1	(China) Shanghai	(South Korea) No. 7 Lamborghini Bundang by Racegraph	**(South Korea) No. 7 Lamborghini Bundang by Racegraph**	(Italy) No. 98 VSR	No. 78 True Visions Motorsports Thailand	(Thailand) No. 71 Siamgas Corse
5	R1	(China) Shanghai	(China) Li Zhicong (United States) Titus Sherlock	**(China) Li Zhicong** **(United States) Titus Sherlock**	(Thailand) Todd Kingsford (New Zealand) Chris van der Drift	(Thailand) Suttiluck Buncharoen	(Thailand) Supachai Weeraborwornpong
5	R2	(China) Shanghai	(Malaysia) No. 3 Batmobile Racing	**(Italy) No. 6 VSR**	(Italy) No. 98 VSR	No. 78 True Visions Motorsports Thailand	(Thailand) No. 71 Siamgas Corse
5	R2	(China) Shanghai	(United Kingdom) William Tregurtha (Monaco) Jonathan Cecotto	**(New Zealand) Liam Sceats** **(Poland) Gustaw Wisniewski**	(Thailand) Todd Kingsford (New Zealand) Chris van der Drift	(Thailand) Suttiluck Buncharoen	(Thailand) Supachai Weeraborwornpong
6	R1	(Italy) Monza	(Italy) No. 6 VSR	**(Italy) No. 6 VSR**	(Italy) No. 98 VSR	No. 78 True Visions Motorsports Thailand	(Thailand) No. 71 Siamgas Corse
6	R1	(Italy) Monza	(New Zealand) Liam Sceats (Poland) Gustaw Wisniewski	**(New Zealand) Liam Sceats** **(Poland) Gustaw Wisniewski**	(Thailand) Todd Kingsford (New Zealand) Chris van der Drift	(Thailand) Suttiluck Buncharoen	(Thailand) Supachai Weeraborwornpong
6	R2	(Italy) Monza	(Italy) No. 98 VSR	**(South Korea) No. 7 Lamborghini Bundang by Racegraph**	(Italy) No. 98 VSR	No. 78 True Visions Motorsports Thailand	(Thailand) No. 71 Siamgas Corse
6	R2	(Italy) Monza	(Thailand) Todd Kingsford (New Zealand) Chris van der Drift	**(China) Li Zhicong** **(United States) Titus Sherlock**	(Thailand) Todd Kingsford (New Zealand) Chris van der Drift	(Thailand) Suttiluck Buncharoen	(Thailand) Supachai Weeraborwornpong

== Championship standings ==
=== Scoring system ===
Position	1st	2nd	3rd	4th	5th	6th	7th	8th	9th	10th	Pole
Points	15	12	10	8	6	5	4	3	2	1	1

=== Pro ===
Pos.	Driver	Team	(Malaysia) SEP		(China) NIN		(Japan) FUJ		(South Korea) INJ		(China) SHA		(Italy) MON		Pts
Pos.	Driver	Team	R1	R2	R1	R2	R1	R2	R1	R2	R1	R2	R1	R2	Pts
1	(United Kingdom) William Tregurtha	(Malaysia) Batmobile Racing	1	3	1	1	1	1	1	2	3	Ret	2	2	155
2	(New Zealand) Liam Sceats (Poland) Gustaw Wisniewski	(Italy) VSR	2	1	2	2	3	3	2	1	2	1	1	3	152
3	(Monaco) Jonathan Cecotto	(Malaysia) Batmobile Racing			1	1	1	1	1	2	3	Ret	2	2	128
4	(China) Li Zhicong (United States) Titus Sherlock	(South Korea) Lamborghini Bundang by Racegraph	Ret	2	3	3	2	2	3	Ret	1	2	3	1	119
Guest drivers ineligible for points
	(United States) Barrett Wolfe	(South Korea) Racegraph							4	3	4	3	4	4	
	(Macau) André Couto	(South Korea) Racegraph											4	4	
Pos.	Driver	Team	R1	R2	R1	R2	R1	R2	R1	R2	R1	R2	R1	R2	Pts
Pos.	Driver	Team	(Malaysia) SEP		(China) NIN		(Japan) FUJ		(South Korea) INJ		(China) SHA		(Italy) MON		Pts

=== Pro-Am ===
Pos.	Driver	Team	(Malaysia) SEP		(China) NIN		(Japan) FUJ		(South Korea) INJ		(China) SHA		(Italy) MON		Pts
Pos.	Driver	Team	R1	R2	R1	R2	R1	R2	R1	R2	R1	R2	R1	R2	Pts
1	(Thailand) Todd Kingsford (New Zealand) Chris van der Drift	(Italy) VSR	1	1	1	1	1	1	1	1	1	1	1	1	189
2	(Malaysia) Kumar Prabakaran (Malaysia) Putera Adam Halim Mu'azzam	(Malaysia) Batmobile Racing			3	3	2	3	2	2	2	2	2	2	117
3	(Macau) André Couto	(South Korea) Racegraph			2	2	3	2							25
3	(China) Zexuan Liu	(South Korea) Racegraph			2	2									25
Guest drivers ineligible for points
	(Finland) Elias Seppänen (China) Deng Pan	(China) Climax Racing	2	2											
	(Japan) Yugo Tanabe	(South Korea) Racegraph					3	2							
	(Malaysia) Chiow Teck Song (Hong Kong) Tommy Ku Siu Lam	(South Korea) Lamborghini Busan by Racegraph									3	Ret			
Pos.	Driver	Team	R1	R2	R1	R2	R1	R2	R1	R2	R1	R2	R1	R2	Pts
Pos.	Driver	Team	(Malaysia) SEP		(China) NIN		(Japan) FUJ		(South Korea) INJ		(China) SHA		(Italy) MON		Pts

=== Am ===
Pos.	Driver	Team	(Malaysia) SEP		(China) NIN		(Japan) FUJ		(South Korea) INJ		(China) SHA		(Italy) MON		Pts
Pos.	Driver	Team	R1	R2	R1	R2	R1	R2	R1	R2	R1	R2	R1	R2	Pts
1	(Thailand) Suttiluck Buncharoen	True Visions Motorsports Thailand	Ret	2	1	1	1	1	1	1	1	1	1	1	174
2	(Hong Kong) Bertram Lau	(Hong Kong) Kam Lung Racing	2	3	2	Ret	3	3	2	2	3	3	2	Ret	126
Guest drivers ineligible for points
	(South Korea) Yoon Jeon	(South Korea) SQDA-GRIT Motorsport					2	2	3	3					
	(South Korea) Kevin Lee	(South Korea) SQDA-GRIT Motorsport							3	3	2	2			
	(Malaysia) Jonathan Xie (Malaysia) Kwong Teck Sim	(Malaysia) TKJ Motorsport	1	1											
	(Indonesia) Umar Abdullah	(South Korea) SQDA-GRIT Motorsport					2	2							
	(South Korea) Changwoo Lee	(South Korea) SQDA-GRIT Motorsport									2	2			
	(Malaysia) Chiow Teck Song (Hong Kong) Tommy Ku Siu Lam	(South Korea) Lamborghini Busan by Racegraph											3	2	
	(Hong Kong) Mak Hing Tak	(Hong Kong) Kamlung Racing									3	3			
Pos.	Driver	Team	R1	R2	R1	R2	R1	R2	R1	R2	R1	R2	R1	R2	Pts
Pos.	Driver	Team	(Malaysia) SEP		(China) NIN		(Japan) FUJ		(South Korea) INJ		(China) SHA		(Italy) MON		Pts

=== Lamborghini Cup ===
Pos.	Driver	Team	(Malaysia) SEP		(China) NIN		(Japan) FUJ		(South Korea) INJ		(China) SHA		(Italy) MON		Pts
Pos.	Driver	Team	R1	R2	R1	R2	R1	R2	R1	R2	R1	R2	R1	R2	Pts
1	(Thailand) Supachai Weeraborwornpong	(Thailand) Siamgas Corse	1	1	1	Ret	1	1	1	1	1	1	1	1	176
2	(Malaysia) Eng Peng Goh (Hong Kong) Terence Tse	(South Korea) Lamborghini Bundang by Racegraph	2	Ret	2	1	2	2	3	3	2	2	2	3	130
3	(Chinese Taipei) Steven Chian	(South Korea) Lamborghini Busan by Racegraph	3	2			3	3	2	2			3	2	88
4	(South Korea) Kim Sang Ho	(South Korea) Lamborghini Busan by Racegraph	3	2					2	2			3	2	68
Pos.	Driver	Team	R1	R2	R1	R2	R1	R2	R1	R2	R1	R2	R1	R2	Pts
Pos.	Driver	Team	(Malaysia) SEP		(China) NIN		(Japan) FUJ		(South Korea) INJ		(China) SHA		(Italy) MON		Pts
