= Ben Green (racing driver) =

English racing driver (born 1998)

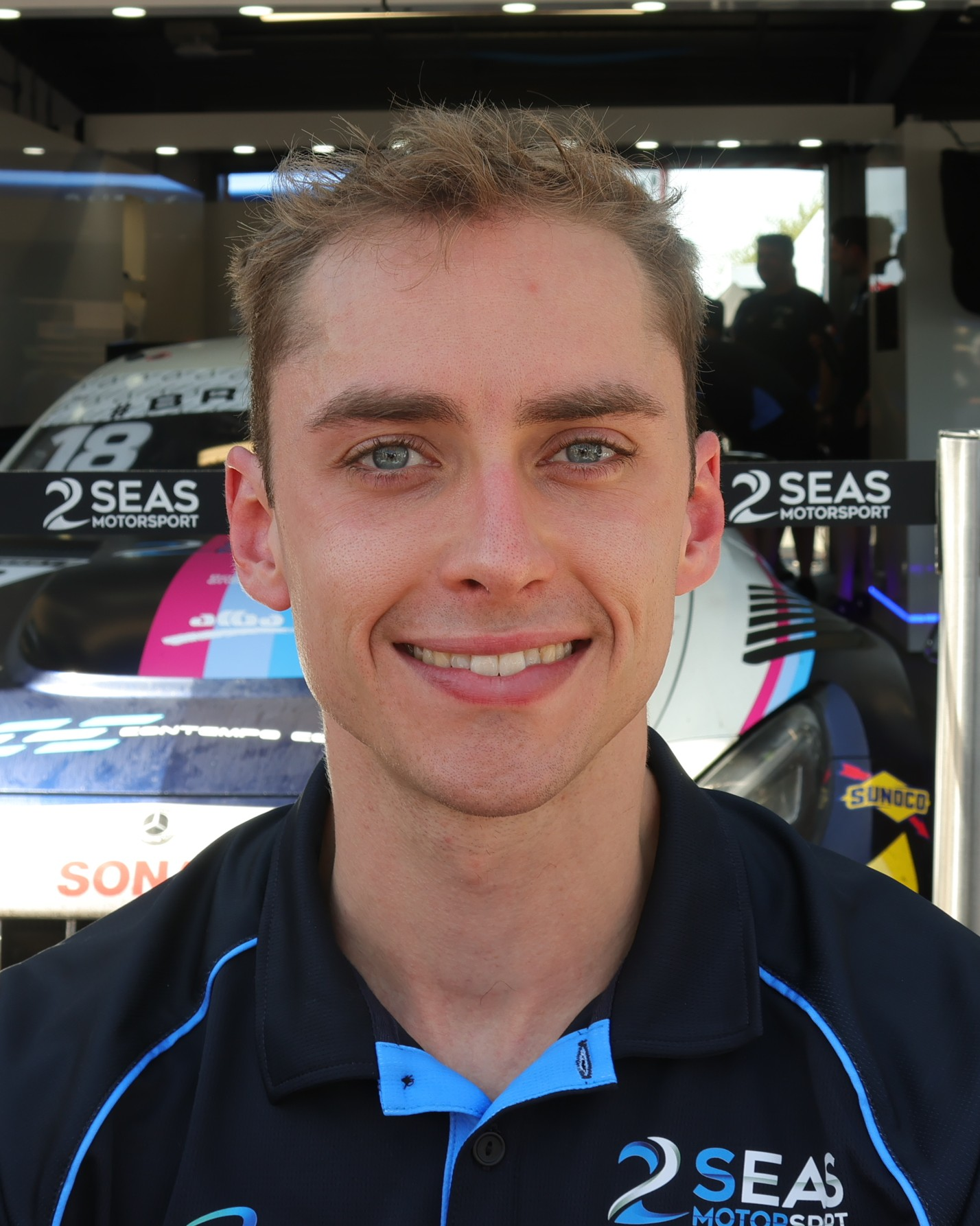
- Green at Oulton Park in 2026
- Nationality: (United Kingdom) British
- Born: Benjamin Green; 2 February 1998 (age 28) Waltham Abbey, Essex, England

GT World Challenge Europe Sprint Cup career
- Debut season: 2024
- Current team: Emil Frey Racing
- Categorisation: FIA Silver (until 2022); FIA Gold (2023–2024); FIA Platinum (2025–)
- Starts: 30 (30 entries)
- Wins: 3
- Podiums: 6
- Poles: 3
- Fastest laps: 1
- Best finish: 3rd in 2024

Previous series
- DTM - 2025 GT World Challenge Asia - 2025 ADAC GT Masters - 2022-2023 DTM Trophy - 2020-2021 British GT Championship - 2018-2029, 2026 Ginetta GT4 Supercup - 2016-2017 Ginetta Junior - 2015

Benjamin Green (born 2 February 1998) is an English racing driver. He has competed in the British GT Championship, DTM Trophy, ADAC GT Masters, Deutsche Tourenwagen Masters (DTM), and GT World Challenge Europe, among other championships.

== Career ==
Green began his car-racing career in the Ginetta Junior Championship before moving to the Ginetta GT4 Supercup. In 2017, driving for Century Motorsport, he won seven races and recorded 13 podium finishes, finishing second in the championship. He moved to the British GT Championship in 2018, competing in the GT4 class with Century Motorsport and finishing second in the GT4 standings.

Green moved into GT3 competition in 2019 with Century Motorsport, before joining FK Performance Motorsport in the DTM Trophy in 2020, where he finished fourth overall and won the championship's Junior classification. In 2021 he won the DTM Trophy championship, taking five race victories during the season.

For 2022, Green joined Schubert Motorsport in the ADAC GT Masters, driving a BMW M4 GT3 alongside Niklas Krütten. The pair won both races at the Red Bull Ring, while Green won the series' Pirelli Junior classification and finished seventh overall in the championship.

In 2024, Green joined Emil Frey Racing for the GT World Challenge Europe Sprint Cup, driving a Ferrari 296 GT3 alongside Konsta Lappalainen. He took pole position for the opening Sprint Cup race at Brands Hatch and subsequently won Race 2 at the Hockenheimring. Green and Lappalainen finished third in the Sprint Cup championship.

In 2025, Green competed in the DTM and GT World Challenge Europe, while also racing for Johor Motorsports Racing (JMR) in GT World Challenge Asia. In the latter championship, he shared a Chevrolet Corvette Z06 GT3.R with Prince Jefri Ibrahim and won at Chang International Circuit.

In 2026, Green continued with Emil Frey Racing in the GT World Challenge Europe Sprint Cup, sharing a Ferrari 296 GT3 Evo with Thierry Vermeulen. The pair won the second race at Zandvoort in September and the second race at Barcelona in October. He also joined Scherer Sport PHX for the Nürburgring 24 Hours programme. Driving an Audi R8 LMS GT3 alongside Christopher Haase and Alexander Sims, Green won the second race of the 2026 Nürburgring 24 Hours Qualifiers at the Nürburgring Nordschleife. The trio completed 28 laps and finished 28.024 seconds ahead of the Abt Lamborghini. Green also joined 2 Seas Motorsport for the British GT Championship.

Green, Haase and Sims subsequently entered the 2026 24 Hours of Nürburgring in the Scherer Sport PHX Audi. The car qualified third overall, placing it on the second row of the grid. Green took over the car after seven laps and later handed it to Sims. During the 17th lap, Sims was involved in a collision in the Pflanzgarten section following a sequence of conflicting flag signals, causing damage to the Audi's front chassis and forcing the car's retirement.

Green also joined 13 Autosport for the 2026 Rolex 24 at Daytona, sharing a Chevrolet Corvette Z06 GT3.R with Orey Fidani, Matt Bell and Lars Kern; the car finished fourth in the GTD class. He was also entered by TF Sport for the 2026 24 Hours of Le Mans, sharing the No. 2 Chevrolet Corvette Z06 GT3.R with Prince Jefri Ibrahim and Afiq Ikhwan Yazid.

== Racing record ==
=== Career summary ===
Season	Series	Team	Races	Wins	Poles	F/Laps	Podiums	Points	Position
2014	Ginetta Junior Winter Series	Supergreen	4	0	0	0	0	33	11th
2015	Ginetta Junior Championship	Super Green Racing	20	0	0	0	0	102	18th
2016	Ginetta GT4 Supercup	Super Green Racing	22	0	0	0	3	282	8th
2016	V de V Endurance Series - PFV	Century Motorsport	1	0	0	0	1	0	NC†
2017	Ginetta GT4 Supercup	Century Motorsport	23	7	2	1	13	528	**2nd**
2017	24H Series - SP3-GT4	Century Motorsport	1	0	0	0	1	28	**2nd**
2017	V de V Endurance Series - PFV	Century Motorsport	?	?	?	?	?	?	?
2017	British GT Championship - GT3	JRM Racing	1	0	0	0	0	15	15th
2018	British GT Championship - GT4	Century Motorsport	9	1	2	0	2	123	**2nd**
2019	British GT Championship - GT3	Century Motorsport	8	0	0	0	0	35.5	17th
2020	DTM Trophy	FK Performance	11	1	0	1	4	120	4th
2020	British GT Championship - GT4	Century Motorsport	1	0	0	0	1	27	13th
2021	DTM Trophy	FK Performance Motorsport	14	5	4	5	10	247	**1st**
2021	Nürburgring Langstrecken-Serie - VT2	FK Performance Motorsport	2	2	1	0	2	0	NC†
2022	ADAC GT Masters	Schubert Motorsport	14	2	0	2	2	118	7th
2022	24 Hours of Nürburgring - SP10	FK Performance Motorsport	1	1	0	0	1	N/A	**1st**
2023	ADAC GT Masters	Schubert Motorsport	12	0	0	1	3	136	7th
2023	GT World Challenge Europe Endurance Cup - Bronze	Walkenhorst Motorsport	1	0	0	0	0	4	31st
2023	24 Hours of Nürburgring - SP9 Pro-Am	PROsport Racing	1	0	0	0	1	N/A	**3rd**
2024	GT World Challenge Europe Sprint Cup	Emil Frey Racing	10	1	2	1	3	62.5	**3rd**
2024	GT World Challenge Europe Endurance Cup	Walkenhorst Racing	4	0	0	0	0	0	NC
2024	GT World Challenge Europe Endurance Cup - Bronze	Walkenhorst Racing	4	0	0	0	0	9	32nd
2024	24 Hours of Nürburgring - SP9	PROsport-Racing	1	0	0	0	0	N/A	DNF
2025	Deutsche Tourenwagen Masters	Emil Frey Racing	16	0	1	0	2	79	13th
2025	GT World Challenge Europe Sprint Cup	Emil Frey Racing	10	0	1	0	0	18.5	9th
2025	GT World Challenge Asia	Johor Motorsports Racing JMR	10	2	2	0	3	85	6th
2025–26	Asian Le Mans Series - GT	Johor Motorsports JMR	4	0	0	1	0	2	26th
2026	IMSA SportsCar Championship - GTD	13 Autosport	1	0	0	1	0	295	60th
2026	GT World Challenge Europe Sprint Cup	Emil Frey Racing	10	2	1	0	3	56.5	4th
2026	British GT Championship - GT3	2 Seas Motorsport	6	0	0	0	1	48	9th
2026	Nürburgring Langstrecken-Serie - SP9	Scherer Sport PHX							
2026	24 Hours of Nürburgring - SP9	Scherer Sport PHX	1	0	0	0	0	N/A	DNF
2026	GT World Challenge Europe Endurance Cup	Johor Motorsports Racing JMR	1	0	0	0	0	0	NC
2026	Intercontinental GT Challenge	Johor Motorsports Racing JMR	3	0	0	0	0	0	NC
2026	24 Hours of Le Mans - LMGT3	TF Sport	1	0	0	0	0	N/A	14th

^{†} As Green was a guest driver, he was ineligible for championship points.
^{*} Season still in progress.

=== Complete British GT Championship results ===
(key) (Races in bold indicate pole position) (Races in italics indicate fastest lap)

Year	Team	Car	Class	1	2	3	4	5	6	7	8	9	10	Pos.	Points
2017	JRM Racing	Nissan GT-R Nismo GT3	GT3	OUL; 1	OUL; 2	ROC; 1	SNE; 1	SNE; 2	SIL; 1	SPA; 1	SPA; 2	BRH; 1	DON; 1; 5	15th	15
2018	Century Motorsport	BMW M4 GT4	GT4	OUL; 1; 20	OUL; 2; 27	ROC; 1; 16	**SNE**; **1**; 17	SNE; 2; 11	SIL; 1; 18	SPA; 1; 14	BRH; 1; 9	**DON**; **1**; 17		2nd	123
2019	Century Motorsport	BMW M6 GT3	GT3	OUL; 1; 5	OUL; 2; 5	SNE; 1; 9	SNE; 2; 7	SIL; 1 Ret	DON; 1; 8	SPA; 1; 10	BRH; 1 Ret	DON; 1 Ret		17th	35.5
2020	Century Motorsport	BMW M4 GT4	GT4	OUL; 1	OUL; 2	DON; 1	DON; 2	BRH; 1; 14	DON; 1	SNE; 1	SNE; 2	SIL; 1		13th	27
2026	2 Seas Motorsport	Mercedes-AMG GT3 Evo	GT3	SIL; 1 Ret	OUL; 1; 6	OUL; 2; 3	SPA; 1; 5	SNE; 1; 8	SNE; 2; 7	DON; 1	BRH; 1			9th	48

=== Complete ADAC GT Masters results ===
(key) (Races in bold indicate pole position) (Races in italics indicate fastest lap)

Year	Team	Car	1	2	3	4	5	6	7	8	9	10	11	12	13	14	DC	Points
2022	Schubert Motorsport	BMW M4 GT3	OSC; 1; 10	OSC; 2; 16	RBR; 1; 1^{3}	**RBR**; **2**; 1^{1}	ZAN; 1; 18†	ZAN; 2; 11	NÜR; 1; 10	NÜR; 2; 11^{2}	LAU; 1; 11	LAU; 2; 9	SAC; 1; 13	SAC; 2; 8	HOC; 1; 7	HOC; 2; 9	7th	118
2023	Schubert Motorsport	BMW M4 GT3	HOC; 1; 2	HOC; 2; 4	NOR; 1; 9	NOR; 2; 9	NÜR; 1; 8	NÜR; 2; 6^{2}	SAC; 1; 2	SAC; 2; 4	RBR; 1; 2	RBR; 2; 9	HOC; 1; 7	HOC; 2 Ret			7th	136

=== Complete GT World Challenge Europe results ===
==== GT World Challenge Europe Endurance Cup ====
(key) (Races in bold indicate pole position) (Races in italics indicate fastest lap)

Year	Team	Car	Class	1	2	3	4	5	6	7	Pos.	Points
2023	Walkenhorst Motorsport	BMW M4 GT3	Bronze	MNZ	LEC	SPA; 6H	SPA; 12H	SPA; 24H	NÜR	CAT; 30	31st	4
2024	Walkenhorst Racing	Aston Martin Vantage AMR GT3 Evo	Bronze	LEC; 36	SPA; 6H; 23	SPA; 12H; 31	SPA; 24H; Ret	NÜR; 42	MNZ; Ret	JED; WD	32nd	9
2026	Johor Motorsports Racing JMR	Chevrolet Corvette Z06 GT3.R	Pro-Am	LEC	MNZ	SPA; 6H; 51	SPA; 12H; 38	SPA; 24H; 29	NÜR	ALG	NC	0

==== GT World Challenge Europe Sprint Cup ====
(key) (Races in bold indicate pole position) (Races in italics indicate fastest lap)

Year	Team	Car	Class	1	2	3	4	5	6	7	8	9	10	Pos.	Points
2024	Emil Frey Racing	Ferrari 296 GT3	Pro	**BRH**; **1**; 2	BRH; 2; 5	MIS; 1; 4	MIS; 2; 7	HOC; 1; 3	HOC; 2; 1	**MAG**; **1**; 5	MAG; 2; 13	CAT; 1; 4	CAT; 2; 12	3rd	62.5
2025	Emil Frey Racing	Ferrari 296 GT3	Pro	BRH; 1; 4	BRH; 2; 5	ZAN; 1 Ret	**ZAN**; **2**; 11	MIS; 1; 8	MIS; 2; 15	MAG; 1; 8	MAG; 2; 13	VAL; 1; 12	VAL; 2 Ret	9th	18.5
2026	Emil Frey Racing	Ferrari 296 GT3 Evo	Pro	BRH; 1; 10	BRH; 2; 11	MIS; 1; 4	MIS; 2; 5	MAG; 1; 15	MAG; 2 Ret	ZAN; 1; 3	ZAN; 2; 1	CAT; 1 Ret	**CAT**; **2**; 1	4th	56.5

^{*}Season still in progress.

=== Complete Deutsche Tourenwagen Masters results ===
(key) (Races in bold indicate pole position) (Races in italics indicate fastest lap)

Year	Entrant	Chassis	1	2	3	4	5	6	7	8	9	10	11	12	13	14	15	16	Rank	Points
2025	Emil Frey Racing	Ferrari 296 GT3	OSC; 1; 18	OSC; 2; 15	LAU; 1; 10	LAU; 2 Ret	ZAN; 1; 15	ZAN; 2; 17	NOR; 1 Ret	NOR; 2; 6	NÜR; 1; 2	NÜR; 2; 15	SAC; 1 Ret^{3}	SAC; 2; 3	RBR; 1; 4	RBR; 2 Ret	**HOC**; **1**; 10^{1}	HOC; 2 Ret^{3}	13th	79

=== Complete Asian Le Mans Series results ===
(key) (Races in bold indicate pole position) (Races in italics indicate fastest lap)

Year	Entrant	Class	Chassis	1	2	3	4	5	6	Rank	Points
2025–26	Johor Motorsports JMR	GT	Chevrolet Corvette Z06 GT3.R	SEP; 1; 9	SEP; 2; 12	DUB; 1; 13	DUB; 2; 11	ABU; 1 WD	ABU; 2 WD	26th	2

=== Complete IMSA SportsCar Championship results ===
(key) (Races in bold indicate pole position) (Races in italics indicate fastest lap)

Year	Entrant	Class	Chassis	Engine	1	2	3	4	5	6	7	8	9	10	Pos.	Points
2026	13 Autosport	GTD	Chevrolet Corvette Z06 GT3.R	Chevrolet LT6 5.5 L V8	DAY; 4	SEB	LBH	LGA	WGL	MOS	ELK	VIR	IMS	PET	60th	295

=== Complete 24 Hours of Le Mans results ===
Year	Team	Co-Drivers	Car	Class	Laps	Pos.	Class Pos.
2026	(United Kingdom) TF Sport	(United Kingdom) Lorcan Hanafin (Malaysia) Prince Jefri Ibrahim	Chevrolet Corvette Z06 GT3.R	LMGT3	330	46th	14th
