= 2018 International GT Open =

The 2018 International GT Open was the thirteenth season of the International GT Open, the grand tourer-style sports car racing founded in 2006 by the Spanish GT Sport Organización. It began on 14 April at Estoril and finished on 21 October, at Barcelona after seven double-header meetings.

== Entry list ==
Team	Car	No.	Drivers	Class	Rounds
(Spain) BMW Team Teo Martín	BMW M6 GT3	3	(Argentina) Juan Cruz Álvarez	P	All
(Spain) BMW Team Teo Martín	BMW M6 GT3	3	(Portugal) Lourenço Beirão da Veiga	P	All
(Spain) BMW Team Teo Martín	BMW M6 GT3	7	(Brazil) Márcio Basso	Am	All
(Spain) BMW Team Teo Martín	BMW M6 GT3	7	(Brazil) Thiago Marques	Am	1–4
(Spain) BMW Team Teo Martín	BMW M6 GT3	7	(Ukraine) Aleksey Chuklin	Am	5
(Spain) BMW Team Teo Martín	BMW M6 GT3	7	(Brazil) Guilherme Salas	Am	6–7
(Spain) BMW Team Teo Martín	BMW M6 GT3	47	(Spain) Fran Rueda	P	All
(Spain) BMW Team Teo Martín	BMW M6 GT3	47	(Guatemala) Andrés Saravia	P	All
(Poland) Olimp Racing	Audi R8 LMS	5	(Poland) Stanislaw Jedlinski	Am	4, 7
(Poland) Olimp Racing	Audi R8 LMS	5	(Poland) Malgorzata Rdest	Am	7
(Poland) Olimp Racing	Audi R8 LMS	77	(Poland) Marcin Jedlinski	PA	4, 7
(Poland) Olimp Racing	Audi R8 LMS	77	(Poland) Mateusz Lisowski	PA	4, 7
(Italy) Vincenzo Sospiri Racing	Lamborghini Huracán GT3	6	(China) Kang Ling	P	All
(Italy) Vincenzo Sospiri Racing	Lamborghini Huracán GT3	6	(Brazil) Nicolas Costa	P	1–2, 6
(Italy) Vincenzo Sospiri Racing	Lamborghini Huracán GT3	6	(Italy) Edoardo Liberati	P	3–5
(Italy) Vincenzo Sospiri Racing	Lamborghini Huracán GT3	6	(United Kingdom) Phil Keen	P	7
(Italy) Vincenzo Sospiri Racing	Lamborghini Huracán GT3	66	(Brazil) Giulio Borlenghi	Am	All
(Italy) Vincenzo Sospiri Racing	Lamborghini Huracán GT3	66	(Poland) Andrzej Lewandowski	Am	All
(Japan) Honda Racing Team JAS	Honda NSX GT3	8	(Belgium) Bertrand Baguette	P	6
(Japan) Honda Racing Team JAS	Honda NSX GT3	8	(Argentina) Esteban Guerrieri	P	6
(Slovakia) ARC Bratislava by VSR	Lamborghini Huracán GT3	9	(Slovakia) Miro Konôpka	Am	1–6
(Slovakia) ARC Bratislava by VSR	Lamborghini Huracán GT3	9	(Latvia) Konstantīns Calko	Am	1–3
(Slovakia) ARC Bratislava by VSR	Lamborghini Huracán GT3	9	(Slovakia) Zdeno Mikulasko	Am	4, 6
(Slovakia) ARC Bratislava by VSR	Lamborghini Huracán GT3	9	(United Kingdom) Darren Burke	Am	5
(Italy) RS Racing	Ferrari 488 GT3	11	(Italy) Daniele di Amato	P	All
(Italy) RS Racing	Ferrari 488 GT3	11	(Italy) Andrea Montermini	P	1–3, 5–7
(Italy) RS Racing	Ferrari 488 GT3	11	(Italy) Andrea Bertolini	P	4
(Italy) Ombra Racing	Lamborghini Huracán GT3	12	(Italy) Damiano Fioravanti	P	All
(Italy) Ombra Racing	Lamborghini Huracán GT3	12	(Brazil) Fernando Rees	P	1–4
(Italy) Ombra Racing	Lamborghini Huracán GT3	12	(Italy) Alex Frasinetti	P	5
(Italy) Ombra Racing	Lamborghini Huracán GT3	12	(Italy) Stefano Gattuso	P	6
(Italy) Ombra Racing	Lamborghini Huracán GT3	12	(Italy) Andrea Rizzoli	P	7
(Spain) Drivex School	Mercedes-AMG GT3	16	(Brazil) Marcelo Hahn	PA	All
(Spain) Drivex School	Mercedes-AMG GT3	16	(Brazil) Allam Khodair	PA	1, 3–5, 7
(Spain) Drivex School	Mercedes-AMG GT3	16	(Brazil) Allan Hellmeister	PA	2, 6
(Spain) Drivex School	Mercedes-AMG GT3	36	(Austria) Lucas Auer	PA	7
(Spain) Drivex School	Mercedes-AMG GT3	36	(Brazil) Christian Hahn	PA	7
(Spain) Drivex School	Mercedes-AMG GT3	41	(Brazil) Ricardo Baptista	PA	4–6
(Spain) Drivex School	Mercedes-AMG GT3	41	(Brazil) Cacá Bueno	PA	4–5
(Spain) Drivex School	Mercedes-AMG GT3	41	(Portugal) Duarte Félix da Costa	PA	6
(Spain) Drivex School	Mercedes-AMG GT3	62	(United Kingdom) Jamie Campbell-Walter	P	1
(Spain) Drivex School	Mercedes-AMG GT3	62	(Austria) Ferdinand Habsburg	P	1
(Czech Republic) Senkyr Motorsport	BMW M6 GT3	17	(Slovakia) Richard Gonda	P	3, 7
(Czech Republic) Senkyr Motorsport	BMW M6 GT3	17	(Sweden) Joel Eriksson	P	3
(Czech Republic) Senkyr Motorsport	BMW M6 GT3	17	(Denmark) Mikkel Jensen	P	7
(Italy) Imperiale Racing	Lamborghini Huracán GT3	19	(Italy) Raffaele Giammaria	PA	All
(Italy) Imperiale Racing	Lamborghini Huracán GT3	19	(China) Liang Jiatong	PA	All
(Italy) Imperiale Racing	Lamborghini Huracán GT3	25	(Italy) Riccardo Agostini	P	All
(Italy) Imperiale Racing	Lamborghini Huracán GT3	25	(Netherlands) Rik Breukers	P	All
(Italy) Imperiale Racing	Lamborghini Huracán GT3	63	(Netherlands) Jeroen Mul	P	All
(Italy) Imperiale Racing	Lamborghini Huracán GT3	63	(Italy) Giovanni Venturini	P	All
(Germany) SPS Automotive Performance	Mercedes-AMG GT3	20	(United Kingdom) Tom Onslow-Cole	PA	All
(Germany) SPS Automotive Performance	Mercedes-AMG GT3	20	(Germany) Valentin Pierburg	PA	All
(Italy) Krypton Motorsport	Mercedes-AMG GT3	24	(Italy) Mario Cordoni	Am	1
(Italy) Krypton Motorsport	Mercedes-AMG GT3	24	(Italy) Marco Zanuttini	Am	1
(United Kingdom) Team Parker Racing	Bentley Continental GT3	24	(United Kingdom) Ian Loggie	PA	5
(United Kingdom) Team Parker Racing	Bentley Continental GT3	24	(United Kingdom) Callum MacLeod	PA	5
(Italy) Daiko Lazarus Racing	Lamborghini Huracán GT3	27	(Italy) Fabrizio Crestani	PA	All
(Italy) Daiko Lazarus Racing	Lamborghini Huracán GT3	27	(Portugal) Miguel Ramos	PA	All
(Italy) Daiko Lazarus Racing	Lamborghini Huracán GT3	28	(Italy) Giuseppe Cipriani	PA	All
(Italy) Daiko Lazarus Racing	Lamborghini Huracán GT3	28	(United Kingdom) Toby Sowery	PA	All
(Germany) Rinaldi Racing	Ferrari 488 GT3	33	(Germany) Christian Hook	Am	2–4
(Germany) Rinaldi Racing	Ferrari 488 GT3	33	(Germany) Steve Parrow	Am	2–4
(Germany) Rinaldi Racing	Ferrari 488 GT3	33	(Germany) Steve Parrow	PA	5
(Germany) Rinaldi Racing	Ferrari 488 GT3	33	(Germany) Christian Hook	PA	6–7
(Germany) Rinaldi Racing	Ferrari 488 GT3	33	(Germany) Daniel Keilwitz	PA	5
(Germany) Rinaldi Racing	Ferrari 488 GT3	33	(Germany) Dominik Schwager	PA	6–7
(Germany) Rinaldi Racing	Ferrari 488 GT3	333	(South Africa) David Perel	PA	2–7
(Germany) Rinaldi Racing	Ferrari 488 GT3	333	(Russia) Vadim Kogay	PA	2–3
(Germany) Rinaldi Racing	Ferrari 488 GT3	333	(Russia) Rinat Salikhov	PA	4–7
(Germany) Rinaldi Racing	Ferrari 488 GT3	993	(Russia) Rinat Salikhov	Am	3
(United States) Luzich Racing	Ferrari 488 GT3	51	(Italy) Alessandro Pier Guidi	P	All
(United States) Luzich Racing	Ferrari 488 GT3	51	(Denmark) Mikkel Mac	P	All
(United States) Luzich Racing	Ferrari 488 GT3	52	(Italy) Marco Cioci	P	3–5, 7
(United States) Luzich Racing	Ferrari 488 GT3	52	(Republic of Ireland) Matt Griffin	P	3, 7
(United States) Luzich Racing	Ferrari 488 GT3	52	(Brazil) Daniel Serra	P	4–5
(United States) Luzich Racing	Ferrari 488 GT3	52	(Italy) Eddie Cheever III	PA	6
(United States) Luzich Racing	Ferrari 488 GT3	52	(Denmark) Nicklas Nielsen	PA	6
(United States) Luzich Racing	Ferrari 488 GT3	71	(Italy) Michele Rugolo	PA	All
(United States) Luzich Racing	Ferrari 488 GT3	71	(Sweden) Alexander West	PA	All
(Austria) Lechner Racing	Mercedes-AMG GT3	72	(Germany) Thomas Jäger	PA	2, 6–7
(Austria) Lechner Racing	Mercedes-AMG GT3	72	(Austria) Mario Plachutta	PA	2, 6–7
(Austria) HTP Motorsport / MS Racing	Mercedes-AMG GT3	74	(Austria) Alexander Hrachowina	Am	1–6
(Austria) HTP Motorsport / MS Racing	Mercedes-AMG GT3	74	(Austria) Martin Konrad	Am	1–6
(Germany) Winward Racing / HTP Motorsport	Mercedes-AMG GT3	84	(Netherlands) Indy Dontje	P	7
(Germany) Winward Racing / HTP Motorsport	Mercedes-AMG GT3	84	(United States) Russell Ward	P	7
(Italy) Target Racing	Lamborghini Huracán GT3	90	(Italy) Alberto Di Folco	PA	2–5
(Italy) Target Racing	Lamborghini Huracán GT3	90	(Italy) Stefano Costantini	PA	2–5
(Italy) Target Racing	Lamborghini Huracán GT3	90	(Italy) Alberto Di Folco	P	6–7
(Italy) Target Racing	Lamborghini Huracán GT3	90	(Italy) Loris Spinelli	P	6
(Italy) Target Racing	Lamborghini Huracán GT3	90	(Switzerland) Adrian Zaugg	P	7
(Italy) Target Racing	Lamborghini Huracán GT3	91	(Italy) Stefano Constantini	Am	6–7
(Italy) Target Racing	Lamborghini Huracán GT3	91	(Belgium) Bernard Delhez	Am	6
(Italy) Target Racing	Lamborghini Huracán GT3	91	(Switzerland) Christoph Lenz	Am	7
(United Kingdom) Optimum Motorsport	Audi R8 LMS	96	(United Kingdom) Bradley Ellis	PA	1, 3–7
(United Kingdom) Optimum Motorsport	Audi R8 LMS	96	(United Kingdom) Oliver Wilkinson	PA	1, 3–7
(Portugal) Sports and You	Mercedes-AMG GT3	99	(Portugal) "Manuel da Costa" (Note: António Coimbra sometimes uses pseudonym "Manuel da Costa".)	Am	1–4, 7
(Portugal) Sports and You	Mercedes-AMG GT3	99	(Portugal) "Miguel Sardinha" (Note: Luís Silva sometimes uses pseudonym "Miguel Sardinha".)	Am	1–4, 7
(Spain) Porteiro Motorsport	Mercedes-AMG GT3	111	(United States) Phillippe Denes	Am	7
(Spain) Porteiro Motorsport	Mercedes-AMG GT3	111	(United States) Charles Finelli	Am	7
(Belgium) Aston Martin Brussels Racing	Aston Martin V12 Vantage GT3	100	(Belgium) Wolfgang Reip	P	3
(Belgium) Aston Martin Brussels Racing	Aston Martin V12 Vantage GT3	100	(Belgium) Tim Verbergt	P	3

Icon	Class
P	Pro Cup
PA	Pro-Am Cup
Am	Am Cup

== Race calendar ==
A seven-round provisional calendar was revealed on 30 September 2017. The schedule will feature the same seven European circuits, with the order of Le Castellet and Spa swapped. Bold indicates overall winner.

Round		Circuit	Date	Pole position	Pro Winner	Pro-Am Winner	Am Winner
1	R1	(Portugal) Autódromo Fernanda Pires da Silva	14 April	(United States) No. 51 Luzich Racing	**(United States) No. 51 Luzich Racing**	(Germany) No. 20 SPS Automotive Performance	(Portugal) No. 99 Sports and You
1	R1	(Portugal) Autódromo Fernanda Pires da Silva	14 April	(Italy) Alessandro Pier Guidi (Denmark) Mikkel Mac	**(Italy) Alessandro Pier Guidi** **(Denmark) Mikkel Mac**	(United Kingdom) Tom Onslow-Cole (Germany) Valentin Pierburg	(Portugal) António Coimbra (Portugal) Luís Silva
1	R2	(Portugal) Autódromo Fernanda Pires da Silva	15 April	(Italy) No. 28 Daiko Lazarus Racing	**(United States) No. 51 Luzich Racing**	(Spain) No. 16 Drivex School	(Italy) No. 66 Vincenzo Sospiri Racing
1	R2	(Portugal) Autódromo Fernanda Pires da Silva	15 April	(Italy) Giuseppe Cipriani (United Kingdom) Toby Sowery	**(Italy) Alessandro Pier Guidi** **(Denmark) Mikkel Mac**	(Brazil) Marcello Hahn (Brazil) Allam Khodair	(Brazil) Giulio Borlenghi (Poland) Andrzej Lewandowski
2	R1	(France) Circuit Paul Ricard, Le Castellet	5 May	(United States) No. 71 Luzich Racing	**(Spain) No. 47 BMW Team Teo Martín**	(Germany) No. 20 SPS Automotive Performance	(Austria) No. 74 HTP Motorsport / MS Racing
2	R1	(France) Circuit Paul Ricard, Le Castellet	5 May	(Italy) Michele Rugolo (Sweden) Alexander West	**(Spain) Fran Rueda** **(Guatemala) Andrés Saravia**	(United Kingdom) Tom Onslow-Cole (Germany) Valentin Pierburg	(Austria) Alexander Hrachowina (Austria) Martin Konrad
2	R2	(France) Circuit Paul Ricard, Le Castellet	6 May	(Austria) No. 72 Lechner Racing	**(Italy) No. 11 RS Racing**	(Spain) No. 16 Drivex School	(Slovakia) No. 9 ARC Bratislava by VSR
2	R2	(France) Circuit Paul Ricard, Le Castellet	6 May	(Germany) Thomas Jäger (Austria) Mario Plachutta	**(Italy) Daniele di Amato** **(Italy) Andrea Montermini**	(Brazil) Marcello Hahn (Brazil) Alan Hellmeister	(Latvia) Konstantīns Calko (Slovakia) Miro Konôpka
3	R1	(Belgium) Circuit de Spa-Francorchamps	9 June	(Germany) No. 333 Rinaldi Racing	(United States) **No. 51 Luzich Racing**	(Germany) No. 20 SPS Automotive Performance	(Italy) No. 66 Vincenzo Sospiri Racing
3	R1	(Belgium) Circuit de Spa-Francorchamps	9 June	(Russia) Vadim Kogay (South Africa) David Perel	**(Italy) Alessandro Pier Guidi** **(Denmark) Mikkel Mac**	(United Kingdom) Tom Onslow-Cole (Germany) Valentin Pierburg	(Brazil) Giulio Borlenghi (Poland) Andrzej Lewandowski
3	R2	(Belgium) Circuit de Spa-Francorchamps	10 June	(Spain) No. 47 BMW Team Teo Martín	(Spain) **No. 47 BMW Team Teo Martín**	(United Kingdom) No. 96 Optimum Motorsport	(Germany) No. 993 Rinaldi Racing
3	R2	(Belgium) Circuit de Spa-Francorchamps	10 June	(Spain) Fran Rueda (Guatemala) Andrés Saravia	**(Spain) Fran Rueda** **(Guatemala) Andrés Saravia**	(United Kingdom) Bradley Ellis (United Kingdom) Oliver Wilkinson	(Russia) Rinat Salikhov
4	R1	(Hungary) Hungaroring	7 July	(United States) No. 52 Luzich Racing	(United States) **No. 52 Luzich Racing**	(Germany) No. 20 SPS Automotive Performance	(Austria) No. 74 HTP Motorsport / MS Racing
4	R1	(Hungary) Hungaroring	7 July	(Italy) Marco Cioci (Brazil) Daniel Serra	**(Italy) Marco Cioci** **(Brazil) Daniel Serra**	(United Kingdom) Tom Onslow-Cole (Germany) Valentin Pierburg	(Austria) Alexander Hrachowina (Austria) Martin Konrad
4	R2	(Hungary) Hungaroring	8 July	(Spain) No. 16 Drivex School	(Italy) No. 25 Imperiale Racing	(Spain) **No. 16 Drivex School**	(Italy) No. 66 Vincenzo Sospiri Racing
4	R2	(Hungary) Hungaroring	8 July	(Brazil) Marcello Hahn (Brazil) Allam Khodair	(Italy) Riccardo Agostini (Netherlands) Rik Breukers	**(Brazil) Marcello Hahn** **(Brazil) Allam Khodair**	(Brazil) Giulio Borlenghi (Poland) Andrzej Lewandowski
5	R1	(United Kingdom) Silverstone Circuit	1 September	(United States) No. 52 Luzich Racing	**(United States) No. 52 Luzich Racing**	(United Kingdom) No. 96 Optimum Motorsport	(Italy) No. 66 Vincenzo Sospiri Racing
5	R1	(United Kingdom) Silverstone Circuit	1 September	(Italy) Marco Cioci (Brazil) Daniel Serra	**(Italy) Marco Cioci** **(Brazil) Daniel Serra**	(United Kingdom) Bradley Ellis (United Kingdom) Oliver Wilkinson	(Brazil) Giulio Borlenghi (Poland) Andrzej Lewandowski
5	R2	(United Kingdom) Silverstone Circuit	2 September	(Germany) No. 20 SPS Automotive Performance	(Italy) No. 63 Imperiale Racing	(Germany) No. 20 SPS Automotive Performance	(Italy) No. 66 Vincenzo Sospiri Racing
5	R2	(United Kingdom) Silverstone Circuit	2 September	(United Kingdom) Tom Onslow-Cole (Germany) Valentin Pierburg	(Italy) Giovanni Venturini (Netherlands) Jeroen Mul	(United Kingdom) Tom Onslow-Cole (Germany) Valentin Pierburg	(Brazil) Giulio Borlenghi (Poland) Andrzej Lewandowski
6	R1	(Italy) Autodromo Nazionale Monza	22 September	(Italy) No. 11 RS Racing	(Spain) No. 47 BMW Team Teo Martín	(United States) No. 52 Luzich Racing	(Spain) No. 7 BMW Team Teo Martín
6	R1	(Italy) Autodromo Nazionale Monza	22 September	(Italy) Daniele di Amato (Italy) Andrea Montermini	(Spain) Fran Rueda (Guatemala) Andrés Saravia	(Italy) Eddie Cheever III (Denmark) Nicklas Nielsen	(Brazil) Márcio Basso (Brazil) Guilherme Salas
6	R2	(Italy) Autodromo Nazionale Monza	23 September	(Spain) No. 47 BMW Team Teo Martín	(United States) **No. 51 Luzich Racing**	(Italy) No. 19 Imperiale Racing	(Spain) No. 7 BMW Team Teo Martín
6	R2	(Italy) Autodromo Nazionale Monza	23 September	(Spain) Fran Rueda (Guatemala) Andrés Saravia	**(Italy) Alessandro Pier Guidi** **(Denmark) Mikkel Mac**	(Italy) Raffaele Giammaria (China) Liang Jiatong	(Brazil) Márcio Basso (Brazil) Guilherme Salas
7	R1	(Spain) Circuit de Barcelona-Catalunya	20 October	(Germany) No. 20 SPS Automotive Performance	(Italy) **No. 12 Ombra Racing**	(Germany) No. 20 SPS Automotive Performance	(Italy) No. 91 Target Racing
7	R1	(Spain) Circuit de Barcelona-Catalunya	20 October	(United Kingdom) Tom Onslow-Cole (Germany) Valentin Pierburg	**(Italy) Damiano Fioravanti** **(Italy) Andrea Rizzoli**	(United Kingdom) Tom Onslow-Cole (Germany) Valentin Pierburg	(Italy) Stefano Costantini
7	R2	(Spain) Circuit de Barcelona-Catalunya	21 October	(Spain) No. 47 BMW Team Teo Martín	(Italy) **No. 25 Imperiale Racing**	(Spain) No. 36 Drivex School	(Italy) No. 91 Target Racing
7	R2	(Spain) Circuit de Barcelona-Catalunya	21 October	(Spain) Fran Rueda (Guatemala) Andrés Saravia	**(Italy) Riccardo Agostini** **(Netherlands) Rik Breukers**	(Austria) Lucas Auer (Brazil) Christian Hahn	(Italy) Stefano Costantini

== Championship standings ==
=== Overall ===
Pos	Driver	EST (Portugal)		LEC (France)		SPA (Belgium)		HUN (Hungary)		SIL (United Kingdom)		MNZ (Italy)		CAT (Spain)		Total
1	(Denmark) Mikkel Mac	1	1	3	5	1	6	5	21	5	4	5	1	6	2	124
2	(Guatemala) Andrés Saravia (Spain) Fran Rueda	4	Ret	1	3	5	1	8	6	3	6	1	2	12	4	114
3	(Italy) Alessandro Pier Guidi	1	1			1	6	5	21	5	4	5	1	6	2	108
4	(Netherlands) Jeroen Mul (Italy) Giovanni Venturini	2	2	23	19	2	5	Ret	5	2	2	Ret	3	2	17	94
5	(Italy) Riccardo Agostini (Netherlands) Rik Breukers	Ret	3	12	16	3	9	4	2	9	5	3	5	4	1	89
6	(Italy) Damiano Fioravanti	7	6	2	4	Ret	Ret	Ret	4	4	3	4	Ret	1	Ret	78
7	(Italy) Daniele Di Amato	3	5	11	1	11	3	6	12	6	7	2	7	11	16	71
8	(Italy) Andrea Montermini	3	5	11	1	11	3			6	7	2	7	11	16	66
9	(Italy) Marco Cioci			3	5	6	11	1	11	1	10			7	9	59
10	(United Kingdom) Tom Onslow-Cole (Germany) Valentin Pierburg	5	13	5	Ret	9	12	2	19	23	1	17	17	3	8	55
11	(China) Kang Ling	6	4	7	7	8	4	Ret	3	12	11	10	18	13	7	48
12	(Brazil) Fernando Rees	7	6	2	4	Ret	Ret	Ret	4							37
13	(Slovakia) Richard Gonda					4	2							5	5	34
14	(Argentina) Juan Cruz Álvarez (Portugal) Lourenço Beirão da Veiga	9	8	4	2	Ret	7	Ret	Ret	10	Ret	23	8	14	Ret	33
15	(Brazil) Daniel Serra							1	11	1	10					31
16	(Italy) Fabrizio Crestani (Portugal) Miguel Ramos	8	9	8	8	10	15	3	13	13	8	15	12	9	11	28
17	(Brazil) Marcelo Hahn	Ret	7	13	6	17	10	10	1	16	23	13	11	17	12	26
18	(Brazil) Nicolas Costa	6	4	7	7							10	18			22
19	(Brazil) Allam Khodair	Ret	7			17	10	10	1	16	23			17	12	21
20	(Italy) Edoardo Liberati					8	4	Ret	3	12	11					21
21	(Sweden) Joel Eriksson					4	2									20
22	(Italy) Alex Frassineti									4	3					18
23	(United Kingdom) Bradley Ellis (United Kingdom) Oliver Wilkinson	14	15			12	8	11	10	7	13	Ret	Ret	23	6	14
24	(Italy) Alberto Di Folco			9	18	14	13	Ret	Ret	15	9	11	4	Ret	26	12
25	(Italy) Michele Rugolo (Sweden) Alexander West	11	10	6	17	Ret	16	14	7	22	12	22	22	21	24	10
26	(Belgium) Bertrand Baguette (Argentina) Esteban Guerrieri											7	6			9
27	(Italy) Loris Spinelli											11	4			8
28	(Italy) Stefano Gattuso											4	Ret			8
29	(Russia) Rinat Salikhov					Ret	14	9	14	8	16	Ret	19	8	13	8
29	(South Africa) David Perel			20	Ret	21	21	9	14	8	16	Ret	19	8	13	8
30	(Italy) Raffaele Giammaria (China) Liang Jiatong	15	11	16	14	13	18	Ret	8	11	18	8	9	16	23	8
31	(Italy) Eddie Cheever III (Denmark) Nicklas Nielsen											6	10			6
32	(Germany) Christian Hook			22	20	Ret	24	7	16			18	14	15	10	6
33	(Italy) Andrea Bertolini							6	12							5
34	(Republic of Ireland) Matt Griffin					6	11							7	9	5
35	(Brazil) Alan Hellmeister			13	6							13	11			5
36	(Germany) Daniel Keilwitz							7	16	17	17					4
37	(Belgium) Wolfgang Reip (Belgium) Tim Verbergt					7	17									4
38	(Italy) Stefano Costantini			9	18	14	13	Ret	Ret	15	9	21	20	19	18	4
39	(Germany) Thomas Jäger (Austria) Mario Plachutta			10	Ret							9	23	10	Ret	4
40	(Germany) Dominik Schwager											18	14	15	10	2
41	(Poland) Marcin Jedlinski (Poland) Mateusz Lisowski							13	9					29	20	2
42	(Italy) Giuseppe Cipriani (United Kingdom) Toby Sowery	19	12	14	9	20	19	12	Ret	18	15	Ret	13	26	15	2
43	(Slovakia) Miro Konôpka	16	17	21	10	19	22	16	Ret	20	22	20	16			1
43	(Latvia) Konstantīns Calko	16	17	21	10	19	22									1
44	(United Kingdom) Jamie Campbell-Walter (Austria) Ferdinand Habsburg	10	21													1
45	(Poland) Malgorzata Rdest													27	25	0
46	(United Kingdom) Phil Keen													13	7	0
47	(Brazil) Márcio Basso	Ret	16	17	12	16	25	Ret	Ret	24	WD	12	15	20	Ret	0
47	(Brazil) Thiago Marques	Ret	16	17	12	16	25	Ret	Ret							0
47	(Brazil) Guilherme Salas											12	15	20	DNS	0
48	(Slovakia) Zdeno Mikulasko							16	Ret			20	16			0
49	(Italy) Andrea Rizzoli													1	Ret	0
50	(Denmark) Mikkel Jensen													5	5	0
51	(Italy) Mario Cordoni (Italy) Marco Zanuttini	18	20													0
51	(United Kingdom) Ian Loggie (United Kingdom) Callum MacLeod									Ret	14					0
52	(Brazil) Cacá Bueno							17	15	14	21					0
53	(Brazil) Giulio Borlenghi (Poland) Andrzej Lewandowski	17	14	18	15	15	20	19	17	19	19	14	21	22	19	0
54	(Austria) Alexander Hrachowina (Austria) Martin Konrad	13	19	15	11	DNS	DNS	15	20	21	Ret	16	25			0
55	(Switzerland) Adrian Zaugg													Ret	26	0
56	(Belgium) Bernard Delhez											21	20			0
57	(Portugal) "Miguel Sardinha" (Portugal) "Manuel Da Costa"	12	18	19	13	18	23	18	18					24	22	0
58	(Russia) Vadim Kogay			20	Ret	21	21									0
59	(Ukraine) Aleksey Chuklin									24	20					0
60	(United Kingdom) Darren Burke									20	22					0
61	(Portugal) Duarte Félix Da Costa											19	24			0
61	(Brazil) Ricardo Baptista							17	15			19	24			0
62	(Poland) Stanislaw Jedlinski							20	DNS					27	25	0
63	(Germany) Steve Parrow			22	20	Ret	24			17	17					0
Guest drivers ineligible to score points
—	(Austria) Lucas Auer (Brazil) Christian Hahn													28	3	—
—	(Netherlands) Indy Dontje (United States) Russell Ward													18	14	—
—	(United States) Phillippe Denes (United States) Charles Finelli													25	21	—
Pos	Driver	EST (Portugal)		LEC (France)		SPA (Belgium)		HUN (Hungary)		SIL (United Kingdom)		MNZ (Italy)		CAT (Spain)		Total

Colour	Result
Gold	Winner
Silver	Second place
Bronze	Third place
Green	Points classification
Blue	Non-points classification
Blue	Non-classified finish (NC)
Purple	Retired, not classified (Ret)
Red	Did not qualify (DNQ)
Red	Did not pre-qualify (DNPQ)
Black	Disqualified (DSQ)
White	Did not start (DNS)
White	Withdrew (WD)
White	Race cancelled (C)
Blank	Did not practice (DNP)
Blank	Did not arrive (DNA)
Blank	Excluded (EX)
