= 2019 British GT Championship =

Sports car racing season

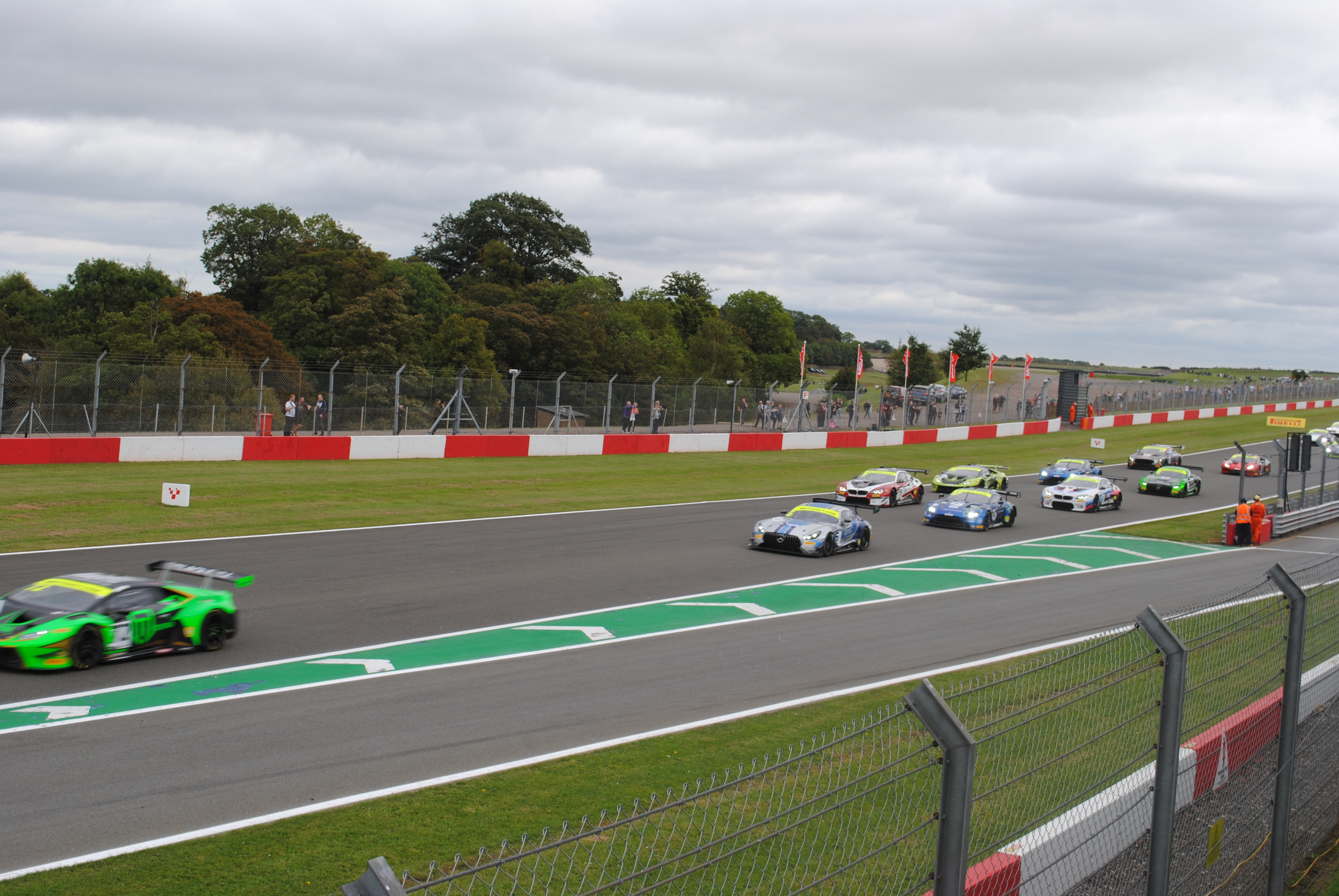
A field of GT3 cars in the finale at Donington Park.

The 2019 British GT Championship was the 27th British GT Championship, a sports car championship promoted by the Stéphane Ratel Organisation (SRO). The season began on 20 April at Oulton Park and finished on 15 September at Donington Park, after ten rounds held over seven meetings.

== Calendar ==
The calendar for the 2019 season was announced on 30 July 2018. Except for the Belgian round at Spa, all races were held in the United Kingdom.

Round	Circuit	Length	Date
1	(United Kingdom) Oulton Park, Cheshire	60 min	22 April
2	(United Kingdom) Oulton Park, Cheshire	60 min	22 April
3	(United Kingdom) Snetterton Circuit, Norfolk	60 min	19 May
4	(United Kingdom) Snetterton Circuit, Norfolk	60 min	19 May
5	(United Kingdom) Silverstone Circuit, Northamptonshire	180 min	9 June
6	(United Kingdom) Donington Park, Leicestershire	120 min	23 June
7	Circuit de Spa-Francorchamps, Spa, Belgium	120 min	21 July
8	(United Kingdom) Brands Hatch, Kent	120 min	4 August
9	(United Kingdom) Donington Park, Leicestershire	120 min	15 September

=== Calendar changes ===
- The round at Rockingham Motor Speedway was dropped and replaced with a second round at Donington Park.

== Entry list ==
=== GT3 ===
Team	Car	Engine	No.	Drivers	Class		Rounds
Team	Car	Engine	No.	Drivers	Car	Driver	Rounds
(United Kingdom) TF Sport	Aston Martin Vantage AMR GT3	Aston Martin 4.0 L Turbo V8	2	(United Kingdom) Mark Farmer	GT3	PA	All
(United Kingdom) TF Sport	Aston Martin Vantage AMR GT3	Aston Martin 4.0 L Turbo V8	2	(Denmark) Nicki Thiim	GT3	PA	All
(United Kingdom) TF Sport	Aston Martin Vantage AMR GT3	Aston Martin 4.0 L Turbo V8	47	(United Kingdom) Jonathan Adam	GT3	PA	All
(United Kingdom) TF Sport	Aston Martin Vantage AMR GT3	Aston Martin 4.0 L Turbo V8	47	(United Kingdom) Graham Davidson	GT3	PA	All
(United Kingdom) Century Motorsport	BMW M6 GT3	BMW 4.4 L Turbo V8	3	(United Kingdom) Ben Green	GT3	PA	All
(United Kingdom) Century Motorsport	BMW M6 GT3	BMW 4.4 L Turbo V8	3	(United Kingdom) Dominic Paul	GT3	PA	All
(United Kingdom) Century Motorsport	BMW M6 GT3	BMW 4.4 L Turbo V8	9	(United Kingdom) Jack Mitchell	GT3	PA	1–2, 5–7
(United Kingdom) Century Motorsport	BMW M6 GT3	BMW 4.4 L Turbo V8	9	(United Kingdom) Adrian Willmott	GT3	PA	1–2
(United Kingdom) Century Motorsport	BMW M6 GT3	BMW 4.4 L Turbo V8	9	(United Kingdom) JM Littman	GT3	PA	5–7
(United Kingdom) Century Motorsport	BMW M6 GT3	BMW 4.4 L Turbo V8	9	(United Kingdom) Jack Mitchell	GT3	S	3–4, 8–9
(United Kingdom) Century Motorsport	BMW M6 GT3	BMW 4.4 L Turbo V8	9	(United Kingdom) Tom Gamble	GT3	S	3–4
(United Kingdom) Century Motorsport	BMW M6 GT3	BMW 4.4 L Turbo V8	9	(United Kingdom) Angus Fender	GT3	S	8–9
(United Kingdom) Ram Racing	Mercedes-AMG GT3	Mercedes-AMG M159 6.2 L V8	6	(United Kingdom) Ian Loggie	GT3	PA	1–2, 5–9
(United Kingdom) Ram Racing	Mercedes-AMG GT3	Mercedes-AMG M159 6.2 L V8	6	(United Kingdom) Callum MacLeod	GT3	PA	1–2, 5–9
(United Kingdom) Team Parker Racing	Bentley Continental GT3	Bentley 4.0 L Turbo V8	7	(United Kingdom) Ryan Ratcliffe	GT3	S	All
(United Kingdom) Team Parker Racing	Bentley Continental GT3	Bentley 4.0 L Turbo V8	7	(United Kingdom) Glynn Geddie	GT3	S	1–8
(United Kingdom) Team Parker Racing	Bentley Continental GT3	Bentley 4.0 L Turbo V8	7	(United Kingdom) Jordan Witt	GT3	S	9
(United Kingdom) Team ABBA Racing	Mercedes-AMG GT3	Mercedes-AMG M159 6.2 L V8	8	(United Kingdom) Richard Neary	GT3	PA	All
(United Kingdom) Team ABBA Racing	Mercedes-AMG GT3	Mercedes-AMG M159 6.2 L V8	8	(United Kingdom) Adam Christodoulou	GT3	PA	1–5, 7, 9
(United Kingdom) Team ABBA Racing	Mercedes-AMG GT3	Mercedes-AMG M159 6.2 L V8	8	(United Kingdom) Tom Onslow-Cole	GT3	PA	6, 8
(United Kingdom) WPI Motorsport	Porsche 991 GT3 Cup	Porsche 4.0 L Flat-6	18	(United Kingdom) Michael Igoe	GTC	PA	1–2
(United Kingdom) WPI Motorsport	Porsche 991 GT3 Cup	Porsche 4.0 L Flat-6	18	(United Kingdom) Adam Wilcox	GTC	PA	1–2
(United Kingdom) WPI Motorsport	Lamborghini Huracán GT3	Lamborghini 5.2 L V10	18	(United Kingdom) Michael Igoe	GT3	PA	3–9
(United Kingdom) WPI Motorsport	Lamborghini Huracán GT3	Lamborghini 5.2 L V10	18	(United Kingdom) Adam Wilcox	GT3	PA	3–4
(United Kingdom) WPI Motorsport	Lamborghini Huracán GT3	Lamborghini 5.2 L V10	18	(Denmark) Dennis Lind	GT3	PA	5–9
(United Kingdom) Balfe Motorsport	McLaren 720S GT3	McLaren M840T 4.0 L Turbo V8	22	(United Kingdom) Shaun Balfe	GT3	PA	All
(United Kingdom) Balfe Motorsport	McLaren 720S GT3	McLaren M840T 4.0 L Turbo V8	22	(United Kingdom) Rob Bell	GT3	PA	All
(United Kingdom) JRM Racing	Bentley Continental GT3	Bentley 4.0 L Turbo V8	31	(United Kingdom) Seb Morris	GT3	PA	All
(United Kingdom) JRM Racing	Bentley Continental GT3	Bentley 4.0 L Turbo V8	31	(United Kingdom) Rick Parfitt Jr.	GT3	PA	All
(United Kingdom) G-Cat Racing	Porsche 911 GT3 R	Porsche 4.0 L Flat-6	33	(United Kingdom) Greg Caton	GT3	Am	5–7, 9
(United Kingdom) G-Cat Racing	Porsche 911 GT3 R	Porsche 4.0 L Flat-6	33	(United Kingdom) Shamus Jennings	GT3	Am	5–7, 9
(Belgium) M2 Competition	Aston Martin Vantage AMR GT3	Aston Martin 4.0 L Turbo V8	37	(United Kingdom) Tony Quinn	GT3	PA	7
(Belgium) M2 Competition	Aston Martin Vantage AMR GT3	Aston Martin 4.0 L Turbo V8	37	(United Kingdom) Darren Turner	GT3	PA	7
(United Kingdom) JMH Automotive	Lamborghini Huracán GT3	Lamborghini 5.2 L V10	55	(United Kingdom) John Seale	GT3	PA	5–6
(United Kingdom) JMH Automotive	Lamborghini Huracán GT3	Lamborghini 5.2 L V10	55	(United Kingdom) Jamie Stanley	GT3	PA	5–6
(United Kingdom) Barwell Motorsport	Lamborghini Huracán GT3	Lamborghini 5.2 L V10	69	(United Kingdom) Jonny Cocker	GT3	PA	All
(United Kingdom) Barwell Motorsport	Lamborghini Huracán GT3	Lamborghini 5.2 L V10	69	(United Kingdom) Sam De Haan	GT3	PA	All
(United Kingdom) Barwell Motorsport	Lamborghini Huracán GT3	Lamborghini 5.2 L V10	72	(United Kingdom) Adam Balon	GT3	PA	All
(United Kingdom) Barwell Motorsport	Lamborghini Huracán GT3	Lamborghini 5.2 L V10	72	(United Kingdom) Phil Keen	GT3	PA	All
(United Kingdom) Optimum Motorsport	Aston Martin Vantage AMR GT3	Aston Martin 4.0 L Turbo V8	96	(United Kingdom) Bradley Ellis	GT3	S	All
(United Kingdom) Optimum Motorsport	Aston Martin Vantage AMR GT3	Aston Martin 4.0 L Turbo V8	96	(United Kingdom) Oliver Wilkinson	GT3	S	All
(United Kingdom) Beechdean AMR	Aston Martin Vantage AMR GT3	Aston Martin 4.0 L Turbo V8	99	(United Kingdom) Andrew Howard	GT3	PA	1–6, 8–9
(United Kingdom) Beechdean AMR	Aston Martin Vantage AMR GT3	Aston Martin 4.0 L Turbo V8	99	(Denmark) Marco Sørensen	GT3	PA	1–5
(United Kingdom) Beechdean AMR	Aston Martin Vantage AMR GT3	Aston Martin 4.0 L Turbo V8	99	(United Kingdom) Ross Gunn	GT3	PA	6
(United Kingdom) Beechdean AMR	Aston Martin Vantage AMR GT3	Aston Martin 4.0 L Turbo V8	99	(France) Valentin Hasse-Clot	GT3	PA	8–9
Entry Lists:

Icon	Class
Car
GT3	GT3 Cars
GTC	GTC Cars
Drivers
PA	Pro-Am Cup
S	Silver Cup
Am	Am Cup

=== GT4 ===
Team	Car	Engine	No.	Drivers	Class	Rounds
(United Kingdom) Tolman Motorsport	McLaren 570S GT4	McLaren 3.8 L Turbo V8	4	(United Kingdom) James Dorlin	S	All
(United Kingdom) Tolman Motorsport	McLaren 570S GT4	McLaren 3.8 L Turbo V8	4	(United Kingdom) Josh Smith	S	All
(United Kingdom) Tolman Motorsport	McLaren 570S GT4	McLaren 3.8 L Turbo V8	5	(United Kingdom) Jordan Collard	S	All
(United Kingdom) Tolman Motorsport	McLaren 570S GT4	McLaren 3.8 L Turbo V8	5	(United Kingdom) Lewis Proctor	S	All
(United Kingdom) Beechdean AMR	Aston Martin Vantage AMR GT4	Aston Martin 4.0 L Turbo V8	11	(United Kingdom) Kelvin Fletcher	PA	All
(United Kingdom) Beechdean AMR	Aston Martin Vantage AMR GT4	Aston Martin 4.0 L Turbo V8	11	(United Kingdom) Martin Plowman	PA	All
(United Kingdom) Generation AMR SuperRacing	Aston Martin Vantage AMR GT4	Aston Martin 4.0 L Turbo V8	14	(United Kingdom) Matthew George	PA	5
(United Kingdom) Generation AMR SuperRacing	Aston Martin Vantage AMR GT4	Aston Martin 4.0 L Turbo V8	14	(United Kingdom) James Holder	PA	5
(Canada) Multimatic Motorsports	Ford Mustang GT4	Ford 5.2 L Voodoo V8	15	(Canada) Scott Maxwell	S	All
(Canada) Multimatic Motorsports	Ford Mustang GT4	Ford 5.2 L Voodoo V8	15	(United Kingdom) Sebastian Priaulx	S	All
(Canada) Multimatic Motorsports	Ford Mustang GT4	Ford 5.2 L Voodoo V8	19	(United States) Chad McCumbee	S	1–2, 5
(Canada) Multimatic Motorsports	Ford Mustang GT4	Ford 5.2 L Voodoo V8	19	(United States) Jade Buford	S	1–2
(Canada) Multimatic Motorsports	Ford Mustang GT4	Ford 5.2 L Voodoo V8	19	(United Kingdom) Harrison Newey	S	5
(Canada) Multimatic Motorsports	Ford Mustang GT4	Ford 5.2 L Voodoo V8	19	(United Kingdom) Ashley Davies	S	9
(Canada) Multimatic Motorsports	Ford Mustang GT4	Ford 5.2 L Voodoo V8	19	(Canada) Marco Signoretti	S	9
(Canada) Multimatic Motorsports	Ford Mustang GT4	Ford 5.2 L Voodoo V8	19	(United Kingdom) Ben Devlin	PA	3–4
(Canada) Multimatic Motorsports	Ford Mustang GT4	Ford 5.2 L Voodoo V8	19	(United Kingdom) Alistair MacKinnon	PA	3–4
(Canada) Multimatic Motorsports	Ford Mustang GT4	Ford 5.2 L Voodoo V8	19	(United Kingdom) Chris Hoy	PA	6–7
(Canada) Multimatic Motorsports	Ford Mustang GT4	Ford 5.2 L Voodoo V8	19	(United States) Billy Johnson	PA	6
(Canada) Multimatic Motorsports	Ford Mustang GT4	Ford 5.2 L Voodoo V8	19	(United Kingdom) Andy Priaulx	PA	7
(Canada) Multimatic Motorsports	Ford Mustang GT4	Ford 5.2 L Voodoo V8	19	(United Kingdom) Richard Meaden	PA	8
(Canada) Multimatic Motorsports	Ford Mustang GT4	Ford 5.2 L Voodoo V8	19	(United States) Jack Roush Jr.	PA	8
(United Kingdom) Balfe Motorsport	McLaren 570S GT4	McLaren 3.8 L Turbo V8	20	(United Kingdom) Michael O'Brien	PA	All
(United Kingdom) Balfe Motorsport	McLaren 570S GT4	McLaren 3.8 L Turbo V8	20	(United Kingdom) Graham Johnson	PA	All
(United Kingdom) Balfe Motorsport	McLaren 570S GT4	McLaren 3.8 L Turbo V8	21	(Sweden) Mia Flewitt	Am	5–7
(United Kingdom) Balfe Motorsport	McLaren 570S GT4	McLaren 3.8 L Turbo V8	21	(United Kingdom) Stewart Proctor	Am	5–7
(United Kingdom) RACE Performance	Ford Mustang GT4	Ford 5.2 L Voodoo V8	23	(United Kingdom) Sam Smelt	S	All
(United Kingdom) RACE Performance	Ford Mustang GT4	Ford 5.2 L Voodoo V8	23	(Republic of Ireland) Árón Taylor-Smith	S	All
(United Kingdom) Steller Performance	Audi R8 LMS GT4	Audi 5.2 L V10	29	(United Kingdom) Sennan Fielding	PA	3–4
(United Kingdom) Steller Performance	Audi R8 LMS GT4	Audi 5.2 L V10	29	(United Kingdom) Richard Williams	PA	3–4
(United Kingdom) Steller Performance	Audi R8 LMS GT4	Audi 5.2 L V10	29	(United Kingdom) Sennan Fielding	S	5–9
(United Kingdom) Steller Performance	Audi R8 LMS GT4	Audi 5.2 L V10	29	(United Kingdom) Richard Williams	S	5–9
(United Kingdom) ERC Sport	Mercedes-AMG GT4	Mercedes-AMG M178 4.0 L V8	30	(United Kingdom) Peter Belshaw	PA	5
(United Kingdom) ERC Sport	Mercedes-AMG GT4	Mercedes-AMG M178 4.0 L V8	30	(Germany) Maximilian Buhk	PA	5
(United Kingdom) Track Focused	KTM X-Bow GT4	KTM 2.0 L Audi-Turbo I4	32	(United Kingdom) Sean Cooper	PA	1–6, 8–9
(United Kingdom) Track Focused	KTM X-Bow GT4	KTM 2.0 L Audi-Turbo I4	32	(United Kingdom) Mike McCollum	PA	1–6, 8–9
(United Kingdom) Track Focused	KTM X-Bow GT4	KTM 2.0 L Audi-Turbo I4	74	(United Kingdom) Alexander McEwen	PA	6–7
(United Kingdom) Track Focused	KTM X-Bow GT4	KTM 2.0 L Audi-Turbo I4	74	(United Kingdom) Ross McEwen	PA	6–7
(United Kingdom) Optimum Motorsport	Aston Martin Vantage AMR GT4	Aston Martin 4.0 L Turbo V8	35	(United Kingdom) Jack Butel	S	All
(United Kingdom) Optimum Motorsport	Aston Martin Vantage AMR GT4	Aston Martin 4.0 L Turbo V8	35	(Republic of Ireland) Connor O’Brien	S	All
(United Kingdom) Optimum Motorsport	Aston Martin Vantage AMR GT4	Aston Martin 4.0 L Turbo V8	75	(United Kingdom) Mike Robinson	S	All
(United Kingdom) Optimum Motorsport	Aston Martin Vantage AMR GT4	Aston Martin 4.0 L Turbo V8	75	(Denmark) Patrik Matthiesen	S	All
(United Kingdom) Century Motorsport	BMW M4 GT4	BMW N55 3.0 L Twin-Turbo I6	42	(Denmark) Jacob Mathiassen	S	All
(United Kingdom) Century Motorsport	BMW M4 GT4	BMW N55 3.0 L Twin-Turbo I6	42	(United Kingdom) Mark Kimber	S	1–8
(United Kingdom) Century Motorsport	BMW M4 GT4	BMW N55 3.0 L Twin-Turbo I6	42	(Republic of Ireland) Niall Murray	S	9
(United Kingdom) Century Motorsport	BMW M4 GT4	BMW N55 3.0 L Twin-Turbo I6	43	(United Kingdom) Andrew Gordon-Colebrooke	S	All
(United Kingdom) Century Motorsport	BMW M4 GT4	BMW N55 3.0 L Twin-Turbo I6	43	(United Kingdom) Angus Fender	S	1–7
(United Kingdom) Century Motorsport	BMW M4 GT4	BMW N55 3.0 L Twin-Turbo I6	43	(United Kingdom) Nathan Freke	S	8–9
(United Kingdom) Invictus Games Racing	Jaguar F-Type SVR GT4	Jaguar 5.0 L S/C V8	44	(United Kingdom) Matt George	PA	1–8
(United Kingdom) Invictus Games Racing	Jaguar F-Type SVR GT4	Jaguar 5.0 L S/C V8	44	(United Kingdom) Steve McCulley	PA	1–2, 7–8
(United Kingdom) Invictus Games Racing	Jaguar F-Type SVR GT4	Jaguar 5.0 L S/C V8	44	(United Kingdom) Paul Vice	PA	3–6
(United Kingdom) Invictus Games Racing	Jaguar F-Type SVR GT4	Jaguar 5.0 L S/C V8	44	(United Kingdom) Steve McCulley	Am	9
(United Kingdom) Invictus Games Racing	Jaguar F-Type SVR GT4	Jaguar 5.0 L S/C V8	44	(United Kingdom) Paul Vice	Am	9
(Sweden) ALFAB Racing	McLaren 570S GT4	McLaren 3.8 L Turbo V8	52	(Sweden) Erik Behrens	PA	7
(Sweden) ALFAB Racing	McLaren 570S GT4	McLaren 3.8 L Turbo V8	52	(Sweden) Daniel Roos	PA	7
(United Kingdom) HHC Motorsport	McLaren 570S GT4	McLaren 3.8 L Turbo V8	57	(United Kingdom) Dean MacDonald	S	All
(United Kingdom) HHC Motorsport	McLaren 570S GT4	McLaren 3.8 L Turbo V8	57	(United Kingdom) Callum Pointon	S	All
(United Kingdom) HHC Motorsport	McLaren 570S GT4	McLaren 3.8 L Turbo V8	58	(United Kingdom) Luke Williams	S	1–7
(United Kingdom) HHC Motorsport	McLaren 570S GT4	McLaren 3.8 L Turbo V8	58	(United Kingdom) Tom Jackson	S	1–6
(United Kingdom) HHC Motorsport	McLaren 570S GT4	McLaren 3.8 L Turbo V8	58	(Netherlands) Ruben Del Sarte	S	7–9
(United Kingdom) HHC Motorsport	McLaren 570S GT4	McLaren 3.8 L Turbo V8	58	(United Kingdom) Jamie Caroline	S	8
(United Kingdom) HHC Motorsport	McLaren 570S GT4	McLaren 3.8 L Turbo V8	58	(United Kingdom) Jordan Albert	S	9
(United Kingdom) Academy Motorsports	Aston Martin Vantage AMR GT41–6, 8–9; McLaren 570S GT47	Aston Martin 4.0 L Turbo V8; McLaren 3.8 L Turbo V8	61	(Canada) Ben Hurst	S	All
(United Kingdom) Academy Motorsports	Aston Martin Vantage AMR GT41–6, 8–9; McLaren 570S GT47	Aston Martin 4.0 L Turbo V8; McLaren 3.8 L Turbo V8	61	(Monaco) Micah Stanley	S	All
(United Kingdom) Academy Motorsports	Aston Martin Vantage AMR GT4	Aston Martin 4.0 L Turbo V8	62	(United Kingdom) Alex Toth-Jones	S	All
(United Kingdom) Academy Motorsports	Aston Martin Vantage AMR GT4	Aston Martin 4.0 L Turbo V8	62	(United Kingdom) Will Moore	S	All
(United Kingdom) Team Parker Racing	Mercedes-AMG GT4	Mercedes-AMG M178 4.0 L V8	66	(United Kingdom) Nick Jones	PA	All
(United Kingdom) Team Parker Racing	Mercedes-AMG GT4	Mercedes-AMG M178 4.0 L V8	66	(United Kingdom) Scott Malvern	PA	All
(United Kingdom) Fox Motorsport	Mercedes-AMG GT4	Mercedes-AMG M178 4.0 L V8	77	(United Kingdom) Michael Broadhurst	PA	All
(United Kingdom) Fox Motorsport	Mercedes-AMG GT4	Mercedes-AMG M178 4.0 L V8	77	(United Kingdom) Mark Murfitt	PA	All
(United Kingdom) GT Marques	Porsche 718 Cayman GT4 Clubsport	Porsche 3.8L flat-6	88	(United Kingdom) Dino Zamparelli	PA	3–9
(United Kingdom) GT Marques	Porsche 718 Cayman GT4 Clubsport	Porsche 3.8L flat-6	88	(United Kingdom) Chris Car	PA	3–6, 8–9
(United Kingdom) GT Marques	Porsche 718 Cayman GT4 Clubsport	Porsche 3.8L flat-6	88	(United Kingdom) Brent Millage	PA	7
(United Kingdom) TF Sport	Aston Martin Vantage AMR GT4	Aston Martin 4.0 L Turbo V8	95	(United Kingdom) Patrick Kibble	S	All
(United Kingdom) TF Sport	Aston Martin Vantage AMR GT4	Aston Martin 4.0 L Turbo V8	95	(United Kingdom) Josh Price	S	All
(United Kingdom) TF Sport	Aston Martin Vantage AMR GT4	Aston Martin 4.0 L Turbo V8	97	(United Kingdom) Tom Canning	S	All
(United Kingdom) TF Sport	Aston Martin Vantage AMR GT4	Aston Martin 4.0 L Turbo V8	97	(United Kingdom) Ash Hand	S	All
Entry Lists:

Icon	Class
PA	Pro-Am Cup
S	Silver Cup
Am	Am Cup

== Race results ==
Bold indicates overall winner for each car class (GT3 and GT4).

=== GT3 ===
Event	Circuit	Pole position	Pro-Am winners	Silver winners	Am winners	GTC winners
1	Oulton Park	(United Kingdom) No. 6 Ram Racing	**(United Kingdom) No. 31 JRM Racing**	(United Kingdom) No. 96 Optimum Motorsport	No Entrants	(United Kingdom) No. 18 WPI Motorsport
1	Oulton Park	(United Kingdom) Ian Loggie (United Kingdom) Callum MacLeod	**(United Kingdom) Seb Morris** **(United Kingdom) Rick Parfitt, Jr.**	(United Kingdom) Bradley Ellis (United Kingdom) Oliver Wilkinson	No Entrants	(United Kingdom) Michael Igoe (United Kingdom) Adam Wilcox
2	Oulton Park	(United Kingdom) No. 72 Barwell Motorsport	**(United Kingdom) No. 69 Barwell Motorsport**	(United Kingdom) No. 96 Optimum Motorsport	No Entrants	(United Kingdom) No. 18 WPI Motorsport
2	Oulton Park	(United Kingdom) Adam Balon (United Kingdom) Phil Keen	**(United Kingdom) Jonny Cocker** **(United Kingdom) Sam De Haan**	(United Kingdom) Bradley Ellis (United Kingdom) Oliver Wilkinson	No Entrants	(United Kingdom) Michael Igoe (United Kingdom) Adam Wilcox
3	Snetterton	(United Kingdom) No. 9 Century Motorsport	**(United Kingdom) No. 72 Barwell Motorsport**	(United Kingdom) No. 7 Team Parker Racing	No Entrants	No Entrants
3	Snetterton	(United Kingdom) Jack Mitchell (United Kingdom) Tom Gamble	**(United Kingdom) Adam Balon** **(United Kingdom) Phil Keen**	(United Kingdom) Glynn Geddie (United Kingdom) Ryan Ratcliffe	No Entrants	No Entrants
4	Snetterton	(United Kingdom) No. 2 TF Sport	**(United Kingdom) No. 72 Barwell Motorsport**	(United Kingdom) No. 96 Optimum Motorsport	No Entrants	No Entrants
4	Snetterton	(United Kingdom) Mark Farmer (Denmark) Nicki Thiim	**(United Kingdom) Adam Balon** **(United Kingdom) Phil Keen**	(United Kingdom) Bradley Ellis (United Kingdom) Oliver Wilkinson	No Entrants	No Entrants
5	Silverstone	(United Kingdom) No. 47 TF Sport	**(United Kingdom) No. 6 Ram Racing**	(United Kingdom) No. 96 Optimum Motorsport	(United Kingdom) No. 33 G-Cat Racing	No Entrants
5	Silverstone	(United Kingdom) Jonny Adam (United Kingdom) Graham Davidson	**(United Kingdom) Ian Loggie** **(United Kingdom) Callum MacLeod**	(United Kingdom) Bradley Ellis (United Kingdom) Oliver Wilkinson	(United Kingdom) Greg Caton (United Kingdom) Shamus Jennings	No Entrants
6	Donington Park	(United Kingdom) No. 47 TF Sport	**(United Kingdom) No. 47 TF Sport**	(United Kingdom) No. 7 Team Parker Racing	(United Kingdom) No. 33 G-Cat Racing	No Entrants
6	Donington Park	(United Kingdom) Jonny Adam (United Kingdom) Graham Davidson	**(United Kingdom) Jonny Adam** **(United Kingdom) Graham Davidson**	(United Kingdom) Glynn Geddie (United Kingdom) Ryan Ratcliffe	(United Kingdom) Greg Caton (United Kingdom) Shamus Jennings	No Entrants
7	Spa-Francorchamps	(United Kingdom) No. 96 Optimum Motorsport	(United Kingdom) No. 6 Ram Racing	**(United Kingdom) No. 96 Optimum Motorsport**	(United Kingdom) No. 33 G-Cat Racing	No Entrants
7	Spa-Francorchamps	(United Kingdom) Bradley Ellis (United Kingdom) Oliver Wilkinson	(United Kingdom) Ian Loggie (United Kingdom) Callum MacLeod	**(United Kingdom) Bradley Ellis** **(United Kingdom) Oliver Wilkinson**	(United Kingdom) Greg Caton (United Kingdom) Shamus Jennings	No Entrants
8	Brands Hatch	(United Kingdom) No. 22 Balfe Motorsport	**(United Kingdom) No. 47 TF Sport**	(United Kingdom) No. 9 Century Motorsport	No Entrants	No Entrants
8	Brands Hatch	(United Kingdom) Shaun Balfe (United Kingdom) Rob Bell	**(United Kingdom) Jonny Adam** **(United Kingdom) Graham Davidson**	(United Kingdom) Angus Fender (United Kingdom) Jack Mitchell	No Entrants	No Entrants
9	Donington Park	(United Kingdom) No. 22 Balfe Motorsport	**(United Kingdom) No. 22 Balfe Motorsport**	(United Kingdom) No. 9 Century Motorsport	(United Kingdom) No. 33 G-Cat Racing	No Entrants
9	Donington Park	(United Kingdom) Shaun Balfe (United Kingdom) Rob Bell	**(United Kingdom) Shaun Balfe** **(United Kingdom) Rob Bell**	(United Kingdom) Angus Fender (United Kingdom) Jack Mitchell	(United Kingdom) Greg Caton (United Kingdom) Shamus Jennings	No Entrants

=== GT4 ===
Event	Circuit	Pole position	Pro-Am winners	Silver winners	Am winners
1	Oulton Park	(Canada) No. 15 Multimatic Motorsports	(United Kingdom) No. 44 Invictus Games Racing	**(United Kingdom) No. 57 HHC Motorsport**	No Entrants
1	Oulton Park	(Canada) Scott Maxwell (United Kingdom) Sebastian Priaulx	(United Kingdom) Matt George (United Kingdom) Steve McCulley	**(United Kingdom) Dean MacDonald** **(United Kingdom) Callum Pointon**	No Entrants
2	Oulton Park	(Canada) No. 15 Multimatic Motorsports	(United Kingdom) No. 20 Balfe Motorsport	**(Canada) No. 15 Multimatic Motorsports**	No Entrants
2	Oulton Park	(Canada) Scott Maxwell (United Kingdom) Sebastian Priaulx	(United Kingdom) Michael O'Brien (United Kingdom) Graham Johnson	**(Canada) Scott Maxwell** **(United Kingdom) Sebastian Priaulx**	No Entrants
3	Snetterton	(Canada) No. 15 Multimatic Motorsports	**(United Kingdom) No. 29 Steller Performance**	(United Kingdom) No. 4 Tolman Motorsport	No Entrants
3	Snetterton	(Canada) Scott Maxwell (United Kingdom) Sebastian Priaulx	**(United Kingdom) Sennan Fielding** **(United Kingdom) Richard Williams**	(United Kingdom) James Dorlin (United Kingdom) Josh Smith	No Entrants
4	Snetterton	(United Kingdom) No. 66 Team Parker Racing	(United Kingdom) No. 11 Beechdean AMR	**(United Kingdom) No. 5 Tolman Motorsport**	No Entrants
4	Snetterton	(United Kingdom) Nick Jones (United Kingdom) Scott Malvern	(United Kingdom) Kelvin Fletcher (United Kingdom) Martin Plowman	**(United Kingdom) Jordan Collard** **(United Kingdom) Lewis Proctor**	No Entrants
5	Silverstone	(United Kingdom) No. 95 TF Sport	**(United Kingdom) No. 66 Team Parker Racing**	(United Kingdom) No. 97 TF Sport	(United Kingdom) No. 21 Balfe Motorsport
5	Silverstone	(United Kingdom) Patrick Kibble (United Kingdom) Josh Price	**(United Kingdom) Nick Jones** **(United Kingdom) Scott Malvern**	(United Kingdom) Tom Canning (United Kingdom) Ashley Hand	(Sweden) Mia Flewitt (United Kingdom) Stewart Proctor
6	Donington Park	(Canada) No. 15 Multimatic Motorsports	(Canada) No. 19 Multimatic Motorsports	**(Canada) No. 15 Multimatic Motorsports**	(United Kingdom) No. 21 Balfe Motorsport
6	Donington Park	(Canada) Scott Maxwell (United Kingdom) Sebastian Priaulx	(United States) Billy Johnson (United Kingdom) Chris Hoy	**(Canada) Scott Maxwell** **(United Kingdom) Sebastian Priaulx**	(Sweden) Mia Flewitt (United Kingdom) Stewart Proctor
7	Spa-Francorchamps	(United Kingdom) No. 42 Century Motorsport	(United Kingdom) No. 20 Balfe Motorsport	**(United Kingdom) No. 97 TF Sport**	(United Kingdom) No. 21 Balfe Motorsport
7	Spa-Francorchamps	(United Kingdom) Mark Kimber (Denmark) Jacob Mathiassen	(United Kingdom) Michael O'Brien (United Kingdom) Graham Johnson	**(United Kingdom) Tom Canning** **(United Kingdom) Ashley Hand**	(Sweden) Mia Flewitt (United Kingdom) Stewart Proctor
8	Brands Hatch	(United Kingdom) No. 57 HHC Motorsport	(United Kingdom) No. 11 Beechdean AMR	**(United Kingdom) No. 4 Tolman Motorsport**	No Entrants
8	Brands Hatch	(United Kingdom) Dean MacDonald (United Kingdom) Callum Pointon	(United Kingdom) Kelvin Fletcher (United Kingdom) Martin Plowman	**(United Kingdom) James Dorlin** **(United Kingdom) Josh Smith**	No Entrants
9	Donington Park	(United Kingdom) No. 29 Steller Performance	(United Kingdom) No. 11 Beechdean AMR	**(United Kingdom) No. 29 Steller Performance**	(United Kingdom) No. 44 Invictus Games Racing
9	Donington Park	(United Kingdom) Sennan Fielding (United Kingdom) Richard Williams	(United Kingdom) Kelvin Fletcher (United Kingdom) Martin Plowman	**(United Kingdom) Sennan Fielding** **(United Kingdom) Richard Williams**	(United Kingdom) Steve McCulley (United Kingdom) Paul Vice

== Championship standings ==
Points are awarded as follows:

Length	1st	2nd	3rd	4th	5th	6th	7th	8th	9th	10th
1 hour	25	18	15	12	10	8	6	4	2	1
2+ hours	37.5	27	22.5	18	15	12	9	6	3	1.5

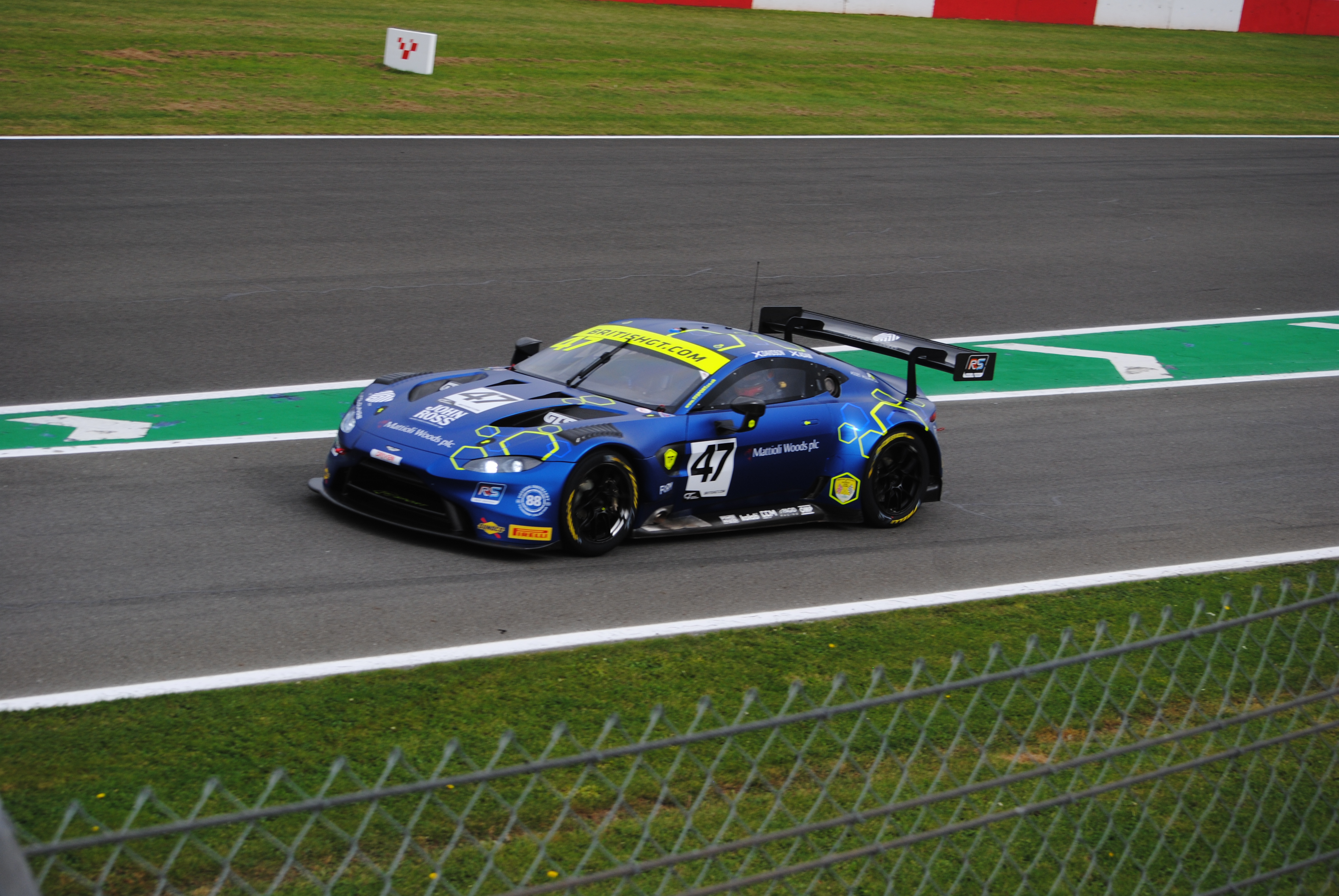
The GT3 champions, Jonathan Adam and Graham Davidson.

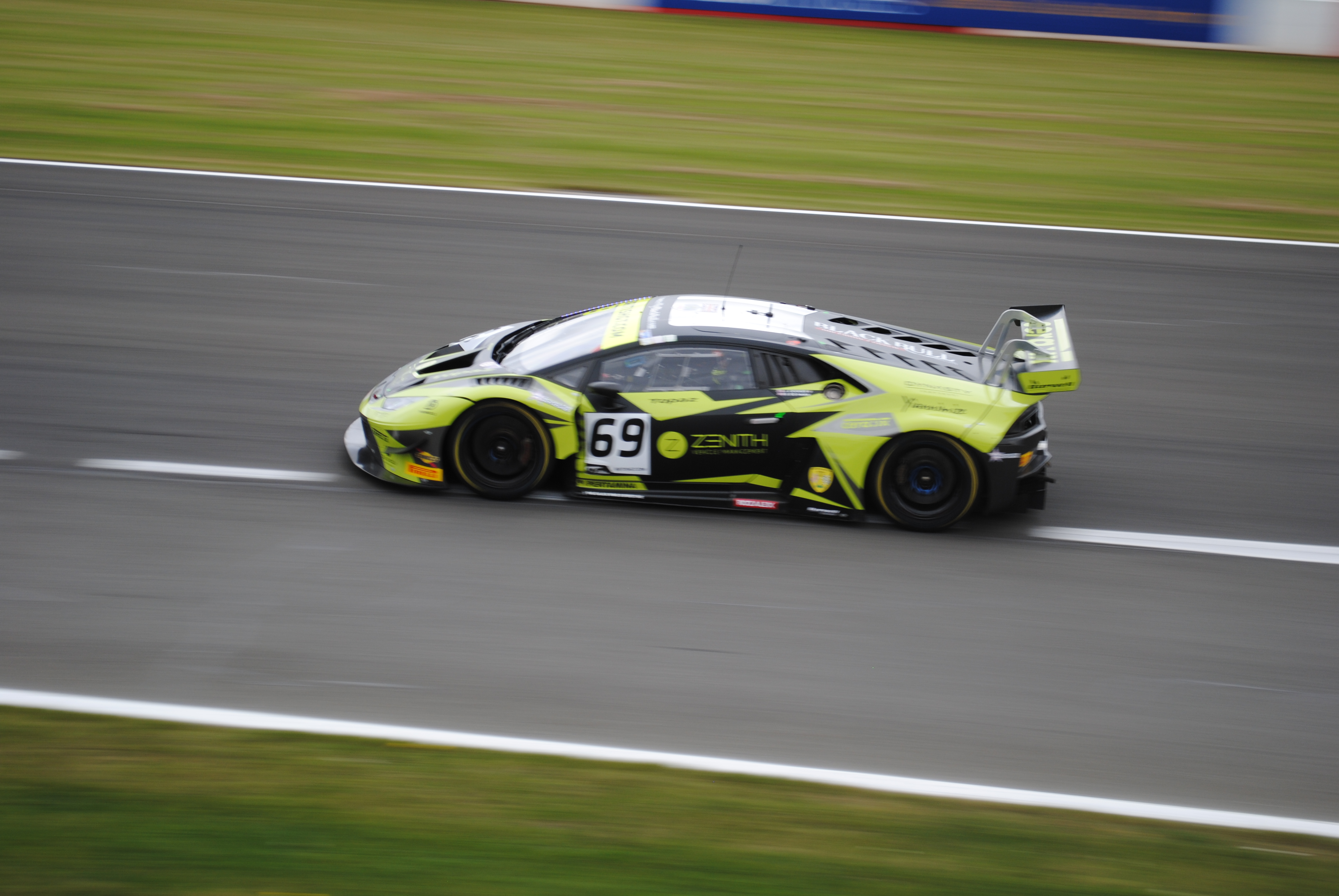
The second place drivers in the GT3 standings, Jonny Cocker and Sam De Haan.

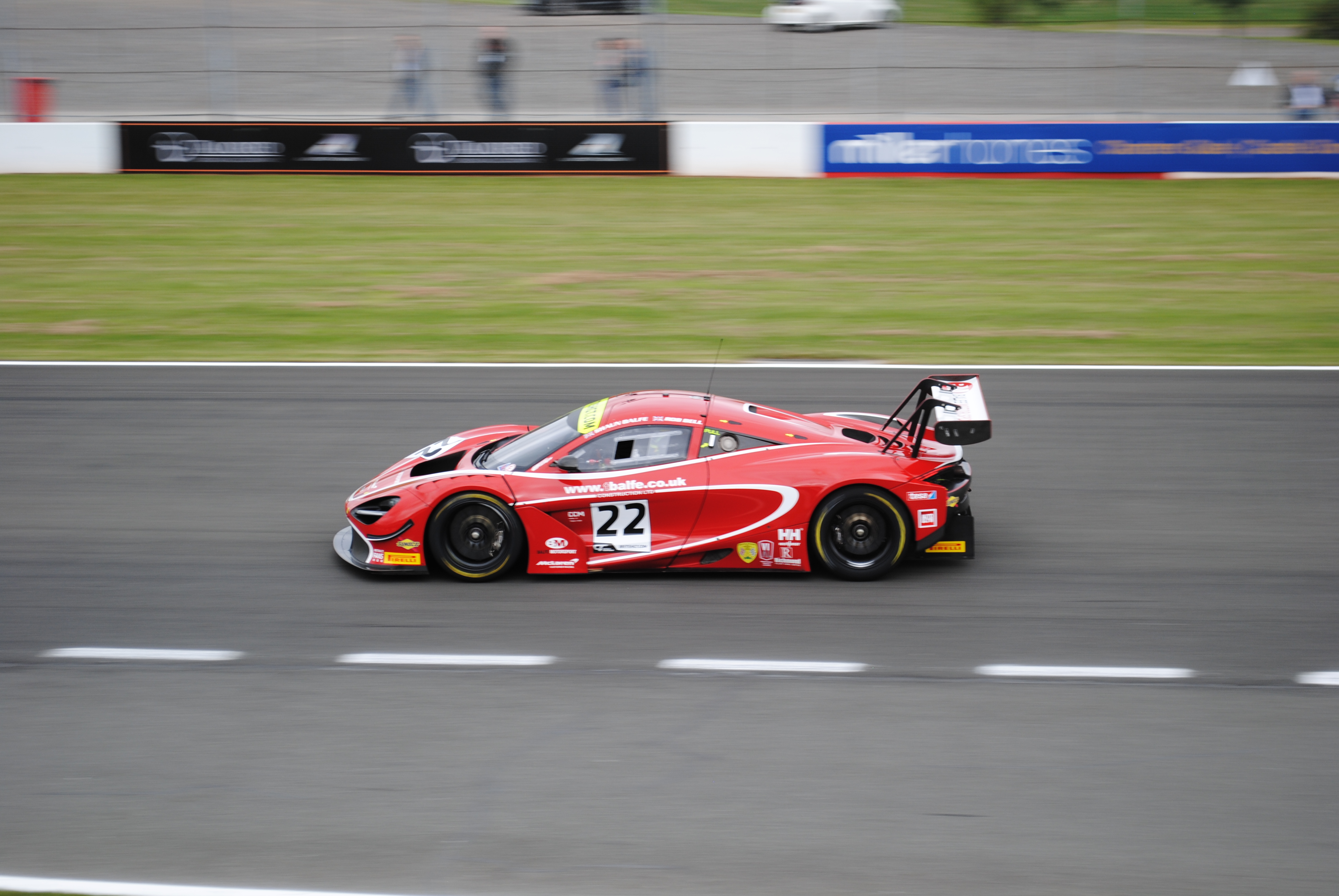
The third pace drivers in the GT3 standings, Shaun Balfe and Rob Bell.

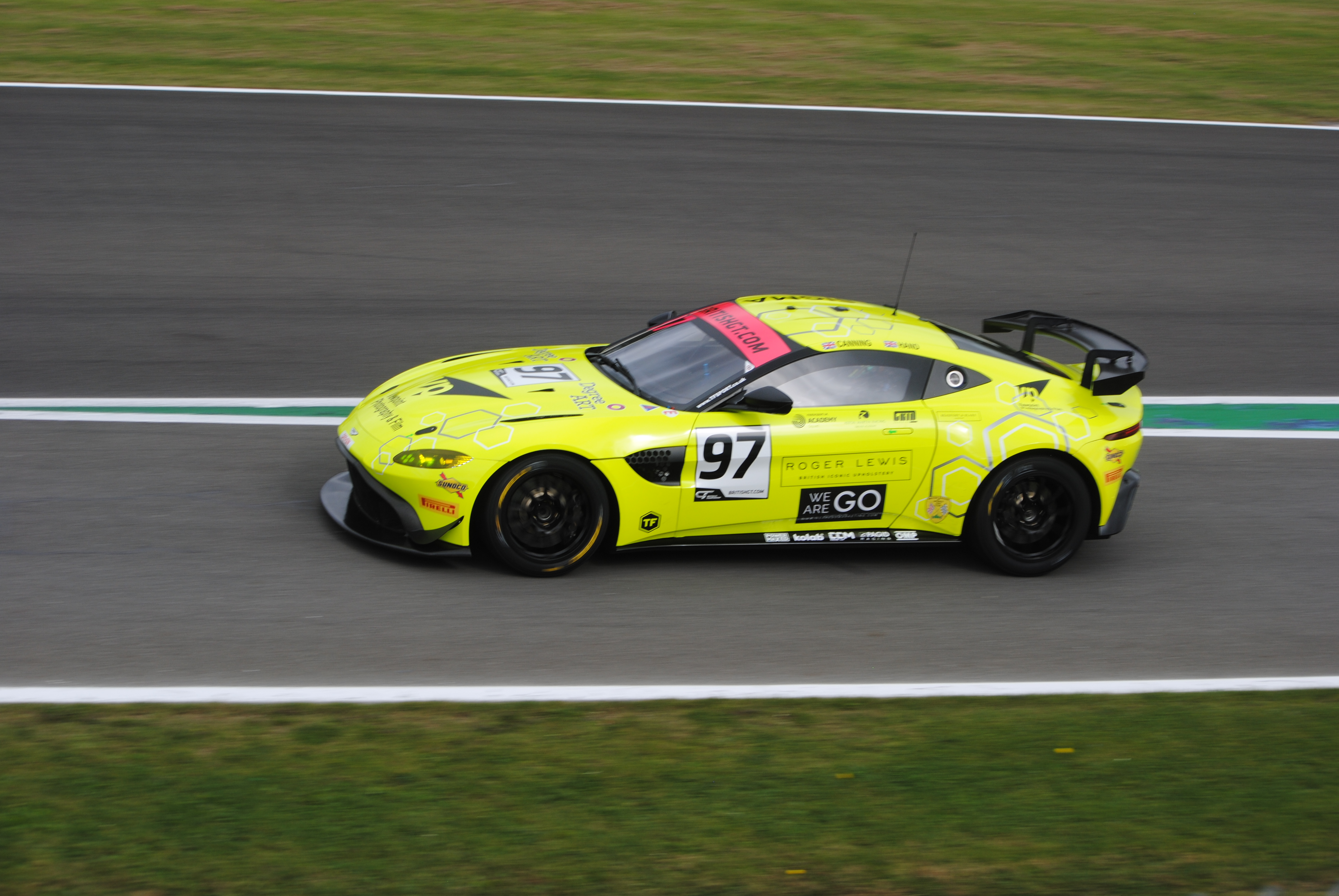
The GT4 champions, Tom Canning and Ash Hand.

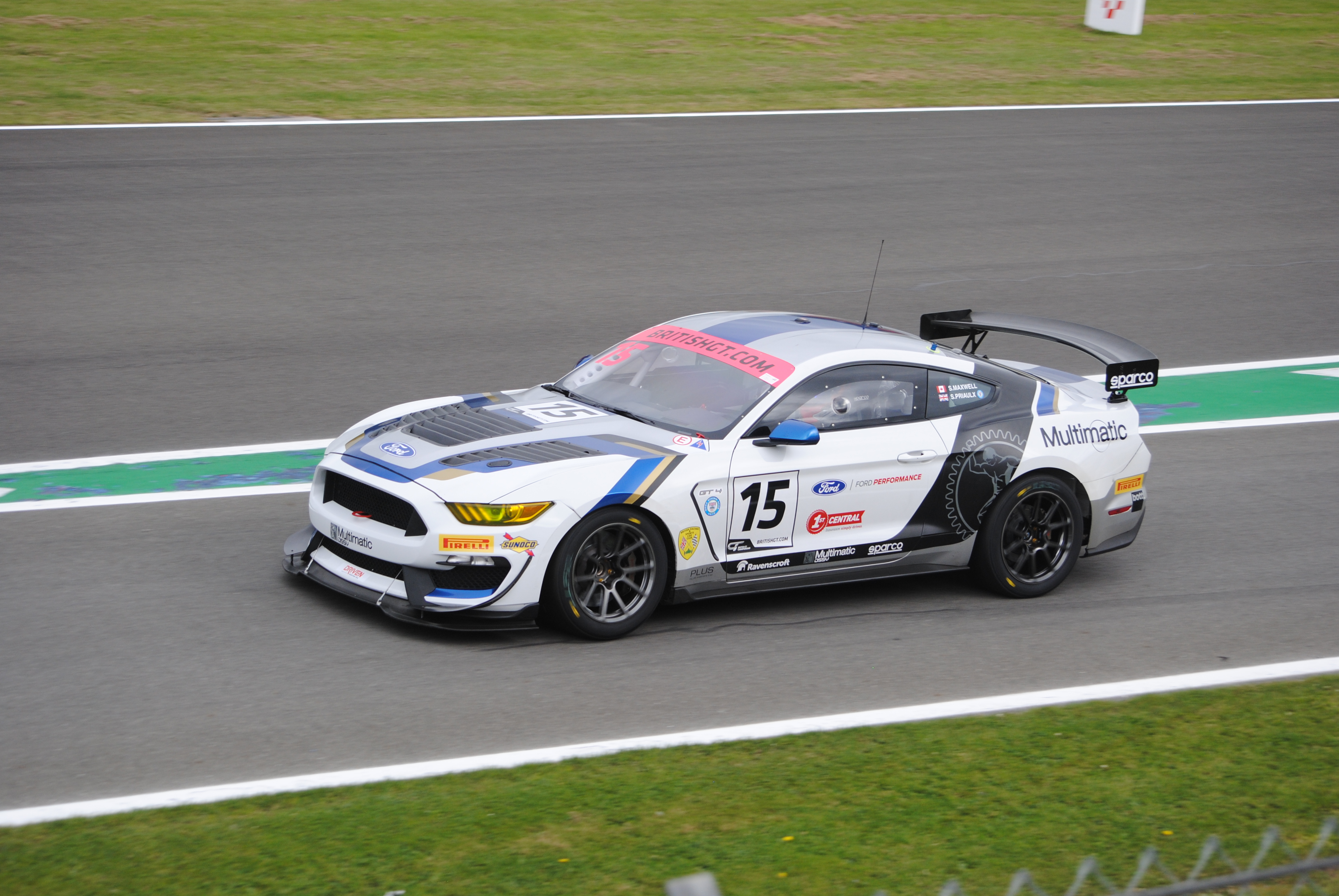
The second place drivers in the GT4 standings, Scott Maxwell and Sebastian Priaulx.

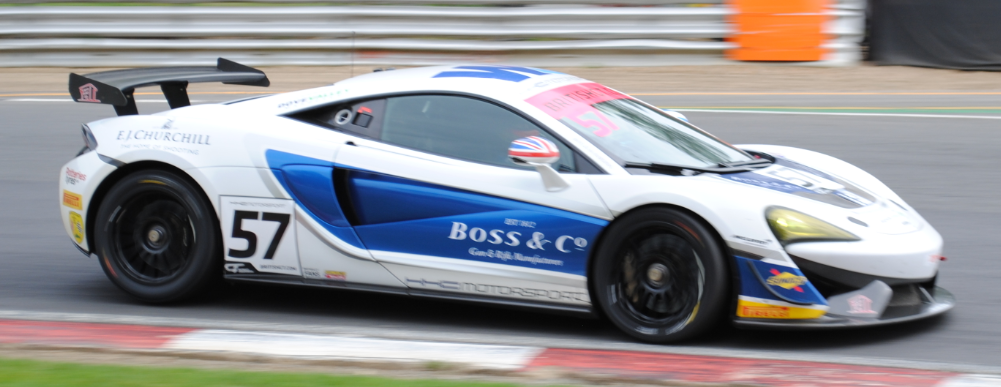
The third place drivers in the GT4 standings, Dean MacDonald and Callum Pointon.

=== Drivers' championships ===
==== Overall ====
Pos.	Drivers	Team	OUL		SNE		SIL	DON	SPA	BRH	DON	Points
GT3
1	(United Kingdom) Jonny Adam (United Kingdom) Graham Davidson	(United Kingdom) TF Sport	7	15	3	5	**9**	**1**	8	1	5	131
2	(United Kingdom) Jonny Cocker (United Kingdom) Sam De Haan	(United Kingdom) Barwell Motorsport	4	1	4	2	8	3	7	8	4	128.5
3	(United Kingdom) Shaun Balfe (United Kingdom) Rob Bell	(United Kingdom) Balfe Motorsport	WD	WD	31	3	11	2	4	**2**	**1**	126
4	(United Kingdom) Adam Balon (United Kingdom) Phil Keen	(United Kingdom) Barwell Motorsport	2	**4**	1	1	7	5	Ret	4	23	122
5	(United Kingdom) Ian Loggie (United Kingdom) Callum MacLeod	(United Kingdom) Ram Racing	**Ret**	7			1	10	2	10	2	100.5
6	(United Kingdom) Bradley Ellis (United Kingdom) Oliver Wilkinson	(United Kingdom) Optimum Motorsport	3	6	7	8	4	Ret	**1**	11	9	91.5
7	(United Kingdom) Michael Igoe (Note: Michael Igoe and Adam Wilcox were ineligible to score points at Oulton Park because their car was entered as a GTC car.)	(United Kingdom) WPI Motorsport	11	8	6	10	3	4	9	5	6	79.5
8	(United Kingdom) Mark Farmer (Denmark) Nicki Thiim	(United Kingdom) TF Sport	10	Ret	8	**4**	2	9	5	7	10	72.5
9	(Denmark) Dennis Lind	(United Kingdom) WPI Motorsport					3	4	9	5	6	70.5
10	(United Kingdom) Jack Mitchell	(United Kingdom) Century Motorsport	6	9	**11**	9	Ret	13	11	3	3	59
11	(United Kingdom) Seb Morris (United Kingdom) Rick Parfitt Jr.	(United Kingdom) JRM Racing	1	12	5	12	DSQ	7	12	9	7	58
12	(United Kingdom) Richard Neary	(United Kingdom) Team ABBA Racing	8	2	Ret	6	Ret	14	6	6	Ret	54
13	(United Kingdom) Ryan Ratcliffe	(United Kingdom) Team Parker Racing	Ret	16	2	13	6	11	3	Ret	Ret	52.5
13	(United Kingdom) Glynn Geddie	(United Kingdom) Team Parker Racing	Ret	16	2	13	6	11	3	Ret		52.5
14	(United Kingdom) Andrew Howard	(United Kingdom) Beechdean AMR	9	3	10	11	5	6		12	8	51
15	(United Kingdom) Angus Fender	(United Kingdom) Century Motorsport								3	3	45
16	(United Kingdom) Adam Christodoulou	(United Kingdom) Team ABBA Racing	8	2	Ret	6	Ret		6		Ret	42
17	(United Kingdom) Ben Green (United Kingdom) Dominic Paul	(United Kingdom) Century Motorsport	5	5	9	7	Ret	8	10	Ret	Ret	35.5
18	(Denmark) Marco Sørensen	(United Kingdom) Beechdean AMR	9	3	10	11	5					33
19	(United Kingdom) Adrian Willmott	(United Kingdom) Century Motorsport	6	9								12
19	(United Kingdom) Ross Gunn	(United Kingdom) Beechdean AMR						6				12
19	(United Kingdom) Tom Onslow-Cole	(United Kingdom) Team ABBA Racing						14		6		12
20	(United Kingdom) Adam Wilcox	(United Kingdom) WPI Motorsport	11	8	6	10						9
21	(France) Valentin Hasse-Clot	(United Kingdom) Beechdean AMR								12	8	6
22	(United Kingdom) Tom Gamble	(United Kingdom) Century Motorsport			**11**	9						2
	(United Kingdom) JM Littman	(United Kingdom) Century Motorsport					Ret	13	11			0
	(United Kingdom) Greg Caton (United Kingdom) Shamus Jennings	(United Kingdom) G-Cat Racing					35	12	34		11	0
	(United Kingdom) Jordan Witt	(United Kingdom) Team Parker Racing									Ret	
Entries ineligible to score points
	(United Kingdom) John Seale (United Kingdom) Jamie Stanley	(United Kingdom) JMH Auto					10	WD				
	(United Kingdom) Tony Quinn (United Kingdom) Darren Turner	(Belgium) M2 Competition							13			
GT4
1	(United Kingdom) Tom Canning (United Kingdom) Ashley Hand	(United Kingdom) TF Sport	Ret	27	20	15	15	19	14	15	14	140
2	(Canada) Scott Maxwell (United Kingdom) Sebastian Priaulx	(Canada) Multimatic Motorsports	**29**	**10**	**24**	18	16	**15**	19	21	13	132.5
3	(United Kingdom) Dean MacDonald (United Kingdom) Callum Pointon	(United Kingdom) HHC Motorsport	12	24	15	16	21	16	Ret	**14**	20	112
4	(United Kingdom) Jordan Collard (United Kingdom) Lewis Proctor	(United Kingdom) Tolman Motorsport	30	18	14	14	Ret	17	15	23	21	99
5	(United Kingdom) Kelvin Fletcher (United Kingdom) Martin Plowman	(United Kingdom) Beechdean AMR	18	17	21	19	14	20	23	17	15	98.5
6	(United Kingdom) James Dorlin (United Kingdom) Josh Smith	(United Kingdom) Tolman Motorsport	13	26	13	22	34	Ret	20	13	22	84.5
7	(United Kingdom) Sennan Fielding (United Kingdom) Richard Williams	(United Kingdom) Steller Performance			12	DSQ	28	27	Ret	24	**12**	62.5
8	(United Kingdom) Michael O'Brien (United Kingdom) Graham Johnson	(United Kingdom) Balfe Motorsport	19	11	18	26	25	22	17	31	19	58
9	(United Kingdom) Mike Robinson (Denmark) Patrik Matthiesen	(United Kingdom) Optimum Motorsport	Ret	22	Ret	27	17	24	18	19	16	56.5
10	(United Kingdom) Michael Broadhurst (United Kingdom) Mark Murfitt	(United Kingdom) Fox Motorsport	21	Ret	16	20	20	21	28	18	18	53
11	(United Kingdom) Nick Jones (United Kingdom) Scott Malvern	(United Kingdom) Team Parker Racing	23	14	23	**30**	12	35	22	25	30	52.5
12	(United Kingdom) Patrick Kibble (United Kingdom) Josh Price	(United Kingdom) TF Sport	16	29	22	24	**24**	34	16	Ret	17	44.5
13	(United Kingdom) Luke Williams	(United Kingdom) HHC Motorsport	14	19	17	17	23	23	24			44
13	(United Kingdom) Tom Jackson	(United Kingdom) HHC Motorsport	14	19	17	17	23	23				44
14	(United Kingdom) Matt George	(United Kingdom) Invictus Games Racing	17	13	Ret	23	30	26	21	22		31.5
15	(United Kingdom) Steve McCulley	(United Kingdom) Invictus Games Racing	17	13					21	22	28	30.5
16	(United Kingdom) Andrew Gordon-Colebrook	(United Kingdom) Century Motorsport	24	30	Ret	Ret	18	Ret	33	16	Ret	30
17	(United Kingdom) Nathan Freke	(United Kingdom) Century Motorsport								16	Ret	18
17	(United Kingdom) Chris Hoy	(Canada) Multimatic Motorsports						18	27			18
17	(United States) Billy Johnson	(Canada) Multimatic Motorsports						18				18
18	(United States) Chad McCumbee	(Canada) Multimatic Motorsports	15	20			27					16
18	(United States) Jade Buford	(Canada) Multimatic Motorsports	15	20								16
19	(United Kingdom) Angus Fender	(United Kingdom) Century Motorsport	24	30	Ret	Ret	18	Ret	33			12
20	(United Kingdom) Alex Toth-Jones (United Kingdom) Will Moore	(United Kingdom) Academy Motorsports	26	Ret	Ret	28	19	31	26	30	24	9
21	(United Kingdom) Richard Meaden (United States) Jack Rousch, Jr.	(Canada) Multimatic Motorsports								20		6
22	(Denmark) Jacob Mathiassen	(United Kingdom) Century Motorsport	22	Ret	19	31	26	DSQ	**30**	29	25	4
22	(United Kingdom) Mark Kimber	(United Kingdom) Century Motorsport	22	Ret	19	31	26	DSQ	**30**	29		4
22	(United Kingdom) Sam Smelt (Republic of Ireland) Árón Taylor-Smith	(United Kingdom) RACE Performance	25	28	25	21	Ret	30	29	26	Ret	4
23	(United Kingdom) Jack Butel (Republic of Ireland) Connor O'Brien	(United Kingdom) Optimum Motorsport	20	23	27	29	22	Ret	Ret	28	Ret	3.5
24	(United Kingdom) Sean Cooper (United Kingdom) Mike McCollum	(United Kingdom) Track Focused	31	21	32	Ret	33	28		27	DSQ	2
25	(United Kingdom) Paul Vice	(United Kingdom) Invictus Games Racing			Ret	23	30	26			28	1
	(Netherlands) Ruben Del Sarte	(United Kingdom) HHC Motorsport							24	Ret	26	0
	(Canada) Ben Hurst (Monaco) Micah Stanley	(United Kingdom) Academy Motorsports	28	25	29	Ret	Ret	25	Ret	Ret	27	0
	(United Kingdom) Ben Devlin (United Kingdom) Alistair MacKinnon	(Canada) Multimatic Motorsports			30	25						0
	(Republic of Ireland) Niall Murray	(United Kingdom) Century Motorsport									25	0
	(United Kingdom) Jordan Albert	(United Kingdom) HHC Motorsport									26	0
	(United Kingdom) Harrison Newey	(Canada) Multimatic Motorsports					27					0
	(United Kingdom) Andy Priaulx	(Canada) Multimatic Motorsports							27			0
	(United Kingdom) Dino Zamparelli	(United Kingdom) GT Marques			28	32	32	32	32	Ret	29	0
	(United Kingdom) Chris Car	(United Kingdom) GT Marques			28	32	32	32		Ret	29	0
	(United Kingdom) Brent Millage	(United Kingdom) GT Marques							32			0
	(United Kingdom) Jamie Caroline	(United Kingdom) HHC Motorsport								Ret		
	(United Kingdom) Ashley Davies (Canada) Marco Signoretti	(Canada) Multimatic Motorsports									Ret	
Entries ineligible to score points
	(United Kingdom) Peter Belshaw (Germany) Maximilian Buhk	(United Kingdom) ERC Sport					13					
	(Sweden) Erik Behrens (Sweden) Daniel Roos	(Sweden) ALFAB Racing							25			
	(Sweden) Mia Flewitt (United Kingdom) Stewart Proctor	(United Kingdom) Balfe Motorsport					31	29	31			
	(United Kingdom) Matt George (United Kingdom) James Holder	(United Kingdom) Generation AMR SuperRacing					29					
	(United Kingdom) Alexander McEwen (United Kingdom) Ross McEwen	(United Kingdom) Track Focused						33	Ret			
Pos.	Drivers	Team	OUL		SNE		SIL	DON	SPA	BRH	DON	Points

Colour	Result
Gold	Winner
Silver	Second place
Bronze	Third place
Green	Points classification
Blue	Non-points classification
Blue	Non-classified finish (NC)
Purple	Retired, not classified (Ret)
Red	Did not qualify (DNQ)
Red	Did not pre-qualify (DNPQ)
Black	Disqualified (DSQ)
White	Did not start (DNS)
White	Withdrew (WD)
White	Race cancelled (C)
Blank	Did not practice (DNP)
Blank	Did not arrive (DNA)
Blank	Excluded (EX)

**Bold** indicates pole position

==== Pro-Am Cup ====
Pos.	Drivers	Team	OUL		SNE		SIL	DON	SPA	BRH	DON	Points
GT3
1	(United Kingdom) Jonny Cocker (United Kingdom) Sam De Haan	(United Kingdom) Barwell Motorsport	4	1	**4**	2	8	3	7	8	4	154
2	(United Kingdom) Jonny Adam (United Kingdom) Graham Davidson	(United Kingdom) TF Sport	7	15	3	5	**9**	**1**	8	1	5	152
3	(United Kingdom) Shaun Balfe (United Kingdom) Rob Bell	(United Kingdom) Balfe Motorsport	WD	WD	31	3	11	2	4	**2**	**1**	141.5
4	(United Kingdom) Adam Balon (United Kingdom) Phil Keen	(United Kingdom) Barwell Motorsport	2	**4**	1	1	7	5	Ret	4	23	135.5
5	(United Kingdom) Ian Loggie (United Kingdom) Callum MacLeod	(United Kingdom) Ram Racing	**Ret**	7			1	10	1	10	2	114.5
6	(United Kingdom) Michael Igoe (Note: Michael Igoe and Adam Wilcox were ineligible to score points at Oulton Park because their car was entered as a GTC car.)	(United Kingdom) WPI Motorsport	11	8	6	10	3	4	**9**	5	6	96.5
7	(United Kingdom) Mark Farmer (Denmark) Nicki Thiim	(United Kingdom) TF Sport	10	Ret	8	**4**	2	9	5	7	10	92.5
8	(Denmark) Dennis Lind	(United Kingdom) WPI Motorsport					3	4	**9**	5	6	82.5
9	(United Kingdom) Seb Morris (United Kingdom) Rick Parfitt, Jr.	(United Kingdom) JRM Racing	1	12	5	12	DSQ	7	12	9	7	70.5
10	(United Kingdom) Andrew Howard	(United Kingdom) Beechdean AMR	9	3	10	11	5	6		12	8	65.5
11	(United Kingdom) Richard Neary	(United Kingdom) Team ABBA Racing	8	2	Ret	6	Ret	14	6	6	Ret	65
12	(United Kingdom) Adam Christodoulou	(United Kingdom) Team ABBA Racing	8	2	Ret	6	Ret		6		Ret	50
13	(United Kingdom) Ben Green (United Kingdom) Dominic Paul	(United Kingdom) Century Motorsport	5	5	9	7	Ret	8	10	Ret	Ret	46
14	(Denmark) Marco Sørensen	(United Kingdom) Beechdean AMR	9	3	10	11	5					43
15	(United Kingdom) Jack Mitchell	(United Kingdom) Century Motorsport	6	9			Ret	13	11			19
16	(United Kingdom) Adrian Willmott	(United Kingdom) Century Motorsport	6	9								16
17	(United Kingdom) Tom Onslow-Cole	(United Kingdom) Team ABBA Racing						14		6		15
18	(United Kingdom) Adam Wilcox	(United Kingdom) WPI Motorsport	11	8	6	10						14
19	(United Kingdom) Ross Gunn	(United Kingdom) Beechdean AMR						6				12
20	(France) Valentin Hasse-Clot	(United Kingdom) Beechdean AMR								12	8	10.5
21	(United Kingdom) JM Littman	(United Kingdom) Century Motorsport					Ret	13	11			3
Entries ineligible to score points
	(United Kingdom) John Seale (United Kingdom) Jamie Stanley	(United Kingdom) JMH Auto					10	WD				
	(United Kingdom) Tony Quinn (United Kingdom) Darren Turner	(Belgium) M2 Competition							13			
GT4
1	(United Kingdom) Kelvin Fletcher (United Kingdom) Martin Plowman	(United Kingdom) Beechdean AMR	**18**	17	21	19	12	20	**23**	**17**	15	214
2	(United Kingdom) Michael O'Brien (United Kingdom) Graham Johnson	(United Kingdom) Balfe Motorsport	19	11	18	26	25	22	17	31	19	170
3	(United Kingdom) Michael Broadhurst (United Kingdom) Mark Murfitt	(United Kingdom) Fox Motorsport	21	Ret	16	20	20	21	28	18	**18**	159
4	(United Kingdom) Nick Jones (United Kingdom) Scott Malvern	(United Kingdom) Team Parker Racing	23	**14**	23	**30**	**12**	**35**	22	25	30	139
5	(United Kingdom) Matt George	(United Kingdom) Invictus Games Racing	17	13	Ret	23	30	26	21	22		133
6	(United Kingdom) Steve McCulley	(United Kingdom) Invictus Games Racing	17	13					21	22		88
7	(United Kingdom) Dino Zamparelli	(United Kingdom) GT Marques			28	32	32	32	32	Ret	29	60
8	(United Kingdom) Sean Cooper (United Kingdom) Mike McCollum	(United Kingdom) Track Focused	31	21	32	Ret	33	28		27	DSQ	59
9	(United Kingdom) Chris Hoy	(Canada) Multimatic Motorsports						18	27			52.5
10	(United Kingdom) Chris Car	(United Kingdom) GT Marques			28	32	32	32		Ret	29	51
11	(United Kingdom) Paul Vice	(United Kingdom) Invictus Games Racing			Ret	23	30	26				45
12	(United States) Billy Johnson	(Canada) Multimatic Motorsports						18				37.5
13	(United Kingdom) Sennan Fielding (United Kingdom) Richard Williams	(United Kingdom) Steller Performance			**12**	DSQ						25
14	(United Kingdom) Richard Meaden (United States) Jack Rousch, Jr.	(Canada) Multimatic Motorsports								20		22.5
15	(United Kingdom) Ben Devlin (United Kingdom) Alistair MacKinnon	(Canada) Multimatic Motorsports			30	25						16
16	(United Kingdom) Andy Priaulx	(Canada) Multimatic Motorsports							27			15
17	(United Kingdom) Brent Millage	(United Kingdom) GT Marques							32			9
Entries ineligible to score points
	(United Kingdom) Peter Belshaw (Germany) Maximilian Buhk	(United Kingdom) ERC Sport					13					
	(Sweden) Erik Behrens (Sweden) Daniel Roos	(Sweden) ALFAB Racing							25			
	(United Kingdom) Matt George (United Kingdom) James Holder	(United Kingdom) Generation AMR SuperRacing					29					
	(United Kingdom) Alexander McEwan (United Kingdom) Ross McEwen	(United Kingdom) Track Focused						33	Ret			
Pos.	Drivers	Team	OUL		SNE		SIL	DON	SPA	BRH	DON	Points

==== Silver Cup ====
Pos.	Drivers	Team	OUL		SNE		SIL	DON	SPA	BRH	DON	Points
GT3
1	(United Kingdom) Bradley Ellis (United Kingdom) Oliver Wilkinson	(United Kingdom) Optimum Motorsport	3	**6**	7	8	**4**	**Ret**	**1**	**11**	9	159.5
2	(United Kingdom) Jack Mitchell	(United Kingdom) Century Motorsport			**11**	**9**				3	**3**	108.5
3	(United Kingdom) Ryan Ratcliffe	(United Kingdom) Team Parker Racing	**Ret**	16	2	13	6	11	3	Ret	Ret	94.75
3	(United Kingdom) Glynn Geddie	(United Kingdom) Team Parker Racing	**Ret**	16	2	13	6	11	3	Ret		94.75
4	(United Kingdom) Angus Fender	(United Kingdom) Century Motorsport								3		37.5
5	(United Kingdom) Tom Gamble	(United Kingdom) Century Motorsport			**11**	**9**						33
	(United Kingdom) Jordan Witt	(United Kingdom) Team Parker Racing									Ret	
GT4
1	(United Kingdom) Tom Canning (United Kingdom) Ashley Hand	(United Kingdom) TF Sport	Ret	27	20	**15**	15	19	14	15	14	165
2	(Canada) Scott Maxwell (United Kingdom) Sebastian Priaulx	(Canada) Multimatic Motorsports	**29**	**10**	**24**	18	16	**15**	19	21	13	157.5
3	(United Kingdom) Dean MacDonald (United Kingdom) Callum Pointon	(United Kingdom) HHC Motorsport	12	24	15	16	21	16	Ret	**14**	20	139
4	(United Kingdom) Jordan Collard (United Kingdom) Lewis Proctor	(United Kingdom) Tolman Motorsport	30	18	14	14	Ret	17	15	23	21	128.5
5	(United Kingdom) James Dorlin (United Kingdom) Josh Smith	(United Kingdom) Tolman Motorsport	13	26	13	22	34	Ret	20	13	22	106.5
6	(United Kingdom) Mike Robinson (Denmark) Patrik Matthiesen	(United Kingdom) Optimum Motorsport	Ret	22	Ret	27	17	24	18	19	16	97.5
7	(United Kingdom) Luke Williams	(United Kingdom) HHC Motorsport	14	19	17	17	23	23	24			84
8	(United Kingdom) Tom Jackson	(United Kingdom) HHC Motorsport	14	19	17	17	23	23				75
9	(United Kingdom) Patrick Kibble (United Kingdom) Josh Price	(United Kingdom) TF Sport	16	29	22	24	**24**	34	16	Ret	17	60.5
10	(United Kingdom) Sennan Fielding (United Kingdom) Richard Williams	(United Kingdom) Steller Performance					28	27	Ret	24	**12**	49.5
11	(United Kingdom) Andrew Gordon-Colebrook	(United Kingdom) Century Motorsport	24	30	Ret	Ret	18	Ret	33	16	Ret	40
12	(United Kingdom) Jack Butel (Republic of Ireland) Connor O'Brien	(United Kingdom) Optimum Motorsport	20	23	27	29	22	Ret	Ret	28	Ret	27.5
12	(United Kingdom) Alex Toth-Jones (United Kingdom) Will Moore	(United Kingdom) Academy Motorsports	26	Ret	Ret	28	19	31	26	30	24	27.5
13	(United States) Chad McCumbee	(Canada) Multimatic Motorsports	15	20			27					24
13	(United States) Jade Buford	(Canada) Multimatic Motorsports	15	20								24
14	(United Kingdom) Angus Fender	(United Kingdom) Century Motorsport	24	30	Ret	Ret	18	Ret	33			22
15	(United Kingdom) Sam Smelt (Republic of Ireland) Árón Taylor-Smith	(United Kingdom) RACE Performance	25	28	25	21	Ret	30	29	26	Ret	21
16	(Denmark) Jacob Mathiassen	(United Kingdom) Century Motorsport	22	Ret	19	31	26	DSQ	**30**	29	25	20.5
17	(United Kingdom) Mark Kimbern	(United Kingdom) Century Motorsport	22	Ret	19	31	26	DSQ	**30**	29		19
18	(United Kingdom) Nathan Freke	(United Kingdom) Century Motorsport								16	Ret	18
19	(Canada) Ben Hurst (Monaco) Micah Stanley	(United Kingdom) Academy Motorsports	28	25	29	Ret	Ret	25	Ret	Ret	27	13
20	(Netherlands) Ruben Del Sarte	(United Kingdom) HHC Motorsport							24	Ret	26	9
21	(Republic of Ireland) Niall Murray	(United Kingdom) Century Motorsport									25	1.5
	(United Kingdom) Jordan Albert	(United Kingdom) HHC Motorsport									26	0
	(United Kingdom) Harrison Newey	(Canada) Multimatic Motorsports					27					0
	(United Kingdom) Jamie Caroline	(United Kingdom) HHC Motorsport								Ret		
	(United Kingdom) Ashley Davies (Canada) Marco Signoretti	(Canada) Multimatic Motorsports									Ret	
Pos.	Drivers	Team	OUL		SNE		SIL	DON	SPA	BRH	DON	Points

==== Am Cup ====
Pos.	Drivers	Team	OUL	SNE	SIL	DON	SPA	BRH	DON	Points
GT3
1	(United Kingdom) Greg Caton (United Kingdom) Shamus Jennings	(United Kingdom) G-Cat Racing			**35**	**12**	**34**		**11**	75
GT4
1	(United Kingdom) Steve McCulley (United Kingdom) Paul Vice	(United Kingdom) Invictus Games Racing							**28**	18.75
Entries ineligible to score points
	(Sweden) Mia Flewitt (United Kingdom) Stewart Proctor	(United Kingdom) Balfe Motorsport			**31**	**29**	**31**			
Pos.	Drivers	Team	OUL	SNE	SIL	DON	SPA	BRH	DON	Points

==== Blancpain Trophy ====
Pos.	Drivers	Team	OUL		SNE		SIL	DON	SPA	BRH	DON	Points
1	(United Kingdom) Sam De Haan	(United Kingdom) Barwell Motorsport	3	1	**3**^{1}	2	6	3	5	7	3	159
2	(United Kingdom) Graham Davidson	(United Kingdom) TF Sport	6	10	2	5	**7**	**1**^{1}	6	1	4	157
3	(United Kingdom) Shaun Balfe	(United Kingdom) Balfe Motorsport	WD	WD	9	3	9	2	2	**2**^{1}	**1**	146.5
4	(United Kingdom) Adam Balon	(United Kingdom) Barwell Motorsport	2	**4**	1	1	5	5	Ret	3	10	134
5	(United Kingdom) Ian Loggie	(United Kingdom) Ram Racing	**Ret**^{1}	6			1^{1}	10	1	9	2	124.5
6	(United Kingdom) Michael Igoe (Note: Michael Igoe was ineligible to score points at Oulton Park because his car was entered as a GTC car.)	(United Kingdom) WPI Motorsport	10	8	5	8	3	4	**7**	4	5	96.5
7	(United Kingdom) Mark Farmer	(United Kingdom) TF Sport	9	Ret	6	**4**	2	9	3	6	8	92.5
8	(United Kingdom) Rick Parfitt, Jr.	(United Kingdom) JRM Racing	1	9	4	10	DSQ	7	10^{1}	8	6	75.5
9	(United Kingdom) Andrew Howard	(United Kingdom) Beechdean AMR	8	3	8	9	4	6		10	7	65.5
10	(United Kingdom) Richard Neary	(United Kingdom) Team ABBA Racing	7	2	Ret	6	Ret	13	4	5	Ret	65
11	(United Kingdom) Dominic Paul	(United Kingdom) Century Motorsport	4	5	7	7	Ret	8	8	Ret	Ret	46
12	(United Kingdom) Adrian Willmott	(United Kingdom) Century Motorsport	5	7								16
13	(United Kingdom) Greg Caton (United Kingdom) Shamus Jennings	(United Kingdom) G-Cat Racing					10	11	12		9	12
14	(United Kingdom) JM Littman	(United Kingdom) Century Motorsport					Ret	12	9			3
Entries ineligible to score points
	(United Kingdom) John Seale	(United Kingdom) JMH Auto					8	WD				
	(United Kingdom) Tony Quinn	(Belgium) M2 Competition							11			
Pos.	Drivers	Team	OUL		SNE		SIL	DON	SPA	BRH	DON	Points

^{1} – Driver scored 5 points for being fastest in the Am Driver Qualifying Session.

=== Teams' championship ===
Only the two best results of a team per race count towards the Teams' Championship.

Pos.	Team	Manufacturer	No.	OUL		SNE		SIL	DON	SPA	BRH	DON	Points
GT3
1	(United Kingdom) Barwell Motorsport	Lamborghini	69	4	1	4	2	8	3	7	8	4	250.5
1	(United Kingdom) Barwell Motorsport	Lamborghini	72	2	**4**	1	1	7	5	Ret	4	23	250.5
2	(United Kingdom) TF Sport	Aston Martin	2	10	Ret	8	**4**	2	9	5	7	10	203.5
2	(United Kingdom) TF Sport	Aston Martin	47	7	15	3	5	**9**	**1**	8	1	5	203.5
3	(United Kingdom) Balfe Motorsport	McLaren	22	WD	WD	31	3	11	2	4	**2**	**1**	126
4	(United Kingdom) Ram Racing	Mercedes-AMG	6	**Ret**	7			1	10	2	10	2	100.5
5	(United Kingdom) Century Motorsport	BMW	3	5	5	9	7	Ret	8	10	Ret	Ret	94.5
5	(United Kingdom) Century Motorsport	BMW	9	6	9	**11**	9	Ret	13	11	3	3	94.5
6	(United Kingdom) Optimum Motorsport	Aston Martin	96	3	6	7	8	4	Ret	**1**	11	9	91.5
7	(United Kingdom) WPI Motorsport (Note: The No. 18 WPI Motorsport car was ineligible to score championship points at Oulton Park because it was entered in the GTC class.)	Porsche; Lamborghini	18	11	8	6	10	3	4	9	5	6	79.5
8	(United Kingdom) JRM Racing	Bentley	31	1	12	5	12	DSQ	7	12	9	7	58
9	(United Kingdom) Team ABBA Racing	Mercedes-AMG	8	8	2	Ret	6	Ret	14	6	6	Ret	54
10	(United Kingdom) Team Parker Racing	Bentley	7	Ret	16	2	13	6	11	3	Ret	Ret	52.5
11	(United Kingdom) Beechdean AMR	Aston Martin	99	9	3	10	11	5	6		12	8	51
	(United Kingdom) G-Cat Racing	Porsche	33					35	12	34		11	0
Entries ineligible to score points
	(United Kingdom) JMH Auto	Lamborghini	55					10	WD				
	(Belgium) M2 Competition	Aston Martin	37							13			
GT4
1	(United Kingdom) TF Sport	Aston Martin	95	16	29	22	24	**24**	34	16	Ret	17	184.5
1	(United Kingdom) TF Sport	Aston Martin	97	Ret	27	20	15	15	19	14	15	14	184.5
2	(United Kingdom) Tolman Motorsport	McLaren	4	13	26	13	22	34	Ret	20	13	22	183.5
2	(United Kingdom) Tolman Motorsport	McLaren	5	30	18	14	14	Ret	17	15	23	21	183.5
3	(Canada) Multimatic Motorsports	Ford	15	**29**	**10**	**24**	18	16	**15**	19	21	13	156
3	(Canada) Multimatic Motorsports	Ford	19	15	20	30	25	27	18	27	20	Ret	156
4	(United Kingdom) HHC Motorsport	McLaren	57	12	24	15	16	21	16	Ret	**14**	20	156
4	(United Kingdom) HHC Motorsport	McLaren	58	14	19	17	17	23	23	24	Ret	26	156
5	(United Kingdom) Beechdean AMR	Aston Martin	11	18	17	21	19	14	20	23	17	15	98.5
6	(United Kingdom) Steller Performance	Audi	29			12	DSQ	28	27	Ret	24	**12**	62.5
7	(United Kingdom) Optimum Motorsport	Aston Martin	35	20	23	27	29	22	Ret	Ret	28	Ret	60
7	(United Kingdom) Optimum Motorsport	Aston Martin	75	Ret	22	Ret	27	17	24	18	19	16	60
8	(United Kingdom) Balfe Motorsport (Note: The No. 21 Balfe Motorsport car was ineligible to score points as it was not a full season entrant)	McLaren	20	19	11	18	26	25	22	17	31	19	58
8	(United Kingdom) Balfe Motorsport	McLaren	21					31	29	31			58
9	(United Kingdom) Fox Motorsport	Mercedes-AMG	77	21	Ret	16	20	20	21	28	18	18	53
10	(United Kingdom) Team Parker Racing	Mercedes-AMG	66	23	14	23	**20**	12	35	22	25	30	52.5
11	(United Kingdom) Century Motorsport	BMW	42	22	Ret	19	31	26	DSQ	**30**	29	25	34
11	(United Kingdom) Century Motorsport	BMW	43	24	30	Ret	Ret	18	Ret	33	16	Ret	34
12	(United Kingdom) Invictus Games Racing	Jaguar	44	17	13	Ret	23	30	26	21	22	28	31.5
13	(United Kingdom) Academy Motorsports	Aston Martin; McLaren (Note: Academy Motorsport ran the No. 61 car as a McLaren 570S GT4 at the Spa-Francorchamps round.)	61	28	25	29	Ret	Ret	25	Ret	Ret	27	9
13	(United Kingdom) Academy Motorsports	Aston Martin; McLaren	62	26	Ret	Ret	28	19	31	26	30	24	9
14	(United Kingdom) RACE Performance	Ford	23	25	28	25	21	Ret	30	29	26	Ret	4
15	(United Kingdom) Track Focused (Note: The No. 74 Track Focused car was ineligible to score points as it was not a full season entrant)	KTM	32	31	21	32	Ret	33	28		27	DSQ	2
15	(United Kingdom) Track Focused	KTM	74						33	Ret			2
	(United Kingdom) GT Marques	Porsche	88			28	32	32	32	32	Ret	29	0
Entries ineligible to score points
	(United Kingdom) ERC Sport	Mercedes-AMG	30					13					
	(Sweden) ALFAB Racing	McLaren	52							25			
	(United Kingdom) Generation AMR SuperRacing	Aston Martin	14					29					
Pos.	Team	Manufacturer	No.	OUL		SNE		SIL	DON	SPA	BRH	DON	Points
