= Callum MacLeod =

British race car driver (born 1988)

Callum Macleod
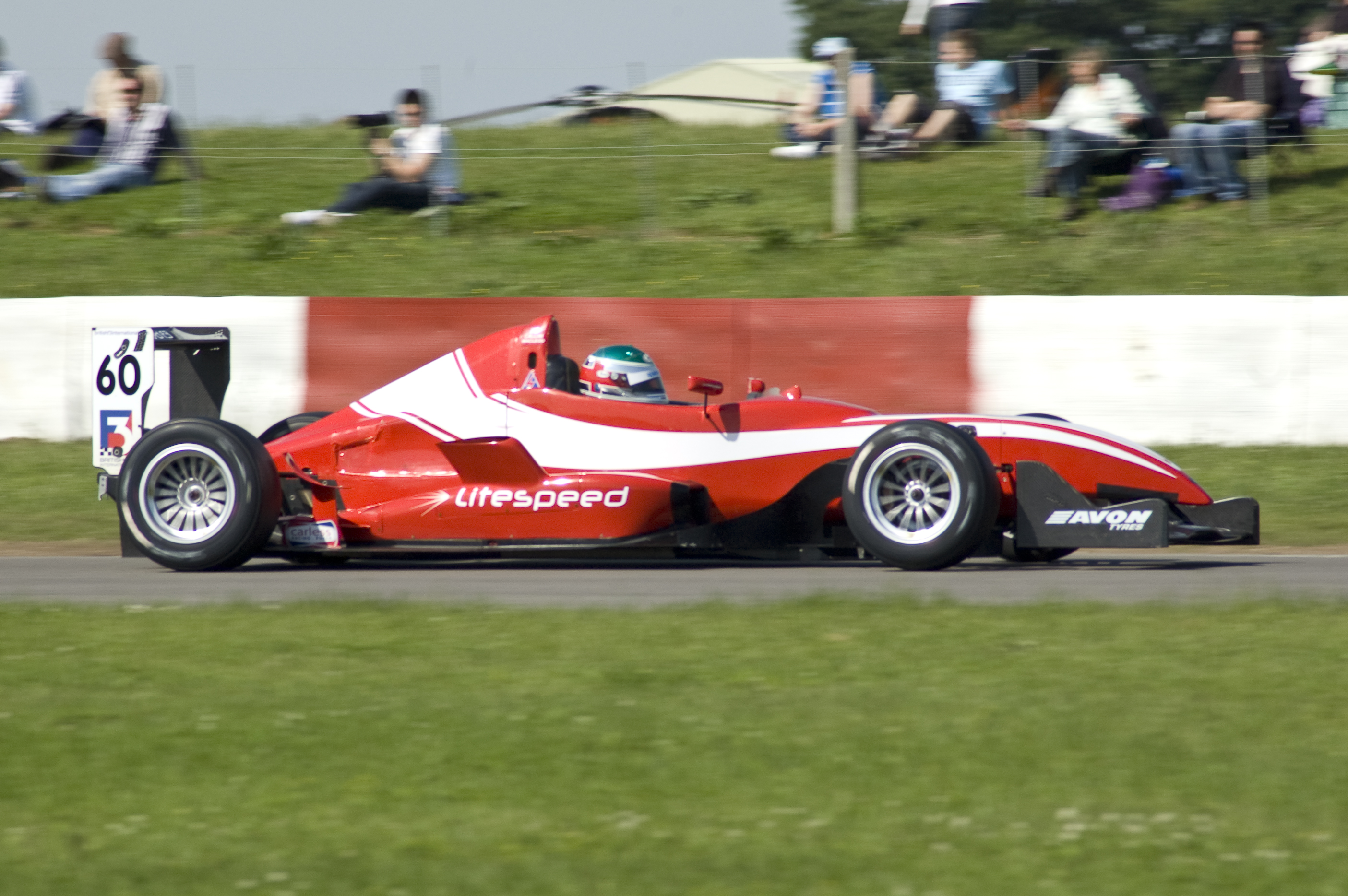
- MacLeod at the Snetterton Circuit in 2008
- Nationality: (United Kingdom) British
- Born: Callum Peter MacLeod; 20 January 1988 (age 38) Gloucester, England

GP3 Series career
- Debut season: 2011
- Current team: Carlin Motorsport
- Categorisation: FIA Silver (until 2016); FIA Gold (2017–)
- Car number: 15
- Starts: 0
- Wins: 0
- Poles: 0
- Fastest laps: 0

Previous series
- 2009-10 2008 2006–07 2005: European F3 Open; British Formula 3 Championship; British Formula Ford; Formula BMW UK

Championship titles
- 2009 2007: European F3 Open Copa; British Formula Ford

Callum Peter MacLeod (born 20 January 1988) is a professional British race car driver who drives in the British G.T. Championship. He also won the 2007 British Formula Ford Championship and the 2009 European F3 Open Championship. He was born in Northampton.

== Racing career highlights ==
- Runner up in European F3 Open 2010
- European F3 Open Copa Champion 2009
- British Formula Ford champion 2007
- Runner up in Formula Ford Festival – Duratec class 2007

== Karting career highlights ==
Super 1 National Rotax Junior champion 2003.

== Racing record ==
=== Career summary ===
Season	Series	Team	Races	Wins	Poles	F/Laps	Podiums	Points	Position
2005	Formula BMW UK	Filcell Motorsport	14	0	0	0	0	2	23rd
2006	British Formula Ford Championship - Clubman	Marque Cars Racing	6	4	6	?	4	158	7th
2007	British Formula Ford Championship	Jamun Racing	24	14	17	19	23	680	**1st**
2007	Formula Ford Festival	Jamun Racing	1	0	0	1	1	N/A	**2nd**
2008	British Formula 3 International Series - National	T-Sport	2	0	0	0	0	9	14th
2008	British Formula 3 International Series - National	Litespeed F3	2	0	0	1	0	9	14th
2008	Porsche Carrera Cup Great Britain	Porsche Motorsport	2	0	0	0	0	0	NC†
2009	European F3 Open Championship	Team West-Tec	16	0	0	0	1	41	9th
2010	European F3 Open Championship	Motul Team West-Tec	14	3	1	1	8	112	**2nd**
2011	GP3 Series	Carlin Motorsport	8	0	0	1	0	3	23rd
2014	Radical European Masters - Masters		2	0	0	0	0	0	NC
2015	Blancpain Endurance Series - Am	Team Parker Racing	1	1	1	0	1	49	7th
2015	International GT Open - Pro-Am	Team Parker Racing	1	0	0	0	0	0	20th
2015	British GT Championship - GT3	Team Parker Racing	1	0	0	0	0	0	31st
2016	Lamborghini Super Trofeo Europe - Pro-Am	Antonelli Motorsport	2	0	0	0	0	6	17th
2016	British GT Championship - GT3	Team Parker Racing	1	0	0	0	0	0	27th
2017	British GT Championship - GT3	Team Parker Racing	10	1	0	1	1	66	8th
2018	Blancpain GT Series Sprint Cup	Team Parker Racing	2	0	0	0	0	0	NC
2018	International GT Open	Team Parker Racing	2	0	0	0	0	0	51st
2018	British GT Championship - GT3	Team Parker Racing	9	0	0	0	1	72	9th
2019	Blancpain GT Series Endurance Cup	Bentley Team M-Sport	2	0	0	0	0	9	26th
2019	Blancpain GT Series Endurance Cup	M-Sport Team Bentley	1	0	0	0	0	9	26th
2019	Intercontinental GT Challenge	M-Sport Team Bentley	1	0	0	0	0	0	NC
2019	British GT Championship - GT3	Ram Racing	7	1	1	1	3	100.5	5th
2019	GT4 South European Series	Bullitt Racing	4	0	0	0	3	0	NC†
2020	GT World Challenge Europe Endurance Cup	Ram Racing	1	0	0	0	0	0	NC
2020	International GT Open	Ram Racing	2	0	0	0	1	10	18th
2021	GT World Challenge Europe Endurance Cup	Ram Racing	1	0	0	0	0	0	NC
2021	GT Cup Championship - GTH	Balfe Motorsport	21	2	0	0	8	292	**3rd**
2022	British GT Championship - GT3	Ram Racing	5	1	1	0	2	69.5	9th
2022	GT Cup Championship - GT3	Ram Racing							
2023	British GT Championship - GT3	Greystone GT							
2024	British GT Championship - GT3	Greystone GT							
2025	British GT Championship - GT3	Optimum Motorsport							
2026	British GT Championship - GT3	Optimum Motorsport							

† As he was a guest driver, MacLeod was ineligible to score points.

=== Complete GP3 Series results ===
(key) (Races in bold indicate pole position) (Races in italics indicate fastest lap)

Year	Entrant	1	2	3	4	5	6	7	8	9	10	11	12	13	14	15	16	DC	Points
2011	Carlin	IST; FEA	IST; SPR	CAT; FEA	CAT; SPR	VAL; FEA	VAL; SPR	SIL; FEA	SIL; SPR	NÜR; FEA; 29	NÜR; SPR; 21	HUN; FEA; 26	HUN; SPR; 18	SPA; FEA; Ret	SPA; SPR; Ret	MNZ; FEA; 11	MNZ; SPR; 5	23rd	3

=== Complete British GT Championship results ===
(key) (Races in bold indicate pole position) (Races in italics indicate fastest lap)

Year	Team	Car	Class	1	2	3	4	5	6	7	8	9	10	DC	Points
2015	Team Parker Racing	Audi R8 LMS Ultra	GT3	OUL; 1	OUL; 2	ROC	SIL	SPA; Ret	BRH	SNE; 1	SNE; 2	DON		NC	0
2016	Team Parker Racing	Bentley Continental GT3	GT3	BRH	ROC	OUL; 1	OUL; 2	SIL; Ret	SPA; DNS	SNE; 1	SNE; 2	DON		NC	0
2017	Team Parker Racing	Bentley Continental GT3	GT3	OUL; 1; 7	OUL; 2 DSQ	ROC; 9	SNE; 1; 9	SNE; 2 Ret	SIL; 26	BRH; 8	DON; 6			8th	75
2018	Team Parker Racing	Bentley Continental GT3	GT3	OUL; 1; 7	OUL; 2; 5	ROC; 2	SNE; 1; 9	SNE; 2 Ret	SIL; 12	SPA; 6	BRH; 7	DON; 8		9th	72
2019	RAM Racing	Mercedes-AMG GT3	GT3	OUL; 1 Ret	OUL; 2; 7	SNE; 1	SNE; 2	SIL; 1	DON; 1; 10	SPA; 2	BRH; 10	DON; 1; 2		5th	100.5
2022	RAM Racing	Mercedes-AMG GT3 Evo	GT3	OUL; 1	OUL; 2	SIL; 27	DON; 1; 3	**SNE**; **1**; **1**	SNE; 2; 6	SPA	BRH; 6	DON		9th	69.5
2023	Greystone GT	Mercedes-AMG GT3 Evo	GT3	OUL; 1; 17	OUL; 2; 14	SIL; 8	DON; Ret	SNE; 1; 13	SNE; 2; 6	ALG	BRH; 12	DON		14th*	14*

^{†} Driver did not finish, but was classified as he completed 90% race distance.
^{*} Season still in progress.

Sporting positions
Preceded by Nathan Freke	British Formula Ford; Champion; 2007	Succeeded by Wayne Boyd
Preceded by Natacha Gachnang	European F3 Open; Copa Champion; 2009	Succeeded by Noel Jammal
