= Ollie Wilkinson (racing driver) =

British racing driver (born 1996)

Oliver Wilkinson
- Nationality: (United Kingdom) British
- Born: 25 May 1996 (age 30) Leeds, England
- Categorisation: FIA Silver (until 2020); FIA Gold (2021–)

Championship titles
- 2019: British GT Championship – GT3 Silver

Oliver Peter Wilkinson (born 25 May 1996) is a British racing driver who last competed in GT World Challenge Europe Endurance Cup for Jota Sport as a McLaren factory driver.

== Career ==
Wilkinson began his racing career in 2015, racing in the Caterham Roadsport Championship. After making a one-off appearance in the Ginetta GT5 Challenge in 2016, Wilkinson joined Optimum Motorsport to race in the series full-time the following year. In his only season in the series, Wilkinson qualified on pole at Oulton Park, Rockingham and Silverstone, as well as six podiums to secure a third-place points finish. During 2017, Wilkinson also raced with the team in one-off appearances in both the 24H Series and International GT Open, most notably scoring a Pro-Am class win in the latter at Barcelona.

The following year, Wilkinson remained with Audi-fielding Optimum Motorsport for his maiden full-time season in International GT Open alongside Bradley Ellis in Pro-Am. Competing in all but one round, Wilkinson took class wins at Spa and Silverstone, as well as scoring two other podiums to take fourth in points. During 2018, Wilkinson also raced with the same team for one-off appearance in the GT Cup Championship, as well as racing in the Gulf 12 Hours for Aston Martin Racing in GT4.

With Optimum switching to Aston Martin for 2019, Wilkinson joined them for a dual campaign in both International GT Open and the British GT Championship, as a candidate for the Aston Martin Racing Driver Academy. In the former, Wilkinson began the season with a Pro-Am podium at Le Castellet, before switching to the Pro class for the rest of the year, scoring a lone outright win at the Red Bull Ring with Jonny Adam and a pair of third-place finishes with Darren Turner to end the year sixth in the standings. Partnering Bradley Ellis in the GT3 Silver class of the latter, Wilkinson took a lone outright win at Spa, four other class wins and three other podiums to clinch the class title at season's end.

Joining the McLaren factory roster for 2020, Wilkinson signed on for a dual campaign in the British GT Championship and the GT World Challenge Europe Endurance Cup in what would be Optimum's third brand allegiance in as many years. In the former, Wilkinson scored three class podiums, including an overall second-place finish at Oulton Park, en route to fifth in the GT3 Silver standings. Competing for overall honors in the latter, Wilkinson scored a best result of eighth at Imola as he ended the year 24th in points after skipping the finale at Le Castellet.

In 2021, Wilkinson joined series newcomers Jota Sport to race in both the GT World Challenge Europe Endurance and Sprint Cups alongside fellow factory drivers Ben Barnicoat and Rob Bell. In the former, Wilkinson scored only one points finish, a seventh-place finish at the 24 Hours of Spa to end the year 18th in points, despite missing the Nürburgring race as he felt unwell following a crash in the Sprint Cup's Brands Hatch round. In the latter, Wilkinson took a pair of fourth-place finishes at Magny-Cours and Valencia en route to a 17th-place points finish. Continuing with Jota for a dual campaign in both series for the following year, Wilkinson scored a best result of eighth at the 24 Hours of Spa with Bell and Marvin Kirchhöfer in the former, whilst his Sprint Cup season ended abruptly following a pre-qualifying crash at Magny-Cours.

== Racing record ==
=== Racing career summary ===
Season	Series	Team	Races	Wins	Poles	F/Laps	Podiums	Points	Position
2015	Caterham Roadsport Championship		9	0	0	0	0	87	19th
2016	Ginetta GT5 Challenge		3	0	0	0	0	0	NC
2017	Ginetta GT5 Challenge	Optimum Motorsport	19	0	3	5	6		**3rd**
2017	24H Series – SP3-GT4	Optimum Motorsport	1	0	0	0	0	0	NC
2017	International GT Open – Pro-Am	Optimum Motorsport	2	1	0	0	1	0	NC†
2018	24H GT Series – A6	Optimum Motorsport	0	0	0	0	0	0	NC
2018	International GT Open	Optimum Motorsport	12	0	0	0	0	14	23rd
2018	International GT Open – Pro-Am	Optimum Motorsport	12	2	0	0	4	48	4th
2018	Ginetta GT5 Challenge	Optimum Motorsport	2	0	1	0	0	0	NC
2018	Radical SR1 Cup	Radical Works Team	2	0	0	0	0	54	14th
2018	Gulf 12 Hours – GT4	Aston Martin Racing	1	0	0	0	0	—N/a	4th
2019	British GT Championship – GT3 Silver	Optimum Motorsport	9	5	5	0	8	159.5	**1st**
2019	International GT Open	Optimum Motorsport	12	1	0	0	3	62	6th
2019	International GT Open – Pro-Am	Optimum Motorsport	2	0	0	0	1	10	16th
2020	GT World Challenge Europe Endurance Cup	Optimum Motorsport	3	0	0	0	0	5	24th
2020	British GT Championship – GT3 Silver	Optimum Motorsport	9	0	1	0	3	129	5th
2021	GT World Challenge Europe Endurance Cup	Jota Sport	4	0	0	0	0	13	18th
2021	GT World Challenge Europe Sprint Cup	Jota Sport	7	0	0	0	0	19	17th
2022	GT World Challenge Europe Endurance Cup	Jota Sport	5	0	0	0	0	10	27th
2022	GT World Challenge Europe Sprint Cup	Jota Sport	2	0	0	0	0	0.5	23rd

^{†} As Wilkinson was a guest driver, he was ineligible to score points.

=== Complete International GT Open results ===
Year	Team	Car	Class	1	2	3	4	5	6	7	8	9	10	11	12	13	14	Pos.	Points
2017	Optimum Motorsport	Audi R8 LMS	Pro-Am	EST; 1	EST; 2	SPA; 1	SPA; 2	LEC; 1	LEC; 2	HUN; 1	HUN; 2	SIL; 1	SIL; 2	MNZ; 1	MNZ; 2	CAT; 1; 7	CAT; 2; 2	NC†	0†
2018	Optimum Motorsport	Audi R8 LMS	Pro-Am	EST; 1; 4	EST; 2; 7	LEC; 1	LEC; 2	SPA; 1; 3	SPA; 2; 1	HUN; 1; 6	HUN; 2; 5	SIL; 1; 1	SIL; 2; 5	MNZ; 1 Ret	MNZ; 2 Ret	CAT; 1; 9	CAT; 2; 2	4th	48
2019	Optimum Motorsport	Aston Martin Vantage AMR GT3	Pro-Am	LEC; 1; 6	LEC; 2; 2													16th	10
2019	Optimum Motorsport	Aston Martin Vantage AMR GT3	Pro			HOC; 1; 8	HOC; 2; 3	SPA; 1	SPA; 2	RBR; 1; 6	RBR; 2; 1	SIL; 1 Ret	SIL; 2; 7	CAT; 1 Ret	CAT; 2; 5	MNZ; 1; 3	MNZ; 2; 7	6th	62

=== Complete British GT Championship results ===
(key) (Races in bold indicate pole position) (Races in italics indicate fastest lap)

Year	Team	Car	Class	1	2	3	4	5	6	7	8	9	Pos	Points
2019	Optimum Motorsport	Aston Martin Vantage AMR GT3	GT3 Silver	OUL; 1; 3	**OUL**; **2**; 6	SNE; 1; 7	SNE; 2; 8	**SIL**; 4	**DON1**; Ret	**SPA**; 1	**BRH**; 11	DON2; 9	1st	159.5
2020	Optimum Motorsport	McLaren 720S GT3	GT3 Silver	**OUL**; **1**; 2	OUL; 2; 5	DON1; 1; 9	DON1; 2; 4	BRH; 10	DON2; 5	SNE; 1; 3	SNE; 2; 7	SIL; 13	5th	129

=== Complete GT World Challenge Europe results ===
==== GT World Challenge Europe Endurance Cup ====
Year	Team	Car	Class	1	2	3	4	5	6	7	Pos.	Points
2020	Optimum Motorsport	McLaren 720S GT3	Pro	IMO; 8	NÜR; 11	SPA; 6H; 51	SPA; 12H; 46	SPA; 24H; Ret	LEC		24th	5
2021	Jota Sport	McLaren 720S GT3	Pro	MNZ; Ret	LEC; 16	SPA; 6H; 4	SPA; 12H; 9	SPA; 24H; 7	NÜR; DNS	CAT; 13	18th	13
2022	Jota Sport	McLaren 720S GT3	Pro	IMO; 10	LEC; Ret	SPA; 6H; 9	SPA; 12H; 7	SPA; 24H; 8	HOC; Ret	CAT; 10	27th	10

==== GT World Challenge Europe Sprint Cup ====
(key) (Races in bold indicate pole position) (Races in italics indicate fastest lap)

Year	Team	Car	Class	1	2	3	4	5	6	7	8	9	10	Pos.	Points
2021	Jota Sport	McLaren 720S GT3	Pro	MAG; 1; 13	MAG; 2; 4	ZAN; 1	ZAN; 2	MIS; 1; 22	MIS; 2; 8	BRH; 1 Ret	BRH; 2 DNS	VAL; 1; 22†	VAL; 2; 4	17th	19
2022	Jota Sport	McLaren 720S GT3	Pro	BRH; 1; 12	BRH; 2; 10	MAG; 1 WD	MAG; 2 WD	ZAN; 1	ZAN; 2	MIS; 1	MIS; 2	VAL; 1	VAL; 2	23rd	0.5
