= Tom Wood (racing driver) =

British racing driver (born 2001)

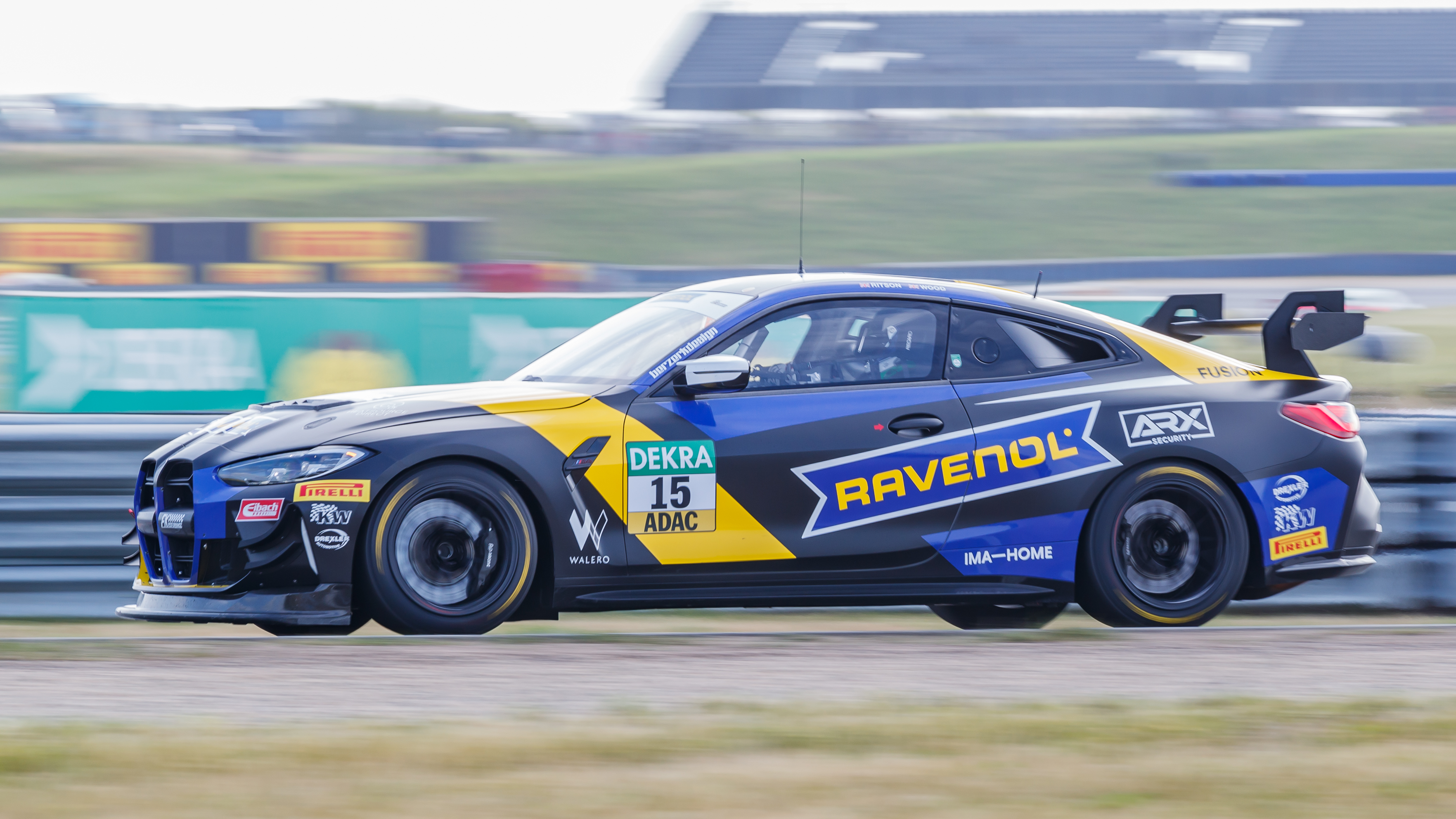
- Wood in 2023
- Nationality: (United Kingdom) British
- Born: 2 November 2001 (age 25) Castle Donington, England
- Categorisation: FIA Silver

Championship titles
- 2025: British GT Championship – GT3 Silver-Am

Tom Wood (born 2 November 2001) is a British racing driver who last competed for Orange Racing by JMH in the British GT Championship.

== Career ==
Wood began karting in 2008, competing until 2015. In his time in karts, Wood most notably won the 2014 LGM Series in IAME Cadet, before clinching the Formula Kart Stars title and winning the Kartmasters British GP in Junior karts the following year.

Stepping up to cars in 2016, Wood joined Elite Motorsport to compete in the Ginetta Junior Championship. In his first season in the series, Wood took a best result of second in race two at Rockingham and a third place-finish in race two at Knockhill to end the year 11th in points. Switching to HHC Motorsport for 2017, Wood took his only series win at Snetterton and eight other podiums to take fifth in points. The following year, Wood joined Aston Martin-fielding Academy Motorsport to race in the GT4 class of the British GT Championship. After finishing ninth in the GT4 Silver points, Wood switched to the team's GT4 European Series programme in 2019, as a candidate for the AMR Driver Academy. Dabbling between the Pro-Am and Silver classes in his only season in the series, Wood scored two class podiums in the former at Brands Hatch en route to a tenth-place points finish.

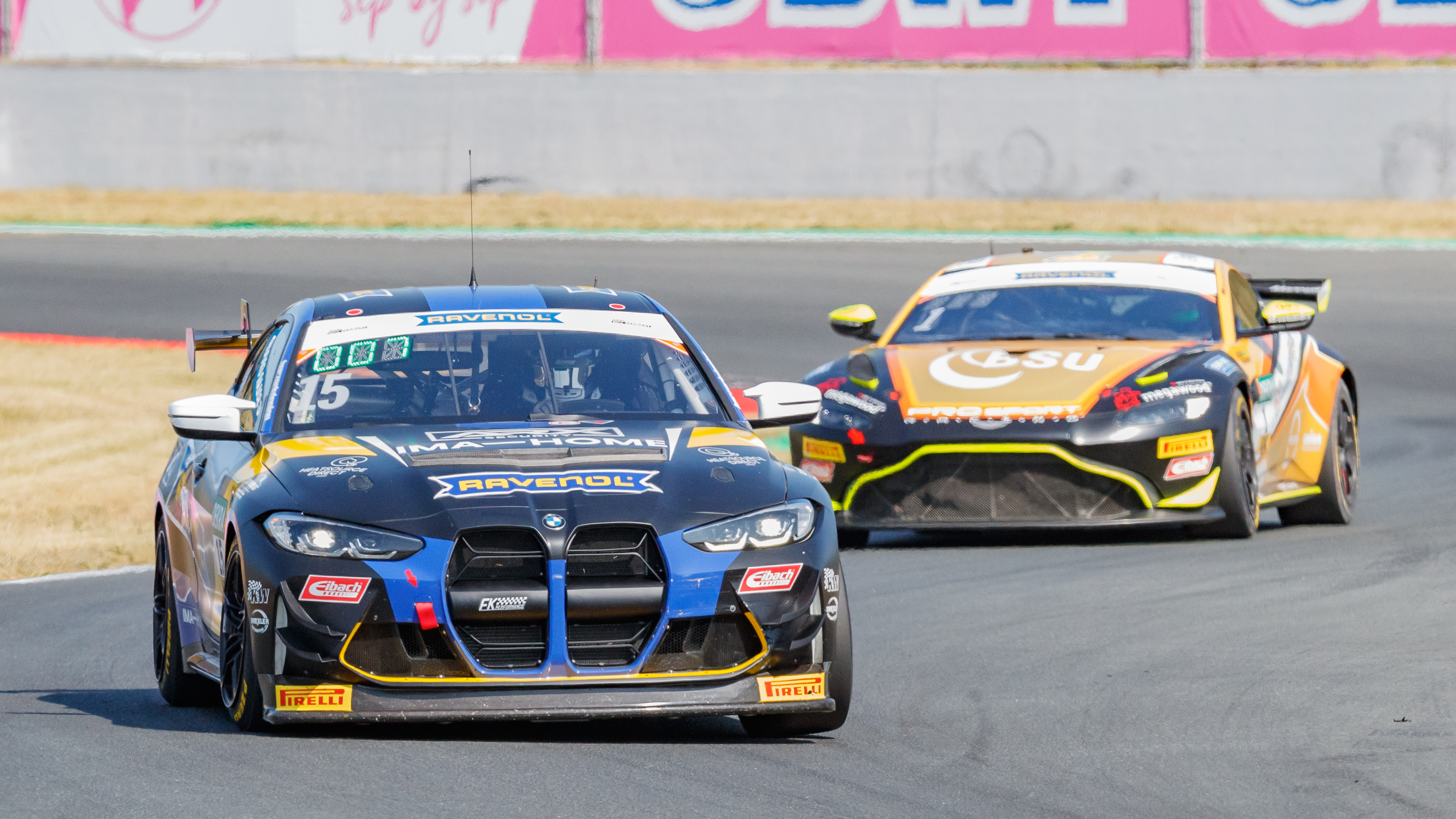
Wood's No. 15 BMW leading the No. 1 Aston Martin at Oschersleben in ADAC GT4 Germany in 2023.

Two seasons of select appearances in the Nürburgring Langstrecken-Serie for BMW-linked Walkenhorst Motorsport in Cup 5 then followed, before joining Aston Martin-fielding Racing One for the 2022 ADAC GT4 Germany season. In his rookie season in the series, Wood scored a best result of second at Oschersleben from pole, as well as a pair of third-place finishes at the Red Bull Ring and Hockenheimring to take eighth in the overall standings. Wood then switched to BMW customer team FK Performance Motorsport for 2023, scoring a lone third-place finish at the Sachsenring to end the year 13th in points. In parallel, Wood also raced in the Hagerty Radical SR1 Cup, finishing runner-up in points to Theo Micouris. Wood then sat out most of 2024, only returning to racing late in the year by making his GT3 debut in the Brands Hatch enduro of the British GT Championship for Beechdean AMR.

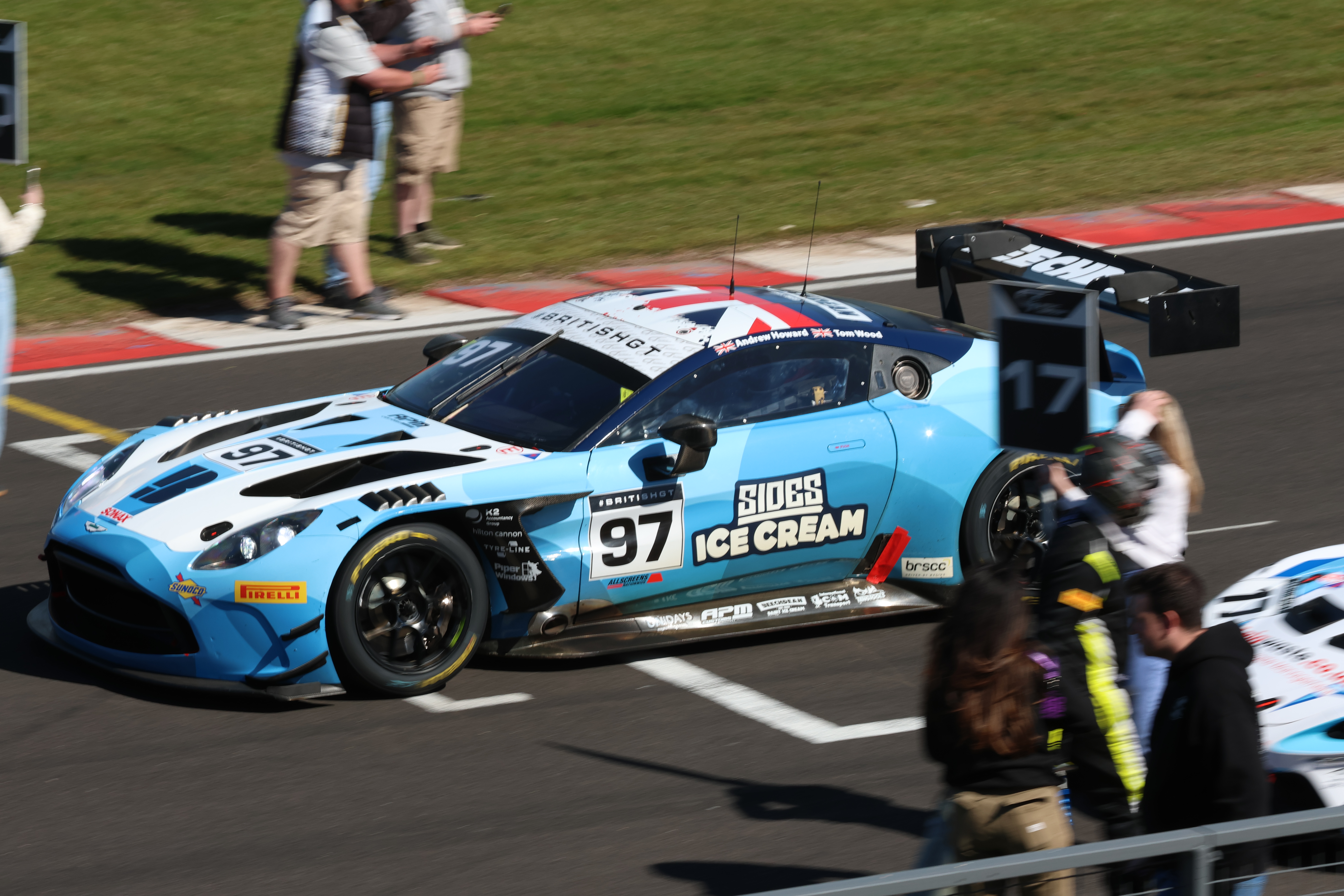
Wood driving his No. 97 Beechdean Aston Martin at British GT's Donington opener in 2025.

Joining Beechdean full-time in British GT in 2025, Wood and team boss Andrew Howard secured four Silver-Am wins and finished on the podium in the other four races to seal the class title at season's end. Wood notably topped the overall timesheets in qualifying at Brands Hatch. The following year, Wood remained in Aston Martin machinery as he joined Racing Spirit of Léman to race in the GT3 class of the Le Mans Cup, but was replaced prior to the season. During 2026, Wood also made a one-off appearance in the GT World Challenge Europe Endurance Cup for Ecurie Ecosse Blackthorn, as well as briefly returning to British GT for McLaren-fielding Orange Racing powered by JMH.

== Karting record ==
=== Karting career summary ===
Season	Series	Team	Position
2011	Trent Valley Kart Club – Comer Cadet		41st
2012	Trent Valley Kart Club – Comer Cadet		1st
2012	MSA British Championship – Cadet		9th
2012	Kartmasters British GP – Comer Cadet		3rd
2013	LGM Series – IAME Cadet		4th
2013	Super One Series – IAME Cadet	Fusion Junior	3rd
2013	Super One Series – Comer Cadet		3rd
2013	Kartmasters British GP – IAME Cadet		2nd
2014	LGM Series – IAME Cadet		1st
2014	Super One Series – IAME Cadet	AIM Motorsport	4th
2014	Kartmasters British GP – IAME Cadet		14th
2015	Formula Kart Stars – Junior		1st
2015	Super One Series – Mini Max	RL Racing Department	7th
2015	Kartmasters British GP – X30 Junior		1st
2015	IAME International Final – X30 Junior		8th

== Racing record ==
=== Racing career summary ===
Season	Series	Team	Races	Wins	Poles	F/Laps	Podiums	Points	Position
2016	Ginetta Junior Championship	Elite Motorsport	25	0	1	0	2	245	11th
2017	Ginetta Junior Championship	HHC Motorsport	26	1	1	5	9	514	5th
2018	British GT Championship – GT4 Silver	Academy Motorsports	9	0	0	0	0	70	9th
2019	GT4 European Series – Pro-Am	Academy Motorsport	8	0	0	2	2	47	10th
2019	GT4 European Series – Silver	Academy Motorsport	4	0	0	0	0	4	23rd
2020	Nürburgring Langstrecken-Serie – Cup 5	Walkenhorst Motorsport	5	0	0	0	0	22.43	15th
2021	Nürburgring Langstrecken-Serie – Cup 5	Purple Dot Racing with Walkenhorst	1	0	0	0	0	0	NC
2022	ADAC GT4 Germany	Racing One	12	0	1	0	3	86	8th
2023	ADAC GT4 Germany	FK Performance Motorsport	12	0	0	0	1	66	13th
2023	Hagerty Radical SR1 Cup	University of Derby	17	6	3	2	9	688	**2nd**
2023	BRSCC Mazda MX-5 Clubman Championship		4	0	0	0	0	0	NC†
2024	British GT Championship – GT3 Silver-Am	Beechdean AMR	1	0	0	0	0	0	NC†
2025	British GT Championship – GT3 Silver-Am	Beechdean Motorsport	9	5	0	0	9	259.5	**1st**
2026	GT World Challenge Europe Endurance Cup	Ecurie Ecosse Blackthorn	1	0	0	0	0	0	NC
2026	GT World Challenge Europe Endurance Cup – Bronze	Ecurie Ecosse Blackthorn	1	0	0	0	0	1	40th
2026	British GT Championship – GT3 Silver-Am	Orange Racing by JMH	1	0	0	0	1	22.5	9th

^{†} As Wood was a guest driver, he was ineligible to score points.

=== Complete Ginetta Junior Championship results ===
(key) (Races in bold indicate pole position) (Races in italics indicate fastest lap)

Year	Team	1	2	3	4	5	6	7	8	9	10	11	12	13	14	15	16	17	18	19	20	21	22	23	24	25	26	Pos	Points
2016	Elite Motorsport	BHI; 1; 15	BHI; 2; 11	DON; 1; 14	DON; 2; 16	DON; 3; 15	THR; 1; 10	THR; 2; 13	OUL; 1; 8	OUL; 2; 9	CRO; 1; 11	CRO; 2; 13	CRO; 3; 10	SNE; 1 Ret	SNE; 2; 15	KNO; 1; 13	KNO; 2; 3	KNO; 3; 15	ROC; 1; 12	ROC; 2; 6	**ROC**; **3**; 2	SIL; 1; 19	SIL; 2; 10	SIL; 3; 7	BHGP; 1; 10	BHGP; 2; 5		11th	251
2017	HHC Motorsport	BHI; 1; 3	BHI; 2; 8	DON; 1; 5	DON; 2; 2	DON; 3; 3	THR; 1 Ret	THR; 2; 6	OUL; 1; 2	OUL; 2; 2	CRO; 1; 3	CRO; 2; 5	CRO; 3; 4	SNE; 1; 3	SNE; 2; 9	SNE; 3; 1	KNO; 1; 6	KNO; 2; 5	ROC; 1; 4	ROC; 2; 4	ROC; 3; 9	**SIL**; **1**; 11	SIL; 2; 4	SIL; 3 Ret	BHGP; 1; 6	BHGP; 2; 4	BHGP; 3; 3	5th	514

=== Complete British GT Championship results ===
(key) (Races in bold indicate pole position) (Races in italics indicate fastest lap)

Year	Team	Car	Class	1	2	3	4	5	6	7	8	9	DC	Points
2018	Academy Motorsports	Aston Martin Vantage AMR GT4	GT4 Silver	OUL; 1; 23	OUL; 2; 31	ROC; 18	SNE; 1; 26	SNE; 2; 24	SIL; 25	SPA; 19	BRH; 22	DON; 25	9th	70
2024	Beechdean Motorsport	Aston Martin Vantage AMR GT3 Evo	GT3 Silver-Am	OUL; 1	OUL; 2	SIL	DON1	SPA	SNE; 1	SNE; 2	DON2	BRH; 6	NC†	0†
2025	Beechdean Motorsport	Aston Martin Vantage AMR GT3 Evo	GT3 Silver-Am	DON1; 8	SIL; 11	OUL; 1; 18	OUL; 2; 8	SPA; 5	SNE; 1; 13	SNE; 2; 12	BRH; 5	DON2; 6	1st	259.5
2026	Orange Racing powered by JMH	McLaren 720S GT3 Evo	GT3	SIL	OUL; 1	OUL; 2	SPA; 7	SNE; 1	SNE; 2	DON	BRH		19th	9

=== Complete GT4 European Series results ===
(key) (Races in bold indicate pole position) (Races in italics indicate fastest lap)

Year	Team	Car	Class	1	2	3	4	5	6	7	8	9	10	11	12	Pos	Points
2019	Academy Motorsport	Aston Martin Vantage AMR GT4	Pro-Am	MNZ; 1; 25	MNZ; 2; 21	BRH; 1; 11	BRH; 2; 14	LEC; 1; 29	LEC; 2; 16			ZAN; 1 Ret	ZAN; 2 Ret			10th	47
2019	Academy Motorsport	Aston Martin Vantage AMR GT4	Silver							MIS; 1 Ret	MIS; 2; 7			NÜR; 1 Ret	NÜR; 2; 23	23rd	8

=== Complete ADAC GT4 Germany results ===
(key) (Races in bold indicate pole position) (Races in italics indicate fastest lap)

Year	Team	Car	1	2	3	4	5	6	7	8	9	10	11	12	DC	Points
2022	Racing One	Aston Martin Vantage AMR GT4	OSC; 1; 11	**OSC**; **2**; 2	RBR; 1 Ret	RBR; 2; 3	ZAN; 1; 23	ZAN; 2; 8	NÜR; 1; 17	NÜR; 2; 13	SAC; 1; 12	SAC; 2; 9	HOC; 1; 10	HOC; 2; 3	8th	86
2023	FK Performance Motorsport	BMW M4 GT4	OSC; 1; 7	OSC; 2; 8	ZAN; 1; 9	ZAN; 2; 8	NÜR; 1; 13	NÜR; 2; 22	LAU; 1; 15	LAU; 2; 8	SAC; 1; 9	SAC; 2; 3	HOC; 1; 25	HOC; 2; 18	13th	66

=== Complete GT World Challenge Europe results ===
==== GT World Challenge Europe Endurance Cup ====
(Races in bold indicate pole position) (Races in italics indicate fastest lap)

Year	Team	Car	Class	1	2	3	4	5	6	7	Pos.	Points
2026	Ecurie Ecosse Blackthorn	Aston Martin Vantage AMR GT3 Evo	Bronze	LEC; 41	MNZ	SPA; 6H	SPA; 12H	SPA; 24H	NÜR	ALG	40th	1
