= 2025 British GT Championship =

Sports car racing season

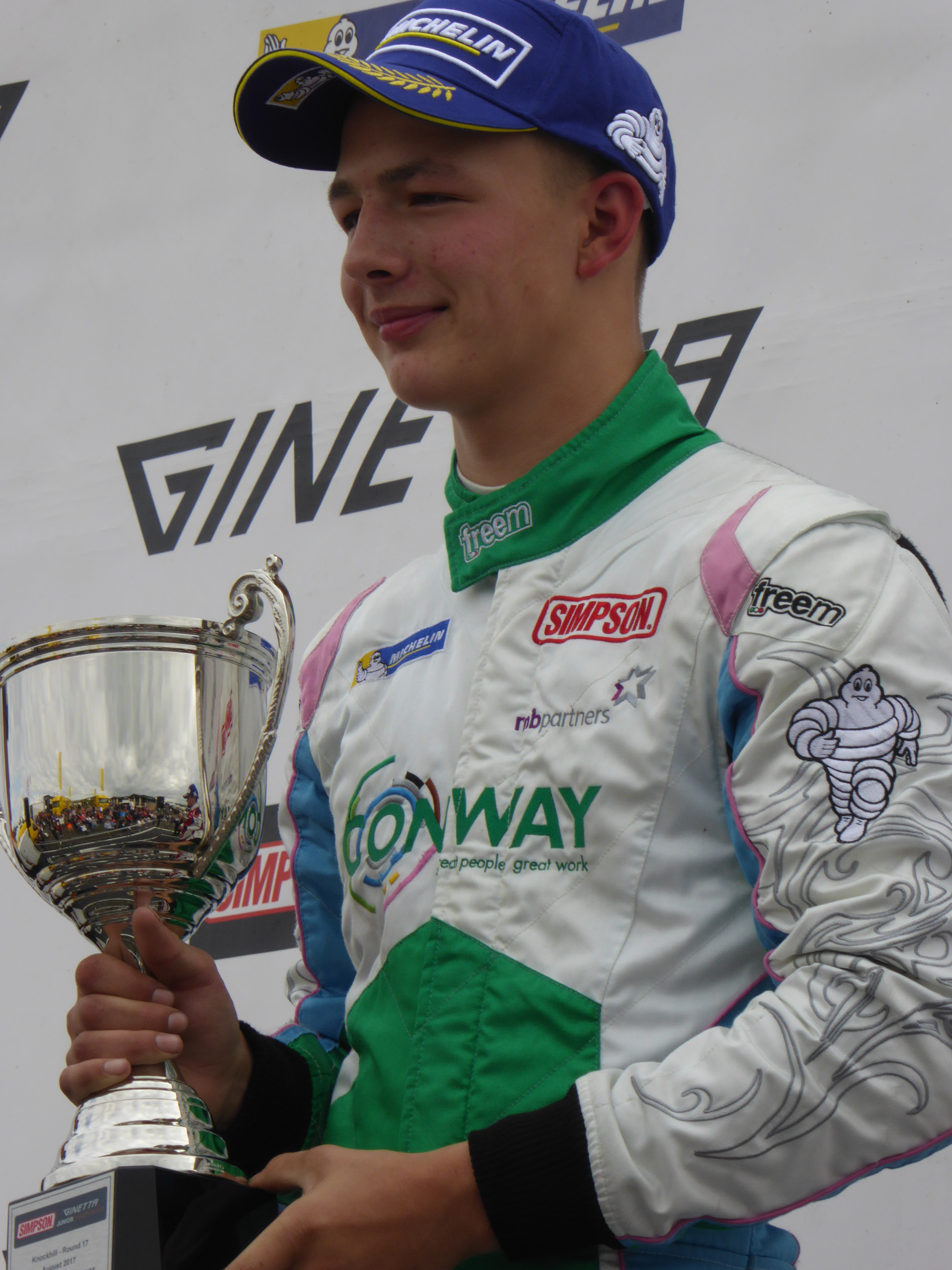
Kiern Jewiss (pictured) and Charles Dawson are leading the Drivers' Championship

The 2025 British GT Championship was the 33rd British GT Championship, a sports car championship promoted by the SRO Motorsports Group. The season began on 6 April and finished on 5 October at Donington Park.

== Calendar ==
The calendar was provisionally unveiled on 28 June 2024. In a change from the 2024 schedule, the season started and ended with a 2-hour round at Donington Park with Oulton Park moving to the third round, at the request of the teams because of weather issues, however, the race will stay on a Bank Holiday but moving from Easter Monday to the Spring bank holiday at the end of May, and Donington Park moving to the penultimate round. The international round stayed at Spa as part of the SRO's Speedweek. Another change from prior seasons was the moving of the media day from Donington Park to Silverstone.

The series introduced a four round endurance cup, limited to GT4 entries. The endurance cup consisted of the opening and closing rounds at Donington Park, as well as the rounds at Silverstone and Spa-Francorchamps.

Race is part of the Endurance Cup

Round	Circuit	Length	Date
1	(United Kingdom) Donington Park, Leicestershire	120 min	5–6 April
2	(United Kingdom) Silverstone Circuit, Northamptonshire	180 min	26–27 April
3	(United Kingdom) Oulton Park, Cheshire	60 min	24–26 May
4	(United Kingdom) Oulton Park, Cheshire	60 min	24–26 May
5	Circuit de Spa-Francorchamps, Stavelot, Belgium	180 min	21–22 June
6	(United Kingdom) Snetterton Circuit, Norfolk	60 min	11–13 July
7	(United Kingdom) Snetterton Circuit, Norfolk	60 min	11–13 July
8	(United Kingdom) Brands Hatch, Kent	120 min	23–24 August
9	(United Kingdom) Donington Park, Leicestershire	120 min	4–5 October

== Entry list ==
Team	Car	Engine	No.	Drivers	Class	Rounds
GT3
(United Kingdom) Barwell Motorsport	Lamborghini Huracán GT3 Evo 2	Lamborghini DGF 5.2 L V10	1	(United Kingdom) Hugo Cook	PA	All
(United Kingdom) Barwell Motorsport	Lamborghini Huracán GT3 Evo 2	Lamborghini DGF 5.2 L V10	1	(United Kingdom) Matt Topham	PA	1
(United Kingdom) Barwell Motorsport	Lamborghini Huracán GT3 Evo 2	Lamborghini DGF 5.2 L V10	1	(United Kingdom) Rob Collard	PA	2–9
(United Kingdom) Barwell Motorsport	Lamborghini Huracán GT3 Evo 2	Lamborghini DGF 5.2 L V10	78	(United Kingdom) Alex Martin	PA	All
(United Kingdom) Barwell Motorsport	Lamborghini Huracán GT3 Evo 2	Lamborghini DGF 5.2 L V10	78	(United Kingdom) Sandy Mitchell	PA	1, 3–4, 6–7, 9
(United Kingdom) Barwell Motorsport	Lamborghini Huracán GT3 Evo 2	Lamborghini DGF 5.2 L V10	78	(Finland) Patrick Kujala	PA	2, 5, 8
(United Kingdom) Optimum Motorsport	McLaren 720S GT3 Evo	McLaren M840T 4.0 L Turbo V8	3	(United Kingdom) Callum MacLeod	PA	All
(United Kingdom) Optimum Motorsport	McLaren 720S GT3 Evo	McLaren M840T 4.0 L Turbo V8	3	(United Kingdom) Mike Price	PA	1–4, 9
(United Kingdom) Optimum Motorsport	McLaren 720S GT3 Evo	McLaren M840T 4.0 L Turbo V8	3	(United Kingdom) Matt Topham	PA	5
(United Kingdom) Optimum Motorsport	McLaren 720S GT3 Evo	McLaren M840T 4.0 L Turbo V8	3	(United Kingdom) Carl Cavers	PA	6–7
(United Kingdom) Optimum Motorsport	McLaren 720S GT3 Evo	McLaren M840T 4.0 L Turbo V8	3	(Republic of Ireland) Jon Kearney	PA	8
(United Kingdom) Optimum Motorsport	McLaren 720S GT3 Evo	McLaren M840T 4.0 L Turbo V8	77	(Germany) Marvin Kirchhöfer	PA	All
(United Kingdom) Optimum Motorsport	McLaren 720S GT3 Evo	McLaren M840T 4.0 L Turbo V8	77	(United Kingdom) Morgan Tillbrook	PA	All
(United Kingdom) Blackthorn	Aston Martin Vantage AMR GT3 Evo	Aston Martin M177 4.0 L Twin-Turbo V8	7	(United Kingdom) Jonathan Adam	PA	All
(United Kingdom) Blackthorn	Aston Martin Vantage AMR GT3 Evo	Aston Martin M177 4.0 L Twin-Turbo V8	7	(Italy) Giacomo Petrobelli	PA	All
(United Kingdom) Blackthorn	Aston Martin Vantage AMR GT3 Evo	Aston Martin M177 4.0 L Twin-Turbo V8	19	(United Kingdom) Charles Bateman	SA	2
(United Kingdom) Blackthorn	Aston Martin Vantage AMR GT3 Evo	Aston Martin M177 4.0 L Twin-Turbo V8	19	(Switzerland) Claude Bovet	SA	2
(United Kingdom) Blackthorn	Aston Martin Vantage AMR GT3 Evo	Aston Martin M177 4.0 L Twin-Turbo V8	22	(United Kingdom) Darren Leung	PA	9
(United Kingdom) Blackthorn	Aston Martin Vantage AMR GT3 Evo	Aston Martin M177 4.0 L Twin-Turbo V8	22	(United Kingdom) Nick Yelloly	PA	9
(United Kingdom) Team Abba Racing	Mercedes-AMG GT3 Evo	Mercedes-AMG M159 6.2 L V8	8	(United Kingdom) Richard Neary	PA	1–5, 8–9
(United Kingdom) Team Abba Racing	Mercedes-AMG GT3 Evo	Mercedes-AMG M159 6.2 L V8	8	(United Kingdom) Sam Neary	PA	1–5, 8–9
(United Kingdom) Paddock Motorsport	McLaren 720S GT3 Evo	McLaren M840T 4.0 L Turbo V8	9	(United Kingdom) Martin Plowman	PA	All
(United Kingdom) Paddock Motorsport	McLaren 720S GT3 Evo	McLaren M840T 4.0 L Turbo V8	9	(United States) Mark Smith	PA	All
(Bahrain) 2 Seas Motorsport	Mercedes-AMG GT3 Evo	Mercedes-AMG M159 6.2 L V8	18	(Germany) Maximilian Götz	PA	All
(Bahrain) 2 Seas Motorsport	Mercedes-AMG GT3 Evo	Mercedes-AMG M159 6.2 L V8	18	(Hong Kong) Kevin Tse	PA	All
(Bahrain) 2 Seas Motorsport	Mercedes-AMG GT3 Evo	Mercedes-AMG M159 6.2 L V8	42	(United Kingdom) Charles Dawson	PA	All
(Bahrain) 2 Seas Motorsport	Mercedes-AMG GT3 Evo	Mercedes-AMG M159 6.2 L V8	42	(United Kingdom) Kiern Jewiss	PA	All
(United Kingdom) Greystone GT	McLaren 720S GT3 Evo	McLaren M840T 4.0 L Turbo V8	24	(Estonia) Andrey Borodin	PA	1–2
(United Kingdom) Greystone GT	McLaren 720S GT3 Evo	McLaren M840T 4.0 L Turbo V8	24	(United Kingdom) Oliver Webb	PA	1–2
(United Kingdom) Century Motorsport	BMW M4 GT3 Evo	BMW S58B30T0 3.0 L Twin Turbo I6	25	(Republic of Ireland) Jon Kearney	SA	2
(United Kingdom) Century Motorsport	BMW M4 GT3 Evo	BMW S58B30T0 3.0 L Twin Turbo I6	25	(United Kingdom) Will Moore	SA	2
(United Kingdom) Steller Motorsport	Audi R8 LMS Evo II	Audi DAR 5.2 L V10	27	(United Kingdom) Darren Burke	SA	2
(United Kingdom) Steller Motorsport	Audi R8 LMS Evo II	Audi DAR 5.2 L V10	27	(United Kingdom) Matt Topham	SA	2
(Switzerland) Spirit of Race	Ferrari 296 GT3	Ferrari F163 3.0 L Turbo V6	28	(Italy) Francesco Castellacci	SA	2
(Switzerland) Spirit of Race	Ferrari 296 GT3	Ferrari F163 3.0 L Turbo V6	28	(United Kingdom) Marcos Vivian	SA	2
(Switzerland) Spirit of Race	Ferrari 296 GT3	Ferrari F163 3.0 L Turbo V6	55	(United Kingdom) Duncan Cameron	PA	2–7, 9
(Switzerland) Spirit of Race	Ferrari 296 GT3	Ferrari F163 3.0 L Turbo V6	55	(Republic of Ireland) Matt Griffin	PA	2–7, 9
(United Kingdom) Team Parker Racing	Porsche 911 GT3 R (992)	Porsche M97/80 4.2 L Flat-6	66	(United Kingdom) Nick Jones	PA	1–4, 6–9
(United Kingdom) Team Parker Racing	Porsche 911 GT3 R (992)	Porsche M97/80 4.2 L Flat-6	66	(Germany) Sven Müller	PA	1–4, 6–9
(United Kingdom) Orange Racing powered by JMH	McLaren 720S GT3 Evo	McLaren M840T 4.0 L Turbo V8	67	(United Kingdom) Marcus Clutton	PA	All
(United Kingdom) Orange Racing powered by JMH	McLaren 720S GT3 Evo	McLaren M840T 4.0 L Turbo V8	67	(United Kingdom) Simon Orange	PA	1–8
(United Kingdom) Orange Racing powered by JMH	McLaren 720S GT3 Evo	McLaren M840T 4.0 L Turbo V8	67	(United Kingdom) Matt Topham	PA	9
(United Kingdom) Mahiki Racing	McLaren 720S GT3 Evo	McLaren M840T 4.0 L Turbo V8	68	(United Kingdom) Steven Lake	SA	9
(United Kingdom) Mahiki Racing	McLaren 720S GT3 Evo	McLaren M840T 4.0 L Turbo V8	68	(United Kingdom) Josh Miller	SA	9
(Switzerland) Kessel Racing	Ferrari 296 GT3	Ferrari F163 3.0 L Turbo V6	74	(United Kingdom) Andrew Gilbert	SA	2
(Switzerland) Kessel Racing	Ferrari 296 GT3	Ferrari F163 3.0 L Turbo V6	74	(Spain) Fran Rueda	SA	2
(United Kingdom) Bridger Motorsport	Honda NSX GT3 Evo22	Honda JNC1 3.5 L Twin Turbo V6	86	(Hong Kong) Chun Cheong Ip	SA	All
(United Kingdom) Bridger Motorsport	Honda NSX GT3 Evo22	Honda JNC1 3.5 L Twin Turbo V6	86	(United Kingdom) Luke Garlick	SA	1–4
(United Kingdom) Bridger Motorsport	Honda NSX GT3 Evo22	Honda JNC1 3.5 L Twin Turbo V6	86	(United Kingdom) Jay Bridger	SA	5–9
(United Kingdom) Paradine Competition	BMW M4 GT3 Evo	BMW S58B30T0 3.0 L Twin Turbo I6	91	(United Kingdom) Dan Harper	PA	2
(United Kingdom) Paradine Competition	BMW M4 GT3 Evo	BMW S58B30T0 3.0 L Twin Turbo I6	91	(United Kingdom) Darren Leung	PA	2
(United Kingdom) Beechdean Motorsport	Aston Martin Vantage AMR GT3 Evo	Aston Martin M177 4.0 L Twin-Turbo V8	97	(United Kingdom) Andrew Howard	SA	All
(United Kingdom) Beechdean Motorsport	Aston Martin Vantage AMR GT3 Evo	Aston Martin M177 4.0 L Twin-Turbo V8	97	(United Kingdom) Tom Wood	SA	All
GT4
(United Kingdom) Team Parker Racing	Mercedes-AMG GT4	Mercedes-AMG M178 4.0 L V8	12	(United Kingdom) Ed McDermott	PA	1–2, 5, 9
(United Kingdom) Team Parker Racing	Mercedes-AMG GT4	Mercedes-AMG M178 4.0 L V8	12	(United Kingdom) Seb Morris	PA	1–2, 5, 9
(United Kingdom) Team Parker Racing	Mercedes-AMG GT4	Mercedes-AMG M178 4.0 L V8	30	(United Kingdom) Jon Currie	PA	All
(United Kingdom) Team Parker Racing	Mercedes-AMG GT4	Mercedes-AMG M178 4.0 L V8	30	(United Kingdom) Phil Keen	PA	All
(United Kingdom) Century Motorsport	BMW M4 GT4 Evo (G82)	BMW S58B30T0 3.0 L Twin-Turbo I6	14	(United Kingdom) Chris Salkeld	S	All
(United Kingdom) Century Motorsport	BMW M4 GT4 Evo (G82)	BMW S58B30T0 3.0 L Twin-Turbo I6	14	(United Kingdom) Branden Templeton	S	All
(United Kingdom) Century Motorsport	BMW M4 GT4 Evo (G82)	BMW S58B30T0 3.0 L Twin-Turbo I6	71	(India) Ravi Ramyead	PA	All
(United Kingdom) Century Motorsport	BMW M4 GT4 Evo (G82)	BMW S58B30T0 3.0 L Twin-Turbo I6	71	(United Kingdom) Charlie Robertson	PA	All
(United Kingdom) Optimum Motorsport	McLaren Artura GT4	McLaren M630 3.0 L Turbo V6	17	(United Kingdom) Harry George	S	All
(United Kingdom) Optimum Motorsport	McLaren Artura GT4	McLaren M630 3.0 L Turbo V6	17	(United Kingdom) Luca Hopkinson	S	All
(United Kingdom) Optimum Motorsport	McLaren Artura GT4	McLaren M630 3.0 L Turbo V6	90	(United Kingdom) Jack Brown	PA	All
(United Kingdom) Optimum Motorsport	McLaren Artura GT4	McLaren M630 3.0 L Turbo V6	90	(United Kingdom) Marc Warren	PA	All
(United Kingdom) MKH Racing	Aston Martin Vantage AMR GT4 Evo	Aston Martin M177 4.0 L Twin-Turbo V8	31	(United Kingdom) Owen Hizzey	PA	9
(United Kingdom) MKH Racing	Aston Martin Vantage AMR GT4 Evo	Aston Martin M177 4.0 L Twin-Turbo V8	31	(United Kingdom) Michael Orant	PA	9
(United Kingdom) MKH Racing	Aston Martin Vantage AMR GT4 Evo	Aston Martin M177 4.0 L Twin-Turbo V8	50	(United Kingdom) Stuart Hall	PA	1–2
(United Kingdom) MKH Racing	Aston Martin Vantage AMR GT4 Evo	Aston Martin M177 4.0 L Twin-Turbo V8	50	(United Kingdom) Peter Montague	PA	1–2
(United Kingdom) Jolt Racing	McLaren Artura GT4	McLaren M630 3.0 L Turbo V6	37	(United Kingdom) John Ingram	PA	1–2, 6–7, 9
(United Kingdom) Jolt Racing	McLaren Artura GT4	McLaren M630 3.0 L Turbo V6	37	(United Kingdom) Rupert Williams	PA	1–2, 6–7, 9
(United Kingdom) Rob Boston Racing	Porsche 718 Cayman GT4 RS Clubsport	Porsche MDG 4.0 L Flat-6	41	(United Kingdom) Will Burns	S	1–2, 5
(United Kingdom) Rob Boston Racing	Porsche 718 Cayman GT4 RS Clubsport	Porsche MDG 4.0 L Flat-6	41	(United Kingdom) Jamie Orton	S	1–2, 5
(United Kingdom) Mahiki Racing	Lotus Emira GT4 1–4; Ginetta G56 GT4 Evo 5–9	Lotus 2GR-FE 3.6 L V6; GM LS3 6.2 L V8	69	(United Kingdom) Steven Lake	PA	1–7
(United Kingdom) Mahiki Racing	Lotus Emira GT4 1–4; Ginetta G56 GT4 Evo 5–9	Lotus 2GR-FE 3.6 L V6; GM LS3 6.2 L V8	69	(United Kingdom) Jack Mitchell	PA	1–4
(United Kingdom) Mahiki Racing	Lotus Emira GT4 1–4; Ginetta G56 GT4 Evo 5–9	Lotus 2GR-FE 3.6 L V6; GM LS3 6.2 L V8	69	(United Kingdom) Blake Angliss	PA	5–7
(United Kingdom) Mahiki Racing	Lotus Emira GT4 1–4; Ginetta G56 GT4 Evo 5–9	Lotus 2GR-FE 3.6 L V6; GM LS3 6.2 L V8	69	(United Kingdom) Blake Angliss	S	9
(United Kingdom) Mahiki Racing	Lotus Emira GT4 1–4; Ginetta G56 GT4 Evo 5–9	Lotus 2GR-FE 3.6 L V6; GM LS3 6.2 L V8	69	(United Kingdom) Luke Garlick	S	9
(United Kingdom) Mahiki Racing	Lotus Emira GT4 1–4; Ginetta G56 GT4 Evo 5–9	Lotus 2GR-FE 3.6 L V6; GM LS3 6.2 L V8	84	(United Kingdom) Josh Miller	S	1–8
(United Kingdom) Mahiki Racing	Lotus Emira GT4 1–4; Ginetta G56 GT4 Evo 5–9	Lotus 2GR-FE 3.6 L V6; GM LS3 6.2 L V8	84	(United Kingdom) Aiden Neate	S	1–4
(United Kingdom) Mahiki Racing	Lotus Emira GT4 1–4; Ginetta G56 GT4 Evo 5–9	Lotus 2GR-FE 3.6 L V6; GM LS3 6.2 L V8	84	(United Kingdom) Jack Mitchell	S	5–8
(United Kingdom) Mahiki Racing	Lotus Emira GT4 1–4; Ginetta G56 GT4 Evo 5–9	Lotus 2GR-FE 3.6 L V6; GM LS3 6.2 L V8	88	(United Kingdom) Joe Wheeler	PA	All
(United Kingdom) Mahiki Racing	Lotus Emira GT4 1–4; Ginetta G56 GT4 Evo 5–9	Lotus 2GR-FE 3.6 L V6; GM LS3 6.2 L V8	88	(United Kingdom) Ian Duggan	PA	1–8
(United Kingdom) Mahiki Racing	Lotus Emira GT4 1–4; Ginetta G56 GT4 Evo 5–9	Lotus 2GR-FE 3.6 L V6; GM LS3 6.2 L V8	88	(United Kingdom) James Townsend	PA	9

Icon	Class
S	Silver Cup
PA	Pro-Am Cup
SA	Silver-Am Cup

- Team Parker Racing was scheduled to compete the full season, but missed the endurance round at Spa-Francorchamps. Harry King was scheduled to compete for the team at Spa, substituting for Sven Müller, and did not compete at any other rounds in the championship.

== Race results ==
Bold indicates overall winner for each car class (GT3 and GT4).

=== GT3 ===
Event	Circuit	Pole position	Pro-Am Winners	Silver-Am Winners
1	Donington Park	(Bahrain) No. 42 2 Seas Motorsport	**(Bahrain) No. 42 2 Seas Motorsport**	(United Kingdom) No. 97 Beechdean Motorsport
1	Donington Park	(United Kingdom) Charles Dawson (United Kingdom) Kiern Jewiss	**(United Kingdom) Charles Dawson** **(United Kingdom) Kiern Jewiss**	(United Kingdom) Andrew Howard (United Kingdom) Tom Wood
2	Silverstone	(United Kingdom) No. 77 Optimum Motorsport	**(United Kingdom) No. 91 Paradine Competition**	(United Kingdom) No. 27 Steller Motorsport
2	Silverstone	(Germany) Marvin Kirchhöfer (United Kingdom) Morgan Tillbrook	**(United Kingdom) Dan Harper** **(United Kingdom) Darren Leung**	(United Kingdom) Darren Burke (United Kingdom) Matt Topham
3	Oulton Park	(United Kingdom) No. 1 Barwell Motorsport	**(United Kingdom) No. 1 Barwell Motorsport**	(United Kingdom) No. 86 Bridger Motorsport
3	Oulton Park	(United Kingdom) Hugo Cook (United Kingdom) Rob Collard	**(United Kingdom) Hugo Cook** **(United Kingdom) Rob Collard**	(United Kingdom) Luke Garlick (Hong Kong) Chun Cheong Ip
4	Oulton Park	(Bahrain) No. 18 2 Seas Motorsport	**(Bahrain) No. 18 2 Seas Motorsport**	(United Kingdom) No. 86 Bridger Motorsport
4	Oulton Park	(Germany) Maximilian Götz (Hong Kong) Kevin Tse	**(Germany) Maximilian Götz** **(Hong Kong) Kevin Tse**	(United Kingdom) Luke Garlick (Hong Kong) Chun Cheong Ip
5	Spa-Francorchamps	(United Kingdom) No. 7 Blackthorn	**(United Kingdom) No. 7 Blackthorn**	(United Kingdom) No. 97 Beechdean Motorsport
5	Spa-Francorchamps	(United Kingdom) Jonathan Adam (Italy) Giacomo Petrobelli	**(United Kingdom) Jonathan Adam** **(Italy) Giacomo Petrobelli**	(United Kingdom) Andrew Howard (United Kingdom) Tom Wood
6	Snetterton	(Bahrain) No. 42 2 Seas Motorsport	**(Bahrain) No. 42 2 Seas Motorsport**	(United Kingdom) No. 86 Bridger Motorsport
6	Snetterton	(United Kingdom) Charles Dawson (United Kingdom) Kiern Jewiss	**(United Kingdom) Charles Dawson** **(United Kingdom) Kiern Jewiss**	(United Kingdom) Jay Bridger (Hong Kong) Chun Cheong Ip
7	Snetterton	(Bahrain) No. 18 2 Seas Motorsport	**(Bahrain) No. 18 2 Seas Motorsport**	(United Kingdom) No. 86 Bridger Motorsport
7	Snetterton	(Germany) Maximilian Götz (Hong Kong) Kevin Tse	**(Germany) Maximilian Götz** **(Hong Kong) Kevin Tse**	(United Kingdom) Jay Bridger (Hong Kong) Chun Cheong Ip
8	Brands Hatch	(Bahrain) No. 18 2 Seas Motorsport	**(Bahrain) No. 42 2 Seas Motorsport**	(United Kingdom) No. 97 Beechdean Motorsport
8	Brands Hatch	(Germany) Maximilian Götz (Hong Kong) Kevin Tse	**(United Kingdom) Charles Dawson** **(United Kingdom) Kiern Jewiss**	(United Kingdom) Andrew Howard (United Kingdom) Tom Wood
9	Donington Park	(United Kingdom) No. 1 Barwell Motorsport	**(United Kingdom) No. 78 Barwell Motorsport**	(United Kingdom) No. 97 Beechdean Motorsport
9	Donington Park	(United Kingdom) Hugo Cook (United Kingdom) Rob Collard	**(United Kingdom) Alex Martin** **(United Kingdom) Sandy Mitchell**	(United Kingdom) Andrew Howard (United Kingdom) Tom Wood

=== GT4 ===
Event	Circuit	Pole position	Pro-Am Winners	Silver Winners
1	Donington Park	(United Kingdom) No. 90 Optimum Motorsport	**(United Kingdom) No. 90 Optimum Motorsport**	(United Kingdom) No. 84 Mahiki Racing
1	Donington Park	(United Kingdom) Jack Brown (United Kingdom) Marc Warren	**(United Kingdom) Jack Brown** **(United Kingdom) Marc Warren**	(United Kingdom) Josh Miller (United Kingdom) Aiden Neate
2	Silverstone	(United Kingdom) No. 84 Mahiki Racing	**(United Kingdom) No. 71 Century Motorsport**	(United Kingdom) No. 14 Century Motorsport
2	Silverstone	(United Kingdom) Josh Miller (United Kingdom) Aiden Neate	**(India) Ravi Ramyead** **(United Kingdom) Charlie Robertson**	(United Kingdom) Chris Salkeld (United Kingdom) Branden Templeton
3	Oulton Park	(United Kingdom) No. 84 Mahiki Racing	**(United Kingdom) No. 90 Optimum Motorsport**	(United Kingdom) No. 14 Century Motorsport
3	Oulton Park	(United Kingdom) Josh Miller (United Kingdom) Aiden Neate	**(United Kingdom) Jack Brown** **(United Kingdom) Marc Warren**	(United Kingdom) Chris Salkeld (United Kingdom) Branden Templeton
4	Oulton Park	(United Kingdom) No. 71 Century Motorsport	**(United Kingdom) No. 90 Optimum Motorsport**	(United Kingdom) No. 17 Optimum Motorsport
4	Oulton Park	(India) Ravi Ramyead (United Kingdom) Charlie Robertson	**(United Kingdom) Jack Brown** **(United Kingdom) Marc Warren**	(United Kingdom) Harry George (United Kingdom) Luca Hopkinson
5	Spa-Francorchamps	(United Kingdom) No. 84 Mahiki Racing	**(United Kingdom) No. 71 Century Motorsport**	(United Kingdom) No. 17 Optimum Motorsport
5	Spa-Francorchamps	(United Kingdom) Josh Miller (United Kingdom) Jack Mitchell	**(India) Ravi Ramyead** **(United Kingdom) Charlie Robertson**	(United Kingdom) Harry George (United Kingdom) Luca Hopkinson
6	Snetterton	(United Kingdom) No. 17 Optimum Motorsport	**(United Kingdom) No. 90 Optimum Motorsport**	(United Kingdom) No. 84 Mahiki Racing
6	Snetterton	(United Kingdom) Harry George (United Kingdom) Luca Hopkinson	**(United Kingdom) Jack Brown** **(United Kingdom) Marc Warren**	(United Kingdom) Josh Miller (United Kingdom) Jack Mitchell
7	Snetterton	(United Kingdom) No. 84 Mahiki Racing	**(United Kingdom) No. 71 Century Motorsport**	(United Kingdom) No. 17 Optimum Motorsport
7	Snetterton	(United Kingdom) Josh Miller (United Kingdom) Jack Mitchell	**(India) Ravi Ramyead** **(United Kingdom) Charlie Robertson**	(United Kingdom) Harry George (United Kingdom) Luca Hopkinson
8	Brands Hatch	(United Kingdom) No. 84 Mahiki Racing	(United Kingdom) No. 71 Century Motorsport	**(United Kingdom) No. 17 Optimum Motorsport**
8	Brands Hatch	(United Kingdom) Josh Miller (United Kingdom) Jack Mitchell	(India) Ravi Ramyead (United Kingdom) Charlie Robertson	**(United Kingdom) Harry George** **(United Kingdom) Luca Hopkinson**
9	Donington Park	(United Kingdom) No. 69 Mahiki Racing	**(United Kingdom) No. 90 Optimum Motorsport**	(United Kingdom) No. 69 Mahiki Racing
9	Donington Park	(United Kingdom) Blake Angliss (United Kingdom) Luke Garlick	**(United Kingdom) Jack Brown** **(United Kingdom) Marc Warren**	(United Kingdom) Blake Angliss (United Kingdom) Luke Garlick

== Championship standings ==
=== Scoring system ===
Length	1st	2nd	3rd	4th	5th	6th	7th	8th	9th	10th
1 hour	25	18	15	12	10	8	6	4	2	1
2+ hours	37.5	27	22.5	18	15	12	9	6	3	1.5

=== Drivers' championship ===
==== Overall ====
Pos.	Drivers	Team	DON	SIL	OUL		SPA	SNE		BRH	DON	Points
GT3
1	(United Kingdom) Charles Dawson (United Kingdom) Kiern Jewiss	(Bahrain) 2 Seas Motorsport	**1**	2	9	11	6	**1**	8	1	4	173.5
2	(United Kingdom) Hugo Cook	(United Kingdom) Barwell Motorsport	6	6	**1**	10	3	8	3	3	**2**	144
3	(Germany) Maximilian Götz (Hong Kong) Kevin Tse	(Bahrain) 2 Seas Motorsport	3	13	2	**1**	19	2	**1**	**7**	3	141.5
4	(United Kingdom) Alex Martin	(United Kingdom) Barwell Motorsport	2	7	5	12	4	3	2	10	1	139
5	(United Kingdom) Rob Collard	(United Kingdom) Barwell Motorsport		6	1	10	3	8	3	3	**2**	132
6	(United Kingdom) Jonathan Adam (Italy) Giacomo Petrobelli	(United Kingdom) Blackthorn	12	4	3	4	**1**	4	5	4	11	130
7	(Germany) Marvin Kirchhöfer (United Kingdom) Morgan Tillbrook	(United Kingdom) Optimum Motorsport	4	**3**	8	5	2	9	4	2	Ret	127
8	(United Kingdom) Sandy Mitchell	(United Kingdom) Barwell Motorsport	2		5	12		3	2		1	107.5
9	(United Kingdom) Marcus Clutton	(United Kingdom) Orange Racing powered by JMH	7	5	12	2	18	10	7	6	8	64
=	(United Kingdom) Simon Orange	(United Kingdom) Orange Racing powered by JMH	7	5	12	2	18	10	7	6		64
10	(United Kingdom) Andrew Howard (United Kingdom) Tom Wood	(United Kingdom) Beechdean Motorsport	8	11	18	8	5	13	12	5	6	58
11	(United Kingdom) Martin Plowman (United States) Mark Smith	(United Kingdom) Paddock Motorsport	9	8	11	7	8	5	9	9	10	45
12	(United Kingdom) Richard Neary (United Kingdom) Sam Neary	(United Kingdom) Team Abba Racing	5	10	4	Ret	Ret				9	42
13	(United Kingdom) Duncan Cameron (Republic of Ireland) Matt Griffin	(Switzerland) Spirit of Race		Ret	7	9	7	7	10		7	36
14	(United Kingdom) Nick Jones (Germany) Sven Müller	(United Kingdom) Team Parker Racing	22†	15	6	6		6	6	18†	Ret	32
15	(Finland) Patrick Kujala	(United Kingdom) Barwell Motorsport		7			4			10		31.5
16	(Hong Kong) Chun Cheong Ip	(United Kingdom) Bridger Motorsport	11	14	13	3	9	12	11	11	12	19.5
17	(United Kingdom) Luke Garlick	(United Kingdom) Bridger Motorsport	11	14	13	3						15
18	(United Kingdom) Matt Topham	(United Kingdom) Barwell Motorsport	6									13.5
18	(United Kingdom) Matt Topham	(United Kingdom) Steller Motorsport		9								13.5
18	(United Kingdom) Matt Topham	(United Kingdom) Optimum Motorsport					10					13.5
18	(United Kingdom) Matt Topham	(United Kingdom) Orange Racing powered by JMH									8	13.5
19	(United Kingdom) Callum MacLeod	(United Kingdom) Optimum Motorsport	10	Ret	10	Ret	10	11	Ret	8	13	10
20	(United Kingdom) Jon Kearney	(United Kingdom) Optimum Motorsport								8		6
21	(United Kingdom) Jay Bridger	(United Kingdom) Bridger Motorsport					9	12	11	11	12	4.5
22	(United Kingdom) Mike Price	(United Kingdom) Optimum Motorsport	10	Ret	10	Ret					13	2.5
23	(United Kingdom) Carl Cavers	(United Kingdom) Optimum Motorsport						11	Ret			0
24	(Estonia) Andrey Borodin (United Kingdom) Oliver Webb	(United Kingdom) Greystone GT	13	Ret								0
Drivers ineligible to score points
-	(United Kingdom) Darren Leung	(United Kingdom) Paradine Competition		1								-
-	(United Kingdom) Darren Leung	(United Kingdom) Blackthorn									5	-
-	(United Kingdom) Dan Harper	(United Kingdom) Paradine Competition		1								-
-	(United Kingdom) Nick Yelloly	(United Kingdom) Blackthorn									5	-
-	(United Kingdom) Darren Burke	(United Kingdom) Steller Motorsport		9								-
-	(United Kingdom) Charles Bateman (Switzerland) Claude Bovet	(United Kingdom) Blackthorn		12								-
-	(Italy) Francesco Castellacci (United Kingdom) Marcos Vivian	(Switzerland) Spirit of Race		16								-
-	(Republic of Ireland) Jon Kearney (United Kingdom) Will Moore	(United Kingdom) Century Motorsport		17								-
-	(United Kingdom) Andrew Gilbert (Spain) Fran Rueda	(Switzerland) Kessel Racing		DSQ								-
GT4
1	(India) Ravi Ramyead (United Kingdom) Charlie Robertson	(United Kingdom) Century Motorsport	14	17	Ret	**DNS**	11	17	13	13		166
2	(United Kingdom) Jack Brown (United Kingdom) Marc Warren	(United Kingdom) Optimum Motorsport	**13**	18	14	13	15	14	18	Ret		162.5
3	(United Kingdom) Harry George (United Kingdom) Luca Hopkinson	(United Kingdom) Optimum Motorsport	Ret	21	17	14	14	**16**	16	12		130.5
4	(United Kingdom) Chris Salkeld (United Kingdom) Branden Templeton	(United Kingdom) Century Motorsport	19	20	16	17	DSQ	18	15	17		93.5
5	(United Kingdom) Jon Currie (United Kingdom) Phil Keen	(United Kingdom) Team Parker Racing	16	25	WD	WD	13	20	20	14		79
6	(United Kingdom) Jack Mitchell	(United Kingdom) Mahiki Racing	Ret	Ret	15	15	**17**	15	**17**	**Ret**		70
7	(United Kingdom) Ian Duggan (United Kingdom) Joe Wheeler	(United Kingdom) Mahiki Racing	Ret	24	Ret	16	20	19	14	16		68
8	(United Kingdom) Ed McDermott (United Kingdom) Seb Morris	(United Kingdom) Team Parker Racing	15	23			12					61.5
9	(United Kingdom) Josh Miller	(United Kingdom) Mahiki Racing	17	**Ret**	**Ret**	18	**17**	15	**17**	**Ret**		60
10	(United Kingdom) Steven Lake	(United Kingdom) Mahiki Racing	Ret	Ret	15	15	16	21	19			55
11	(United Kingdom) Blake Angliss	(United Kingdom) Mahiki Racing					16	21	19	15		40
12	(United Kingdom) Will Burns (United Kingdom) Jamie Orton	(United Kingdom) Rob Boston Racing	18	22			WD					27
13	(United Kingdom) Aiden Neate	(United Kingdom) Mahiki Racing	17	**Ret**	**Ret**	18						23
14	(United Kingdom) Luke Garlick	(United Kingdom) Mahiki Racing								15		18
15	(United Kingdom) Stuart Hall (United Kingdom) Peter Montague	(United Kingdom) MKH Racing	20	26								9
16	(United Kingdom) John Ingram (United Kingdom) Rupert Williams	(United Kingdom) Jolt Racing	21	27				22	Ret			6.5
Pos.	Drivers	Team	DON	SIL	OUL		SPA	SNE		BRH	DON	Points

Colour	Result
Gold	Winner
Silver	Second place
Bronze	Third place
Green	Points classification
Blue	Non-points classification
Blue	Non-classified finish (NC)
Purple	Retired, not classified (Ret)
Red	Did not qualify (DNQ)
Red	Did not pre-qualify (DNPQ)
Black	Disqualified (DSQ)
White	Did not start (DNS)
White	Withdrew (WD)
White	Race cancelled (C)
Blank	Did not practice (DNP)
Blank	Did not arrive (DNA)
Blank	Excluded (EX)

**Bold** indicates pole position

Notes

- † – Drivers did not finish the race but were classified, as they completed more than 75% of the race distance.

== See also ==
- 2025 GT World Challenge America
- 2025 GT World Challenge Asia
- 2025 GT World Challenge Australia
- 2025 GT World Challenge Europe Endurance Cup
- 2025 GT World Challenge Europe Sprint Cup
- 2025 Intercontinental GT Challenge
