= 2018 British GT Championship =

Sports car racing season

The 2018 British GT Championship was the 26th British GT Championship, a sports car championship promoted by the Stéphane Ratel Organisation (SRO). The season began on 31 March at Oulton Park and finished on 23 September at Donington Park, after nine rounds held over seven meetings.

== Calendar ==
The calendar for the 2018 season was announced on 29 July 2017. All races except Belgian round at Spa, were held in the United Kingdom.

Round	Circuit	Length	Date
1	(United Kingdom) Oulton Park, Cheshire	60 min	31 March – 2 April
2	(United Kingdom) Oulton Park, Cheshire	60 min	31 March – 2 April
3	(United Kingdom) Rockingham Motor Speedway, Northamptonshire	120 min	28–29 April
4	(United Kingdom) Snetterton Circuit, Norfolk	60 min	26–27 May
5	(United Kingdom) Snetterton Circuit, Norfolk	60 min	26–27 May
6	(United Kingdom) Silverstone Circuit, Northamptonshire	180 min	9–10 June
7	Circuit de Spa-Francorchamps, Spa, Belgium	120 min	21–22 July
8	(United Kingdom) Brands Hatch, Kent	120 min	4–5 August
9	(United Kingdom) Donington Park, Leicestershire	120 min	22–23 September

== Entry list ==
=== GT3 ===
Team	Car	Engine	No.	Drivers	Class		Rounds
Team	Car	Engine	No.	Drivers	Car	Driver	Rounds
(United Kingdom) Team Parker Racing	Bentley Continental GT3	Bentley 4.0 L Turbo V8	1	(United Kingdom) Rick Parfitt Jr.	GT3	PA	All
(United Kingdom) Team Parker Racing	Bentley Continental GT3	Bentley 4.0 L Turbo V8	1	(United Kingdom) Ryan Ratcliffe	GT3	PA	1–5, 7–9
(United Kingdom) Team Parker Racing	Bentley Continental GT3	Bentley 4.0 L Turbo V8	1	(United Kingdom) Seb Morris	GT3	PA	6
(United Kingdom) Team Parker Racing	Bentley Continental GT3	Bentley 4.0 L Turbo V8	7	(United Kingdom) Ian Loggie	GT3	PA	All
(United Kingdom) Team Parker Racing	Bentley Continental GT3	Bentley 4.0 L Turbo V8	7	(United Kingdom) Callum MacLeod	GT3	PA	All
(United Kingdom) Barwell Motorsport	Lamborghini Huracán GT3	Lamborghini 5.2 L V10	2	(Finland) Patrick Kujala	GT3	PA	1–2
(United Kingdom) Barwell Motorsport	Lamborghini Huracán GT3	Lamborghini 5.2 L V10	2	(Russia) Leo Machitski	GT3	PA	1–2
(United Kingdom) Barwell Motorsport	Lamborghini Huracán GT3	Lamborghini 5.2 L V10	33	(United Kingdom) Phil Keen	GT3	PA	All
(United Kingdom) Barwell Motorsport	Lamborghini Huracán GT3	Lamborghini 5.2 L V10	33	(United Kingdom) Jon Minshaw	GT3	PA	All
(United Kingdom) Barwell Motorsport	Lamborghini Huracán GT3	Lamborghini 5.2 L V10	69	(United Kingdom) Jonny Cocker	GT3	PA	All
(United Kingdom) Barwell Motorsport	Lamborghini Huracán GT3	Lamborghini 5.2 L V10	69	(United Kingdom) Sam De Haan	GT3	PA	All
(United Kingdom) Team ABBA Racing	Mercedes-AMG GT3	Mercedes 6.2 L V8	8	(United Kingdom) Richard Neary	GT3	PA	6–7
(United Kingdom) Team ABBA Racing	Mercedes-AMG GT3	Mercedes 6.2 L V8	8	(United Kingdom) Adam Christodoulou	GT3	PA	6–7
(United Kingdom) TF Sport	Aston Martin V12 Vantage GT3	Aston Martin 6.0 L V12	11	(United Kingdom) Mark Farmer	GT3	PA	All
(United Kingdom) TF Sport	Aston Martin V12 Vantage GT3	Aston Martin 6.0 L V12	11	(Denmark) Nicki Thiim	GT3	PA	All
(United Kingdom) TF Sport	Aston Martin V12 Vantage GT3	Aston Martin 6.0 L V12	17	(United Kingdom) Derek Johnston	GT3	PA	All
(United Kingdom) TF Sport	Aston Martin V12 Vantage GT3	Aston Martin 6.0 L V12	17	(Denmark) Marco Sørensen	GT3	PA	All
(United Kingdom) RJN Motorsport	Nissan GT-R Nismo GT3	Nissan VR38DETT 3.8L Turbo V6	24	(United Kingdom) Struan Moore	GT3	S	1–7
(United Kingdom) RJN Motorsport	Nissan GT-R Nismo GT3	Nissan VR38DETT 3.8L Turbo V6	24	(United Kingdom) Devon Modell	GT3	S	1–3
(United Kingdom) RJN Motorsport	Nissan GT-R Nismo GT3	Nissan VR38DETT 3.8L Turbo V6	24	(United Kingdom) Jordan Witt	GT3	S	4–5, 7
(United Kingdom) RJN Motorsport	Nissan GT-R Nismo GT3	Nissan VR38DETT 3.8L Turbo V6	24	(Mexico) Ricardo Sánchez	GT3	S	6
(United Kingdom) RJN Motorsport	Nissan GT-R Nismo GT3	Nissan VR38DETT 3.8L Turbo V6	24	(United Kingdom) Struan Moore	GT3	PA	9
(United Kingdom) RJN Motorsport	Nissan GT-R Nismo GT3	Nissan VR38DETT 3.8L Turbo V6	24	(United Kingdom) Chris Buncombe	GT3	PA	9
(United Kingdom) Ultimate Speed	Aston Martin V12 Vantage GT3	Aston Martin 6.0 L V12	26	(United Kingdom) Michael Brown	GT3	PA	6, 8
(United Kingdom) Ultimate Speed	Aston Martin V12 Vantage GT3	Aston Martin 6.0 L V12	26	(United Kingdom) Matt Manderson	GT3	PA	6, 8
(United Kingdom) Ram Racing	Mercedes-AMG GT3	Mercedes 6.2 L V8	30	(Netherlands) Remon Vos	GT3	PA	7
(United Kingdom) Ram Racing	Mercedes-AMG GT3	Mercedes 6.2 L V8	30	(United Kingdom) Tom Onslow-Cole	GT3	PA	7
(United Kingdom) Jetstream Motorsport	Aston Martin V12 Vantage GT3	Aston Martin 6.0 L V12	47	(United Kingdom) Graham Davidson	GT3	PA	All
(United Kingdom) Jetstream Motorsport	Aston Martin V12 Vantage GT3	Aston Martin 6.0 L V12	47	(Belgium) Maxime Martin	GT3	PA	All
(United Kingdom) JMH Auto	Ferrari 488 Challenge	Ferrari 3.9L Turbo V8	70	(United Kingdom) Marcus Clutton	GTC	PA	9
(United Kingdom) JMH Auto	Ferrari 488 Challenge	Ferrari 3.9L Turbo V8	70	(United Kingdom) John Seale	GTC	PA	9
(United Kingdom) Optimum Motorsport	Aston Martin V12 Vantage GT3	Aston Martin 6.0 L V12	75	(United Kingdom) Jonny Adam	GT3	PA	All
(United Kingdom) Optimum Motorsport	Aston Martin V12 Vantage GT3	Aston Martin 6.0 L V12	75	(United Kingdom) Flick Haigh	GT3	PA	All
(United Kingdom) Beechdean AMR	Aston Martin V12 Vantage GT3	Aston Martin 6.0 L V12	99	(United Kingdom) Andrew Howard	GT3	PA	All
(United Kingdom) Beechdean AMR	Aston Martin V12 Vantage GT3	Aston Martin 6.0 L V12	99	(United Kingdom) Darren Turner	GT3	PA	All
(United Kingdom) Balfe Motorsport	McLaren 650S GT3	McLaren 3.8 L Turbo V8	101	(United Kingdom) Shaun Balfe	GT3	PA	1–3, 6–7
(United Kingdom) Balfe Motorsport	McLaren 650S GT3	McLaren 3.8 L Turbo V8	101	(United Kingdom) Rob Bell	GT3	PA	1–3, 6–7
(United Kingdom) Balfe Motorsport	McLaren 650S GT3	McLaren 3.8 L Turbo V8	101	(United Kingdom) Graham Johnson	GT3	PA	9
(United Kingdom) Balfe Motorsport	McLaren 650S GT3	McLaren 3.8 L Turbo V8	101	(United Kingdom) Mike Robinson	GT3	PA	9
(United Kingdom) ERC Sport	Mercedes-AMG GT3	Mercedes 6.2 L V8	116	(Netherlands) Yelmer Buurman	GT3	PA	All
(United Kingdom) ERC Sport	Mercedes-AMG GT3	Mercedes 6.2 L V8	116	(United Kingdom) Lee Mowle	GT3	PA	All

Icon	Class
Car
GT3	GT3 Cars
GTC	GTC Cars
Drivers
PA	Pro-Am Cup
S	Silver Cup

=== GT4 ===
Team	Car	Engine	No.	Drivers	Class	Rounds
(United Kingdom) Tolman Motorsport	McLaren 570S GT4	McLaren 3.8L Turbo V8	4	(United Kingdom) Charlie Fagg	S	All
(United Kingdom) Tolman Motorsport	McLaren 570S GT4	McLaren 3.8L Turbo V8	4	(United Kingdom) Michael O'Brien	S	All
(United Kingdom) Tolman Motorsport	McLaren 570S GT4	McLaren 3.8L Turbo V8	5	(United Kingdom) Jordan Albert	S	All
(United Kingdom) Tolman Motorsport	McLaren 570S GT4	McLaren 3.8L Turbo V8	5	(United Kingdom) Lewis Proctor	S	All
(United Kingdom) Tolman Motorsport	McLaren 570S GT4	McLaren 3.8L Turbo V8	56	(United Kingdom) Joe Osborne	PA	All
(United Kingdom) Tolman Motorsport	McLaren 570S GT4	McLaren 3.8L Turbo V8	56	(United Kingdom) David Pattison	PA	All
(Netherlands) Equipe Verschuur	McLaren 570S GT4	McLaren 3.8 L Turbo V8	10	(United Kingdom) Finlay Hutchison	S	All
(Netherlands) Equipe Verschuur	McLaren 570S GT4	McLaren 3.8 L Turbo V8	10	(United Kingdom) Daniel McKay	S	All
(United Kingdom) Invictus Games Racing	Jaguar F-Type SVR GT4	Jaguar 5.0 L S/C V8	22	(United Kingdom) Ben Norfolk	PA	1–5
(United Kingdom) Invictus Games Racing	Jaguar F-Type SVR GT4	Jaguar 5.0 L S/C V8	22	(United Kingdom) Basil Rawlinson	PA	6–8
(United Kingdom) Invictus Games Racing	Jaguar F-Type SVR GT4	Jaguar 5.0 L S/C V8	22	(United States) Jason Wolfe	PA	All
(United Kingdom) Invictus Games Racing	Jaguar F-Type SVR GT4	Jaguar 5.0 L S/C V8	22	(United Kingdom) Steve McCulley	PA	9
(United Kingdom) Invictus Games Racing	Jaguar F-Type SVR GT4	Jaguar 5.0 L S/C V8	44	(United Kingdom) Matt George	PA	All
(United Kingdom) Invictus Games Racing	Jaguar F-Type SVR GT4	Jaguar 5.0 L S/C V8	44	(United Kingdom) Steve McCulley	PA	1–5
(United Kingdom) Invictus Games Racing	Jaguar F-Type SVR GT4	Jaguar 5.0 L S/C V8	44	(United Kingdom) Paul Vice	PA	6–9
(United Kingdom) Ciceley Motorsport	Mercedes-AMG GT4	Mercedes-AMG M178 4.0 L V8	25	(United Kingdom) David Fairbrother	PA	9
(United Kingdom) Ciceley Motorsport	Mercedes-AMG GT4	Mercedes-AMG M178 4.0 L V8	25	(United Kingdom) Adam Morgan	PA	9
(United Kingdom) Team HARD Racing	Ginetta G55 GT4	Ford Cyclone 3.7 L V6	34	(United Kingdom) Anna Walewska	PA	1–5
(United Kingdom) Team HARD Racing	Ginetta G55 GT4	Ford Cyclone 3.7 L V6	34	(United Kingdom) Callum Hawkins-Row	PA	1–5
(United Kingdom) Team HARD Racing	Ginetta G55 GT4	Ford Cyclone 3.7 L V6	34	(United Kingdom) Callum Hawkins-Row	S	6
(United Kingdom) Team HARD Racing	Ginetta G55 GT4	Ford Cyclone 3.7 L V6	34	(United Kingdom) Jordan Stilp	S	6
(United Kingdom) Team HARD Racing	Ginetta G55 GT4	Ford Cyclone 3.7 L V6	88	(United Kingdom) Benjamin Wallace	S	1–6, 8–9
(United Kingdom) Team HARD Racing	Ginetta G55 GT4	Ford Cyclone 3.7 L V6	88	(United Kingdom) William Philips	S	1–2
(United Kingdom) Team HARD Racing	Ginetta G55 GT4	Ford Cyclone 3.7 L V6	88	(United Kingdom) Joshua Jackson	S	3–5
(United Kingdom) Team HARD Racing	Ginetta G55 GT4	Ford Cyclone 3.7 L V6	88	(United Kingdom) Alex Reed	S	6
(United Kingdom) Team HARD Racing	Ginetta G55 GT4	Ford Cyclone 3.7 L V6	88	(United Kingdom) Graham Roberts	S	8–9
(United Kingdom) Century Motorsport	BMW M4 GT4	BMW N55 3.0 L Twin Turbo I6	42	(United Kingdom) Ben Green	S	All
(United Kingdom) Century Motorsport	BMW M4 GT4	BMW N55 3.0 L Twin Turbo I6	42	(United Kingdom) Ben Tuck	S	All
(United Kingdom) Century Motorsport	BMW M4 GT4	BMW N55 3.0 L Twin Turbo I6	43	(United Kingdom) Jack Mitchell	S	All
(United Kingdom) Century Motorsport	BMW M4 GT4	BMW N55 3.0 L Twin Turbo I6	43	(United Kingdom) Ricky Collard	S	1–2
(United Kingdom) Century Motorsport	BMW M4 GT4	BMW N55 3.0 L Twin Turbo I6	43	(Norway) Aleksander Schjerpen	S	3–6
(United Kingdom) Century Motorsport	BMW M4 GT4	BMW N55 3.0 L Twin Turbo I6	43	(United Kingdom) Dean MacDonald	S	7–9
(United Kingdom) HHC Motorsport	Ginetta G55 GT4	Ford Cyclone 3.7 L V6	50	(United Kingdom) Will Burns	PA	1–8
(United Kingdom) HHC Motorsport	Ginetta G55 GT4	Ford Cyclone 3.7 L V6	50	(United Kingdom) Mike Newbould	PA	1–8
(United Kingdom) HHC Motorsport	Ginetta G55 GT4	Ford Cyclone 3.7 L V6	55	(Denmark) Patrik Matthiesen	S	All
(United Kingdom) HHC Motorsport	Ginetta G55 GT4	Ford Cyclone 3.7 L V6	55	(United Kingdom) Callum Pointon	S	All
(United Kingdom) UltraTek Racing / Team RJN	Nissan 370Z GT4	Nissan 3.7 L V6	53	(United Kingdom) Kelvin Fletcher	PA	All
(United Kingdom) UltraTek Racing / Team RJN	Nissan 370Z GT4	Nissan 3.7 L V6	53	(United Kingdom) Martin Plowman	PA	All
(United Kingdom) UltraTek Racing / Team RJN	Nissan 370Z GT4	Nissan 3.7 L V6	54	(Finland) Jesse Antilla	PA	1–5
(United Kingdom) UltraTek Racing / Team RJN	Nissan 370Z GT4	Nissan 3.7 L V6	54	(United Kingdom) Stephen Johansen	PA	1–5, 9
(United Kingdom) UltraTek Racing / Team RJN	Nissan 370Z GT4	Nissan 3.7 L V6	54	(United Kingdom) JM Littman	PA	9
(United Kingdom) Academy Motorsports	Aston Martin V8 Vantage GT4	Aston Martin 4.7 L V8	61	(Denmark) Jan Jønck	S	All
(United Kingdom) Academy Motorsports	Aston Martin V8 Vantage GT4	Aston Martin 4.7 L V8	61	(United Kingdom) Tom Wood	S	All
(United Kingdom) Academy Motorsports	Aston Martin V8 Vantage GT4	Aston Martin 4.7 L V8	62	(United Kingdom) Matt Nicoll-Jones	S	All
(United Kingdom) Academy Motorsports	Aston Martin V8 Vantage GT4	Aston Martin 4.7 L V8	62	(United Kingdom) Will Moore	S	All
(United Kingdom) Team Parker Racing	Mercedes-AMG GT4	Mercedes-AMG M178 4.0 L V8	66	(United Kingdom) Nick Jones	PA	All
(United Kingdom) Team Parker Racing	Mercedes-AMG GT4	Mercedes-AMG M178 4.0 L V8	66	(United Kingdom) Scott Malvern	PA	All
(United Kingdom) Steller Performance	Toyota GT86 GT4	Toyota 2.0L Flat-4	68	(United Kingdom) Tom Canning	S	1–6
(United Kingdom) Steller Performance	Toyota GT86 GT4	Toyota 2.0L Flat-4	68	(United Kingdom) Sennan Fielding	S	1–6
(United Kingdom) Steller Performance	Toyota GT86 GT4	Toyota 2.0L Flat-4	86	(United Kingdom) Dean MacDonald	S	1–6
(United Kingdom) Steller Performance	Toyota GT86 GT4	Toyota 2.0L Flat-4	86	(United Kingdom) Alex Quinn	S	1–6
(United Kingdom) Steller Performance	Toyota GT86 GT4	Toyota 2.0L Flat-4	86	(United Kingdom) Sennan Fielding	PA	8–9
(United Kingdom) Steller Performance	Toyota GT86 GT4	Toyota 2.0L Flat-4	86	(United Kingdom) Richard Williams	PA	8–9
(United Kingdom) Track-Club	McLaren 570S GT4	McLaren 3.8L Turbo V8	72	(United Kingdom) Adam Balon	PA	1–7
(United Kingdom) Track-Club	McLaren 570S GT4	McLaren 3.8L Turbo V8	72	(United Kingdom) Ben Barnicoat	PA	1–5, 7
(United Kingdom) Track-Club	McLaren 570S GT4	McLaren 3.8L Turbo V8	72	(United Kingdom) Euan Hankey	PA	6
(United Kingdom) Balfe Motorsport/PMW Expo Racing	McLaren 570S GT4	McLaren 3.8 L Turbo V8	72	(United Kingdom) Adam Balon	PA	9
(United Kingdom) Balfe Motorsport/PMW Expo Racing	McLaren 570S GT4	McLaren 3.8 L Turbo V8	72	(United Kingdom) Ben Barnicoat	PA	9
(United Kingdom) Balfe Motorsport/PMW Expo Racing	McLaren 570S GT4	McLaren 3.8 L Turbo V8	501	(United Kingdom) Graham Johnson	PA	1–8
(United Kingdom) Balfe Motorsport/PMW Expo Racing	McLaren 570S GT4	McLaren 3.8 L Turbo V8	501	(United Kingdom) Mike Robinson	PA	1–8
(United Kingdom) Fox Motorsport	Mercedes-AMG GT4	Mercedes-AMG M178 4.0 L V8	77	(United Kingdom) Michael Broadhurst	PA	1–8
(United Kingdom) Fox Motorsport	Mercedes-AMG GT4	Mercedes-AMG M178 4.0 L V8	77	(United Kingdom) Mark Murfitt	PA	1–8
(United Kingdom) ProTechnika Motorsport	Mercedes-AMG GT4	Mercedes-AMG M178 4.0 L V8	89	(United Kingdom) Anna Walewska	PA	7–9
(United Kingdom) ProTechnika Motorsport	Mercedes-AMG GT4	Mercedes-AMG M178 4.0 L V8	89	(United Kingdom) Tom Canning	PA	7–9
(United Kingdom) Generation AMR Super Racing	Aston Martin V8 Vantage GT4	Aston Martin 4.7 L V8	144	(United Kingdom) Matt George	PA	6
(United Kingdom) Generation AMR Super Racing	Aston Martin V8 Vantage GT4	Aston Martin 4.7 L V8	144	(United Kingdom) James Holder	PA	6

Icon	Class
PA	Pro-Am Cup
S	Silver Cup

== Race results ==
Bold indicates overall winner for each car class (GT3 and GT4).

Event	Circuit	GT3				GT4		
Event	Circuit	Pole position	Pro-Am winners	Silver winners	GTC winners	Pole position	Pro-Am winners	Silver winners
1	Oulton Park	(United Kingdom) No. 75 Optimum Motorsport	**(United Kingdom) No. 75 Optimum Motorsport**	(United Kingdom) No. 24 RJN Motorsport	No Entrants	(United Kingdom) No. 55 HHC Motorsport	**(United Kingdom) No. 72 Track-Club**	(United Kingdom) No. 4 Tolman Motorsport
1	Oulton Park	(United Kingdom) Jonny Adam (United Kingdom) Flick Haigh	**(United Kingdom) Jonny Adam** **(United Kingdom) Flick Haigh**	(United Kingdom) Devon Modell (United Kingdom) Stuarn Moore	No Entrants	(Denmark) Patrik Matthiesen (United Kingdom) Callum Pointon	**(United Kingdom) Adam Balon** **(United Kingdom) Ben Barnicoat**	(United Kingdom) Charlie Fagg (United Kingdom) Michael O'Brien
2	Oulton Park	(United Kingdom) No. 33 Barwell Motorsport	**(United Kingdom) No. 33 Barwell Motorsport**	(United Kingdom) No. 24 RJN Motorsport	No Entrants	(United Kingdom) No. 66 Team Parker Racing	**(United Kingdom) No. 66 Team Parker Racing**	(United Kingdom) No. 43 Century Motorsport
2	Oulton Park	(United Kingdom) Phil Keen (United Kingdom) Jon Minshaw	**(United Kingdom) Phil Keen** **(United Kingdom) Jon Minshaw**	(United Kingdom) Devon Modell (United Kingdom) Stuarn Moore	No Entrants	(United Kingdom) Nick Jones (United Kingdom) Scott Malvern	**(United Kingdom) Nick Jones** **(United Kingdom) Scott Malvern**	(United Kingdom) Ricky Collard (United Kingdom) Jack Mitchell
3	Rockingham	(United Kingdom) No. 33 Barwell Motorsport	**(United Kingdom) No. 116 ERC Sport**	No Finishers	No Entrants	(United Kingdom) No. 4 Tolman Motorsport	(United Kingdom) No. 54 UltraTek Racing/Team RJN	**(United Kingdom) No. 55 HHC Motorsport**
3	Rockingham	(United Kingdom) Phil Keen (United Kingdom) Jon Minshaw	**(Netherlands) Yelmer Buurman** **(United Kingdom) Lee Mowle**	No Finishers	No Entrants	(United Kingdom) Charlie Fagg (United Kingdom) Michael O'Brien	(Finland) Jesse Antilla (United Kingdom) Stephen Johansen	**(Denmark) Patrik Mathiesen** **(United Kingdom) Callum Pointon**
4	Snetterton	(United Kingdom) No. 11 TF Sport AMR	**(United Kingdom) No. 11 TF Sport AMR**	(United Kingdom) No. 24 RJN Motorsport	No Entrants	(United Kingdom) No. 42 Century Motorsport	**(United Kingdom) No. 56 Tolman Motorsport**	(United Kingdom) No. 4 Tolman Motorsport
4	Snetterton	(United Kingdom) Mark Farmer (Denmark) Nicki Thiim	**(United Kingdom) Mark Farmer** **(Denmark) Nicki Thiim**	(United Kingdom) Stuarn Moore (United Kingdom) Jordan Witt	No Entrants	(United Kingdom) Ben Green (United Kingdom) Ben Tuck	**(United Kingdom) Joe Osborne** **(United Kingdom) David Pattison**	(United Kingdom) Charlie Fagg (United Kingdom) Michael O'Brien
5	Snetterton	(United Kingdom) No. 11 TF Sport AMR	**(United Kingdom) No. 17 TF Sport AMR**	(United Kingdom) No. 24 RJN Motorsport	No Entrants	(United Kingdom) No. 62 Academy Motorsports	(United Kingdom) No. 501 Balfe Motorsport/PMW Expo Racing	**(United Kingdom) No. 42 Century Motorsport**
5	Snetterton	(United Kingdom) Mark Farmer (Denmark) Nicki Thiim	**(United Kingdom) Derek Johnston** **(Denmark) Marco Sørensen**	(United Kingdom) Stuarn Moore (United Kingdom) Jordan Witt	No Entrants	(United Kingdom) Will Moore (United Kingdom) Matt Nicoll-Jones	(United Kingdom) Graham Johnson (United Kingdom) Mike Robinson	**(United Kingdom) Ben Green** **(United Kingdom) Ben Tuck**
6	Silverstone	(United Kingdom) No. 24 RJN Motorsport	**(United Kingdom) No. 11 TF Sport AMR**	(United Kingdom) No. 24 RJN Motorsport	No Entrants	(Netherlands) No. 10 Equipe Verschuur	(United Kingdom) No. 53 UltraTek Racing/Team RJN	**(United Kingdom) No. 43 Century Motorsport**
6	Silverstone	(United Kingdom) Stuarn Moore (Mexico) Ricardo Sánchez	**(United Kingdom) Mark Farmer** **(Denmark) Nicki Thiim**	(United Kingdom) Stuarn Moore (Mexico) Ricardo Sánchez	No Entrants	(United Kingdom) Finlay Hutchison (United Kingdom) Daniel McKay	(United Kingdom) Kelvin Fletcher (United Kingdom) Martin Plowman	**(United Kingdom) Jack Mitchell** **(Norway) Aleksander Schjerpen**
7	Spa-Francorchamps	(United Kingdom) No. 75 Optimum Motorsport	**(United Kingdom) No. 47 Jetstream Motorsport AMR**	(United Kingdom) No. 24 RJN Motorsport	No Entrants	(United Kingdom) No. 4 Tolman Motorsport	(United Kingdom) No. 66 Team Parker Racing	**(United Kingdom) No. 43 Century Motorsport**
7	Spa-Francorchamps	(United Kingdom) Jonny Adam (United Kingdom) Flick Faigh	**(United Kingdom) Graham Davidson** **(Belgium) Maxime Martin**	(United Kingdom) Struan Moore (United Kingdom) Jordan Witt	No Entrants	(United Kingdom) Charlie Fagg (United Kingdom) Michael O'Brien	(United Kingdom) Nick Jones (United Kingdom) Scott Malvern	**(United Kingdom) Dean MacDonald** **(United Kingdom) Jack Mitchell**
8	Brands Hatch	(United Kingdom) No. 75 Optimum Motorsport	**(United Kingdom) No. 75 Optimum Motorsport**	No Entrants	No Entrants	(United Kingdom) No. 43 Century Motorsport	**(United Kingdom) No. 501 Balfe Motorsport/PMW Expo Racing**	(United Kingdom) No. 42 Century Motorsport
8	Brands Hatch	(United Kingdom) Jonny Adam (United Kingdom) Flick Haigh	**(United Kingdom) Jonny Adam** **(United Kingdom) Flick Haigh**	No Entrants	No Entrants	(United Kingdom) Dean MacDonald (United Kingdom) Jack Mitchell	**(United Kingdom) Graham Johnson** **(United Kingdom) Mike Robinson**	(United Kingdom) Ben Green (United Kingdom) Ben Tuck
9	Donington Park	(United Kingdom) No. 33 Barwell Motorsport	**(United Kingdom) No. 33 Barwell Motorsport**	No Entrants	(United Kingdom) No. 70 JMH Auto	(United Kingdom) No. 42 Century Motorsport	(United Kingdom) No. 56 Tolman Motorsport	**(Netherlands) No. 10 Equipe Verschuur**
9	Donington Park	(United Kingdom) Phil Keen (United Kingdom) Jon Minshaw	**(United Kingdom) Phil Keen** **(United Kingdom) Jon Minshaw**	No Entrants	(United Kingdom) Marcus Clutton (United Kingdom) John Seale	(United Kingdom) Ben Green (United Kingdom) Ben Tuck	(United Kingdom) Joe Osborne (United Kingdom) David Pattison	**(United Kingdom) Finlay Hutchison** **(United Kingdom) Daniel McKay**

== Championship standings ==
Points are awarded as follows:

Length	1	2	3	4	5	6	7	8	9	10
60 mins	25	18	15	12	10	8	6	4	2	1
60+ mins	37.5	27	22.5	18	15	12	9	6	3	1.5

=== Drivers' championships ===
==== Overall ====
Pos.	Driver	Team	OUL		ROC	SNE		SIL	SPA	BRH	DON	Points
GT3
1	(United Kingdom) Jonny Adam (United Kingdom) Flick Haigh	(United Kingdom) Optimum Motorsport	**1**	DNS	4	4	4	3	**3**	**1**	4	167.5
2	(United Kingdom) Phil Keen (United Kingdom) Jon Minshaw	(United Kingdom) Barwell Motorsport	4	**1**	**6**	3	5	2	5	23	**1**	159.5
3	(United Kingdom) Mark Farmer (Denmark) Nicki Thiim	(United Kingdom) TF Sport AMR	11	3	8	**1**	**3**	1	Ret	3	2	148
4	(Netherlands) Yelmer Buurman (United Kingdom) Lee Mowle	(United Kingdom) ERC Sport	3	4	1	7	7	10	4	5	3	133.5
5	(United Kingdom) Andrew Howard (United Kingdom) Darren Turner	(United Kingdom) Beechdean AMR	2	6	3	11	2	9	Ret	4	5	102.5
6	(United Kingdom) Derek Johnston (Denmark) Marco Sørensen	(United Kingdom) TF Sport AMR	9	2	7	6	1	5	7	6	Ret	98
7	(United Kingdom) Graham Davidson (Belgium) Maxime Martin	(United Kingdom) Jetstream Motorsport AMR	10	8	5	2	9	13	1	Ret	11	77.5
8	(United Kingdom) Jonny Cocker (United Kingdom) Sam De Haan	(United Kingdom) Barwell Motorsport	6	10	Ret	5	10	7	8	2	6	75
9	(United Kingdom) Ian Loggie (United Kingdom) Callum MacLeod	(United Kingdom) Team Parker Racing	7	5	2	9	Ret	12	6	7	8	72
10	(United Kingdom) Rick Parfitt, Jr.	(United Kingdom) Team Parker Racing	13	10	9	10	8	6	2	24	7	60
11	(United Kingdom) Ryan Ratcliffe	(United Kingdom) Team Parker Racing	13	10	9	10	8		2	24	7	48
12	(United Kingdom) Struan Moore	(United Kingdom) RJN Motorsport	12	11	Ret	8	6	**4**	10		9	33
13	(Mexico) Ricardo Sánchez	(United Kingdom) Team RJN Motorsport						**4**				18
14	(Finland) Patrick Kujala (Russia) Leo Machitski	(United Kingdom) Barwell Motorsport	5	7								16
15	(United Kingdom) Jordan Witt	(United Kingdom) RJN Motorsport				8	6		10			15
16	(United Kingdom) Seb Morris	(United Kingdom) Team Parker Racing						6				12
17	(United Kingdom) Shaun Balfe (United Kingdom) Rob Bell	(United Kingdom) Balfe Motorsport	8	12	Ret			8	Ret			10
18	(United Kingdom) Chris Buncombe	(United Kingdom) RJN Motorsport									9	3
19	(United Kingdom) Graham Johnson (United Kingdom) Mike Robinson	(United Kingdom) Balfe Motorsport									10	1.5
	(United Kingdom) Devon Modell	(United Kingdom) RJN Motorsport	12	11	Ret							0
Entries ineligible to score points
	(United Kingdom) Tom Onslow-Cole (Netherlands) Remon Vos	(United Kingdom) Ram Racing							9			
	(United Kingdom) Michael Brown (United Kingdom) Matt Manderson	(United Kingdom) Ultimate Speed						11				
	(United Kingdom) Marcus Clutton (United Kingdom) John Seale	(United Kingdom) JMH Auto									12	
	(United Kingdom) Adam Christodoulou (United Kingdom) Richard Neary	(United Kingdom) Team ABBA Racing						Ret	Ret			
GT4
1	(United Kingdom) Jack Mitchell	(United Kingdom) Century Motorsport	16	15	21	30	18	14	11	**14**	20	124
2	(United Kingdom) Ben Green (United Kingdom) Ben Tuck	(United Kingdom) Century Motorsport	20	27	16	**17**	11	18	14	9	**17**	123
3	(United Kingdom) Charlie Fagg (United Kingdom) Michael O'Brien	(United Kingdom) Tolman Motorsport	15	19	**14**	13	16	Ret	**12**	16	14	122
4	(Denmark) Patrik Matthiesen (United Kingdom) Callum Pointon	(United Kingdom) HHC Motorsport	**22**	16	10	19	15	17	17	13	18	116.5
5	(United Kingdom) Will Moore Matt (United Kingdom) Nicoll-Jones	(United Kingdom) Academy Motorsports	Ret	24	12	14	**13**	16	16	Ret	Ret	87
6	(United Kingdom) Joe Osborne (United Kingdom) David Pattison	(United Kingdom) Tolman Motorsport	18	20	25	12	17	Ret	Ret	12	15	82.5
7	(United Kingdom) Nick Jones (United Kingdom) Scott Malvern	(United Kingdom) Team Parker Racing	33	**13**	20	15	20	24	15	11	19	81.5
8	(United Kingdom) Finlay Hutchison (United Kingdom) Daniel McKay	(Netherlands) Equipe Verschuur	25	34	15	18	28	**28**	13	18	13	79.5
9	(United Kingdom) Kelvin Fletcher (United Kingdom) Martin Plowman	(United Kingdom) UltraTek Racing/Team RJN	32	17	13	22	22	19	20	10	Ret	65.5
10	(United Kingdom) Graham Johnson (United Kingdom) Mike Robinson	(United Kingdom) Balfe Motorsport/PMW Expo Racing	17	23	19	Ret	14	27	Ret	8		63
11	(United Kingdom) Jordan Albert (United Kingdom) Lewis Proctor	(United Kingdom) Tolman Motorsport	19	25	17	24	12	15	Ret	Ret	23	60.5
12	(United Kingdom) Dean MacDonald	(United Kingdom) Steller Performance	27	29	24	Ret	Ret	Ret				52.5
12	(United Kingdom) Dean MacDonald	(United Kingdom) Century Motorsport							11	**14**	20	52.5
13	(United Kingdom) Adam Balon	(United Kingdom) Track-Club	14	18	28	16	Ret	Ret	DNS			43
13	(United Kingdom) Adam Balon	(United Kingdom) Balfe Motorsport/PMW Expo Racing									Ret	43
13	(United Kingdom) Ben Barnicoat	(United Kingdom) Track-Club	14	18	28	16	Ret		DNS			43
13	(United Kingdom) Ben Barnicoat	(United Kingdom) Balfe Motorsport/PMW Expo Racing									Ret	43
14	(Norway) Aleksander Schjerpen	(United Kingdom) Century Motorsport			21	30	18	14				41.5
15	(United Kingdom) Ricky Collard	(United Kingdom) Century Motorsport	16	15								30
16	(United Kingdom) Will Burns (United Kingdom) Mike Newbould	(United Kingdom) HHC Motorsport	34	14	26	29	29	21	21	DSQ		28.5
17	(United Kingdom) Stephen Johansen	(United Kingdom) UltraTek Racing/Team RJN	29	33	11	25	27				28	27
17	(Finland) Jesse Antilla	(United Kingdom) UltraTek Racing/Team RJN	29	33	11	25	27					27
18	(United Kingdom) Sennan Fielding	(United Kingdom) Steller Performance	26	31	Ret	20	23	Ret		15	16	26
19	(United Kingdom) Richard Williams	(United Kingdom) Steller Performance								15	16	24
20	(Denmark) Jan Jønck (United Kingdom) Tom Wood	(United Kingdom) Academy Motorsports	23	21	18	26	24	25	19	22	25	12
21	(United Kingdom) Michael Broadhurst (United Kingdom) Mark Murfitt	(United Kingdom) Fox Motorsport	21	22	22	21	19	DSQ	Ret	21		8
22	(United Kingdom) Callum Hawkins-Row	(United Kingdom) Team HARD Racing	28	32	Ret	31	25	22				6
22	(United Kingdom) Jordan Stilp	(United Kingdom) Team HARD Racing						22				6
23	(United Kingdom) Steve McCulley	(United Kingdom) Invictus Games Racing	31	26	23	23	21				21	3
23	(United States) Jason Wolfe	(United Kingdom) Invictus Games Racing	30	28	Ret	28	Ret	26	DNS	19	21	3
24	(United Kingdom) Benjamin Wallace	(United Kingdom) Team HARD Racing	24	30	27	27	26	23		25	24	3
24	(United Kingdom) Alex Reed	(United Kingdom) Team HARD Racing						23				3
25	(United Kingdom) Tom Canning (Note: Tom Canning & Anna Walewska were ineligible to score points with ProTechnika Motorsport because the car was not a full season entrant.)	(United Kingdom) Steller Performance	26	31	Ret	20	23	Ret				2
25	(United Kingdom) Tom Canning	(United Kingdom) ProTechnika Motorsport							18	17	22	2
	(United Kingdom) Basil Rawlinson	(United Kingdom) Invictus Games Racing						26	DNS	19		0
	(United Kingdom) Matt George (Note: Matthew George was ineligible to score points with Generation AMR Super Racing as their car was not a full season entrant.)	(United Kingdom) Invictus Games Racing	31	26	23	23	21	Ret	Ret	20	26	0
	(United Kingdom) Matt George	(United Kingdom) Generation AMR Super Racing						20				0
	(United Kingdom) Paul Vice	(United Kingdom) Invictus Games Racing						Ret	Ret	20	26	0
	(United Kingdom) Graham Roberts	(United Kingdom) Team HARD Racing								25	24	0
	(United Kingdom) Alex Quinn	(United Kingdom) Steller Performance	27	29	24	Ret	Ret	Ret				0
	(United Kingdom) William Philips	(United Kingdom) Team HARD Racing	24	30								0
	(United Kingdom) Anna Walewska	(United Kingdom) Team HARD Racing	28	32	Ret	31	25					0
	(United Kingdom) Anna Walewska	(United Kingdom) ProTechnika Motorsport							18	17	22	0
	(United Kingdom) Joshua Jackson	(United Kingdom) Team HARD Racing			27	27	26					0
	(United Kingdom) Ben Norfolk	(United Kingdom) Invictus Games Racing	30	28	Ret	28	Ret					0
	(United Kingdom) JM Littman	(United Kingdom) UltraTek Racing/Team RJN									28	0
	(United Kingdom) Euan Hankey	(United Kingdom) Track-Club						Ret				0
Entries ineligible to score points
	(United Kingdom) James Holder	(United Kingdom) Generation AMR Super Racing						20				
	(United Kingdom) David Fairbrother (United Kingdom) Adam Morgan	(United Kingdom) Ciceley Motorsport									25	
Pos.	Driver	Team	OUL		ROC	SNE		SIL	SPA	BRH	DON	Points

Colour	Result
Gold	Winner
Silver	Second place
Bronze	Third place
Green	Points classification
Blue	Non-points classification
Blue	Non-classified finish (NC)
Purple	Retired, not classified (Ret)
Red	Did not qualify (DNQ)
Red	Did not pre-qualify (DNPQ)
Black	Disqualified (DSQ)
White	Did not start (DNS)
White	Withdrew (WD)
White	Race cancelled (C)
Blank	Did not practice (DNP)
Blank	Did not arrive (DNA)
Blank	Excluded (EX)

**Bold** indicates pole position

==== Pro-Am Cup ====
Pos.	Driver	Team	OUL		ROC	SNE		SIL	SPA	BRH	DON	Points
GT3
1	(United Kingdom) Jonny Adam (United Kingdom) Flick Haigh	(United Kingdom) Optimum Motorsport	**1**	DNS	4	4	4	3	**3**	**1**	4	167.5
2	(United Kingdom) Phil Keen (United Kingdom) Jon Minshaw	(United Kingdom) Barwell Motorsport	4	**1**	**6**	3	5	2	5	23	**1**	159.5
3	(United Kingdom) Mark Farmer (Denmark) Nicki Thiim	(United Kingdom) TF Sport AMR	11	3	8	**1**	**3**	**1**	Ret	3	2	148
4	(Netherlands) Yelmer Buurman (United Kingdom) Lee Mowle	(United Kingdom) ERC Sport	3	4	1	7	7	10	4	5	3	137
5	(United Kingdom) Andrew Howard (United Kingdom) Darren Turner	(United Kingdom) Beechdean AMR	2	6	3	11	2	9	Ret	4	5	106.5
6	(United Kingdom) Derek Johnston (Denmark) Marco Sørensen	(United Kingdom) TF Sport AMR	9	2	7	6	1	5	7	6	Ret	101
7	(United Kingdom) Graham Davidson (Belgium) Maxime Martin	(United Kingdom) Jetstream Motorsport AMR	10	8	5	2	9	13	1	Ret	11	79.5
8	(United Kingdom) Jonny Cocker (United Kingdom) Sam De Haan	(United Kingdom) Barwell Motorsport	6	10	Ret	5	10	7	8	2	6	79
9	(United Kingdom) Ian Loggie (United Kingdom) Callum MacLeod	(United Kingdom) Team Parker Racing	7	5	2	9	Ret	12	6	7	8	75.5
10	(United Kingdom) Rick Parfitt, Jr.	(United Kingdom) Team Parker Racing	13	10	9	10	8	6	2	24	7	66
11	(United Kingdom) Ryan Ratcliffe	(United Kingdom) Team Parker Racing	13	10	9	10	8		2	24	7	51
12	(Finland) Patrick Kujala (Russia) Leo Machitski	(United Kingdom) Barwell Motorsport	5	7								16
13	(United Kingdom) Seb Morris	(United Kingdom) Team Parker Racing						6				15
14	(United Kingdom) Shaun Balfe (United Kingdom) Rob Bell	(United Kingdom) Balfe Motorsport	8	12	Ret			8	Ret			13
15	(United Kingdom) Chris Buncombe (United Kingdom) Struan Moore	(United Kingdom) RJN Motorsport									9	3
16	(United Kingdom) Graham Johnson (United Kingdom) Mike Robinson	(United Kingdom) Balfe Motorsport									10	1.5
Entries ineligible to score points
	(United Kingdom) Tom Onslow-Cole (Netherlands) Remon Vos	(United Kingdom) Ram Racing							9			
	(United Kingdom) Michael Brown (United Kingdom) Matt Manderson	(United Kingdom) Ultimate Speed						11				
	(United Kingdom) Marcus Clutton (United Kingdom) John Seale	(United Kingdom) JMH Auto									12	
	(United Kingdom) Adam Christodoulou (United Kingdom) Richard Neary	(United Kingdom) Team ABBA Racing						Ret	Ret			
GT4
1	(United Kingdom) Nick Jones (United Kingdom) Scott Malvern	(United Kingdom) Team Parker Racing	33	**13**	20	15	20	24	15	11	19	179
2	(United Kingdom) Kelvin Fletcher (United Kingdom) Martin Plowman	(United Kingdom) UltraTek Racing/Team RJN	32	17	13	22	22	19	20	10	Ret	153.5
3	(United Kingdom) Joe Osborne (United Kingdom) David Pattison	(United Kingdom) Tolman Motorsport	18	20	25	12	17	Ret	Ret	12	15	132.5
4	(United Kingdom) Graham Johnson (United Kingdom) Mike Robinson	(United Kingdom) Balfe Motorsport/PMW Expo Racing	17	23	19	Ret	14	27	Ret	8		124
5	(United Kingdom) Will Burns (United Kingdom) Mike Newbould	(United Kingdom) HHC Motorsport	34	14	26	29	29	21	21	DSQ		77.5
6	(United Kingdom) Michael Broadhurst (United Kingdom) Mark Murfitt	(United Kingdom) Fox Motorsport	21	22	22	21	19	DSQ	Ret	21		68
7	(United Kingdom) Stephen Johansen	(United Kingdom) UltraTek Racing/Team RJN	29	33	11	25	27				28	67.5
8	(United Kingdom) Matt George (Note: Matthew George was ineligible to score points with Generation AMR Super Racing as their car was not a full season entrant.)	(United Kingdom) Invictus Games Racing	31	26	23	23	21	Ret	Ret	20	26	62
8	(United Kingdom) Matt George	(United Kingdom) Generation AMR Super Racing						20				62
9	(United States) Jason Wolfe	(United Kingdom) Invictus Games Racing	30	28	Ret	28	Ret	26	DNS	19	21	60
10	(United Kingdom) Steve McCulley	(United Kingdom) Invictus Games Racing	31	26	23	23	21				21	56
11	(Finland) Jesse Antilla	(United Kingdom) UltraTek Racing/Team RJN	29	33	11	25	27					55.5
12	(United Kingdom) Adam Balon	(United Kingdom) Track-Club	14	18	28	16	Ret	Ret	DNS			55
12	(United Kingdom) Adam Balon	(United Kingdom) Balfe Motorsport/PMW Expo Racing									Ret	55
12	(United Kingdom) Ben Barnicoat	(United Kingdom) Track-Club	14	18	28	16	Ret		DNS			55
12	(United Kingdom) Ben Barnicoat	(United Kingdom) Balfe Motorsport/PMW Expo Racing									Ret	55
13	(United Kingdom) Sennan Fielding (United Kingdom) Richard Williams	(United Kingdom) Steller Performance								15	16	42
14	(United Kingdom) Basil Rawlinson	(United Kingdom) Invictus Games Racing						26	DNS	19		30
15	(United Kingdom) Paul Vice	(United Kingdom) Invictus Games Racing						Ret	Ret	20	26	24
16	(United Kingdom) Anna Walewska (Note: Tom Canning & Anna Walewska were ineligible to score points with ProTechnika Motorsport because the car was not a full season entrant.)	(United Kingdom) Team HARD Racing	28	32	Ret	31	25					18
16	(United Kingdom) Anna Walewska	(United Kingdom) ProTechnika Motorsport							18	17	22	18
16	(United Kingdom) Callum Hawkins-Row	(United Kingdom) Team HARD Racing	28	32	Ret	31	25					18
17	(United Kingdom) Ben Norfolk	(United Kingdom) Invictus Games Racing	30	28	Ret	28	Ret					12
17	(United Kingdom) JM Littman	(United Kingdom) UltraTek Racing/Team RJN									28	12
	(United Kingdom) Euan Hankey	(United Kingdom) Track-Club						Ret				0
	(United Kingdom) Tom Canning	(United Kingdom) ProTechnika Motorsport							18	17	22	0
Entries ineligible to score points
	(United Kingdom) James Holder	(United Kingdom) Generation AMR Super Racing						20				
	(United Kingdom) David Fairbrother (United Kingdom) Adam Morgan	(United Kingdom) Ciceley Motorsport									25	
Pos.	Driver	Team	OUL		ROC	SNE		SIL	SPA	BRH	DON	Points

==== Silver Cup ====
Pos.	Driver	Team	OUL		ROC	SNE		SIL	SPA	BRH	DON	Points
GT3
1	(United Kingdom) Struan Moore	(United Kingdom) RJN Motorsport	**12**	**11**	**Ret**	**8**	**6**	**4**	**10**			87.5
2	(United Kingdom) Jordan Witt	(United Kingdom) RJN Motorsport				**8**	**6**		**10**			43.75
3	(United Kingdom) Devon Modell	(United Kingdom) RJN Motorsport	**12**	**11**	**Ret**							25
4	(Mexico) Ricardo Sánchez	(United Kingdom) RJN Motorsport						**4**				18.75
GT4
1	(United Kingdom) Jack Mitchell	(United Kingdom) Century Motorsport	16	15	21	30	18	14	11	**14**	20	170.5
2	(United Kingdom) Charlie Fagg (United Kingdom) Michael O'Brien	(United Kingdom) Tolman Motorsport	15	19	**14**	13	16	Ret	**12**	16	14	169.5
3	(United Kingdom) Ben Green (United Kingdom) Ben Tuck	(United Kingdom) Century Motorsport	20	27	16	**17**	11	18	14	9	**17**	166
4	(Denmark) Patrik Matthiesen (United Kingdom) Callum Pointon	(United Kingdom) HHC Motorsport	**22**	16	10	19	15	17	17	13	18	162.5
5	(United Kingdom) Finlay Hutchison (United Kingdom) Daniel McKay	(Netherlands) Equipe Verschuur	25	34	15	18	28	**28**	13	18	13	113
6	(United Kingdom) Will Moore (United Kingdom) Matt Nicoll-Jones	(United Kingdom) Academy Motorsport	Ret	24	12	14	**13**	16	16	Ret	Ret	107.5
7	(United Kingdom) Jordan Albert (United Kingdom) Lewis Proctor	(United Kingdom) Tolman Motorsport	19	25	17	24	12	15	Ret	Ret	23	98
8	(United Kingdom) Dean MacDonald	(United Kingdom) Steller Performance	27	29	24	Ret	Ret	Ret				83
8	(United Kingdom) Dean MacDonald	(United Kingdom) Century Motorsport							11	**14**	20	83
9	(Denmark) Jan Jønck (United Kingdom) Tom Wood	(United Kingdom) Academy Motorsports	23	21	18	26	24	25	19	22	25	70
10	(Norway) Aleksander Schjerpen	(United Kingdom) Century Motorsport			21	30	18	14				52.5
11	(United Kingdom) Ricky Collard	(United Kingdom) Century Motorsport	16	15								43
12	(United Kingdom) Benjamin Wallace	(United Kingdom) Team HARD Racing	24	30	27	27	26	23		25	24	40.5
13	(United Kingdom) Graham Roberts	(United Kingdom) Team HARD Racing								25	24	18
14	(United Kingdom) Tom Canning (United Kingdom) Sennan Fielding	(United Kingdom) Steller Performance	26	31	Ret	20	23	Ret				17
15	(United Kingdom) Callum Hawkins-Row (United Kingdom) Jordan Stilp	(United Kingdom) Team HARD Racing						22				12
16	(United Kingdom) Alex Reed	(United Kingdom) Team HARD Racing						23				9
17	(United Kingdom) Alex Quinn	(United Kingdom) Steller Performance	27	29	24	Ret	Ret	Ret				8
18	(United Kingdom) William Philips	(United Kingdom) Team HARD Racing	24	30								8
19	(United Kingdom) Joshua Jackson	(United Kingdom) Team HARD Racing			27	27	26					5.5
Pos.	Driver	Team	OUL		ROC	SNE		SIL	SPA	BRH	DON	Points

==== Blancpain Trophy ====
Pos.	Driver	Team	OUL		ROC	SNE		SIL	SPA	BRH	DON	Points
1	(United Kingdom) Flick Haigh	(United Kingdom) Optimum Motorsport	**1**^{1}	DNS	4	4	4	3	**3**	**1**	4	172.5
2	(United Kingdom) Jon Minshaw	(United Kingdom) Barwell Motorsport	4	**1**	**6**^{1}	3	5	2	5	8	**1**^{1}	169.5
3	(United Kingdom) Mark Farmer	(United Kingdom) TF Sport AMR	11	3	8	**1**^{1}	**3**	**1**^{1}	Ret	3	2	158
4	(United Kingdom) Lee Mowle	(United Kingdom) ERC Sport	3	4	1	7	6	9	4	5	3	137
5	(United Kingdom) Andrew Howard	(United Kingdom) Beechdean AMR	2	6	3	10	2	8	Ret	4	5	106.5
6	(United Kingdom) Derek Johnston	(United Kingdom) TF Sport AMR	9	2	7	6	1	4	7	6	Ret	101
7	(United Kingdom) Graham Davidson	(United Kingdom) Jetstream Motorsport AMR	10	8	5	2	8	12	1	Ret	11	79.5
8	(United Kingdom) Sam De Haan	(United Kingdom) Barwell Motorsport	6	9	Ret	5	9	6	8	2	6	79
9	(United Kingdom) Rick Parfitt, Jr.	(United Kingdom) Team Parker Racing	12	10	9	9	7	5	2^{1}	9^{1}	7	76
10	(United Kingdom) Ian Loggie	(United Kingdom) Team Parker Racing	7	5	2	8	Ret	11	6	7	8	75.5
11	(Russia) Leo Machitski	(United Kingdom) Barwell Motorsport	5	7								16
12	(United Kingdom) Shaun Balfe	(United Kingdom) Balfe Motorsport	8	11	Ret			7	Ret			13
13	(United Kingdom) Chris Buncombe	(United Kingdom) RJN Motorsport									9	3
14	(United Kingdom) Graham Johnson	(United Kingdom) Balfe Motorsport									10	1.5
Entries ineligible to score points
	(Netherlands) Remon Vos	(United Kingdom) Ram Racing							9			
	(United Kingdom) Michael Brown	(United Kingdom) Ultimate Speed						10				
	(United Kingdom) John Seale	(United Kingdom) JMH Auto									12	
	(United Kingdom) Richard Neary	(United Kingdom) Team ABBA Racing						Ret	Ret			
Pos.	Driver	Team	OUL		ROC	SNE		SIL	SPA	BRH	DON	Points

^{1} – Driver scored 5 points for being fastest in the Am Driver qualifying session.

=== Team's championship ===
Pos.	Team	Manufacturer	No.	OUL		ROC	SNE		SIL	SPA	BRH	DON	Points
GT3
1	(United Kingdom) TF Sport AMR	Aston Martin	11	11	3	8	**1**	**3**	1	Ret	3	2	249
1	(United Kingdom) TF Sport AMR	Aston Martin	17	9	2	7	6	1	5	7	6	Ret	249
2	(United Kingdom) Barwell Motorsport	Lamborghini	2	5	7								240.5
2	(United Kingdom) Barwell Motorsport	Lamborghini	33	4	**1**	**6**	3	5	2	5	23	**1**	240.5
2	(United Kingdom) Barwell Motorsport	Lamborghini	69	6	10	Ret	5	10	7	8	2	6	240.5
3	(United Kingdom) Optimum Motorsport	Aston Martin	75	**1**	DNS	4	4	4	3	**3**	**1**	4	167.5
4	(United Kingdom) Team Parker Racing	Bentley	1	13	10	9	10	8	6	2	24	7	135
4	(United Kingdom) Team Parker Racing	Bentley	7	7	5	2	9	Ret	12	6	7	8	135
5	(United Kingdom) ERC Sport	Mercedes-AMG	116	3	4	1	7	7	10	4	5	3	133.5
6	(United Kingdom) Beechdean AMR	Aston Martin	99	2	6	3	11	2	9	Ret	4	5	102.5
7	(United Kingdom) Jetstream Motorsport AMR	Aston Martin	47	10	8	5	2	9	13	1	Ret	11	78.5
8	(United Kingdom) Motul Team RJN Motorsport	Nissan	24	12	11	Ret	8	6	**4**	10		9	33
9	(United Kingdom) Balfe Motorsport	McLaren	101	8	12	Ret			8	Ret		10	13.5
Entries ineligible to score points
	(United Kingdom) Ram Racing	Mercedes-AMG	30							9			
	(United Kingdom) Ultimate Speed	Aston Martin	26						11				
	(United Kingdom) JMH Auto	Ferrari	70									12	
	(United Kingdom) Team ABBA Racing	Mercedes-AMG	8						Ret	Ret			
GT4
1	(United Kingdom) Century Motorsport	BMW	42	20	27	16	**17**	11	18	14	9	**17**	251
1	(United Kingdom) Century Motorsport	BMW	43	16	15	21	30	18	14	11	**14**	20	251
2	(United Kingdom) Tolman Motorsport	McLaren	4	15	19	**14**	13	16	Ret	**12**	16	14	249.5
2	(United Kingdom) Tolman Motorsport	McLaren	5	19	25	17	24	12	15	Ret	Ret	23	249.5
2	(United Kingdom) Tolman Motorsport	McLaren	56	18	20	25	12	17	Ret	Ret	12	15	249.5
3	(United Kingdom) HHC Motorsport	Ginetta	50	34	14	26	29	29	21	21	DSQ		147
3	(United Kingdom) HHC Motorsport	Ginetta	55	**22**	16	10	19	15	17	17	13	18	147
4	(United Kingdom) Academy Motorsports	Aston Martin	61	23	21	18	26	24	25	19	22	25	100
4	(United Kingdom) Academy Motorsports	Aston Martin	62	Ret	24	12	14	**13**	16	16	Ret	Ret	100
5	(United Kingdom) UltraTek Racing/Team RJN	Nissan	53	32	17	13	22	22	19	20	10	Ret	92.5
5	(United Kingdom) UltraTek Racing/Team RJN	Nissan	54	29	33	11	25	27				28	92.5
6	(United Kingdom) Team Parker Racing	Mercedes-AMG	66	33	**13**	20	15	20	24	15	11	19	82.5
7	(Netherlands) Equipe Verschuur	McLaren	10	25	34	15	18	28	**28**	13	18	13	79.5
8	(United Kingdom) Balfe Motorsport/PMW Expo Racing	McLaren	72									Ret	63
8	(United Kingdom) Balfe Motorsport/PMW Expo Racing	McLaren	501	17	23	19	Ret	14	27	Ret	8		63
9	(United Kingdom) Track-Club	McLaren	72	14	18	28	16	Ret	Ret	DNS			43
10	(United Kingdom) Steller Performance	Toyota	68	26	31	Ret	20	23	Ret				26
10	(United Kingdom) Steller Performance	Toyota	86	27	29	24	Ret	Ret	Ret		15	16	26
11	(United Kingdom) Fox Motorsport	Mercedes-AMG	77	21	22	22	21	19	DSQ	Ret	21		12
12	(United Kingdom) Team HARD Racing	Ginetta	34	28	32	Ret	31	25	22				11.5
12	(United Kingdom) Team HARD Racing	Ginetta	88	24	30	27	27	26	23		25	24	11.5
13	(United Kingdom) Invictus Games Racing	Jaguar	22	30	28	Ret	28	Ret	26	DNS	19	21	4
13	(United Kingdom) Invictus Games Racing	Jaguar	44	31	26	23	23	21	Ret	Ret	20	26	4
Entries ineligible to score points
	(United Kingdom) ProTechnika Motorsport	Mercedes-AMG	89							18	17	22	
	(United Kingdom) Generation AMR Super Racing	Aston Martin	144						20				
	(United Kingdom) Ciceley Motorsport	Mercedes-AMG	25									25	
Pos.	Team	Manufacturer	No.	OUL		ROC	SNE		SIL	SPA	BRH	DON	Points
