= CPRL =

CPRL may refer to:

- Coastal Plain Regional Library System, a public library system in the U.S. state of Georgia
- Plato Racing, a British racing team now known as CPRL
