= Osamu Kawashima =

Japanese racing driver (born 1969)

- Kawashima driving for Team VERTU at Silverstone Circuit in 2026
- Nationality: (Japan) Japanese
- Born: 26 January 1969 (age 57) Tokyo, Japan

British Touring Car Championship career
- Debut season: 2026
- Current team: Team VERTU
- Starts: 2
- Wins: 0
- Podiums: 0
- Poles: 0
- Fastest laps: 0
- Best finish: 27th in 2026

Previous series
- 2015 2014 2013: Ginetta GT4 Supercup; Ginetta GT5 Challenge; Ginetta GT Supercup

Osamu Kawashima (河嶋修, Osamu Kawashima; born 26 January 1969) is a Japanese racing driver who most recently competed in the British Touring Car Championship for Team VERTU.

Kawashima previously tested for Speedworks Motorsport in 2016, driving their Toyota Avensis touring car.

== Career ==
=== Ginetta G55 Supercup ===
For the final round of 2013, Kawashima entered the Ginetta GT Supercup in the G55 class. Kawashima scored a pair of P16 finishes, along with a P13.

=== Ginetta GT5 Challenge ===
Kawashima would stay with Century Motorsport for 2014, this time in the Ginetta GT5 Challenge.

=== British Touring Car Championship ===
In 2016, Kawashima got a BTCC test with Speedworks Motorsport. Coached by Tom Ingram, he labelled being helped by the future champion as helpful due to Ingram's previous career in Ginettas.

For 2026, Kawashima debuted in the British Touring Car Championship at Silverstone, replacing Ricky Collard at Team VERTU. However, he stepped down after the event, handing the car back to Collard.

== Racing record ==
=== Career summary ===
Season	Series	Team	Races	Wins	Poles	F/Laps	Podiums	Points	Position
2013	Ginetta GT Supercup – G55	Century Motorsport	3	0	0	0	0	29	21st
2014	Ginetta GT5 Challenge	Century Motorsport	19	0	0	0	0	77	18th
2015	Ginetta GT4 Supercup – Am	Century Motorsport	27	5	5	1	16	582	**2nd**
2026	British Touring Car Championship	Team VERTU	2	0	0	0	0	0	27th

=== Complete British Touring Car Championship results ===
(key) (Races in bold indicate pole position – 1 point awarded in first race; races in italics indicate fastest lap – 1 point awarded all races; * signifies that driver lead race for at least one lap – 1 point awarded all races; ^{Superscript} number indicates points-scoring qualifying race position)

Year	Team	Car	1	2	3	4	5	6	7	8	9	10	11	12	13	14	15	16	17	18	19	20	21	22	23	24	25	26	27	28	29	30	Pos	Points
2026	Team VERTU	Hyundai i30 Fastback N Performance	DON; 1	DON; 2	DON; 3	BRH; 1	BRH; 2	BRH; 3	SNE; 1	SNE; 2	SNE; 3	OUL; 1	OUL; 2	OUL; 3	THR; 1	THR; 2	THR; 3	KNO; 1	KNO; 2	KNO; 3	DON; 1	DON; 2	DON; 3	CRO; 1	CRO; 2	CRO; 3	SIL; 1; 22	SIL; 2; 22	SIL; 3 DNS	BRH; 1	BRH; 2	BRH; 3	27th	0
