= 2013 Ginetta GT Supercup =

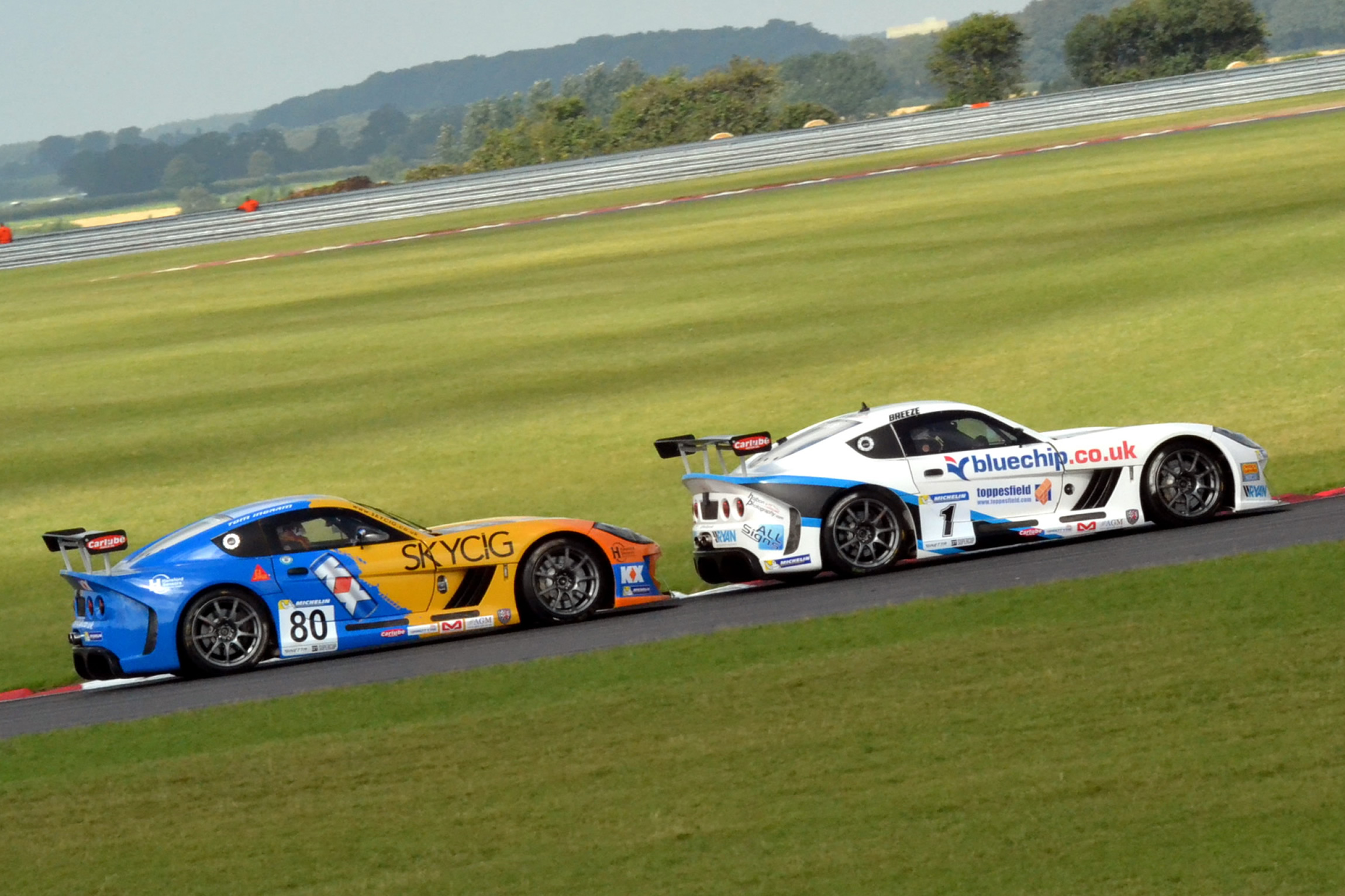
2013 champion Tom Ingram(#80) chasing runner-up Carl Breeze(#1).

The 2013 Ginetta GT Supercup is a multi-event, one make GT motor racing championship held across England and Scotland. The championship features a mix of professional motor racing teams and privately funded drivers, competing in a Ginetta G55 or Ginetta G50 that conform to the technical regulations for the championship. It forms part of the extensive program of support categories built up around the BTCC centrepiece.

This season will be the third Ginetta GT Supercup, having rebranded from the Ginetta G50 Cup, which ran between 2008 and 2010.

== Teams and drivers ==
Team	No.	Drivers	Rounds
G55
TCR	1	(United Kingdom) Carl Breeze	All
TCR	20	(United Kingdom) Alex MacDowall	9–10
TCR	44	(United Kingdom) David Dickenson	4
TCR	71	(United Kingdom) Jamie Orton	1–5
TCR	77	(United Kingdom) Mark Davies	All
Douglas Motorsport	11	(United Kingdom) Andrew Watson	All
Privateer	12	(United Kingdom) Reece Somerfield	2
Richardson Racing	12	(United Kingdom) Reece Somerfield	3–10
Century Motorsport	14	(United Kingdom) Tom Oliphant	8–9
Century Motorsport	17	(United Kingdom) Rob Smith	1
Century Motorsport	24	(United Kingdom) James Birch	1–3
Century Motorsport	70	(United Kingdom) Max Coates	5
Century Motorsport	71	(United Kingdom) Jamie Orton	6–10
Century Motorsport	72	(Japan) Osamu Kawashima	10
Century Motorsport	73	(United Kingdom) Nathan Freke	4
Century Motorsport	25	(Spain) Pepe Massot	6–7
Hillspeed	25	(Spain) Pepe Massot	1–5
JHR Developments	25	(Spain) Pepe Massot	8–10
JHR Developments	80	(United Kingdom) Tom Ingram	All
JHR Developments	95	(United Kingdom) Marcus Hoggarth	1–9
JHR Developments	99	(United Kingdom) Rob Boston	All
CBM Motorsport	41	(United Kingdom) Carl Boardley	All
Academy Motorsport	52	(United Kingdom) Sean Huyton	8–10
Academy Motorsport	88	(United Kingdom) Matt Nicoll-Jones	All
CWS	78	(United Kingdom) Colin White	2–7, 9–10
Priocept Racing	79	(United Kingdom) Dan Norris-Jones	4–10
Brad Bailey Racing	84	(United Kingdom) Brad Bailey	7
FW Motorsport	91	(United Kingdom) Fergus Walkinshaw	All
G50
Academy Motorsport	18	(United Kingdom) Will Burns	8–10
Academy Motorsport	52	(United Kingdom) Sean Huyton	1–6
Richardson Racing	22	(United Kingdom) Louise Richardson	9–10
Richardson Racing	53	(United Kingdom) Dan Jones	5
Matt Roach Racing	46	(United Kingdom) Robert Gaffney	9–10
Simon Green Motorsport	56	(United Kingdom) Simon Green	1
Priocept Racing	79	(United Kingdom) Dan Norris-Jones	1–3
Privateer	12	(United Kingdom) Reece Somerfield	1
Privateer	32	(United Kingdom) Mike Simpson	2, 4
Invitation
Ginetta Team Norway	23	(Norway) Steffen Feet	9
Ginetta Team Norway	33	(Norway) Andre Falkenhaug	9

== Race calendar and results ==
The series will last for 27 races over 10 rounds, and will support the British Touring Car Championship at all rounds.

Round		Circuit	Date	Pole position	Fastest lap	Winning driver	Winning team	Winning G50
1	R1	Brands Hatch (Indy), Kent	30 March	(United Kingdom) Jamie Orton	(United Kingdom) Tom Ingram	(United Kingdom) Carl Breeze	TCR	(United Kingdom) Reece Somerfield
1	R2	Brands Hatch (Indy), Kent	30 March		(United Kingdom) Tom Ingram	(Spain) Pepe Massot	Hillspeed	(United Kingdom) Reece Somerfield
1	R3	Brands Hatch (Indy), Kent	31 March		(United Kingdom) Tom Ingram	(United Kingdom) Tom Ingram	JHR Developments	(United Kingdom) Sean Huyton
2	R4	Donington Park, Leicestershire	20 April	(United Kingdom) Carl Breeze	(United Kingdom) Tom Ingram	(United Kingdom) Carl Breeze	TCR	(United Kingdom) Sean Huyton
2	R5	Donington Park, Leicestershire	21 April		(United Kingdom) Andrew Watson	(United Kingdom) Carl Breeze	TCR	(United Kingdom) Sean Huyton
2	R6	Donington Park, Leicestershire	21 April		(United Kingdom) Tom Ingram	(Spain) Pepe Massot	Hillspeed	(United Kingdom) Sean Huyton
3	R7	Thruxton Circuit, Hampshire	4 May	(United Kingdom) Fergus Walkinshaw	(United Kingdom) Carl Breeze	(United Kingdom) Carl Breeze	TCR	(United Kingdom) Sean Huyton
3	R8	Thruxton Circuit, Hampshire	4 May		(United Kingdom) Carl Breeze	(United Kingdom) Carl Breeze	TCR	(United Kingdom) Sean Huyton
3	R9	Thruxton Circuit, Hampshire	5 May		(United Kingdom) Tom Ingram	(United Kingdom) Tom Ingram	JHR Developments	(United Kingdom) Sean Huyton
4	R10	Oulton Park, Cheshire	8 June	(United Kingdom) Tom Ingram	(Spain) Pepe Massot	(United Kingdom) Nathan Freke	Century Motorsport	None
4	R11	Oulton Park, Cheshire	9 June		(United Kingdom) Nathan Freke	(United Kingdom) Nathan Freke	Century Motorsport	(United Kingdom) Sean Huyton
5	R12	Croft Circuit, North Yorkshire	22 June	(United Kingdom) Tom Ingram	(United Kingdom) Tom Ingram	(United Kingdom) Tom Ingram	JHR Developments	(United Kingdom) Sean Huyton
5	R13	Croft Circuit, North Yorkshire	23 June		(United Kingdom) Tom Ingram	(United Kingdom) Tom Ingram	JHR Developments	(United Kingdom) Sean Huyton
5	R14	Croft Circuit, North Yorkshire	23 June		(United Kingdom) Tom Ingram	(United Kingdom) Tom Ingram	JHR Developments	(United Kingdom) Sean Huyton
6	R15	Snetterton Motor Racing Circuit, Norfolk	3 August	(United Kingdom) Tom Ingram	(United Kingdom) Tom Ingram	(United Kingdom) Tom Ingram	JHR Developments	(United Kingdom) Sean Huyton
6	R16	Snetterton Motor Racing Circuit, Norfolk	4 August		(United Kingdom) Carl Breeze	(United Kingdom) Carl Breeze	TCR	(United Kingdom) Sean Huyton
6	R17	Snetterton Motor Racing Circuit, Norfolk	4 August		(United Kingdom) Mark Davies	(United Kingdom) Mark Davies	TCR	(United Kingdom) Sean Huyton
7	R18	Knockhill Racing Circuit, Fife	24 August	(United Kingdom) Andrew Watson	(United Kingdom) Rob Boston	(United Kingdom) Matt Nicoll-Jones	Academy Motorsport	None
7	R19	Knockhill Racing Circuit, Fife	25 August		(United Kingdom) Andrew Watson	(United Kingdom) Matt Nicoll-Jones	Academy Motorsport	None
7	R20	Knockhill Racing Circuit, Fife	25 August		(United Kingdom) Tom Ingram	(United Kingdom) Tom Ingram	JHR Developments	None
8	R21	Rockingham Motor Speedway, Northamptonshire	14 September	(United Kingdom) Tom Ingram	(United Kingdom) Tom Ingram	(United Kingdom) Tom Ingram	JHR Developments	(United Kingdom) Will Burns
8	R22	Rockingham Motor Speedway, Northamptonshire	15 September		(United Kingdom) Tom Ingram	(United Kingdom) Tom Ingram	JHR Developments	(United Kingdom) Will Burns
9	R23	Silverstone (National), Northamptonshire	28 September	(United Kingdom) Tom Ingram	(United Kingdom) Tom Ingram	(United Kingdom) Tom Ingram	JHR Developments	(United Kingdom) Louise Richardson
9	R24	Silverstone (National), Northamptonshire	29 September		(United Kingdom) Tom Ingram	(United Kingdom) Tom Ingram	JHR Developments	(United Kingdom) Louise Richardson
10	R25	Brands Hatch (GP), Kent	12 October	(United Kingdom) Rob Boston	(United Kingdom) Matt Nicoll-Jones	(United Kingdom) Rob Boston	JHR Developments	(United Kingdom) Louise Richardson
10	R26	Brands Hatch (GP), Kent	13 October		(United Kingdom) Rob Boston	(United Kingdom) Rob Boston	JHR Developments	(United Kingdom) Rob Gaffney
10	R27	Brands Hatch (GP), Kent	13 October		(United Kingdom) Jamie Orton	(United Kingdom) Jamie Orton	Century Motorsport	(United Kingdom) Louise Richardson

== Championship standings ==
A driver's best 25 scores counted towards the championship, with any other points being discarded.

Pos	Driver	BHI			DON			THR			OUL		CRO			SNE			KNO			ROC		SIL		BHGP			Pen.	Pts
G55 Supercup
1	(United Kingdom) Tom Ingram	5	4	1	2	2	2	3	2	1	2	2	1	1	1	1	2	3	2	2	1	1	1	1	1	Ret	DNS	DNS		763
2	(United Kingdom) Carl Breeze	1	6	Ret	1	1	Ret	1	1	2	4	4	2	3	Ret	2	1	4	3	3	4	8	7	7	3	6	3	6		626
3	(United Kingdom) Matt Nicoll-Jones	2	2	2	6	3	3	4	10	8	Ret	15	4	Ret	2	6	5	Ret	1	1	2	3	12	6	4	2	Ret	3		521
4	(United Kingdom) Rob Boston	4	7	6	3	4	4	11	11	14	Ret	Ret	3	2	6	4	6	5	5	8	12	2	6	3	5	1	1	4		514
5	(Spain) Pepe Massot	6	1	7	4	6	1	6	9	7	Ret	6	8	5	Ret	3	3	2	7	13	13	NC	5	2	2	3	2	9		492
6	(United Kingdom) Mark Davies	9	5	3	5	7	Ret	7	5	4	3	3	5	8	7	5	4	1	11	4	11	4	2	Ret	9	7	7	Ret		470
7	(United Kingdom) Andrew Watson	7	8	4	Ret	9	Ret	2	Ret	13	Ret	9	7	7	4	7	7	7	10	5	3	Ret	4	12	13	10	5	2		372
8	(United Kingdom) Jamie Orton	3	3	Ret	9	5	7	10	6	3	5	5	Ret	DNS	DNS	Ret	8	Ret	4	9	5	Ret	11	4	Ret	5	6	1		370
9	(United Kingdom) Carl Boardley	10	Ret	9	7	11	6	5	3	5	7	8	Ret	6	Ret	9	9	6	6	Ret	10	11	Ret	7	7	4	Ret	Ret		316
10	(United Kingdom) Reece Somerfield				Ret	10	8	9	4	6	6	7	9	9	Ret	8	10	Ret	8	6	Ret	5	10	10	10	9	4	7		295
11	(United Kingdom) Fergus Walkinshaw	12	11	5	10	12	Ret	8	7	9	8	16	11	12	8	11	Ret	DNS	15	7	6	9	8	14	12	Ret	DNS	DNS		244
12	(United Kingdom) Marcus Hoggarth	11	12	10	11	Ret	10	12	8	10	9	10	DNS	14	11	10	11	Ret	12	12	9	6	9	16	15					221
13	(United Kingdom) Dan Norris-Jones										11	13	12	10	10	12	Ret	8	14	11	8	10	Ret	15	14	DNS	12	12		152
14	(United Kingdom) Colin White				Ret	13	9	Ret	Ret	DNS	10	DNS	10	Ret	5	Ret	13	10	9	Ret	Ret			11	11	17	Ret	15		133
15	(United Kingdom) Sean Huyton																					12	3	8	6	11	Ret	5		97
16	(United Kingdom) James Birch	8	9	8	8	8	5	Ret	DNS	DNS																				88
17	(United Kingdom) Nathan Freke										1	1																		71
18	(United Kingdom) Alex MacDowall																							9	8	8	8	8		68
19	(United Kingdom) Max Coates												6	4	3															66
20	(United Kingdom) Brad Bailey																		13	10	7									35
21	(United Kingdom) Tom Oliphant																					7	13	13	Ret					32
21	(Japan) Osamu Kawashima																									16	13	16		29
23	(United Kingdom) Rob Smith	17	14	11																										27
23	(United Kingdom) David Dickenson										12	11																		19
G50 Cup
1	(United Kingdom) Sean Huyton	16	13	12	12	14	11	13	12	11	Ret	14	13	11	9	13	12	9												565
2	(United Kingdom) Dan Norris-Jones	14	15	Ret	14	16	12	14	13	12																				236
3	(United Kingdom) Will Burns																					13	14	18	18	14	11	11		215
4	(United Kingdom) Louise Richardson																							17	16	12	10	10		176
5	(United Kingdom) Rob Gaffney																							19	19	13	9	13		144
6	(United Kingdom) Reece Somerfield	13	10	13																										100
7	(United Kingdom) Dan Jones												14	13	12															90
8	(United Kingdom) Simon Green	15	16	Ret																										48
9	(United Kingdom) Oliver Basey-Fisher																									15	Ret	14		44
guest drivers ineligible for points
	(United Kingdom) Mike Simpson				13	15	DNS				13	12																		0
	(Norway) Steffen Feet																							20	17					0
	(Norway) Andre Falkenhaug																							21	Ret					0
Pos	Driver	BHI			DON			THR			OUL		CRO			SNE			KNO			ROC		SIL		BHGP			Pen.	Pts
