= 2026 British Touring Car Championship =

69th season of the British Touring Car Championship

The 2026 Kwik Fit British Touring Car Championship (commonly abbreviated as BTCC) was a motor racing championship for production-based touring cars held across England and Scotland. The championship features a mix of professional motor racing teams and privately funded amateur drivers competing in highly modified versions of family cars which are sold to the general public and conform to the technical regulations for the championship. It is the 69th British Touring Car Championship season, and the 16th season for cars conforming to the Next Generation Touring Car (NGTC) technical specification.

This is the second season using 100% renewable fuels, with the hybrid boost having been removed and replaced with turbo boost. While the amount of power boost stayed the same, the weight will be reduced by 55 kg (121 lb). In another change to the 2026 season will introduce qualifying races for all cars on the Saturday afternoon of each race weekend.

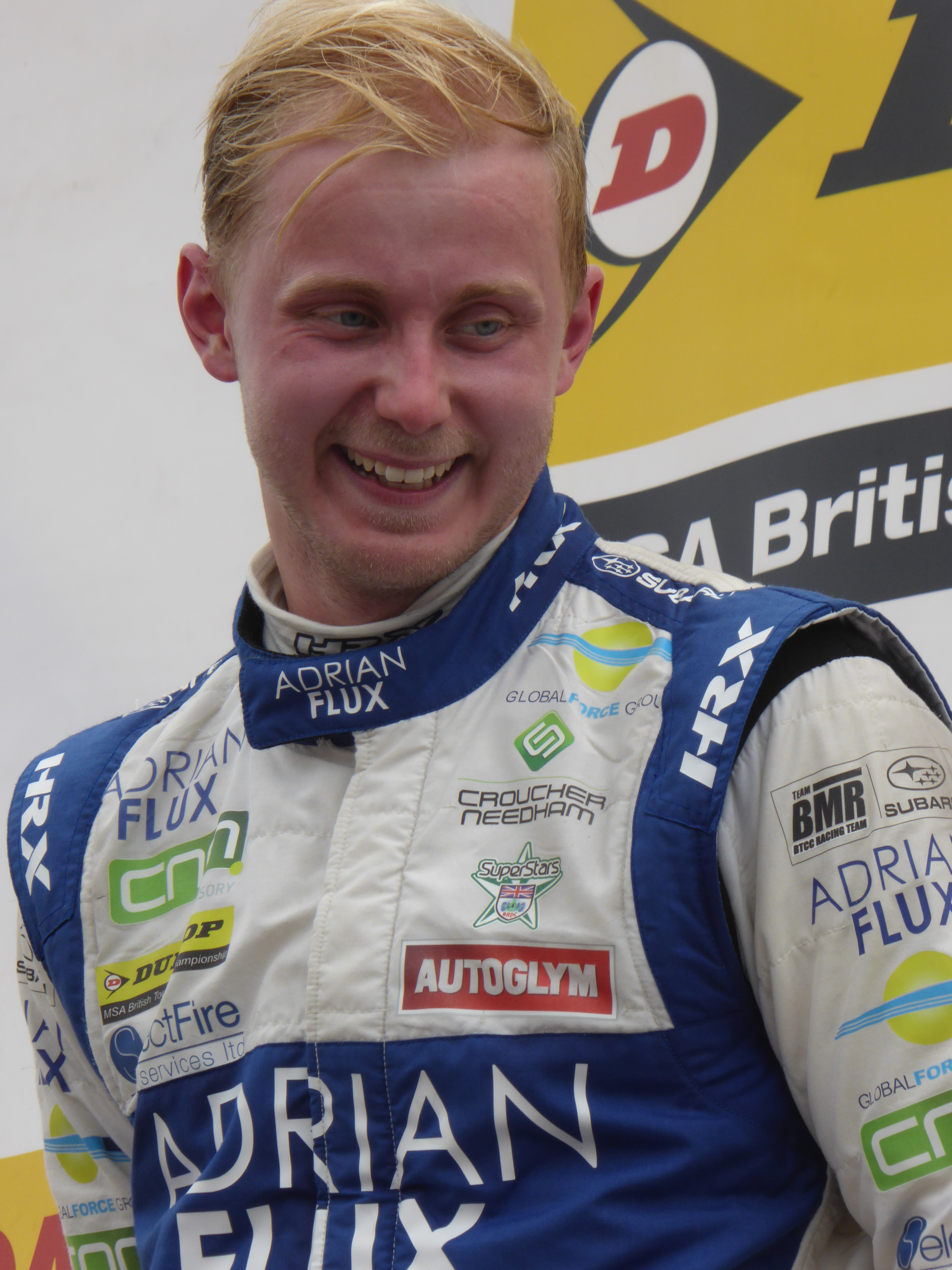
Ashley Sutton won a record-breaking 5th Drivers' Championship, with a total of 516 points.

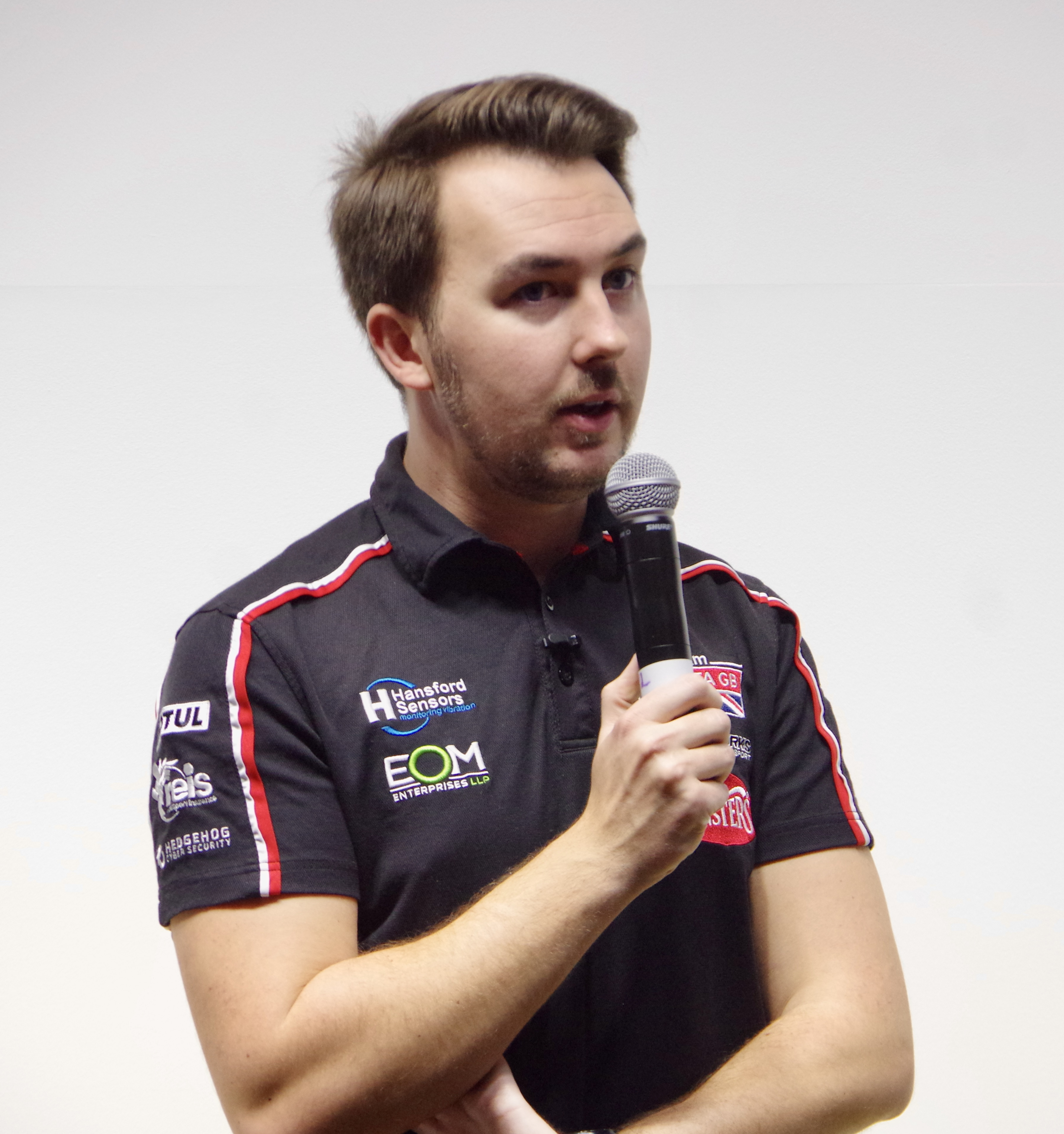
Outgoing champion Tom Ingram finished second in the Drivers' Championship behind rival Sutton, by 129 points.

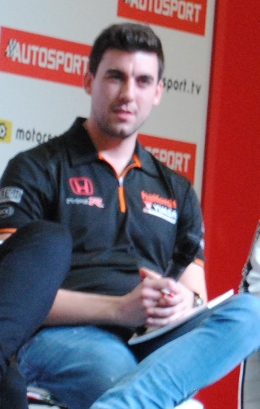
Dan Cammish finished third Drivers' Championship, 144 points behind teammate, Sutton.

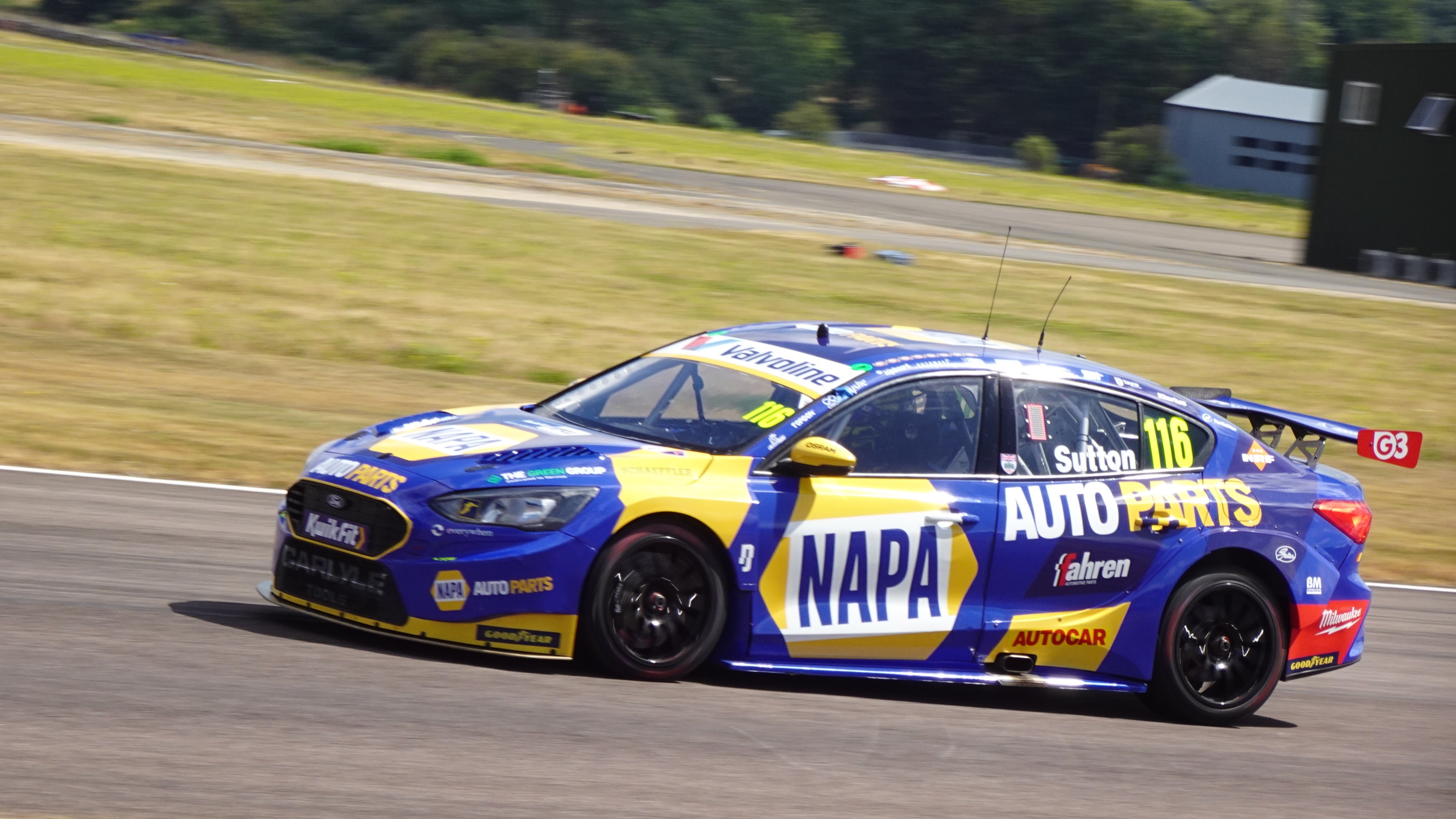
NAPA Racing UK / Ford clinched both the Teams' and Manufacturer's Championships.

== Teams and drivers ==
Team	Car	Engine	No.	Drivers	Rounds
Constructor Entries
Team VERTU	Hyundai i30 Fastback N Performance	Hyundai/Swindon	11	(United Kingdom) Ricky Collard	1–8, 10
Team VERTU	Hyundai i30 Fastback N Performance	Hyundai/Swindon	28	(United Kingdom) Nicolas Hamilton	All
Team VERTU	Hyundai i30 Fastback N Performance	Hyundai/Swindon	80	(United Kingdom) Tom Ingram	All
Team VERTU	Hyundai i30 Fastback N Performance	Hyundai/Swindon	81	(Japan) Osamu Kawashima	9
Team VERTU	Hyundai i30 Fastback N Performance	Hyundai/Swindon	3	(United Kingdom) Tom Chilton	1–8
Team VERTU	Hyundai i30 Fastback N Performance	TOCA/M-Sport	3	(United Kingdom) Tom Chilton	9–10
Speedworks Corolla Racing	Toyota Corolla GR Sport	TOCA/M-Sport	7	(United Kingdom) Ryan Bensley	5–10
Speedworks Corolla Racing	Toyota Corolla GR Sport	TOCA/M-Sport	19	(United Kingdom) Max Buxton	1–4
Speedworks Corolla Racing	Toyota Corolla GR Sport	TOCA/M-Sport	66	(United Kingdom) Josh Cook	All
NAPA Racing UK	Ford Focus Titanium Saloon	Ford/Mountune	15	(United Kingdom) Lewis Selby	All
NAPA Racing UK	Ford Focus Titanium Saloon	Ford/Mountune	18	(United Kingdom) Senna Proctor	5
NAPA Racing UK	Ford Focus Titanium Saloon	Ford/Mountune	27	(United Kingdom) Dan Cammish	All
NAPA Racing UK	Ford Focus Titanium Saloon	Ford/Mountune	77	(United Kingdom) Sam Osborne	All (Note: Sam Osborne was entered into Round 5 at Thruxton, but withdrew due to illness.)
NAPA Racing UK	Ford Focus Titanium Saloon	Ford/Mountune	116	(United Kingdom) Ashley Sutton	All
CPRL (Note: Entered as Cataclean Plato Racing for Rounds 1–6 at Donington Park and CPRL for Rounds 7–10.)	Mercedes-AMG A35 Saloon	TOCA/M-Sport	32	(United Kingdom) Daniel Rowbottom	All
CPRL	Mercedes-AMG A35 Saloon	TOCA/M-Sport	33	(United Kingdom) Adam Morgan	All
Independent Entries
WSR	BMW 330i M Sport LCI	BMW/Neil Brown	2	(Philippines) Daryl De Leon	All
WSR	BMW 330i M Sport LCI	BMW/Neil Brown	29	(United Kingdom) Lewis Gilbert	5–10
WSR	BMW 330i M Sport LCI	BMW/Neil Brown	99	(United Kingdom) Charles Rainford	All
LKQ Euro Car Parts with Power Maxed Racing	Audi S3 Saloon (Note: The car was labelled as an Audi S3 Saloon but entered as an Audi A3 Saloon.)	TOCA/M-Sport	16	(United Kingdom) Aiden Moffat	All
LKQ Euro Car Parts with Power Maxed Racing	Audi S3 Saloon	TOCA/M-Sport	88	(United Kingdom) Mikey Doble	All
Steel Seal with Power Maxed Racing	Audi S3 Saloon	TOCA/M-Sport	17	(United Kingdom) Dexter Patterson	All
Steel Seal with Power Maxed Racing	Audi S3 Saloon	TOCA/M-Sport	55	(United Kingdom) Nick Halstead	6–10
Restart Racing	Hyundai i30 Fastback N Performance	Hyundai/Swindon	22	(United Kingdom) Chris Smiley	All
Restart Racing	Hyundai i30 Fastback N Performance	Hyundai/Swindon	123	(United Kingdom) Daniel Lloyd	7–10
Restart Racing	Hyundai i30 Fastback N Performance	Hyundai/Swindon	132	(United Kingdom) James Dorlin	1–6
Laser Tools Racing with MB Motorsport	Toyota Corolla GR Sport	TOCA/M-Sport	50	(Republic of Ireland) Árón Taylor-Smith	All
Laser Tools Racing with MB Motorsport	Toyota Corolla GR Sport	TOCA/M-Sport	52	(United Kingdom) Gordon Shedden	All

Key
Eligible for the Jack Sears Trophy (Note: Drivers are eligible for the Jack Sears Trophy if they have not scored more than one outright podium and the podium has not been awarded as a result of penalties, or not previously won the Trophy.)

Entering/re-entering BTCC

Lewis Selby made his debut with NAPA Racing UK, after competing with the team in Mini Challenge UK, to replace Daniel Rowbottom.

James Dorlin returned to the BTCC with Restart Racing, after missing the last 3 rounds of 2025, replacing Daniel Lloyd.

Ricky Collard returned to the series with Team VERTU, replacing Senna Proctor, having last raced in 2023 with Toyota Gazoo Racing UK.

Changed teams

Árón Taylor-Smith and Gordon Shedden both moved from Toyota Gazoo Racing to Laser Tools Racing with MB Motorsport.

Aiden Moffat moved from LKQ Euro Car Parts Racing with WSR to LKQ Euro Car Parts with Power Maxed Racing, following the LKQ Euro Car Parts brand.

Daniel Rowbottom and Adam Morgan left NAPA Racing UK and Team VERTU respectively, to join the new Cataclean Plato Racing.

Dexter Patterson left Un-Limited Motorsport after a year and joined Steel Seal with Power Maxed Racing in the Audi.

Nicolas Hamilton moved from Un-Limited Motorsport to Team VERTU in the Draper Tools livery, replacing Adam Morgan.

Leaving BTCC

Jake Hill announced prior to Brands Hatch that he would leave Laser Tools Racing with MB Motorsport and the BTCC entirely.

Senna Proctor left Team VERTU after competing with them in the last 7 rounds of 2025, instead taking up a reserve driver and driver coach role at NAPA Racing UK.

Michael Crees confirmed he would not return after racing the first 2 rounds of 2025 with Team VERTU in the Autobrite Direct with Miller Oils livery.

Nick Halstead left the BTCC after competing with Power Maxed Racing in 2025.

Daniel Lloyd announced he would not compete in the BTCC in 2026, citing sponsor/money reasons, after 2025 campaign with Restart Racing.

Team changes

NAPA Racing UK switched from the Ford Focus ST to the Ford Focus Titanium Saloon, their first car change since being under the NAPA name.

WSR reduced their team from a 4-car line-up to 2 cars for the first 4 rounds of the season, despite acquiring 3 TBLs. This was a consequence of their new British GT plan. The team also entered the season as an independent after they lost their BMW manufacturer backing.

Jason Plato entered 2 Mercedes-AMG A35 Saloon cars for his team, with the support of RML. With Rowbottom having a close connection with Cataclean, the team were named Cataclean Plato Racing, utilising the TOCA/M-Sport engine.

One Motorsport did not return to the series after missing the last half of 2025 as the team had no official statement and did not appear on the entry list.

Power Maxed Racing dropped the Cupra Leon, which they ran for the last 4 rounds of 2025, for the S3-badged Audi A3 Saloon along with returning to a 3-car line-up for the first time since 2023.

Laser Tools Racing with MB Motorsport expanded their field to 2 cars and switched from the WSR BMW 330i to the Speedworks Toyota Corolla GR Sport, as well as becoming an Independent team.

LKQ Euro Car Parts moved from West Surrey Racing to Power Maxed Racing, forming LKQ Euro Car Parts with Power Maxed Racing. Dexter Patterson ran under the Steel Seal with Power Maxed Racing brand.

Un-Limited Motorsport decided to step back in 2026, after 2 years in the BTCC.

Toyota Gazoo Racing removed their main advertisement from Speedworks Motorsport. The team renamed as Speedworks Corolla Racing for the cars of Buxton and Cook.

Mid-season changes

GB3 driver Lewis Gilbert made his debut the British Touring Car Championship by joining WSR from the Thruxton weekend. Also for the Thruxton meeting, Ryan Bensley, who previously competed 1 round of 2025 with Team VERTU, replaced Max Buxton at Speedworks Corolla Racing.

Sam Osborne withdrew from the Thruxton round due to illness, he was replaced by reserve driver Senna Proctor.

Nick Halstead, after retiring in 2025, returned with Power Maxed Racing in a 4th Audi S3 Saloon for the Knockhill round onwards, partnering Dexter Patterson at the Steel Seal entrant.

For the second year running, James Dorlin stepped down after Knockhill, leaving Restart Racing. Dorlin would be replaced by fellow Yorkshireman Daniel Lloyd, who returned after being the previous driver in the car.

Cataclean Plato Racing Ltd., the parent company behind Cataclean Plato Racing, entered administration on 11 August, two days after the Knockhill round. The team is currently searching for a buyer and intends to continue racing at least up to and including round seven at Donington Park while administration proceedings continue. For the Donington Park round onwards, the team will be renamed to CPRL, an abbreviation of the full legal name of Cataclean Plato Racing Limited. Although, the team entered as Cataclean Racing.

Team VERTU reserve driver Osamu Kawashima replaced Ricky Collard for Silverstone, becoming the first Japanese BTCC driver. Team VERTU also replaced the Swindon Powertrains engine for the TOCA/M-Sport engine for Tom Chilton only.

Ricky Collard returned at Team VERTU for the season finale at Brands Hatch, with Osamu Kawashima stepping down.

== Race calendar ==
The 2026 calendar was announced on 2 May 2025.

2026 BTCC Race Locations

Round		Circuit	Date
1	R1	Donington Park (National Circuit, Leicestershire)	18–19 April
1	R2	Donington Park (National Circuit, Leicestershire)	18–19 April
1	R3	Donington Park (National Circuit, Leicestershire)	18–19 April
2	R4	Brands Hatch (Indy Circuit, Kent)	9–10 May
2	R5	Brands Hatch (Indy Circuit, Kent)	9–10 May
2	R6	Brands Hatch (Indy Circuit, Kent)	9–10 May
3	R7	Snetterton Motor Racing Circuit (300 Circuit, Norfolk)	23–24 May
3	R8	Snetterton Motor Racing Circuit (300 Circuit, Norfolk)	23–24 May
3	R9	Snetterton Motor Racing Circuit (300 Circuit, Norfolk)	23–24 May
4	R10	Oulton Park (Island Circuit, Cheshire)	6–7 June
4	R11	Oulton Park (Island Circuit, Cheshire)	6–7 June
4	R12	Oulton Park (Island Circuit, Cheshire)	6–7 June
5	R13	Thruxton Circuit (Hampshire)	25–26 July
5	R14	Thruxton Circuit (Hampshire)	25–26 July
5	R15	Thruxton Circuit (Hampshire)	25–26 July
6	R16	Knockhill Racing Circuit (Fife)	8–9 August
6	R17	Knockhill Racing Circuit (Fife)	8–9 August
6	R18	Knockhill Racing Circuit (Fife)	8–9 August
7	R19	Donington Park (Grand Prix Circuit, Leicestershire)	22–23 August
7	R20	Donington Park (Grand Prix Circuit, Leicestershire)	22–23 August
7	R21	Donington Park (Grand Prix Circuit, Leicestershire)	22–23 August
8	R22	Croft Circuit (North Yorkshire)	5–6 September
8	R23	Croft Circuit (North Yorkshire)	5–6 September
8	R24	Croft Circuit (North Yorkshire)	5–6 September
9	R25	Silverstone Circuit (National Circuit, Northamptonshire)	26–27 September
9	R26	Silverstone Circuit (National Circuit, Northamptonshire)	26–27 September
9	R27	Silverstone Circuit (National Circuit, Northamptonshire)	26–27 September
10	R28	Brands Hatch (Grand Prix Circuit, Kent)	10–11 October
10	R29	Brands Hatch (Grand Prix Circuit, Kent)	10–11 October
10	R30	Brands Hatch (Grand Prix Circuit, Kent)	10–11 October

== Results and standings ==
Round		Circuit	Pole position	Fastest lap	Winning driver	Winning team	Winning independent	Winning JST
1	QR	Donington Park National	(United Kingdom) Tom Ingram	(United Kingdom) Tom Ingram	(United Kingdom) Daniel Rowbottom	(United Kingdom) Cataclean Plato Racing	Points not awarded	
1	R1	Donington Park National	(United Kingdom) Daniel Rowbottom	(United Kingdom) Ashley Sutton	(United Kingdom) Mikey Doble (Note: Tom Ingram originally won the race, but was later disqualified for an overboost infringement. Mikey Doble, initially classified second, thus inherited the win.)	(United Kingdom) LKQ Euro Car Parts with Power Maxed Racing	(United Kingdom) Mikey Doble	(United Kingdom) Dexter Patterson
1	R2	Donington Park National		(United Kingdom) Ashley Sutton	(United Kingdom) Ashley Sutton	(United Kingdom) NAPA Racing UK	(United Kingdom) Gordon Shedden	(United Kingdom) Dexter Patterson
1	R3	Donington Park National		(United Kingdom) Tom Ingram	(United Kingdom) Ashley Sutton	(United Kingdom) NAPA Racing UK	(United Kingdom) Aiden Moffat	(United Kingdom) Dexter Patterson
2	QR	Brands Hatch Indy	(United Kingdom) Tom Ingram	(United Kingdom) Ricky Collard	(United Kingdom) Ashley Sutton	(United Kingdom) NAPA Racing UK	Points not awarded	
2	R1	Brands Hatch Indy	(United Kingdom) Ashley Sutton	(United Kingdom) Ashley Sutton	(United Kingdom) Ashley Sutton	(United Kingdom) NAPA Racing UK	(United Kingdom) Mikey Doble	(United Kingdom) Sam Osborne
2	R2	Brands Hatch Indy		(United Kingdom) Daniel Rowbottom	(Republic of Ireland) Árón Taylor-Smith	(United Kingdom) Laser Tools Racing with MB Motorsport	(Republic of Ireland) Árón Taylor-Smith	(United Kingdom) James Dorlin
2	R3	Brands Hatch Indy		(United Kingdom) Ashley Sutton	(United Kingdom) Tom Ingram	(United Kingdom) Team VERTU	(United Kingdom) Mikey Doble	(United Kingdom) James Dorlin
3	QR	Snetterton Motor Racing Circuit	(United Kingdom) Tom Chilton	(United Kingdom) Charles Rainford	(United Kingdom) Charles Rainford	(United Kingdom) WSR	Points not awarded	
3	R1	Snetterton Motor Racing Circuit	(United Kingdom) Charles Rainford	(United Kingdom) Tom Ingram	(United Kingdom) Charles Rainford	(United Kingdom) WSR	(United Kingdom) Charles Rainford	(United Kingdom) James Dorlin
3	R2	Snetterton Motor Racing Circuit		(United Kingdom) Ashley Sutton	(United Kingdom) Ashley Sutton	(United Kingdom) NAPA Racing UK	(United Kingdom) Gordon Shedden	(United Kingdom) Lewis Selby
3	R3	Snetterton Motor Racing Circuit		(United Kingdom) Charles Rainford	(United Kingdom) Gordon Shedden	(United Kingdom) Laser Tools Racing with MB Motorsport	(United Kingdom) Gordon Shedden	(United Kingdom) Sam Osborne
4	QR	Oulton Park	(Republic of Ireland) Árón Taylor-Smith	(United Kingdom) Josh Cook	(United Kingdom) Dan Cammish	(United Kingdom) NAPA Racing UK	Points not awarded	
4	R1	Oulton Park	(United Kingdom) Dan Cammish	(United Kingdom) Dan Cammish	(United Kingdom) Dan Cammish	(United Kingdom) NAPA Racing UK	(Republic of Ireland) Árón Taylor-Smith	(United Kingdom) Dexter Patterson
4	R2	Oulton Park		(United Kingdom) Ashley Sutton	(United Kingdom) Ashley Sutton	(United Kingdom) NAPA Racing UK	(Philippines) Daryl De Leon	(United Kingdom) Dexter Patterson
4	R3	Oulton Park		(United Kingdom) Tom Ingram	(United Kingdom) Charles Rainford	(United Kingdom) WSR	(United Kingdom) Charles Rainford	(United Kingdom) Dexter Patterson
5	QR	Thruxton Circuit	(United Kingdom) Josh Cook	(United Kingdom) Josh Cook	(United Kingdom) Josh Cook	(United Kingdom) Speedworks Corolla Racing	Points not awarded	
5	R1	Thruxton Circuit	(United Kingdom) Josh Cook	(United Kingdom) Josh Cook	(United Kingdom) Josh Cook	(United Kingdom) Speedworks Corolla Racing	(United Kingdom) Mikey Doble	(United Kingdom) James Dorlin
5	R2	Thruxton Circuit		(United Kingdom) Ashley Sutton	(United Kingdom) Ashley Sutton	(United Kingdom) NAPA Racing UK	(United Kingdom) James Dorlin	(United Kingdom) James Dorlin
5	R3	Thruxton Circuit		(United Kingdom) Tom Ingram	(United Kingdom) Tom Ingram	(United Kingdom) Team VERTU	(United Kingdom) James Dorlin	(United Kingdom) James Dorlin
6	QR	Knockhill Racing Circuit	(United Kingdom) Adam Morgan	(United Kingdom) Adam Morgan	(United Kingdom) Adam Morgan	(United Kingdom) Cataclean Plato Racing	Points not awarded	
6	R1	Knockhill Racing Circuit	(United Kingdom) Adam Morgan	(United Kingdom) Ashley Sutton	(United Kingdom) Adam Morgan	(United Kingdom) Cataclean Plato Racing	(United Kingdom) Gordon Shedden	(United Kingdom) Dexter Patterson
6	R2	Knockhill Racing Circuit		(United Kingdom) Ashley Sutton	(United Kingdom) Ashley Sutton	(United Kingdom) NAPA Racing UK	(United Kingdom) Mikey Doble	(United Kingdom) Dexter Patterson
6	R3	Knockhill Racing Circuit		(United Kingdom) Gordon Shedden	(United Kingdom) Tom Chilton	(United Kingdom) Team VERTU	(United Kingdom) Dexter Patterson	(United Kingdom) Dexter Patterson
7	QR	Donington Park GP	(United Kingdom) Adam Morgan	(United Kingdom) Adam Morgan	(United Kingdom) Adam Morgan	(United Kingdom) Cataclean Racing	Points not awarded	
7	R1	Donington Park GP	(United Kingdom) Adam Morgan	(United Kingdom) Adam Morgan	(United Kingdom) Adam Morgan	(United Kingdom) Cataclean Racing	(United Kingdom) Gordon Shedden	(United Kingdom) Dexter Patterson
7	R2	Donington Park GP		(United Kingdom) Daniel Rowbottom	(United Kingdom) Dan Cammish	(United Kingdom) NAPA Racing UK	(United Kingdom) Dexter Patterson	(United Kingdom) Dexter Patterson
7	R3	Donington Park GP		(United Kingdom) Adam Morgan	(United Kingdom) Adam Morgan	(United Kingdom) Cataclean Racing	(United Kingdom) Aiden Moffat	(United Kingdom) Dexter Patterson
8	QR	Croft Circuit	(United Kingdom) Josh Cook	(United Kingdom) Tom Ingram	(United Kingdom) Josh Cook	(United Kingdom) Speedworks Corolla Racing	Points not awarded	
8	R1	Croft Circuit	(United Kingdom) Josh Cook	(United Kingdom) Josh Cook	(United Kingdom) Josh Cook (Note: Tom Ingram was the first driver to cross the finish line, but received a 5-second time penalty for track limits. Josh Cook, who was the second driver to cross the finish line, thus inherited the win.)	(United Kingdom) Speedworks Corolla Racing	(United Kingdom) Aiden Moffat	(United Kingdom) Lewis Gilbert
8	R2	Croft Circuit		(United Kingdom) Ricky Collard	(United Kingdom) Ashley Sutton	(United Kingdom) NAPA Racing UK	(United Kingdom) Charles Rainford	(United Kingdom) Lewis Gilbert
8	R3	Croft Circuit		(United Kingdom) Ashley Sutton	(United Kingdom) Mikey Doble	(United Kingdom) LKQ Euro Car Parts with Power Maxed Racing	(United Kingdom) Mikey Doble	(United Kingdom) Dexter Patterson
9	QR	Silverstone National	(United Kingdom) Mikey Doble	(United Kingdom) Mikey Doble	(United Kingdom) Mikey Doble	(United Kingdom) LKQ Euro Car Parts with Power Maxed Racing	Points not awarded	
9	R1	Silverstone National	(United Kingdom) Mikey Doble	(United Kingdom) Josh Cook	(United Kingdom) Aiden Moffat	(United Kingdom) LKQ Euro Car Parts with Power Maxed Racing	(United Kingdom) Aiden Moffat	(United Kingdom) Lewis Selby
9	R2	Silverstone National		(United Kingdom) Ashley Sutton	(United Kingdom) Ashley Sutton	(United Kingdom) NAPA Racing UK	(United Kingdom) Charles Rainford	(United Kingdom) Lewis Selby
9	R3	Silverstone National		(United Kingdom) Tom Ingram	(United Kingdom) Tom Ingram	(United Kingdom) Team VERTU	(United Kingdom) Aiden Moffat	(United Kingdom) Sam Osborne
10	QR	Brands Hatch GP	(United Kingdom) Aiden Moffat	(United Kingdom) Aiden Moffat	(United Kingdom) Aiden Moffat	(United Kingdom) LKQ Euro Car Parts with Power Maxed Racing	Points not awarded	
10	R1	Brands Hatch GP	(United Kingdom) Aiden Moffat	(United Kingdom) Josh Cook	(United Kingdom) Tom Ingram	(United Kingdom) Team VERTU	(United Kingdom) Aiden Moffat	(United Kingdom) Dexter Patterson
10	R2	Brands Hatch GP		(United Kingdom) Ashley Sutton	(United Kingdom) Tom Ingram	(United Kingdom) Team VERTU	(United Kingdom) Mikey Doble	(United Kingdom) Dexter Patterson
10	R3	Brands Hatch GP		(United Kingdom) Ashley Sutton	(United Kingdom) Dan Cammish (Note: Ricky Collard originally won the race, but later received a 5-second time penalty for a procedural infringement on a safety car restart. Dan Cammish, initially classified second, thus inherited the win.)	(United Kingdom) NAPA Racing UK	(United Kingdom) Dexter Patterson	(United Kingdom) Dexter Patterson

=== Drivers' Championship ===
Points system
Qualifying Race	**1st**	**2nd**	**3rd**	**4th**	**5th**	**6th**	**7th**	**8th**	**9th**	**10th**	**11th**	**12th**	**13th**	**14th**	**15th**		
Qualifying Race	10	9	8	7	6	5	5	4	4	3	3	2	2	1	1		
Races	**1st**	**2nd**	**3rd**	**4th**	**5th**	**6th**	**7th**	**8th**	**9th**	**10th**	**11th**	**12th**	**13th**	**14th**	**15th**	Fastest lap	Lead laps in race
Races	20	17	15	13	11	10	9	8	7	6	5	4	3	2	1	1	1

Notes

- The point for leading laps in race is one point, regardless of how many laps led.

Pos.	Driver	DPN			BHI			SNE			OUL			THR			KNO			DPGP			CRO			SIL			BHGP			Pts
1	(United Kingdom) Ashley Sutton	2	1*	1*	**1***^{1}	2*	2	10	1*	2	7^{3}	1*	9	2^{3}	1*	2	4^{11}	1*	12	2^{4}	2*	8	2^{3}	1*	Ret	12^{14}	1*	2	5^{11}	3	2	516
2	(United Kingdom) Tom Ingram	DSQ^{2}	Ret	2	3^{5}	4	1*	2^{3}	Ret*	8	3^{4}	2	3	5^{2}	5	1*	5^{9}	Ret	10	9^{8}	3	9	3*^{5}	Ret	Ret	13^{12}	8	1*	1*^{2}	1*	Ret	387
3	(United Kingdom) Dan Cammish	4^{13}	2	10	4^{3}	14	16	5^{4}	4	9	**1***^{1}	3*	4	7^{4}	2	3	18^{10}	9	3	4^{5}	1*	15	4^{2}	4	18	21^{15}	6	5	8^{10}	6	1	372
4	(United Kingdom) Josh Cook	Ret^{3}	10	Ret	10	7	5	4^{2}	12	15	2^{2}	15	5	**1***^{1}	3	Ret	13	15	8	Ret^{3}	15	7	**1***^{1}	Ret	4	4^{6}	10	7	2^{3}	2	6	314
5	(United Kingdom) Adam Morgan	10^{7}	9	8	Ret^{6}	15	6	11^{7}	5	6	Ret^{7}	19	Ret	6^{6}	7	Ret	**1***^{1}	5	2	**1***^{1}	9	1*	15^{12}	15	5	8^{8}	2	10	11	11	5	288
6	(United Kingdom) Mikey Doble	1^{4}	14	19	7^{7}	6	3	14^{14}	13	11	6^{6}	5	11	8^{9}	8	10	8^{7}	4	11	10^{14}	19	11	9	10	1*	**2**^{1}	16	17	6^{4}	4	10	276
7	(United Kingdom) Ricky Collard	Ret^{12}	8	3*	2*^{4}	3*	Ret	8^{12}	2	21	14^{12}	7	2	14	11	4	6^{8}	3	9	8^{11}	5	Ret	5^{7}	3	Ret				3^{5}	7	8*	273
8	(United Kingdom) Daniel Rowbottom	**11**^{1}	Ret	11	15	13	17	6^{5}	6	10	16	12	6	3^{7}	4	11	2^{3}	2*	7	5^{2}	4*	Ret	8^{8}	2	9	10	5	9*	12^{7}	14	Ret	268
9	(United Kingdom) Aiden Moffat	6^{8}	4	4	17	5	10	18	15	14	5^{9}	21	10	15^{13}	22	Ret	9	Ret	22	11^{12}	8	2	6^{6}	9	6	1*^{2}	9*	3*	**4***^{1}	8	4	254
10	(United Kingdom) Charles Rainford	3^{5}	6	5*	9^{15}	Ret	13	**1***^{1}	8*	5	15^{13}	9	1*	17	13	14	21^{5}	6	5	12^{15}	12	5	7^{11}	5	15	7^{7}	3	14	Ret^{12}	16	11	251
11	(United Kingdom) Gordon Shedden	5^{9}	3	14	12^{10}	Ret	7	13^{13}	7	1*	12	6	Ret	22^{8}	10	7	3^{2}	7	23	3^{6}	13	6	13	6	3	6^{10}	12	4	Ret^{14}	Ret	9	249
12	(Philippines) Daryl De Leon	12	5	13	11^{2}	10	4	3^{6}	10	3	10^{15}	4	15	12^{15}	14	12	11^{6}	17	6	15	11	3	20^{4}	13	13	5^{4}	4*	11	7^{6}	5	17	240
13	(United Kingdom) Tom Chilton	9^{6}	13	Ret	5^{14}	Ret	12	7^{8}	3	7	8^{11}	17	Ret	13	12	8	17^{12}	12	1*	20	14	17	11^{13}	8	2	3^{3}	11	6	14^{15}	12	Ret	195
14	(United Kingdom) Dexter Patterson	7^{10}	7	6	Ret^{8}	9	11	16^{11}	19	17	11^{8}	8	8	16^{14}	16	9	7^{13}	8	4	7^{10}	6	10	18	12	8	18^{11}	14	19	9^{9}	9	3	193
15	(Republic of Ireland) Árón Taylor-Smith	8^{11}	11	12	13^{9}	1*	9	19	14	12	4^{5}	18	Ret	10^{11}	9	Ret	12^{14}	13	17	6^{7}	7	4	16^{15}	16	Ret	9^{9}	7	8	Ret^{8}	18	Ret	174
16	(United Kingdom) Chris Smiley	16^{14}	12	7	8^{13}	12	18	15	9	4	9^{10}	11	7*	11^{12}	17	13	16^{4}	Ret	14	16^{13}	10	Ret*	22^{9}	14	11	11	18	13	18^{13}	19	12	127
17	(United Kingdom) Sam Osborne	14	16	9	6^{11}	Ret	14	DSQ^{10}	17	13	13	10	13	WD	WD	WD	10	10	21	DNS^{9}	DNS	14	14	18	Ret	Ret	17	12	15	10	13	76
18	(United Kingdom) James Dorlin	13^{15}	17	15	14	8	8	9^{9}	20	18	17	13	14	9^{10}	6	6	15^{15}	14	15													69
19	(United Kingdom) Lewis Selby	15	15	17	16^{12}	Ret	15	12	11	20	Ret^{14}	14	Ret	18	18	Ret	14	11	13	13	17	12	17^{14}	17	14	15^{13}	13	21	16	13	Ret	46
20	(United Kingdom) Daniel Lloyd																			14	Ret	DNS	12^{10}	7	7	14^{5}	DNS	16	10	17	7	40
21	(United Kingdom) Senna Proctor													4^{5}	15	5																31
22	(United Kingdom) Lewis Gilbert													21	21	16	Ret	Ret	18	Ret	WD	WD	10	11	12	20	20	15	13	15	15	21
23	(United Kingdom) Nicolas Hamilton	17	Ret	18	Ret	11	19	17^{15}	16	16	19	20	12	20	20	15	22	Ret	16	17	18	16	21	19	16	17	15	20	20	21	16	12
24	(United Kingdom) Ryan Bensley													19	19	Ret	19	16	19	18	16	13	19	20	10	16	19	18	17	20	14	11
25	(United Kingdom) Max Buxton	18	Ret	16	18	Ret	Ret	20	18	19	18	16	16																			0
26	(United Kingdom) Nick Halstead																20	18	20	19	20	18	Ret	21	17	19	21	22	19	22	Ret	0
27	(Japan) Osamu Kawashima																									22	22	DNS				0
Pos.	Driver	DPN			BHI			SNE			OUL			THR			KNO			DPGP			CRO			SIL			BHGP			Pts

Colour	Result
Gold	Winner
Silver	Second place
Bronze	Third place
Green	Points classification
Blue	Non-points classification
Blue	Non-classified finish (NC)
Purple	Retired, not classified (Ret)
Red	Did not qualify (DNQ)
Red	Did not pre-qualify (DNPQ)
Black	Disqualified (DSQ)
White	Did not start (DNS)
White	Withdrew (WD)
White	Race cancelled (C)
Blank	Did not practice (DNP)
Blank	Did not arrive (DNA)
Blank	Excluded (EX)

**Bold** – Pole
Italics – Fastest Lap
* – Led Lap

^{Superscript} - Qualifying Race Result

=== Manufacturers'/Constructors' Championship ===
Pos.	Manufacturer	Constructor	Points
1	Ford	Alliance Racing	910
2	Mercedes	CPRL (Note: The team was run as Plato Racing from Rounds 1 to 6 and Cataclean Racing for Round 7.)	676
3	Hyundai	EXCELR8 Motorsport	664
4	Toyota	Speedworks Motorsport (Note: The Speedworks Corolla Racing side was entered as the Constructor.)	582

=== Teams' Championship ===
Pos.	Team	Points
1	NAPA Racing UK	766
2	Team VERTU	540
3	LKQ Euro Car Parts with Power Maxed Racing	483
4	WSR	460
5	Laser Tools Racing with MB Motorsport	392
6	Speedworks Corolla Racing	295
7	Cataclean Plato Racing	282
8	Restart Racing	272
9	CPRL	201
10	Steel Seal with Power Maxed Racing	195

=== Independent Drivers' Championship ===
Pos.	Driver	DPN			BHI			SNE			OUL			THR			KNO			DPGP			CRO			SIL			BHGP			Pts
1	(United Kingdom) Mikey Doble	1	14	19	7	6	3	14	13	11	6	5	11	8	8	10	8	4	11	10	19	11	9	10	1	2	16	17	6	4	10	421
2	(United Kingdom) Aiden Moffat	6	4	4	17	5	10	18	15	14	5	21	10	15	22	Ret	9	Ret	22	11	8	2	6	9	6	1	9	3	4	8	4	382
3	(Philippines) Daryl De Leon	12	5	13	11	10	4	3	10	3	10	4	15	12	14	12	11	17	6	15	11	3	20	13	13	5	4	11	7	5	17	371
4	(United Kingdom) Charles Rainford	3	6	5	9	Ret	13	1	8	5	15	9	1	17	13	14	21	6	5	12	12	5	7	5	15	7	3	14	Ret	16	11	365
5	(United Kingdom) Gordon Shedden	5	3	14	12	Ret	7	13	7	1	12	6	Ret	22	10	7	3	7	23	3	13	6	13	6	3	6	12	4	Ret	Ret	9	361
6	(United Kingdom) Dexter Patterson	7	7	6	Ret	9	11	16	19	17	11	8	8	16	16	9	7	8	4	7	6	10	18	12	8	18	14	19	9	9	3	345
7	(Republic of Ireland) Árón Taylor-Smith	8	11	12	13	1	9	19	14	12	4	18	Ret	10	9	Ret	12	13	17	6	7	4	16	16	Ret	9	7	8	Ret	18	Ret	299
8	(United Kingdom) Chris Smiley	16	12	7	8	12	18	15	9	4	9	11	7	11	17	13	16	Ret	14	16	10	Ret	22	14	11	11	18	13	18	19	12	288
9	(United Kingdom) James Dorlin	13	17	15	14	8	8	9	20	18	17	13	14	9	6	6	15	14	15													199
10	(United Kingdom) Lewis Gilbert													21	21	16	Ret	Ret	18	Ret	WD	WD	10	11	12	20	20	15	13	15	15	112
11	(United Kingdom) Daniel Lloyd																			14	Ret	DNS	12	7	7	14	DNS	16	10	17	7	89
12	(United Kingdom) Nick Halstead																20	18	20	19	20	18	Ret	21	17	19	21	22	19	22	Ret	85
Pos.	Driver	DPN			BHI			SNE			OUL			THR			KNO			DPGP			CRO			SIL			BHGP			Pts

=== Independent Teams' Championship ===
Pos.	Team	Points
1	LKQ Euro Car Parts with Power Maxed Racing	515
2	WSR	469
3	Laser Tools Racing with MB Motorsport	449
4	Restart Racing	399
5	Steel Seal with Power Maxed Racing	394

=== Jack Sears Trophy ===
Pos.	Driver	DPN			BHI			SNE			OUL			THR			KNO			DPGP			CRO			SIL			BHGP			Pts
1	(United Kingdom) Dexter Patterson	7	7	6	Ret	9	11	16	19	17	11	8	8	16	16	9	7	8	4	7	6	10	18	12	8	18	14	19	9	9	3	519
2	(United Kingdom) Lewis Selby	15	15	17	16	Ret	15	12	11	20	Ret	14	Ret	18	18	Ret	14	11	13	13	17	12	17	17	14	15	13	21	16	13	Ret	376
3	(United Kingdom) Sam Osborne	14	16	9	6	Ret	14	DSQ	17	13	13	10	13	WD	WD	WD	10	10	21	DNS	DNS	14	14	18	Ret	Ret	17	13	15	10	13	333
4	(United Kingdom) Nicolas Hamilton	17	Ret	18	Ret	11	19	17	16	16	19	20	12	20	20	15	22	Ret	16	17	18	16	21	19	16	17	15	20	20	21	16	333
5	(United Kingdom) James Dorlin	13	17	15	14	8	8	9	20	18	17	13	14	9	6	6	15	14	15													289
6	(United Kingdom) Ryan Bensley													19	19	Ret	19	16	19	18	16	13	19	20	10	16	19	18	17	20	14	221
7	(United Kingdom) Lewis Gilbert													21	21`	16	Ret	Ret	18	Ret	DNS	DNS	10	11	12	20	20	15	13	15	15	179
8	(United Kingdom) Nick Halstead																20	18	20	19	20	18	Ret	21	17	19	21	22	19	22	Ret	128
9	(United Kingdom) Max Buxton	18	Ret	16	18	Ret	Ret	20	18	19	18	16	16																			106
10	(Japan) Osamu Kawashima																									22	22	DNS				17
Pos.	Driver	DPN			BHI			SNE			OUL			THR			CRO			KNO			DPGP			SIL			BHGP			Pts
