= Daniel Rowbottom =

British racing driver (born 1989)

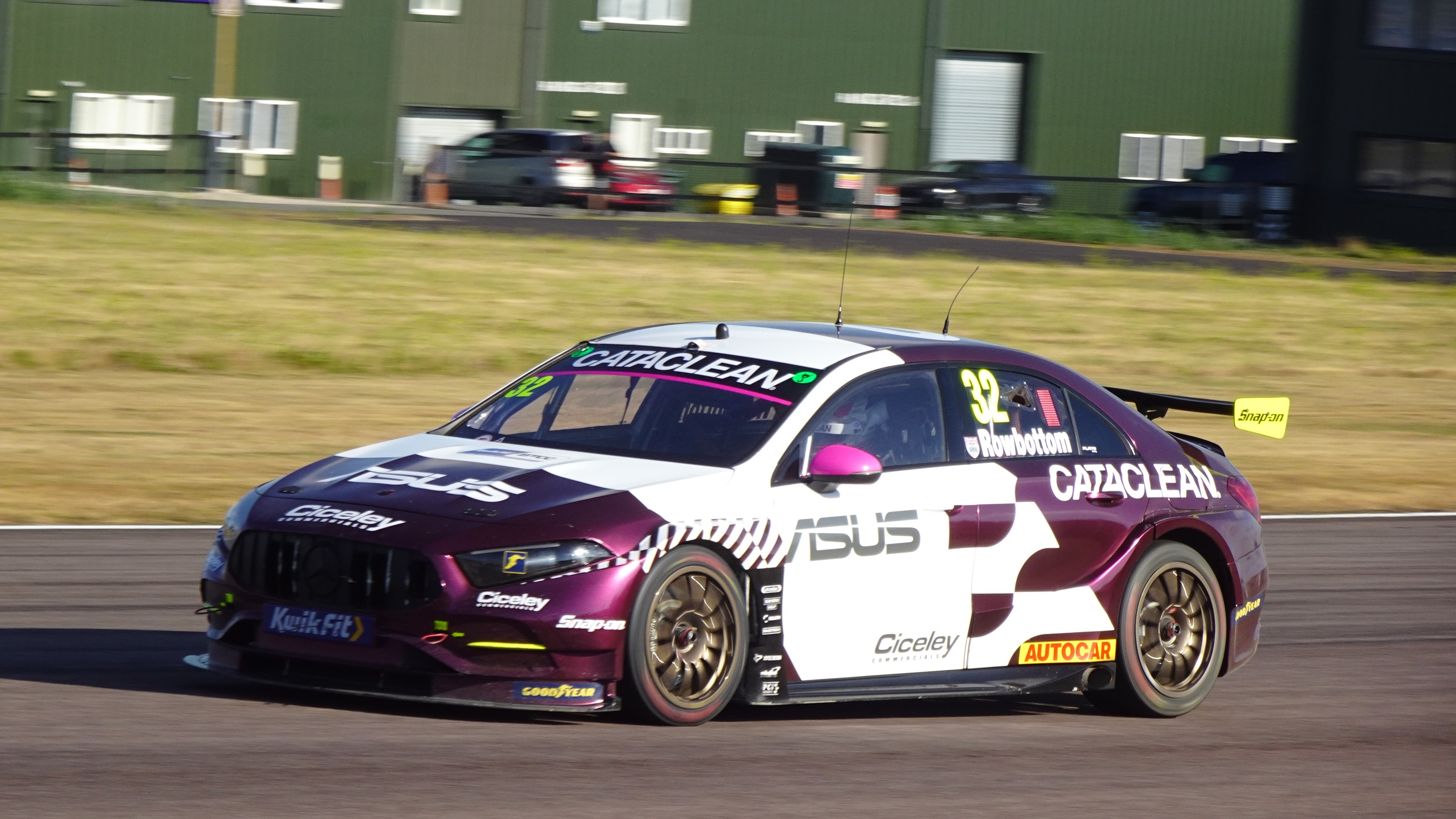
- Rowbottom driving a Plato Racing Mercedes A35 Saloon at Thruxton Circuit in 2026
- Nationality: (United Kingdom) British
- Born: 18 February 1989 (age 37) Kidderminster, Worcestershire, England

British Touring Car Championship career
- Debut season: 2019
- Current team: CPRL
- Car number: 32
- Former teams: Ciceley Motorsport, Team Dynamics, NAPA Racing UK, Plato Racing
- Starts: 209 (210 entries)
- Wins: 5
- Poles: 4
- Fastest laps: 7
- Best finish: 5th in 2025

Previous series
- 2020 2016-2018: NASCAR Whelen Euro Series; Renault Clio Cup United Kingdom

Championship titles
- 2021: Jack Sears Trophy

Daniel Rowbottom (born 18 February 1989) is a British racing driver who competes in the British Touring Car Championship for CPRL. He debuted in 2019, after spending the previous two and a half seasons in Renault Clio Cup United Kingdom.

Rowbottom is a full member of the BRDC. (British Racing Drivers Club).

== Racing record ==
=== Complete British Touring Car Championship results ===
(key) Races in bold indicate pole position (1 point awarded – 2002–2003 all races, 2004–present just in first race) Races in italics indicate fastest lap (1 point awarded all races) * signifies that driver lead race for at least one lap (1 point awarded – 2002 just in feature races, 2003–present all races; ^{Superscript} number indicates points-scoring qualifying race position)

Year	Team	Car	1	2	3	4	5	6	7	8	9	10	11	12	13	14	15	16	17	18	19	20	21	22	23	24	25	26	27	28	29	30	DC	Points
2019	Cataclean Racing with Ciceley Motorsport	Mercedes-Benz A-Class	BRH; 1; 23	BRH; 2 Ret	BRH; 3; 23	DON; 1; 19	DON; 2; 21	DON; 3; 17	THR; 1; 19	THR; 2; 24	THR; 3 Ret	CRO; 1; 20	CRO; 2; 21	CRO; 3; 17	OUL; 1; 21	OUL; 2; 15	OUL; 3; 16	SNE; 1; 15	SNE; 2 Ret	SNE; 3 Ret	THR; 1; 20	THR; 2; 20	THR; 3; 14	KNO; 1; 17	KNO; 2; 23	KNO; 3; 18	SIL; 1; 26	SIL; 2; 17	SIL; 3 Ret	BRH; 1; 18	BRH; 2; 15	BRH; 3 Ret	28th	5
2021	Halfords Racing with Cataclean	Honda Civic Type R	THR; 1; 7	THR; 2; 4	THR; 3; 21	SNE; 1; 13	SNE; 2; 15	SNE; 3; 10	**BRH**; **1**; 3	BRH; 2; 4	BRH; 3; 11	OUL; 1; 1*	**OUL**; **2**; 2	OUL; 3; 6	KNO; 1; 15	KNO; 2; 18	KNO; 3; 10	**THR**; **1**; 6	THR; 2 NC	THR; 3; 16	CRO; 1 Ret	CRO; 2; 16	CRO; 3; 9	SIL; 1; 8	SIL; 2; 6	SIL; 3; 9	DON; 1; 14	DON; 2; 10	DON; 3; 6	BRH; 1; 5	BRH; 2; 5	BRH; 3; 2	9th	222
2022	Halfords Racing with Cataclean	Honda Civic Type R	DON; 1; 9	DON; 2; 12	DON; 3 Ret	BRH; 1; 10	BRH; 2 Ret	BRH; 3; 22	THR; 1; 5	THR; 2; 5	THR; 3; 4	OUL; 1; 9	OUL; 2; 26	OUL; 3; 12	CRO; 1; 3	CRO; 2; 5	CRO; 3 Ret	KNO; 1; 28	KNO; 2; 15	KNO; 3; 13	SNE; 1; 8	SNE; 2; 8	SNE; 3; 10	THR; 1; 7	THR; 2; 7	THR; 3; 6	SIL; 1; 18	SIL; 2; 18	SIL; 3; 18	BRH; 1; 12	BRH; 2; 13	BRH; 3 Ret	12th	151
2023	NAPA Racing UK	Ford Focus ST	**DON**; **1**; 5	DON; 2; 11	DON; 3; 10	BRH; 1 Ret	BRH; 2; 15	BRH; 3; 9	SNE; 1; 7	SNE; 2; 4	SNE; 3; 3*	THR; 1; 24	THR; 2; 11	THR; 3; 1*	OUL; 1 Ret	OUL; 2; 21	OUL; 3; 8	CRO; 1; 3	CRO; 2; 3	CRO; 3; 5	KNO; 1 DNS	KNO; 2; 23	KNO; 3 Ret	DON; 1; 8	DON; 2; 7	DON; 3; 22	SIL; 1; 2	SIL; 2; 10	SIL; 3; 4*	BRH; 1; 7	BRH; 2; 8	BRH; 3; 5	7th	226
2024	NAPA Racing UK	Ford Focus ST	DON; 1 Ret	DON; 2; 10	DON; 3; 8	BRH; 1; 5	BRH; 2; 5	BRH; 3; 6	SNE; 1; 10	SNE; 2; 17	SNE; 3; 19	THR; 1; 7	THR; 2; 4	THR; 3; 17	OUL; 1; 15	OUL; 2; 9	OUL; 3; 6	CRO; 1; 10	CRO; 2; 3	CRO; 3; 8	KNO; 1; 7	KNO; 2; 2	KNO; 3; 6	DON; 1; 14	DON; 2; 6	DON; 3; 13	SIL; 1 Ret	SIL; 2; 13	SIL; 3; 15	BRH; 1; 8	BRH; 2 Ret	BRH; 3; 15	11th	186
2025	NAPA Racing UK	Ford Focus ST	DON; 1; 3	DON; 2; 5	DON; 3; 6	BRH; 1; 18	BRH; 2; 9	**BRH**; **3**; 9*	SNE; 1; 4	SNE; 2; 1*	SNE; 3; 17	THR; 1; 5	THR; 2; 3	THR; 3; 1*	OUL; 1; 14	OUL; 2; 6	OUL; 3; 3	CRO; 1; 4	CRO; 2; 1*	CRO; 3; 15	KNO; 1; 14	KNO; 2; 9	KNO; 3; 6	DON; 1; 3	DON; 2; 12	DON; 3; 3	SIL; 1; 9	SIL; 2 Ret	SIL; 3; 14	BRH; 1; 5	BRH; 2; 5	BRH; 3 DSQ	5th	277
2026	Cataclean Plato Racing	Mercedes-AMG A35 Saloon	**DON**; **1**; 11^{1}	DON; 2 Ret	DON; 3; 11	BRH; 1; 15	BRH; 2; 13	BRH; 3; 17	SNE; 1; 6^{5}	SNE; 2; 6	SNE; 3; 10	OUL; 1; 16	OUL; 2; 12	OUL; 3; 6	THR; 1; 3^{7}	THR; 2; 4	THR; 3; 11	KNO; 1; 2^{3}	KNO; 2; 2*	KNO; 3; 7													8th	268
2026	CPRL	Mercedes-AMG A35 Saloon																			DON; 1; 5^{2}	DON; 2; 4*	DON; 3 Ret	CRO; 1; 8^{8}	CRO; 2; 2	CRO; 3; 9	SIL; 1; 10	SIL; 2; 5	SIL; 3; 9*	BRH; 1; 12^{7}	BRH; 2; 14	BRH; 3 Ret	8th	268

=== NASCAR ===
==== Whelen Euro Series – EuroNASCAR PRO ====
(key) (Bold – Pole position. Italics – Fastest lap. * – Most laps led. ^ – Most positions gained)

NASCAR Whelen Euro Series – EuroNASCAR PRO results
Year	Team	No.	Make	1	2	3	4	5	6	7	8	9	10	NWES	Pts
2020	Hendriks Motorsport	7	Ford	ITA; 17	ITA; 19	BEL	BEL	CRO	CRO	ESP	ESP	ESP	ESP	30th	20

Sporting positions
Preceded by Michael Crees	Jack Sears Trophy; Winner; 2021	Succeeded by Bobby Thompson
