= Adam Morgan (racing driver) =

British racing driver (born 1988)

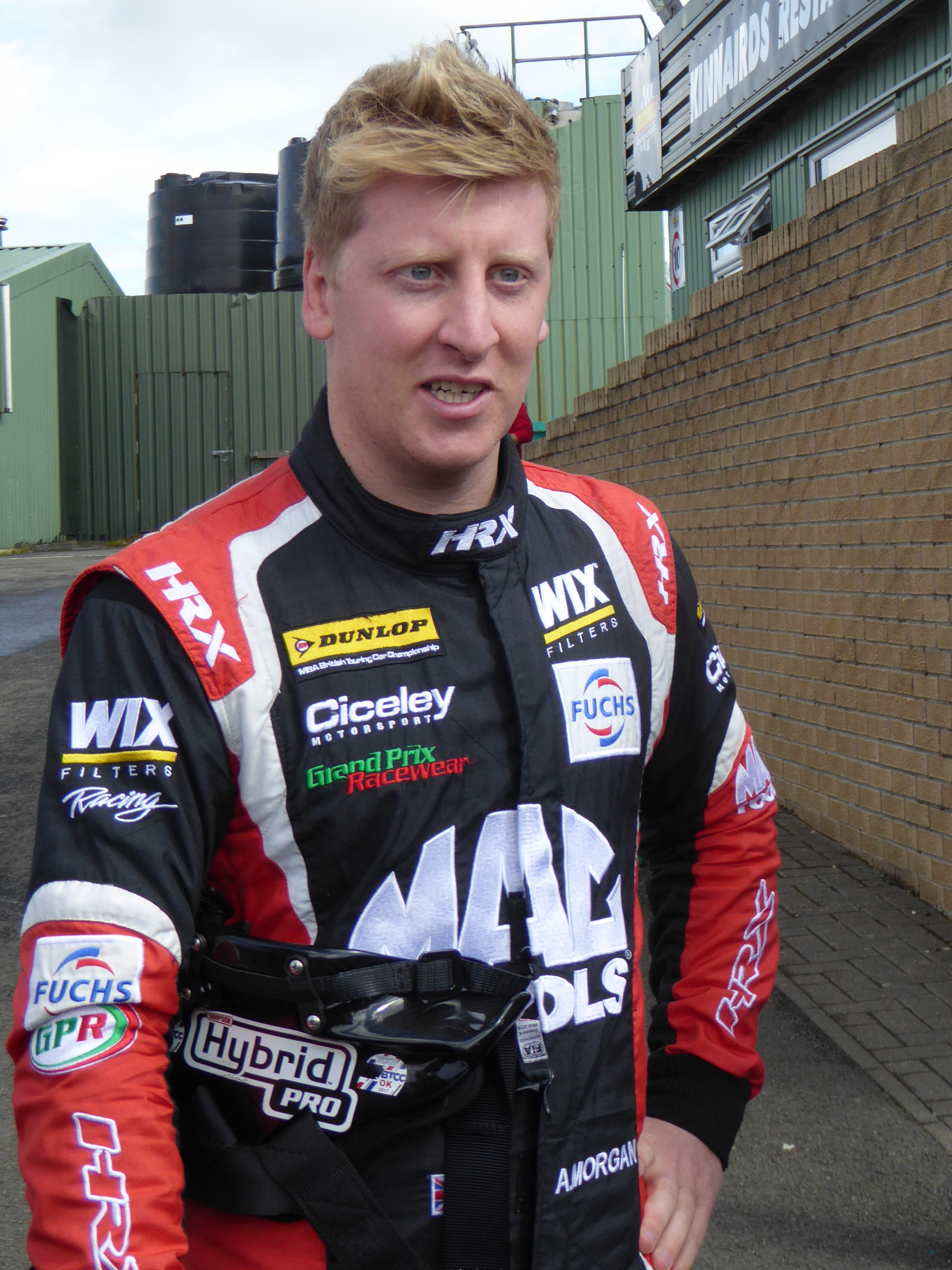
- Morgan at the Knockhill round of the 2017 British Touring Car Championship.
- Nationality: (United Kingdom) British
- Born: Adam William Morgan; 28 October 1988 (age 38) Blackburn, Lancashire, England

British Touring Car Championship career
- Debut season: 2012
- Current team: CPRL
- Car number: 33
- Former teams: Speedworks Motorsport, Ciceley Motorsport, Team BMW, Team VERTU, Cataclean Plato Racing
- Starts: 440 (447 entries)
- Wins: 14
- Poles: 3
- Fastest laps: 16
- Best finish: 5th in 2026

Previous series
- 2018 2011 2009–10 2008 2008 2006 1996–2004: Britcar Endurance; Ginetta GT Supercup; Ginetta G50 Cup; Ginetta G20 Cup; Ma5da Championship; National Historic Rally Championship; Karting

Championship titles
- 2011: Ginetta GT Supercup

Adam William Morgan (born 28 October 1988) is a British racing driver who is currently competing in the British Touring Car Championship for CPRL.

== Career ==
=== Early years ===
Born in Blackburn, Morgan started karting competitively in 1996 at the age of eight. His first road racing experience came in 2006, when he competed in the National Historic Rally Championship driving a Ford Escort Mk1 Mexico. It was a successful campaign, with four wins out of the seven rounds entered, leaving him second in his class.

Morgan moved to circuit racing for 2008, competing in the Ma5da Championship. He also joined the Ginetta G20 Cup for two rounds, taking his first win at Pembrey. He then graduated to the Ginetta G50 Cup for the final two rounds of 2009, taking a best finish of fourth, followed by a full campaign in 2010 that saw him take sixth in the standings.

In 2011, Morgan competed in the inaugural Ginetta GT Supercup season, now driving a G55 car run by his family's Ciceley Racing team. He was crowned champion and earnt a fully-funded drive in the British Touring Car Championship.

=== British Touring Car Championship ===
==== Speedworks Motorsport (2012) ====
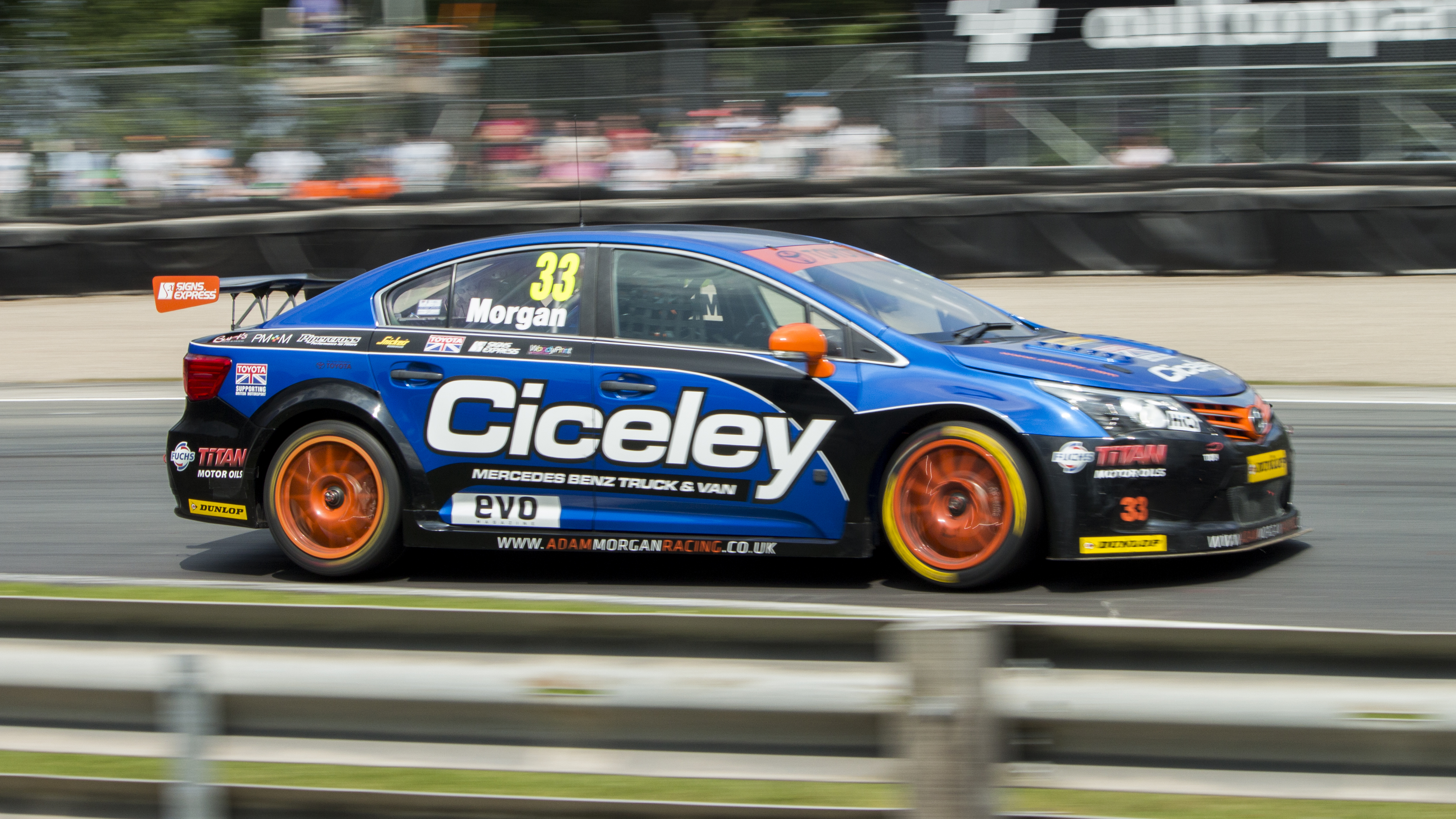
Morgan at Oulton Park in 2013

Morgan used his reward to join Speedworks Motorsport in the 2012 British Touring Car Championship, driving a Toyota Avensis. Morgan matched the pace of test driver James Thompson in his first winter test session. He did not finish any of the races in his first meeting at Brands Hatch; he crashed out of the first race and was unable to start the second race. He was caught up in a multi car pileup in race three after oil was deposited on the track by Mat Jackson's car. He started on pole position for the reversed grid third race at Rockingham but lost the lead on the opening lap in the wet conditions and went on to finish 11th. He took a best finish of 8th in the penultimate round of the season at Silverstone and he finished the season 19th in the drivers' standings.

==== Ciceley Racing (2013–2022) ====
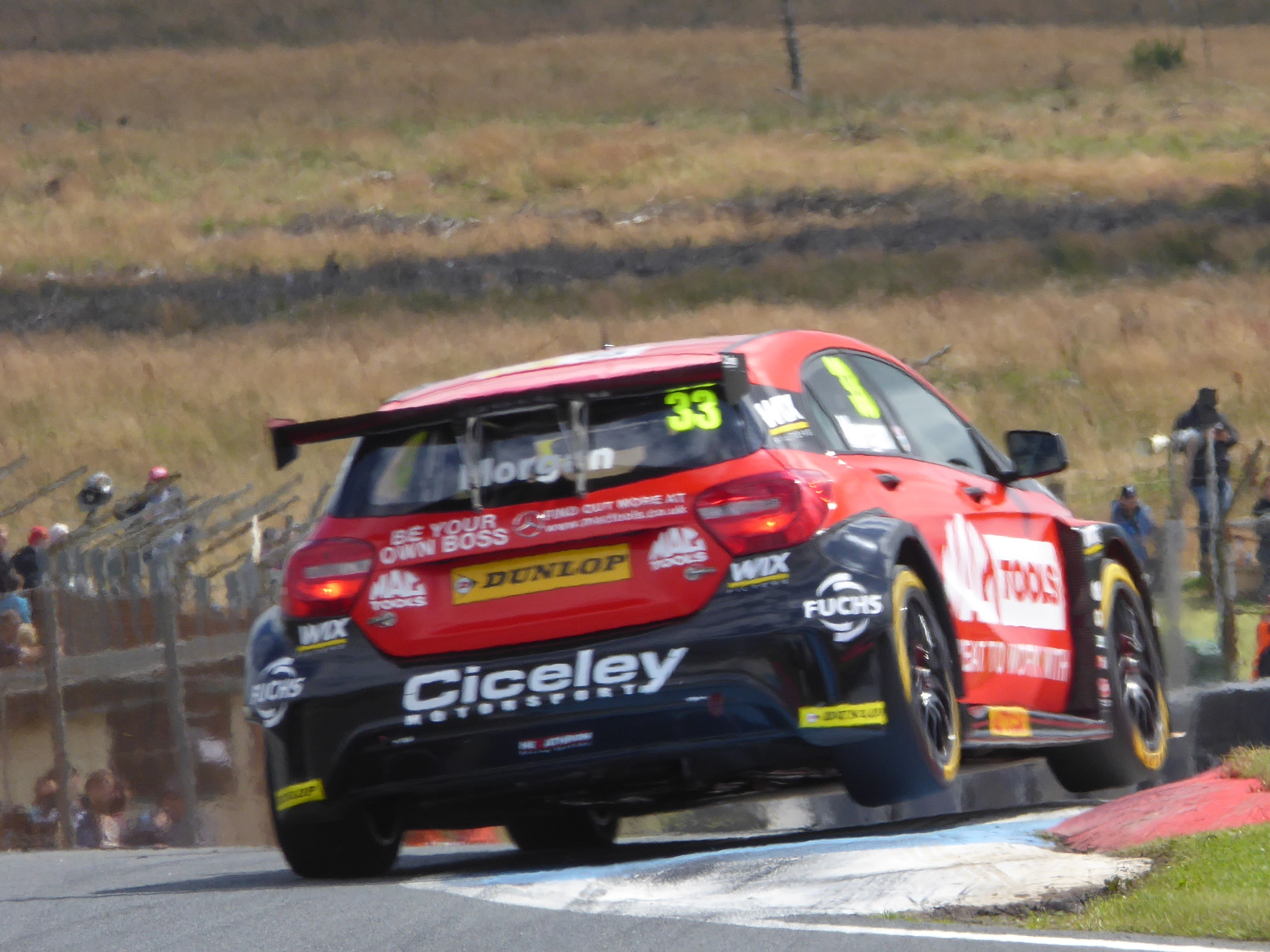
Morgan, at the Knockhill round of the 2017 British Touring Car Championship.

In November 2012, Morgan announced he would be leaving Speedworks Motorsport and would be driving for his family-run Ciceley Racing team in 2013, racing an ex-Dynojet Racing Toyota Avensis. He saw significantly improved results during the season, taking points in every race he finished, including a podium at Oulton Park, to finish seventh in the standings.

In September 2013, Ciceley Racing announced it would build an NGTC Mercedes A-Class for the 2014 season. That year, he took his maiden victory at Brands Hatch, and finished tenth overall.

2015 was the strongest of his early seasons. With a second career win at Thruxton and six additional podiums, he finished seventh in the standings.

In 2016, Morgan began the year with a win during the opening weekend at Brands Hatch, and a second win at Thruxton. He finished ninth in the standings.

Morgan did not take any wins in the 2017 season, but four podiums helped him to finish tenth overall.

In 2018, rebounding from a pair of retirements at Snetterton, Morgan took his maiden pole position at Rockingham, a race he went on to win. With two further victories in Donington Park and Thruxton, he finished seventh in the standings, equalling his career best.

Morgan again took four podiums over the course of the 2019 season, although this was only enough for twelfth in the championship.

2020 would be the final season in which Morgan drove the Mercedes A-Class. His first win of the season came at Oulton Park, where he started second for race three and led every lap before the race was red-flagged with four to go. In the final round at Brands Hatch, he qualified in 17th, but fought through the field to finish 11th in race one and in the top six in races two and three, which meant he finished the season eighth in the standings.

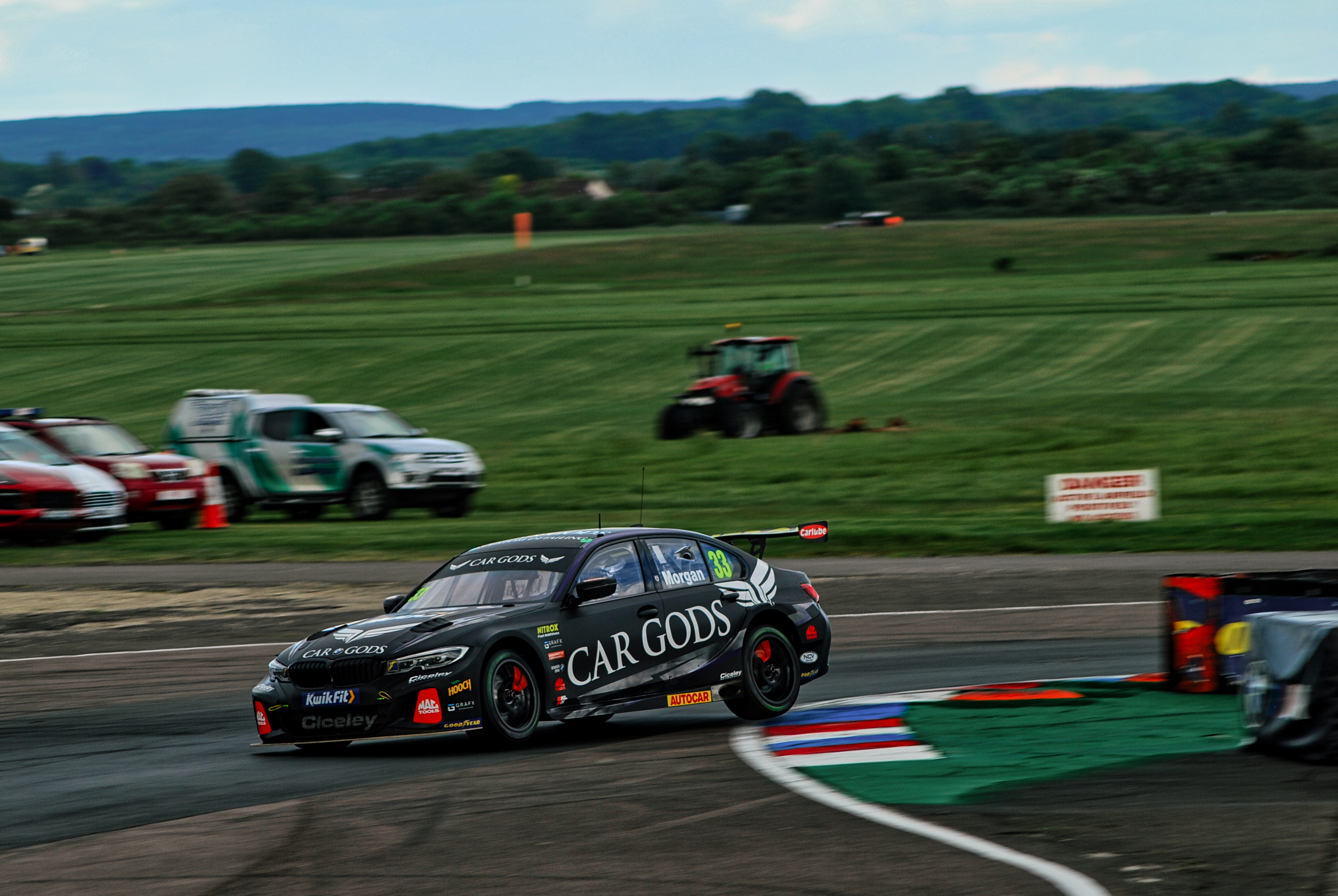
Morgan competing at Thruxton Circuit in 2022

For the 2021 season, Ciceley Racing switched to using a BMW 330i M Sport car. Following a win in race three at Brands Hatch, he took a pair of podiums at Oulton Park, before his second win of the season came at Thruxton Circuit. He started the reverse-grid race three from pole position and led throughout to claim the top spot on the podium, despite an investigation by the stewards for the leaving the track and gaining an advantage.

In 2022, the team switched to the BMW 330e M Sport. Morgan took his first win of the season during the third race at Thruxton, having started from second on the reservse grid. He overtook Jason Plato at the start and lead every lap to finish ahead of Turkington and Ashley Sutton. It was his only win of the year, although a podium at Silverstone helped him to ninth in the standings.

==== Team BMW (2023–2024) ====
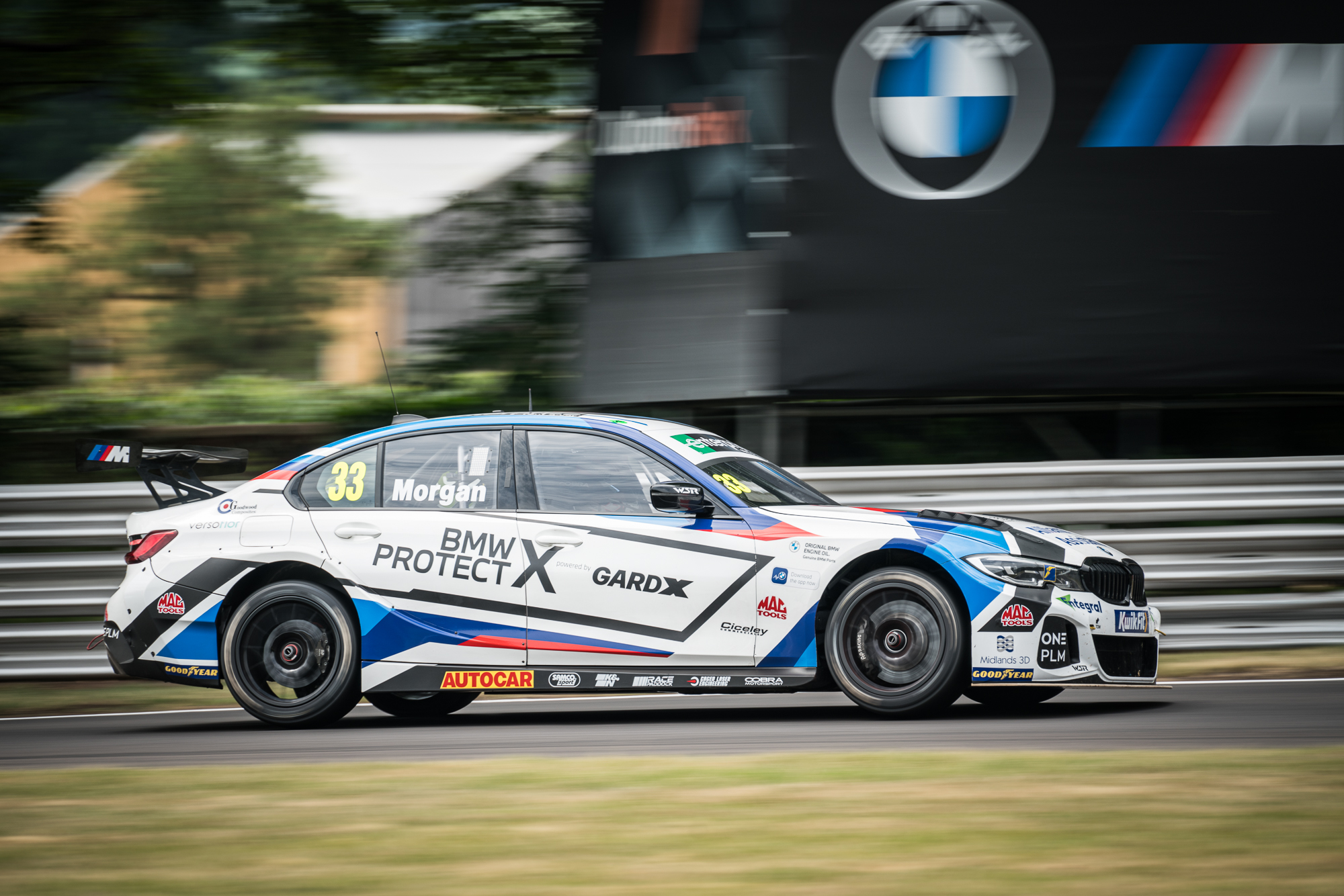
Morgan racing at Oulton Park in 2023

Morgan moved to West Surrey Racing, known as Team BMW, for the 2023 season after Ciceley Motorsport left the championship to focus on historic racing. He continued to drive the BMW 330e M Sport. He finished on the podium in his first weekend with the team, finishing second in race two after making the correct call to switch to wet tyres at the start of the race. A second podium of the season came at Thruxton, where he started race three from pole position but slipped down to second in the second half of the race. With two additional podiums, he finished ninth in the standings.

Morgan continued with the same team and car for 2024. At Brands Hatch, he qualified on the front row for the first time with the new qualifying system behind teammate Turkington. A podium in Knockhill was the highlight of the season though, finishing third in the opening race of the weekend. He finished the season with a top-ten in race three at Brands Hatch, having started last on the grid. He finished eighth overall in the standings and helped BMW win the manufacturers' title.

==== Team VERTU (2025) ====
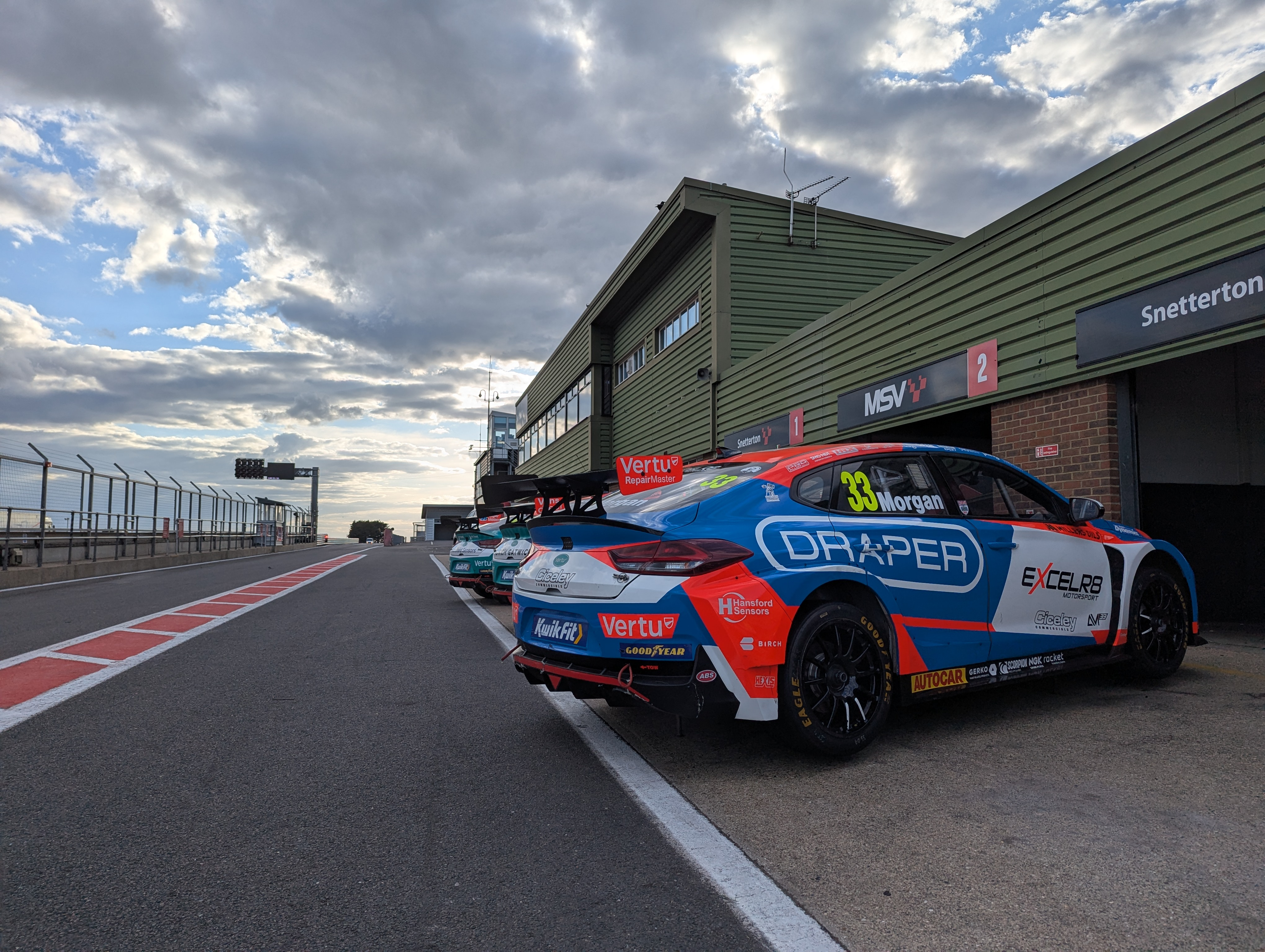
Morgan's car in the pits at Snetterton Circuit in 2025

For the 2025 season, Morgan joined Excelr8 Motorsport, racing under the name Team VERTU, alongside Tom Ingram and Tom Chilton. He drove a Hyundai i30 Fastback N Performance, returning to front-wheel drive machinery for the first time since 2020. After a steady progression of results in round one, Morgan's first podium of the year came at Brands Hatch, where a number of incidents in race two saw him climb to second place. Another podium came at Snetterton, where Morgan finished race two in second place, with Chilton joining him on the podium in third. In round five at Oulton Park, Morgan finished second in race two again ahead of Chilton, his third podium of the season.

==== Cataclean Plato Racing / CPRL (2026) ====
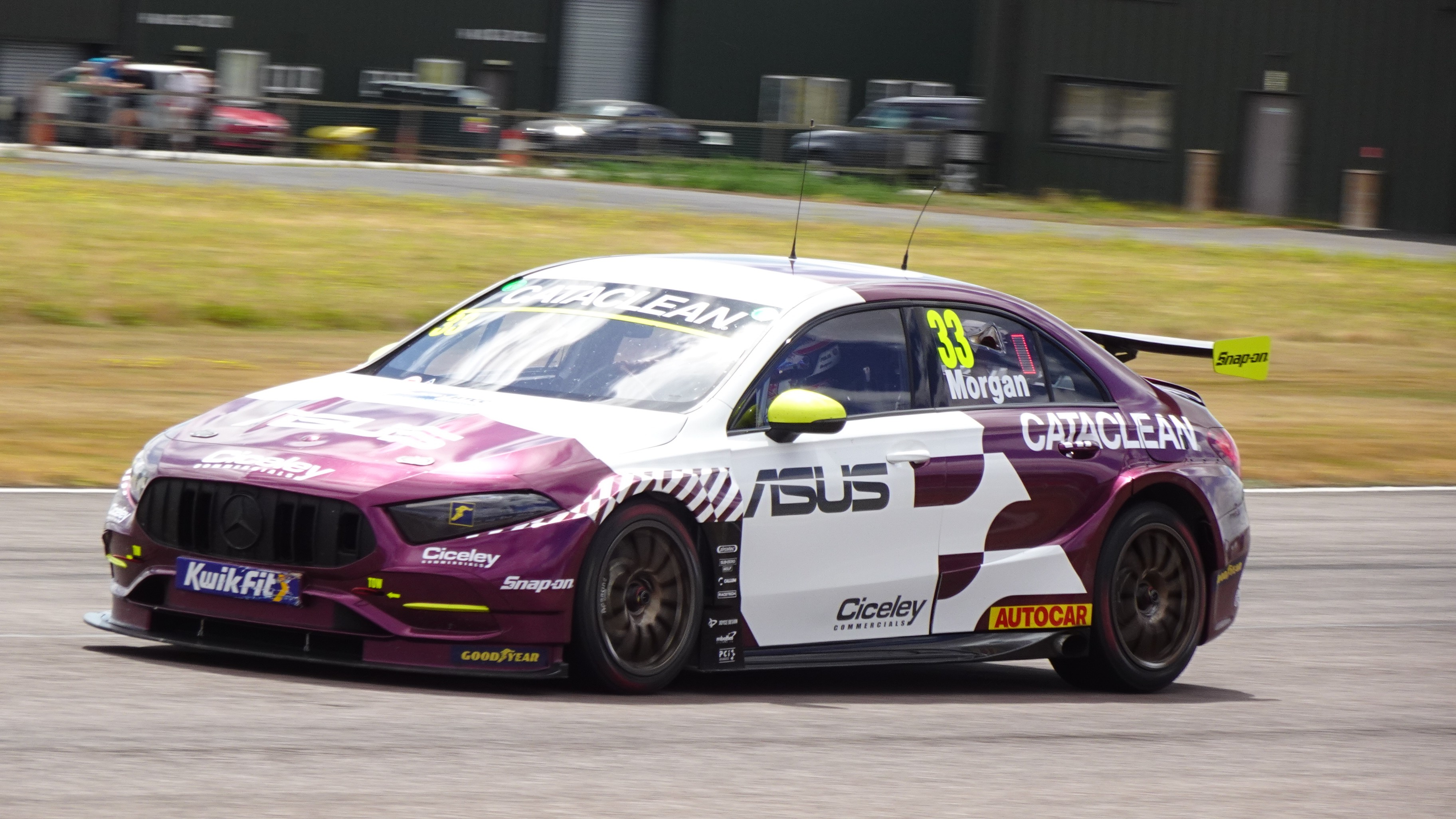
Morgan racing at Thruxton Circuit in 2026

For the 2026 season Morgan joined the newly formed Cataclean Plato Racing driving a Mercedes-AMG A35 Saloon alongside Daniel Rowbottom. Morgan secured the team first and only main race win at Knockhill.

In the week following the Knockhill event Plato Racing entered administration on the 11th August. The team is currently searching for investment to continue operations. On the 18th August it was announced that Morgan would continue to race for the team at the upcoming Donington Park event. The team will race under the new name ""CPRL"".

=== Britcar ===
In 2018, Morgan raced in the Dunlop Endurance Championship with former-BTCC driver Stewart Lines in a Class 4E (Endurance) SEAT Cupra TCR run by Maximum Motorsport. They positioned tenth on the grid in race one at Rockingham, second in Class 4E. They finished 14th in race one, second in class and had the fastest lap in Class 2E. In the Endurance race 2, Lines and Morgan finished in fifth, second in Class 4E, and set the fastest lap again. In round two at Silverstone, the SEAT placed 16th on the grid for race one, second in Class 4E again. In race one, they finished 13th, second in Class 4E. In the Endurance race at Silverstone, the SEAT duo finished third in the race, first in Class 4E for the first time, setting the fastest lap once again.

=== Touring cars ===
In 2019, Morgan competed in the China Touring Car Championship. He finished thirteenth in the standings. He also joined the 2019 Touring Car Trophy for the final round, winning the first race and taking second place (and a class win) in race two, which he started from pole position.

== Racing record ==
=== Complete British Touring Car Championship results ===
(key) (Races in bold indicate pole position – 1 point awarded in first race; races in italics indicate fastest lap – 1 point awarded all races; * signifies that driver lead race for at least one lap – 1 point given; ^{Superscript} number indicates points-scoring qualifying race position)

Year	Team	Car	1	2	3	4	5	6	7	8	9	10	11	12	13	14	15	16	17	18	19	20	21	22	23	24	25	26	27	28	29	30	DC	Points
2012	Speedworks Motorsport	Toyota Avensis	BRH; 1 Ret	BRH; 2 DNS	BRH; 3 Ret	DON; 1; 15	DON; 2; 13	DON; 3 Ret	THR; 1 Ret	THR; 2 NC	THR; 3 Ret	OUL; 1 Ret	OUL; 2 Ret	OUL; 3 Ret	CRO; 1; 15	CRO; 2; 20	CRO; 3; 14	SNE; 1 Ret	SNE; 2 Ret	SNE; 3; 10	KNO; 1; 10	KNO; 2 Ret	KNO; 3; 11	ROC; 1 NC	ROC; 2; 9	**ROC**; **3**; 11	SIL; 1; 16	SIL; 2; 14	SIL; 3; 8	BRH; 1; 12	BRH; 2 Ret	BRH; 3 DNS	19th	50
2013	Ciceley Racing	Toyota Avensis	BRH; 1; 7	BRH; 2; 6	BRH; 3; 4	DON; 1; 5	DON; 2; 5	DON; 3; 5	THR; 1; 10	THR; 2; 8	THR; 3; 12*	OUL; 1; 9	OUL; 2; 7	OUL; 3; 3	CRO; 1; 11	CRO; 2; 8	**CRO**; **3** Ret	SNE; 1; 7	SNE; 2; 5	SNE; 3; 4	KNO; 1; 5	KNO; 2 Ret	KNO; 3; 9	ROC; 1 Ret	ROC; 2; 11	ROC; 3; 11	SIL; 1; 7	SIL; 2 Ret	SIL; 3; 8	BRH; 1; 8	BRH; 2; 8	BRH; 3; 7	7th	233
2014	WIX Racing	Mercedes-Benz A-Class	BRH; 1; 13	BRH; 2; 7	BRH; 3; 10	DON; 1; 16	DON; 2; 14	DON; 3; 10	THR; 1; 9	THR; 2; 8	THR; 3; 8	OUL; 1; 18	OUL; 2 Ret	OUL; 3; 17	CRO; 1 Ret	CRO; 2; 11	CRO; 3; 5	SNE; 1; 4	SNE; 2; 5	SNE; 3; 8	KNO; 1; 6	KNO; 2; 6	KNO; 3; 7	ROC; 1; 5	ROC; 2 Ret	ROC; 3 Ret	SIL; 1 Ret	SIL; 2; 15	SIL; 3; 7	BRH; 1; 5	BRH; 2; 1*	BRH; 3; 11	10th	183
2015	WIX Racing	Mercedes-Benz A-Class	BRH; 1; 11	BRH; 2; 4	BRH; 3; 7	DON; 1; 9	DON; 2; 3	DON; 3; 12	THR; 1; 3	THR; 2; 8	**THR**; **3**; 1*	OUL; 1; 11	OUL; 2; 6	**OUL**; **3**; 17*	CRO; 1; 9	CRO; 2; 9	CRO; 3; 23	SNE; 1; 7	SNE; 2; 2	SNE; 3; 13	KNO; 1; 9	KNO; 2; 10	**KNO**; **3**; 2*	ROC; 1; 9	ROC; 2; 4	ROC; 3; 18	SIL; 1; 12	SIL; 2; 11	SIL; 3; 8	BRH; 1; 3	BRH; 2; 3	BRH; 3; 6	7th	267
2016	WIX Racing	Mercedes-Benz A-Class	BRH; 1; 9	BRH; 2; 8	BRH; 3; 1*	DON; 1; 13	DON; 2; 11	DON; 3 Ret	THR; 1; 1*	**THR**; **2**; 3*	THR; 3; 3	OUL; 1; 24	OUL; 2; 12	OUL; 3; 10	CRO; 1 Ret	CRO; 2 Ret	CRO; 3; 14	SNE; 1; 4	SNE; 2; 5	SNE; 3; 7	KNO; 1; 22	KNO; 2; 11	KNO; 3; 6	ROC; 1; 13	ROC; 2; 8	ROC; 3; 7	SIL; 1; 4	SIL; 2; 2	SIL; 3; 23	BRH; 1; 6	BRH; 2; 8	BRH; 3; 4	9th	241
2017	Ciceley Motorsport with MAC Tools	Mercedes-Benz A-Class	BRH; 1; 3	BRH; 2; 4	BRH; 3; 5	DON; 1; 8	DON; 2; 11	DON; 3; 2	THR; 1; 5	THR; 2; 7	THR; 3; 9	OUL; 1; 28	OUL; 2 DNS	OUL; 3 DNS	CRO; 1 Ret	CRO; 2; 15	CRO; 3; 12	SNE; 1 Ret	SNE; 2; 19	SNE; 3 Ret	KNO; 1; 8	KNO; 2 Ret	KNO; 3; 17	ROC; 1; 8	ROC; 2; 6	ROC; 3; 2	SIL; 1; 3	SIL; 2; 6	SIL; 3; 6	BRH; 1 Ret	BRH; 2; 19	BRH; 3; 9	10th	187
2018	Mac Tools with Ciceley Motorsport	Mercedes-Benz A-Class	BRH; 1; 6	BRH; 2; 13	BRH; 3; 2	DON; 1; 23	DON; 2; 5	DON; 3; 1*	THR; 1; 14	THR; 2; 7	**THR**; **3**; 1*	OUL; 1; 18	OUL; 2; 11	OUL; 3; 5	CRO; 1 Ret	CRO; 2; 19	CRO; 3; 12	SNE; 1; 10	SNE; 2 Ret	SNE; 3 Ret	**ROC**; **1**; 1*	**ROC**; **2**; 2	ROC; 3; 8	KNO; 1; 9	KNO; 2; 5	KNO; 3; 4	SIL; 1; 6	SIL; 2; 2	SIL; 3; 17	BRH; 1; 19	BRH; 2 Ret	BRH; 3; 11	7th	232
2019	Mac Tools with Ciceley Motorsport	Mercedes-Benz A-Class	BRH; 1; 5	BRH; 2; 3	BRH; 3; 11	DON; 1 Ret	DON; 2; 12	DON; 3; 8	THR; 1; 17	THR; 2; 13	THR; 3 Ret	CRO; 1; 16	CRO; 2; 11	CRO; 3; 9	OUL; 1 Ret	OUL; 2; 19	OUL; 3; 10	SNE; 1 Ret	SNE; 2; 18	SNE; 3 Ret	THR; 1; 3	THR; 2; 2	THR; 3; 4	KNO; 1; 9	KNO; 2; 7	KNO; 3; 3	SIL; 1; 8	SIL; 2 Ret	SIL; 3 Ret	BRH; 1; 19	BRH; 2; 26	BRH; 3; 9	12th	155
2020	Carlube TripleR Racing with Mac Tools	Mercedes-Benz A-Class	DON; 1; 12	DON; 2; 8	DON; 3; 4	BRH; 1; 11	BRH; 2; 6	BRH; 3 Ret	OUL; 1; 7	OUL; 2; 9	OUL; 3; 1*	KNO; 1; 12	KNO; 2; 14	KNO; 3; 14	THR; 1; 4	THR; 2 Ret	THR; 3 Ret	SIL; 1; 6	SIL; 2; 3	SIL; 3; 5	CRO; 1; 9	CRO; 2; 13	CRO; 3; 13	SNE; 1; 7	SNE; 2; 9	SNE; 3; 2	BRH; 1; 11	BRH; 2; 6	BRH; 3; 5				8th	206
2021	Car Gods with Ciceley Motorsport	BMW 330i M Sport	THR; 1; 8	THR; 2; 21	THR; 3; 18	SNE; 1; 6	SNE; 2; 8	SNE; 3; 8	BRH; 1; 17	BRH; 2; 12	**BRH**; **3**; 1*	OUL; 1; 3	OUL; 2; 3	OUL; 3; 5	KNO; 1; 13	KNO; 2; 16	KNO; 3; 13	THR; 1; 7	THR; 2; 8	**THR**; **3**; 1*	CRO; 1; 8	CRO; 2; 9	CRO; 3; 17	SIL; 1 Ret	SIL; 2; 17	SIL; 3; 16	DON; 1 Ret	DON; 2 DNS	DON; 3; 25	BRH; 1; 14	BRH; 2 Ret	BRH; 3; 16	13th	161
2022	Car Gods with Ciceley Motorsport	BMW 330e M Sport	DON; 1; 5	DON; 2; 4	DON; 3; 6	BRH; 1; 6	BRH; 2 DNS	BRH; 3; 14	THR; 1; 7	THR; 2; 6	THR; 3; 1*	OUL; 1 Ret	OUL; 2; 16	OUL; 3; 8	CRO; 1; 19	CRO; 2; 15	CRO; 3; 10	KNO; 1; 14	KNO; 2; 18	KNO; 3; 11	SNE; 1; 4	SNE; 2; 4	SNE; 3; 8	THR; 1; 12	THR; 2; 14	THR; 3 Ret	SIL; 1; 3	SIL; 2; 6	SIL; 3 Ret	BRH; 1; 6	BRH; 2; 6	BRH; 3 Ret	9th	193
2023	Team BMW	BMW 330e M Sport	DON; 1; 7	DON; 2; 2	DON; 3; 22	BRH; 1 Ret	BRH; 2; 16	BRH; 3; 6	SNE; 1; 5	SNE; 2; 5	SNE; 3; 9	THR; 1; 13	THR; 2; 12	**THR**; **3**; 2*	OUL; 1; 8	OUL; 2; 7	**OUL**; **3**; 3*	CRO; 1; 19	CRO; 2; 13	CRO; 3 Ret	KNO; 1; 16	KNO; 2 NC	KNO; 3; 18	DON; 1; 12	DON; 2; 9	DON; 3; 3	SIL; 1; 4	SIL; 2; 5	SIL; 3; 10	BRH; 1; 10	BRH; 2; 13	BRH; 3; 8	9th	199
2024	Team BMW	BMW 330e M Sport	DON; 1; 14	DON; 2; 7	DON; 3; 7*	BRH; 1; 15	BRH; 2; 4	BRH; 3; 10	SNE; 1; 7	SNE; 2; 18	SNE; 3; 11	THR; 1; 8	THR; 2; 8	**THR**; **3**; 4*	OUL; 1; 4	OUL; 2; 17	OUL; 3; 7	CRO; 1; 13	CRO; 2; 17	CRO; 3; 9	KNO; 1; 3	KNO; 2; 6	KNO; 3 Ret	DON; 1; 6	DON; 2; 5	DON; 3; 8	SIL; 1; 11	SIL; 2; 7	SIL; 3; 6	BRH; 1 Ret	BRH; 2 DNS	BRH; 3; 10	8th	201
2025	Team VERTU	Hyundai i30 Fastback N Performance	DON; 1 Ret	DON; 2; 10	DON; 3; 5	BRH; 1; 4	BRH; 2; 2	BRH; 3; 12	SNE; 1; 6	SNE; 2; 2	SNE; 3; 15	THR; 1; 8	THR; 2; 12	THR; 3 Ret	OUL; 1; 6	OUL; 2; 2	OUL; 3; 15	CRO; 1; 10	CRO; 2; 4	CRO; 3; 5	KNO; 1; 11	KNO; 2; 10	KNO; 3; 7	DON; 1; 7	DON; 2; 2	DON; 3; 20	SIL; 1; 10	SIL; 2 Ret	SIL; 3; 7	BRH; 1; 3	BRH; 2; 10	BRH; 3; 7	6th	241
2026	Cataclean Plato Racing	Mercedes-AMG A35 Saloon	DON; 1; 10^{7}	DON; 2; 9	DON; 3; 8	BRH; 1 Ret^{6}	BRH; 2; 15	BRH; 3; 6	SNE; 1; 11^{7}	SNE; 2; 5	SNE; 3; 6	OUL; 1 Ret^{7}	OUL; 2; 19	OUL; 3 Ret	THR; 1; 6^{6}	THR; 2; 7	THR; 3 Ret	**KNO**; **1**; 1*^{1}	**KNO**; **2**; 5	KNO; 3; 2													5th	288
2026	CPRL	Mercedes-AMG A35 Saloon																			**DON**; **1**; 1*^{1}	**DON**; **2**; 9	DON; 3; 1*	CRO; 1; 15^{12}	CRO; 2; 15	CRO; 3; 5	SIL; 1; 8^{8}	SIL; 2; 2	SIL; 3; 10	BRH; 1; 11	BRH; 2; 11	BRH; 3; 5	5th	288

=== Complete Britcar results ===
(key) (Races in bold indicate pole position in class – 1 point awarded just in first race; races in italics indicate fastest lap in class – 1 point awarded all races;-

Year	Team	Car	Class	1	2	3	4	5	6	7	8	9	10	11	12	13	14	DC	CP	Points
2018	Maximum Motorsport	SEAT León TCR	E4	ROC; 1; 14	ROC; 2; 5	SIL; 1; 13	SIL; 2; 3	OUL; 1	OUL; 2	DON; 1	DON; 2	SNE; 1	SNE; 2	SIL; 1	SIL; 2	BRH; 1	BRH; 2	5th	2nd	180

=== Complete British GT Championship results ===
(key) (Races in bold indicate pole position) (Races in italics indicate fastest lap)

Year	Team	Car	Class	1	2	3	4	5	6	7	8	9	DC	Points
2018	Ciceley Motorsport	Mercedes-AMG GT4	GT4	OUL; 1	OUL; 2	ROC; 1	SNE; 1	SNE; 2	SIL; 1	SPA; 1	BRH; 1	DON; 1; 27	NC	0

=== Complete TCR UK/Touring Car Trophy results ===
(key) (Races in bold indicate pole position – 1 point awarded just in first race; races in italics indicate fastest lap – 1 point awarded all races; * signifies that driver led race for at least one lap – 1 point given all races)

Year	Team	Car	1	2	3	4	5	6	7	8	9	10	DC	TU	Pts	TCR Pts
2019	Ciceley Motorsport	SEAT Leon TCR	OUL; 1	OUL; 2	DON; 1	DON; 2	CRO; 1	CRO; 2	BHI; 1	BHI; 2	DON; 1; 1	**DON**; **2**; 2	9th	6th	84	43

Sporting positions
Preceded by Frank Wrathall (G50 Cup)	Ginetta GT Supercup; Champion; 2011	Succeeded by Carl Breeze
