= Lewis Gilbert (racing driver) =

British racing driver (born 2004)

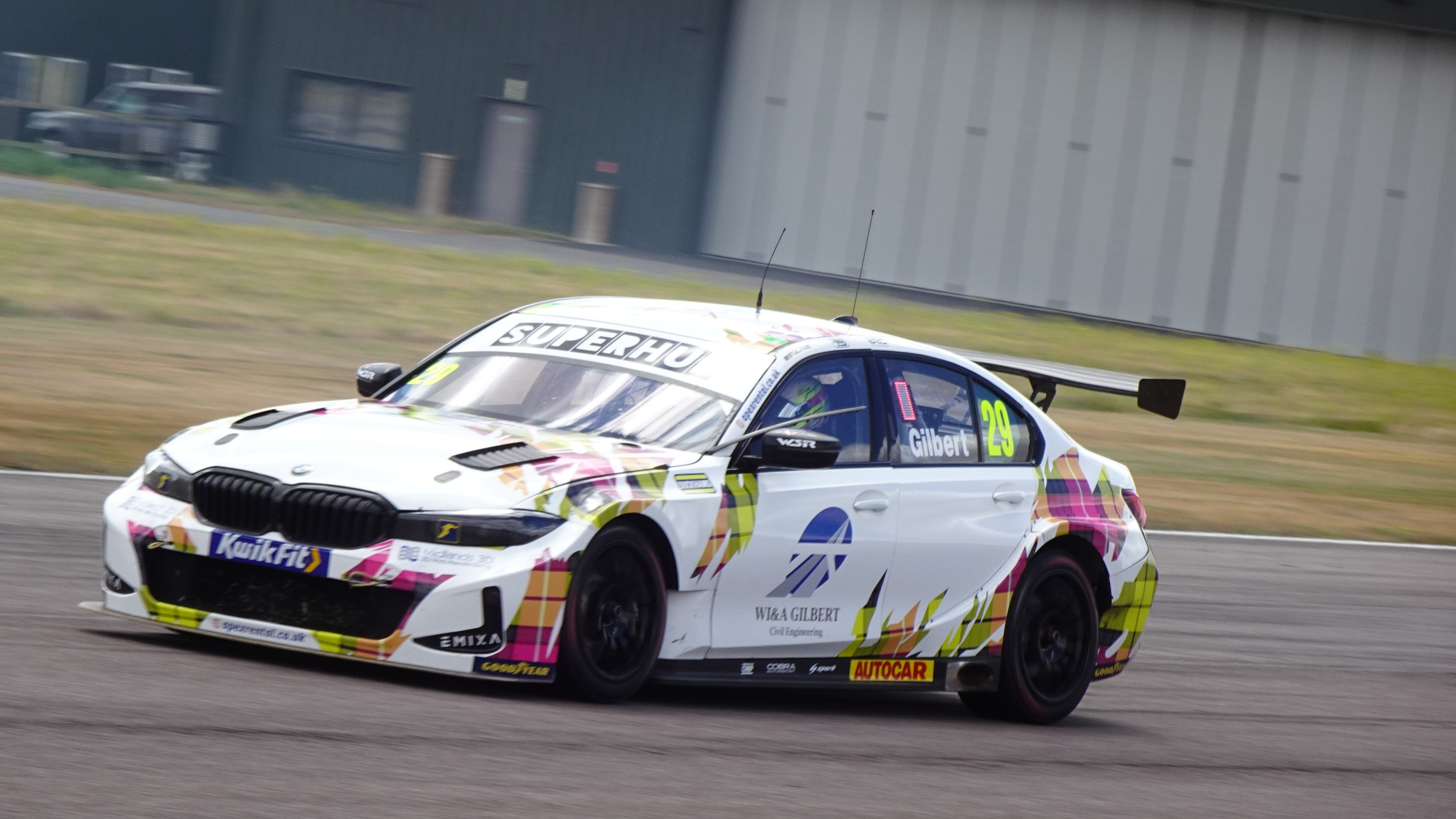
- Gilbert in 2026
- Nationality: (United Kingdom) British
- Born: 24 June 2004 (age 22) Dalry, North Ayrshire, Scotland

British Touring Car Championship career
- Debut season: 2026
- Current team: WSR
- Car number: 29
- Starts: 16
- Wins: 0
- Podiums: 0
- Poles: 0
- Fastest laps: 0
- Best finish: 22nd in 2026

Previous series
- 2026: GB3

Lewis Gilbert (born 24 June 2004) is a British racing driver who last competed in the British Touring Car Championship for WSR.

He previously competed in the GB3 Championship for Arden Motorsport.

== Career ==
=== Karting (2017–) ===
Gilbert began karting in 2017. In his first year of karting, Gilbert won the Mini Max title in the Super One Series, before ending the year by finishing second in the IAME International Final in the X30 Junior category. Moving up to junior karts full-time for 2018, Gilbert won the IAME Euro Series title and the Kartmasters British Grand Prix, as well as making his maiden appearance at the RMC Grand Finals at season's end.

Stepping up to senior karts in 2019, Gilbert finished second in the Kartmasters British GP's Rotax class, as well as taking third in the IAME Euro Series and RMC International Trophy between Strawberry and Potenza Racing. In 2020, Gilbert began the year by finishing third in the Rotax Winter Cup for Potenza, before returning to Strawberry for the second half of the year and taking fourth in the IAME International Games. The following year, Gilbert began the year with strawberry, finishing fourth in the IAME International Open, prior to reuniting with Potenza for the final races of the year.

In 2022, Gilbert elected to continue in Rotax-fielding series, a year in which he finished second in both the RMC International Trophy and the RMC Grand Finals for Potenza. Switching to Kraft Motorsport for 2023, Gilbert finished runner-up in the BNL Kart Series, third in the Rotax British O Plate and fourth in the RMC International Trophy. Continuing with the team for 2024, Gilbert finished third in the RMC Asia Festival in January, before finishing second in the RMC International Trophy six months later. Scaling back to a part-time schedule for 2025, Gilbert finished second in the RMC International Trophy and the Kartmasters British GP with Potenza and Kraft respectively. In parallel to his maiden season in cars in 2026, Gilbert continued competing in Rotax-sanctioned competitions in Europe.

=== Single-seater and BTCC debut (2026) ===
In 2026, Gilbert stepped up to single-seaters, joining Arden Motorsport to compete in the GB3 Championship. After taking a best result of tenth in the first four rounds, Gilbert moved to WSR to compete in the final six rounds of the BTCC season. In his maiden outings in the BTCC, mainly remembered by a barrel roll crash in race one at Donington Park, Gilbert took a best result of tenth at Croft to end the year 22nd overall.

== Karting record ==
=== Karting career summary ===
Season	Series	Team	Position
2017	Rotax Max Winter Cup – Junior Max	Persistence Motorsport	14th
2017	Rotax Max Euro Trophy – Junior Max	Persistence Motorsport	8th
2017	Super One Series – Mini Max		1st
2017	BNL Golden Trophy – Junior Max		24th
2017	Super One Series – Rotax Junior		15th
2017	IAME International Final – X30 Junior	Persistence Motorsport	2nd
2018	IAME Winter Cup – X30 Junior	Persistence Motorsport	6th
2018	IAME Euro Series – X30 Junior	KR-Sport	1st
2018	Kartmasters British GP – X30 Junior	KR-Sport	1st
2018	IAME International Final – X30 Junior	KR-Sport	10th
2018	RMC Grand Finals – Junior Max	KR-Sport	5th
2019	IAME Winter Cup – X30 Senior	KR Sport	31st
2019	IAME Euro Series – X30 Senior	Persistence Motorsport	3rd
2019	Rotax Max Euro Trophy – Senior Max	Strawberry Racing	4th
2019	British Karting Championships – Rotax Senior	Persistence Motorsport	45th
2019	British Karting Championships – X30 Senior	Persistence Motorsport	47th
2019	RMC International Trophy – Senior Max	Strawberry Racing	3rd
2019	Kartmasters British GP – X30 Senior	Persistence Motorsport	7th
2019	Kartmasters British GP – Rotax Senior	Strawberry Racing	2nd
2019	IAME International Final – X30 Pro		25th
2020	IAME Winter Cup – X30 Senior	Privateer	15th
2020	Rotax Winter Cup – Senior Max	Potenza Racing Engines	3rd
2020	Rotax Max Euro Trophy – Senior Max	Potenza Racing Engines	12th
2020	IAME International Games – X30 Senior	Strawberry Racing	4th
2020	RMC International Trophy – Senior Max	Strawberry Racing	33rd
2021	Rotax Max Euro Trophy – Senior Max	Strawberry Racing	7th
2021	British Karting Championship – X30 Senior	Strawberry Racing	37th
2021	IAME International Open – X30 Senior	Strawberry Racing	4th
2021	Rotax Max Euro Golden Trophy – Senior Max	Potenza Racing	12th
2021	Kartmasters British GP – Rotax Senior	Potenza Racing	2nd
2021	RMC Grand Finals – Senior Max	Potenza Racing	14th
2022	British Karting Championship – Rotax Senior	Potenza Racing Engines	13th
2022	Rotax Max Euro Trophy – Senior Max	Potenza Racing Engines	8th
2022	Rotax British O Plate – Senior Max	Potenza Racing Engines	3rd
2022	Kartmasters British GP – Rotax Senior	Potenza Racing Engines	11th
2022	RMC International Trophy – Senior Max	Potenza Racing Engines	2nd
2022	RMC Grand Finals – Senior Max	Potenza Racing Engines	2nd
2023	Rotax Winter Cup – Senior Max	Kraft Motorsport	5th
2023	BNL Kart Series – Senior Max	Kraft Motorsport	2nd
2023	British Karting Championship – Rotax Senior	Kraft Motorsport	4th
2023	Rotax Max Euro Trophy – Senior Max	Kraft Motorsport	6th
2023	Kartmasters British GP – Rotax Senior	Kraft Motorsport	5th
2023	Rotax British O Plate – Senior Max	Kraft Motorsport	3rd
2023	RMC International Trophy – Senior Max	Kraft Motorsport	4th
2023	RMC Grand Finals – Senior Max	Kraft Motorsport	18th
2024	Rotax Winter Cup – Senior Max	Kraft Motorsport	5th
2024	Rotax Max Euro Trophy – Senior Max	Kraft Motorsport	7th
2024	British Karting Championship – Rotax Senior	Kraft Motorsport	27th
2024	RMC International Trophy – Senior Max	Kraft Motorsport	2nd
2024	Champions of the Future Euro Series – OK	Kraft Motorsport	42nd
2024	Karting World Championship – OK	Kraft Motorsport	33rd
2024	RMC Asia Festival – Senior Max	Kraft Motorsport	3rd
2024	RMC Grand Finals – Senior Max	Kraft Motorsport	12th
2025	Rotax Max Euro Trophy – Rotax Senior	Kraft Motorsport	40th
2025	RMC International Trophy – Senior Max	Potenza Racing Engines	2nd
2025	Kartmasters British GP – Rotax Senior	Kraft Motorsport	2nd
2026	Rotax Max Winter Cup – Senior Max	Kraft Motorsport	6th
2026	Rotax Max Euro Trophy – Senior Max	Potenza Racing Engines	3rd*

== Racing record ==
=== Racing career summary ===
Season	Series	Team	Races	Wins	Poles	F/Laps	Podiums	Points	Position
2026	GB3 Championship	Arden Motorsport	11	0	0	0	0	61	20th
2026	British Touring Car Championship	WSR	16	0	0	0	0	21	22nd

=== Complete GB3 Championship results ===
(key) (Races in bold indicate pole position; races in italics indicate fastest lap)

Year	Entrant	1	2	3	4	5	6	7	8	9	10	11	12	13	14	15	16	17	18	19	20	21	22	23	24	Pos	Points
2026	Arden Motorsport	SIL1; 1; 18	SIL1; 2; 16	SIL1; 3; 17^{6}	SPA; 1; 10	SPA; 2; 10	SPA; 3 C	HUN; 1; 16	HUN; 2; 13	HUN; 3; 12^{5}	RBR; 1 Ret	RBR; 2; 13	RBR; 3 Ret	SIL2; 1	SIL2; 2	SIL2; 3	DON; 1	DON; 2	DON; 3	BRH; 1	BRH; 2	BRH; 3	CAT; 1	CAT; 2	CAT; 3	20th	61

* Season still in progress.

=== Complete British Touring Car Championship results ===
(key) Races in bold indicate pole position (1 point awarded – 2002–2003 all races, 2004–present just in first race) Races in italics indicate fastest lap (1 point awarded all races) * signifies that driver lead race for at least one lap (1 point awarded – 2002 just in feature races, 2003–present all races; ^{Superscript} number indicates points-scoring qualifying race position)

Year	Team	Car	1	2	3	4	5	6	7	8	9	10	11	12	13	14	15	16	17	18	19	20	21	22	23	24	25	26	27	28	29	30	DC	Points
2026	WSR	BMW 330i M Sport LCI	DON; 1	DON; 2	DON; 3	BRH; 1	BRH; 2	BRH; 3	SNE; 1	SNE; 2	SNE; 3	OUL; 1	OUL; 2	OUL; 3	THR; 1; 21	THR; 2; 21	THR; 3; 16	KNO; 1 Ret	KNO; 2 Ret	KNO; 3; 18	DON; 1 Ret	DON; 2 WD	DON; 3 WD	CRO; 1; 10	CRO; 2; 11	CRO; 3; 12	SIL; 1; 20	SIL; 2; 20	SIL; 3; 15	BRH; 1; 13	BRH; 2; 15	BRH; 3; 15	22nd	21
