= MB Motorsport =

British motor racing team

- Founded: 2020
- Nation: (United Kingdom) British
- Team principal(s): Mark Blundell; Craig Porley; Gary Paffett
- Founder(s): Mark Blundell
- Current series: British Touring Car Championship
- Current drivers: British Touring Car Championship; 50. (Republic of Ireland) Árón Taylor-Smith; 52. (United Kingdom) Gordon Shedden
- Noted drivers: (United Kingdom) Jake Hill (United Kingdom) Sam Osborne (United Kingdom) Ollie Jackson
- Drivers' Championships: British Touring Car Championship; 2024 – Jake Hill

Mark Blundell Motorsport, currently competing as Laser Tools Racing with MB Motorsport, is a British racing team founded by Mark Blundell. The team currently competes in the British Touring Car Championship.

The team won the 2024 British Touring Car Championship with Jake Hill.

== History ==
Founded in 2020, MB Motorsport ran the Honda Civic Type R (FK2). Blundell would put 2019 teammate Jake Hill in the first car, whilst Sam Osborne filled the second seat. Blue Square came on as a title sponsor, naming the team as MB Motorsport accelerated by Blue Square.

The team moved to Motorbase Performance's Ford Focus ST for 2021, with Hill being retained. Osborne moved over to the Racing with Wera & Photon Group stable, with Ollie Jackson being brought in to replace him.

Blundell moved the newly renamed ROKiT MB Motorsport to West Surrey Racing, utilising the BMW 330e M Sport which won the 2019 championship with Colin Turkington. The team was a single car effort, with Jackson staying at Motorbase Performance whilst Jake Hill moved with the team to the BMW. Hill scored 3 wins on his was to the team's best P3 in the championship.

Hill remained with MB Motorsport for 2023, with Laser Tools Racing providing title sponsorship after Aiden Moffat's family team ended its span. Hill more than doubled the teams' win tally, adding 6 wins to a previous 5.

The team remained unchanged for 2024, with Jake Hill still piloting their lone BMW 330e M Sport. Hill would score 8 wins and score a podiums in more than half of the races in the season, on his way to winning his and the team's first Drivers' Championship, 8 points ahead of Tom Ingram.

The newly renumbered No. 1 car of Jake Hill remained with the team for 2025. Hill suffered an ear infection at Croft, where Colin Turkington participated in second practice. Ultimately, the team withdrew the car, with Hill nor Turkington piloting the BMW. MB Motorsport scored an equal best Teams' Championship result of 5th.

2026 saw Jake Hill depart for GT Racing. MB Motorsport moved over to the Toyota Corolla GR Sport, with 2025 Toyota Gazoo Racing drivers Árón Taylor-Smith and Gordon Shedden driving the cars. Taylor-Smith sported the number 50, a reference to Laser Tools' 50th year.

== Results ==
Year	Name	Car	No.	Driver	Races	Wins	Poles	F/Laps	Podiums	Points	DC	CC Pts	CC
2020	MB Motorsport accelerated by Blue Square	Honda Civic Type R (FK2)	4	(United Kingdom) Sam Osborne	30	0	0	0	0	29	19th	181	8th
2020	MB Motorsport accelerated by Blue Square	Honda Civic Type R (FK2)	24	(United Kingdom) Jake Hill	30	0	0	0	6	212	7th	181	8th
2021	MB Motorsport accelerated by Blue Square	Ford Focus ST	24	(United Kingdom) Jake Hill	30	2	0	2	9	295	5th	384	6th
2021	MB Motorsport accelerated by Blue Square	Ford Focus ST	48	(United Kingdom) Ollie Jackson	30	0	0	0	1	77	18th	384	6th
2022	ROKiT MB Motorsport	BMW 330e M Sport	24	(United Kingdom) Jake Hill	30	3	2	5	13	381	3rd	371	5th
2023	Laser Tools Racing with MB Motorsport	BMW 330e M Sport	24	(United Kingdom) Jake Hill	30	6	0	5	11	372	3rd	381	6th
2024	Laser Tools Racing with MB Motorsport	BMW 330e M Sport	24	(United Kingdom) Jake Hill	30	8	1	1	16	421	1st	412	6th
2025	Laser Tools Racing with MB Motorsport	BMW 330i M Sport LCI	1	(United Kingdom) Jake Hill	27	3	1	0	7	295	4th	319	5th
2026	Laser Tools Racing with MB Motorsport	Toyota Corolla GR Sport	50	(Republic of Ireland) Árón Taylor-Smith									
2026	Laser Tools Racing with MB Motorsport	Toyota Corolla GR Sport	52	(United Kingdom) Gordon Shedden									
