= Plato Racing =

British racing team

CPRL
- Founded: 2025
- Nation: (United Kingdom) British
- Founder(s): Jason Plato
- Former names: Plato Racing (2025–2026)
- Base: Wellingborough, Northamptonshire, England
- Team principal(s): Dave Kelly
- Current series: British Touring Car Championship
- Current drivers: 32. (United Kingdom) Daniel Rowbottom; 33. (United Kingdom) Adam Morgan

CPRL (Cataclean Plato Racing Limited.), formerly Plato Racing, is a British racing team which currently competes in the British Touring Car Championship in collaboration with the RML Group. As of August 2026, the team is in administration. The team is no longer connected to founder and namesake Jason Plato.

== History ==
At the Silverstone round of the 2025 British Touring Car Championship, Jason Plato stated on an ITV Sport interview with Louise Goodman that he would be starting his own team for 2026. Later into 2025, Jason Plato confirmed the team would be run in collaboration with the RML Group, utilising the RML warehouse as the team base.

Jason Plato confirmed on 7 January 2026 via a newspaper article that the team would use two Mercedes-AMG A35 Saloons.

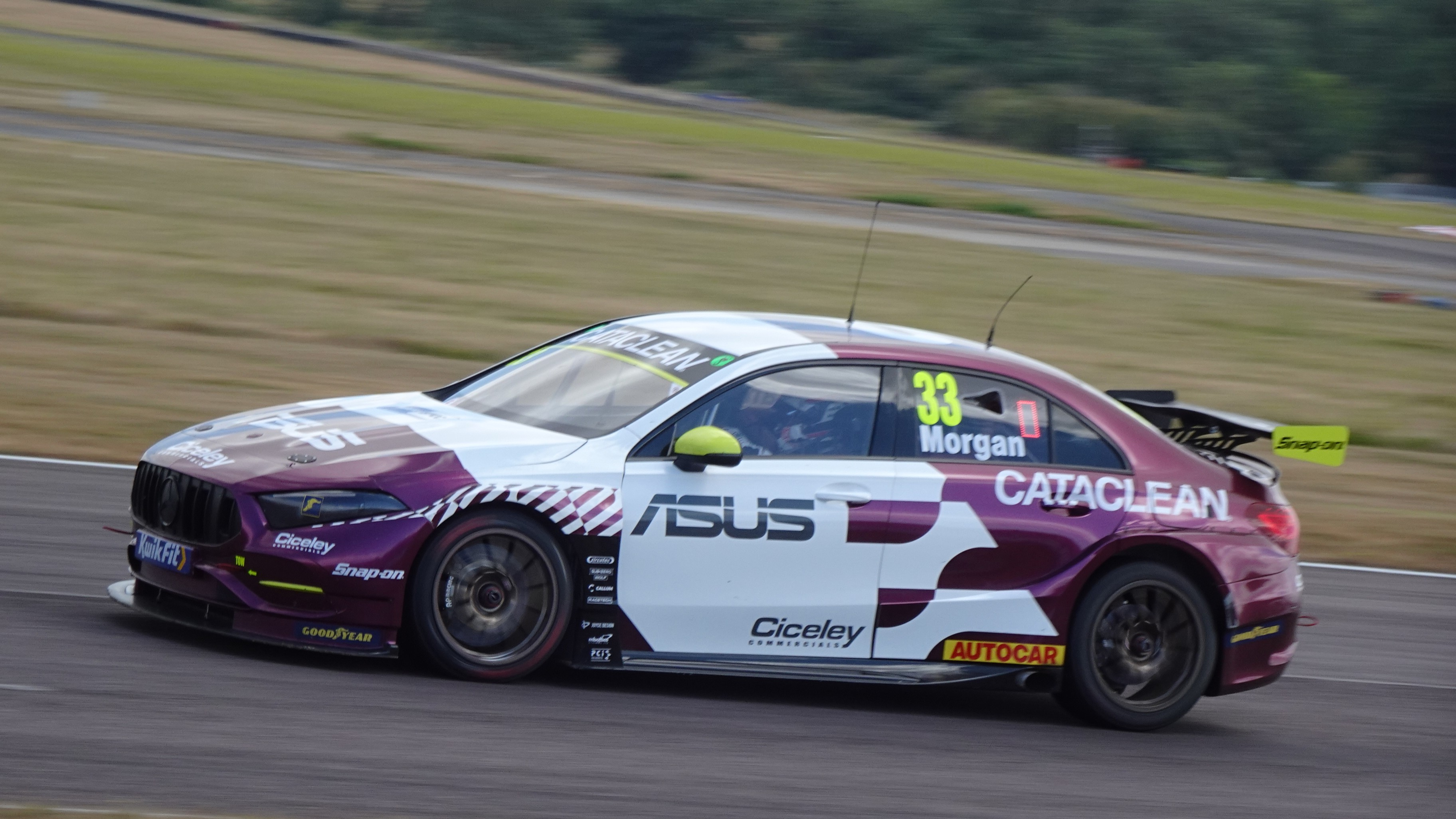
Morgan competing for Plato Racing at Thruxton Circuit in 2026

Plato announced on 17 February that former NAPA Racing UK driver Daniel Rowbottom would pilot one of the cars for 2026. Rowbottom also became a co-owner of the team. Adam Morgan later followed suit with his announcement on 3 March, reuniting the pair after first being team mates during Rowbottom's rookie season in 2019.

Rowbottom driving the team's CPRL livery at Silverstone Circuit in 2026

At their debut race weekend at the Donington Park National race on 18 April, Rowbottom took pole position for the first race after winning Saturday's qualifying race. During round six of the season at Knockhill on 9 August, Morgan secured the team's first BTCC race victory.

Plato Racing entered administration on 11 August 2026, with the notice of administration applied for by title sponsor Cataclean Global. The team is currently searching for investment to continue operations. On 18 August, it was confirmed that Cataclean Global would enter the cars in the upcoming Donington Park round of the season under the new name "CPRL" as administration proceedings continue. Dave Kelly was appointed team principal.

== Racing record ==
Year	Name	Car	No.	Driver	Races	Wins	Poles	F/Laps	Podiums	Points	DC	CC Pts	CC
2026	Cataclean Plato Racing (1–6) CPRL (7–10)	Mercedes A35 Saloon	32	(United Kingdom) Daniel Rowbottom	30	0	1	2	4	268	8th	201	9th (Note: The team were divided into separate entries after the team entered under CPRL. Cataclean Plato Racing placed 7th, with 282 points.)
2026	Cataclean Plato Racing (1–6) CPRL (7–10)	Mercedes A35 Saloon	33	(United Kingdom) Adam Morgan	30	3	2	2	5	288	5th	201	9th
