= 2021 British Touring Car Championship =

64th season of the British Touring Car Championship

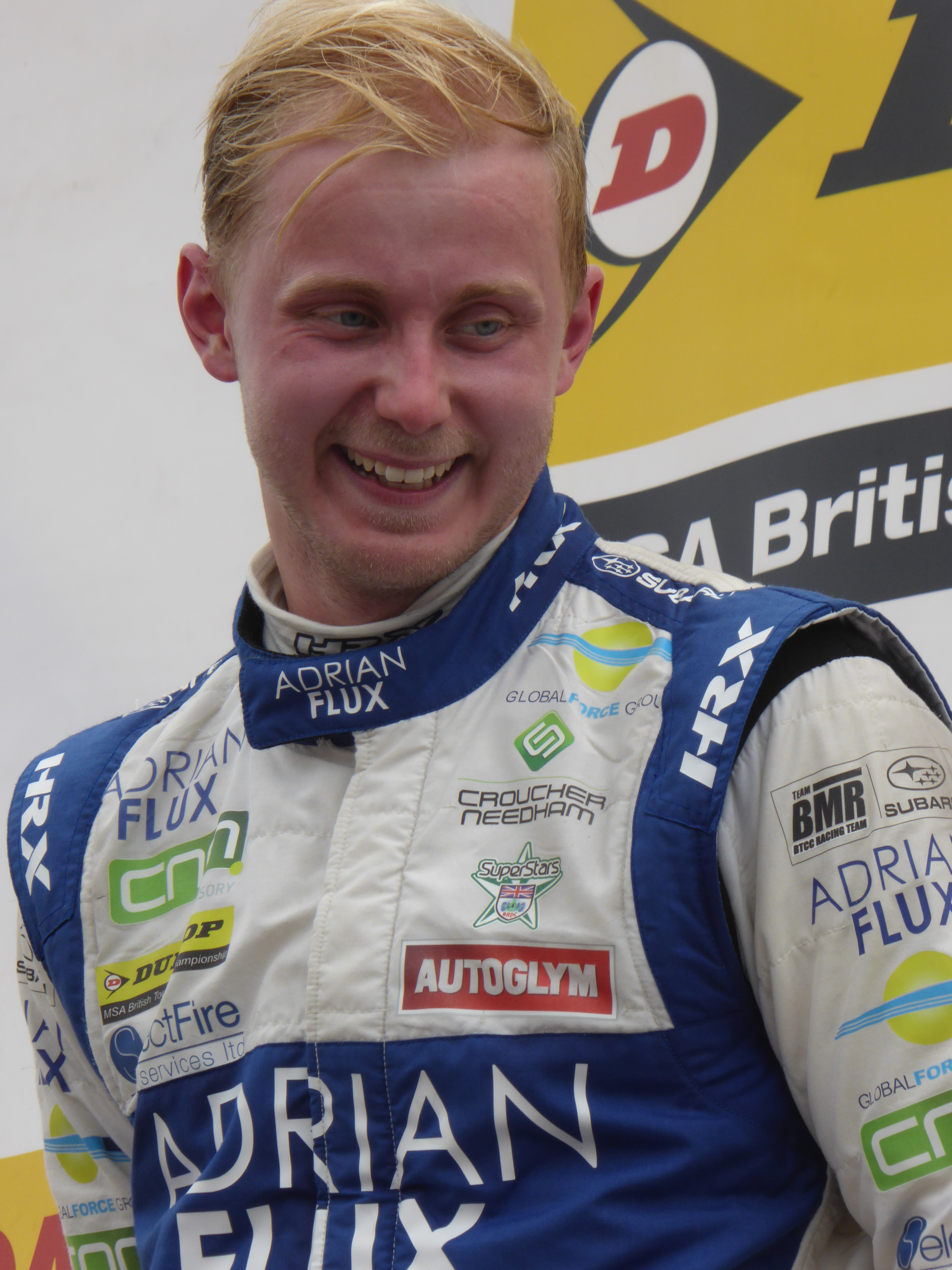
Ashley Sutton defended the Drivers' Championship title, winning it by 51 points.

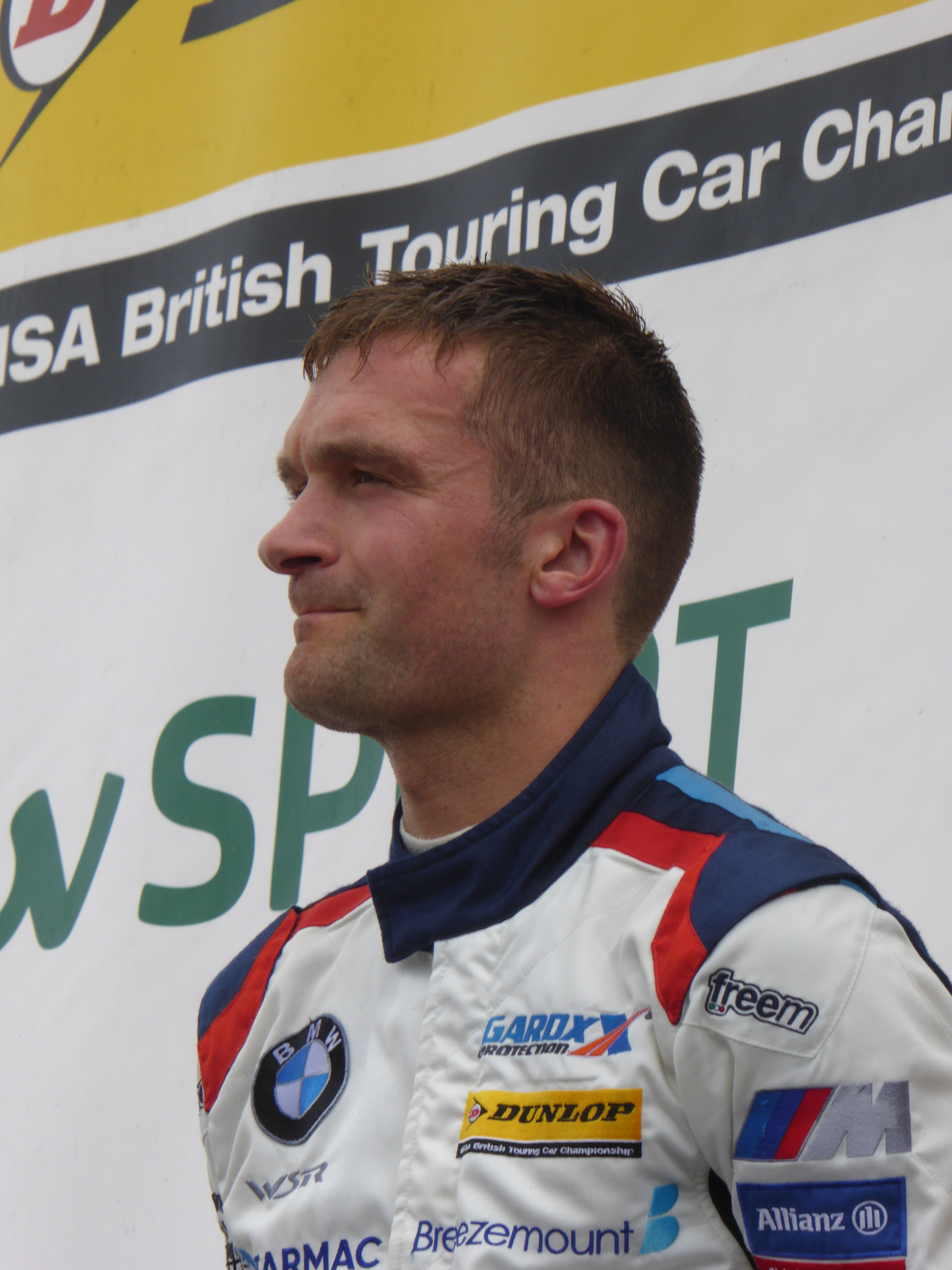
Colin Turkington finished second in the Drivers' Championship.

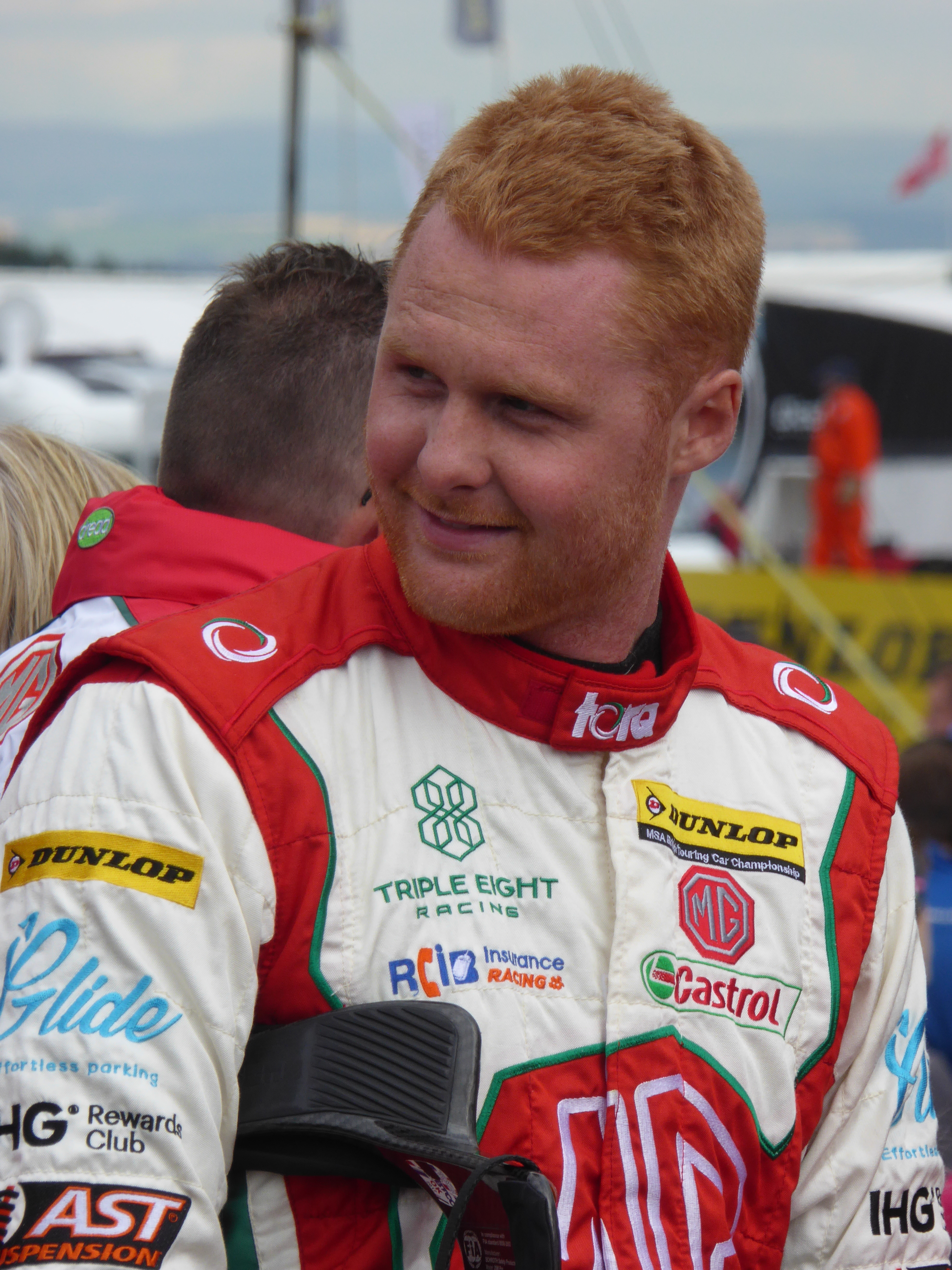
Josh Cook finished third in the Drivers' Championship, 3 points behind second.

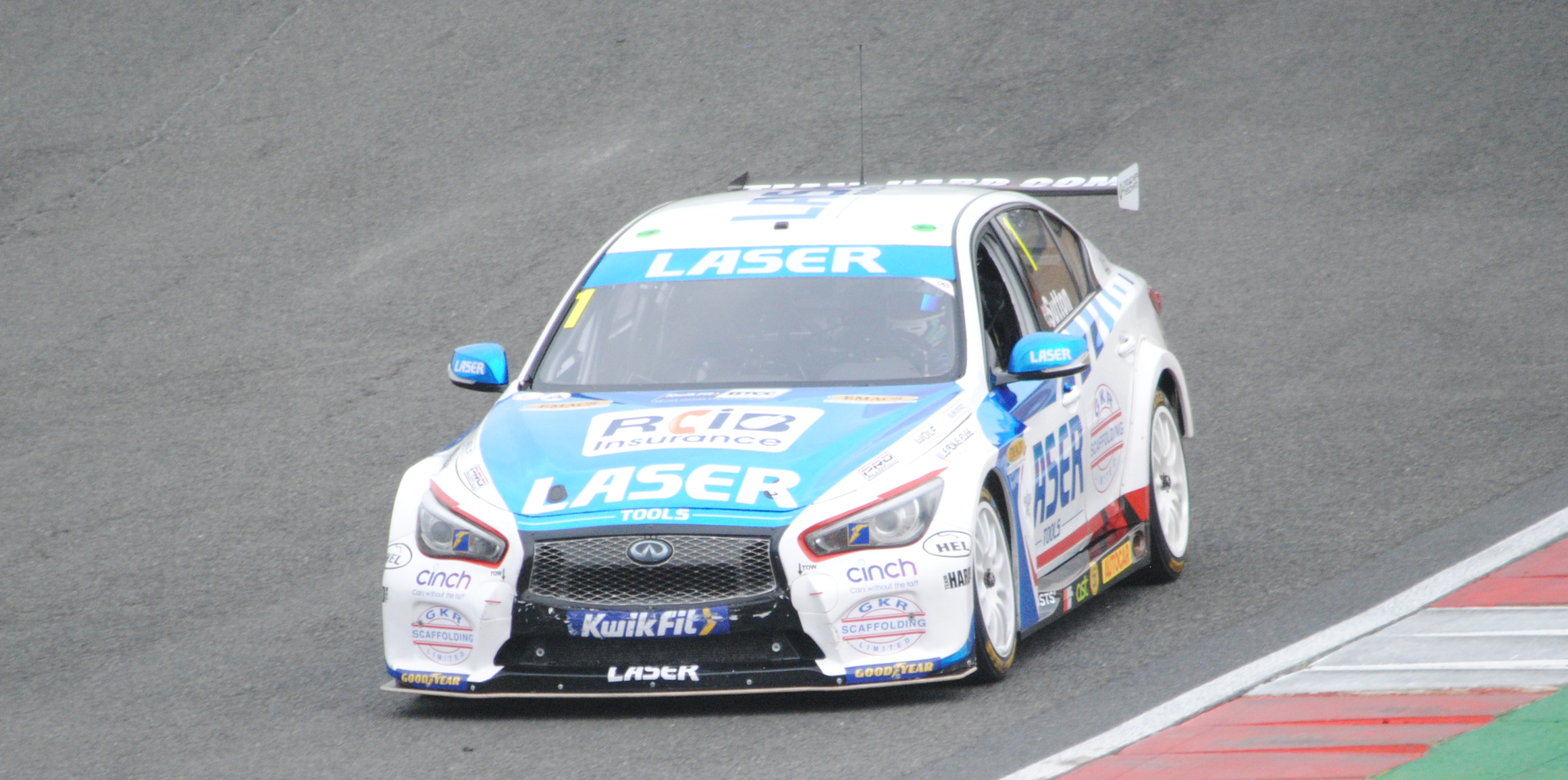
2021 Teams' Champion Laser Tools Racing

The 2021 Kwik Fit British Touring Car Championship (commonly abbreviated as BTCC) was a motor racing championship for production-based touring cars held across England and Scotland. The championship features a mix of professional motor racing teams and privately funded amateur drivers competing in highly modified versions of family cars which are sold to the general public and conform to the technical regulations for the championship. The 2021 season was the 64th British Touring Car Championship season and the eleventh season for cars conforming to the Next Generation Touring Car (NGTC) technical specification. Ash Sutton successfully defended his title to become the youngest ever three time BTCC Champion.

== Teams and drivers ==
Team	Car	Engine	No.	Drivers	Rounds
Constructor Entries
Team BMW	BMW 330i M Sport	BMW/Neil Brown	2	(United Kingdom) Colin Turkington	All
Team BMW	BMW 330i M Sport	BMW/Neil Brown	12	(United Kingdom) Stephen Jelley	All
Team BMW	BMW 330i M Sport	BMW/Neil Brown	15	(United Kingdom) Tom Oliphant	All
Racing with Wera & Photon Group	Ford Focus ST	Ford/Mountune	4	(United Kingdom) Sam Osborne	All
Racing with Wera & Photon Group	Ford Focus ST	Ford/Mountune	20	(United Kingdom) Paul Rivett	5–6
Racing with Wera & Photon Group	Ford Focus ST	Ford/Mountune	21	(United Kingdom) Jessica Hawkins	2
Racing with Wera & Photon Group	Ford Focus ST	Ford/Mountune	44	(United Kingdom) Andy Neate	1, 3–4, 7–10
MB Motorsport accelerated by Blue Square	Ford Focus ST	Ford/Mountune	24	(United Kingdom) Jake Hill	All
MB Motorsport accelerated by Blue Square	Ford Focus ST	Ford/Mountune	48	(United Kingdom) Ollie Jackson	All
Toyota Gazoo Racing UK	Toyota Corolla GR Sport	TOCA/Swindon	6	(United Kingdom) Rory Butcher	All
Toyota Gazoo Racing UK	Toyota Corolla GR Sport	TOCA/Swindon	23	(United Kingdom) Sam Smelt	All
Independent Entries
Laser Tools Racing	Infiniti Q50	TOCA/Swindon	1	(United Kingdom) Ashley Sutton	All
Laser Tools Racing	Infiniti Q50	TOCA/Swindon	16	(United Kingdom) Aiden Moffat	All
Laser Tools Racing	Infiniti Q50	TOCA/Swindon	41	(United Kingdom) Carl Boardley	All
Team HARD with Autobrite Direct	Cupra León	TOCA/Swindon	19	(United Kingdom) Jack Mitchell	4–10
Team HARD with Autobrite Direct	Cupra León	TOCA/Swindon	31	(United Kingdom) Jack Goff	All
Team HARD with Autobrite Direct	Cupra León	TOCA/Swindon	88	(United Kingdom) Glynn Geddie	1–3
ROKiT Racing with iQuoto Online Trading	Cupra León	TOCA/Swindon	28	(United Kingdom) Nicolas Hamilton	All
Team HARD with HUB Financial Solutions	Cupra León	TOCA/Swindon	40	(Republic of Ireland) Árón Taylor-Smith	All
Car Gods with Ciceley Motorsport	BMW 330i M Sport	BMW/Neil Brown	3	(United Kingdom) Tom Chilton	All
Car Gods with Ciceley Motorsport	BMW 330i M Sport	BMW/Neil Brown	33	(United Kingdom) Adam Morgan	All
Adrian Flux with Power Maxed Racing	Vauxhall Astra	TOCA/Swindon	11	(United Kingdom) Jason Plato	All
Adrian Flux with Power Maxed Racing	Vauxhall Astra	TOCA/Swindon	123	(United Kingdom) Daniel Lloyd	All
BTC Racing	Honda Civic Type R	TOCA/Swindon	18	(United Kingdom) Senna Proctor	2–10
BTC Racing	Honda Civic Type R	TOCA/Swindon	27	(United Kingdom) Dan Cammish	1
BTC Racing	Honda Civic Type R	TOCA/Swindon	66	(United Kingdom) Josh Cook	All
PHSC with BTC Racing	Honda Civic Type R	TOCA/Swindon	99	(United Kingdom) Jade Edwards	All
Ginsters Excelr8 with TradePriceCars.com	Hyundai i30 Fastback N Performance	TOCA/Swindon	22	(United Kingdom) Chris Smiley	All
Ginsters Excelr8 with TradePriceCars.com	Hyundai i30 Fastback N Performance	TOCA/Swindon	80	(United Kingdom) Tom Ingram	All
Excelr8 with TradePriceCars.com	Hyundai i30 Fastback N Performance	TOCA/Swindon	42	(United Kingdom) Nick Halstead	7
Excelr8 with TradePriceCars.com	Hyundai i30 Fastback N Performance	TOCA/Swindon	55	(United Kingdom) Andy Wilmot	10
Excelr8 with TradePriceCars.com	Hyundai i30 Fastback N Performance	TOCA/Swindon	62	(United Kingdom) Rick Parfitt Jr.	1–6, 8–10
Excelr8 with TradePriceCars.com	Hyundai i30 Fastback N Performance	TOCA/Swindon	96	(United Kingdom) Jack Butel	1–9
Halfords Racing with Cataclean	Honda Civic Type R	Honda/Neil Brown	32	(United Kingdom) Daniel Rowbottom	All
Halfords Racing with Cataclean	Honda Civic Type R	Honda/Neil Brown	52	(United Kingdom) Gordon Shedden	All
Hybrid Test Entries
TOCA / Cosworth / M-Sport (Note: Car run by Speedworks Motorsport.)	Toyota Corolla GR Hybrid	TOCA/M-Sport	2022	(United Kingdom) Andrew Jordan	8

Key
Eligible for the Jack Sears Trophy for drivers yet to record an overall podium finish or Jack Sears Trophy championship at the start of the season.
Hybrid Test entry ineligible for any championship points
Entry List

=== Driver changes ===
Entering/re-entering BTCC

- Irish driver Árón Taylor-Smith returned to the series after having last raced in 2017 for MG Racing RCIB Insurance, driving a third car for Team HARD.
- Jason Plato returned to the series and Power Maxed Racing after taking a sabbatical last year due to the COVID-19 pandemic.
- Sam Smelt returned to the series after having last raced in 2018 for AmD with Cobra Exhausts, driving a new second car for Toyota Gazoo Racing UK.
- Musician and 2017 British GT Championship winner Rick Parfitt Jr. debuted with Excelr8 Trade Price Cars.
- Triple BTCC champion Gordon Shedden returned to the series and Team Dynamics, after having last raced in 2017, replacing Dan Cammish.
- 2018 TCR UK winner Dan Lloyd returned to the series after having last raced in 2018 for BTC Norlin Racing, driving a Second car for Power Maxed Racing.
- Daniel Rowbottom returned to the series after having last raced in 2019 for Cataclean Racing with Ciceley Motorsport, driving a second car for Team Dynamics to replace Matt Neal.
- 2018 British GT Championship GT4 winner Jack Mitchell debuted with Team HARD with Autobrite Direct at Oulton Park replacing Glynn Geddie.
- 2013 winner Andrew Jordan returned to the series after having last raced in 2019 for BMW Pirtek Racing, driving an all new hybrid car as a test entry for Toyota Gazoo Racing UK.
- 2018 Ginetta GT5 Challenge Group AM winner Nick Halstead debuted with Excelr8 with TradePriceCars.com at Croft replacing Rick Parfitt Jr.
- Andy Wilmot returned to the series after having last raced in 2015 for Welch Motorsport, driving for Excelr8 with TradePriceCars.com at Brands Hatch GP to replace Jack Butel.

Changed teams

- Jack Butel will move from Carlube TripleR Racing with Mac Tools to Excelr8 Trade Price Cars.
- Carl Boardley will move from HUB Financial Solutions with Team HARD to Laser Tools Racing.
- Tom Chilton will move from BTC Racing to Ciceley Motorsport.
- Jade Edwards will move from Power Maxed Car Care Racing to BTC Racing.
- Tom Ingram will move from Toyota Gazoo Racing UK to Excelr8 Trade Price Cars.
- Rory Butcher will move from Motorbase Performance to Toyota Gazoo Racing UK.
- Sam Osborne and Ollie Jackson will swap their seats between MB Motorsport and Motorbase Performance.
- Stephen Jelley will move from Team Parker Racing to Team BMW.
- Dan Cammish will move from Team Dynamics to BTC Racing after the withdrawal of Michael Crees at Thruxton.
- Senna Proctor will move from Excelr8 Motorsport to BTC Racing to replace Dan Cammish at Snetterton.
- Jessica Hawkins will move from Power Maxed Car Care Racing to Racing with Wera & Photon Group to replace Andy Neate at Snetterton.
- Paul Rivett will move from GKR TradePriceCars.com to Racing with Wera & Photon Group to replace Andy Neate at Knockhill and Thruxton.

Leaving BTCC

- Bobby Thompson will leave due to budget reasons.
- Matt Neal will take a year sabbatical from the series, being replaced by Daniel Rowbottom.
- Michael Crees will leave the series after parting company with BTC Racing.

=== Team changes ===
- Team HARD. will switch from running the Volkswagen CC to the new Cupra León.
- TradePriceCars.com will merge with Excelr8 Motorsport and will switch from running the Audi S3 Saloon to Hyundai i30 Fastback N Performance.
- Ciceley Motorsport will switch from running the Mercedes-Benz A-Class to WSR-prepared BMW 330i M Sport cars.
- Motorbase Performance will switch from running the Honda Civic Type R (FK2) to four Ford Focus ST cars, two of which will be entered under the Motorbase banner.
- Team Dynamics will return to the Independents Championship for the first time since 2006, following the withdrawal of works backing from Honda.
- Team Parker Racing sold their TBL to Carl Boardley and will leave the championship.

== Race calendar ==
The championship calendar was announced by the championship organisers on 20 July 2020, before it was rescheduled on 14 January 2021 in order to maximise the opportunity for spectators and guests to attend, as a result of the COVID-19 pandemic.

2021 BTCC Race Locations

Round		Circuit	Date
1	R1	Thruxton Circuit (Hampshire)	8–9 May
1	R2	Thruxton Circuit (Hampshire)	8–9 May
1	R3	Thruxton Circuit (Hampshire)	8–9 May
2	R4	Snetterton Motor Racing Circuit (300 Circuit, Norfolk)	12–13 June
2	R5	Snetterton Motor Racing Circuit (300 Circuit, Norfolk)	12–13 June
2	R6	Snetterton Motor Racing Circuit (300 Circuit, Norfolk)	12–13 June
3	R7	Brands Hatch (Indy Circuit, Kent)	26–27 June
3	R8	Brands Hatch (Indy Circuit, Kent)	26–27 June
3	R9	Brands Hatch (Indy Circuit, Kent)	26–27 June
4	R10	Oulton Park (Island Circuit, Cheshire)	31 July – 1 August
4	R11	Oulton Park (Island Circuit, Cheshire)	31 July – 1 August
4	R12	Oulton Park (Island Circuit, Cheshire)	31 July – 1 August
5	R13	Knockhill Racing Circuit (Fife)	14–15 August
5	R14	Knockhill Racing Circuit (Fife)	14–15 August
5	R15	Knockhill Racing Circuit (Fife)	14–15 August
6	R16	Thruxton Circuit (Hampshire)	28–29 August
6	R17	Thruxton Circuit (Hampshire)	28–29 August
6	R18	Thruxton Circuit (Hampshire)	28–29 August
7	R19	Croft Circuit (North Yorkshire)	18–19 September
7	R20	Croft Circuit (North Yorkshire)	18–19 September
7	R21	Croft Circuit (North Yorkshire)	18–19 September
8	R22	Silverstone Circuit (National Circuit, Northamptonshire)	25–26 September
8	R23	Silverstone Circuit (National Circuit, Northamptonshire)	25–26 September
8	R24	Silverstone Circuit (National Circuit, Northamptonshire)	25–26 September
9	R25	Donington Park (National Circuit, Leicestershire)	9–10 October
9	R26	Donington Park (National Circuit, Leicestershire)	9–10 October
9	R27	Donington Park (National Circuit, Leicestershire)	9–10 October
10	R28	Brands Hatch (Grand Prix Circuit, Kent)	23–24 October
10	R29	Brands Hatch (Grand Prix Circuit, Kent)	23–24 October
10	R30	Brands Hatch (Grand Prix Circuit, Kent)	23–24 October

== Season report ==
The first two races of the season were won by Josh Cook. Defending champion Ash Sutton won the third race after a battle with Jake Hill in mixed weather conditions.

== Results ==
All drivers raced under British licences.

Round		Circuit	Pole position	Fastest lap	Winning driver	Winning team	Winning independent	Winning JST
1	R1	Thruxton Circuit	Ashley Sutton	Josh Cook	Josh Cook	BTC Racing	Josh Cook	Daniel Rowbottom
1	R2	Thruxton Circuit		Josh Cook	Josh Cook	BTC Racing	Josh Cook	Daniel Rowbottom
1	R3	Thruxton Circuit		Josh Cook	Ashley Sutton	Laser Tools Racing	Ashley Sutton	Sam Osborne
2	R4	Snetterton Circuit	Colin Turkington	Colin Turkington	Colin Turkington	Team BMW	Tom Ingram	Daniel Rowbottom
2	R5	Snetterton Circuit		Ashley Sutton	Ashley Sutton	Laser Tools Racing	Ashley Sutton	Daniel Rowbottom
2	R6	Snetterton Circuit		Gordon Shedden	Tom Ingram	Ginsters Excelr8 with TradePriceCars.com	Tom Ingram	Daniel Rowbottom
3	R7	Brands Hatch Indy	Daniel Rowbottom	Gordon Shedden	Tom Oliphant	Team BMW	Gordon Shedden	Daniel Rowbottom
3	R8	Brands Hatch Indy		Josh Cook	Tom Ingram	Ginsters Excelr8 with TradePriceCars.com	Tom Ingram	Daniel Rowbottom
3	R9	Brands Hatch Indy		Rory Butcher	Adam Morgan	Car Gods with Ciceley Motorsport	Adam Morgan	Daniel Rowbottom
4	R10	Oulton Park	Senna Proctor	Gordon Shedden	Daniel Rowbottom	Halfords Racing with Cataclean	Daniel Rowbottom	Daniel Rowbottom
4	R11	Oulton Park		Tom Ingram	Rory Butcher	Toyota Gazoo Racing UK	Daniel Rowbottom	Daniel Rowbottom
4	R12	Oulton Park		Tom Ingram	Senna Proctor	BTC Racing	Senna Proctor	Daniel Rowbottom
5	R13	Knockhill Racing Circuit	Colin Turkington	Colin Turkington	Colin Turkington	Team BMW	Senna Proctor	Daniel Rowbottom
5	R14	Knockhill Racing Circuit		Ashley Sutton	Ashley Sutton	Laser Tools Racing	Ashley Sutton	Carl Boardley
5	R15	Knockhill Racing Circuit		Rory Butcher	Tom Ingram	Ginsters Excelr8 with TradePriceCars.com	Tom Ingram	Daniel Rowbottom
6	R16	Thruxton Circuit	Daniel Rowbottom	Josh Cook	Josh Cook	BTC Racing	Josh Cook	Daniel Rowbottom
6	R17	Thruxton Circuit		Josh Cook	Ashley Sutton	Laser Tools Racing	Ashley Sutton	Jack Butel
6	R18	Thruxton Circuit		Tom Ingram	Adam Morgan	Car Gods with Ciceley Motorsport	Adam Morgan	Daniel Rowbottom
7	R19	Croft Circuit	Aiden Moffat	Josh Cook	Aiden Moffat	Laser Tools Racing	Aiden Moffat	Carl Boardley
7	R20	Croft Circuit		Tom Chilton	Jake Hill	MB Motorsport accelerated by Blue Square	Aiden Moffat	Sam Osborne
7	R21	Croft Circuit		Ashley Sutton	Colin Turkington	Team BMW	Gordon Shedden	Daniel Rowbottom
8	R22	Silverstone Circuit	Rory Butcher	Ashley Sutton	Rory Butcher	Toyota Gazoo Racing UK	Tom Ingram	Daniel Rowbottom
8	R23	Silverstone Circuit		Senna Proctor	Rory Butcher	Toyota Gazoo Racing UK	Tom Ingram	Daniel Rowbottom
8	R24	Silverstone Circuit		Jake Hill	Jake Hill	MB Motorsport accelerated by Blue Square	Daniel Lloyd	Daniel Rowbottom
9	R25	Donington Park	Gordon Shedden	Ashley Sutton	Gordon Shedden	Halfords Racing with Cataclean	Gordon Shedden	Sam Osborne
9	R26	Donington Park		Colin Turkington	Gordon Shedden	Halfords Racing with Cataclean	Gordon Shedden	Daniel Rowbottom
9	R27	Donington Park		Colin Turkington	Colin Turkington	Team BMW	Aiden Moffat	Daniel Rowbottom
10	R28	Brands Hatch GP	Senna Proctor	Gordon Shedden	Josh Cook	BTC Racing	Josh Cook	Daniel Rowbottom
10	R29	Brands Hatch GP		Daniel Rowbottom	Josh Cook	BTC Racing	Josh Cook	Daniel Rowbottom
10	R30	Brands Hatch GP		Jake Hill	Ashley Sutton	Laser Tools Racing	Ashley Sutton	Daniel Rowbottom

== Championship standings ==
Points system
1st	2nd	3rd	4th	5th	6th	7th	8th	9th	10th	11th	12th	13th	14th	15th	R1 PP	Fastest lap	Lead a lap
20	17	15	13	11	10	9	8	7	6	5	4	3	2	1	1	1	1

Notes

- No driver may collect more than one point for leading a lap per race regardless of how many laps they lead.

=== Drivers' Championship ===
Pos.	Driver	THR1			SNE			BHI			OUL			KNO			THR2			CRO			SIL			DON			BHGP			Pts
1	Ashley Sutton	9^{P}	9	1^{L}	11	1^{FL}	2	5	2	8	14	8	Ret	4	1^{FL}	5	5	1^{L}	10	6	5	3^{F}	7^{F}	4	3	7^{F}	4	8	6	6	1^{L}	357
2	Colin Turkington	10	7	6	1^{PFL}	2^{L}	7	20	17	14	18	12	8	1^{PFL}	2^{L}	8	12	6	2	4	7	1^{L}	6	3	8	5	11^{F}	1^{FL}	7	4	Ret	306
3	Josh Cook	1^{FL}	1^{FL}	20^{F}	16	14	4	9	5^{F}	5	15	Ret	12	3	4	Ret	1^{FL}	2^{FL}	7	5^{F}	3	5	5	DSQ	18	8	7	5	1^{L}	1^{L}	5	303
4	Tom Ingram	2	6	22	2	4	1^{L}	6	1^{L}	12	19	10^{F}	21^{F}	10	6	1^{L}	10	12	5^{F}	12	4	4	2^{L}	2	12	11	2^{L}	10	13	12	3	300
5	Jake Hill	3	3	3^{L}	9	24	12	4	27	13	8	4	7	6	3	Ret	2	4	4	2	1^{L}	7	21	9	1^{FL}	17	9	2	12	10	4^{F}	295
6	Gordon Shedden	Ret	18	4	15	11	3^{F}	2^{F}	21	16	2^{FL}	6	3	8	5	4	13	Ret	Ret	10	6	2	Ret	19	21	1^{PL}	1^{L}	13	3^{F}	3	7	251
7	Rory Butcher	5	Ret	Ret	3	5	6	15	14	7^{F}	4	1^{L}	Ret	9	Ret	20^{F}	4	5	6	19	Ret	11	1^{PL}	1^{L}	13	3	3^{L}	4	16	7	9	247
8	Aiden Moffat	11	8	Ret	14	10	17	8	9	3	6	5	4	7	11	7	18	13	13	1^{PL}	2	6	4	5	7	13	8	3	8	22	18	230
9	Daniel Rowbottom	7	4	21	13	15	10	3^{P}	4	11	1^{L}	2	6	15	18	10	6^{P}	NC	16	Ret	16	9	8	6	9	14	10	6	5	5^{F}	2	222
10	Senna Proctor				18	16	26	12	10	6	9^{P}	9	1^{L}	2	7	2	8	7	3	3	8	8	14	Ret^{F}	17	4	6	27	2^{P}	Ret	19	206
11	Daniel Lloyd	16	14	5	7	12	13	11	6	9	13	21	11	Ret	26	18	11	10	11	9	18	Ret	3	11	2^{L}	2	5	7	4	2	13	190
12	Stephen Jelley	Ret	11	10^{L}	4	7	5^{L}	14	Ret	22	5	7	2	11	9	3^{L}	15	14	14	13	10	14	9	8	5	15	13	9	23	9	24^{L}	174
13	Adam Morgan	8	21	18	6	8	8	17	12	1^{L}	3	3	5	13	16	13	7	8	1^{L}	8	9	17	Ret	17	16	Ret	DNS	25	14	Ret	16	161
14	Jason Plato	6	5	2	17	20	18	13	8	4	7	18	13	14	8	9	9	9	8	17	12	23	10	10	6	6	18	15	19	18	10	156
15	Chris Smiley	Ret	Ret	15	10	13	11	7	7	10	Ret	14	10	5	13	6	16	11	9	7	11	Ret	13	7	4	9	12	16	15	Ret	12	138
16	Tom Oliphant	15	10	7	8	6	16	1^{L}	3^{L}	15	Ret	DNS	14	Ret	17	14	3	3	12	20	Ret	13	11	21	11	16	24	20	11	Ret	15	129
17	Jack Goff	13	12	8	12	9	9	10	11	2	10	NC	16	16	12	26	20	16	18	18	15	Ret	19	15	15	20	15	14	17	11	8	90
18	Ollie Jackson	19	13	9	5	3	Ret	23	16	Ret	12	Ret	17	Ret	22	15	17	18	Ret	Ret	14	Ret	12	18	10	10	14	11	10	Ret	11	77
19	Tom Chilton	14	Ret	13	21	Ret	19	19	13	18	17	13	9	12	25	23	14	17	17	11	17^{F}	10	20	13	28	19	20	18	9	8	6	64
20	Árón Taylor-Smith	18	15	11	22	18	14	18	15	17	16	16	15	25	15	12	27	Ret	23	14	22	12	17	12	14	18	17	12	27	20	14	33
21	Dan Cammish	4	2	23																												30
22	Carl Boardley	12	17	Ret	20	17	Ret	16	20	19	11	11	Ret	18	10	11	24	21	Ret	15	23	15	15	Ret	19	27	23	17	22	15	Ret	29
23	Sam Osborne	17	16	12	19	19	20	21	19	20	NC	15	Ret	19	20	17	22	19	19	16	13	22	16	14	25	12	16	19	18	14	17	16
24	Sam Smelt	23	20	14	29	26	Ret	24	18	23	23	19	18	17	24	24	26	22	Ret	21	19	16	Ret	Ret	20	21	22	Ret	20	13	21	5
25	Jack Butel	21	19	19	26	22	21	25	25	21	20	17	Ret	20	14	16	19	15	15	23	26	19	18	16	23	23	25	Ret				4
26	Jade Edwards	20	Ret	Ret	25	23	15	22	22	27	21	20	20	26	23	19	21	24	Ret	27	21	Ret	22	Ret	24	25	21	26	26	16	20	1
27	Rick Parfitt Jr.	25	Ret	16	24	27	24	Ret	23	26	Ret	23	19	21	27	25	25	20	20				23	24	22	22	27	22	24	21	Ret	0
28	Jack Mitchell										22	22	Ret	22	21	22	23	Ret	21	22	20	Ret	Ret	22	Ret	24	19	21	21	17	Ret	0
29	Nicolas Hamilton	26	22	17	28	25	25	28	26	28	DNS	24	Ret	24	Ret	NC	28	25	22	25	Ret	20	24	25	27	28	28	24	Ret	Ret	23	0
30	Andy Neate	24	Ret	DNS				26	24	25	WD	WD	WD							24	24	18	Ret	23	26	26	26	23	Ret	Ret	22	0
31	Paul Rivett													23	19	21	29	23	Ret													0
32	Andy Wilmot																												25	19	25	0
33	Jessica Hawkins				23	21	23																									0
34	Nick Halstead																			26	25	21										0
35	Glynn Geddie	22	Ret	DNS	27	Ret	22	27	Ret	24																						0
Hybrid test entries ineligible for points
-	Andrew Jordan																						25	20	Ret							-

Colour	Result
Gold	Winner
Silver	2nd place
Bronze	3rd place
Green	Points finish
Blue	Non-points finish
Blue	Non-classified finish (NC)
Purple	Retired (Ret)
Red	Did not qualify (DNQ)
Red	Did not pre-qualify (DNPQ)
Black	Disqualified (DSQ)
White	Did not start (DNS)
White	Withdrew (WD)
White	Race cancelled (C)
Blank	Did not participate (DNP)
Blank	Excluded (EX)

^{P} – Pole position

^{F} – Fastest lap
^{L} – Lead race lap

=== Manufacturers'/Constructors' Championship ===
Pos.	Manufacturer	Constructor	Points
1	BMW	West Surrey Racing	869
2	Ford	Motorbase Performance	782
3	Toyota	Speedworks Motorsport	695

=== Teams' Championship ===
Pos.	Team	Points
1	Laser Tools Racing	588
2	BTC Racing	531
3	Halfords Racing with Cataclean	472
4	Team BMW	460
5	Ginsters Excelr8 with TradePriceCars.com	445
6	MB Motorsport accelerated by Blue Square	384
7	Adrian Flux with Power Maxed Racing	362
8	Toyota Gazoo Racing UK	252
9	Car Gods with Ciceley Motorsport	242
10	Team HARD with Autobrite Direct	94*
11	Team HARD with HUB Financial Solutions	47
12	Racing with Wera & Photon Group	28
13	Excelr8 with TradePriceCars.com	12
14	PHSC with BTC Racing	3
15	ROKiT Racing with iQuoto Online Trading	0

=== Independent Drivers' Championship ===
Pos.	Driver	Points
1	Ashley Sutton	404
2	Tom Ingram	360
3	Josh Cook	350
4	Aiden Moffat	304
5	Gordon Shedden	302
6	Daniel Rowbottom	293
7	Daniel Lloyd	263
8	Senna Proctor	257
9	Adam Morgan	238
10	Jason Plato	238
11	Chris Smiley	220
12	Jack Goff	185
13	Tom Chilton	133
14	Árón Taylor-Smith	120
15	Carl Boardley	94
16	Jack Butel	55
17	Dan Cammish	32
18	Jade Edwards	25
19	Rick Parfitt Jr.	23
20	Jack Mitchell	19
21	Nicolas Hamilton	10
22	Andy Wilmot	3
23	Nick Halstead	2
24	Glynn Geddie	0

=== Independent Teams' Championship ===
Pos.	Team	Points
1	Laser Tools Racing	483
2	Halfords Racing with Cataclean	435
3	BTC Racing	430
4	Ginsters Excelr8 with TradePriceCars.com	428
5	Adrian Flux with Power Maxed Racing	377
6	Car Gods with Ciceley Motorsport	350
7	Team HARD with Autobrite Direct	268*
8	Team HARD with HUB Financial Solutions	247
9	Excelr8 with TradePriceCars.com	224
10	PHSC with BTC Racing	163
11	ROKiT Racing with iQuoto Online Trading	132

=== Jack Sears Trophy ===
Pos.	Driver	Points
1	Daniel Rowbottom	536
2	Sam Osborne	428
3	Carl Boardley	359
4	Jack Butel	315
5	Sam Smelt	311
6	Jade Edwards	270
7	Rick Parfitt Jr.	241
8	Nicolas Hamilton	187
9	Jack Mitchell	168
10	Andy Neate	123
11	Paul Rivett	47
12	Glynn Geddie	47
13	Jessica Hawkins	36
14	Andy Wilmot	27
15	Nick Halstead	25
