= 2018 British Touring Car Championship =

61st season of the British Touring Car Championship

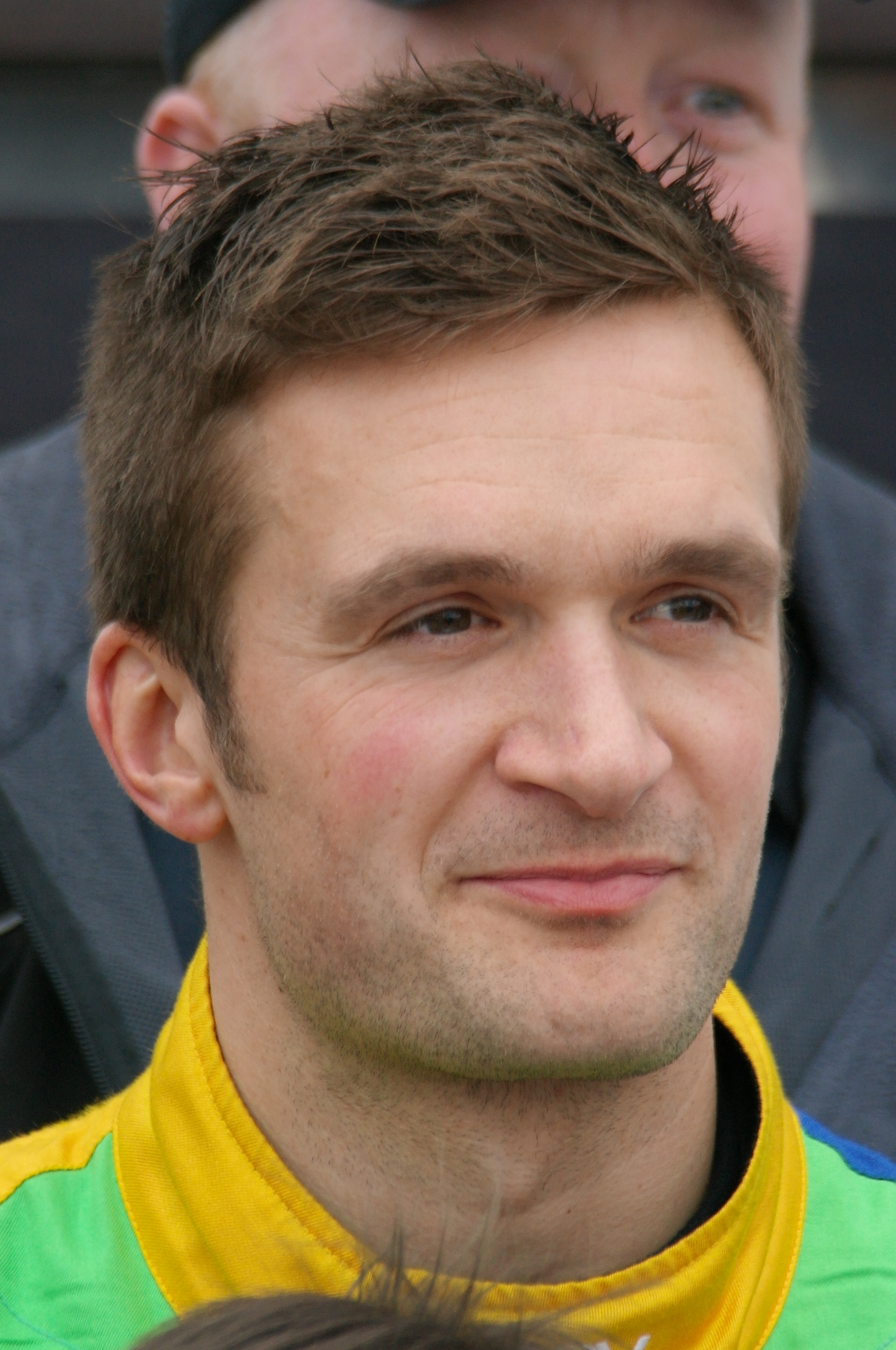
Colin Turkington won his third Drivers' Championship by 12 points.

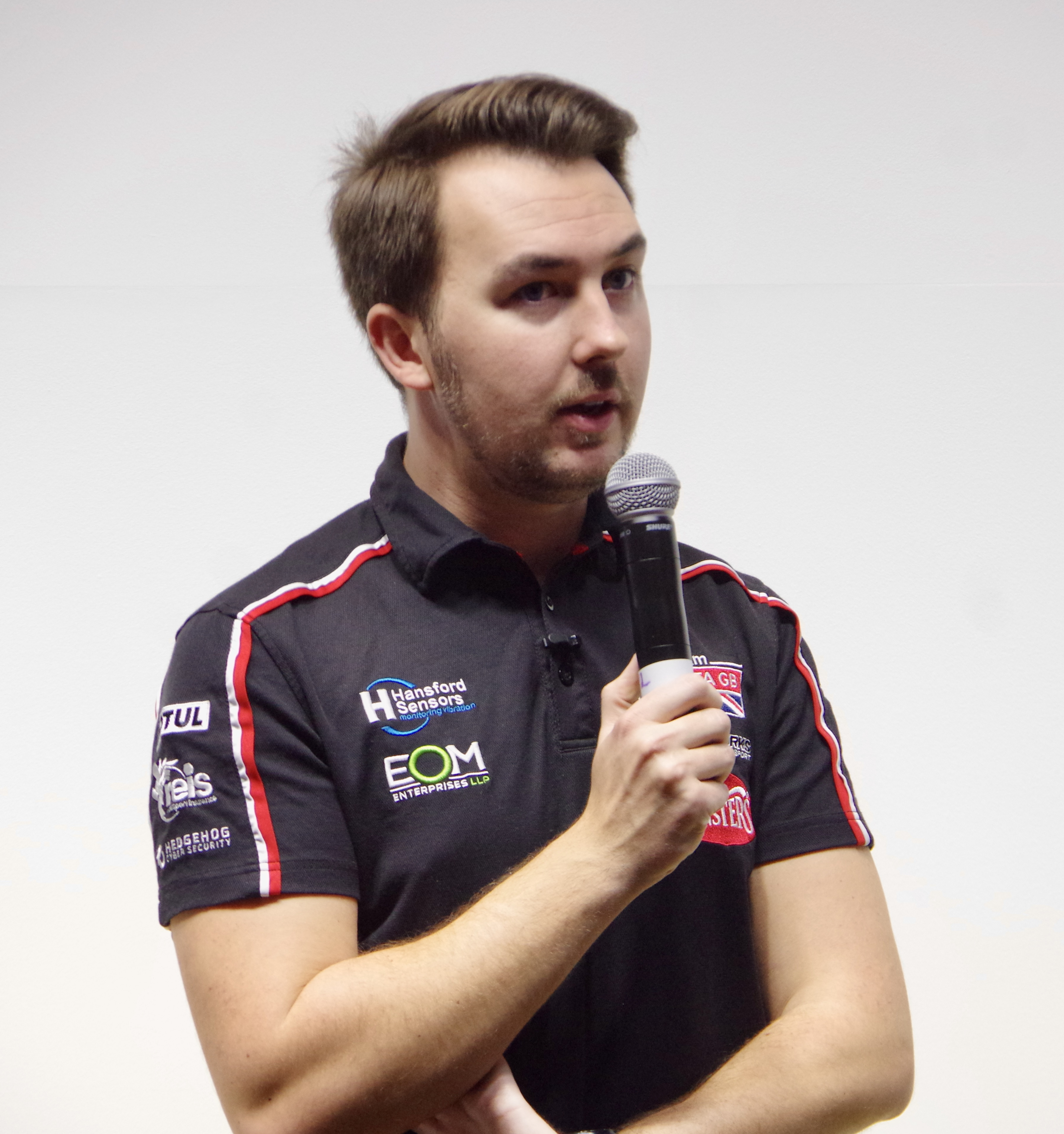
Tom Ingram finished second in the Drivers' Championship.

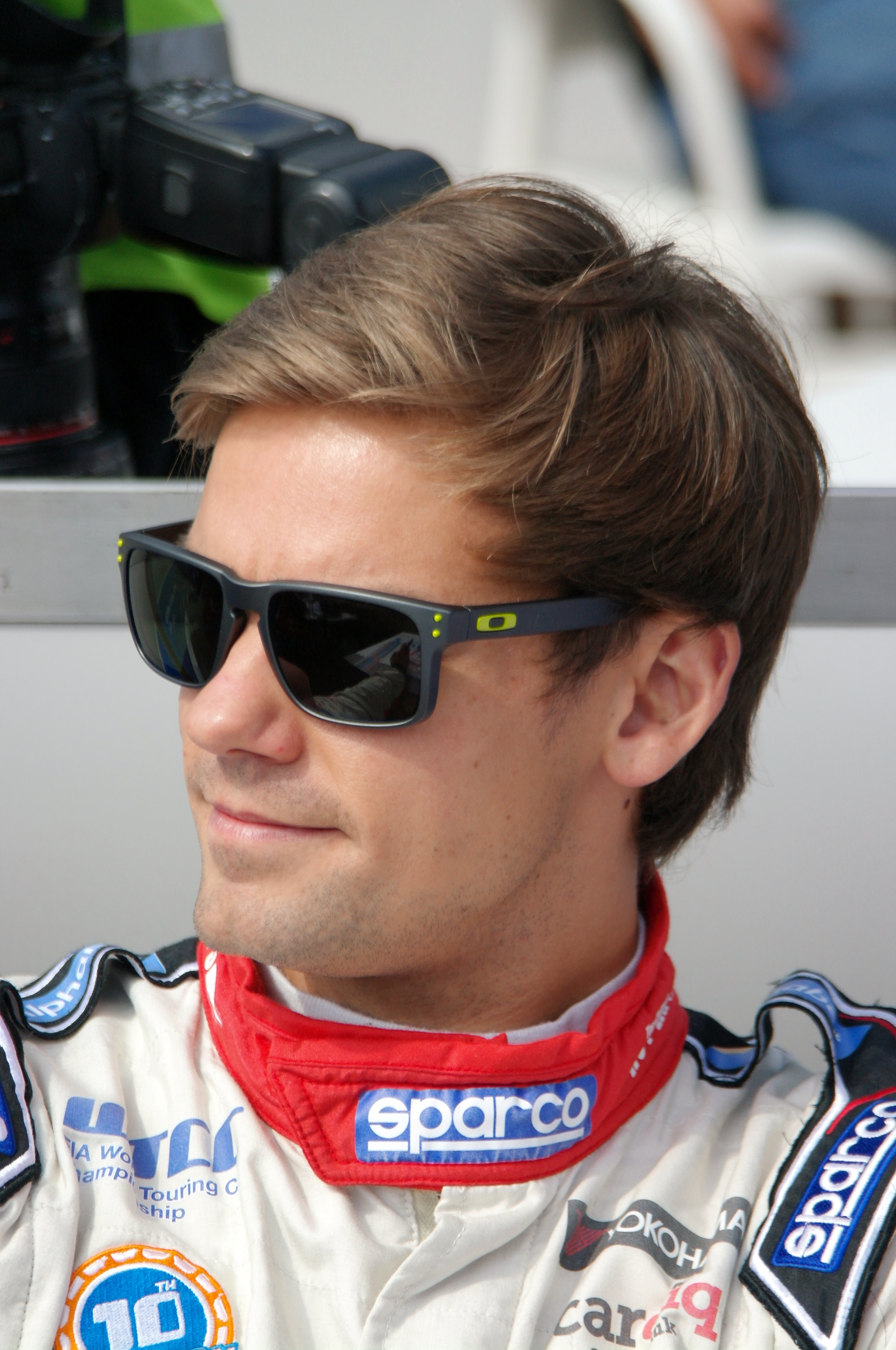
Tom Chilton came third in the Drivers' Championship.

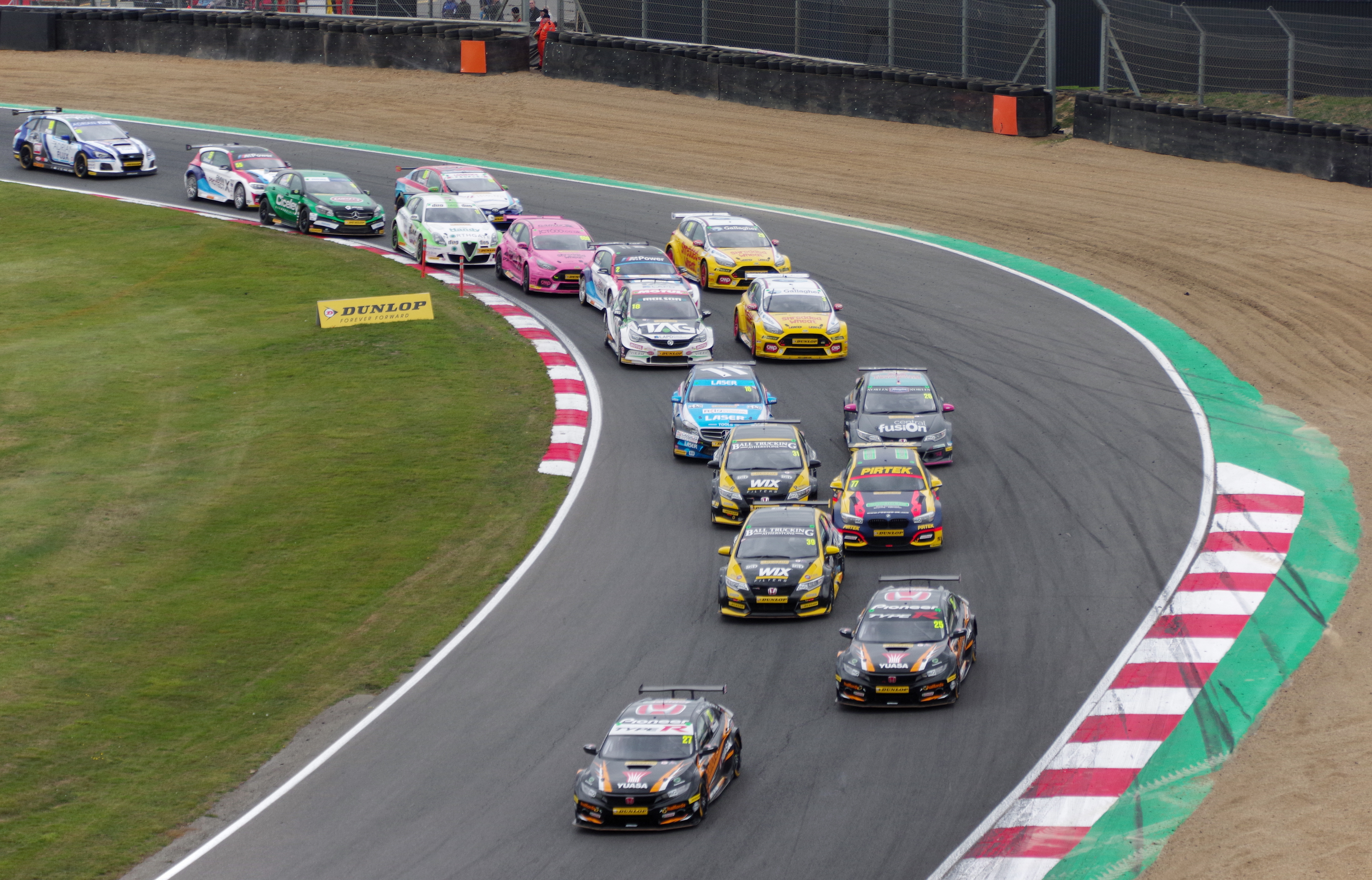
Start of a race at Brands Hatch.

The 2018 Dunlop MSA British Touring Car Championship (commonly abbreviated as BTCC) was a motor racing championship for production-based touring cars held across England and Scotland. It was sponsored by Dunlop. The championship featured a mix of professional motor racing teams and privately funded amateur drivers competing in highly modified versions of family cars which were sold to the general public and conform to the technical regulations for the championship. The 2018 season was the 61st British Touring Car Championship season and the eighth season for cars conforming to the Next Generation Touring Car (NGTC) technical specification. The 2018 season also marked the 60th anniversary since the series’ introduction.

The thirty races held during the season saw seventeen different drivers win a race, setting a new championship record. Six drivers won their first race, but Jason Plato went through a season without winning a race for the first time since his debut in 1997. Colin Turkington claimed his third BTCC title and his first since 2014.

== Teams and drivers ==
Team	Car	Engine	No.	Drivers	Rounds
Constructor Entries
Adrian Flux Subaru Racing	Subaru Levorg GT	Subaru/Mountune	1	(United Kingdom) Ashley Sutton	1
Adrian Flux Subaru Racing	Subaru Levorg GT	Subaru/Swindon	1	(United Kingdom) Ashley Sutton	2–10
Adrian Flux Subaru Racing	Subaru Levorg GT	Subaru/Swindon	99	(United Kingdom) Jason Plato	All
Autoglym Academy Racing	Subaru Levorg GT	Subaru/Swindon	28	(United Kingdom) Josh Price	2–5
Autoglym Academy Racing	Subaru Levorg GT	Subaru/Mountune	28	(United Kingdom) Josh Price	1
Team BMW	BMW 125i M Sport	BMW/Neil Brown	2	(United Kingdom) Colin Turkington	All
Team BMW	BMW 125i M Sport	BMW/Neil Brown	5	(United Kingdom) Rob Collard	1–6
Team BMW	BMW 125i M Sport	BMW/Neil Brown	55	(United Kingdom) Ricky Collard	7–10
BMW Pirtek Racing	BMW 125i M Sport	BMW/Neil Brown	77	(United Kingdom) Andrew Jordan	All
Power Maxed TAG Racing	Vauxhall Astra	TOCA/Swindon	18	(United Kingdom) Senna Proctor	All
Power Maxed TAG Racing	Vauxhall Astra	TOCA/Swindon	66	(United Kingdom) Josh Cook	All
Halfords Yuasa Racing	Honda Civic Type R (FK8)	Honda/Neil Brown	25	(United Kingdom) Matt Neal	All
Halfords Yuasa Racing	Honda Civic Type R (FK8)	Honda/Neil Brown	27	(United Kingdom) Dan Cammish	All
Independent Entries
Team Shredded Wheat Racing with Gallagher	Ford Focus RS	Ford/Mountune	3	(United Kingdom) Tom Chilton	All
Team Shredded Wheat Racing with Gallagher	Ford Focus RS	Ford/Mountune	20	(United Kingdom) James Cole	All
Team GardX Racing with Motorbase	Ford Focus RS	Ford/Mountune	600	(United Kingdom) Sam Tordoff	All
AmD with AutoAid/RCIB Insurance Racing	MG6 GT	TOCA/Swindon	6	(United Kingdom) Rory Butcher	All
AmD with AutoAid/RCIB Insurance Racing	MG6 GT	TOCA/Swindon	10	(United Kingdom) Ant Whorton-Eales	6
AmD with AutoAid/RCIB Insurance Racing	MG6 GT	TOCA/Swindon	12	(United Kingdom) Tom Boardman	1–5
AmD with AutoAid/RCIB Insurance Racing	MG6 GT	TOCA/Swindon	41	(United Kingdom) Glynn Geddie	7–8
AmD with AutoAid/RCIB Insurance Racing	MG6 GT	TOCA/Swindon	54	(United Kingdom) Josh Caygill	9–10
AmD with Cobra Exhausts	Audi S3 Saloon	TOCA/Swindon	23	(United Kingdom) Sam Smelt	All
AmD with Cobra Exhausts	Audi S3 Saloon	TOCA/Swindon	48	(United Kingdom) Ollie Jackson	All
DUO Motorsport with HMS Racing	Alfa Romeo Giulietta	TOCA/Swindon	11	(United Kingdom) Rob Austin	All
BTC Norlin Racing	Honda Civic Type R (FK2)	TOCA/Swindon	14	(United Kingdom) James Nash	1–3
BTC Norlin Racing	Honda Civic Type R (FK2)	TOCA/Swindon	22	(United Kingdom) Chris Smiley	All
BTC Norlin Racing	Honda Civic Type R (FK2)	TOCA/Swindon	26	(United Kingdom) Daniel Lloyd	4–10
Ciceley Motorsport	Mercedes-Benz A-Class	TOCA/Swindon	15	(United Kingdom) Tom Oliphant	All
Mac Tools with Ciceley Motorsport	Mercedes-Benz A-Class	TOCA/Swindon	33	(United Kingdom) Adam Morgan	All
Laser Tools Racing	Mercedes-Benz A-Class	TOCA/Swindon	16	(United Kingdom) Aiden Moffat	All
Trade Price Cars with Brisky Racing	Volkswagen CC	TOCA/Swindon	17	(United Kingdom) Daniel Welch	6
Trade Price Cars with Brisky Racing	Volkswagen CC	TOCA/Swindon	21	(United Kingdom) Mike Bushell	All
Trade Price Cars with Brisky Racing	Volkswagen CC	TOCA/Swindon	24	(United Kingdom) Jake Hill	1–5
Trade Price Cars with Brisky Racing	Volkswagen CC	TOCA/Swindon	43	(United Kingdom) Ollie Pidgley	7–10
Team HARD. with Trade Price Cars	Volkswagen CC	TOCA/Swindon	19	(United Kingdom) Bobby Thompson	All
Team HARD. with Trade Price Cars	Volkswagen CC	TOCA/Swindon	32	(United Kingdom) Ethan Hammerton	9–10
Team HARD. with Trade Price Cars	Volkswagen CC	TOCA/Swindon	42	(United Kingdom) Carl Boardley	8
Team HARD. with Trade Price Cars	Volkswagen CC	TOCA/Swindon	44	(United Kingdom) Michael Caine	1–7
WIX Racing with Eurotech	Honda Civic Type R (FK2)	Honda/Neil Brown	31	(United Kingdom) Jack Goff	All
WIX Racing with Eurotech	Honda Civic Type R (FK2)	Honda/Neil Brown	39	(United Kingdom) Brett Smith	All
Team Parker Racing	BMW 125i M Sport	BMW/Neil Brown	60	(United Kingdom) Stephen Jelley	All
Speedworks Motorsport	Toyota Avensis	TOCA/Swindon	80	(United Kingdom) Tom Ingram	All
Simpson Racing (Note: Team run by Eurotech Racing for rounds 1-7.)	Honda Civic Type R (FK2)	Honda/Neil Brown	303	(United Kingdom) Matt Simpson	All

Key
Eligible for the Jack Sears Trophy for drivers yet to record an overall podium finish or Jack Sears Trophy championship at the start of the season.

=== Driver changes ===
Changed teams

- Matt Simpson moved from Halford Yuasa Racing to Eurotech Racing.
- Tom Chilton moved from Power Maxed Racing to Motorbase Performance.
- Josh Cook moved from Triple Eight Racing back to Power Maxed Racing.
- James Cole moved from Team BMR to Motorbase Performance.
- Rory Butcher moved from Motorbase Performance to AmDTuning.com.

Entering/re-entering BTCC

- 2017 VW Cup champion Bobby Thompson will make his series début, with Team HARD.
- 2014 & 2017 Renault UK Clio Cup champion Mike Bushell will return to the series with Team HARD, having last raced in the championship in 2015.
- Michael Caine will return to series with Team HARD Brisky Racing, having last raced with the team in 2016.
- 2017 British F4 driver Sam Smelt will make his debut in the series with AmDTuning.com.
- 2015 Ginetta GT4 Supercup champion Tom Oliphant will make his series debut, with Ciceley Motorsport.
- 2016 runner-up Sam Tordoff returned to the series after a year racing in the British GT Championship, driving a third car for Motorbase Performance under the GardX Racing banner.
- 2015–16 Porsche Carrera Cup Great Britain champion Dan Cammish, will make his debut in the series with Halfords Yuasa Racing.
- Former race winner Tom Boardman will return to the series with AmDTuning.com, having last raced in 2011.

Leaving BTCC

- Árón Taylor-Smith announced on 27 November 2017 that he would be stepping away from the series to pursue a career in GT Racing.
- Dave Newsham announced on 9 January 2018 that he would retire from the BTCC to focus on his sons racing.
- Gordon Shedden announced on 22 January 2018 that he would be leaving the BTCC, eventually joining Team WRT to race in the World Touring Car Cup.
- Mat Jackson left the series after splitting with Motorbase Performance and failing to secure a vacant seat with another team.
- Stewart Lines and Maximum Motorsport left the series, having sold their car and TBL to Ciceley Motorsport.
- Michael Epps will leave the series and join the 2018 Renault UK Clio Cup.
- Jeff Smith will miss the 2018 season as he continues to recover from injuries sustained in his 2017 crash.
- Ant Whorton-Eales left AmDTuning.com and switched to the Mini Challenge UK driving for JamSport.
- Unable to secure drives, Will Burns and Martin Depper both left the series.

=== Team changes ===
- Handy Motorsport will change its name to HMS Racing and also switch to running the Alfa Romeo Giulietta, having run the Toyota Avensis, since their début in 2014.
- Team HARD will expand from a three-car to a four-car squad.
- Eurotech Racing will expand from a two-car to a three-car squad.
- BTC Norlin Racing will switch from running the Chevrolet Cruze to run the Honda Civic Type R (FK2).
- Motorbase Performance will switch from running the Ford Focus ST to run the Ford Focus RS.
- AmDTuning.com will expand from a two-car to a four-car squad, after having agreed a deal to run the MG6 GTs, which were previously run by Triple Eight Racing.
- Team Dynamics will switch from running the Honda Civic Type R (FK2) to run the newer Honda Civic Type R (FK8).
- For the first time since 1996, Triple Eight Racing did not field a racing team in the BTCC. The MG6 GT race cars were acquired by AmD. Triple Eight was one of the most successful teams to race in the BTCC, firstly fielding the works Vauxhall team from 1997-2009 in which time the team achieved eight manufacturer titles for Vauxhall (2001-05, 2007-09) and a further title with MG in 2014. The team also won the drivers championship in 2001-04, 2007-08. The team officially folded in November 2018.

== Race calendar ==
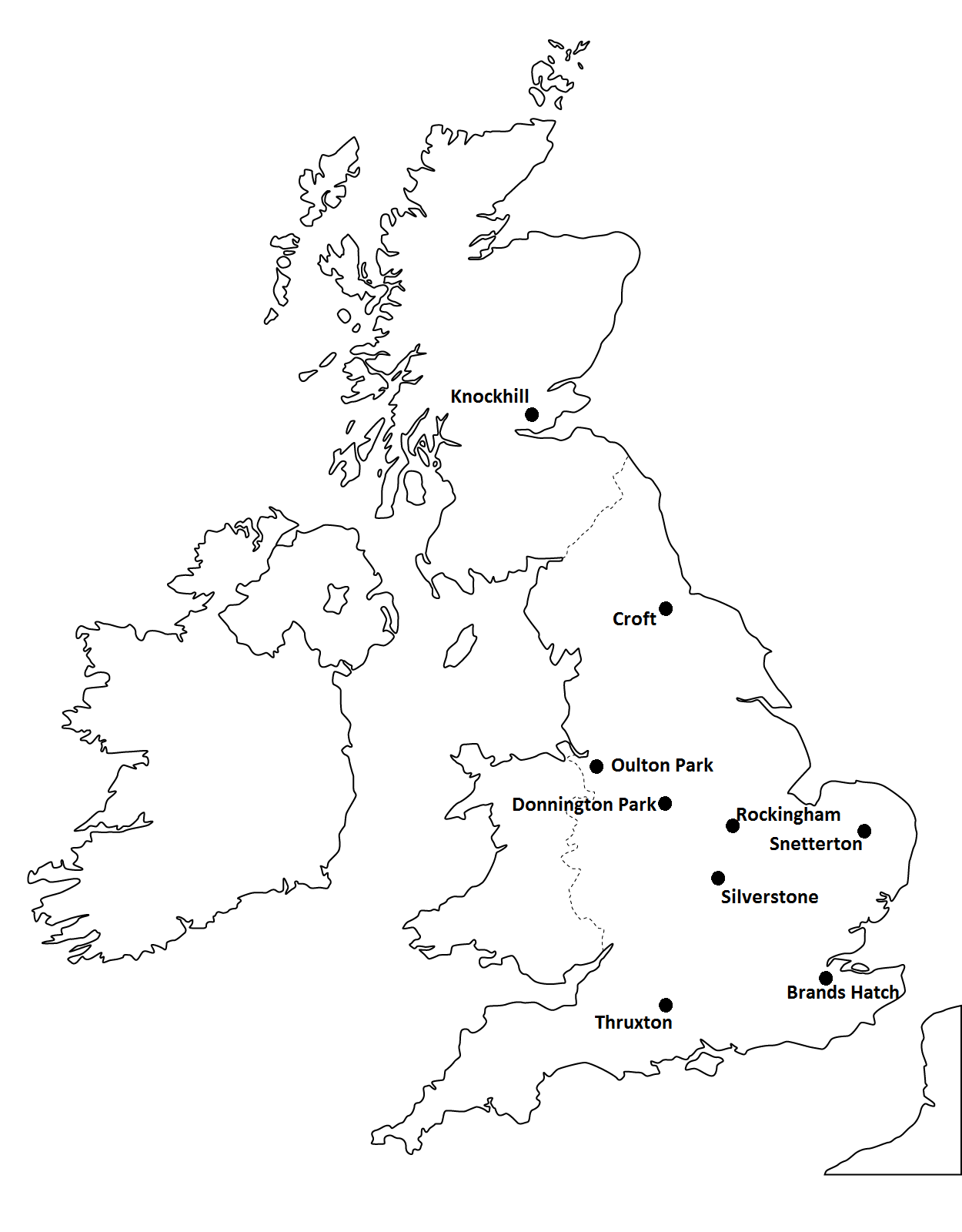
Circuit locations for the 2018 season

The championship calendar was announced by the championship organisers on 26 May 2017. All the circuits from the 2017 season will host rounds again with the only change being the rounds at Rockingham Motor Speedway and Knockhill Racing Circuit switching places. In October 2017, the BTCC bosses announced that Snetterton Motor Racing Circuit will play host to a special extended race this season as part of the series’ 60th anniversary celebrations.

Round		Circuit	Date
1	R1	Brands Hatch (Indy Circuit, Kent)	8 April
1	R2	Brands Hatch (Indy Circuit, Kent)	8 April
1	R3	Brands Hatch (Indy Circuit, Kent)	8 April
2	R4	Donington Park (National Circuit, Leicestershire)	29 April
2	R5	Donington Park (National Circuit, Leicestershire)	29 April
2	R6	Donington Park (National Circuit, Leicestershire)	29 April
3	R7	Thruxton Circuit (Hampshire)	20 May
3	R8	Thruxton Circuit (Hampshire)	20 May
3	R9	Thruxton Circuit (Hampshire)	20 May
4	R10	Oulton Park (Island Circuit, Cheshire)	10 June
4	R11	Oulton Park (Island Circuit, Cheshire)	10 June
4	R12	Oulton Park (Island Circuit, Cheshire)	10 June
5	R13	Croft Circuit (North Yorkshire)	24 June
5	R14	Croft Circuit (North Yorkshire)	24 June
5	R15	Croft Circuit (North Yorkshire)	24 June
6	R16	Snetterton Motor Racing Circuit (300 Circuit, Norfolk)	29 July
6	R17	Snetterton Motor Racing Circuit (300 Circuit, Norfolk)	29 July
6	R18	Snetterton Motor Racing Circuit (300 Circuit, Norfolk)	29 July
7	R19	Rockingham Motor Speedway (International Super Sports Car Circuit, Northamptonshire)	12 August
7	R20	Rockingham Motor Speedway (International Super Sports Car Circuit, Northamptonshire)	12 August
7	R21	Rockingham Motor Speedway (International Super Sports Car Circuit, Northamptonshire)	12 August
8	R22	Knockhill Racing Circuit (Fife)	26 August
8	R23	Knockhill Racing Circuit (Fife)	26 August
8	R24	Knockhill Racing Circuit (Fife)	26 August
9	R25	Silverstone Circuit (National Circuit, Northamptonshire)	16 September
9	R26	Silverstone Circuit (National Circuit, Northamptonshire)	16 September
9	R27	Silverstone Circuit (National Circuit, Northamptonshire)	16 September
10	R28	Brands Hatch (Grand Prix Circuit, Kent)	30 September
10	R29	Brands Hatch (Grand Prix Circuit, Kent)	30 September
10	R30	Brands Hatch (Grand Prix Circuit, Kent)	30 September

== Results ==
Round		Circuit	Pole position	Fastest lap	Winning driver	Winning team	Winning independent	Winning JST
1	R1	Brands Hatch Indy	Jack Goff	Josh Cook	Jack Goff	WIX Racing with Eurotech	Jack Goff	Dan Cammish
1	R2	Brands Hatch Indy		Senna Proctor	Senna Proctor	Power Maxed TAG Racing	Jake Hill	Jake Hill
1	R3	Brands Hatch Indy		Colin Turkington	Tom Ingram	Speedworks Motorsport	Tom Ingram	Mike Bushell
2	R4	Donington Park	Josh Cook	Tom Chilton	Josh Cook	Power Maxed TAG Racing	Aiden Moffat	Dan Cammish
2	R5	Donington Park		Adam Morgan	Tom Ingram	Speedworks Motorsport	Tom Ingram	Chris Smiley
2	R6	Donington Park		Adam Morgan	Adam Morgan	Mac Tools with Ciceley Motorsport	Adam Morgan	Jake Hill
3	R7	Thruxton Circuit	Matt Neal	Colin Turkington	Matt Neal	Halfords Yuasa Racing	Sam Tordoff	Dan Cammish
3	R8	Thruxton Circuit		Josh Cook	Josh Cook	Power Maxed TAG Racing	Sam Tordoff	Chris Smiley
3	R9	Thruxton Circuit		Tom Ingram	Adam Morgan	Mac Tools with Ciceley Motorsport	Adam Morgan	Chris Smiley
4	R10	Oulton Park	Matt Simpson	Matt Simpson	Matt Simpson	Simpson Racing	Matt Simpson	Matt Simpson
4	R11	Oulton Park		Tom Ingram	Colin Turkington	Team BMW	Tom Chilton	Ollie Jackson
4	R12	Oulton Park		Brett Smith	Rob Collard	Team BMW	Jack Goff	Mike Bushell
5	R13	Croft Circuit	Ashley Sutton	Ashley Sutton	Ashley Sutton	Adrian Flux Subaru Racing	Tom Ingram	Daniel Lloyd
5	R14	Croft Circuit		Colin Turkington	Ashley Sutton	Adrian Flux Subaru Racing	Tom Ingram	Daniel Lloyd
5	R15	Croft Circuit		Daniel Lloyd	Daniel Lloyd	BTC Norlin Racing	Daniel Lloyd	Daniel Lloyd
6	R16	Snetterton Motor Racing Circuit	Jack Goff	Ashley Sutton	Jack Goff	WIX Racing with Eurotech	Jack Goff	Dan Cammish
6	R17	Snetterton Motor Racing Circuit		Tom Ingram	Ashley Sutton	Adrian Flux Subaru Racing	Tom Ingram	Dan Cammish
6	R18	Snetterton Motor Racing Circuit	Jack Goff	Matt Neal	Matt Neal	Halfords Yuasa Racing	Jack Goff	Matt Simpson
7	R19	Rockingham Motor Speedway	Adam Morgan	Josh Cook	Adam Morgan	Mac Tools with Ciceley Motorsport	Adam Morgan	Chris Smiley
7	R20	Rockingham Motor Speedway		Tom Ingram	Ashley Sutton	Adrian Flux Subaru Racing	Adam Morgan	Mike Bushell
7	R21	Rockingham Motor Speedway		Chris Smiley	Chris Smiley	BTC Norlin Racing	Chris Smiley	Chris Smiley
8	R22	Knockhill Racing Circuit	Dan Cammish	Ashley Sutton	Ashley Sutton	Adrian Flux Subaru Racing	Tom Ingram	Dan Cammish
8	R23	Knockhill Racing Circuit		Josh Cook	Andrew Jordan	BMW Team Pirtek	Adam Morgan	Dan Cammish
8	R24	Knockhill Racing Circuit		Colin Turkington	Tom Chilton	Team Shredded Wheat Racing with Gallagher	Tom Chilton	Rory Butcher
9	R25	Silverstone Circuit	Sam Tordoff	Tom Chilton	Sam Tordoff	Team GardX Racing with Motorbase	Sam Tordoff	Ricky Collard
9	R26	Silverstone Circuit		Tom Ingram	Tom Ingram	Speedworks Motorsport	Tom Ingram	Ricky Collard
9	R27	Silverstone Circuit		Tom Chilton	Aiden Moffat	Laser Tools Racing	Aiden Moffat	Dan Cammish
10	R28	Brands Hatch GP	Brett Smith	Matt Neal	Dan Cammish	Halfords Yuasa Racing	Brett Smith	Dan Cammish
10	R29	Brands Hatch GP		Tom Oliphant	Dan Cammish	Halfords Yuasa Racing	Tom Ingram	Dan Cammish
10	R30	Brands Hatch GP		Sam Tordoff	Ashley Sutton	Adrian Flux Subaru Racing	Rob Austin	Chris Smiley

== Championship standings ==
Points system
1st	2nd	3rd	4th	5th	6th	7th	8th	9th	10th	11th	12th	13th	14th	15th	R1 PP	Fastest lap	Lead a lap
20	17	15	13	11	10	9	8	7	6	5	4	3	2	1	1	1	1

Notes

- No driver may collect more than one point for leading a lap per race regardless of how many laps they lead.
- A special 60 mile race 3 at Snetterton with standalone qualifying, no ballast and double points

=== Drivers' Championship ===
(key)

Pos.	Driver	BHI			DON			THR			OUL			CRO			SNE			ROC			KNO			SIL			BHGP			Pts
1	Colin Turkington	2	27	9	10	Ret	21	2	2*	5	6	1*	3	5	3	5	15	Ret	6	7	5	2	2	4*	2	8	8	3	12	22	23	304
2	Tom Ingram	4	11*	1*	14	1*	8	Ret	12	7	15	10	6	3	2*	9	Ret	3	3	Ret	3	5	6	DSQ	16	15	1*	2	14	4	5	292
3	Tom Chilton	5	28	27	29	10	9	5	9	11	2	3*	7	15	6	2	13	11	5	3	10	Ret	12	6	1*	2	13	6	9	6	4	266
4	Ashley Sutton	7	12	4	12	8	6*	15	11	20	21	23	13	1*	1*	7	2	1*	20	2	1*	17	1*	DSQ	8	11	27	12	Ret	8	1*	256
5	Andrew Jordan	3	21*	17	21	18	5	6	5	DNS	3	4	2	10	5	6	12	9	4	15	13	Ret	4	1*	3	Ret	22	9	8	3	9	247
6	Josh Cook	NC	15	10	1*	7	2	9	1*	6	17	27	11	7	Ret	18	4	2	7	Ret	12	12	5	2	6	Ret	12	4	22	10	2*	246
7	Adam Morgan	6	13	2	23	5	1*	14	7	1*	18	11	5	Ret	19	12	10	Ret	Ret	1*	2	8	9	5	4	6	2	17	19	Ret	11	232
8	Jack Goff	1*	10*	8	13	3	23	13	8	2	8	8	4	21	18	Ret	1*	17	2*	13	15	19	15	8	9	4	6	22	4	Ret	18	228
9	Matt Neal	Ret	29	12	6	16	7	1*	3	8	5	2	14	9	7	4	14	21	1*	18	14	15	Ret	17	15	Ret	14	7	2	2	21	223
10	Dan Cammish	8	16	11	2	4*	Ret	3	26	13	13	12	22	19	11	10	3	4	14	5	21	10	3*	3	17	10	15	8	1*	1*	17	218
11	Sam Tordoff	26	18	13	Ret	11	Ret	4	4	4	4	Ret	DNS	4	4	8	5	6	Ret	Ret	18	4	17	11	5	1*	3*	14	11	14	6	202
12	Senna Proctor	27	1*	15	8	22	Ret	7	6	3	28	16	12	11	8	3	NC	7	12	12	4	14	19	16	Ret	18	10	11	5	7	7	170
13	Chris Smiley	10	17	16	7	2*	NC	10	10	9	12	18	Ret	17	12	Ret	7	5	Ret	4	7	1*	8	10	11	25	18	Ret	28	12	8	152
14	Rob Austin	Ret	6	3*	15	21	11	16	13	16	10	7	Ret	Ret	15	Ret	6	Ret	13	11	Ret	18	14	9	13	26	9	5	15	9	3*	126
15	Matt Simpson	Ret	7	7	31	25	14	12	14	12	1*	DNS	DNS	22	17	15	Ret	19	8	10	9	3	21	20	Ret	5	5	25	20	Ret	22	120
16	Aiden Moffat	14	5*	21	3	15	3	18	15	15	16	Ret	20	Ret	16	17	16	13	NC	8	Ret	21	18	13	12	14	7	1*	7	5	27	117
17	Rory Butcher	13	9	6	22	9	13	24	19	14	27	14	Ret	13	10	13	Ret	23	Ret	9	8	6	10	7	7	12	16	Ret	23	Ret	24	99
18	Daniel Lloyd										25	17	Ret	8	9	1*	9	15	9	21	16	Ret	25	14	10	16	19	15	6	13	10	87
19	Rob Collard	15	26	Ret	11	13	4	11	16	10	9	6	1*	6	28	11	Ret	Ret	DNS													86
20	Brett Smith	11	20	22	4	14	Ret	8	Ret	Ret	11	19	18	Ret	21	28	11	12	Ret	26	24	Ret	13	19	Ret	13	21	19	3	11	16	70
21	James Cole	9	19	Ret	5	6	Ret	19	Ret	24	7	5	9	12	23	20	17	18	Ret	19	19	Ret	24	18	22	21	28	20	10	16	14	67
22	Tom Oliphant	16	Ret	20	9	12	22	17	Ret	19	20	13	Ret	16	13	14	8	8	Ret	25	17	13	7	Ret	21	9	11	16	13	Ret	20	63
23	Ollie Jackson	12	3	14	19	29	16	25	17	Ret	14	9	21	14	25	22	Ret	Ret	11	16	11	9	16	Ret	Ret	17	25	23	17	15	12	59
24	Mike Bushell	Ret	8	5	27	28	15	21	NC	27	19	15	8	20	22	Ret	Ret	16	Ret	6	6	20	23	NC	24	7	24	13	24	20	15	59
25	Ricky Collard																			17	20	DNS	11	12	23	3	4	10	16	18	13	46
26	Jake Hill	25	2	29	17	23	10	20	18	17	23	21	10	Ret	26	25																29
27	Jason Plato	20	22	19	25	20	18	Ret	Ret	DNS	30	20	Ret	2	14	19	24	Ret	15	23	26	11	26	Ret	19	Ret	17	18	18	17	25	26
28	Bobby Thompson	19	Ret	26	20	24	20	26	20	22	26	26	DNS	24	27	21	18	14	10	24	Ret	7	Ret	NC	20	19	Ret	21	Ret	Ret	19	23
29	Tom Boardman	18	4	18	16	17	Ret	Ret	22	18	24	25	15	26	Ret	23																14
30	Ant Whorton-Eales																23	10	16													6
31	James Nash	17	14	Ret	18	Ret	12	23	21	23																						6
32	Stephen Jelley	22	Ret	23	30	19	17	27	25	21	22	Ret	16	Ret	20	16	20	22	17	14	Ret	16	Ret	Ret	14	Ret	Ret	Ret	21	Ret	Ret	4
33	Glynn Geddie																			22	22	Ret	20	15	18							1
34	Sam Smelt	24	25	25	28	Ret	24	28	24	26	31	Ret	17	25	24	26	22	20	18	Ret	23	Ret	22	Ret	Ret	22	26	23	25	19	26	0
35	Josh Price	23	23	28	26	26	Ret	22	23	Ret	Ret	24	Ret	18	Ret	24																0
36	Michael Caine	21	24	24	24	27	19	Ret	Ret	25	29	22	19	23	NC	27	19	Ret	DNS	20	Ret	Ret										0
37	Daniel Welch																21	Ret	19													0
38	Ollie Pidgley																			Ret	25	22	27	21	NC	20	23	Ret	27	Ret	DNS	0
39	Ethan Hammerton																									24	20	24	Ret	Ret	Ret	0
40	Josh Caygill																									23	NC	Ret	26	21	Ret	0
NC	Carl Boardley																						DSQ	DSQ	DSQ							0
Pos.	Driver	BHI			DON			THR			OUL			CRO			SNE			ROC			KNO			SIL			BHGP			Pts

=== Manufacturers' Championship ===
(key)

Pos.	Manufacturer	BHI			DON			THR			OUL			CRO			SNE			ROC			KNO			SIL			BHGP			Pts
1	BMW / West Surrey Racing	2	21	9	10	4	4	2	2	5	3	1	1	5	3	5	12	9	4	7	5	2	2	1	2	3	4	3	8	3	9	830
1	BMW / West Surrey Racing	3	26	17	11	18	5	6	5	10	6	4	2	6	5	6	15	Ret	6	15	13	Ret	4	4	3	8	8	9	12	18	13	830
2	Honda / Team Dynamics	8	16	11	2	4	7	1	3	8	5	2	14	9	7	4	3	4	1	5	14	10	3	3	15	10	14	7	1	1	17	758
2	Honda / Team Dynamics	Ret	29	12	6	16	Ret	3	26	13	13	12	22	19	11	10	14	21	14	18	21	15	Ret	17	17	Ret	15	8	2	2	21	758
3	Vauxhall / Power Maxed Racing	27	1	10	1	7	2	7	1	3	17	16	11	7	8	3	4	2	7	12	4	12	5	2	6	18	10	4	5	7	2	741
3	Vauxhall / Power Maxed Racing	NC	15	15	8	22	Ret	9	5	6	28	26	12	11	Ret	18	NC	7	12	Ret	12	14	19	16	Ret	Ret	12	11	22	10	7	741
4	Subaru / Team BMR	7	12	4	12	8	6	15	11	20	21	20	13	1	1	7	2	1	15	2	1	11	1	Ret	8	11	17	12	18	8	1	553
4	Subaru / Team BMR	20	22	19	25	20	18	22	23	Ret	30	23	Ret	2	14	19	24	Ret	20	23	26	17	26	DSQ	19	Ret	27	18	Ret	17	25	553
Pos.	Manufacturer	BHI			DON			THR			OUL			CRO			SNE			ROC			KNO			SIL			BHGP			Pts

=== Teams' Championship ===
(key)

Pos.	Team	BHI			DON			THR			OUL			CRO			SNE			ROC			KNO			SIL			BHGP			Pts
1	Team BMW	2	26	9	10	13	4	2	2	5	6	1	1	5	3	5	15	Ret	6	7	5	2	2	4	2	3	4	3	12	18	13	428
1	Team BMW	15	27	Ret	11	Ret	21	11	16	10	9	6	3	6	28	11	Ret	Ret	DNS	17	20	DNS	11	12	23	8	8	10	16	22	23	428
2	Halfords Yuasa Racing	8	16	11	2	4	7	1	3	8	5	2	14	9	7	4	3	4	1	5	14	10	3	3	15	10	14	7	1	1	17	409
2	Halfords Yuasa Racing	Ret	29	12	6	16	7	3	26	13	13	12	22	19	11	10	14	21	14	18	21	15	Ret	17	17	Ret	15	8	2	2	21	409
3	Power Maxed TAG Racing	27	1	10	1	7	2	9	1	6	17	16	11	7	8	3	4	2	7	12	4	12	5	2	6	18	10	4	5	7	2	409
3	Power Maxed TAG Racing	NC	15	15	8	22	Ret	9	6	6	28	27	12	11	Ret	18	NC	7	12	Ret	12	14	19	16	Ret	Ret	12	11	22	10	7	409
4	Team Shredded Wheat Racing with Gallagher	5	19	27	5	6	9	5	9	11	2	3	7	12	6	2	13	11	5	3	10	Ret	12	6	1	2	13	6	9	6	4	318
4	Team Shredded Wheat Racing with Gallagher	9	28	Ret	29	10	Ret	19	Ret	24	7	5	9	15	23	20	17	18	Ret	19	19	Ret	24	18	22	21	28	20	10	16	14	318
5	Speedworks Motorsport	4	11	1	14	1	8	Ret	12	7	15	10	6	3	2	9	Ret	3	3	Ret	3	5	6	DSQ	16	15	1	2	14	4	5	282
6	WIX Racing with Eurotech	1	10	8	4	3	23	8	8	2	8	8	4	21	18	28	1	12	2	13	15	19	13	8	9	4	6	19	3	11	16	277
6	WIX Racing with Eurotech	11	20	22	13	14	Ret	13	Ret	Ret	11	19	18	Ret	21	Ret	11	17	Ret	26	24	Ret	15	19	Ret	13	21	22	4	Ret	19	277
7	BMW Pirtek Racing	3	21	17	21	18	5	6	5	DNS	3	4	2	10	5	6	12	9	4	15	13	Ret	4	1	3	Ret	22	9	8	3	9	245
7	Mac Tools with Ciceley Motorsport	6	13	2	23	5	1	14	7	1	18	11	5	Ret	19	12	10	Ret	Ret	1	2	8	9	5	4	6	2	17	19	Ret	11	226
9	BTC Norlin Racing	10	14	16	7	2	12	10	10	9	12	17	Ret	8	9	1	7	5	9	4	7	1	8	10	10	16	18	15	6	12	8	223
9	BTC Norlin Racing	17	17	Ret	18	Ret	NC	23	21	23	15	18	Ret	17	12	Ret	9	15	Ret	21	16	Ret	25	14	11	25	19	Ret	28	13	10	223
10	Adrian Flux Subaru Racing	7	12	4	12	8	6	15	11	20	21	20	13	1	1	7	2	1	15	2	1	11	1	Ret	8	11	17	12	18	8	1	201
10	Adrian Flux Subaru Racing	20	22	19	25	20	18	Ret	Ret	DNS	30	23	Ret	2	14	19	24	Ret	20	23	26	17	26	DSQ	19	Ret	27	18	Ret	17	25	201
11	Team GardX Racing with Motorbase	26	18	13	Ret	11	Ret	4	4	4	4	Ret	DNS	4	4	8	5	6	Ret	Ret	18	4	17	11	5	1	3	14	11	14	6	198
12	AmD with Autoaid/RCIB Insurance Racing	13	4	6	16	6	13	24	19	14	24	14	15	13	10	13	23	10	16	9	8	6	10	7	7	12	16	Ret	23	21	24	120
12	AmD with Autoaid/RCIB Insurance Racing	18	9	18	22	17	Ret	Ret	22	18	27	25	Ret	26	Ret	23	Ret	23	Ret	22	22	Ret	20	15	18	23	Ret	Ret	26	Ret	Ret	120
13	Laser Tools Racing	14	5	21	3	15	3	18	15	15	16	Ret	20	Ret	16	17	16	13	NC	8	Ret	21	18	13	12	14	7	1	7	5	27	115
14	DUO Motorsport with HMS Racing	Ret	6	3	15	21	11	16	13	16	10	7	Ret	Ret	15	Ret	6	Ret	13	11	Ret	18	14	9	13	26	9	5	15	9	3	114
15	Simpson Racing	Ret	7	7	31	25	14	12	14	12	1	DNS	DNS	22	17	15	Ret	19	8	10	9	3	21	20	Ret	5	5	25	20	Ret	22	107
12	Trade Price Cars with Brisky Racing	25	2	5	17	23	10	20	18	17	19	15	8	20	22	25	21	16	19	6	6	20	23	21	24	7	23	13	24	20	15	91
12	Trade Price Cars with Brisky Racing	Ret	8	29	27	28	15	21	Ret	27	23	21	10	Ret	26	Ret	Ret	Ret	Ret	Ret	25	22	27	NC	NC	20	24	Ret	27	Ret	DNS	91
17	Ciceley Motorsport	16	Ret	20	9	12	22	17	Ret	19	20	13	Ret	16	13	14	8	8	Ret	25	17	13	7	Ret	21	9	11	16	13	Ret	20	62
18	AmD with Cobra Exhausts	12	3	14	19	29	16	25	17	26	14	9	17	14	24	22	22	20	11	16	11	9	16	Ret	Ret	17	25	23	17	15	12	39
18	AmD with Cobra Exhausts	24	25	25	28	Ret	24	28	24	26	31	Ret	17	25	25	26	Ret	Ret	18	Ret	23	Ret	22	Ret	Ret	22	26	23	25	19	26	39
19	Autoglym Academy Racing	23	23	28	26	26	Ret	22	23	Ret	Ret	24	Ret	18	Ret	24																0
20	Team Parker Racing	22	Ret	23	30	19	17	27	25	21	22	Ret	16	Ret	20	16	20	22	17	14	Ret	16	Ret	Ret	14	Ret	Ret	Ret	21	Ret	Ret	-6
21	Team HARD. with Trade Price Cars	19	24	24	20	24	19	26	20	22	26	22	19	23	27	21	18	14	10	20	Ret	7	Ret	NC	20	19	20	21	Ret	Ret	19	-17
21	Team HARD. with Trade Price Cars	21	Ret	26	24	27	20	Ret	Ret	25	29	26	DNS	24	Ret	27	19	Ret	DNS	24	Ret	Ret	DSQ	DSQ	DSQ	24	Ret	24	Ret	Ret	Ret	-17
Pos.	Team	BHI			DON			THR			OUL			CRO			SNE			ROC			KNO			SIL			BHGP			Pts

=== Independents Drivers' Trophy ===
Pos.	Driver	Points
1	Tom Ingram	387
2	Tom Chilton	368
3	Jack Goff	320
4	Adam Morgan	316
5	Sam Tordoff	292
6	Chris Smiley	248
7	Rob Austin	235
8	Aiden Moffat	218
9	Matt Simpson	192
10	Rory Butcher	184
11	Daniel Lloyd	167
12	Tom Oliphant	164
13	James Cole	150
14	Brett Smith	149
15	Ollie Jackson	148
16	Mike Bushell	122
17	Bobby Thompson	70
18	Jake Hill	64
19	Stephen Jelley	62
20	Tom Boardman	49
21	Sam Smelt	27
22	James Nash	26
23	Ant Whorton-Eales	25
24	Michael Caine	18
25	Glynn Geddie	16
26	Daniel Welch	9
27	Ollie Pidgley	5
28	Ethan Hammerton	4
29	Josh Caygill	0
NC	Carl Boardley	0

=== Independent Teams' Trophy ===
Pos.	Team	Points
1	Speedworks Motorsport	397
2	Team Shredded Wheat Racing with Gallagher	388
3	WIX Racing with Eurotech	362
4	BTC Norlin Racing	333
5	Mac Tools with Ciceley Motorsport	330
6	Team GardX Racing with Motorbase	304
7	AmD with Autoaid/RCIB Insurance Racing	255
8	Laser Tools Racing	239
9	DUO Motorsport with HMS Racing	239
10	Trade Price Cars with Brisky Racing	217
11	Simpson Racing	206
12	Ciceley Motorsport	188
13	AmD with Cobra Exhausts	172
14	Team HARD with Trade Price Cars	87
15	Team Parker Racing	86

=== Jack Sears Trophy ===
Pos.	Driver	Points
1	Dan Cammish	444
2	Chris Smiley	358
3	Matt Simpson	309
4	Rory Butcher	309
5	Ollie Jackson	272
6	Tom Oliphant	272
7	Daniel Lloyd	257
8	Mike Bushell	252
9	Brett Smith	245
10	Bobby Thompson	191
11	Sam Smelt	158
12	Jake Hill	147
13	Ricky Collard	140
14	Michael Caine	101
15	Josh Price	71
16	Glynn Geddie	41
17	Ant Whorton-Eales	39
18	Ollie Pidgley	35
19	Daniel Welch	24
20	Ethan Hammerton	20
21	Josh Caygill	15
NC	Carl Boardley	0
