= Matt Simpson (racing driver) =

British racing driver (born 1981)

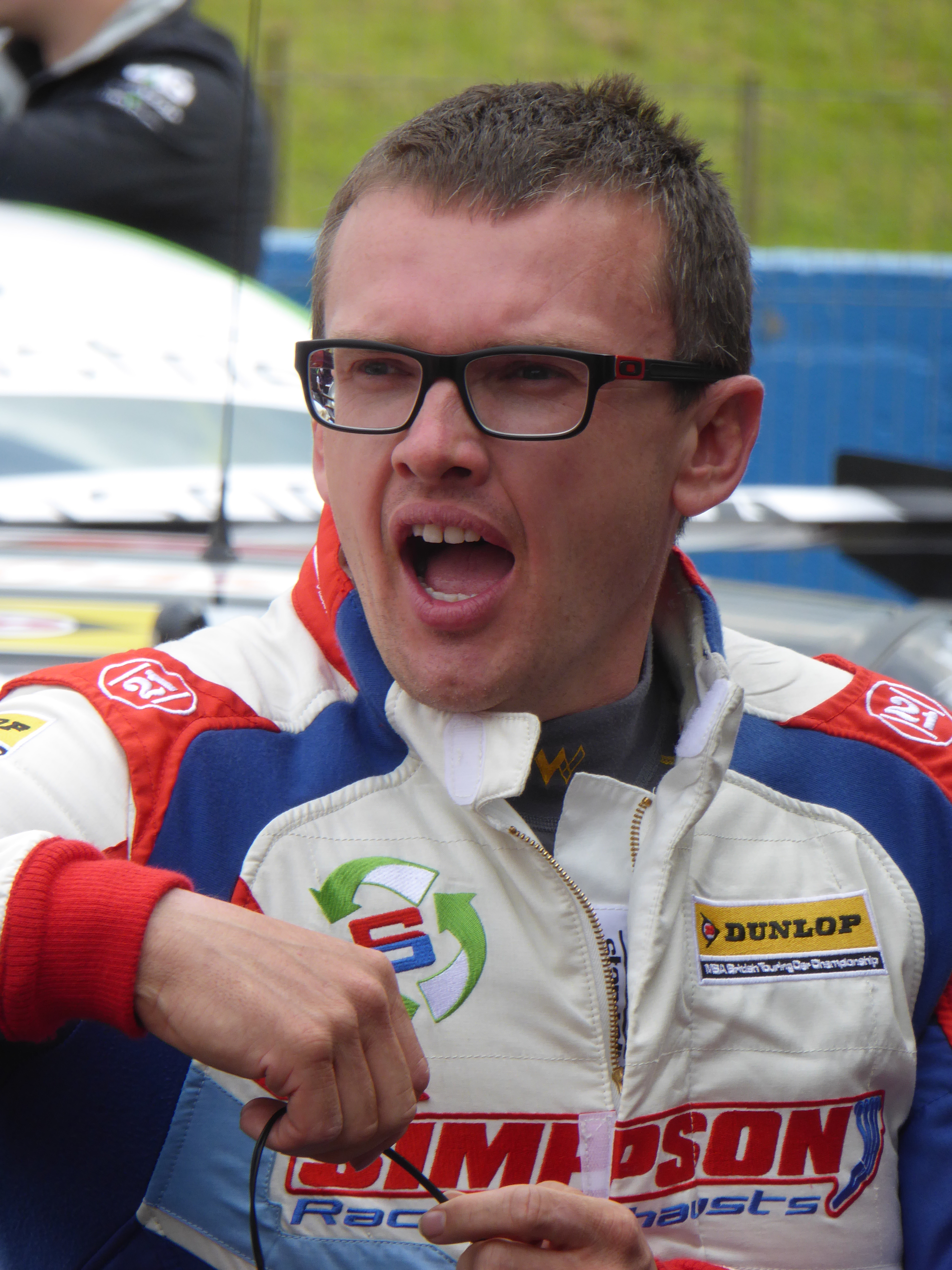
- Simpson in 2017
- Nationality: (United Kingdom) British
- Born: Matthew Simpson; 29 August 1981 (age 45) Slough, Berkshire, UK

British Touring Car Championship career
- Debut season: 2016
- Current team: Simpson Racing
- Car number: 303
- Former teams: Speedworks Motorsport, Team Dynamics, Eurotech Racing
- Starts: 117
- Wins: 1
- Podiums: 2
- Poles: 1
- Fastest laps: 1
- Best finish: 15th in 2018

Previous series
- 2013–15 2005–12 2005–12: Quaife Intermarque Championship; National Hot Rod World Series; National Hot Rod European Series

Championship titles
- 2013–14 2009, 11: Quaife Intermarque Championship; National Hot Rod European Championship

Matthew Simpson (born 29 August 1981) is a British racing driver who formerly competed in the British Touring Car Championship. He debuted in 2016, after being double champion in the Quaife Intermarque Championship in 2013 and 2014.

== Racing career ==
Simpson began his career in National Hot Rod in 2005, before graduating to the National Hot Rod European Series in 2006. He also raced in the National Hot Rod World Series that year. He went on to win the European series two times in 2009 and 2011, as well as finishing runner-up in the World series in 2008 and 2009. In 2013, he switched to the Quaife Intermarque Championship, winning back-to-back titles in 2013 and 2014. In November 2015, it was announced that Simpson would make his British Touring Car Championship debut with Speedworks Motorsport driving a Honda Civic Type R.

== Racing record ==
=== Complete British Touring Car Championship results ===
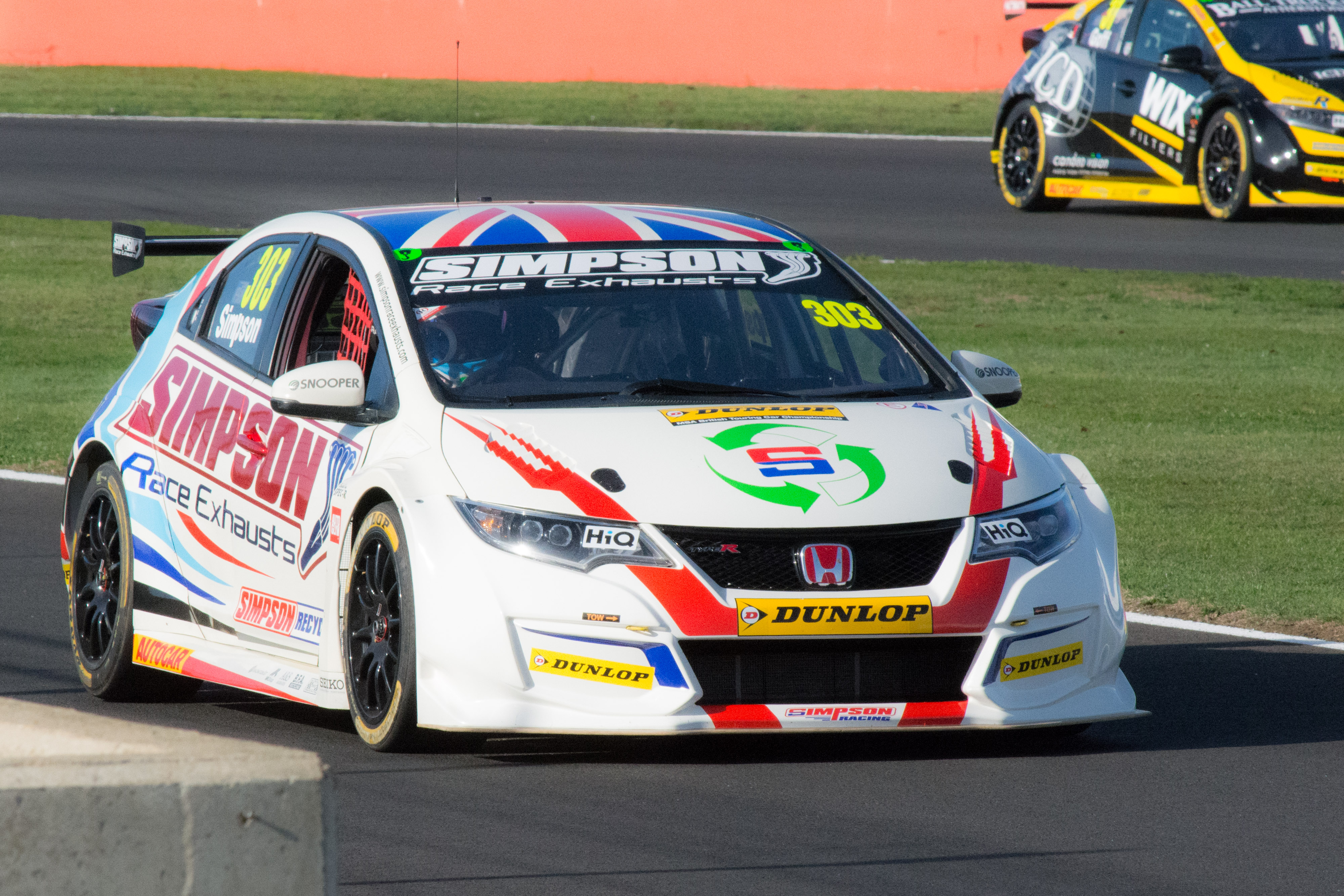
Simpson driving the Simpson Racing Honda Civic at Silverstone during the 2018 British Touring Car Championship season.

(key) (Races in bold indicate pole position – 1 point awarded just in first race; races in italics indicate fastest lap – 1 point awarded all races; * signifies that driver led race for at least one lap – 1 point given all races)

Year	Team	Car	1	2	3	4	5	6	7	8	9	10	11	12	13	14	15	16	17	18	19	20	21	22	23	24	25	26	27	28	29	30	DC	Pts
2016	Speedworks Motorsport	Honda Civic Type R	BRH; 1; 17	BRH; 2; 18	BRH; 3; 15	DON; 1 Ret	DON; 2; 22	DON; 3; 23	THR; 1; 13	THR; 2; 13	THR; 3 Ret	OUL; 1; 22	OUL; 2 Ret	OUL; 3; 18	CRO; 1; 22	CRO; 2; 16	CRO; 3 Ret	SNE; 1; 22	SNE; 2; 17	SNE; 3 Ret	KNO; 1 Ret	KNO; 2; 19	KNO; 3; 17	ROC; 1 Ret	ROC; 2 DNS	ROC; 3; 20	SIL; 1; 20	SIL; 2 Ret	SIL; 3; 24	BRH; 1; 20	BRH; 2; 19	BRH; 3; 18	29th	1
2017	Simpson Racing	Honda Civic Type R	BRH; 1; 11	BRH; 2; 20	BRH; 3 Ret	DON; 1; 18	DON; 2 Ret	DON; 3; 20	THR; 1; 13	THR; 2; 11	THR; 3; 16	OUL; 1 Ret	OUL; 2; 25	OUL; 3; 14	CRO; 1 Ret	CRO; 2; 17	CRO; 3; 18	SNE; 1; 12	SNE; 2; 13	SNE; 3 Ret	KNO; 1; 22	KNO; 2; 13	KNO; 3; 14	ROC; 1; 28	ROC; 2 Ret	ROC; 3; 18	SIL; 1; 25	SIL; 2; 24	SIL; 3; 20	BRH; 1; 13	BRH; 2; 20	BRH; 3; 24	24th	30
2018	Simpson Racing	Honda Civic Type R (FK2)	BRH; 1 Ret	BRH; 2; 7	BRH; 3; 7	DON; 1; 31	DON; 2; 25	DON; 3; 14	THR; 1; 12	THR; 2; 14	THR; 3; 12	**OUL**; **1**; 1*	**OUL**; **2** DNS	OUL; 3 DNS	CRO; 1; 22	CRO; 2; 17	CRO; 3; 15	SNE; 1 Ret	SNE; 2; 19	SNE; 3; 8	ROC; 1; 10	ROC; 2; 9	ROC; 3; 3	KNO; 1; 21	KNO; 2; 20	KNO; 3 Ret	SIL; 1; 5	SIL; 2; 5	SIL; 3; 25	BRH; 1; 20	BRH; 2 Ret	BRH; 3; 22	15th	120
2019	Simpson Racing	Honda Civic Type R (FK2)	BRH; 1; 18	BRH; 2 NC	BRH; 3; 21	DON; 1 Ret	DON; 2 Ret	DON; 3 Ret	THR; 1; 15	THR; 2; 21	THR; 3; 19	CRO; 1 NC	CRO; 2; 17	CRO; 3; 25	OUL; 1; 23	OUL; 2; 20	OUL; 3 Ret	SNE; 1; 9	SNE; 2; 9	SNE; 3; 13	THR; 1; 21	THR; 2; 17	THR; 3; 16	KNO; 1; 14	KNO; 2; 12	KNO; 3 Ret	SIL; 1; 13	SIL; 2; 10	SIL; 3 Ret	BRH; 1 Ret	BRH; 2; 27	BRH; 3 Ret	23rd	33
