= Sam Smelt =

British racing driver (born 1996)

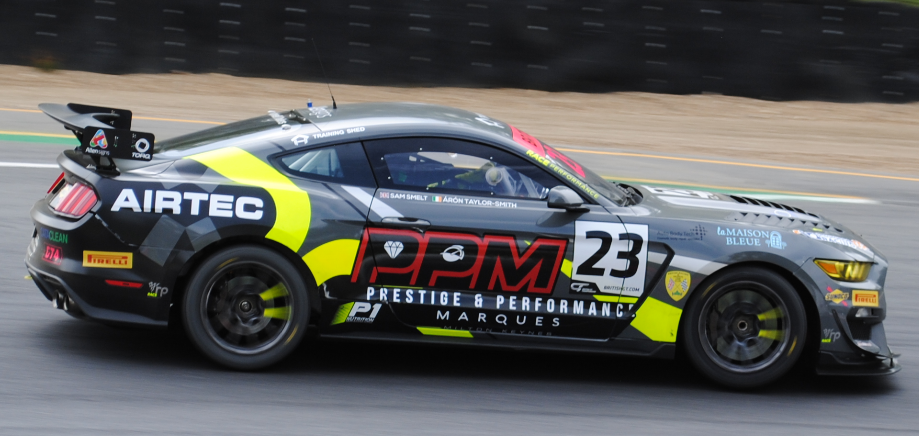
- Sam Smelt's Ford Mustang GT4 at Brands Hatch
- Nationality: (United Kingdom) British
- Born: 23 August 1996 (age 30) Leicester, East Midlands, England

British Touring Car Championship career
- Debut season: 2018
- Current team: Toyota Gazoo Racing UK
- Car number: 23
- Former teams: AmD Essex
- Starts: 60
- Wins: 0
- Poles: 0
- Fastest laps: 0
- Best finish: 24th in 2021

Previous series
- 2017: F4 British Championship; VW Racing Cup

Sam Smelt (born 23 August 1996) is a British racing driver who last competed in the British Touring Car Championship with Toyota Gazoo Racing. This was his second spell in the championship, having last competed in 2018 with AmD Tuning. He previously raced in the VW Racing Cup and F4 British Championship both in 2017 and in karting before that season. He competed in British GT in 2019.

== British GT Championship ==
Smelt drove with ex-BTCC driver Árón Taylor-Smith in a Ford Mustang GT4. They finished 22nd in the championship with only four points, scored at Snetterton.

== Racing record ==
=== Complete British Touring Car Championship results ===
(key) (Races in bold indicate pole position – 1 point awarded just in first race; races in italics indicate fastest lap – 1 point awarded all races; * signifies that driver led race for at least one lap – 1 point given all races)

Year	Team	Car	1	2	3	4	5	6	7	8	9	10	11	12	13	14	15	16	17	18	19	20	21	22	23	24	25	26	27	28	29	30	DC	Points
2018	AmD with Cobra Exhausts	Audi S3 Saloon	BRH; 1; 24	BRH; 2; 25	BRH; 3; 25	DON; 1; 28	DON; 2 Ret	DON; 3; 24	THR; 1; 28	THR; 2; 24	THR; 3; 26	OUL; 1; 31	OUL; 2 Ret	OUL; 3; 17	CRO; 1; 25	CRO; 2; 24	CRO; 3; 26	SNE; 1; 22	SNE; 2; 20	SNE; 3; 18	ROC; 1 Ret	ROC; 2; 23	ROC; 3 Ret	KNO; 1; 22	KNO; 2 Ret	KNO; 3 Ret	SIL; 1; 22	SIL; 2; 26	SIL; 3; 23	BRH; 1; 25	BRH; 2; 19	BRH; 3; 26	34th	0
2021	Toyota Gazoo Racing UK	Toyota Corolla GR Sport	THR; 1; 23	THR; 2; 20	THR; 3; 14	SNE; 1; 29	SNE; 2; 26	SNE; 3 Ret	BRH; 1; 24	BRH; 2; 18	BRH; 3; 23	OUL; 1; 23	OUL; 2; 19	OUL; 3; 18	KNO; 1; 17	KNO; 2; 24	KNO; 3; 24	THR; 1; 26	THR; 2; 22	THR; 3 Ret	CRO; 1; 21	CRO; 2; 18	CRO; 3; 16	SIL; 1 Ret	SIL; 2 Ret	SIL; 3; 20	DON; 1; 21	DON; 2; 22	DON; 3 Ret	BRH; 1; 20	BRH; 2; 13	BRH; 3; 21	24th	5

=== Complete British GT Championship results ===
(key) (Races in bold indicate pole position) (Races in italics indicate fastest lap)

Year	Team	Car	Class	1	2	3	4	5	6	7	8	9	DC	Points
2019	RACE Performance	Ford Mustang GT4	GT4	OUL; 1; 25	OUL; 2; 28	SNE; 1; 25	SNE; 2; 21	SIL; 1 Ret	DON; 1; 30	SPA; 1; 29	BRH; 1; 26	DON; 1 Ret	22nd	4
2020	Speedworks Motorsport	Toyota GR Supra GT4	GT4	OUL; 1; 17	OUL; 2 Ret	DON; 1; 15	DON; 2; 15	BRH; 1; 16	DON; 1; 19	SNE; 1; 23	SNE; 2; 23	**SIL**; **1**; 27	8th	99.5
