= Andy Wilmot =

British racing driver (born 1980)

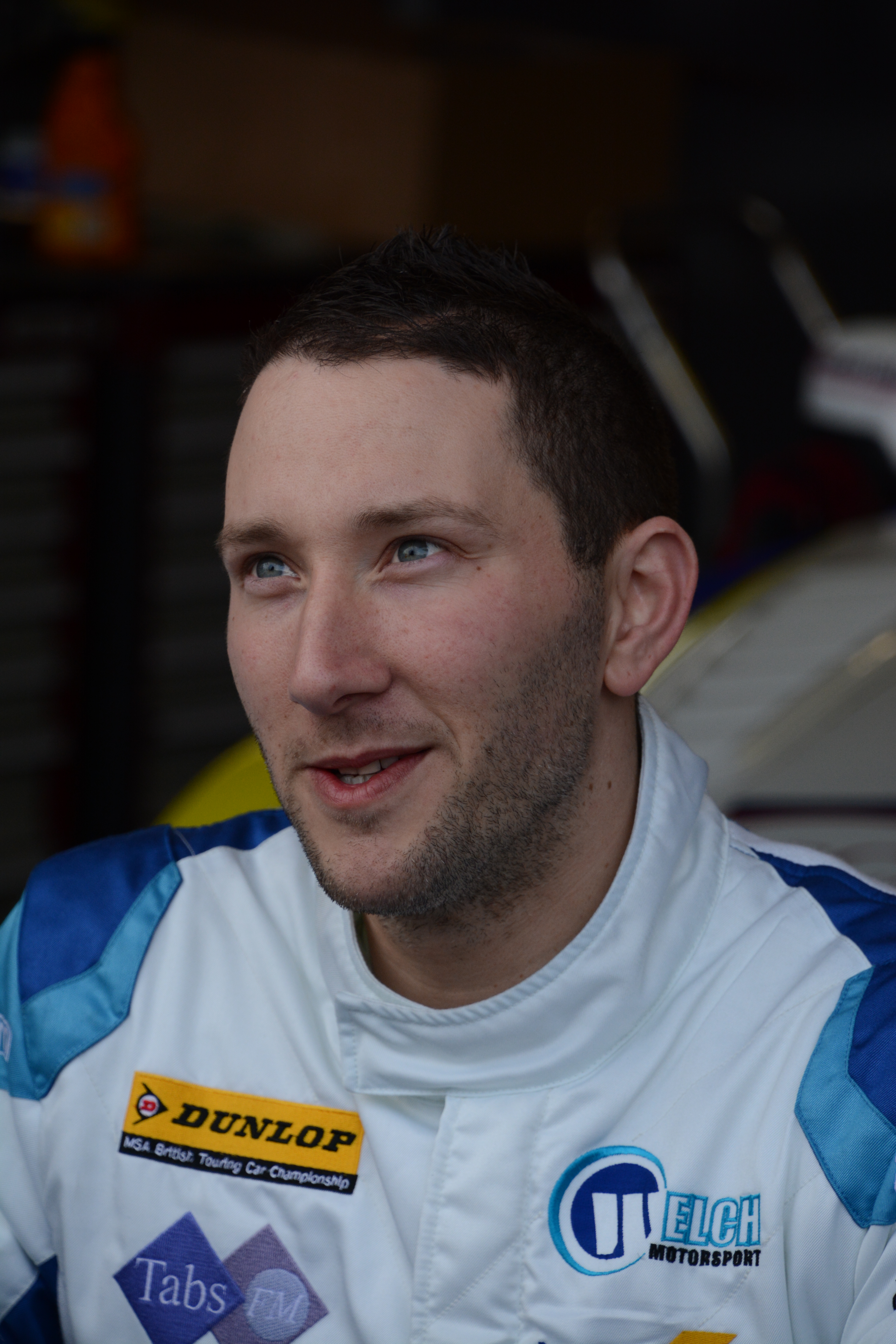
- Wilmot at Brands Hatch during the 2015 British Touring Car Championship season
- Nationality: (United Kingdom) British
- Born: Andrew Wilmot; 4 September 1980 (age 46) Dartford, Kent, England

British Touring Car Championship career
- Debut season: 2013
- Current team: Excelr8 with TradePriceCars.com
- Car number: 55
- Former teams: PPCGB.com/Kraftwerk Racing; Welch Motorsport
- Starts: 16
- Wins: 0
- Poles: 0
- Fastest laps: 0
- Best finish: 32nd in 2021

Previous series
- 2014 2013 2013 2012–2013 2012 2010–2012: Ford Fiesta Championship; British Touring Car Championship; Mini Challenge GB; Volkswagen Racing Cup GB; Renault Clio Cup United Kingdom; Ford Fiesta Championship

Andrew Wilmot (born 4 September 1980) is a British racing driver. In 2013, Wilmot competed in the British Touring Car Championship for the first time at Rockingham, driving for Team HARD in a Volkswagen CC NGTC. He returned to the championship in 2021, driving for Excelr8 Motorsport.

== Racing career ==
Wilmot began his career in the Ford Fiesta Championship in 2010. He switched to the Volkswagen Racing Cup GB for 2012, he finished fourteenth overall, with 186 points. In September 2013, it was announced that Wilmot would make his British Touring Car Championship debut with Tony Gilham Racing replacing Tom Onslow-Cole. For the 2015 British Touring Car Championship season Wilmot moved to Welch Motorsport, driving a Proton Persona.

== Racing record ==
=== Complete British Touring Car Championship results ===
(key) (Races in bold indicate pole position – 1 point awarded just in first race; races in italics indicate fastest lap – 1 point awarded all races; * signifies that driver led race for at least one lap – 1 point given all races)

Year	Team	Car	1	2	3	4	5	6	7	8	9	10	11	12	13	14	15	16	17	18	19	20	21	22	23	24	25	26	27	28	29	30	DC	Pts
2013	PPCGB.com/Kraftwerk Racing	Volkswagen CC	BRH; 1	BRH; 2	BRH; 3	DON; 1	DON; 2	DON; 3	THR; 1	THR; 2	THR; 3	OUL; 1	OUL; 2	OUL; 3	CRO; 1	CRO; 2	CRO; 3	SNE; 1	SNE; 2	SNE; 3	KNO; 1	KNO; 2	KNO; 3	ROC; 1; 18	ROC; 2; 20	ROC; 3; 18	SIL; 1	SIL; 2	SIL; 3	BRH; 1	BRH; 2	BRH; 3	38th	0
2015	Welch Motorsport	Proton Persona	BRH; 1 DNS	BRH; 2 DNS	BRH; 3 DNS	DON; 1 Ret	DON; 2 DNS	DON; 3 DNS	THR; 1; 22	THR; 2; 21	THR; 3; 20	OUL; 1; 26	OUL; 2; 24	OUL; 3 Ret	CRO; 1 Ret	CRO; 2; 22	CRO; 3 Ret	SNE; 1	SNE; 2	SNE; 3	KNO; 1	KNO; 2	KNO; 3	ROC; 1	ROC; 2	ROC; 3	SIL; 1	SIL; 2	SIL; 3	BRH; 1	BRH; 2	BRH; 3	33rd	0
2021	Excelr8 with TradePriceCars.com	Hyundai i30 Fastback N Performance	THR; 1	THR; 2	THR; 3	SNE; 1	SNE; 2	SNE; 3	BRH; 1	BRH; 2	BRH; 3	OUL; 1	OUL; 2	OUL; 3	KNO; 1	KNO; 2	KNO; 3	THR; 1	THR; 2	THR; 3	CRO; 1	CRO; 2	CRO; 3	SIL; 1	SIL; 2	SIL; 3	DON; 1	DON; 2	DON; 3	BRH; 1; 25	BRH; 2; 19	BRH; 3; 25	32nd	0
