= 2027 PM Junior Championship =

1st running of Power Maxed's racing series

The 2027 Power Maxed Junior Championship is set to be the first running of Power Maxed's racing series, set up by Power Maxed Racing.

The series is set to appear at all ten meetings of the British Touring Car Championship.

== Teams and drivers ==
All teams are set to run the PM1 car, installed with an M-Sport engine with a Quaife gearbox and Cosworth electronics.

Team	No.	Drivers	Rounds
Privateer	TBC	(United Kingdom) Leo Belimenko	TBC
CCK Motorsport	TBC	TBA	TBC
CCK Motorsport	TBC	TBA	TBC
CTS Motorsport	TBC	TBA	TBC
CTS Motorsport	TBC	TBA	TBC
Speedworks Motorsport Rising Stars	TBC	TBA	TBC
Speedworks Motorsport Rising Stars	TBC	TBA	TBC
WSR	TBC	TBA	TBC
WSR	TBC	TBA	TBC

Teams joining

BTCC teams, WSR and Speedworks Motorsport both announced their intent to compete in the series. Speedworks will run under the banner Speedworks Motorsport Rising Stars, due to their use of the series to obtain young talents for their BTCC and British GT teams.

Caterham and Ginetta team CTS Motorsport announced they would field two cars in the series, on an arrive-and-drive basis.

Former Porsche Carrera Cup Great Britain team CCK Motorsport joined the series.

Drivers joining

Leo Belimenko joined the series from karting.

== Race calendar ==
The 2027 calendar is set to run at all 10 British Touring Car Championship meetings.

Round		Circuit	Date
1	R1	Donington Park (National Circuit, Leicestershire)	10–11 April
1	R2	Donington Park (National Circuit, Leicestershire)	10–11 April
1	R3	Donington Park (National Circuit, Leicestershire)	10–11 April
2	R4	Brands Hatch (Indy Circuit, Kent)	8–9 May
2	R5	Brands Hatch (Indy Circuit, Kent)	8–9 May
2	R6	Brands Hatch (Indy Circuit, Kent)	8–9 May
3	R7	Snetterton Motor Racing Circuit (300 Circuit, Norfolk)	29–30 May
3	R8	Snetterton Motor Racing Circuit (300 Circuit, Norfolk)	29–30 May
3	R9	Snetterton Motor Racing Circuit (300 Circuit, Norfolk)	29–30 May
4	R10	Oulton Park (Island Circuit, Cheshire)	12–13 June
4	R11	Oulton Park (Island Circuit, Cheshire)	12–13 June
4	R12	Oulton Park (Island Circuit, Cheshire)	12–13 June
5	R13	Thruxton Circuit (Hampshire)	24–25 July
5	R14	Thruxton Circuit (Hampshire)	24–25 July
5	R15	Thruxton Circuit (Hampshire)	24–25 July
6	R16	Knockhill Racing Circuit (Fife)	7–8 August
6	R17	Knockhill Racing Circuit (Fife)	7–8 August
6	R18	Knockhill Racing Circuit (Fife)	7–8 August
7	R19	Croft Circuit (North Yorkshire)	14–15 August
7	R20	Croft Circuit (North Yorkshire)	14–15 August
7	R21	Croft Circuit (North Yorkshire)	14–15 August
8	R22	Donington Park (Grand Prix Circuit, Leicestershire)	11–12 September
8	R23	Donington Park (Grand Prix Circuit, Leicestershire)	11–12 September
8	R24	Donington Park (Grand Prix Circuit, Leicestershire)	11–12 September
9	R25	Silverstone Circuit (National Circuit, Northamptonshire)	25–26 September
9	R26	Silverstone Circuit (National Circuit, Northamptonshire)	25–26 September
9	R27	Silverstone Circuit (National Circuit, Northamptonshire)	25–26 September
10	R28	Brands Hatch (Grand Prix Circuit, Kent)	9–10 October
10	R29	Brands Hatch (Grand Prix Circuit, Kent)	9–10 October
10	R30	Brands Hatch (Grand Prix Circuit, Kent)	9–10 October
