= Mountune Racing =

English automotive engineering company

- Industry: automotive engineering
- Founded: 1980
- Owner: Revolve Technologies Ltd
- Website: mountuneracing.com

Mountune Racing is a specialist automotive engineering company. It was formed in 1980 in Maldon, Essex by David Mountain to provide Mini race engines.

In the late 1980s, Mountune started preparing Cosworth YB engines for numerous motorsport championships. David Mountain quickly realised the potential of this twin cam, 4 valve turbocharged engine and started development for race and rally applications. Mountune’s team of engineers worked closely with Ford’s own motorsport group based at the Boreham facility in the UK to supply various works teams and hundreds of privateers with Ford YB engines, forging a long-term association with Ford Motor Company.

In 1990, the Mountune powered Ford Sierra RS500 of Robb Gravett won the British Touring Car Championship, resulting in Mountune supplying race winning engines to customers around the world. In the early ’90s, Group A rallying was the pinnacle of its sport and the works Escort Cosworths were all powered by Mountune built, 2-litre Ford YB engines.

To date, Mountune has supplied engines for road and rally racing, supporting championship teams from Ford, Formula Palmer Audi, Ascari and Petronas/Proton. In 2009, they were contracted to build the new Audi race engines for the new FIA Formula Two Championship. The company currently provides both Ford and Subaru engines for the British Touring Car Championship.

Drivers who have used Mountune engines include, Robb Gravett, Stig Blomqvist, Colin McRae, Mohammed bin Sulayem, François Delecour, Carlos Sainz Sr., Malcolm Wilson, Pentti Airikkala, Robbie Head, Miki Biasion, Gwyndaf Evans, Juha Kankkunen, Tommi Mäkinen, Guy Smith and Tom Chilton.

The company was acquired by Roush Industries in 2004, joining expertise and premises with Roush Europe in Brentwood, England. In 2008, after a Roush Europe management buyout, the parent company became Revolve Technologies Ltd.

== Highlights ==
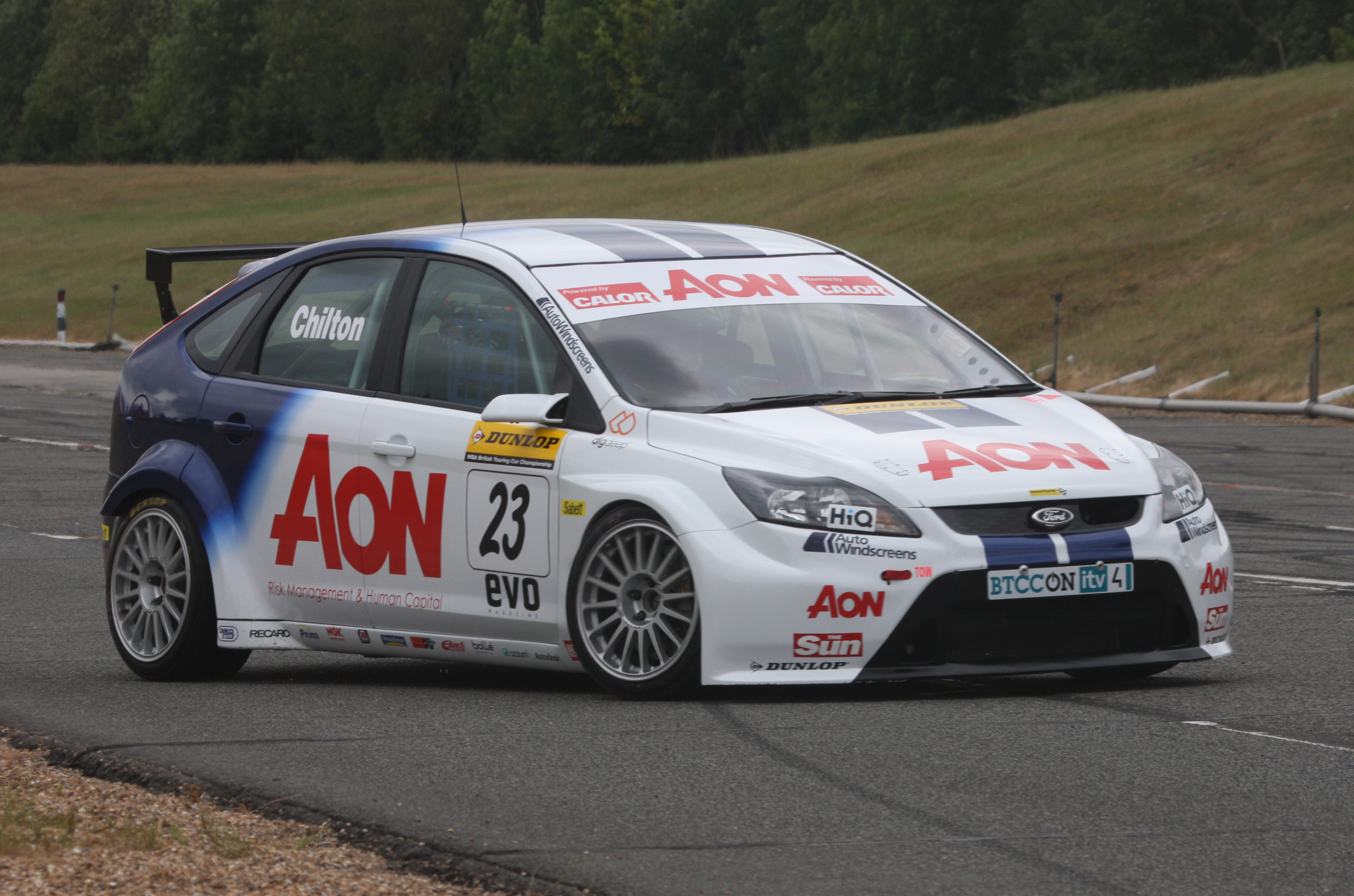
Calor Gas powered 2 litre Ford Duratec, built and prepared by Mountune Racing

| year | accomplishment |
|---|---|
| 1990 | British Touring Car Championship Group A |
| 1992 | British Rally Championship Group N |
| 1993 | Four wins in the World Rally Championship |
| 1994 | Monte Carlo Rally |
| 1995 | European and British Formula Ford Championships |
| 1996 | British Rally Championship |
| 1997 | Two wins in the FIA World Rally Championship |
| 1998 | FIA Middle-East Rally Championship |
| 1999 | Safari Rally Kenya |
| 1999 | Portugal Rally |
| 2000 | FIA Middle-East Rally Championship |
| 2002 | Monte Carlo Rally Super 1600 |
| 2003 | Touring car lap record at Macau |
| 2004 | LMP1 Le Mans diesel sports prototype |
| 2005 | Formula Ford Duratec |
| 2006 | European GT3 with Damax |
| 2007 | 2-litre S2000 Ford Duratec engine design and development for Ford Australia Super 2000 Fiesta in Australian Rally Championship |
| 2007 | Yamaha R1 Superbike engine design and development for Jentin Racing in the British Superbike Championship |
| 2007 | 2-litre Mitsubishi engine design and development Emotive/Lola for its US single seater programme |
| 2008 | Jaguar XKR V8 s/c engine design and development for Jaguar Cars in the FIA European GT3 Championship |
| 2009 | V6 BTCS engine design, development and builds for Chad/Kia in BTCS |
| 2009 | F2 Championship engine design, development and builds for FIA Formula Two Championship |
| 2009 | BTCC engine design, development and builds for Arena Motorsport Focus ST |
| 2016 | BTCC Independent Champions with Motorbase, 13 wins for Mountune powered cars (7 for Motorbase, 6 for BMR Subaru) |
