= TOCA =

British motorsports event organiser

TOCA, formally trading as BARC (TOCA) Ltd, is an organiser of motorsport events in the United Kingdom. The company organises and administers the British Touring Car Championship (BTCC) and the support series to the BTCC, sometimes known as the TOCA Tour or TOCA Package. The BTCC is the UK's biggest motor racing championship and the headline act to a host of support races covering the entire weekend.

== History ==
BARC (TOCA) Ltd undertakes the entire management of the championship from regulations to event direction and marketing. Alan J. Gow is the series director and administrator of the BTCC and the managing director of BARC (TOCA) Ltd.

Gow formed TOCA Limited in 1990, purchasing the rights to the BTCC in 1991 and proceeding to turn the championship into the largest of its type in the world and one of the most widely watched motorsport series around the globe. In 2000, Gow sold TOCA to American company Octagon Motorsport (part of the US NASDAQ-listed Interpublic group) and took a break from managing both TOCA and the BTCC.

In 2003, Octagon relinquished its ownership of TOCA and its control of the BTCC. The current company, BARC (TOCA) Ltd was formed to take over and manage the championship. Gow was appointed managing director of the new company and returned to once again take charge and rebuild the championship, after it had floundered under the control of the previous management.

TOCA Australia was an offshoot again headed by Gow, which ran the Australian Super Touring Championship during the 1990s when there was an Australian series that mirrored the Super Touring regulations then run in the BTCC. TOCA Australia ceased operating in the early 2000s.

== TOCA Package ==
The TOCA package consists of the BTCC and five main support series, which accompany the BTCC at almost every event, with some smaller club championships also joining the schedule at one or two events. All of the support series are either Single Make Championships or Formula racing.

Since 2004, the BTCC calendar has been contested across ten events of three races each, making a 30-round competition that covers the length and breadth of the UK.

First introduced in 2011, all cars are now built to the same Next Generation Touring Car (NGTC) technical regulations, implemented to dramatically reduce the design, build and running costs of the cars and engines. With an emphasis on some common components, NGTC allows independent teams to compete on a level playing field against manufacturer-backed efforts by keeping costs down, whilst at the same time rewarding precise engineering and strategy.

Teams have the option of running either TOCA’s unbranded NGTC-spec engine or – whether privateer or full manufacturer-backed entries – developing their own powerplant to the regulations, as long as it is from the same ‘family’ as their chosen model of car. All are 350+bhp two-litre turbocharged units.

Having previously supported the BTCC in the late 1990s and sporadically since, the British Formula Ford Championship announced its return to the TOCA support package full-time for 2013 at all ten events. In 2015, the single-seater series was renamed MSA Formula, conforming to the FIA's new Formula 4 regulations. It was renamed again in 2017, becoming the F4 British Championship certified by FIA – powered by Ford. All cars use chassis produced by Mygale and EcoBoost engines from Ford, as well as a fully adjustable aerodynamic package including front and rear wings.

The Ginetta GT4 SuperCup is a GT-style, dual-class championship that follows a pro-am format, with professional and amateur drivers alike utilising Ginetta's G55 sportscar. The series features at most TOCA events, with either two or three SuperCup races per weekend.

Ginetta also runs a series on the support package that caters for up and coming young talent in the form of the Ginetta Junior Championship. These 14- to 17-year-olds race in identical Ginetta G40J cars with strict regulations that help keep costs down. The Ginetta Junior Championship supports every BTCC event, with either two or three races at each.

Out of all the current support series, the Porsche Carrera Cup GB is the longest-serving. Drivers compete in identical Porsche 911 GT3 Cup (Type 997) cars that produce 450bhp. The three-tier championship splits drivers according to their racing experience. Professional drivers compete in the Pro class, with semi-professional and amateur drivers racing in Pro-Am1 and Pro-Am2. The Carrera Cup currently accompanies the vast majority of TOCA events, hosting two races at each.

Finally, the Mini Challenge UK is a one-make race series that began in 2002 and since 2020 it has run as a support package to the British Touring Car Championship. It replaced the Renault Clio Cup United Kingdom as a support series to the BTCC. Throughout its history it has established itself as one of the main routes into topline Touring Car racing. Many of its drivers have gone on to do well in the Renault Clio Cup United Kingdom, British Touring Car Championship, World Touring Car Championship and British GT Championship. Past and current drivers include Jeff Smith (racing driver), Charlie Butler-Henderson, Harry Vaulkhard, Vicki Butler-Henderson, Brett Smith (racing driver), Paul O'Neill (racing driver), Nick Foster (British racing driver), Arthur Forster, Stewart Lines, Martin Depper, Chris Smiley and Ant Whorton-Eales.

=== Previous support races ===
- Formula Renault UK - early in 2012, the long supporting Formula Renault UK championship announced that it had cancelled its 2012 season after only receiving six entries, but hoped to return for the 2013 season. However, it was reported in the media that the series was ended definitively in September 2012.
- SEAT Cupra Championship - was a one make series that ran for six years between 2003 and 2008, and as a support package to the BTCC between 2004 and 2008. The series folded after SEAT UK ended its racing activities.
- Renault UK Clio Cup was a single-make series geared towards aspiring touring car drivers, utilising identical Clio Cup 4 UK race cars. The championship awarded three different titles for drivers. Along with the overall drivers’ crown, younger rookie drivers can chased points towards the Graduate Cup and older gentlemen drivers could seek points for the Masters Cup. The UK Clio Cup held two races at almost all BTCC weekends. In 2020 it was replaced by the Mini Challenge UK on the TOCA support package.
- Formula BMW UK
- Renault Spider Cup
- Formula Vauxhall
- Formula Vauxhall Junior
- Lotus Elise Championship
- Vauxhall Vectra Championship
- Ford Fiesta Championship
