= Speedworks Motorsport =

British motor racing team

(United Kingdom) Speedworks Motorsport
- Founded: 2005
- Team principal(s): Christian Dick; Danny Buxton
- Current series: British Touring Car Championship; Fiesta Junior Championship; Future: PM Junior Championship
- Former series: 24H Series; Ginetta G50 Cup; British GT Championship; Mini Challenge UK
- Current drivers: British Touring Car Championship; 7. (United Kingdom) Ryan Bensley; 50. (Republic of Ireland) Árón Taylor-Smith; 52. (United Kingdom) Gordon Shedden; 66. (United Kingdom) Josh Cook; Fiesta Junior Championship; 12. (United Kingdom) Lewis Islin; 63. (United Kingdom) Daniel Hartley; 70. (United Kingdom) Benjy Douglas; 287. (United Kingdom) Max Fenton
- Website: http://www.speedworksmotorsport.com/about/

Speedworks Motorsport is a British motor racing team based in Great Budworth, Cheshire. The team was formed in 2005 by Christian and Amy Dick. They are best known for competing in the British Touring Car Championship since 2011, most notably they have entered under the name of Toyota Gazoo Racing UK.

They currently compete under the names; 'Speedworks Corolla Racing' as a manufacturer and 'Laser Tools Racing with MB Motorsport' as an independent in the British Touring Car Championship due to the main Toyota commitments.

== History ==
Speedworks Motorsport first started racing in the MaX5 Racing Series, before switching to Ginetta racing in 2007. They have also entered a Chevrolet Corvette GT3 in the British GT Championship.

== British Touring Car Championship ==
=== Toyota Avensis (2011–2018) ===
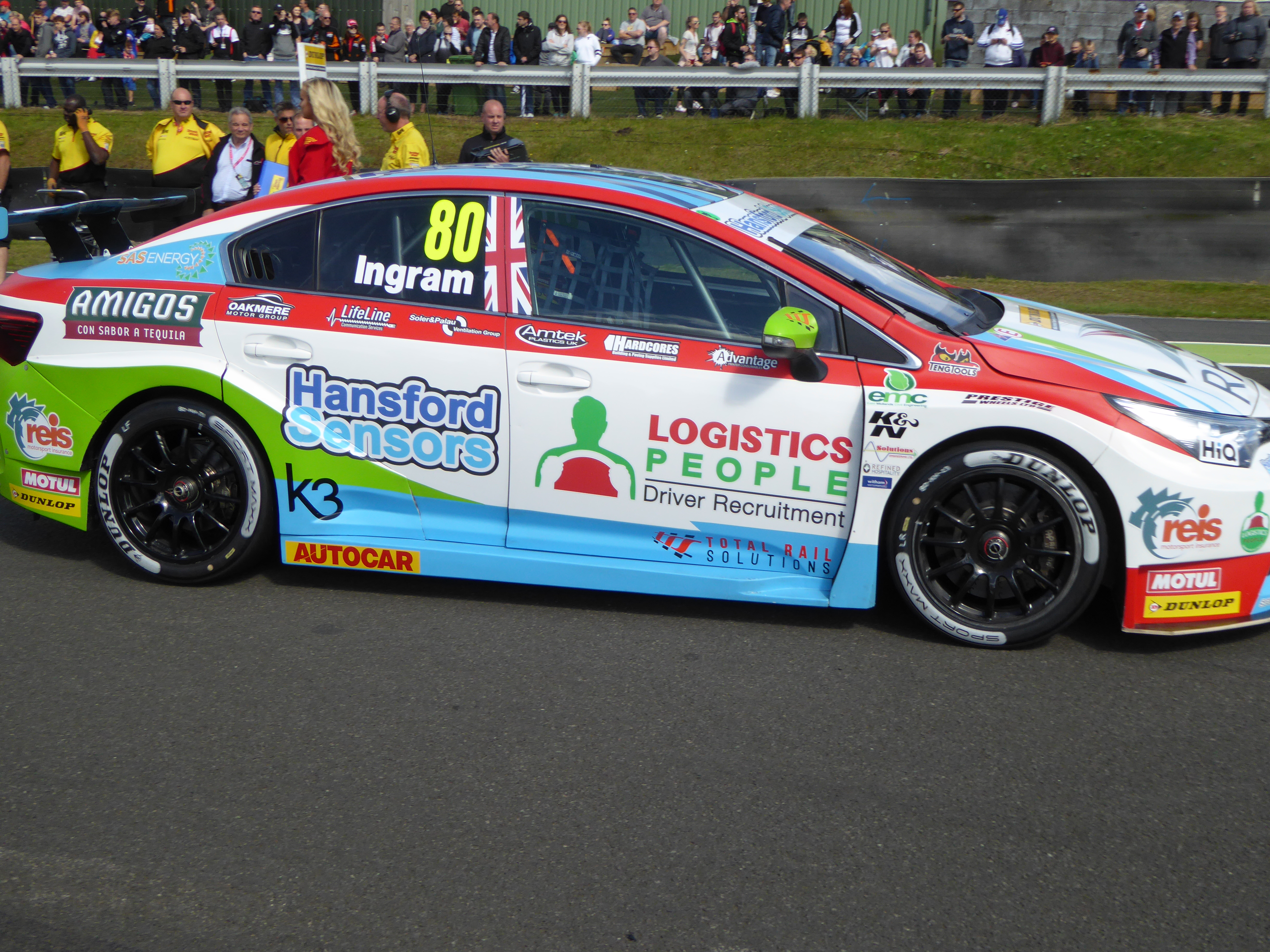
Tom Ingram, at the Knockhill round of the 2017 British Touring Car Championship.

Alongside their British GT commitments, Speedworks also become one of the first teams to compete with a full Next Generation Touring Car specification car in the British Touring Car Championship with a Toyota Avensis driven by Tony Hughes in 2011. They missed the third round of the championship at Thruxton in order to fix the technical problems they had been experiencing with the new car in the opening rounds. The team returned at the following round at Oulton Park where they scored their best result of the season with fourteenth place in race two, but they were forced to miss the Croft round due to continuation of their power steering problems. The team raced again at Snetterton and then skipped the next two rounds before racing in the final two events of the year.

The following season they expanded to a two car team, with a second car for Ginetta GT Supercup champion, Adam Morgan alongside Hughes. On two occasions, former BTCC race winner Paul O'Neill deputised for Hughes due to the latter driver's business commitments, the first being at Croft. O'Neill replaced Hughes once again at Knockhill. In race two he finished fourth to achieve Speedworks' best result in the BTCC. At the end of the season Speedworks were 10th in the teams' standings and sixth in the independent teams' standings. At the end of the season Hughes announced his retirement from motor racing although he would remain involved with the team. Morgan left the team to drive for his family run Ciceley Racing team the following season.

In November 2012, Speedworks tested Dave Newsham and Lea Wood at Donington Park. The following month, Newsham was confirmed in the first car for the 2013 season.

Tom Ingram joined the team for the 2014 season. He scored two podiums in 2015, and claimed two wins and six podiums in 2016. Ingram finished third in the 2017 season, with four wins and nine podiums in 30 races.

=== Toyota Corolla ===
For 2019, the team will campaign a single Toyota Corolla, for Tom Ingram, with manufacturer support from Toyota GB.

== Rising Stars Programme ==
In late 2025, Speedworks Motorsport launched a junior driver programme which spanned junior tin-top car racing.

The team had a shootout for the Fiesta Junior Championship scholarship, where Lewis Islin, Benjy Douglas, Daniel Hartley and Max Fenton all won a driver for the coveted team in the championship.

The Speedworks Motorsport fold also expanded to the Mini Challenge UK, with Eden Spanswick being the sole driver for the 2026 season.

The Speedworks Motorsport Rising Stars will also expand to the PM Junior Championship in 2027.
