= 2020 Porsche Sprint Challenge Great Britain =

Porsche auto racing 2020

The 2020 Porsche Sprint Challenge Great Britain (known for sponsorship reasons as the 2020 Cayman Islands Porsche Sprint Challenge Great Britain) was a multi-event, one-make motor racing championship held across England and Scotland. The championship featured a mix of professional motor racing teams and privately funded drivers, competing in Porsche 718 Cayman GT4 Clubsport cars. The 2020 season was the 1st Porsche Sprint Challenge GB season, the season began on 11 July 2020 at Snetterton Circuit and ended on 8 November at Silverstone Circuit.

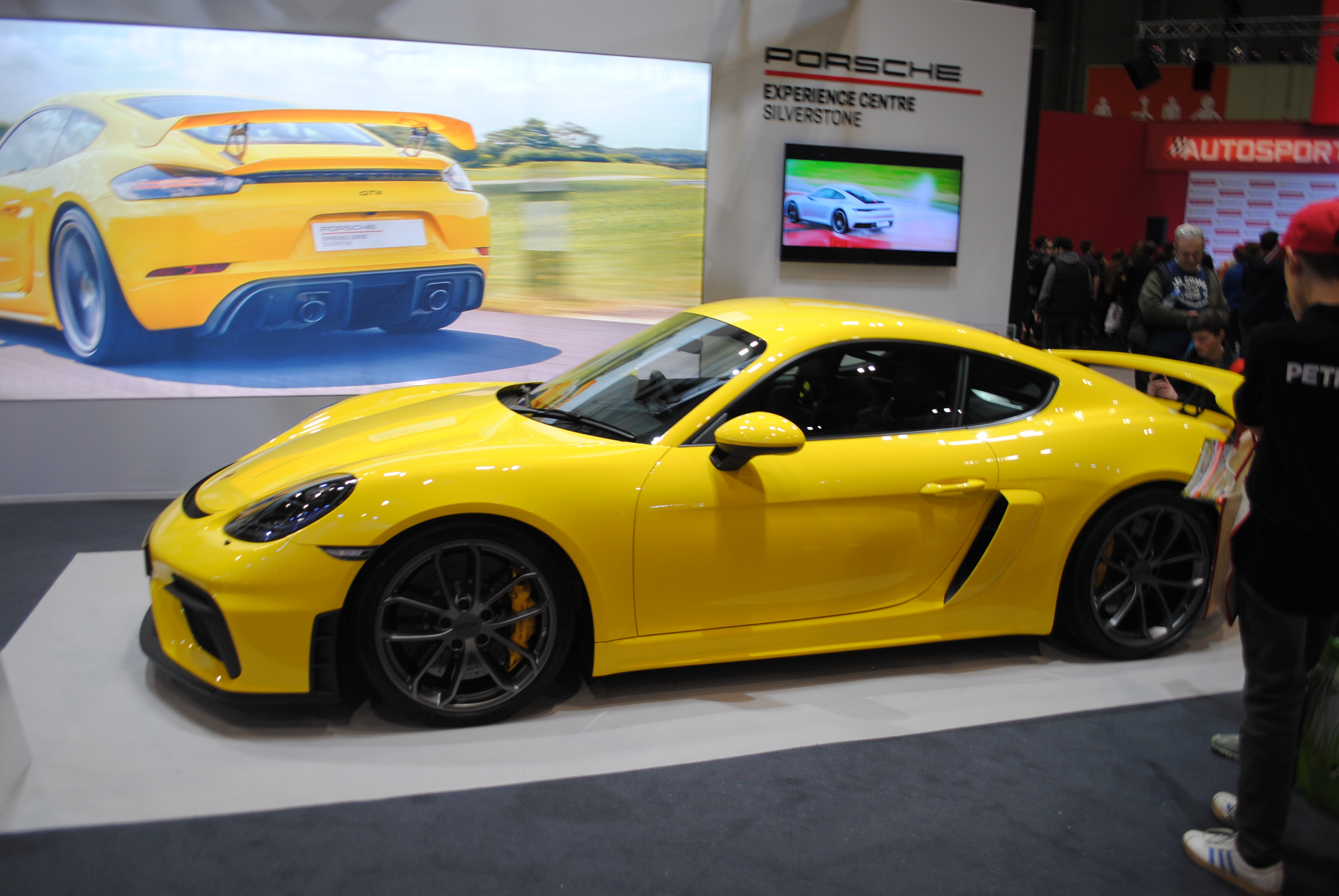
The car used in the championship, the Porsche 718 Cayman GT4 Clubsport.

== Teams and Drivers ==
The following teams and drivers are currently signed to run the 2020 season.

Team	No.	Driver	Rounds
Pro Class
Rob Boston Racing	9	(United Kingdom) Charles Ladell	6
Rob Boston Racing	10	(United Kingdom) Tom Jackson	1–5
Redline Racing	18	(United Kingdom) Archie Hamilton	1–5
Redline Racing	40	(United Kingdom) Ethan Hawkey	1–5
Redline Racing	88	(United Kingdom) Dino Zamparelli	6
IN2 Racing	23	(United Kingdom) Alex Toth-Jones	1–3
IN2 Racing	23	(United Kingdom) Sarah Moore	4–5
IN2 Racing	32	(United Kingdom) James Dorlin	All
TCR	54	(United Kingdom) Theo Edgerton	All
Am Class
Forelle Estates Racing	3	(United Kingdom) Michael Price	1–4, 6
Jordan Racing Team	5	(United Kingdom) Peter Chambers	All
Team Parker Racing	7	(United Kingdom) Charles March	6
Valluga Racing	8	(United Kingdom) Adam Knight	6
Valluga Racing	22	(United Kingdom) Carl Cavers	All
Valluga Racing	27	(United Kingdom) Ian Humphries	All
Redline Racing	15	(United Kingdom) Nigel Rice	All
Redline Racing	24	(United Kingdom) Paul Donkin	5
Redline Racing	33	(United Kingdom) Chris Car	2, 4
Redline Racing	55	(United Kingdom) Daniel O'Brien	6
Redline Racing	81	(Austria) Gustav Engljähringer	3
IN2 Racing	51	(Norway) Ambrogio Perfetti (Note: Ambrogio Perfetti is an Italian driver competing under a Norwegian license.)	All
IN2 Racing	77	(United Kingdom) Charles Clark	6
IN2 Racing	99	(Estonia) Andrey Borodin	6
Simon Green Motorsport	56	(United Kingdom) Simon Green	6
Rob Boston Racing	66	(United Kingdom) John Westbrook	1–4, 6

== Race Calendar ==
A new calendar was announced on 26 May 2020.

Round	Circuit	Date	Pole position	Fastest lap	Winning Pro	Winning team	Winning Am	Supporting
1	Snetterton Circuit (300 Circuit, Norfolk)	11–12 July	(United Kingdom) James Dorlin	(United Kingdom) James Dorlin	(United Kingdom) James Dorlin	IN2 Racing	(Norway) Ambrogio Perfetti	Porsche Club GB; GT Cup
1	Snetterton Circuit (300 Circuit, Norfolk)	11–12 July		(United Kingdom) Theo Edgerton	(United Kingdom) James Dorlin	IN2 Racing	(Norway) Ambrogio Perfetti	Porsche Club GB; GT Cup
2	Donington Park (Grand Prix Circuit, Leicestershire)	15–16 August	(United Kingdom) Tom Jackson	(United Kingdom) Tom Jackson	(United Kingdom) Tom Jackson	Rob Boston Racing	(Norway) Ambrogio Perfetti	British GT Championship
2	Donington Park (Grand Prix Circuit, Leicestershire)	15–16 August		(United Kingdom) Tom Jackson	(United Kingdom) James Dorlin	IN2 Racing	(United Kingdom) Pete Chambers	British GT Championship
3	Brands Hatch (Indy Circuit, Kent)	6 September	(United Kingdom) Tom Jackson	(United Kingdom) Tom Jackson	(United Kingdom) Tom Jackson	Rob Boston Racing	(United Kingdom) Ian Humphries	Porsche Club GB
3	Brands Hatch (Indy Circuit, Kent)	6 September		(United Kingdom) James Dorlin	(United Kingdom) James Dorlin	IN2 Racing	(United Kingdom) John Westbrook	Porsche Club GB
4	Donington Park (Grand Prix Circuit, Leicestershire)	19–20 September	(United Kingdom) Ethan Hawkey	(United Kingdom) Tom Jackson	(United Kingdom) Tom Jackson	Rob Boston Racing	(Norway) Ambrogio Perfetti	British GT Championship
4	Donington Park (Grand Prix Circuit, Leicestershire)	19–20 September		(United Kingdom) Ethan Hawkey	(United Kingdom) Tom Jackson	Rob Boston Racing	(Norway) Ambrogio Perfetti	British GT Championship
5	Croft Circuit (North Yorkshire)	10–11 October	(United Kingdom) James Dorlin	(United Kingdom) James Dorlin	(United Kingdom) James Dorlin	IN2 Racing	(Norway) Ambrogio Perfetti	British Touring Car Championship
5	Croft Circuit (North Yorkshire)	10–11 October		(United Kingdom) James Dorlin	(United Kingdom) James Dorlin	IN2 Racing	(United Kingdom) Paul Donkin	British Touring Car Championship
6	Silverstone Circuit (Grand Prix Circuit, Leicestershire)	7–8 November	(United Kingdom) Dino Zamparelli	(United Kingdom) Charles Ladell	(United Kingdom) Theo Edgerton	TCR	(United Kingdom) Ian Humphries	British GT Championship
6	Silverstone Circuit (Grand Prix Circuit, Leicestershire)	7–8 November		(United Kingdom) Dino Zamparelli	(United Kingdom) James Dorlin	IN2 Racing	(United Kingdom) Ian Humphries	British GT Championship

== Championship standings ==
Points system
1st	2nd	3rd	4th	5th	6th	7th	8th	PP	FL
10	8	6	5	4	3	2	1	1	1

=== Drivers' championships ===
==== Overall championship ====
Pos	Driver	SNE		DON1		BHGP		DON2		CRO		SIL		Pts
Pro Class
1	(United Kingdom) James Dorlin	1	1	2	1	4	1	3	2	1	1	3	1	113
2	(United Kingdom) Tom Jackson	4	2	1	2	1	2	1	1	11	Ret			79
3	(United Kingdom) Theo Edgerton	2	Ret	5	5	2	3	4	3	2	2	1	3	77
4	(United Kingdom) Archie Hamilton	3	3	3	3	DNS	DNS	2	5	3	Ret			44
5	(United Kingdom) Ethan Hawkey	5	Ret	4	7	3	5	5	4	10	3			42
6	(United Kingdom) Alex Toth-Jones	7	Ret	7	4	5	4							20
-	(United Kingdom) Dino Zamparelli*											4	2	-
-	(United Kingdom) Charlie Ladell*											2	8	-
-	(United Kingdom) Sarah Moore*							7	8	4	Ret			-
Am Class
1	(Norway) Ambrogio Perfetti	6	4	6	10	Ret	DNS	6	6	5	6	16	5	94
2	(United Kingdom) Ian Humphries	10	5	8	8	6	Ret	9	7	12	5	5	4	86
3	(United Kingdom) Nigel Rice	9	6	9	9	9	Ret	8	9	7	Ret	7	6	66
4	(United Kingdom) Peter Chambers	11	8	11	6	8	7	11	10	8	DNS	6	13	62
5	(United Kingdom) Carl Cavers	12	10	12	13	10	8	13	14	19	7	9	11	44
6	(United Kingdom) John Westbrook	13	9	14	12	7	6	Ret	13			11	12	36
7	(United Kingdom) Michael Price	8	7	10	Ret	Ret	DNS	10	11			10	14	31
8	(United Kingdom) Chris Car			13	11			12	12					12
-	(United Kingdom) Paul Donkin*									6	4			-
-	(United Kingdom) Daniel O'Brien*											8	7	-
-	(Austria) Gustav Engljähringer*					11	9							-
-	(United Kingdom) Adam Knight*											Ret	9	-
-	(United Kingdom) Charles Clark*											13	10	-
-	(United Kingdom) Simon Green*											12	Ret	-
-	(Estonia) Andrey Borodin*											14	16	-
-	(United Kingdom) Charles March*											15	15	-
Pos	Driver	SNE		DON1		BHGP		DON2		CRO		SIL		Pts

* Guest entry - not eligible for points
