= 2010 Mini Challenge UK =

Motor racing competition

Seasons
- ← 2009 2011 →

The 2010 Mini Challenge season was the ninth season of the Mini Challenge UK. The season started on 10 April at Rockingham Motor Speedway and ended on 29 August at Thruxton Circuit. The season featured seven rounds across the UK.

== Calendar ==
Round		Circuit	Date
1	R1	Rockingham Motor Speedway	10–11 April
1	R2	Rockingham Motor Speedway	10–11 April
1	R3	Rockingham Motor Speedway	10–11 April
2	R4	Snetterton Motor Racing Circuit	8–9 May
2	R5	Snetterton Motor Racing Circuit	8–9 May
2	R6	Snetterton Motor Racing Circuit	8–9 May
3	R7	Oulton Park	29–30 May
3	R8	Oulton Park	29–30 May
3	R9	Oulton Park	29–30 May
4	R10	Pembrey Circuit	26–27 June
4	R11	Pembrey Circuit	26–27 June
4	R12	Pembrey Circuit	26–27 June
5	R13	Castle Combe	17–18 July
5	R14	Castle Combe	17–18 July
5	R15	Castle Combe	17–18 July
6	R16	Brands Hatch	14–15 August
6	R17	Brands Hatch	14–15 August
6	R18	Brands Hatch	14–15 August
7	R19	Thruxton Circuit	28–29 August
7	R20	Thruxton Circuit	28–29 August
7	R21	Thruxton Circuit	28–29 August

== Entry list ==
Team	No.	Driver	Rounds
JCW Class
Excelr8 Motorsport	1	(United Kingdom) Luke Caudle	All
Mini Matt	5	(United Kingdom) Andrew Bailey	7
Mini Matt	21	(United Kingdom) Matthew Pike	3–4, 6
Coastal Racing	10	(United Kingdom) Chris Smith	All
Coastal Racing	25	(United Kingdom) Jason Mills	1–2
Coastal Racing	25	(United Kingdom) Carl Bradley	3
Coastal Racing	25	(United Kingdom) Tiffany Chittenden	6
Coastal Racing	69	(United Kingdom) Chris Panayiotou	1
Mini Spares UK	24	(United Kingdom) Chris Knox	All
Mark Fish Motorsport	50	(United Kingdom) Jason Richardson	All
Mark Fish Motorsport	69	(United Kingdom) Ben Anderson	3
Mark Fish Motorsport	69	(United Kingdom) Stuart Clarke	4
Mark Fish Motorsport	69	(United Kingdom) Roger Grimshaw	5
Team Oxford	51	(United Kingdom) Chris Oakman	1–2, 5
Team Oxford	51	(United Kingdom) Gavin Bristow	3–4, 6–7
Cooper S Class
Team Powerstart	2	(United Kingdom) Dean Raymond	1–3, 6–7
Truck Align	7	(United Kingdom) Craig Freeman	All
Truck Align	26	(United Kingdom) Lee Allen	All
Privateer	28	(United Kingdom) Ian Milton	1
Privateer	66	(United Kingdom) Steve Liquorish	1, 4–5
Team AKB	36	(United Kingdom) Chris Vinall	1–2
Electro Services	40	(United Kingdom) Chris James	2–7
Sullivan Racing	68	(United Kingdom) Lee Sullivan	All
Cooper Class
Mini Motorsport	3	(United Kingdom) Roger Bates	2, 4, 6
Excelr8 Motorsport	5	(United Kingdom) Alan Wichenden	4, 6
Excelr8 Motorsport	11	(United Kingdom) Jason Foster	7
Excelr8 Motorsport	15	(United Kingdom) Justina Williams	All
Excelr8 Motorsport	16	(United Kingdom) James Whelan	1
Excelr8 Motorsport	16	(United Kingdom) James Fletcher	5
Excelr8 Motorsport	17	(United Kingdom) Tom Wood	5
Excelr8 Motorsport	19	(United Kingdom) Sarah Parsons	2–6
Excelr8 Motorsport	31	(United Kingdom) Keith Issatt	6
Truck Align	9	(United Kingdom) Kevin O'Connor	All
Privateer	13	(United Kingdom) Gary Kounnis	6–7
Team O Racing	18	(United Kingdom) Sam Osborne	All
Mark Fish Motorsport	45	(United Kingdom) David Ogden	All

== Championship standings ==
Scoring system

Championship points were awarded for the first 15 positions in each Championship Race. Entries were required to complete 75% of the winning car's race distance in order to be classified and earn points. There were bonus points awarded for Pole Position and Fastest Lap.

Championship Race points

Position	1st	2nd	3rd	4th	5th	6th	7th	8th	9th	10th	11th	12th	13th	14th	15th
Points	20	17	15	13	11	10	9	8	7	6	5	4	3	2	1

=== Drivers' Championship ===
==== JCW Class ====
Pos	Driver	ROC			SNE			OUL			PEM			CAS			BHI			THR			Pts
1	(United Kingdom) Luke Caudle	1	1	3	2	2	1	2	3	2	1	1	2	1	1	4	2	1	1	1	3	1	393
2	(United Kingdom) Chris Knox	3	2	4	1	1	2	3	1	3	Ret	2	1	4	4	1	1	7	3	3	2	3	328
3	(United Kingdom) Chris Smith	6	5	Ret	4	4	3	6	5	7	6	5	5	5	3	3	5	3	6	2	1	2	258
4	(United Kingdom) Jason Richardson	4	4	5	3	3	Ret	8	Ret	4	3	3	3	3	5	5	4	2	Ret	Ret	6	6	222
5	(United Kingdom) Gavin Bristow							5	4	5	4	Ret	4				3	4	2	4	4	4	145
6	(United Kingdom) Chris Oakman	5	3	2	Ret	DNS	DNS							2	2	2							96
7	(United Kingdom) Matthew Pike							7	Ret	6	2	4	6				6	5	5				92
8	(United Kingdom) Stuart Clarke							1	2	1													60
9	(United Kingdom) Chris Panayiotou	2	6	1																			49
10	(United Kingdom) Andrew Bailey																			5	5	5	33
11	(United Kingdom) Tiffany Chittenden																7	6	4				32
12	(United Kingdom) Ben Anderson										5	6	Ret										21
13	(United Kingdom) Carl Bradley							4	Ret	Ret													13
14	(United Kingdom) Jason Mills	Ret	DNS	DNS	DNS	DNS	DNS																0
15	(United Kingdom) Roger Grimshaw													Ret	DNS	DNS							0

==== Cooper S Class ====
Pos	Driver	ROC			SNE			OUL			PEM			CAS			BHI			THR			Pts
1	(United Kingdom) Lee Allen	1	1	1	1	Ret	1	Ret	2	1	1	1	1	1	1	1	1	2	2	1	1	1	394
2	(United Kingdom) Lee Sullivan	2	3	2	3	1	2	3	3	Ret	Ret	2	3	2	2	Ret	2	1	1	Ret	2	4	284
3	(United Kingdom) Craig Freeman	6	4	7	5	2	4	Ret	4	2	4	Ret	Ret	4	3	3	5	4	4	4	4	5	233
4	(United Kingdom) Chris James				6	4	5	2	1	Ret	3	Ret	DNS	3	4	2	3	3	3	3	Ret	3	207
5	(United Kingdom) Dean Raymond	4	5	4	4	3	3	1	Ret	DNS							4	Ret	Ret	2	3	2	162
6	(United Kingdom) Steve Liquorish	3	2	3							2	3	2	Ret	DNS	DNS							96
7	(United Kingdom) Chris Vinall	7	7	5	2	Ret	DNS																47
8	(United Kingdom) Ian Milton	5	6	6																			31

==== Cooper Class ====
Pos	Driver	ROC			SNE			OUL			PEM			CAS			BHI			THR			Pts
1	(United Kingdom) David Ogden	2	2	5	1	1	2	1	4	5	1	1	1	2	1	5	1	1	Ret	5	5	4	348
2	(United Kingdom) Kevin O'Connor	1	1	4	3	2	1	4	5	1	2	4	7	1	5	1	3	2	5	4	1	Ret	318
3	(United Kingdom) Justina Williams	4	4	3	4	4	5	3	2	3	3	3	3	3	2	2	7	5	1	1	2	2	317
4	(United Kingdom) Sam Osborne	5	5	1	2	5	4	5	1	4	5	7	4	4	3	Ret	2	3	2	2	4	3	283
5	(United Kingdom) Sarah Parsons				Ret	3	3	2	3	2	4	2	2	5	4	4	5	6	3				202
6	(United Kingdom) Gary Kounnis																Ret	4	4	3	3	1	77
7	(United Kingdom) Roger Bates				DNS	6	6				7	6	6				Ret	9	Ret				56
8	(United Kingdom) Alan Wichenden										6	5	5				6	8	DNS				50
9	(United Kingdom) James Whelan	3	3	2																			47
10	(United Kingdom) Tom Wood													6	6	3							35
11	(United Kingdom) Keith Issatt																4	7	6				32
12	(United Kingdom) James Ketchell													7	7	6							28
13	(United Kingdom) Jason Foster																			Ret	6	5	21
