= 2017 Renault UK Clio Cup =

The 2017 Renault UK Clio Cup is a multi-event, one make motor racing championship held across England. The championship features a mix of professional motor racing teams and privately funded drivers competing in the Clio Renaultsport 200 Turbo EDC that conform to the technical regulations for the championship. Organised by the British Automobile Racing Club, it forms part of the extensive program of support categories built up around the British Touring Car Championship. It will be the 22nd Renault Clio Cup United Kingdom season and the 42nd of UK motorsport undertaken by Renault and Renault Sport. The first race takes place on 2 April at Brands Hatch on the circuit's Indy configuration and concluded on 1 October at the same venue, utilising the Grand Prix circuit, after eighteen races held at nine meetings.

== Teams and drivers ==
The following teams and drivers are currently signed to run the 2017 season.

Team	No.	Driver	Rounds
JamSport Racing	1	(United Kingdom) Graham Field	2–5
JamSport Racing	41	(United Kingdom) Aaron Thompson	1–8
JamSport Racing	64	(United Kingdom) Jamie Going	6
JamSport Racing	88	(United Kingdom) Lucas Orrock	1–4
JamSport Racing	27	(United Kingdom) Nathan Harrison	1
Team Pyro	27	(United Kingdom) Nathan Harrison	2–9
Team Pyro	2	(United Kingdom) Ash Hand	1–3
Team Pyro	3	(United Kingdom) Ollie Pidgley	1–3
Team Pyro	4	(United Kingdom) Jack McCarthy	All
Team Pyro	6	(United Kingdom) Bradley Burns	7–9
Team Pyro	21	(United Kingdom) Mike Bushell	All
Team Pyro	34	(United Kingdom) Zak Fulk	7–9
Team Pyro	83	(United Kingdom) Kyle Hornby	1–5
Team Pyro	88	(United Kingdom) Lucas Orrock	5–9
WDE Motorsport	5	(United Kingdom) Lee Pattison	All
WDE Motorsport	22	(United Kingdom) Paul Rivett	All
WDE Motorsport	26	(United Kingdom) Paul Streather	2
WDE Motorsport	45	(United Kingdom) Dan Zelos	All
WDE Motorsport	46	(United Kingdom) Sam Osborne	8–9
WDE Motorsport	82	(United Kingdom) Nicolas Hamilton	4–8
WDE Motorsport	94	(United Kingdom) Luke Reade	9
PP Motorsport	7	(United Kingdom) James Colburn	All
STR Norwich	8	(United Kingdom) Shawn Taylor	2, 6–7, 9
Ciceley Motorsport	9	(United Kingdom) Jade Edwards	All
Ciceley Motorsport	41	(United Kingdom) Aaron Thompson	9
Ciceley Motorsport	46	(United Kingdom) Sam Osborne	1–7
Ciceley Motorsport	71	(United Kingdom) Max Coates	All
Ciceley Motorsport	94	(United Kingdom) Luke Reade	1–8
Westbourne Motorsport	10	(United Kingdom) Sam Randon	5–6
Westbourne Motorsport	11	(United Kingdom) Ben Palmer	9
Westbourne Motorsport	13	(Italy) Ambrogio Perfetti	1–2
Westbourne Motorsport	32	(United Kingdom) James Dorlin	All
Westbourne Motorsport	35	(Switzerland) Oscar Rovelli	1–2
Westbourne Motorsport	95	(United Kingdom) Myles Collins	1–3
Mike Ritchie Motorsport	12	(United Kingdom) Brett Lidsey	3, 8–9
DRM	16	(United Kingdom) Daniel Rowbottom	All
SDR Motorsports	28	(United Kingdom) Shayne Deegan	1–2, 4–5
Bob Ross Racing	44	(United Kingdom) James Ross	7

== Race calendar and results ==
The provisional calendar was announced by the championship organisers on 25 August 2016, with no major changes from the previous season.

Round		Circuit	Date	Pole position	Fastest lap	Winning driver	Winning team
1	R1	Brands Hatch (Indy Circuit, Kent)	2 April	(United Kingdom) Mike Bushell	(United Kingdom) James Dorlin	(United Kingdom) Lee Pattison	WDE Motorsport
1	R2	Brands Hatch (Indy Circuit, Kent)	2 April	(United Kingdom) Mike Bushell	(United Kingdom) Shayne Deegan	(United Kingdom) Mike Bushell	Team Pyro
2	R3	Donington Park (National Circuit, Leicestershire)	16 April	(United Kingdom) Dan Zelos	(United Kingdom) Jack McCarthy	(United Kingdom) Max Coates	Ciceley Motorsport
2	R4	Donington Park (National Circuit, Leicestershire)	16 April	(United Kingdom) Lee Pattison	(United Kingdom) Daniel Rowbottom	(United Kingdom) Lee Pattison	WDE Motorsport
3	R5	Thruxton Circuit (Hampshire)	7 May	(United Kingdom) Mike Bushell	(United Kingdom) Mike Bushell	(United Kingdom) Mike Bushell	Team Pyro
3	R6	Thruxton Circuit (Hampshire)	7 May	(United Kingdom) Mike Bushell	(United Kingdom) Dan Zelos	(United Kingdom) James Dorlin	Westbourne Motorsport
4	R7	Oulton Park (Island Circuit, Cheshire)	21 May	(United Kingdom) Mike Bushell	(United Kingdom) Mike Bushell	(United Kingdom) Mike Bushell	Team Pyro
4	R8	Oulton Park (Island Circuit, Cheshire)	21 May	(United Kingdom) Mike Bushell	(United Kingdom) Sam Osborne	(United Kingdom) James Colburn	PP Motorsport
5	R9	Croft Circuit (North Yorkshire)	11 June	(United Kingdom) Mike Bushell	(United Kingdom) Mike Bushell	(United Kingdom) Mike Bushell	Team Pyro
5	R10	Croft Circuit (North Yorkshire)	11 June	(United Kingdom) Mike Bushell	(United Kingdom) Max Coates	(United Kingdom) Mike Bushell	Team Pyro
6	R11	Snetterton Motor Racing Circuit (300 Circuit, Norfolk)	30 July	(United Kingdom) Mike Bushell	(United Kingdom) Paul Rivett	(United Kingdom) Mike Bushell	Team Pyro
6	R12	Snetterton Motor Racing Circuit (300 Circuit, Norfolk)	30 July	(United Kingdom) James Dorlin	(United Kingdom) Max Coates	(United Kingdom) Mike Bushell	Team Pyro
7	R13	Rockingham Motor Speedway (International Super Sports Car Circuit, Northamptonshire)	27 August	(United Kingdom) Max Coates	(United Kingdom) Lee Pattison	(United Kingdom) Max Coates	Ciceley Motorsport
7	R14	Rockingham Motor Speedway (International Super Sports Car Circuit, Northamptonshire)	27 August	(United Kingdom) Max Coates	(United Kingdom) Max Coates	(United Kingdom) Lee Pattison	WDE Motorsport
8	R15	Silverstone Circuit (National Circuit, Northamptonshire)	17 September	(United Kingdom) Lucas Orrock	(United Kingdom) Mike Bushell	(United Kingdom) James Dorlin	Westbourne Motorsport
8	R16	Silverstone Circuit (National Circuit, Northamptonshire)	17 September	(United Kingdom) Mike Bushell	(United Kingdom) Bradley Burns	(United Kingdom) Paul Rivett	WDE Motorsport
9	R17	Brands Hatch (Grand Prix Circuit, Kent)	1 October	(United Kingdom) Mike Bushell	(United Kingdom) Max Coates	(United Kingdom) Mike Bushell	Team Pyro
9	R18	Brands Hatch (Grand Prix Circuit, Kent)	1 October	(United Kingdom) Mike Bushell	(United Kingdom) Zak Fulk	(United Kingdom) Mike Bushell	Team Pyro

== Championship standings ==
=== Drivers' championship ===
Points system
1st	2nd	3rd	4th	5th	6th	7th	8th	9th	10th	11th	12th	13th	14th	15th	16th	17th	18th	19th	20th	Fastest lap
32	28	25	22	20	18	16	14	12	11	10	9	8	7	6	5	4	3	2	1	2

Pos	Driver	BHI		DON		THR		OUL		CRO		SNE		ROC		SIL		BHGP		Total	Pen.	Points
1	(United Kingdom) Mike Bushell	2	1	3	4	1	2	1	2	1	1	1	1	10	2	5	2	1	1	514		514
2	(United Kingdom) Paul Rivett	3	3	9	2	6	3	4	7	4	3	5	3	4	7	3	1	16	8	379	-2	377
3	(United Kingdom) Lee Pattison	1	2	2	1	5	4	8	6	7	6	2	Ret	2	1	8	12	12	7	360		360
4	(United Kingdom) Max Coates	6	6	1	3	8	Ret	6	5	6	2	7	2	1	3	9	4	8	9	360		360
5	(United Kingdom) Daniel Rowbottom	13	10	13	5	4	7	3	3	3	Ret	3	4	6	8	6	3	6	5	322		322
6	(United Kingdom) James Colburn	12	5	10	Ret	2	6	7	1	8	4	9	8	5	4	11	10	3	6	302		302
7	(United Kingdom) Jack McCarthy	5	4	Ret	7	9	10	5	Ret	5	10	Ret	11	3	6	4	6	5	3	272		272
8	(United Kingdom) Dan Zelos	7	8	12	6	10	5	16	4	13	7	6	5	8	9	13	14	2	2	276	-6	270
9	(United Kingdom) James Dorlin	4	16	7	9	3	1	9	Ret	Ret	8	8	6	14	18	1	5	4	18	259	-2	257
10	(United Kingdom) Nathan Harrison	11	18	6	8	7	8	2	Ret	2	5	12	9	11	15	12	11	10	11	228		228
11	(United Kingdom) Lucas Orrock	Ret	11	Ret	DNS	15	Ret	12	14	11	13	4	12	7	5	2	7	7	4	199		199
12	(United Kingdom) Sam Osborne	15	12	5	11	18	Ret	13	10	14	11	Ret	13	15	17	14	16	Ret	15	122	-6	116
13	(United Kingdom) Aaron Thompson	18	14	Ret	13	17	11	Ret	12	10	12	13	10	16	11	16	17	15	14	117	-4	113
14	(United Kingdom) Luke Reade	10	19	Ret	Ret	21	16	11	8	15	Ret	11	Ret	9	13	7	19	14	16	108		108
15	(United Kingdom) Kyle Hornby	16	Ret	11	12	14	12	10	9	12	16									77		77
16	(United Kingdom) Jade Edwards	17	15	17	Ret	20	15	Ret	Ret	9	14	Ret	14	20	10	17	8	Ret	DNS	77	-2	75
17	(United Kingdom) Ash Hand	9	13	4	10	13	9													73		73
18	(United Kingdom) Brett Lidsey					11	Ret									15	9	9	12	49		49
19	(United Kingdom) Ollie Pidgley	8	7	Ret	Ret	12	13													47	-2	45
20	(United Kingdom) Nicolas Hamilton							14	13	Ret	15	15	15	17	20	18	18			44		44
21	(United Kingdom) Zak Fulk													12	16	Ret	15	11	10	43		43
22	(United Kingdom) Graham Field	WD	WD	15	17	19	17	15	11	16	17									41	-2	39
23	(United Kingdom) Bradley Burns													13	14	10	13	Ret	DNS	36		36
24	(United Kingdom) Myles Collins	20	17	8	16	16	14													36		36
25	(United Kingdom) Sam Randon									17	Ret	10	7							31		31
26	(United Kingdom) Shayne Deegan	14	9	Ret	Ret	WD	WD	17	DSQ	Ret	9									37	-10	27
27	(United Kingdom) Shawn Taylor			16	19							14	Ret	19	19			Ret	17	22		22
28	(United Kingdom) Ben Palmer																	13	13	16		16
29	(Italy) Ambrogio Perfetti	21	20	14	15															14		14
30	(United Kingdom) James Ross													18	12					12		12
31	(United Kingdom) Jamie Going											16	16							10		10
32	(Switzerland) Oscar Rovelli	19	21	Ret	14															9		9
33	(United Kingdom) Paul Streather	WD	WD	Ret	18	WD	WD													3	-2	1
Pos	Driver	BHI		DON		THR		OUL		CRO		SNE		ROC		SIL		BHGP		Total	Pen.	Points
