= 2018 Renault UK Clio Cup =

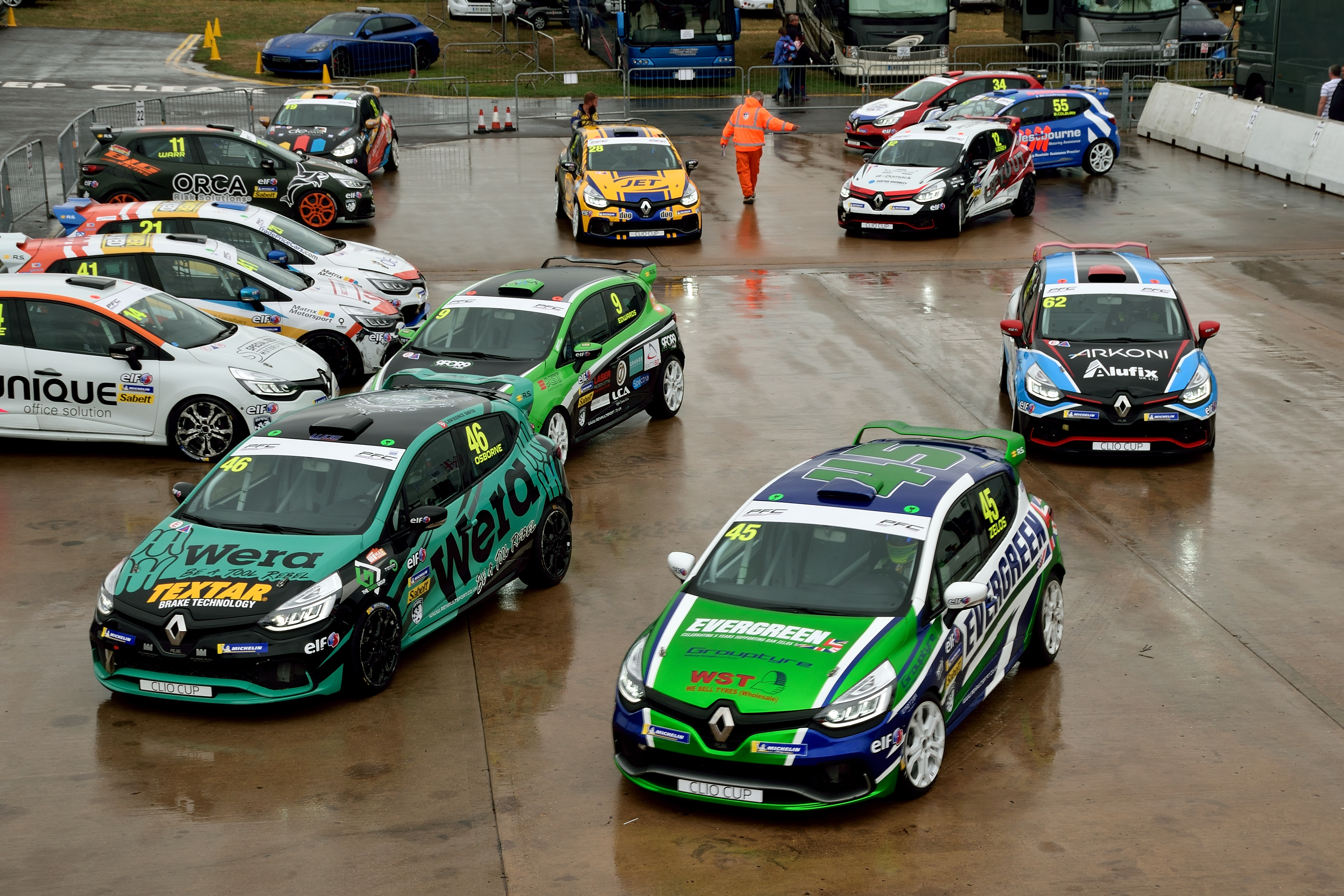
Renault Clio Cup paddock at Rockingham.

The 2018 Renault UK Clio Cup is a multi-event, one make motor racing championship held across England. The championship features a mix of professional motor racing teams and privately funded drivers competing in the Clio Renaultsport 200 Turbo EDC that conform to the technical regulations for the championship. Organised by the British Automobile Racing Club, it forms part of the extensive program of support categories built up around the British Touring Car Championship. It will be the 23rd Renault Clio Cup United Kingdom season and the 43rd of UK motorsport undertaken by Renault and Renault Sport. The first race takes place on 1 April at Brands Hatch on the circuit's Indy configuration and concluded on 30 September at the same venue, utilising the Grand Prix circuit, after eighteen races held at nine meetings.

== Teams and drivers ==
The following teams and drivers are currently signed to run the 2018 season. All teams and drivers were British-registered.

Team	No.	Driver	Rounds
WDE Motorsport	2	Nathan Edwards	1, 6, 9
WDE Motorsport	5	Lee Pattison	1–6, 8–9
WDE Motorsport	22	Paul Rivett	All
WDE Motorsport	28	Nicolas Hamilton	All
WDE Motorsport	45	Dan Zelos	All
WDE Motorsport	46	Sam Osborne	All
Matrix Motorsport	3	Ash Hand	6
Matrix Motorsport	19	Jeff Alden	All
Matrix Motorsport	21	Andy Wilmot	1–5, 7–9
Matrix Motorsport	37	Michael Epps	All
Matrix Motorsport	41	Aaron Thompson	1–8
Team Pyro	4	Jack McCarthy	All
Team Pyro	6	Bradley Burns	All
Team Pyro	16	Daniel Rowbottom	1–4
Team Pyro	34	Zak Fulk	1–7
Team Pyro	71	Max Coates	All
Westbourne Motorsport	7	James Colburn	All
Westbourne Motorsport	32	James Dorlin	All
Westbourne Motorsport	55	Ben Colburn	6–9
M.R.M.	9	Jade Edwards	All
M.R.M.	12	Brett Lidsey	1–3, 5–9
M.R.M.	62	Jack Young	6–9
B.L.G.	11	Luke Warr	2–9
Specialised Motorsport	14	Nicholas Reeve	6–9
D.R.M.	16	Daniel Rowbottom	5–9

== Race calendar ==
Round		Circuit	Date	Pole position	Fastest lap	Winning driver	Winning team
1	R1	Brands Hatch (Indy Circuit, Kent)	7 April	Max Coates	Max Coates	Paul Rivett	WDE Motorsport
1	R2	Brands Hatch (Indy Circuit, Kent)	8 April	Jack McCarthy	Zak Fulk	Max Coates	Team Pyro
2	R3	Donington Park (National Circuit, Leicestershire)	28 April	James Dorlin	James Dorlin	James Dorlin	Westbourne Motorsport
2	R4	Donington Park (National Circuit, Leicestershire)	29 April	Bradley Burns	Bradley Burns	James Dorlin	Westbourne Motorsport
3	R5	Thruxton Circuit (Hampshire)	19 May	Max Coates	James Dorlin	James Dorlin	Westbourne Motorsport
3	R6	Thruxton Circuit (Hampshire)	20 May	Paul Rivett	James Dorlin	James Dorlin	Westbourne Motorsport
4	R7	Oulton Park (Island Circuit, Cheshire)	9 June	James Dorlin	James Dorlin	James Dorlin	Westbourne Motorsport
4	R8	Oulton Park (Island Circuit, Cheshire)	10 June	James Dorlin	Lee Pattison	Max Coates	Team Pyro
5	R9	Croft Circuit (North Yorkshire)	23 June	Max Coates	Paul Rivett	Paul Rivett	WDE Motorsport
5	R10	Croft Circuit (North Yorkshire)	24 June	Max Coates	Lee Pattison	Max Coates	Team Pyro
6	R11	Snetterton Motor Racing Circuit (300 Circuit, Norfolk)	28 July	James Dorlin	Nicholas Reeve	Daniel Rowbottom	D.R.M.
6	R12	Snetterton Motor Racing Circuit (300 Circuit, Norfolk)	29 July	Max Coates	Zak Fulk	Max Coates	Team Pyro
7	R13	Rockingham Motor Speedway (International Super Sports Car Circuit, Northamptonshire)	11 August	Jack McCarthy	Daniel Rowbottom	Daniel Rowbottom	D.R.M.
7	R14	Rockingham Motor Speedway (International Super Sports Car Circuit, Northamptonshire)	12 August	Bradley Burns	Jack McCarthy	Jack McCarthy	Team Pyro
8	R15	Silverstone Circuit (National Circuit, Northamptonshire)	15 September	Bradley Burns	Brett Lidsey	Bradley Burns	Team Pyro
8	R16	Silverstone Circuit (National Circuit, Northamptonshire)	16 September	Bradley Burns	Brett Lidsey	Bradley Burns	Team Pyro
9	R17	Brands Hatch (Grand Prix Circuit, Kent)	29 September	Daniel Rowbottom	Jack Young	Daniel Rowbottom	D.R.M.
9	R18	Brands Hatch (Grand Prix Circuit, Kent)	30 September	Jack Young	Daniel Rowbottom	James Dorlin	Westbourne Motorsport

== Championship standings ==
Points system
**1st**	**2nd**	**3rd**	**4th**	**5th**	**6th**	**7th**	**8th**	**9th**	**10th**	**11th**	**12th**	**13th**	**14th**	**15th**	**16th+**	**Ret**	Leading a lap	Fastest lap
25	22	20	18	16	13	10	8	7	6	5	4	3	2	1	0	0	1	2

Notes

- One point is awarded to a competitor who leads a Renault UK Clio Cup race. This can only be awarded once to a driver that crosses the start/finish line in the lead.
- Two points are awarded to the Driver(s) setting the fastest lap in each round.
- Drivers shall count their results from the total number of races run less one race.
- Each driver’s single dropped score cannot be taken from the final two rounds of the championship.
- Competitors who are excluded from any race must count that excluded race within their total score.

=== Drivers' championship ===
Pos	Driver	BHI		DON		THR		OUL		CRO		SNE		ROC		SIL		BHGP		Total	Drop	Pen.	Points
1	Paul Rivett	1*	2	Ret	4	4	**2**	2	2	1*	2	7	19	2	4	2*	3	4	3	333			333
2	James Dorlin	10	12	**1***	1*	1*	1*	**1***	**3**	6	Ret	**8***	2*	5	12	4	2*	3	1*	316			316
3	Max Coates	**5***	1*	6	6	**2***	3	3	1*	**2**	**1***	11	**1***	Ret	3	Ret	5	5	4	309			309
4	Daniel Rowbottom	3	10	2	11	3*	4	7	DNS	3	4	1*	11	1*	15	3	8	**1***	2	278		2	276
5	Bradley Burns	12	5	9	**2***	11	7	9	4	8	7	2	8	6	**6**	**1***	**1***	2	Ret	242	4		238
6	Michael Epps	6	4	7	9	9	5	8	6	4	6	3	14	8	2	5	10	10	8	211	2		209
7	Jack McCarthy	11	**3**	3	3*	6	6	Ret	8	9	9	12	6	**3***	1*	12	9	8	Ret	199			199
8	Lee Pattison	4	6	Ret	7	5	Ret	4	7	12	3	4	3			7	4	Ret	9	186			186
9	James Colburn	2	Ret	4*	16	8	8	5	5	11	8	10	7	4	11	19	15	7	6	165			165
10	Dan Zelos	8	8	12	12	17	10	6	9	5	5	5	4	Ret	5	8	14	6	7	165			165
11	Zak Fulk	13	7	10	5	10	Ret	11	10	10	12	16	5	12	8					94		2	92
12	Sam Osborne	7	9	8	15	14	9	12	11	16	13	9	Ret	11	7	11	13	17	5	93		2	91
13	Brett Lidsey	Ret	15	5	10	12	Ret			13	10	13	15	9	10	9	7	Ret	10	83			80
14	Jade Edwards	9	16	Ret	8	7	14	10	Ret	7	11	Ret	Ret	13	17	Ret	19	Ret	13	54			54
15	Jack Young											Ret	Ret	7	9	6	6	12	**Ret**	49		3	46
16	Andy Wilmot	14	13	14	13	15	12	13	12	15	14			16	16	14	18	11	14	34			34
17	Nicholas Reeve											18	10	14	13	10	11	Ret	DNS	24		2	22
18	Aaron Thompson	16	17	11	17	13	11	17	15	17	17	15	16	10	14	16	12			27		5	22
19	Ash Hand											6	9							20			20
20	Nicolas Hamilton	Ret	14	13	14	16	13	14	Ret	14	15	14	Ret	19	18	15	17	14	Ret	20			20
21	Ben Colburn											Ret	13	15	Ret	13	16	9	11	19			19
22	Nathan Edwards	15	11									17	12					13	12	17			17
23	Luke Warr			16	18	19	16	15	13	18	16	19	18	17	19	18	21	16	15	5			5
24	Jeff Alden	17	18	15	19	18	15	16	14	Ret	18	Ret	17	18	Ret	17	20	15	16	5		2	3
Pos	Driver	BHI		DON		THR		OUL		CRO		SNE		ROC		SIL		BHGP		Total	Drop	Pen.	Points

Bold – Pole
Italics – Fastest Lap (+2 points)
* – Leading Lap (+1 point)

Colour	Result
Gold	Winner
Silver	Second place
Bronze	Third place
Green	Points classification
Blue	Non-points classification
Blue	Non-classified finish (NC)
Purple	Retired, not classified (Ret)
Red	Did not qualify (DNQ)
Red	Did not pre-qualify (DNPQ)
Black	Disqualified (DSQ)
White	Did not start (DNS)
White	Withdrew (WD)
White	Race cancelled (C)
Blank	Did not practice (DNP)
Blank	Did not arrive (DNA)
Blank	Excluded (EX)
