= Sam Osborne (racing driver) =

British former racing driver (born 1993)

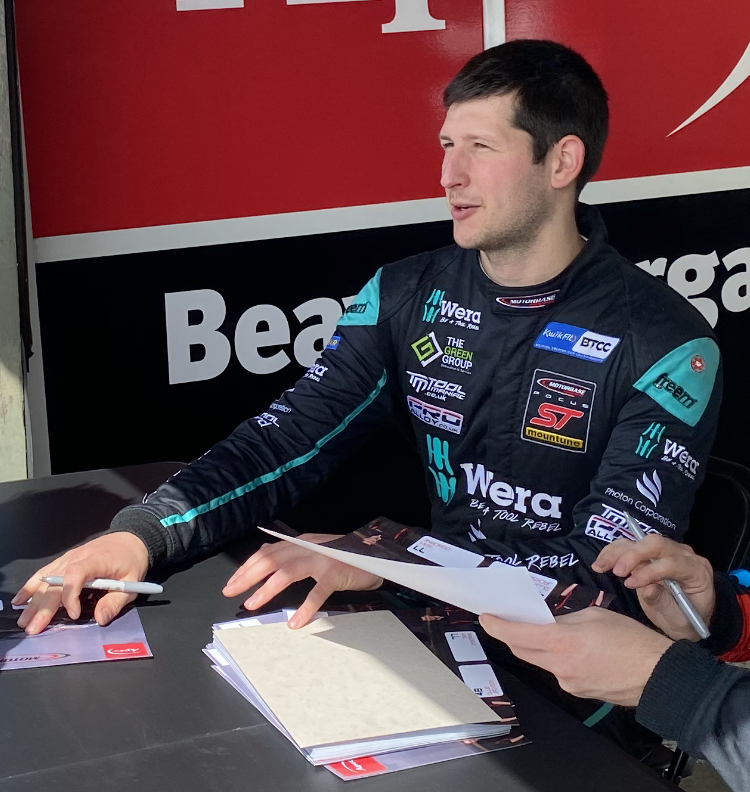
- Osborne at Thruxton Circuit in 2022
- Nationality: (United Kingdom) British
- Born: Samuel Osborne; 24 March 1993 (age 33) Worksop, Nottinghamshire, England

British Touring Car Championship career
- Debut season: 2019
- Current team: NAPA Racing UK
- Car number: 77
- Former teams: Excelr8 Motorsport, AmD Essex
- Starts: 230
- Wins: 1
- Podiums: 2
- Poles: 0
- Fastest laps: 0
- Best finish: 15th in 2024

Previous series
- 2017–2018 2010–2012, 2015–2016: Renault UK Clio Cup; Mini Challenge UK

Samuel Osborne (born 24 March 1993) is a retired British racing driver who last competed in the British Touring Car Championship driving for NAPA Racing UK. He debuted in 2019 after spending the previous two seasons in the Renault UK Clio Cup.

Osborne retired in 2026, leaving family team Alliance Racing at just 33 years old.

== Racing record ==
=== Complete British Touring Car Championship results ===
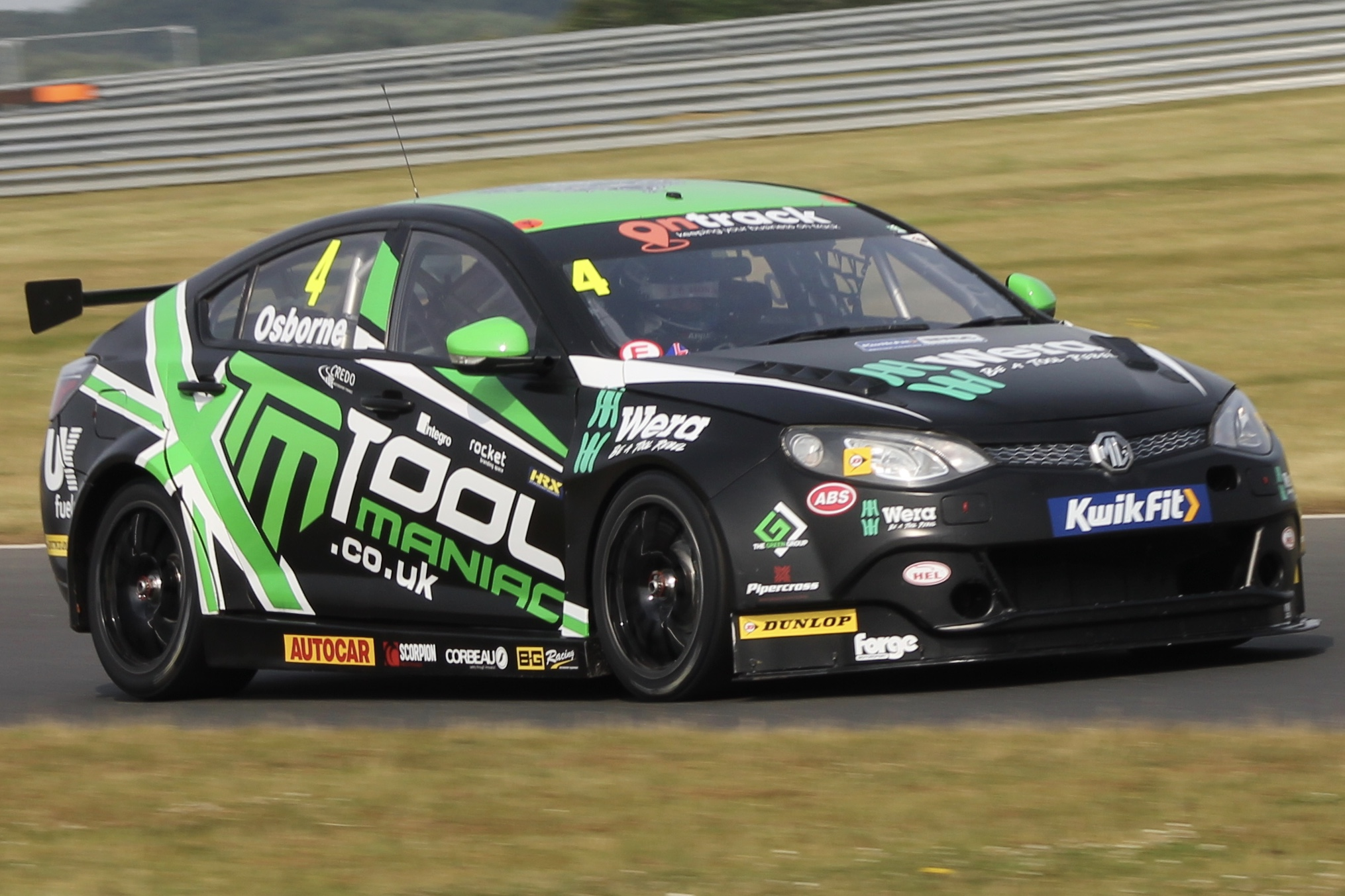
Osborne driving the Excelr8 Motorsport MG6 at Snetterton during the 2019 British Touring Car Championship season.

(key) Races in bold indicate pole position (1 point awarded – 2002–2003 all races, 2004–present just in first race) Races in italics indicate fastest lap (1 point awarded all races) * signifies that driver lead race for at least one lap (1 point awarded – 2002 just in feature races, 2003–present all races; ^{Superscript} number indicates points-scoring qualifying race position)

Year	Team	Car	1	2	3	4	5	6	7	8	9	10	11	12	13	14	15	16	17	18	19	20	21	22	23	24	25	26	27	28	29	30	DC	Points
2019	Excelr8 Motorsport	MG 6 GT	BRH; 1; 24	BRH; 2; 28	BRH; 3 Ret	DON; 1; 22	DON; 2 Ret	DON; 3; 23	THR; 1; 28	THR; 2; 27	THR; 3; 21	CRO; 1 Ret	CRO; 2 Ret	CRO; 3; 21	OUL; 1; 25	OUL; 2 Ret	OUL; 3; 21	SNE; 1; 24	SNE; 2; 24	SNE; 3; 14	THR; 1; 28	THR; 2; 28	THR; 3; 26	KNO; 1; 22	KNO; 2; 25	KNO; 3; 22	SIL; 1; 21	SIL; 2 Ret	SIL; 3; 20	BRH; 1 Ret	BRH; 2; 22	BRH; 3 Ret	30th	2
2020	MB Motorsport accelerated by Blue Square	Honda Civic Type R (FK2)	DON; 1; 7	DON; 2 Ret	DON; 3 Ret	BRH; 1; 24	BRH; 2; 16	BRH; 3; 10	OUL; 1; 16	OUL; 2; 17	OUL; 3; 12	KNO; 1; 19	KNO; 2; 18	KNO; 3 Ret	THR; 1 NC	THR; 2; 22	THR; 3; 20	SIL; 1; 17	SIL; 2; 12	SIL; 3; 20	CRO; 1 Ret	CRO; 2; 14	CRO; 3; 15	SNE; 1; 17	SNE; 2; 15	SNE; 3 Ret	BRH; 1 Ret	BRH; 2; 14	BRH; 3 Ret				19th	29
2021	Racing with Wera & Photon Group	Ford Focus ST	THR; 1; 17	THR; 2; 16	THR; 3; 12	SNE; 1; 19	SNE; 2; 19	SNE; 3; 20	BRH; 1; 21	BRH; 2; 19	BRH; 3; 19	OUL; 1 NC	OUL; 2; 15	OUL; 3 Ret	KNO; 1; 19	KNO; 2; 20	KNO; 3; 17	THR; 1; 22	THR; 2; 19	THR; 3; 19	CRO; 1; 16	CRO; 2; 13	CRO; 3; 22	SIL; 1; 16	SIL; 2; 14	SIL; 3; 25	DON; 1; 12	DON; 2; 16	DON; 3; 19	BRH; 1; 18	BRH; 2; 14	BRH; 3; 17	23rd	16
2022	Apec Racing with Beavis Morgan	Ford Focus ST	DON; 1; 23	DON; 2; 20	DON; 3; 17	BRH; 1; 24	BRH; 2; 20	BRH; 3; 18	THR; 1; 19	THR; 2; 23	THR; 3; 15	OUL; 1; 19	OUL; 2; 21	OUL; 3 Ret	CRO; 1; 21	CRO; 2; 19	CRO; 3; 20	KNO; 1; 17	KNO; 2; 17	KNO; 3; 23	SNE; 1; 21	SNE; 2; 20	SNE; 3; 20	THR; 1; 23	THR; 2; 20	THR; 3 Ret	SIL; 1; 20	SIL; 2; 23	SIL; 3; 21	BRH; 1 Ret	BRH; 2; 22	BRH; 3; 16	25th	1
2023	NAPA Racing UK	Ford Focus ST	DON; 1; 17	DON; 2; 3	DON; 3 Ret	BRH; 1; 14	BRH; 2; 10	BRH; 3; 14	SNE; 1; 13	SNE; 2; 9	SNE; 3; 20	THR; 1; 21	THR; 2; 18	THR; 3; 20	OUL; 1 Ret	OUL; 2; 23	OUL; 3; 14	CRO; 1; 9	CRO; 2; 15	CRO; 3; 17	KNO; 1; 18	KNO; 2; 17	KNO; 3; 13	DON; 1; 15	DON; 2; 15	DON; 3; 9	SIL; 1; 8	SIL; 2; 17	SIL; 3; 17	BRH; 1; 18	BRH; 2 Ret	BRH; 3; 17	19th	65
2024	NAPA Racing UK	Ford Focus ST	DON; 1 Ret	DON; 2 DNS	DON; 3; 15	BRH; 1; 12	BRH; 2; 12	BRH; 3; 16	SNE; 1; 16	SNE; 2; 9	**SNE**; **3**; 14	THR; 1; 16	THR; 2; 15	THR; 3; 13	OUL; 1; 16	OUL; 2; 15	OUL; 3 Ret	CRO; 1; 19	CRO; 2; 13	CRO; 3; 12	KNO; 1; 12	KNO; 2; 15	KNO; 3; 15	DON; 1; 10	DON; 2; 10	DON; 3; 10	SIL; 1; 8	SIL; 2; 10	SIL; 3; 10	BRH; 1; 12	BRH; 2; 10	BRH; 3; 7	15th	93
2025	NAPA Racing UK	Ford Focus ST	DON; 1; 16	DON; 2 DNS	DON; 3; 18	BRH; 1; 8	BRH; 2; 17	BRH; 3; 18	SNE; 1; 13	SNE; 2; 8	SNE; 3; 5	THR; 1 Ret	THR; 2; 20	THR; 3; 11	OUL; 1; 20	OUL; 2; 12	OUL; 3; 10	CRO; 1; 14	CRO; 2; 12	CRO; 3; 7	KNO; 1; 10	KNO; 2; 22	KNO; 3; 16	DON; 1; 16	DON; 2; 13	DON; 3; 14	SIL; 1; 19	SIL; 2; 12	**SIL**; **3**; 1*	BRH; 1; 15	BRH; 2; 12	BRH; 3; 9	16th	108
2026	NAPA Racing UK	Ford Focus Titanium Saloon	DON; 1; 14	DON; 2; 16	DON; 3; 9	BRH; 1; 6^{11}	BRH; 2 Ret	BRH; 3; 14	SNE; 1 DSQ^{10}	SNE; 2; 17	SNE; 3; 13	OUL; 1; 13	OUL; 2; 10	OUL; 3; 13	THR; 1 WD	THR; 2 WD	THR; 3 WD	KNO; 1; 10	KNO; 2; 10	KNO; 3; 21	DON; 1 DNS^{9}	DON; 2 DNS	DON; 3; 14	CRO; 1; 14	CRO; 2; 18	CRO; 3 Ret	SIL; 1 Ret	SIL; 2; 17	SIL; 3; 12	BRH; 1; 15	BRH; 2; 10	BRH; 3; 13	17th	76
