= James Dorlin =

British racing driver (born 1999)

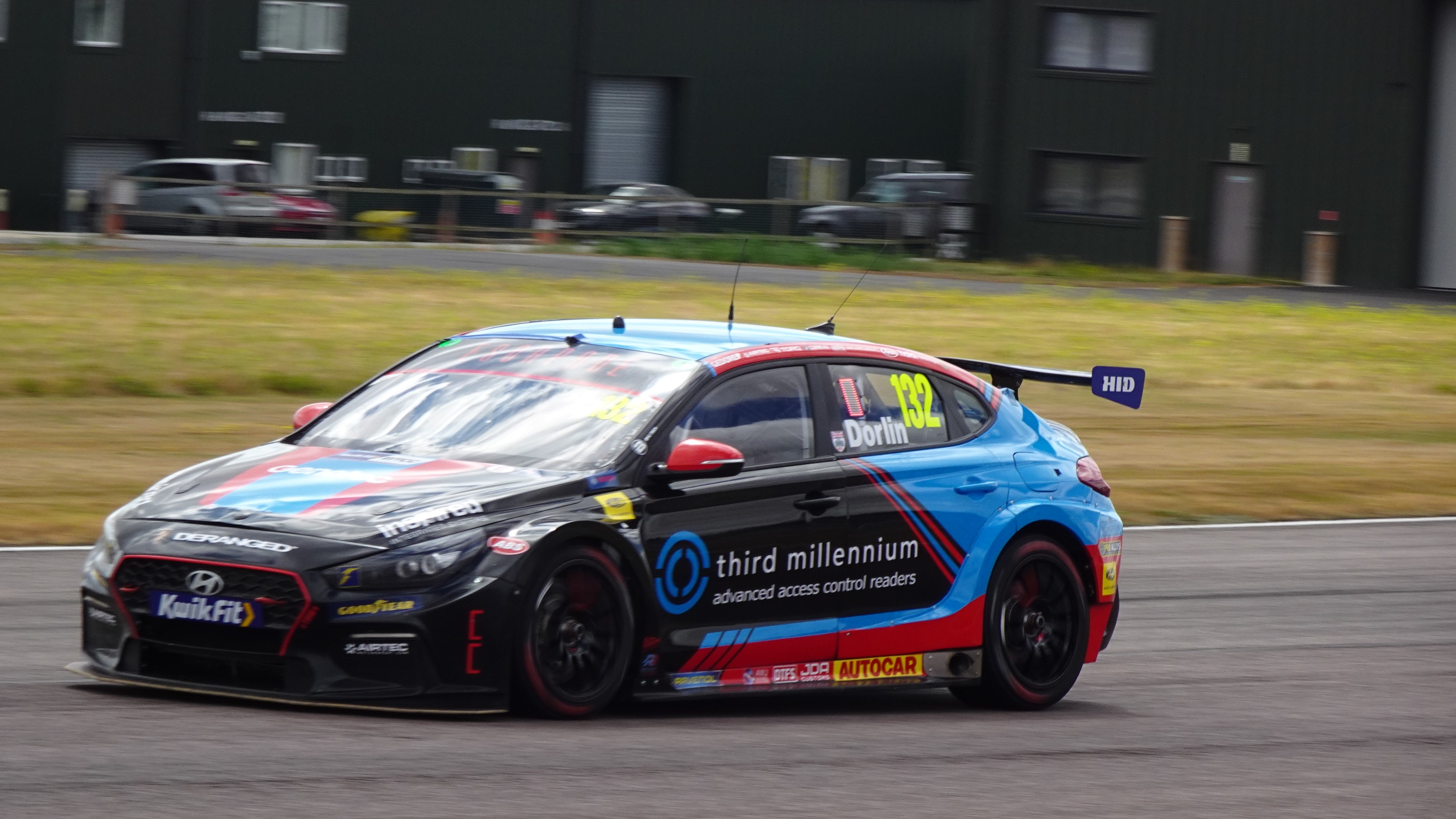
- Dorlin at Thruxton Circuit in 2026
- Nationality: (United Kingdom) British
- Born: James Anthony Dorlin; 18 April 1999 (age 27) South Yorkshire, England

British Touring Car Championship career
- Debut season: 2025
- Current team: Restart Racing
- Car number: 132
- Former teams: Toyota Gazoo Racing UK with IAA
- Starts: 39 (39 entries)
- Wins: 0
- Podiums: 0
- Poles: 0
- Fastest laps: 0
- Best finish: 18th in 2026

Previous series
- 2015-2016 2017-2018 2019-2020, 2022 2020-2021 2021-22 2022: Michelin Clio Cup Series; Renault UK Clio Cup; British GT Championship; Porsche Sprint Challenge GB; Porsche Sprint Challenge Middle East; GT World Challenge Europe

James Anthony Dorlin (born 18 April 1999) is a British racing driver who most recently competed in the British Touring Car Championship for Restart Racing. Dorlin was the winner of the GT3 class of the 2022 British GT Championship.

Dorlin is the winner of the BRDC Rising Star Award. He owns vehicle customisation company JDA Customs, based in Rotherham.

== Career ==
=== British GT Championship ===
Dorlin joined Tolman Motorsport for his rookie season in the British GT Championship as a McLaren Development Driver in 2019. Partnering Josh Smith in the GT4 category, Dorlin would drive a McLaren 570S. The pair achieved one class win, that being at Brands Hatch after beating the HHC Motorsport pair of Dean MacDonald and Callum Pointon. Dorlin and Smith finished sixth in the class' standings.

The following year of 2020, Dorlin only raced in the finale of that year's British GT Championship with Newbridge Motorsport AMR, as a guest driver alongside Alex Toth-Jones.

=== Porsche Carrera Cup Great Britain ===
In 2024, Murrayfield Motorsport signed Dorlin as head driver coach for their ultimately failed Porsche Carrera Cup Great Britain campaign.

=== British Touring Car Championship ===
In 2025, Dorlin joined Toyota Gazoo Racing UK to compete in the British Touring Car Championship after 2 years out of full-time racing, partnering Árón Taylor-Smith, Gordon Shedden and Ronan Pearson. Dorlin endured a difficult 2025 season. as the whole team struggled in the first half of the season, with Dorlin picking up four Jack Sears Trophy wins across the Thruxton and Oulton Park rounds. He scored a best result of 7th twice in the first two Thruxton races, before starting on pole in Race 3 but retired due to mechanical issues. Following the Knockhill round, Dorlin left the team and series and was replaced by Josh Cook.

The following year, Dorlin joined Restart Racing for his second season in the BTCC alongside Chris Smiley. Depsite high results, including two P6 finishes at Thruxton and winning the Goodyear Wingfoot Award, Dorlin left the championship after Knockhill once again, being replaced by the former driver of his Hyundai i30 Fastback N Performance in Daniel Lloyd.

=== Historic car racing ===
After he lost his drive in the BTCC for the second successive year, Dorlin partnered his company, JDA Customs, with Xentek Motorsport to run historic cars under the moniker Heritage Works by Xentek and JDA for 2027 and beyond.

== Racing Record ==
Year	Series	Team	Races	Wins	Poles	F/Laps	Podiums	Points	Position
2013	BARC SAXMAX Championship	?	13	1	1	2	10	258	**2nd**
2014	Junior Saloon Car Championship	?	14	8	5	4	11	286	**1st**
2015	Michelin Clio Cup Series	Westbourne Motorsport	10	0	0	2	?	208	6th
2016	Michelin Clio Cup Series	Westbourne Motorsport	15	8	9	5	?	401	**1st**
2017	Renault UK Clio Cup	Westbourne Motorsport	18	2	1	0	3	257	9th
2018	Renault UK Clio Cup	Westbourne Motorsport	18	6	3	4	10	316	**2nd**
2019	British GT Championship - GT4	Tolman Motorsport	9	1	0	0	3	84.5	6th
2020	British GT Championship - GT4	MSL Powered by Newbridge Motorsport AMR	1	0	0	0	0	0	NC†
2020	Porsche Sprint Challenge GB - Pro	IN2 Racing	12	7	2	4	11	113	**1st**
2021	Porsche Sprint Challenge GB	Redline Racing	2	2	2	2	?	0	NC
2021-22	Porsche Sprint Challenge Middle East	Lechner Racing	11	0	0	0	?	124.5	4th
2022	British GT Championship - GT3	Redline Racing	7	0	0	0	0	82	6th
2022	British GT Championship - GT3	Allied Racing operated by Redline	1	0	0	0	0	82	6th
2022	GT World Challenge Europe Endurance Cup	Barwell Motorsport	1	0	0	0	0	0	NC
2022	GT World Challenge Europe Endurance Cup	Allied Racing	1	0	0	0	0	0	NC
2025	British Touring Car Championship	Toyota Gazoo Racing UK with IAA	21	0	0	0	0	47	19th
2026	British Touring Car Championship	Restart Racing	18	0	0	0	0	69	18th

=== Complete Renault UK Clio Cup Results ===
Year	Team	1	2	3	4	5	6	7	8	9	10	11	12	13	14	15	16	17	18	DC	Points
2017	Westbourne Motorsport	BRH; 1; 4	BRH; 2; 16	DON; 1; 7	DON; 2; 9	THR; 1; 3	THR; 2; 1	OUL; 1; 9	OUL; 2 Ret	CRO; 1 Ret	CRO; 2; 8	SNE; 1; 8	**SNE**; **2**; 6	ROC; 1; 14	ROC; 2; 18	SIL; 1; 1	SIL; 2; 5	BRH; 1; 4	BRH; 2; 18	9th	257
2018	Westbourne Motorsport	BRH; 1; 10	BRH; 2; 12	**DON**; **1**; 1	DON; 2; 1	THR; 1; 1	THR; 2; 1	**OUL**; **1**; 1	**OUL**; **2**; 3	CRO; 1; 6	CRO; 2 Ret	**SNE**; **1**; 8	SNE; 2; 2	ROC; 1; 5	ROC; 2; 12	SIL; 1; 4	SIL; 2; 2	BRH; 1; 3	BRH; 2; 1	2nd	316

=== Complete British GT Championship Results ===
Year	Team	Car	Class	1	2	3	4	5	6	7	8	9	DC	Points
2019	Tolman Motorsport	McLaren 570S GT4	GT4	OUL; 1; 13	OUL; 2; 26	SNE; 1; 13	SNE; 2; 22	SIL; 1; 34	DON; 1 Ret	SPA; 1; 20	BRH; 1; 13	DON; 1; 22	6th	84.5
2020	MSL Powered by Newbridge Motorsport AMR	Aston Martin Vantage AMR GT4	GT4	OUL; 1	OUL; 2	DON; 1	DON; 2	BRH; 1	DON; 1	SNE; 1	SNE; 2	SIL; 1; 24	NC†	0†
2022	Redline Racing	Lamborghini Huracan GT3 Evo	GT3	OUL; 1; 14	OUL; 2; 8	SIL; 1; 4	DON; 1; 5	SNE; 1; 8	SNE; 2; 4		BRH; 1; 23	DON; 1	6th	82
2022	Allied Racing operated by Redline	Porsche 911 GT3 R	GT3							SPA; 1; 5			6th	82

^{†} As Dorlin was a guest driver, he was ineligible for points.

=== Complete British Touring Car Championship Results ===
(key) Races in bold indicate pole position (1 point awarded – 2002–2003 all races, 2004–present just in first race) Races in italics indicate fastest lap (1 point awarded all races) * signifies that driver lead race for at least one lap (1 point awarded – 2002 just in feature races, 2003–present all races; ^{Superscript} number indicates points-scoring qualifying race position)

Year	Team	Car	1	2	3	4	5	6	7	8	9	10	11	12	13	14	15	16	17	18	19	20	21	22	23	24	25	26	27	28	29	30	DC	Points
2025	Toyota Gazoo Racing UK with IAA	Toyota Corolla GR Sport	DON; 1 Ret	DON; 2; 14	DON; 3; 21	BRH; 1; 17	BRH; 2; 18	BRH; 3; 11	SNE; 1; 15	SNE; 2; 14	SNE; 3 Ret	THR; 1; 7	THR; 2; 7	**THR**; **3** Ret	OUL; 1; 10	OUL; 2; 13	OUL; 3; 8	CRO; 1; 18	CRO; 2; 16	CRO; 3 Ret	KNO; 1; 18	KNO; 2; 14	KNO; 3; 17	DON; 1	DON; 2	DON; 3	SIL; 1	SIL; 2	SIL; 3	BRH; 1	BRH; 2	BRH; 3	19th	47
2026	Restart Racing	Hyundai i30 Fastback N Performance	DON; 1; 13^{15}	DON; 2; 17	DON; 3; 15	BRH; 1; 14	BRH; 2; 8	**BRH**; **3**; **8**	SNE; 1; 9^{9}	SNE; 2; 20	SNE; 3; 18	OUL; 1; 17	OUL; 2; 13	OUL; 3; 14	THR; 1; 9^{10}	THR; 2; 6	**THR**; **3**; 6	KNO; 1; 15^{15}	KNO; 2; 14	KNO; 3; 15	DON; 1	DON; 2	DON; 3	CRO; 1	CRO; 2	CRO; 3	SIL; 1	SIL; 2	SIL; 3	BRH; 1	BRH; 2	BRH; 3	18th	69
