= 2020 British GT Championship =

Sports car racing season

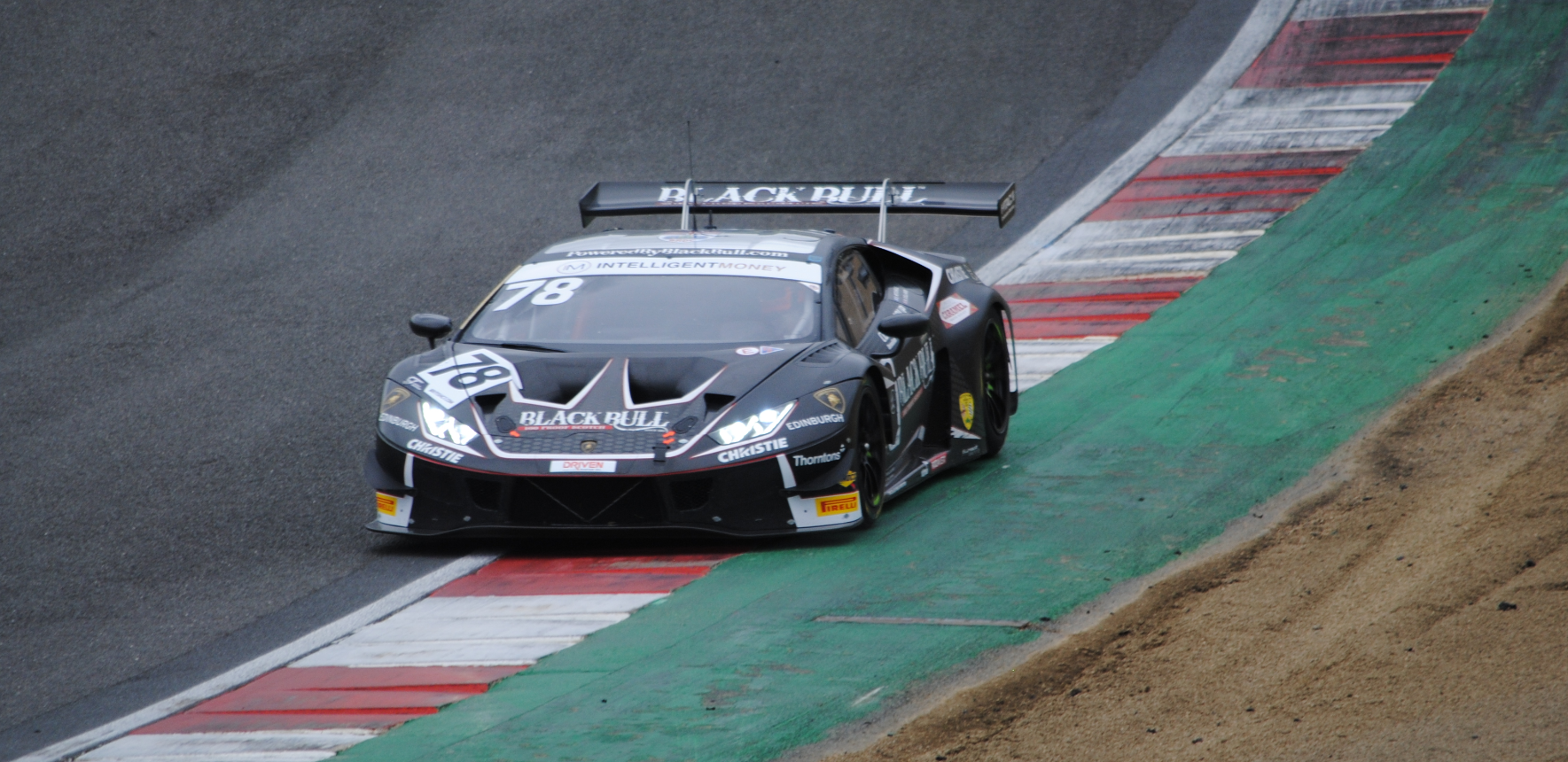
GT3 champions, Rob Collard and Sandy Mitchell.

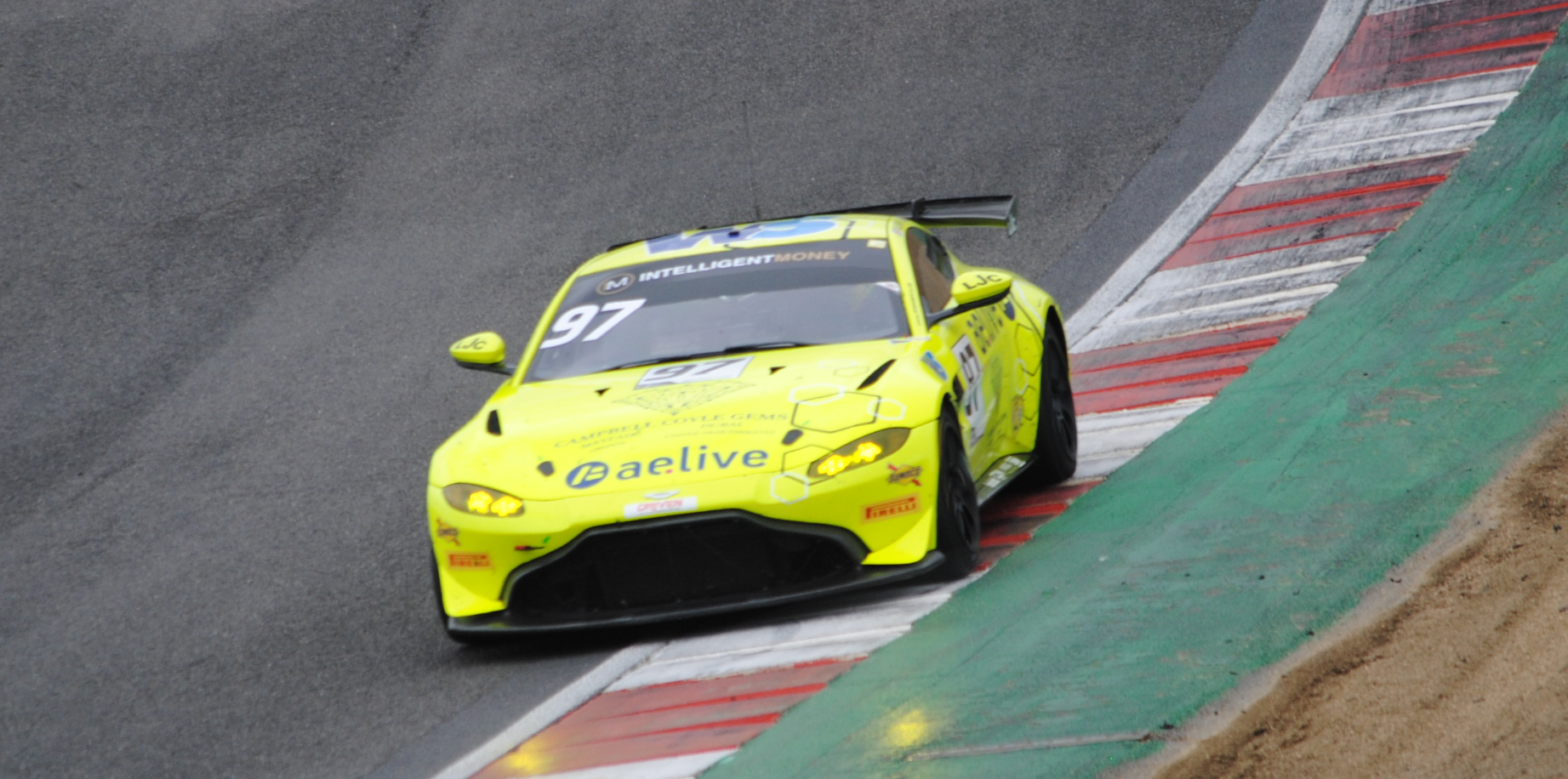
GT4 champions, Jamie Caroline and Daniel Vaughan.

The 2020 British GT Championship (known for sponsorship reasons as the 2020 Intelligent Money British GT Championship) was the 28th British GT Championship, a sports car championship promoted by the Stéphane Ratel Organisation (SRO). The season began on 2 August at Oulton Park and finished on 8 November at Silverstone, after nine races held over seven meetings.

== Calendar ==
The season opened at Oulton Park on 2 August and ended at Silverstone on 8 November.

Round	Circuit	Length	Date
1	(United Kingdom) Oulton Park, Cheshire	60 min	1–2 August
2	(United Kingdom) Oulton Park, Cheshire	60 min	1–2 August
3	(United Kingdom) Donington Park, Leicestershire	120 min	15–16 August
4	(United Kingdom) Donington Park, Leicestershire	60 min	15–16 August
5	(United Kingdom) Brands Hatch, Kent	120 min	29–30 August
6	(United Kingdom) Donington Park, Leicestershire	180 min	19–20 September
7	(United Kingdom) Snetterton Circuit, Norfolk	60 min	3–4 October
8	(United Kingdom) Snetterton Circuit, Norfolk	60 min	3–4 October
9	(United Kingdom) Silverstone Circuit, Northamptonshire	180 min	7–8 November
Cancelled Races
	Circuit de Spa-Francorchamps, Spa, Belgium	Cancelled (Note: Originally scheduled for 19 July 2020 but was cancelled due to COVID-19 pandemic)	

== Entry list ==
=== GT3 ===
Team	Car	Engine	No.	Drivers	Class		Rounds
Team	Car	Engine	No.	Drivers	Car	Driver	Rounds
(United Kingdom) Garage 59	Aston Martin Vantage AMR GT3	Aston Martin 4.0 L Turbo V8	1	(United Kingdom) Jonathan Adam	GT3	PA	9
(United Kingdom) Garage 59	Aston Martin Vantage AMR GT3	Aston Martin 4.0 L Turbo V8	1	(Sweden) Alexander West	GT3	PA	9
(United Kingdom) Jenson Team Rocket RJN	McLaren 720S GT3	McLaren M840T 4.0 L Turbo V8	2	(United Kingdom) James Baldwin	GT3	S	All
(United Kingdom) Jenson Team Rocket RJN	McLaren 720S GT3	McLaren M840T 4.0 L Turbo V8	2	(United Kingdom) Michael O'Brien	GT3	S	All
(United Kingdom) Jenson Team Rocket RJN	McLaren 720S GT3	McLaren M840T 4.0 L Turbo V8	3	(United Kingdom) Chris Buncombe	GT3	PA	9
(United Kingdom) Jenson Team Rocket RJN	McLaren 720S GT3	McLaren M840T 4.0 L Turbo V8	3	(United Kingdom) Jenson Button	GT3	PA	9
(United Kingdom) Ram Racing	Mercedes-AMG GT3 Evo	Mercedes-AMG M159 6.2 L V8	6	(Netherlands) Yelmer Buurman	GT3	PA	All
(United Kingdom) Ram Racing	Mercedes-AMG GT3 Evo	Mercedes-AMG M159 6.2 L V8	6	(United Kingdom) Ian Loggie	GT3	PA	All
(United Kingdom) Ram Racing	Mercedes-AMG GT3 Evo	Mercedes-AMG M159 6.2 L V8	69	(United Kingdom) Sam De Haan	GT3	S	All
(United Kingdom) Ram Racing	Mercedes-AMG GT3 Evo	Mercedes-AMG M159 6.2 L V8	69	(Finland) Patrick Kujala	GT3	S	All
(United Kingdom) Beechdean AMR	Aston Martin Vantage AMR GT3	Aston Martin 4.0 L Turbo V8	7	(United Kingdom) Andrew Howard	GT3	PA	5, 9
(United Kingdom) Beechdean AMR	Aston Martin Vantage AMR GT3	Aston Martin 4.0 L Turbo V8	7	(United Kingdom) Jonathan Adam	GT3	PA	5
(United Kingdom) Beechdean AMR	Aston Martin Vantage AMR GT3	Aston Martin 4.0 L Turbo V8	7	(Republic of Ireland) Charlie Eastwood	GT3	PA	9
(United Kingdom) Team ABBA Racing	Mercedes-AMG GT3	Mercedes-AMG M159 6.2 L V8	8	(United Kingdom) Richard Neary	GT3	PA	All
(United Kingdom) Team ABBA Racing	Mercedes-AMG GT3	Mercedes-AMG M159 6.2 L V8	8	(United Kingdom) Sam Neary	GT3	PA	All
(Bahrain) 2 Seas Motorsport	McLaren 720S GT3	McLaren M840T 4.0 L Turbo V8	9	(United Kingdom) Angus Fender	GT3	S	All
(Bahrain) 2 Seas Motorsport	McLaren 720S GT3	McLaren M840T 4.0 L Turbo V8	9	(United Kingdom) Dean MacDonald	GT3	S	All
(Bahrain) 2 Seas Motorsport	McLaren 720S GT3	McLaren M840T 4.0 L Turbo V8	10	(United Kingdom) Jack Mitchell	GT3	S	All
(Bahrain) 2 Seas Motorsport	McLaren 720S GT3	McLaren M840T 4.0 L Turbo V8	10	(United Kingdom) Jordan Witt	GT3	S	All
(Bahrain) 2 Seas Motorsport	McLaren 720S GT3	McLaren M840T 4.0 L Turbo V8	11	(Oman) Al Faisal Al Zubair	GT3	S	9
(Bahrain) 2 Seas Motorsport	McLaren 720S GT3	McLaren M840T 4.0 L Turbo V8	11	(Croatia) Martin Kodrić	GT3	S	9
(United Kingdom) Scott Sport	Ferrari 488 Challenge Evo	Ferrari 3.9L Turbo V8	13	(United Kingdom) John Dhillon	GTC	PA	9
(United Kingdom) Scott Sport	Ferrari 488 Challenge Evo	Ferrari 3.9L Turbo V8	13	(United Kingdom) Phil Quaife	GTC	PA	9
(United Kingdom) FF Corse	Ferrari 488 Challenge Evo	Ferrari 3.9L Turbo V8	15	(Belgium) Laurent de Meeus	GTC	PA	9
(United Kingdom) FF Corse	Ferrari 488 Challenge Evo	Ferrari 3.9L Turbo V8	15	(United Kingdom) Jamie Stanley	GTC	PA	9
(United Kingdom) Team Parker Racing	Porsche 911 GT3 Cup	Porsche 4.0 L Flat-6	16	(United Kingdom) Justin Armstrong	GTC	PA	9
(United Kingdom) Team Parker Racing	Porsche 911 GT3 Cup	Porsche 4.0 L Flat-6	16	(United Kingdom) Ryan Ratcliffe	GTC	PA	9
(United Kingdom) Team Parker Racing	Porsche 911 GT3 Cup	Porsche 4.0 L Flat-6	17	(United Kingdom) Tim Bridgman	GTC	PA	9
(United Kingdom) Team Parker Racing	Porsche 911 GT3 Cup	Porsche 4.0 L Flat-6	17	(Republic of Ireland) Karl Leonard	GTC	PA	9
(United Kingdom) Team Parker Racing	Bentley Continental GT3	Bentley 4.0 L Turbo V8	66	(United Kingdom) Nick Jones	GT3	PA	1–8
(United Kingdom) Team Parker Racing	Bentley Continental GT3	Bentley 4.0 L Turbo V8	66	(United Kingdom) Scott Malvern	GT3	PA	1–8
(United Kingdom) WPI Motorsport	Lamborghini Huracán GT3 Evo	Lamborghini 5.2 L V10	18	(United Kingdom) Michael Igoe	GT3	PA	All
(United Kingdom) WPI Motorsport	Lamborghini Huracán GT3 Evo	Lamborghini 5.2 L V10	18	(Denmark) Dennis Lind	GT3	PA	1–2
(United Kingdom) WPI Motorsport	Lamborghini Huracán GT3 Evo	Lamborghini 5.2 L V10	18	(Italy) Andrea Caldarelli	GT3	PA	3–4, 7–9
(United Kingdom) WPI Motorsport	Lamborghini Huracán GT3 Evo	Lamborghini 5.2 L V10	18	(France) Franck Perera	GT3	PA	5
(United Kingdom) WPI Motorsport	Lamborghini Huracán GT3 Evo	Lamborghini 5.2 L V10	18	(Italy) Marco Mapelli	GT3	PA	6
(United Kingdom) Balfe Motorsport	McLaren 720S GT3	McLaren M840T 4.0 L Turbo V8	19	(United Kingdom) Shaun Balfe	GT3	PA	9
(United Kingdom) Balfe Motorsport	McLaren 720S GT3	McLaren M840T 4.0 L Turbo V8	19	(United Kingdom) Rob Bell	GT3	PA	9
(United Kingdom) Balfe Motorsport	McLaren 720S GT3	McLaren M840T 4.0 L Turbo V8	36	(United Kingdom) Joe Osborne	GT3	PA	3–4, 6–8
(United Kingdom) Balfe Motorsport	McLaren 720S GT3	McLaren M840T 4.0 L Turbo V8	36	(United Kingdom) Stewart Proctor	GT3	PA	3–4, 6–8
(United Kingdom) Simon Green Motorsport	Ferrari 488 Challenge Evo	Ferrari 3.9L Turbo V8	24	(United Kingdom) Lee Frost	GTC	PA	9
(United Kingdom) Simon Green Motorsport	Ferrari 488 Challenge Evo	Ferrari 3.9L Turbo V8	24	(United Kingdom) Lucky Khera	GTC	PA	9
(United Kingdom) Simon Green Motorsport	Ferrari 488 Challenge Evo	Ferrari 3.9L Turbo V8	24	(United Kingdom) Ross Wylie	GTC	PA	9
(United Kingdom) Ultimate Speed	Aston Martin Vantage AMR GT3	Aston Martin 4.0 L Turbo V8	26	(United Kingdom) Michael Brown	GT3	PA	6, 9
(United Kingdom) Ultimate Speed	Aston Martin Vantage AMR GT3	Aston Martin 4.0 L Turbo V8	26	(United Kingdom) Matt Manderson	GT3	PA	6, 9
(United Kingdom) Steller Performance	Audi R8 LMS Evo	Audi 5.2L V10	30	(United Kingdom) Sennan Fielding	GT3	S	5–6, 9
(United Kingdom) Steller Performance	Audi R8 LMS Evo	Audi 5.2L V10	30	(United Kingdom) Richard Williams	GT3	S	5–6, 9
(United Kingdom) TF Sport	Aston Martin Vantage AMR GT3	Aston Martin 4.0 L Turbo V8	38	(United Kingdom) Tom Canning	GT3	PA	9
(United Kingdom) TF Sport	Aston Martin Vantage AMR GT3	Aston Martin 4.0 L Turbo V8	38	(Italy) Giacomo Petrobelli	GT3	PA	9
(Italy) AF Corse	Ferrari 488 GT3	Ferrari 3.9 L Twin-Turbo V8	51	(United Kingdom) Duncan Cameron	GT3	PA	1–4, 7–8
(Italy) AF Corse	Ferrari 488 GT3	Ferrari 3.9 L Twin-Turbo V8	51	(Republic of Ireland) Matt Griffin	GT3	PA	1–4, 7–8
(United Kingdom) JMH Automotive	Lamborghini Huracán GT3 Evo	Lamborghini 5.2 L V10	55	(United Kingdom) Marcus Clutton	GT3	PA	1–2
(United Kingdom) JMH Automotive	Lamborghini Huracán GT3 Evo	Lamborghini 5.2 L V10	55	(United Kingdom) John Seale	GT3	PA	1–2
(United Kingdom) Optimum Motorsport	McLaren 720S GT3	McLaren M840T 4.0 L Turbo V8	68	(United Kingdom) Mark Crader	GT3	PA	9
(United Kingdom) Optimum Motorsport	McLaren 720S GT3	McLaren M840T 4.0 L Turbo V8	68	(United Kingdom) Alexander Mortimer	GT3	PA	9
(United Kingdom) Optimum Motorsport	McLaren 720S GT3	McLaren M840T 4.0 L Turbo V8	77	(United States) Brendan Iribe	GT3	PA	9
(United Kingdom) Optimum Motorsport	McLaren 720S GT3	McLaren M840T 4.0 L Turbo V8	77	(United Kingdom) Ollie Millroy	GT3	PA	9
(United Kingdom) Optimum Motorsport	McLaren 720S GT3	McLaren M840T 4.0 L Turbo V8	96	(United Kingdom) Lewis Proctor	GT3	S	All
(United Kingdom) Optimum Motorsport	McLaren 720S GT3	McLaren M840T 4.0 L Turbo V8	96	(United Kingdom) Ollie Wilkinson	GT3	S	All
(United Kingdom) Barwell Motorsport	Lamborghini Huracán GT3 Evo	Lamborghini 5.2 L V10	72	(United Kingdom) Adam Balon	GT3	PA	All
(United Kingdom) Barwell Motorsport	Lamborghini Huracán GT3 Evo	Lamborghini 5.2 L V10	72	(United Kingdom) Phil Keen	GT3	PA	All
(United Kingdom) Barwell Motorsport	Lamborghini Huracán GT3 Evo	Lamborghini 5.2 L V10	78	(United Kingdom) Rob Collard	GT3	S	All
(United Kingdom) Barwell Motorsport	Lamborghini Huracán GT3 Evo	Lamborghini 5.2 L V10	78	(United Kingdom) Sandy Mitchell	GT3	S	All

Icon	Class
Car
GT3	GT3 Cars
GTC	GTC Cars
Drivers
PA	Pro-Am Cup
S	Silver Cup
Am	Am Cup

=== GT4 ===
Team	Car	Engine	No.	Drivers	Class	Rounds
(United Kingdom) Balfe Motorsport	McLaren 570S GT4	McLaren 3.8 L Turbo V8	20	(Germany) Lars Dahmann	PA	9
(United Kingdom) Balfe Motorsport	McLaren 570S GT4	McLaren 3.8 L Turbo V8	20	(United Kingdom) Charlie Hollings	PA	9
(United Kingdom) Balfe Motorsport	McLaren 570S GT4	McLaren 3.8 L Turbo V8	21	(Sweden) Mia Flewitt	PA	All
(United Kingdom) Balfe Motorsport	McLaren 570S GT4	McLaren 3.8 L Turbo V8	21	(United Kingdom) Euan Hankey	PA	All
(United Kingdom) Balfe Motorsport	McLaren 570S GT4	McLaren 3.8 L Turbo V8	22	(United Kingdom) Warren Hughes	PA	6
(United Kingdom) Balfe Motorsport	McLaren 570S GT4	McLaren 3.8 L Turbo V8	22	(Switzerland) Jan Klingelnberg	PA	6
(United Kingdom) Speedworks Motorsport	Toyota GR Supra GT4	BMW B58B30 3.0L Twin-Turbo I6	23	(United Kingdom) James Kell	S	All
(United Kingdom) Speedworks Motorsport	Toyota GR Supra GT4	BMW B58B30 3.0L Twin-Turbo I6	23	(United Kingdom) Sam Smelt	S	All
(United Kingdom) Team Tegiwa	BMW M4 GT4	BMW N55 3.0 L Twin-Turbo I6	33	(United Kingdom) Luke Sedzikowski	Am	1–2, 6
(United Kingdom) Team Tegiwa	BMW M4 GT4	BMW N55 3.0 L Twin-Turbo I6	33	(United Kingdom) David Whitmore	Am	1–2, 6
(United Kingdom) Century Motorsport	BMW M4 GT4	BMW N55 3.0 L Twin-Turbo I6	42	(United Kingdom) Andrew Gordon-Colebrooke	S	5, 7–8
(United Kingdom) Century Motorsport	BMW M4 GT4	BMW N55 3.0 L Twin-Turbo I6	42	(United Kingdom) Ben Green	S	5
(United Kingdom) Century Motorsport	BMW M4 GT4	BMW N55 3.0 L Twin-Turbo I6	42	(United Kingdom) Ben Tuck	S	7–8
(United Kingdom) Century Motorsport	BMW M4 GT4	BMW N55 3.0 L Twin-Turbo I6	42	(United Kingdom) Andrew Gordon-Colebrooke	PA	9
(United Kingdom) Century Motorsport	BMW M4 GT4	BMW N55 3.0 L Twin-Turbo I6	42	(United Kingdom) Rob Wheldon	PA	9
(United Kingdom) Century Motorsport	BMW M4 GT4	BMW N55 3.0 L Twin-Turbo I6	43			
(United Kingdom) Century Motorsport	BMW M4 GT4	BMW N55 3.0 L Twin-Turbo I6	43	(Canada) Ben Hurst	S	All
(United Kingdom) Century Motorsport	BMW M4 GT4	BMW N55 3.0 L Twin-Turbo I6	43	(United Kingdom) Andrew Gordon-Colebrooke	S	1–4
(United Kingdom) Century Motorsport	BMW M4 GT4	BMW N55 3.0 L Twin-Turbo I6	43	(United Kingdom) Adam Hatfield	S	5–9
(United Kingdom) HHC Motorsport	McLaren 570S GT4	McLaren 3.8 L Turbo V8	57	(United Kingdom) Gus Bowers	S	All
(United Kingdom) HHC Motorsport	McLaren 570S GT4	McLaren 3.8 L Turbo V8	57	(United Kingdom) Chris Wesemael	S	All
(United Kingdom) HHC Motorsport	McLaren 570S GT4	McLaren 3.8 L Turbo V8	58	(United Kingdom) Jordan Collard	S	All
(United Kingdom) HHC Motorsport	McLaren 570S GT4	McLaren 3.8 L Turbo V8	58	(Denmark) Patrik Matthiesen	S	All
(United Kingdom) Academy Motorsports	Ford Mustang GT4	Ford 5.2 L Voodoo V8	61	(United Kingdom) Matt Cowley	S	All
(United Kingdom) Academy Motorsports	Ford Mustang GT4	Ford 5.2 L Voodoo V8	61	(United Kingdom) Jordan Albert	S	1–6
(United Kingdom) Academy Motorsports	Ford Mustang GT4	Ford 5.2 L Voodoo V8	61	(United Kingdom) Will Moore	S	7–9
(United Kingdom) Team Parker Racing	Mercedes-AMG GT4	Mercedes-AMG M178 4.0 L V8	66	(United Kingdom) Nick Jones	PA	9
(United Kingdom) Team Parker Racing	Mercedes-AMG GT4	Mercedes-AMG M178 4.0 L V8	66	(United Kingdom) Scott Malvern	PA	9
(United Kingdom) TF Sport	Aston Martin Vantage AMR GT4	Aston Martin 4.0 L Turbo V8	95	(Republic of Ireland) Connor O’Brien	S	All
(United Kingdom) TF Sport	Aston Martin Vantage AMR GT4	Aston Martin 4.0 L Turbo V8	95	(United Kingdom) Patrick Kibble	S	All
(United Kingdom) TF Sport	Aston Martin Vantage AMR GT4	Aston Martin 4.0 L Turbo V8	97	(United Kingdom) Jamie Caroline	S	All
(United Kingdom) TF Sport	Aston Martin Vantage AMR GT4	Aston Martin 4.0 L Turbo V8	97	(United Kingdom) Daniel Vaughan	S	All
(United Kingdom) MSL Powered by Newbridge Motorsport AMR	Aston Martin Vantage AMR GT4	Aston Martin 4.0 L Turbo V8	98	(United Kingdom) James Dorlin	S	9
(United Kingdom) MSL Powered by Newbridge Motorsport AMR	Aston Martin Vantage AMR GT4	Aston Martin 4.0 L Turbo V8	98	(United Kingdom) Alex Toth-Jones	S	9

Icon	Class
PA	Pro-Am Cup
S	Silver Cup
Am	Am Cup

== Race results ==
Bold indicates overall winner for each car class (GT3 and GT4).

=== GT3 ===
Event	Circuit	Pole position	Pro-Am winners	Silver winners	GTC winners
1	Oulton Park	(United Kingdom) No. 96 Optimum Motorsport	(United Kingdom) No. 6 Ram Racing	**(United Kingdom) No. 2 Jenson Team Rocket RJN**	No Entrants
1	Oulton Park	(United Kingdom) Lewis Proctor (United Kingdom) Ollie Wilkinson	(Netherlands) Yelmer Buurman (United Kingdom) Ian Loggie	**(United Kingdom) James Baldwin** **(United Kingdom) Michael O'Brien**	No Entrants
2	Oulton Park	(United Kingdom) No. 72 Barwell Motorsport	**(United Kingdom) No. 72 Barwell Motorsport**	(United Kingdom) No. 78 Barwell Motorsport	No Entrants
2	Oulton Park	(United Kingdom) Adam Balon (United Kingdom) Phil Keen	**(United Kingdom) Adam Balon** **(United Kingdom) Phil Keen**	(United Kingdom) Rob Collard (United Kingdom) Sandy Mitchell	No Entrants
3	Donington Park	(United Kingdom) No. 2 Jenson Team Rocket RJN	**(United Kingdom) No. 18 WPI Motorsport**	(United Kingdom) No. 69 Ram Racing	No Entrants
3	Donington Park	(United Kingdom) James Baldwin (United Kingdom) Michael O'Brien	**(Italy) Andrea Caldarelli** **(United Kingdom) Michael Igoe**	(United Kingdom) Sam De Haan (Finland) Patrick Kujala	No Entrants
4	Donington Park	(United Kingdom) No. 36 Balfe Motorsport	**(United Kingdom) No. 66 Team Parker Racing**	(Bahrain) No. 10 2 Seas Motorsport	No Entrants
4	Donington Park	(United Kingdom) Joe Osborne (United Kingdom) Stewart Proctor	**(United Kingdom) Nick Jones** **(United Kingdom) Scott Malvern**	(United Kingdom) Jack Mitchell (United Kingdom) Jordan Witt	No Entrants
5	Brands Hatch	(United Kingdom) No. 2 Jenson Team Rocket RJN	(United Kingdom) No. 6 Ram Racing	**(United Kingdom) No. 78 Barwell Motorsport**	No Entrants
5	Brands Hatch	(United Kingdom) James Baldwin (United Kingdom) Michael O'Brien	(Netherlands) Yelmer Buurman (United Kingdom) Ian Loggie	**(United Kingdom) Rob Collard** **(United Kingdom) Sandy Mitchell**	No Entrants
6	Donington Park	(United Kingdom) No. 2 Jenson Team Rocket RJN	(United Kingdom) No. 72 Barwell Motorsport	**(United Kingdom) No. 69 Ram Racing**	No Entrants
6	Donington Park	(United Kingdom) James Baldwin (United Kingdom) Michael O'Brien	(United Kingdom) Adam Balon (United Kingdom) Phil Keen	**(United Kingdom) Sam De Haan** **(Finland) Patrick Kujala**	No Entrants
7	Snetterton	(United Kingdom) No. 69 Ram Racing	(United Kingdom) No. 6 Ram Racing	**(Bahrain) No. 10 2 Seas Motorsport**	No Entrants
7	Snetterton	(United Kingdom) Sam De Haan (Finland) Patrick Kujala	(Netherlands) Yelmer Buurman (United Kingdom) Ian Loggie	**(United Kingdom) Jack Mitchell** **(United Kingdom) Jordan Witt**	No Entrants
8	Snetterton	(United Kingdom) No. 78 Barwell Motorsport	**(United Kingdom) No. 72 Barwell Motorsport**	(United Kingdom) No. 69 Ram Racing	No Entrants
8	Snetterton	(United Kingdom) Rob Collard (United Kingdom) Sandy Mitchell	**(United Kingdom) Adam Balon** **(United Kingdom) Phil Keen**	(United Kingdom) Sam De Haan (Finland) Patrick Kujala	No Entrants
9	Silverstone	(United Kingdom) No. 78 Barwell Motorsport	(United Kingdom) No. 6 Ram Racing	**(United Kingdom) No. 78 Barwell Motorsport**	(United Kingdom) No. 16 Team Parker Racing
9	Silverstone	(United Kingdom) Rob Collard (United Kingdom) Sandy Mitchell	(Netherlands) Yelmer Buurman (United Kingdom) Ian Loggie	**(United Kingdom) Rob Collard** **(United Kingdom) Sandy Mitchell**	(United Kingdom) Justin Armstrong (United Kingdom) Ryan Ratcliffe

=== GT4 ===
Event	Circuit	Pole position	Pro-Am winners	Silver winners	Am winners
1	Oulton Park	(United Kingdom) No. 95 TF Sport	(United Kingdom) No. 21 Balfe Motorsport	**(United Kingdom) No. 95 TF Sport**	(United Kingdom) No. 33 Team Tegiwa
1	Oulton Park	(Republic of Ireland) Connor O'Brien (United Kingdom) Patrick Kibble	(Sweden) Mia Flewitt (United Kingdom) Euan Hankey	**(Republic of Ireland) Connor O'Brien** **(United Kingdom) Patrick Kibble**	(United Kingdom) Luke Sedzikowski (United Kingdom) David Whitmore
2	Oulton Park	(United Kingdom) No. 21 Balfe Motorsport	**(United Kingdom) No. 21 Balfe Motorsport**	(United Kingdom) No. 97 TF Sport	(United Kingdom) No. 33 Team Tegiwa
2	Oulton Park	(Sweden) Mia Flewitt (United Kingdom) Euan Hankey	**(Sweden) Mia Flewitt** **(United Kingdom) Euan Hankey**	(United Kingdom) Jamie Caroline (United Kingdom) Daniel Vaughan	(United Kingdom) Luke Sedzikowski (United Kingdom) David Whitmore
3	Donington Park	(United Kingdom) No. 95 TF Sport	(United Kingdom) No. 21 Balfe Motorsport	**(United Kingdom) No. 95 TF Sport**	No Entrants
3	Donington Park	(Republic of Ireland) Connor O'Brien (United Kingdom) Patrick Kibble	(Sweden) Mia Flewitt (United Kingdom) Euan Hankey	**(Republic of Ireland) Connor O'Brien** **(United Kingdom) Patrick Kibble**	No Entrants
4	Donington Park	(United Kingdom) No. 58 HHC Motorsport	(United Kingdom) No. 21 Balfe Motorsport	**(United Kingdom) No. 57 HHC Motorsport**	No Entrants
4	Donington Park	(United Kingdom) Jordan Collard (Denmark) Patrik Matthiesen	(Sweden) Mia Flewitt (United Kingdom) Euan Hankey	**(United Kingdom) Gus Bowers** **(United Kingdom) Chris Wesemael**	No Entrants
5	Brands Hatch	(United Kingdom) No. 95 TF Sport	(United Kingdom) No. 21 Balfe Motorsport	**(United Kingdom) No. 61 Academy Motorsport**	No Entrants
5	Brands Hatch	(Republic of Ireland) Connor O'Brien (United Kingdom) Patrick Kibble	(Sweden) Mia Flewitt (United Kingdom) Euan Hankey	**(United Kingdom) Jordan Albert** **(United Kingdom) Matt Cowley**	No Entrants
6	Donington Park	(United Kingdom) No. 61 Academy Motorsport	(United Kingdom) No. 21 Balfe Motorsport	**(United Kingdom) No. 58 HHC Motorsport**	(United Kingdom) No. 33 Team Tegiwa
6	Donington Park	(United Kingdom) Jordan Albert (United Kingdom) Matt Cowley	(Sweden) Mia Flewitt (United Kingdom) Euan Hankey	**(United Kingdom) Jordan Collard** **(Denmark) Patrik Matthiesen**	(United Kingdom) Luke Sedzikowski (United Kingdom) David Whitmore
7	Snetterton	(United Kingdom) No. 58 HHC Motorsport	(United Kingdom) No. 21 Balfe Motorsport	**(United Kingdom) No. 97 TF Sport**	No Entrants
7	Snetterton	(United Kingdom) Jordan Collard (Denmark) Patrik Matthiesen	(Sweden) Mia Flewitt (United Kingdom) Euan Hankey	**(United Kingdom) Jamie Caroline** **(United Kingdom) Daniel Vaughan**	No Entrants
8	Snetterton	(United Kingdom) No. 61 Academy Motorsports	(United Kingdom) No. 21 Balfe Motorsport	**(United Kingdom) No. 58 HHC Motorsport**	No Entrants
8	Snetterton	(United Kingdom) Jordan Albert (United Kingdom) Matt Cowley	(Sweden) Mia Flewitt (United Kingdom) Euan Hankey	**(United Kingdom) Jordan Collard** **(Denmark) Patrik Matthiesen**	No Entrants
9	Silverstone	(United Kingdom) No. 23 Speedworks Motorsport	**(United Kingdom) No. 42 Century Motorsport**	(United Kingdom) No. 97 TF Sport	No Entrants
9	Silverstone	(United Kingdom) James Kell (United Kingdom) Sam Smelt	**(United Kingdom) Andrew Gordon-Colebrook** **(United Kingdom) Rob Wheldon**	(United Kingdom) Jamie Caroline (United Kingdom) Daniel Vaughan	No Entrants

== Championship standings ==
Points were awarded as follows:

Length	1st	2nd	3rd	4th	5th	6th	7th	8th	9th	10th
1 hour	25	18	15	12	10	8	6	4	2	1
2+ hours	37.5	27	22.5	18	15	12	9	6	3	1.5

=== Drivers' championships ===
==== Overall ====
Pos.	Drivers	Team	OUL		DON		BRH	DON	SNE		SIL	Points
GT3
1	(United Kingdom) Rob Collard (United Kingdom) Sandy Mitchell	(United Kingdom) Barwell Motorsport	4	2	5	6	1	6	2	**5**	**1**	168
2	(United Kingdom) Sam De Haan (Finland) Patrick Kujala	(United Kingdom) Ram Racing	5	3	2	8	4	1	**5**	3	8	148.5
3	(United Kingdom) Adam Balon (United Kingdom) Phil Keen	(United Kingdom) Barwell Motorsport	7	**1**	4	2	12	2	7	1	9	134
4	(United Kingdom) James Baldwin (United Kingdom) Michael O'Brien	(United Kingdom) Jenson Team Rocket RJN	1	6	**8**	9	**2**	**3**	8	6	3	125
5	(Netherlands) Yelmer Buurman (United Kingdom) Ian Loggie	(United Kingdom) Ram Racing	6	8	3	11	3	9	4	4	2	111
6	(United Kingdom) Michael Igoe	(United Kingdom) WPI Motorsport	11	9	1	7	5	10	6	2	6	103
7	(United Kingdom) Jack Mitchell (United Kingdom) Jordan Witt	(Bahrain) 2 Seas Motorsport	12	4	7	3	8	4	1	8	12	90.5
8	(Italy) Andrea Caldarelli	(United Kingdom) WPI Motorsport			1	7			6	2	6	84.5
9	(United Kingdom) Lewis Proctor (United Kingdom) Ollie Wilkinson	(United Kingdom) Optimum Motorsport	**2**	5	9	4	10	5	3	7	13	80.5
10	(United Kingdom) Angus Fender (United Kingdom) Dean MacDonald	(Bahrain) 2 Seas Motorsport	3	Ret	Ret	21	11	13	11	9	5	35
11	(United Kingdom) Richard Neary (United Kingdom) Sam Neary	(United Kingdom) Team ABBA Racing	8	Ret	6	20	7	8	DNS	DNS	11	34
12	(United Kingdom) Nick Jones (United Kingdom) Scott Malvern	(United Kingdom) Team Parker Racing	10	Ret	11	1	21	Ret	10	21		27
12	(United Kingdom) Sennan Fielding (United Kingdom) Richard Williams	(United Kingdom) Steller Performance					6	7			10	27
13	(France) Franck Perera	(United Kingdom) WPI Motorsport					5					15
14	(United Kingdom) Stewart Proctor (United Kingdom) Joe Osborne	(United Kingdom) Balfe Motorsport			12	**5**		11	9	10		10
15	(United Kingdom) Marcus Clutton (United Kingdom) John Seale	(United Kingdom) JMH Automotive	13	7								6
16	(United Kingdom) Duncan Cameron (Republic of Ireland) Matt Griffin	(Italy) AF Corse	9	Ret	10	10			12	11		4.5
17	(United Kingdom) Andrew Howard	(United Kingdom) Beechdean AMR					9				Ret	3
17	(United Kingdom) Jonathan Adam	(United Kingdom) Beechdean AMR					9					3
17	(United Kingdom) Jonathan Adam	(United Kingdom) Garage 59 (Note: Jonathan Adam was ineligible to score points with Garage 59 as the team was not a full season entrant.)									Ret	3
18	(Denmark) Dennis Lind	(United Kingdom) WPI Motorsport	11	9								2
19	(Italy) Marco Mapelli	(United Kingdom) WPI Motorsport						10				1.5
	(Republic of Ireland) Charlie Eastwood	(United Kingdom) Beechdean AMR									Ret	0
Drivers ineligible to score points
	(Oman) Al Faisal Al Zubair (Croatia) Martin Kodrić	(Bahrain) 2 Seas Motorsport									4	–
	(United States) Brendan Iribe (United Kingdom) Ollie Millroy	(United Kingdom) Optimum Motorsport									7	–
	(United Kingdom) Michael Brown (United Kingdom) Matt Manderson	(United Kingdom) Ultimate Speed						12			Ret	–
	(United Kingdom) Chris Buncombe (United Kingdom) Jenson Button	(United Kingdom) Jenson Team Rocket RJN									14	–
	(United Kingdom) Mark Crader (United Kingdom) Alex Mortimer	(United Kingdom) Optimum Motorsport									15	–
	(United Kingdom) Justin Armstrong (United Kingdom) Ryan Ratcliffe	(United Kingdom) Team Parker Racing									16	–
	(Belgium) Laurent de Meeus (United Kingdom) Jamie Stanley	(United Kingdom) FF Corse									17	–
	(United Kingdom) John Dhillon (United Kingdom) Phil Quaife	(United Kingdom) Scott Sport									22	–
	(United Kingdom) Lee Frost (United Kingdom) Lucky Khera (United Kingdom) Ross Wylie	(United Kingdom) Simon Green Motorsport									28	–
	(United Kingdom) Tom Canning (Italy) Giacomo Petrobelli	(United Kingdom) TF Sport									30	–
	(United Kingdom) Shaun Balfe (United Kingdom) Rob Bell	(United Kingdom) Balfe Motorsport									Ret	–
	(Sweden) Alexander West	(United Kingdom) Garage 59									Ret	–
	(United Kingdom) Tim Bridgman (Republic of Ireland) Karl Leonard	(United Kingdom) Team Parker Racing									Ret	–
GT4
1	(United Kingdom) Jamie Caroline (United Kingdom) Daniel Vaughan	(United Kingdom) TF Sport	16	11	14	16	18	17	13	13	19	170
2	(United Kingdom) Jordan Collard (Denmark) Patrik Matthiesen	(United Kingdom) HHC Motorsport	15	12	18	**14**	Ret	14	14	13	21	158.5
3	(Republic of Ireland) Connor O'Brien (United Kingdom) Patrick Kibble	(United Kingdom) TF Sport	**14**	Ret	**13**	18	**19**	16	15	14	20	152.5
4	(United Kingdom) Gus Bowers (United Kingdom) Chris Wesemael	(United Kingdom) HHC Motorsport	18	14	17	12	15	21	16	20	23	120.5
5	(United Kingdom) Matt Cowley	(United Kingdom) Academy Motorsport	22	16	16	17	13	**15**	19	17	29	118.5
6	(United Kingdom) Andrew Gordon-Colebrooke	(United Kingdom) Century Motorsport	19	13	20	19	14		20	16	18	108.5
7	(Sweden) Mia Flewitt (United Kingdom) Euan Hankey	(United Kingdom) Balfe Motorsport	20	**10**	19	13	20	18	17	15	Ret	101
8	(United Kingdom) James Kell (United Kingdom) Sam Smelt	(United Kingdom) Speedworks Motorsport	17	Ret	15	15	16	19	18	18	**27**	99.5
9	(United Kingdom) Jordan Albert	(United Kingdom) Academy Motorsport	22	16	16	17	13	**15**				98.5
10	(Canada) Ben Hurst	(United Kingdom) Century Motorsport	19	13	20	19	17	Ret	21	19	25	63
11	(United Kingdom) Rob Wheldon	(United Kingdom) Century Motorsport									18	37.5
12	(United Kingdom) Adam Hatfield	(United Kingdom) Century Motorsport					17	Ret	21	19	25	33
13	(United Kingdom) Ben Green	(United Kingdom) Century Motorsport					14					27
14	(United Kingdom) Will Moore	(United Kingdom) Academy Motorsport							19	17	29	20
15	(United Kingdom) Luke Sedzikowski (United Kingdom) David Whitmore	(United Kingdom) Team Tegiwa	21	15				22				18
16	(United Kingdom) Ben Tuck	(United Kingdom) Century Motorsport							20	16		14
Drivers ineligible to score points
	(United Kingdom) Warren Hughes (Switzerland) Jan Klingelnberg	(United Kingdom) Balfe Motorsport						20			WD	–
	(United Kingdom) James Dorlin (United Kingdom) Alex Toth-Jones	(United Kingdom) MSL powered by Newbridge Motorsport AMR									24	–
	(Germany) Lars Dahmann (United Kingdom) Charlie Hollings	(United Kingdom) Balfe Motorsport									26	–
	(United Kingdom) Nick Jones (United Kingdom) Scott Malvern	(United Kingdom) Team Parker Racing									Ret	–
Pos.	Drivers	Team	OUL		DON		BRH	DON	SNE		SIL	Points

Colour	Result
Gold	Winner
Silver	Second place
Bronze	Third place
Green	Points classification
Blue	Non-points classification
Blue	Non-classified finish (NC)
Purple	Retired, not classified (Ret)
Red	Did not qualify (DNQ)
Red	Did not pre-qualify (DNPQ)
Black	Disqualified (DSQ)
White	Did not start (DNS)
White	Withdrew (WD)
White	Race cancelled (C)
Blank	Did not practice (DNP)
Blank	Did not arrive (DNA)
Blank	Excluded (EX)

**Bold** indicates pole position

==== Pro-Am Cup ====
Pos.	Drivers	Team	OUL		DON		BRH	DON	SNE		SIL	Points
GT3
1	(Netherlands) Yelmer Buurman (United Kingdom) Ian Loggie	(United Kingdom) Ram Racing	**6**	8	3	11	**3**	9	**4**	4	**2**	212.5
2	(United Kingdom) Adam Balon (United Kingdom) Phil Keen	(United Kingdom) Barwell Motorsport	7	**1**	**4**	2	12	**2**	7	**1**	9	198.5
3	(United Kingdom) Michael Igoe	(United Kingdom) WPI Motorsport	11	9	1	7	5	10	6	2	6	177.5
4	(Italy) Andrea Caldarelli	(United Kingdom) WPI Motorsport			1	7			6	2	6	112.5
5	(United Kingdom) Richard Neary (United Kingdom) Sam Neary	(United Kingdom) Team ABBA Racing	8	Ret	4	20	7	8	DNS	DNS	11	106.5
6	(United Kingdom) Nick Jones (United Kingdom) Scott Malvern	(United Kingdom) Team Parker Racing	10	Ret	11	1	21	Ret	10	21		77
7	(United Kingdom) Stewart Proctor (United Kingdom) Joe Osborne	(United Kingdom) Balfe Motorsport			12	**5**		11	9	10		63
8	(United Kingdom) Duncan Cameron (Republic of Ireland) Matt Griffin	(Italy) AF Corse	9	Ret	10	10			12	11		55
9	(France) Franck Perera	(United Kingdom) WPI Motorsport					5					27
10	(United Kingdom) Marcus Clutton (United Kingdom) John Seale	(United Kingdom) JMH Automotive	13	7								24
11	(Denmark) Dennis Lind	(United Kingdom) WPI Motorsport	11	9								20
12	(United Kingdom) Andrew Howard	(United Kingdom) Beechdean AMR					9				Ret	18
12	(United Kingdom) Jonathan Adam	(United Kingdom) Beechdean AMR					9					18
12	(United Kingdom) Jonathan Adam	(United Kingdom) Garage 59									Ret	18
12	(Italy) Marco Mapelli	(United Kingdom) WPI Motorsport						10				18
	(Republic of Ireland) Charlie Eastwood	(United Kingdom) Beechdean AMR									Ret	0
Drivers ineligible to score points
	(United States) Brendan Iribe (United Kingdom) Ollie Millroy	(United Kingdom) Optimum Motorsport									7	–
	(United Kingdom) Michael Brown (United Kingdom) Matt Manderson	(United Kingdom) Ultimate Speed						12			Ret	–
	(United Kingdom) Chris Buncombe (United Kingdom) Jenson Button	(United Kingdom) Jenson Team Rocket RJN									14	–
	(United Kingdom) Mark Crader (United Kingdom) Alex Mortimer	(United Kingdom) Optimum Motorsport									15	–
	(United Kingdom) Justin Armstrong (United Kingdom) Ryan Ratcliffe	(United Kingdom) Team Parker Racing									16	–
	(Belgium) Laurent de Meeus (United Kingdom) Jamie Stanley	(United Kingdom) FF Corse									17	–
	(United Kingdom) John Dhillon (United Kingdom) Phil Quaife	(United Kingdom) Scott Sport									22	–
	(United Kingdom) Lee Frost (United Kingdom) Lucky Khera (United Kingdom) Ross Wylie	(United Kingdom) Simon Green Motorsport									28	–
	(United Kingdom) Tom Canning (Italy) Giacomo Petrobelli	(United Kingdom) TF Sport									30	–
	(United Kingdom) Shaun Balfe (United Kingdom) Robert Bell	(United Kingdom) Balfe Motorsport									Ret	–
	(Sweden) Alexander West	(United Kingdom) Garage 59									Ret	–
	(United Kingdom) Tim Bridgman (Republic of Ireland) Karl Leonard	(United Kingdom) Team Parker Racing									Ret	–
GT4
1	(Sweden) Mia Flewitt (United Kingdom) Euan Hankey	(United Kingdom) Balfe Motorsport	**20**	**10**	**19**	**13**	**20**	**18**	**17**	**15**	Ret	118.75
2	(United Kingdom) Andrew Gordon-Colebrook (United Kingdom) Rob Wheldon	(United Kingdom) Century Motorsport									18	18.75
Drivers ineligible to score points
	(United Kingdom) Warren Hughes (Switzerland) Jan Klingelnberg	(United Kingdom) Balfe Motorsport						20			WD	–
	(United Kingdom) James Dorlin (United Kingdom) Alex Toth-Jones	(United Kingdom) MSL powered by Newbridge Motorsport AMR									24	–
	(Germany) Lars Dahmann (United Kingdom) Charlie Hollings	(United Kingdom) Balfe Motorsport									26	–
	(United Kingdom) Nick Jones (United Kingdom) Scott Malvern	(United Kingdom) Team Parker Racing									**Ret**	–
Pos.	Drivers	Team	OUL		DON		BRH	DON	SNE		SIL	Points

==== Silver Cup ====
Pos.	Drivers	Team	OUL		DON		BRH	DON	SNE		SIL	Points
GT3
1	(United Kingdom) Rob Collard (United Kingdom) Sandy Mitchell	(United Kingdom) Barwell Motorsport	4	**2**	5	**6**	1	6	2	5	**1**	205
2	(United Kingdom) Sam De Haan (Finland) Patrick Kujala	(United Kingdom) Ram Racing	5	3	2	8	4	1	**5**	3	8	192.5
3	(United Kingdom) James Baldwin (United Kingdom) Michael O'Brien	(United Kingdom) Jenson Team Rocket RJN	1	6	**8**	9	**2**	**3**	8	6	3	169
4	(United Kingdom) Jack Mitchell (United Kingdom) Jordan Witt	(Bahrain) 2 Seas Motorsport	12	4	7	3	8	4	1	8	12	155
5	(United Kingdom) Lewis Proctor (United Kingdom) Ollie Wilkinson	(United Kingdom) Optimum Motorsport	**2**	5	9	4	10	5	3	7	13	129
6	(United Kingdom) Angus Fender (United Kingdom) Dean MacDonald	(Bahrain) 2 Seas Motorsport	3	Ret	Ret	21	11	13	11	9	5	79.5
7	(United Kingdom) Sennan Fielding (United Kingdom) Richard Williams	(United Kingdom) Steller Performance					6	7			10	45
Drivers ineligible to score points
	(Oman) Al Faisal Al Zubair (Croatia) Martin Kodrić	(Bahrain) 2 Seas Motorsport									4	–
GT4
1	(United Kingdom) Jamie Caroline (United Kingdom) Daniel Vaughan	(United Kingdom) TF Sport	16	**11**	14	16	18	17	13	13	19	189.5
2	(United Kingdom) Jordan Collard (Denmark) Patrik Matthiesen	(United Kingdom) HHC Motorsport	15	12	18	**14**	Ret	14	14	12	21	169
3	(Republic of Ireland) Connor O'Brien (United Kingdom) Patrick Kibble	(United Kingdom) TF Sport	**14**	Ret	**13**	18	**19**	16	15	14	20	159
4	(United Kingdom) Matt Cowley	(United Kingdom) Academy Motorsport	22	16	16	17	13	**15**	19	17	29	135.5
5	(United Kingdom) Gus Bowers (United Kingdom) Chris Wesemael	(United Kingdom) HHC Motorsport	18	14	17	12	15	21	16	20	23	130.5
6	(United Kingdom) James Kell (United Kingdom) Sam Smelt	(United Kingdom) Speedworks Motorsport	17	Ret	15	15	16	19	18	18	**27**	112.5
7	(United Kingdom) Jordan Albert	(United Kingdom) Academy Motorsport	22	16	16	17	13	**15**				108.5
8	(United Kingdom) Andrew Gordon-Colebrooke	(United Kingdom) Century Motorsport	19	13	20	19	14		20	16		83
9	(Canada) Ben Hurst	(United Kingdom) Century Motorsport	19	13	20	19	17	Ret	21	19	25	78
10	(United Kingdom) Adam Hatfield	(United Kingdom) Century Motorsport					17	Ret	21	19	25	40
11	(United Kingdom) Ben Green	(United Kingdom) Century Motorsport					14					27
11	(United Kingdom) Will Moore	(United Kingdom) Academy Motorsport							19	17	29	27
12	(United Kingdom) Ben Tuck	(United Kingdom) Century Motorsport							20	16		18
Pos.	Drivers	Team	OUL		DON		BRH	DON	SNE		SIL	Points

==== Am Cup ====
Pos.	Drivers	Team	OUL		DON	BRH	DON	SNE	SIL	Points
GT4
1	(United Kingdom) Luke Sedzikowski (United Kingdom) David Whitmore	(United Kingdom) Team Tegiwa	**21**	**15**			**22**			43.75
Pos.	Drivers	Team	OUL		DON	BRH	DON	SNE	SIL	Points

=== Teams' championship ===
Pos.	Team	Manufacturer	No.	OUL		DON		BRH	DON	SNE		SIL	Points
GT3
1	(United Kingdom) Barwell Motorsport	Lamborghini	72	7	**1**	4	2	12	2	7	1	9	302
1	(United Kingdom) Barwell Motorsport	Lamborghini	78	4	2	5	6	1	6	2	**5**	**1**	302
2	(United Kingdom) Ram Racing	Mercedes-AMG	6	6	8	3	11	3	9	4	4	2	259.5
2	(United Kingdom) Ram Racing	Mercedes-AMG	69	5	3	2	8	4	1	**5**	3	8	259.5
3	(Bahrain) 2 Seas Motorsport^{3}	McLaren	9	3	Ret	Ret	21	11	13	11	9	5	125.5
3	(Bahrain) 2 Seas Motorsport^{3}	McLaren	10	12	4	7	3	8	4	1	8	12	125.5
3	(Bahrain) 2 Seas Motorsport^{3}	McLaren	11									4	125.5
4	(United Kingdom) Jenson Team Rocket RJN^{4}	McLaren	2	1	6	**8**	9	**2**	**3**	8	6	3	125
4	(United Kingdom) Jenson Team Rocket RJN^{4}	McLaren	3									14	125
5	(United Kingdom) WPI Motorsport	Lamborghini	18	11	9	1	7	5	10	6	2	6	103
6	(United Kingdom) Optimum Motorsport^{5}	McLaren	68									15	80.5
6	(United Kingdom) Optimum Motorsport^{5}	McLaren	77									7	80.5
6	(United Kingdom) Optimum Motorsport^{5}	McLaren	96	**2**	5	9	4	10	5	3	7	13	80.5
7	(United Kingdom) Team ABBA Racing	Mercedes-AMG	8	8	Ret	6	20	7	8	DNS	DNS	11	34
8	(United Kingdom) Team Parker Racing^{6}	Porsche	16									16	27
8	(United Kingdom) Team Parker Racing^{6}	Porsche	17									Ret	27
8	(United Kingdom) Team Parker Racing^{6}	Bentley	66	10	Ret	11	1	21	Ret	10	21		27
8	(United Kingdom) Steller Performance	Audi	30					6	7			10	27
9	(United Kingdom) Balfe Motorsport^{2}	McLaren	19									Ret	10
9	(United Kingdom) Balfe Motorsport^{2}	McLaren	36			12	**5**		11	9	10		10
10	(United Kingdom) JMH Automotive	Lamborghini	55	13	7								6
11	(Italy) AF Corse	Ferrari	51	9	Ret	10	10			12	11		4.5
12	(United Kingdom) Beechdean AMR	Aston Martin	7					9				Ret	3
Teams ineligible to score points
	(United Kingdom) Ultimate Speed	Aston Martin	26						12			Ret	–
	(United Kingdom) FF Corse	Ferrari	15									17	–
	(United Kingdom) Scott Sport	Ferrari	13									22	–
	(United Kingdom) Simon Green Motorsport	Ferrari	24									28	–
	(United Kingdom) TF Sport	Aston Martin	38									30	–
	(United Kingdom) Garage 59	Aston Martin	1									Ret	–
GT4
1	(United Kingdom) TF Sport	Aston Martin	95	**14**	Ret	**13**	18	**19**	16	15	14	20	322.5
1	(United Kingdom) TF Sport	Aston Martin	97	16	11	14	16	18	17	13	13	19	322.5
2	(United Kingdom) HHC Motorsport	McLaren	57	18	14	17	12	15	21	16	20	23	279
2	(United Kingdom) HHC Motorsport	McLaren	58	15	12	18	**14**	Ret	14	14	13	21	279
3	(United Kingdom) Century Motorsport^{1} (United Kingdom) Team Tegiwa^{1}	BMW	33	21	15				22				159.5
3	(United Kingdom) Century Motorsport^{1} (United Kingdom) Team Tegiwa^{1}	BMW	42					14		20	16	18	159.5
3	(United Kingdom) Century Motorsport^{1} (United Kingdom) Team Tegiwa^{1}	BMW	43	19	13	20	19	17	Ret	21	19	25	159.5
4	(United Kingdom) Academy Motorsport	Ford	61	22	16	16	17	13	15	19	17	29	118.5
5	(United Kingdom) Balfe Motorsport^{2}	McLaren	20									26	101
5	(United Kingdom) Balfe Motorsport^{2}	McLaren	21	20	**10**	19	13	20	18	17	15	Ret	101
5	(United Kingdom) Balfe Motorsport^{2}	McLaren	22						20			WD	101
6	(United Kingdom) Speedworks Motorsport	Toyota	23	17	Ret	15	15	16	19	18	18	**27**	99.5
Teams ineligible to score points
	(United Kingdom) MSL powered by Newbridge Motorsport AMR	Aston Martin	98									24	–
	(United Kingdom) Team Parker Racing	Mercedes-AMG	66									Ret	–
Pos.	Team	Manufacturer	No.	OUL		DON		BRH	DON	SNE		SIL	Points

^{1} — Car No. 33 entered as Team Tegiwa and Car Nos. 42 and 43 entered as Century Motorsport.
^{2} — The No. 19, No. 20 & No. 22 Balfe Motorsport cars were ineligible to score points as they weren't full season entries.
^{3} — The No. 11 2 Seas Motorsport car was ineligible to score points as it is not a full season entrant.
^{4} — The No. 3 Jenson Team Rocket RJN car was ineligible to score points as it is not a full season entrant.
^{5} — The No. 68 & No. 77 Optimum Motorsport cars were ineligible to score points as they weren't full season entries.
^{6} — The No. 16 & No. 17 Team Parker Racing cars were ineligible to score points as they weren't full season entries.
