= 2013 Mini Challenge UK =

Motor racing competition

Seasons
- ← 2012 2014 →

The 2013 Mini Challenge season was the twelfth season of the Mini Challenge UK. The season started on 6 April at Snetterton Motor Racing Circuit and ended on 29 September at Donington Park. The season featured six rounds of the seven meetings in the United Kingdom, and one in the Netherlands.

== Calendar ==
=== Race calendar ===
Every meeting ran both the JCW and Cooper classes.

Round		Circuit	Date
1	R1	Snetterton Motor Racing Circuit	6–7 April
1	R2	Snetterton Motor Racing Circuit	6–7 April
1	R3	Snetterton Motor Racing Circuit	6–7 April
1	R4	Snetterton Motor Racing Circuit	6–7 April
2	R5	Brands Hatch GP	11–12 May
2	R6	Brands Hatch GP	11–12 May
2	R7	Brands Hatch GP	11–12 May
3	R8	Brands Hatch Indy	22–23 June
3	R9	Brands Hatch Indy	22–23 June
3	R10	Brands Hatch Indy	22–23 June
4	R11	Oulton Park	13 July
4	R12	Oulton Park	13 July
5	R13	Castle Combe	3 August
5	R14	Castle Combe	3 August
6	R15	Zandvoort	7–8 September
6	R16	Zandvoort	7–8 September
6	R17	Zandvoort	7–8 September
7	R18	Donington Park	28–29 September
7	R19	Donington Park	28–29 September
7	R20	Donington Park	28–29 September

== Entry list ==
Team	No.	Driver	Rounds
JCW Class
Sussex Road & Race	1	(United Kingdom) Lee Allen	All
Sussex Road & Race	7	(United Kingdom) Craig Freeman	2–4
Sussex Road & Race	26	(United Kingdom) George Allen	2–3
Sussex Road & Race	29	(United Kingdom) Chris Panayiotou	1
Sussex Road & Race	31	(United Kingdom) Keith Issatt	5, 7
Excelr8 Motorsport	2	(United Kingdom) Luke Caudle	All
Excelr8 Motorsport	10	(United Kingdom) Chris Smith	All
Excelr8 Motorsport	27	(United Kingdom) Rob Smith	7
Excelr8 Motorsport	69	(United Kingdom) Mark Steward	All
Excelr8 Motorsport	79	(United Kingdom) Jono Brown	All
Privateer	4	(United Kingdom) Andy Wilmot	3
Privateer	13	(United Kingdom) Jake Packun	All
Privateer	17	(United Kingdom) William Davison	1, 3–5
Coastal Racing	12	(United Kingdom) Lee Pattison	4
Coastal Racing	14	(United Kingdom) Lee Pattison	1
Advent Motorsport	15	(United Kingdom) Patrick Mortimer	1–5
Lohen	18	(United Kingdom) Chris Callister-Russell	2, 5, 7
Lohen	28	(United Kingdom) Henry Duprey	7
Lohen	45	(United Kingdom) David Ogden	4
Lawrence Davey Racing	19	(United Kingdom) Lawrence Davey	All
IN:MINI	22	(United Kingdom) Chris Smiley	All
IN:MINI	37	(United Kingdom) Stewart Calder	All
Jack Doyle Racing	70	(United Kingdom) Bob Hosier	1–5, 7
Staffs Racing	99	(United Kingdom) Kevin O'Connor	All
Cooper Class
Excelr8 Motorsport	3	(United Kingdom) Gideon Cresswell	1–5, 7
Excelr8 Motorsport	8	(United Kingdom) Hamish Brandon	All
Excelr8 Motorsport	11	(United Kingdom) Grace Williams	All
Excelr8 Motorsport	33	(United Kingdom) Ricky Page	All
Excelr8 Motorsport	73	(United Kingdom) Toby Hotston	5
Lohen	4	(United Kingdom) Graham Leggett	5
Lohen	48	(United Kingdom) Andrew Bray	7
Lohen	77	(United Kingdom) Josh Gollin	All
Advent Motorsport	5	(United Kingdom) Adrian Norman	All
Advent Motorsport	9	(United Kingdom) Simon Walton	3–7
Advent Motorsport	21	(United Kingdom) Trevor Bates	1, 3
Advent Motorsport	25	(United Kingdom) Kevin Norman	1–2, 5
Advent Motorsport	35	(United Kingdom) Justin Taylor	1–5
Advent Motorsport	39	(United Kingdom) Ollie Walker	1–5
Coastal Racing	39	(United Kingdom) Ollie Walker	6–7
Coastal Racing	88	(United Kingdom) Chris Stoney	7
Coastal Racing	89	(United Kingdom) Shane Stoney	All
Lawrence Davey Racing	91	(United Kingdom) Pete Diamant	7
Staffs Racing	94	(United Kingdom) Ben Gridley	3–4
Staffs Racing	94	(United Kingdom) Max Leaver	7

== Championship standings ==
Scoring system

Championship points were awarded for the first 15 positions in each Championship Race. Entries were required to complete 75% of the winning car's race distance in order to be classified and earn points. There were bonus points awarded for Pole Position and Fastest Lap.

Championship Race points

Position	1st	2nd	3rd	4th	5th	6th	7th	8th	9th	10th	11th	12th	13th	14th	15th
Points	20	17	15	13	11	10	9	8	7	6	5	4	3	2	1

=== Drivers' Championship ===
==== JCW Class ====
Pos	Driver	SNE				BHGP			BHI			OUL		CAS		ZAN			DON			Pts
1	Chris Smiley	2	Ret	3	1	6	Ret	4	3	2	1	1	Ret	1	2	1	1	1	1	1	Ret	299
2	Chris Smith	3	3	1	3	2	2	3	5	3	Ret	2	4	4	1	7	7	Ret	2	2	2	276
3	Jake Packun	1	1	Ret	DNS	1	1	1	2	13	Ret	3	1	2	4	2	4	2	4	3	5	275
4	Lee Allen	4	4	4	6	4	Ret	12	1	1	3	4	5	11	7	5	5	3	3	4	Ret	226
5	Luke Caudle	5	2	2	2	3	3	13	Ret	7	6	6	2	5	3	3	2	5	5	Ret	DNS	223
6	Jono Brown	7	7	7	9	9	Ret	9	Ret	5	2	5	3	3	5	4	6	Ret	Ret	7	1	180
7	Lawrence Davey	8	6	5	4	Ret	Ret	5	4	4	4	Ret	DNS	6	6	6	3	4	Ret	5	4	174
8	Mark Steward	10	9	10	10	12	5	6	9	Ret	10	Ret	8	10	10	8	8	6	7	9	7	134
9	Kevin O'Connor	11	10	9	7	5	Ret	10	7	10	11	7	6	7	8	10	10	Ret	10	10	DNS	118
10	Stewart Calder	14	12	12	13	11	7	11	Ret	9	Ret	9	7	9	11	9	9	7	6	8	6	118
11	William Davison	6	5	6	6				6	6	5	8	Ret	8	9							96
12	Bob Hosier	12	11	13	12	Ret	8	8	12	15	12	11	Ret	13	13				11	13	9	67
13	George Allen					8	6	7	10	12	9											44
14	Patrick Mortimer	13	13	11	11	10	Ret	Ret	11	14	13	10	10									44
15	Chris Callister-Russell					7	4	2						DNS	DNS				Ret	12	Ret	43
16	Rob Smith																		8	6	3	33
17	Andy Wilmot								8	8	7											25
18	Craig Freeman					Ret	Ret	DNS	13	11	8	Ret	11									21
19	Henry Duprey																		9	11	8	20
20	Chris Panayiotou	15	8	8	DNS																	17
21	Lee Pattison	9	Ret	Ret	8							Ret	DNS									16
22	Keith Issatt													12	12				Ret	DNS	Ret	8
23	David Ogden											Ret	9									7

==== Cooper Class ====
Pos	Driver	SNE				BHGP			BHI			OUL		CAS		ZAN			DON			Pts
1	Shane Stoney	1	1	1	1	4	1	1	Ret	2	6	1	1	1	1	1	3	1	1	DNS	DNS	328
2	Hamish Brandon	4	3	3	4	6	5	5	1	3	2	2	2	2	4	2	2	2	4	2	4	303
3	Josh Gollin	2	2	2	2	2	2	3	2	11	5	4	5	DNS	7	3	1	3	3	1	2	286
4	Ollie Walker	3	Ret	6	3	1	6	2	3	1	3	3	3	4	2	5	6	Ret	Ret	3	1	256
5	Ricky Page	6	4	4	Ret	5	3	6	Ret	7	7	5	4	3	3	4	4	6	2	6	3	225
6	Adrian Norman	8	6	7	7	7	8	7	6	4	8	8	7	5	5	6	5	Ret	7	7	6	181
7	Gideon Cresswell	5	DNS	5	5	3	4	4	4	DSQ	1	6	8	Ret	6				8	9	5	162
8	Grace Williams	9	7	8	9	8	9	8	10	9	10	10	9	Ret	9	7	7	4	5	5	8	153
9	Justin Taylor	7	5	Ret	6	Ret	7	9	5	6	9	7	6	Ret	8							101
10	Simon Walton								8	8	11	9	10	6	10	8	8	5	10	10	7	100
11	Kevin Norman	11	9	10	10	9	10	10						8	13							54
12	Trevor Bates	10	8	9	9				9	10	12											45
13	Ben Gridley								7	5	4	Ret	DNS									33
14	Chris Stoney																		6	4	Ret	23
15	Andrew Bray																		12	11	9	16
16	Max Leaver																		9	8	Ret	15
17	Pete Diamant																		11	12	10	15
18	Graham Leggett													7	11							14
19	Toby Hotston													9	12							11
