= 2014 Mini Challenge UK =

Motor racing competition

Seasons
- ← 2013 2015 →

The 2014 Mini Challenge season was the thirteenth season of the Mini Challenge UK. The season started on 26 April at Donington Park and ended on 14 September at Brands Hatch. The season featured seven rounds across the UK.

== Calendar ==
=== Race calendar ===
All meetings held both the JCW and Cooper class.

Round		Circuit	Date
1	R1	Donington Park	26–27 April
1	R2	Donington Park	26–27 April
1	R3	Donington Park	26–27 April
2	R4	Brands Hatch	10–11 May
2	R5	Brands Hatch	10–11 May
2	R6	Brands Hatch	10–11 May
2	R7	Brands Hatch	10–11 May
3	R8	Snetterton Motor Racing Circuit	21–22 June
3	R9	Snetterton Motor Racing Circuit	21–22 June
4	R10	Oulton Park	12 July
4	R11	Oulton Park	12 July
4	R12	Oulton Park	12 July
5	R13	Castle Combe	2 August
5	R14	Castle Combe	2 August
6	R15	Silverstone Circuit	16–17 August
6	R16	Silverstone Circuit	16–17 August
6	R17	Silverstone Circuit	16–17 August
7	R18	Brands Hatch	13–14 September
7	R19	Brands Hatch	13–14 September
7	R20	Brands Hatch	13–14 September

== Entry list ==
Team	No.	Driver	Rounds
JCW Class
Peak Performance Racing	2	(United Kingdom) Luke Caudle	All
Sussex Road & Race	7	(United Kingdom) Craig Freeman	5–6
Sussex Road & Race	32	(United Kingdom) Alan Taylor	All
Sussex Road & Race	57	(United Kingdom) Keith Issatt	1, 3–7
Excelr8 Motorsport	8	(United Kingdom) Hamish Brandon	All
Excelr8 Motorsport	37	(United Kingdom) Rob Smith	4, 6–7
Excelr8 Motorsport	69	(United Kingdom) Mark Steward	1, 3, 6–7
Excelr8 Motorsport	79	(United Kingdom) Jono Brown	7
Excelr8 Motorsport	100	(United Kingdom) Chris Smith	2
Excelr8 Motorsport	778	(United Kingdom) Chris James	4
Excelr8 Motorsport	888	(United Kingdom) Chris Knox	All
Team Swanflight	15	(United Kingdom) Patrick Mortimer	2–7
Lohen	18	(United Kingdom) Chris Callister-Russell	1–6
Lohen	28	(United Kingdom) Henry Duprey	All
Lohen	88	(United Kingdom) Mike Fryatt	6
Lawrence Davey Racing	19	(United Kingdom) Lawrence Davey	All
Lawrence Davey Racing	41	(United Kingdom) Paul Knapp	7
Coastal Racing	20	(United Kingdom) Kyle Reid	4
Privateer	33	(United Kingdom) James Webb	3
IN:MINI	55	(United Kingdom) Simon Quinn	1–2
Oakfield Motorsport	66	(United Kingdom) Steve Ruxton-Cocker	1–2
Oakfield Motorsport	77	(United Kingdom) Neil Newstead	All
Charles Stewart GP	110	(United Kingdom) Charles Stewart	All
Cooper Class
Coastal Racing	1	(United Kingdom) Shane Stoney	All
Coastal Racing	25	(United Kingdom) William Davison	6
Coastal Racing	49	(United Kingdom) Martin Poole	All
Coastal Racing	89	(United Kingdom) Chris Stoney	1–3, 5
Sussex Road & Race	3	(United Kingdom) Ricky Page	All
Excelr8 Motorsport	4	(United Kingdom) Gideon Cresswell	All
Excelr8 Motorsport	17	(United Kingdom) William Phillips	All
Excelr8 Motorsport	73	(United Kingdom) Toby Hotston	1–2
Excelr8 Motorsport	78	(United Kingdom) Matt Hammond	All
Team Swanflight	9	(United Kingdom) Simon Walton	All
Team Swanflight	10	(United Kingdom) Adrian Norman	All
Peak Performance Racing	11	(United Kingdom) Grace Williams	All
Lohen	13	(United Kingdom) Stuart Kent	6
Lohen	128	(United Kingdom) Will Dendy	7
Mark Wakefield Racing	16	(United Kingdom) Mark Wakefield	1–2, 4–7
Staffs Racing	23	(United Kingdom) Max Leaver	5–7
West Anglia College	27	(United Kingdom) Josh Gollin	All
Lawrence Davey Racing	76	(United Kingdom) Jo Polley	1–2, 4–7
Team Aim Higher	91	(United Kingdom) Pete Diament	All

== Championship standings ==
Scoring system

Championship points were awarded for the first 15 positions in each Championship Race. Entries were required to complete 75% of the winning car's race distance in order to be classified and earn points. There were bonus points awarded for Pole Position and Fastest Lap.

Championship Race points

Position	1st	2nd	3rd	4th	5th	6th	7th	8th	9th	10th	11th	12th	13th	14th	15th
Points	20	17	15	13	11	10	9	8	7	6	5	4	3	2	1

=== Drivers' Championship ===
==== JCW Class ====
Pos	Driver	DON			BHI				SNE		OUL			CAS		SIL			BHGP			Pts
1	(United Kingdom) Chris Knox	10	5	1	4	1	1	1	2	6	1	1	3	1	1	1	1	10	2	1	C	325
2	(United Kingdom) Neil Newstead	3	3	5	5	4	4	7	3	3	3	5	1	4	Ret	4	5	8	3	3	C	239
3	(United Kingdom) Luke Caudle	1	1	2	1	2	Ret	4	1	1	Ret	Ret	Ret	2	3	11	2	Ret	Ret	4	C	220
4	(United Kingdom) Lawrence Davey	2	2	4	3	6	2	13	4	5	4	4	2	3	Ret	7	9	2	Ret	Ret	C	210
5	(United Kingdom) Hamish Brandon	4	6	3	8	5	8	6	8	4	5	6	4	5	4	5	6	4	8	6	C	208
6	(United Kingdom) Henry Duprey	7	8	10	10	10	6	5	7	2	9	10	10	6	2	2	3	Ret	4	2	C	190
7	(United Kingdom) Chris Callister-Russell	Ret	9	Ret	DSQ	7	5	2	DNS	DNS	2	2	Ret	Ret	DNS	3	4	5			C	120
8	(United Kingdom) Alan Taylor	9	Ret	9	9	8	Ret	8	Ret	DNS	8	7	8	10	5	6	10	7	7	12	C	117
9	(United Kingdom) Patrick Mortimer				7	9	7	10	9	9	10	8	9	8	7	10	Ret	DNS	8	11	C	102
10	(United Kingdom) Mark Steward	5	7	6					10	7						9	8	3	10	8	C	89
11	(United Kingdom) Rob Smith										6	9	5			Ret	7	1	5	5	C	79
12	(United Kingdom) Charles Stewart	11	DNS	7	11	12	DSQ	9	5	Ret	DNS	Ret	7	9	Ret	14	11	6	Ret	Ret	C	74
13	(United Kingdom) Keith Issatt	Ret	Ret	8					6	8	Ret	DNS	DNS	7	6	8	12	Ret	9	9	C	71
14	(United Kingdom) Chris Smith				2	3	3	3													C	63
15	(United Kingdom) Simon Quinn	6	4	11	6	DNS	Ret	DNS													C	39
16	(United Kingdom) Chris James										7	3	6								C	34
17	(United Kingdom) Jono Brown																		1	7	C	31
18	(United Kingdom) Steve Ruxton-Cocker	8	10	Ret	Ret	11	9	11													C	31
19	(United Kingdom) Mike Fryatt															12	13	9			C	14
20	(United Kingdom) James Webb								11	10											C	11
21	(United Kingdom) Paul Knapp																		Ret	10	C	6
22	(United Kingdom) Craig Freeman													DNS	DNS	13	Ret	DNS			C	3
23	(United Kingdom) Kyle Reid										DNS	DNS	DNS								C	0

==== Cooper Class ====
Pos	Driver	DON			BHI				SNE		OUL			CAS		SIL			BHGP			Pts
1	(United Kingdom) Shane Stoney	1	1	1	1	3	1	6	1	1	1	1	1	1	1	3	5	7	4	4	C	337
2	(United Kingdom) Josh Gollin	2	6	3	4	6	4	3	3	5	2	2	2	2	Ret	4	2	1	3	1	C	272
3	(United Kingdom) William Phillips	9	4	9	9	DSQ	3	1	2	2	Ret	3	3	3	6	1	4	3	2	2	C	247
4	(United Kingdom) Ricky Page	DNS	2	7	2	4	2	2	6	3	Ret	4	8	4	2	2	1	4	1	3	C	225
5	(United Kingdom) Matt Hammond	Ret	3	5	3	2	6	4	4	6	7	5	4	5	4	7	6	2	9	10	C	210
6	(United Kingdom) Gideon Cresswell	3	5	2	5	1	5	Ret	5	DSQ	5	8	Ret	6	3	5	3	5	8	12	C	193
7	(United Kingdom) Simon Walton	4	7	6	6	10	7	7	Ret	7	4	7	Ret	11	5	12	9	12	5	7	C	148
8	(United Kingdom) Mark Wakefield	8	8	10	Ret	9	9	5			6	6	7	7	11	9	Ret	9	7	6	C	123
9	(United Kingdom) Grace Williams	6	9	4	12	8	8	9	Ret	9	Ret	9	5	10	7	11	13	14	10	8	C	121
10	(United Kingdom) Adrian Norman	5	Ret	11	7	5	Ret	10	8	8	Ret	10	9	13	9	8	11	11	11	11	C	109
11	(United Kingdom) Martin Poole	Ret	Ret	13	10	7	Ret	8	9	Ret	3	Ret	6	DNS	DNS	10	10	10	Ret	13	C	79
12	(United Kingdom) Pete Diament	10	10	12	Ret	11	Ret	11	Ret	10	8	11	10	14	12	12	12	13	13	15	C	71
13	(United Kingdom) Jo Polley	11	11	14	11	Ret	10	12			9	12	11	9	10	14	14	16	12	14	C	66
14	(United Kingdom) Chris Stoney	7	Ret	8	8	Ret	DNS	DNS	7	4				8	Ret						C	55
15	(United Kingdom) Max Leaver													12	8	Ret	8	6	Ret	9	C	37
16	(United Kingdom) William Davison															6	7	8			C	27
17	(United Kingdom) Toby Hotston	12	12	15	13	12	11	13													C	24
18	(United Kingdom) Will Dendy																		6	5	C	21
19	(United Kingdom) Stuart Kent															15	15	15			C	3
