= Chris Smiley =

British racing driver (born 1992)

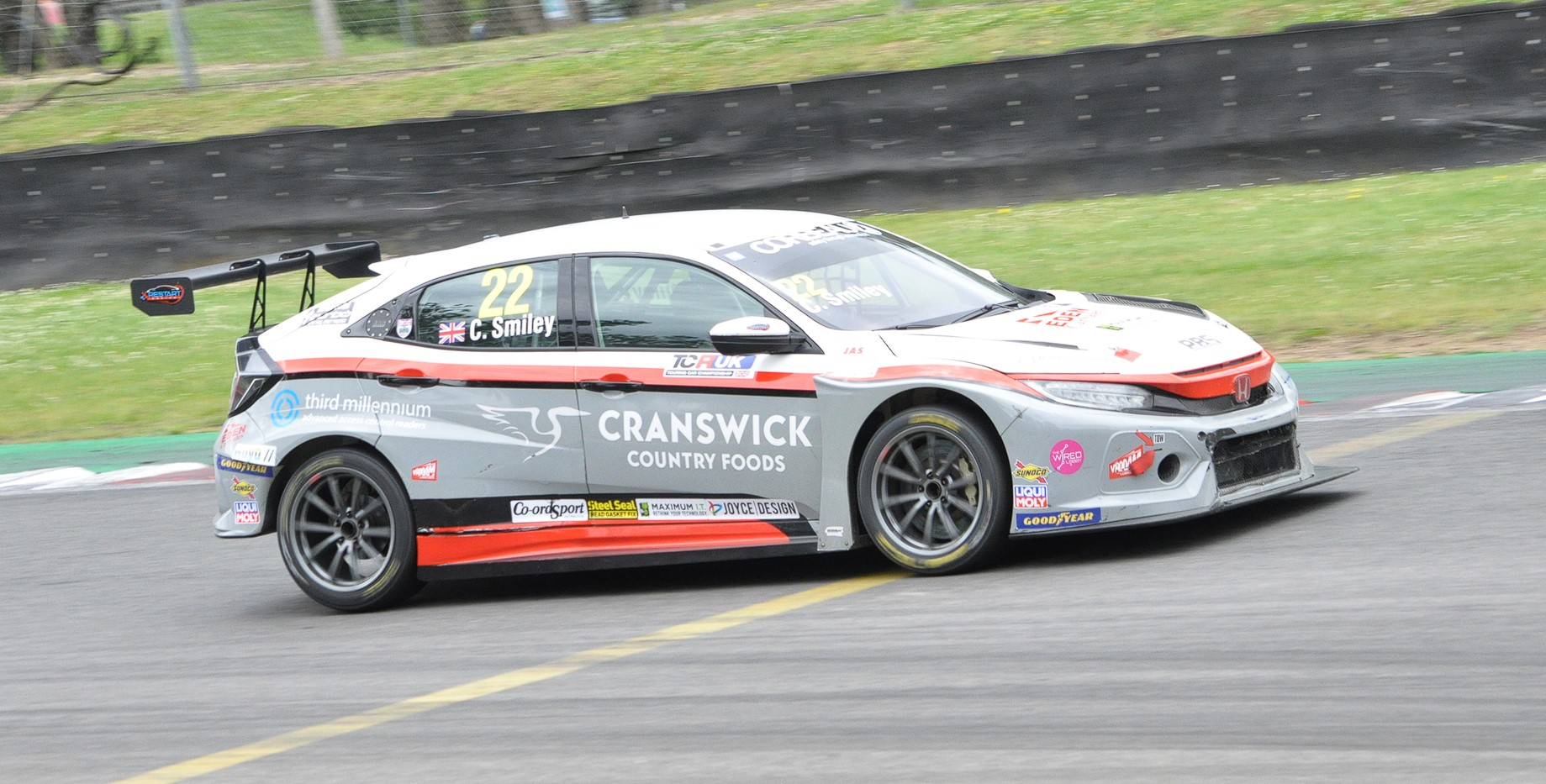
- Nationality: (United Kingdom) British
- Born: Christopher Smiley; 6 April 1992 (age 34) Carrickfergus, Northern Ireland, UK

British Touring Car Championship career
- Debut season: 2016
- Current team: Restart Racing
- Years active: 2016–2021, 2024–2026
- Car number: 22
- Former teams: Tony Gilham Racing, BTC Racing, Excelr8 Motorsport
- Starts: 252
- Wins: 1
- Poles: 0
- Fastest laps: 2
- Best finish: 13th in 2018

Previous series
- 2022 2014 2014 2013 2007-08 2007: TCR UK Touring Car Championship; Volkswagen Scirocco R-Cup; Volkswagen Racing Cup; Mini Challenge UK; Karting; Ginetta Junior Championship

Championship titles
- 2022 2013: TCR UK Touring Car Championship; Mini Challenge UK

Christopher Smiley (born 6 April 1992) is a British racing driver from Northern Ireland currently competing in the British Touring Car Championship for Restart Racing. He is the 2022 TCR UK champion.

== Racing career ==
=== Early career ===
Smiley began his career in karting in 2000, when he finished third overall in the BRDC Stars Of Tomorrow in 2006, he also raced in the Ginetta Junior Championship after winning the junior scholarship in 2007. He went on to win the 2013 Mini Challenge GB title, scoring nine wins and 14 podiums in 20 races. He made a one-off appearance in the 2014 Volkswagen Racing Cup winning both races at Oulton Park Circuit, as well as finishing fourth in the Volkswagen Scirocco R-Cup in 2014.

=== British Touring Car Championship ===
In January 2016, it was announced that Smiley would make his British Touring Car Championship debut with TLC Racing driving a Toyota Avensis. However, he was forced to leave the championship at the mid-way point due to funding issues. He would end up 32nd in the standings with a best result of 16th at Thruxton. For the second half of the 2016 season, he joined the Renault UK Clio Cup and achieved a best result of fifth at Rockingham and finished the season in 17th position scoring 92 points.

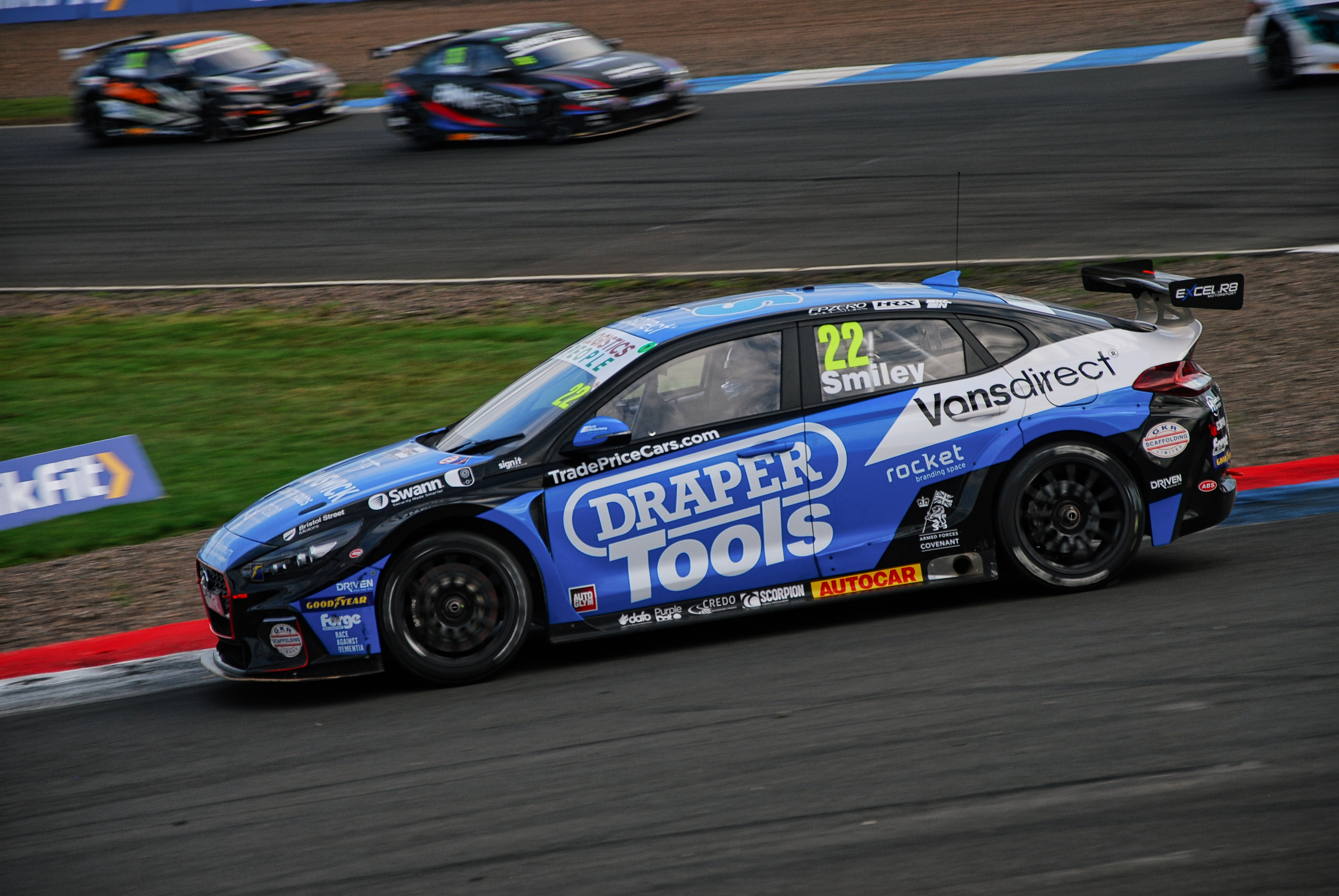
Smiley racing at Knockhill during the 2021 British Touring Car Championship.

Smiley returned to the BTCC in 2017 with BTC Norlin Racing where he would stay for the next three seasons. The relationship proved fruitful with Smiley scoring a debut win at Rockingham in 2018 alongside a further four podiums. His best season was 2018 where he finished 13th and scored 132 points.

For 2020, Smiley joined Excelr8 Motorsport and the brand new Hyundai i30 Fastback project. In the season opener at Donington Park Smiley secured a first ever podium for Hyundai in the championship on the cars debut. He finished the season in 14th with 106 points. He was retained by the team for 2021 but endured a tougher season, finishing 15th with a best result of fourth.

=== TCR UK Touring Car Championship ===
Having been left without a BTCC drive, Smiley joined the 2022 TCR UK Touring Car Championship grid driving a Honda Civic Type R TCR (FK8). He re-joined his former BTC Racing team boss, Bert Taylor, at the newly formed Restart Racing. In the opening race at Oulton Park, Smiley completed a grand chelem by taking pole position, fastest lap and leading every lap on his way to victory. In the reverse grid second race of the day, he managed to fight his way up to fifth and left the opening round second in the championship behind Max Hart.

In the second event, Smiley once again qualified on pole but contact with Adam Shepherd in the Hyundai sent him tumbling down the order. He recovered to 14th after a pit-stop. In the reverse grid race he fought his way through to second but fell 44 points behind after Max Hart's double victory.

Round 3 took place at Brands Hatch and was a triple header. The weekend started well for Smiley with a second place in the opening encounter, but a mechanical failure in the reverse grid race and an eighth place finish in the third race dropped him to fourth in the championship behind Isaac Smith and reigning double champion Lewis Kent.

The championship returned to Oulton Park for Round 4, but Smiley was unable to reproduce his race winning form the opening event taking two fourth places which lifted him back up to 3rd in the championship.

Round 5 took place at Castle Combe, and Smiley returned to form by taking pole position. However, a clutch issue at the start of the opener led to him stalling on the grid when the lights went out. He managed to battle his way back through the pack to fifth position and secured an additional point for fastest lap. In the second race, Smiley was forced to start from the pit-lane due to the same clutch issue that hindered him in the first race. Again, he picked his way back through the field to finish fourth and took fastest lap. Due to issues for Lewis Kent and Max Hart, Smiley was able to pull himself back up to second in the championship behind Isaac Smith.

The penultimate event saw the championship return to Donington Park with Smiley qualifying second for the opening encounter but he fell back to third by the end of the race. However in the second race contact between Jamie Tonks and Adam Shepherd caused Shepherd's Hyundai to hit Smiley's Honda breaking the right rear suspension and forcing him out of the race. Due to the championship's drop score system however, Smiley found himself leading the championship, albeit equal on points with Smith.

The season finale took place at Snetterton after an almost two month break. In wet conditions, Smiley took pole by just over a second and took his second victory of the season in the first race. However, with Smith finishing behind him, and also taking the point for fastest lap, Smiley could only extend his advantage to eight points. In the final race of the season, Smiley and Smith battled on track with Smith eventually succumbing to the pressure, running wide, and handing the championship to Smiley with a margin of 21 points.

== Racing record ==
=== Complete British Touring Car Championship results ===
(key) (Races in bold indicate pole position – 1 point awarded just in first race; races in italics indicate fastest lap – 1 point awarded all races; * signifies that driver led race for at least one lap – 1 point given all races; ^{Superscript} number indicates points-scoring qualifying race position)

Year	Team	Car	1	2	3	4	5	6	7	8	9	10	11	12	13	14	15	16	17	18	19	20	21	22	23	24	25	26	27	28	29	30	DC	Points
2016	TLC Racing	Toyota Avensis	BRH; 1; 24	BRH; 2; 28	BRH; 3 Ret	DON; 1; 22	DON; 2; 21	DON; 3; 17	THR; 1; 18	THR; 2; 22	THR; 3; 16	OUL; 1; 28	OUL; 2; 22	OUL; 3; 21	CRO; 1; 24	CRO; 2; 24	CRO; 3; 23	SNE; 1	SNE; 2	SNE; 3	KNO; 1	KNO; 2	KNO; 3	ROC; 1	ROC; 2	ROC; 3	SIL; 1	SIL; 2	SIL; 3	BRH; 1	BRH; 2	BRH; 3	32nd	0
2017	BTC Norlin Racing	Chevrolet Cruze	BRH; 1; 21	BRH; 2 Ret	BRH; 3; 25	DON; 1 Ret	DON; 2; 17	DON; 3; 17	THR; 1; 19	THR; 2; 15	THR; 3; 18	OUL; 1 NC	OUL; 2; 27	OUL; 3; 20	CRO; 1; 20	CRO; 2; 20	CRO; 3; 13	SNE; 1; 14	SNE; 2; 17	SNE; 3; 20	KNO; 1; 19	KNO; 2; 14	KNO; 3; 26	ROC; 1; 20	ROC; 2; 10	ROC; 3; 9	SIL; 1; 18	SIL; 2; 11	SIL; 3; 7	BRH; 1; 11	BRH; 2 Ret	BRH; 3; 11	21st	45
2018	BTC Norlin Racing	Honda Civic Type R (FK2)	BRH; 1; 10	BRH; 2; 17	BRH; 3; 16	DON; 1; 7	DON; 2; 2*	DON; 3 NC	THR; 1; 10	THR; 2; 10	THR; 3; 9	OUL; 1; 12	OUL; 2; 18	OUL; 3 Ret	CRO; 1; 17	CRO; 2; 12	CRO; 3 Ret	SNE; 1; 7	SNE; 2; 5	SNE; 3 Ret	ROC; 1; 4	ROC; 2; 7	ROC; 3; 1*	KNO; 1; 8	KNO; 2; 10	KNO; 3; 11	SIL; 1; 25	SIL; 2; 18	SIL; 3 Ret	BRH; 1; 29	BRH; 2; 12	BRH; 3; 8	13th	152
2019	BTC Racing	Honda Civic Type R (FK8)	BRH; 1 Ret	BRH; 2; 20	BRH; 3; 7	DON; 1; 7	DON; 2 Ret	DON; 3; 11	THR; 1; 14	THR; 2; 15	THR; 3; 11	CRO; 1; 2	CRO; 2; 27	CRO; 3; 24	OUL; 1; 16	OUL; 2 Ret	OUL; 3 Ret	SNE; 1; 14	SNE; 2; 8	**SNE**; **3**; 3	THR; 1; 10	THR; 2; 21	THR; 3; 17	KNO; 1; 6	KNO; 2; 11	KNO; 3; 4	SIL; 1; 3	SIL; 2; 6	SIL; 3 Ret	BRH; 1 Ret	BRH; 2; 24	BRH; 3 Ret	14th	132
2020	Excelr8 Motorsport	Hyundai i30 Fastback N Performance	DON; 1; 8	DON; 2; 12	**DON**; **3**; 2*	BRH; 1; 15	BRH; 2; 13	BRH; 3 Ret	OUL; 1; 9	OUL; 2; 14	OUL; 3; 9	KNO; 1; 14	KNO; 2; 9	KNO; 3; 7	THR; 1; 13	THR; 2; 16	THR; 3; 16	SIL; 1; 16	SIL; 2; 15	SIL; 3; 13	CRO; 1; 12	CRO; 2; 12	CRO; 3; 19	SNE; 1; 11	SNE; 2; 10	**SNE**; **3**; 23	BRH; 1; 13	BRH; 2; 11	BRH; 3; 12				14th	106
2021	Ginsters Excelr8 with TradePriceCars.com	Hyundai i30 Fastback N Performance	THR; 1 Ret	THR; 2 Ret	THR; 3; 15	SNE; 1; 10	SNE; 2; 13	SNE; 3; 11	BRH; 1; 7	BRH; 2; 7	BRH; 3; 10	OUL; 1 Ret	OUL; 2; 14	OUL; 3; 10	KNO; 1; 5	KNO; 2; 13	KNO; 3; 6	THR; 1; 16	THR; 2; 11	THR; 3; 9	CRO; 1; 7	CRO; 2; 11	CRO; 3 Ret	SIL; 1; 13	SIL; 2; 7	SIL; 3; 4	DON; 1; 9	DON; 2; 12	DON; 3; 16	BRH; 1; 15	BRH; 2 Ret	BRH; 3; 12	15th	138
2024	Restart Racing	Cupra Léon	DON; 1; 15	DON; 2; 14	DON; 3 Ret	BRH; 1; 14	BRH; 2; 17	BRH; 3; 13	SNE; 1; 18	SNE; 2; 13	SNE; 3 Ret	THR; 1; 17	THR; 2; 16	THR; 3; 14	OUL; 1; 13	OUL; 2; 8	OUL; 3; 9	CRO; 1; 15	CRO; 2 Ret	CRO; 3; 11	KNO; 1; 13	KNO; 2; 13	KNO; 3; 13	DON; 1; 13	DON; 2; 15	DON; 3 Ret	SIL; 1; 13	SIL; 2; 6	**SIL**; **3**; 16	BRH; 1; 13	BRH; 2; 12	BRH; 3; 16	17th	70
2025	Restart Racing	Hyundai i30 Fastback N Performance	DON; 1; 10	DON; 2; 8	DON; 3; 8	BRH; 1; 12	BRH; 2; 4	BRH; 3; 5	SNE; 1; 8	SNE; 2; 5	SNE; 3 Ret	THR; 1; 11	THR; 2; 8	THR; 3 DSQ	OUL; 1; 3	OUL; 2; 14	OUL; 3 Ret	CRO; 1 Ret	CRO; 2; 13	CRO; 3 Ret	KNO; 1; 12	KNO; 2; 12	KNO; 3; 11	DON; 1; 9	DON; 2 DSQ	DON; 3; 21	SIL; 1; 15	SIL; 2; 15	SIL; 3; 18	BRH; 1; 10	BRH; 2; 11	BRH; 3; 12	14th	140
2026	Restart Racing	Hyundai i30 Fastback N Performance	DON; 1; 16^{14}	DON; 2; 12	DON; 3; 7	BRH; 1; 8^{13}	BRH; 2; 12	BRH; 3; 18	SNE; 1; 15	SNE; 2; 9	SNE; 3; 4	OUL; 1; 9^{10}	OUL; 2; 11	**OUL**; **3**; 7*	THR; 1; 11^{12}	THR; 2; 17	THR; 3; 13	KNO; 1; 16^{4}	KNO; 2 Ret	KNO; 3; 14	DON; 1; 16^{13}	DON; 2; 10	**DON**; **3** Ret	CRO; 1; 22^{9}	CRO; 2; 14	CRO; 3; 11	SIL; 1; 11	SIL; 2; 18	SIL; 3; 13	BRH; 1; 18^{13}	BRH; 2; 19	BRH; 3; 12	16th	127

Sporting positions
Preceded by Lee Allen	Mini Challenge UK; Champion; 2013	Succeeded by Chris Knox
Preceded by Lewis Kent	TCR UK Touring Car Championship; Champion; 2022	Succeeded by Carl Boardley
