= 2019 British Touring Car Championship =

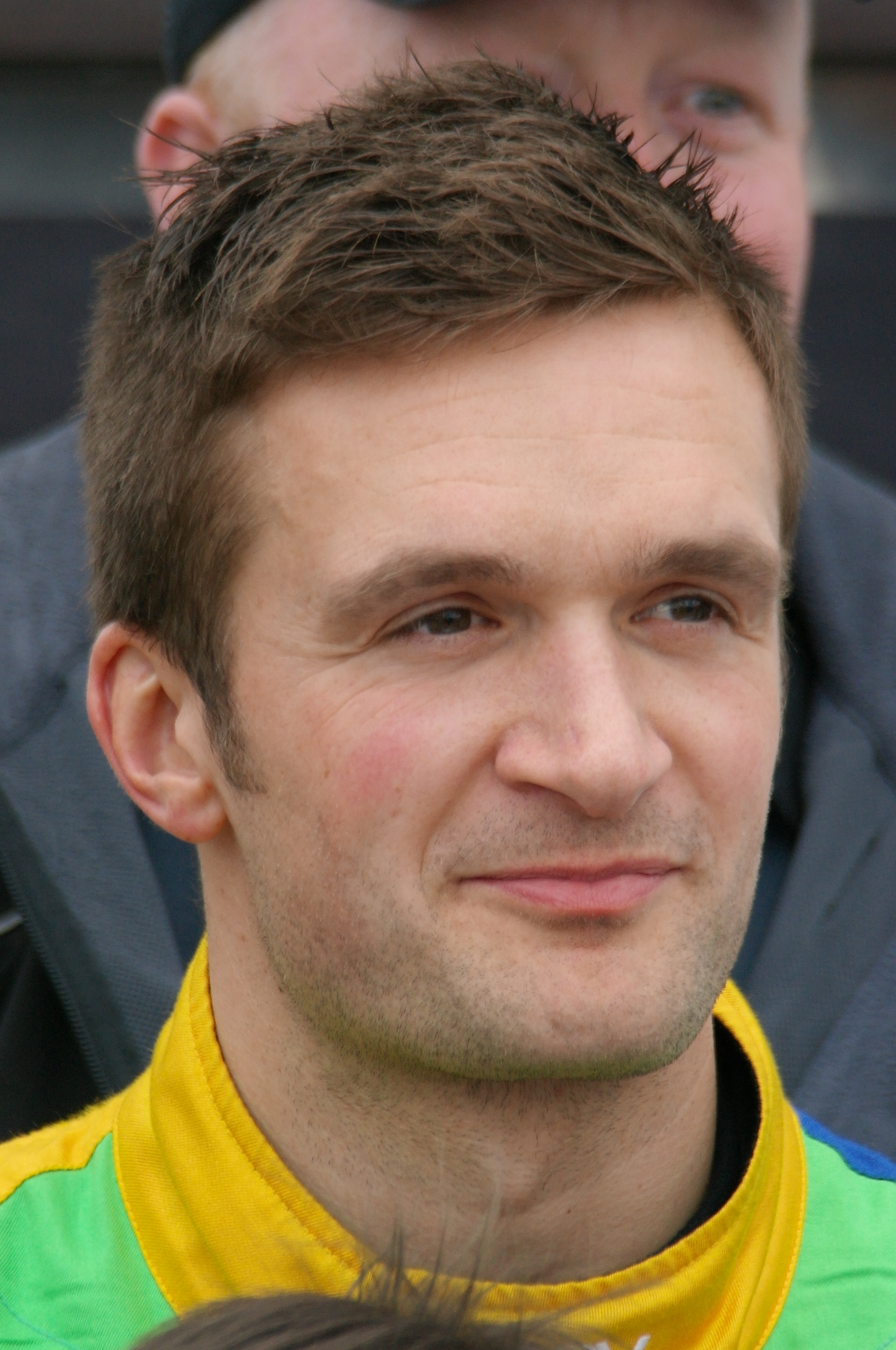
Colin Turkington successfully defended the Drivers' Championship, winning his fourth title.

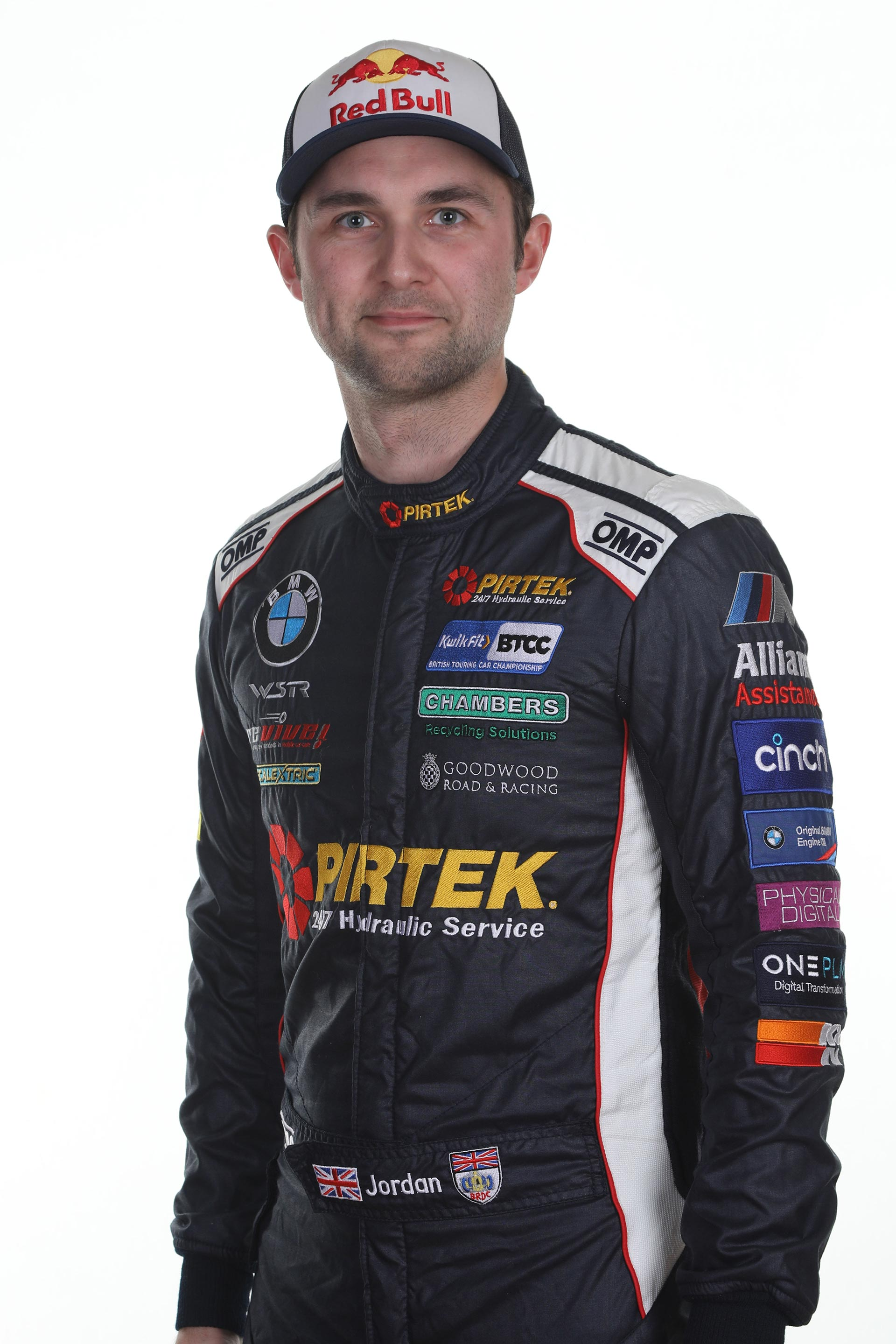
Andrew Jordan finished runner-up in the Drivers' Championship by 2 points.

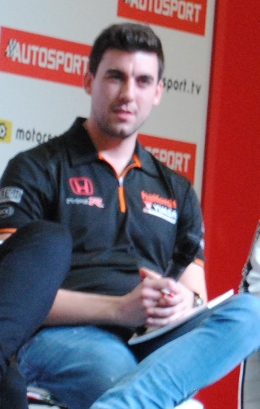
Dan Cammish finished third in the Drivers' Championship.

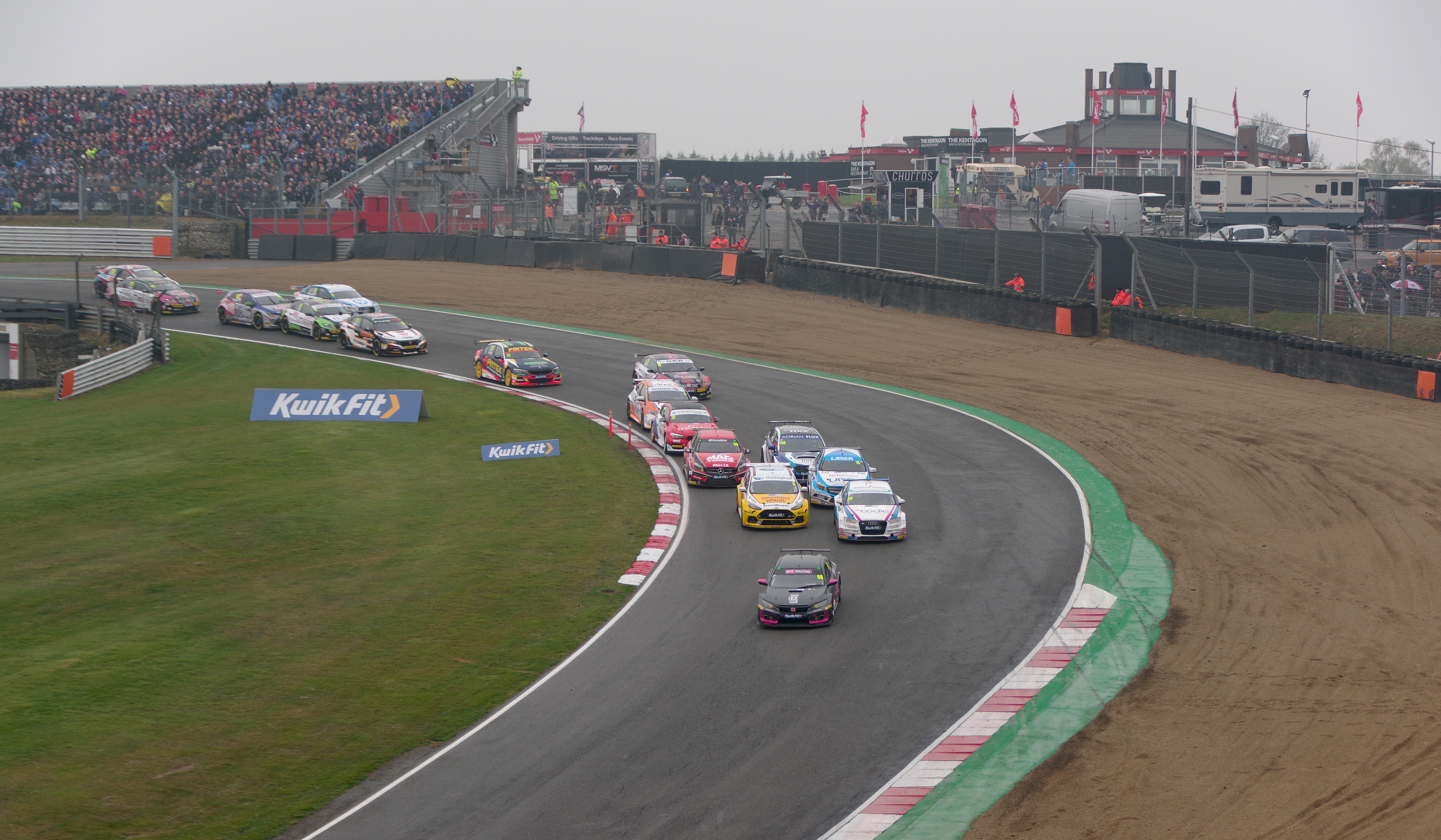
Start of a race at Brands Hatch.

The 2019 Kwik Fit British Touring Car Championship (commonly abbreviated as BTCC) was a motor racing championship for production-based touring cars held across England and Scotland. The championship featured a mix of professional motor racing teams and privately funded amateur drivers competing in highly modified versions of family cars which are sold to the general public and conform to the technical regulations for the championship. The 2019 season was the 62nd British Touring Car Championship season and the ninth season for cars conforming to the Next Generation Touring Car (NGTC) technical specification. Colin Turkington successfully defended his title to equal Andy Rouse as the only four time BTCC Champions.

== Teams and drivers ==
Key
Eligible for the Jack Sears Trophy for drivers yet to record an overall podium finish or Jack Sears Trophy championship at the start of the season.

Team	Car	Engine	No.	Drivers	Rounds
Constructor Entries
Team BMW	BMW 330i M Sport	BMW/Neil Brown	1	(United Kingdom) Colin Turkington	All
Team BMW	BMW 330i M Sport	BMW/Neil Brown	15	(United Kingdom) Tom Oliphant	All
BMW Pirtek Racing	BMW 330i M Sport	BMW/Neil Brown	77	(United Kingdom) Andrew Jordan	All
Sterling Insurance with Power Maxed Racing	Vauxhall Astra	TOCA/Swindon	9	(United Kingdom) Rob Collard	All
Sterling Insurance with Power Maxed Racing	Vauxhall Astra	TOCA/Swindon	11	(United Kingdom) Jason Plato	All
Adrian Flux Subaru Racing	Subaru Levorg GT	Subaru/Swindon	18	(United Kingdom) Senna Proctor	All
Adrian Flux Subaru Racing	Subaru Levorg GT	Subaru/Swindon	116	(United Kingdom) Ashley Sutton	All
Halfords Yuasa Racing	Honda Civic Type R (FK8)	Honda/Neil Brown	25	(United Kingdom) Matt Neal	All
Halfords Yuasa Racing	Honda Civic Type R (FK8)	Honda/Neil Brown	27	(United Kingdom) Dan Cammish	All
Team Toyota GB with Ginsters	Toyota Corolla	TOCA/Swindon	80	(United Kingdom) Tom Ingram	All
Independent Entries
Team Shredded Wheat Racing with Gallagher	Ford Focus RS	Ford/Mountune	3	(United Kingdom) Tom Chilton	All
Team Shredded Wheat Racing with Gallagher	Ford Focus RS	Ford/Mountune	48	(United Kingdom) Ollie Jackson	All
ROKiT Racing with Motorbase	Ford Focus RS	Ford/Mountune	28	(United Kingdom) Nicolas Hamilton	1–8
Motorbase Performance	Ford Focus RS	Ford/Mountune	44	(United Kingdom) Michael Caine	9–10
Excelr8 Motorsport	MG6 GT	TOCA/Swindon	4	(United Kingdom) Sam Osborne	All
Excelr8 Motorsport	MG6 GT	TOCA/Swindon	37	(United Kingdom) Rob Smith	All
Cobra Sport AmD AutoAid/RCIB Insurance	Honda Civic Type R (FK2)	TOCA/Swindon	6	(United Kingdom) Rory Butcher	All
Cobra Sport AmD AutoAid/RCIB Insurance	Honda Civic Type R (FK2)	TOCA/Swindon	21	(United Kingdom) Mike Bushell	8–10
Cobra Sport AmD AutoAid/RCIB Insurance	Honda Civic Type R (FK2)	TOCA/Swindon	600	(United Kingdom) Sam Tordoff	1–7
TradePriceCars.com	Audi S3 Saloon	TOCA/Swindon	8	(United Kingdom) Mark Blundell	All
TradePriceCars.com	Audi S3 Saloon	TOCA/Swindon	24	(United Kingdom) Jake Hill	All
Team Parker Racing	BMW 125i M Sport	BMW/Neil Brown	12	(United Kingdom) Stephen Jelley	All
Laser Tools Racing	Mercedes-Benz A-Class	TOCA/Swindon	16	(United Kingdom) Aiden Moffat	1–5
Laser Tools Racing	Infiniti Q50	TOCA/Swindon	16	(United Kingdom) Aiden Moffat	6–10
GKR Scaffolding with Autobrite Direct	Volkswagen CC	TOCA/Swindon	19	(United Kingdom) Bobby Thompson	All
GKR Scaffolding with Autobrite Direct	Volkswagen CC	TOCA/Swindon	777	(United Kingdom) Michael Crees	All
RCIB Insurance with Fox Transport	Volkswagen CC	TOCA/Swindon	31	(United Kingdom) Jack Goff	All
RCIB Insurance with Fox Transport	Volkswagen CC	TOCA/Swindon	41	(United Kingdom) Carl Boardley	All
BTC Racing	Honda Civic Type R (FK8)	Honda/Neil Brown	22	(United Kingdom) Chris Smiley	All
BTC Racing	Honda Civic Type R (FK8)	Honda/Neil Brown	66	(United Kingdom) Josh Cook	All
Cataclean Racing with Ciceley Motorsport	Mercedes-Benz A-Class	TOCA/Swindon	32	(United Kingdom) Daniel Rowbottom	All
Mac Tools with Ciceley Motorsport	Mercedes-Benz A-Class	TOCA/Swindon	33	(United Kingdom) Adam Morgan	All
Simpson Racing	Honda Civic Type R (FK2)	Honda/Neil Brown	303	(United Kingdom) Matt Simpson	All

=== Drivers and teams changes ===
Changed teams

- Jack Goff secured a last-minute drive with RCIB Insurance with Fox Transport after Mike Bushell left the series for the Renault UK Clio Cup.
- Tom Oliphant will debut with Team BMW after driving for Ciceley Motorsport in 2018.
- Jason Plato and Rob Collard moved from Adrian Flux Subaru Racing and Team BMW to Sterling Insurance with Power Maxed Racing.
- Josh Cook moved from Power Maxed Racing to BTC Racing.
- Ollie Jackson moved from AmDTuning.Com to Team Shredded Wheat Racing with Gallagher.
- Sam Tordoff moved from Motorbase Performance to Cobra Sport AmD AutoAid/RCIB Insurance.
- Senna Proctor moved from Power Maxed Racing to Adrian Flux Subaru Racing.
- Jake Hill moved from Team HARD. to TradePriceCars.com.

Entering/re-entering BTCC

- Nicolas Hamilton returned to the series after racing in the Renault UK Clio Cup in 2017-18, driving a third car for Motorbase Performance under the RoKit Racing banner, having last raced in 2015.
- Ex-Formula One driver Mark Blundell made his series debut, with TradePriceCars.com.
- Mini Challenge UK drivers Rob Smith and Sam Osborne both made their series debut with Excelr8 Motorsport.
- 2018 Ginetta GT4 Supercup Am champion Michael Crees made his series debut, with GKR Scaffolding with Autobrite Direct.
- Daniel Rowbottom made his series debut, with Ciceley Motorsport.

Leaving BTCC

- Mike Bushell left the series for the Renault UK Clio Cup to open up a space in Team HARD's BTCC line-up.
- Ethan Hammerton left the series to compete in the Renault UK Clio Cup with Team HARD.
- 2018 TCR UK champion Daniel Lloyd left the series to race in the 2019 TCR Europe and TCR China Touring Car series.
- Sam Smelt left the series to race in the British GT Championship with Árón Taylor-Smith.
- Rob Austin left the series as he was unable to secure an entry into the 2019 season.
- Brett Smith left the series to compete in the VW Racing Cup

Team changes

- West Surrey Racing switched from running the BMW 125i M Sport to the newer BMW 330i M Sport.
- BTC Racing switched from running the Honda Civic Type R (FK2) to the newer Honda Civic Type R (FK8).
- AmDTuning.Com switched their two MG6 GTs for two Honda Civic Type R (FK2).
- HMS Racing left the series as they were unable to secure an entry into the 2019 season.
- Eurotech Racing withdrew from the BTCC after the 2018 season.

Mid season changes

- Laser Tools Racing switched from running the Mercedes-Benz A-Class to the Infiniti Q50 after the Oulton Park round.
- Sam Tordoff withdrew from the season ahead of the Knockhill round for personal reasons. Mike Bushell replaced him for the remainder of the season.
- Nicolas Hamilton pulled out of the rest of the season after the Knockhill round due to sponsorship problems. Michael Caine subsequently replaced him for the remainder of the season.

== Race calendar ==
The championship calendar was announced by the championship organisers on 13 June 2018. Rockingham Motor Speedway will be replaced in the calendar by a second Thruxton Circuit round.

2019 BTCC Race Locations

Round		Circuit	Date
1	R1	Brands Hatch (Indy Circuit, Kent)	6–7 April
1	R2	Brands Hatch (Indy Circuit, Kent)	6–7 April
1	R3	Brands Hatch (Indy Circuit, Kent)	6–7 April
2	R4	Donington Park (National Circuit, Leicestershire)	27–28 April
2	R5	Donington Park (National Circuit, Leicestershire)	27–28 April
2	R6	Donington Park (National Circuit, Leicestershire)	27–28 April
3	R7	Thruxton Circuit (Hampshire)	18–19 May
3	R8	Thruxton Circuit (Hampshire)	18–19 May
3	R9	Thruxton Circuit (Hampshire)	18–19 May
4	R10	Croft Circuit (North Yorkshire)	15–16 June
4	R11	Croft Circuit (North Yorkshire)	15–16 June
4	R12	Croft Circuit (North Yorkshire)	15–16 June
5	R13	Oulton Park (Island Circuit, Cheshire)	29–30 June
5	R14	Oulton Park (Island Circuit, Cheshire)	29–30 June
5	R15	Oulton Park (Island Circuit, Cheshire)	29–30 June
6	R16	Snetterton Motor Racing Circuit (300 Circuit, Norfolk)	3–4 August
6	R17	Snetterton Motor Racing Circuit (300 Circuit, Norfolk)	3–4 August
6	R18	Snetterton Motor Racing Circuit (300 Circuit, Norfolk)	3–4 August
7	R19	Thruxton Circuit (Hampshire)	17–18 August
7	R20	Thruxton Circuit (Hampshire)	17–18 August
7	R21	Thruxton Circuit (Hampshire)	17–18 August
8	R22	Knockhill Racing Circuit (Fife)	14–15 September
8	R23	Knockhill Racing Circuit (Fife)	14–15 September
8	R24	Knockhill Racing Circuit (Fife)	14–15 September
9	R25	Silverstone Circuit (National Circuit, Northamptonshire)	28–29 September
9	R26	Silverstone Circuit (National Circuit, Northamptonshire)	28–29 September
9	R27	Silverstone Circuit (National Circuit, Northamptonshire)	28–29 September
10	R28	Brands Hatch (Grand Prix Circuit, Kent)	12–13 October
10	R29	Brands Hatch (Grand Prix Circuit, Kent)	12–13 October
10	R30	Brands Hatch (Grand Prix Circuit, Kent)	12–13 October

== Results ==
Round		Circuit	Pole position	Fastest lap	Winning driver	Winning team	Winning independent	Winning JST
1	R1	Brands Hatch Indy	Ashley Sutton	Bobby Thompson	Josh Cook	BTC Racing	Josh Cook	Bobby Thompson
1	R2	Brands Hatch Indy		Andrew Jordan	Andrew Jordan	BMW Pirtek Racing	Adam Morgan	Rory Butcher
1	R3	Brands Hatch Indy		Colin Turkington	Rory Butcher	Cobra Sport AMD Autoaid/RCIB Insurance	Rory Butcher	Rory Butcher
2	R4	Donington Park	Colin Turkington	Colin Turkington	Colin Turkington	Team BMW	Chris Smiley	Tom Oliphant
2	R5	Donington Park		Rory Butcher	Colin Turkington	Team BMW	Tom Chilton	Rory Butcher
2	R6	Donington Park		Rob Collard	Tom Ingram	Team Toyota GB with Ginsters	Josh Cook	Rory Butcher
3	R7	Thruxton Circuit	Sam Tordoff	Dan Cammish	Andrew Jordan	BMW Pirtek Racing	Sam Tordoff	Rory Butcher
3	R8	Thruxton Circuit		Rory Butcher	Andrew Jordan	BMW Pirtek Racing	Sam Tordoff	Rory Butcher
3	R9	Thruxton Circuit		Josh Cook	Josh Cook	BTC Racing	Josh Cook	Rory Butcher
4	R10	Croft Circuit	Andrew Jordan	Andrew Jordan	Andrew Jordan	BMW Pirtek Racing	Chris Smiley	Tom Oliphant
4	R11	Croft Circuit		Colin Turkington	Andrew Jordan	BMW Pirtek Racing	Josh Cook	Rory Butcher
4	R12	Croft Circuit		Tom Ingram	Tom Chilton	Team Shredded Wheat Racing with Gallagher	Tom Chilton	Rory Butcher
5	R13	Oulton Park	Colin Turkington	Dan Cammish	Colin Turkington	Team BMW	Rory Butcher	Rory Butcher
5	R14	Oulton Park		Colin Turkington	Colin Turkington	Team BMW	Sam Tordoff	Tom Oliphant
5	R15	Oulton Park		Rory Butcher	Stephen Jelley	Team Parker Racing	Stephen Jelley	Tom Oliphant
6	R16	Snetterton	Tom Ingram	Dan Cammish	Tom Ingram	Team Toyota GB with Ginsters	Sam Tordoff	Rory Butcher
6	R17	Snetterton		Andrew Jordan	Colin Turkington	Team BMW	Ollie Jackson	Tom Oliphant
6	R18	Snetterton		Stephen Jelley	Rory Butcher	Cobra Sport AMD Autoaid/RCIB Insurance	Rory Butcher	Rory Butcher
7	R19	Thruxton Circuit	Sam Tordoff	Sam Tordoff	Sam Tordoff	Cobra Sport AMD Autoaid/RCIB Insurance	Sam Tordoff	Tom Oliphant
7	R20	Thruxton Circuit		Josh Cook	Josh Cook	BTC Racing	Josh Cook	Tom Oliphant
7	R21	Thruxton Circuit		Jason Plato	Dan Cammish	Halfords Yuasa Racing	Adam Morgan	Tom Oliphant
8	R22	Knockhill Racing Circuit	Rory Butcher	Tom Oliphant	Rory Butcher	Cobra Sport AMD Autoaid/RCIB Insurance	Rory Butcher	Rory Butcher
8	R23	Knockhill Racing Circuit		Mike Bushell	Andrew Jordan	BMW Pirtek Racing	Rory Butcher	Rory Butcher
8	R24	Knockhill Racing Circuit		Tom Oliphant	Jake Hill	TradePriceCars.com	Jake Hill	Tom Oliphant
9	R25	Silverstone Circuit	Jason Plato	Ashley Sutton	Tom Ingram	Team Toyota GB with Ginsters	Chris Smiley	Tom Oliphant
9	R26	Silverstone Circuit		Colin Turkington	Tom Ingram	Team Toyota GB with Ginsters	Josh Cook	Tom Oliphant
9	R27	Silverstone Circuit		Jack Goff	Jack Goff	RCIB Insurance with Fox Transport	Jack Goff	Tom Oliphant
10	R28	Brands Hatch GP	Colin Turkington	Tom Oliphant	Dan Cammish	Halfords Yuasa Racing	Tom Chilton	Rory Butcher
10	R29	Brands Hatch GP		Jake Hill	Ashley Sutton	Adrian Flux Subaru Racing	Tom Chilton	Michael Caine
10	R30	Brands Hatch GP		Josh Cook	Jason Plato	Sterling Insurance with Power Maxed Racing	Rory Butcher	Rory Butcher

== Championship standings ==
Points system
1st	2nd	3rd	4th	5th	6th	7th	8th	9th	10th	11th	12th	13th	14th	15th	R1 PP	Fastest lap	Lead a lap
20	17	15	13	11	10	9	8	7	6	5	4	3	2	1	1	1	1

Notes

- No driver may collect more than one point for leading a lap per race regardless of how many laps they lead.

=== Drivers' Championship ===
(key)

Pos.	Driver	BHI			DON			THR			CRO			OUL			SNE			THR			KNO			SIL			BHGP			Pts
1	Colin Turkington	19	14	5	1*	1*	9	4	2	9	4	2	6	1*	1*	8	4	1*	9	13	9	13	4	19	10	14	2	7	5*	25	6	320
2	Andrew Jordan	15	1*	24	Ret	DNS	DNS	1*	1*	17	1*	1*	8	3	2	4	5	3	5	12	7	10	2*	1*	Ret	10	8	8	8	2	4	318
3	Dan Cammish	16	12	14	6	13	10	3	3	6	6	3	10	2	3	17	2	2	15	2	5	1*	3	2	6	11	3	12	1*	3*	Ret	318
4	Josh Cook	1*	7*	4	24	8	3	11	10	1*	9	8	2	17	10	6	20	15	2	4	1*	6	13	9	2	4	5	NC*	Ret	13	5	278
5	Rory Butcher	10	8	1	11	5	4	5	7	2	18	14	7	4	7	5	11	12	1*	7	14	DNS	1*	3	14	15	Ret	16	4	9	2	266
6	Tom Ingram	13	5	10	5	10	1*	12	8	5	11	7	16	7	8	Ret	1*	23*	8	11	8	8	8	6	5	1*	1*	22	23	21	7	245
7	Jason Plato	25	21	13	9	6	7	6	4	8	8	6	3	9	9	Ret	6	6	17*	17	13	5	12	8	8	2*	4	6	14	7	1*	237
8	Ashley Sutton	9*	2*	25	2	3	5	9	11	3	7	5	4	8	16	7	12	7	20	9	11	9	Ret	16	12	24	11	15*	11*	1*	3	233
9	Matt Neal	8	11	8*	4	2	18	7	5	4	10	4	5	Ret	11	11	Ret	16	11	8	3	3	Ret	15	11	6	Ret	3	2	4	13	232
10	Tom Chilton	3	9	2*	8	4	12	18	25	13	3	9	1*	12	Ret	12	Ret	17	12	22	12	22	7	5	7	9	20	5	3	5	Ret	200
11	Tom Oliphant	22	15	6	3	17	13	23	14	7	5	18	23	6	4	2	16	11	Ret	5	4	7	15	14	13	5	7*	4	16	Ret	10	178
12	Adam Morgan	5	3	11	Ret	12	8	17	13	Ret	16	11	9	Ret	19	10	Ret	18	Ret	3	2	4	9	7	3	8	Ret	Ret	19	26	9	155
13	Sam Tordoff	Ret	19	16	13	14	15	2*	6	Ret	23	15	13	5	5	3	3	5	6	1*	10*	11										147
14	Chris Smiley	Ret	20	7	7	Ret	11	14	15	11	2	27	24	16	Ret	Ret	14	8	3	10	21	17	6	11	4	3	6	Ret	Ret	24	Ret	132
15	Jake Hill	2	4	Ret	Ret	9	6	10	12	18	12	Ret	DNS	13	12	14*	10	10	Ret	16	15	12	10	10	1*	16	16	11	Ret	19	12	131
16	Rob Collard	21	22	Ret	10	7	2	8	9	14	Ret	19	26	15	22	23	7	14	4	6	6	2*	NC	17	16	12	NC	21	15	17	18	118
17	Stephen Jelley	7	6	3*	17	Ret	20	13	18	12	14	12	28	11	6	1	25	Ret	16	19	16	23	Ret	Ret	17	Ret	Ret	23	7	10	11*	105
18	Aiden Moffat	4	17	9	14	NC	14	20	17	10	13	10	18	18	14	9	17	19	21	18	24	21	11	13	9	19	NC	2	13	12	14	89
19	Ollie Jackson	Ret	18	Ret	Ret	11	16	16	Ret	16	Ret	20	11	10	13	13	8	4	7	15	18	15	Ret	18	15	18	14	19	10	6	8	81
20	Senna Proctor	17	10	22	12	20	21	22	16	15	15	13	12	DSQ	18	20	19	Ret	Ret	29	29	20	5	4	Ret	25	15	NC	Ret	11	21	49
21	Jack Goff	11	16	12	15	NC	Ret	21	19	Ret	17	16	Ret	14	Ret	DNS	18	Ret	10	24	19	18	19	Ret	26	17	21	1*	9	Ret	DNS	47
22	Bobby Thompson	6	13	15	18	Ret	Ret	30	22	20	Ret	23	14	19	21	Ret	13	13	Ret	14	22	19	18	21	20	Ret	13	10	21	16	15	35
23	Matt Simpson	18	NC	21	Ret	Ret	Ret	15	21	19	NC	17	25	23	20	Ret	9	9	13	21	17	16	14	12	Ret	13	10	Ret	Ret	27	Ret	33
24	Mike Bushell																						Ret	Ret	Ret	7	9	17	6	18	16	27
25	Michael Caine																									20	12	18	12	8	17	16
26	Michael Crees	12	23	18	21	16	Ret	26	26	22	Ret	25	27	26	24	22	27	22	Ret	23	25	25	Ret	27	24	Ret	19	9	24	23	Ret	11
27	Mark Blundell	14	27	19	23	Ret	22	27	Ret	Ret	21	26	19	Ret	23	18	23	21	Ret	27	26	27	20	24	21	Ret	18	13	22	Ret	20	5
28	Daniel Rowbottom	23	Ret	23	19	21	17	19	24	Ret	20	21	17	21	15	16	15	Ret	Ret	20	20	14	17	23	18	26	17	Ret	18	15	Ret	5
29	Carl Boardley	NC	25	Ret	20	15	Ret	29	23	Ret	19	22	15	20	17	15	21	Ret	Ret	30	Ret	Ret	16	20	19	23	Ret	Ret	17	14	19	5
30	Rob Smith	Ret	24	17	16	18	19	25	20	23	22	24	22	24	Ret	DNS	26	Ret	19	25	23	24	21	22	23	22	22	14	20	20	22	2
31	Sam Osborne	24	28	Ret	22	Ret	23	28	27	21	Ret	Ret	21	25	Ret	21	24	24	14	28	28	26	22	25	22	21	Ret	20	Ret	22	Ret	2
32	Nicolas Hamilton	20	26	20	Ret	19	Ret	24	Ret	24	24	28	20	22	25	19	22	20	18	26	27	Ret	Ret	26	25							0
Pos.	Driver	BHI			DON			THR			CRO			OUL			SNE			THR			KNO			SIL			BHGP			Pts

=== Manufacturers'/Constructors' Championship ===
Pos.	Manufacturer/Constructor	BHI			DON			THR			CRO			OUL			SNE			THR			KNO			SIL			BHGP			Pts
1	BMW / West Surrey Racing	15	1	5	1	1	9	1	1	7	1	1	6	1	1	2	4	1	5	5	4	7	2	1	10	5	2	4	5	2	4	810
1	BMW / West Surrey Racing	19	14	6	3	17	13	4	2	9	4	2	8	3	2	4	5	3	9	12	7	10	4	14	13	10	7	7	8	25	6	810
2	Honda / Team Dynamics	8	11	8	4	2	10	3	3	4	6	3	5	2	3	11	2	2	11	2	3	1	3	2	6	6	3	3	1	3	13	769
2	Honda / Team Dynamics	16	12	14	6	13	18	7	5	6	10	4	10	Ret	11	17	Ret	16	15	8	5	3	Ret	15	11	11	Ret	12	2	4	Ret	769
3	Vauxhall / Power Maxed Racing	21	21	13	9	6	2	6	4	8	8	6	3	9	9	23	6	6	4	6	6	2	12	8	8	2	4	6	14	7	1	620
3	Vauxhall / Power Maxed Racing	25	22	Ret	10	7	7	8	9	14	Ret	19	26	15	22	Ret	7	14	17	17	13	5	NC	17	16	12	NC	21	15	17	18	620
4	Subaru / Team BMR	9	2	22	2	3	5	9	11	3	7	5	4	8	16	7	12	7	20	9	11	9	5	4	12	24	11	15	11	1	3	572
4	Subaru / Team BMR	17	10	25	12	20	21	22	16	15	15	13	12	DSQ	18	20	19	Ret	Ret	29	29	20	Ret	16	Ret	25	15	NC	Ret	11	21	572
5	Toyota / Speedworks Motorsport	13	5	10	5	10	1	12	8	5	11	7	16	7	8	Ret	1	23	8	11	8	8	8	6	5	1	1	22	23	21	7	368
Pos.	Manufacturer/Constructor	BHI			DON			THR			CRO			OUL			SNE			THR			KNO			SIL			BHGP			Pts

=== Teams' Championship ===
Pos.	Team	BHI			DON			THR			CRO			OUL			SNE			THR			KNO			SIL			BHGP			Pts
1	Halfords Yuasa Racing	8	11	8	4	2	10	3	3	4	6	3	5	2	3	11	2	2	11	2	3	1	3	2	6	6	3	3	1	3	13	543
1	Halfords Yuasa Racing	16	12	14	6	13	18	7	5	6	10	4	10	Ret	11	17	Ret	16	11	8	5	3	Ret	15	11	11	Ret	12	2	4	Ret	543
2	Team BMW	19	14	5	1	1	9	4	2	7	4	2	6	1	1	2	4	1	9	5	4	7	4	14	10	5	2	4	5	25	6	480
2	Team BMW	22	15	6	3	17	13	23	14	9	5	18	23	6	4	8	16	11	Ret	13	9	13	15	19	13	14	7	7	16	Ret	10	480
3	Cobra Sport AmD AutoAid/RCIB Insurance	10	8	1	11	5	4	2	6	2	18	14	7	4	5	3	3	5	1	1	10	11	1	3	14	7	9	16	4	9	2	426
3	Cobra Sport AmD AutoAid/RCIB Insurance	Ret	19	16	13	14	15	5	7	Ret	Ret	23	15	5	7	5	11	12	6	7	14	DNS	Ret	Ret	Ret	15	Ret	17	6	18	16	426
4	BTC Racing	1	7	4	7	8	3	11	10	1	2	8	2	16	10	6	14	8	2	4	1	6	6	9	2	3	5	NC	Ret	13	5	402
4	BTC Racing	Ret	20	7	7	Ret	11	14	15	11	9	27	24	17	Ret	Ret	20	15	3	10	21	17	13	11	4	4	6	Ret	Ret	24	Ret	402
5	Sterling Insurance with Power Maxed Racing	21	21	13	9	6	2	6	4	8	8	6	3	9	9	23	6	6	4	6	6	2	12	8	8	2	4	6	14	7	1	348
5	Sterling Insurance with Power Maxed Racing	25	22	Ret	10	7	7	8	9	14	Ret	19	26	15	22	23	7	14	17	17	13	5	NC	17	16	12	NC	21	15	17	18	348
6	BMW Pirtek Racing	15	1	24	Ret	DNS	DNS	1	1	17	1	1	8	3	2	4	5	3	5	12	7	10	2	1	Ret	10	8	8	8	2	4	307
7	Team Shredded Wheat Racing with Gallagher	3	9	2	8	4	12	16	25	13	3	9	1	10	13	12	8	4	7	15	12	15	7	5	7	9	14	5	3	5	8	279
7	Team Shredded Wheat Racing with Gallagher	Ret	18	Ret	Ret	11	16	18	Ret	16	Ret	20	11	12	Ret	13	Ret	17	12	22	18	22	Ret	18	15	18	20	19	10	6	Ret	279
8	Adrian Flux Subaru Racing	9	2	22	2	3	5	9	11	3	7	5	4	8	16	7	12	7	20	9	11	9	5	4	12	24	11	15	11	1	3	275
8	Adrian Flux Subaru Racing	17	10	22	12	20	21	22	16	15	15	13	12	DSQ	18	20	19	Ret	Ret	29	29	20	Ret	16	Ret	25	15	NC	Ret	11	21	275
9	Team Toyota GB with Ginsters	13	5	10	5	10	1	12	8	5	11	7	16	7	8	Ret	1	23	8	11	8	8	8	6	5	1	1	22	23	21	7	238
10	Mac Tools with Ciceley Motorsport	5	3	11	Ret	12	8	17	13	Ret	16	11	9	Ret	19	10	Ret	18	Ret	3	2	4	9	7	3	8	Ret	Ret	19	26	9	155
11	TradePriceCars.com	2	4	19	23	9	6	10	12	18	12	26	19	13	12	14	10	10	Ret	16	15	12	10	10	1	16	16	11	22	19	12	133
11	TradePriceCars.com	14	27	19	23	Ret	22	27	Ret	Ret	21	26	19	Ret	23	18	23	21	Ret	27	26	27	20	24	21	Ret	18	13	Ret	Ret	20	133
12	Team Parker Racing	7	6	3	17	Ret	20	13	18	12	14	12	28	11	6	1	25	Ret	16	19	16	23	Ret	Ret	17	Ret	Ret	23	7	10	11	92
13	Laser Tools Racing	4	17	9	14	NC	14	20	17	10	13	10	18	18	14	9	17	19	21	18	24	21	11	13	9	19	NC	2	13	12	14	89
14	RCIB Insurance with Fox Transport	11	16	12	15	15	Ret	21	19	Ret	17	16	15	14	17	15	18	Ret	10	24	19	18	16	20	19	17	21	1	9	14	19	50
14	RCIB Insurance with Fox Transport	NC	25	Ret	20	NC	Ret	29	23	DNS	19	22	15	20	Ret	DNS	21	DNS	Ret	30	Ret	Ret	19	Ret	26	23	Ret	Ret	17	Ret	DNS	50
15	GKR Scaffolding with Autobrite Direct	6	13	15	18	16	Ret	26	22	20	Ret	23	14	19	21	22	13	13	Ret	14	22	19	18	21	20	Ret	13	9	21	16	15	45
15	GKR Scaffolding with Autobrite Direct	12	23	18	21	Ret	Ret	30	26	22	Ret	25	27	26	24	Ret	27	22	Ret	23	25	25	Ret	27	24	Ret	19	10	24	23	Ret	45
16	Simpson Racing	18	NC	21	Ret	Ret	Ret	15	21	19	NC	17	25	23	20	Ret	9	9	13	21	17	16	14	12	Ret	13	10	Ret	Ret	27	Ret	33
17	Motorbase Performance																									20	12	18	12	8	17	16
18	Cataclean Racing with Ciceley Motorsport	23	Ret	23	19	21	17	19	24	Ret	20	21	17	21	15	16	15	Ret	Ret	20	20	14	17	23	18	26	17	Ret	18	15	Ret	5
19	Excelr8 Motorsport	24	24	17	16	18	19	25	20	21	22	24	21	24	Ret	21	24	24	14	25	23	24	21	22	22	21	22	14	20	20	22	4
19	Excelr8 Motorsport	Ret	28	Ret	22	Ret	23	28	27	23	Ret	Ret	22	25	Ret	DNS	26	Ret	19	28	28	26	22	25	23	22	Ret	20	Ret	22	Ret	4
20	RoKit Racing with Motorbase	20	26	20	Ret	19	Ret	24	Ret	24	24	28	20	22	25	19	22	20	18	26	27	Ret	Ret	26	25							0
Pos.	Team	BHI			DON			THR			CRO			OUL			SNE			THR			KNO			SIL			BHGP			Pts

=== Independent Drivers' Championship ===
Pos.	Driver	BHI			DON			THR			CRO			OUL			SNE			THR			KNO			SIL			BHGP			Pts
1	Rory Butcher	10	8	1	11	5	4	5	7	2	18	14	7	4	7	5	11	12	1	7	14	DNS	1	3	14	15	Ret	16	4	9	2	401
2	Josh Cook	1	7	4	24	8	3	11	10	1	9	8	2	17	10	6	20	15	2	4	1	6	13	9	2	4	5	NC	Ret	13	5	399
3	Tom Chilton	3	9	2	8	4	12	18	25	13	3	9	1	12	Ret	12	Ret	17	12	22	12	22	7	5	7	9	20	5	3	5	Ret	329
4	Jake Hill	2	4	Ret	Ret	9	6	10	12	18	12	Ret	DNS	13	12	14	10	10	Ret	16	15	12	10	10	1	16	16	11	Ret	19	12	276
5	Adam Morgan	5	3	11	Ret	12	8	17	13	Ret	16	11	9	Ret	19	10	Ret	18	Ret	3	2	4	9	7	3	8	Ret	Ret	19	26	9	266
6	Sam Tordoff	Ret	19	16	13	14	15	2	6	Ret	23	15	13	5	5	3	3	5	6	1	10	11										256
7	Chris Smiley	Ret	20	7	7	Ret	11	14	15	11	2	27	24	16	Ret	Ret	14	8	3	10	21	17	6	11	4	3	6	Ret	Ret	24	Ret	247
8	Ollie Jackson	Ret	18	Ret	Ret	11	16	16	Ret	16	Ret	20	11	10	13	13	8	4	7	15	18	15	Ret	18	15	18	14	19	10	6	8	241
9	Aiden Moffat	4	17	9	14	NC	14	20	17	10	13	10	18	18	14	9	17	19	21	18	24	21	11	13	9	19	NC	2	13	12	14	241
10	Stephen Jelley	7	6	3	17	Ret	20	13	18	12	14	12	28	11	6	1	25	Ret	16	19	16	23	Ret	Ret	17	Ret	Ret	23	7	10	11	220
11	Bobby Thompson	6	13	15	18	Ret	Ret	30	22	20	Ret	23	14	19	21	Ret	13	13	Ret	14	22	19	18	21	20	Ret	13	10	21	16	15	154
12	Jack Goff	11	16	12	15	NC	Ret	21	19	DNS	17	16	Ret	14	Ret	DNS	18	DNS	10	24	19	18	19	Ret	26	17	21	1	9	Ret	DNS	143
13	Matt Simpson	18	NC	21	Ret	Ret	Ret	15	21	19	NC	17	25	23	20	Ret	9	9	13	21	17	16	14	12	Ret	13	10	Ret	Ret	27	Ret	136
14	Daniel Rowbottom	23	Ret	23	19	21	17	19	24	Ret	20	21	17	21	15	16	15	Ret	Ret	20	20	14	17	23	18	26	17	Ret	18	15	Ret	122
15	Carl Boardley	NC	25	Ret	20	15	Ret	29	23	Ret	19	22	15	20	17	15	21	Ret	Ret	30	Ret	Ret	16	20	19	23	Ret	Ret	17	14	19	95
16	Rob Smith	Ret	24	17	16	18	19	25	20	23	22	24	22	24	Ret	DNS	26	Ret	19	25	23	24	21	22	23	22	22	14	20	20	22	81
17	Mike Bushell																						Ret	Ret	Ret	7	9	17	6	18	16	63
18	Mark Blundell	14	27	19	23	Ret	22	27	Ret	Ret	21	26	19	Ret	23	18	23	21	Ret	27	26	27	20	24	21	Ret	18	13	22	Ret	20	63
19	Michael Crees	12	23	18	21	16	Ret	26	26	22	Ret	25	27	26	24	22	27	22	Ret	23	25	25	Ret	27	24	Ret	19	9	24	23	Ret	57
20	Michael Caine																									20	12	18	12	8	17	50
21	Sam Osborne	24	28	Ret	22	Ret	23	28	27	21	Ret	Ret	21	25	Ret	21	24	24	14	28	28	26	22	25	22	21	Ret	20	Ret	22	Ret	37
22	Nicolas Hamilton	20	26	20	Ret	19	Ret	24	Ret	24	24	28	20	22	25	19	22	20	18	26	27	Ret	Ret	26	25							37
Pos.	Driver	BHI			DON			THR			CRO			OUL			SNE			THR			KNO			SIL			BHGP			Pts

=== Independent Teams' Championship ===
Pos.	Team	BHI			DON			THR			CRO			OUL			SNE			THR			KNO			SIL			BHGP			Pts
1	Cobra Sport AmD AutoAid/RCIB Insurance	10	8	1	10	5	4	2	6	2	18	14	7	4	5	3	3	5	1	1	10	11	1	3	14	7	9	16	4	9	2	487
2	BTC Racing	1	7	4	7	8	3	11	10	1	2	8	2	16	10	6	14	8	2	4	1	6	6	9	2	3	5	NC	Ret	13	5	458
3	Team Shredded Wheat Racing with Gallagher	3	9	2	8	4	12	16	25	13	3	9	1	10	13	12	8	4	7	15	12	15	7	5	7	9	14	5	3	5	8	431
4	TradePriceCars.com	2	4	19	23	4	6	10	12	18	12	26	19	13	12	14	10	10	Ret	16	15	12	10	10	1	16	16	11	22	18	12	328
5	Mac Tools with Ciceley Motorsport	5	3	11	Ret	12	8	17	13	Ret	13	16	9	Ret	19	10	Ret	18	Ret	3	2	4	9	7	3	8	Ret	Ret	19	26	9	287
6	Laser Tools Racing	4	17	9	14	NC	14	20	17	10	13	10	18	18	14	9	17	19	21	18	24	21	11	13	9	19	NC	2	13	12	14	282
7	Team Parker Racing	7	6	3	17	Ret	20	13	18	12	14	12	28	11	6	1	25	Ret	16	19	16	23	Ret	Ret	17	Ret	Ret	23	7	10	11	249
8	RCIB Insurance with Fox Transport	11	16	12	15	15	Ret	21	19	Ret	17	16	15	14	17	15	18	Ret	10	24	19	18	16	20	19	17	21	1	9	14	19	243
9	GKR Scaffolding with Autobrite Direct	6	13	15	18	16	Ret	26	22	20	Ret	23	14	19	21	22	13	13	Ret	14	22	19	18	21	20	Ret	13	9	21	16	15	206
10	Excelr8 Motorsport	24	24	17	16	18	19	25	20	21	22	24	21	24	Ret	21	24	24	14	25	23	24	21	22	22	21	22	14	20	20	22	175
11	Cataclean Racing with Ciceley Motorsport	23	Ret	23	19	21	17	19	24	Ret	20	21	17	21	15	16	15	Ret	Ret	20	20	14	17	23	18	26	17	Ret	18	15	Ret	172
12	Simpson Racing	18	NC	21	Ret	Ret	Ret	15	21	19	NC	17	25	23	20	Ret	9	9	13	21	17	16	14	12	Ret	13	10	Ret	Ret	27	Ret	171
13	RoKit Racing with Motorbase	20	26	20	Ret	19	Ret	24	Ret	24	24	28	20	22	25	19	22	20	18	26	27	Ret	Ret	26	25							98
14	Motorbase Performance																									20	12	18	12	8	17	63
Pos.	Driver	BHI			DON			THR			CRO			OUL			SNE			THR			KNO			SIL			BHGP			Pts

=== Jack Sears Trophy ===
Pos.	Driver	BHI			DON			THR			CRO			OUL			SNE			THR			KNO			SIL			BHGP			Pts
1	Rory Butcher	10	8	1	11	5	4	5	7	2	18	14	7	4	7	5	11	12	1	7	14	DNS	1	3	14	15	Ret	16	4	9	2	517
2	Tom Oliphant	22	15	6	3	17	13	23	14	7	5	18	23	6	4	2	16	11	Ret	5	4	7	15	14	13	5	7	4	16	Ret	10	481
3	Bobby Thompson	6	13	15	18	Ret	Ret	30	22	20	Ret	23	14	19	21	Ret	13	13	Ret	14	22	19	18	21	20	Ret	13	10	21	16	15	328
4	Daniel Rowbottom	23	Ret	23	19	21	17	19	24	Ret	20	21	17	21	15	16	15	Ret	Ret	20	20	14	17	23	18	26	17	Ret	18	15	Ret	303
5	Rob Smith	Ret	24	17	16	18	19	25	20	23	22	24	22	24	Ret	DNS	26	Ret	19	25	23	24	21	22	23	22	22	14	20	20	22	278
6	Carl Boardley	NC	25	Ret	20	15	Ret	29	23	Ret	19	22	15	20	17	15	21	Ret	Ret	30	Ret	Ret	16	20	19	23	Ret	Ret	17	14	19	248
7	Michael Crees	12	23	18	21	16	Ret	26	26	22	Ret	25	27	26	24	22	27	22	Ret	23	25	25	Ret	27	24	Ret	19	9	24	23	Ret	235
8	Mark Blundell	14	27	19	23	Ret	22	27	Ret	Ret	21	26	19	Ret	23	18	23	21	Ret	27	26	27	20	24	21	Ret	18	13	22	Ret	20	226
9	Sam Osborne	24	28	Ret	22	Ret	23	28	27	21	Ret	Ret	21	25	Ret	21	24	24	14	28	28	26	22	25	22	21	Ret	20	Ret	22	Ret	201
10	Nicolas Hamilton	20	26	20	Ret	19	Ret	24	Ret	24	24	28	20	22	25	19	22	20	18	26	27	Ret	Ret	26	25							183
11	Michael Caine																									20	12	18	12	8	17	91
Pos.	Driver	BHI			DON			THR			CRO			OUL			SNE			THR			KNO			SIL			BHGP			Pts
