= Rob Smith (racing driver) =

British racing driver (born 1992)

- Nationality: (United Kingdom) British
- Born: 21 May 1992 (age 34) Telford, Shropshire

British Touring Car Championship career
- Debut season: 2019
- Current team: Excelr8 Motorsport
- Car number: 37
- Starts: 29
- Wins: 0
- Poles: 0
- Fastest laps: 0
- Best finish: 31st in 2019

Previous series
- 2013-2018 2012-2014: Mini Challenge UK; Renault UK Clio Cup

Rob Smith (born 21 May 1992) is a British racing driver currently competing in the British Touring Car Championship. He debuted in 2019 after spending the previous season in the Mini Challenge UK.

== Racing record ==
=== Complete British Touring Car Championship results ===
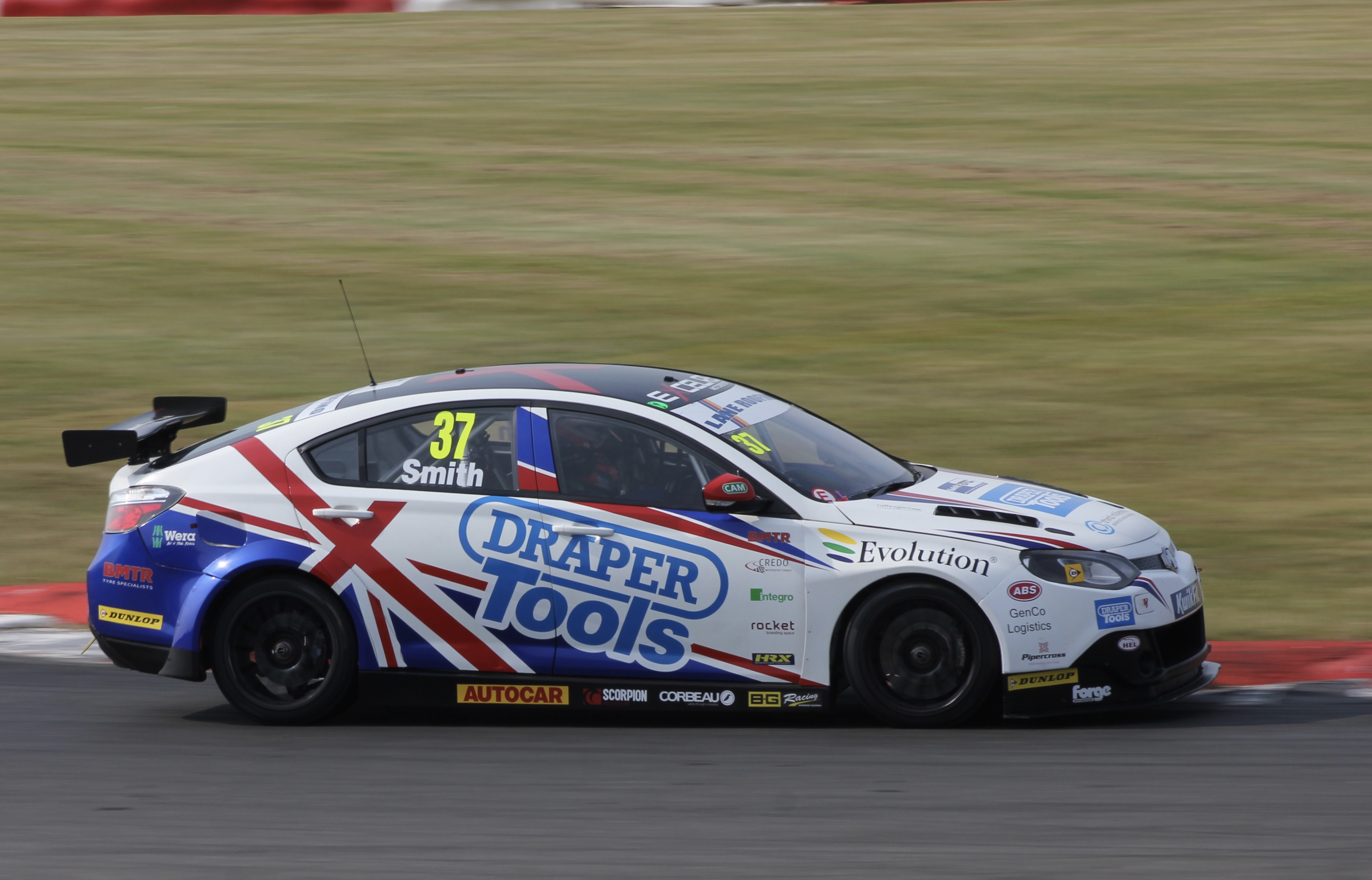
Smith driving the Excelr8 Motorsport MG6 at Snetterton during the 2019 British Touring Car Championship season.

(key) Races in bold indicate pole position (1 point awarded – 2002–2003 all races, 2004–present just in first race) Races in italics indicate fastest lap (1 point awarded all races) * signifies that driver lead race for at least one lap (1 point awarded – 2002 just in feature races, 2003–present all races)

Year	Team	Car	1	2	3	4	5	6	7	8	9	10	11	12	13	14	15	16	17	18	19	20	21	22	23	24	25	26	27	28	29	30	DC	Pts
2019	Excelr8 Motorsport	MG 6 GT	BRH; 1 Ret	BRH; 2; 24	BRH; 3; 17	DON; 1; 16	DON; 2; 18	DON; 3; 19	THR; 1; 25	THR; 2; 20	THR; 3; 23	CRO; 1; 22	CRO; 2; 24	CRO; 3; 22	OUL; 1; 24	OUL; 2 Ret	OUL; 3 DNS	SNE; 1; 26	SNE; 2 Ret	SNE; 3; 19	THR; 1; 25	THR; 2; 23	THR; 3; 24	KNO; 1; 21	KNO; 2; 22	KNO; 3; 23	SIL; 1; 22	SIL; 2; 22	SIL; 3; 14	BRH; 1; 20	BRH; 2; 20	BRH; 3; 22	31st	2
